= 2025–26 EuroLeague Women regular season =

EuroLeague Women regular season
- Season: 2025–26
- Dates: 8 October 2025 – 4 February 2026
- Games played: 84
- Teams: 16 (from 9 countries)

The 2025–26 EuroLeague Women regular season was played between the 8 October 2025 to 4 February 2026.

== Format ==
- Regular season (First round)

After the qualifiers, 16 teams will be split into 4 groups of four, where the top three from each group advances to the second round. The fourth place teams drop down to the EuroCup Women knockout stage. The advancing teams' records from the first round are carried over into the next round.

- Regular season (Second round)

The 12 remaining teams form 2 groups of six and will play the teams they have not played in the first round. In both groups, the top 2 will play the Semi-Final play-ins while 3rd and 4th play the Quarter-Final play-ins. The teams who finish fifth and sixth are eliminated.

== Draw ==
External videos
- Draw

The seeding was announced on 16 July 2025. The draw took place at 10:00 CET in Munich, Germany on 23 July 2025. Only a maximum of one club from the same country can be in the same regular season group. The seeding is based on the club rankings.

Key to colours
Teams advancing to the Second round
Teams advancing to the Quarterfinal play-ins
Teams advancing to the Semifinal play-ins

Pot 1
Team	Rank	Points
(Turkish Basketball Federation) Fenerbahçe Opet	1	336
(Czech Basketball Federation) ZVVZ USK Praha	2	268
(Turkish Basketball Federation) ÇIMSA CBK Mersin	3	260
(Italian Basketball Federation) Beretta Famila Schio	4	170

Pot 2
Team	Rank	Points
(Spanish Basketball Federation) Valencia Basket	6	124
(Spanish Basketball Federation) Spar Girona	13	68
(French Federation of Basketball) Basket Landes	14	67
(Hungarian Basketball Federation) Sopron Basket	15	64

Pot 3
Team	Rank	Points
(Hellenic Basketball Federation) Olympiacos SFP	29	30
(Polish Basketball Federation) VBW Gdynia	35	28
(French Federation of Basketball) Flammes Carolo Basket	49	18
(Spanish Basketball Federation) Casademont Zaragoza (Note: Team not known at the time of the draw. Was the Play Off 1 Winner in qualification.)	8	95

Pot 4
Team	Rank	Points
(Italian Basketball Federation) Umana Reyer Venezia (Note: Team not known at the time of the draw. Was the Play Off 2 Winner in qualification.)	12	72
(Turkish Basketball Federation) Galatasaray Çağdaş Faktoring (Note: Team not known at the time of the draw. Was the Play Off 3 Winner in qualification.)	15	64
(Hungarian Basketball Federation) DVTK HUN-Therm (Note: Team not known at the time of the draw. Was the Play Off 4 Winner in qualification.)	11	74
(French Federation of Basketball) Tango Bourges Basket (Note: Team not known at the time of the draw. Was the Play Off 5 Winner in qualification.)	8	95

== First round ==
=== Group A ===
Pos	Team	Pld	W	L	PF	PA	PD	Pts	Qualification	GIR	TAN	PRA	ARK
1	(Spanish Basketball Federation) Spar Girona	6	5	1	489	387	+102	11	Second round	—	92–62	83–78	86–53
2	(French Federation of Basketball) Tango Bourges Basket	6	4	2	421	394	+27	10	Second round	69–63	—	57–77	83–62
3	(Czech Basketball Federation) ZVVZ USK Praha	6	3	3	457	411	+46	9	Second round	60–75	43–78	—	102–67
4	(Polish Basketball Federation) VBW Gdynia	6	0	6	355	530	−175	6	EuroCup Women	65–90	57–72	51–97	—

Source: EuroLeague Women
Legend: Blue = home team win; Red = away team win.
Rules for classification: 1) Points; 2) Points difference; 3) Points scored.

8 October 2025
20:00 (CEST)

Boxscore

Spar Girona (Spanish Basketball Federation)	86–53	(Polish Basketball Federation) VBW Gdynia
Scoring by quarter: 21–11, 23–9, 12–20, 30–13
Pts: Coulibaly 22; Rebs: Coulibaly 8 Asts: Holm 7		Pts: Wrzesinski 11; Rebs: Hebard 7 Asts: Wrzesinski 4

Pavelló Fontajau, Girona
Attendance: 2,046
Referees: Sónia Teixeira (POR), James Kerry Dominique (GIB), Emma Perry (IRL)

8 October 2025
20:00 (CEST)

Boxscore

Tango Bourges Basket (French Federation of Basketball)	57–77	(Czech Basketball Federation) ZVVZ USK Praha
Scoring by quarter: 17–18, 13–18, 14–24, 13–17
Pts: Pouye 18; Rebs: Diaby 8 Asts: Diaby 4		Pts: Ayayi 21; Rebs: Ayayi, Čechová 7 Asts: Astier 8

Caisse d'Epargne Loire Centre - le Prado, Bourges
Attendance: 3,100
Referees: Özlem Yalman (TUR), Jelena Tomić (CRO), Oleksandr Dotsenko (LUX)

15 October 2025
19:00 (CEST)

Boxscore

ZVVZ USK Praha (Czech Basketball Federation)	60–75	(Spanish Basketball Federation) Spar Girona
Scoring by quarter: 23–20, 12–26, 14–22, 11–7
Pts: Astier 17; Rebs: Hof 7 Asts: Astier 6		Pts: Holm 15; Rebs: Amihere 8 Asts: Jocytė 6

Královka Arena, Prague
Attendance: 829
Referees: Ivana Ivanović (SRB), Armin Mutapčić (GER), Aleksandar Radonjić (AUT)

15 October 2025
18:00 (CEST)

Boxscore

VBW Gdynia (Polish Basketball Federation)	57–72	(French Federation of Basketball) Tango Bourges Basket
Scoring by quarter: 12–16, 20–19, 9–20, 16–17
Pts: Hebard 20; Rebs: Hebard 8 Asts: Wrzesinski 10		Pts: Pouye; Rebs: Naigre 8 Asts: Pouye 5

Polsat Plus Arena, Gdynia
Attendance: 300
Referees: Nikola Bejat (NOR), Sara Månsson (SWE), Amalia Marchiș (ROU)

22 October 2025
18:00 (CEST)

Boxscore

VBW Gdynia (Polish Basketball Federation)	51–97	(Czech Basketball Federation) ZVVZ USK Praha
Scoring by quarter: 10–24, 20–23, 10–29, 11–21
Pts: Banaszak 19; Rebs: Banaszak, Hebard 4 Asts: Wrzesinski 8		Pts: Ayayi, Hof 18; Rebs: Hof 10; Asts: Chen 10

Polsat Plus Arena, Gdynia
Attendance: 300
Referees: Özlem Yalman (TUR), Alessandro Perciavalle (ITA), Nace Mohorič (SLO)

22 October 2025
19:00 (CEST)

Boxscore

Spar Girona (Spanish Basketball Federation)	92–62	(French Federation of Basketball) Tango Bourges Basket
Scoring by quarter: 24–16, 30–15, 24–11, 14–20
Pts: Coulibaly 26; Rebs: Coulibaly 6 Asts: Holm, Quevedo 5		Pts: Naigre 14; Rebs: Naigre 4 Asts: Fora 4

Pavelló Fontajau, Girona
Attendance: 2,385
Referees: Sónia Teixeira (POR), Tom de Lange (BEL), Iain Macdonald (GBR)

29 October 2025
18:00 (CET)

Boxscore

VBW Gdynia (Polish Basketball Federation)	65–90	(Spanish Basketball Federation) Spar Girona
Scoring by quarter: 20–17, 21–17, 10–32, 14–24
Pts: Jones 14; Rebs: Jones 7 Asts: Wrzesinski 7		Pts: Coulibaly, Jocytė 18; Rebs: Coulibaly 9 Asts: Jocytė 7

Polsat Plus Arena, Gdynia
Attendance: 200
Referees: Viola Györgyi (NOR), Denys Povorozniuk (UKR), Blažo Begenisić (SWE)

29 October 2025
19:00 (CET)

Boxscore

ZVVZ USK Praha (Czech Basketball Federation)	43–78	(French Federation of Basketball) Tango Bourges Basket
Scoring by quarter: 9–17, 11–28, 9–15, 14–18
Pts: Carleton 8 Rebs: Hof, Salaün 7 Asts: three players 2		Pts: Pouye 18; Rebs: Guapo 9 Asts: Duchet 7

Královka Arena, Prague
Attendance: 854
Referees: Yasmina Alcaraz (ESP), Maria Ignatiou (CYP), Sara Månsson (SWE)

4 November 2025
20:00 (CET)

Boxscore

Tango Bourges Basket (French Federation of Basketball)	83–62	(Polish Basketball Federation) VBW Gdynia
Scoring by quarter: 15–13, 27–14, 27–21, 14–14
Pts: Duchet 18; Rebs: Djaldi-Tabdi 12; Asts: Foppossi, Fora 6		Pts: Jones 15; Rebs: Banaszak 5 Asts: Banaszak 5

Caisse d'Epargne Loire Centre - le Prado, Bourges
Attendance: 2,500
Referees: Veronika Obertová (SVK), Özlem Yalman (TUR), Martin Van Hoye (BEL)

5 November 2025
19:30 (CET)

Boxscore

Spar Girona (Spanish Basketball Federation)	83–78	(Czech Basketball Federation) ZVVZ USK Praha
Scoring by quarter: 22–22, 21–22, 17–17, 23–17
Pts: Jocytė 23; Rebs: Amihere 10; Asts: Holm 6		Pts: Ayayi 16; Rebs: Hof 12; Asts: Astier 6

Pavelló Fontajau, Girona
Attendance: 1,968
Referees: Ivana Ivanović (SRB), Nikola Perlić (CRO), Svetlana Stoyanova (BUL)

26 November 2025
20:00 (CET)

Boxscore

Tango Bourges Basket (French Federation of Basketball)	69–63	(Spanish Basketball Federation) Spar Girona
Scoring by quarter: 16–25, 21–15, 19–15, 13–8
Pts: Duchet 19; Rebs: Diaby 12; Asts: Duchet 5		Pts: Coulibaly 12; Rebs: Coulibaly 10; Asts: Jocytė 4

Caisse d'Epargne Loire Centre - le Prado, Bourges
Attendance: 2,928
Referees: Emmouil Tsolakos (GRE), Aurimas Borušas (LTU), Tom Dehondt (BEL)

26 November 2025
19:00 (CET)

Boxscore

ZVVZ USK Praha (Czech Basketball Federation)	102–67	(Polish Basketball Federation) VBW Gdynia
Scoring by quarter: 34–17, 26–20, 26–18, 16–12
Pts: Salaün 19; Rebs: Ayayi 7 Asts: Cazorla, Astier 7		Pts: Wrzesinski 14; Rebs: Jones 7 Asts: Banaszak, Wrzesinski 5

Královka Arena, Prague
Attendance: 677
Referees: Nataša Dragojević (MNE), Roko Hordov (CRO), Amalia Marchiş (ROU)

=== Group B ===
Pos	Team	Pld	W	L	PF	PA	PD	Pts	Qualification	GAL	SCH	FLA	SOP
1	(Turkish Basketball Federation) Galatasaray Cagdas Faktoring	6	6	0	471	378	+93	12	Second round	—	73–70	77–73	104–54
2	(Italian Basketball Federation) Beretta Famila Schio	6	4	2	452	415	+37	10	Second round	61–72	—	74–57	82–65
3	(French Federation of Basketball) Flammes Carolo Basket	6	2	4	419	410	+9	8	Second round	56–62	79–81	—	72–62
4	(Hungarian Basketball Federation) Sopron Basket	6	0	6	368	507	−139	6	EuroCup Women	64–83	69–84	54–82	—

Source: EuroLeague Women
Legend: Blue = home team win; Red = away team win.
Rules for classification: 1) Points; 2) Points difference; 3) Points scored.

8 October 2025
18:00 (CEST)

Boxscore

Sopron Basket (Hungarian Basketball Federation)	54–82	(French Federation of Basketball) Flammes Carolo Basket
Scoring by quarter: 16–19, 11–23, 12–19, 15–21
Pts: Brooks 14; Rebs: Friškovec 5 Asts: Mühl 7		Pts: Dixon 15; Rebs: Dixon, Hirsch 6 Asts: Franchelin 7

Arena Sopron, Sopron
Attendance: 900
Referees: Paulina Karolina Gajdosz (POL), Yasmina Alcaraz (ESP), Suzana Vujičić (MNE)

8 October 2025
20:00 (TRT)

Boxscore

Galatasaray Cagdas Faktoring (Turkish Basketball Federation)	73–70	(Italian Basketball Federation) Beretta Famila Schio
Scoring by quarter: 17–20, 15–19, 21–16, 20–15
Pts: Smalls 14; Rebs: Juhász 8 Asts: Oblak 5		Pts: Conde 17; Rebs: Shepard 7 Asts: Conde 4

Sinan Erdem Dome, Istanbul
Attendance: 1,500
Referees: Esperanza Mendoza (ESP), Nataša Dragojević (MNE), Tomasz Wit Langowski (POL)

15 October 2025
19:00 (CEST)

Boxscore

Flammes Carolo Basket (French Federation of Basketball)	56–62	(Turkish Basketball Federation) Galatasaray Cagdas Faktoring
Scoring by quarter: 18–21, 13–8, 13–15, 12–18
Pts: Franchelin 12; Rebs: Brochant, Dixon 7 Asts: Franchelin 5		Pts: Oblak 12; Rebs: Williams 8 Asts: Oblak 4

Caisse d' Epargne Arena, Charleville-Mézières
Attendance: 2,800
Referees: Veronika Obertová (SVK), Iain Macdonald (GBR), Ewa Matuszewska (POL)

16 October 2025
20:00 (CEST)

Boxscore

Beretta Famila Schio (Italian Basketball Federation)	82–65	(Hungarian Basketball Federation) Sopron Basket
Scoring by quarter: 28–19, 13–11, 22–19, 19–16
Pts: Badiane 16; Rebs: three players 5 Asts: Shepard 5		Pts: Friškovec 23; Rebs: Friškovec 10; Asts: Mühl 4

Palazzetto Livio Romare, Schio
Attendance: 1,780
Referees: Branimir Galić (CRO), Maria Ignatiou (CYP), Goran Grbić (SLO)

22 October 2025
18:00 (CEST)

Boxscore

Sopron Basket (Hungarian Basketball Federation)	64–83	(Turkish Basketball Federation) Galatasaray Cagdas Faktoring
Scoring by quarter: 13–18, 18–17, 18–30, 15–18
Pts: Brooks, Papp 12; Rebs: Papp 6 Asts: Papp 5		Pts: Juhász 21; Rebs: Juhasz 10; Asts: Smalls 10

Arena Sopron, Sopron
Attendance: 900
Referees: Nataša Dragojević (MNE), Nermin Hodžić (GER), Esperanza Mendoza (ESP)

22 October 2025
19:00 (CEST)

Boxscore

Flammes Carolo Basket (French Federation of Basketball)	79–81	(Italian Basketball Federation) Beretta Famila Schio
Scoring by quarter: 26–31, 21–15, 21–19, 11–16
Pts: Franchelin 14; Rebs: Dixon 7 Asts: Franchelin 9		Pts: Zandalasini 15; Rebs: Shepard 10; Asts: Conde 7

Caisse d' Epargne Arena, Charleville-Mézières
Attendance: 2,160
Referees: José Pedroso (POR), Yasmina Alcaraz (ESP), Tiago Roxo Perdigão (POR)

29 October 2025
19:00 (CET)

Boxscore

Flammes Carolo Basket (French Federation of Basketball)	72–62	(Hungarian Basketball Federation) Sopron Basket
Scoring by quarter: 22–16, 20–13, 20–16, 10–17
Pts: Joens 15; Rebs: Dixon 8 Asts: Jerome 6		Pts: Brooks 20; Rebs: Friškovec, Mühl 8 Asts: Mühl 6

Caisse d' Epargne Arena, Charleville-Mézières
Attendance: 2, 200
Referees: Özlem Yalman (TUR), Sandra Sánchez (ESP), Amalia Marchiş (ROU)

29 October 2025
20:00 (CET)

Boxscore

Beretta Famila Schio (Italian Basketball Federation)	61–72	(Turkish Basketball Federation) Galatasaray Cagdas Faktoring
Scoring by quarter: 13–17, 11–13, 17–15, 20–27
Pts: Conde 12; Rebs: Shepard 8 Asts: Conde 6		Pts: Kuier, Smalls 17; Rebs: Juhász 7 Asts: Oblak 7

Palazzetto Livio Romare, Schio
Attendance: 1,900
Referees: Jelena Tomić (CRO), Ivana Ivanović (SRB), Diana Lapanović (SLO)

4 November 2025
18:00 (CET)

Boxscore

Sopron Basket (Hungarian Basketball Federation)	69–84	(Italian Basketball Federation) Beretta Famila Schio
Scoring by quarter: 18–22, 20–15, 23–22, 8–25
Pts: Brooks 20; Rebs: Brooks 7 Asts: Mühl 4		Pts: Shepard 22; Rebs: Shepard 10; Asts: Conde, Verona 6

Arena Sopron, Sopron
Attendance: 850
Referees: Dariusz Zapolski (POL), Łukasz Jankowski (POL), Roko Hordov (CRO)

4 November 2025
20:00 (TRT)

Boxscore

Galatasaray Cagdas Faktoring (Turkish Basketball Federation)	77–73	(French Federation of Basketball) Flammes Carolo Basket
Scoring by quarter: 21–15, 12–24, 22–16, 22–18
Pts: Smalls 15; Rebs: Juhász, Kuier 8 Asts: Erdoğan 4		Pts: Brochant 16; Rebs: Dixon 7 Asts: Brochant, Franchelin 6

Sinan Erdem Dome, Istanbul
Attendance: 1,000
Referees: Sónia Teixeira (POR), Gilbert Hoxha (ALB), Veronika Vávrová (CZE)

26 November 2025
20:00 (TRT)

Boxscore

Galatasaray Cagdas Faktoring (Turkish Basketball Federation)	104–54	(Hungarian Basketball Federation) Sopron Basket
Scoring by quarter: 31–15, 27–13, 24–11, 22–15
Pts: Juhász 22; Rebs: Kuier 10; Asts: Smalls, Johannès 7		Pts: Sitku 15; Rebs: Jevtovic 6 Asts: Papp 6

Sinan Erdem Dome, Istanbul
Attendance: 627
Referees: Esperanza Mendoza (ESP), Igor Esteve Malmierca (AND), Megaklis-Konstantinos Marinakis (GRE)

26 November 2025
20:00 (CET)

Boxscore

Beretta Famila Schio (Italian Basketball Federation)	74–57	(French Federation of Basketball) Flammes Carolo Basket
Scoring by quarter: 22–5, 18–16, 16–14, 18–22
Pts: Shepard 22; Rebs: Shepard 15; Asts: Conde 8		Pts: Brochant 13; Rebs: Dixon 8 Asts: Franchelin 6

Palazzetto Livio Romare, Schio
Attendance: 1,500
Referees: Yasmina Alcaraz (ESP), Maria Ignatiou (CYP), Sandra Sánchez (ESP)

=== Group C ===
Pos	Team	Pld	W	L	PF	PA	PD	Pts	Qualification	FEN	VAL	DVTK	OLY
1	(Turkish Basketball Federation) Fenerbahçe Opet	6	6	0	541	364	+177	12	Second round	—	71–49	113–65	94–73
2	(Spanish Basketball Federation) Valencia Basket	6	4	2	497	399	+98	10	Second round	72–75	—	81–58	99–57
3	(Hungarian Basketball Federation) DVTK HUN-Therm	6	1	5	389	514	−125	7 (Note: DVTK HUN-Therm 144–132 Olympiacos SFP)	Second round	58–89	64–99	—	87–63
4	(Hellenic Basketball Federation) Olympiacos SFP	6	1	5	383	533	−150	7	EuroCup Women	47–99	74–97	69–57	—

Source: EuroLeague Women
Legend: Blue = home team win; Red = away team win.
Rules for classification: 1) Points; 2) Points difference; 3) Points scored.
Notes:

8 October 2025
18:30 (EEST)

Boxscore

Olympiacos SFP (Hellenic Basketball Federation)	74–97	(Spanish Basketball Federation) Valencia Basket
Scoring by quarter: 19–28, 24–21, 15–23, 16–25
Pts: Christinaki 26; Rebs: Johnson 10; Asts: Woolfolk 7		Pts: Alexander 23; Rebs: Alexander 10; Asts: Romero 9

Peace and Friendship Stadium, Piraeus
Attendance: 200
Referees: Veronika Obertová (SVK), Ivana Ivanović (SRB), Amalia Marchiş (ROU)

8 October 2025
18:00 (TRT)

Boxscore

DVTK HUN-Therm (Hungarian Basketball Federation)	58–89	(Turkish Basketball Federation) Fenerbahçe Opet
Scoring by quarter: 19–22, 7–17, 19–23, 13–27
Pts: Ginzo 13; Rebs: Kanyasi 6 Asts: Aho 7		Pts: Rupert 16; Rebs: Allemand, Billings 6 Asts: Allemand 8

DVTK Arena, Miskolc
Attendance: 2,500
Referees: Silvia Marziali (ITA), Jan Baloun (CZE), Aurimas Borušas (LTU)

15 October 2025
18:30 (EEST)

Boxscore

Olympiacos SFP (Hellenic Basketball Federation)	69–57	(Hungarian Basketball Federation) DVTK HUN-Therm
Scoring by quarter: 15–14, 16–18, 26–14, 12–11
Pts: Christinaki 22; Rebs: Johnson, Raber 6 Asts: Woolfolk 8		Pts: Ginzo 16; Rebs: four players 5 Asts: Lelik 8

Peace and Friendship Stadium, Piraeus
Attendance: 200
Referees: Jelena Tomić (CRO), Nataša Dragojević (MNE), Gilbert Hoxha (ALB)

15 October 2025
19:15 (CEST)

Boxscore

Valencia Basket (Spanish Basketball Federation)	72–75 (OT)	(Turkish Basketball Federation) Fenerbahçe Opet
Scoring by quarter: 24–13, 7–15, 17–25, 17–12, Overtime: 7–10
Pts: Carrera, Fam 17; Rebs: Fam 7 Asts: Romero 12		Pts: Billings 20; Rebs: Rupert 12; Asts: Allemand 8

Roig Arena, Valencia
Attendance: 4,048
Referees: Paulina Karolina Gajdosz (POL), Sónia Teixeira (POR), Domen Krajnc (SLO)

22 October 2025
20:00 (TRT)

Boxscore

Fenerbahçe Opet (Turkish Basketball Federation)	94–73	(Hellenic Basketball Federation) Olympiacos SFP
Scoring by quarter: 19–23, 26–19, 24–15, 25–16
Pts: Meesseman 17; Rebs: Rupert 7 Asts: Allemand 12		Pts: Johnson 17; Rebs: Woolfolk, Johnson 5 Asts: Kollatou, Woolfolk 6

Ülker Sports and Event Hall, Istanbul
Attendance: 4,000
Referees: Mikheil Vartanov (GEO), Svetlana Stoyanova (BUL), Amalia Marchiș (ROU)

23 October 2025
18:00 (CEST)

Boxscore

DVTK HUN-Therm (Hungarian Basketball Federation)	64–99	(Spanish Basketball Federation) Valencia Basket
Scoring by quarter: 5–21, 19–26, 21–29, 19–23
Pts: Lelik 14; Rebs: Ginzo 5 Asts: Lelik 7		Pts: Alexander 23; Rebs: Alexander, Araujo 7 Asts: Iagupova 7

DVTK Arena, Miskolc
Attendance: 2,800
Referees: Ivana Ivanović (SRB), Amal Dahra (FRA), Armin Mutapčić (GER)

29 October 2025
20:00 (CET)

Boxscore

Valencia Basket (Spanish Basketball Federation)	99–57	(Hellenic Basketball Federation) Olympiacos SFP
Scoring by quarter: 25–13, 26–19, 23–12, 25–13
Pts: Abdelkader, Alexander 15; Rebs: Araújo 10; Asts: Leković 8		Pts: Woolfolk 17; Rebs: Woolfolk 7 Asts: Kollatou 3

Roig Arena, Valencia
Attendance: 4,307
Referees: Veronika Obertová (SVK), Kristīne Simanoviča (LAT), Laure Coanus (FRA)

29 October 2025
20:00 (TRT)

Boxscore

Fenerbahçe Opet (Turkish Basketball Federation)	113–65	(Hungarian Basketball Federation) DVTK HUN-Therm
Scoring by quarter: 26–13, 27–13, 35–20, 25–19
Pts: McBride 16; Rebs: Rupert, Allemand 6 Asts: Onar 10		Pts: Lelik 14; Rebs: Westbeld 6 Asts: Kanyasi, Lelik 4

Ülker Sports and Event Hall, Istanbul
Attendance: 4,000
Referees: Esperanza Mendoza (ESP), Ewa Matuszewska (POL), Suzana Vujičić (MNE)

4 November 2025
20:00 (TRT)

Boxscore

Fenerbahçe Opet (Turkish Basketball Federation)	71–49	(Spanish Basketball Federation) Valencia Basket
Scoring by quarter: 20–9, 15–15, 20–13, 16–12
Pts: McBride 16; Rebs: Allemand 10; Asts: Allemand 8		Pts: Buenavida, Carrera 8 Rebs: Fiebich, Alexander 5 Asts: Buenavida, Romero 3

Ülker Sports and Event Hall, Istanbul
Attendance: 2,000
Referees: Jelena Tomić (CRO), Nataša Dragojević (MNE), Petr Blahout (CZE)

5 November 2025
19:00 (CET)

Boxscore

DVTK HUN-Therm (Hungarian Basketball Federation)	87–63	(Hellenic Basketball Federation) Olympiacos SFP
Scoring by quarter: 21–19, 23–16, 17–18, 26–10
Pts: Westbeld 26; Rebs: Westbeld 9 Asts: Aho 7		Pts: Jakubcová 17; Rebs: Raber 8 Asts: Raber 4

DVTK Arena, Miskolc
Attendance: 2,000
Referees: Sara Månsson (SWE), Yasmina Alcaraz (ESP), Diana Lapanović (SLO)

26 November 2025
20:00 (CET)

Boxscore

Valencia Basket (Spanish Basketball Federation)	81–58	(Hungarian Basketball Federation) DVTK HUN-Therm
Scoring by quarter: 21–15, 17–18, 21–12, 22–13
Pts: Alexander 26; Rebs: Alexander 11; Asts: Araújo, Romero 4		Pts: Ginzo 12; Rebs: Smuda 9 Asts: Miklos 6

Roig Arena, Valencia
Attendance: 2,991
Referees: Sónia Teixeira (POR), Amal Dahra (FRA), Bogna Podkowinska (POL)

26 November 2025
18:30 (EET)

Boxscore

Olympiacos SFP (Hellenic Basketball Federation)	47–99	(Turkish Basketball Federation) Fenerbahçe Opet
Scoring by quarter: 8–31, 18–18, 13–30, 8–20
Pts: Christinaki 9 Rebs: Karlafti, Christinaki 5 Asts: Kollatou 4		Pts: Meesseman 19; Rebs: Gustafson 9 Asts: Allemand, Meesseman 8

Peace and Friendship Stadium, Piraeus
Attendance: 350
Referees: Armin Mutapčić (GER), Hrvoje Ćavar (BIH), Veronika Vávrová (CZE)

=== Group D ===
Pos	Team	Pld	W	L	PF	PA	PD	Pts	Qualification	LAN	REY	CAS	MER
1	(French Federation of Basketball) Basket Landes	6	4	2	390	374	+16	10	Second round	—	63–57	70–73	66–55
2	(Italian Basketball Federation) Umana Reyer Venezia	6	4	2	407	405	+2	10	Second round	57–56	—	68–61	72–62
3	(Spanish Basketball Federation) Casademont Zaragoza	6	3	3	444	417	+27	9	Second round	63–65	80–84	—	88–58
4	(Turkish Basketball Federation) ÇIMSA CBK Mersin	6	1	5	399	444	−45	7	EuroCup Women	69–70	83–69	72–79	—

Source: EuroLeague Women
Legend: Blue = home team win; Red = away team win.
Rules for classification: 1) Points; 2) Points difference; 3) Points scored.

8 October 2025
19:30 (CEST)

Boxscore

Basket Landes (French Federation of Basketball)	70–73	(Spanish Basketball Federation) Casademont Zaragoza
Scoring by quarter: 12–27, 19–13, 15–14, 24–19
Pts: Wojta 15; Rebs: Bassey, Musa 6 Asts: four players 3		Pts: Pueyo 23; Rebs: Hempe 8 Asts: Ortiz 6

Espace François Mitterrand, Mont-de-Marsan
Attendance: 2,600
Referees: Viola Györgi (NOR), Sara Månsson (SWE), Chess van Looy (BEL)

9 October 2025
19:30 (CEST)

Boxscore

Umana Reyer Venezia (Italian Basketball Federation)	72–62	(Turkish Basketball Federation) ÇIMSA CBK Mersin
Scoring by quarter: 23–21, 15–20, 19–13, 15–8
Pts: Charles 15; Rebs: Charles 11; Asts: Santucci 5		Pts: Burke 19; Rebs: Juškaitė, Ural 8 Asts: Vanloo 6

Palasport Taliercio, Venice
Attendance: 778
Referees: Viktor Nagy (HUN), Ilias Karpanos (GRE), Branimir Galić (CRO)

16 October 2025
20:00 (CEST)

Boxscore

Casademont Zaragoza (Spanish Basketball Federation)	80–84	(Italian Basketball Federation) Umana Reyer Venezia
Scoring by quarter: 19–20, 21–18, 24–26, 16–20
Pts: Fingall 15; Rebs: Ortiz 6 Asts: Ortiz 8		Pts: Holmes 24; Rebs: Holmes 9 Asts: Santucci 7

Pabellón Príncipe Felipe, Zaragoza
Attendance: 5,098
Referees: Marek Kukelčík (SVK), Łukasz Jankowski (POL), Nermin Hodžić (GER)

16 October 2025
19:00 (TRT)

Boxscore

ÇIMSA CBK Mersin (Turkish Basketball Federation)	69–70	(French Federation of Basketball) Basket Landes
Scoring by quarter: 19–18, 15–16, 20–22, 15–14
Pts: Juškaitė 20; Rebs: Burke 9 Asts: six players 2		Pts: Bussiere 12; Rebs: Macquet 10; Asts: Lacan 7

Servet Tazegul Spor Salonu, Mersin
Attendance: 1,000
Referees: Alin Faur (ROU), Mikheil Vartanov (GEO), Mladen Lučić (MNE)

22 October 2025
19:00 (TRT)

Boxscore

ÇIMSA CBK Mersin (Turkish Basketball Federation)	72–79	(Spanish Basketball Federation) Casademont Zaragoza
Scoring by quarter: 20–16, 23–19, 13–17, 16–27
Pts: Burke 22; Rebs: Burke, Hayes 5 Asts: Vanloo 8		Pts: Leite 22; Rebs: Pueyo 8 Asts: three players 4

Servet Tazegul Spor Salonu, Mersin
Attendance: 1,500
Referees: Veronika Obertová (SVK), Jelena Tomić (CRO), Gilbert Hoxha (ALB)

23 October 2025
19:30 (CEST)

Boxscore

Basket Landes (French Federation of Basketball)	63–57	(Italian Basketball Federation) Umana Reyer Venezia
Scoring by quarter: 15–10, 16–15, 12–19, 20–13
Pts: Massey, Musa 13; Rebs: Wojta 7 Asts: Droguet 7		Pts: Holmes, Pasa 12; Rebs: Cubaj 9 Asts: Pasa 4

Espace François Mitterrand, Mont-de-Marsan
Attendance: 2,600
Referees: Ilias Karpanos (GRE), Ewa Matuszewska (POL), Skirmantas Letukas (DEN)

29 October 2025
20:00 (CET)

Boxscore

Casademont Zaragoza (Spanish Basketball Federation)	63–65	(French Federation of Basketball) Basket Landes
Scoring by quarter: 13–25, 17–13, 17–10, 16–17
Pts: Mawuli 17; Rebs: Fingall 6 Asts: Leite, Ortiz 4		Pts: Lacan, Wojta 11; Rebs: Musa 10; Asts: Massey 4

Pabellón Príncipe Felipe, Zaragoza
Attendance: 4,784
Referees: Sónia Teixeira (POR), Milita Stalaučinskaitė (LTU), Veronika Vávrová (CZE)

30 October 2025
19:00 (TRT)

Boxscore

ÇIMSA CBK Mersin (Turkish Basketball Federation)	83–69	(Italian Basketball Federation) Umana Reyer Venezia
Scoring by quarter: 18–15, 16–23, 24–12, 25–19
Pts: Vanloo 23; Rebs: Burke 10; Asts: Vanloo 6		Pts: Mavunga 16; Rebs: Charles, Mavunga 9 Asts: Santucci 6

Servet Tazegul Spor Salonu, Mersin
Attendance: 1,000
Referees: Nataša Dragojević (MNE), Amal Dahra (FRA), Svetlana Stoyanova (BUL)

4 November 2025
19:30 (CET)

Boxscore

Basket Landes (French Federation of Basketball)	66–55	(Turkish Basketball Federation) ÇIMSA CBK Mersin
Scoring by quarter: 10–8, 13–19, 25–11, 18–17
Pts: Wojta 12; Rebs: Musa 9 Asts: Droguet 7		Pts: Vanloo 21; Rebs: Juškaitė 10; Asts: Ataş, Vanloo 2

Espace François Mitterrand, Mont-de-Marsan
Attendance: 2,600
Referees: Esperanza Mendoza (ESP), Balázs Mészáros (HUN), Amalia Marchiş (ROU)

4 November 2025
19:30 (CET)

Boxscore

Umana Reyer Venezia (Italian Basketball Federation)	68–61	(Spanish Basketball Federation) Casademont Zaragoza
Scoring by quarter: 22–19, 19–16, 14–15, 13–11
Pts: Holmes 20; Rebs: Mavunga 7 Asts: Cubaj 5		Pts: Fingall 16; Rebs: Fingall 9 Asts: three players 3

Palasport Taliercio, Venice
Attendance: 833
Referees: Domen Krajnc (SLO), Goran Grbić (SLO), Martin Kučírek (CZE)

26 November 2025
19:30 (CET)

Boxscore

Umana Reyer Venezia (Italian Basketball Federation)	57–56	(French Federation of Basketball) Basket Landes
Scoring by quarter: 22–17, 7–12, 19–13, 9–14
Pts: Charles 16; Rebs: Charles 8 Asts: Santucci 5		Pts: Wojta 14; Rebs: Lacan 8 Asts: Pardon, Droguet 4

Palasport Taliercio, Venice
Attendance: 1,047
Referees: Veronika Obertová (SVK), Nace Mohorič (SLO), Ewa Matuszewska (POL)

26 November 2025
20:00 (CET)

Boxscore

Casademont Zaragoza (Spanish Basketball Federation)	88–58	(Turkish Basketball Federation) ÇIMSA CBK Mersin
Scoring by quarter: 25–19, 15–15, 26–10, 22–14
Pts: Hempe 19; Rebs: Fingall 7 Asts: Ortiz 9		Pts: Vanloo 18; Rebs: Juškaitė 6 Asts: Vanloo 5

Pabellón Príncipe Felipe, Zaragoza
Attendance: 9,106
Referees: Viola Györgyi (NOR), Jan Baloun (CZE), Gavin Williams (GBR)

== Second round ==
=== Group E ===
Pos	Team	Pld	W	L	PF	PA	PD	Pts	Qualification	GAL	GIR	PRA	SCH	TAN	FLA
1	(Turkish Basketball Federation) Galatasaray Cagdas Faktoring	12	10	2	901	772	+129	22	Semifinal play-in	—	67–57	64–71	73–70	80–62	77–73
2	(Spanish Basketball Federation) Spar Girona	12	8	4	941	819	+122	20 (Note: Spar Girona 158–138 ZVVZ USK Praha)	Semifinal play-in	68–82	—	83–78	81–72	92–62	89–58
3	(Czech Basketball Federation) ZVVZ USK Praha	12	8	4	934	820	+114	20	Quarterfinal play-in	64–55	60–75	—	78–66	43–78	98–55
4	(Italian Basketball Federation) Beretta Famila Schio	12	7	5	932	887	+45	19	Quarterfinal play-in	61–72	85–74	99–78	—	77–69	74–57
5	(French Federation of Basketball) Tango Bourges Basket	12	6	6	860	836	+24	18		72–82	69–63	57–77	92–81	—	85–57
6	(French Federation of Basketball) Flammes Carolo Basket	12	3	9	792	912	−120	15		56–62	68–83	70–88	79–81	65–59	—

Source: EuroLeague Women
Legend: Blue = home team win; Red = away team win.
Rules for classification: 1) Points; 2) Points difference; 3) Points scored.
Notes:

10 December 2025
19:00 (CET)

Boxscore

ZVVZ USK Praha (Czech Basketball Federation)	64–55	(Turkish Basketball Federation) Galatasaray Cagdas Faktoring
Scoring by quarter: 19–16, 18–17, 16–11, 11–11
Pts: Astier 13; Rebs: Hof 9 Asts: Cazorla, Ayayi 4		Pts: Erdoğan, Juhász 11; Rebs: Kuier 9 Asts: Oblak 3

Královka Arena, Prague
Attendance: 786
Referees: Silvia Marziali (ITA), Viktor Nagy (HUN), Ewa Matuszewska (POL)

10 December 2025
19:30 (CET)

Boxscore

Spar Girona (Spanish Basketball Federation)	81–72	(Italian Basketball Federation) Beretta Famila Schio
Scoring by quarter: 21–19, 18–19, 23–19, 19–15
Pts: Amihere 23; Rebs: Coulibaly 9 Asts: Jocytė 7		Pts: Conde 20; Rebs: Shepard 9 Asts: Conde 4

Pavelló Fontajau, Girona
Attendance: 2,324
Referees: Viola Györgyi (NOR), Veronika Obertová (SVK), Sara Månsson (SWE)

10 December 2025
20:00 (CET)

Boxscore

Tango Bourges Basket (French Federation of Basketball)	85–57	(French Federation of Basketball) Flammes Carolo Basket
Scoring by quarter: 23–13, 19–20, 22–13, 21–11
Pts: Pouye 20; Rebs: Djaldi-Tabdi 10; Asts: Akoa Makani 8		Pts: Franchelin, Clarke 14; Rebs: Dixon 9 Asts: Brochant 5

Caisse d'Epargne Loire Centre - le Prado, Bourges
Attendance: 2,100
Referees: Jelena Tomić (CRO), Esperanza Mendoza (ESP), Suzana Vujičić (MNE)

17 December 2025
20:00 (TRT)

Boxscore

Galatasaray Cagdas Faktoring (Turkish Basketball Federation)	80–62	(French Federation of Basketball) Tango Bourges Basket
Scoring by quarter: 28–12, 16–12, 17–23, 19–15
Pts: Oblak 19; Rebs: Kuier 9 Asts: Smalls, Johannès 6		Pts: Pouye 19; Rebs: Djaldi-Tabdi, Diaby 7 Asts: Diaby, Pouye 4

Sinan Erdem Dome, Istanbul
Attendance: 695
Referees: Nataša Dragojević (MNE), Teo Miletić (CRO), Balázs Mészáros (HUN)

17 December 2025
19:30 (CET)

Boxscore

Flammes Carolo Basket (French Federation of Basketball)	68–83	(Spanish Basketball Federation) Spar Girona
Scoring by quarter: 14–17, 18–16, 12–30, 24–20
Pts: Dixon 12; Rebs: Dixon 7 Asts: Franchelin 6		Pts: Coulibaly 30; Rebs: Coulibaly 14; Asts: Jocytė, Quevedo 6

Caisse d' Epargne Arena, Charleville-Mézières
Attendance: 2,000
Referees: Oleksandr Dotsenko (LUX), Ewa Matuszewska (POL), Josh Bowe (GBR)

17 December 2025
20:00 (CET)

Boxscore

Beretta Famila Schio (Italian Basketball Federation)	99–78	(Czech Basketball Federation) ZVVZ USK Praha
Scoring by quarter: 22–21, 34–14, 21–23, 22–20
Pts: Shepard 23; Rebs: Shepard 8 Asts: Conde 9		Pts: Ayayi 27; Rebs: Čechová 9 Asts: Astier 7

Palazzetto Livio Romare, Schio
Attendance: 1,800
Referees: Özlem Yalman (TUR), Primož Pipan (SLO), Suzana Vujičić (MNE)

14 January 2026
19:00 (CET)

Boxscore

ZVVZ USK Praha (Czech Basketball Federation)	98–55	(French Federation of Basketball) Flammes Carolo Basket
Scoring by quarter: 29–9, 25–12, 17–21, 27–13
Pts: Carleton 29; Rebs: Ayayi 9 Asts: Ayayi 9		Pts: Clarke 10; Rebs: Dixon 8 Asts: Franchelin 7

Královka Arena, Prague
Attendance: 536
Referees: Nermin Hodzic (GER), Milita Stalaučinskaitė (LTU), Hendrik Laas (EST)

14 January 2026
19:30 (CET)

Boxscore

Spar Girona (Spanish Basketball Federation)	68–82	(Turkish Basketball Federation) Galatasaray Cagdas Faktoring
Scoring by quarter: 23–21, 17–14, 15–29, 13–18
Pts: Bibby 21; Rebs: Pendande 11; Asts: Holm 4		Pts: Juhász 23; Rebs: Juhász 9 Asts: Oblak 6

Pavelló Fontajau, Girona
Attendance: 2,518
Referees: Paulina Karolina Gajdosz (POL), Jelena Tomić (CRO), Sónia Teixeira (POR)

14 January 2026
20:00 (CET)

Boxscore

Tango Bourges Basket (French Federation of Basketball)	92–81	(Italian Basketball Federation) Beretta Famila Schio
Scoring by quarter: 25–27, 21–21, 22–20, 24–13
Pts: Pouye 18; Rebs: Djaldi-Tabdi 11; Asts: Duchet Pouye 6		Pts: Shepard 19; Rebs: Shepard 9 Asts: Conde 7

Caisse d'Epargne Loire Centre - le Prado, Bourges
Attendance: 2,603
Referees: Yasmina Alcaraz (ESP), Domen Krajnc (SLO), Jānis Rozenbergs (LAT)

21 January 2026
19:30 (CET)

Boxscore

Flammes Carolo Basket (French Federation of Basketball)	65–59	(French Federation of Basketball) Tango Bourges Basket
Scoring by quarter: 14–12, 15–9, 21–14, 15–24
Pts: Gomis 15; Rebs: Banaszak 6 Asts: Brochant 7		Pts: Guapo, Diaby 12; Rebs: Diaby 11; Asts: four players 4

Caisse d' Epargne Arena, Charleville-Mézières
Attendance: 1,500
Referees: Peter Zeniš (SVK), Hrvoje Čavar (BIH), Skirmantas Letukas (DEN)

22 January 2026
20:00 (TRT)

Boxscore

Galatasaray Cagdas Faktoring (Turkish Basketball Federation)	64–71	(Czech Basketball Federation) ZVVZ USK Praha
Scoring by quarter: 11–23, 20–25, 14–15, 19–8
Pts: Johannès 18; Rebs: Juhász, Kuier 6 Asts: Oblak, Erdoğan 4		Pts: Salaün, Astier 16; Rebs: Ayayi 8 Asts: Cazorla 7

Sinan Erdem Dome, Istanbul
Attendance: 881
Referees: Stylianos Simeonidis (GRE), Vlad-Theodor Cotrobaș-Dascălu (ROU), Sava Cetković (MNE)

22 January 2026
20:00 (CET)

Boxscore

Beretta Famila Schio (Italian Basketball Federation)	85–74	(Spanish Basketball Federation) Spar Girona
Scoring by quarter: 23–20, 22–20, 25–18, 15–16
Pts: Shepard 31; Rebs: Shepard 11; Asts: Conde 7		Pts: Quevedo 18; Rebs: Holm 8 Asts: Holm, Quevedo 5

Palazzetto Livio Romare, Schio
Attendance: 2,000
Referees: Emmouil Tsolakos (GRE), Gregor Oprčkal (SLO), Teo Miletić (CRO)

28 January 2026
19:00 (CET)

Boxscore

ZVVZ USK Praha (Czech Basketball Federation)	78–66	(Italian Basketball Federation) Beretta Famila Schio
Scoring by quarter: 24–13, 18–19, 19–23, 17–11
Pts: Carleton 19; Rebs: Hof 7 Asts: Cazorla 8		Pts: Shepard 20; Rebs: Shepard 9 Asts: Conde 7

Královka Arena, Prague
Attendance: 832
Referees: Viola Györgyi (NOR), Ivana Ivanović (SRB), Sara Månsson (SWE)

28 January 2026
19:30 (CET)

Boxscore

Spar Girona (Spanish Basketball Federation)	89–58	(French Federation of Basketball) Flammes Carolo Basket
Scoring by quarter: 28–11, 22–16, 23–11, 16–20
Pts: Bibby 21; Rebs: Holm 8 Asts: Carter 7		Pts: Dixon 13; Rebs: Dixon 7 Asts: Franchelin 6

Pavelló Fontajau, Girona
Attendance: 2,902
Referees: Nataša Dragojević (MNE), Ioannis Agrafiotis (GRE), Elvis Binders-Coders (LAT)

29 January 2026
20:00 (CET)

Boxscore

Tango Bourges Basket (French Federation of Basketball)	72–82	(Turkish Basketball Federation) Galatasaray Cagdas Faktoring
Scoring by quarter: 16–22, 12–26, 25–19, 19–15
Pts: Diaby, Pouye 15; Rebs: Diaby 11; Asts: Makani, Naigre 3		Pts: Johannès 22; Rebs: Kuier 8 Asts: Smalls 4

Caisse d'Epargne Loire Centre - le Prado, Bourges
Attendance: 3,362
Referees: Ivor Matějek (CZE), Zdenko Tomášovič (SVK), Viktor Nagy (HUN)

4 February 2026
20:00 (TRT)

Boxscore

Galatasaray Cagdas Faktoring (Turkish Basketball Federation)	67–57	(Spanish Basketball Federation) Spar Girona
Scoring by quarter: 16–10, 24–13, 20–13, 7–21
Pts: Juhász, Kuier 16; Rebs: Juhász 12; Asts: Oblak 7		Pts: Jocytė, Bibby 10; Rebs: Holm 7 Asts: Jocytė 6

Sinan Erdem Dome, Istanbul
Attendance: 200
Referees: Nemanja Ninković (SRB), Jelena Tomić (CRO), Rainis Värv (EST)

4 February 2026
19:30 (CET)

Boxscore

Flammes Carolo Basket (French Federation of Basketball)	70–88	(Czech Basketball Federation) ZVVZ USK Praha
Scoring by quarter: 19–24, 15–17, 24–23, 12–24
Pts: Clarke 15; Rebs: Brochant 7 Asts: Franchelin 9		Pts: Ayayi 21; Rebs: Hof, Astier 6 Asts: Astier 9

Caisse d' Epargne Arena, Charleville-Mézières
Attendance: 2,200
Referees: Çisil Güngör (TUR), Esperanza Mendoza (ESP), Martin Van Hoye (BEL)

4 February 2026
20:00 (CET)

Boxscore

Beretta Famila Schio (Italian Basketball Federation)	77–69	(French Federation of Basketball) Tango Bourges Basket
Scoring by quarter: 21–17, 19–18, 20–23, 17–11
Pts: Laksa 18; Rebs: Verona 8 Asts: Conde 7		Pts: Pouye 20; Rebs: Diaby 9 Asts: Duchet 4

Palazzetto Livio Romare, Schio
Attendance: 2,150
Referees: Mladen Lucić (MNE), Sónia Teixeira (POR), Alin Faur (ROU)

=== Group F ===
Pos	Team	Pld	W	L	PF	PA	PD	Pts	Qualification	FEN	LAN	REY	CAS	VAL	DVTK
1	(Turkish Basketball Federation) Fenerbahçe Opet	12	11	1	1011	753	+258	23	Semifinal play-in	—	78–69	96–48	69–67	71–49	113–65
2	(French Federation of Basketball) Basket Landes	12	8	4	828	780	+48	20	Semifinal play-in	80–61	—	63–57	70–73	57–66	79–59
3	(Italian Basketball Federation) Umana Reyer Venezia	12	7	5	812	858	−46	19 (Note: Umana Reyer Venezia 152–141 Casademont Zaragoza)	Quarterfinal play-in	61–71	57–56	—	68–61	69–55	83–81
4	(Spanish Basketball Federation) Casademont Zaragoza	12	7	5	871	815	+56	19	Quarterfinal play-in	64–95	63–65	80–84	—	81–71	66–40
5	(Spanish Basketball Federation) Valencia Basket	12	6	6	905	825	+80	18		72–75	72–76	81–73	63–70	—	81–58
6	(Hungarian Basketball Federation) DVTK HUN-Therm	12	1	11	768	969	−201	13		58–89	70–77	69–71	60–79	64–99	—

Source: EuroLeague Women
Legend: Blue = home team win; Red = away team win.
Rules for classification: 1) Points; 2) Points difference; 3) Points scored.
Notes:

9 December 2025
19:15 (CET)

Boxscore

Valencia Basket (Spanish Basketball Federation)	63–70	(Spanish Basketball Federation) Casademont Zaragoza
Scoring by quarter: 25–14, 16–11, 15–15, 7–30
Pts: Fiebich 14; Rebs: Casas 9 Asts: Romero 4		Pts: Leite 23; Rebs: Hempe 9 Asts: Ortiz, Flores 5

Roig Arena, Valencia
Attendance: 2,963
Referees: Paulina Karolina Gajdosz (POL), Diogo Martins (POR), Oleksandr Dotsenko (LUX)

10 December 2025
20:00 (TRT)

Boxscore

Fenerbahçe Opet (Turkish Basketball Federation)	96–48	(Italian Basketball Federation) Umana Reyer Venezia
Scoring by quarter: 30–2, 23–19, 22–20, 21–7
Pts: Rupert 20; Rebs: Gustafson 13; Asts: Allemand10		Pts: Dojkić 14; Rebs: Nicolodi 7 Asts: Pasa 4

Ülker Sports and Event Hall, Istanbul
Attendance: 3,422
Referees: Nataša Dragojević (MNE), Sónia Teixeira (POR), Primož Pipan (SLO)

10 December 2025
18:00 (CET)

Boxscore

DVTK HUN-Therm (Hungarian Basketball Federation)	70–77	(French Federation of Basketball) Basket Landes
Scoring by quarter: 13–14, 22–27, 9–17, 26–19
Pts: Lelik 14; Rebs: Miklos, Smuda 4 Asts: Aho 6		Pts: Musa 18; Rebs: Musa 6 Asts: Djekoundade 3

DVTK Arena, Miskolc
Attendance: 2,000
Referees: Yasmina Alcaraz (ESP), Özlem Yalman (TUR), Megaklis-Konstantinos Marinakis (GRE)

18 December 2025
19:30 (CET)

Boxscore

Basket Landes (French Federation of Basketball)	57–66	(Spanish Basketball Federation) Valencia Basket
Scoring by quarter: 20–14, 8–12, 13–21, 16–19
Pts: Massey 14; Rebs: Musa 10; Asts: Pardon 4		Pts: Fiebich 13; Rebs: Fam 8 Asts: Araújo, Romero 4

Espace François Mitterrand, Mont-de-Marsan
Attendance: 2,600
Referees: Marek Kukelčík (SVK), Gabrielius Simonavičius (LTU), Hendrik Laas (EST)

18 December 2025
19:30 (CET)

Boxscore

Umana Reyer Venezia (Italian Basketball Federation)	83–81	(Hungarian Basketball Federation) DVTK HUN-Therm
Scoring by quarter: 19–17, 26–24, 11–23, 27–17
Pts: Holmes 15; Rebs: Cubaj 9 Asts: Charles 5		Pts: Westbeld 19; Rebs: Smuda 5 Asts: Aho, Lelik 5

Palasport Taliercio, Venice
Attendance: 658
Referees: Jelena Tomić (CRO), Ivana Ivanović (SRB), Azra Mušić (SLO)

18 December 2025
20:00 (CET)

Boxscore

Casademont Zaragoza (Spanish Basketball Federation)	64–95	(Turkish Basketball Federation) Fenerbahçe Opet
Scoring by quarter: 15–32, 21–23, 13–21, 15–19
Pts: Hempe 18; Rebs: Hempe 10; Asts: Ortiz 9		Pts: Gustafson 27; Rebs: Meesseman 11; Asts: Allemand 7

Pabellón Príncipe Felipe, Zaragoza
Attendance: 6,170
Referees: Veronika Obertová (SVK), Tiago Roxo Perdigão (POR), José Pedroso (POR)

14 January 2026
18:00 (CET)

Boxscore

DVTK HUN-Therm (Hungarian Basketball Federation)	60–79	(Spanish Basketball Federation) Casademont Zaragoza
Scoring by quarter: 14–20, 9–21, 16–22, 21–16
Pts: Grigalauskytė 9 Rebs: Ginzo 5 Asts: Lelik 4		Pts: Pueyo 21; Rebs: Fingall 8 Asts: Ortiz 7

DVTK Arena, Miskolc
Attendance: 1,400
Referees: Özlem Yalman (TUR), Silvia Marziali (ITA), Laure Coanus (FRA)

14 January 2026
19:15 (CET)

Boxscore

Valencia Basket (Spanish Basketball Federation)	81–73	(Italian Basketball Federation) Umana Reyer Venezia
Scoring by quarter: 21–26, 21–18, 16–17, 23–12
Pts: Alexander 15; Rebs: three players 5 Asts: Fiebich 7		Pts: Holmes 15; Rebs: Holmes 5 Asts: Charles 6

Roig Arena, Valencia
Attendance: 2,986
Referees: Nataša Dragojević (MNE), Sara Månsson (SVE), José Pedroso (POR)

14 January 2026
19:30 (CET)

Boxscore

Basket Landes (French Federation of Basketball)	80–61	(Turkish Basketball Federation) Fenerbahçe Opet
Scoring by quarter: 28–18, 15–16, 17–14, 20–13
Pts: Lacan 28; Rebs: Musa 10; Asts: Droguet 4		Pts: Rupert 14; Rebs: Meesseman, Milić 5 Asts: Meesseman 8

Espace François Mitterrand, Mont-de-Marsan
Attendance: 2,600
Referees: Esperanza Mendoza (ESP), Ivana Ivanović (SRB), Karol Kowalski (FIN)

21 January 2026
19:30 (CET)

Boxscore

Basket Landes (French Federation of Basketball)	79–59	(Hungarian Basketball Federation) DVTK HUN-Therm
Scoring by quarter: 17–18, 19–12, 23–9, 20–20
Pts: Droguet 14; Rebs: Musa 10; Asts: Pardon 5		Pts: Westbeld 13; Rebs: Ginzo 6 Asts: Lelik 7

Espace François Mitterrand, Mont-de-Marsan
Attendance: 2,600
Referees: Nikola Perlić (CRO), Josh Bowe (GBR), Oleksandr Dotsenko (LUX)

21 January 2026
20:00 (CET)

Boxscore

Casademont Zaragoza (Spanish Basketball Federation)	81–71	(Spanish Basketball Federation) Valencia Basket
Scoring by quarter: 21–20, 19–14, 23–21, 18–16
Pts: Hempe 20; Rebs: Gueye 8 Asts: Pueyo 7		Pts: Araújo, Fiebich 16; Rebs: Carrera 7 Asts: Romero 6

Pabellón Príncipe Felipe, Zaragoza
Attendance: 8,457
Referees: Paulina Karolina Gajdosz (POL), Gavin Williams (GBR), Jan Baloun (CZE)

22 January 2026
19:30 (CET)

Boxscore

Umana Reyer Venezia (Italian Basketball Federation)	61–71	(Turkish Basketball Federation) Fenerbahçe Opet
Scoring by quarter: 12–27, 18–24, 19–8, 12–12
Pts: Dojkić 17; Rebs: Mavunga, Holmes 6 Asts: Charles, Dojkić 3		Pts: Williams, Rupert 18; Rebs: Allemand 8 Asts: Allemand 6

Palasport Taliercio, Venice
Attendance: 940
Referees: Nemanja Ninković (SRB), Alin Faur (ROU), Nace Mohorič (SLO)

28 January 2026
20:00 (TRT)

Boxscore

Fenerbahçe Opet (Turkish Basketball Federation)	69–67	(Spanish Basketball Federation) Casademont Zaragoza
Scoring by quarter: 22–21, 25–13, 6–19, 16–14
Pts: Meesseman 21; Rebs: Rupert 8 Asts: Allemand 5		Pts: Leite 12; Rebs: Voráčková 7 Asts: Ortiz 5

Ülker Sports and Event Hall, Istanbul
Attendance: 2,000
Referees: Siniša Prpa (SRB), Hendrik Laas (EST), Sava Cetković (MNE)

28 January 2026
18:00 (CET)

Boxscore

DVTK HUN-Therm (Hungarian Basketball Federation)	69–71	(Italian Basketball Federation) Umana Reyer Venezia
Scoring by quarter: 18–22, 14–25, 16–14, 21–10
Pts: Lelik 21; Rebs: Ginzo 9 Asts: Aho, Ginzo 3		Pts: Holmes 17; Rebs: Charles 10; Asts: Mavunga 4

DVTK Arena, Miskolc
Attendance: 1,300
Referees: Çisil Güngör (TUR), Veronika Obertová (SVK), Ewa Matuszewska (POL)

28 January 2026
19:15 (CET)

Boxscore

Valencia Basket (Spanish Basketball Federation)	72–76	(French Federation of Basketball) Basket Landes
Scoring by quarter: 21–14, 14–21, 19–14, 18–27
Pts: Fiebich 16; Rebs: Araújo, Fiebich 6 Asts: Romero 4		Pts: Musa 26; Rebs: Musa 9 Asts: Pardon 4

Roig Arena, Valencia
Attendance: 3,995
Referees: Sónia Teixeira (POR), Jelena Tomić (CRO), Blaž Zupančič (SLO)

4 February 2026
20:00 (TRT)

Boxscore

Fenerbahçe Opet (Turkish Basketball Federation)	78–69	(French Federation of Basketball) Basket Landes
Scoring by quarter: 21–27, 15–8, 16–18, 26–16
Pts: Meesseman 21; Rebs: Williams 9 Asts: Allemand 10		Pts: Lacan 11; Rebs: Macquet 7 Asts: Lacan 7

Ülker Sports and Event Hall, Istanbul
Attendance: 1,500
Referees: Viola Györgyi (NOR), Sara Månsson (SWE), Armin Mutapčić (GER)

4 February 2026
19:30 (CET)

Boxscore

Umana Reyer Venezia (Italian Basketball Federation)	69–55	(Spanish Basketball Federation) Valencia Basket
Scoring by quarter: 23–16, 10–8, 19–12, 17–19
Pts: Dojkić 15; Rebs: Charles 11; Asts: four players 4		Pts: Romero, Carrera 12; Rebs: Fam 11; Asts: Anderson 3

Palasport Taliercio, Venice
Attendance: 857
Referees: Nataša Dragojević (MNE), Nikola Perlić (CRO), Jan Baloun (CZE)

4 February 2026
20:00 (CET)

Boxscore

Casademont Zaragoza (Spanish Basketball Federation)	66–40	(Hungarian Basketball Federation) DVTK HUN-Therm
Scoring by quarter: 21–12, 15–9, 19–9, 11–10
Pts: Bankole 13; Rebs: three players 7 Asts: Ortiz 4		Pts: Ginzo 14; Rebs: Westbeld 7 Asts: Tomán 4

Pabellón Príncipe Felipe, Zaragoza
Attendance: 6,189
Referees: Juozas Barkauskas (LTU), Elvis Binders-Coders (LAT), Vlad-Theodor Cotrobaș-Dăscălu (ROU)

== Matchday reports ==
Reference
Matchday 1
Matchday 2
Matchday 3
Matchday 4
Matchday 5
Matchday 6
Matchday 7
Matchday 8
Matchday 9
Matchday 10
Matchday 11
Matchday 12

== See also ==
- 2025–26 EuroLeague Women
- 2025–26 EuroLeague Women Play-ins
- 2026 EuroLeague Women Final Six
- 2025–26 EuroCup Women
- 2025 FIBA Europe SuperCup Women
- 2025–26 EuroLeague Women qualification round
- 2025–26 EuroCup Women qualification round
- 2025–26 EuroCup Women regular season
- 2025–26 EuroCup Women knockout stage
