= 2018–19 WPBL season =

Russian Women's Basketball Premier League

Russian Women's Basketball Premier League
- League: Russian Women's Basketball Premier League
- Season: 2018–19
- Duration: 3 October 2018 – 1 March 2019 (Regular season); 17 March – 25 April 2019 (Playoffs); 28 March – 30 April 2019 (Placement round)
- Games played: 141
- Teams: 10

Regular season
- Season MVP: (United States) Brittney Griner (UMMC Ekaterinburg)

Finals
- Champions: UMMC Ekaterinburg (13th title)
- Runners-up: Dynamo Kursk

Statistical leaders
Points	(United States) Jamie Scott	19.2
Rebounds	(United States) Talia Caldwell	11.4
Assists	(Hungary) Courtney Vandersloot	6.0

Records
- Biggest home win: UMMC 115–39 MBA Moscow (25 November 2018)
- Biggest away win: Spartak Noginsk 28–107 UMMC (3 October 2018)
- Highest scoring: Dynamo Moscow 87–116 Enisey (28 February 2019)
- Winning streak: 17 games UMMC Ekaterinburg
- Losing streak: 23 games Dynamo Moscow

The 2018–19 WPBL season was the 28th season of the Russian Women's Basketball Premier League. UMMC Ekaterinburg were the defending champions.

== Regular season ==
Pos	Team	Pld	W	L	PF	PA	PD	Pts	Qualification
1	UMMC Ekaterinburg	18	17	1	1767	984	+783	35	Playoffs
2	Dynamo Kursk	18	17	1	1584	1038	+546	35	Playoffs
3	Nadezhda Orenburg	18	13	5	1330	1128	+202	31	Playoffs
4	MBA Moscow	18	10	8	1308	1303	+5	28	Playoffs
5	Inventa Kursk	18	10	8	1272	1272	0	28	Playoffs
6	Enisey Krasnoyarsk	18	9	9	1368	1440	−72	27	Playoffs
7	Sparta & K	18	7	11	1359	1501	−142	25	Playoffs
8	Dynamo Novosibirsk	18	5	13	1102	1383	−281	23	Playoffs
9	Spartak Noginsk	18	2	16	984	1457	−473	20	Placement round
10	Dynamo Moscow	18	0	18	1051	1619	−568	18	Placement round

Source: RBF

== Playoffs ==
Quarterfinals
1 UMMC Ekaterinburg	95	90
8 Dynamo Novosibirsk	53	52
4 MBA Moscow	74	93
5 Inventa Kursk	64	63
2 Dynamo Kursk	109	101
7 Sparta & K	55	46
3 Nadezhda Orenburg	96	75	65
6 Enisey Krasnoyarsk	79	82	61

Semifinals
1 UMMC Ekaterinburg	114	121	90
4 MBA Moscow	72	57	50
2 Dynamo Kursk	78	90	88
3 Nadezhda Orenburg	50	60	66

Final
1 UMMC Ekaterinburg	78	64	68
2 Dynamo Kursk	66	51	64
Third place
3 Nadezhda Orenburg	81	78	69
4 MBA Moscow	68	48	65

== Placement round ==
Pos	Team	Pld	W	L	PF	PA	PD	Pts
5	Inventa Kursk	20	15	5	1561	1360	+201	35
6	Sparta & K	20	13	7	1524	1390	+134	33
7	Enisey Krasnoyarsk	20	13	7	1623	1414	+209	33
8	Dynamo Novosibirsk	20	12	8	1406	1380	+26	32
9	Spartak Noginsk	20	6	14	1296	1490	−194	26
10	Dynamo Moscow	20	1	19	1289	1665	−376	21

Source: RBF

== Russian clubs in European competitions ==
Club	Competition	Progress
UMMC Ekaterinburg	EuroLeague	Champions
Dynamo Kursk	EuroLeague	Runners-up
Nadezhda Orenburg	EuroLeague	Regular season
Nadezhda Orenburg	EuroCup	Champions
Enisey Krasnoyarsk	EuroCup	Play-off Round 1
MBA Moscow	EuroCup	Round of 16
Sparta & K	EuroCup	Play-off Round 1
Inventa Kursk	EuroCup	Regular season
Spartak Noginsk	EuroCup	Qualification round
