= List of 2018–19 WPBL season transactions =

This is a list of transactions that have taken place during the off-season and the 2018–19 WPBL season.

== Front office movements ==
=== Head coach changes ===
Off-season

Departure date	Team	Outgoing head coach	Reason for departure	Hire date	Incoming head coach	Last coaching position	Ref.
	TBA						

== Player movement ==
=== Free agency ===
Player	Date signed	New team	Former team	Ref
(Spain) Alba Torrens	March 28	UMMC Ekaterinburg		
(United States) Erica Wheeler	May 24	Nadezhda Orenburg	Beşiktaş (TUR)	
(Canada) Adut Bulgak	May 24	Nadezhda Orenburg	Elitzur Ramla (ISR)	
(Russia) Lyudmila Sapova	May 28	MBA Moscow		
(Spain) Sandra Ygueravide	May 29	Nadezhda Orenburg		
(Russia) Natalya Dorovskikh	June 18	Enisey Krasnoyarsk		
(United States) Breanna Stewart	June 22	Dynamo Kursk	Shanghai Baoshan Dahua (CHN)	
(Russia) Anzhela Yakimova	June 22	Enisey Krasnoyarsk		
(United States) Angel McCoughtry	June 25	UMMC Ekaterinburg	Dynamo Kursk	
(Spain) Anna Cruz	July 17	Dynamo Kursk		
(Russia) Epiphanny Prince	July 17	Dynamo Kursk		
(United States) Myisha Hines-Allen	July 17	Enisey Krasnoyarsk	Louisville Cardinals (USA)	
(United States) Stephanie Mavunga	July 21	Enisey Krasnoyarsk	Ohio State Buckeyes (USA)	
(Russia) Olga Vorobyeva	August 2	Enisey Krasnoyarsk		
(Russia) Natalia Anoykina	August 4	Dynamo Kursk	Enisey Krasnoyarsk	
(The Bahamas) Jonquel Jones	August 23	UMMC Ekaterinburg	Shanxi Flame (CHN)	
(Hungary) Courtney Vandersloot	August 23	UMMC Ekaterinburg	Yakın Doğu Üniversitesi (TUR)	
(United States) Kayla McBride	September 1	UMMC Ekaterinburg	Yakın Doğu Üniversitesi (TUR)	
(Puerto Rico) Jennifer O'Neill	September 7	Spartak Moscow	Artego Bydgoszcz (POL)	
(Russia) Veronika Dorosheva	September 18	Enisey Krasnoyarsk	Dynamo Novosibirsk	
(Russia) Alexandra Stolyar	September 19	MBA Moscow	Kazanochka	
(Russia) Varvara Psareva	September 19	MBA Moscow	Kazanochka	
(Russia) Tatiana Grigoreva	September 19	Enisey Krasnoyarsk	Dynamo Novosibirsk	
(Canada) Miah-Marie Langlois	September 19	Dynamo Novosibirsk		
(United States) Brionna Jones	September 19	Nadezhda Orenburg		
(Russia) Maria Vadeeva	September 19	UMMC Ekaterinburg	Dynamo Kursk	

=== Going overseas ===
Player	Date signed	New team	Former team	Ref
(Russia) Albina Razheva	May 26	BC Castors Braine (BEL)	Dynamo Moscow	
(France) Héléna Ciak	May 31	Basket Lattes (FRA)	Dynamo Kursk	
(United States) Emma Cannon	June 10	Basket 90 Gdynia (POL)	Nadezhda Orenburg	
(United States) Maegan Conwright	July 4	Politechnika Gdanska (POL)	Dynamo Novosibirsk	
(Russia) Julia Gladkova	July 13	Bembibre PDM (FRA)	Spartak Moscow	
(United States) Jacinta Monroe	August 5	Canik (TUR)	Enisey Krasnoyarsk	
(United States) Kelsey Lang	August 21	Csata DSE Budapest (HUN)	Dynamo Moscow	

== See also ==
- 2018–19 WPBL season
- List of 2018–19 WPBL team rosters
