= 2024–25 Russian Women's Basketball Premier League =

Women's basketball league in Russia

Russian Women's Basketball Premier League
- Season: 2024–25
- Dates: Regular season: 3 October 2024 – 31 January 2025; Winners and losers stage: 12 February – 22 March 2025; Play Offs: 9 April – 2 May 2025
- Teams: 11

Regular season
- Season MVP: (United States) Unique Thompson

Finals
- Champions: UMMC Ekaterinburg (18th title)
- Runners-up: Nadezhda Orenburg
- Finals MVP: (Russia) Maria Klyundikova

Statistical leaders
Points	(United States) Aliyah Mazyck	19.1
Rebounds	(United States) Unique Thompson	10.3
Assists	(Russia) Mariya Krymova	4.5
Steals	(Russia) Tatiana Vidmer	2.7
Blocks	(United States) Malury Bates	1.4

The 2024–25 Russian Women's Basketball Premier League is the 34th season of the top division women's basketball league in Russia since its establishment in 1992. It starts in October 2024 with the first round of the regular season and ends in May 2025.

UMMC Ekaterinburg are the defending champions.

UMMC Ekaterinburg won their eighteenth title after beating Nadezhda Orenburg in the final.

== Format ==
In the first round, each team plays each other twice. The top six progress to the winners stage while the bottom five advance to the losers stage. In the winners stage, teams play each other twice and every team reaches the play offs. In the losers stage, teams play each other twice and the teams who finish in sixth, seventh and eighth place advance to the play offs. The quarterfinals are played as a best of three series while the semifinals and the final are played as a best of five series. The clubs that don't qualify for the play offs play in the 9–11 classification group and the teams who lose at the quarterfinal stage play in the 5–8 classification group.

== Regular season ==
Pos	Team	Pld	W	L	PF	PA	PD	Pts	Qualification
1	UMMC Ekaterinburg	20	19	1	1683	1221	+462	39	Winners stage
2	MBA Moscow	20	14	6	1390	1326	+64	34	Winners stage
3	Dynamo Kursk	20	13	7	1462	1271	+191	33 (Note: Dynamo Kursk 143–127 Nika Syktyvkar)	Winners stage
4	Nika Syktyvkar	20	13	7	1416	1376	+40	33	Winners stage
5	Nadezhda Orenburg	20	12	8	1407	1293	+114	32	Winners stage
6	Enisey Krasnoyarsk	20	10	10	1296	1321	−25	30	Winners stage
7	Dynamo Novosibirsk	20	9	11	1331	1411	−80	29	Losers stage
8	Spartak Moscow	20	7	13	1307	1418	−111	27 (Note: Spartak Moscow 140–134 Samara)	Losers stage
9	Samara	20	7	13	1293	1417	−124	27	Losers stage
10	Neftyanik Omsk	20	4	16	1190	1452	−262	24	Losers stage
11	Dynamo Moscow	20	2	18	1214	1483	−269	22	Losers stage

Source: Russian Women's Basketball Premier League
Rules for classification: 1) Points; 2) Points difference; 3) Points scored.

=== Winners stage ===
Pos	Team	Pld	W	L	PF	PA	PD	Pts	Qualification
1	UMMC Ekaterinburg	30	29	1	2537	1841	+696	59	Play Offs
2	MBA Moscow	30	19	11	2067	2034	+33	49	Play Offs
3	Dynamo Kursk	30	18	12	2155	1944	+211	48	Play Offs
4	Nadezhda Orenburg	30	17	13	2082	1971	+111	47	Play Offs
5	Nika Syktyvkar	30	15	15	2085	2156	−71	45	Play Offs
6	Enisey Krasnoyarsk	30	13	17	1945	2079	−134	43	Play Offs

Source: Russian Women's Basketball Premier League
Rules for classification: 1) Points; 2) Points difference; 3) Points scored.

=== Losers stage ===
Pos	Team	Pld	W	L	PF	PA	PD	Pts	Qualification
7	Dynamo Novosibirsk	28	14	14	1890	1941	−51	42	Play Offs
8	Spartak Moscow	28	12	16	1863	1953	−90	40	Play Offs
9	Samara	28	10	18	1806	1958	−152	38	9–11 classification group
10	Neftyanik Omsk	28	8	20	1706	1965	−259	36	9–11 classification group
11	Dynamo Moscow	28	5	23	1721	2015	−294	33	9–11 classification group

Source: Russian Women's Basketball Premier League
Rules for classification: 1) Points; 2) Points difference; 3) Points scored.

== Play offs ==
In the play offs, a reseeding process took place for the semifinals.

Quarterfinals
1	UMMC Ekaterinburg	77	99	2
8	Spartak Moscow	44	61	0
3	Dynamo Kursk	76	60	60	1
6	Enisey Krasnoyarsk	46	63	68	2
2	MBA Moscow	81	72	2
7	Dynamo Novosibirsk	67	65	0
4	Nadezhda Orenburg	62	79	2
5	Nika Syktyvkar	61	59	0

Semifinals
1	UMMC Ekaterinburg	97	86	84	3
6	Enisey Krasnoyarsk	70	62	64	0
2	MBA Moscow	53	82	49	66	1
4	Nadezhda Orenburg	78	79	63	80	3

Final
1	UMMC Ekaterinburg	91	78	88	3
4	Nadezhda Orenburg	83	59	56	0
Third place
2	MBA Moscow	86	59	80	76	3
6	Enisey Krasnoyarsk	73	69	60	64	1

=== 5–8 classification group ===
Pos	Team	Pld	W	L	PF	PA	PD	Pts	Qualification
5	Dynamo Kursk	3	3	0	259	226	+33	6	Fifth place
6	Nika Syktyvkar	3	2	1	222	221	+1	5	Sixth place
7	Spartak Moscow	3	1	2	206	208	−2	4	Seventh place
8	Dynamo Novosibirsk	3	0	3	218	250	−32	3	Eighth place

Source: Russian Women's Basketball Premier League
Rules for classification: 1) Points; 2) Points difference; 3) Points scored.

=== 9–11 classification group ===
Pos	Team	Pld	W	L	PF	PA	PD	Pts	Qualification
9	Neftyanik Omsk	4	2	2	257	236	+21	6	Ninth place
10	Dynamo Moscow	4	2	2	252	256	−4	6	Tenth place
11	Samara	4	2	2	256	273	−17	6	Eleventh place

Source: Russian Women's Basketball Premier League
Rules for classification: 1) Points; 2) Points difference; 3) Points scored.

Champions of Russia

UMMC Ekaterinburg
Eighteenth title
