= 2018–19 EuroLeague Women =

EuroLeague Women
- Season: 2018–19
- Dates: 8–17 October 2018 (qualifying); 24 October 2018 – 14 April 2019 (competition proper)
- Games played: 132
- Teams: 16 (competition proper); 20 (total)

Regular season
- Season MVP: (United States) Breanna Stewart (Dynamo Kursk)

Finals
- Champions: (Russia) UMMC Ekaterinburg (5th title)
- Runners-up: (Russia) Dynamo Kursk
- Third place: (Czech Republic) ZVVZ USK Praha
- Fourth place: (Hungary) Sopron Basket
- Final Four MVP: (United States) Brittney Griner (UMMC Ekaterinburg)

Statistical leaders
Points	(United States) Breanna Stewart	21.0
Rebounds	(United States) Brionna Jones	10.9
Assists	(France) Amel Bouderra	6.9

The 2018–19 EuroLeague Women was the 61st edition of the European women's club basketball championship organized by FIBA, and the 23rd edition since being rebranded as the EuroLeague Women.

== Team allocation ==
A total of 20 teams from 11 countries participated in the 2018–19 EuroLeague Women.

=== Teams ===
League positions of the previous season shown in parentheses (TH: EuroLeague Women title holders):

Regular season
(Belgium) Castors Braine (1st)	(France) Flammes Carolo Basket (3rd)	(Poland) CCC Polkowice (1st)	(Spain) Perfumerías Avenida (1st)
(Czech Republic) USK Praha (1st)	(Hungary) Sopron Basket (1st)	(Russia) Dynamo Kursk (2nd)	(Turkey) Fenerbahçe (1st)
(France) Tango Bourges Basket (1st)	(Italy) Famila Schio (1st)	(Russia) UMMC Ekaterinburg^{TH} (1st)	(Turkey) Hatay BB (3rd)
Qualifying round
(France) ESBVA-LM (5th)	(Hungary) KSC Szekszárd (2nd)	(Latvia) TTT Riga (1st)	(Russia) Nadezhda Orenburg (3rd)
(Greece) Olympiacos (1st)	(Italy) Reyer Venezia (3rd)	(Poland) Wisła Can-Pack (4th)	(Turkey) Çukurova Basketbol (4th)

== Round and draw dates ==
=== Schedule ===
Phase	Round	Draw date	Round date
Qualifying round	First leg	5 July 2018	8–10 October 2018
Qualifying round	Second leg	5 July 2018	11–17 October 2018
Regular season	Matchday 1	5 July 2018	24–25 October 2018
Regular season	Matchday 2	5 July 2018	31 October – 1 November 2018
Regular season	Matchday 3	5 July 2018	7 November 2018
Regular season	Matchday 4	5 July 2018	28–29 November 2018
Regular season	Matchday 5	5 July 2018	5–6 December 2018
Regular season	Matchday 6	5 July 2018	12–13 December 2018
Regular season	Matchday 7	5 July 2018	19–20 December 2018
Regular season	Matchday 8	5 July 2018	9–10 January 2019
Regular season	Matchday 9	5 July 2018	16–17 January 2019
Regular season	Matchday 10	5 July 2018	23–24 January 2019
Regular season	Matchday 11	5 July 2018	29–31 January 2019
Regular season	Matchday 12	5 July 2018	6–7 February 2019
Regular season	Matchday 13	5 July 2018	13–14 February 2019
Regular season	Matchday 14	5 July 2018	20 February 2019
Quarterfinals	First leg	5 July 2018	5 March 2019
Quarterfinals	Second leg	5 July 2018	8 March 2019
Final Four	Semifinals	5 July 2018	12 April 2019
Final Four	Final	5 July 2018	14 April 2019

=== Draw ===
The draw was held on 5 July 2018 at the FIBA headquarters in Munich, Germany. The 16 teams were drawn into two groups of eight. For the draw, the teams were seeded into eight seeds.

Seed 1	Seed 2	Seed 3	Seed 4
(Russia) UMMC Ekaterinburg (Russia) Dynamo Kursk	(Turkey) Fenerbahçe (Czech Republic) ZVVZ USK Praha	(Hungary) Sopron Basket (France) Tango Bourges Basket	(Italy) Famila Schio (Spain) Perfumerías Avenida

Seed 5	Seed 6	Seed 7	Seed 8
(Turkey) Hatay BB (Belgium) Castors Braine	(France) Flammes Carolo Basket (Poland) CCC Polkowice	Qualifier 1 Qualifier 2	Qualifier 3 Qualifier 4

== Qualifying round ==
Team 1	Agg.	Team 2	1st leg	2nd leg
Çukurova Basketbol (Turkey)	132–136	(Russia) Nadezhda Orenburg	58–60	74–76
Olympiacos (Greece)	110–109	(Poland) Wisła Can-Pack	63–63	47–46
KSC Szekszárd (Hungary)	132–145	(France) ESBVA-LM	71–68	61–77
TTT Riga (Latvia)	140–112	(Italy) Reyer Venezia	67–56	73–56

== Regular season ==
Location of teams of the 2018–19 Euroleague Women regular season.
Red: Group A; Green: Group B.

The regular season started on 24 October 2018 and ended on 20 February 2019.

The four top teams of each group qualified for the quarterfinals.

If teams are level on record at the end of the Regular Season, tiebreakers are applied in the following order:

1. Head-to-head record
2. Head-to-head point differential
3. Head-to-head points scored
4. Point differential for the entire regular season
5. Points scored for the entire regular season

=== Group A ===
Pos	Team	Pld	W	L	PF	PA	PD	Pts	Qualification	EKA	USK	BOU	POL	NAD	FAM	ESB	CAS
1	(Russia) UMMC Ekaterinburg	14	13	1	1155	859	+296	27	Advance to quarterfinals	—	87–59	70–65	69–54	77–52	77–46	100–75	103–53
2	(Czech Republic) ZVVZ USK Praha	14	10	4	1119	1005	+114	24	Advance to quarterfinals	82–73	—	88–80	78–53	86–90	77–80	84–68	82–63
3	(France) Tango Bourges Basket	14	9	5	1042	940	+102	23	Advance to quarterfinals	70–74	81–70	—	76–65	74–59	70–75	83–62	83–55
4	(Poland) CCC Polkowice	14	7	7	930	913	+17	21 (Note: CCC Polkowice 2–0; Nadezhda Orenburg 0–2)	Advance to quarterfinals	64–69	74–79	56–73	—	70–36	67–61	86–66	71–52
5	(Russia) Nadezhda Orenburg	14	7	7	899	950	−51	21	Transfer to EuroCup Women	51–80	78–83	72–65	55–59	—	67–51	72–49	85–56
6	(Italy) Famila Schio	14	5	9	912	955	−43	19	Transfer to EuroCup Women	68–82	50–69	55–66	83–69	82–50	—	75–81	76–48
7	(France) ESBVA-LM	14	4	10	875	1047	−172	18	Eliminated	51–99	62–101	74–78	45–48	49–61	69–50	—	73–61
8	(Belgium) Castors Braine	14	1	13	840	1103	−263	15	Eliminated	69–95	66–81	65–78	71–94	69–71	63–60	49–51	—

Source: FIBA

=== Group B ===
Pos	Team	Pld	W	L	PF	PA	PD	Pts	Qualification	KUR	SOP	FEN	TTT	AVE	CAR	HAT	OLY
1	(Russia) Dynamo Kursk	14	13	1	1046	913	+133	27	Advance to quarterfinals	—	83–93	64–63	73–70	69–51	83–62	85–71	75–58
2	(Hungary) Sopron Basket	14	8	6	1010	937	+73	22 (Note: Sopron Basket 2–2, +15PD; Fenerbahçe 2–2, +1PD; TTT Riga 2–2, –16PD)	Advance to quarterfinals	58–65	—	80–84	68–55	66–68	80–52	64–52	85–69
3	(Turkey) Fenerbahçe	14	8	6	1038	981	+57	22	Advance to quarterfinals	71–75	69–67	—	61–62	64–62	84–75	87–74	76–68
4	(Latvia) TTT Riga	14	8	6	1005	911	+94	22	Advance to quarterfinals	69–70	71–79	68–64	—	56–68	93–62	87–36	70–44
5	(Spain) Perfumerías Avenida	14	7	7	963	969	−6	21	Transfer to EuroCup Women	56–58	70–78	88–82	61–82	—	78–75	65–73	72–48
6	(France) Flammes Carolo Basket	14	5	9	1007	1120	−113	19 (Note: Flammes Carolo Basket 1–1, +3PD; Hatay BB 1–1, –3PD)	Transfer to EuroCup Women	62–86	80–74	94–92	100–75	62–75	—	90–79	73–68
7	(Turkey) Hatay BB	14	5	9	940	1063	−123	19	Eliminated	62–87	56–66	50–78	74–77	88–80	74–66	—	71–55
8	(Greece) Olympiacos	14	2	12	868	983	−115	16	Eliminated	67–73	63–52	54–63	51–70	68–69	79–54	76–80	—

Source: FIBA

== Quarterfinals ==
Team 1	Series	Team 2	Game 1	Game 2	Game 3
UMMC Ekaterinburg (Russia)	2–0	(Latvia) TTT Riga	78–45	77–55	
Sopron Basket (Hungary)	2–0	(France) Tango Bourges Basket	66–65	74–64	
ZVVZ USK Praha (Czech Republic)	2–0	(Turkey) Fenerbahçe	76–54	77–65	
Dynamo Kursk (Russia)	2–0	(Poland) CCC Polkowice	89–53	81–77	

=== First leg ===
5 March 2019	UMMC Ekaterinburg (Russia)	78–45 (Series: 1–0)	(Latvia) TTT Riga	Yekaterinburg
19:00 (UTC+5)	Scoring by quarter: 18–6, 21–7, 16–16, 23–16
	Pts: Vadeeva 23; Rebs: Vadeeva 10; Asts: Vandersloot 10	Boxscore	Pts: Kūlīte 15; Rebs: Brumermane, Vītola 5 Asts: Baško, Peddy 4	Arena: DIVS Sport Hall; Attendance: 4 500; Referees: Vasiliki Tsaroucha (GRE), Tamás Benczúr (HUN), Ventsislav Velikov (BUL)

5 March 2019	Dynamo Kursk (Russia)	89–53 (Series: 1–0)	(Poland) CCC Polkowice	Kursk
19:00 (UTC+3)	Scoring by quarter: 20–11, 17–14, 29–9, 23–19
	Pts: Stewart 21; Rebs: Howard 11; Asts: Xargay 8	Boxscore	Pts: Thomas 18; Rebs: Fagbenle 9 Asts: Thomas 6	Arena: Sport Concert Complex; Attendance: 1500; Referees: Jasmina Juras (SRB), Ivana Ivanović (SRB), Petar Denkovski (MKD)

5 March 2019	Sopron Basket (Hungary)	66–65 (Series: 1–0)	(France) Tango Bourges Basket	Sopron
18:00 (UTC+1)	Scoring by quarter: 25–23, 15–17, 14–11, 12–14
	Pts: Turner 22; Rebs: Casas, Dupree 6 Asts: Dupree 5	Boxscore	Pts: Johannès 24; Rebs: Ouviña, Raincock-Ekunwe 6 Asts: Johannès, Michel 3	Arena: Aréna Sopron; Attendance: 1500; Referees: Özlem Yalman (TUR), Goran Sljivic (AUT), Bojan Jovanić (BIH)

5 March 2019	ZVVZ USK Praha (Czech Republic)	76–54 (Series: 1–0)	(Turkey) Fenerbahçe	Prague
19:00 (UTC+1)	Scoring by quarter: 24–14, 17–13, 23–9, 12–18
	Pts: Elhotová 15; Rebs: Harrison 13; Asts: Thomas 6	Boxscore	Pts: Hartley 15; Rebs: Verameyenka 9 Asts: three players 2	Arena: Královka Arena; Attendance: 1562; Referees: Aleksandar Milojević (MKD), Mila Čavara (BIH), Christoph Rohacky (AUT)

=== Second leg ===
8 March 2019	Fenerbahçe (Turkey)	65–77 (Series: 0–2)	(Czech Republic) ZVVZ USK Praha	Istanbul
19:30 (UTC+3)	Scoring by quarter: 12–27, 23–21, 13–20, 17–9
	Pts: Plum 17; Rebs: Stokes 12; Asts: Vardarlı 4	Boxscore	Pts: Ayayi 25; Rebs: Thomas 10; Asts: Thomas 8	Arena: Metro Energy Sports Hall; Attendance: 478; Referees: Zoran Mitrovski (MKD), Sergiy Chaykovsky (UKR), Vladimir Tsekov (BUL)

8 March 2019	TTT Riga (Latvia)	55–77 (Series: 0–2)	(Russia) UMMC Ekaterinburg	Riga
19:00 (UTC+2)	Scoring by quarter: 9–20, 19–23, 19–20, 8–14
	Pts: Baško 13; Rebs: Vītola 8 Asts: Peddy 5	Boxscore	Pts: Meesseman 27; Rebs: Torrens 16; Asts: Vandersloot 9	Arena: Olympic Sports Centre; Attendance: 850; Referees: Marek Maliszewski (POL), Zdravko Rutešić (MNE), Svetlana Stoyona (BUL)

8 March 2019	CCC Polkowice (Poland)	77–81 (Series: 0–2)	(Russia) Dynamo Kursk	Polkowice
19:00 (UTC+1)	Scoring by quarter: 18–6, 21–27, 21–23, 17–25
	Pts: Thomas 24; Rebs: Fagbenle 8 Asts: Thomas 5	Boxscore	Pts: Stewart 28; Rebs: Stewart 9 Asts: Prince 4	Arena: City Sports Hall; Attendance: 700; Referees: Ciprian Stoica (ROM), Jelena Tomić (CRO), Blaž Zupančič (SLO)

9 March 2019	Tango Bourges Basket (France)	64–74 (Series: 0–2)	(Hungary) Sopron Basket	Bourges
20:00 (UTC+1)	Scoring by quarter: 18–19, 11–15, 16–17, 19–23
	Pts: Ouviña 12; Rebs: Raincock-Ekunwe 7 Asts: Raincock-Ekunwe 5	Boxscore	Pts: Jovanović 18; Rebs: Crvendakić 11; Asts: Casas 9	Arena: Palais des sports du Prado; Attendance: 4 480; Referees: Vilius Mačiulaitis (LTU), Andrada Csender (ROM), Paulo Marques (POR)

== Final four ==
=== Bracket ===
Semifinals
12 April
(Russia) UMMC Ekaterinburg	81
(Hungary) Sopron Basket	59
12 April
(Czech Republic) ZVVZ USK Praha	67
(Russia) Dynamo Kursk	84

Final
14 April
(Russia) UMMC Ekaterinburg	91
(Russia) Dynamo Kursk	67
Third place
14 April
(Hungary) Sopron Basket	53
(Czech Republic) ZVVZ USK Praha	64

=== Semifinals ===
12 April 2019	ZVVZ USK Praha (Czech Republic)	67–84	(Russia) Dynamo Kursk	Sopron
17:00 (UTC+2)	Scoring by quarter: 17–19, 21–24, 9–24, 20–17
	Pts: Ayayi 18; Rebs: three players 9 Asts: Ayayi, Elhotová 3	Boxscore	Pts: Stewart 32; Rebs: Howard 10; Asts: three players 3	Arena: Aréna Sopron; Referees: Jasmina Juras (SRB), Boris Krejič (SLO), Vasiliki Tsaroucha (GRE)

12 April 2019	UMMC Ekaterinburg (Russia)	81–59	(Hungary) Sopron Basket	Sopron
20:00 (UTC+2)	Scoring by quarter: 17–24, 25–15, 18–7, 21–13
	Pts: Griner 19; Rebs: Griner, Vandersloot 8 Asts: Vandersloot 5	Boxscore	Pts: Turner 15; Rebs: Zahui 8 Asts: Casas 3	Arena: Aréna Sopron; Referees: Gentian Cici (ALB), Özlem Yalman (TUR), Dariusz Zapolski (POL)

=== Third place game ===
14 April 2019	Sopron Basket (Hungary)	53–64	(Czech Republic) ZVVZ USK Praha	Sopron
17:30 (UTC+2)	Scoring by quarter: 15–16, 16–22, 15–10, 7–16
	Pts: Crvendakić, Turner 12; Rebs: Crvendakić 8 Asts: Turner 5	Boxscore	Pts: Ayayi 14; Rebs: Thomas 15; Asts: Ayayi 5	Arena: Aréna Sopron; Referees: Jasmina Juras (SRB), Gentian Cici (ALB), Andrada Csender (ROU)

=== Final ===
14 April 2019	UMMC Ekaterinburg (Russia)	91–67	(Russia) Dynamo Kursk	Sopron
20:30 (UTC+2)	Scoring by quarter: 21–17, 27–16, 24–16, 19–19
	Pts: Vandersloot 18; Rebs: Griner 10; Asts: Vandersloot 7	Boxscore	Pts: Howard 20; Rebs: Howard 5 Asts: Prince 5	Arena: Aréna Sopron; Referees: Özlem Yalman (TUR), Boris Krejič (SLO), Vasiliki Tsaroucha (GRE)

2018–19 EuroLeague Women Champions

UMMC Ekaterinburg
Fifth title

== Awards ==
This year the regular season awards decided by fan vote.

=== EuroLeague MVP ===
- (United States) Breanna Stewart ( (Russia) Dynamo Kursk)

=== EuroLeague Final Four MVP ===
- (United States) Brittney Griner ( (Russia) UMMC Ekaterinburg)

=== Coach of the Year ===
- (Spain) Lucas Mondelo ( (Russia) Dynamo Kursk)

=== Most Entertaining Player of the Year ===
- (France) Marine Johannès ( (France) Bourges Basket)

=== Best Frontcourt Player of the Year ===
- (United States) Breanna Stewart ( (Russia) Dynamo Kursk)

=== Best Wing of the Year ===
- (United States) Haley Peters ( (France) Carolo Basket)

=== Best Guard of the Year ===
- (France) Marine Johannès ( (France) Bourges Basket)

=== Young Player of the Year ===
- (France) Alexia Chartereau ( (France) Bourges Basket)

== Individual leaders ==
Stats includes postseason games and are sorted on average per game.

=== Points per game ===
Rank	Name	Team	Games	Points	PPG
1	(United States) Breanna Stewart	(Russia) Dynamo Kursk	18	378	21.0
2	(United States) Haley Peters	(France) Flammes Carolo Basket	14	246	17.6
3	(United States) Alyssa Thomas	(Czech Republic) ZVVZ USK Praha	18	305	16.9
4	(United States) Kelsey Plum	(Turkey) Fenerbahçe Istanbul	16	256	16.0
5	(Hungary) Allie Quigley	(Italy) Famila Schio	10	157	15.7

=== Rebounds per game ===
Rank	Name	Team	Games	Rebounds	RPG
1	(United States) Brionna Jones	(Russia) Nadezhda Orenburg	16	175	10.9
2	(United States) Alyssa Thomas	(Czech Republic) ZVVZ USK Praha	18	188	10.4
3	(United States) Celeste Trahan-Davis	(Belgium) Castors Braine	13	133	10.2
4	(United States) Courtney Paris	(Turkey) Hatay BB	9	90	10.0
5	(United States) Lykendra Johnson	(Greece) Olympiacos	16	154	9.6

=== Assists per game ===
Rank	Name	Team	Games	Assists	APG
1	(France) Amel Bouderra	(France) Flammes Carolo Basket	14	96	6.9
2	(Spain) Sandra Ygueravide	(Russia) Nadezhda Orenburg	15	93	6.2
2	(Italy) Francesca Dotto	(Italy) Famila Schio	11	68	6.2
4	(Spain) Silvia Dominguez	(Spain) Perfumerías Avenida	14	83	5.9
5	(Hungary) Courtney Vandersloot	(Russia) UMMC Ekaterinburg	18	105	5.8

=== Other statistics ===
Category	Player	Team	Games	Average
Steals	(United States) Alyssa Thomas	(Czech Republic) ZVVZ USK Praha	18	2.8
Blocks	(United States) Brittney Griner	(Russia) UMMC Ekaterinburg	17	2.1
Turnovers	(Spain) Sandra Ygueravide	(Russia) Nadezhda Orenburg	15	4.1
Fouls committed	(United States) Lynetta Kizer	(Poland) CCC Polkowice	9	3.3
Minutes	(Hungary) Yvonne Turner	(Hungary) Sopron Basket	18	36:06
FG%	(United States) Courtney Paris	(Turkey) Hatay BB	9	58.5%
2P%	(Canada) Nayo Raincock-Ekunwe	(France) Tango Bourges Basket	9	67.8%
3P%	(United States) Kaleena Mosqueda-Lewis	(France) Flammes Carolo Basket	13	54.1%
FT%	(United States) Kelsey Plum	(Turkey) Fenerbahçe Istanbul	16	93.2%
Efficiency	(United States) Alyssa Thomas	(Czech Republic) ZVVZ USK Praha	18	22.7

=== Individual game highs ===
Category	Player	Team	Statistic
Points	(United States) Breanna Stewart	(Russia) Dynamo Kursk	33
Offensive Rebounds	(United States) Natasha Howard	(Russia) Dynamo Kursk	9
Total Rebounds	(United States) Alyssa Thomas	(Czech Republic) ZVVZ USK Praha	17
Total Rebounds	(United States) Celeste Trahan-Davis	(Belgium) Castors Braine	17
Assists	(France) Amel Bouderra	(France) Flammes Carolo Basket	14
Blocks	(Canada) Ruth Hamblin	(Belgium) Castors Braine	6
Three pointers made	(United States) Kaleena Mosqueda-Lewis	(France) Flammes Carolo Basket	7
Three pointers made	(United Kingdom) Karlie Samuelson	(Belgium) Castors Braine	7
Free throws made	(Greece) Styliani Kaltsidou	(Poland) CCC Polkowice	10
Free throws made	(United States) Kelsey Plum	(Turkey) Fenerbahçe Istanbul	10
Efficiency	(United States) Tina Charles	(Russia) Dynamo Kursk	41.0

== Team leaders ==
Stats includes postseason games and are sorted on average per game.

Category	Team	Average
Points	(Russia) UMMC Ekaterinburg	82.3
Rebounds	(Russia) UMMC Ekaterinburg	43.9
Assists	(Russia) UMMC Ekaterinburg	22.6
Steals	(France) ESBVA-LM	9.6
Blocks	(Russia) Dynamo Kursk	4.0
Turnovers	(France) ESBVA-LM	16.1
2-PT %	(Russia) UMMC Ekaterinburg	52.2%
3-PT %	(France) Flammes Carolo Basket	39.5%
FT %	(Turkey) Fenerbahçe Istanbul	79.5%
Fouls	(Belgium) Castors Braine	20.2
