= 2018–19 EuroCup Women =

EuroCup Women
- Season: 2018–19
- Dates: 8 October 2018 – 10 April 2019
- Teams: 40+4 (competition proper); 44+4 (total)

Finals
- Champions: (Russia) Nadezhda Orenburg
- Runners-up: (France) Lattes Montpellier

The 2018–19 EuroCup Women was the seventeenth edition of FIBA Europe's second-tier international competition for women's basketball clubs under such name.

== Teams ==
Teams were confirmed by FIBA Europe on 29 June 2018.

Quarterfinals
(Russia) Nadezhda Orenburg (EL RS)	(Italy) Famila Schio (EL RS)	(Spain) Perfumerías Avenida (EL RS)	(France) Flammes Carolo Basket (EL RS)
Regular season
Conference 1		Conference 2	
(Russia) Enisey Krasnoyarsk (4th)	(Poland) Artego Bydgoszcz (1st)	(France) Basket Landes (4th)	(Czech Republic) Valosun KP Brno (3rd)
(Russia) PBC MBA Moscow (5th)	(Poland) Wisła Can-Pack Kraków (2nd)	(France) ASVEL Féminin (5th)	(Spain) Spar CityLift Girona (2nd)
(Russia) Spartak M.R. Vidnoje (6th)	(Poland) Energa Toruń (4th)	(France) Tarbes GB (6th)	(Slovakia) MBK Ružomberok (3rd)
(Russia) Inventa Kursk (8th)	(Poland) AZS PWSZ Gorzów (7th)	(France) Lattes Montpellier (7th)	(Belgium) BBC Sint-Katelijne-Waver (3rd)
(Turkey) Botaş SK (4th)	(Sweden) A3 Basket (2nd)	(Hungary) KSC Szekszárd (1st)	(Germany) Stars Keltern (1st)
(Turkey) Çukurova Basketbol (5th)	(Sweden) Södertälje BBK (4th)	(Hungary) Uni Győr (3rd)	(Portugal) Clube Uniao Sportiva (1st)
(Turkey) Beşiktaş (6th)	(Romania) ACS Sepsi SIC (1st)	(Hungary) VBW CEKK Cegléd (5th)	(Switzerland) Elfic Fribourg Basket (1st)
(Turkey) Mersin BŞB (7th)	(Bulgaria) Beroe (2nd)	(Hungary) Aluinvent DVTK Miskolc (6th)	(Slovenia) ZKK Cinkarna Celje (1st)
(Turkey) Galatasaray (8th)	(Belarus) Tsmoki-Minsk (1st)	(Czech Republic) Basketball Nymburk (2nd)	(Italy) Reyer Venezia (2nd)
Qualification round
Conference 1		Conference 2	
(Turkey) Orman Gençlik (9th)	(Russia) Spartak Noginsk (11th)	(France) Nantes Rezé (8th)	(Spain) Lointek Gernika Bizkaia (5th)
(Poland) Basket 90 Gdynia (8th)	(Greece) Niki Lefkadas (5th)	(Belgium) Basket Namur Capitale (4th)	(Belgium) Liège Panthers (7th)

== Schedule ==
Phase	Round	Round date
Qualifying round	First leg	8–10 October 2018
Qualifying round	Second leg	11–17 October 2018
Regular season	Matchday 1	24–25 October 2018
Regular season	Matchday 2	30 October – 1 November 2018
Regular season	Matchday 3	7– 8 November 2018
Regular season	Matchday 4	28–29 November 2018
Regular season	Matchday 5	5–6 December 2018
Regular season	Matchday 6	12–13 December 2018
Play-off Round 1	First leg	3 January 2019
Play-off Round 1	Second leg	9–10 January 2019
Round of 16	First leg	23–24 January 2019
Round of 16	Second leg	30–31 January 2019
Round of 8	First leg	13–14 February 2019
Round of 8	Second leg	20–21 February 2019
Quarterfinals	First leg	6–7 March 2019
Quarterfinals	Second leg	13–14 March 2019
Semifinals	First leg	21 March 2019
Semifinals	Second leg	28 March 2019
Final	First leg	3 April 2019
Final	Second leg	10 April 2019

== Qualification round ==
=== Conference 1 ===
Team 1	Agg.	Team 2	1st leg	2nd leg
Orman Gençlik (Turkey)	141–134	(Poland) Basket 90 Gdynia	67–52	74–82
Niki Lefkadas (Greece)	128–125	(Russia) Spartak Noginsk	66–59	62–66

=== Conference 2 ===
Team 1	Agg.	Team 2	1st leg	2nd leg
Lointek Gernika Bizkaia (Spain)	166–103	(Belgium) Basket Namur Capitale	92–50	74–53
Liège Panthers (Belgium)	116–156	(France) Nantes Rezé	56–75	60–81

== Group stage ==
Draw for the group stage was made on 5 July 2018 in Munich, Germany.

=== Conference 1 ===
==== Group A ====
Pos	Team	Pld	W	L	PF	PA	PD	Pts	Qualification	GOR	BYD	SPA	SOD
1	(Poland) InvestInTheWest ENEA Gorzow	6	5	1	523	428	+95	11	Round of 16	—	81–78	88–76	113–57
2	(Poland) Artego Bydgoszcz	6	4	2	454	371	+83	10	Play-off Round 1	92–74	—	65–66	79–43
3	(Russia) Spartak M.R. Vidnoje	6	3	3	418	417	+1	9	Play-off Round 1	68–83	44–55	—	73–56
4	(Sweden) Södertälje BBK	6	0	6	345	525	−180	6		57–84	63–85	70–91	—

Source: FIBA.com
Legend: Blue = home team win; Red = away team win.
Rules for classification: 1) Points; 2) Head-to-head record; 3) Head-to-head point differential. 4) General point differential 5) Points scored 6) Sum of quotients of points scored and points allowed in each Regular Season game

==== Group B ====
Pos	Team	Pld	W	L	PF	PA	PD	Pts	Qualification	GAL	TOR	MBA	LEF
1	(Turkey) Galatasaray	6	5	1	409	364	+45	11	Play-off Round 1	—	56–50	59–45	81–61
2	(Poland) Energa Toruń	6	4	2	473	375	+98	10	Play-off Round 1	77–55	—	95–86	95–48
3	(Russia) PBC MBA Moscow	6	3	3	459	440	+19	9	Play-off Round 1	67–89	86–82	—	93–59
4	(Greece) Niki Lefkadas	6	0	6	332	494	−162	6		64–69	44–74	56–82	—

Source: FIBA.com
Legend: Blue = home team win; Red = away team win.
Rules for classification: 1) Points; 2) Head-to-head record; 3) Head-to-head point differential. 4) General point differential 5) Points scored 6) Sum of quotients of points scored and points allowed in each Regular Season game

==== Group C ====
Pos	Team	Pld	W	L	PF	PA	PD	Pts	Qualification	KRA	BES	MIN	KUR
1	(Poland) Wisła Can-Pack Kraków	6	5	1	439	387	+52	11	Round of 16	—	78–49	77–69	76–58
2	(Turkey) Beşiktaş	6	3	3	447	415	+32	9	Play-off Round 1	100–71	—	63–68	94–64
3	(Belarus) Tsmoki-Minsk	6	2	4	377	393	−16	8		56–61	66–74	—	72–55
4	(Russia) Inventa Kursk	6	2	4	363	431	−68	8		55–76	68–67	63–46	—

Source: FIBA.com
Legend: Blue = home team win; Red = away team win.
Rules for classification: 1) Points; 2) Head-to-head record; 3) Head-to-head point differential. 4) General point differential 5) Points scored 6) Sum of quotients of points scored and points allowed in each Regular Season game

==== Group D ====
Pos	Team	Pld	W	L	PF	PA	PD	Pts	Qualification	ENI	ORM	MER	SEP
1	(Russia) Enisey Krasnoyarsk	6	4	2	490	436	+54	10	Play-off Round 1	—	84–63	99–84	83–63
2	(Turkey) Orman Gençlik	6	4	2	422	409	+13	10	Play-off Round 1	82–74	—	62–58	76–68
3	(Turkey) Mersin BŞB	6	3	3	448	456	−8	9		90–77	75–70	—	71–61
4	(Romania) ACS Sepsi SIC	6	1	5	383	442	−59	7		54–73	50–69	87–70	—

Source: FIBA.com
Legend: Blue = home team win; Red = away team win.
Rules for classification: 1) Points; 2) Head-to-head record; 3) Head-to-head point differential. 4) General point differential 5) Points scored 6) Sum of quotients of points scored and points allowed in each Regular Season game

==== Group E ====
Pos	Team	Pld	W	L	PF	PA	PD	Pts	Qualification	CUK	BOT	BER	UME
1	(Turkey) Çukurova Basketbol	6	6	0	530	388	+142	12	Round of 16	—	84–63	89–68	84–58
2	(Turkey) Botaş SK	6	4	2	485	431	+54	10	Play-off Round 1	63–85	—	90–79	89–67
3	(Bulgaria) Beroe	6	2	4	425	513	−88	8		82–97	51–98	—	68–67
4	(Sweden) A3 Basket	6	0	6	383	491	−108	6		54–91	65–82	72–77	—

Source: FIBA.com
Legend: Blue = home team win; Red = away team win.
Rules for classification: 1) Points; 2) Head-to-head record; 3) Head-to-head point differential. 4) General point differential 5) Points scored 6) Sum of quotients of points scored and points allowed in each Regular Season game

=== Conference 2 ===
==== Group F ====
Pos	Team	Pld	W	L	PF	PA	PD	Pts	Qualification	GIR	GER	GYO	SPO
1	(Spain) Spar CityLift Girona	6	6	0	459	340	+119	12	Round of 16	—	80–57	78–58	65–51
2	(Spain) Lointek Gernika Bizkaia	6	3	3	393	424	−31	9	Play-off Round 1	47–78	—	79–67	84–66
3	(Hungary) Uni Győr	6	2	4	399	429	−30	8		56–78	79–61	—	78–67
4	(Portugal) Clube Uniao Sportiva	6	1	5	372	433	−61	7		71–80	54–65	66–61	—

Source: FIBA.com
Legend: Blue = home team win; Red = away team win.
Rules for classification: 1) Points; 2) Head-to-head record; 3) Head-to-head point differential. 4) General point differential 5) Points scored 6) Sum of quotients of points scored and points allowed in each Regular Season game

==== Group G ====
Pos	Team	Pld	W	L	PF	PA	PD	Pts	Qualification	MIS	VEN	NAN	BRN
1	(Hungary) Aluinvent DVTK Miskolc	6	5	1	474	425	+49	11	Round of 16	—	63–61	79–56	77–59
2	(Italy) Reyer Venezia	6	3	3	438	380	+58	9	Play-off Round 1	92–75	—	88–60	76–53
3	(France) Nantes Rezé	6	3	3	443	463	−20	9	Play-off Round 1	87–97	63–57	—	93–84
4	(Czech Republic) Valosun KP Brno	6	1	5	390	477	−87	7		70–83	66–64	58–84	—

Source: FIBA.com
Legend: Blue = home team win; Red = away team win.
Rules for classification: 1) Points; 2) Head-to-head record; 3) Head-to-head point differential. 4) General point differential 5) Points scored 6) Sum of quotients of points scored and points allowed in each Regular Season game

==== Group H ====
Pos	Team	Pld	W	L	PF	PA	PD	Pts	Qualification	SZE	RUZ	NYM	CEL
1	(Hungary) KSC Szekszárd	6	5	1	454	375	+79	11	Round of 16	—	87–72	72–65	90–56
2	(Slovakia) MBK Ružomberok	6	3	3	435	430	+5	9	Play-off Round 1	65–58	—	84–76	77–68
3	(Czech Republic) Basketball Nymburk	6	3	3	409	427	−18	9	Play-off Round 1	49–72	71–70	—	65–61
4	(Slovenia) ZKK Cinkarna Celje	6	1	5	391	457	−66	7		68–75	70–67	68–83	—

Source: FIBA.com
Legend: Blue = home team win; Red = away team win.
Rules for classification: 1) Points; 2) Head-to-head record; 3) Head-to-head point differential. 4) General point differential 5) Points scored 6) Sum of quotients of points scored and points allowed in each Regular Season game

==== Group I ====
Pos	Team	Pld	W	L	PF	PA	PD	Pts	Qualification	LAT	ASV	KEL	CEG
1	(France) Lattes Montpellier	6	6	0	512	345	+167	12	Round of 16	—	79–63	83–58	92–50
2	(France) ASVEL Féminin	6	4	2	484	413	+71	10	Play-off Round 1	62–68	—	109–63	76–62
3	(Germany) Stars Keltern	6	2	4	399	525	−126	8		46–94	68–79	—	83–80
4	(Hungary) VBW CEKK Cegléd	6	0	6	411	523	−112	6		66–96	73–95	80–81	—

Updated to match(es) played on update. Source: FIBA.com
Legend: Blue = home team win; Red = away team win.
Rules for classification: 1) Points; 2) Head-to-head record; 3) Head-to-head point differential. 4) General point differential 5) Points scored 6) Sum of quotients of points scored and points allowed in each Regular Season game

==== Group J ====
Pos	Team	Pld	W	L	PF	PA	PD	Pts	Qualification	TAR	LAN	SKW	FRI
1	(France) Tarbes GB	6	6	0	429	372	+57	12	Round of 16	—	71–69	75–58	68–55
2	(France) Basket Landes	6	3	3	453	408	+45	9	Play-off Round 1	73–84	—	80–48	73–59
3	(Belgium) BBC Sint-Katelijne-Waver	6	3	3	382	425	−43	9		51–61	76–73	—	74–68
4	(Switzerland) Elfic Fribourg Basket	6	0	6	386	445	−59	6		66–70	70–85	68–75	—

Source: FIBA.com
Legend: Blue = home team win; Red = away team win.
Rules for classification: 1) Points; 2) Head-to-head record; 3) Head-to-head point differential. 4) General point differential 5) Points scored 6) Sum of quotients of points scored and points allowed in each Regular Season game

=== Ranking of third-placed teams ===
==== Conference 1 ====
Pos	Grp	Team	Pld	W	L	PF	PA	PD	Pts	Qualification
1	B	(Russia) PBC MBA Moscow	6	3	3	459	440	+19	9	Play-off Round 1
2	A	(Russia) Spartak M.R. Vidnoje	6	3	3	418	417	+1	9	Play-off Round 1
3	D	(Turkey) Mersin BŞB	6	3	3	448	456	−8	9	
4	C	(Belarus) Tsmoki-Minsk	6	2	4	377	393	−16	8	
5	E	(Bulgaria) Beroe	6	2	4	425	513	−88	8	

Source: FIBA.com
Rules for classification: 1) Points; 2) Points difference; 3) Points scored.

==== Conference 2 ====
Pos	Grp	Team	Pld	W	L	PF	PA	PD	Pts	Qualification
1	H	(Czech Republic) Basketball Nymburk	6	3	3	409	427	−18	9	Play-off Round 1
2	G	(France) Nantes Rezé	6	3	3	443	463	−20	9	Play-off Round 1
3	J	(Belgium) BBC Sint-Katelijne-Waver	6	3	3	382	425	−43	9	
4	F	(Hungary) Uni Győr	6	2	4	399	429	−30	8	
5	I	(Germany) Stars Keltern	6	2	4	399	525	−126	8	

Source: FIBA.com
Rules for classification: 1) Points; 2) Points difference; 3) Points scored.

=== Seeding ===
Seed	Grp	Team	Pld	W	L	PF	PA	PD	Pts	Qualification
1	I	(France) Lattes Montpellier	6	6	0	512	345	+167	12	Round of 16
2	E	(Turkey) Çukurova Basketbol	6	6	0	530	388	+142	12	Round of 16
3	F	(Spain) Spar CityLift Girona	6	6	0	459	340	+119	12	Round of 16
4	J	(France) Tarbes GB	6	6	0	429	372	+57	12	Round of 16
5	A	(Poland) InvestInTheWest ENEA Gorzow	6	5	1	523	428	+95	11	Round of 16
6	H	(Hungary) KSC Szekszárd	6	5	1	454	375	+79	11	Round of 16
7	C	(Poland) Wisła Can-Pack Kraków	6	5	1	439	387	+52	11	Round of 16
8	G	(Hungary) Aluinvent DVTK Miskolc	6	5	1	474	425	+49	11	Round of 16
9	B	(Turkey) Galatasaray	6	5	1	409	364	+45	11	Play-off Round 1
10	B	(Poland) Energa Toruń	6	4	2	473	375	+98	10	Play-off Round 1
11	A	(Poland) Artego Bydgoszcz	6	4	2	454	371	+83	10	Play-off Round 1
12	I	(France) ASVEL Féminin	6	4	2	484	413	+71	10	Play-off Round 1
13	D	(Russia) Enisey Krasnoyarsk	6	4	2	490	436	+54	10	Play-off Round 1
14	E	(Turkey) Botaş SK	6	4	2	485	431	+54	10	Play-off Round 1
15	D	(Turkey) Orman Gençlik	6	4	2	422	409	+13	10	Play-off Round 1
16	G	(Italy) Reyer Venezia	6	3	3	438	380	+58	9	Play-off Round 1
17	J	(France) Basket Landes	6	3	3	453	408	+45	9	Play-off Round 1
18	C	(Turkey) Beşiktaş	6	3	3	447	415	+32	9	Play-off Round 1
19	B	(Russia) PBC MBA Moscow	6	3	3	459	440	+19	9	Play-off Round 1
20	H	(Slovakia) MBK Ružomberok	6	3	3	435	430	+5	9	Play-off Round 1
21	A	(Russia) Spartak M.R. Vidnoje	6	3	3	418	417	+1	9	Play-off Round 1
22	H	(Czech Republic) Basketball Nymburk	6	3	3	409	427	−18	9	Play-off Round 1
23	G	(France) Nantes Rezé	6	3	3	443	463	−20	9	Play-off Round 1
24	F	(Spain) Lointek Gernika Bizkaia	6	3	3	393	424	−31	9	Play-off Round 1

Source: FIBA.com
Rules for classification: 1) Points; 2) Points difference; 3) Points scored.

== Play-offs ==
=== Bracket ===
Play-off Round 1
24 (Spain) Lointek Gernika Bizkaia	84	58	142
9 (Turkey) Galatasaray	69	76	145
17 (France) Basket Landes	68	58	126
16 (Italy) Reyer Venezia	77	78	155

Round of 16
9 (Turkey) Galatasaray	77	69	146
8 (Hungary) Aluinvent DVTK Miskolc	76	65	141
16 (Italy) Reyer Venezia	83	60	143
1 (France) Lattes Montpellier	64	83	147

Round of 8
9 (Turkey) Galatasaray	50	57	107
1 (France) Lattes Montpellier	64	70	134

Play-off Round 1
23 (France) Nantes Rezé	86	77	163
10 (Poland) Energa Toruń	79	81	160
18 (Turkey) Beşiktaş	83	59	142
15 (Turkey) Orman Gençlik	59	80	139

Round of 16
23 (France) Nantes Rezé	67	56	123
7 (Poland) Wisła Can-Pack Kraków	87	64	151
18 (Turkey) Beşiktaş	65	80	145
2 (Turkey) Çukurova Basketbol	73	83	156

Round of 8
7 (Poland) Wisła Can-Pack Kraków	73	78	151
2 (Turkey) Çukurova Basketbol	93	86	179

Play-off Round 1
22 (Czech Republic) Basketball Nymburk	66	66	132
11 (Poland) Artego Bydgoszcz	72	93	165
19 (Russia) PBC MBA Moscow	77	60	137
14 (Turkey) Botaş SK	76	59	135

Round of 16
11 (Poland) Artego Bydgoszcz	77	60	137
6 (Hungary) KSC Szekszárd	60	86	146
19 (Russia) PBC MBA Moscow	71	63	134
3 (Spain) Spar CityLift Girona	69	73	142

Round of 8
6 (Hungary) KSC Szekszárd	79	73	152
3 (Spain) Spar CityLift Girona	73	80	153

Play-off Round 1
21 (Russia) Spartak M.R. Vidnoje	52	52	104
12 (France) ASVEL Féminin	83	82	165
20 (Slovakia) MBK Ružomberok	80	72	152
13 (Russia) Enisey Krasnoyarsk	74	74	148

Round of 16
12 (France) ASVEL Féminin	90	81	171
5 (Poland) Gorzów Wielkopolski	82	67	149
20 (Slovakia) MBK Ružomberok	68	48	116
4 (France) Tarbes GB	65	62	127

Round of 8
12 (France) ASVEL Féminin	95	65	160
4 (France) Tarbes GB	68	44	112

Quarterfinals
(Italy) Famila Schio	75	81	156
(Turkey) Çukurova Basketbol	79	73	152
(Russia) Nadezhda Orenburg	58	70	128
(Spain) Perfumerías Avenida	50	65	115
(France) ASVEL Féminin	57	54	111
(Spain) Spar CityLift Girona	80	61	141
(France) Flammes Carolo Basket	75	58	133
(France) Lattes Montpellier	91	67	158

Semifinals
(Italy) Famila Schio	61	62	123
(Russia) Nadezhda Orenburg	67	67	134
(Spain) Spar CityLift Girona	66	69	135
(France) Lattes Montpellier	69	98	167

Final
(Russia) Nadezhda Orenburg	71	75	146
(France) Lattes Montpellier	75	57	132

=== Final ===
3 April 2019	Nadezhda Orenburg (Russia)	71–75	(France) Lattes Montpellier	Orenburg
19:00 (UTC+5)	Scoring by quarter: 22–28, 16–14, 18–17, 15–16
	Pts: Jones 19; Rebs: Jones 8 Asts: Wheeler 7 Eff: Jones 21	Boxscore	Pts: Ciak 18; Rebs: Ciak 12; Asts: Dabović 5 Eff: Ciak 30	Arena: Orenburzhje Sport Hall; Referees: Saša Maričić (SRB), Michał Proc (POL), Kristaps Konstantinovs (LAT)

10 April 2019	Lattes Montpellier (France)	57–75 (132–146 agg.)	(Russia) Nadezhda Orenburg	Lattes
20:45 (UTC+2)	Scoring by quarter: 16–18, 11–17, 12–19, 18–21
	Pts: Bankole 15; Rebs: Whitcomb 9 Asts: Bernies 5 Eff: Miyem, Whitcomb 11	Boxscore	Pts: Jones, Wheeler 21; Rebs: Jones, Nicholls 12; Asts: Ygueravide 6 Eff: Jones 28	Arena: Palais des Sports de Lattes; Referees: Janusz Calik (POL), Ivor Matějek (CZE), Jelena Tomić (CRO)

2018–19 EuroCup Women Champions

Nadezhda Orenburg
1st title

== See also ==
- 2018–19 EuroLeague Women
