= Injured reserve list =

Designation used for injured athletes

The injured reserve list (abbr. IR list) is a designation used in North American professional sports leagues for athletes who suffer injuries and become unable to play. The exact name of the list varies by league; it is known as "injured reserve" in the National Football League (NFL) and National Hockey League (NHL), the "injured list" in the Canadian Football League (CFL), the injured list (historically known as the "disabled list") in Major League Baseball (MLB) and Major League Soccer (MLS), and the "PUP List" in World Wrestling Entertainment (WWE). The National Basketball Association (NBA) does not have a direct analog to an injured reserve list, instead using a more general-purpose "inactive list" that does not require a player to be injured.

Injured reserve lists are used because the rules of these leagues allow for only a certain numbers of players on each team's roster. Designating a player as "Injured/Reserve" frees up a roster spot, enabling the team to add a new replacement player during the injured athlete's convalescence. Injured reserve can be for serious injuries or illnesses.

== NHL rules ==
A player may be placed on injured reserve if he is unable to participate due to illness or injury, provided that the player had passed the club's initial physical examination at the start of the season. To qualify for the IR due to injury, that injury must be sufficient (in the opinion of the team's medical staff) to render the player unable to participate for the seven days following that injury. Once placed on IR, the team may then replace the player on their roster. The player on IR may not return to active play for seven days, although they may participate in non-competitive events such as practice, meetings, etc. The NHL also has an LTIR (Long-Term Injured Reserve) list, for long term injuries. The LTIR list requires the player to be out of play for 24 days and 10 games.

== NFL rules ==
A team may place a player on injured reserve (reserve/injured list) who is "not immediately available for participation with a club". Generally, these players may not practice or return to the active roster for the rest of the season (including postseason games or the Pro Bowl) in which they are placed on injured reserve but are allowed to be with the team.

Starting in 2012 the NFL and the NFLPA reached an agreement allowing one player placed on injured reserve to be brought back to the active roster. Provided that the player was on the final 53-man preseason roster (a rule exempted for the 2012 season) and that the injury was deemed to keep this player unable to practice or play football for an estimated six weeks, the player may be allowed to practice after Week 6 and be activated to play after Week 8. In 2017 the rule was changed to allow up to two players to return from injured reserve after Week 8. In 2018 the rule was slightly modified to account for teams' bye weeks: players became eligible to return only after their team had played eight games instead of after eight weeks. In the wake of the COVID-19 pandemic, teams were allowed to re-activate an unlimited number of players after a minimum of three games each. In 2022, a limit of eight players was reintroduced, and the minimum duration increased to four games.

In 2024 teams making the playoffs were granted two additional activations for postseason use only, for a maximum of ten; any activations not used in the regular season can carry over.

Teams may also place a player on injured reserve with a minor injury designation, but the team must release the player once he is healthy.

During the preseason, the league also allows players with long-term, but not season-ending, injuries to be placed into one of three designations: physically unable to perform (PUP) for injuries sustained during the previous season or during offseason training activities (a player who passes their physical at the beginning of training camp and practices is physically able to participate and is thus ineligible for the PUP list), reserve/non-football injury (NFI) for injuries sustained outside of team or league activities (despite the name, this includes lingering injuries from college football play, should an injured player be drafted and join the team), or reserve/non-football illness (NFI) for severe illnesses sustained by players unrelated to football. Players on the PUP list can be moved to the active roster after Week 6 of the regular season or placed on injured reserve. As of 2018, players on the NFI lists can begin practicing after Week 6 but cannot be activated until their team has played eight games. When a player from the NFI list begins practicing, a three-week window starts in which they are eligible to be moved to the active roster. If the player is not activated at the conclusion of the three-week window, they must remain on the NFI list for the rest of the season. During the regular season, players on the PUP list and injured reserve do not count against the league's 53-man roster maximum, but do count against the 90-man roster limit.

== NBA rules ==
Due to abuses in the use of the injured reserve list, where some teams found it convenient to use the IR to stash players without independent medical oversight, the injured reserve has been renamed the Inactive List with the last collective bargaining agreement. Starting in the 2005–06 season, players can enter the inactive list one hour before tip-off for as little as one game. The inactive list has a minimum of one player and a maximum of three, subject to hardship rules when a team with three injured players already on its inactive list has a fourth player injured. Players sent to the NBA G League continues to count on a team's inactive list.

== WNBA rules ==
Unlike the NBA, the WNBA has no injury list as of the 2019 season. This notably affected the Seattle Storm going into that season, when reigning league MVP Breanna Stewart tore her right Achilles in the 2019 EuroLeague Women final. Because of the lack of an injured list, the Storm suspended Stewart without pay to free up a roster spot. (The WNBA would later make Stewart a paid league ambassador during her rehabilitation.)

The league had an injury list when it began play in 1997; players placed on this list were required to sit out at least three games. In 2006, the league changed to an inactive list of up to two players, but it was eliminated after the 2008 season, when rosters were reduced to 11. WNBA rosters now consist of 12 players.

== MLB rules ==
There are five types of injured reserve lists in Major League Baseball.

Up to 7 Games: The Paternity and Bereavement Lists in MLB are designed for family situations. A player on Bereavement List for the health or funeral of another family member may miss 3-7 games, while Paternity List players for birth of a child allows a player up to three games missed.

7 Days: When a player is placed in concussion protocol, players will be assigned to the seven-day IL to prevent long-term brain damage. If a player is not activated by the seventh day, he is moved to the regular IL.

10 Days: Depending on severity and/or recovery time, a position player is placed on the ten-day IL. Position players may attend games and stay with the team, and leave the team for minor league rehabilitation assignments if necessary. The player is removed from the active roster, but not the 40-man roster.

15 Days: Depending on severity and/or recovery time, a pitcher is placed on the 15-day IL. Pitchers may attend games and stay with the team, and leave the team for minor league rehabilitation assignments if necessary. The player is removed from the active roster, but not the 40-man roster.

60 Days: More severe injuries will result in a player being placed on the 60-day IL. The player will not be listed on the 40-man roster, allowing an additional player to be available. A player can not be put on the 60-day IL unless a team's 40-man roster is full.

== Professional wrestling rules ==
Within World Wrestling Entertainment (WWE) and the wider professional wrestling (a form of predetermined sports entertainment) industry, the closest functional analogue to a sports-league injured reserve system is the Physically Unable to Perform (PUP) List. This designation applies to any contracted performer from a professional wrestling promotion's main roster programs or developmental brands. Injuries may occur during televised wrestling matches, on non-televised live events, or during training sessions or other promotional activities. The modern use of a centralized injury-tracking designation within WWE emerged in part after several high-profile disputes in the early 2010s between wrestlers and executives regarding the handling of performer health (notably with CM Punk). Similar lists have been utilized in All Elite Wrestling, Total Nonstop Action Wrestling, New Japan Pro-Wrestling, and various other wrestling promotions. While listed as physically unable to perform, performers may continue to appear in non-wrestling segments, depending on the promotion's storyline needs. If they are not needed for any creative duties, they are removed from the internal roster as not to accidentally schedule them for a show while they are injured. Upon clearance, they are restored to active competition as needed.

== MLS rules ==
In Major League Soccer (MLS), injury-related roster management is governed through two primary mechanisms: the Injured List and the Season-Ending Injury List. These designations are defined within the league’s roster and salary-budget regulations and allow clubs to replace players who are unavailable for extended periods due to injury.

=== Injured List ===
A player may be placed on the Injured List when the club determines that the injury will prevent the player from participating in a minimum of six MLS regular-season matches. While listed, the player is prohibited from competing not only in league matches but also in any official competition during that period, including the U.S. Open Cup, Canadian Championship, Leagues Cup, Campeones Cup, or the CONCACAF Champions Cup. Placement on the Injured List may open a roster spot for the club to sign a replacement, but it does not provide relief from the injured player’s Salary Budget Charge. As a result, the club must independently possess or create sufficient salary-budget space to add a replacement. When an international player is placed on the Injured List, the replacement player may occupy an international roster position.

=== Season-Ending Injury List ===
If a player is deemed medically unavailable for the remainder of the MLS season, the club may place that player on the Season-Ending Injury List. A club may then sign one replacement player under the season-ending injury mechanism. Under this rule, the replacement player’s Salary Budget Charge may not exceed that of the injured player, and if the injured player holds a Designated Player slot, the replacement may also be a Designated Player provided the salary-budget restrictions are met. In contrast to the short-term Injured List, the replacement signed under the season-ending mechanism does not count against the club’s Salary Budget, creating a special exception intended to mitigate the impact of significant long-term injuries. Each club may utilize this mechanism only once during a given league season.

=== Context and characteristics ===
MLS does not employ terminology such as “injured reserve” or “physically unable to perform” that is common in other North American sports leagues. Instead, the Injured List and Season-Ending Injury List function as internal roster-management designations tailored to the league’s salary-budget structure and competitive regulations. These mechanisms do not impose minimum or maximum absence periods beyond the general requirements of the rules, nor do they feature the multiple tiers, activation procedures, or return-designation windows found in systems such as the NFL’s reserve/PUP lists or the NHL’s injured reserve.
