= Russian Women's Basketball Premier League =

Sports league

Women's Premier League
- Sport: Basketball
- Founded: 1992; 34 years ago
- No. of teams: 12
- Country: Russia
- Continent: Europe (FIBA Europe)
- Most recent champions: UMMC Ekaterinburg (19th title)
- Most titles: UMMC Ekaterinburg (19 titles)
- Website: russiabasket.ru

The Russian Women's Basketball Premier League (officially named FONBET Premier League for sponsoring reasons) is the premier women's basketball competition in Russia. The category consists of 11 teams playing a total of 20 rounds. At the end of the regular season the top eight teams play the play-offs throughout April, ending in a 5 matches final.

UMMC Ekaterinburg is the most successful team in the championship with 18 titles, including a record 13-year winning streak. Defunct team CSKA Moscow, later relocated to Samara as VBM-SGAU Samara (9), Dynamo Moscow (4) and Spartak Moscow Region (2) follow in the palmares. Thanks to large number of foreign players, WBPL teams have been successful in the Euroleague since the 2000s, with Spartak Moscow Region winning 4 titles in a row (a competition record since 1976), UMMC Ekaterinburg winning 6 titles, and VBM-SGAU Samara and Dynamo Kursk one each.

== 2024–25 season teams ==
- Dynamo Kursk
- Dynamo Moscow
- Dynamo Novosibirsk
- UMMC Ekaterinburg
- Nadezhda Orenburg
- Sparta and K Vidnoye
- Enisey Krasnoyarsk
- MBA-MGUSiT Moscow
- Nika-Luzales Syktyvkar
- Neftyanik-Titan Omsk
- Samara

== List of winners ==
| Season | Winners | Runners-up | Result |
|---|---|---|---|
| 1992 | CSKA Moscow (1) | Nika (Nizhny Novgorod) | |
| 1992–93 | CSKA Moscow (2) | Dynamo Novosibirsk | |
| 1993–94 | CSKA Moscow (3) | Dynamo Novosibirsk | |
| 1994–95 | CSKA Moscow (4) | Force Majeure (St. Petersburg) | |
| 1995–96 | CSKA Moscow (5) | Dynamo Moscow | |
| 1996–97 | CSKA Moscow (6) | Uralmash Ekaterinburg | |
| 1997–98 | Dynamo Moscow (1) | CSKA Moscow | 163:154 |
| 1998–99 | Dynamo Moscow (2) | Uralmash Ekaterinburg | |
| 1999–00 | Dynamo Moscow (3) | Uralmash Ekaterinburg | |
| 2000–01 | Dynamo Moscow (4) | Uralmash-UMMC Ekaterinburg | 2:1 |
| 2001–02 | UMMC Ekaterinburg (1) | SGAU Samara | 2:0 |
| 2002–03 | UMMC Ekaterinburg (2) | VBM-SGAU Samara | 2:1 |
| 2003–04 | VBM-SGAU Samara (1) | UMMC Ekaterinburg | 3:0 |
| 2004–05 | VBM-SGAU Samara (2) | Dynamo Moscow | 3:1 |
| 2005–06 | VBM-SGAU Samara (3) | UMMC Ekaterinburg | 3:0 |
| 2006–07 | Spartak Moscow Region (1) | CSKA Moscow | 3:2 |
| 2007–08 | Spartak Moscow Region (2) | CSKA Moscow | 3:1 |
| 2008–09 | UMMC Ekaterinburg (3) | Spartak Moscow Region | 2:1 |
| 2009–10 | UMMC Ekaterinburg (4) | Spartak Moscow Region | 3:0 |
| 2010–11 | UMMC Ekaterinburg (5) | Spartak Moscow Region | 3:0 |
| 2011–12 | UMMC Ekaterinburg (6) | Spartak Moscow Region | 3:0 |
| 2012–13 | UMMC Ekaterinburg (7) | Spartak Moscow Region | 3:0 |
| 2013–14 | UMMC Ekaterinburg (8) | Nadezhda Orenburg | 3:0 |
| 2014–15 | UMMC Ekaterinburg (9) | Nadezhda Orenburg | 3:1 |
| 2015–16 | UMMC Ekaterinburg (10) | Nadezhda Orenburg | 3:0 |
| 2016–17 | UMMC Ekaterinburg (11) | Dynamo Kursk | 3:2 |
| 2017–18 | UMMC Ekaterinburg (12) | Dynamo Kursk | 3:0 |
| 2018–19 | UMMC Ekaterinburg (13) | Dynamo Kursk | 3:0 |
| 2019–20 | UMMC Ekaterinburg (14) | Dynamo Kursk | |
| 2020–21 | UMMC Ekaterinburg (15) | Dynamo Kursk | 3:0 |
| 2021–22 | Dynamo Kursk (1) | UMMC Ekaterinburg | 3:1 |
| 2022–23 | UMMC Ekaterinburg (16) | Dynamo Kursk | 3:0 |
| 2023–24 | UMMC Ekaterinburg (17) | Nika-Luzales Syktyvkar | 3:0 |
| 2024–25 | UMMC Ekaterinburg (18) | Nadezhda Orenburg | 3:0 |
| 2025–26 | UMMC Ekaterinburg (19) | Dynamo Kursk | 3:1 |

== Awards ==
The Russian Gold Basket Awards were the annual basketball awards that were given out by the Russian Basketball Federation (RBF), from 2004, to 2009, with a category for Russian Female Basketball Player of the Year.
