= Maëva Djaldi-Tabdi =

French-Chadian basketball player (born 1998)

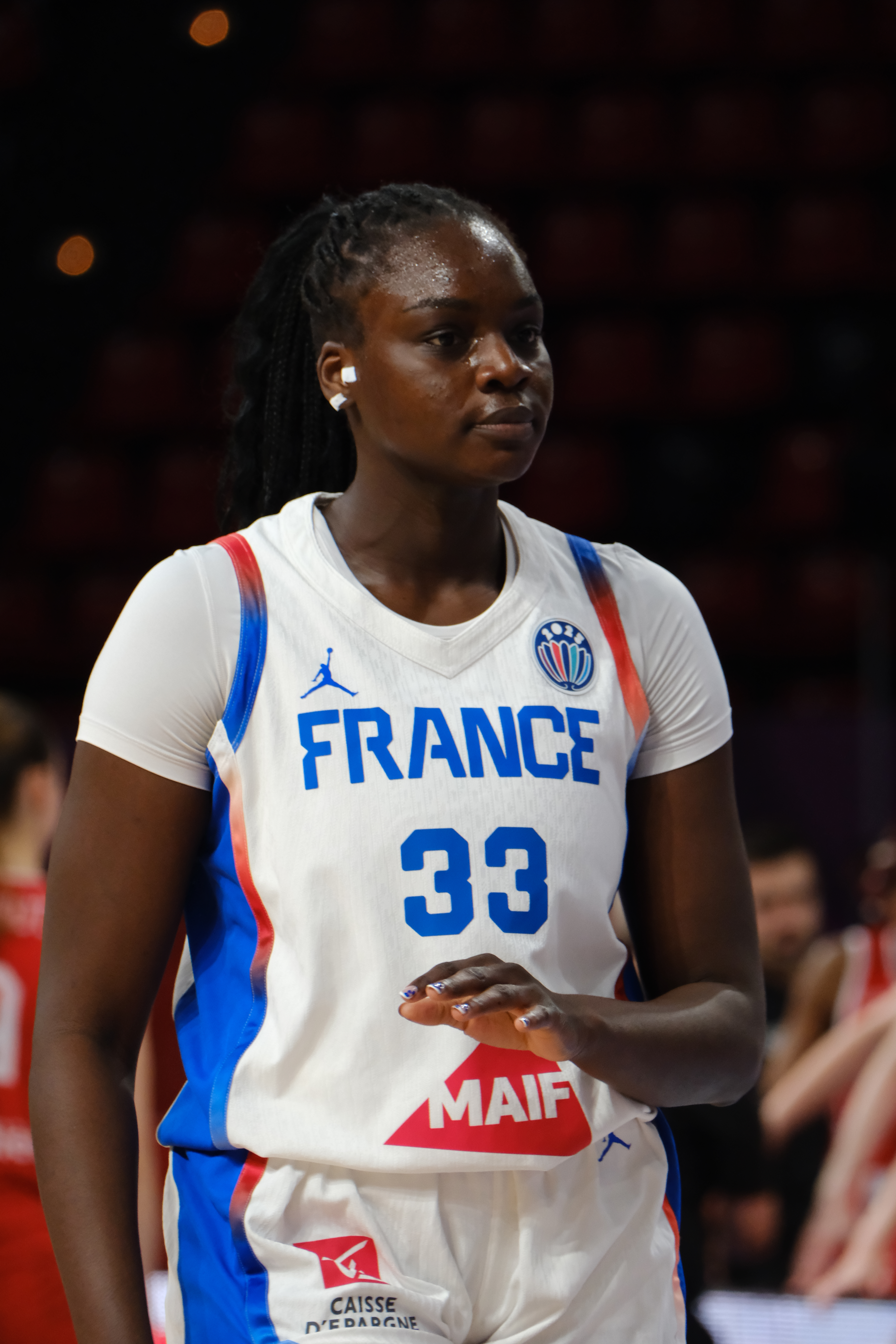

Personal information
- Nationality: Chad; France (since October 15, 2002)
- Born: Gassa Maëva Djaldi-Tabdi; 3 December 1998 (age 27) Cayenne (France)

Sport
- Position: Power Forward, Center

Maëva Djaldi-Tabdi is a Chadian and French basketball player, born on December 3, 1998, in Cayenne (French Guiana).

== Biography ==
Born in France to Chadian parents, she acquired French nationality on October 15, 2002.

Originally from Chécy, she began her training at the Centre-Val de Loire youth centre, where she stayed for a year, before joining the Federal Basketball Centre.

During the summer of 2016, she won the U18 European Championship title where she played 7 games, averaging 6.0 points, 7.6 rebounds (10th in the tournament) and 1.6 assists.

Djaldi-Tabdi's sister is Clarince Djaldi-Tabdi who in June 2016, upon graduating from the Federal Center, joined Flammes Carolo as the 10th player on the roster.

In November 2016, she committed to the American university team Syracuse Orange.

== Rankings ==
- SilverSilver medal, 2015 U18 European Championship
- GoldGold medal at the 2016 U18 European Championship
- GoldGold medal in 3x3 at the 2019 World Beach Game
