= 2017–18 WPBL season =

Russian Women's Basketball Premier League
- League: Russian Women's Basketball Premier League
- Season: 2017–18
- Duration: 29 September 2017 – 25 March 2018 (Regular season); 1 April – 2 May 2018 (Playoffs)
- Teams: 11

Regular season
- Season MVP: (United States) Brittney Griner (UMMC Ekaterinburg)

Finals
- Champions: UMMC Ekaterinburg (12th title)
- Runners-up: Dynamo Kursk

Statistical leaders
Points	(United States) Brittney Griner	19.5
Rebounds	(United States) Cierra Burdick	9.9
Assists	(United States) Lindsay Allen	5.3

The 2017–18 WPBL season was the 27th season of the Russian Women's Basketball Premier League. UMMC Ekaterinburg were the defending champions.

== Regular season ==
Pos	Team	Pld	W	L	PF	PA	PD	Pts	Qualification
1	UMMC Ekaterinburg	20	19	1	1707	1063	+644	39	Playoffs
2	Dynamo Kursk	20	19	1	1741	1282	+459	39	Playoffs
3	Nadezhda Orenburg	20	14	6	1485	1259	+226	34	Playoffs
4	Enisey Krasnoyarsk	20	10	10	1458	1448	+10	30	Playoffs
5	Sparta & K	20	10	10	1351	1501	−150	30	Playoffs
6	Kazanochka Kazan	20	9	11	1269	1408	−139	29	Playoffs
7	MBA Moscow	20	9	11	1403	1466	−63	29	Playoffs
8	Inventa Kursk	20	7	13	1296	1424	−128	27	Playoffs
9	Dynamo Moscow	20	6	14	1389	1561	−172	26	Placement round
10	Dynamo Novosibirsk	20	6	14	1227	1492	−265	26	Placement round
11	Spartak Noginsk	20	1	19	1199	1621	−422	21	Placement round

Source: RBF

== Placement round ==
Pos	Team	Pld	W	L	PF	PA	PD	Pts
9	Dynamo Novosibirsk	2	2	0	158	141	+17	4
10	Dynamo Moscow	2	1	1	156	137	+19	3
11	Spartak Noginsk	2	0	2	133	169	−36	2

Source: RBF

== Playoffs ==
Quarterfinals
1	UMMC Ekaterinburg	84	87
8	Inventa Kursk	55	61
4	Enisey Krasnoyarsk	75	67	73
5	Sparta & K	70	69	68
2	Dynamo Kursk	96	84
7	MBA Moscow	51	60
3	Nadezhda Orenburg	90	65
6	Kazanochka Kazan	60	59

Semifinals
1	UMMC Ekaterinburg	98	90
4	Enisey Krasnoyarsk	83	47
2	Dynamo Kursk	100	88
3	Nadezhda Orenburg	55	83

Final
1	UMMC Ekaterinburg	74	82	94
2	Dynamo Kursk	64	69	91
Third place
3	Nadezhda Orenburg	109	78	83
4	Enisey Krasnoyarsk	70	65	81

5–8th place semifinals
5	Sparta & K	68	58
8	Inventa Kursk	53	51
6	Kazanochka Kazan	66	85	63
7	MBA Moscow	77	75	71

Fifth place
5	Sparta & K	64	74
7	MBA Moscow	69	78
Seventh place
6	Kazanochka Kazan	73	68	76
8	Inventa Kursk	59	80	81
