= Tiffany Clarke =

American basketball player

Tiffany Wright Clarke is an American-Jamaican basketball player.

Clarke attended Vanderbilt University.

Clarke played for Calais. Clarke later played for AB Chartres.

Clarke later played in Poland for Sunreef Yachts Politechnika Gdańska.

Clarke later played for Angers and La Roche Vendée.

Clarke currently plays for Flammes Carolo Basket.
