= Noémie Brochant =

French basketball player (born 1999)

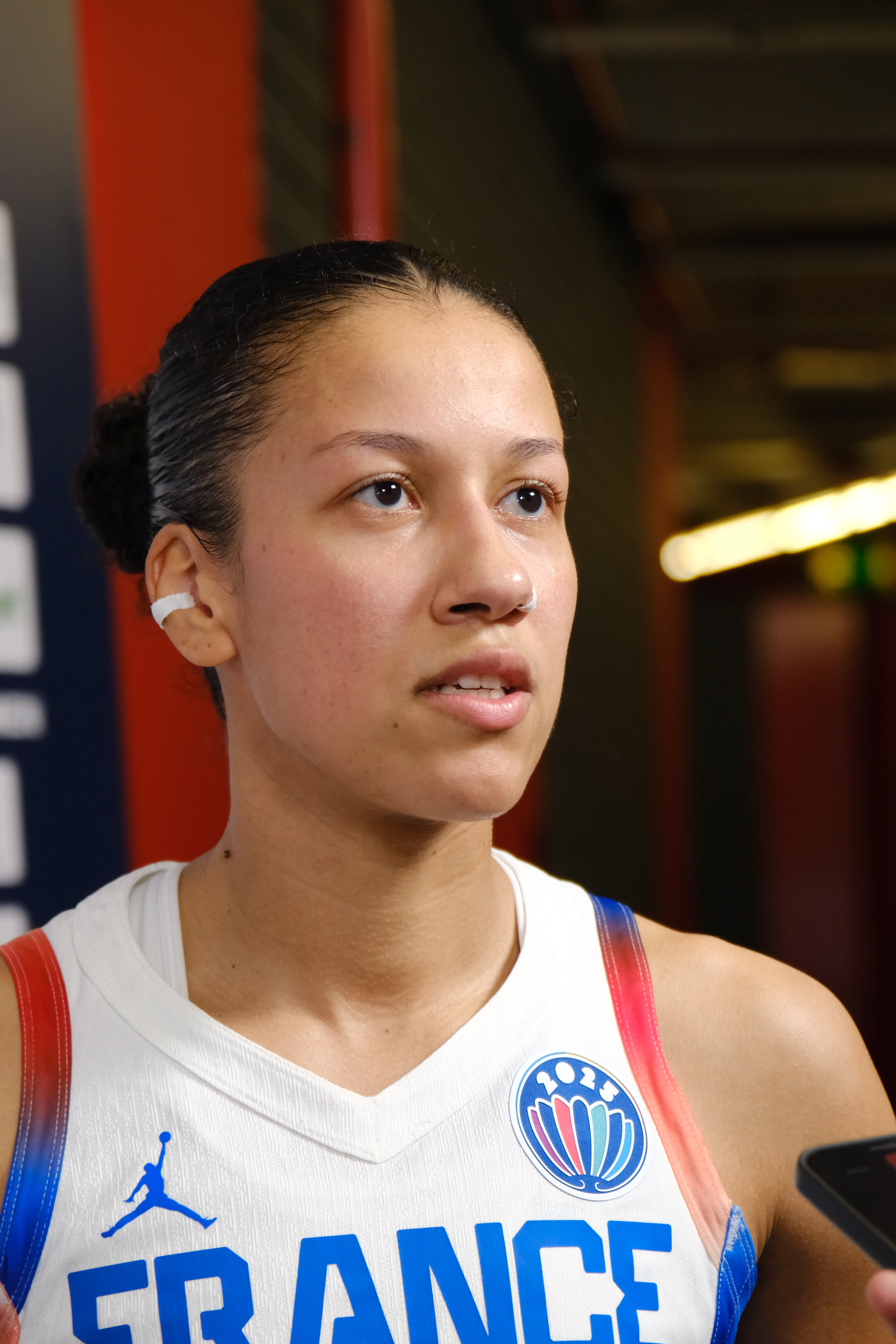
- Brochant in 2025

No. 1 – Phoenix Mercury
- Position: Forward/Guard
- League: WNBA

Personal information
- Born: 25 October 1999 (age 27)
- Listed height: 1.80 m (5 ft 11 in)

Career information
- Playing career: 2023–present

Career history
- 2023–2025: Flammes Carolo Basket
- 2026–present: Phoenix Mercury
- Stats at WNBA.com
- Stats at Basketball Reference

Noémie Brochant (born 25 October 1999) is a French professional basketball player for the Phoenix Mercury of the Women's National Basketball Association (WNBA) and a member of the France women's national basketball team.

== Professional career ==
In June 2023, Brochant signed a three-year contract with Flammes Carolo Basket of the Ligue Féminine de Basketball. She helped the team win the 2025 French Cup. During the 2025–26 Ligue Féminine de Basketball she averaged 11.3 points, 4.2 rebounds, 3.8 assists and 2.0 steals in 23 games. On 13 April 2026, she signed a training camp contract with the Phoenix Mercury of the WNBA. She made the Mercury's opening day roster.

== National team career ==
Brochant made her senior national team debut for France at EuroBasket Women 2025 where she averaged 5.5 points, 0.3 rebounds and 0.7 assists in six games, as France finished in fourth place.
