= Flammes Carolo Basket =

- Leagues: La Boulangère Wonderligue
- Founded: 2002
- Arena: Salle Bayard (capacity: 1,500)
- Location: Charleville-Mezieres, France
- Team colors: Red and Black
- President: (France) Yannick Yernaux
- Head coach: (France) Romuald Yernaux
- Website: https://fan.lesflammes.com/
Home	Away

The Flammes Carolo Basket Ardennes is a French professional women's basketball club from Charleville-Mezieres, that currently plays in the La Boulangère Wonderligue (French's first division for women's basketball).

== Honours ==
- Ligue Feminine 2 de Basketball
  - Winners (1): 2010

== Players ==
=== Current roster ===
Note: Flags indicate national team eligibility at FIBA-sanctioned events. Players may hold other non-FIBA nationalities not displayed.

Flammes Carolo Basket roster
Players
Coaches

Pos.	No.	Nat.	Name	Ht.	Age
SF	1	(France)	Brochant, Noémie	1.80 m (5 ft 11 in)	26 – 25 October 1999
PG	2	(France)	Franchelin, Coline	1.69 m (5 ft 7 in)	26 – 18 August 1999
SG	3	(France)	Bankole, Ornella	1.81 m (5 ft 11 in)	28 – 17 September 1997
PG	4	(France)	Bouderra, Amel	1.63 m (5 ft 4 in)	37 – 26 March 1989
SF	10	(France)	Chevaugeon, Sara	1.75 m (5 ft 9 in)	33 – 12 February 1993
PF	12	(Dominican Republic)	Martinez, Esmery	1.88 m (6 ft 2 in)	26 – 1 May 2000
SF	14	(France)	Akomatsri, Hillary	1.77 m (5 ft 10 in)	20 – 9 April 2006
PF	15	(Austria)	Sagerer, Sarah	1.90 m (6 ft 3 in)	30 – 8 February 1996
C	22	(Nigeria)	Chidom, Oderah	1.93 m (6 ft 4 in)	30 – 9 July 1995
PF/C	34	(United States)	Clarke, Tiffany	1.84 m (6 ft 0 in)	35 – 5 February 1991

Head coach

- (France) Romuald Yernaux

Assistant coach(es)

- (France) Pierre Davenel
- (France) Alexandre Laflamme

Legend

- (C) Team captain
- Injured

- Roster
Updated: 4 November 2024
