= WBC Dynamo Novosibirsk =

Russian basketball team

WBC Dynamo-GUVD Novosibirsk (ЖБК «Динамо-ГУВД» Новосибирск) is a Russian women's basketball club, currently competing in the Russian Women's Basketball Premier League. Founded in 1955 as Burevestnik Novosibirsk, it was transferred into the Dynamo SS in 1966.

The team won the 1985-86 Ronchetti Cup and three Soviet Championships in a row until 1988. Dynamo reached the final of the European Cup in 1987 and 1988, losing both times to AS Vicenza.

Following the collapse of the Soviet Union, Dynamo Novosibirsk was the runner-up of the new Russian League in 1993 and 1994. The team declined in subsequent years, with its best standings being two 3rd spots in 1999 and 2003; in 2011 it finished 7th. Dynamo has appeared three times in the Eurocup, the successor of the Ronchetti Cup.

== Titles ==
- 1 Ronchetti Cup (1986)
- 3 Soviet Leagues (1986, 1987, 1988)

=== Record in European competitions ===
- European Cup / Euroleague
  - 1987: Runner-up
  - 1988: Runner-up
  - 1989: 3rd
- Ronchetti Cup / Eurocup
  - 1986: Champion
  - 2005: FIBA Conference South Semifinals
  - 2011: Quarter-Finals
  - 2012: Group Stage (3/4)
