= Nadezhda Orenburg =

Russian basketball team

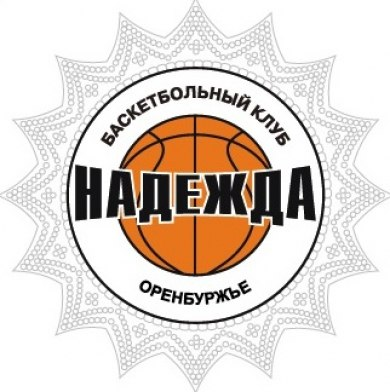
- Leagues: Premier League
- Founded: 1994
- Arena: Orenburzhye Sport Hall
- Location: Orenburg, Russia
- Team colors: White, Golden, Red
- President: Leonid Tsenayed
- Head coach: Momir Tasic
- Website: www.orenbasket.ru

PBK Nadezhda Orenburg (Russian: ПБК «Надежда») is a Russian professional women's basketball club from Orenburg founded in 1994.

Nadezhda has been 3rd in the Russian Premier League in 2010 and 2011, and reached the Russian Cup's final from 2011–12, as well as from 2014-16, everytime losing to UMMC Ekaterinburg. In addition they have been regularly playing in FIBA Europe competitions since 2005, reaching the final of the 2010 Eurocup. Additionally, they played in the Euroleague since 2008, except in the 2009–10 season.

== Winners ==
- EuroLeague:
  - Runners-up: 2015–16
- FIBA Eurocup:
  - Winners: 2018–19
  - Runners-up: 2009–10
- FIBA Europe SuperCup Women
  - Runners-up: 2019
- Russian Championships:
  - Runners-up: 2013–14, 2014–15, 2015–16
  - (bronze) Third place: 2009–10, 2010–11, 2011–12, 2012–13, 2016–17, 2017–18, 2018–19, 2019–20
- Russian Cup:
  - Winners: 2020–21
  - Runners-up: 2010–11, 2011–12, 2013–14

== Roster ==
Nadezhda Orenburg roster
Players
Coaches

| Pos. | No. | Nat. | Name | Ht. | Wt. | Age |
|---|---|---|---|---|---|---|
| G | 5 | (Russia) | Fedorenkova, Ekaterina | 1.78 m (5 ft 10 in) | | 31 – 12 August 1993 |
| G | 6 | (Russia) | Burik, Tatiana | 1.67 m (5 ft 6 in) | | 37 – 8 May 1987 |
| F | 10 | (Russia) | Shilova, Anastasia | 1.88 m (6 ft 2 in) | | 34 – 10 January 1991 |
| G | 22 | (Russia) | Novikova, Olga | 1.79 m (5 ft 10 in) | | 31 – 22 February 1994 |
| C | 32 | (Russia) | Mayga, Zhosselina | 1.96 m (6 ft 5 in) | | 28 – 30 April 1996 |
| F | 91 | (Russia) | Medvedeva, Viktoria | 1.83 m (6 ft 0 in) | | 33 – 25 April 1991 |

Head coach

- Vacant

Assistant coach(es)

- (Russia) Alexander Ermolinsky

Legend

- (C) Team captain
- Injured

- Roster
Updated: 2018-12-06

== Former players ==
- (United States) Kara Braxton
- (United States) Natisha Hiedeman
- (United States) Renee Montgomery
- (United States) Katie Douglas
- (Latvia) Zane Tamane
- (Montenegro) Iva Perovanović
