= Chicago Tribune Silver Basketball =

Annual award by the Chicago Tribune

- Awarded for: the men's and women's basketball MVPs of the Big Ten Conference
- Country: United States
- Presented by: Chicago Tribune

History
- First award: 1946 (men); 1988 (women)
- Final award: 2007

The Chicago Tribune Silver Basketball was an award presented annually by the Chicago Tribune to the men's and women's college basketball most valuable players of the Big Ten Conference each season, as voted upon by the league's coaches and officials. The Chicago Tribune awarded the Silver Basketball for men's basketball beginning in 1946 while the women's award was first presented in 1988. It was considered the pre-eminent Big Ten basketball individual award, eventually being superseded by the present-day men's and women's players of the awards as voted upon by the league's coaches and media. The Silver Basketball was discontinued after the 2006–07 season.

A number of men's and women's honorees were also named the national player of the year (NPOY) by one of the major selectors in the same season of this award. On the men's side, nine unique players represented 10 NPOYs, with Ohio State's Jerry Lucas repeating as back-to-back NPOY in 1961 and 1962. On the women's side, two players were also NPOYs: Carol Ann Shudlick (1994) and Stephanie White (1999).

== Key ==
*	Awarded a national player of the year award that same season: Men – Sporting News; Oscar Robertson Trophy; Associated Press; NABC; UPI; Naismith; Wooden; Adolph Rupp Trophy; Helms Foundation; Women – Wade; Associated Press; Naismith; Wooden
Player (X)	Denotes the number of times the player has been awarded the Chicago Tribune Silver Basketball award at that point

== Winners ==
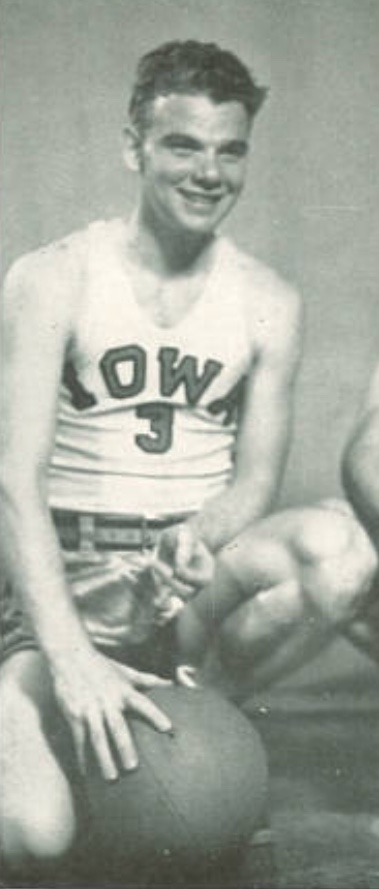
Murray Wier, Iowa, 1948

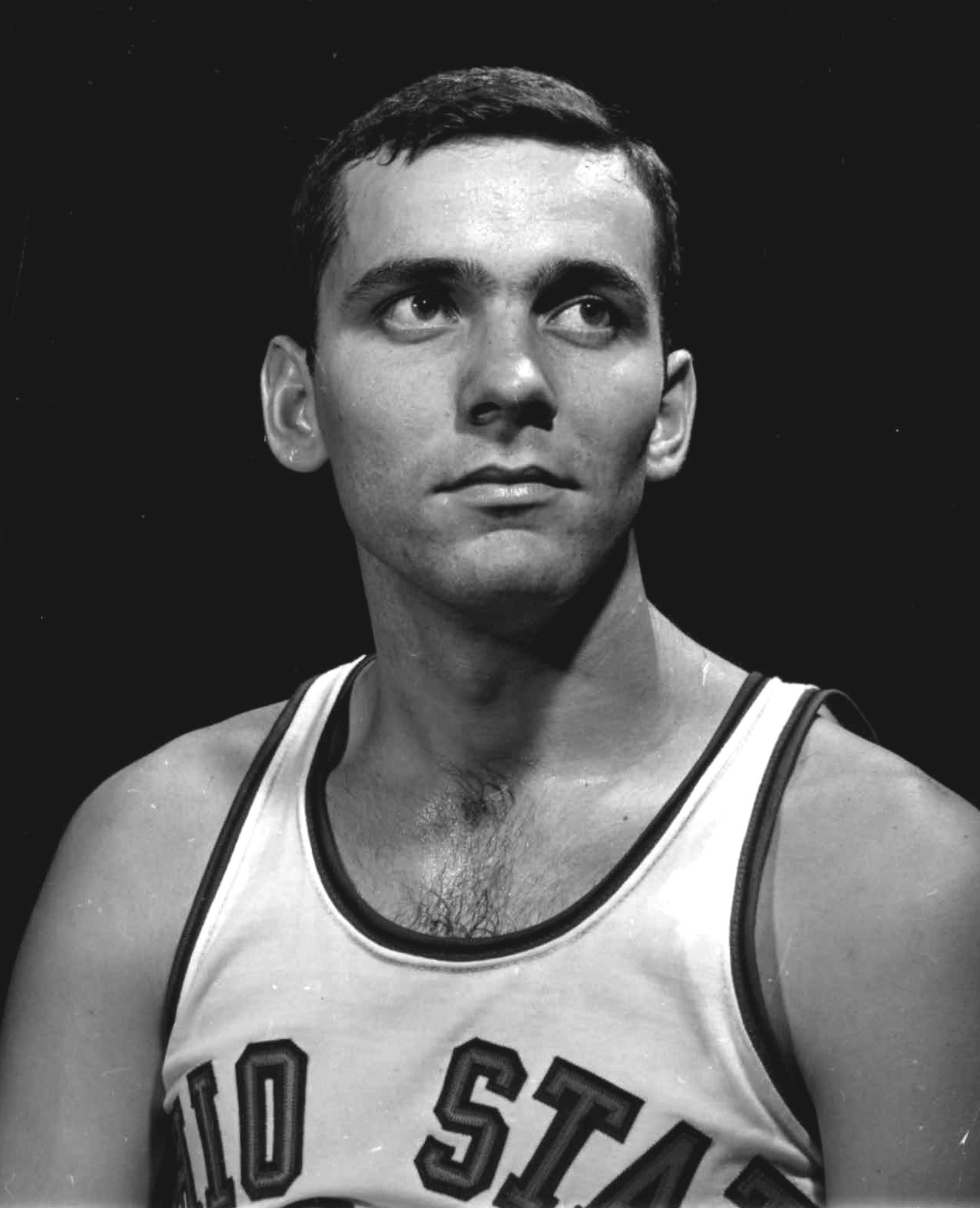
Jerry Lucas, Ohio State, 1960 through 1962

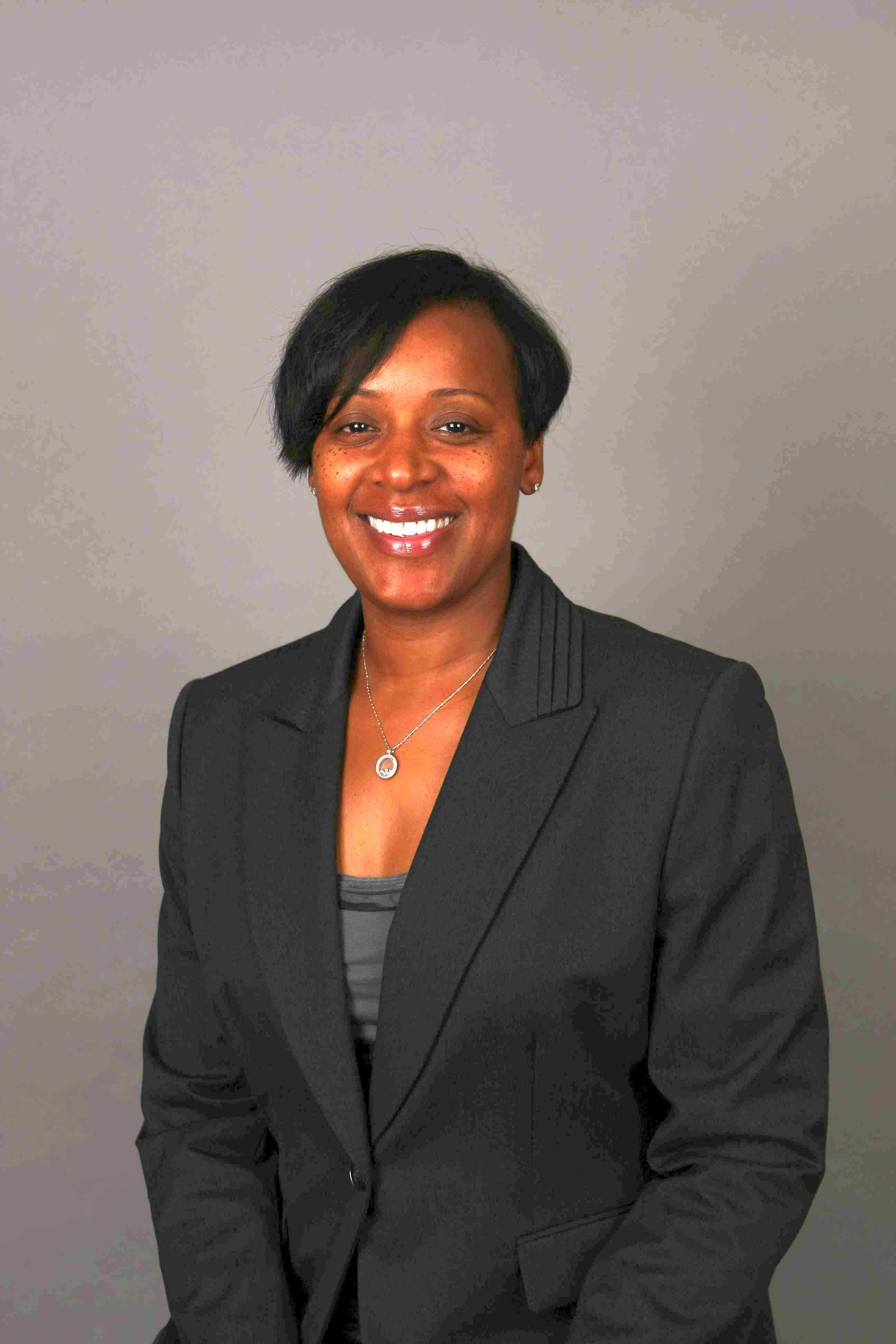
Michelle Edwards, Iowa, 1988

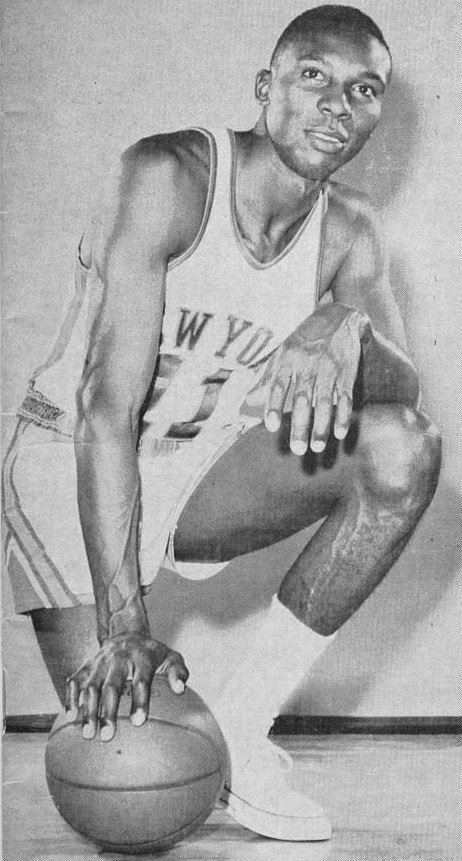
Johnny Green, Michigan State, 1959

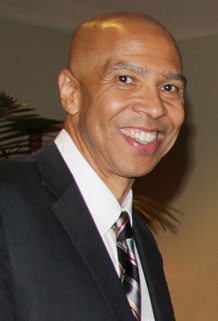
Mychal Thompson, Minnesota, 1978

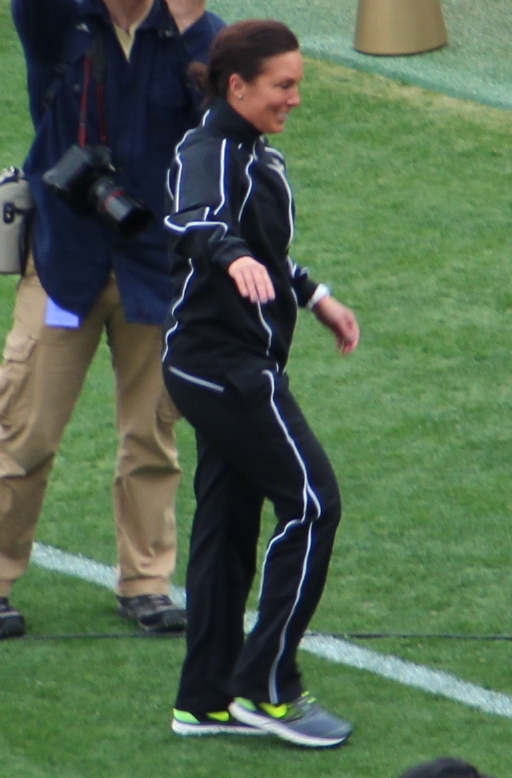
MaChelle Joseph, Purdue, 1992

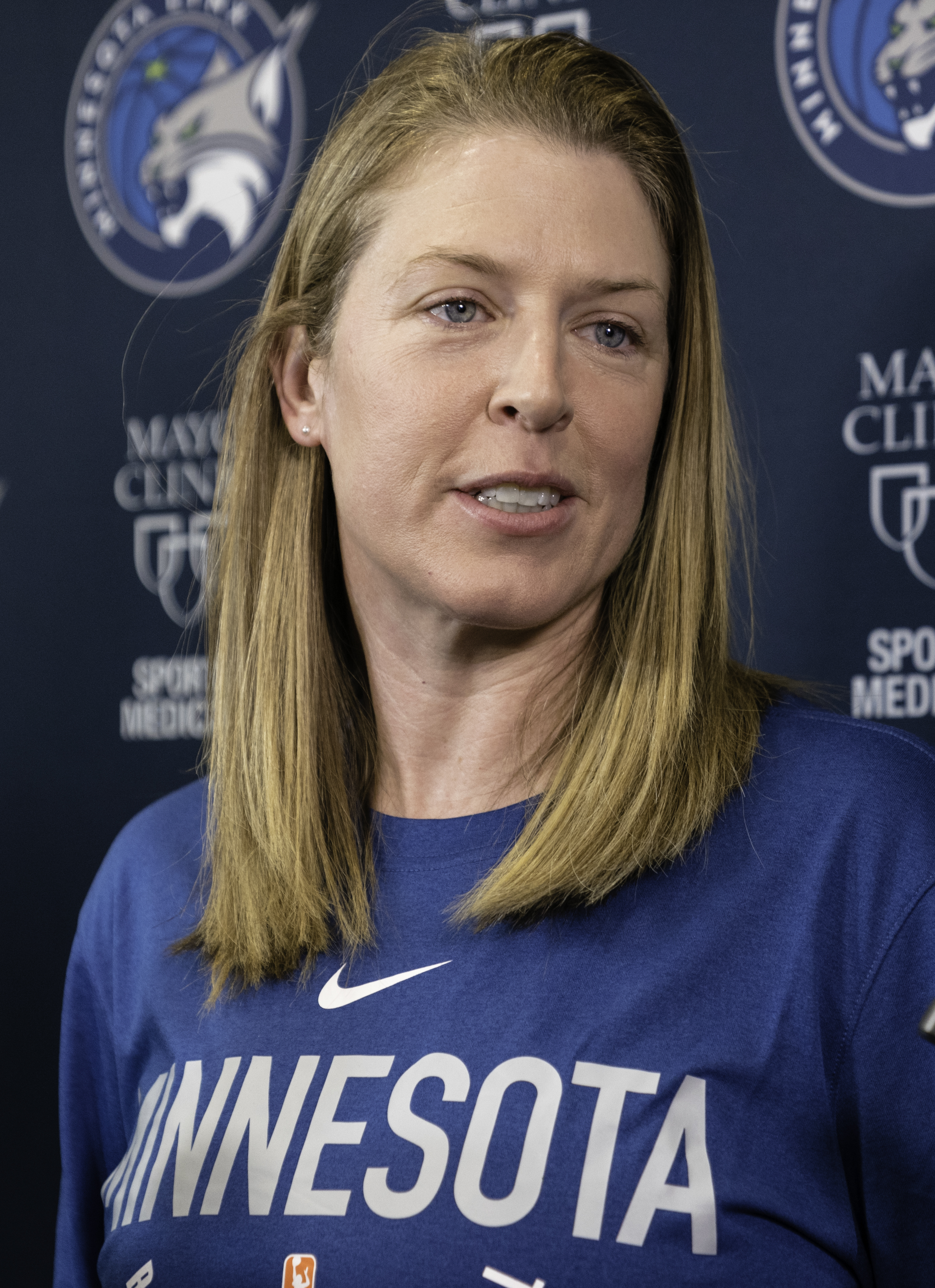
Katie Smith, Ohio State, 1996

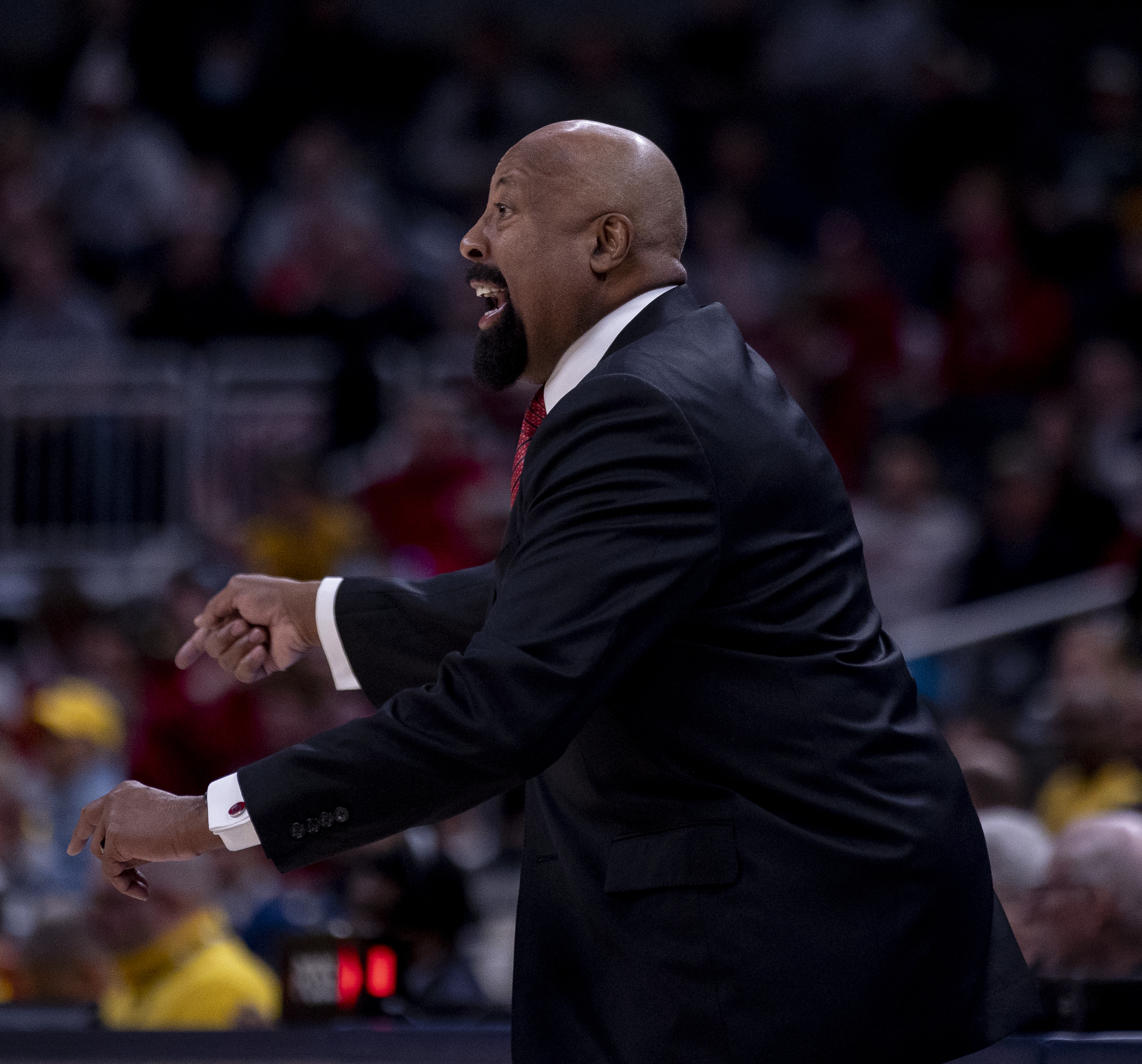
Mike Woodson, Indiana, 1980

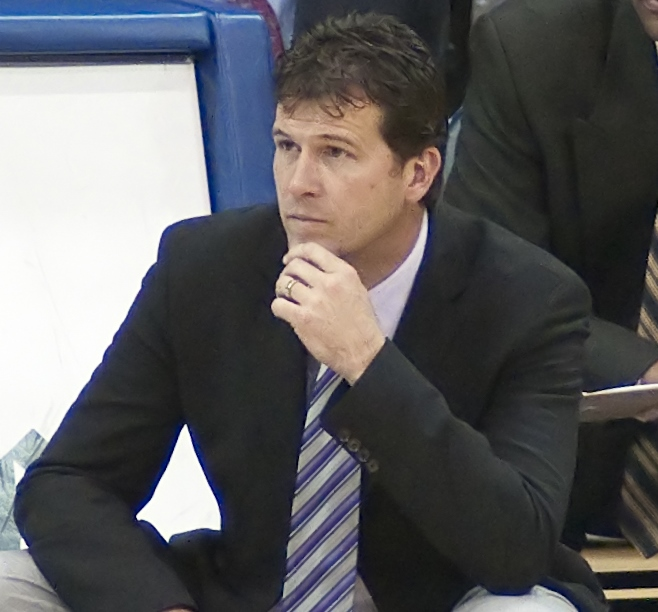
Steve Alford, Indiana, 1987

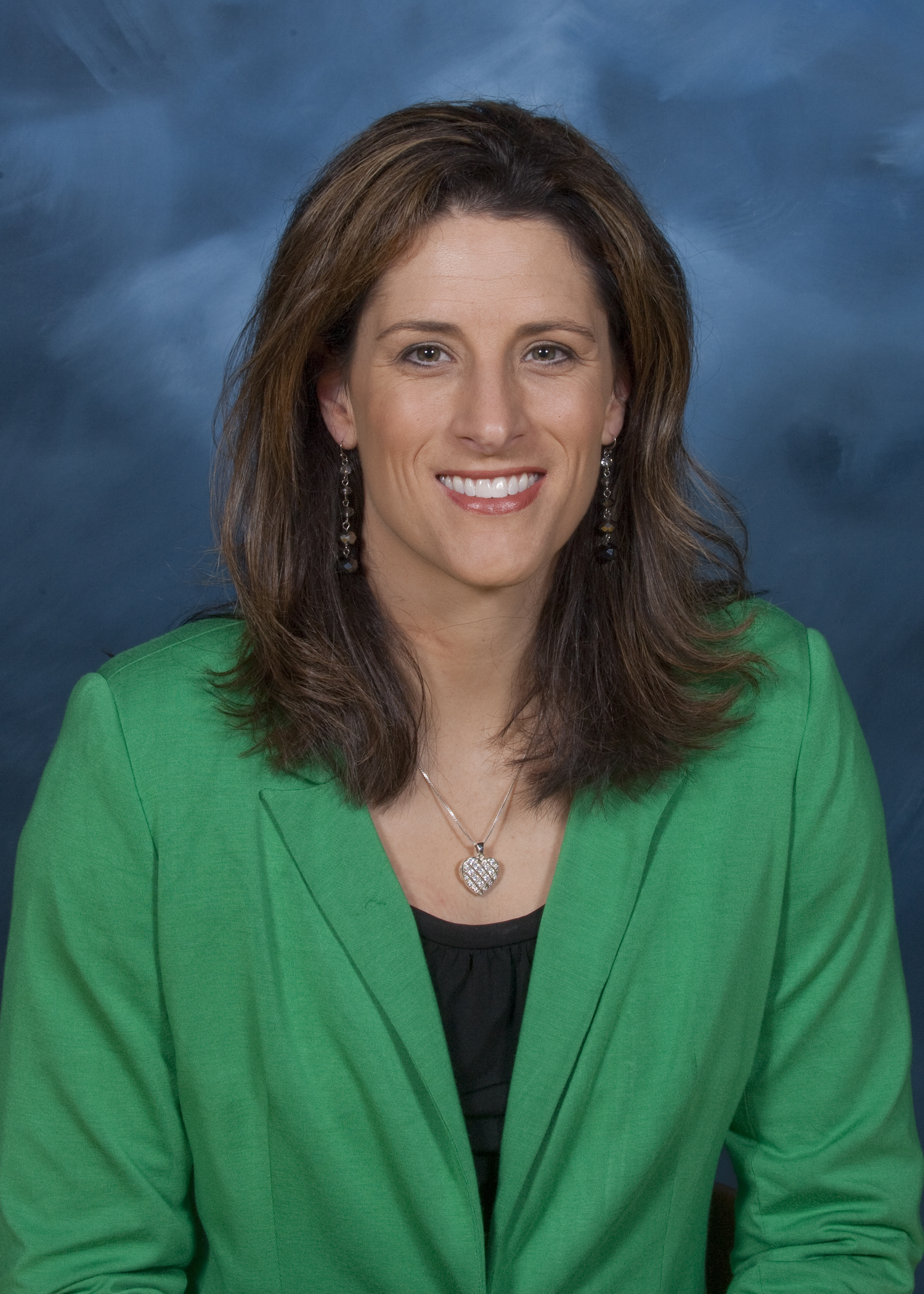
Stephanie White, Purdue, 1999

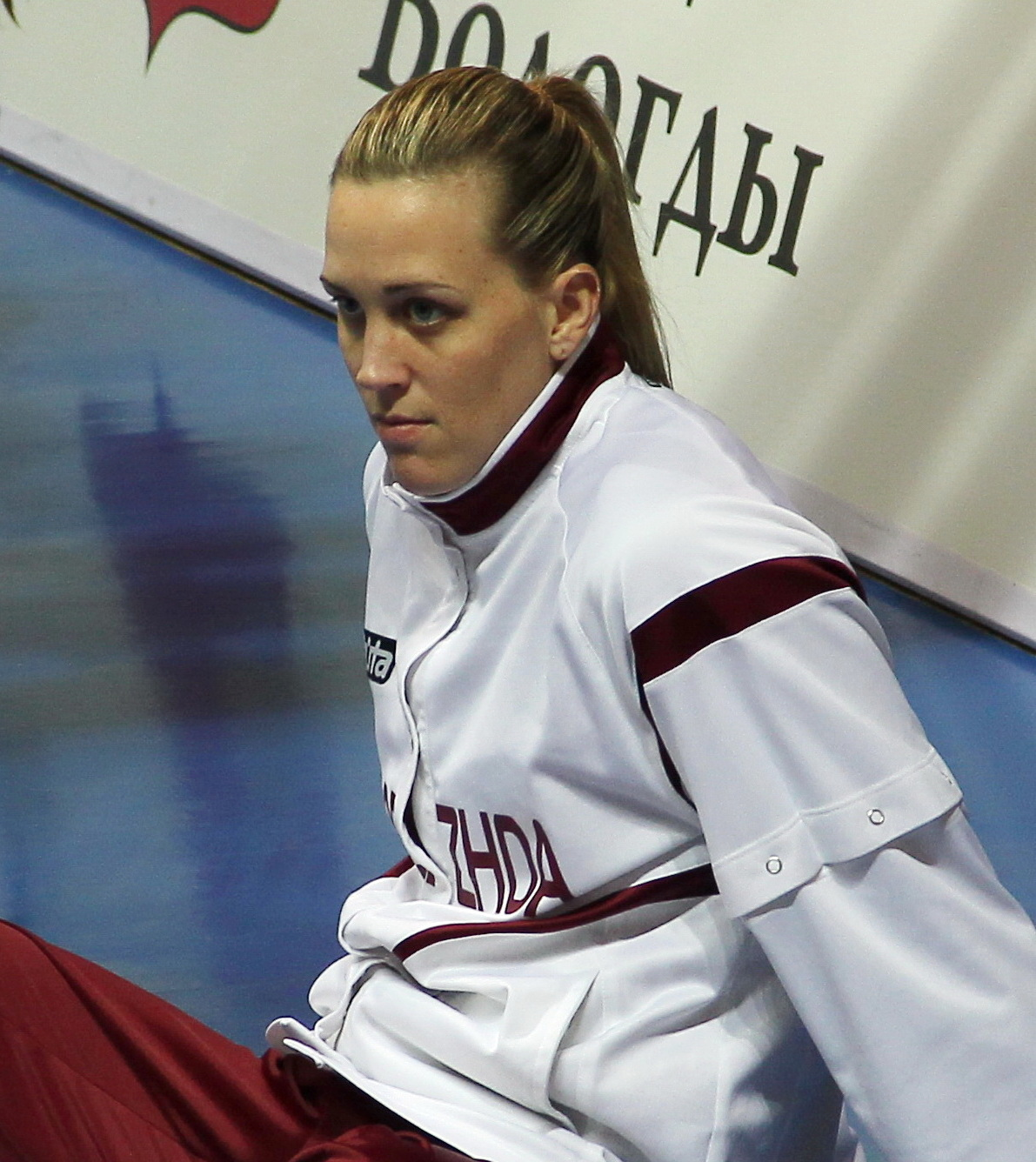
Katie Douglas, Purdue, 2001

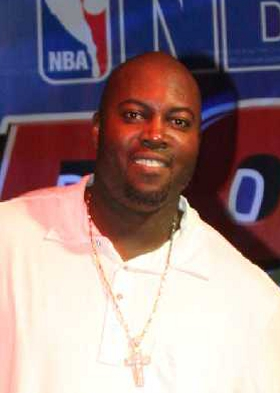
Glen Rice, Michigan, 1989

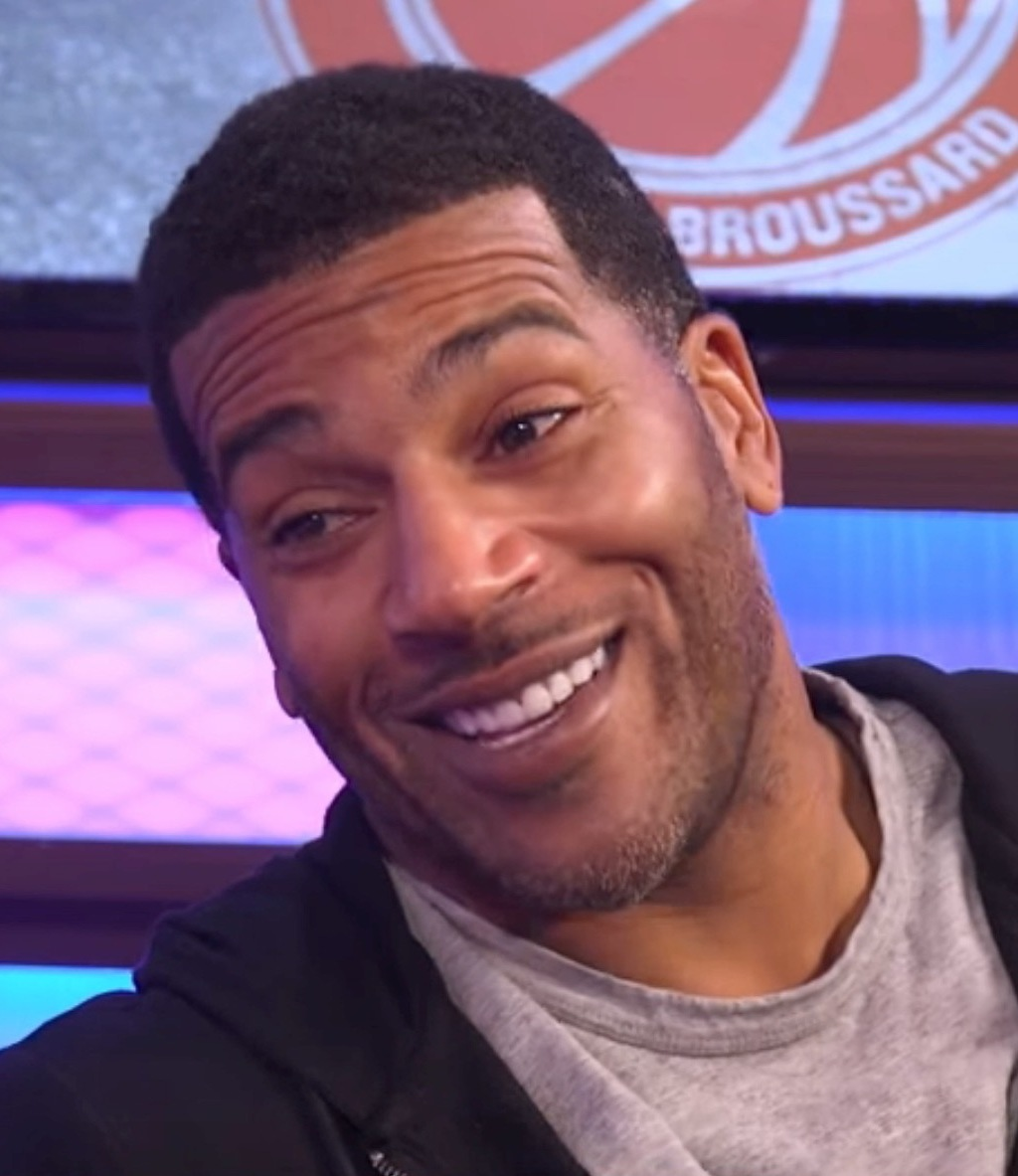
Jim Jackson, Ohio State, 1991 and 1992

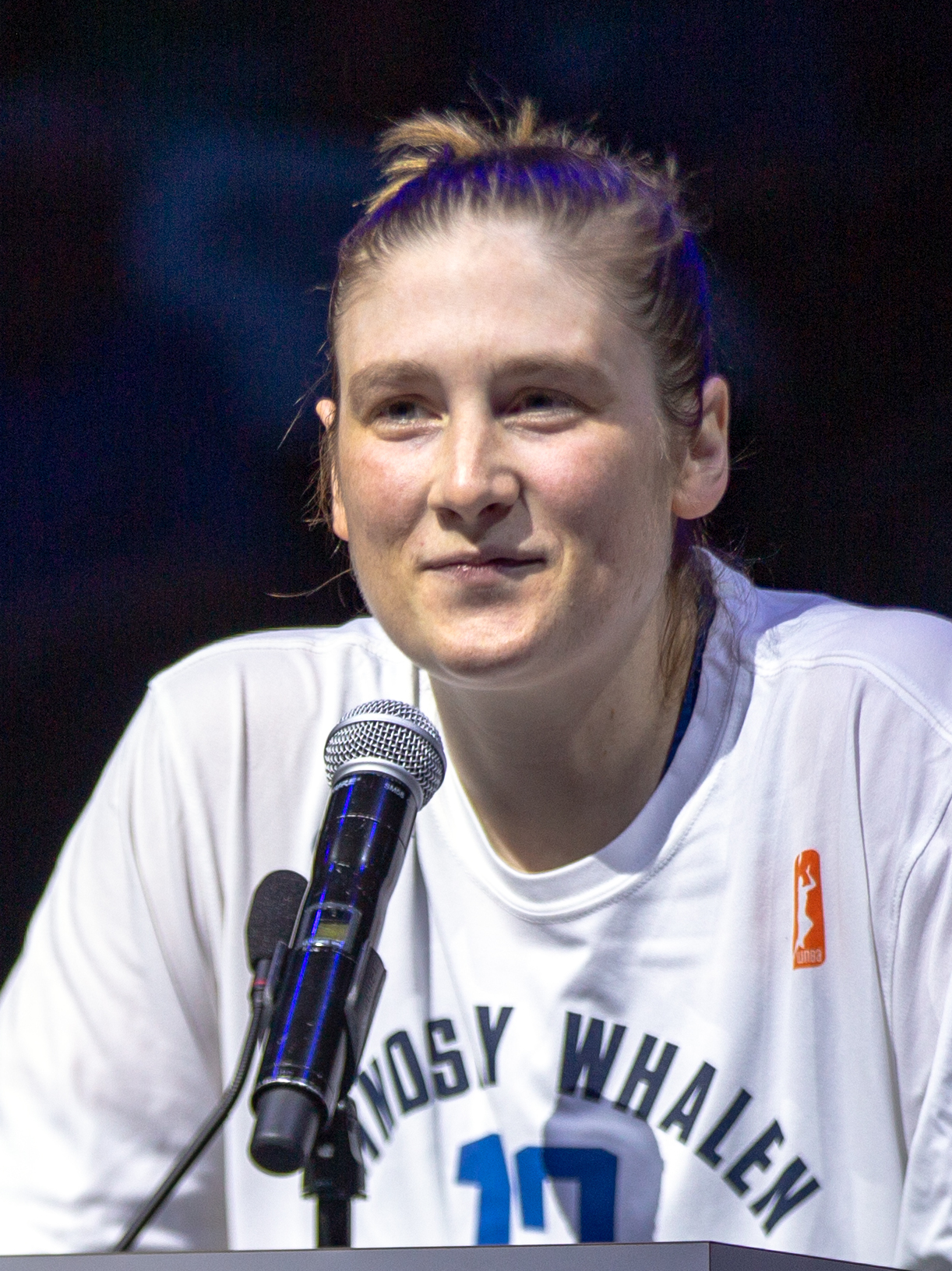
Lindsay Whalen, Minnesota, 2002

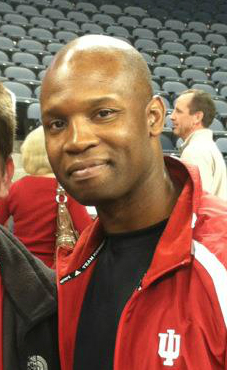
Calbert Cheaney, Indiana, 1993

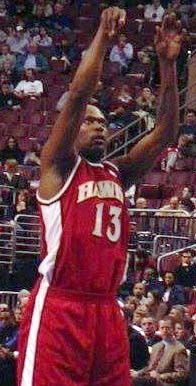
Glenn Robinson, Purdue, 1994

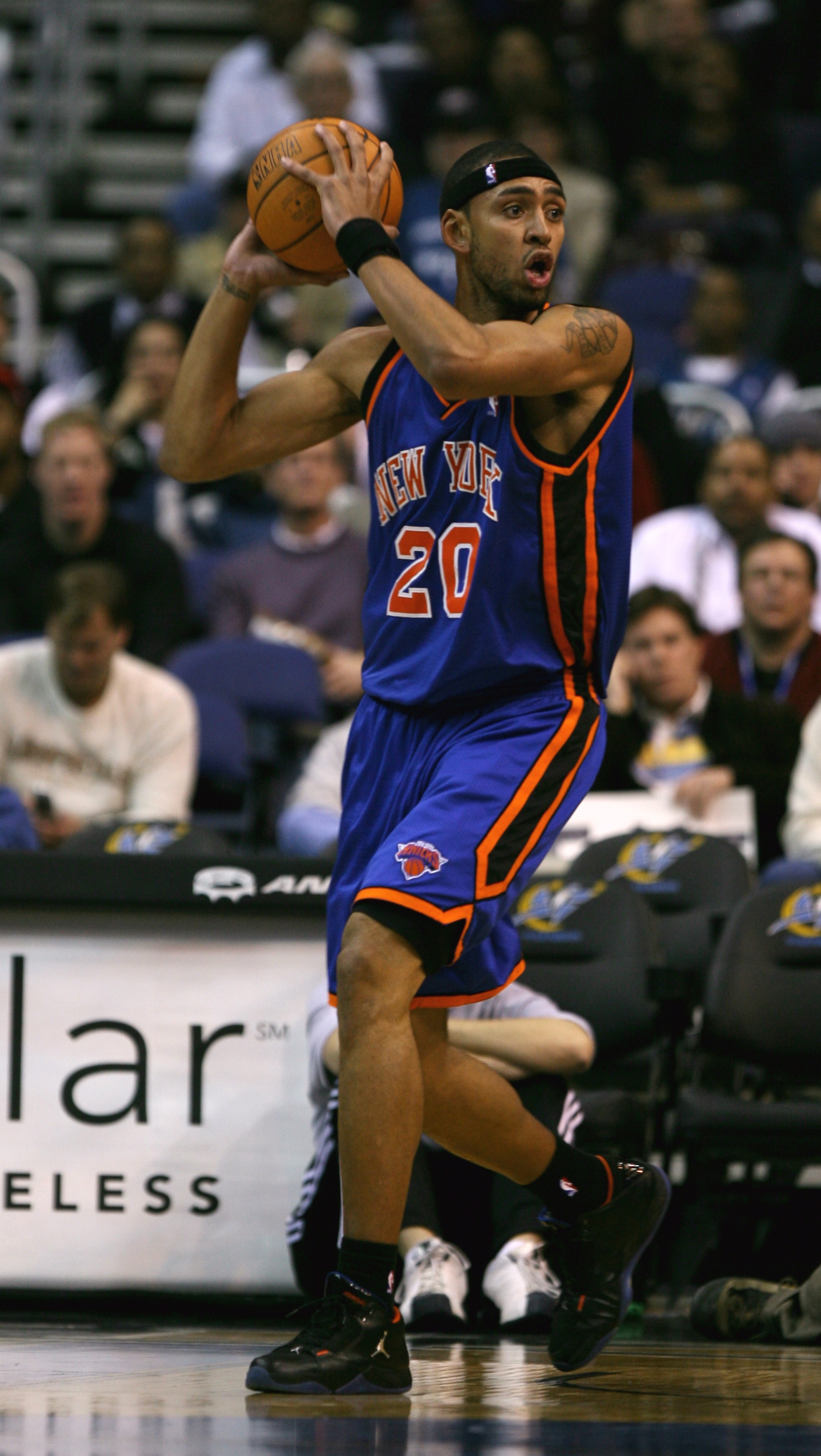
Jared Jeffries, Indiana, 2002

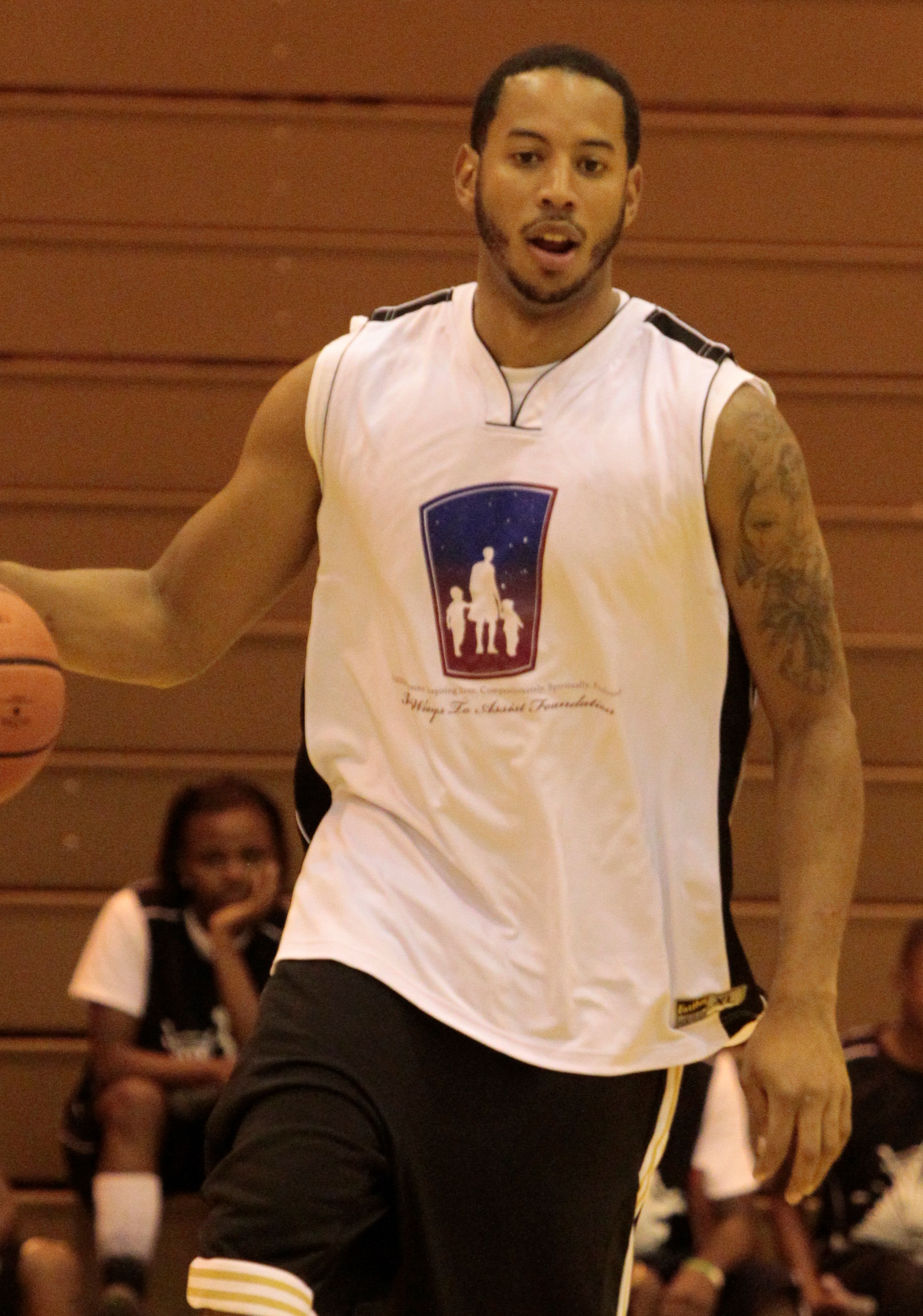
Devin Harris, Wisconsin, 2004

Men
Year	Player	School	Class	Reference
1945–46	Max Morris	Northwestern	Senior	
1946–47	Glen Selbo	Wisconsin	Senior	
1947–48	Murray Wier	Iowa	Senior	
1948–49	Dwight Eddleman	Illinois	Senior	
1949–50	Don Rehfeldt	Wisconsin	Senior	
1950–51	Don Sunderlage	Illinois	Senior	
1951–52	Chuck Darling	Iowa	Senior	
1952–53	Don Schlundt	Indiana	Sophomore	
1953–54	Johnny Kerr	Illinois	Senior	
1954–55	Chuck Mencel	Minnesota	Senior	
1955–56	Robin Freeman	Ohio State	Senior	
1956–57	Archie Dees	Indiana	Junior	
1957–58	Archie Dees (2)	Indiana	Senior	
1958–59	Johnny Green	Michigan State	Senior	
1959–60	Jerry Lucas	Ohio State	Sophomore	
1960–61	Jerry Lucas* (2)	Ohio State	Junior	
1961–62	Jerry Lucas* (3)	Ohio State	Senior	
1962–63	Gary Bradds	Ohio State	Junior	
1963–64	Gary Bradds* (2)	Ohio State	Senior	
1964–65	Cazzie Russell	Michigan	Junior	
1965–66	Cazzie Russell* (2)	Michigan	Senior	
1966–67	Jimmy Dawson	Illinois	Senior	
1967–68	Sam Williams	Iowa	Senior	
1968–69	Rick Mount	Purdue	Junior	
1969–70	Rick Mount (2)	Purdue	Senior	
1970–71	Jim Cleamons	Ohio State	Senior	
1971–72	Jim Brewer	Minnesota	Junior	
1972–73	Steve Downing	Indiana	Senior	
1973–74	Campy Russell	Michigan	Junior	
1974–75	Scott May	Indiana	Junior	
1975–76	Scott May* (2)	Indiana	Senior	
1976–77	Kent Benson	Indiana	Senior	
1977–78	Mychal Thompson	Minnesota	Senior	
1978–79	Magic Johnson	Michigan State	Sophomore	
1979–80	Mike Woodson	Indiana	Senior	
1980–81	Ray Tolbert	Indiana	Senior	
1981–82	Clark Kellogg	Ohio State	Junior	
1982–83	Randy Wittman	Indiana	Senior	
1983–84	Jim Rowinski	Purdue	Senior	
1984–85	Roy Tarpley	Michigan	Junior	
1985–86	Scott Skiles	Michigan State	Senior	
1986–87	Steve Alford	Indiana	Senior	
1987–88	Gary Grant	Michigan	Senior	
1988–89	Glen Rice	Michigan	Senior	
1989–90	Steve Smith	Michigan State	Junior	
1990–91	Jim Jackson	Ohio State	Sophomore	
1991–92	Jim Jackson* (2)	Ohio State	Junior	
1992–93	Calbert Cheaney*	Indiana	Senior	
1993–94	Glenn Robinson*	Purdue	Junior	
1994–95	Shawn Respert*	Michigan State	Senior	
1995–96	Brian Evans	Indiana	Senior	
1996–97	Bobby Jackson^{[a]}	Minnesota^{[a]}	Senior	
1997–98	Mateen Cleaves	Michigan State	Sophomore	
1998–99	Mateen Cleaves (2)	Michigan State	Junior	
1999–00	Morris Peterson	Michigan State	Senior	
2000–01	Frank Williams	Illinois	Sophomore	
2001–02	Jared Jeffries	Indiana	Sophomore	
2002–03	Brian Cook	Illinois	Senior	
2003–04	Devin Harris	Wisconsin	Junior	
2004–05	Dee Brown*	Illinois	Junior	
2005–06	Terence Dials	Ohio State	Senior	
2006–07	Alando Tucker	Wisconsin	Senior	

Women
Year	Player	School	Class	Reference
1945–46	No award			
1946–47	No award			
1947–48	No award			
1948–49	No award			
1949–50	No award			
1950–51	No award			
1951–52	No award			
1952–53	No award			
1953–54	No award			
1954–55	No award			
1955–56	No award			
1956–57	No award			
1957–58	No award			
1958–59	No award			
1959–60	No award			
1960–61	No award			
1961–62	No award			
1962–63	No award			
1963–64	No award			
1964–65	No award			
1965–66	No award			
1966–67	No award			
1967–68	No award			
1968–69	No award			
1969–70	No award			
1970–71	No award			
1971–72	No award			
1972–73	No award			
1973–74	No award			
1974–75	No award			
1975–76	No award			
1976–77	No award			
1977–78	No award			
1978–79	No award			
1979–80	No award			
1980–81	No award			
1981–82	No award			
1982–83	No award			
1983–84	No award			
1984–85	No award			
1985–86	No award			
1986–87	No award			
1987–88	Michelle Edwards	Iowa	Senior	
1988–89	Nikita Lowry	Ohio State	Senior	
1989–90	Franthea Price	Iowa	Senior	
1990–91	Joy Holmes	Purdue	Senior	
1991–92	MaChelle Joseph	Purdue	Senior	
1992–93	Audrey Burcy	Ohio State	Senior	
1993–94	Carol Ann Shudlick*	Minnesota	Senior	
1994–95	Stacey Lovelace	Purdue	Junior	
1995–96	Katie Smith	Ohio State	Senior	
1996–97	Jannon Roland	Purdue	Senior	
1997–98	Tangela Smith	Iowa	Senior	
1998–99	Stephanie White*	Purdue	Senior	
1999–00	Helen Darling	Penn State	Senior	
2000–01	Katie Douglas	Purdue	Senior	
2001–02	Lindsay Whalen	Minnesota	Sophomore	
2002–03	Kelly Mazzante	Penn State	Junior	
2003–04	Kelly Mazzante (2)	Penn State	Senior	
2004–05	Jessica Davenport	Ohio State	Sophomore	
2005–06	Jessica Davenport (2)	Ohio State	Junior	
2006–07	Jessica Davenport (3)	Ohio State	Senior	

^{a} Bobby Jackson's selection was later vacated (along with that season's win total and all other accolades) due to an academic fraud scandal that ruled the entire team ineligible.

== Winners by school ==
Men
School (year joined)	Winners	Years
Indiana (1899)	14	1953, 1957, 1958, 1973, 1975, 1976, 1977, 1980, 1981, 1983, 1987, 1993, 1996, 2002
Ohio State (1912)	11	1956, 1960, 1961, 1962, 1963, 1964, 1971, 1982, 1991, 1992, 2006
Michigan State (1950)	8	1959, 1979, 1986, 1990, 1995, 1998, 1999, 2000
Illinois (1896)	7	1949, 1951, 1954, 1967, 2001, 2003, 2005
Michigan (1896)	6	1965, 1966, 1974, 1985, 1988, 1989
Minnesota (1896)	4	1955, 1972, 1978, 1997 vacated^{[a]}
Purdue (1896)	4	1969, 1970, 1984, 1994
Wisconsin (1896)	4	1947, 1950, 2004, 2007
Iowa (1899)	3	1948, 1952, 1968
Northwestern (1896)	1	1946
Chicago (1896)	0	—
Penn State (1990)	0	—

Women
School (year joined)	Winners	Years
Ohio State (1912)	6	1989, 1993, 1996, 2005, 2006, 2007
Purdue (1896)	6	1991, 1992, 1995, 1997, 1999, 2001
Iowa (1899)	3	1988, 1990, 1998
Penn State (1990)	3	2000, 2003, 2004
Minnesota (1896)	2	1994, 2002
Illinois (1896)	0	—
Indiana (1899)	0	—
Michigan (1896)	0	—
Michigan State (1950)	0	—
Northwestern (1896)	0	—
Wisconsin (1896)	0	—

Current Big Ten Conference teams not listed in the winners by school charts above is because they joined the conference after 2007 when the Chicago Tribune Silver Basketball was last awarded.

== See also ==
- Chicago Tribune Silver Football – equivalent award for Big Ten Conference football
- Big Ten Conference Men's Basketball Player of the Year – voted upon by the league's coaches and media (1985–present)
- Big Ten Conference Women's Basketball Player of the Year – voted upon by the league's coaches and media (1983–present)
