= Big Ten Conference Women's Basketball Player of the Year =

- Awarded for: the most outstanding basketball player in the Big Ten Conference
- Country: United States
- Presented by: Big Ten head coaches (1983–present); Big Ten media (1996–present)
- First award: 1983
- Currently held by: Lauren Betts, UCLA

The Big Ten Conference Women's Basketball Player of the Year is a basketball award given to the Big Ten Conference's most outstanding player. The award was first given following the Big Ten's first full season of women's basketball in 1982–83 (although the conference held its first postseason tournament the previous season). The league's head coaches have presented the award since 1983; media members who cover Big Ten women's basketball began presenting their own version of the award in 1996. (Note: Big Ten records do not directly state when media began presenting a Player of the Year award. However, the Big Ten's 2014–15 women's basketball media guide, the primary reference for this article, explicitly states that media members began selecting an all-conference team in the 1995–96 season (see p. 76). It can therefore be safely assumed that media began choosing their own Player of the Year at that time.)

Ten players have won the award multiple times. Six players have won twice: Anucha Browne of Northwestern (1984, 1985), Tracey Hall of Ohio State (1986, 1987), Katie Douglas of Purdue (2000, 2001), Kelly Mazzante of Penn State (2003, 2004), Maggie Lucas of Penn State (2013, 2014), and Megan Gustafson of Iowa (2018, 2019). Four players have won more than two awards. Ohio State's Jantel Lavender is the only four-time winner (2008–2011), though only the 2009 and 2010 awards were unanimous (she won the coaches' award in 2008 and the media award in 2011). Jessica Davenport, also of Ohio State, and Caitlin Clark of Iowa are the only players to have been the unanimous winner of three awards (Davenport: 2005–2007; Clark: 2022–2024). Ohio State's other three-time winner, Kelsey Mitchell, won the coaches' award in 2015 and 2018 and both awards in 2017.

Five players have won a major national player of the year award in the same season in which they were Big Ten Player of the Year. Michelle Edwards of Iowa won the Rawlings/Women Basketball Coaches Association national player of the year award in 1988; Carol Ann Shudlick of Minnesota won the Wade Trophy in 1994; Stephanie White of Purdue won the Wade Trophy and Honda Award in 1999; Megan Gustafson won the Naismith and Honda Awards in 2019, and was also named national player of the year by AP and the United States Basketball Writers Association; and Caitlin Clark won all significant national awards in both 2023 and 2024.

The coaches and media have split their honors six times in all, with the most recent being 2018, when Mitchell won the coaches' award and Gustafson won the media award.

Ohio State has the record for the most awards with 15, and the most individuals who have won the award, with seven. Of schools that were Big Ten members before the 2024–25 season, three have never had a winner: long-established member Indiana, and the two schools that joined the conference in 2014, Maryland and Rutgers. The four schools that joined in 2024 produced the last two winners: USC in 2025 and UCLA in 2026. The other two new members from 2024, Oregon and Washington, have not yet produced a winner.

== Key ==
†	Co-Players of the Year
C	Coaches selection
M	Media selection
*	Awarded a national player of the year award that same season: Wade Trophy (1977–78 to present); Naismith College Player of the Year (1982–83 to present); John R. Wooden Award (2003–04 to present)
Player (X)	Denotes the number of times the player has been named the Big Ten Player of the Year at that point

== Winners ==
Season	Player	School	Position	Class	Reference
1982–83	Laura Coenen	Minnesota		Sophomore	
1983–84	Anucha Browne	Northwestern		Junior	
1984–85	Anucha Browne (2)	Northwestern		Senior	
1985–86	Tracey Hall	Ohio State		Sophomore	
1986–87	Tracey Hall (2)	Ohio State		Junior	
1987–88	Michelle Edwards	Iowa	G	Senior	
1988–89	Lisa Cline	Ohio State	F	Senior	
1989–90	Franthea Price	Iowa	G	Senior	
1990–91	Joy Holmes	Purdue	F	Senior	
1991–92	MaChelle Joseph	Purdue	G	Senior	
1992–93	Toni Foster	Iowa	F	Senior	
1993–94	Carol Ann Shudlick*	Minnesota	F/C	Senior	
1994–95	Stacey Lovelace	Purdue	F	Junior	
1995–96	Katie Smith	Ohio State	F	Senior	
1996–97	Ashley Berggren	Illinois	G	Junior	
1997–98	Tangela Smith	Iowa	C	Senior	
1998–99	Stephanie White*	Purdue	G	Senior	
1999–2000^{†}	Helen Darling^{C}	Penn State	G	Senior	
1999–2000^{†}	Katie Douglas^{M}	Purdue	G	Junior	
2000–01	Katie Douglas (2)	Purdue	G	Senior	
2001–02	Lindsay Whalen	Minnesota	G	Sophomore	
2002–03	Kelly Mazzante	Penn State	G	Junior	
2003–04	Kelly Mazzante (2)	Penn State	G	Senior	
2004–05	Jessica Davenport	Ohio State	C	Sophomore	
2005–06	Jessica Davenport (2)	Ohio State	C	Junior	
2006–07	Jessica Davenport (3)	Ohio State	C	Senior	
2007–08^{†}	Jolene Anderson^{M}	Wisconsin	G	Senior	
2007–08^{†}	Jantel Lavender^{C}	Ohio State	C	Freshman	
2008–09	Jantel Lavender (2)	Ohio State	C	Sophomore	
2009–10	Jantel Lavender (3)	Ohio State	C	Junior	
2010–11^{†}	Kalisha Keane^{C}	Michigan State	F	Senior	
2010–11^{†}	Jantel Lavender (4)^{M}	Ohio State	C	Senior	
2011–12	Samantha Prahalis	Ohio State	G	Senior	
2012–13	Maggie Lucas	Penn State	G	Junior	
2013–14^{†}	Jordan Hooper^{C}	Nebraska	F	Senior	
2013–14^{†}	Maggie Lucas (2)^{M}	Penn State	G	Senior	
2014–15^{†}	Kelsey Mitchell^{C}	Ohio State	G	Freshman	
2014–15^{†}	Amanda Zahui B.^{M}	Minnesota	C	Sophomore	
2015–16	Rachel Banham	Minnesota	G	Senior	
2016–17	Kelsey Mitchell (2)	Ohio State	G	Junior	
2017–18^{†}	Kelsey Mitchell^{C} (3)	Ohio State	G	Senior	
2017–18^{†}	Megan Gustafson^{M}	Iowa	F	Junior	
2018–19	Megan Gustafson* (2)	Iowa	F	Senior	
2019–20	Kathleen Doyle	Iowa	G	Senior	
2020–21	Naz Hillmon	Michigan	F	Junior	
2021–22	Caitlin Clark	Iowa	G	Sophomore	
2022–23	Caitlin Clark* (2)	Iowa	G	Junior	
2023–24	Caitlin Clark* (3)	Iowa	G	Senior	
2024–25	JuJu Watkins*	USC	G	Sophomore	
2025–26	Lauren Betts	UCLA	C	Senior	

== Winners by school ==
School (year joined)	Winners	Years
Ohio State (1912)	15	1986, 1987, 1989, 1996, 2005, 2006, 2007, 2008^{†}, 2009, 2010, 2011^{†}, 2012, 2015^{†}, 2017, 2018^{†}
Iowa (1900)	10	1988, 1990, 1993, 1998, 2018^{†}, 2019, 2020, 2022, 2023, 2024
Minnesota (1896)	5	1983, 1994, 2002, 2015^{†}, 2016
Penn State (1993)	5	2000^{†}, 2003, 2004, 2013, 2014^{†}
Purdue (1896)	5	1991, 1992, 1995, 2000^{†}, 2001
Northwestern (1896)	2	1984, 1985
Illinois (1896)	1	1997
Michigan (1896)	1	2021
Michigan State (1953)	1	2011^{†}
Nebraska (2011)	1	2014^{†}
UCLA (2024)	1	2026
USC (2024)	1	2025
Wisconsin (1896)	1	2008^{†}
Indiana (1900)	0	—
Maryland (2014)	0	—
Oregon (2024)	0	—
Rutgers (2014)	0	—
Washington (2024)	0	—

== See also ==
- Chicago Tribune Silver Basketball, another award formerly presented to the Big Ten men's and women's players of the year
