= Big Ten Conference Women's Basketball Freshman of the Year =

Basketball award

- Awarded for: the top women's basketball freshman in the Big Ten Conference
- Country: United States

History
- First award: 1983
- Most recent: Jazzy Davidson, USC

The Big Ten Conference Women's Basketball Freshman of the Year is an annual college basketball award presented to the top women's basketball freshman in the Big Ten Conference.

== Key ==
†	Co-Freshman of the Year
C	Coaches selection
M	Media selection
*	Awarded a national Freshman of the Year award: USBWA National Freshman of the Year (USBWA); WBCA Freshman of the Year (WBCA)

== Winners ==
Season	Player	School	National Freshman of the Year Awards	Source(s)
1982–83	Linda Cunningham	Indiana	—	
1983–84	Lisa Becker	Iowa	—	
1984–85	Tracey Hall	Ohio State	—	
1985–86	Lisa Cline	Ohio State	—	
1986–87	Franthea Price	Iowa	—	
1987–88	Kay Frederickson	Wisconsin	—	
1988–89	MaChelle Joseph	Purdue	—	
1989–90	Averrill Roberts	Ohio State	—	
1990–91	Mandy Cunningham	Illinois	—	
1991–92	Barb Franke	Wisconsin	—	
1992–93	Katie Smith*	Ohio State	USBWA	
1993–94	Leslie Johnson*	Purdue	USBWA	
1994–95	Tiffany Gooden	Iowa	—	
1995–96	Nicole Cushing	Michigan State	—	
1996–97	Stacey Thomas	Michigan	—	
1997–98	LaTonya Sims	Wisconsin	—	
1998–99	Jessie Stomski	Wisconsin	—	
1999–2000	LaToya Turner	Ohio State	—	
2000–01	Kelly Mazzante	Penn State	—	
2001–02	Janel McCarville	Minnesota	—	
2002–03	Lindsay Bowen ^{C}	Michigan State	—	
2002–03	Liz Shimek ^{M}	Michigan State	—	
2003–04	Jessica Davenport ^{C}	Ohio State	—	
2003–04	Katie Gearlds ^{M}	Purdue	—	
2004–05	Jolene Anderson	Wisconsin	—	
2005–06	Megan Skouby	Iowa	—	
2006–07	Allyssa DeHaan	Michigan State	—	
2007–08	Jantel Lavender	Ohio State	—	
2008–09	Samantha Prahalis	Ohio State	—	
2009–10	Jaime Printy	Iowa	—	
2010–11	Maggie Lucas	Penn State	—	
2011–12	Rachel Banham	Minnesota	—	
2012–13	Maggie Lyon	Northwestern	—	
2013–14	Amanda Zahui B.	Minnesota	—	
2014–15	Kelsey Mitchell*	Ohio State	USBWA	
2015–16	Jessica Shepard	Nebraska	—	
2016–17	Destiny Slocum*	Maryland	WBCA	
2017–18	Destiny Pitts	Minnesota	—	
2018–19	Taylor Mikesell ^{C}	Maryland	—	
2018–19	Naz Hillmon ^{M}	Michigan	—	
2019–20	Ashley Owusu	Maryland	—	
2020–21	Caitlin Clark*	Iowa	USBWA; WBCA	
2021–22	Alexis Markowski	Nebraska	—	
2022–23	Cotie McMahon	Ohio State	—	
2023–24	Natalie Potts ^{C}	Nebraska	—	
2023–24	Mary Ashley Stevenson ^{M}	Purdue	—	
2024–25	Olivia Olson ^{C}	Michigan	—	
2024–25	Jaloni Cambridge ^{CM}	Ohio State	—	
2025–26	Jazzy Davidson*	USC	—	

== Winners by school ==
School (year joined)	Winners	Years
Ohio State	11	1985, 1986, 1990, 1993, 2000, 2004, 2008, 2009, 2015, 2023, 2025
Iowa	6	1984, 1987, 1995, 2006, 2010, 2021
Wisconsin	5	1988, 1992, 1998, 1999, 2005
Minnesota	4	2002, 2012, 2014, 2018
Purdue	4	1989, 1994, 2004, 2024
Maryland (2014)	3	2017, 2019, 2020
Michigan	3	1997, 2019, 2025
Michigan State	3	1996, 2003, 2007
Nebraska (2011)	3	2016, 2022, 2024
Penn State (1992)	2	2001, 2011
Illinois	1	1991
Indiana	1	1983
Northwestern	1	2013
USC (2024)	1	2026
Rutgers (2014)	0	—
Oregon (2024)	0	—
UCLA (2024)	0	—
Washington (2024)	0	—
