= Natalie Potts =

American basketball player

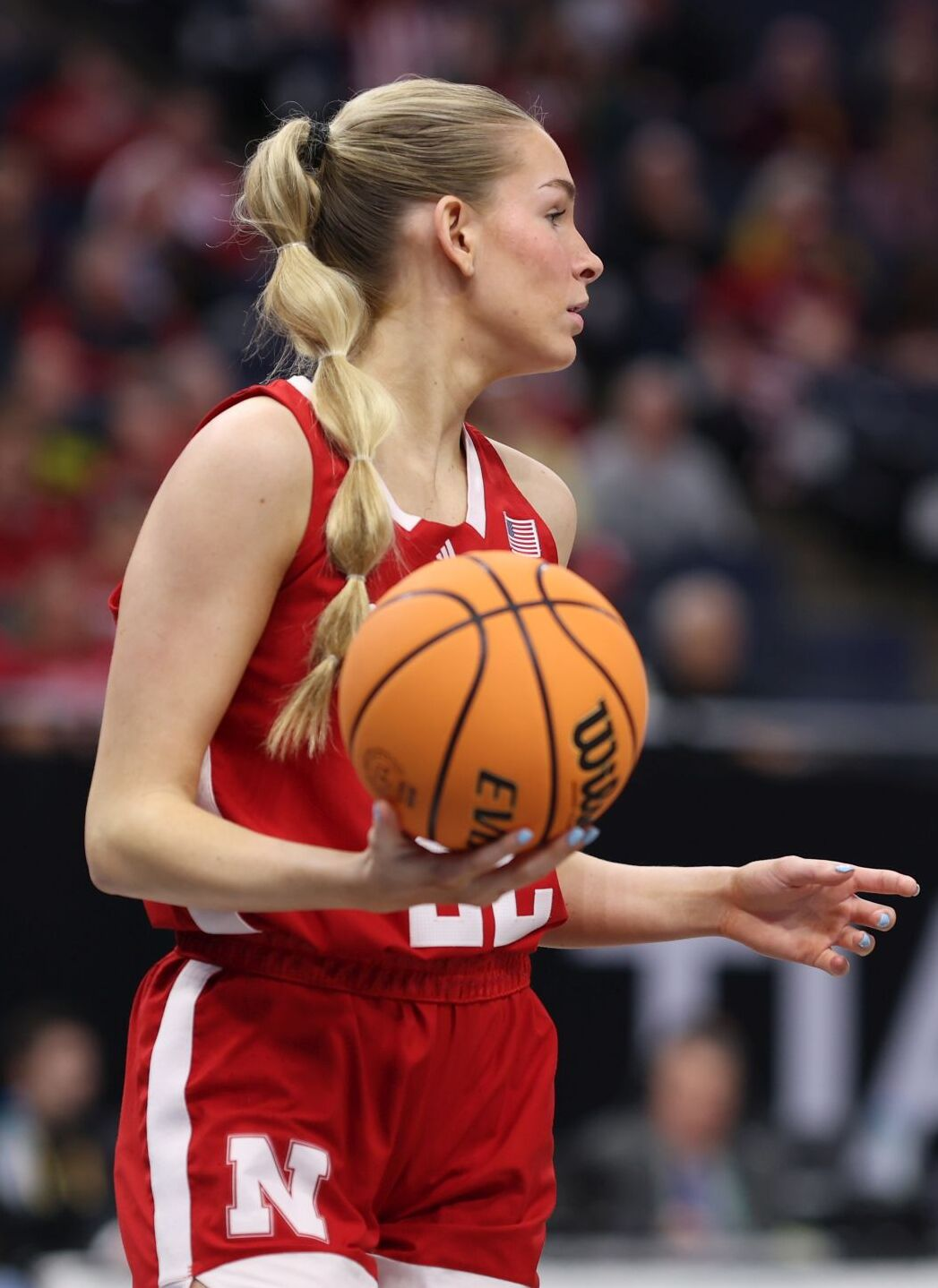
- Potts with Nebraska in 2024

No. 22 – Nebraska Cornhuskers
- Position: Forward
- League: Big Ten Conference

Personal information
- Born: November 7, 2004 (age 20); St. Louis, Missouri, U.S.
- Listed height: 6 ft 2 in (1.88 m)

Career information
- High school: Incarnate Word Academy (Bel-Nor, Missouri)
- College: Nebraska (2023–present)

Career highlights
- Big Ten Freshman of the Year – Coaches (2024); Big Ten All-Freshman Team (2024)

Natalie Potts (born November 7, 2004) is an American college basketball player for the Nebraska Cornhuskers of the Big Ten Conference.

== Early life and high school career ==
Natalie Potts was born on November 7, 2004 in O'Fallon, Missouri. She attended Incarnate Word Academy in Bel Nor, Missouri. During her senior year, she averaged 18.7 points, 7.4 rebounds, and 2.9 assists per game, playing a key role in leading the team to its sixth consecutive Missouri state championship in 2023. Potts earned Missouri MaxPreps Player of the Year honors twice in 2021 and 2023, and also received the Gatorade Player of the Year award as a sophomore in 2021. Potts finished her high school career with 2,108 points and 1,008 rebounds over four seasons, becoming only the third player in Missouri high school history to achieve the combined milestones of 2,000 points and 1,000 rebounds.

== College career ==
In her freshman season, Potts was named Big Ten Freshman of the Year by the conference coaches. She was a unanimous selection for the Big Ten All-Freshman Team and earned honorable mention All-Big Ten recognition from the league's media. Potts was also announced as the Big Ten Freshman of the Week 8 times in her freshman year.

Potts played only five games in her sophomore season before sustaining a season-ending ACL injury on November 19, 2024, in an 85–48 victory over North Alabama.

== Career statistics ==
Legend
GP	Games played	GS	Games started	MPG	Minutes per game	RPG	Rebounds per game
APG	Assists per game	SPG	Steals per game	BPG	Blocks per game	PPG	Points per game
TO	Turnovers per game	FG%	Field-goal percentage	3P%	3-point field-goal percentage	FT%	Free-throw percentage
**Bold**	Career best	°	League leader

=== College ===
Year	Team	GP	GS	MPG	FG%	3P%	FT%	RPG	APG	SPG	BPG	TO	PPG
2023–24	Nebraska	35	35	24.5	48.9	25.4	82.9	5.5	0.8	0.9	0.7	1.5	10.2
2024–25	Nebraska	5	5	21.6	68.4	72.7	80.0	7.4	0.4	0.6	0.6	1.4	14.4
**Career**		40	40	24.2	51.3	32.1	82.4	5.8	0.7	0.9	0.7	1.5	10.7
Statistics retrieved from Sports-Reference.
