= Incarnate Word Academy (Missouri) =

High school in Bel-Nor, Missouri, US

Location
- 2788 Normandy Avenue; Bel-Nor, Missouri 63121; United States; 38.6995°N 90.3124°W

Information
- Type: Private high school
- Motto: Latin: Amor meus (My love)
- Religious affiliation: Roman Catholic
- Established: 1932; 94 years ago
- Grades: 9–12
- Colors: Red and gold
- Nickname: Red Knights
- Accreditation: Cognia
- Website: iwacademy.org

Incarnate Word Academy is a Catholic, private, secondary school for girls. The school is sponsored by the Congregation of the Sisters of Charity of the Incarnate Word.

== History ==
In 1932, the Sisters of Charity of the Incarnate Word opened the all-girls high school in response to a need for the education of young women. In the first year, the school enrolled thirty-five students. Three additional buildings and seventy-five years later, the school is now home to about five hundred students.

== Athletics ==
Incarnate Word set the national record in girls high school basketball by winning 141 consecutive games from 2020 to 2025.

== Notable alumnae ==
- Napheesa Collier – American basketball player (born 1996)
- Shandi Finnessey – American model (born 1978)
- Natalie Potts – American basketball player
