= Tracey Hall =

American basketball player

Personal information
- Listed height: 6 ft 0 in (1.83 m)

Career information
- College: Ohio State (1984–1988)
- Position: Guard

Career highlights
- 2× Kodak All-American (1987, 1988); 2× Big Ten Player of the Year (1986, 1987); 3× First-team All-Big Ten (1986–1988); Big Ten Freshman of the Year (1985)

Tracey Hall, or Tracey Hall Yarbrough, is an American former women's basketball player for Ohio State University. She became the Big-Ten's first two-time Kodak All-American team member competing in 1987 and 1988. At Ohio State University, she still ranks #1 in rebounds, #1 in FG%, #2 in scoring, #3 in steals and #4 in games played.

She ranks second on the school's all-time scoring list with 1,912 career points and 1 60.0 Field Goal Percentage. She also owns the school's rebounding record with 1,115. She is the only player in school history to get 300 rebounds in a single season. She started every game of her collegiate career, scored in double figures in 101 games. During her tenure, Ohio State's record was an incredible 102–20. In 1986, she was selected as the Ohio State athlete of the year.

== Personal life ==
Tracey and her husband, Reese Yarbrough, were childhood friends. They have two sons.

== Recognitions ==
- Selected for Induction into the OSU Sports Hall of Fame 1998
- Big Ten Player of the Year 1987
- Big Ten Player of the Year 1986
- Big Ten Freshman of the Year
- Second Team all-Big Ten 1985
- OSU Letterwinner 1985 to 1988

recognitions citation

== Team memberships ==
- Big Ten All-Decade team
- Kodak All-American team 1988
- OSU Team 1988
  - OSU team of 1988 competed in the NCAA Sweet 16
- World University Gates Team 1987
- Kodak All-American team 1987
- OSU Team 1987
  - OSU team of 1987 competed in the NCAA final eight
  - OSU team of 1987 played in co-championship
- USA Basketball Select Team 1986
- OSU Team 1986
  - OSU team of 1986 competed in the NCAA Sweet 16
  - OSU team of 1986 played in Big Ten championship
- OSU Team 1985
  - OSU team of 1985 competed in the NCAA final eight
  - OSU team of 1985 played in Big Ten championship

memberships citation

== Ohio State statistics ==
Legend
GP	Games played	GS	Games started	MPG	Minutes per game
FG%	Field goal percentage	3P%	3-point field goal percentage	FT%	Free throw percentage
RPG	Rebounds per game	APG	Assists per game	SPG	Steals per game
BPG	Blocks per game	PPG	Points per game	**Bold**	Career high

Year	Team	GP	Points	FG%	FT%	RPG	APG	SPG	BPG	PPG
1984–85	Ohio State	**31**	396	60.1%	69.0%	8.3	2.1	1.9	0.7	12.8
1985–86	Ohio State	30	498	61.7%	73.6%	9.5	1.8	2.1	**1.0**	16.6
1986–87	Ohio State	**31**	506	**62.0%**	72.5%	**9.8**	**2.9**	1.9	1.0	16.3
1987–88	Ohio State	30	**512**	56.3%	**78.1%**	9.0	2.6	**2.6**	0.8	**17.1**
Totals	Ohio State	122	1912	60.0%	74.1%	9.1	2.3	2.1	0.9	15.7

== USA Basketball ==
Hall was selected to be a member of the team representing the US at the 1987 World University Games held in Zagreb, Yugoslavia. The USA team won four of the five contests. After winning their next game against Finland, the USA faced the host team Yugoslavia. The game went to overtime, but Yugoslavia prevailed, 93–89. The USA faced China in the next game. They won 84–83, but they needed to win by at least five points to remain in medal contention. They won the final game against Canada to secure fifth place. Hall averaged 9.6 points per game and 4.0 rebounds per game.
