= Joy Holmes =

American basketball player (born 1969)

Joy Holmes-Harris
Personal information
- Born: March 31, 1969 (age 57) Mansfield, Ohio, U.S.
- Listed height: 5 ft 10 in (1.78 m)
- Listed weight: 160 lb (73 kg)

Career information
- High school: Mansfield Senior (Mansfield, Ohio)
- College: Purdue (1987–1991)
- Position: Forward

Career history
- 2000: Detroit Shock

Career highlights
- Kodak All-American (1991); Big Ten Female Athlete of the Year (1991); Chicago Tribune Silver Basketball (1991); Big Ten Player of the Year (1991); First-team All-Big Ten (1989–1991)
- Stats at Basketball Reference

Joy Holmes Harris (born March 31, 1969) is an American former basketball player. She starred at Mansfield Senior High School, her 1259 overall points were a record during 1987 and remained in the top five in 2024. At Purdue University, her team played in the 1988 National Women's Invitational Tournament championship game and the regional semifinals of the 1990 NCAA Division I women's basketball tournament. During 1991, she was a Big Ten Athlete of the Year and held the Purdue overall record with 1747 points.

After university, Holmes played for Sekisui Harmonate in Japan until 1993. With the American Basketball League between 1997 and 1998, Holmes was with the Seattle Reign and Nashville Noise. As part of the Women's National Basketball Association, Holmes was a member of the Detroit Shock in 2000. As an assistant coach, she worked for the University of Cincinnati, Middle Tennessee State University and Indiana University–Purdue University Indianapolis by 2004. Holmes Harris became part of the Ohio Basketball Hall of Fame in 2016.

== Early life and education ==
Joy Holmes was born in Mansfield, Ohio, on March 31, 1969. During her childhood, she lived with four siblings and was interested in scouting. Holmes became a basketball player while in elementary school. With Mansfield Senior High School, she was on their volleyball team during the 1980s.

As an athlete, she entered the 1986 Ohio championship as a Class AAA competitor. At the event, she competed in the 300 meter hurdles and reached the heats. On the basketball team, they were regional finalists for the Class AAA division held by the Ohio High School Athletic Association in 1987. She was also named All-Ohio by The Associated Press during 1986 and 1987. After setting a school record with 1259 overall points in 1987, her points remained in the top five during 2024.

With Purdue University, Holmes was playing basketball in 1987. At the 1988 National Women's Invitational Tournament, her team reached the championship game. By 1989, Holmes was nicknamed "the Magnet from Mansfield". Her team reached the regional semifinals at the 1990 NCAA Division I women's basketball tournament.

At Purdue, Holmes had the most season points once and most season steals three times. In overall statistics, Holmes led the university with 323 steals and 1747 points during 1991. Her points record was broken that year and her steals remained in first until 2001. During 2023, she was eighth in points and third in steals for Purdue. Apart from basketball, Holmes studied telecommunications.

== Career ==
=== Playing career ===
As part of the North basketball team, they finished first at the 1989 U.S. Olympic Festival. She decided to not compete at the World University Games after receiving a spot in 1991. That year, Holmes joined a basketball team in Japan for Sekisui Chemical. She played for the Sekisui Harmonate until "[the] league...[banned] American players" during 1993.

In 1996, Holmes Harris was drafted to play in the American Basketball League. That year, she wanted to join the Women's National Basketball Association after she declined her offer from the Seattle Reign. She considered joining the Columbus Quest after being drafted again by the Reign in 1997. Holmes played with the Reign from 1997 to 1998. In 1998, Holmes was selected to join a new ABL team in Nashville. She played for the Nashville Noise until the closure of the ABL that year. With the two teams, she had a combined total of 211 rebounds and 299 points.

In the WNBA, Holmes joined the Washington Mystics during 1999 and was cut that year. During 2000, Holmes played for the Detroit Shock. With Detroit, Holmes had 45 rebounds as part of her 91 points that year.

=== Other positions ===
Holmes joined the University of Cincinnati as an assistant coach in 1993. While continuing her Cincinnati position as Joy Holmes-Harris, she became an athlete advisor for Purdue during 1994. After leaving Cincinnati that year, Holmes-Harris became a "volunteer assistant coach for Lafayette Jeff's girls basketball [team]." The following year, she remained in her advisor position with Purdue.

In Mansfield, Holmes taught children basketball during 1998. She was hired by Middle Tennessee State University in 1999 as an assistant coach. Holmes-Harris remained with MTSU until 2000. With Indiana University–Purdue University Indianapolis, she resumed her assistant experience when she joined in 2002. That year, Holmes-Harris started her real estate agent career. She remained at IUPUI in 2003 and had left by 2004. Holmes-Harris continued working in real estate leading up to 2017.

== Career statistics ==
Legend
GP	Games played	GS	Games started	MPG	Minutes per game	RPG	Rebounds per game
APG	Assists per game	SPG	Steals per game	BPG	Blocks per game	PPG	Points per game
TO	Turnovers per game	FG%	Field-goal percentage	3P%	3-point field-goal percentage	FT%	Free-throw percentage
**Bold**	Career best	°	League leader

=== WNBA ===
==== Regular season ====
Year	Team	GP	GS	MPG	FG%	3P%	FT%	RPG	APG	SPG	BPG	TO	PPG
2000	Detroit	29	0	9.3	47.1	36.4	70.0	1.6	0.5	0.4	0.1	0.6	3.1
Career	1 year, 1 team	29	0	9.3	47.1	36.4	70.0	1.6	0.5	0.4	0.1	0.6	3.1

=== College ===
Year	Team	GP	GS	MPG	FG%	3P%	FT%	RPG	APG	SPG	BPG	TO	PPG
1987–88	Purdue	**31**	-	-	**58.8**	0.0	60.9	2.3	0.7	0.8	0.5	-	4.8
1988–89	Purdue	30	-	-	56.2	0.0	68.0	6.3	**2.1**	3.3	1.0	-	15.7
1989–90	Purdue	30	-	-	53.4	25.0	**77.2**	7.2	1.6	3.3	**1.4**	-	16.8
1990–91	Purdue	29	-	-	56.9	**36.0**	73.7	**9.2**	2.0	**3.4**	**1.4**	-	**21.5**
**Career**		120	-	-	55.9	30.6	72.1	6.2	1.6	2.7	1.1	-	14.6
Statistics retrieved from Sports-Reference.

== Honors and personal life ==
Between 1989 and 1991, Holmes was on consecutive All-Big Ten teams. From Purdue, Holmes was named Best Defensive Player during 1989 and Most Valuable Player in 1990. She was an MVP and Athlete of the Year during 1991. Throughout 1991, she was the Athlete of the Decade and on the All-Decade Team for the university. She was also an All-America player for Kodak and the United States Basketball Writers Association.

In other 1991 awards, she was the Big Ten Conference Women's Basketball Player of the Year and was an All-Decade player. Holmes was one of the recipients of the Big Ten Medal of Honor and Big Ten Athlete of the Year. From publications, she received that year's Chicago Tribune Silver Basketball. In 1997, Holmes became part of the Leroy Keyes Purdue Athletics Hall of Fame. Holmes Harris joined the Ohio Basketball Hall of Fame in 2016. During 2017, Purdue created bobbleheads of Holmes-Harris. She is married and has three children. Her son, Gary, is a professional basketball player for the Milwaukee Bucks.
