= Rachel Banham =

American basketball player (born 1993)

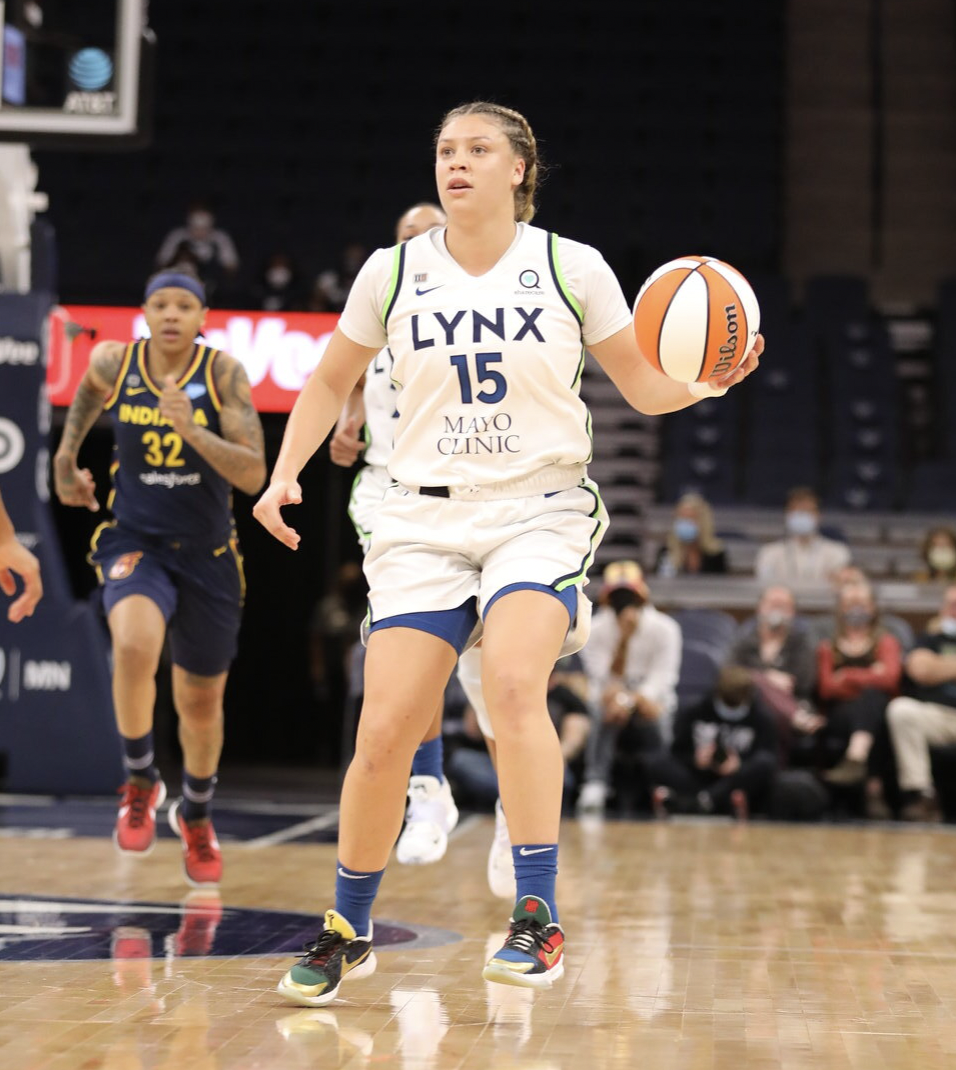
- Banham (right) with the Minnesota Lynx in 2021

No. 24 – Chicago Sky
- Position: Point guard
- League: WNBA

Personal information
- Born: July 15, 1993 (age 33) Minneapolis, Minnesota, U.S.
- Listed height: 5 ft 10 in (1.78 m)
- Listed weight: 181 lb (82 kg)

Career information
- High school: Lakeville North (Lakeville, Minnesota)
- College: Minnesota (2011–2016)
- WNBA draft: 2016: 1st round, 4th overall pick
- Drafted by: Connecticut Sun
- Playing career: 2016–present

Career history

Playing
- 2016–2019: Connecticut Sun
- 2020–2023: Minnesota Lynx
- 2024: Connecticut Sun
- 2024–present: Chicago Sky
- 2026: Lunar Owls BC

Coaching
- 2023–2024: Minnesota (assistant)

Career highlights
- First-team All-American – AP (2016); 2× Honorable Mention All-American – AP, WBCA (2013, 2014); All-American – USBWA, (2016); Big Ten Female Athlete of the Year (2016); Big Ten Player of the Year (2016); 3× First-team All-Big Ten – Coaches (2013, 2014, 2016); 2× Second-team All-Big Ten – Media (2012, 2013); Big Ten Freshman of the Year (2012); Big Ten All-Freshman Team (2012); Minnesota Miss Basketball (2011)
- Stats at Basketball Reference

Rachel Banham (born July 15, 1993) is an American professional basketball player for the Chicago Sky of the Women's National Basketball Association (WNBA) and the Lunar Owls of Unrivaled. Banham played guard for the Minnesota Golden Gophers women's basketball team, where she set a number of team records. Banham was drafted by the Connecticut Sun with the 4th pick of the 2016 WNBA draft. Banham was traded to the Minnesota Lynx in 2020, and later signed with the Sky in 2024.

== Early life ==
Banham was born on July 15, 1993, in Minneapolis, Minnesota.

Banham went to Lakeville North High School in Lakeville, Minnesota and graduated in 2011. She started on the varsity basketball team as an 8th grade student. During her senior year, she averaged 17.8 points per game, 5.3 rebounds, and four assists. With these numbers she led her squad to a 29–3 record and a conference championship.

== College career ==
After graduating from high school, Banham continued her education and basketball career at the University of Minnesota. Banham started all 36 games her freshman year, and was named Freshman All American First Team and Big Ten Freshman of the Year. During her freshman year, (2011–2012) she averaged 16.1 points per game which ranked her 97th in the nation. Her sophomore year (2012–2013) she averaged 20.7 points per game which was good enough for second-leading sophomore scorer in NCAA Division I. As a Junior (2013–2014) Banham averaged 22.1 points, 3.7 rebounds, and 3.9 assists per game. At the start of her senior season (2014–2015) Banham had only played 10 games before she suffered a season ending ACL injury. Before she tore her ACL, Banham was on ESPN's top 5 players to watch in the upcoming season. She later received a medical hardship waiver so she could play in the 2015–2016 season. When she returned to the court in the 2015–2016 season for her senior year, she had an outstanding season. Banham was named Big Ten Player of the Year and was a John R. Wooden Award finalist. Despite her time off because of her injury, Banham came back to become the Gophers all-time leading scorer and tied an NCAA record with a 60-point game against Northwestern on February 7, 2016. Banham ended her college career on a high note, becoming the sixth-leading scorer in NCAA Division I women's history and the Big Ten Conference's all-time scoring leader at the end of her college career with 3,093 points. (As of the end of the 2017–18 season, she is now eighth on the career scoring list, having since been surpassed by Washington's Kelsey Plum (2013–17), and current Big Ten career and D-I all-time scoring leader, Iowa Hawkeye Caitlin Clark.) Banham's senior year was not only one of the most memorable seasons in Gopher basketball history, but NCAA basketball history as well.

== Professional career ==
=== WNBA ===
==== Connecticut Sun (2016–2019) ====
Banham was selected 4th overall by the Connecticut Sun in the 2016 WNBA draft. During her rookie season with the Sun, Banham played in 15 games and averaged 10.9 minutes, 3.7 points, 1 assist, 1 rebound, while shooting 41% from the field and 35% from 3-point distance. Ultimately her rookie year was cut short after she tore her MCL and had micro fracture surgery on July 10. Banham's best year with the Sun came in 2018 when she averaged a career high 5.2 points. During the rest of her time in Connecticut, she did not get much playing time as she only averaged 11.4 minutes, 4 points, 1 assist and 1 rebound a game in her first four seasons with the Sun.

==== Minnesota Lynx (2020–2023) ====
On February 25, 2020, Banham was acquired by the Minnesota Lynx in a sign and trade deal that sent a 2021 2nd Round Pick to the Sun. During the 2020 Bubble Season in Bradenton, she showed some improvements averaging multiple career highs – 17.4 minutes, 6.9 points, 2.4 assists and 1.3 rebounds a game. She had her best game as a professional against the Indiana Fever on September 12, when she scored a career high 29 points and 10 assists, while making 7 3-pointers.

The 2021 season saw a change for Banham as her role decreased as the team signed Kayla McBride, Natalie Achonwa & Aerial Powers during the offseason. On June 29, Banham was waived from the Lynx in order to clear some salary cap space for Minnesota. After clearing waivers, the Lynx re-signed Banham to a rest of season deal on July 5 – allowing her to re-join the team.

==== Connecticut Sun (2024) ====
Banham returned to the Sun in February 2024, signing a two year deal with the team. Banham set an WNBA record with 8 three pointers off the bench on July 14, 2024.

==== Chicago Sky (2024–present) ====
On July 17, 2024, Banham was traded to the Chicago Sky alongside Moriah Jefferson, a 2025 1st round pick and the rights to swap 2026 first round picks, in exchange for Marina Mabrey and a 2025 2nd round pick from the Chicago Sky.

=== Unrivaled ===
On November 5, 2025, it was announced that Banham had been drafted by Lunar Owls BC for the 2026 Unrivaled season.

== Career statistics ==
Legend
GP	Games played	GS	Games started	MPG	Minutes per game	RPG	Rebounds per game
APG	Assists per game	SPG	Steals per game	BPG	Blocks per game	PPG	Points per game
TO	Turnovers per game	FG%	Field-goal percentage	3P%	3-point field-goal percentage	FT%	Free-throw percentage
**Bold**	Career best	°	League leader

=== WNBA ===
==== Regular season ====
Stats current through end of 2026 regular season

WNBA regular season statistics
Year	Team	GP	GS	MPG	FG%	3P%	FT%	RPG	APG	SPG	BPG	TO	PPG
2016	Connecticut	15	0	10.9	.408	.351	.667	0.7	0.9	0.5	0.1	0.5	3.7
2017	Connecticut	30	0	9.4	.327	.281	.800	1.1	0.7	0.1	0.0	**0.4**	3.3
2018	Connecticut	33	5	12.8	.414	.370	.868	0.9	1.5	0.5	0.1	0.5	5.2
2019	Connecticut	29	0	12.2	.322	.306	.692	1.0	0.9	0.3	0.1	0.9	3.6
2020	Minnesota	20	1	17.0	**.462**	**.472**	.800	1.3	2.4	0.5	0.1	1.0	6.9
2021	Minnesota	27	0	12.6	.395	.373	.625	1.2	1.6	0.3	0.1	0.9	5.0
2022	Minnesota	36	5	17.5	.430	.383	.800	1.3	2.3	0.3	0.1	1.3	7.9
2023	Minnesota	32	1	13.6	.370	.402	.786	1.0	1.7	0.3	0.1	1.1	5.5
2024	Connecticut	21	0	12.9	.358	.348	**.900**	1.2	0.7	0.4	0.2	0.5	4.8
2024	Chicago	16	9	19.8	.346	.382	.700	**1.8**	1.6	0.4	0.1	0.6	6.9
2025	Chicago	**44**	**33**	**24.6**	.382	.357	.881	1.7	**2.7**	**0.6**	0.3	1.6	**9.0**
2026	Chicago	40	2	17.3	.365	.324	.789	1.3	1.4	0.3	**0.8**	1.3	5.0
**Career**	11 years, 3 teams	343	56	15.1	.383	.362	.816	1.1	1.2	0.4	0.1	0.9	5.7

==== Playoffs ====
WNBA playoff statistics
Year	Team	GP	GS	MPG	FG%	3P%	FT%	RPG	APG	SPG	BPG	TO	PPG
2017	Connecticut	1	0	2.0	**1.000**	**1.000**	.000	0.0	0.0	0.0	0.0	**0.0**	3.0
2018	Connecticut	1	0	9.0	.250	**1.000**	.000	1.0	2.0	**1.0**	**1.0**	**0.0**	3.0
2019	Connecticut	**4**	0	6.0	.375	.600	**1.000**	0.8	0.0	0.0	0.3	0.3	2.8
2020	Minnesota	**4**	0	18.8	.310	.333	**1.000**	1.5	1.8	0.0	0.3	1.3	**5.8**
2021	Minnesota	1	0	5.0	.000	.000	**1.000**	1.0	0.9	0.1	0.3	0.7	2.0
2023	Minnesota	3	0	**19.7**	.316	.231	.000	**1.7**	**3.0**	**1.0**	0.7	1.7	5.0
**Career**	6 years, 2 teams	14	0	12.4	.317	.375	1.000	1.1	1.4	0.3	0.4	0.9	4.1

=== College ===
NCAA statistics
Year	Team	GP	GS	MPG	FG%	3P%	FT%	RPG	APG	SPG	BPG	TO	PPG
2011–12	Minnesota	**36**	**36**	33.7	.419	**.425**	.817	5.2	2.7	1.6	0.2	**3.2**	16.1
2012–13	Minnesota	32	32	35.3	.435	.335	**.895**	4.0	3.9	1.9	0.4	2.8	20.7
2013–14	Minnesota	34	34	**35.7**	.418	.421	.874	3.7	3.9	1.3	0.3	2.6	22.1
2014–15	Minnesota	10	10	28.5	.426	.405	.737	4.5	**4.6**	1.0	**0.8**	2.3	18.6
2015–16	Minnesota	32	32	33.8	**.457**	.390	.859	**5.9**	3.8	**2.0**	0.3	**3.2**	**28.6**
**Career**		144	144	34.2	.433	.394	.857	4.7	3.6	1.7	0.3	2.9	21.5

== Personal life ==
It was also announced on January 2, 2022, on social media that she and her boyfriend Andre Hollins were engaged at The Barn.

== See also ==
- List of NCAA Division I women's basketball career scoring leaders
- List of NCAA Division I women's basketball season scoring leaders
