= Samantha Prahalis =

American basketball player (born 1990)

Personal information
- Born: January 23, 1990 (age 36) Commack, New York, U.S.
- Listed height: 5 ft 7 in (1.70 m)
- Listed weight: 129 lb (59 kg)

Career information
- High school: Commack (Commack, New York)
- College: Ohio State (2008–2012)
- WNBA draft: 2012: 1st round, 6th overall pick
- Drafted by: Phoenix Mercury
- Playing career: 2012–2015
- Position: Guard

Career history
- 2012–2013: Phoenix Mercury
- 2013: New York Liberty
- 2014: Los Angeles Sparks
- 2015: CUS Cagliari

Career highlights
- WNBA All-Rookie Team (2012); Big Ten Player of the Year (2012); First-team All-American – AP (2012); All-American – USBWA (2012); 2× First-team All-Big Ten (2010, 2012); Big Ten Freshman of the Year (2009); Big Ten All-Freshman Team (2009); McDonald's All American (2008)
- Stats at Basketball Reference
Medals
Representing United States
FIBA Under-19 World Cup
Gold medal – first place	2009 Thailand	Team
FIBA Under-18 Americas Championship
Gold medal – first place	2008 Argentina	Team

Samantha Prahalis (born January 23, 1990, in Commack, New York) is an American basketball player who last played for the Los Angeles Sparks of the WNBA and currently for the Sardinian team CUS Cagliari. She went to Commack High School and played collegiately for Ohio State.

== USA Basketball ==
Prahalis was a member of the USA Women's U18 team which won the gold medal at the FIBA Americas Championship in Buenos Aires, Argentina. The event was held in July 2008, when the USA team defeated host Argentina to win the championship. Prahalis helped the team win all five games, scoring 6.2 points per game. She was also second in assists with 17.

Prahalis continued on to the USA Women's U19 team which represented the US in the 2009 U19 World's Championship, held in Bangkok, Thailand in July and August 2009. Although the USA team lost the opening game to Spain, they went on to win their next seven games to earn a rematch against Spain in the finals, and won the game 81–71 to earn the gold medal. Prahalis scored 10.7 points per game. She was the assists leader with 34 over the nine games.

== WNBA career ==
She was selected in the first round of the 2012 WNBA draft (6th overall) by the Phoenix Mercury. On July 18, 2013, Prahalis was waived by the Phoenix Mercury. On July 22, 2013, Prahalis was signed by the New York Liberty to a seven-day contract. She was released at the end of the contract. On April 4, 2014, Prahalis signed with the Atlanta Dream. She was released by the Dream on May 12, 2014. On June 11, 2014, Prahalis signed with the Los Angeles Sparks. She was released by the Sparks six days later.

== Post-WNBA career ==
Prahalis signed a one-year contract with the Romanian squad ACS Sepsi SIC in Sfântu Gheorghe for the 2013–14 season. As of February 2014, she led all scorers in the Romanian women's basketball league in points per game. More recently, she has coached the Ward Melville Patriots basketball team in East Setauket, New York.

== Career statistics ==
Legend
GP	Games played	GS	Games started	MPG	Minutes per game	RPG	Rebounds per game
APG	Assists per game	SPG	Steals per game	BPG	Blocks per game	PPG	Points per game
TO	Turnovers per game	FG%	Field-goal percentage	3P%	3-point field-goal percentage	FT%	Free-throw percentage
**Bold**	Career best	°	League leader

=== WNBA ===
WNBA regular season statistics
Year	Team	GP	GS	MPG	FG%	3P%	FT%	RPG	APG	SPG	BPG	TO	PPG
2012	Phoenix	**28**	**28**	**31.6**	35.2	**27.1**	86.8	**3.2**	**4.5**	**1.6**	**0.1**	3.0	**11.6**
2013	Phoenix	8	2	12.6	32.0	0.0	**100.0**	1.0	2.0	0.4	**0.1**	1.3	2.3
2013	New York	3	0	2.7	—	—	—	0.7	0.3	0.3	0.0	1.0	0.0
2014	Los Angeles	2	0	10.5	**50.0**	0.0	—	1.5	0.0	0.0	0.0	**0.5**	2.0
**Career**	3 years, 3 teams	41	30	24.8	35.2	25.7	87.1	2.5	3.5	1.2	0.1	2.4	8.4

=== College ===
NCAA statistics
Year	Team	GP	Points	FG%	3P%	FT%	RPG	APG	SPG	BPG	PPG
2008–09	Ohio State	35	358	34.5	25.7	78.0	2.9	5.8	1.9	0.1	10.2
2009–10	Ohio State	**36**	588	42.7	**37.2**	81.0	**3.8**	**8.0**	1.8	0.1	16.3
2010–11	Ohio State	31	451	39.5	27.0	82.6	3.5	6.9	1.6	0.0	14.5
2011–12	Ohio State	31	**613**	**43.6**	34.6	**83.8**	4.1	6.3	**2.2**	**0.2**	**19.8**
**Career**		133	2010	40.6	31.4	81.4	3.6	6.8	1.9	0.1	15.1
