= MaChelle Joseph =

American women's basketball coach (born 1970)

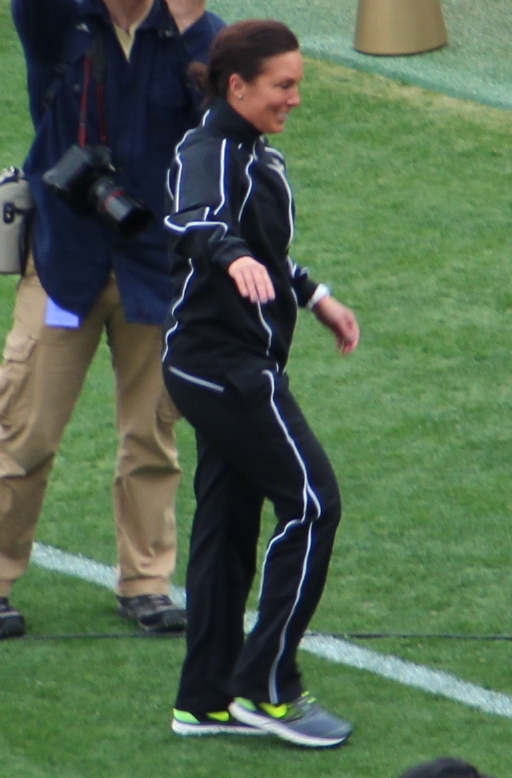
- Joseph in 2013

Biographical details
- Born: January 13, 1970 (age 56); Auburn, Indiana, U.S.

Playing career
- 1988–1992: Purdue

Coaching career (HC unless noted)
- 1992–1993: Illinois (assistant)
- 1993–1996: Purdue (assistant)
- 1996–2001: Auburn (assistant)
- 2001–2003: Georgia Tech (assistant)
- 2003–2019: Georgia Tech

Head coaching record
- Overall: 311–204 (.604)
- Tournaments: 14–11

Accomplishments and honors

Awards
- Chicago Tribune Silver Basketball (1992); All-American – Kodak, USBWA (1992); Big Ten Female Athlete of the Year (1992); Big Ten Player of the Year (1992); 3× First-team All-Big Ten (1990–1992); Big Ten Freshman of the Year (1989)
Medal record
Women's basketball
Representing United States
Jones Cup
Gold medal – first place	1992 Taipei	Team competition

MaChelle Kay Joseph (born January 13, 1970) is an American women's basketball coach, who served as the head coach for Georgia Tech from 2003 to 2019. Under Joseph, the Yellow Jackets compiled a record of 273–176. Joseph was fired on March 26, 2019, by AD Todd Stansbury and the Georgia Tech Athletic Administration after being accused of abusing and bullying players. She denies these accusations and filed suit against Georgia Tech Athletics, the Board of Regents, and 4 individuals on July 23, 2019. She claims her termination was a culmination of an unlawful campaign of retaliation against her for advocating for gender equity in athletics at Georgia Tech, and that for years, Georgia Tech has provided sub-standard resources to its women's basketball program including in facilities, marketing, travel, and funding, while providing significantly more and superior resources to its men's basketball program. The Supreme Court added the lawsuit to its docket to determine if university staff can sue over sex discrimination. Joseph served as the Head Women's Basketball Coach at GT for 16 years and amassed more wins than any other coach in GT WBB history.

== Playing career ==
Highlights of Joseph's career include:

- As a senior at DeKalb High School, she averaged a state-best 35.1 points per game, and was selected as a 1988 Indiana All-Star, Parade Magazine and Street & Smith's All-American.
- She totaled 1,633 career points at DeKalb, where she led teams to three conference and two sectional titles.
- She was named to the USA Basketball Women's Junior National Team (now called the U19 team).
- She was a four-year starter at Purdue University, where she set school and Big Ten Conference records for career points (2,405) and career assists (628). At Purdue, her teams won 96 games in four years, a 1991 Big Ten Championship and reached two NCAA Sweet 16s.
- She was named to the USA team competing in the 1992 William Jones Cup competition in Taipei, Taiwan. The team won all eight games and won the gold medal. Joseph averaged 11.0 points per game, third highest on the team.
- She was a three-time 1st team all-conference player, a 1992 Big Ten Player of the Year, and All-American, 1992 National Player of the Year.
- She was inducted into the Purdue Intercollegiate Hall of Fame on September 24, 2010, and was named one of Purdue's "Legends of Mackey" in January 2012.
- She was a member of the 2013 Silver Anniversary Team.
- She was inducted into the Indiana Basketball Hall of Fame in 2015.

== Coaching career ==
Highlights of Joseph's coaching career:

- Amassed ten 20-win seasons and seven NCAA tournament appearances, including six-straight from 2007 through 2012.
- Under Joseph's direction, 17 Yellow Jackets have garnered All-ACC accolades. Two Jackets have been named All-ACC First Team members since Joseph became the head coach in 2003. Eight freshmen have been named to the All-ACC Freshman Team.
- Coached seven Jackets that were selected in the WNBA Draft, three of these in the first round.
- Named the Georgia College Women's Coach of the Year twice in her tenure and five of her players were recognized as the Georgia College Players of the Year.

Joseph was born and grew up in Auburn, Indiana and is the fourth of 7 brothers and sisters.

== Purdue statistics ==
Legend
GP	Games played	GS	Games started	MPG	Minutes per game
FG%	Field goal percentage	3P%	3-point field goal percentage	FT%	Free throw percentage
RPG	Rebounds per game	APG	Assists per game	SPG	Steals per game
BPG	Blocks per game	PPG	Points per game	**Bold**	Career high

Year	Team	GP	Points	FG%	3P%	FT%	RPG	APG	SPG	BPG	PPG
1988–89	Purdue	**30**	567	46.0%	26.3%	68.0%	**4.4**	5.0	1.5	0.0	18.9
1989–90	Purdue	**30**	583	**47.1%**	**37.4%**	72.5%	2.4	5.1	1.2	0.1	19.4
1990–91	Purdue	29	590	46.6%	32.8%	81.7%	3.5	5.5	1.4	**0.1**	20.3
1991–92	Purdue	**30**	**665**	43.9%	31.1%	**83.2%**	4.0	**5.6**	**1.8**	0.0	**22.2**
Career	Purdue	119	2405	45.9%	32.5%	76.3%	3.6	5.3	1.5	0.0	20.2

== Head coaching record ==
Record table
Season	Team	Overall	Conference	Standing	Postseason
**Georgia Tech Yellow Jackets** (Atlantic Coast Conference) (2003–2019)
2003–04	Georgia Tech	14–15	5–11	8th	
2004–05	Georgia Tech	13–14	4–10	8th	
2005–06	Georgia Tech	14–15	2–12	11th	
2006–07	Georgia Tech	21–12	9–5	6th	NCAA Second Round
2007–08	Georgia Tech	22–10	7–7	5th	NCAA First Round
2008–09	Georgia Tech	22–10	8–6	5th	NCAA Second Round
2009–10	Georgia Tech	23–10	8–6	4th	NCAA First Round
2010–11	Georgia Tech	24–11	9–5	T–4th	NCAA Second Round
2011–12	Georgia Tech	26–9	12–4	T–3rd	NCAA Sweet Sixteen
2012–13	Georgia Tech	14–16	7–11	T–7th	
2013–14	Georgia Tech	20–12	9–7	T–5th	NCAA First Round
2014–15	Georgia Tech	19–15	7–9	T–9th	WNIT Second Round
2015–16	Georgia Tech	20–13	8–8	T–7th	WNIT Second Round
2016–17	Georgia Tech	22–15	5–11	10th	WNIT Finals
2017–18	Georgia Tech	20–14	6–10	T-9th	WNIT Third Round
2018–19	Georgia Tech	17–13	7–9	6th	
Georgia Tech:		311–204 (.604)	113–131 (.463)		
Total:		311–204 (.604)			
National champion Postseason invitational champion Conference regular season champion Conference regular season and conference tournament champion Division regular season champion Division regular season and conference tournament champion Conference tournament champion
