= Carol Ann Shudlick =

American basketball player

Personal information
- Listed height: 6 ft 0 in (1.83 m)

Career information
- High school: Apple Valley
- College: Minnesota (1990–1994)
- Position: Center

Career highlights
- Wade Trophy (1994); Chicago Tribune Silver Basketball (1994); Big Ten Player of the Year (1994); Kodak All-American (1994); First-team All-Big Ten (1993, 1994); University of Minnesota Hall of Fame; Minnesota Miss Basketball (1990)
- Stats at Basketball Reference

Carol Ann Shudlick Smith is an American former women's basketball player at the University of Minnesota. Shudlick played from 1990 through 1994, setting a number of school records, including a then-record 2,097 career points. Shudlick was the recipient of the 1994 Wade Trophy, given to the nation's best college basketball player.

Shudlick Smith was later honored by the NCAA by being included in a list of 209 student-athletes listed as "NCAA Women's Basketball's Finest." She also was inducted into the University of Minnesota's M Club, the school's Hall of Fame.

== Minnesota statistics ==
Legend
GP	Games played	GS	Games started	MPG	Minutes per game
FG%	Field goal percentage	3P%	3-point field goal percentage	FT%	Free throw percentage
RPG	Rebounds per game	APG	Assists per game	SPG	Steals per game
BPG	Blocks per game	PPG	Points per game	**Bold**	Career high

Year	Team	GP	Points	FG%	3P%	FT%	RPG	APG	SPG	BPG	PPG
1991	Minnesota	24	285	46.5%	0.0%	73.2%	5.3	1.0	1.3	0.5	11.9
1992	Minnesota	27	547	51.4%	0.0%	71.4%	**7.0**	1.4	1.1	0.5	20.3
1993	Minnesota	26	587	**53.8%**	0.0%	**77.9%**	8.3	2.3	1.8	**1.2**	22.6
1994	Minnesota	**29**	**678**	49.4%	0.0%	75.1%	6.8	**2.7**	**2.3**	1.0	**23.4**
Career		106	2097	50.8%	0.0%	74.4%	6.9	1.9	1.6	0.8	19.8
