= Taylor Mikesell =

American basketball player (born 1999)

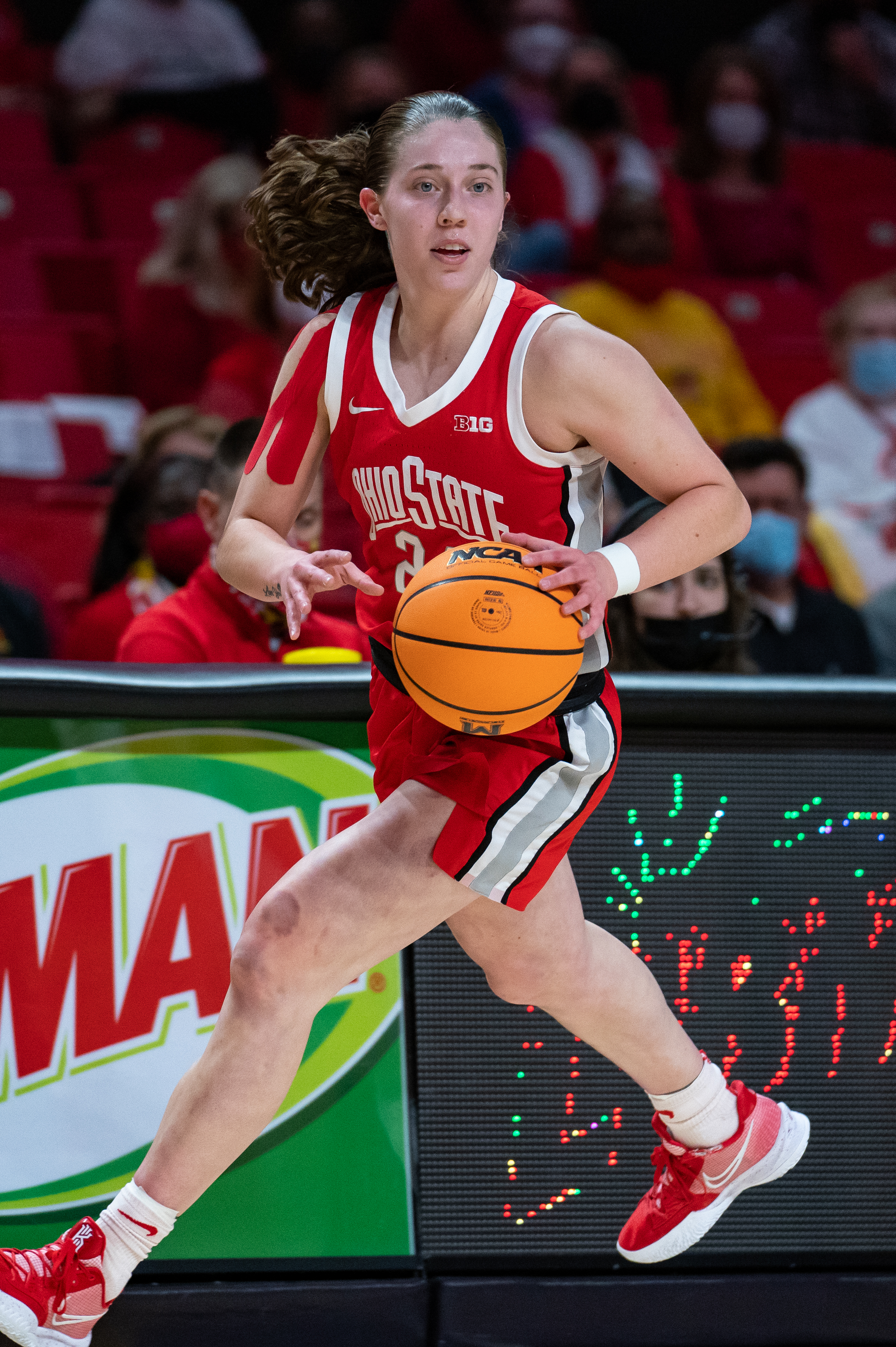
- Mikesell with Ohio State in 2022

Personal information
- Born: September 30, 1999 (age 27) Massillon, Ohio, U.S.
- Listed height: 5 ft 10 in (1.78 m)
- Listed weight: 150 lb (68 kg)

Career information
- High school: Jackson (Massillon, Ohio)
- College: Maryland (2018–2020); Oregon (2020–2021); Ohio State (2021–2023)
- WNBA draft: 2023: 2nd round, 13th overall pick
- Drafted by: Indiana Fever
- Position: Guard

Career history
- 2023: Atlanta Dream
- 2024–2025: Lointek Gernika Bizkaia
- 2025: Mainland Pouākai
- 2026: Tokomanawa Queens

Career highlights
- First-team All-Big Ten – Coaches (2022); 2× First-team All-Big Ten – Media (2019, 2022); Second-team All-Big Ten (2019); Big Ten Freshman of the Year (2019); Big Ten All-Freshman Team (2019)
- Stats at Basketball Reference
Medals
Women's basketball
Representing the United States
Pan American Games
Silver medal – second place	2019 Peru	Team
FIBA Under-17 World Cup
Bronze medal – third place	2016 Spain	Team

Taylor Ayn Mikesell (born September 30, 1999) is an American basketball player. She was drafted by the Indiana Fever in the 2023 WNBA draft and played during the 2023 season for the Atlanta Dream. She played her college basketball at Ohio State Buckeyes of the Big Ten Conference. She previously played for the Maryland Terrapins and the Oregon Ducks.

== High school career ==
Mikesell played for Jackson High School in Massillon, Ohio. As a senior, she scored 60 points, shooting 14-of-17 from three-point range, against Austintown Fitch High School. During the game, Mikesell became the all-time leading scorer in Stark County, Ohio and set the state record for three-pointers in a game. She averaged 30.7 points, 6.5 rebounds and 3.7 steals per game, leading her team to the Division I state quarterfinals. Mikesell was named Ohio High School Basketball Coaches Association Division I Player of the Year. Rated a five-star recruit by ESPN, she committed to playing college basketball for Maryland over offers from Florida State and Stanford.

== College career ==
As a freshman at Maryland, Mikesell averaged 13.4 points and 3.5 rebounds per game, and was named Big Ten Freshman of the Year. She earned first-team All-Big Ten recognition from the media and was a second-team selection by the media. Mikesell broke the school single-season record for three-pointers by a women's or men's player. As a sophomore, she averaged 11.2 points per game and earned All-Big Ten honorable mention, before transferring to Oregon, where she averaged 9.3 points as a junior. For her senior season, Mikesell transferred to Ohio State. On January 20, 2022, she scored a career-high 33 points and shot 11-of-13 from the field in a 95–89 win over Maryland. Mikesell averaged 18.6 points per game as a senior, earning first-team All-Big Ten honors. She led the Big Ten and ranked second in the NCAA Division I in three-point percentage (47.5). She opted to return for a fifth season of eligibility.

== Professional career ==
=== Indiana Fever ===
Mikesell was selected in the second round, and 13th overall, in the 2023 WNBA draft by the Indiana Fever. Mikesell competed in training camp, but was ultimately waived by the Fever and did not make the roster.

=== Atlanta Dream ===
Mikesell signed a contract with the Atlanta Dream on June 5, 2023. She appeared in six games for the Dream, scoring 9 points against the Dallas Wings on June 20, 2023. She was waived on July 3, 2023.

=== Los Angeles Sparks ===
On February 2, 2024 Mikesell was signed to a training camp contract with the Los Angeles Sparks but was waived on May 6, 2024.

=== Lointek Gernika Bizkaia ===
In June 2024, Mikesell signed with Lointek Gernika Bizkaia of the Liga Femenina de Baloncesto for the 2024–25 season.

=== Mainland Pouākai ===
In July 2025, Mikesell joined Mainland Pouākai for the 2025 Tauihi Basketball Aotearoa season.

=== Tokomanawa Queens ===
In 2026, Mikesell was playing for the Tokomanawa Queens in Tauihi Basketball Aotearoa.

== Career statistics ==
Legend
GP	Games played	GS	Games started	MPG	Minutes per game	RPG	Rebounds per game
APG	Assists per game	SPG	Steals per game	BPG	Blocks per game	PPG	Points per game
TO	Turnovers per game	FG%	Field-goal percentage	3P%	3-point field-goal percentage	FT%	Free-throw percentage
**Bold**	Career best	°	League leader

=== College ===
Year	Team	GP	GS	MPG	FG%	3P%	FT%	RPG	APG	SPG	BPG	TO	PPG
2018–19	Maryland	34	34	34.7	42.2	41.1	86.0	3.5	**3.3**	0.8	0.2	2.6	13.4
2019–20	Maryland	32	32	29.8	40.5	42.5	91.3	2.5	2.3	1.4	0.2	1.9	11.2
2020–21	Oregon	24	20	24.8	40.4	33.3	**92.3**	2.4	1.8	0.5	0.1	**1.3**	9.3
2021–22	Ohio State	32	32	34.5	**48.2**	**47.5**	90.2	**3.5**	2.0	0.9	0.3	1.6	**18.6**
2022–23	Ohio State	**36**	**36**	**35.5**	43.0	41.4	85.9	2.8	2.3	**1.4**	0.3	2.1	17.2
**Career**		158	154	32.3	43.4	42.0	88.3	3.0	2.4	1.0	0.2	1.9	14.3
Statistics retrieved from Sports-Reference.

=== WNBA career statistics ===
Legend
GP	Games played	GS	Games started	MPG	Minutes per game	RPG	Rebounds per game
APG	Assists per game	SPG	Steals per game	BPG	Blocks per game	PPG	Points per game
TO	Turnovers per game	FG%	Field-goal percentage	3P%	3-point field-goal percentage	FT%	Free-throw percentage
**Bold**	Career best	°	League leader

==== WNBA regular season ====
Year	Team	GP	GS	MPG	FG%	3P%	FT%	RPG	APG	SPG	BPG	TO	PPG
2023	Atlanta	6	0	4.8	.500	.429	1.00	0.3	0.3	0.0	0.0	0.2	2.8
Career	1 year, 1 team	6	0	4.8	.500	.429	1.00	0.3	0.3	0.0	0.0	0.2	2.8

== National team career ==
Mikesell played for the United States at the 2016 FIBA Under-17 World Championship for Women in Spain. She averaged five points per game and helped her team win a bronze medal. Mikesell was selected to represent the United States at the 2019 Pan American Games in Peru. She averaged five points per game as her team won the silver medal.

== See also ==
- List of NCAA Division I women's basketball career 3-point scoring leaders
