= Ohio State Buckeyes women's basketball =

Women's basketball team of Ohio State University

2026–27 Ohio State Buckeyes women's basketball team
- University: Ohio State University
- Head coach: Kevin McGuff (14th season)
- Location: Columbus, Ohio
- Arena: Value City Arena (capacity: 18,809)
- Conference: Big Ten
- Nickname: Buckeyes
- Colors: Scarlet and gray

NCAA Division I tournament runner-up
- 1993
Other NCAA Division I tournament results
Final Four	1993
Elite Eight	1985, 1987, 1993, 2023
Sweet Sixteen	1985, 1986, 1987, 1988, 1989, 1993, 2005, 2009, 2011, 2016, 2017*, 2022, 2023
Appearances	1984, 1985, 1986, 1987, 1988, 1989, 1990, 1993, 1996, 1999, 2003, 2004, 2005, 2006, 2007, 2008, 2009, 2010, 2011, 2012, 2015, 2016, 2017*, 2018*, 2022, 2023, 2024, 2025, 2026

AIAW tournament quarterfinals
- 1975
Other AIAW tournament results
Appearances	1975, 1978

Conference tournament champions
- 2006, 2009, 2010, 2011, 2018*

Conference regular-season champions
- 1983, 1984, 1985, 1986, 1987, 1989, 1993, 2005, 2006, 2007, 2008, 2009, 2010, 2017*, 2018*, 2022, 2024

Uniforms
Home	Away
- * vacated by NCAA

The Ohio State women's basketball team represents Ohio State University and plays its home games in the Value City Arena at the Jerome Schottenstein Center, which they moved into in 1998. Prior to 1998, they played at St. John Arena.

They have won 14 Big Ten titles (two additional championships have been vacated by the NCAA), which is the most in the conference and have 23 appearances in the NCAA Tournament, the most recent being in 2023 (two other appearances have been vacated).

In 1993, they lost to Sheryl Swoopes and Texas Tech 84–82 for the national title. They captured the Women's National Invitation Tournament (WNIT) title in 2001, beating the New Mexico Lobos 62–61.

Notable alumni include former All-Americans Katie Smith and Jessica Davenport.
The Buckeyes are currently coached by fourteenth-year Kevin McGuff, who was previously the head coach at the University of Washington.

== Year by year results ==
Season	Team	Overall	Conference	Standing	Postseason	Coaches' poll	AP poll
Phyllis J. Bailey (Independent) (1965–1970)
1965–66	Phyllis J. Bailey	3–7	–				
1966–67	Phyllis J. Bailey	5–3	–				
1967–68	Phyllis J. Bailey	5–1	–				
1968–69	Phyllis J. Bailey	8–2	–		CIAW First Round		
1969–70	Phyllis J. Bailey	7–0	–				
Phyllis J. Bailey:		28–13	–				
Mary Combs (Independent) (1970–1972)
1970–71	Mary Combs	4–2	–				
1971–72	Mary Combs	10–4	–		MAIAW		
Mary Combs:		14–6	–				
Debbie Wilson (Independent) (1972–1980)
1972–73	Debbie Wilson	15–1	–		MAIAW		
1973–74	Debbie Wilson	18–2	–		MAIAW		
1974–75	Debbie Wilson	19–5	–		AIAW First Round		
1975–76	Debbie Wilson	26–6	–		MAIAW		
1976–77	Debbie Wilson	21–7	–		MAIAW		
1977–78	Debbie Wilson	23–8	–		AIAW First Round		16
1978–79	Debbie Wilson	19–11	–		MAIAW		
1979–80	Debbie Wilson	16–18	–		MAIAW		
Debbie Wilson:		157–58	–				
Tara VanDerveer (Independent, Big Ten) (1980–1985)
1980–81	Tara VanDerveer	17–15	–		MAIAW		
Big Ten Conference
1981–82	Tara VanDerveer	20–7	3–0	1st	NCAA First Round		
1982–83	Tara VanDerveer	23–5	15–3	T-1st			
1983–84	Tara VanDerveer	22–7	17–1	1st	NCAA First Round		19
1984–85	Tara VanDerveer	28–3	18–0	1st	NCAA Elite Eight		7
Tara VanDerveer:		110–37	53–4				
Nancy Darsch (Big Ten) (1985–1997)
1985–86	Nancy Darsch	23–7	16–2	1st	NCAA Sweet Sixteen	17	12
1986–87	Nancy Darsch	26–5	17–1	T-1st	NCAA Elite Eight	8	10
1987–88	Nancy Darsch	25–5	16–2	2nd	NCAA Sweet Sixteen	9	6
1988–89	Nancy Darsch	24–6	16–2	T-1st	NCAA Sweet Sixteen	9	14
1989–90	Nancy Darsch	18–12	11–7	T-4th	NCAA Second Round (Play-In)		
1990–91	Nancy Darsch	11–17	8–10	T-5th			
1991–92	Nancy Darsch	15–13	9–9	5th			
1992–93	Nancy Darsch	28–4	16–2	T-1st	NCAA Runner-up	2	3
1993–94	Nancy Darsch	14–14	7–11	T-7th			
1994–95	Nancy Darsch	17–13	7–9	T-7th			
1995–96	Nancy Darsch	21–13	8–8	T-6th	NCAA Second Round		
1996–97	Nancy Darsch	12–16	3–13	10th			
Nancy Darsch:		234–125	134–76				
Beth Burns (Big Ten) (1997–2002)
1997–98	Beth Burns	15–12	7–9	8th			
1998–99	Beth Burns	17–12	9–7	4th	NCAA First Round		
1999–2000	Beth Burns	13–15	5–11	T-8th			
2000–01	Beth Burns	22–11	6–10	T-8th	WNIT Champions		
2001–02	Beth Burns	14–15	8–8	T-5th			
Beth Burns:		81–65	35–45				
Jim Foster (Big Ten) (2002–2013)
2002–03	Jim Foster	22–10	10–6	T-4th	NCAA Second Round		20
2003–04	Jim Foster	21–10	11–5	3rd	NCAA Second Round		21
2004–05	Jim Foster	30–5	14–2	T-1st	NCAA Sweet Sixteen	9	8
2005–06	Jim Foster	29–3	15–1	1st	NCAA Second Round	10	2
2006–07	Jim Foster	28–4	15–1	1st	NCAA First Round	18	8
2007–08	Jim Foster	22–9	13–5	T-1st	NCAA First Round		25
2008–09	Jim Foster	29–6	15–3	1st	NCAA Sweet Sixteen	9	10
2009–10	Jim Foster	31–5	15–3	1st	NCAA Second Round	15	8
2010–11	Jim Foster	24–10	10–6	T-3rd	NCAA Sweet Sixteen	17	18
2011–12	Jim Foster	25–7	11–5	T-2nd	NCAA First Round	22	16
2012–13	Jim Foster	18–13	7–9	T-8th			
Jim Foster:		279–82	136–46				
Kevin McGuff (Big Ten) (2013–present)
2013–14	Kevin McGuff	17–18	5–11	T-8th			
2014–15	Kevin McGuff	24–11	13–5	3rd	NCAA Second Round	23	23
2015–16	Kevin McGuff	26–8	15–3	2nd	NCAA Sweet Sixteen	10	9
2016–17	Kevin McGuff	28–7^{[Note A]}	15–1^{[Note A]}	T-1st^{[Note A]}	NCAA Sweet Sixteen^{[Note A]}	10	9
2017–18	Kevin McGuff	28–7^{[Note B]}	13–3^{[Note B]}	1st^{[Note B]}	NCAA Second Round^{[Note B]}	15	10
2018–19	Kevin McGuff	14–15^{[Note C]}	10–8^{[Note C]}	5th^{[Note C]}	WNIT First Round^{[Note C]}		
2019–20	Kevin McGuff	21–12	11–7	T-5th	No postseason held		
2020–21	Kevin McGuff	13–7	9–7	7th	Self-imposed postseason ban		22
2021–22	Kevin McGuff	25–7	14–4	T-1st	NCAA Sweet Sixteen	13	14
2022–23	Kevin McGuff	28–8	12–6	4th	NCAA Elite Eight	12	12
2023–24	Kevin McGuff	26–6	16–2	1st	NCAA Second Round		
2024–25	Kevin McGuff	26–7	13–5	T–3rd	NCAA Second Round		
2025–26	Kevin McGuff	27–8	13–5	T–4th	NCAA Second Round		
2026–27	Kevin McGuff	1–0	0–0				
Kevin McGuff:		304–121^{[Note D]}	159–67^{[Note D]}				
Total:		1,154–501					
National champion Postseason invitational champion Conference regular season champion Conference regular season and conference tournament champion Division regular season champion Division regular season and conference tournament champion Conference tournament champion

^A 11 games vacated by the NCAA, as well as conference regular season championship (overall record of 28–7, conference record of 15–1). Adjusted record is 18–6 and 8–1 in conference.
^B 29 games vacated by the NCAA, as well as conference regular season and tournament championships (overall record of 28–7, conference record of 13–3). Adjusted record is 0–6 and 0–3 in conference.
^C 15 games vacated by the NCAA (overall record of 14–15, conference record of 10–8). Adjusted record is 0–14 and 0–8 in conference.
^D McGuff's unofficial record is 224–100 at Ohio State; his adjusted record is 172–97 and 87–55 in conference.

== NCAA tournament results ==
Ohio State has reached the NCAA tournament 29 times. They have a record of 37–29, although the 2017 and 2018 appearances were later vacated due to violations.

Year	Seed	Round	Opponent	Result
1984	#5	First Round	#4 Ole Miss	L 55–77
1985	#2	First Round; Sweet Sixteen; Elite Eight	#7 Holy Cross #3 Penn State #1 Old Dominion	W 102–60; W 81–78; L 68–72
1986	#3	Second Round; Sweet Sixteen	#6 Maryland #2 LSU	W 87–71; L 80–81
1987	#2	Second Round; Sweet Sixteen; Elite Eight	#10 Oregon #3 USC #1 Long Beach State	W 76–62; W 74–63; L 82–102
1988	#3	Second Round; Sweet Sixteen	#6 Syracuse #2 Maryland	W 116–75; L 66–81
1989	#3	Second Round; Sweet Sixteen	#6 James Madison #2 Long Beach State	W 81–66; L 83–89
1990	#6	First Round; Second Round	#11 Southern Illinois #3 Texas	W 73–61; L 66–95
1993	#1	Second Round; Sweet Sixteen; Elite Eight; Final Four; Title Game	#9 Rutgers #4 Western Kentucky #2 Virginia #2 Iowa #2 Texas Tech	W 91–60; W 86–73; W 75–73; W 73–72 (OT); L 82–84
1996	#9	First Round; Second Round	#8 Memphis #1 Tennessee	W 97–75; L 65–97
1999	#9	First Round	#8 Boston College	L 59–72
2003	#4	First Round; Second Round	#13 Weber State #5 Louisiana Tech	W 66–44; L 61–74
2004	#4	First Round; Second Round	#11 West Virginia #3 Boston College	W 73–67; L 48–63
2005	#2	First Round; Second Round; Sweet Sixteen	#15 Holy Cross #7 Maryland #3 Rutgers	W 86–45; W 75–65; L 58–64
2006	#1	First Round; Second Round	#16 Oakland #8 Boston College	W 68–45; L 69–79
2007	#4	First Round	#13 Marist	L 63–67
2008	#6	First Round	#11 Florida State	L 49–60
2009	#3	First Round; Second Round; Sweet Sixteen	#14 Sacred Heart #11 Mississippi State #2 Stanford	W 77–63; W 64–58; L 66–84
2010	#2	First Round; Second Round	#15 St. Francis (PA) #7 Mississippi State	W 93–59; L 67–87
2011	#4	First Round; Second Round; Sweet Sixteen	#13 UCF #5 Georgia Tech #1 Tennessee	W 80–69; W 67–60; L 75–85
2012	#8	First Round	#9 Florida	L 65–70
2015	#5	First Round; Second Round	#12 James Madison #4 North Carolina	W 90–80; L 84–86
2016	#3	First Round; Second Round; Sweet Sixteen	#14 Buffalo #6 West Virginia #7 Tennessee	W 88–69; W 88–81; L 62–78
2017*	#5	First Round; Second Round; Sweet Sixteen	#12 Western Kentucky #4 Kentucky #1 Notre Dame	W 70–63; W 82–68; L 76–99
2018*	#3	First Round; Second Round	#14 George Washington #11 Central Michigan	W 87–45; L 78–95
2022	#6	First Round; Second Round; Sweet Sixteen	#11 Missouri State #3 LSU #2 Texas	W 63–56; W 79–64; L 63–66
2023	#3	First Round; Second Round; Sweet Sixteen; Elite Eight	#14 James Madison #6 North Carolina #2 UConn #1 Virginia Tech	W 80–66; W 71–69; W 73–61; L 74–84
2024	#2	First Round; Second Round	#15 Maine #7 Duke	W 80–57; L 63–75
2025	#4	First Round; Second Round	#13 Montana State #5 Tennessee	W 71–51; L 67–82
2026	#3	First Round; Second Round	#14 Howard #6 Notre Dame	W 75–54; L 73–83

== Awards and honors ==
Consensus All-American selections

- Frani Washington (1979)
- Tracy Hall (1987–1988)
- Nikita Lowry (1989)
- Katie Smith (1993, 1996)
- Jessica Davenport (2005–2007)
- Jantel Lavender (2010–2011)
- Samantha Prahalis (2012)
- Kelsey Mitchell (2015–2018)

First-Team All-Big Ten

- Yvette Angel (1983, 1985)
- Carla Chapman (1984)
- Francine Lewis (1984–1985)
- Tracy Hall (1986–1988)
- |Nikita Lowry (1988–1989)
- Lisa Cline (1989)
- Averrill Roberts (1992–1993)
- Nikki Keyton (1993)
- Katie Smith (1994–1996)
- Marrita Porter (1998–1999)
- Jessica Davenport (2005–2007)
- Jantel Lavender (2008–2011)
- Samantha Prahalis (2010, 2012)
- Tayler Hill (2012–2013)
- Ameryst Alston (2015–2016)
- Kelsey Mitchell (2015–2018)
- Stephanie Mavunga (2018)
- Dorka Juhász (2020–2021)
- Taylor Mikesell (2022–2023)
- Jacy Sheldon (2022, 2024)
- Taylor Mikesell (2023)
- Cotie McMahon (2024–2025)
- Jaloni Cambridge (2025)

Big Ten Player of the Year

- Tracey Hall (1986–1987)
- Lisa Cline (1989)
- Katie Smith (1996)
- Jessica Davenport (2005–2007)
- |Jantel Lavender (2008–2011)
- Samantha Prahalis (2012)
- Kelsey Mitchell (2015, 2017–2018)

Big Ten Freshman of the Year

- Tracey Hall (1985)
- Lisa Cline (1986)
- Averrill Roberts (1990)
- Katie Smith (1993)
- LaToya Turner (2000)
- Jessica Davenport (2004)
- Jantel Lavender (2008)
- Samantha Prahalis (2009)
- Kelsey Mitchell (2015)
- Cotie McMahon (2023)
- Jaloni Cambridge (2025)
