= Anucha Browne Sanders =

American basketball player and executive

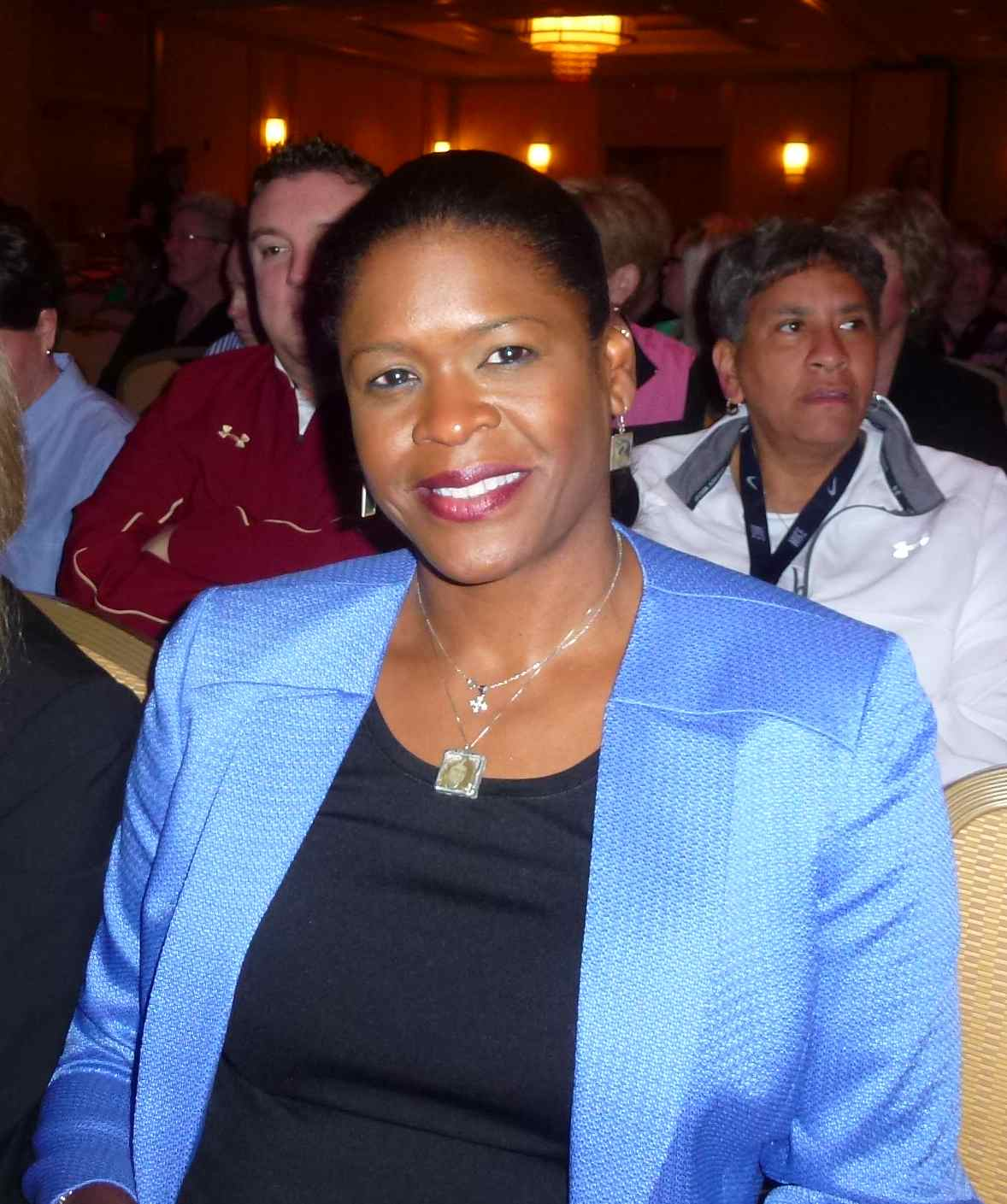
- Browne Sanders in 2013

Career highlights
- 2× Big Ten Player of the Year (1984, 1985); Kodak All-American (1985)
Medals
Women's basketball
Representing the United States
Jones Cup
Gold medal – first place	1985 Taipei	Team competition

Anucha Browne is an American former women's basketball player and a former executive for the New York Knicks team of the NBA. She is also known for winning a sexual harassment lawsuit that she filed against the former New York Knicks general manager Isiah Thomas and Madison Square Garden.

== Playing career ==
In 1982, Browne enrolled at Northwestern, where she was a star on the school's women's basketball team. Sanders was selected to the all-Big Ten team three times, and was named Big Ten Player of the Year twice; she also holds the all-time conference records for scoring (2,307 points) and rebounds (951), and in 1985 led all Division I women's basketball players nationwide in scoring average with 30.5 points per game. According to an article published by Northwestern University, Sanders may be "pound for pound, one of the most accomplished athletes in the school's history".

Browne graduated from Northwestern in 1985 with a degree in communications, and was selected to the school's athletic Hall of Fame in 1993. She later would complete a master's degree in Marketing Communication at Florida State University.

After graduation, Browne continued to participate in organized basketball to some extent. She was briefly on the United States Women's National team, and participated in several organized exhibition tournaments. However, an attempt at a pro career in the WNBA (which did not start operations for more than a decade after her graduation) did not pan out; she applied for that league's draft and was not selected.

=== Northwestern University statistics ===
Legend
GP	Games played	GS	Games started	MPG	Minutes per game
FG%	Field goal percentage	3P%	3-point field goal percentage	FT%	Free throw percentage
RPG	Rebounds per game	APG	Assists per game	SPG	Steals per game
BPG	Blocks per game	PPG	Points per game	**Bold**	Career high

Year	Team	GP	Points	FG%	FT%	RPG	APG	PPG
1982	Northwestern	**29**	346	51.1%	63.8%	6.0	NA	11.9
1983	Northwestern	27	552	**55.8%**	64.7%	9.2	NA	20.4
1984	Northwestern	26	554	45.9%	65.1%	**10.4**	NA	21.3
1985	Northwestern	28	**855**	51.1%	**68.1%**	9.2	**1.1**	**30.5**
Career		110	2307	50.8%	65.9%	8.7	0.3	21.0

== USA Basketball ==
Browne was named to the team representing the US at the 1985 William Jones Cup competition in Taipei, Taiwan. After losing an early game to Sweden, Team USA won the next six games, including a two-point victory in the final game against Japan, to secure the championship. She scored five points at the event.

== Post basketball career ==
After her collegiate career ended, Browne Sanders worked for eleven years for IBM in several roles; her final role was as a program manager in the company's Worldwide Sports Office. As program manager, she oversaw IBM's marketing sports-related marketing activities, including at the Olympic Games in 1996, 1998, and 2000.

In 2000, Browne Sanders was hired by the New York Knicks as a marketing executive.

In 2002, she was promoted to the position of senior vice president of marketing and business operations by the franchise, making her one of the most powerful female black executives in pro sports in the United States. She held that role for nearly four years, until January 2006, when she was fired.

== Honors and awards ==
- Sports Business Journal 's "40 under 40" list, given to up-and-coming young sports executives.
- 1993: Inducted into the Northwestern Athletics Hall of Fame
- Northwestern University's Athlete of the Decade for the 1980s.

== Personal life ==
Sanders graduated from Saint Saviour High School in Brooklyn, New York. Sanders is divorced with three children. She is currently the Chief Impact Officer at Tides after being the vice president of women's basketball championships for the NCAA, and serving as senior associate athletics director for marketing and senior woman administrator at the University at Buffalo.

== Sexual harassment lawsuit ==
Several days after her firing in January 2006, Browne Sanders filed a sexual harassment lawsuit against New York Knicks general manager Isiah Thomas and Madison Square Garden (the corporation which owns the Knicks and several other New York sports franchises). The suit claimed that Thomas sexually harassed her, starting with his hiring by the Knicks in December 2003. It further claimed that her firing was in retaliation for her complaints about the alleged harassment. The lawsuit alleged that after Browne Sanders' lawyer told Madison Square Garden of her complaint, Madison Square Garden forced her out of work while it investigated the situation. At the conclusion of the investigation, Madison Square Garden fired Browne Sanders, allegedly because of "an inability to fulfill professional responsibilities."

The lawsuit sought unspecified damages, and reinstatement to her former position with the Knicks.

In August 2006, the lawsuit was expanded to include Knicks and Cablevision owner James Dolan as a defendant.

On October 2, 2007, the jury returned a verdict finding Thomas and Madison Square Garden liable for sexual harassment. The jury also levied $11.6 million in punitive damages against MSG, but not Thomas. The defendants indicated that they would appeal the verdict. However, on December 10, 2007, the Knicks announced that the lawsuit had been settled for an unspecified amount, later revealed to be $11.5 million.
