= Northwestern Wildcats women's basketball =

2026–27 Northwestern Wildcats women's basketball team
- University: Northwestern University
- Head coach: Carla Berube (1st season)
- Location: Evanston, Illinois
- Arena: Welsh-Ryan Arena (capacity: 7,039)
- Conference: Big Ten
- Nickname: Wildcats
- Colors: Purple and white
- Student section: Wildside

NCAA Division I tournament second round
- 1980, 1987, 1991, 1993, 2021

NCAA Division I tournament appearances
- 1982, 1987, 1990, 1991, 1993, 1997, 2015, 2021

AIAW tournament appearances
- 1979, 1980, 1981

Conference regular-season champions
- 1990, 2020

Uniforms
Home	Away

The Northwestern Wildcats women's basketball team is the intercollegiate women's basketball program representing Northwestern University. The school competes in the Big Ten Conference in Division I of the National Collegiate Athletic Association (NCAA). The Wildcats play home basketball games at Welsh-Ryan Arena on the university campus in Evanston, Illinois, but played the 2017–18 season at Beardsley Gym on the nearby campus of Evanston Township High School during renovations to Welsh–Ryan Arena.

== History ==
=== Early years (1975–1984) ===
The Wildcats began play in women's basketball in 1975, with Mary DiStanislao as the first head coach, who coached for five seasons, with the final two resulting in appearances in the AIAW Tournament. In 1980, Annette Lynch took over as head coach, leading the team to postseason appearances (AIAW and NCAA) in her first two seasons, with the latter (1981) being the first season in the Big Ten Conference.

=== Don Perrelli era (1985–1999) ===
In 1984, Don Perrelli became head coach of the Wildcats. In his 15-year tenure, he led the team to 5 appearances in the NCAA Tournament, a Big Ten title in 1990 (with a 24–5 record, 15–3 conference record), and a NWIT appearance. Perrelli retired after the 1998–99 season.

=== Decline (1999–2008) ===
June Olkowski took over, coaching Northwestern for five seasons, but she was fired after finishing 10th or worse each time, never winning more than three conference games. Beth Combs was hired to coach the Wildcats in 2004, but she was fired after four seasons, highlighted with winning only 7 conference games in 4 years and never finishing higher than 10th place.

=== Joe McKeown era (2008–2026) ===
Joe McKeown was hired for the 2008 season. After a 10th-place finish in his first season, they finished tied for 8th in the conference (good enough to qualify for the WNIT) the following season, their highest finish since the 1998 season. After appearing in the WNIT twice in the following four seasons, the Wildcats returned to the NCAA Women's Division I Basketball Tournament in 2015, their first appearance since 1997, in a season where they had their highest finish in the conference (1994) since 1996. McKeown retired following the 2025–26 season, after 40 years as a head coach.

=== Carla Berube era (2026–present) ===
On March 25, 2026, Carla Berube was named the seventh head coach in program history.

== All-Time Statistical Leaders ==
=== Career leaders ===
- Points scored: 2,307 (Anucha Browne – 1982–85)
- Assists: 892 (Nancy Kennelly – 1989–93)
- Rebounds: 1183 (Nia Coffey – 2013–17)
- Steals: 236 (Moira Kennelly – 1991–94)
- Blocks: 357 (Amy Jaeschke – 2007–2011)

=== Single season leaders ===
- Points scored: 855 (Anucha Browne – 1985)
- Assists: 252 (Nancy Kennelly – 1991 and 1993)
- Rebounds: 404 (Pallas Kunaiyi-Akpannah – 2018–19)
- Steals: 95 (Ashley Deary – 2014–15)
- Blocks: 106 (Amy Jaeschke – 2009–10)

=== Single game leaders ===
- Points scored: 45 (Anucha Browne vs. St. John's – 1984)
- Assists: 16 (Nancy Kennelly vs. Eastern Illinois – 1993)
- Rebounds: 26 (Julie Calahan vs. Indiana – 1981)
- Steals: 11 (Moira Kennelly vs. UW-Milwaukee – 1993)
- Blocks: 10 (Amy Jaeschke vs. Chicago State – 2010)

== Big Ten Medal of Honor ==
- 1982 – Patience Vanderbush
- 1985 – Anucha Browne
- 1992 – Michele Savage
- 1993 – Nancy Kennelly
- 1997 – Michele Ratay
- 1999 – Megan Chawansky

== Coaching history ==
Coach	Years	Record	Conference; Record	Conference; Titles
Mary DiStanislao	1975–1980	75–42	0–0	
Annette Lynch	1980–1984	89–30	32–15	
Don Perrelli	1984–1999	251–181	135–126	1
June Olkowski	1999–2004	31–108	7–73	
Beth Combs	2004–2008	24–95	7–59	
Joe McKeown	2008–2025	233-186	93–128	1
Totals		694–642	275–401	2

== Postseason ==
=== NCAA Division I Women's Basketball tournament ===
The Wildcats have appeared in the NCAA Division I women's basketball tournament eight times. They have a record of 4–7.

Year	Round	Opponent	Result
1982	First Round	North Carolina State	L 73–71
1987	First Round; Second Round	Kansas State; Louisiana Tech	W 62–61 (OT); L 82–60
1990	First Round	South Carolina	L 76–67
1991	First Round; Second Round	Washington State; Arkansas	W 82–62; L 105–68
1993	First Round; Second Round	Georgia Tech; Tennessee	W 90–62; L 89–66
1997	First Round	George Washington	L 61–46
2015	First Round	Arkansas	L 57–55
2021	First Round; Second Round	UCF; Louisville	W 62–51; L 62–53

=== NIT results ===
The Wildcats have appeared in the Women's National Invitation Tournament (WNIT) five times, having a combined record of 10–5. They also appeared in the National Women's Invitational Tournament (the precursor to the WNIT, with 8 teams instead of the traditional 64 the WNIT has) once, having a record of 2–1.

Year	Round	Opponent	Result
1996	Quarterfinals; Semifinals; Finals	Illinois State; Louisiana State; Arizona	W 93–71; W 79–75; L 79–63
2010	First Round; Second Round; Third Round	Duquesne; St. Bonaventure; Michigan	W 79–72; W 66–62; L 65–44
2011	First Round; Second Round	Creighton; Alabama	W 89–63; L 72–70
2014	First Round; Second Round; Third Round	Ball State; IUPUI; Indiana	W 69–55; W 88–52; L 66–65
2016	First Round	San Diego	L 69–55
2019	First Round; Second Round; Third Round; Quarterfinals; Semifinals; Finals	Dayton; Toledo; West Virginia; Ohio; James Madison; Arizona	W 74–51; W 54–47; W 56–54; W 61–58; W 74–69; L 56–42

=== AIAW Women's Basketball tournament ===
The Wildcats appeared in the AIAW women's basketball tournament (the precursor to the modern NCAA Women's Division I Basketball Championship) three times (the first being in a 16 team tournament and the latter two being in a 24 team tournament) before it was discontinued in 1982. They compiled a record of 1–3. They received a bye in 1980.

Year	Round	Opponent	Result
1979	First Round; Quarterfinals	Southern Connecticut State; Louisiana Tech	W 67–61; L 88–52
1980	Second Round	South Carolina	L 64–61
1981	First Round	Stephen F. Austin	L 88–67
