= 2013–14 Middle European League =

- League: Middle European League
- Sport: Basketball
- Duration: 27 September 2013 — 7 March 2014
- Number of games: 114
- Number of teams: 11

2013–14
- Season champions: (Slovakia) Good Angels Košice (2nd title)
- Season MVP: (United States) Tianna Hawkins

Middle European League seasons
- ← 2012–13

Middle European League for the season 2013-14 was the second and last season of the Middle European League.

== Team information ==
Country	Teams	Team	City	Venue	Capacity
Hungary	5				
Hungary	5	UNIQA Euroleasing Sopron	Sopron	MKB Aréna Sopron	2,200
Hungary	5	PEAC-Pécs	Pécs	Lauber Dezső Sportcsarnok	2,791
Hungary	5	Aluinvent DVTK Miskolc	Miskolc	Generali Aréna	1,688
Hungary	5	PINKK-Pécsi 424	Pécs	Komlói Sportközpont	705
Hungary	5	Ceglédi EKK	Cegléd	Városi Sportcsarnok	750
Slovakia	5				
Slovakia	5	Good Angels Košice	Košice	Infiniti Aréna/Steel Aréna	2,500/8,600
Slovakia	5	Piešťanské Čajky	Piešťany	Hala Gymnázia Pierra de Coubertina	400
Slovakia	5	MBK Ružomberok	Ružomberok	Športová hala Koniareň	2,500
Slovakia	5	ŠBK Šamorín	Šamorín	Športová Hala T-18	150
Slovakia	5	ŠKBD Růcon Spišská Nová Ves	Spišská Nová Ves	Športová Hala Spišská Nová Ves	500
Croatia	1				
Croatia	1	Novi Zagreb	Zagreb	Športska dvorana Trnsko	2,500

== Final four ==
club 1	result	club 2
semifinals
(Hungary) UNIQA Euroleasing Sopron	59:52	(Hungary) PEAC-Pécs
(Slovakia) Good Angels Košice	66:62	(Croatia) Novi Zagreb
for third place
(Hungary) PEAC-Pécs	64:58	(Croatia) Novi Zagreb
final
(Hungary) UNIQA Euroleasing Sopron	63:70	(Slovakia) Good Angels Košice

2013–14 Middle European League

Good Angels Košice
2nd Title

== Awards ==
- Finals MVP: Jia Perkins (173-G-82) of Good Angels
- Player of the Year: Miljana Bojović (181-G-87) of Good Angels
- Guard of the Year: Miljana Bojović (181-G-87) of Good Angels
- Forward of the Year: Tianna Hawkins (191-F-91) of UNIQA Eurol.
- Center of the Year: Luca Ivanković (198-C-87) of Novi Zagreb
- Import Player of the Year: Tianna Hawkins (191-F-91) of UNIQA Eurol.
- Defensive Player of the Year: Maurita Reid (172-PG-85) of PEAC-Pecs
- Coach of the Year: Maroš Kováčik of Good Angels

1st Team

- G: Miljana Bojović (181-G-87) of Good Angels
- PG: Milica Dabović (173-PG-82) of Lyon
- F: Tianna Hawkins (191-F-91) of UNIQA Eurol.
- F: Louella Tomlinson (193-F-88) of PINKK-Pecsi
- C: Luca Ivanković (198-C-87) of Novi Zagreb

2nd Team

- SG: Samantha Whitcomb (180-SG-88) of Rockingham
- G: Zsófia Fegyverneky (178-G-84) of UNIQA Eurol.
- F: Rebecca Tobin (195-F-88) of WF DVTK
- F/C: Stefanie Murphy (192-F/C-89) of MBK Ruzomb.
- C: Latoya Williams (192-C-87) of PEAC-Pecs

Honorable Mention

- Maurita Reid (172-PG-85) of PEAC-Pecs
- Tijana Ajduković (196-C-91) of Spartak V MR
- Brittainey Raven (183-G-88) of WF DVTK
- Helena Sverrisdottir (185-F/G-88) of WF DVTK
- Lucia Krč-Turbová (186-F-89) of Piestanske C.
- Amy Jaeschke (196-C-89) of Samorin
- Romana Vyňuchalová (192-C/F-86) of Samorin
- Agnieszka Skobel (180-SG-89) of Wisla Krakow

All-Imports Team

- SG: Samantha Whitcomb (180-SG-88) of Rockingham
- PG: Maurita Reid (172-PG-85) of PEAC-Pecs
- F: Tianna Hawkins (191-F-91) of UNIQA Eurol.
- F/C: Stefanie Murphy (192-F/C-89) of MBK Ruzomb.
- C: Latoya Williams (192-C-87) of PEAC-Pecs
