= Fenerbahçe Women Euroleague 2012–13 =

The 2012–13 season is the 22nd edition of Europe's premier basketball tournament for women – EuroLeague Women since it was rebranded to its current format.

== Group stage ==
=== Group B ===
	Team	Pld	W	L	PF	PA	Diff	Pts
1.	(Slovakia) Good Angels Košice	12	9	3	919	840	+79	21
2.	(Turkey) Fenerbahçe Istanbul	12	9	3	946	813	+133	21
3.	(Russia) Nadezhda Orenburg	12	8	4	861	857	+4	20
4.	(Italy) Famila Schio	12	7	5	839	823	+16	19
5.	(Romania) CSM Târgovişte	12	4	8	824	886	−62	16
6.	(Hungary) UNIQA Euroleasing Sopron	12	3	9	827	862	−35	15
7.	(France) Arras Pays d'Artois	12	2	10	750	885	−135	14

== Round 2 ==
Team #1	Agg.	Team #2	1st leg	2nd leg	3rd leg^{*}
Fenerbahçe Istanbul (Turkey)	2 – 0	(Hungary) Uni Győr	93 – 61	77 – 68	–

== Final eight ==
=== Quarter-final round ===
==== Group B ====
	Team	Pld	W	L	PF	PA	Diff	Pts
1.	(Turkey) Fenerbahçe Istanbul	3	3	0	228	173	+55	6
2.	(France) Bourges Basket	3	2	1	175	189	−14	5
3.	(Russia) Sparta&K M. R. Vidnoje	3	1	2	225	220	+5	4
4.	(Italy) Famila Schio	3	0	3	194	234	−40	3

=== Semi-final round ===
Semifinals; 22 March
(Russia) UMMC Ekaterinburg	73
(France) Bourges Basket	44
(Turkey) Fenerbahçe Istanbul	68
(Slovakia) Good Angels Košice	56

Final; 24 March
(Russia) UMMC Ekaterinburg	82
(Turkey) Fenerbahçe Istanbul	56
Third place
(France) Bourges Basket	65
(Slovakia) Good Angels Košice	57

==== Semifinal ====
22 March 2013
21:30 UTC+6

Report

Fenerbahçe Istanbul (Turkey)	68–56	(Slovakia) Good Angels Košice
Scoring by quarter: 14–15, 14–20, 23–10, 17–11
Pts: Cappie Pondexter (19); Rebs: Angel McCoughtry (14); Asts: Birsel Vardarlı (6)		Pts: Plenette Pierson (23); Rebs: Petra Kulichová (13); Asts: Miljana Bojović (6)

DIVS Sport Hall, Yekaterinburg
Attendance: 2000

=== Final ===
24 March 2013
19:00 UTC+6

Report

UMMC Ekaterinburg (Russia)	82–56	(Turkey) Fenerbahçe Istanbul
Scoring by quarter: 26 – 11, 13–13, 27 – 20, 16 – 12
Pts: Candace Parker (24); Rebs: Candace Parker (11); Asts: Deanna Nolan (6)		Pts: Ivana Matović, Angel McCoughtry (22); Rebs: Angel McCoughtry (7); Asts: Cappie Pondexter (4)

DIVS Sport Hall, Yekaterinburg
