= 2013 Seattle Storm season =

Results
- Record: 17–17 (.500)
- Place: 0th (Western)
- Playoff finish: Lost in Conference Semifinals (2-0) to Minnesota Lynx

Media
- Television: KONG; ESPN2, NBATV
- Radio: KFNQ

The 2013 WNBA season was the 14th season for the Seattle Storm of the Women's National Basketball Association.

== Transactions ==
=== WNBA draft ===
The following are the Storm's selections in the 2013 WNBA draft.

Round	Pick	Player	Nationality	School/team/country
1	6	Tianna Hawkins	United States	Maryland
2	18	Chelsea Poppens	United States	Iowa State
3	30	Jasmine James	United States	Georgia

=== Transaction log ===
- December 14, 2012: Lauren Jackson announces that her hamstring surgery will force her out of the 2013 season.
- January 11: The Storm waive Alison Lacey.
- February 7: The Storm signs free agents Temeka Johnson and Noelle Quinn, and waives Ann Wauters
- February 20: The Storm signs free agent Nakia Sanford
- March 5: The Storm re-signs Alysha Clark.
- April 15: The Storm signed 2012 draft pick Keisha Hampton.
- April 25: The Storm sign draft picks Tiana Hawkins and Chelsea Poppens.
- March 11: The Storm signed Cierra Bravard.
- May 4: The Storm waive Chay Shegog.
- May 9: Sue Bird undergoes knee surgery, announces that will sit out of 2013 season.
- May 12: The Storm waive Alexis Gray-Lawson.
- May 13: The Storm waive Jasmine James and Katelan Redmon.
- May 19: The Storm waive Keisha Hampton and Samantha MacKay.

== Roster ==
=== Depth ===
Pos.	Starter	Bench
C	Tina Thompson	Ashley Robinson
PF	Camille Little	Joslyn Tinkle
SF	Noelle Quinn	Tianna Hawkins
SG	Tanisha Wright	Alysha Clark
PG	Temeka Johnson	Shekinna Stricklen; Sue Bird

== Season standings ==
#	Western Conference					
#	Team	W	L	PCT	GB	GP
1	z-Minnesota Lynx	26	8	.765	-	34
2	x-Los Angeles Sparks	24	10	.706	2	34
3	x-Phoenix Mercury	19	15	.559	7	34
4	x-Seattle Storm	17	17	.500	9	34
5	e-San Antonio Silver Stars	12	22	.353	14	34
6	e-Tulsa Shock	11	23	.324	15	34

== Schedule ==
=== Preseason ===
2013 pre-season game log
Total: 2–0 (Home: 1–0; Road: 1–0)
Pre-season: 2–0 (Home: 1–0; Road: 1–0)

Game	Date	Team	Score	High points	High rebounds	High assists	Location Attendance	Record
1	May 12	@ Los Angeles	W 67–66	Thompson & Hawkins (8)	Noelle Quinn (7)	Temeka Johnson (5)	Walter Pyramid at Long Beach State; 1524	1–0
2	May 17	Tulsa	W 63–59	Tina Thompson (19)	Shekinna Stricklen (10)	Noelle Quinn (4)	Key Arena; 4347	2–0

2013 season schedule

=== Regular season ===
2013 game log
Total: 17–17 (Home: 9–8; Road: 8–9)
May: 0–1 (Home: 0–0; Road: 0–1)

Game	Date	Team	Score	High points	High rebounds	High assists	Location Attendance	Record
1	May 26	@ Los Angeles	L 69–102	Camille Little (13)	Quinn, Thompson, Wright, Johnson, Hawkins, & Stricklen (3)	Wright & Johnson (5)	Staples Center; 10090	0–1

June : 4–5 (Home: 2–2; Road: 2–3)

Game	Date	Team	Score	High points	High rebounds	High assists	Location Attendance	Record
2	June 2	Phoenix	W 75–72	Tanisha Wright (20)	Tina Thompson (6)	Temeka Johnson (6)	Key Arena; 9686	1–1
3	June 7	Tulsa	L 58–67	Tina Thompson (17)	Thompson & Little (5)	Quinn, Wright, & Johnson (2)	Key Arena; 6879	1–2
4	June 14	@ Atlanta	L 59–68	Thompson & Johnson (11)	Tina Thompson (7)	Tanisha Wright (6)	Philips Arena; 4960	1–3
5	June 16	@ Connecticut	W 78–66	Tina Thompson (17)	Camille Little (9)	Temeka Johnson (6)	Mohegan Sun Arena; 6550	2–3
6	June 18	Washington	W 96–86 (OT)	Tina Thompson (30)	Tina Thompson (8)	Tanisha Wright (6)	Key Arena; 4579	3–3
7	June 21	@ San Antonio	W 91–86	Camille Little (23)	Camille Little (10)	Temeka Johnson (7)	AT&T Center; 7009	4–3
8	June 22	@ Tulsa	L 70–92	Tianna Hawkins (17)	Little, Wright, & Clark (5)	Temeka Johnson (3)	BOK Center; 4327	4–4
9	June 28	NY Liberty	L 62–67	Temeka Johnson (22)	Quinn, Little, & Tanisha Wright (5)	Quinn, Wright, Johnson, Stricklen, Hawkins (1)	Key Arena; 7687	4–5
10	June 30	@ Indiana	L 63–71	Shekinna Stricklen (11)	Camille Little (8)	Wright & Johnson (3)	Bankers Life Fieldhouse; 6355	4–6

July : 3–4 (Home: 1–2; Road: 2–2)

Game	Date	Team	Score	High points	High rebounds	High assists	Location Attendance	Record
11	July 2	@ Chicago	W 69–60	Little & Johnson (16)	Tina Thompson (11)	Wright & Johnson (5)	Allstate Arena; 5808	5–6
12	July 6	@ Washington	L 59–62	Shekinna Stricklen (20)	Camille Little (6)	Temeka Johnson (10)	Verizon Center; 6174	5–7
13	July 9	@ NY Liberty	L 57–66	Tina Thompson (13)	Tina Thompson (7)	Temeka Johnson (5)	Prudential Center; 5766	5–8
14	July 14	Atlanta	W 73–65	Tanisha Wright (21)	Camille Little (10)	Temeka Johnson (5)	Key Arena; 6479	6–8
15	July 17	Tulsa	L 59–86	Camille Little (11)	Little & Clark (6)	Tanisha Wright (5)	Key Arena; 9686	6–9
16	July 20	Los Angeles	L 64–65	Camille Little (22)	Tina Thompson (7)	Temeka Johnson (5)	Key Arena; 6357	6–10
17	July 25	@ Los Angeles	W 73–66	Tina Thompson (23)	Thompson & Quinn (8)	Temeka Johnson (4)	Staples Center; 12651	7–10

August : 8–5 (Home: 5–2; Road: 3–3)

Game	Date	Team	Score	High points	High rebounds	High assists	Location Attendance	Record
All-Star Break
18	August 1	Phoenix	W 88–79	Thompson & Johnson (16)	Tina Thompson (7)	Wright & Johnson (7)	Key Arena; 6457	8–10
19	August 4	@ Minnesota	L 72–90	Shekinna Stricklen (24)	Wright & Quinn (6)	Tanisha Wright (6)	Target Center; 9032	8–11
20	August 6	@ Phoenix	W 80–65	Thompson & Wright (19)	Tina Thompson (8)	Tina Thompson (4)	US Airways Center; 6877	9–11
21	August 9	San Antonio	L 56–77	Shekinna Stricklen (16)	Clark & Quinn (5)	Little, Wright, Johnson, Hawkins, & Quinn (2)	Key Arena; 5978	9–12
22	August 11	San Antonio	W 69–63	Tina Thompson (17)	Thompson & Quinn (11)	Temeka Johnson (6)	Key Arena; 6249	10–12
23	August 15	Chicago	L 66–79	Tanisha Wright (20)	Tanisha Wright (5)	Temeka Johnson (6)	Key Arena; 6829	10–13
24	August 17	Indiana	W 77–70	Tina Thompson (23)	Tina Thompson (7)	Tanisha Wright (8)	Key Arena; 6889	11–13
25	August 20	Los Angeles	W 77–57	Temeka Johnson (18)	Tina Thompson (10)	Tanisha Wright (9)	Key Arena; 6738	12–13
26	August 23	@ Phoenix	W 81–73	Temeka Johnson (23)	Stricklen & Thompson (7)	Little & Johnson (3)	US Airways Center; 8026	13–13
27	August 25	@ San Antonio	L 64–70	Noelle Quinn (14)	Camille Little (6)	Tanisha Wright (7)	AT&T Center; 6828	13–14
28	August 27	@ San Antonio	W 72–71	Tina Thompson (27)	Tina Thompson (13)	Tanisha Wright (7)	AT&T Center; 6097	14–14
29	August 29	Connecticut	W 78–65	Thompson & Little (18)	Tina Thompson (9)	Temeka Johnson (9)	Key Arena; 5567	15–14
30	August 31	@ Minnesota	L 74–97	Tina Thompson (18)	Alysha Clark (5)	Tanisha Wright (10)	Target Center; 9123	15–15

September : 2–2 (Home: 1–2; Road: 1–0)

Game	Date	Team	Score	High points	High rebounds	High assists	Location Attendance	Record
31	September 7	Minnesota	L 60–75	Tanisha Wright (22)	Tanisha Wright (8)	Tanisha Wright (3)	Key Arena; 8147	15–16
32	September 10	Minnesota	L 60–73	Tanisha Wright (14)	Noelle Quinn (8)	Tanisha Wright (5)	Key Arena; 5486	15–17
33	September 12	@ Tulsa	W 76–67	Shekinna Stricklen (26)	Tina Thompson (10)	Tanisha Wright (6)	BOK Center; 6513	16–17
34	September 14	Tulsa	W 85–73	Tina Thompson (22)	Noelle Quinn (10)	Tanisha Wright (8)	Key Arena; 8978	17–17

2013 season schedule

=== Playoffs ===
2013 playoff game log
Total: 0–2 (Home: 0–1; Road: 0–1)
Conference Semifinals: 0–2 (Home: 0–1; Road: 0–1)

Game	Date	Team	Score	High points	High rebounds	High assists	Location Attendance	Series
1	September 20	@ Minnesota	L 64–80	Temeka Johnson (14)	Tina Thompson (8)	Wright & Johnson (4)	Target Center; 8832	0–1
2	September 22	Minnesota	L 55–58	Tanisha Wright (16)	Thompson & Clark (9)	Stricklen, Johnson, & Wright (2)	Tacoma Dome; 3457	0–2

2013 season schedule

== Statistics ==
Legend
GP	Games played	GS	Games started	MPG	Minutes per game	RPG	Rebounds per game
APG	Assists per game	SPG	Steals per game	BPG	Blocks per game	PPG	Points per game
FG%	Field-goal percentage	3P%	3-point field-goal percentage	FT%	Free-throw percentage	TO	Turnovers per game
PF	Fouls per game		Team leader		League leader

=== Regular season ===
Player	GP	GS	MPG	FG%	3P%	FT%	RPG	APG	SPG	BPG	PPG
