= 2013 Phoenix Mercury season =

- Head coach: Corey Gaines (10-11); Russ Pennell (9-4)
- Arena: US Airways Center

Results
- Record: 19–15 (.559)
- Place: 3rd (Western)
- Playoff finish: Lost Conference Finals (2-0 to Minnesota Lynx)

Media
- Television: FS-A; ESPN2, NBATV

The 2013 WNBA season was the 17th season for the Phoenix Mercury of the Women's National Basketball Association.

There were high hopes for the Mercury after they drafted Brittney Griner first overall in the 2013 WNBA draft. However, the Mercury got off to a slow start, and ultimately fired coach Corey Gaines on August 8, 2013, replacing him with Russ Pennell. Amber Cox, the Mercury President and CEO, took over Gaines' GM duties. Pennell helped turn things around, securing the third seed in the 2013 WNBA Playoffs. The Mercury earned a spot in the Western Conference finals against the Minnesota Lynx.

== Transactions ==
=== WNBA draft ===
The following are the Mercury's selections in the 2013 WNBA draft.

Round	Pick	Player	Nationality	School/team/country
1	1	Brittney Griner	United States	Baylor
3	26	Nikki Greene	United States	Penn State

=== Transaction log ===
- February 8: re-signed Krystal Thomas and Lynetta Kizer.
- March 7: signed Ify Ibekwe and Jalana Childs.
- April 11: re-signed DeWanna Bonner.

=== Trades ===
Date	Trade	
TBD	To Phoenix Mercury	To TBD
TBD	TBD	TBD

=== Personnel changes ===
==== Additions ====
Player	Signed	Former team
Brittney Griner	April 15, 2013	draft pick
Jasmine James	July 21, 2013	free agent

==== Subtractions ====
Player	Left	New team
Eddie Garner	Preseason	released
Samantha Prahalis	July 18, 2013	released

== Roster ==
2013 Phoenix Mercury roster
Players
Coaches

Pos.	No.	Nat.	Name	Height	Weight	DOB	From	Yrs
G/F	24	(United States)	Bonner, DeWanna	6' 4" (1.93m)	137 lb (62kg)	1987-08-21	Auburn	4
F	4	(United States)	Dupree, Candice	6' 2" (1.88m)	175 lb (79kg)	1984-08-16	Temple	7
G	15	(United States)	Gilbreath, Briana	6' 0" (1.83m)	150 lb (68kg)	1990-08-16	USC	1
C	42	(United States)	Griner, Brittney	6' 8" (2.03m)	208 lb (94kg)	1990-10-18	Baylor	R
G	14	(United States)	Hornbuckle, Alexis	5' 10" (1.78m)	155 lb (70kg)	1985-10-16	Tennessee	5
F	22	(United States)	Houston, Charde	6' 0" (1.83m)	189 lb (86kg)	1986-04-10	Connecticut	5
C	12	(United States)	Kizer, Lynetta	6' 4" (1.93m)	230 lb (104kg)	1990-04-04	Maryland	1
G	10	(United States)	James, Jasmine	5' 9" (1.75m)		1991-05-29	Georgia	R
G	3	(United States)	Taurasi, Diana	6' 0" (1.83m)	163 lb (74kg)	1982-06-11	Connecticut	9
F	13	(Australia)	Taylor, Penny	6' 1" (1.85m)	165 lb (75kg)	1981-05-24	Australia	11
F/C	34	(United States)	Thomas, Krystal	6' 5" (1.96m)	195 lb (88kg)	1989-06-10	Duke	2

Head coach
(United States) Russ Pennell (Pittsburg State)
Assistant coaches
(United States) Julie Hairgrove (Arizona)
(United States) Anthony Boone (Mississippi)
Athletic trainer
(United States) Tamara Poole (Cal State Dominguez Hills)

Legend

- (C) Team captain
- (DP) Unsigned draft pick
- (FA) Free agent
- (S) Suspended
- Injured

=== Depth ===
Pos.	Starter	Bench
C	Brittney Griner	Lynetta Kizer; Krystal Thomas
PF	Candice Dupree	Charde Houston
SF	Penny Taylor	Jasmine James
SG	DeWanna Bonner	Briana Gilbreath
PG	Diana Taurasi	Alexis Hornbuckle

== Season standings ==
#	Western Conference					
#	Team	W	L	PCT	GB	GP
1	z-Minnesota Lynx	26	8	.765	-	34
2	x-Los Angeles Sparks	24	10	.706	2	34
3	x-Phoenix Mercury	19	15	.559	7	34
4	x-Seattle Storm	17	17	.500	9	34
5	e-San Antonio Silver Stars	12	22	.353	14	34
6	e-Tulsa Shock	11	23	.324	15	34

== Schedule ==
=== Preseason ===
2013 pre-season game log
Total: 1–0 (Home: 1–0; Road: 0–0)
Pre-season: 1–0 (Home: 1–0; Road: 0–0)

Game	Date	Team	Score	High points	High rebounds	High assists	Location Attendance	Record
1	May 19	Japan	W 87–64	Brittney Griner (18)	Dupree & Kizer (9)	Samantha Prahalis (8)	US Airways Center; 4021	1–0

2013 season schedule

=== Regular season ===
2013 game log
Total: 19–15 (Home: 10–7; Road: 9–8)
May: 0–1 (Home: 0–1; Road: 0–0)

Game	Date	Team	Score	High points	High rebounds	High assists	Location Attendance	Record
1	May 27	Chicago	L 80–102	Diana Taurasi (18)	Brittney Griner (8)	Samantha Prahalis (5)	US Airways Center; 10200	0–1

June : 7–3 (Home: 2–1; Road: 5–2)

Game	Date	Team	Score	High points	High rebounds	High assists	Location Attendance	Record
2	June 2	@ Seattle	L 72–75	Candice Dupree (18)	Brittney Griner (7)	Charde Houston (6)	Key Arena; 9686	0–2
3	June 6	@ Minnesota	L 79–99	Diana Taurasi (21)	DeWanna Bonner (7)	Samantha Prahalis (5)	Target Center; 8511	0–3
4	June 8	@ Indiana	W 82–67	Diana Taurasi (26)	DeWanna Bonner (11)	Bonner, Dupree, & Taurasi (5)	Bankers Life Fieldhouse; 8672	1–3
5	June 14	Los Angeles	W 97–81	Diana Taurasi (34)	DeWanna Bonner (12)	Diana Taurasi (7)	US Airways Center; 13065	2–3
6	June 16	@ Tulsa	W 108–103 (OT)	Diana Taurasi (29)	Candice Dupree (10)	Diana Taurasi (9)	BOK Center; 4206	3–3
7	June 19	Minnesota	L 69–80	Diana Taurasi (28)	Brittney Griner (7)	DeWanna Bonner (5)	US Airways Center; 8464	3–4
8	June 21	Washington	W 90–82	Diana Taurasi (31)	DeWanna Bonner (9)	Diana Taurasi (5)	US Airways Center; 9636	4–4
9	June 25	@ San Antonio	W 83–77	Brittney Griner (26)	Candice Dupree (12)	Diana Taurasi (8)	AT&T Center; 9007	5–4
10	June 27	@ Washington	W 101–97	Diana Taurasi (26)	Candice Dupree (11)	Diana Taurasi (8)	Verizon Center; 7950	6–4
11	June 29	@ Connecticut	W 89–70	Bonner & Taurasi (19)	DeWanna Bonner (8)	Diana Taurasi (5)	Mohegan Sun Arena; 9110	7–4

July : 2–5 (Home: 1–3; Road: 1–2)

Game	Date	Team	Score	High points	High rebounds	High assists	Location Attendance	Record
12	July 2	NY Liberty	W 94–87	Bonner & Dupree (20)	Bonner & Dupree (7)	Diana Taurasi (10)	US Airways Center; 7636	8–4
13	July 7	@ Minnesota	L 59–91	Candice Dupree (12)	Brittney Griner (11)	Diana Taurasi (7)	Target Center; 9104	8–5
14	July 10	San Antonio	L 80–88	Candice Dupree (22)	Krystal Thomas (6)	Diana Taurasi (5)	US Airways Center; 8707	8–6
15	July 14	Los Angeles	L 76–88	Diana Taurasi (23)	Candice Dupree (8)	Diana Taurasi (5)	US Airways Center; 8233	8–7
16	July 18	@ Los Angeles	W 90–84	Diana Taurasi (32)	DeWanna Bonner (11)	Diana Taurasi (6)	Staples Center; 11105	9–7
17	July 21	Minnesota	L 77–82	Diana Taurasi (26)	DeWanna Bonner (10)	Diana Taurasi (6)	US Airways Center; 9806	9–8
18	July 24	@ Minnesota	L 69–81	Candice Dupree (17)	Krystal Thomas (10)	Alexis Hornbuckle (4)	Target Center; 16404	9–9

August : 6–4 (Home: 5–2; Road: 1–2)

Game	Date	Team	Score	High points	High rebounds	High assists	Location Attendance	Record
All-Star Break
19	August 1	@ Seattle	L 79–88	DeWanna Bonner (19)	Candice Dupree (10)	DeWanna Bonner (7)	Key Arena; 6457	9–10
20	August 3	Atlanta	W 82–76	Diana Taurasi (28)	DeWanna Bonner (6)	Bonner, Dupree, & Taurasi (4)	US Airways Center; 8138	10–10
21	August 6	Seattle	L 65–80	Candice Dupree (18)	Candice Dupree (8)	Diana Taurasi (5)	US Airways Center; 6877	10–11
22	August 9	Tulsa	W 70–67	Diana Taurasi (23)	Candice Dupree (9)	Taurasi & Hornbuckle (4)	US Airways Center; 8547	11–11
23	August 11	Tulsa	W 77–56	DeWanna Bonner (21)	Candice Dupree (7)	Diana Taurasi (7)	US Airways Center; 5972	12–11
24	August 14	Indiana	W 75–58	Candice Dupree (16)	Brittney Griner (8)	Diana Taurasi (11)	US Airways Center; 6135	13–11
25	August 17	@ San Antonio	L 82–88	Diana Taurasi (23)	Briana Gilbreath (6)	Diana Taurasi (7)	AT&T Center; 10906	13–12
26	August 20	@ Tulsa	W 89–86	Diana Taurasi (28)	Dupree & Griner (10)	Diana Taurasi (10)	BOK Center; 4261	14–12
27	August 23	Seattle	L 73–81	DeWanna Bonner (20)	Bonner & Griner (5)	Diana Taurasi (7)	US Airways Center; 8026	14–13
28	August 31	Connecticut	W 76–68	Bonner & Dupree (22)	Candice Dupree (9)	Diana Taurasi (8)	US Airways Center; 8119	15–13

September : 4–2 (Home: 2–0; Road: 2–2)

Game	Date	Team	Score	High points	High rebounds	High assists	Location Attendance	Record
29	September 6	San Antonio	W 83–80	Diana Taurasi (21)	Brittney Griner (14)	Diana Taurasi (7)	US Airways Center; 9006	16–13
30	September 8	@ Atlanta	W 79–71	Diana Taurasi (25)	Brittney Griner (11)	Diana Taurasi (6)	Philips Arena; 9740	17–13
31	September 10	@ NY Liberty	W 80–76	Bonner & Dupree (18)	Dupree & Taurasi (6)	Diana Taurasi (9)	Prudential Center; 8127	18–13
32	September 11	@ Chicago	L 68–70	Candice Dupree (15)	Dupree & Gilbreath (6)	Jasmine James (5)	Allstate Arena; 6409	18–14
33	September 13	San Antonio	W 82–61	Diana Taurasi (20)	Krystal Thomas (8)	Diana Taurasi (10)	US Airways Center; 8899	19–14
34	September 15	@ Los Angeles	L 55–89	Griner & James (9)	Krystal Thomas (8)	Jasmine James (4)	Staples Center; 12311	19–15

2013 season schedule

=== Playoffs ===
2013 playoff game log
Total: 2–3 (Home: 0–2; Road: 2–1)
Conference Semifinals: 2–1 (Home: 0–1; Road: 2–0)

Game	Date	Team	Score	High points	High rebounds	High assists	Location Attendance	Series
1	September 19	@ Los Angeles	W 86–75	Diana Taurasi (30)	Candice Dupree (7)	Diana Taurasi (7)	Staples Center; 8500	1–0
2	September 21	Los Angeles	L 73–82	Diana Taurasi (20)	Candice Dupree (9)	Diana Taurasi (5)	US Airways Center; 11110	1–1
3	September 23	@ Los Angeles	W 78–77	Candice Dupree (22)	Bonner & Gilbreath (6)	Diana Taurasi (10)	Staples Center; 9321	2–1

Conference Finals: 0–2 (Home: 0–1; Road: 0–1)

Game	Date	Team	Score	High points	High rebounds	High assists	Location Attendance	Series
1	September 26	@ Minnesota	L 62–85	Diana Taurasi (15)	Brittney Griner (6)	Bonner & Dupree (3)	Target Center; 9013	0–1
2	September 29	Minnesota	L 65–72	Diana Taurasi (21)	Brittney Griner (10)	Diana Taurasi (6)	US Airways Center; 8020	0–2

2013 season schedule

== Statistics ==
Legend
GP	Games played	GS	Games started	MPG	Minutes per game	RPG	Rebounds per game
APG	Assists per game	SPG	Steals per game	BPG	Blocks per game	PPG	Points per game
FG%	Field-goal percentage	3P%	3-point field-goal percentage	FT%	Free-throw percentage	TO	Turnovers per game
PF	Fouls per game		Team leader		League leader

=== Regular season ===
Player	GP	GS	MPG	FG%	3P%	FT%	RPG	APG	SPG	BPG	PPG
