= Lynetta Kizer =

American-Bosnian basketball player (born 1990)

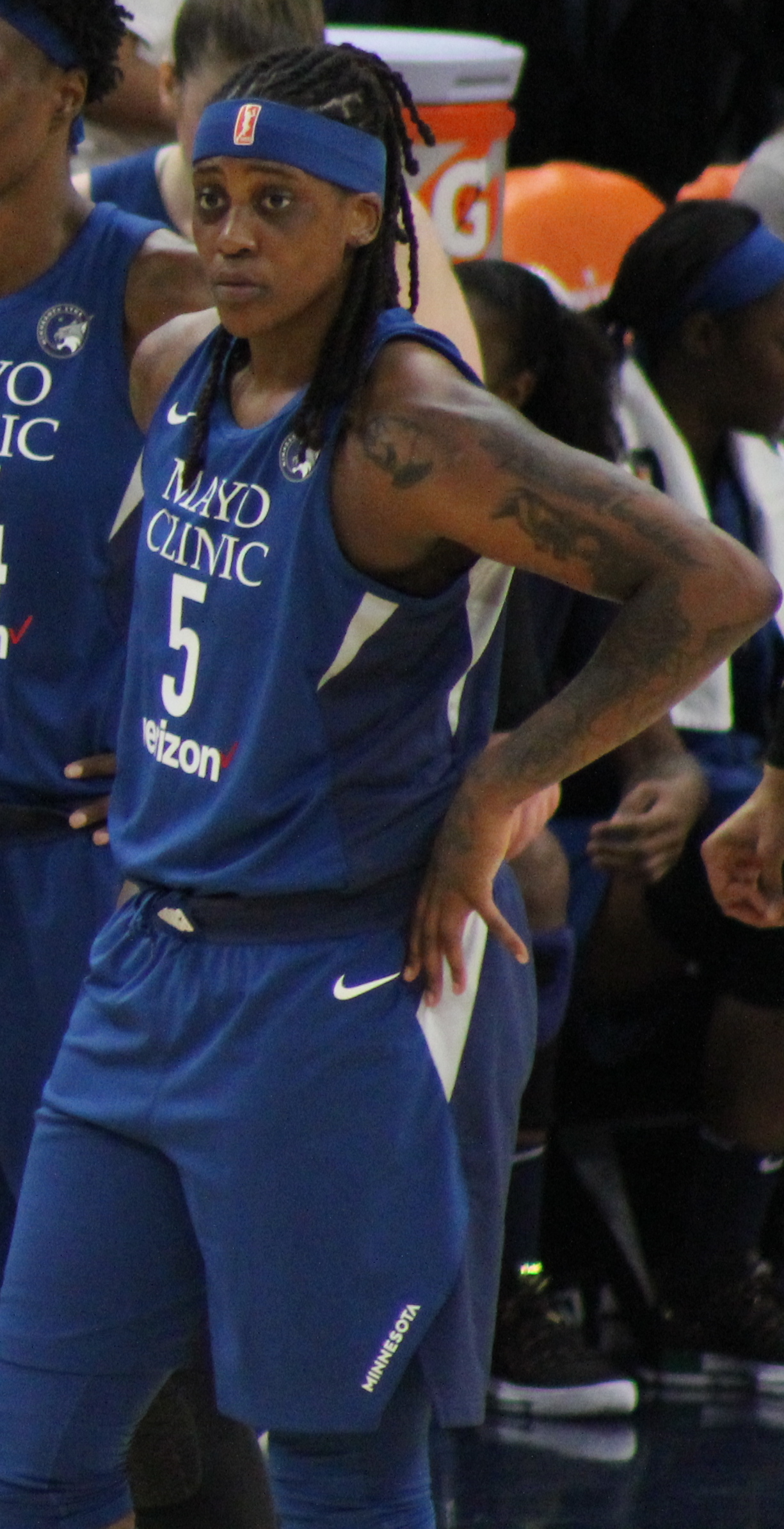
- Kizer with the Minnesota Lynx in 2018

Free agent
- Position: Center

Personal information
- Born: April 4, 1990 (age 36)
- Listed height: 6 ft 4 in (1.93 m)
- Listed weight: 243 lb (110 kg)

Career information
- High school: Potomac (Dumfries, Virginia)
- College: Maryland (2008–2012)
- WNBA draft: 2012: 3rd round, 29th overall pick
- Drafted by: Tulsa Shock
- Playing career: 2012–present

Career history
- 2012: Tulsa Shock
- 2012–2013: Phoenix Mercury
- 2012–2013: KB Stars
- 2014: Good Angels Košice
- 2014–2016: Indiana Fever
- 2014–2015: Hatay Bsb
- 2015–2016: Galatasaray
- 2016–2017: Olympiacos
- 2017: Connecticut Sun
- 2017–2018: Shandong Six Stars
- 2018: Fenerbahçe
- 2018: Minnesota Lynx
- 2018: Shandong Six Stars
- 2018–2019: CCC Polkowice
- 2020: Della Fiore Broni
- 2021: Çankaya University Sports Club
- 2021–2022: Panathinaikos
- 2023: Rojas
- 2024: CB Islas Canarias
- 2024: Geelong United

Career highlights
- Polish BLK champion (2019); Polish Cup winner (2019); Greek League champion (2017); Greek Cup winner (2017); Slovakian Extraliga champion (2014); Middle European League champion (2014); ACC Sixth Player of the Year (2012); Second-team All-ACC (2011); Third-team All-ACC (2010); ACC Rookie of the Year (2009); ACC All-Freshman Team (2009); McDonald's All-American (2008)
- Stats at WNBA.com
- Stats at Basketball Reference
Medals
Women's basketball
Representing United States
World University Games
Gold medal – first place	2011 Shenzhen	Team
FIBA Under-18 Americas Championship
Gold medal – first place	2008 Argentina	Team

Lynetta Kizer (born April 4, 1990) is an American-Bosnian professional basketball player who last played for Geelong United of the Women's National Basketball League (WNBL). She played college basketball for the University of Maryland.

== Early life ==
Kizer's hometown is Woodbridge, Virginia. She grew up with an older brother and a younger sister.

Kizer attended Potomac Senior High School in Dumfries, Virginia, where she played all four years as a starting center. She was also a three-time team captain. By her senior year, Kizer was rated the fifth overall prospect and the top center in the nation in the 2008 class, according to HoopGurlz.com. Her high school exploits earned her a scholarship from the Anne & Bob Strahota Director's Circle.

== College career ==
Kizer played four years of college basketball at the University of Maryland for the Terrapin's women's basketball team between 2008 and 2012. She earned ACC Freshman of the Year and ACC All-Freshman Team in 2008–09. She went on to earn third-team All-ACC in 2010, second-team All-ACC in 2011, and ACC Sixth Player of the Year in 2012. She was also All-ACC Honorable Mention as a senior. While at Maryland, Kizer was a family science major.

=== Maryland statistics ===
Legend
GP	Games played	GS	Games started	MPG	Minutes per game
FG%	Field goal percentage	3P%	3-point field goal percentage	FT%	Free throw percentage
RPG	Rebounds per game	APG	Assists per game	SPG	Steals per game
BPG	Blocks per game	PPG	Points per game	**Bold**	Career high

Year	Team	GP	Points	FG%	3P%	FT%	RPG	APG	SPG	BPG	PPG
2008–09	Maryland	**36**	401	49.8	–	68.2	7.3	0.8	**1.1**	**0.9**	11.1
2009–10	Maryland	34	**437**	**52.8**	**55.0**	**75.0**	**7.8**	0.8	0.9	0.4	12.9
2010–11	Maryland	32	423	45.5	37.5	68.3	**7.8**	0.9	**1.1**	0.8	**13.2**
2011–12	Maryland	33	360	43.7	31.3	69.2	5.5	**1.0**	0.8	0.2	10.9
Career	Maryland	135	1621	47.9	38.1	70.0	7.1	0.9	1.0	0.6	12.0

== Professional career ==
=== WNBA ===
Kizer was the 29th overall pick, in the third round of the 2012 WNBA draft, selected by the Tulsa Shock. She played seven games for the Shock to start the 2012 WNBA season before joining the Phoenix Mercury, where she played 15 games to finish the season. She re-joined the Mercury for the 2013 WNBA season, playing 32 games.

Kizer joined the Indiana Fever for the 2014 WNBA season. She continued with the Fever in 2015 and 2016. She helped the Fever reach the WNBA Finals in 2015 and tallied a career-best 9.6 points (55.6%) with 3.2 rebounds in 33 games in 2016.

On February 21, 2017, Kizer was acquired by the Connecticut Sun in a three-team trade. She played in 20 games for Connecticut during the 2017 WNBA season, averaging 6.0 points and 2.9 rebounds in 11.9 minutes per game while shooting 48.0% from the field.

On February 8, 2018, Kizer signed with the Minnesota Lynx. On June 30, 2018, she was waived by the Lynx. She averaged 1.8 points (25.0%) and 1.6 rebounds in 12 games during the 2018 WNBA season.

Kizer spent training camp and preseason with the Atlanta Dream prior to the 2019 WNBA season.

=== Overseas ===
Kizer played 17 games for KB Stars in Korea in the 2012–13 season.

In February 2014, Kizer joined Good Angels Košice in Slovakia for the rest of the 2013-14 season. She played in 11 Extraliga games and helped the team win the championship.

For the 2014–15 season, Kizer joined Hatay Bsb in Turkey. She continued in Turkey for the 2015–16 season with Galatasaray.

Kizer played 24 games for Olympiacos Pireus during the 2016-17 season.

For the 2017–18 season, Kizer joined Shandong Six Stars of the Women's Chinese Basketball Association. She played 17 games for the team before returning to Turkey in February 2018, where she played three games for Fenerbahçe.

Kizer started the 2018–19 season with Shandong Six Stars, playing one game before joining CCC Polkowice in Poland in November 2018. He played 23 games for Polkowice.

For the 2020–21 season, Kizer joined Della Fiore Broni of the Italian Women's Basketball League. She played four games in October 2020 and then left the team.

Kizer played four games for the Çankaya University Sports Club to begin the 2021–22 season before joining Panathinaikos women's basketball team of the Greek women's basketball league in November 2021. She was waived by the team on 4 May 2022.

In 2023, Kizer played for Mexican team Rojas of the LNBPF. In 20 games, she averaged 11.4 points, 6.0 rebounds and 1.6 assists per game.

In January 2024, Kizer joined Spanish team CB Islas Canarias. In seven games, she averaged 6.0 points and 4.1 rebounds per game.

In September 2024, Kizer signed with Geelong United of the Women's National Basketball League (WNBL) for the 2024–25 season. She was released by Geelong on November 17, 2024.

== WNBA career statistics ==
Legend
GP	Games played	GS	Games started	MPG	Minutes per game	RPG	Rebounds per game
APG	Assists per game	SPG	Steals per game	BPG	Blocks per game	PPG	Points per game
TO	Turnovers per game	FG%	Field-goal percentage	3P%	3-point field-goal percentage	FT%	Free-throw percentage
**Bold**	Career best	°	League leader

=== Regular season ===
Year	Team	GP	GS	MPG	FG%	3P%	FT%	RPG	APG	SPG	BPG	TO	PPG
2012	Tulsa	7	0	9.4	.176	.000	.929	2.1	0.0	0.6	0.0	0.4	2.7
2012	Phoenix	15	0	15.6	.444	**.750**	**.941**	3.4	0.5	0.4	0.1	1.1	7.1
2013	Phoenix	27	0	9.9	.449	.000	.643	2.1	0.2	0.4	0.2	0.8	2.6
2014	Indiana	31	1	9.0	.431	.000	.619	2.4	0.1	0.3	0.3	0.8	3.8
2015	Indiana	**33**	**14**	**17.9**	.491	.000	.879	**3.5**	0.4	0.6	0.2	1.4	8.3
2016	Indiana	**33**	12	17.2	**.556**	.000	.8000	3.2	**0.6**	**0.8**	0.3	1.1	**9.6**
2017	Connecticut	20	1	11.9	.480	.000	.767	2.9	0.3	0.6	**0.4**	0.5	6.0
2018	Minnesota	14	0	5.6	.242	.000	.600	1.5	0.6	0.1	0.0	0.4	1.6
Career	7 years, 5 teams	180	28	12.9	.477	.214	.799	2.8	0.3	0.5	0.2	0.9	5.8

=== Playoffs ===
Year	Team	GP	GS	MPG	FG%	3P%	FT%	RPG	APG	SPG	BPG	TO	PPG
2013	Phoenix	5	0	9.4	**.727**	.000	.000	1.2	0.0	**0.4**	0.2	0.4	3.2
2014	Indiana	5	0	6.0	.429	.000	**.750**	1.2	**0.6**	0.2	**0.4**	0.0	3.0
2015	Indiana	**9**	0	8.9	.414	.000	**.750**	**2.4**	0.2	0.3	0.1	0.8	3.0
2016	Indiana	1	0	**13.0**	.667	.000	.000	2.0	0.0	0.0	0.0	0.0	**4.0**
Career	4 years, 2 teams	20	0	8.5	.491	.000	.667	1.8	0.3	0.3	0.2	0.5	3.1

== National team career ==
Kizer was a member of the USA under-18 team which won the gold medal at the 2008 FIBA Americas Championship in Buenos Aires, Argentina. She helped the team win all five games, averaging 8.6 points per game.

Kizer played for Team USA at the 2011 World University Games in Shenzhen, China. The team, coached by Bill Fennelly, won all six games to earn the gold medal. Kizer averaged 7.0 points per game.

On May 14, 2015, it was announced that Kizer would be a member of the Bosnia and Herzegovina women's national basketball team. She played for Bosnia during 2015 FIBA EuroBasket Qualifiers and 2017 FIBA EuroBasket Qualifiers.
