= Euroleague Women 2007–08 Regular Season Group C =

Standings and Results for Group C of the Regular Season phase of the 2007-08 Euroleague Women basketball tournament.

Main page: EuroLeague Women 2007-08

Key to colors
Top four places in each group advance to Eighth-Final Play-Offs
Eliminated

== Standings ==
	Team	Pld	W	L	PF	PA	Diff
1.	(Russia) Spartak Moscow Region	10	9	1	839	676	+163
2.	(Czech Republic) Gambrinus SIKA Brno	10	8	2	840	689	+151
3.	(Poland) Lotos PKO BP Gdynia	10	5	5	747	732	+15
4.	(France) US Valenciennes Olympic	10	4	6	665	744	-79
5.	(Slovakia) Kosit 2013 Kosice	10	3	7	648	717	-69
6.	(Belgium) Dexia W Namur	10	1	9	626	807	-181

== Fixtures and results ==
=== Game 1 ===
November 7–8, 2007

November 7
17:00

(Report)

Spartak Moscow Region (Russia)	62–60	(Slovakia) Kosit 2013
Scoring by quarter: 15-26, 15-12, 22-12, 10-10

Vidnoye

November 7
18:00

(Report)

SIKA Brno (Czech Republic)	85–72	(Poland) Lotos Gdynia
Scoring by quarter: 23-23, 20-19, 14-17, 28-13

Brno

November 8
20:30

(Report)

Dexia W Namur (Belgium)	75–57	(France) US Valenciennes
Scoring by quarter: 18-16, 17-15, 15-11, 25-15

Namur

=== Game 2 ===
November 14–15, 2007

November 14
18:00

(Report)

Kosit 2013 (Slovakia)	70–62	(Belgium) Dexia W Namur
Scoring by quarter: 19-21, 19-11, 17-21, 15-9

Košice

November 14
20:30

(Report)

US Valenciennes (France)	55–74	(Czech Republic) SIKA Brno
Scoring by quarter: 14-16, 15-10, 16-17, 10-31

Valenciennes

November 15
17:30

(Report)

Lotos Gdynia (Poland)	67–66	(Russia) Spartak Moscow Region
Scoring by quarter: 17-14, 14-20, 24-11, 12-21

Gdynia

=== Game 3 ===
November 21–22, 2007

November 21
18:00

(Report)

SIKA Brno (Czech Republic)	85–68	(Slovakia) Kosit 2013
Scoring by quarter: 20-18, 27-25, 18-19, 20-6

Brno

November 22
17:30

(Report)

Lotos Gdynia (Poland)	73–79	(France) US Valenciennes
Scoring by quarter: 20-24, 24-15, 8-17, 21-23

Gdynia

November 22
20:30

(Report)

Dexia W Namur (Belgium)	75–81	(Russia) Spartak Moscow Region
Scoring by quarter: 21-21, 24-19, 10-18, 20-23

Namur

=== Game 4 ===
November 28–29, 2007

November 28
18:00

(Report)

Kosit 2013 (Slovakia)	58–62	(France) US Valenciennes
Scoring by quarter: 10-13, 16-8, 13-25, 19-16

Košice

November 28
18:00

(Report)

Spartak Moscow Region (Russia)	85–76	(Czech Republic) SIKA Brno
Scoring by quarter: 17-23, 29-10, 20-19, 19-24

Vidnoye

November 29
17:30

(Report)

Lotos Gdynia (Poland)	87–77	(Belgium) Dexia W Namur
Scoring by quarter: 19-20, 23-22, 28-18, 17-17

Gdynia

=== Game 5 ===
December 5, 2007

December 5
18:00

(Report)

Kosit 2013 (Slovakia)	79–77	(Poland) Lotos Gdynia
Scoring by quarter: 20-23, 21-21, 20-22, 18-11

Košice

December 5
18:00

(Report)

SIKA Brno (Czech Republic)	93–66	(Belgium) Dexia W Namur
Scoring by quarter: 19-11, 28-15, 21-18, 25-22

Brno

December 5
20:30

(Report)

US Valenciennes (France)	70–91	(Russia) Spartak Moscow Region
Scoring by quarter: 20-30, 20-24, 16-24, 14-13

Valenciennes

=== Game 6 ===
December 12–13, 2007

December 12
17:30

(Report)

Kosit 2013 (Slovakia)	62– 84	(Russia) Spartak Moscow Region
Scoring by quarter: 16-18, 15-24, 11-25, 20-17

Košice

December 12
20:30

(Report)

US Valenciennes (France)	79–55	(Belgium) Dexia W Namur
Scoring by quarter: 24-9, 19-14, 18-21, 18-11

Valenciennes

December 13
17:30

(Report)

Lotos Gdynia (Poland)	78–93	(Czech Republic) SIKA Brno
Scoring by quarter: 23-35, 13-14, 22-21, 20-23

Gdynia

=== Game 7 ===
December 19–20, 2007

December 19
18:00

(Report)

SIKA Brno (Czech Republic)	82–62	(France) US Valenciennes
Scoring by quarter: 31-12, 20-17, 19-18, 16-15

Brno

December 20
17:00

(Report)

Spartak Moscow Region (Russia)	87–65	(Poland) Lotos Gdynia
Scoring by quarter: 22-12, 14-22, 34-19, 17-12

Vidnoye

December 20
20:30

(Report)

Dexia W Namur (Belgium)	56–66	(Slovakia) Kosit 2013
Scoring by quarter: 9-16, 21-16, 10-16, 16-18

Namur

=== Game 8 ===
January 9–10, 2008

January 9
17:00

(Report)

Spartak Moscow Region (Russia)	102–62	(Belgium) Dexia W Namur
Scoring by quarter: 28-6, 20-18

Vidnoye

January 9
18:00

(Report)

Kosit 2013 (Slovakia)	60–78	(Czech Republic) SIKA Brno
Scoring by quarter: 15-16, 14-21, 14-15, 17-26

Košice

January 10
20:30

(Report)

US Valenciennes (France)	66–71	(Poland) Lotos Gdynia
Scoring by quarter: 17-13, 15-16, 20-24, 14-18

Valenciennes

=== Game 9 ===
January 16–17, 2007

January 16
18:00

(Report)

SIKA Brno (Czech Republic)	77–85	(Russia) Spartak Moscow Region
Scoring by quarter: 29-27, 21-18, 17-23, 10-17

Brno

January 16
20:30

(Report)

US Valenciennes (France)	73–65	(Slovakia) Kosit 2013
Scoring by quarter: 16-21, 15-16, 20-21, 22-7

Valenciennes

January 17
20:30

(Report)

Dexia W Namur (Belgium)	40–79	(Poland) Lotos Gdynia
Scoring by quarter: 8-13, 14-15, 10-28, 8-23

Namur

=== Game 10 ===
January 23, 2007

January 23
17:00

(Report)

Spartak Moscow Region (Russia)	92–62	(France) US Valenciennes
Scoring by quarter: 22-15, 17-21, 31-8, 22-18

Vidnoye

January 23
17:30

(Report)

Lotos Gdynia (Poland)	78–60	(Slovakia) Kosit 2013
Scoring by quarter: 28-15, 16-16, 20-15, 14-14

Gdynia

January 23
20:30

(Report)

Dexia W Namur (Belgium)	58–93	(Czech Republic) SIKA Brno
Scoring by quarter: 22-18, 10-25, 5-21, 21-29

Namur
