= 2008 McDonald's All-American Girls Game =

East	West
64	80
	1st half	2nd half	Total
East	33	31	64
West	43	37	80
- Date: March 26, 2008
- Venue: Bradley Center, Milwaukee, Wisconsin
- MVP: Brooklyn Pope, Nikki Speed
- Referees: Jodi Duffe, Denita Lee-Johnson, Ron Quirk
- Attendance: 10,914
- Network: ESPNU

McDonald's All-American

The 2008 McDonald's All-American Girls Game was an All-star basketball game played on Wednesday, March 26, 2008, at the Bradley Center in Milwaukee, Wisconsin, home of the NBA's Milwaukee Bucks. The game's rosters featured the best and most highly recruited high school girls graduating in 2008. The game was the 7th annual version of the McDonald's All-American Game first played in 2002.

The 48 players were selected from 2,500 nominees by a committee of basketball experts. They were chosen not only for their on-court skills, but for their performances off the court as well. Coach Morgan Wootten, who had more than 1,200 wins as head basketball coach at DeMatha High School, was chairman of the selection committee. Legendary UCLA coach John Wooden, who has been involved in the McDonald's All American Games since its inception, served as chairman of the Games and as an advisor to the selection committee.

Proceeds from the 2008 McDonald's All American High School Basketball Games went to a local Ronald McDonald House Charities (RMHC) and its Ronald McDonald House program.

== 2008 game ==
The game was telecast live by ESPN. The All American Girls got the action started on a cold night in Milwaukee. The Bradley Center crowd seemed poised to watch an East Team, filled with an array of big name talent, dominate a smaller, lesser-known West Team. However, it was the West Team's shooting and team play that prevailed in the 80–64 victory and a commanding 5–2 series lead.

Brooklyn Pope (Rutgers) led a balanced attack for the West Team, as she tallied a team high 13 points. Teammates Tiffany Hayes (Connecticut), Nikki Speed (Rutgers) and Nnemkadi Ogwumike (Stanford) added 9 points each. Ashley Gayle (Texas) showcased her jumping ability, as she swatted an incredible six shots, which places her second all-time.

The East Squad's offensive attack was headed by Shekinna Stricklen (Tennessee) with a game high 17 points. The 2008 Morgan Wootten Player of the Year, Elena Delle Donne, contributed a double-double, as she netted 10 points and grabbed 11 rebounds. That rebound total places her in a tie for fifth place overall.

The 2008 John R. Wooden MVP Award went to co-recipients Nikki Speed and Brooklyn Pope, while LaSondra Barrett (LSU) took home the Naismith Award for Sportsmanship during the week's events.

=== 2008 East roster ===
ESPNW Rank 100	#	Name	Height	Weight (lbs.)	Position	Hometown	High School	College Choice
1	11	Elena Delle Donne	6-4	190	F	Wilmington, DE, U.S.	Ursuline Academy	Connecticut
4	10	Amber Gray	6-1	190	F	West Chester, OH, U.S.	Lakota West	Tennessee
3	25	Glory Johnson	6-2	175	F	Knoxville, TN, U.S.	Webb School of Knoxville	Tennessee
16	42	Shenise Johnson	5-11	160	F	Henrietta, NY, U.S.	Rush-Henrietta	Miami (FL)
5	55	Lynetta Kizer	6-3	217	C	Dumfries, VA, U.S.	Potomac	Maryland
40	34	Chelsey Lee	6-3	142	C	Miramar, FL, U.S.	Parkway Academy	Rutgers
15	23	Alicia Manning	6-1	170	G	Woodstock, GA, U.S.	Etowah	Tennessee
30	21	Samantha Prahalis	5-7	125	G	Commack, NY, U.S.	Commack	Ohio State
22	50	Chay Shegog	6-3	185	C	Stafford, VA, U.S.	Brooke Point	North Carolina
8	40	Shekinna Stricklen	6-2	160	G	Morrilton, AR, U.S.	Morrilton	Tennessee
2	24	April Sykes	6-1	187	G	Crawford, MS, U.S.	East Oktibbeha County	Rutgers
51	3	She'la White	5-6	135	G	Norfolk, VA, U.S.	Norfolk Collegiate School	North Carolina

=== 2008 West roster ===
ESPNW Rank 100	#	Name	Height	Weight (lbs.)	Position	Hometown	High School	College Choice
12	55	LaSondra Barrett	6-2	160	F	Jackson, MS, U.S.	Murrah	LSU
20	32	Alyssia Brewer	6-3	190	F	Sapulpa, OK, U.S.	Sapulpa	Tennessee
23	24	Ashley Corral	5-9	150	G	Vancouver, WA, U.S.	Prairie	USC
26	1	Jasmine Dixon	5-11	193	G	Long Beach, CA, U.S.	Long Beach Polytechnic	Rutgers
14	33	Ayana Dunning	6-3	220	C	Columbus, OH, U.S.	Eastmoor Academy	LSU
46	22	Ashley Gayle	6-4	180	C	Las Vegas, NV, U.S.	Bishop Gorman	Texas
28	15	Briana Gilbreath	6-1	145	G	Katy, TX, U.S.	Cinco Ranch	USC
11	3	Tiffany Hayes	6-0	134	G	Winter Haven, FL, U.S.	Winter Haven	Connecticut
17	25	Destini Hughes	5-10	140	G	Kennedale, TX, U.S.	Kennedale	LSU
6	30	Nneka Ogwumike	6-2	178	F	Cypress, TX, U.S.	Cy-Fair	Stanford
9	23	Brooklyn Pope	6-2	170	F	Fort Worth, TX, U.S.	Dunbar	Rutgers
27	11	Nikki Speed	5-9	135	G	Los Angeles, CA, U.S.	Marlborough	Rutgers

=== Coaches ===
The East team was coached by:

- Head Coach Sherri Retif of Germantown Academy (Fort Washington, Pennsylvania)
- Asst Coach Corry Irvin of Whitney Young High School (Chicago, Illinois)
- Asst Coach Caryn Jarocki of Highlands Ranch High School (Highlands Ranch, Colorado)

The West team was coached by:

- Head Coach Tom Klawitter of Parker High School (Janesville, Wisconsin)
- Asst Coach Heidi Bunek-Hamilton of Arrowhead High School (Hartland, Wisconsin)
- Asst Coach Jane Dooley of Parker High School (Janesville, Wisconsin)

=== Boxscore ===
==== Visitors: East ====
##	Player	FGM/A	3PM/A	FTM/A	Points	Off Reb	Def Reb	Tot Reb	PF	Ast	TO	BS	ST	Min
11	*Elena Delle Donne	5/14	0/ 3	0/ 0	10	4	7	11	3	0	1	2	0	27:36
21	*Samantha Prahalis	2/ 7	0/ 1	2/ 2	6	0	1	1	1	0	3	0	1	17:12
23	*Alicia Manning	2/ 8	0/ 0	1/ 2	5	3	3	6	0	0	1	0	1	17:36
25	*Glory Johnson	1/ 5	0/ 0	0/ 2	2	1	2	3	1	1	2	0	1	15:27
50	*Chay Shegog	3/10	0/ 0	0/ 1	6	4	3	7	1	0	4	0	2	17:57
3	She'la White	0/ 4	0/ 1	0/ 0	0	1	0	1	0	0	0	0	1	12:23
10	Amber Gray	2/ 6	0/ 2	2/ 4	6	1	4	5	2	1	1	1	0	17:49
24	April Sykes	1/ 7	0/ 3	2/ 3	4	1	1	2	3	1	2	0	2	12:33
34	Chelsey Lee	1/ 3	0/ 0	3/ 4	5	1	5	6	1	0	1	0	1	15:37
40	Shekinna Stricklen	6/15	1/ 7	4/ 6	17	2	2	4	1	1	2	0	3	20:24
42	Shenise Johnson	1/ 4	0/ 0	0/ 0	2	3	1	4	1	1	3	0	3	12:58
55	Lynnetta Kizer	0/ 3	0/ 0	1/ 2	1	2	2	4	0	0	3	3	1	12:23
	Team					3	3	6						
	TOTALS	24/86	1/17	15/26	64	26	34	60	14	5	23	6	16	199:55

==== Home: West ====
##	Player	FGM/A	3PM/A	FTM/A	Points	Off Reb	Def Reb	Tot Reb	PF	Ast	TO	BS	ST	Min
3	*Tiffany Hayes	4/ 9	0/ 2	1/ 3	9	0	3	3	1	2	2	0	2	17:33
11	*Nikki Speed	4/ 9	1/ 2	0/ 0	9	0	4	4	4	4	3	0	2	20:37
22	*Ashley Gayle	2/ 6	0/ 0	0/ 0	4	0	2	2	0	1	2	6	0	18:12
30	*Nneka Ogwumike	4/ 6	0/ 0	1/ 2	9	1	5	6	1	1	2	0	0	19:35
25	*Destini Hughes	2/ 4	1/ 1	0/ 0	5	3	1	4	4	1	2	0	1	16:14
1	Jasmine Dixon	4/ 6	0/ 0	0/ 2	8	1	4	5	2	3	1	0	2	14:45
15	Briana Gilbreath	3/ 6	2/ 3	0/ 0	8	1	1	2	1	2	0	1	0	15:50
23	Brooklyn Pope	5/11	0/ 2	3/ 6	13	2	2	4	3	0	2	0	0	14:45
24	Ashley Corral	1/ 8	1/ 4	0/ 0	3	0	2	2	2	1	3	0	0	15:18
32	Alyssia Brewer	1/ 4	0/ 0	0/ 0	2	0	3	3	3	0	2	0	2	16:18
33	Ayana Dunning	3/ 6	0/ 0	0/ 0	6	1	4	5	1	0	0	1	2	13:55
55	LaSondra Barrett	1/ 3	0/ 0	2/ 2	4	2	5	7	2	3	3	0	0	16:52
	Team					3	6	9			3			
	TOTALS	34/78	5/14	7/15	80	14	42	56	24	18	25	8	11	199:54

(* = Starting Line-up)

== All-American Week ==
=== Schedule ===
- Tuesday, March 25: Powerade JamFest
  - Three-Point Shoot-out
  - Timed Basketball Skills Competition
- Wednesday, March 26: 7th Annual Girls All-American Game

The Powerade JamFest is a skills-competition evening featuring basketball players who demonstrate their skills in two crowd-entertaining ways. Since the first All-American game in 2002, players have competed in a 3-point shooting challenge and a timed basketball skills competition.

=== Contest Winners ===
- The 2008 Timed Skills contest was won by Nneka Ogwumike.
- Ashley Corral was winner of the 2008 3-point shoot-out.

== See also ==
- 2008 McDonald's All-American Boys Game
