= Briana Gilbreath-Butler =

American basketball player (born 1990)

Personal information
- Born: August 16, 1990 (age 36) Houston, Texas, U.S.
- Listed height: 6 ft 0 in (1.83 m)
- Listed weight: 150 lb (68 kg)

Career information
- High school: Cinco Ranch (Katy, Texas)
- College: USC (2008–2012)
- WNBA draft: 2012: 3rd round, 35th overall pick
- Drafted by: Washington Mystics
- Position: Guard
- Number: 15, 14

Career history
- 2012–2013: Phoenix Mercury
- 2014: Connecticut Sun
- 2015: Indiana Fever

Career highlights
- Pac-12 Defensive Player of the Year (2010); 3× All-Pac-12 (2010–2012); 3× Pac-12 All-Defense (2010–2012); Third-team All-Pac-12 (2009); McDonald's All-American (2008)
- Stats at Basketball Reference

Briana Renee Gilbreath-Butler (née Gilbreath; born August 16, 1990) is an American former professional basketball guard who played for the Phoenix Mercury, Connecticut Sun, and Indiana Fever of the Women's National Basketball Association (WNBA). She played college basketball for the USC Trojans.

== Early life ==
Briana Renee Gilbreath was born on August 16, 1990, in Houston, Texas. She attended Cinco Ranch High School in Katy, Texas. She was a member of the 2007 USA Basketball Under-18 Olympic Junior Development Team. Gilbreath averaged 14.1 points, 8.1 rebounds, 4.7 assists, 4.0 steals, and 1.8 blocks per game as a senior, earning Parade third-team All-American and EA Sports first-team All-American accolades. She was named to the 2008 McDonald's All-American Girls Game.

== College career ==
Gilbreath played college basketball for the USC Trojans from 2008 to 2012. She played in 32 games her freshman year in 2008–09, averaging 10.5 points per game, 5.4 rebounds per game, 1.8 assists per game, and 1.6 steals per game while earning all-Pac-12 third-team, Pac-12 Rookie of the Year, and Pac-12 All-Freshman honors. She appeared in 31 games, all starts, during the 2009–10 season, averaging 12.7 points, 5.9 rebounds, 3.1 assists, 1.8 steals, and 1.5 blocks per game while also garnering Pac-12 Defensive Player of the Year, first-team All-Pac-12, and Pac-12 All-Defense recognition. Gilbreath played in 37 games, starting 36, in 2010–11, averaging 14.4 points, 7.3 rebounds, 2.8 assists, 2.5 steals, and 1.4 blocks per game, earning first-team All-Pac-12 and Pac-12 All-Defense accolades. She appeared in 28 games, starting 26, her senior year in 2011–12, averaging 12.3 points, 6.8 rebounds, 2.8 assists, 1.5 steals, and 1.5 blocks per game while garnering first-team All-Pac-12 and Pac-12 All-Defense honors for the third consecutive season. She majored in human performance at USC.

== Professional career ==
Gilbreath was selected by the Washington Mystics in the third round, with the 35th overall pick, of the 2012 WNBA draft. She signed with the team on April 25, 2012. She was waived by the Mystics on May 9.

Gilbreath signed with the Phoenix Mercury on August 22, 2012. She played in 11 games, starting two, for the Mercury during the 2012 season, averaging 7.0 points, 3.6 rebounds, and 1.1 assists per game.

She was signed by the Los Angeles Sparks on April 3, 2013. She was waived on May 20, 2013.

Gilbreath was re-signed by the Mercury on May 22, 2013. She appeared in all 34 games, starting 30, in 2013, averaging 4.4 points, 3.2 rebounds, and 1.5 assists. She also appeared in all five of the team's playoff games and started three of them. The Mercury finished the regular season with a 19–15 record and later lost in the conference finals to the Minnesota Lynx.

Gilbreath signed with the Connecticut Sun on July 7, 2014. She played in six games for the Sun during the 2014 season, totaling two points, five rebounds, one steal, and one block in 36 minutes.

She appeared in three games for the Indiana Fever in 2015, totaling two points, two rebounds, one steal, and one block in 23 minutes.

Gilbreath has also played professional basketball overseas, including in Belgium and Australia.

== Career statistics ==
Legend
GP	Games played	GS	Games started	MPG	Minutes per game	RPG	Rebounds per game
APG	Assists per game	SPG	Steals per game	BPG	Blocks per game	PPG	Points per game
TO	Turnovers per game	FG%	Field-goal percentage	3P%	3-point field-goal percentage	FT%	Free-throw percentage
**Bold**	Career best	°	League leader

=== WNBA ===
==== Regular season ====
WNBA regular season statistics
Year	Team	GP	GS	MPG	FG%	3P%	FT%	RPG	APG	SPG	BPG	TO	PPG
2012	Phoenix	11	2	**23.5**	.338	**.378**	**.789**	**3.6**	1.1	0.5	**0.5**	1.3	**7.0**
2013	Phoenix	**34**	**30**	22.4	**.395**	.255	.625	3.2	**1.5**	**0.7**	0.4	0.7	4.4
2014	Connecticut	6	0	6.0	.167	.000	—	0.8	0.0	0.2	0.2	**0.3**	0.3
2015	Indiana	3	0	7.7	.200	.000	—	0.7	0.0	0.3	0.3	**0.3**	0.7
**Career**	4 years, 3 teams	54	32	20.0	.368	.297	.698	2.9	1.1	0.6	0.4	0.8	4.2

==== Playoffs ====
WNBA playoff statistics
Year	Team	GP	GS	MPG	FG%	3P%	FT%	RPG	APG	SPG	BPG	TO	PPG
2013	Phoenix	5	3	20.6	.400	.000	.750	3.0	1.6	0.8	0.4	1.8	3.6
**Career**	1 year, 1 team	5	3	20.6	.400	.000	.750	3.0	1.6	0.8	0.4	1.8	3.6

== Personal life ==
Gilbreath married NFL player Brice Butler in 2014. Her father was a track and field athlete for the Arizona Wildcats.
