= Tanisha Wright =

American basketball player and coach (born 1983)

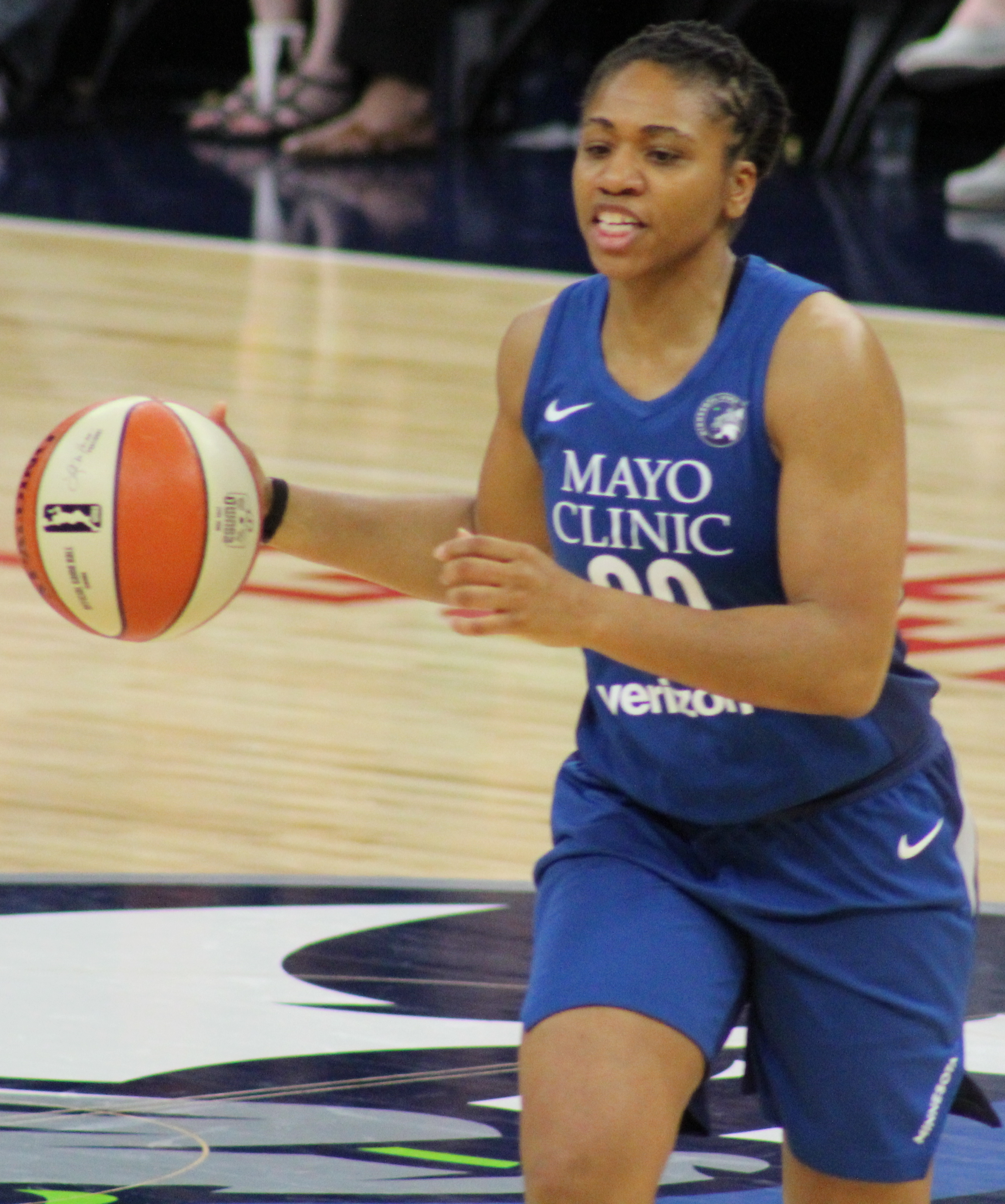
- Wright in 2018

Penn State Nittany Lions
- Title: Head coach
- League: Big Ten Conference

Personal information
- Born: November 29, 1983 (age 42) Brooklyn, New York, U.S.
- Listed height: 5 ft 11 in (1.80 m)
- Listed weight: 165 lb (75 kg)

Career information
- High school: West Mifflin (West Mifflin, Pennsylvania)
- College: Penn State (2001–2005)
- WNBA draft: 2005: 1st round, 12th overall pick
- Drafted by: Seattle Storm
- Playing career: 2005–2019
- Position: Shooting guard
- Number: 30

Career history

Playing
- 2005–2014: Seattle Storm
- 2015–2016: New York Liberty
- 2018: Minnesota Lynx
- 2019: New York Liberty

Coaching
- 2017–2021: Charlotte (assistant)
- 2020–2021: Las Vegas Aces (assistant)
- 2022–2024: Atlanta Dream
- 2025: Chicago Sky (assistant)
- 2026–present: Penn State

Career highlights
- WNBA champion (2010); 5× WNBA All-Defensive First Team (2009–2011, 2013, 2014); EuroCup Women (2011); Israeli championship (2011); Israeli State Cup (2011); 2× WNBA All-Defensive Second Team (2015, 2016); Polish National League champion (2010); Israeli National League champion (2011); Third-team All-American – AP (2005); All-American – USBWA (2005); 3× Big Ten Defensive Player of the Year (2003–2005); 3× First-team All-Big Ten (2003–2005)
- Stats at WNBA.com
- Stats at Basketball Reference

Tanisha Lovely Wright (born November 29, 1983) is an American professional basketball coach and former player who is the head coach for the Penn State Nittany Lions. She played college basketball at Penn State. During her junior season, Wright helped led her team to the Elite Eight, where they fell to the eventual national champion, Connecticut. She ranks fourth in school history in points scored with 1,995 points in 134 career games. She was selected 12th overall in the 2005 WNBA draft by the Seattle Storm. Wright played in the WNBA for 14 seasons with the Storm, New York Liberty and Minnesota Lynx.

Wright began her coaching career as an assistant coach at Charlotte while still playing in the WNBA. After her retirement, she served as an assistant coach for the Las Vegas Aces from 2020 to 2021. After the 2021 WNBA season, Wright was named the head coach of the Atlanta Dream, a position she held until 2024.

== High school career ==
Born in West Mifflin, she attended the suburban Pittsburgh West Mifflin Area High School, where she played basketball and soccer. She led the team to the W.P.I.A.L (Western Pennsylvania Interscholastic Athletic League) basketball district finals in her junior year. The team lost a close game 81–78 to Blackhawk High School in Triple Overtime. Tanisha fouled out in the beginning of the final overtime. She led the game with 51 points. She went on to lead her team to the next seasons finals once again against Blackhawk, where she led the team in a 63–53 victory. She went on to take her team to the state finals, where they lost a close game to Allentown Central Catholic high school 56–45. The team's record was 31–1, their only loss coming in the state finals.

== College career ==
=== Penn State statistics ===
Year	Team	GP	Points	FG%	3P%	FT%	RPG	APG	SPG	BPG	PPG
2001-02	Penn State	35	355	45.4	10.5	78.2	4.0	2.8	1.8	0.6	10.1
2002-03	Penn State	35	560	50.7	25.0	76.2	5.4	4.0	2.6	0.5	16.0
2003-04	Penn State	34	502	48.3	25.0	83.2	4.7	4.1	1.7	0.3	14.8
2004-05	Penn State	30	578	41.4	20.0	80.3	4.5	3.6	1.9	0.4	19.3
Career	Penn State	134	1995	46.3	20.0	79.5	4.6	3.6	2.0	0.5	14.9

== WNBA career ==
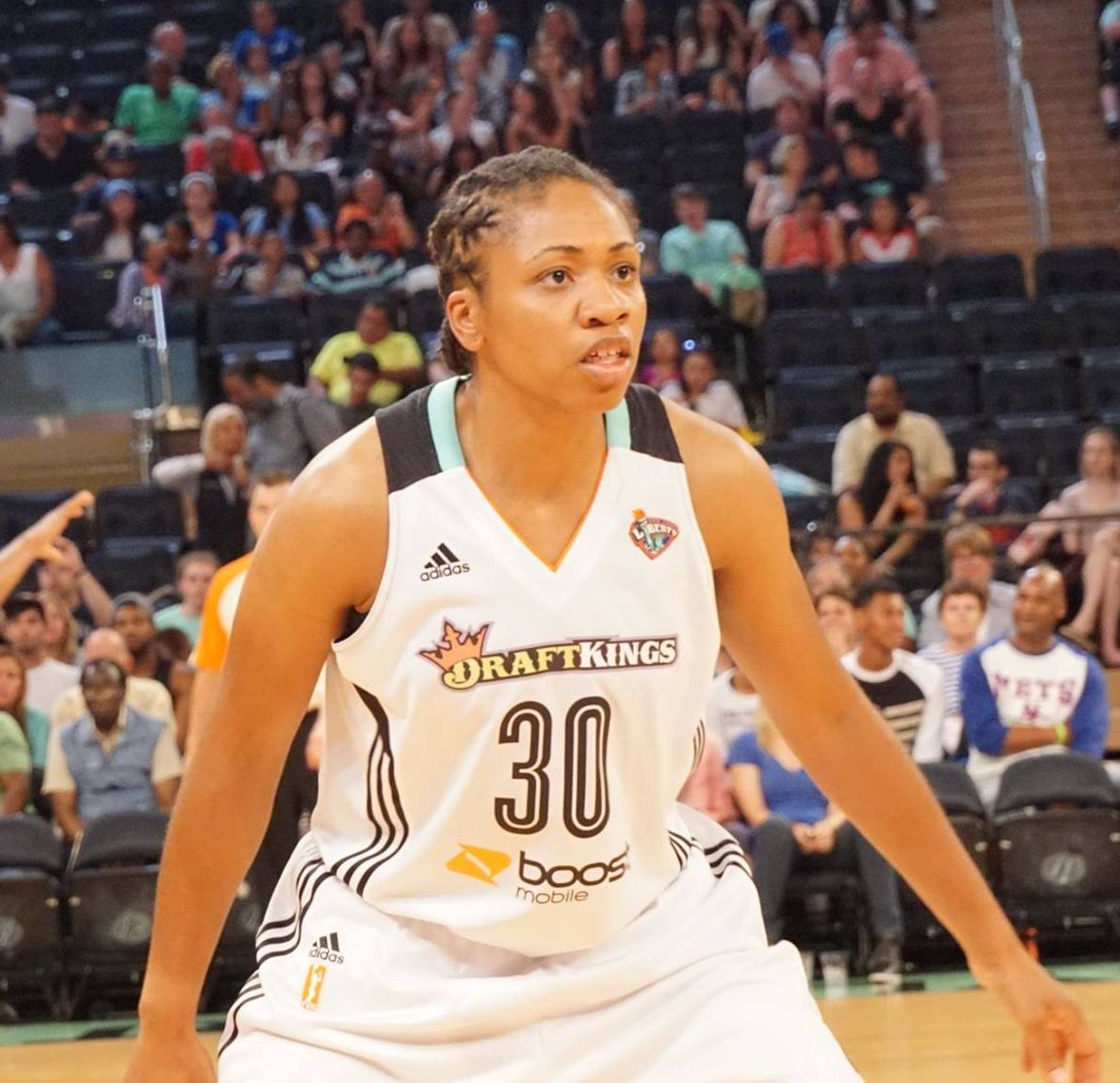
Wright at Madison Square Garden in 2015

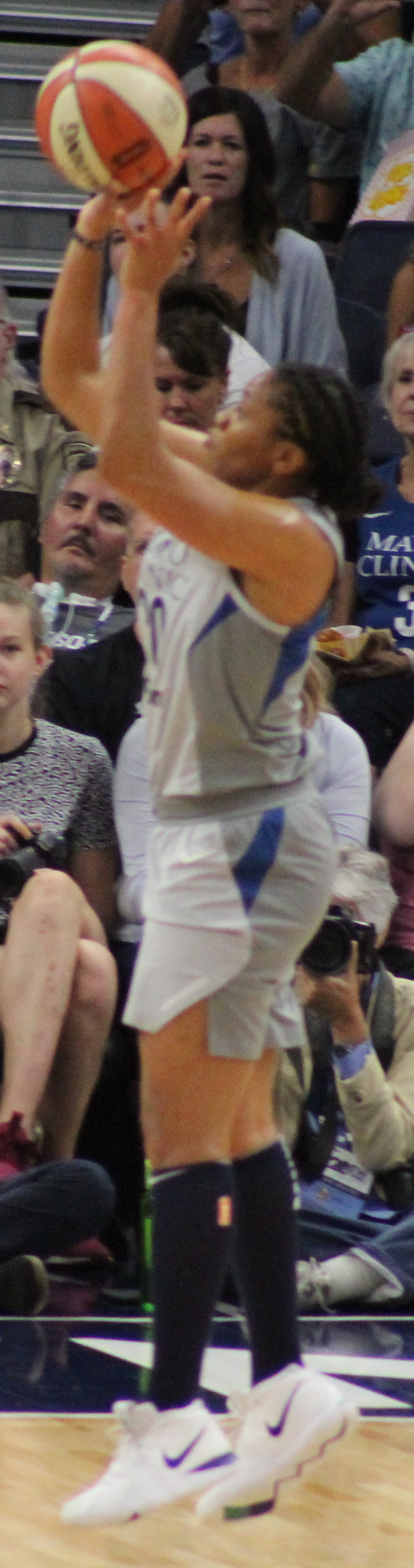
Wright in 2018

Wright helped the Seattle Storm win their second championship in 2010.

On February 2, 2015, Wright signed as a free agent with the New York Liberty

In 2017, it was announced that Wright would be sitting out part of the 2017 WNBA season to rest.

On March 13, 2018, Wright signed a free agent contract with the Minnesota Lynx.

Wright was traded back to the New York Liberty on April 11, 2019, in exchange for a second-round draft pick in the 2020 WNBA draft. Following the 2019 season, Wright announced her retirement.

== Coaching career ==
Wright began her coaching career while still playing in the WNBA as an assistant at the University of North Carolina at Charlotte 49ers in 2017.

The Las Vegas Aces announced the hiring of Wright as an assistant coach in 2020. Wright was known as a defensive specialist and helped coach the Aces into one of the league's best defensive teams.

On October 12, 2021, Wright was announced as the head coach of the Atlanta Dream. On October 2, 2024, the Dream announced that it had parted ways with Wright.

On January 4, 2025, Wright was named an assistant coach for the Chicago Sky under head coach Tyler Marsh.

== WNBA career statistics ==
Legend
GP	Games played	GS	Games started	MPG	Minutes per game	RPG	Rebounds per game
APG	Assists per game	SPG	Steals per game	BPG	Blocks per game	PPG	Points per game
TO	Turnovers per game	FG%	Field-goal percentage	3P%	3-point field-goal percentage	FT%	Free-throw percentage
**Bold**	Career best	°	League leader

†	Denotes seasons in which Wright won a WNBA championship

=== Regular season ===
Year	Team	GP	GS	MPG	FG%	3P%	FT%	RPG	APG	SPG	BPG	TO	PPG
2005	Seattle	**34**	8	15.5	.462	.000	.667	1.7	1.6	0.5	0.1	1.2	3.6
2006	Seattle	33	0	15.4	.353	.143	.844	1.8	1.2	0.3	0.1	1.6	3.8
2007	Seattle	**34**	5	16.1	.400	.273	.846	1.3	2.0	0.9	0.1	1.6	4.1
2008	Seattle	**34**	14	23.8	.432	.167	.787	3.4	2.5	0.9	0.2	2.3	7.9
2009	Seattle	33	33	**32.5**	.463	.267	**.906**	3.5	3.9	**1.5**	**0.3**	2.6	**12.2**
2010^{†}	Seattle	**34**	**34**	29.1	.410	**.411**	.844	3.3	**4.5**	1.2	**0.3**	2.1	9.2
2011	Seattle	33	32	28.9	**.492**	.367	.897	3.2	2.9	1.2	0.0	2.7	10.1
2012	Seattle	32	32	29.8	.373	.192	.859	3.0	4.4	1.2	0.1	2.7	7.9
2013	Seattle	**34**	**34**	30.9	.440	.283	.855	**3.7**	4.1	1.1	0.2	2.9	11.9
2014	Seattle	29	29	25.5	.417	.278	.795	2.3	3.6	0.9	0.1	2.1	8.0
2015	New York	**34**	**34**	23.7	.420	.364	.845	2.4	3.5	0.8	0.1	2.1	7.4
2016	New York	29	28	23.0	.401	.235	.717	2.3	3.6	0.9	0.2	2.3	6.7
2018	Minnesota	33	4	17.8	.383	.396	.741	1.6	2.0	0.5	0.1	1.3	4.3
2019	New York	31	17	19.8	.415	.368	.806	2.8	4.1	1.0	**0.3**	1.8	4.7
Career	14 years, 3 teams	457	304	23.7	.424	.308	.833	2.6	3.1	0.9	0.2	2.1	7.3

=== Playoffs ===
Year	Team	GP	GS	MPG	FG%	3P%	FT%	RPG	APG	SPG	BPG	TO	PPG
2005	Seattle	3	0	12.7	.200	.000	**1.000**	1.7	2.3	1.0	0.0	0.7	3.0
2006	Seattle	2	0	6.0	.000	.000	.000	0.0	0.5	0.0	0.0	1.0	0.0
2007	Seattle	2	0	21.0	.467	.000	**1.000**	2.5	2.5	0.5	**0.5**	3.0	9.0
2008	Seattle	3	3	34.3	.412	.500	.750	**5.7**	2.7	**2.0**	0.0	3.7	13.7
2009	Seattle	3	3	32.7	.342	.250	**1.000**	5.3	5.3	1.7	0.0	3.0	11.7
2010^{†}	Seattle	**7**	**7**	28.7	.446	.357	.571	2.6	2.9	1.3	0.1	2.7	9.6
2011	Seattle	3	3	28.0	.588	**.600**	.833	4.0	2.3	1.7	0.3	3.0	18.7
2012	Seattle	3	3	**37.3**	.462	.400	.889	3.7	**6.0**	1.0	0.0	2.3	11.3
2013	Seattle	2	2	35.0	.583	.333	.000	2.0	3.0	**2.0**	0.0	3.0	14.5
2015	New York	6	6	27.3	.516	.500	.714	2.7	3.8	1.5	0.0	1.7	6.5
2016	New York	1	1	28.0	**.714**	.333	.000	1.0	5.0	0.0	0.0	4.0	**21.0**
2018	Minnesota	1	0	23.0	.333	.000	.000	3.0	2.0	0.0	0.0	2.0	4.0
Career	12 years, 3 teams	36	28	27.1	.469	.388	.776	3.0	3.3	1.3	0.1	2.4	9.8

== Head coaching record ==
Legend
Regular season	G	Games coached	W	Games won	L	Games lost	W–L %	Win–loss %
Playoffs	PG	Playoff games	PW	Playoff wins	PL	Playoff losses	PW–L %	Playoff win–loss %

Team	Year	G	W	L	W–L%	Finish	PG	PW	PL	PW–L%	Result
Atlanta	2022	36	14	22	.389	5th in Eastern	—	—	—	—	Missed playoffs
Atlanta	2023	40	19	21	.475	3rd in Eastern	2	0	2	.000	Lost in 1st Round
Atlanta	2024	40	15	25	.375	4th in Eastern	2	0	2	.000	Lost in 1st Round
Career		116	48	68	.414		4	0	4	.000	

Record table
Season	Team	Overall	Conference	Standing	Postseason
Penn State Nittany Lions (Big Ten) (2026–present)
2026-27	Penn State	0–0	0–0		
Penn State:		0–0 (–)	0–0 (–)		
Total:		0–0 (–)			

== Overseas career ==
Seasons	Team	Country
2007–2008	Hapoel Tel Aviv B.C.	Israel
2008–2009	Tarbes GB	France
2009–2010	Lotos VBW Clima Gdynia	Poland
2010–2011	Elitzur Ramla	Israel
2013–2015; 2016–present	Abdullah Gul University Kayseri	Turkey

== See also ==
- List of WNBA career assists leaders
