= Dymond Simon =

American basketball player (born 1989)

Personal information
- Born: September 29, 1989 (age 37) Phoenix, Arizona
- Listed height: 5 ft 5 in (1.65 m)
- Listed weight: 137 lb (62 kg)

Career information
- High school: St. Mary's (Phoenix, Arizona)
- College: Arizona State (2006–2011)
- WNBA draft: 2011: undrafted
- Position: Point guard

Career history
- 2012: Phoenix Mercury

Career highlights
- First-team All Pac-10 (2011); Pac-12 All-Freshman Team (2007); McDonald's All-American (2006)
- Stats at WNBA.com
- Stats at Basketball Reference

Dymond Simon (born September 29, 1989) is a professional basketball player, most recently for the Phoenix Mercury of the Women's National Basketball Association.

== Career statistics ==
Legend
GP	Games played	GS	Games started	MPG	Minutes per game	RPG	Rebounds per game
APG	Assists per game	SPG	Steals per game	BPG	Blocks per game	PPG	Points per game
TO	Turnovers per game	FG%	Field-goal percentage	3P%	3-point field-goal percentage	FT%	Free-throw percentage
**Bold**	Career best	°	League leader

=== WNBA ===
WNBA regular season statistics
Year	Team	GP	GS	MPG	FG%	3P%	FT%	RPG	APG	SPG	BPG	TO	PPG
2012	Phoenix	8	0	12.1	28.9	12.5	100.0	1.5	1.9	0.5	0.0	1.8	3.8
**Career**	1 year, 1 team	8	0	12.1	28.9	12.5	100.0	1.5	1.9	0.5	0.0	1.8	3.8

=== College ===
NCAA statistics
Year	Team	GP	Points	FG%	3P%	FT%	RPG	APG	SPG	BPG	PPG
2006–07	Arizona State	20	187	**47.8**	**40.0**	62.2	1.7	1.9	1.6	–	9.4
2007–08	Arizona State	**30**	248	35.6	25.0	75.9	1.4	1.9	0.7	–	8.3
2008–09	Arizona State	29	**399**	39.5	38.1	**88.2**	**1.9**	**3.3**	1.3	–	**13.8**
2009–10	Arizona State	Did not play (redshirt)									
2010–11	Arizona State	29	382	34.4	26.7	80.6	1.8	2.7	1.3	0.0	13.2
**Career**		108	1216	38.2	30.5	80.1	1.7	2.5	1.2	0.0	11.3
