= 2012 Phoenix Mercury season =

Women's National Basketball Association-16th Phoenix Mercury

- Coach: Corey Gaines
- Arena: US Airways Center
- Attendance: per game

Results
- Record: 7–27 (.206)
- Place: 6th (Western)
- Playoff finish: Did not qualify

Media
- Television: FS-A; ESPN2, NBATV

The 2012 WNBA season was the 16th season for the Phoenix Mercury of the Women's National Basketball Association. Until the 2023 Season, this was last time the Mercury missed the playoffs.

== Transactions ==
=== WNBA draft ===
The following are the Mercury's selections in the 2012 WNBA draft.

Round	Pick	Player	Nationality	School/team/country
1	6	Samantha Prahalis	United States	Ohio State
2	24 (from Minn.)	C'eria Ricketts	United States	Arkansas
3	30	Christine Flores	United States	Missouri
3	33 (from Conn.)	Amanda Johnson	United States	Oregon

=== Transaction log ===
- April 11, 2011: The Mercury acquired a third-round pick in the 2012 Draft from the Connecticut Sun in exchange for Tahnee Robinson's draft rights.
- January 12: The Mercury traded Temeka Johnson to the Tulsa Shock in exchange for Andrea Riley.
- February 2: The Mercury acquired Alexis Hornbuckle from the Minnesota Lynx in exchange for a second-round pick in the 2013 Draft.
- February 9: The Mercury signed Chastity Reed.
- February 28: The Mercury traded the 18th pick in the 2012 Draft to the Minnesota Lynx in exchange for Charde Houston and the 24th pick in the 2012 Draft.
- April 11: The Mercury signed Zane Tamane and Brittney Thomas.
- April 13: The Mercury signed Dymond Simon.
- April 13: The Mercury announced Marie Ferdinand-Harris' retirement.
- April 26: The Mercury signed Avery Warley.
- May 2: The Mercury signed draft picks Christine Flores, Amanda Johnson, Samantha Prahalis, and C'eira Ricketts.
- May 3: The Mercury waived Brittney Thomas.
- May 8: The Mercury waived C'eira Ricketts and Christine Flores.
- May 16: The Mercury waived Chastity Reed, Dymond Simon, Krystal Thomas, and Amanda Johnson.
- May 25: The Mercury signed Krystal Thomas and waived Zane Tamane.
- June 2: The Mercury signed Andrea Riley.
- July 1: The Mercury waived Andrea Riley.
- July 5: The Mercury signed Lynetta Kizer to a seven-day contract.

=== Trades ===
Date	Trade	
January 12, 2012	To Phoenix Mercury	To Tulsa Shock
January 12, 2012	Andrea Riley	Temeka Johnson
February 2, 2012	To Phoenix Mercury	To Minnesota Lynx
February 2, 2012	Alexis Hornbuckle	Second-round pick in 2013 Draft
February 28, 2012	To Phoenix Mercury	To Minnesota Lynx
February 28, 2012	Charde Houston and the 24th pick in the 2012 Draft	18th pick in the 2012 Draft

=== Personnel changes ===
==== Additions ====
Player	Signed	Former team
Alexis Hornbuckle	February 2, 2012	Minnesota Lynx
Charde Houston	February 28, 2012	Minnesota Lynx
Samantha Prahalis	April 16, 2012	draft pick
Avery Warley	April 26, 2012	free agent
Lynetta Kizer	July 5, 2012	free agent

==== Subtractions ====
Player	Left	New team
Temeka Johnson	January 12, 2012	Tulsa Shock
Sidney Spencer	February 28, 2012	free agent
Ketia Swanier	March 1, 2012	Atlanta Dream
Marie Ferdinand-Harris	April 13, 2012	retired
Alexis Gray-Lawson	September 1, 2012	free agent

== Roster ==
2012 Phoenix Mercury roster
Players
Coaches

Pos.	No.	Nat.	Name	Height	Weight	DOB	From	Yrs
G/F	24	(United States)	Bonner, DeWanna	6' 4" (1.93m)	137 lb (62kg)	1987-08-21	Auburn	3
F	4	(United States)	Dupree, Candice	6' 2" (1.88m)	175 lb (79kg)	1984-08-16	Temple	6
G	14	(United States)	Hornbuckle, Alexis	5' 10" (1.78m)	155 lb (70kg)	1985-10-16	Tennessee	4
F	22	(United States)	Houston, Charde	6' 0" (1.83m)	189 lb (86kg)	1986-04-10	Connecticut	4
C	12	(United States)	Kizer, Lynetta	6' 4" (1.93m)		1990-04-04	Maryland	R
G	99	(United States)	Prahalis, Samantha	5' 7" (1.7m)	129 lb (59kg)	1990-01-23	Ohio State	R
F/C	43	(United States)	Sanford, Nakia	6' 4" (1.93m)	195 lb (88kg)	1976-05-10	Kansas	9
G	1	(United States)	Simon, Dymond	5' 5" (1.65m)	137 lb (62kg)	1989-09-29	Arizona State	R
G	3	(United States)	Taurasi, Diana	6' 0" (1.83m)	163 lb (74kg)	1982-06-11	Connecticut	8
F	13	(Australia)	Taylor, Penny (injured)	6' 1" (1.85m)	165 lb (75kg)	1981-05-24	Australia	10
F/C	34	(United States)	Thomas, Krystal	6' 5" (1.96m)	195 lb (88kg)	1989-06-10	Duke	1

Head coach
(United States) Corey Gaines (Loyola Marymount)
Assistant coaches
(United States) Earl Cureton (Detroit Mercy)
(United States) Julie Hairgrove (Arizona)
Athletic trainer
(United States) Tamara Poole (Cal State Dominguez Hills)

Legend

- (C) Team captain
- (DP) Unsigned draft pick
- (FA) Free agent
- (S) Suspended
- Injured

=== Depth ===
Pos.	Starter	Bench
C	Nakia Sanford	Krystal Thomas; Lynetta Kizer
PF	Candice Dupree	Avery Warley
SF	DeWanna Bonner	Charde Houston; Penny Taylor
SG	Diana Taurasi
PG	Samantha Prahalis	Alexis Hornbuckle

== Season standings ==
Western Conference	W	L	PCT	GB	Home	Road	Conf.
Minnesota Lynx ^{z}	27	7	.794	–	16–1	11–6	17–5
Los Angeles Sparks ^{x}	24	10	.706	3.0	16–1	8–9	15–7
San Antonio Silver Stars ^{x}	21	13	.618	6.0	12–5	9–8	14–8
Seattle Storm ^{x}	16	18	.471	11.0	10–7	6–11	11–11
Tulsa Shock ^{o}	9	25	.265	18.0	6–11	3–14	5–17
Phoenix Mercury ^{o}	7	27	.206	20.0	3–14	4–13	4–18

== Schedule ==
=== Preseason ===
2012 Game Log: Preseason (May)

Game	Date	Time (ET)	Opponent	TV	Score	High points	High rebounds	High assists	Location/Attendance	Record
1	Tue 8	10:00	Japan		102-73	Gray-Lawson (34)	Tamane; Warley (13)	Prahalis (7)	US Airways Center; 2,752	1-0

=== Regular season ===
2012 Game Log: Regular Season
May (1–3)

Game	Date	Time (ET)	Opponent	TV	Score	High points	High rebounds	High assists	Location/Attendance	Record
1	Sun 20	12:30	@ Minnesota	ABC	83-105	Houston (24)	Sanford (6)	Prahalis (6)	Target Center; 12,611	0-1
2	Tue 22	8:00	@ Tulsa		89-87	Dupree (31)	Dupree (9)	Prahalis (7)	BOK Center; 5,341	1-1
3	Sat 26	10:00	Los Angeles	FS-A+ KDOC	88-99	Dupree (24)	Warley (9)	Taurasi (4)	US Airways Center; 10,200	1-2
4	Thu 31	7:00	@ Atlanta	FS-A; SSO	65-81	Bonner (22)	Bonner (10)	Prahalis (6)	Philips Arena; 4,887	1-3

June (3–6)

Game	Date	Time (ET)	Opponent	TV	Score	High points	High rebounds	High assists	Location/Attendance	Record
5	Fri 1	8:00	@ San Antonio		66-85	Bonner; Dupree (17)	Dupree (10)	Prahalis (9)	AT&T Center; 6,534	1-4
6	Sun 3	6:00	Tulsa		79-72	Bonner (23)	Bonner (13)	Prahalis (6)	US Airways Center; 7,178	2-4
7	Fri 8	11:00	@ Los Angeles	TWC101	74-90	Houston (22)	Bonner; Gray-Lawson (6)	Prahalis (6)	Staples Center; 11,198	2-5
8	Fri 15	10:00	Minnesota		60-78	Bonner (18)	Dupree (10)	Prahalis (4)	US Airways Center; 7,394	2-6
9	Sun 17	4:00	@ Tulsa		75-87	Bonner (24)	Bonner (9)	Prahalis (6)	BOK Center; 4,200	2-7
10	Wed 20	10:00	Washington		80-77	Bonner (19)	Warley (9)	Bonner; Prahalis (3)	US Airways Center; 5,751	3-7
11	Sat 23	8:00	Los Angeles	ESPN	84-93	Bonner (24)	Thomas (11)	Prahalis (5)	US Airways Center; 9,670	3-8
12	Wed 27	8:00	@ Minnesota	FS-A+	80-96	Bonner (23)	Bonner; Warley (7)	Prahalis (3)	Target Center; 9,674	3-9
13	Fri 29	8:30	@ Chicago	CN100	84-81	Bonner (27)	Thomas (11)	Houston; Prahalis (4)	Allstate Arena; 5,488	4-9

July (0–6)

Game	Date	Time (ET)	Opponent	TV	Score	High points	High rebounds	High assists	Location/Attendance	Record
14	Sun 1	4:00	@ Washington	CSN-MA	77-90	Houston (26)	Bonner; Thomas (8)	Prahalis (5)	Verizon Center; 10,789	4-10
15	Tue 3	8:00	@ San Antonio	NBATV	81-82	Bonner (38)	Bonner; Thomas (8)	Prahalis (5)	AT&T Center; 6,912	4-11
16	Sat 7	10:00	Atlanta		93-100 (2OT)	Bonner (27)	Bonner (15)	Hornbuckle; Prahalis; Thomas (4)	US Airways Center; 7,948	4-12
17	Sun 8	9:00	@ Seattle		68-83	Bonner (12)	Warley (13)	Bonner (3)	KeyArena; 8,639	4-13
18	Tue 10	3:30	Los Angeles	FS-A	71-90	Bonner; Prahalis (14)	5 players (7)	Hornbuckle (3)	US Airways Center; 9,336	4-14
19	Fri 13	10:00	Seattle		64-83	Bonner (18)	Hornbuckle (8)	Hornbuckle (5)	US Airways Center; 7,647	4-15
Summer Olympic break

August (1–4)

Game	Date	Time (ET)	Opponent	TV	Score	High points	High rebounds	High assists	Location/Attendance	Record
Summer Olympic break
20	Thu 16	10:00	@ Seattle	KONG	58-72	Prahalis (15)	Thomas (11)	Bonner (4)	KeyArena; 6,987	4-16
21	Sun 19	6:00	San Antonio	FS-A; FS-SW	47-89	Hornbuckle (11)	Hornbuckle; Thomas (7)	Prahalis (4)	US Airways Center; 10,656	4-17
22	Thu 23	10:00	New York		77-89	Bonner (34)	Thomas (14)	Prahalis (4)	US Airways Center; 7.039	4-18
23	Sat 25	10:00	Indiana		72-85	Taurasi (19)	Bonner; Thomas; Warley (9)	Bonner; Taurasi (3)	US Airways Center; 9,079	4-19
24	Thu 30	10:00	@ Seattle	KONG	75-68	Bonner (24)	Bonner (11)	Prahalis (6)	KeyArena; 6,379	5-19

September (2–8)

Game	Date	Time (ET)	Opponent	TV	Score	High points	High rebounds	High assists	Location/Attendance	Record
25	Sat 1	10:00	San Antonio	NBATV	94-90	Taurasi (25)	Bonner (9)	Prahalis (5)	US Airways Center; 5,964	6-19
26	Wed 5	7:00	@ New York	NBATV; MSG	59-87	Bonner (20)	Hornbuckle; Gilbreath (7)	Hornbuckle (5)	Prudential Center; 4,732	6-20
27	Fri 7	7:00	@ Connecticut	CPTV-S	91-82	Bonner (35)	Thomas (16)	Hornbuckle (5)	Mohegan Sun Arena; 8,379	7-20
28	Sun 9	6:00	@ Indiana	NBATV; FS-A+ FS-I	83-89	Bonner (23)	Hornbuckle (9)	Bonner (5)	Bankers Life Fieldhouse; 7,971	7-21
29	Wed 12	10:00	Connecticut	ESPN2; CPTV-S	78-100	Bonner (24)	Bonner (10)	Simon (4)	US Airways Center; 5,421	7-22
30	Fri 14	10:00	Tulsa		84-92	Kizer (19)	Thomas (11)	Simon (6)	US Airways Center; 6,719	7-23
31	Sun 16	6:00	Chicago	NBATV; CN100	55-86	Houston (15)	Thomas (13)	Houston (3)	US Airways Center; 8,044	7-24
32	Tue 18	10:30	@ Los Angeles	NBATV; TWC101	76-101	Bonner (23)	Thomas (11)	Bonner (6)	Staples Center; 8,579	7-25
33	Fri 21	10:00	Minnesota	NBATV; FS-A+	66-89	Bonner (17)	Thomas (11)	Prahalis (8)	US Airways Center; 7,217	7-26
34	Sun 23	3:00	Seattle	ESPN2	57-71	Bonner (13)	Thomas (18)	Prahalis (6)	US Airways Center; 7,576	7-27

All games are viewable on WNBA LiveAccess or ESPN3.com

== Statistics ==
Legend
GP	Games played	GS	Games started	MPG	Minutes per game	RPG	Rebounds per game
APG	Assists per game	SPG	Steals per game	BPG	Blocks per game	PPG	Points per game
FG%	Field-goal percentage	3P%	3-point field-goal percentage	FT%	Free-throw percentage	TO	Turnovers per game
PF	Fouls per game		Team leader		League leader

=== Regular season ===
Player	GP	GS	MPG	FG%	3P%	FT%	RPG	APG	SPG	BPG	PPG
