= Krystal Thomas =

American basketball player (born 1989)

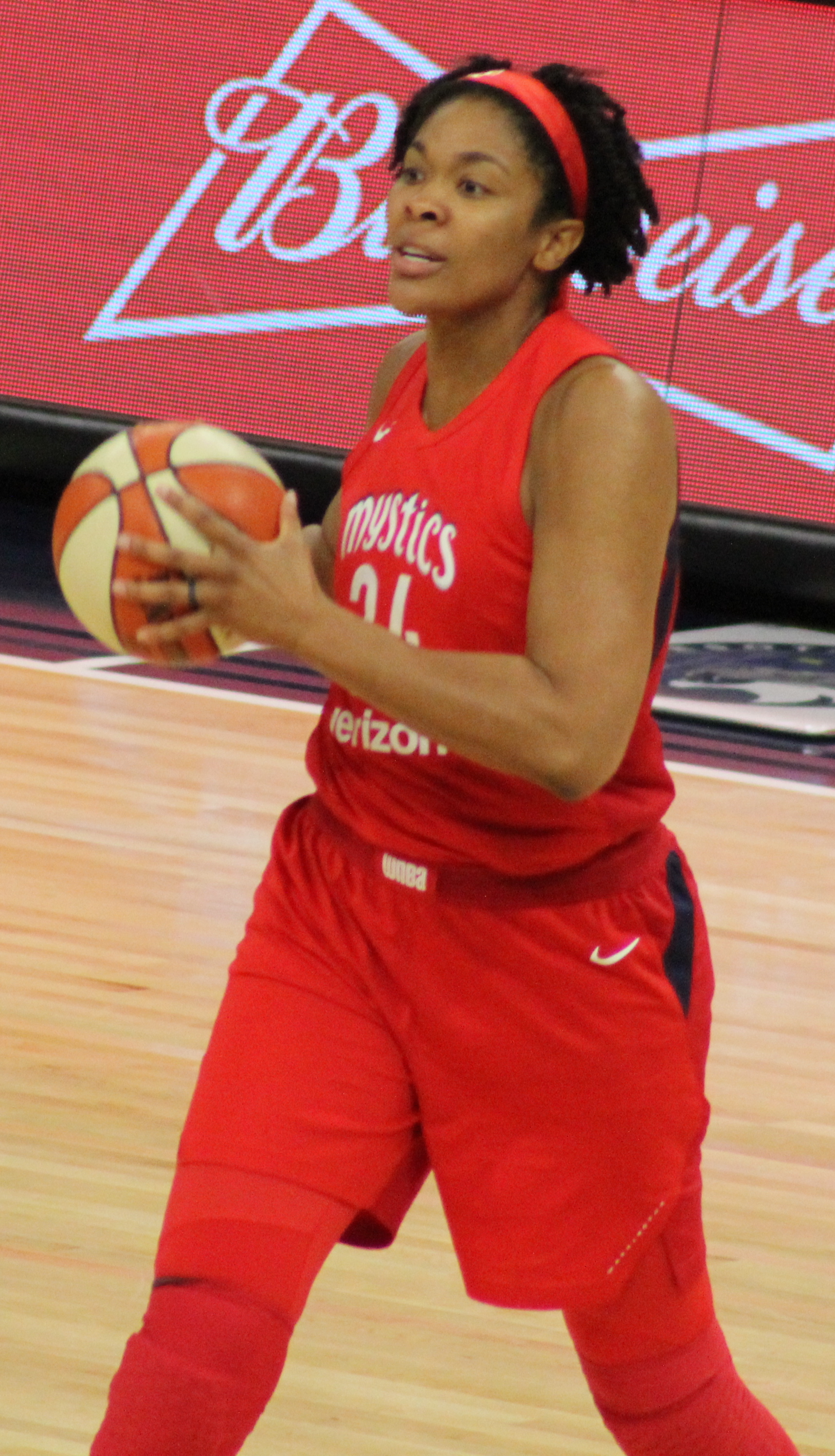
- Thomas in 2018

Personal information
- Born: June 10, 1989 (age 37) Orlando, Florida, U.S.
- Listed height: 6 ft 5 in (1.96 m)
- Listed weight: 210 lb (95 kg)

Career information
- High school: The First Academy (Orlando, Florida)
- College: Duke (2007–2011)
- WNBA draft: 2011: 3rd round, 36th overall pick
- Drafted by: Seattle Storm
- Playing career: 2011–2018
- Position: Center

Career history
- 2011: Seattle Storm
- 2011–2013: Phoenix Mercury
- 2011–2012: Union Lyon Basket Feminin
- 2012–2013: Jiangsu Phonenix
- 2013–2014: Perfumerias Avenida
- 2014: Indiana Fever
- 2016: Seattle Storm
- 2017–2018: Washington Mystics
- 2017–2018: Mersin BBSK

Career highlights
- Queen's Cup winner (2014); McDonald's All-American (2007)
- Stats at WNBA.com
- Stats at Basketball Reference
Medals
Women's basketball
Representing the United States
FIBA Under-19 World Cup
Gold medal – first place	2007 Slovakia	Team

Krystal Thomas (born June 10, 1989) is an American former professional basketball player in the Women's National Basketball Association (WNBA).

== USA Basketball ==
Thomas was selected as a member of the USA Women's U19 team which won the gold medal at the FIBA U19 World Championship in Bratislava, Slovakia. The event was held in July and August 2007, when the USA team defeated Sweden to win the championship. She averaged 7.8 points per game.

== Duke statistics ==
Legend
GP	Games played	GS	Games started	MPG	Minutes per game
FG%	Field goal percentage	3P%	3-point field goal percentage	FT%	Free throw percentage
RPG	Rebounds per game	APG	Assists per game	SPG	Steals per game
BPG	Blocks per game	PPG	Points per game	**Bold**	Career high

Year	Team	GP	Points	FG%	3P%	FT%	RPG	APG	SPG	BPG	PPG
2007-08	Duke	30	130	46.4	-	61.9	3.5	0.4	0.5	1.2	4.3
2008-09	Duke	33	142	42.4	-	**66.7**	4.0	0.2	0.3	1.0	4.3
2009-10	Duke	**36**	264	**50.3**	-	57.1	6.6	0.8	0.6	**1.9**	7.3
2010-11	Duke	**36**	**275**	47.2	-	54.8	**8.3**	**1.2**	**1.1**	1.6	**7.6**
Career	Duke	135	811	47.1		58.9	5.7	0.7	0.6	1.5	6.0

== Professional career ==
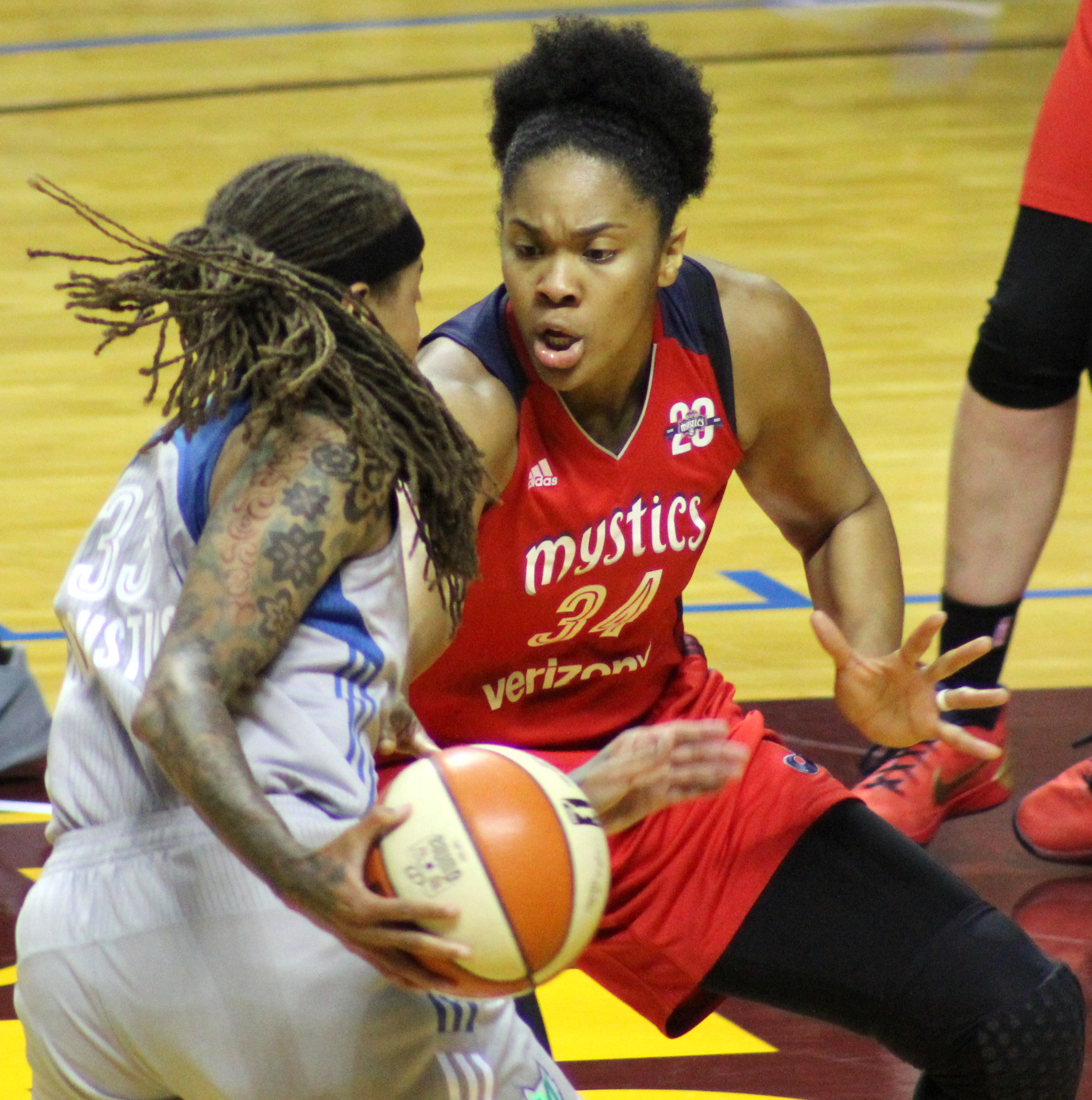
Thomas guarding Seimone Augustus, 2017 WNBA Semifinals

=== WNBA ===
Thomas was selected in the third round of the 2011 WNBA draft (36th overall) by the Seattle Storm. After 7 games played with the Storm, she was waived and then signed with the Phoenix Mercury.

In her second season with the Mercury, she averaged career-highs in scoring and rebounding and set franchise records for most consecutive double-digit rebound games and most offensive rebounds in a season.

In 2014, Thomas was waived by the Mercury and then signed with the Indiana Fever.

After becoming a free agent in 2015, she opted to sit out the entire season and took an assistant coach job offer from Grand Canyon University.

In 2016, Thomas signed a training camp contract with the Storm but was waived before the start of the season. Eventually the Storm would re-acquire Thomas one month into the 2016 season.

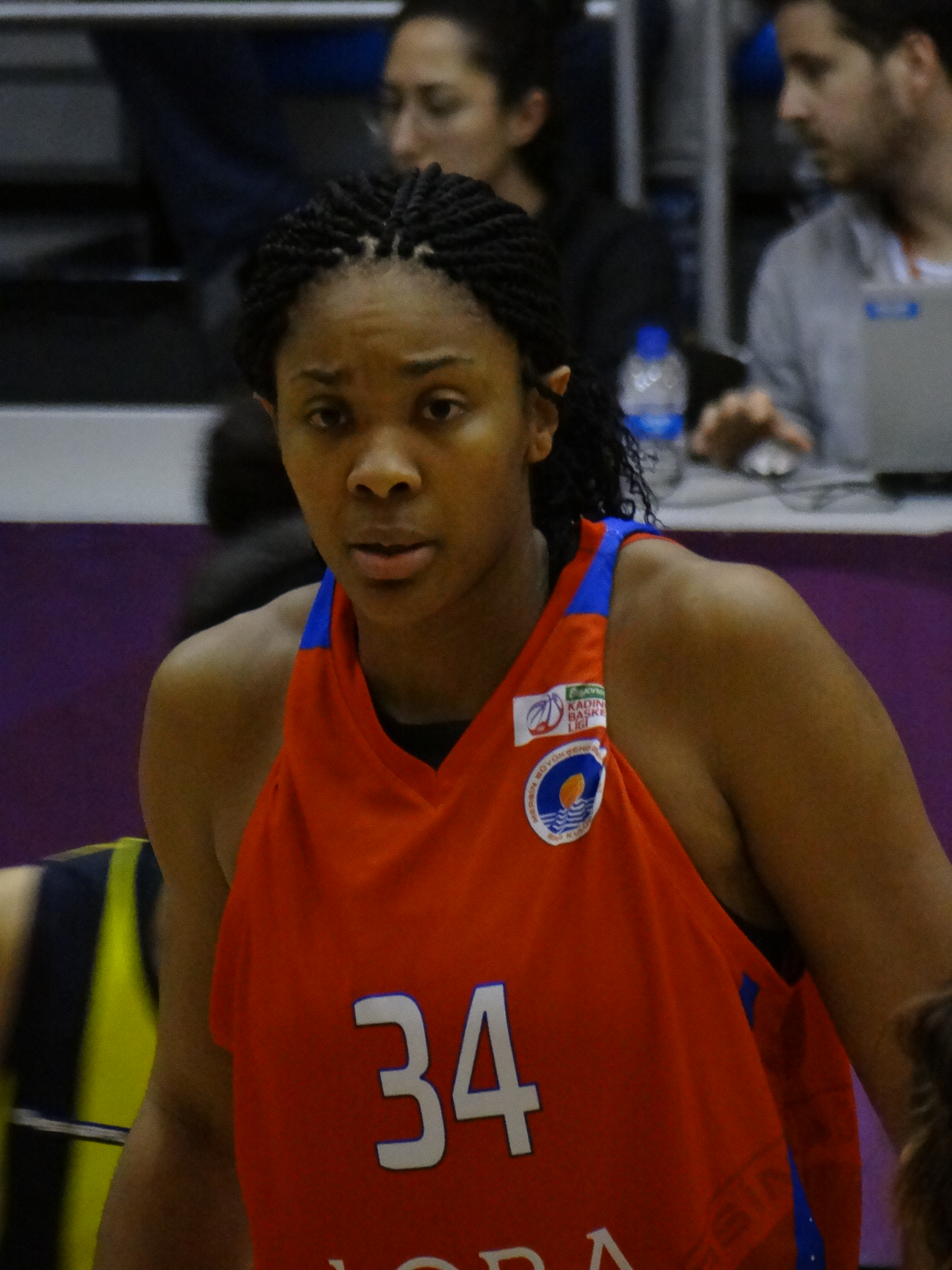
Thomas in 2018

In February 2017, Thomas signed with the Washington Mystics. During the 2017 season, Thomas would have the best season of her career. After the first four games of the season, Thomas was moved from the bench to starting center in the Mystics lineup. On August 4, 2017, Thomas scored 3 points and grabbed a career-high 20 rebounds in a 76–74 loss to the San Antonio Stars. On August 12, 2017, Thomas scored a career-high 20 points along with 14 rebounds in a 100–80 win over the Indiana Fever. By the end of the season, Thomas would average new career-highs in scoring, rebounding, steals, assists and blocks. Following the league's new playoff format from the previous season, the Mystics would finish as the 6th seed in the league with an 18–16 record. In the first round elimination game, the Mystics defeated the Dallas Wings 86–76. Thomas scored 5 points along with 17 rebounds in the win. In the second round elimination game, the Mystics defeated the number-3 seeded New York Liberty 82–68, advancing past the second round for the first time in franchise history. Thomas scored 11 points along with 6 rebounds in the win. In the semi-finals, the Mystics would be defeated by the Minnesota Lynx in a 3-game sweep.

In 2018, Thomas would have reduced role on the team. Her reduced role would help for the betterment of the team as the Mystics finished 22–12 with the number 3 seed, receiving a bye to the second round. In the second round elimination game, the Mystics defeated the Los Angeles Sparks 96–64 to advance to the semi-finals again. In the semi-finals, they would defeat the number 2 seeded Atlanta Dream in five games to advance to the WNBA Finals for the first time in franchise history. In the Finals, the Mystics would fall short as they were swept by the Seattle Storm.

=== Overseas ===
In the 2011-12 WNBA off-season, Thomas played in France for Union Lyon Basket Feminin. In the 2012-13 WNBA off-season, Thomas played in China for the Jiangsu Phonenix. In the 2013-14 WNBA off-season, Thomas played in Spain for Perfumerias Avenida and won a championship with the team. In 2017, Thomas signed with Mersin BBSK for the 2017-18 WNBA off-season.

== WNBA career statistics ==
Legend
GP	Games played	GS	Games started	MPG	Minutes per game	RPG	Rebounds per game
APG	Assists per game	SPG	Steals per game	BPG	Blocks per game	PPG	Points per game
TO	Turnovers per game	FG%	Field-goal percentage	3P%	3-point field-goal percentage	FT%	Free-throw percentage
**Bold**	Career best	°	League leader

=== WNBA regular season ===
Year	Team	GP	GS	MPG	FG%	3P%	FT%	RPG	APG	SPG	BPG	PPG
2011*	Seattle	7	0	3.1	1.000	.000	.000	0.6	0.1	0.3	0.3	0.3
2011*	Phoenix	8	0	12.3	.563	.000	.500	1.0	0.1	0.0	0.6	2.6
2011	Total	15	0	8.0	**.588**	.000	.500	0.8	0.1	0.1	0.5	1.5
2012	Phoenix	29	25	**26.6**	.484	.000	.500	8.0	0.9	0.1	0.9	6.4
2013	Phoenix	**34**	3	14.0	.516	.000	.419	4.1	0.2	0.2	0.5	2.3
2014	Indiana	21	3	8.4	.545	.000	.429	2.2	0.4	0.1	0.7	2.0
2016	Seattle	19	0	9.3	.579	.000	**.714**	2.3	0.1	0.2	0.6	1.4
2017	Washington	**34**	**30**	24.3	.544	.000	.603	**9.6**	**1.0**	**0.5**	**1.1**	**7.0**
2018	Washington	24	7	9.9	.429	.000	.636	2.5	0.2	0.1	0.0	1.8
Career		176	68	16.2	.516	.000	.532	4.9	0.5	0.3	0.6	3.6

=== WNBA postseason ===
Year	Team	GP	GS	MPG	FG%	3P%	FT%	RPG	APG	SPG	BPG	PPG
2011	Phoenix	4	0	5.0	.333	.000	**1.000**	2.0	0.3	**0.2**	0.0	1.0
2013	Phoenix	**5**	0	7.9	**.667**	.000	.500	2.2	0.0	0.0	0.2	1.0
2014	Indiana	2	0	5.8	.500	.000	.000	1.5	0.0	0.0	0.0	1.0
2017	Washington	**5**	**5**	**26.7**	.579	.000	.500	**8.2**	**1.2**	**0.2**	**1.4**	**5.6**
2018	Washington	3	0	2.4	.000	.000	.000	1.3	0.3	0.0	0.0	0.0
Career		19	5	11.1	.517	.000	.529	3.5	0.4	0.1	0.4	2.1

== Personal life ==
Thomas is the oldest of five siblings. She has a sister that plays professional volleyball overseas. While at Duke University, Thomas majored in psychology. Other than professional basketball, Thomas is also an assistant coach at Grand Canyon University in her spare time.
