= Chay Shegog =

American basketball player (born 1990)

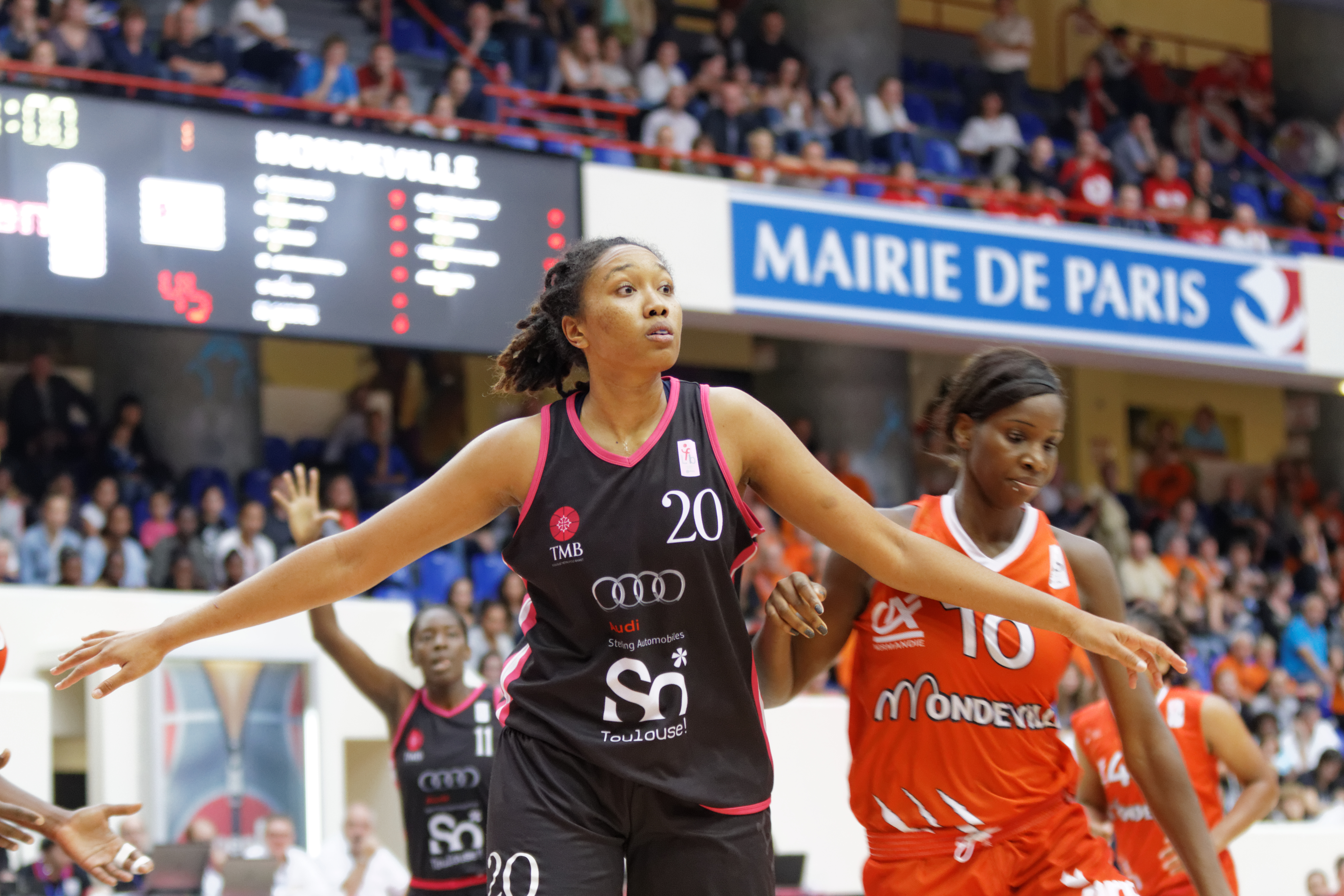

Free agent
- Position: Center

Personal information
- Born: February 22, 1990 (age 36) San Diego, California, U.S.
- Listed height: 6 ft 5 in (1.96 m)

Career information
- High school: Brooke Point (Stafford, Virginia)
- College: North Carolina (2008–2012)
- WNBA draft: 2012: 2nd round, 21st overall pick
- Drafted by: Connecticut Sun
- Playing career: 2012–present

Career history
- 2012: Connecticut Sun
- 2012: UNISEAT Győr

Career highlights
- ACC All-Freshman Team (2009); McDonald's All-American (2008)
- Stats at Basketball Reference
Medals
Women's Basketball
Representing United States
FIBA Under-19 World Cup
Gold medal – first place	2009 Thailand	Team

Chalysa Janee "Chay" Shegog (/ˈʃeɪ ʃɪˈɡɒɡ/ shay shi-gog; born February 22, 1990) is an American basketball player who played for the Connecticut Sun in the WNBA in the 2012 season. Shegog played for the North Carolina Tar Heels in college. In 2012, she was selected as the 21st overall draft pick for the WNBA by the Connecticut Sun. In August 2012, Shegog was waived by the Sun. She played for Hungarian team UNISEAT Gyor in the WNBA off-season. As of now, Shegog is working as a gym teacher at Alternative Paths Training School, in Fredericksburg.

== Early life and education ==
Shegog was born Chalysa Janee Shegog in San Diego, California on February 22, 1990. She is the daughter of Theresa (née Poblete) and Darnell Shegog. Shegog has two brothers, Richard and Anthony. Her family lived in Ewa Beach, Hawaii before moving to Virginia just before her freshman year of high school.

== High school career ==
Shegog was named a WBCA All-American in 2008. She participated in the 2008 WBCA High School All-America Game, where she scored fifteen points and eleven rebounds for the victorious Red Team. She was selected to play for the Girls East Team in the 2008 McDonald's All-American Game. Shegog tallied six points, seven rebounds and two steals as a starter for the East Team. Shegog also played AAU for the Fairfax Stars and won the 2003 13U national title. As of 2008, Shegog was Brooke Point's all-time leader in points (1,692), rebounds, blocks (570) and assists (214).

== College career ==
Shegog was recruited by colleges including Duke and LSU but committed to the Tar Heels early. Shegog played for the University of North Carolina at Chapel Hill and lettered in all four seasons. Shegog reached 1000 career points in December 2011. In early January 2012 Shegog was the leading scorer in the ACC conference with an average of 17.3 points per game.

== Professional career ==
=== WNBA ===
Shegog was selected as the 21st overall pick in the 2012 WNBA draft by the Connecticut Sun. In the 2012 season, Shegog saw little court time and finished with a total of 3 points. Shegog was the first Filipino to play in the WNBA.

=== Overseas ===
In 2012, Shegog played for Hungarian team UNI SEAT Gyor.

== USA Basketball ==
- Silver Medal at 2007 USA Youth Development Festival. Shegog averaged 7.6 points per game, 5.6 rebounds per game and 1.6 blocks per game to help the USA Blue Team to a 2–3 record and silver medal.
- Participated in the 2008 USA U18 National Team Trials.
- In 2009 Shegog was selected for the USA Women's U19 National Team.

== Career statistics ==
Legend
GP	Games played	GS	Games started	MPG	Minutes per game	RPG	Rebounds per game
APG	Assists per game	SPG	Steals per game	BPG	Blocks per game	PPG	Points per game
TO	Turnovers per game	FG%	Field-goal percentage	3P%	3-point field-goal percentage	FT%	Free-throw percentage
**Bold**	Career best	°	League leader

=== WNBA ===
WNBA regular season statistics
Year	Team	GP	GS	MPG	FG%	3P%	FT%	RPG	APG	SPG	BPG	TO	PPG
2012	Connecticut	3	0	3.0	33.3	—	50.0	0.7	0.0	0.3	0.0	0.3	1.0
**Career**	1 year, 1 team	3	0	3.0	33.3	—	50.0	0.7	0.0	0.3	0.0	0.3	1.0

=== College ===
NCAA statistics
Year	Team	GP	Points	FG%	3P%	FT%	RPG	APG	SPG	BPG	PPG
2008–09	North Carolina	35	251	49.8	–	62.0	4.4	0.7	0.8	1.2	7.2
2009–10	North Carolina	29	257	51.6	–	55.0	6.0	0.9	0.7	0.7	8.9
2010–11	North Carolina	**36**	321	51.3	–	**74.0**	4.9	0.8	0.7	1.1	8.9
2011–12	North Carolina	31	**484**	**52.9**	–	59.3	**6.9**	**1.6**	**1.3**	**2.3**	**15.6**
**Career**		131	1313	51.6	–	63.0	5.5	1.0	0.9	1.3	10.0

== Awards and honors ==
- Was named to Parade Magazine fourth All-America team in 2007 and third All-American team in 2008
- Was named the Fredericksburg Freelance Star Player of the Year in all four of her high school varsity seasons.
- Was named to the 2008 Slam Magazine All-America third team.
- Was named to the 2007 and 2008 Washington Post All-Met first team and honorable mention in 2005 and 2006.
- Was named the 2007 and 2008 Commonwealth District Player of the Year, and was selected to the All-Commonwealth District and All-Northwest Region first teams in 2005–2008.
- Was named to the 2009 Atlantic Coast Conference All-Freshman Team.
- Earned ACC Rookie of the Week honors in 2008 and 2011.
- Was named to the All-ACC Conference's second-team in 2012.
