= Miljana Bojović =

Serbian basketball player

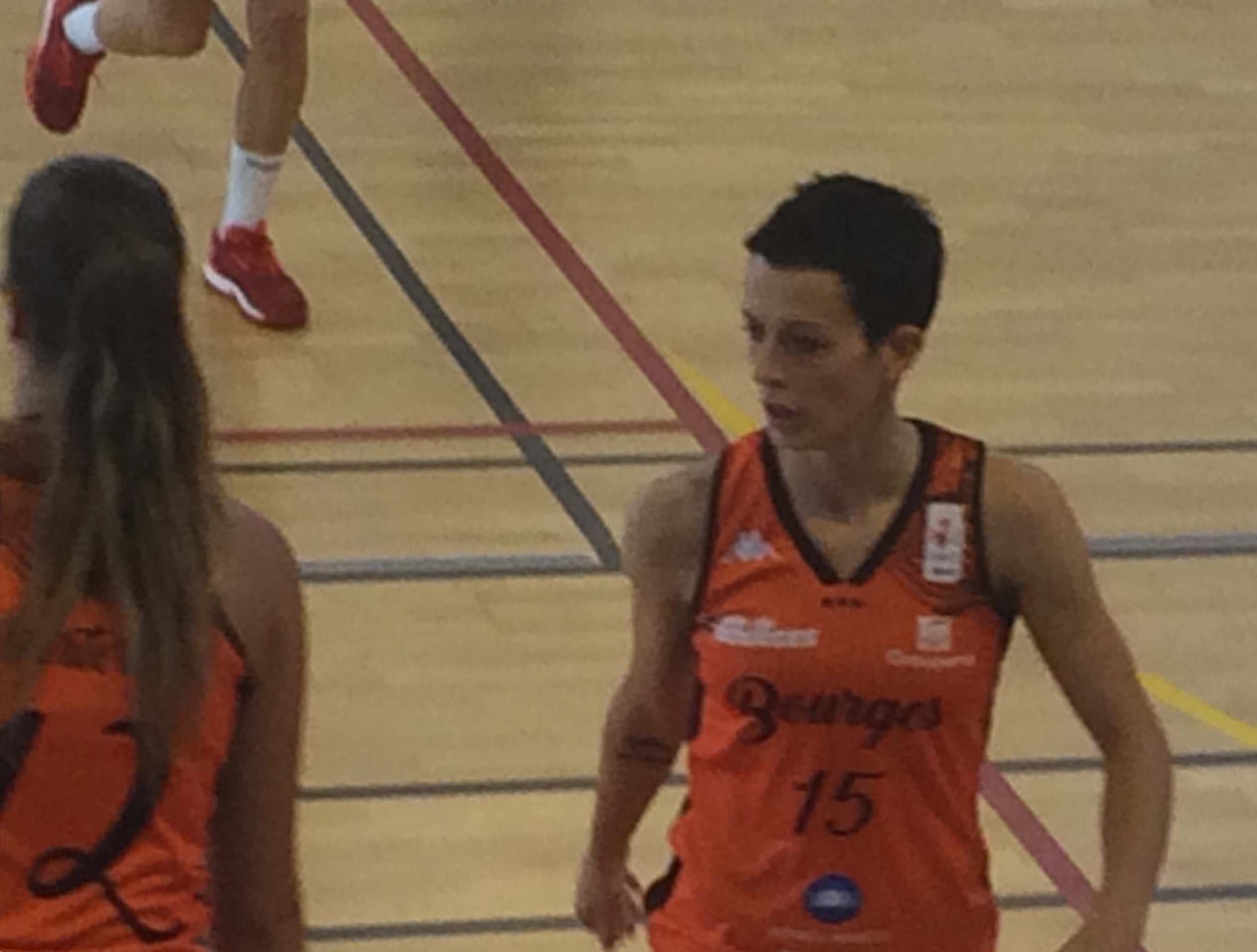
- Tango Bourges' Serbian player on September 3, 2016 during a friendly encounter facing Angers at Pavillons-subBois

Polkowice
- Position: Point guard
- League: EuroLeague Women; Basket Liga Kobiet

Personal information
- Born: May 17, 1987 (age 39) Titova Mitrovica, SFR Yugoslavia
- Listed height: 1.81 m (5 ft 11 in)
- Listed weight: 67 kg (148 lb)

Career information
- WNBA draft: 2009: undrafted
- Playing career: 2004–present

Career history
- 2004–2005: Kovin
- 2005–2006: Kimiko Struga
- 2006–2007: Barcelona
- 2007–2008: Olesa
- 2008–2009: Rivas Ecópolis
- 2009: Crvena zvezda
- 2009–2010: Good Angels Košice
- 2010: Lotos Gdynia
- 2010–2014: Good Angels Košice
- 2014–2015: Fenerbahçe
- 2015–2016: Polkowice
- 2016–2017: Bourges Basket
- 2017: Partizan
- 2018–: Polkowice
Medals
Women's basketball
Representing Serbia
World U19 Championship
Silver medal – second place	2005 Tunisia	Team
European U20 Championship
Silver medal – second place	2007 Bulgaria	Team
European U18 Championship
Gold medal – first place	2005 Hungary	Team
European U16 Championship
Gold medal – first place	2003 Turkey	Team

Miljana Bojović (Serbian Cyrillic: Миљана Бојовић, born in Titova Mitrovica, SFR Yugoslavia on 17 May 1987), formerly known as Miljana Musović, is a Serbian women basketball player, currently playing for Polkowice. She has played the Eurobasket with the Serbian national team and the Euroleague with Lotos Gdynia and Good Angels Košice. She is 1.81 meters tall and plays as a point guard.

She won 4 Slovak Championships with Good Angels Kosice. She was the first foreign captain of the team and is one of the Kosice fans favourite players.

At the age 18, she was the MVP and winner of the U18 European Championship in Budapest with 17.6 points and 4.5 assists per game leaving behind names like Dominguez and Gruda. Playing for the U20 national team, she won the silver medal in the European championship averaging 16 points and 4.1 assists per game.

In recent years, she became one of the best point guards in Europe averaging over 5 assists per game in Euroleague women last 3 years. Miljana Bojovic is married to singer of Serbian ska band Samostalni Referenti. She is a big fan of Chelsea football club and her favorite player is John Terry. In 2016, she signed a contract with CJM Bourges Basket from France to replace Celine Dumerc.

== Career ==
- (Serbia) Kovin (2004–05)
- (North Macedonia) Kimiko Struga (2005–06)
- (Spain) Universitat-FC Barcelona (2006–07)
- (Spain) Olesa (2007–08)
- (Spain) Rivas Ecópolis (2008–09)
- (Serbia) Crvena zvezda (2009)
- Good Angels Košice (2009–10)
  - Slovakia League: 2010
- (Poland) Lotos Gdynia (2010)
- Good Angels Košice (2010–14)
  - Slovakia League: 2011, 2012, 2013, 2014
  - Slovakia Cup: 2013
- (Turkey) Fenerbahçe (2014–15)
  - Turkish Super Cup: 2014
  - Turkish Cup: 2015
- (Poland) Polkowice (2015–16)
- (France) Bourges Basket (2016–17)
  - Franch Cup: 2017
- (Serbia) Partizan (2017–present)
