= Jasmine James =

American basketball player (born 1991)

Tulsa Golden Hurricane
- Position: Assistant coach
- League: American Conference

Personal information
- Born: July 29, 1991 (age 35) Memphis, Tennessee, U.S.
- Listed height: 5 ft 9 in (1.75 m)

Career information
- High school: Bartlett (Bartlett, Tennessee)
- College: Georgia (2009–2013)
- WNBA draft: 2013: 3rd round, 30th overall pick
- Drafted by: Seattle Storm
- Coaching career: 2017–present

Career history

Playing
- 2013: Phoenix Mercury

Coaching
- 2017: Bartlett High School (assistant)
- 2018: Bartlett High School
- 2020–2022: Tennessee Tech (assistant)
- 2022–2025: Missouri (assistant)
- 2025–present: Tulsa (assistant)

Career highlights
- 2× Second-team All-SEC (2011, 2013)
- Stats at WNBA.com
- Stats at Basketball Reference

Jasmine James (born July 29, 1991) is an American basketball coach and former player. She is an assistant coach for the Tulsa Golden Hurricane. James played college basketball as a guard for the Georgia Lady Bulldogs and professionally for the Phoenix Mercury of the Women's National Basketball Association (WNBA). She was selected by the Seattle Storm in the third round of the 2013 WNBA draft.

== Early life ==
James was born July 29, 1991 in Memphis, Tennessee. She attended Bartlett High School in Bartlett. She scored 2,378 career points while playing for the school's basketball team; The Commercial Appeal named her the Memphis area's player of the year three times.

== College career ==
James played college basketball for the Georgia Lady Bulldogs. Known by the nickname "J. J." to teammates and coaches, she played 35.9 minutes per game, which led the team, as a freshman; she played a total of 1,222 minutes that season, which was the highest of any player in the Southeastern Conference (SEC). She contributed 17 points in a win against the Florida Gators to help Georgia improve to 16–0, establishing 2009–10 as the best start to a season in school history. She averaged 11.5 points, 5.1 rebounds, 3.0 assists, and 1.8 steals per game in 34 games, with 33 starts, and was named to the SEC's all-freshman team.

In her sophomore season, Georgia head coach Andy Landers said James "has a very high basketball I.Q." That season, in the second round of the 2011 NCAA Division I women's basketball tournament, James made the game-winning score on a putback three-point play with 2.9 seconds left in the game to defeat the Florida State Seminoles. She averaged 12.3 points, 3.5 rebounds, 3.6 assists, and 1.8 steals while starting in all 33 games and earning second-team All-SEC honors.

Against the South Carolina State Lady Bulldogs in James's junior year, she led Georgia with 17 points in an 85–46 victory. She played in 24 games that year, with 22 starts; she averaged 10.6 points, 4.7 rebounds, 3.4 assists, and 2.7 steals per game.

In a standout performance in her senior year, James scored 17 points with five assists and six steals, leading Georgia to a win against the New Mexico Lobos. She averaged 11.0 points, 3.6 rebounds, 3.8 assists, and 2.3 steals per game while starting in all 35 games and earning second-team All-SEC honors for a second time.

== Professional career ==
James was selected by the Seattle Storm in the third round (30th overall) of the 2013 WNBA draft. She played for the Storm through the 2013 preseason before being waived; she was then signed by the Phoenix Mercury. James played in 16 games for the Mercury in 2013, averaging 3.1 points, 1.4 rebounds, and 1.8 assists per game. She went on to play for professional teams in Brazil, Luxembourg, Germany, and Israel.

== Coaching career ==
After retiring from professional basketball, James began a career in basketball coaching. She was named an assistant coach at her alma mater, Bartlett High School, in 2017, and was named the head coach in 2018. James became the director of basketball operations for the SIUE Cougars in 2019. In 2020 she accepted an assistant coaching position with the Tennessee Tech Golden Eagles. James continued on to the Missouri Tigers in 2022, holding the position of assistant coach through the 2024–25 season. She joined the staff of the Tulsa Golden Hurricane as an assistant coach in April 2025.
