= Middle European League =

Women's basketball league in Hungary, Slovakia and Croatia

- Sport: Basketball
- Founded: 2012
- First season: 2012–13
- Folded: 2014
- No. of teams: 8 (2012–13); 11 (2013–14)
- Country: Hungary; Slovakia; Croatia
- Continent: FIBA Europe (Europe)
- Last champions: (Slovakia) Good Angels Košice (2nd title)
- Most titles: (Slovakia) Good Angels Košice (2 titles)

The Middle European League, shortly MEL (in Hungarian: Közép-Európai Liga) was a top-level regional women's basketball league, featuring teams from Hungary, Slovakia and Croatia. The competition was founded in 2012 and folded after two seasons in 2014.

== History ==
Originally created as a joint Hungarian-Slovak competition, the inaugural season had 8 teams competing (4 from Hungary and 4 from Slovakia). It ran simultaneously with the Hungarian and Slovak domestic leagues, and the results between teams from the same country counted for both MEL and domestic leagues.

In the second and last season, 11 teams participated (5 from Hungary, 5 from Slovakia and 1 from Croatia).

== Finals ==
Season	Host	Final			Bronze final		
Season	Host	Winner	Score	Runner-up	Third place	Score	Fourth place
2012–13	(Slovakia) Košice	(Slovakia); Good Angels Košice	62–58	(Hungary); UNIQA Euroleasing Sopron	(Slovakia); MBK Ružomberok	79–41	(Hungary); UNI Győr
2013–14	(Slovakia) Košice	(Slovakia); Good Angels Košice	70–63	(Hungary); UNIQA Euroleasing Sopron	(Hungary); PEAC-Pécs	64–58	(Croatia); Novi Zagreb

== Champions ==
Team	Winners	Runners-up	Years Won	Years Runner-up
(Slovakia) Good Angels Košice	2	–	2013, 2014	–
(Hungary) UNIQA Euroleasing Sopron	–	2	–	2013, 2014

== MVP by edition ==
- 2012–13 -
- 2013–14 - (United States) Jia Perkins
