= Good Angels Košice =

Young Angels Košice
- Leagues: Slovak Extraliga, EuroLeague Women
- Founded: 2001
- Arena: Infiniti Aréna (2500 seats)
- Location: Košice, Slovakia
- Team colors: blue, yellow
- President: Róbert Jano
- Head coach: Zuzana Žirková
- Championships: 2 Middle European League: 2013, 2014; 2 EWBL: 2017, 2018; 15 Slovak Women's Basketball Extraliga: 2004, 2005, 2006, 2007, 2008, 2009, 2010, 2011, 2012, 2013, 2014, 2015, 2016, 2017, 2018; 9 Slovak Cup Winner: 2010, 2011, 2012, 2013, 2014, 2015, 2016, 2018, 2021
- Website: www.goodangelskosice.eu

Good Angels Košice, since 2018 playing as Young Angels Košice is a women's basketball team based in Košice, Slovakia that plays in Slovakia's domestic league and FIBA Europe’s EuroLeague Women. The team bears the name of a non-profit charitable organization Dobrý anjel (translated as Good Angel).

The team has gone by several names since its founding in 2001, including Delta VODS Košice (2002-2003), Delta ICP Košice (2003-2006), K Cero VODS Košice (2006-2007), Kosit 2013 Košice (2007-2008), Maxima Broker Košice (2008-2009), Dobri Anjeli Košice (2009-2011). Since 2011, the club has gone by the name Good Angels Košice and since 2018 play under the name Young Angels Košice.

== Championships ==
- Middle European League (2): 2013, 2014
- EWBL (2): 2017, 2018
- Slovak Women's Basketball Extraliga (15): 2004, 2005, 2006, 2007, 2008, 2009, 2010, 2011, 2012, 2013, 2014, 2015, 2016, 2017, 2018
- Slovak Cup Winner (9): 2010, 2011, 2012, 2013, 2014, 2015, 2016, 2018, 2021

== Current roster ==
Good Angels Košice roster
Players
Coaches

Pos.	No.	Nat.	Name	Ht.	Age
PG	2	(Slovakia)	Majorošová, Nina	1.69 m (5 ft 7 in)	22 – 4 May 2004
PF	3	(Slovakia)	Kristlová, Vanda Mária	1.86 m (6 ft 1 in)	23 – 3 March 2003
PG	4	(Slovakia)	Szmereková, Ema	1.67 m (5 ft 6 in)	20 – 16 November 2005
C	5	(Slovakia)	Mikovčáková, Diana (C)	1.86 m (6 ft 1 in)	26 – 16 August 2000
SG	8	(Slovakia)	Bohušová, Barbora	1.8 m (5 ft 11 in)	25 – 20 July 2001
SF	10	(Slovakia)	Balážová, Michaela	1.82 m (6 ft 0 in)	27 – 30 March 1999
PG	14	(Slovakia)	Rodáková, Ema	1.73 m (5 ft 8 in)	24 – 21 September 2001
PF	16	(Slovakia)	Plavnická, Kamila	1.85 m (6 ft 1 in)	25 – 16 May 2001
SF	17	(Slovakia)	Ošťádalová, Radka	1.82 m (6 ft 0 in)	27 – 3 May 1999
SF	19	(Slovakia)	Šedivá, Katarína	1.85 m (6 ft 1 in)	18 – 13 November 2007
SG	21	(Slovakia)	Knapová, Katarína	1.75 m (5 ft 9 in)	26 – 10 January 2000
PF	22	(Slovakia)	Jakubčeková, Hana	1.86 m (6 ft 1 in)	22 – 5 March 2004
SF	24	(Slovakia)	Rebejová, Tara	1.76 m (5 ft 9 in)	22 – 5 March 2004
SF	25	(Slovakia)	Filická, Natália	1.74 m (5 ft 9 in)	23 – 24 May 2003
SG	28	(Slovakia)	Dulovičová, Emma	1.69 m (5 ft 7 in)	22 – 23 December 2003
SG	31	(United States)	Blanks, Deijah	1.78 m (5 ft 10 in)	30 – 3 July 1996

Head coach

- (Slovakia) Maroš Kováčik

Assistant coach(es)

- (Slovakia) Peter Jankovič

Legend

- (C) Team captain
- Injured

- Roster

=== Notable players ===
- (Slovakia) Iveta Bieliková (2005–2005)
- (Slovakia) Katarína Hricková (2008–2012)
- (Slovakia) Luisa Michulková (−2008, 2009–2010)
- (Slovakia) Alena Kováčová (−2010)
- (Slovakia) Zuzana Žirková (2010–2018)
- (Slovakia) Ivana Jalčová (−2011)
- (Slovakia) Daniela Číkošová (−2011)
- (Slovakia) Jana Čarnoká (−2012)
- (Slovakia) (United States) Erin Lawless (2009–2012)
- (Slovakia) Lucia Kupčíková (2009−2017)
- (Slovakia) Janka Minčíková (2007-2009,2014-2015)
- (Slovakia) Barbora Wrzesiński (2012–2018)
- (United States) Kelly Mazzante (2006–2007)
- (United States) Janel McCarville (2006–2008)
- (United States) Cathrine Kraayeveld (2008–2009)
- (United States) Angel McCoughtry (2009–2010)
- (United States) Candice Dupree (2010–2011)
- (United States) Charde Houston (2010–2011)
- (United States) Ashley Shields (2011–2011)
- (United States) Crystal Langhorne (2011–2011,2014-2014)
- (United States) Kayla Pedersen (2011–2012)
- (United States) Danielle McCray (2011–2012)
- (United States) Riquna Williams (2012–2012)
- (United States) A'dia Mathies (2013–2013)
- (United States) Plenette Pierson (2012–2014)
- (United States) Jia Perkins (2014–2014)
- (United States) Lynetta Kizer (2014–2014)
- (United States) Sugar Rodgers (2015–2015)
- (Serbia) Miljana Bojović (2010-2014)
- (Lithuania) Marina Solopova (2011–2011)
- (Russia) Natalia Vieru (2011–2012)
- (Iceland) Helena Sverrisdóttir (2011–2013, 2018)
- (Czech Republic) Petra Kulichová (2012–2013)
- (Spain) (United States) Natasha Lacy (2012–2013)
- (Hungary) (United States) Alexandria Quigley (2012–2013)
- (Belarus) Yelena Leuchanka (2013–2014)
- (Sweden) Farhiya Abdi (2013–2014)
- (Australia) Erin Phillips (2014–2015)
- (Slovenia) Teja Oblak (2014–2017)
- (Hungary) Tijana Krivacevic (2012–2015)
