= 2026 EuroLeague Women Final Six =

Basketball tournament in Zaragoza

- Season: 2025–26 EuroLeague Women

Tournament details
- Arena: Pabellón Príncipe Felipe; Zaragoza, Spain
- Dates: 15–19 April 2026

Final positions
- Champions: (Turkish Basketball Federation) Fenerbahçe Opet (3rd title)
- Runners-up: (Turkish Basketball Federation) Galatasaray Çağdaş Faktoring
- Third place: (Spanish Basketball Federation) Casademont Zaragoza
- Fourth place: (Spanish Basketball Federation) Spar Girona

Awards and statistics
- MVP: (Belgium) Julie Allemand

The 2026 EuroLeague Women Final Six was the concluding round of the tournament of the 2025–26 EuroLeague Women season, the 68th season of Europe's premier club basketball tournament, and the 29th edition since being rebranded as the EuroLeague Women. On 2 December 2024, it was announced by FIBA Europe that the Final Six would be played at the Pabellón Príncipe Felipe in Zaragoza, Spain, on 15–19 April 2026.

Fenerbahçe won their third title after triumphing over their Turkish rivalry Galatasaray in the final.

== Venue ==
On 2 December 2024, it was announced by FIBA Europe that the Final Six would be played at the Pabellón Príncipe Felipe in Zaragoza, Spain. As part of the deal, Zaragoza will be hosting the Final Six for the next three seasons, starting from 2025.

2026 EuroLeague Women Final Six is located in Spain	Zaragoza
2026 EuroLeague Women Final Six is located in Spain	Pabellón Príncipe Felipe
2026 EuroLeague Women Final Six is located in Spain	Capacity: 10,744

== Teams ==
Team	Qualified date	Participations (Note: Including Final Four, Final Six and Final Eight tournaments.) (bold indicates winners)
(Turkey) Fenerbahçe Opet	22 January 2026	11 (2011–12, 2012–13, 2013–14, 2014–15, 2015–16, 2016–17, 2020–21, 2021–22, **2022–23**, **2023–24**, 2024–25)
(France) Basket Landes	28 January 2026	None
(Spain) Spar Girona	28 January 2026	None
(Turkey) Galatasaray Çağdaş Faktoring	29 January 2026	4 (1998–99, 2011–12, 2012–13, **2013–14**)
(Spain) Casademont Zaragoza	25 February 2026	None
(Italy) Umana Reyer Venezia	3 March 2026	None

== Bracket ==
Quarterfinals
15 April
(France) Basket Landes	53
**(Spanish Basketball Federation) Casademont Zaragoza**	**69**
15 April
**(Spain) Spar Girona**	**70**
(Italy) Umana Reyer Venezia	64

Semifinals
17 April
**(Turkey) Galatasaray Çağdaş Faktoring**	**63**
(Spanish Basketball Federation) Casademont Zaragoza	56
17 April
**(Turkey) Fenerbahçe Opet**	**76**
(Spain) Spar Girona	59

Final
19 April
(Turkey) Galatasaray Çağdaş Faktoring	55
**(Turkey) Fenerbahçe Opet**	**68**
Third place
19 April
**(Spanish Basketball Federation) Casademont Zaragoza**	**66**
(Spain) Spar Girona	63

== Quarterfinals ==
15 April 2026	**Spar Girona** (Spanish Basketball Federation)	**70**–64	(Italian Basketball Federation) Umana Reyer Venezia	Zaragoza
17:30 (CEST)	Scoring by quarter: 19–19, **20**–9, 17–**19**, 14–**17**
	Pts: Coulibaly 19; Rebs: Coulibaly 15; Asts: Jocytė 6 PIR: Coulibaly 25	Boxscore	Pts: Dojkić 19; Rebs: Cubaj, Mavunga 7 Asts: Dojkić 5 PIR: Cubaj, Dojkić 19	Arena: Pabellón Príncipe Felipe; Attendance: 5,024; Referees: Josip Jurčević (CRO), Veronika Obertová (SVK), Juozas Barkauskas (LTU)

15 April 2026	Basket Landes (French Federation of Basketball)	53–**69**	(Spanish Basketball Federation) **Casademont Zaragoza**	Zaragoza
20:30 (CEST)	Scoring by quarter: 18–**19**, 8–**16**, 14–**27**, **13**–7
	Pts: Musa 19; Rebs: Musa 10; Asts: Pardon 6 PIR: Musa 22	Boxscore	Pts: Gueye 17; Rebs: Fingall 9 Asts: Ortiz 6 PIR: Bankolé 20	Arena: Pabellón Príncipe Felipe; Attendance: 10,828; Referees: Sónia Teixeira (POR), Petar Pešić (SRB), Ioannis Agrafiotis (GRE)

== Semifinals ==
17 April 2026	**Fenerbahçe Opet** (Turkish Basketball Federation)	**76**–59	(Spanish Basketball Federation) Spar Girona	Zaragoza
17:30 (CEST)	Scoring by quarter: 12–**17**, **25**–10, **17**–13, **22**–19
	Pts: Meesseman 14; Rebs: Meesseman 6 Asts: Meesseman 6 PIR: Meesseman 23	Boxscore	Pts: Bibby, Holm 16; Rebs: Holm 10; Asts: Holm 5 PIR: Holm 19	Arena: Pabellón Príncipe Felipe; Attendance: 6,707; Referees: Josip Jurčević (CRO), Ewa Matuszweska (POL), Ioannis Agrafiotis (GRE)

17 April 2026	**Galatasaray Çağdaş Faktoring** (Turkish Basketball Federation)	**63**–56	(Spanish Basketball Federation) Casademont Zaragoza	Zaragoza
20:30 (CEST)	Scoring by quarter: **24**–4, 13–**16**, 12–**14**, 14–**22**
	Pts: Johannès 16; Rebs: Kuier 11; Asts: Erdoğan 5 PIR: Williams 20	Boxscore	Pts: Hempe 18; Rebs: Hempe 8 Asts: three players 4 PIR: Hempe 17	Arena: Pabellón Príncipe Felipe; Attendance: 10,828; Referees: Petar Pešić (SRB), Nataša Dragojević (MNE), Juozas Barkauskas (LTU)

== Third place game ==
19 April 2026	**Casademont Zaragoza** (Spanish Basketball Federation)	**66**–63	(Spanish Basketball Federation) Spar Girona	Zaragoza
17:00 (CEST)	Scoring by quarter: **17**–15, 17–**21**, **23**–12, 9–**15**
	Pts: Leite 20; Rebs: Fingall 8 Asts: Leite 6 PIR: Leite 20	Boxscore	Pts: Bibby 17; Rebs: Holm 13; Asts: three players 4 PIR: Holm 23	Arena: Pabellón Príncipe Felipe; Attendance: 10,828; Referees: Josip Jurčević (CRO), Nataša Dragojević (MNE), Ioannis Agrafiotis (GRE)

== Final ==
19 April 2026	Galatasaray Çağdaş Faktoring (Turkish Basketball Federation)	55–**68**	(Turkish Basketball Federation) **Fenerbahçe Opet**	Zaragoza
20:00 (CEST)	Scoring by quarter: 16–**17**, 16–**20**, 13–**14**, 10–**17**
	Pts: Williams 15; Rebs: Smalls 9 Asts: Kuier 7 PIR: Williams 20	Boxscore	Pts: Meesseman 20; Rebs: Williams, Allemand 8 Asts: Allemand 10; PIR: Allemand 28	Arena: Pabellón Príncipe Felipe; Attendance: 8,737; Referees: Sónia Teixeira (POR), Petar Pešić (SRB), Juozas Barkauskas (LTU)

Starters:			Pts	Reb	Ast
PG	11	(Turkey) Derin Erdoğan	5	2	1
G	23	(France) Marine Johannès	12	6	5
SF	0	(Bosnia and Herzegovina) Kamiah Smalls	8	9	0
PF	34	(Finland) Awak Kuier	10	7	7
C	1	(United States) Elizabeth Williams	15	8	2
Reserves:					
SF	5	(Turkey) Sude Yılmaz	DNP		
PG	6	(Turkey) Gökşen Fitik	3	2	0
SF	7	(Turkey) Sehernaz Çidal	DNP		
PF	12	(Turkey) Zeynep Şevval Gül	DNP		
PF	17	(Turkey) Elif Bayram	2	4	3
PG	21	(Turkey) Berna Şahin	DNP		
Head coach:
(Turkish Basketball Federation) Fırat Okul

**Galatasaray**	**Fenerbahçe**

Galatasaray	Statistics	Fenerbahçe
14/31 (45.2%)	2-pt field goals	16/38 (42.1%)
7/28 (25%)	3-pt field goals	8/25 (32%)
6/7 (85.7%)	Free throws	12/17 (70.6%)
12	Offensive rebounds	8
32	Defensive rebounds	26
44	Total rebounds	34
18	Assists	21
19	Turnovers	9
6	Steals	11
3	Blocks	4
19	Fouls	12

2025–26 EuroLeague Women Champions

**Fenerbahçe**
(3rd title)

Starters:			Pts	Reb	Ast
PG	22	(Belgium) Julie Allemand	13	8	10
PG	2	(Turkey) Sevgi Uzun	2	2	1
SF	5	(France) Gabby Williams	4	8	3
PF	30	(United States) Breanna Stewart	9	2	0
C	11	(Belgium) Emma Meesseman	20	5	4
Reserves:					
PG	3	(Turkey) Ayşe Yılmaz	DNP		
SG	4	(Turkey) Olcay Çakır	4	1	2
PG	10	(Turkey) Alperi Onar	DNP		
C	12	(France) Iliana Rupert	16	6	1
SF	13	(Turkey) Tuana Vural	DNP		
PF	15	(Turkey) Tilbe Şenyürek	DNP		
C	31	(Serbia) Nikolina Milić	DNP		
Head coach:
(Spanish Basketball Federation) Miguel Méndez

== Awards ==
=== EuroLeague Final Six MVP ===
Player	Team	Ref.
(Belgium) Julie Allemand	(Turkey) Fenerbahçe Opet	

=== EuroLeague Final Six MVP All Star Team ===
PG	SG	SF	PF	C	Ref.
(Belgium) Julie Allemand ( (Turkey) Fenerbahçe Opet)	(North Macedonia) Merritt Hempe ( (Spain) Casademont Zaragoza)	(Sweden) Klara Holm ( (Spain) Spar Girona)	(Belgium) Emma Meesseman ( (Turkey) Fenerbahçe Opet)	(United States) Elizabeth Williams ( (Turkey) Galatasaray Çağdaş Faktoring)	

=== EuroLeague Final Six MVP of the Round ===
Round	PG	SG	SF	PF	C	Ref.
Quarterfinals	(Mali) Mariam Coulibaly ( (Spain) Spar Girona)	(Lithuania) Justė Jocytė ( (Spain) Spar Girona)	(Nigeria) Murjanatu Musa ( (France) Basket Landes)	(France) Ornella Bankolé ( (Spain) Casademont Zaragoza)	(Croatia) Ivana Dojkić ( (Italy) Umana Reyer Venezia)	
Semifinals	(Sweden) Klara Holm ( (Spain) Spar Girona)	(France) Gabby Williams ( (Turkey) Fenerbahçe Opet)	(North Macedonia) Merritt Hempe ( (Spain) Casademont Zaragoza)	(United States) Elizabeth Williams ( (Turkey) Galatasaray Çağdaş Faktoring)	(Belgium) Emma Meesseman ( (Turkey) Fenerbahçe Opet)	
