= 2025 EuroLeague Women Final Six =

Basketball tournament in Zaragoza

- Season: 2024–25 EuroLeague Women

Tournament details
- Arena: Pabellón Príncipe Felipe; Zaragoza, Spain
- Dates: 9–13 April 2025

Final positions
- Champions: (Czech Republic) ZVVZ USK Praha (2nd title)
- Runners-up: (Turkey) CBK Mersin
- Third place: (Turkey) Fenerbahçe Opet
- Fourth place: (Spain) Valencia Basket

Awards and statistics
- MVP: (United States) Brionna Jones
- Top scorer(s): (United States) Brionna Jones (57 points)

The 2025 EuroLeague Women Final Six was the concluding round of the tournament of the 2024–25 EuroLeague Women season, the 67th season of Europe's premier club basketball tournament, and the 28th edition since being rebranded as the EuroLeague Women. It is the first time ever that this final six format has been adopted. On 2 December 2024, it was announced by FIBA Europe that the Final Six would be played at the Pabellón Príncipe Felipe in Zaragoza, Spain, on 9–13 April 2025.

Numerous sponsors have been brought in for this season-ending event, including Azulmarino, DAZN, Silbö, Iberia and Endesa.

ZVVZ USK Praha won their second title after triumphing over CBK Mersin in the final. With legendary coach, Natália Hejková, winning the title before her retirement.

== Venue ==
On 2 December 2024, it was announced by FIBA Europe that the Final Six would be played at the Pabellón Príncipe Felipe in Zaragoza, Spain, on 9–13 April 2025. As part of the deal, Zaragoza will be hosting the Final Six for the next three seasons.

2025 EuroLeague Women Final Six is located in Spain	Zaragoza
2025 EuroLeague Women Final Six is located in Spain	Pabellón Príncipe Felipe
2025 EuroLeague Women Final Six is located in Spain	Capacity: 10,744

== Teams ==
Team	Qualified date	Participations (Note: Including Final Four and Final Eights tournaments.) (bold indicates winners)
(Turkey) Fenerbahçe Opet	8 January 2025	10 (2011–12, 2012–13, 2013–14, 2014–15, 2015–16, 2016–17, 2020–21, 2021–22, **2022–23**, **2023–24**)
(Turkey) CBK Mersin	8 January 2025	2 (2022–23, 2023–24)
(Spain) Valencia Basket	22 January 2025	None
(Italy) Beretta Familia Schio	28 January 2025	3 (2011–12, 2012–13, 2022–23)
(France) Tango Bourges Basket	26 February 2025	9 (1995–96, **1996–97**, **1997–98**, 1999–00, **2000–01**, 2002–03, 2006–07, 2007–08, 2012–13)
(Czech Republic) ZVVZ USK Praha	26 February 2025	8 (2013–14, **2014–15**, 2015–16, 2016–17, 2018–19, 2021–22, 2022–23, 2023–24)

== Referees ==
These referees were chosen for the Final Six.

Referees
Bulgaria	Ventsislav Velikov
Estonia	Mihkel Männiste
Hungary	Péter Praksch
Lithuania	Gintaras Mačiulis
Poland	Paulina Karolina Gajdosz
Serbia	Ivana Ivanović
Slovakia	Veronika Obertová
Spain	Ariadna Chueca

== Bracket ==
Quarterfinals
9 April
**(Turkey) CBK Mersin**	**66**
(France) Tango Bourges Basket	59
9 April
(Italy) Beretta Familia Schio	72
**(Czech Republic) ZVVZ USK Praha**	**79**

Semifinals
11 April
(Spain) Valencia Basket	66
**(Turkey) CBK Mersin**	**68**
11 April
(Turkey) Fenerbahçe Opet	71
**(Czech Republic) ZVVZ USK Praha**	**91**

Final
13 April
(Turkey) CBK Mersin	53
**(Czech Republic) ZVVZ USK Praha**	**66**
Third place
13 April
(Spain) Valencia Basket	49
**(Turkey) Fenerbahçe Opet**	**59**

=== Quarterfinals ===
9 April 2025
17:30

Boxscore

Beretta Familia Schio (Italy)	72–**79**	(Czech Republic) **ZVVZ USK Praha**
Scoring by quarter: 18–**19**, 17–**28**, **19**–14, 18–18
Pts: Salaün, Keys 13; Rebs: Salaün, Keys 6 Asts: Verona 12		Pts: Ayayi 19; Rebs: Magbegor 13; Asts: Oblak 6

Pabellón Príncipe Felipe, Zaragoza
Attendance: 2,180
Referees: Ariadna Chueca (ESP), Péter Praksch (HUN), Mihkel Männiste (EST)

9 April 2025
20:30

Boxscore

**CBK Mersin** (Turkey)	**66**–59	(France) Tango Bourges Basket
Scoring by quarter: 16–**21**, **16**–10, 18–18, **16**–10
Pts: Howard 15; Rebs: Howard 10; Asts: Rupert 6		Pts: Okonkwo 14; Rebs: Astier 8 Asts: Astier 6

Pabellón Príncipe Felipe, Zaragoza
Attendance: 2,430
Referees: Paulina Karolina Gajdosz (POL), Ventsislav Velikov (BUL), Gintaras Mačiulis (LTU)

=== Semifinals ===
11 April 2025
17:30

Boxscore

Fenerbahçe Opet (Turkey)	71–**91**	(Czech Republic) ZVVZ USK Praha
Scoring by quarter: 25–**27**, 12–**19**, 13–**22**, 21–**23**
Pts: Williams 20; Rebs: Meesseman, Sabally 4 Asts: Allemand 7		Pts: Magbegor, Jones 16; Rebs: Magbegor 16; Asts: Oblak 8

Pabellón Príncipe Felipe, Zaragoza
Attendance: 3,082
Referees: Ariadna Chueca (ESP), Paulina Karolina Gajdosz (POL), Péter Praksch (HUN)

11 April 2025
20:30

Boxscore

Valencia Basket (Spain)	66–**68**	(Turkey) **CBK Mersin**
Scoring by quarter: **20**–17, 12–**21**, **14**–12, **20**–18
Pts: Alexander 14; Rebs: Alexander 9 Asts: Romero 5		Pts: Howard 16; Rebs: Howard 8 Asts: three players 4

Pabellón Príncipe Felipe, Zaragoza
Attendance: 4,642
Referees: Gintaras Mačiulis (LTU), Ivana Ivanović (SRB), Mihkel Männiste (EST)

=== Third place match ===
13 April 2025
17:00

Boxscore

**Fenerbahçe Opet** (Turkey)	**59**–49	(Spain) Valencia Basket
Scoring by quarter: 8–**12**, **21**–13, 13–**18**, 7–**16**
Pts: Meesseman 16; Rebs: Meesseman 10; Asts: Williams 7		Pts: Fiebich 15; Rebs: Turner, Mavunga 8 Asts: three players 3

Pabellón Príncipe Felipe, Zaragoza
Attendance: 3,217
Referees: Ventsislav Velikov (BUL), Veronika Obertová (SVK), Péter Praksch (HUN)

=== Final ===
13 April 2025
20:00

Boxscore

CBK Mersin (Turkey)	53–**66**	(Czech Republic) ZVVZ USK Praha
Scoring by quarter: 17–**24**, 12–**18**, **13**–7, 11–**17**
Pts: Howard 19; Rebs: Howard, Rupert 7 Asts: Anderson 4		Pts: Jones 24; Rebs: Jones 11; Asts: Oblak 5

Pabellón Príncipe Felipe, Zaragoza
Attendance: 4,287
Referees: Ariadna Chueca (ESP), Paulina Karolina Gajdosz (POL), Mihkel Männiste (EST)

Starters:			Pts	Reb	Ast
PG	1	(Serbia) Yvonne Anderson	5	4	4
SG	23	(France) Marine Johannès	7	5	3
SF	6	(Canada) Bridget Carleton	15	4	3
PF	00	(United States) Natasha Howard	19	7	1
C	12	(France) Iliana Rupert	7	7	2
Reserves:					
PG	0	(Turkey) Asena Yalçın	DNP		
PG	4	(France) Marine Fauthoux	0	2	2
PF	8	(Spain) María Araújo	0	1	0
SF	10	(Turkey) Sinem Ataş	DNP		
C	32	(France) Christelle Diallo	DNP		
SG	44	(United Kingdom) Karlie Samuelson	0	0	0
SG	99	(Turkey) Pelin Bilgiç	DNP		
Head coach:
(Turkish Basketball Federation) Ahmet Kandemir

**Mersin**	**Praha**

Mersin	Statistics	Praha
14/41 (34.1%)	2-point field goals	16/35 (45.7%)
6/24 (25%)	3-point field goals	9/79 (47.4%)
7/7 (100%)	Free throws	7/12 (58.3%)
11	Offensive rebounds	7
23	Defensive rebounds	34
34	Total rebounds	41
15	Assists	19
12	Steals	10
13	Turnovers	17
3	Blocks	1
17	Fouls	14

2024–25 EuroLeague Women Champions

**ZVVZ USK Praha**
(2nd title)

Starters:			Pts	Reb	Ast
PG	3	(Slovenia) Teja Oblak	1	3	5
SF	8	(Czech Republic) Veronika Voráčková	8	4	4
SF	11	(France) Valériane Ayayi	14	3	4
PF	13	(Australia) Ezi Magbegor	9	10	0
C	42	(United States) Brionna Jones	24	11	0
Reserves:					
SG	1	(Czech Republic) Mariana Přibylová	DNP		
SF	2	(Czech Republic) Karolína Petlánová	DNP		
SG	4	(Czech Republic) Gabriela Andělová	0	0	0
PG	5	(Spain) Maite Cazorla	0	0	3
PG	12	(Czech Republic) Tereza Vyoralová	10	4	0
C	14	(Netherlands) Emese Hof	0	3	3
SG	21	(Czech Republic) Veronika Šípová	DNP		
Head coach:
(Slovak Basketball Association) Natália Hejková

== Awards ==
=== EuroLeague Final Six MVP ===
Player	Team	Ref.
(United States) Brionna Jones	(Czech Republic) ZVVZ USK Praha	

=== EuroLeague Final Six MVP All Star Team ===
PG	SG	SF	PF	C	Ref.
(France) Gabby Williams ( (Turkey) Fenerbahçe Opet)	(France) Valériane Ayayi ( (Czech Republic) ZVVZ USK Praha)	(Australia) Ezi Magbegor ( (Czech Republic) ZVVZ USK Praha)	(United States) Natasha Howard ( (Turkey) CBK Mersin)	(United States) Brionna Jones ( (Czech Republic) ZVVZ USK Praha)	

=== EuroLeague Final Six MVP of the Round ===
Round	PG	SG	SF	PF	C
Quarterfinals	(United Kingdom) Karlie Samuelson ( (Turkey) CBK Mersin)	(United States) Brionna Jones ( (Czech Republic) ZVVZ USK Praha)	(France) Valériane Ayayi ( (Czech Republic) ZVVZ USK Praha)	(Serbia) Yvonne Anderson ( (Turkey) CBK Mersin)	(France) Pauline Astier ( (France) Tango Bourges Basket)
Semifinals	(Belgium) Julie Allemand ( (Turkey) ) Fenerbahçe Opet	(France) Marine Fauthoux ( (Turkey) CBK Mersin)	(Canada) Kayla Alexander ( (Spain) Valencia Basket)	(Australia) Ezi Magbegor ( (Czech Republic) ZVVZ USK Praha)	(United States) Brionna Jones ( (Czech Republic) ZVVZ USK Praha)
