= 2024 EuroLeague Women Final Four =

Basketball tournament in Mersin

- Season: 2023–24 EuroLeague Women

Tournament details
- Arena: Servet Tazegül Arena; Mersin, Turkey
- Dates: 12–14 April 2024

Final positions
- Champions: (Turkey) Fenerbahçe Alagöz Holding (2nd title)
- Runners-up: (France) Villeneuve d'Ascq LM
- Third place: (Czech Republic) ZVVZ USK Praha
- Fourth place: (Turkey) CBK Mersin

Awards and statistics
- MVP: (United States) Kayla McBride

The 2024 EuroLeague Women Final Four was the concluding round of the tournament of the 2023–24 EuroLeague Women season, the 66th season of Europe's premier club basketball tournament, and the 27th edition since being rebranded as the EuroLeague Women. On 7 March 2024, it was announced by FIBA Europe that the Final Four would be played at the Servet Tazegül Arena in Mersin, Turkey, on 12–14 April 2024.

== Venue ==
On 7 March 2024, it was announced by FIBA Europe that the Final Four would be played at the Servet Tazegül Arena in Mersin, Turkey, on 12–14 April 2024.

Mersin	2024 EuroLeague Women Final Four (Europe)
Servet Tazegül Arena	2024 EuroLeague Women Final Four (Europe)
Capacity: 7,500	2024 EuroLeague Women Final Four (Europe)

== Teams ==
Team	Qualified date	Participations (Note: Including Final Four and Final Eights tournaments.) (bold indicates winners)
(Turkey) Fenerbahçe	28 February 2024	9 (2011–12, 2012–13, 2013–14, 2014–15, 2015–16, 2016–17, 2020–21, 2021–22, **2022–23**)
(Turkey) CBK Mersin	6 March 2024	1 (2022–23)
(Czech Republic) ZVVZ USK Praha	6 March 2024	7 (2013–14, **2014–15**, 2015–16, 2016–17, 2018–19, 2021–22, 2022–23)
(France) Villeneuve d'Ascq LM	28 February 2024	0

== Bracket ==
Semifinals
12 April
**(Turkey) Fenerbahçe Alagoz Holding**	**89**
(Turkey) Çukurova Basketbol Mersin	80
12 April
(Czech Republic) ZVVZ USK Praha	78
**(France) Villeneuve d'Ascq LM**	**84**

Final
14 April
**(Turkey) Fenerbahçe Alagoz Holding**	**106**
(France) Villeneuve d'Ascq LM	73
Third place
14 April
(Turkey) Çukurova Basketbol Mersin	67
**(Czech Republic) ZVVZ USK Praha**	**95**

=== Semifinals ===
12 April 2024	ZVVZ USK Praha (Czech Republic)	78–**84**	(France) **Villeneuve d'Ascq LM**	Servet Tazegul Spor Salonu, Mersin
16:00	Scoring by quarter: **27**–26, **16**–11, 19–**26**, 16–**21**
	Pts: Ayayi 24; Rebs: three players 6 Asts: Cazorla 6	Report	Pts: Smalls 18; Rebs: Diaby 9 Asts: Salaün, Smalls 7	Attendance: 2,500; Referees: Cecília Montgomery-Tóth (HUN), Viola Györgyi (ROU), Petar Pesic (SRB)

12 April 2024	**Fenerbahçe Alagoz Holding** (Turkey)	**89**–80	(Turkey) Çukurova Basketbol Mersin	Servet Tazegul Spor Salonu, Mersin
19:00	Scoring by quarter: **27**–20, 21–**22**, 18–**20**, **23**–18
	Pts: McBride 25; Rebs: Milić 11; Asts: Anderson, Meesseman 6	Report	Pts: Mavunga 20; Rebs: Mavunga 8 Asts: Mabrey 8	Attendance: 6,000; Referees: Ariadna Chueca (ESP), Paulo Marques (POR), Gvidas Gedvilas (LTU)

=== Third place game ===
14 April 2024	Çukurova Basketbol Mersin (Turkey)	67–**95**	(Czech Republic) **ZVVZ USK Praha**	Servet Tazegul Spor Salonu, Mersin
16:00	Scoring by quarter: 18–**25**, 18–**27**, **20**–14, 11–**29**
	Pts: Kiss 19; Rebs: Copper, Époupa 7 Asts: Mabrey 6	Report	Pts: Ayayi 21; Rebs: Magbegor 10; Asts: Cazorla 6	Attendance: 1,000; Referees: Paulo Marques (POR), Paulina Karolina Gajdosz (POL), Franko Gracin (CRO)

=== Final ===
14 April 2024	**Fenerbahçe Alagoz Holding** (Turkey)	**106**–73	(France) Villeneuve d'Ascq LM	Servet Tazegul Spor Salonu, Mersin
19:00	Scoring by quarter: **28**–27, **30**–18, **19**–16, **29**–12
	Pts: Collier 33; Rebs: Collier 8 Asts: Anderson 13; PIR: Collier 36	Report	Pts: Burke, Zellous 17; Rebs: Salaün 9 Asts: Lisowa-Mbaka 5 PIR: Salaün 18	Attendance: 6,000; Referees: Ariadna Chueca (ESP), Viola Györgyi (ROU), Gvidas Gedvilas (LTU)

Starters:			Pts	Reb	Ast
PG	12	(Serbia) Yvonne Anderson	7	6	13
SG	21	(United States) Kayla McBride	17	7	7
SF	24	(United States) Napheesa Collier	33	8	4
PF	11	(Belgium) Emma Meesseman	22	5	6
C	13	(Serbia) Nikolina Milić	16	3	1
Reserves:					
SG	2	(Turkey) Sevgi Uzun	3	1	0
F	9	(Turkey) İdil Saçalır	0	1	0
SG	10	(Turkey) Alperi Onar	2	0	2
PF	15	(Turkey) Tilbe Şenyürek	2	0	0
C	22	(France) Marième Badiane	4	1	5
G	25	(Montenegro) Marija Leković	0	0	1
SF	33	(Latvia) Kitija Laksa	0	0	1
Head coach:
(French Federation of Basketball) Valérie Garnier

**Fenerbahçe**	**ESBVA-LM**

Fenerbahçe	Statistics	ESBVA-LM
34/50 (68%)	2-point field goals	16/36 (44.4%)
4/14 (28.6%)	3-point field goals	9/27 (33.3%)
26/29 (89.7%)	Free throws	14/21 (66.7%)
10	Offensive rebounds	12
28	Defensive rebounds	16
38	Total rebounds	28
40	Assists	17
11	Steals	8
15	Turnovers	20
3	Blocks	2
21	Fouls	24

2023–24 EuroLeague Women champions

**Fenerbahçe**
(2nd title)

Starters:			Pts	Reb	Ast
PG	1	(United States) Shavonte Zellous	17	3	4
SG	3	(United States) Kamiah Smalls	12	3	3
SF	25	(United States) Kennedy Burke	17	4	2
PF	31	(France) Janelle Salaün	12	9	1
C	22	(Ivory Coast) Kariata Diaby	6	4	1
Reserves:					
C	5	(France) Aminata Gueye	3	0	0
PG	6	(France) Caroline Heriaud	0	2	0
G	10	(France) Charlotte Abraham	0	0	0
SF	20	(Belgium) Bethy Mununga	0	1	1
SF	33	(Belgium) Maxuella Lisowa-Mbaka	6	0	5
Head coach:
(French Federation of Basketball) Rachid Meziane
