= 2022 EuroLeague Women Final Four =

Basketball tournament in Istanbul

- Season: 2021–22 EuroLeague Women

Tournament details
- Arena: Ülker Sports and Event Hall; Istanbul, Turkey
- Dates: 8–10 April 2022

Final positions
- Champions: (Hungarian Basketball Federation) Sopron Basket (1st title)
- Runners-up: (Turkish Basketball Federation) Fenerbahçe
- Third place: (Spanish Basketball Federation) Perfumerías Avenida
- Fourth place: (Czech Basketball Federation) ZVVZ USK Praha

Awards and statistics
- MVP: (France) Gabby Williams

The 2022 EuroLeague Women Final Four was the concluding round of the tournament of the 2021–22 EuroLeague Women season, the 64th season of Europe's premier club basketball tournament, and the 25th edition since being rebranded as the EuroLeague Women. On 22 March 2022, it was announced by FIBA Europe that the Final Four would be played at the Ülker Sports and Event Hall in Istanbul, Turkey, on 8–10 April 2022.

== Venue ==
On 22 March 2022, it was announced by FIBA Europe that the Final Four would be played at the Ülker Sports and Event Hall in Istanbul, Turkey, on 8–10 April 2022.

Istanbul	2022 EuroLeague Women Final Four (Europe)
Ülker Sports and Event Hall	2022 EuroLeague Women Final Four (Europe)
Capacity: 13,800	2022 EuroLeague Women Final Four (Europe)

== Teams ==
Team	Qualified date	Participations (Note: Including Final Four and Final Eights tournaments.) (bold indicates winners)
(Turkey) Fenerbahçe	10 March 2022	7 (2011–12, 2012–13, 2013–14, 2014–15, 2015–16, 2016–17, 2020–21)
(Hungary) Sopron Basket	10 March 2022	4 (2008–09, 2017–18, 2018–19, 2020–21)
(Czech Republic) ZVVZ USK Praha	18 March 2022	5 (2013–14, **2014–15**, 2015–16, 2016–17, 2018–19)
(Spain) Perfumerías Avenida	19 March 2022	3 (2008–09, **2010–11**, 2020–21)

== Bracket ==
Semifinals
8 April
(Spain) Perfumerías Avenida	69
**(Hungary) Sopron Basket**	**74**
8 April
(Czech Republic) ZVVZ USK Praha	74
**(Turkey) Fenerbahçe**	**83**

Final
10 April
**(Hungary) Sopron Basket**	**60**
(Turkey) Fenerbahçe	55
Third place
10 April
**(Spain) Perfumerías Avenida**	**71**
(Czech Republic) ZVVZ USK Praha	59

== Semifinals ==
8 April 2022	Perfumerías Avenida (Spain)	69–**74**	(Hungary) **Sopron Basket**	Istanbul
17:00 (UTC+3)	Scoring by quarter: 13–**22**, 18–**25**, **21**–17, **17**–10
	Pts: Copper 23; Rebs: Copper, Alarie 6 Asts: Rodríguez, Cazorla 3 PIR: Copper 15	Boxscore	Pts: Brooks 27; Rebs: Határ 10; Asts: Williams 6 PIR: Brooks 26	Arena: Ülker Sports and Event Hall; Attendance: 1,035; Referees: Jelena Tomić (CRO), Beniamino Manuel Attard (ITA), Mihkel Männiste (EST)

8 April 2022	ZVVZ USK Praha (Czech Republic)	74–**83**	(Turkey) **Fenerbahçe**	Istanbul
20:00 (UTC+3)	Scoring by quarter: 23–**28**, **22**–10, 18–**21**, 11–**24**
	Pts: Oblak 22; Rebs: Thomas 14; Asts: Thomas 8 PIR: Oblak 24	Boxscore	Pts: Iagupova 24; Rebs: Williams 11; Asts: Iagupova 7 PIR: Iagupova 27	Arena: Ülker Sports and Event Hall; Attendance: 5,970; Referees: Paulo Marques (POR), Amel Dahra (FRA), Gatis Saliņš (LAT)

== Third place game ==
10 April 2022	**Perfumerías Avenida** (Spain)	**71**–59	(Czech Republic) ZVVZ USK Praha	Istanbul
14:00 (UTC+3)	Scoring by quarter: 12–**19**, **20**–18, **22**–9, **17**–13
	Pts: Samuelson 25; Rebs: Copper 8 Asts: Copper, Cazorla 5 PIR: Samuelson 28	Boxscore	Pts: Jones 26; Rebs: Thomas 9 Asts: Voráčková 7 PIR: Voráčková, Jones 23	Arena: Ülker Sports and Event Hall; Attendance: 300; Referees: Özlem Yalman (TUR), Jelena Tomić (CRO), Viola Györgyi (ROU)

== Final ==
10 April 2022	**Sopron Basket** (Hungary)	**60**–55	(Turkey) Fenerbahçe	Istanbul
17:00 (UTC+3)	Scoring by quarter: **16**–6, 13–13, 16–**19**, 15–**17**
	Pts: Williams 16; Rebs: Brooks 11; Asts: Williams, Fegyverneky 3 PIR: Williams 17	Boxscore	Pts: Iagupova 13; Rebs: Williams 8 Asts: Iagupova 5 PIR: Çakır 12	Arena: Ülker Sports and Event Hall; Attendance: 9,500; Referees: Paulo Marques (POR), Beniamino Manuel Attard (ITA) Gatis Saliņš (LAT)

Starters:			Pts	Reb	Ast
PG	4	(Hungary) Zsófia Fegyverneky	12	5	3
SG	20	(United States) Briann January	11	4	1
SF	3	(France) Gabby Williams	16	4	3
PF	32	(Serbia) Jelena Brooks	9	11	2
C	14	(Hungary) Bernadett Határ	10	7	0
Reserves:					
F	8	(Hungary) Aliz Varga	0	0	0
SG	9	(Serbia) Nevena Jovanović	0	1	0
F	10	(Hungary) Zsuzsanna Sitku	DNP		
G/F	12	(Hungary) Dalma Czukor	0	1	0
C	31	(United States) Stefanie Dolson	2	7	1
PG	44	(Hungary) Sara Varga	DNP		
Head coach:
(Hungarian Basketball Federation) Dávid Gáspár

**Sopron Basket**	**Fenerbahçe**

Sopron	Statistics	Fenerbahçe
17/40 (42.5%)	2-point field goals	15/36 (41.7%)
5/19 (26.3%)	3-point field goals	5/26 (19.2%)
11/18 (61.1%)	Free throws	10/17 (58.8%)
10	Offensive rebounds	11
34	Defensive rebounds	27
44	Total rebounds	38
10	Assists	12
9	Steals	7
13	Turnovers	13
2	Blocks	2
19	Fouls	19

2021–22 EuroLeague Women champions

**Sopron Basket**
(1st title)

Starters:			Pts	Reb	Ast
PG	4	(Turkey) Olcay Çakır	11	2	1
SG	21	(United States) Kayla McBride	2	4	1
SF	23	(Ukraine) Alina Iagupova	13	5	5
PF	0	(Germany) Satou Sabally	9	2	2
C	11	(United States) Elizabeth Williams	5	5	3
Reserves:					
C	1	(Sweden) Amanda Zahui B.	12	5	0
G/F	3	(Turkey) Manolya Kurtulmuş	DNP		
PG	10	(Turkey) Alperi Onar	DNP		
PF	12	(Turkey) Tuğçe Canıtez	DNP		
F	25	(Turkey) Banu Şimşek	DNP		
SG	32	(France) Bria Hartley	3	3	0
C	41	(Turkey) Kiah Stokes	DNP		
Head coach:
(Spanish Basketball Federation) Víctor Lapeña
