= 2023 EuroLeague Women Final Four =

Basketball tournament in Prague

- Season: 2022–23 EuroLeague Women

Tournament details
- Arena: Královka Arena; Prague, Czech Republic
- Dates: 14–16 April 2023

Final positions
- Champions: (Turkish Basketball Federation) Fenerbahçe (1st title)
- Runners-up: (Turkish Basketball Federation) ÇBK Mersin
- Third place: (Italian Basketball Federation) Beretta Famila Schio
- Fourth place: (Czech Basketball Federation) ZVVZ USK Praha

Awards and statistics
- MVP: (United States) Breanna Stewart

The 2023 EuroLeague Women Final Four was the concluding round of the tournament of the 2022–23 EuroLeague Women season, the 65th season of Europe's premier club basketball tournament, and the 26th edition since being rebranded as the EuroLeague Women. On 27 March 2023, it was announced by FIBA Europe that the Final Four would be played at the Královka Arena in Prague, Czech Republic, on 14–16 April 2023.

== Venue ==
On 27 March 2023, it was announced by FIBA Europe that the Final Four would be played at the Královka Arena in Prague, Czech Republic, on 14–16 April 2023.

Prague	2023 EuroLeague Women Final Four (Europe)
Královka Arena	2023 EuroLeague Women Final Four (Europe)
Capacity: 2,500	2023 EuroLeague Women Final Four (Europe)

== Teams ==
Team	Qualified date	Participations (Note: Including Final Four and Final Eights tournaments.) (bold indicates winners)
(Turkey) Fenerbahçe	17 March 2023	8 (2011–12, 2012–13, 2013–14, 2014–15, 2015–16, 2016–17, 2020–21, 2021–22)
(Turkey) ÇBK Mersin	22 March 2023	None
(Czech Republic) ZVVZ USK Praha	22 March 2023	6 (2013–14, **2014–15**, 2015–16, 2016–17, 2018–19, 2021–22)
(Italy) Beretta Famila Schio	22 March 2023	2 (2011–12, 2012–13)

== Bracket ==
Semifinals
14 April
**(Turkish Basketball Federation) Fenerbahçe**	**77**
(Italian Basketball Federation) Beretta Famila Schio	70
14 April
(Czech Basketball Federation) ZVVZ USK Praha	58
**(Turkish Basketball Federation) ÇBK Mersin Yenişehir Bld.**	**78**

Final
16 April
**(Turkish Basketball Federation) Fenerbahçe**	**99**
(Turkish Basketball Federation) ÇBK Mersin Yenişehir Bld.	60
Third place
16 April
**(Italian Basketball Federation) Beretta Famila Schio**	**59**
(Czech Basketball Federation) ZVVZ USK Praha	56

=== Semifinals ===
14 April 2023	**Fenerbahçe** (Turkish Basketball Federation)	**77**–70	(Italian Basketball Federation) Beretta Famila Schio	Prague
15:00 (UTC+2)	Scoring by quarter: 16–**21**, **20**–19, **25**–14, 16–16
	Pts: Stewart 24; Rebs: Stewart 11; Asts: Vandersloot 11; PIR: Stewart 29	Boxscore	Pts: Keys 19; Rebs: Howard 9 Asts: three players 4 PIR: Keys 21	Arena: Královka Arena; Attendance: 2,154; Referees: Viola Györgyi (ROU), Gatis Saliņš (LAT), Martin Vulić (CRO)

14 April 2023	ZVVZ USK Praha (Czech Basketball Federation)	58–**78**	(Turkish Basketball Federation) **ÇBK Mersin Yenişehir Bld.**	Prague
18:00 (UTC+2)	Scoring by quarter: 18–**24**, **22**–20, 9–**18**, 9–**16**
	Pts: Vukosavljević 15; Rebs: Thomas 12; Asts: Thomas 6 PIR: Thomas 17	Boxscore	Pts: Hayes 19; Rebs: Crvendakić 12; Asts: Gray 9 PIR: Williams 26	Arena: Královka Arena; Attendance: 2,500; Referees: Andris Aunkrogers (LAT), Michał Proc (POL), Carsten Straube (GER)

=== Third place game ===
16 April 2023	**Beretta Famila Schio** (Italian Basketball Federation)	**59**–56	(Czech Basketball Federation) ZVVZ USK Praha	Prague
17:00 (UTC+2)	Scoring by quarter: **23**–14, **16**–14, 9–**14**, 11–**14**
	Pts: Mabrey 17; Rebs: Keys, Ndour-Fall 6 Asts: Verona, Sottana 3 PIR: Ndour-Fall 15	Boxscore	Pts: Oblak 17; Rebs: Jones 15; Asts: Oblak, Vukosavljević 4 PIR: Thomas 22	Arena: Královka Arena; Attendance: 2,500; Referees: Cecília Tóth (HUN), Esperanza Mendoza Holgado (ESP), Amel Dahra (FRA)

=== Final ===
16 April 2023	**Fenerbahçe** (Turkish Basketball Federation)	**99**–60	(Turkish Basketball Federation) ÇBK Mersin Yenişehir Bld.	Prague
20:00 (UTC+2)	Scoring by quarter: **29**–17, **28**–7, 20–20, **22**–16
	Pts: Stewart 35; Rebs: Meesseman 7 Asts: Vandersloot, McBride 5 PIR: Stewart 36	Boxscore	Pts: four players 10; Rebs: Crvendakić 7 Asts: Gray 6 PIR: Crvendakić 15	Arena: Královka Arena; Attendance: 2,500; Referees: Andris Aunkrogers (LAT), Viola Györgyi (ROU), Gatis Saliņš (LAT)

Starters:			Pts	Reb	Ast
PG	4	(Turkey) Olcay Çakır	11	0	2
SG	21	(United States) Kayla McBride	16	6	5
SF	23	(Ukraine) Alina Iagupova	7	1	3
PF	30	(United States) Breanna Stewart	35	6	3
C	11	(Belgium) Emma Meesseman	10	7	3
Reserves:					
SG	0	(Germany) Satou Sabally	11	4	2
PF	8	(Serbia) Mina Đorđević	0	1	0
PG	10	(Turkey) Alperi Onar	4	0	4
PF	14	(Serbia) Ivana Raca	0	0	1
PG	22	(Hungary) Courtney Vandersloot	5	5	5
PG	36	(Turkey) Merve Aydin	0	0	0
C	41	(United States) Kiah Stokes	0	4	0
Head coach:
(Basketball Federation of Serbia) Marina Maljković

**Fenerbahçe**	**Mersin**

Fenerbahçe	Statistics	Mersin
23/47 (48.9%)	2-point field goals	16/36 (44.4%)
21/21 (57.1%)	3-point field goals	6/16 (37.5%)
17/20 (85%)	Free throws	10/15 (66.7%)
13	Offensive rebounds	9
23	Defensive rebounds	20
36	Total rebounds	29
28	Assists	15
12	Steals	5
8	Turnovers	20
1	Blocks	1
20	Fouls	23

2022–23 EuroLeague Women champions

**Fenerbahçe**
(1st title)

Starters:			Pts	Reb	Ast
PG	5	(Netherlands) Laura Cornelius	10	4	4
SG	12	(United States) Chelsea Gray	9	0	6
SF	15	(United States) Tiffany Hayes	3	2	1
PF	21	(Serbia) Aleksandra Crvendakić	10	7	3
C	11	(United States) Elizabeth Williams	10	5	0
Reserves:					
PG	0	(Turkey) Asena Yalçın	2	0	0
SF	1	(Turkey) Gamze Takmaz	0	0	0
PF	2	(Montenegro) Jelena Dubljević	4	1	0
PG	6	(Turkey) Gökşen Fitik	0	1	0
SF	10	(Turkey) Sinem Ataş	10	2	0
C	13	(Turkey) Quanitra Hollingsworth	2	4	0
C	33	(Turkey) Esra Ural	0	0	1
Head coach:
(Spanish Basketball Federation) Roberto Íñiguez
