= Laura Nicholls (basketball) =

Spanish basketball player

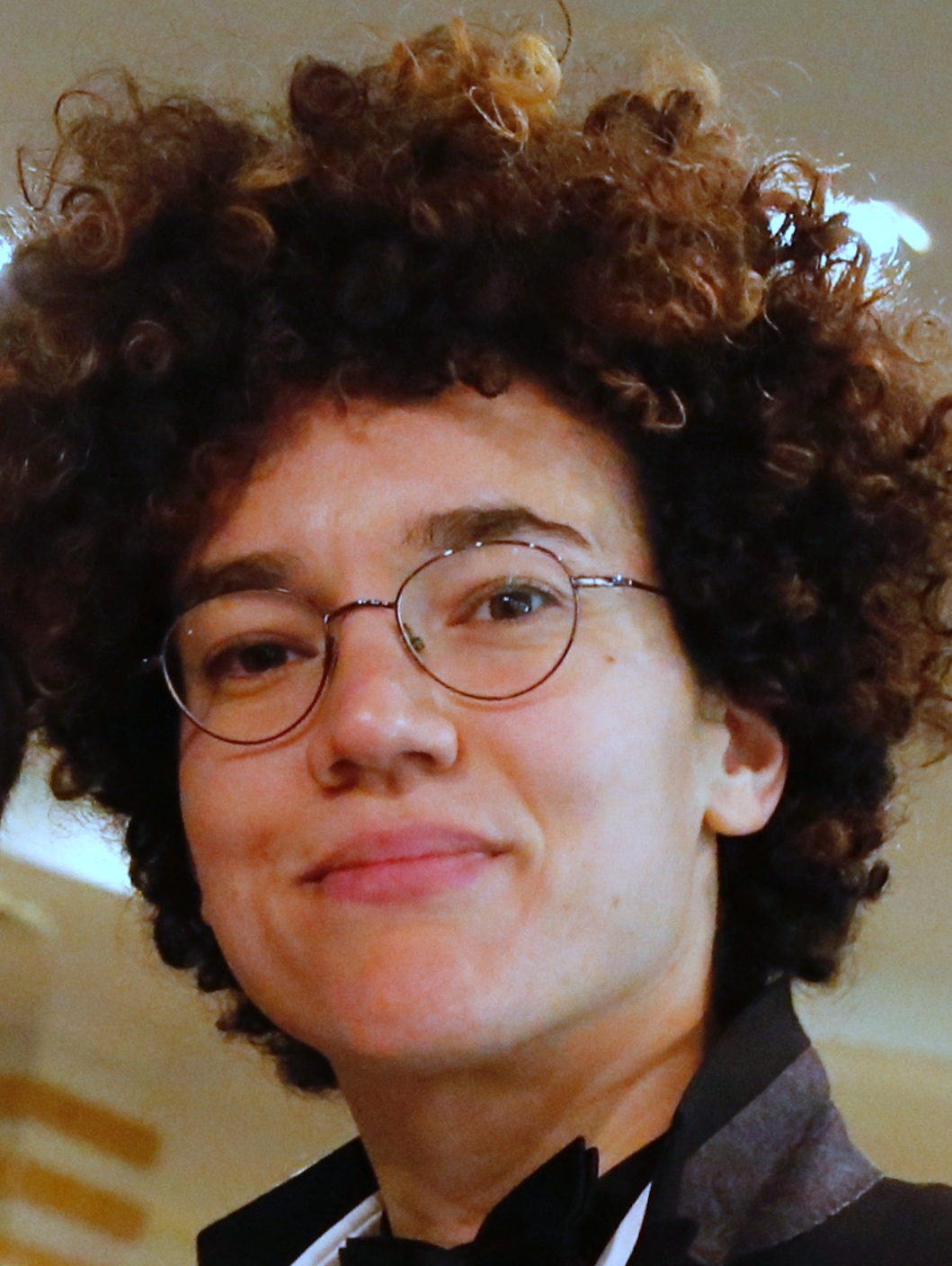

Personal information
- Born: 26 February 1989 (age 37) Santander, Cantabria, Spain
- Listed height: 6 ft 3 in (1.91 m)
- Listed weight: 198 lb (90 kg)

Career information
- Playing career: 2007–present
- Position: Power forward / center

Career history
- 2007–2009: Celta Vigo
- 2009–2010: Hondarribia-Irún
- 2010–2014: Rivas Ecópolis
- 2014–2015: Kayseri Kaski
- 2015–2016: WBC Wisła Kraków
- 2016–2017: Virtus Eirene Ragusa
- 2017–2018: CB Avenida
- 2018–2019: Nadezhda Orenburg
- 2019–2020: Fenerbahçe Öznur Kablo
- 2020–2024: Casademont Zaragoza

Career highlights
- EuroCup champion (2019); 2× Spanish League champion (2014, 2018); 3× Spanish Cup Champion (2011, 2013, 2018); Turkish Women's Basketball Cup champion (2020); Polish League Champion (2016)

Laura Nicholls González (Note: In this Spanish name, the first or paternal surname is Nicholls and the second or maternal family name is González.) (born 26 February 1989) is a Spanish former basketball player. She was a regular member of the Spain women's national basketball team since 2008, having won eight medals in final tournaments.

== Club career ==
She started playing as a child in Cantabria before moving to Catalonia as a junior in 2004 to play at Segle XXI, a club which works in lower division developing young prospects. Her first club in the top tier of the Spanish League was Celta Vigourbán in 2007, at 18 years of age. For good performance in the season she received her first call-up with the Spanish senior team for the 2008 Olympics in Beijing. The following year she transferred to Hondarribia-Irún for one just season before signing with Rivas Ecópoolis, where she played from 2010–11 to 2013–14, winning one Spanish League in 2014 and two Spanish Cups in 2011 and 2013, and playing for four seasons in the EuroLeague Women, reaching the final in the 2011–12 EuroLeague edition.

She played the next three seasons in three different countries: Kayseri Kaski S.K. from Turkey, Wisła Kraków from Poland (winning the Polish League) and Virtus Eirene Ragusa from Italy. She went back to Spain to play for CB Perfumerías Avenida in 2017. She signed for Russian team Nadezhda Orenburg for the 2018-19 season, winning the 2018-19 EuroCup Women. In 2019, she signed for Turkish team Fenerbahçe Öznur Kablo. In 2020, she signed with Casademont Zaragoza of La Liga Feminina.

=== European cups statistics ===
| Season | Team | GP | MPP | PPP | RPP | APP |
|---|---|---|---|---|---|---|
| 2010–11 EuroLeague | (Spain) Rivas Ecopolis | 12 | 13.9 | 4.2 | 2.4 | 0.6 |
| 2011–12 EuroLeague | (Spain) Rivas Ecopolis | 21 | 26.0 | 7.6 | 6.5 | 1.4 |
| 2012–13 EuroLeague | (Spain) Rivas Ecopolis | 11 | 26.6 | 5.2 | 5.0 | 1.5 |
| 2013–14 EuroLeague | (Spain) Rivas Ecopolis | 15 | 35.4 | 14.0 | 8.6 | 1.5 |
| 2014–15 EuroLeague | (Turkey) Kayseri Kaski | 11 | 25.8 | 6.4 | 5.2 | 1.5 |
| 2015–16 EuroLeague | (Poland) WBC Wisla Krakow | 15 | 33.7 | 9.4 | 7.1 | 2.7 |
| 2016–17 EuroCup | (Italy) Virtus Eirene Ragusa | 8 | 29.3 | 7.9 | 7.8 | 1.1 |
| 2017–18 EuroLeague | (Spain) Perfumerías Avenida | 14 | 23.2 | 5.0 | 4.6 | 0.9 |
| 2017–18 EuroCup | (Spain) Perfumerías Avenida | 4 | 18.7 | 4.0 | 4.0 | 0.8 |
| 2018–19 EuroLeague | (Russia) Nadezhda Orenburg | 6 | 33.3 | 6.8 | 8.2 | 3.0 |
| 2018–19 EuroCup | (Russia) Nadezhda Orenburg | 6 | 33.8 | 5.5 | 7.5 | 2.7 |
| 2019–20 EuroLeague | (Turkey) Fenerbahçe Öznur Kablo | | | | | |

== National team ==
In the Spanish youth teams since she was 15, she won medals in tournaments of all age groups (U-16, U-18, U-20).

She made her debut with the Spanish senior team at 19, and has been in all tournaments that the team has played. She is one of the most capped players with a total of 157 caps and 4.9 PPG. She participated in two Olympic Games, two World Championships and in six European Championships:

- 2004 FIBA Europe Under-16 Championship (youth)
- 2005 FIBA Europe Under-16 Championship (youth)
- 2006 FIBA Europe Under-18 Championship (youth)
- 2007 FIBA Europe Under-18 Championship (youth)
- 4th 2007 FIBA Under-19 World Championship (youth)
- 2009 FIBA Europe Under-20 Championship (youth)
- 5th 2008 Summer Olympics
- 2009 Eurobasket
- 2010 World Championship
- 9th 2011 Eurobasket
- 2013 Eurobasket
- 2014 World Championship
- 2015 Eurobasket
- 2016 Summer Olympics
- 2017 Eurobasket
- 2018 World Championship
- 2019 Eurobasket

== Personal life ==
Nicholls is of Curaçaoan descent through her paternal grandfather.
