= 2021 EuroLeague Women Final Four =

Basketball tournament in Istanbul

- Season: 2020–21 EuroLeague Women

Tournament details
- Arena: Volkswagen Arena; Istanbul, Turkey
- Dates: 16–18 April 2021

Final positions
- Champions: (Russian Basketball Federation) UMMC Ekaterinburg (6th title)
- Runners-up: (Spanish Basketball Federation) Perfumerías Avenida
- Third place: (Turkish Basketball Federation) Fenerbahçe
- Fourth place: (Hungarian Basketball Federation) Sopron Basket

Awards and statistics
- MVP: (United States) Breanna Stewart

The 2021 EuroLeague Women Final Four was the concluding round of the tournament of the 2020–21 EuroLeague Women season, the 63rd season of Europe's premier club basketball tournament, and the 24th edition since being rebranded as the EuroLeague Women. On 26 March 2021, it was announced by FIBA Europe that the Final Four would be played at the Volkswagen Arena in Istanbul, Turkey, on 16–18 April 2021.

== Venue ==
On 26 March 2021, it was announced by FIBA Europe that the Final Four would be played at the Volkswagen Arena in Istanbul, Turkey, on 16–18 April 2021.

Istanbul	2021 EuroLeague Women Final Four (Europe)
Volkswagen Arena	2021 EuroLeague Women Final Four (Europe)
Capacity: 5,240	2021 EuroLeague Women Final Four (Europe)

== Teams ==
Team	Qualified date	Participations (Note: Including Final Four and Final Eights tournaments.) (bold indicates winners)
(Russia) UMMC Ekaterinburg	19 March 2021	13 (**2002–03**, 2007–08, 2008–09, 2009–10, 2010–11, 2011–12, **2012–13**, 2013–14, 2014–15, **2015–16**, 2016–17, **2017–18**, **2018–19**)
(Turkey) Fenerbahçe	19 March 2021	6 (2011–12, 2012–13, 2013–14, 2014–15, 2015–16, 2016–17)
(Hungary) Sopron Basket	19 March 2021	3 (2008–09, 2017–18, 2018–19)
(Spain) Perfumerías Avenida	19 March 2021	2 (2008–09, **2010–11**)

== Bracket ==
Semifinals
16 April
**(Spain) Perfumerías Avenida**	**72**
(Hungary) Sopron Basket	61
16 April
(Turkey) Fenerbahçe	84
**(Russia) UMMC Ekaterinburg**	**88**

Final
18 April
(Spain) Perfumerías Avenida	68
**(Russia) UMMC Ekaterinburg**	**78**
Third place
18 April
(Hungary) Sopron Basket	58
**(Turkey) Fenerbahçe**	**64**

== Semifinals ==
16 April 2021	Fenerbahçe (Turkey)	84–**88**	(Russia) **UMMC Ekaterinburg**	Istanbul
16:00 (UTC+3)	Scoring by quarter: 21–**22**, 27–**33**, 13–13, **23**–20
	Pts: Iagupova 26; Rebs: Stokes 7 Asts: Iagupova 8	Boxscore	Pts: Quigley 27; Rebs: Griner, Stewart 8 Asts: Vandersloot 6	Arena: Volkswagen Arena; Referees: Carsten Straube (GER), Beniamino Manuel Attard (ITA), Gatis Saliņš (LAT)

16 April 2021	**Perfumerías Avenida** (Spain)	**72**–61	(Hungary) Sopron Basket	Istanbul
21:00 (UTC+3)	Scoring by quarter: **16**–10, 14–**22**, **20**–10, **22**–19
	Pts: Hayes 25; Rebs: Kar. Samuelson 6 Asts: Domínguez 7	Boxscore	Pts: January 15; Rebs: Krajišnik 11; Asts: January 4	Arena: Volkswagen Arena; Referees: Jasmina Juras (SRB), Ventsislav Velikov (BUL), Martin Vulić (CRO)

== Third place game ==
18 April 2021	Sopron Basket (Hungary)	58–**64**	(Turkey) **Fenerbahçe**	Istanbul
15:00 (UTC+3)	Scoring by quarter: 9–**22**, **22**–14, **15**–11, 12–**17**
	Pts: Brooks 21; Rebs: Krajišnik 17; Asts: Fegyverneky 7	Boxscore	Pts: McBride 15; Rebs: McBride 10; Asts: Çakır, Iagupova 4	Arena: Volkswagen Arena; Referees: Andrada Csender (ROU), Ventsislav Velikov (BUL), Amel Dahra (FRA)

== Final ==
18 April 2021	Perfumerías Avenida (Spain)	68–**78**	(Russia) **UMMC Ekaterinburg**	Istanbul
19:00 (UTC+3)	Scoring by quarter: **21**–16, 9–**23**, **23**–20, 15–**19**
	Pts: Hayes 29; Rebs: Kat. Samuelson 6 Asts: Rodríguez 5	Boxscore	Pts: Meesseman 19; Rebs: Jones 11; Asts: Vandersloot 12	Arena: Volkswagen Arena; Referees: Özlem Yalman (TUR), Jasmina Juras (SRB), Martin Vulić (CRO)

Starters:			Pts	Reb	Ast
PG	6	(Spain) Silvia Domínguez	0	3	3
SG	12	(Azerbaijan) Tiffany Hayes	29	5	4
SF	44	(United States) Karlie Samuelson	7	5	1
PF	33	(United States) Katie Lou Samuelson	6	6	0
C	21	(Netherlands) Emese Hof	8	3	1
Reserves:					
SG	4	(Spain) Leonor Rodríguez	5	2	5
G	5	(Spain) Maite Cazorla	3	0	0
PF	10	(Bosnia and Herzegovina) Marica Gajić	DNP		
SG	13	(Spain) Andrea Vilaró	DNP		
C	15	(Spain) Umo Diallo	DNP		
C	22	(Serbia) Nikolina Milić	8	2	0
C	31	(United States) Bella Alarie	2	0	1
Head coach:
(Spanish Basketball Federation) Roberto Íñiguez

**Avenida**	**Ekaterinburg**

Avenida	Statistics	Ekaterinburg
24/55 (43.6%)	2-point field goals	22/45 (48.9%)
5/17 (29.4%)	3-point field goals	5/15 (33.3%)
5/6 (83.3%)	Free throws	19/21 (90.5%)
10	Offensive rebounds	13
20	Defensive rebounds	33
30	Total rebounds	46
15	Assists	25
8	Steals	2
6	Turnovers	15
2	Blocks	6
18	Fouls	10

2020–21 EuroLeague Women champions

**UMMC Ekaterinburg**
(6th title)

Starters:			Pts	Reb	Ast
PG	22	(Belgium) Courtney Vandersloot	12	2	12
SG	14	(Hungary) Allie Quigley	9	4	1
SF	30	(United States) Breanna Stewart	12	6	3
PF	33	(Belgium) Emma Meesseman	19	8	3
C	42	(United States) Brittney Griner	14	8	2
Reserves:					
PG	1	(Russia) Viktoriia Zavialova	DNP		
F	5	(Russia) Evgeniya Belyakova	DNP		
F	7	(Spain) Alba Torrens	3	3	2
PG	13	(Russia) Elena Beglova	0	1	2
PF	31	(Russia) Maryia Papova	DNP		
C	35	(Bosnia and Herzegovina) Jonquel Jones	9	11	0
C	77	(Russia) Maria Vadeeva	DNP		
Head coach:
(Spanish Basketball Federation) Miguel Méndez
