= Leonor Rodríguez =

Spanish basketball player

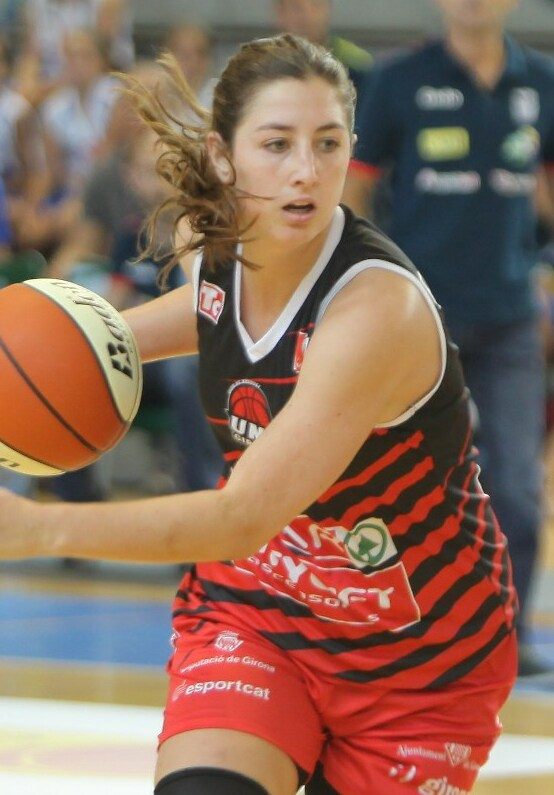

No. 4 – Perfumerías Avenida
- Position: Shooting guard
- League: LF

Personal information
- Born: 21 October 1991 (age 35) Las Palmas, Spain
- Listed height: 5 ft 11 in (1.80 m)

Career information
- Playing career: 2007–2024

Career history
- 2007–2009: CB Islas Canarias
- 2009–2013: Florida State Seminoles
- 2013–2016: Perfumerías Avenida
- 2016–2017: Uni Girona CB
- 2017–2019: WBC Wisła Kraków
- 2019–2020: Çukurova Basketbol
- 2020–2024: Perfumerías Avenida

Career highlights
- 2× Spanish League champion (2016, 2021); 2× Spanish Cup champion (2014, 2015)

Leonor del Pilar Rodríguez Manso (Note: In this Spanish name, the first or paternal surname is Rodríguez and the second or maternal family name is Manso.) (born 21 October 1991) is a Spanish former international basketball player for Perfumerías Avenida and the Spanish national team.

In 2014 she participated at the 2014 FIBA World Championship winning the silver medal. In 2016 she won the silver medal in the 2016 Summer Olympics in Río. In 2017 she won the gold medal in the EuroBasket Women 2017 in Prague

== Club career ==
Rodríguez started playing basketball as a junior in CB Islas Canarias in her native Canary Islands, playing in the Spanish top-tier league in the 2007–08 and 2008–09 seasons. At 18 she moved abroad to play in the NCAA for the Florida State Seminoles, averaging 14.9 PPG in her last year. Back in Europe, she signed for one of the Spanish top teams, Perfumerías Avenida, winning one Spanish League and two Cups in three seasons. She spent one season at Uni Girona CB before signing for Polish team Wisła Can-Pack Kraków in 2017. In 2019 she transferred to Turkish team Çukurova Basketbol and the following season she returned to Spain to win the 2021 Spanish League with Perfumerías Avenida.

=== European cups stats ===
Season	Team	GP	MPP	PPP	RPP	APP
2007-08 EuroCup	(Spain) CB Islas Canarias	5	19.4	7.2	1.0	1.0
2008-09 EuroCup	(Spain) CB Islas Canarias	5	11.8	4.2	2.0	0.8
2013-14 EuroLeague	(Spain) Perfumerías Avenida	14	21.6	6.7	1.2	2.0
2014-15 EuroLeague	(Spain) Perfumerías Avenida	13	12.1	2.6	1.7	0.4
2015-16 EuroLeague	(Spain) Perfumerías Avenida	14	18.6	7.5	2.1	0.8
2016-17 EuroCup	(Spain) Spar Citylift Girona	10	26.5	12.9	4.0	2.2
2017-18 EuroLeague	(Poland) Wisła Can-Pack Kraków	14	31.6	15.0	3.2	3.1
2018-19 EuroCup	(Poland) Wisła Can-Pack Kraków	10	30.1	16.1	3.6	3.2
2019-20 EuroLeague	(Turkey) Çukurova Basketbol	9	29.9	12.2	4.9	2.8
2020-21 EuroLeague	(Spain) Perfumerías Avenida	10	15.1	4.0	2.1	1.8

=== Florida State statistics ===
Legend
GP	Games played	GS	Games started	MPG	Minutes per game
FG%	Field goal percentage	3P%	3-point field goal percentage	FT%	Free throw percentage
RPG	Rebounds per game	APG	Assists per game	SPG	Steals per game
BPG	Blocks per game	PPG	Points per game	**Bold**	Career high

Year	Team	GP	Points	FG%	3P%	FT%	RPG	APG	SPG	BPG	PPG
2009-10	Florida State	15	41	**50.0%**	33.3%	61.5%	1.5	0.6	0.1	0.1	2.7
2010-11	Florida State	10	28	38.5%	33.3%	**100.0%**	1.1	0.3	0.4	-	2.8
2011-12	Florida State	31	148	43.4%	**38.1%**	75.0%	2.7	2.7	0.6	**0.1**	4.8
2012-13	Florida State	**33**	**491**	45.1%	35.4%	78.8%	**3.6**	**3.2**	**2.0**	0.1	**14.9**
Career		89	708	44.7%	36.0%	77.1%	2.7	2.2	1.0	0.1	8.0

== Team overview ==
Seasons	League	Team
2007-2009	(Spain) Spanish League	CB Islas Canarias
2009-2013	(United States) NCAA	Florida State Seminoles
2013-2016	(Spain) Spanish League	Perfumerías Avenida
2016-2017	(Spain) Spanish League	Spar Citylift Girona
2017-2019	(Poland) BLK	Wisla Can-Pack
2019-2020	(Turkey) TKBL	Çukurova Basketbol
2020–present	(Spain) Spanish League	Perfumerías Avenida

== National team ==
Rodríguez started playing with Spain's youth teams at 15, winning a total of seix medals from 2006 to 2011. She made her debut with the senior team in 2014, when she was 22 years old. Up to 2021, she had 97 caps with 4.2 PPG, participating in two Olympic Games, one World Championship and three European Championships:

- 2006 FIBA Europe Under-16 Championship (youth)
- 2007 FIBA Europe Under-16 Championship (youth)
- 5th 2008 FIBA Europe Under-18 Championship (youth)
- 2009 FIBA Europe Under-18 Championship (youth)
- 2009 FIBA Under-19 World Championship (youth)
- 2010 FIBA Europe Under-20 Championship (youth)
- 2011 FIBA Europe Under-20 Championship (youth)
- 2014 World Championship
- 2016 Summer Olympics
- 2017 Eurobasket
- 7th 2021 Eurobasket
- 6th 2020 Summer Olympics
- 2023 Eurobasket
