= CCC Polkowice =

CCC Polkowice refers to two different sporting teams based in Poland:

- CCC Polkowice (basketball team), a women's basketball team, based in Polkowice
- CCC Polkowice (cycling team), a men's cycling team, based in Poland
