= 2019 EuroLeague Women Final Four =

Basketball tournament in Sopron

- Season: 2018–19 EuroLeague Women

Tournament details
- Arena: Aréna Sopron; Sopron, Hungary
- Dates: 12–14 April 2019

Final positions
- Champions: (Russian Basketball Federation) UMMC Ekaterinburg (5th title)
- Runners-up: (Russian Basketball Federation) Dynamo Kursk
- Third place: (Czech Basketball Federation) ZVVZ USK Praha
- Fourth place: (Hungarian Basketball Federation) Sopron Basket

Awards and statistics
- MVP: (United States) Brittney Griner

The 2019 EuroLeague Women Final Four was the concluding round of the tournament of the 2018–19 EuroLeague Women season, the 61st season of Europe's premier club basketball tournament, and the 23rd edition since being rebranded as the EuroLeague Women. On 20 March 2019, it was announced by FIBA Europe that the Final Four would be played at the Aréna Sopron in Sopron, Hungary, on 12–14 April 2019.

== Venue ==
On 20 March 2019, it was announced by FIBA Europe that the Final Four would be played at the Aréna Sopron in Sopron, Hungary, on 12–14 April 2019.

Sopron	2019 EuroLeague Women Final Four (Europe)
Aréna Sopron	2019 EuroLeague Women Final Four (Europe)
Capacity: 2,500	2019 EuroLeague Women Final Four (Europe)

== Teams ==
Team	Qualified date	Participations (Note: Including Final Four and Final Eights tournaments.) (bold indicates winners)
(Russia) UMMC Ekaterinburg	8 March 2019	12 (**2002–03**, 2007–08, 2008–09, 2009–10, 2010–11, 2011–12, **2012–13**, 2013–14, 2014–15, **2015–16**, 2016–17, **2017–18**)
(Czech Republic) ZVVZ USK Praha	8 March 2019	4 (2013–14, **2014–15**, 2015–16, 2016–17)
(Russia) Dynamo Kursk	8 March 2019	3 (2014–15, **2016–17**, 2017–18)
(Hungary) Sopron Basket	9 March 2019	2 (2008–09, 2017–18)

== Bracket ==
Semifinals
12 April
**(Russia) UMMC Ekaterinburg**	**81**
(Hungary) Sopron Basket	59
12 April
(Czech Republic) ZVVZ USK Praha	67
**(Russia) Dynamo Kursk**	**84**

Final
14 April
**(Russia) UMMC Ekaterinburg**	**91**
(Russia) Dynamo Kursk	67
Third place
14 April
(Hungary) Sopron Basket	53
**(Czech Republic) ZVVZ USK Praha**	**64**

== Semifinals ==
12 April 2019	ZVVZ USK Praha (Czech Republic)	67–**84**	(Russia) **Dynamo Kursk**	Sopron
17:00 (UTC+2)	Scoring by quarter: 17–**19**, 21–**24**, 9–**24**, **20**–17
	Pts: Ayayi 18; Rebs: three players 9 Asts: Ayayi, Elhotová 3	Boxscore	Pts: Stewart 32; Rebs: Howard 10; Asts: three players 3	Arena: Aréna Sopron; Referees: Jasmina Juras (SRB), Boris Krejič (SLO), Vasiliki Tsaroucha (GRE)

12 April 2019	**UMMC Ekaterinburg** (Russia)	**81**–59	(Hungary) Sopron Basket	Sopron
20:00 (UTC+2)	Scoring by quarter: 17–**24**, **25**–15, **18**–7, **21**–13
	Pts: Griner 19; Rebs: Griner, Vandersloot 8 Asts: Vandersloot 5	Boxscore	Pts: Turner 15; Rebs: Zahui 8 Asts: Casas 3	Arena: Aréna Sopron; Referees: Gentian Cici (ALB), Özlem Yalman (TUR), Dariusz Zapolski (POL)

== Third place game ==
14 April 2019	Sopron Basket (Hungary)	53–**64**	(Czech Republic) **ZVVZ USK Praha**	Sopron
17:30 (UTC+2)	Scoring by quarter: 15–**16**, 16–**22**, **15**–10, 7–**16**
	Pts: Crvendakić, Turner 12; Rebs: Crvendakić 8 Asts: Turner 5	Boxscore	Pts: Ayayi 14; Rebs: Thomas 15; Asts: Ayayi 5	Arena: Aréna Sopron; Referees: Jasmina Juras (SRB), Gentian Cici (ALB), Andrada Csender (ROU)

== Final ==
14 April 2019	**UMMC Ekaterinburg** (Russia)	**91**–67	(Russia) Dynamo Kursk	Sopron
20:30 (UTC+2)	Scoring by quarter: **21**–17, **27**–16, **24**–16, 19–19
	Pts: Vandersloot 18; Rebs: Griner 10; Asts: Vandersloot 7	Boxscore	Pts: Howard 20; Rebs: Howard 5 Asts: Prince 5	Arena: Aréna Sopron; Attendance: 2,800; Referees: Özlem Yalman (TUR), Boris Krejič (SLO), Vasiliki Tsaroucha (GRE)

Starters:			Pts	Reb	Ast
PG	22	(Belgium) Courtney Vandersloot	18	8	7
SG	0	(United States) Kayla McBride	12	2	3
SF	7	(Spain) Alba Torrens	11	6	3
PF	33	(Belgium) Emma Meesseman	13	1	2
C	42	(United States) Brittney Griner	16	10	0
Reserves:					
SG	3	(Russia) Elizaveta Komarova	0	0	0
F	5	(Russia) Evgeniya Belyakova	2	3	1
PG	9	(Slovenia) Nika Barič	3	1	2
PG	13	(Russia) Elena Beglova	0	0	0
C	15	(Russia) Natalia Vieru	0	0	1
PF	44	(Russia) Raisa Musina	2	1	0
C	77	(Russia) Maria Vadeeva	14	5	0
Head coach:
(Spanish Basketball Federation) Miguel Méndez

**Ekaterinburg**	**Dynamo**

Ekaterinburg	Statistics	Dynamo
31/49 (63.3%)	2-point field goals	17/46(37%)
6/12 (50%)	3-point field goals	7/25 (28%)
11/15 (73.3%)	Free throws	12/19 (63.2%)
6	Offensive rebounds	15
33	Defensive rebounds	19
39	Total rebounds	34
19	Assists	16
8	Steals	7
15	Turnovers	13
5	Blocks	1
15	Fouls	10

2018–19 EuroLeague Women champions

**UMMC Ekaterinburg**
(5th title)

Starters:			Pts	Reb	Ast
PG	15	(Spain) Anna Cruz	5	4	2
SG	10	(Russia) Epiphanny Prince	8	2	5
SF	5	(Serbia) Sonja Vasić	9	1	2
PF	32	(United States) Natasha Howard	20	5	1
C	30	(United States) Breanna Stewart	12	4	2
Reserves:					
SG	1	(Spain) Marta Xargay	3	0	0
SG	3	(Russia) Natalya Zhedik	1	3	3
PF	12	(Russia) Tatiana Vidmer	4	4	1
SG	13	(Russia) Elena Kirillova	3	1	0
C	24	(Turkey) Quanitra Hollingsworth	2	2	0
G	31	(Russia) Ekaterina Golovchenko	0	0	0
C	33	(Russia) Natalia Anoikina	DNP		
Head coach:
(Spanish Basketball Federation) Lucas Mondelo
