= Maja Erkić =

Slovenian basketball player

No. 5 – Atomerőmű SE
- Position: Small forward
- League: NB 1/A

Personal information
- Born: 13 May 1985 (age 41) Slovenj Gradec, SFR Yugoslavia
- Listed height: 6 ft 0 in (1.83 m)

Career information
- WNBA draft: 2007: undrafted
- Playing career: 2004–present

Career history
- 2004–2006: Merkur Celje
- 2006–2008: Celta de Vigo
- 2008–2010: Atlético Faenza
- 2010–2012: Famila Schio
- 2012–2014: Rivas Ecópolis
- 2014–2015: Athlete Celje
- 2015–2016: Passalacqua Ragusa
- 2016–present: Atomerőmű SE

Maja Erkić (born 13 May 1985) is a Slovenian basketball player. She currently playing in the First League of Hungary for Atomerőmű SE. She is a member of the Slovenian national team.
