= Maite Cazorla =

Spanish basketball player (born 1997)

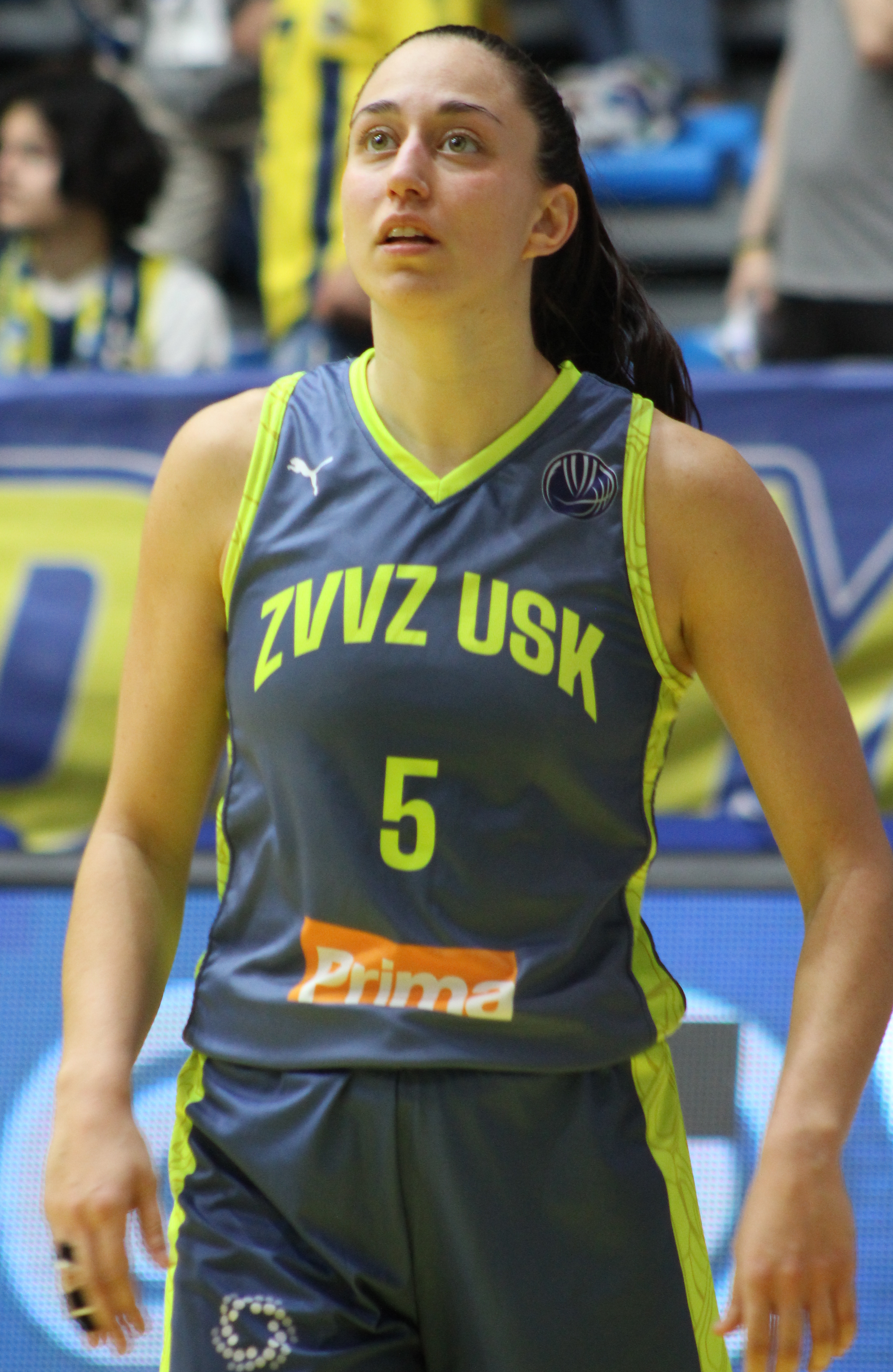

No. 5 – ZVVZ USK Praha
- Position: Guard
- League: Czech Women's Basketball League

Personal information
- Born: 18 June 1997 (age 29) Las Palmas, Spain
- Listed height: 5 ft 10 in (1.78 m)
- Listed weight: 155 lb (70 kg)

Career information
- High school: Segle XXI (Barcelona, Spain)
- College: Oregon (2015–2019)
- WNBA draft: 2019: 2nd round, 23rd overall pick
- Drafted by: Atlanta Dream
- Playing career: 2011–present

Career history
- 2011–2015: Segle XXI (youth/LF2)
- 2019: Atlanta Dream
- 2019–2023: Perfumerías Avenida
- 2023–present: ZVVZ USK Praha

Career highlights
- EuroLeague Women champion (2025); Spanish League champion (2021); Spanish Cup champion (2020); 2x All Pac-12 (2018, 2019)
- Stats at WNBA.com
- Stats at Basketball Reference

María Teresa Cazorla Medina (born 18 June 1997), known as Maite Cazorla, is a Spanish professional basketball player for the ZVVZ USK Praha of the Czech Women's Basketball League and the Spanish women's national basketball team. She was drafted with the twenty third overall pick in the 2019 WNBA draft.

== Youth career ==
Coming from a family of professional basketball players that included her elder brother Carlos, Cazorla started playing basketball at 14 with her school team Teresianas before joining the youth system of CB Islas Canarias. At the age of 14 she left the Canary Islands and moved Barcelona to continue her development in the youth teams of Segle XXI in 2011.

She progressed in the club, playing in the Spanish second-tier league and the Spanish national youth teams until her performance in the 2014 FIBA Under-17 World Championship for Women caught the eye of the Oregon Ducks scouts.

== College career ==
Cazorla attended the University of Oregon from 2015 to 2019. She played all four years, and was named to the Pac-12 All-Freshman team in 2015. She was named to the All-Pac-12 team in her Junior and Senior years. In 2019, she played with the team that made it to the Final Four. In total, Cazorla played in 146 games for the Ducks over her four-year career. Cazorla was the eighth player from Oregon selected in the WNBA Draft.

=== Oregon statistics ===
Legend
GP	Games played	GS	Games started	MPG	Minutes per game
FG%	Field goal percentage	3P%	3-point field goal percentage	FT%	Free throw percentage
RPG	Rebounds per game	APG	Assists per game	SPG	Steals per game
BPG	Blocks per game	PPG	Points per game	**Bold**	Career high

Year	Team	GP	Points	FG%	3P%	FT%	RPG	APG	SPG	BPG	PPG
2015-16	Oregon	35	410	44.8%	39.4%	73.8%	**2.5**	**5.9**	**1.9**	0.1	**11.7**
2016-17	Oregon	36	291	39.9%	34.9%	82.1%	1.4	3.9	1.3	0.1	8.1
2017-18	Oregon	37	**403**	48.6%	38.9%	**83.3%**	2.4	4.8	1.4	**0.2**	10.9
2018-19	Oregon	**38**	370	**49.6%**	**41.2%**	81.1%	1.4	4.3	1.1	0.2	9.7
Career		146	1474	45.7%	38.9%	79.0%	1.9	4.7	1.4	0.1	10.1

== WNBA career ==
Cazorla made her WNBA debut on 31 May 2019, in a game versus the Seattle Storm. She totaled 3 points in her 5 minutes in the game.

== WNBA career statistics ==
Legend
GP	Games played	GS	Games started	MPG	Minutes per game	RPG	Rebounds per game
APG	Assists per game	SPG	Steals per game	BPG	Blocks per game	PPG	Points per game
TO	Turnovers per game	FG%	Field-goal percentage	3P%	3-point field-goal percentage	FT%	Free-throw percentage
**Bold**	Career best	°	League leader

=== Regular season ===
Year	Team	GP	GS	MPG	FG%	3P%	FT%	RPG	APG	SPG	BPG	TO	PPG
2019	Atlanta	31	1	15.4	.312	.236	.875	0.7	1.6	0.6	0.0	0.9	3.0
Career	1 year, 1 team	31	1	15.4	.312	.236	.875	0.7	1.6	0.6	0.0	0.9	3.0

== Club career ==
Back in Spain, in June 2019, she signed for CB Avenida, one of the top teams of the Spanish top-tier league, winning her first title in 2020, the Spanish Queen's Cup and participating in the 2019-20 EuroCup Women. After the 2022-2023 season, she moved to ZVVZ USK Praha, where she helped win a Euroleague Women title in 2025.

=== European Cups/League statistics ===
Cazorla has played in seven seasons in European league play, as well as in the Spanish league. Her best year was in the 2023-2024 EuroLeague Women season, where she registered 8.9 points, 2.2 rebounds and 5.4 assists per game.

Statistics through November 19,2025

Season	Team	GP	PPG	RPG	APG
2019–2020 EuroCup	Perfumerías Avenida	10	4.4	0.6	2.4
2020–2021 EuroLeague	Perfumerías Avenida	10	7.3	1.7	3.0
2021-2022 EuroLeague	Pefumerias Avienda	19	7.5	1.9	3.5
2022-2023 EuroLeague	Perfumeria Avienda	17	9.2	1.4	4.1
2023-2024 Euroleague	ZVVZ USK Praha	17	8.9	2.2	5.4
2024-2025 Euroleague	ZVVZ USK Praha	12	6.8	2.1	4.6
2025-2026 Euroleague	ZVVZ USK Praha	0	0.0	0.0	0.0

== National team ==
Cazorla started playing with Spain's youth teams at 14, winning a total of seven medals from 2012 to 2017. Her highlights on these teams include a European U16 title in 2013, a runner-up finish at the U17 FIBA World Championships in 2014, and a third-place finish at the U19 FIBA World Championships in 2015. She made her debut with the senior team in 2019, when she was 22 years old. Up to 2021, she had 19 caps and participated in the 2020 Olympics and the 2021 EuroBasket.

- 2012 FIBA Europe Under-16 Championship (youth)
- 2013 FIBA Europe Under-16 Championship (youth)
- 2014 FIBA Under-17 World Championship (youth)
- 2014 FIBA Europe Under-18 Championship (youth)
- 4th 2015 FIBA Under-19 World Championship (youth)
- 2015 FIBA Europe Under-18 Championship (youth)
- 2016 FIBA Europe Under-20 Championship (youth)
- 2017 FIBA Europe Under-20 Championship (youth)
- 7th 2021 Eurobasket
- 6th 2020 Summer Olympics
- 2023 Eurobasket
