= CCC Polkowice (basketball team) =

Polish women's basketball club

KGHM BC Polkowice
- League: Orlen Basket Liga Kobiet
- Founded: 1983
- Folded: 2025
- Arena: Hala Sportowa - Polkowice
- Location: Polkowice, Poland
- Team colors: Orange and Black
- Championships: 5 Polish Championships

KGHM BC Polkowice was a Polish professional women's basketball club. Founded in 1983 in the city of Polkowice, it was withdrawn from senior competitions in June 2025 and subsequently disbanded.

== Honours ==
- Polish Championship:
  - Champions: 2013, 2018, 2019, 2022, 2024
  - Runners-up: 2011, 2012, 2014, 2021, 2023
  - Third place: 2005, 2007, 2015, 2017
- Polish Cup:
  - Winners: 2004, 2013, 2019, 2022, 2023, 2024

== Notable players ==
- (United States) (Israel) Alysha Clark
