= 2011–12 EuroLeague Women =

- League: EuroLeague Women
- Sport: Basketball

Regular Season

Final
- Champions: (Spain) Ros Casares Valencia
- Runners-up: (Spain) Rivas Ecópolis

EuroLeague Women seasons
- ← 2010–11 2012–13 →

The 2011–12 season is the 16th edition of Europe's premier basketball tournament for women - EuroLeague Women since it was rebranded to its current format.

== Regular season ==
Regular season groups started on 12 October 2011 and finished on 1 February 2012.

=== Group A ===
	Team	Pld	W	L	PF	PA	Diff	Pts
1.	(Spain) Ros Casares	14	12	2	1089	865	+224	26
2.	(Turkey) Galatasaray Medical Park	14	11	3	1133	1011	+122	25
3.	(Russia) UMMC Ekaterinburg	14	10	4	1070	885	+185	24
4.	(Czech Republic) ZVVZ USK Praha	14	8	6	1037	993	+44	22
5.	(France) Bourges Basket	14	7	7	949	928	+21	21
6.	(Hungary) Uni Seat Győr	14	3	11	921	1143	−222	17
7.	(Poland) Lotos Gdynia	14	3	11	987	1121	−134	17
8.	(Lithuania) Vici Aistes Kaunas	14	2	12	892	1132	−240	16

=== Group B ===
	Team	Pld	W	L	PF	PA	Diff	Pts
1.	(Turkey) Fenerbahçe	12	12	0	967	778	+189	24
2.	(Spain) Perfumerías Avenida	12	8	4	907	822	+85	20
3.	(Russia) Nadezhda	12	7	5	822	814	+8	19
4.	(Italy) Beretta Famila	12	6	6	813	824	−11	18
5.	(Poland) CCC Polkowice	12	5	7	864	892	−28	17
6.	(Hungary) UNIQA Euroleasing Sopron	12	4	8	769	842	−73	16
7.	(France) Tarbes GB	12	0	12	774	944	−170	12

=== Group C ===
	Team	Pld	W	L	PF	PA	Diff	Pts
1.	(Russia) Sparta&K M. R.	14	11	3	1069	950	+119	25
2.	(Poland) Wisła Can-Pack	14	10	4	963	903	+60	24
3.	(Slovakia) Good Angels Košice	14	9	5	994	893	+101	23
4.	(Spain) Rivas Ecópolis	14	8	6	1024	949	+75	22
5.	(France) BLMA	14	6	8	1028	988	+40	20
6.	(Italy) Cras Basket Taranto	14	6	8	949	991	−42	20
7.	Gospić Croatia Osiguranje	14	5	9	1017	1091	−74	19
8.	(Czech Republic) Frisco Brno	14	1	13	852	1131	−279	15

== Round 2 ==
Game 1 was played on 21 February 2012. Game 2 was played on 24 February 2012. Game 3 was played on 29 February 2012. The first team to win two games advanced to the quarterfinals. Galatasaray Medical Park qualified directly to the quarterfinals as host of the Final Eight.

Team #1	Agg.	Team #2	1st leg	2nd leg	3rd leg^{*}
Fenerbahçe (Turkey)	2 – 0	(France) BLMA	83 – 71	80 – 72	-
Ros Casares (Spain)	2 – 0	(Poland) CCC Polkowice	88 – 54	78 – 58	-
Wisła Can-Pack (Poland)	2 – 0	(Czech Republic) ZVVZ USK Praha	66 – 52	74 – 60	-
Rivas Ecópolis (Spain)	2 – 1	(France) Bourges Basket	66 – 59	60 – 68	64 – 56
Sparta&K M. R. (Russia)	2 – 1	(Russia) Nadezhda	93 – 79	75 – 87	82 – 67
Perfumerías Avenida (Spain)	0 – 2	(Italy) Beretta Famila	59 – 67	72 – 82	-
UMMC Ekaterinburg (Russia)	2 – 0	(Slovakia) Good Angels Košice	61 – 55	75 – 49	-

== Final eight ==
=== Semifinal round ===
Final Eight was held in Istanbul. The semifinal round was played in a round robin system with two groups of four teams. The two group winners played the final game.

==== Group A ====
	Team	Pld	W	L	PF	PA	Diff	Pts
1.	(Spain) Rivas Ecópolis (Q)	3	3	0	214	196	+18	6
2.	(Turkey) Fenerbahçe	3	2	1	219	199	+20	5
3.	(Turkey) Galatasaray Medical Park	3	1	2	215	221	–6	4
4.	(Italy) Beretta Famila	3	0	3	187	219	–32	3

28 March 2012
18:00

Report

Fenerbahçe (Turkey)	74–58	(Italy) Beretta Famila
Scoring by quarter: 22–17, 20–13, 14–18, 18–10
Pts: Matović 25; Rebs: Tamane 10; Asts: Vardarlı 5		Pts: Erkič 16; Rebs: Ford 12; Asts: Cohen 8

Abdi İpekçi Arena, Istanbul
Attendance: 3,000
Referees: Juris Kokainis (LAT), Haydn Jones (WAL), Carole Delauné (FRA)

28 March 2012
20:45

Report

Rivas Ecópolis (Spain)	75–68	(Turkey) Galatasaray Medical Park
Scoring by quarter: 12–17, 21–19, 19–16, 23–16
Pts: Jones 19; Rebs: Jones 13; Asts: Cruz 5		Pts: Taurasi, Charles 21; Rebs: Charles 10; Asts: Prince 8

Abdi İpekçi Arena, Istanbul
Attendance: 3,000
Referees: Ademir Zurapović (BIH), Benjamin Barth (GER), Ognjen Jokić (MNE)

29 March 2012
18:00

Report

Beretta Famila (Italy)	58–65	(Spain) Rivas Ecópolis
Scoring by quarter: 7–17, 20–13, 16–15, 15–20
Pts: Ford 11; Rebs: Ford 20; Asts: Cohen 4		Pts: Jones 28; Rebs: Jones 12; Asts: Aguilar 4

Abdi İpekçi Arena, Istanbul
Attendance: 3,000
Referees: Petros Papapetrou (GRE), Sérgio Silva (POR), Mathieu Bayot (BEL)

29 March 2012
20:45

Report

Galatasaray Medical Park (Turkey)	67–75	(Turkey) Fenerbahçe
Scoring by quarter: 26–18, 19–18, 12–23, 10–16
Pts: Taurasi 20; Rebs: Charles 12; Asts: Prince 5		Pts: Tamane 19; Rebs: Tamane 9 Asts: Yılmaz 5

Abdi İpekçi Arena, Istanbul
Attendance: 8,574
Referees: Aleksandar Glišić (SRB), Andris Aunkrogers (LAT), Fabiana Nitu (ROU)

30 March 2012
18:00

Report

Fenerbahçe (Turkey)	70–74	(Spain) Rivas Ecópolis
Scoring by quarter: 15–22, 22–20, 9–16, 24–16
Pts: McCoughtry 21; Rebs: McCoughtry 9 Asts: Vardarlı 6		Pts: Jones 20; Rebs: Jones 11; Asts: Cruz 4

Abdi İpekçi Arena, Istanbul
Attendance: 3,000
Referees: Ademir Zurapović (BIH), Andris Aunkrogers (LAT), Haydn Jones (WAL)

30 March 2012
20:45

Report

Galatasaray Medical Park (Turkey)	80–71	(Italy) Beretta Famila
Scoring by quarter: 26–14, 18–18, 18–19, 18–20
Pts: Taurasi, Çağlar 17; Rebs: Matić 8 Asts: Alben 8		Pts: three players 11; Rebs: Ford 6 Asts: Cohen, McCarville 4

Abdi İpekçi Arena, Istanbul
Attendance: 2,000
Referees: Benjamin Barth (GER), Juris Kokainis (LAT), Gentian Cici (ALB)

==== Group B ====
	Team	Pld	W	L	PF	PA	Diff	Pts
1.	(Spain) Ros Casares (Q)	3	3	0	229	176	+53	6
2.	(Russia) UMMC Ekaterinburg	3	2	1	202	201	+1	5
3.	(Russia) Sparta&K M. R.	3	1	2	223	233	−10	4
4.	(Poland) Wisła Can-Pack	3	0	3	190	234	−44	3

28 March 2012
13:00

Report

Wisła Can-Pack (Poland)	70–77	(Russia) Sparta&K M. R.
Scoring by quarter: 20–10, 15–19, 16–23, 19–25
Pts: Kobryn 19; Rebs: Powell 8 Asts: De Mondt 4		Pts: Hammon 16; Rebs: Dupree 9 Asts: Škerović 5

Abdi İpekçi Arena, Istanbul
Attendance: 100
Referees: Petros Papapetrou (GRE), Gentian Cici (ALB), Fabiana Nitu (ROU)

28 March 2012
15:30

Report

Ros Casares (Spain)	62–49	(Russia) UMMC Ekaterinburg
Scoring by quarter: 13–8, 20–12, 18–11, 11–18
Pts: Jackson 12; Rebs: Lyttle 9 Asts: Moore 4		Pts: Parker 17; Rebs: Parker 8 Asts: Horáková, Nolan 2

Abdi İpekçi Arena, Istanbul
Attendance: 800
Referees: Aleksandar Glišić (SRB), Sérgio Silva (POR), Andris Aunkrogers (LAT)

29 March 2012
13:00

Report

Sparta&K M. R. (Russia)	66–77	(Spain) Ros Casares
Scoring by quarter: 18–11, 21–22, 16–18, 11–26
Pts: Hammon 16; Rebs: Augustus, Petrović 7 Asts: Skerović, Augustus 4		Pts: Jackson 16; Rebs: Moore 9 Asts: Palau 5

Abdi İpekçi Arena, Istanbul
Attendance: 1,000
Referees: Ademir Zurapović (BIH), Haydn Jones (WAL), Benjamin Barth (GER)

29 March 2012
15:30

Report

UMMC Ekaterinburg (Russia)	67–59	(Poland) Wisła Can-Pack
Scoring by quarter: 21–16, 14–14, 16–15, 16–14
Pts: Nolan 19; Rebs: Parker 7 Asts: Bird 7		Pts: Powell 23; Rebs: Powell 8 Asts: three players 2

Abdi İpekçi Arena, Istanbul
Attendance: 2,000
Referees: Juris Kokainis (LAT), Ognjen Jokić (MNE), Carole Delauné (FRA)

30 March 2012
13:00

Report

Ros Casares (Spain)	90–61	(Poland) Wisła Can-Pack
Scoring by quarter: 27–14, 24–10, 18–16, 21–21
Pts: Yacoubou 20; Rebs: Moore 12; Asts: Palau 7		Pts: De Mondt, Powell 12; Rebs: Powell 8 Asts: Pawlak, Phillips 3

Abdi İpekçi Arena, Istanbul
Attendance: 1,000
Referees: Aleksandar Glišić (SRB), Sérgio Silva (POR), Fabiana Nitu (ROU)

30 March 2012
15:30

Report

Sparta&K M. R. (Russia)	80–86	(Russia) UMMC Ekaterinburg
Scoring by quarter: 22–25, 15–15, 16–23, 27–23
Pts: Augustus 19; Rebs: Dupree 6 Asts: Barič 4		Pts: Gruda 21; Rebs: Gruda 9 Asts: Linkevičienė, Nolan 5

Abdi İpekçi Arena, Istanbul
Attendance: 2,500
Referees: Petros Papapetrou (GRE), Ognjen Jokić (MNE), Mathieu Bayot (BEL)

=== Classification 7–8 ===
1 April 2012
13:00

Report

Beretta Famila (Italy)	65–62	(Poland) Wisła Can-Pack
Scoring by quarter: 16- 10, 22-10, 10-15, 17-17
Pts: Erkic 15; Rebs: Ford 13; Asts: Erkic 4		Pts: Phillips 15; Rebs: Kobryn 6 Asts: Phillips 8

Abdi İpekçi Arena, Istanbul
Attendance: 250
Referees: Sérgio Silva (POR), Juris Kokainis (LAT), Carole Delauné (FRA)

=== Classification 5–6 ===
1 April 2012
15:30

Report

Galatasaray Medical Park (Turkey)	73–71	(Russia) Sparta&K M. R.
Scoring by quarter: 25-13, 16-22, 13-21, 19-15
Pts: Taurasi 25; Rebs: Taurasi, Alben 6 Asts: Penicheiro 4		Pts: Augustus 15; Rebs: four players 5 Asts: Augustus 3

Abdi İpekçi Arena, Istanbul
Attendance: 1,200
Referees: Aleksandar Glišić (SRB), Gentian Cici (ALB), Mathieu Bayot (BEL)

=== Classification 3–4 ===
1 April 2012
18:00

Report

Fenerbahçe (Turkey)	68–75	(Russia) UMMC Ekaterinburg
Scoring by quarter: 20-27, 14-15, 18-11, 16-22
Pts: McCoughtry 20; Rebs: Yilmaz 12; Asts: Vardarli 4		Pts: Gruda 18; Rebs: Parker 11; Asts: Parker 5

Abdi İpekçi Arena, Istanbul
Attendance: 2,000
Referees: Ademir Zurapovic (BIH), Ognjen Jokic (MNE), Haydn Jones (WAL)

=== Final ===
1 April 2012
20:45

Report

Rivas Ecópolis (Spain)	52–65	(Spain) Ros Casares
Scoring by quarter: 18-20, 19-13, 11-18, 4-14
Pts: Jones 14; Rebs: Jones 7 Asts: Nicholls 2		Pts: Lyttle 18; Rebs: three players 6 Asts: four players 2

Abdi İpekçi Arena, Istanbul
Attendance: 2,500
Referees: Petros Papapetrou (GRE), Andris Aunkrogers (LAT), Fabiana Nitu (ROU)

Euroleague Women 2012 Champions

Ros Casares
First title
