= 2012–13 EuroLeague Women =

- League: EuroLeague Women
- Sport: Basketball

Regular Season

Final
- Champions: (Russia) UMMC Ekaterinburg
- Runners-up: (Turkey) Fenerbahçe

EuroLeague Women seasons
- ← 2011–12 2013–14 →

The 2012–13 season is the 17th edition of Europe's premier basketball tournament for women – EuroLeague Women since it was rebranded to its current format.

== Regular season ==
Regular season groups started on 24 October 2012 and finished on 6 February 2013.

=== Group A ===
	Team	Pld	W	L	PF	PA	Diff	Pts
1.	(Russia) Sparta&K M. R. Vidnoje	12	10	2	974	799	+175	22
2.	(France) Bourges Basket	12	9	3	787	743	+44	21
3.	(Poland) TS Wisła Can-Pack Kraków	12	6	6	818	825	−7	18
4.	(Spain) Rivas Ecópolis	12	6	6	813	766	+47	18
5.	(Hungary) Uni Győr	12	5	7	801	890	−89	17
6.	(Turkey) Tarsus Belediyespor	12	4	8	863	892	−29	16
7.	(Czech Republic) BK Brno	12	2	10	765	906	−141	14

=== Group B ===
	Team	Pld	W	L	PF	PA	Diff	Pts
1.	(Slovakia) Good Angels Košice	12	9	3	919	840	+79	21
2.	(Turkey) Fenerbahçe Istanbul	12	9	3	946	813	+133	21
3.	(Russia) Nadezhda Orenburg	12	8	4	861	857	+4	20
4.	(Italy) Famila Schio	12	7	5	839	823	+16	19
5.	(Romania) CSM Târgovişte	12	4	8	824	886	−62	16
6.	(Hungary) UNIQA Euroleasing Sopron	12	3	9	827	862	−35	15
7.	(France) Arras Pays d'Artois	12	2	10	750	885	−135	14

=== Group C ===
	Team	Pld	W	L	PF	PA	Diff	Pts
1.	(Russia) UMMC Ekaterinburg	12	11	1	951	772	+179	23
2.	(Turkey) Galatasaray Istanbul	12	9	3	771	675	+96	21
3.	(Poland) CCC Polkowice	12	6	6	806	773	+33	18
4.	(Spain) Perfumerias Avenida	12	5	7	820	846	−26	17
5.	(Czech Republic) ZVVZ USK Praha	12	5	7	802	839	−37	17
6.	(France) USO Mondeville Basket	12	5	7	757	853	−96	17
7.	(Croatia) Novi Zagreb	12	1	11	826	975	−149	13

== Round 2 ==
Game 1 will be played on 19 February 2013. Game 2 will be played on 22 February 2013. Game 3 will be played on 27 February 2013. The team that won two games first, advanced to the quarterfinals. UMMC Ekaterinburg qualified directly to the quarterfinals as hoster of the Final Eight.

Team #1	Agg.	Team #2	1st leg	2nd leg	3rd leg^{*}
Sparta&K M. R. Vidnoje (Russia)	2 – 0	(Romania) CSM Târgovişte	91 – 84	68 – 63	–
Fenerbahçe Istanbul (Turkey)	2 – 0	(Hungary) Uni Győr	93 – 61	77 – 68	–
Galatasaray Istanbul (Turkey)	2 – 0	(Czech Republic) ZVVZ USK Praha	49 – 48	78 – 63	–
Good Angels Košice (Slovakia)	2 – 0	(Spain) Perfumerias Avenida	82 – 68	74 – 64	–
Bourges Basket (France)	2 – 1	(Poland) TS Wisła Can-Pack Kraków	54 – 57	50 – 38	66 – 59
Nadezhda Orenburg (Russia)	0 – 2	(Poland) CCC Polkowice	71 – 74	70 – 76	–
Famila Schio (Italy)	2 – 1	(Spain) Rivas Ecópolis	69 – 63	47 – 75	79 – 75

== Final eight ==
=== Quarter-final round ===
The Final Eight will be held in Yekaterinburg. The Quarter-Final Round will be played in a round robin system with two groups of four teams. The two group winners will advance to the Semi-Final Round.

==== Group A ====
	Team	Pld	W	L	PF	PA	Diff	Pts
1.	(Russia) UMMC Ekaterinburg	3	3	0	212	130	+82	6
2.	(Slovakia) Good Angels Košice	3	2	1	178	191	−13	5
3.	(Poland) CCC Polkowice	3	1	2	157	185	−28	4
4.	(Turkey) Galatasaray Istanbul	3	0	3	160	201	−41	3

==== Group B ====
	Team	Pld	W	L	PF	PA	Diff	Pts
1.	(Turkey) Fenerbahçe Istanbul	3	3	0	228	173	+55	6
2.	(France) Bourges Basket	3	2	1	175	189	−14	5
3.	(Russia) Sparta&K M. R. Vidnoje	3	1	2	225	220	+5	4
4.	(Italy) Famila Schio	3	0	3	194	234	−40	3

=== Semi-final round ===
DIVS Sport Hall, Yekaterinburg, Russia

Semifinals; 22 March
(Russia) UMMC Ekaterinburg	73
(France) Bourges Basket	44
(Turkey) Fenerbahçe Istanbul	68
(Slovakia) Good Angels Košice	56

Final; 24 March
(Russia) UMMC Ekaterinburg	82
(Turkey) Fenerbahçe Istanbul	56
Third place
(France) Bourges Basket	65
(Slovakia) Good Angels Košice	57

==== Semifinal 1 ====
22 March 2013
19:00 UTC+6

Report

UMMC Ekaterinburg (Russia)	73–44	(France) Bourges Basket
Scoring by quarter: 16–18, 18–7, 22–8, 17–11
Pts: Candace Parker (24); Rebs: Candace Parker (14); Asts: Diana Taurasi (5)		Pts: Marissa Coleman (13); Rebs: Johannah Leedham (10); Asts: Céline Dumerc (3)

DIVS Sport Hall, Yekaterinburg
Attendance: 6000
Referees: Piotr Pastusiak (POL), Fabiana Nitu (ROU), Nick Van den Broeck (BEL)

==== Semifinal 2 ====
22 March 2013
21:30 UTC+6

Report

Fenerbahçe Istanbul (Turkey)	68–56	(Slovakia) Good Angels Košice
Scoring by quarter: 14–15, 14–20, 23–10, 17–11
Pts: Cappie Pondexter (19); Rebs: Angel McCoughtry (14); Asts: Birsel Vardarlı (6)		Pts: Plenette Pierson (23); Rebs: Petra Kulichová (13); Asts: Miljana Bojović (6)

DIVS Sport Hall, Yekaterinburg
Attendance: 2000
Referees: Carlos Cortes (ESP), Erez Gurion (ISR), Nikolaos Somos (GRE)

=== Third-place ===
24 March 2013
16:30 UTC+6

Report

Bourges Basket (France)	65–57	(Slovakia) Good Angels Košice
Scoring by quarter: 7–19, 19–8, 16–13, 23–17
Pts: Céline Dumerc (24); Rebs: Nwal-Endene Miyem (10); Asts: Céline Dumerc (3)		Pts: Allie Quigley (18); Rebs: Petra Kulichová (9); Asts: Miljana Bojović (5)

DIVS Sport Hall, Yekaterinburg
Attendance: 4805
Referees: Juris Kokainis (LAT), Fabiana Nitu (ROU), Petr Hrusa (CZE)

=== Final ===
24 March 2013
19:00 UTC+6

Report

UMMC Ekaterinburg (Russia)	82–56	(Turkey) Fenerbahçe Istanbul
Scoring by quarter: 26 – 11, 13–13, 27 – 20, 16 – 12
Pts: Candace Parker (24); Rebs: Candace Parker (11); Asts: Deanna Nolan (6)		Pts: Ivana Matović, Angel McCoughtry (22); Rebs: Angel McCoughtry (7); Asts: Cappie Pondexter (4)

DIVS Sport Hall, Yekaterinburg
Attendance: 5000
Referees: Boris Schmidt (GER), Uros Obrknezevic (SRB), Tomislav Hordov (CRO)

Euroleague 2013 Champions

UMMC Ekaterinburg
2nd title

== Stats leaders in regular season ==
=== Points ===
Rk	Name	Team	Games	Points	PPG
1	(United States) Tina Charles	(Poland) TS Wisła Can-Pack Kraków	13	312	24.0
2	(Serbia) Jelena Milovanović	(Hungary) UNIQA Euroleasing Sopron	12	229	19.1
3	(United States) Shenise Johnson	(Hungary) UNIQA Euroleasing Sopron	12	219	18.3
4	(United States) Nneka Ogwumike	(Poland) CCC Polkowice	14	248	17.7
5	(Romania) Gabriela Mărginean	(Romania) CSM Târgovişte	14	242	17.3

=== Rebounds ===
Rk	Name	Team	Games	Rebounds	PPG
1	(United States) Tina Charles	(Poland) TS Wisła Can-Pack Kraków	13	163	12.5
2	(United States) DeWanna Bonner	(Russia) Nadezhda Orenburg	13	136	10.5
3	(United States) Candace Parker	(Russia) UMMC Ekaterinburg	9	85	9.4
4	(Jamaica) Aneika Henry	(Spain) Rivas Ecópolis	15	128	8.5
5	(Turkey) Melisa Can	(Turkey) Tarsus Belediye Spor	12	101	8.4

=== Assists ===
Rk	Name	Team	Games	Assists	APG
1	(Spain) Laia Palau	(Poland) CCC Polkowice	14	94	6.7
2	(Montenegro) Jelena Škerović	(Czech Republic) ZVVZ USK Prague	14	87	6.2
3	(Serbia) Miljana Bojović	(Slovakia) Good Angels Košice	14	79	5.6
4	(United States) Diana Taurasi	(Russia) UMMC Ekaterinburg	12	60	5.0
5	(Spain) Silvia Domínguez	(Russia) UMMC Ekaterinburg	12	58	4.8
