= 2013–14 EuroLeague Women =

- League: EuroLeague Women
- Sport: Basketball

Regular Season

Final
- Champions: (Turkey) Galatasaray Odeabank
- Runners-up: (Turkey) Fenerbahçe
- Finals MVP: (Spain) Alba Torrens

EuroLeague Women seasons
- ← 2012–13 2014–15 →

The 2013–14 season is the 18th edition of Europe's premier basketball tournament for women – EuroLeague Women since it was rebranded to its current format.

== Pots ==
Defending champions UMMC Ekaterinburg, 2013 Runners-up Fenerbahçe and EuroLeague Women four-time winners Sparta&K M. R. Vidnoje have been given top seeds status. The teams are divided into two groups of 7 teams and one group of 6 teams.

Pot 1	Pot 2	Pot 3	Pot 4	Pot 5	Pot 6	Pot 7
(Russia) UMMC Ekaterinburg	(Spain) Perfumerías Avenida	(Slovakia) Good Angels Košice	(Russia) Nadezhda Orenburg	(Czech Republic) ZVVZ USK Praha	(Turkey) Kayseri Kaski Spor	(Lithuania) Kibirkstis-VICI
(Turkey) Fenerbahçe	(Spain) Rivas Ecópolis	(Turkey) Galatasaray Odeabank	(Poland) CCC Polkowice	(Hungary) UNI Győr	(Croatia) Novi Zagreb	(France) Lattes-Montpellier
(Russia) Spartak Moscow	(France) Bourges Basket	(Poland) TS Wisła Kraków	(Italy) Famila Schio	(Hungary) UE Sopron	(Czech Republic) BK Brno	

== Regular season ==
The draw took place on 5 July 2013 in Munich, Germany. The teams were divided in two groups of seven and one group of six teams. 14 teams will progress to contest the playoffs while the organiser of the Final Eight will qualify automatically to the season ending tournament.

=== Group A ===
	Team	Pld	W	L	PF	PA	Diff	Pts
1.	(Russia) UMMC Ekaterinburg	10	8	2	803	596	+207	18
2.	(France) Tango Bourges	10	6	4	682	598	+84	16
3.	(Turkey) Kayseri Kaski spor	10	6	4	669	637	+32	16
4.	(Slovakia) Good Angels Košice	10	5	5	640	671	−31	15
5.	(Italy) Beretta Famila	10	5	5	676	647	+29	15
6.	(Hungary) HAT-AGRO Uni Győr	10	0	10	522	843	−321	10

=== Group B ===
	Team	Pld	W	L	PF	PA	Diff	Pts
1.	(Turkey) Fenerbahçe	12	12	0	858	709	+149	24
2.	(Russia) Nadezhda Orenburg	12	7	5	831	741	+90	19
3.	(Poland) Wisła Can-Pack	12	7	5	808	754	+54	19
4.	(Hungary) UE Sopron	12	5	7	749	808	−59	17
5.	(Spain) Rivas Ecópolis	12	5	7	808	828	−20	17
6.	(France) Lattes Montpellier	12	3	9	717	793	−76	15
7.	(Czech Republic) BK IMOS Brno	12	3	9	756	894	−138	15

=== Group C ===
	Team	Pld	W	L	PF	PA	Diff	Pts
1.	(Czech Republic) ZVVZ USK Praha	12	10	2	859	716	+143	22
2.	(Russia) Sparta&K MR Vidnoje	12	9	3	797	701	+96	21
3.	(Turkey) Galatasaray Odeabank	12	8	4	830	692	+138	20
4.	(Spain) Perfumerías Avenida	12	6	6	800	800	0	18
5.	(Poland) CCC Polkowice	12	4	8	673	728	−55	16
6.	(Lithuania) Kibirkstis-Vici Vilnius	12	3	9	754	934	−180	15
7.	(Croatia) Novi Zagreb	12	2	10	728	870	−142	14

== Round 2 ==
Game 1 were played on 11 March 2014. Game 2 were played on 14 March 2014. Game 3 will be played on 19 March 2014. The team that won two games first, advanced to the quarterfinals. UMMC Ekaterinburg qualified directly to the quarterfinals as hoster of the Final Eight.

Team #1	Agg.	Team #2	1st leg	2nd leg	3rd leg^{*}
Fenerbahçe (Turkey)	2 – 0	(Poland) CCC Polkowice	75 – 57	64 – 48	–
ZVVZ USK Praha (Czech Republic)	2 – 1	(Spain) Rivas Ecópolis	77 – 58	57 – 62	54 – 38
Sparta&K MR Vidnoje (Russia)	2 – 0	(Hungary) UE Sopron	81 – 43	69 – 54	–
Galatasaray odeabank (Turkey)	2 – 0	(Spain) Perfumerías Avenida	70 – 61	75 – 54	–
Tango Bourges (France)	2 – 1	(Slovakia) Good Angels Košice	59 – 51	54 – 61	67 – 57
Nadezhda Orenburg (Russia)	2 – 0	(Poland) Wisła Can-Pack	52 – 48	83 – 76	–
Kayseri Kaski spor (Turkey)	2 – 1	(Italy) Beretta Famila	63 – 50	61 – 74	63 – 61

== Final eight ==
The Final Eight was held in Yekaterinburg.

=== Quarter-final round ===
The Quarter-Final Round was played in a round robin system with two groups of four teams. The two group winners advanced to the Semi-Final Round.

==== Group A ====
	Team	Pld	W	L	PF	PA	Diff	Pts
1.	(Turkey) Fenerbahçe	3	3	0	190	181	+9	6
2.	(Turkey) Galatasaray Odeabank	3	2	1	192	185	+7	5
3.	(Russia) Spartak Moscow	3	1	2	173	174	-1	4
4.	(Turkey) Kayseri Kaski Spor	3	0	3	162	177	-15	2

==== Group B ====
	Team	Pld	W	L	PF	PA	Diff	Pts
1.	(Russia) UMMC Ekaterinburg	3	3	0	233	146	+87	6
2.	(France) Bourges Basket	3	1	2	159	190	-31	4
3.	(Czech Republic) ZVVZ USK Praha	3	1	2	167	179	-12	4
4.	(Russia) Nadezhda Orenburg	3	1	2	156	200	-44	4

=== Semi-final round ===
Semifinals; 11 April
(Russia) UMMC Ekaterinburg	70
(Turkey) Galatasaray Odeabank	77
(Turkey) Fenerbahçe	59
(France) Bourges Basket	50

Final; 13 April
(Turkey) Galatasaray Odeabank	69
(Turkey) Fenerbahçe	58
Third place
(Russia) UMMC Ekaterinburg	80
(France) Bourges Basket	60

==== Semifinal 1 ====
11 April 2014
19:00 UTC+6

Report

UMMC Ekaterinburg	70–77	Galatasaray Odeabank
Scoring by quarter: 13-28, 16-22, 21-16, 20-11
Pts: Diana Taurasi (21); Rebs: C.Parker, Sandrine Gruda (8); Asts: Candace Parker (6)		Pts: Alba Torrens (29); Rebs: Kelsey Bone (9); Asts: Shavonte Zellous (8)

DIVS Sport Hall, Yekaterinburg
Attendance: 5000
Referees: Igor Mitrovski (MKD), Fabiana Martinescu (ROU), Gellert Kapitany (HUN)

==== Semifinal 2 ====
11 April 2014
21:30 UTC+6

Report

Fenerbahçe	59–50	Bourges Basket
Scoring by quarter: 13-6, 13-18, 13-14, 20-12
Pts: Angel McCoughtry (22); Rebs: Angel McCoughtry (10); Asts: Cappie Pondexter (5)		Pts: Nwal-Endene Miyem (12); Rebs: Céline Dumerc (13); Asts: C.Dumerc, Paoline Salagnac (3)

DIVS Sport Hall, Yekaterinburg
Attendance: 1000
Referees: Jasmina Juras (SRB), Anne Panther (GER), Torkild Rodsand (NOR)

=== Third-place ===
13 April 2014
16:30 UTC+6

Report

Bourges Basket	60–80	UMMC Ekaterinburg
Scoring by quarter: 18-20, 17-23, 7-23, 18-14
Pts: Paoline Salagnac (18); Rebs: Céline Dumerc (5); Asts: Céline Dumerc (6)		Pts: Candace Parker (20); Rebs: Olga Arteshina (10); Asts: Candace Parker (4)

DIVS Sport Hall, Yekaterinburg
Attendance: 5000
Referees: Miodrag Licina (SRB), Chris Dodds (SCO), Christoph Rohacky (AUT)

=== Final ===
13 April 2014
19:00 UTC+6

Report

Fenerbahçe	58–69	Galatasaray Odeabank
Scoring by quarter: 7-26, 22-16, 15-11, 14-16
Pts: Cappie Pondexter (18); Rebs: Cappie Pondexter(6); Asts: Agnieszka Bibrzycka, C.Pondexter(3)		Pts: Sancho Lyttle (19); Rebs: Sancho Lyttle (12); Asts: Işıl Alben (8)

DIVS Sport Hall, Yekaterinburg
Attendance: 6000
Referees: Jasmina Juras (SRB), Alessandro Martolini (ITA), Anne Panther (GER)

2013–14 EuroLeague Women Champions

Galatasaray Odeabank
First title

== Stats leaders in regular season ==
=== Points ===
Rk	Name	Team	Games	Points	PPG
1	(United States) Jantel Lavender	(Poland) Wisła Can-Pack	12	245	20.4
2	(Montenegro) Jelena Dubljević	(Czech Republic) ZVVZ USK Prague	12	225	18.8
3	(United States) Eshaya Murphy	(Spain) Perfumerías Avenida	12	224	18.7
4	(United States) DeWanna Bonner	(Russia) Nadezhda Orenburg	12	216	18.0
5	(United States) Plenette Pierson	(Slovakia) Good Angels Košice	6	105	17.5

=== Rebounds ===
Rk	Name	Team	Games	Rebounds	PPG
1	(Croatia) Luca Ivanković	(Croatia) Novi Zagreb	12	133	11.1
2	(United States) Jantel Lavender	(Poland) Wisła Can-Pack	12	129	10.8
3	(United States) Angelica Robinson	(Spain) Perfumerías Avenida	11	112	10.2
4	(France) Élodie Godin	(Italy) Beretta Famila	10	99	9.9
5	(United States) Candace Parker	(Russia) UMMC Ekaterinburg	10	92	9.2

=== Assists ===
Rk	Name	Team	Games	Assists	APG
1	(Spain) Laia Palau	(Czech Republic) ZVVZ USK Prague	12	92	7.7
2	(United States) Diana Taurasi	(Russia) UMMC Ekaterinburg	9	58	6.4
3	(Serbia) Miljana Bojović	(Slovakia) Good Angels Košice	10	60	6.0
4	(France) Céline Dumerc	(France) Tango Bourges	10	53	5.3
5	(Spain) Anna Cruz	(Russia) Nadezhda Orenburg	12	59	4.9

== See also ==
- 2013–14 EuroCup Women
