= 2014–15 EuroLeague Women =

- League: EuroLeague Women
- Sport: Basketball
- Duration: November 2014 – April 2015

Regular Season
- Season champions: Dynamo Kursk (Group A); Fenerbahçe (Group B)
- Season MVP: Alba Torrens (Ekaterinburg)
- Top scorer: Nneka Ogwumike (Kursk)

Final Four
- Champions: (Czech Republic) ZVVZ USK Praha
- Runners-up: (Russia) Ekaterinburg
- Finals MVP: Kia Vaughn

EuroLeague Women seasons
- ← 2013–14 2015–16 →

The 2014–15 EuroLeague Women season was the 19th edition of EuroLeague Women under its current name. Including the playoffs, the season ran from 11 November 2014 until 12 April 2015. Fifteen teams across eight countries were divided into two groups, with the top four from each group advancing to the postseason. Dynamo Kursk won Group A with a 10–2 record, while Fenerbahçe won Group B with an 11–3 record.

In the best-of-three quarterfinals, Dynamo Kursk beat CJM Bourges Basket, UMMC Ekaterinburg beat Nadezhda Orenburg, ZVVZ USK Praha knocked off CB Avenida, and Fenerbahçe beat Galatasaray OdeaBank. In the first semi-final, Praha upset Fenerbahçe 62–49. Ekaterinburg beat Dynamo Kurst 81–70 in the second semi-final, avenging two previous losses to Kurst on the season.

Praha, which hosted the Final Four, got off to a quick start in the final and led 17–12 after the first quarter. Ekaterinburg fought back in the final minutes of the second quarter, narrowing the lead to 32–28 at the half. Praha started the third quarter strong and held a double-digit lead through much of the quarter, ending it with 50–40 advantage. Ekaterinburg made multiple runs in the fourth quarter, narrowing the deficit to as few as four points. However, a basket by Danielle Robinson with 2:23 left extended the lead to 11. A furious comeback effort in the final minute cut the margin to two points with 6 seconds remaining before Jana Veselá hit two foul shots to provide the final margin of 72–68. In the third-place game, Kurst defeated Fenerbahçe, 67–58.

== Format ==
For the 2014–15 season, fifteen teams took part in the regular season. Participants were divided into two groups – one with eight teams and one with seven teams. The regular season began on 11 November 2014 and ended on 18 February 2015.

The top four teams of each group during the regular season advanced to the quarterfinal playoffs, which were played in a best-of-three format from 3 March until 11 March. The winners advanced to the Final Four, which were single elimination, with games taking place on 10 April and 12 April.

== Teams ==
Fifteen clubs entered the draw at Munich's Kempinski hotel on 6 July 2014. A potential 16th club could have been added with 24 hours, but was not.

Two countries had three clubs each (Russia and Turkey) and three countries had two teams each (Czech Republic, France, and Poland). The draw was structured such that Russia had two teams in one group and Turkey two teams in the other. The other multi-team countries had one team in each group.

	Seed 1	Seed 2	Seed 3	Seed 4	Seed 5	Seed 6	Seed 7	Seed 8
Group A	(Russia) UMMC Ekaterinburg	(Turkey) Galatasaray Odeabank	(Slovakia) Good Angels Košice	(Czech Republic) ZVVZ USK Praha	(Russia) Dynamo Kursk	(Poland) Wisła Can-Pack Kraków	(France) Basket Lattes	
Group B	(Turkey) Fenerbahçe	(France) CJM Bourges Basket	(Italy) PF Schio	(Turkey) Abdullah Gül Üniversitesi	(Russia) Nadezhda Orenburg	(Spain) CB Avenida	(Czech Republic) BK Brno	(Poland) Energa Toruń

Country	Teams	Teams (ranking in 2013–14 national championship)		
Russia	3	UMMC Ekaterinburg ^{(Champion)}	Nadezhda Orenburg ^{(2nd)}	Dynamo Kursk ^{(3rd)}
Turkey	3	Galatasaray Odeabank ^{(Champion)}	Fenerbahçe ^{(2nd)}	Abdullah Gül Üniversitesi ^{(3rd)}
Poland	2	Wisła Can-Pack Kraków ^{(Champion)}	Energa Toruń ^{(4th)}	
France	2	Basket Lattes ^{(Champion)}	CJM Bourges Basket ^{(2nd)}	
Czech Republic	2	ZVVZ USK Praha ^{(Champion)}	BK Brno ^{(2nd)}	
Spain	1	CB Avenida ^{(2nd)}		
Italy	1	PF Schio ^{(Champion)}		
Slovakia	1	Good Angels Košice ^{(Champion)}		

Key
2015 Euroleague Champion
Runner-up
Third place
Fourth place
Eliminated in quarterfinals
Eliminated in the regular season

== Regular season ==
Location of teams of the 2014–15 Euroleague Women regular season.
Red: Group A; Green: Group B.

When teams had the same record at the end of the regular season, tiebreakers were applied in the following order:

1. Head-to-head record of teams still tied.
2. Head-to-head point differential.
3. Point differential during the regular season.
4. Points scored during the regular season.
5. Sum of quotients of points scored and points allowed in each regular-season match.

=== Group A ===
Dynamo Kursk won Group A over fellow Russian team UMMC Ekaterinburg on a tiebreaker after both teams finished with a 10–2 record. USK Prague finished third with a 6–6 record. Galatasaray claimed the final playoff spot on the basis of a 2–0 record against Wisła Can-Pack after both clubs finished with a 5–7 record. Wisła's season, while disappointing overall, included a victory against Dynamo Kursk. Basket Lattes won three of their first four games, but recorded just one win the rest of the season to finish at 4–8. Lattes finished dead last in rebounding in the EuroLeague, but had the highest field-goal percentage and lowest points allowed of any team to miss the playoffs. Good Angels Košice finished last in the group with a 2–10 record. The team struggled to score, but did manage to sweep defending champion Galatasaray.

Pos	Team	Pld	W	L	PF	PA	PD	Pts	KUR	EKA	PRA	GAL	KRA	LAT	KOS
1	(Russia) Dynamo Kursk	12	10	2	926	844	+82	22 (Note: Tiebreaker: 2–0)		74–73	70–65	72–68	92–68	77–59	66–52
2	(Russia) UMMC Ekaterinburg	12	10	2	924	769	+155	22 (Note: Tiebreaker: 0–2)	77–78		84–74	77–67	106–63	77–69	75–52
3	(Czech Republic) ZVVZ USK Praha	12	6	6	854	853	+1	18	83–87	71–77		43–72	67–66	80–69	76–57
4	(Turkey) Galatasaray OdeaBank	12	5	7	759	757	+2	17 (Note: Tiebreaker: 2–0)	91–87	56–67	43–72		63–45	59–66	67–68
5	(Poland) Wisła Can-Pack Kraków	12	5	7	790	839	−49	17 (Note: Tiebreaker: 0–2)	77–62	56–66	86–72	53–64		76–70	70–50
6	(France) Basket Lattes	12	4	8	775	820	−45	16	61–69	58–74	72–77	48–59	72–62		65–60
7	(Slovakia) Good Angels Košice	12	2	10	694	840	−146	14	70–92	51–71	70–74	59–50	55–68	50–66	

=== Group B ===
Fenerbahçe won Group B with an 11–3 record. Nadezhda Orenburg finished in second place with a 10–4 record, winning the tiebreaker over Avenida on the basis of head-to-head point differential. Bourges Basket took the final playoff spot with a 9–5 record. Abdullah Gül Üniversitesi got off to a slow start, winning just one of their first five games. They finished strong, but a late loss to Nadezhda left them outside the playoffs with a final record of 7–7. Employing an aggressive style of play, the team finished first in most fouls drawn. BF Schio lost star player Chiney Ogwumike early in the year to injury, but still managed some impressive wins. The team scored 72.9 points per game, but also gave up the third most points per game in the league. In their inaugural EuroLeague season Toruń had three wins on the year, but were 1–9 in their last ten. They finished first in the league in steals, but gave up the second-most points per game. Brno did not win a single game on the season, and only kept the final margin in single digits once. They had the league's worst defense.

Pos	Team	Pld	W	L	PF	PA	PD	Pts	FEN	NAD	AVE	BOU	AGU	SCH	TOR	BRN
1	(Turkey) Fenerbahçe	14	11	3	1004	857	+147	25		65–54	66–63	75–50	73–57	68–63	76–63	79–54
2	(Russia) Nadezhda Orenburg	14	10	4	956	825	+131	24 (Note: Tiebreaker: 1–1 (+5))	64–56		66–50	78–68	49–53	84–74	65–63	88–55
3	(Spain) CB Avenida	14	10	4	973	859	+114	24 (Note: Tiebreaker: 1–1 (−5))	66–60	61–50		59–48	71–64	75–58	70–64	73–42
4	(France) CJM Bourges Basket	14	9	5	981	875	+106	23	67–61	58–50	73–55		79–71	79–67	72–54	88–38
5	(Turkey) Abdullah Gül Üniversitesi	14	7	7	1004	995	+9	21	78–84	64–71	71–63	77–73		75–82	96–76	64–53
6	(Italy) PF Schio	14	6	8	1021	1007	+14	20	59–75	58–77	65–90	79–59	74–80		93–61	87–58
7	(Poland) Energa Toruń	14	3	11	940	1102	−162	17	67–81	50–82	77–89	63–88	83–78	58–79		79–71
8	(Czech Republic) BK Brno	14	0	14	770	1129	−359	14	52–85	50–78	55–88	48–79	64–76	68–83	62–82	

== Quarter-finals ==
	Team no. 1	Agg.	Team no. 2	Game 1	Game 2	Game 3
1.	Dynamo Kursk (Russia)	2 – 1	(France) CJM Bourges Basket	75–62	62–64	88–72
2.	UMMC Ekaterinburg (Russia)	2 – 0	(Russia) Nadezhda Orenburg †	81–54	86–75	
3.	† CB Avenida (Spain)	0 – 2	(Czech Republic) ZVVZ USK Praha	48–50	43–72	
4.	Fenerbahçe (Turkey)	2 – 1	(Turkey) Galatasaray OdeaBank	58–56	57–59	63–52

Notes:

- † Despite Nadezhda finishing second in Group B, according to the EuroLeague Women Regulations Article 14, Note 1:
  "If there are three (3) clubs from the same country qualified for the Quarter-Final Play-Offs and two (2) of these clubs are scheduled to play each other according to the system of competition, no changes are required.
  If none of the three (3) clubs are scheduled to play each other according to the system of competition, then they will be ranked according to their results from the Regular Season. The 2nd ranked club will then play against the 3rd ranked club."
- † Taking into consideration the above regulation, CB Avenida (8–4) have the home court advantage over fellow third-placed team ZVVZ USK Prague (6–6) on account of their superior win–loss ratio.

== Final four ==
Semi-finals; 10 April
(Turkey) Fenerbahçe	49
(Czech Republic) ZVVZ USK Praha	62
(Russia) Dynamo Kursk	70
(Russia) UMMC Ekaterinburg	81

Final; 12 April
(Czech Republic) ZVVZ USK Praha	72
(Russia) UMMC Ekaterinburg	68
Third place
(Turkey) Fenerbahçe	58
(Russia) Dynamo Kursk	67

Bids to host the 2015 Final Four were accepted until 19 February. On 9 March, it was announced that USK Prague had held selected as the host club. It was the first time the club ever hosted the event, but not the first time it was held in the Czech Republic – Brno has hosted the tournament three times (1999, 2006, and 2008).

=== Semi-final 1 ===
10 April 2015
18:00

Recap

(Turkey) Fenerbahçe	49–62	(Czech Republic) ZVVZ USK Praha
Scoring by quarter: 18–17, 10–10, 14–18, 7–17
Pts: T. Charles – 14; Rebs: T. Charles, Q. Hollingsworth – 8 Asts: T. Charles, B. Demirmen – 2		Pts: K. Vaughn – 15; Rebs: K. Vaughn – 12; Asts: L. Palau – 7

Královka Arena
Attendance: 2,500
Referees: Jasmina Juras (SRB), Susana Gomez Lopez (ESP), Carole Delauné (FRA)

=== Semi-final 2 ===
10 April 2015
15:00

Recap

Dynamo Kursk (Russia)	70–81	(Russia) UMMC Ekaterinburg
Scoring by quarter: 13–26, 9–20, 27–16, 21–19
Pts: I. Alben – 15; Rebs: S. Augustus – 8 Asts: E. Prince – 5		Pts: S. Gruda – 20; Rebs: C. Parker – 15; Asts: C. Parker – 4

Královka Arena
Attendance: 2,100
Referees: Anne Panther (GER), Fabiana Martinescu (ROU), Maka Kupatadze (GEO)

=== Third-place game ===
12 April
15:00

Recap

(Russia) Dynamo Kursk	67–58	Fenerbahçe (Turkey)
Scoring by quarter: 18–12, 12–14, 18–16, 19–16
Pts: N. Ogwumike – 21; Rebs: N. Ogwumike – 14; Asts: S. Augustus – 4		Pts: T. Charles – 23; Rebs: Q. Hollingsworth – 11; Asts: B. Demirmen – 2

Královka Arena
Attendance: 2,100
Referees: Anne Panther (GER), Carole Delauné (FRA), Sonia Teixeira (POR)

=== Final ===
The starting five for UMMC Ekaterinburg were Kristi Toliver, Deanna Nolan, Alba Torrens, Candace Parker, and Sandrine Gruda. USK Prague started Laia Palau, Danielle Robinson, Jana Veselá, Sonja Petrovic, and Kia Vaughn. Although the game was held in Prague, Ekaterinburg was considered the favorite.

Praha used a series of fast breaks and efficient three-point shooting to get off to an early 17–10 lead. A layup by Silvia Dominguez made the score 17–12 at the end of the first quarter.

In the second quarter, Prague quickly extended its lead to nine points. After a basket by Veselá again put Prague up by nine, 27–18, with 3:27 left in the quarter, Ekaterinburg scored the next six points to get within three. The final 1:40 of the quarter saw several scores by both teams, ending with two free throws by Toliver that made the score 32–28 in favor of Prague at the halftime break. Gruda led all players with 11 points, while Parker led with 6 rebounds. Veselá led Prague with 9 points. Ekaterinburg won the rebounding battle 23–16, but failed to make a three-pointer (0/7). Prague was 4/6 on three-point attempts.

Efficient offensive by Prague, and especially Robinson who scored 10 points in the third quarter, allowed Prague to build a double-digit lead. Prague's defense was also good in the period, not allowing a single fast-break point. At the end of the quarter, the score was Prague 50–40.

The "beautiful" fourth quarter saw a comeback effort by Ekaterinburg led by Parker and Gruda. With six minutes to go, a Parker basket and subsequent foul shot cut the lead to four. However, two quick baskets by Prague pushed the lead back to nine. A Veselá steal and layup, described by FIBA as the game's most crucial play, and a basket by Robinson with 2:23 to play gave Prague a 67–56 lead and seemingly put the game out of reach. However, a furious comeback effort by Ekaterinburg ensued. Parker made back-to-back baskets while drawing fouls. She missed the free throw on the second one, but got the rebound and a basket, resulting in 7 total points between the two possessions. Prague missed several foul shots, leaving the door partially open for Ekaterinburg. A steal and basket by Nolan with six seconds left cut the gap to two points. However, Veselá hit two foul shots to seal the victory and provide the final 72–68 margin.

Vaughn scored 18 points (12 in the second half) and grabbed 12 rebounds. She was named MVP of the Final Four thanks in part to a strong semi-final performance. Robinson scored a team-high 24, while also recording 4 rebounds and 3 assists. Parker led all players with 27 points and 14 rebounds in a losing effort. Gruda added 19 points and 9 rebounds, and Torrens scored 12. The rest of the team scored just 10 points on 4/24 shooting. As a team, Ekaterinburg was just 1/16 on three-pointers compared to 5/9 for Prague.

The win gave Natália Hejková her fifth Euroleague title as a coach and made her the first coach to lead three different clubs to a title. She previously coached Ružomberok to the title in 1999 and 2000 and Spartak Moscow to the title in 2007 and 2008. She has never lost a final game. Veselá claimed her third title as a player, all with different teams, becoming the sixth player to win at least three Euroleague Women titles.

12 April 2015
18:00

Recap

ZVVZ USK Praha (Czech Republic)	72–68	(Russia) UMMC Ekaterinburg
Scoring by quarter: 17–12, 15–16, 18–12, 22–28
Pts: D. Robinson – 24; Rebs: K. Vaughn – 12; Asts: L. Palau – 6		Pts: C. Parker – 27; Rebs: C. Parker – 14; Asts: D. Nolan – 4

Sportovni Hala Kralovka (Prague)
Attendance: 2,500
Referees: Jasmina Juras (SRB), Fabiana Martinescu (ROU), Maka Kupatadze (GEO)

== Statistical leaders ==
Alba Torrens of UMMC Ekaterinburg was named Player of the Year.

Statistical leaders include the postseason are sorted on a per game basis.

=== Points ===
Rk	Name	Team	Games	Points	PPG
1	(United States) Nneka Ogwumike	(Russia) Dynamo Kursk	17	331	19.5
2	(United States) Diana Taurasi	(Russia) UMMC Ekaterinburg	14	236	16.9
3	(United States) Jantel Lavender	(Poland) Wisła Can-Pack Kraków	12	202	16.8
4	(United States) DeWanna Bonner	(Russia) Nadezhda Orenburg	15	251	16.7
5	(United States) Candace Parker	(Russia) UMMC Ekaterinburg	16	254	15.9

Source: FIBA Europe

=== Rebounds ===
Rk	Name	Team	Games	Rebounds	RPG
1	(United States) Candace Parker	(Russia) UMMC Ekaterinburg	16	176	11.0
1	(United States) Nneka Ogwumike	(Russia) Dynamo Kursk	17	182	10.7
3	(United States) Jenna Smith	(Czech Republic) BK Brno	14	144	10.3
4	(United States) Angelica Robinson	(Spain) CB Avenida	16	164	10.3
5	(United States) Jantel Lavender	(Poland) Wisła Can-Pack Kraków	12	122	10.2

Source: FIBA Europe

=== Assists ===
Rk	Name	Team	Games	Assists	APG
1	(Spain) Laia Palau	(Czech Republic) ZVVZ USK Praha	16	114	7.1
2	(United States) Diana Taurasi	(Russia) UMMC Ekaterinburg	14	83	5.9
3	(Russia) Epiphanny Prince	(Russia) Dynamo Kursk	17	87	5.1
5	(United States) Courtney Vandersloot	(Poland) Wisła Can-Pack Kraków	12	53	4.4
5	(Spain) Nuria Martínez	(Turkey) Galatasaray OdeaBank	15	64	4.3

Source: FIBA Europe

== See also ==
- 2014–15 EuroCup Women
