= 2015–16 EuroLeague Women =

EuroLeague Women
- Season: 2015–16
- Duration: 14 October 2015 — 17 April 2016
- Games played: 125
- Teams: 16 (Regular Season)

Finals
- Champions: (Russia) UMMC Ekaterinburg
- Runners-up: (Russia) Nadezhda Orenburg
- Third place: (Turkey) Fenerbahçe
- Fourth place: (Czech Republic) ZVVZ USK Praha
- Finals MVP: Diana Taurasi

The 2015–16 EuroLeague Women season is the 20th edition of EuroLeague Women under its current name.

== Teams ==
Teams and seedings were unveiled by FIBA Europe on 3 July 2015.

Regular season
(Russia) UMMC Ekaterinburg (1st)	(Turkey) AGÜ Spor (2nd)	(Czech Republic) ZVVZ USK Praha (1st)	(Slovakia) Good Angels Košice (1st)
(Russia) Nadezhda Orenburg (2nd)	(Turkey) Fenerbahçe (3rd)	(Poland) Wisła Can-Pack Kraków (1st)	(Italy) Famila Schio (1st)
(Russia) Dynamo Kursk (3rd)	(France) Tango Bourges Basket (1st)	(Hungary) Uniqa Sopron (1st)	(Belgium) Mithra Castors Braine (1st)
(Turkey) Galatasaray Odeabank (1st)	(France) Villeneuve-d'Ascq (2nd)	(Spain) Spar CityLift Girona (1st)	
Qualification round
(Spain) CB Avenida (2nd)	(Czech Republic) BK Zabiny Brno (2nd)		

== Draw ==
17 teams registered for EuroLeague Women 2015–16, resulting in 15 direct qualifiers, and one preliminary round to be played between BK Brno and CB Avenida. However, on August 6, BK Brno announced its withdrawal from European competitions due to financial reasons, automatically qualifying Perfumerías Avenida to the Regular Season

Seed	Regular Season	
1	(Russia) UMMC Ekaterinburg	(Turkey) Fenerbahçe
2	(Turkey) Galatasaray	(Czech Republic) ZVVZ USK Praha
3	(France) Tango Bourges Basket	(Russia) Dynamo Kursk
4	(Slovakia) Good Angels Košice	(Russia) Nadezhda Orenburg
5	(Turkey) AGÜ Spor	(Italy) Famila Schio
6	(Poland) Wisła Can-Pack Kraków	(France) Villeneuve-d'Ascq
7	(Hungary) Uniqa Sopron	(Belgium) Mithra Castors Braine
8	(Spain) Spar CityLift Girona	QR Winner

== Regular season ==
Location of teams of the 2015–16 Euroleague Women regular season.
Green: Group A; Red: Group B.

Regular season will start on October 14 and will finish on February 10, 2016.

The four top teams of each group will qualify to the quarterfinals.

If teams are level on record at the end of the Regular Season, tiebreakers are applied in the following order:

1. Head-to-head record.
2. Head-to-head point differential.
3. Point differential during the Regular Season.
4. Points scored during the regular season.
5. Sum of quotients of points scored and points allowed in each Regular Season game.

=== Group A ===
Pos	Team	Pld	W	L	PF	PA	PD	Pts	Qualification	FEN	FAM	KUR	GAL	KOŠ	VIL	AVE	SOP
1	(Turkey) Fenerbahçe	14	12	2	927	834	+93	26	Advance to quarterfinals	—	60 – 66	66 – 56	57 – 56	62 – 45	77 – 54	64 – 59	86 – 69
2	(Italy) Famila Schio	14	10	4	1022	892	+130	24	Advance to quarterfinals	62 – 64	—	79 – 72	64 – 70	89 – 63	75 – 57	88 – 70	97 – 61
3	(Russia) Dynamo Kursk	14	10	4	1012	855	+157	24	Advance to quarterfinals	72 – 40	63 – 58	—	75 – 60	70 – 49	66 – 49	77 – 64	98 – 63
4	(Turkey) Galatasaray Odeabank	14	9	5	889	829	+60	23	Advance to quarterfinals	60 – 71	58 – 75	62 – 55	—	69 – 57	59 – 35	61 – 59	81 – 56
5	(Slovakia) Good Angels Košice	14	5	9	869	893	−24	19	Transfer to EuroCup Women	58 – 67	56 – 69	53 – 64	54 – 49	—	55 – 60	66 – 47	81 – 53
6	(France) Villeneuve-d'Ascq	14	5	9	842	920	−78	19	Transfer to EuroCup Women	55 – 69	70 – 73	78 – 70	62 – 66	48 – 78	—	78 – 66	78 – 44
7	(Spain) Perfumerías Avenida	14	4	10	902	945	−43	18	Eliminated	70 – 75	63 – 52	66 – 72	49 – 62	76 – 68	72 – 49	—	74 – 60
8	(Hungary) Uniqa Sopron	14	1	13	844	1139	−295	15	Eliminated	52 – 69	65 – 75	68 – 102	60 – 76	70 – 86	50 – 69	73 – 67	—

Updated to match(es) played on 10 February 2016. Source: FibaEurope.com

=== Group B ===
Pos	Team	Pld	W	L	PF	PA	PD	Pts	Qualification	EKA	NAD	USK	WIS	BOU	AGÜ	BRA	GIR
1	(Russia) UMMC Ekaterinburg	14	12	2	1050	854	+196	26	Advance to quarterfinals	—	74 – 84	76 – 73	89 – 48	69 – 63	93 – 48	75 – 70	80 – 61
2	(Russia) Nadezhda Orenburg	14	9	5	907	844	+63	23	Advance to quarterfinals	54 – 64	—	58 – 54	67 – 70	66 – 58	68 – 61	63 – 70	65 – 41
3	(Czech Republic) ZVVZ USK Praha	14	8	6	937	826	+111	22	Advance to quarterfinals	52 – 69	67 – 59	—	64 – 40	63 – 49	68 – 72	75 – 58	68 – 43
4	(Poland) Wisła Can-Pack Kraków	14	7	7	824	945	−121	21	Advance to quarterfinals	52 – 88	54 – 51	57 – 78	—	66 – 64	67 – 66	69 – 76	54 – 46
5	(France) Tango Bourges Basket	14	6	8	842	841	+1	20	Transfer to EuroCup Women	58 – 65	61 – 71	65 – 75	63 – 45	—	63 – 57	57 – 52	68 – 47
6	(Turkey) AGÜ Spor	14	5	9	902	958	−56	19	Transfer to EuroCup Women	68 – 54	67 – 75	77 – 75	66 – 68	55 – 62	—	60 – 56	79 – 69
7	(Belgium) Mithra Castors Braine	14	5	9	868	946	−78	19	Eliminated	52 – 78	47 – 67	49 – 73	65 – 74	63 – 55	68 – 64	—	73 – 60
8	(Spain) Spar CityLift Girona	14	4	10	805	921	−116	18	Eliminated	71 – 76	56 – 59	54 – 52	62 – 60	47 – 56	72 – 62	76 – 69	—

Updated to match(es) played on 10 February 2016. Source:

== Quarter-finals ==
Quarter-finals will be played on March 8, 11 and 16, 2016.

Team #1	Agg.	Team #2	1st	2nd	3rd
Fenerbahçe (Turkey)	2–0	(Poland) Wisła Can-Pack Kraków	79–70	79–63	
Famila Schio (Italy)	0–2	(Czech Republic) ZVVZ USK Praha	56–68	53–86	
UMMC Ekaterinburg (Russia)	2–1	(Turkey) Galatasaray Odeabank	72–56	57–66	86–66
Nadezhda Orenburg (Russia)	2–0	(Russia) Dynamo Kursk	78–68	73–70	

== Final Four ==
The Final Four will be played on April 15 and 17, 2016.

Semi-finals; 15 April
(Turkey) Fenerbahçe	68
(Russia) Nadezhda Orenburg	74
(Czech Republic) ZVVZ USK Praha	72
(Russia) UMMC Ekaterinburg	78

Final; 17 April
(Russia) Nadezhda Orenburg	69
(Russia) UMMC Ekaterinburg	72
Third place
(Turkey) Fenerbahçe	73
(Czech Republic) ZVVZ USK Praha	69

All times are local (UTC+3).

=== Semifinals ===
15 April 2016
17:00

Report

ZVVZ USK Praha (Czech Republic)	72–78	(Russia) UMMC Ekaterinburg
Scoring by quarter: 13–14, 9–19, 12–13, 38–32
Pts: Petrović, Šteinberga 21; Rebs: Šteinberga 10; Asts: Palau 8		Pts: Taurasi 21; Rebs: Lyttle, Meesseman 9 Asts: three players 3

Fenerbahce Ulker Arena, Istanbul
Attendance: 500
Referees:
Anne Panther (GER)
Manuel Mazzoni (ITA)
Georgios Poursanidis (GRE)

15 April 2016
20:00

Report

Fenerbahçe (Turkey)	68–74	(Russia) Nadezhda Orenburg
Scoring by quarter: 16–18, 12–18, 12–17, 28–21
Pts: Lavender 24; Rebs: Lavender 11; Asts: Vardarlı 6		Pts: Bonner 20; Rebs: Bonner 8 Asts: Cruz 4

Fenerbahce Ulker Arena, Istanbul
Attendance: 4,252
Referees:
Dragan Neskovic (SRB)
Andris Aunkrogers (LAT)
Milan Nedović (SLO)

=== Third place game ===
17 April 2016
14:00

Report

Fenerbahçe (Turkey)	73–69	(Czech Republic) ZVVZ USK Praha
Scoring by quarter: 18–24, 19–10, 12–16, 24–19
Pts: Quigley 22; Rebs: Hollingsworth 8 Asts: three players 3		Pts: Vaughn 17; Rebs: Petrović 10; Asts: Palau 6

Fenerbahce Ulker Arena, Istanbul
Attendance: 2,678
Referees:
Dragan Neskovic (SRB)
Anne Panther (GER)
Andrada Monika Csender (ROU)

=== Final ===
17 April 2016
17:00

Report

Nadezhda Orenburg (Russia)	69–72	(Russia) UMMC Ekaterinburg
Scoring by quarter: 19–17, 21–16, 16–15, 13–24
Pts: Bonner 26; Rebs: Robinson 10; Asts: Cruz 5		Pts: Taurasi 22; Rebs: Lyttle 12; Asts: Toliver 5

Fenerbahce Ulker Arena, Istanbul
Attendance: 1,264
Referees:
Manuel Mazzoni (ITA)
Georgios Poursanidis (GRE)
Milan Nedović (SLO)

2015–16 EuroLeague Women Champions

UMMC Ekaterinburg
Third title

== Statistical leaders ==
=== Points ===
Rk	Name	Team	Games	Points	PPG
1	(United States) Diana Taurasi	(Russia) UMMC Ekaterinburg	19	397	20.9
2	(United States) Nneka Ogwumike	(Russia) Dynamo Kursk	16	283	17.7
3	(United States) DeWanna Bonner	(Russia) Nadezhda Orenburg	18	313	17.4
4	(Turkey) Lara Sanders	(Turkey) AGÜ Spor	13	205	15.8
4	(Serbia) Sonja Petrović	(Czech Republic) ZVVZ USK Praha	13	205	15.8

=== Rebounds ===
Rk	Name	Team	Games	Rebounds	RPG
1	(United States) Crystal Langhorne	(Slovakia) Good Angels Košice	14	151	10.8
2	(United States) DeWanna Bonner	(Russia) Nadezhda Orenburg	18	169	9.4
3	(Turkey) Lara Sanders	(Turkey) AGÜ Spor	13	118	9.1
4	(United States) Nneka Ogwumike	(Russia) Dynamo Kursk	16	142	8.9
5	(United States) Kia Vaughn	(Czech Republic) ZVVZ USK Praha	18	159	8.8

=== Assists ===
Rk	Name	Team	Games	Assists	APG
1	(Spain) Laia Palau	(Czech Republic) ZVVZ USK Praha	18	128	7.1
2	(Belgium) Marjorie Carpréaux	(Belgium) Mithra Castors Braine	14	75	5.4
3	(Spain) Silvia Domínguez	(Spain) Perfumerías Avenida	14	73	5.2
4	(United States) Chelsea Gray	(Spain) Spar CityLift Girona	10	52	5.2
5	(Turkey) Işıl Alben	(Turkey) Galatasaray OdeaBank	17	87	5.1

== See also ==
- 2015–16 EuroCup Women
