= 2018–19 Liga Femenina de Baloncesto =

Liga Dia^{1}
- Season: 2018–19
- Games played: 182 (Regular season); 16 (Playoffs)
- Teams: 14
- TV partners: Teledeporte; Canal FEB (streaming)

Regular season
- Relegated: Snatt's Femení Sant Adrià; Baxi Ferrol

Finals
- Champions: Spar CityLift Girona (2nd title)
- Runners-up: Perfumerías Avenida
- Semi-finalists: Cadí La Seu; Valencia Basket

Statistical leaders
Points	Ariel Edwards	17.73
Rebounds	Mariam Coulibaly	10.88
Assists	Anna Gómez	6.12
Index Rating	Mariam Coulibaly	17.04
- ^{1} Sponsored league name, referring to Dia.

The 2018–19 Liga Femenina de Baloncesto, also known as Liga Dia for sponsorship reasons, is the 56th season of the Spanish basketball women's league. Regular season will start on 13 October 2018 with the first matchday of the regular season and it will end on 7 April 2019 with the 26th matchday. The playoffs (quarter-finals, semi-finals and final) will be held between 10 April and 5/9 May 2019.

The 2019 Spanish Cup will return to the Final Eight format, not used since 2009. It will be played between 28 February and 3 March 2019, featuring the top seven teams of the league after the 13th matchday on December 30, which will join the host.

== Teams ==
=== Promotion and relegation (pre-season) ===
A total of 14 teams contest the league, including 12 sides from the 2017–18 season and two promoted from the 2017–18 Liga Femenina 2.

Teams promoted from Liga Femenina 2

- Durán Maquinaria Ensino
- Valencia Basket

=== Venues and locations ===
Location of teams in 2018–19 Liga Dia

Team	Home city	Arena
Baxi Ferrol	Ferrol	Esteiro
Cadí La Seu	La Seu d'Urgell	Palau d'Esports
Durán Maquinaria Ensino	Lugo	Pazo dos Deportes
Embutidos Pajariel Bembibre PDM	Bembibre	Bembibre Arena
IDK Gipuzkoa	San Sebastián	José Antonio Gasca
Lointek Gernika Bizkaia	Gernika	Maloste
Mann-Filter Casablanca	Zaragoza	Eduardo Lastrada
Nissan Al-Qázeres Extremadura	Cáceres	Juan Serrano Macayo
Perfumerías Avenida	Salamanca	Würzburg
Quesos El Pastor	Zamora	Ángel Nieto
RPK Araski	Vitoria-Gasteiz	Mendizorrotza
Snatt's Femení Sant Adrià	Sant Adrià de Besòs	Marina Besòs
Spar CityLift Girona	Girona	Fontajau
Valencia Basket	Valencia	Fuente de San Luis

== Regular season ==
=== League table ===
Pos	Team	Pld	W	L	PF	PA	PD	Pts	Qualification or relegation
1	Perfumerías Avenida	26	25	1	1945	1393	+552	51	Qualification to playoffs
2	Spar CityLift Girona	26	22	4	1971	1520	+451	48	Qualification to playoffs
3	Cadí La Seu	26	19	7	1839	1641	+198	45	Qualification to playoffs
4	Lointek Gernika Bizkaia	26	18	8	1845	1719	+126	44	Qualification to playoffs
5	Valencia Basket	26	18	8	1766	1611	+155	44	Qualification to playoffs
6	IDK Gipuzkoa	26	15	11	1639	1610	+29	41	Qualification to playoffs
7	RPK Araski	26	10	16	1608	1761	−153	36	Qualification to playoffs
8	Mann-Filter Casablanca	26	10	16	1565	1724	−159	36	Qualification to playoffs
9	Embutidos Pajariel Bembibre PDM	26	9	17	1538	1720	−182	35	
10	Durán Maquinaria Ensino	26	9	17	1731	1833	−102	35	
11	Nissan Al-Qázeres Extremadura	26	9	17	1724	1854	−130	35	
12	Quesos El Pastor	26	8	18	1648	1834	−186	34	
13	Snatt's Femení Sant Adrià	26	7	19	1658	1853	−195	33	Relegation to LF 2
14	Baxi Ferrol	26	3	23	1517	1921	−404	29	Relegation to LF 2

Source: Liga Femenina

=== Positions by round ===
The table lists the positions of teams after completion of each round. In order to preserve chronological evolvements, any postponed matches are not included in the round at which they were originally scheduled, but added to the full round they were played immediately afterwards. For example, if a match is scheduled for round 13, but then postponed and played between rounds 16 and 17, it will be added to the standings for round 16.

Team ╲ Round	1	2	3	4	5	6	7	8	9	10	11	12	13	14	15	16	17	18	19	20	21	22	23	24	25	26
Perfumerías Avenida	4	2	2	2	1	1	1	1	1	2	2	2	2	2	2	2	2	2	2	2	2	2	1	1	1	1
Spar CityLift Girona	2	1	1	1	3	3	3	3	2	1	1	1	1	1	1	1	1	1	1	1	1	1	2	2	2	2
Cadí La Seu	5	4	6	6	6	7	5	5	5	4	4	4	4	4	4	4	4	4	4	4	4	4	3	3	3	3
Lointek Gernika Bizkaia	1	3	3	3	2	2	2	2	3	3	3	3	3	3	3	3	3	3	3	3	3	3	4	4	4	4
Valencia Basket	11	11	12	12	8	6	6	6	6	6	5	5	5	5	5	5	5	5	5	5	5	5	5	5	5	5
IDK Gipuzkoa	7	5	4	5	4	4	4	4	4	5	6	6	6	6	6	6	6	6	6	6	6	6	6	6	6	6
RPK Araski	6	6	5	4	5	5	7	7	7	7	8	8	9	8	9	7	7	7	7	7	7	7	7	7	7	7
Mann-Filter Casablanca	13	12	10	7	9	11	12	9	10	11	10	10	11	10	10	10	10	10	11	10	10	10	8	8	8	8
Embutidos Pajariel	8	10	11	9	10	9	9	10	11	12	12	13	13	13	12	12	11	11	10	11	11	8	9	9	9	9
Durán Maquinaria	10	8	8	8	7	10	10	11	12	9	9	9	8	7	7	8	8	8	8	8	8	11	10	10	11	10
Nissan Al-Qázeres	3	7	9	11	11	8	8	8	8	8	7	7	7	9	8	9	9	9	9	9	9	9	11	11	10	11
Quesos El Pastor	9	9	7	10	12	12	11	12	9	10	11	11	10	11	11	11	12	12	12	13	12	12	12	12	12	12
Snatt's Sant Adrià	14	14	14	14	13	13	13	13	13	13	13	12	12	12	13	13	13	13	13	12	13	13	13	13	13	13
Baxi Ferrol	12	13	13	13	14	14	14	14	14	14	14	14	14	14	14	14	14	14	14	14	14	14	14	14	14	14

Leader
Playoffs berth
Relegation to Liga Femenina 2

Source: FEB

== Playoffs ==
Quarter-finals
1 Perfumerías Avenida	77	79
8 Mann-Filter Casablanca	51	56
4 Lointek Gernika Bizkaia	69	66	49
5 Valencia Basket	76	54	75
2 Spar CityLift Girona	69	68
7 RPK Araski	59	41
3 Cadí La Seu	84	56	80
6 IDK Gipuzkoa	73	62	78

Semi-finals
1 Perfumerías Avenida	80	74
5 Valencia Basket	57	54
2 Spar CityLift Girona	69	74
3 Cadí La Seu	48	73

Final
1 Perfumerías Avenida	64	65
2 Spar CityLift Girona	70	73

Source: FEB

=== Quarterfinals ===
==== (1) Perfumerías Avenida vs. (8) Mann-Filter Casablanca ====
10 April 2019	Perfumerías Avenida	77–51 (Series: 1–0)	Mann-Filter Casablanca	Salamanca
20:30	Scoring by quarter: 20–20, 26–12, 10–11, 21–8
	Pts: Loyd 18; Rebs: Gil 8 Asts: S. Domínguez 8 PIR: Givens 19	Boxscore	Pts: Gimeno 17; Rebs: Dornstauder 9 Asts: Flores 4 PIR: Dornstauder 21	Arena: Würzburg; Referees: Quintas, Lema, Cañigueral

14 April 2019	Mann-Filter Casablanca	56–79 (Series: 2–0)	Perfumerías Avenida	Zaragoza
12:15	Scoring by quarter: 15–25, 18–16, 16–24, 7–14
	Pts: Gimeno 14; Rebs: Dornstauder 10; Asts: four players 2 PIR: Dornstauder 23	Boxscore	Pts: Loyd 19; Rebs: De Souza 14; Asts: S. Domínguez 3 PIR: Loyd 23	Arena: Eduardo Lastrada; Referees: Sacristán, Vázquez, Caamaño

==== (2) Spar CityLift Girona vs. (7) RPK Araski ====
10 April 2019	Spar CityLift Girona	69–59 (Series: 1–0)	RPK Araski	Girona
19:30	Scoring by quarter: 12–16, 21–13, 20–11, 16–19
	Pts: Williams 15; Rebs: Williams, Murphy 7 Asts: Palau, Williams 4 PIR: Williams 29	Boxscore	Pts: Edwards 22; Rebs: Edwards 7 Asts: Edwards 3 PIR: Edwards 28	Arena: Fontajau; Referees: Morales, Carpallo, Pazos

14 April 2019	RPK Araski	41–68 (Series: 2–0)	Spar CityLift Girona	Vitoria-Gasteiz
20:00	Scoring by quarter: 12–20, 7–17, 13–20, 9–11
	Pts: Molinuevo 11; Rebs: Pardo 6 Asts: three players 2 PIR: Molinuevo 11	Boxscore	Pts: Hampton 16; Rebs: Hampton 13; Asts: Palau 4 PIR: Hampton 24	Arena: Mendizorrotza; Referees: Morales, Lizana, Espiau

==== (3) Cadí La Seu vs. (6) IDK Gipuzkoa ====
10 April 2019	Cadí La Seu	84–73 (Series: 1–0)	IDK Gipuzkoa	La Seu d'Urgell
20:00	Scoring by quarter: 22–18, 21–22, 24–18, 17–15
	Pts: Vilaró 29; Rebs: Bahí 7 Asts: Kraker 4 PIR: Vilaró 37	Boxscore	Pts: Weaver 19; Rebs: Aduriz, Westbeld 6 Asts: Sarr, L. González 3 PIR: Sarr 19	Arena: Palau d'Esports; Referees: De Lucas, López, Sánchez

14 April 2019	IDK Gipuzkoa	62–56 (Series: 1–1)	Cadí La Seu	San Sebastián
12:00	Scoring by quarter: 14–13, 22–13, 14–14, 12–16
	Pts: Weaver 22; Rebs: Weaver 10; Asts: Brkić 4 PIR: Weaver 25	Boxscore	Pts: Hempe 12; Rebs: Bahí 8 Asts: Y. Díaz, Vilaró 3 PIR: Kraker, Bahí 12	Arena: José Antonio Gasca; Referees: Palomo, Sánchez, Albacete

17 April 2019	Cadí La Seu	80–78(OT) (Series: 2–1)	IDK Gipuzkoa	La Seu d'Urgell
20:00	Scoring by quarter: 17–21, 11–13, 18–16, 21–17, Overtime: 13–11
	Pts: Y. Díaz 25; Rebs: Bahí 12; Asts: Kraker, Y. Díaz 3 PIR: Y. Díaz 24	Boxscore	Pts: Weaver 24; Rebs: Sarr 8 Asts: Brkić 7 PIR: Weaver 24	Arena: Palau d'Esports; Referees: Martínez, Muñoz, Iglesias

==== (4) Lointek Gernika Bizkaia vs. (5) Valencia Basket ====
10 April 2019	Lointek Gernika Bizkaia	69–76 (Series: 0–1)	Valencia Basket	Gernika
20:30	Scoring by quarter: 22–17, 17–13, 16–24, 14–22
	Pts: Berezhynska 16; Rebs: Williams 6 Asts: Vanderwal 6 PIR: Berezhynska 18	Boxscore	Pts: Pina 17; Rebs: A. Gómez 11; Asts: A. Gómez 6 PIR: Pina 18	Arena: Maloste; Referees: García, García, Franquesa

14 April 2019	Valencia Basket	54–66 (Series: 1–1)	Lointek Gernika Bizkaia	Valencia
20:00	Scoring by quarter: 17–21, 14–18, 14–20, 9–7
	Pts: A. Gómez 14; Rebs: Pina 9 Asts: A. Gómez 7 PIR: A. Gómez 21	Boxscore	Pts: Williams 17; Rebs: Williams 9 Asts: Banham 3 PIR: Williams 20	Arena: Fuente de San Luis; Referees: López, Lucas, Marqueta

17 April 2019	Lointek Gernika Bizkaia	49–75 (Series: 1–2)	Valencia Basket	Gernika
20:00	Scoring by quarter: 8–18, 12–15, 8–20, 21–22
	Pts: Williams 11; Rebs: Williams, Roundtree 5 Asts: Vanderwal 3 PIR: Pascua 16	Boxscore	Pts: Abalde, Tirera 16; Rebs: Davis 7 Asts: A. Gómez 8 PIR: Abalde 19	Arena: Maloste; Referees: Alcaraz, Mas, González

=== Semifinals ===
==== (1) Perfumerías Avenida vs. (5) Valencia Basket ====
21 April 2019	Perfumerías Avenida	80–57 (Series: 1–0)	Valencia Basket	Salamanca
20:00	Scoring by quarter: 19–20, 18–13, 27–11, 16–13
	Pts: L. Gil, Loyd 13; Rebs: Robinson 9 Asts: Goree 4 PIR: De Souza 14	Boxscore	Pts: Tirera 15; Rebs: Brown 6 Asts: A. Gómez 4 PIR: Abalde 13	Arena: Würzburg; Referees: Bravo, Langa, Gómez

25 April 2019	Valencia Basket	54–74 (Series: 2–0)	Perfumerías Avenida	Valencia
21:00	Scoring by quarter: 14–24, 8–16, 16–22, 16–12
	Pts: Tirera 16; Rebs: four players 5 Asts: three players 3 PIR: Tirera 14	Boxscore	Pts: Loyd 23; Rebs: De Souza 8 Asts: S. Domínguez 6 PIR: Loyd 32	Arena: Fuente de San Luis; Referees: Zafra, Lucas, Espiau

==== (2) Spar CityLift Girona vs. (3) Cadí La Seu ====
21 April 2019	Spar CityLift Girona	69–48 (Series: 1–0)	Cadí La Seu	Girona
19:00	Scoring by quarter: 19–12, 16–15, 16–11, 18–10
	Pts: Hampton 15; Rebs: Reisingerova 8 Asts: Palau 7 PIR: N. Martínez 15	Boxscore	Pts: Y. Díaz 15; Rebs: Richards 8 Asts: Pujol 2 PIR: Y. Díaz 9	Arena: Fontajau; Referees: Zamora, Cañigueral, Lázaro

25 April 2019	Cadí La Seu	73–74 (Series: 2–0)	Spar CityLift Girona	La Seu d'Urgell
20:00	Scoring by quarter: 16–14, 23–20, 21–22, 13–18
	Pts: Y. Díaz 15; Rebs: Vilaró 9 Asts: Vilaró 3 PIR: Vilaró 17	Boxscore	Pts: Hampton 20; Rebs: Palau, Pierre-Louis 8 Asts: Palau 5 PIR: Pierre-Louis, Hampton 18	Arena: Palau d'Esports; Referees: Munar, Lema, Fernández

=== Final ===
==== (1) Perfumerías Avenida vs. (2) Spar CityLift Girona ====
2 May 2019	Perfumerías Avenida	64–70 (Series: 0–1)	Spar CityLift Girona	Salamanca
20:00	Scoring by quarter: 7–24, 20–11, 18–19, 19–16
	Pts: Loyd 25; Rebs: Robinson 10; Asts: L. Gil 4 PIR: Loyd, Robinson 16	Boxscore	Pts: Hampton 25; Rebs: four players 5 Asts: Palau 4 PIR: Hampton 27	Arena: Würzburg; Referees: Morales, García, Marqueta

5 May 2019	Spar CityLift Girona	73–65 (Series: 0–2)	Perfumerías Avenida	Girona
21:00	Scoring by quarter: 16–21, 15–14, 22–7, 20–23
	Pts: Reisingerova 17; Rebs: Williams 10; Asts: Palau 3 PIR: Williams 16	Boxscore	Pts: L. Gil, Loyd 15; Rebs: L. Gil 9 Asts: S. Domínguez 5 PIR: L. Gil 20	Arena: Fontajau; Referees: Morales, Lema, Langa

== Stats leaders in regular season ==
=== Points ===
Rk	Name	Team	Games	Points	PPG
1	(United States) Ariel Edwards	RPK Araski	26	461	17.7
2	(Paraguay) Paola Ferrari	Nissan Al-Qázeres Extremadura	26	449	17.3
3	(United States) Lyndra Weaver	IDK Gipuzkoa	23	371	16.1
4	(Russia) Julia Gladkova	Embutidos Pajariel Bembibre PDM	26	401	15.4
5	(United States) Shay Murphy	Spar CityLift Girona	20	304	15.2

=== Rebounds ===
Rk	Name	Team	Games	Rebounds	RPG
1	(Mali) Mariam Coulibaly	Snatt's Femení Sant Adrià	25	272	10.9
2	(Nigeria) Atonye Nyingifa	Durán Maquinaria Ensino	26	234	9
3	(United States) Lyndra Weaver	IDK Gipuzkoa	23	202	8.8
4	(Netherlands) Chatilla van Grinsven	Baxi Ferrol	25	204	8.2
5	(Spain) Paula Ginzo	Nissan Al-Qázeres Extremadura	20	154	7.7

=== Assists ===
Rk	Name	Team	Games	Assists	APG
1	(Spain) Anna Gómez	Valencia Basket	26	159	6.1
2	(Spain) Gaby Ocete	Nissan Al-Qázeres Extremadura	26	148	5.7
3	(Spain) Laia Palau	Spar CityLift Girona	25	133	5.3
4	(Spain) Silvia Domínguez	Perfumerías Avenida	24	108	4.5
5	(United States) Blake Dietrick	Lointek Gernika Bizkaia	15	65	4.3

=== Performance Index Rating ===
Rk	Name	Team	Games	Rating	PIR
1	(Mali) Mariam Coulibaly	Snatt's Femení Sant Adrià	25	426	17
2	(United States) Lyndra Weaver	IDK Gipuzkoa	23	371	16.1
3	(Nigeria) Atonye Nyingifa	Durán Maquinaria Ensino	26	416	16
4	(Paraguay) Paola Ferrari	Nissan Al-Qázeres Extremadura	26	400	15.4
5	(United States) Ariel Edwards	RPK Araski	26	398	15.3

== Spanish clubs in European competitions ==
Club	Competition	Progress
Perfumerías Avenida	EuroLeague	Regular season
Perfumerías Avenida	EuroCup	Quarterfinals
Spar CityLift Girona	EuroCup	Semifinals
Lointek Gernika Bizkaia	EuroCup	Play-off round 1
