= 2017–18 Liga Femenina de Baloncesto =

Liga Dia^{1}
- Season: 2017–18
- Games played: 182 (Regular season); 11 (Playoffs)
- Teams: 14
- TV partner(s): Teledeporte; Canal FEB (streaming)

Regular season
- Relegated: Campus Promete LF1; Movistar Estudiantes

Finals
- Champions: Perfumerías Avenida (6th title)
- Runners-up: Spar CityLift Girona
- Semifinalists: Mann-Filter; Star Center–Uni Ferrol

Statistical leaders
Points	(United States) Shayla Cooper	19.00
Rebounds	(Jamaica) Vanessa Gidden	13.11
Assists	(Spain) Gaby Ocete	5.19
Index Rating	(United States) Shacobia Barbee	18.77

Records
- Biggest home win: Gernika 101–51 Estudiantes (21 October 2017)
- Biggest away win: Sant Adrià 48–91 Avenida (29 October 2017)
- Highest scoring: Uni Ferrol 110–65 El Pastor (31 March 2018)
- Winning streak: 21 games Perfumerías Avenida
- Losing streak: 23 games Movistar Estudiantes
- ^{1} Sponsored league name, referring to Dia.

The 2017–18 Liga Femenina de Baloncesto, also known as Liga Dia for sponsorship reasons, is the 55th season of the Spanish basketball women's league. It started on 30 September 2017 with the first round of the regular season and ended in April 2018 with the final.

== Teams ==
=== Promotion and relegation (pre-season) ===
A total of 14 teams contest the league, including 12 sides from the 2016–17 season and two promoted from the 2016–17 Liga Femenina 2.

Teams promoted from Liga Femenina 2

- Snatt's Femení Sant Adrià
- Movistar Estudiantes

=== Venues and locations ===
Location of teams in 2017–18 Liga DIA

Team	Home city	Arena
Cadí La Seu	La Seu d'Urgell	Palau d'Esports
Campus Promete LF1	Logroño	Lobete
Embutidos Pajariel Bembibre PDM	Bembibre	Bembibre Arena
IDK Gipuzkoa	San Sebastián	José Antonio Gasca
Lacturale Art Araski	Vitoria-Gasteiz	Mendizorrotza
Lointek Gernika Bizkaia	Gernika	Maloste
Mann-Filter	Zaragoza	Eduardo Lastrada
Movistar Estudiantes	Madrid	Magariños
Nissan Al-Qázeres Extremadura	Cáceres	Juan Serrano Macayo
Perfumerías Avenida	Salamanca	Würzburg
Quesos El Pastor	Zamora	Ángel Nieto
Spar CityLift Girona	Girona	Fontajau
Snatt's Femení Sant Adrià	Sant Adrià de Besòs	Marina Besòs
Star Center–Uni Ferrol	Ferrol	Esteiro

== Regular season ==
=== League table ===
Pos	Team	Pld	W	L	PF	PA	PD	Pts	Qualification or relegation
1	Perfumerías Avenida	26	25	1	1973	1467	+506	51	Qualification to semi-finals
2	Spar CityLift Girona	26	23	3	2036	1610	+426	49	Qualification to semi-finals
3	Mann-Filter	26	19	7	1888	1710	+178	45	Qualification to quarter-finals
4	Star Center–Uni Ferrol	26	19	7	1900	1758	+142	45	Qualification to quarter-finals
5	Lointek Gernika Bizkaia	26	14	12	1923	1803	+120	40	Qualification to quarter-finals
6	IDK Gipuzkoa	26	14	12	1702	1692	+10	40	Qualification to quarter-finals
7	Cadí La Seu	26	13	13	1822	1745	+77	39	
8	Snatt's Femení Sant Adrià	26	12	14	1769	1826	−57	38	
9	Nissan Al-Qázeres Extremadura	26	10	16	1754	1864	−110	36	
10	Lacturale Art Araski	26	10	16	1642	1841	−199	36	
11	Embutidos Pajariel Bembibre PDM	26	9	17	1693	1831	−138	35	
12	Quesos El Pastor	26	6	20	1687	2010	−323	32	
13	Campus Promete LF1	26	6	20	1638	1871	−233	32	Relegation to LF 2
14	Movistar Estudiantes	26	2	24	1613	2012	−399	28	Relegation to LF 2

Source: Liga Femenina

=== Positions by round ===
The table lists the positions of teams after completion of each round.

Team \ Round	1	2	3	4	5	6	7	8	9	10	11	12	13	14	15	16	17	18	19	20	21	22	23	24	25	26	F
Perfumerías Avenida	2	1	1	1	1	1	1	1	1	1	1	1	1	1	1	1	1	1	1	1	1	1	1	1	1	1	1
Spar CityLift Girona	3	2	6	3	2	2	4	2	2	2	2	2	2	2	2	2	2	2	2	2	2	2	2	2	2	2	2
Mann-Filter	10	6	5	7	6	5	3	5	4	5	4	4	4	4	4	4	3	3	3	3	3	3	3	3	3	3	3
Star Center–Uni Ferrol	5	3	3	4	4	4	5	4	3	3	3	3	3	3	3	3	4	4	4	4	4	4	4	4	4	4	4
Lointek Gernika Bizkaia	9	7	9	8	5	6	6	8	9	8	9	7	7	5	5	6	5	5	6	6	6	7	6	6	5	5	5
IDK Gipuzkoa	7	4	2	2	3	3	2	3	5	6	7	5	5	7	6	5	6	6	5	5	5	5	5	5	6	6	6
Cadí La Seu	8	5	4	6	10	7	9	10	10	11	10	8	8	8	8	8	8	7	7	7	7	6	7	7	7	7	7
Snatt's Femení Sant Adrià	6	8	7	10	8	10	8	7	6	4	5	6	6	6	7	7	7	8	8	8	10	8	8	8	8	8	8
Nissan Al-Qázeres Extremadura	1	9	10	9	7	8	7	6	7	9	6	9	9	9	9	9	9	9	9	10	8	10	9	9	9	9	9
Lacturale Art Araski	4	10	8	5	9	9	10	9	8	7	8	10	10	10	10	10	10	10	10	11	11	11	11	10	10	10	10
Embutidos Pajariel Bembibre PDM	12	11	11	12	11	11	11	11	11	10	11	11	11	11	11	11	11	11	11	9	9	9	10	11	11	11	11
Quesos El Pastor	11	12	13	11	12	12	12	13	13	13	12	13	13	12	12	12	12	12	12	12	12	12	12	12	12	12	12
Campus Promete LF1	14	14	14	14	13	13	13	12	12	12	13	12	12	13	13	13	13	13	13	13	13	13	13	13	13	13	13
Movistar Estudiantes	13	13	12	13	14	14	14	14	14	14	14	14	14	14	14	14	14	14	14	14	14	14	14	14	14	14	14

Leader
Copa de la Reina and Playoffs semifinals berth
Copa de la Reina and Playoffs berth
FIBA Europe competitions
Relegation to Liga Femenina 2

=== Results ===
Home \ Away	CAD	CAM	BEM	GIP	ARA	GER	MAN	EST	ALQ	AVE	ZAM	GIR	STA	UNI
Cadí La Seu		79–53	62–66	58–54	80–61	60–65	59–76	83–74	70–39	48–64	68–51	63–76	62–69	85–77
Campus Promete LF1	68–77		51–53	81–57	59–47	78–69	67–86	68–62	55–83	72–73	56–59	58–71	80–81	52–66
Embutidos Pajariel Bembibre PDM	85–79	74–53		47–70	68–55	77–78	59–87	72–63	74–61	59–85	81–66	67–87	56–59	56–66
IDK Gipuzkoa	72–68	75–58	58–64		57–61	65–74	58–63	66–63	67–57	58–80	64–40	72–66	80–58	64–79
Lacturale Art Araski	65–77	66–57	72–63	62–86		73–62	69–78	71–60	70–58	49–72	63–54	53–88	65–74	75–81
Lointek Gernika Bizkaia	89–75	62–70	82–62	76–55	53–59		68–75	101–51	90–44	60–77	78–58	67–79	73–80	89–82
Mann-Filter	64–58	84–64	81–70	68–77	79–55	90–69		84–56	72–59	39–64	83–55	59–74	69–75	75–65
Movistar Estudiantes	60–92	55–70	68–57	57–68	59–73	69–70	63–81		75–87	60–99	76–64	71–84	69–77	59–75
Nissan Al-Qázeres Extremadura	68–79	92–67	72–59	45–64	88–76	54–85	63–67	71–61		52–83	83–72	84–89	90–78	53–43
Perfumerías Avenida	75–71	80–51	77–65	77–59	69–54	75–55	71–37	82–58	74–65		79–56	76–53	75–65	50–54
Quesos El Pastor	66–74	80–73	77–71	71–75	76–77	77–88	74–81	87–64	78–76	50–88		52–78	82–81	67–71
Spar CityLift Girona	72–60	74–52	71–53	89–60	87–50	80–70	80–68	91–47	74–60	61–66	89–50		76–69	72–54
Snatt's Femení Sant Adrià	59–73	91–71	69–66	59–64	78–47	52–68	52–61	66–50	67–79	48–91	83–60	61–85		56–64
Star Center–Uni Ferrol	77–62	75–54	82–69	71–61	78–74	86–82	90–81	73–63	75–71	68–71	110–65	68–90	70–62	

Legend: Blue = home team win; Yellow = draw; Red = away team win.

== Playoffs ==
Quarterfinals
4	Star Center–Uni Ferrol	75	74
5	Lointek Gernika Bizkaia	57	72
3	Mann-Filter	51	62	73
6	IDK Gipuzkoa	55	58	62

Semifinals
1	Perfumerías Avenida	95	92
4	Star Center–Uni Ferrol	56	59
2	Spar CityLift Girona	87	57
3	Mann-Filter	64	44

Finals
1	Perfumerías Avenida	71	77
2	Spar CityLift Girona	70	61

=== Quarterfinals ===
==== (4) Star Center–Uni Ferrol vs. (5) Lointek Gernika Bizkaia ====
5 April 2018	Star Center–Uni Ferrol	75–57 (Series: 1–0)	Lointek Gernika Bizkaia	Ferrol
20:00	Scoring by quarter: 25–15, 16–14, 20–13, 14–15
	Pts: Weisner, Prince 19; Rebs: Araújo 16; Asts: Delgado 7 PIR: Weisner 27	Boxscore	Pts: Pina 14; Rebs: Caldwell 7 Asts: Pina 3 PIR: Caldwell 10	Arena: Esteiro; Referees: Pagán Baró, Aresté Giralt

8 April 2018	Lointek Gernika Bizkaia	72–74(OT) (Series: 0–2)	Star Center–Uni Ferrol	Gernika
19:00	Scoring by quarter: 11–13, 26–15, 15–18, 16–22, Overtime: 4–6
	Pts: Caldwell 16; Rebs: Gómez, Caldwell 8 Asts: Gómez 9 PIR: Caldwell 26	Boxscore	Pts: Prince 24; Rebs: Weisner 11; Asts: Araújo 5 PIR: Prince 21	Arena: Maloste; Referees: Zafra Guerra, Pérez Santana

==== (3) Mann-Filter vs. (6) IDK Gipuzkoa ====
5 April 2018	Mann-Filter	51–55 (Series: 0–1)	IDK Gipuzkoa	Zaragoza
21:00	Scoring by quarter: 13–13, 14–13, 10–20, 14–9
	Pts: Barbee 16; Rebs: Pascua 10; Asts: Ocete 5 PIR: Barbee 19	Boxscore	Pts: Weaver 19; Rebs: Sarr 12; Asts: Aduriz 4 PIR: Sarr 18	Arena: Eduardo Lastrada; Referees: Baena Arroyo, Alcaraz Moreno

8 April 2017	IDK Gipuzkoa	58–62 (Series: 1–1)	Mann-Filter	San Sebastián
20:00	Scoring by quarter: 12–11, 15–10, 8–25, 23–16
	Pts: Alleyne 12; Rebs: Weaver 9 Asts: González 6 PIR: Alleyne 20	Boxscore	Pts: Ferrari 18; Rebs: Pascua 17; Asts: Ocete 5 PIR: Pascua 25	Arena: José Antonio Gasca; Referees: Morales Ruiz, Langa de Martín

12 April 2018	Mann-Filter	73–62 (Series: 2–1)	IDK Gipuzkoa	Zaragoza
21:00	Scoring by quarter: 24–22, 20–17, 12–15, 17–8
	Pts: Ferrari 29; Rebs: Pascua 8 Asts: Ocete 7 PIR: Ferrari 33	Boxscore	Pts: Sarr 13; Rebs: Brkić 6 Asts: Brkić 3 PIR: Sarr 13	Arena: Eduardo Lastrada; Referees: De Lucas de Lucas, Merino Campos

=== Semifinals ===
==== (1) Perfumerías Avenida vs. (4) Star Center–Uni Ferrol ====
14 April 2018	Perfumerías Avenida	95–56 (Series: 1–0)	Star Center–Uni Ferrol	Salamanca
19:00	Scoring by quarter: 28–18, 19–17, 25–13, 23–8
	Pts: Elonu 14; Rebs: Robinson 9 Asts: Domínguez 8 PIR: Domínguez 24	Boxscore	Pts: Prince 18; Rebs: Araújo 6 Asts: Sánchez, Araújo 2 PIR: Weisner 18	Arena: Würzburg; Referees: Quintas Álvarez, Peláez Santana

18 April 2018	Star Center–Uni Ferrol	59–92 (Series: 0–2)	Perfumerías Avenida	Ferrol
21:00	Scoring by quarter: 17–21, 8–23, 6–26, 28–22
	Pts: Prince 20; Rebs: Weisner 7 Asts: Araújo 7 PIR: Weisner 21	Boxscore	Pts: Robinson, De Souza 18; Rebs: Robinson 8 Asts: Robinson, Elonu, Nicholls 3 PIR: De Souza 24	Arena: Esteiro; Referees: Bravo Loroño, Alcaraz Moreno

==== (2) Spar CityLift Girona vs. (3) Mann-Filter ====
15 April 2018	Spar CityLift Girona	87–64 (Series: 1–0)	Mann-Filter	Girona
19:00	Scoring by quarter: 24–18, 19–17, 21–12, 23–17
	Pts: Mendi 15; Rebs: Colhado 8 Asts: Martínez, Buch 5 PIR: Evans 22	Boxscore	Pts: Abalde, Ferrari 15; Rebs: Lahuerta, Gimeno 5 Asts: Ferrari, Lahuerta 4 PIR: Ferrari 13	Arena: Fontajau; Referees: López Herrada, Sánchez Benito

19 April 2018	Mann-Filter	44–57 (Series: 0–2)	Spar CityLift Girona	Zaragoza
21:00	Scoring by quarter: 11–12, 14–15, 5–16, 14–14
	Pts: Barbee 13; Rebs: Gimeno 7 Asts: Ocete, Ferrari 3 PIR: Barbee 11	Boxscore	Pts: Colhado 12; Rebs: Mendi 15; Asts: Martínez, Mendi 3 PIR: Colhado 19	Arena: Eduardo Lastrada; Referees: García León, Langa de Martín

=== Final ===
==== (1) Perfumerías Avenida vs. (2) Spar CityLift Girona ====
26 April 2018	Perfumerías Avenida	71–70 (Series: 1–0)	Spar CityLift Girona	Salamanca
21:00	Scoring by quarter: 19–14, 22–16, 11–16, 19–24
	Pts: Robinson 17; Rebs: De Souza, Givens 7 Asts: Domínguez 6 PIR: Robinson 22	Boxscore	Pts: Conde 20; Rebs: Colhado 10; Asts: Mendi, Martínez 3 PIR: Conde 21	Arena: Würzburg; Referees: Morales García-Alcaide, Ríos Marcos, Peláez Santana

29 April 2018	Spar CityLift Girona	61–77 (Series: 0–2)	Perfumerías Avenida	Girona
19:00	Scoring by quarter: 21–18, 11–26, 17–20, 12–13
	Pts: Colhado 12; Rebs: Mendi, Colhado 7 Asts: Martínez 7 PIR: Colhado 15	Boxscore	Pts: De Souza 18; Rebs: De Souza 10; Asts: Domínguez 5 PIR: De Souza 25	Arena: Fontajau; Referees: De Lucas de Lucas, Caamaño Muñoz, Areste Giralt

== Stats leaders in regular season ==
=== Points ===
Rk	Name	Team	Games	Points	PPG
1	(United States) Shayla Cooper	Nissan Al-Qázeres Extremadura	16	304	19.0
2	(Paraguay) Paola Ferrari	Mann-Filter	26	489	18.8
3	(United States) Brittany Brown	Embutidos Pajariel Bembibre PDM	26	417	16.0
4	(United States) Lyndra Weaver	IDK Gipuzkoa	26	407	15.6
5	(United States) Alexis Prince	Star Center–Uni Ferrol	26	404	15.5

=== Rebounds ===
Rk	Name	Team	Games	Rebounds	RPG
1	(Jamaica) Vanessa Gidden	Campus Promete LF1	19	249	13.1
2	(United States) Jillian Alleyne	IDK Gipuzkoa	22	213	9.7
3	(United States) Alisia Jenkins	Quesos El Pastor	18	173	9.6
4	(United States) Talia Caldwell	Lointek Gernika Bizkaia	19	175	9.2
5	(United States) Joy Brown	Nissan Al-Qázeres Extremadura	26	238	9.1

=== Assists ===
Rk	Name	Team	Games	Assists	APG
1	(Spain) Gaby Ocete	Mann-Filter	26	135	5.2
2	(Serbia) Aleksandra Stanaćev	Embutidos Pajariel Bembibre PDM	26	125	4.8
3	(Spain) Nuria Martínez	Spar CityLift Girona	25	107	4.3
4	(Croatia) Iva Brkić	IDK Gipuzkoa	26	102	3.9
4	(Paraguay) Paola Ferrari	Mann-Filter	26	102	3.9

=== Performance Index Rating ===
Rk	Name	Team	Games	Rating	PIR
1	(United States) Shacobia Barbee	Mann-Filter	26	488	18.8
2	(United States) Shayla Cooper	Nissan Al-Qázeres Extremadura	16	299	18.7
3	(Jamaica) Vanessa Gidden	Campus Promete LF1	19	349	18.4
4	(Spain) María Araújo	Star Center–Uni Ferrol	26	449	17.3
5	(United States) Angel Robinson	Perfumerías Avenida	23	385	16.7
