= 2016–17 Liga Femenina de Baloncesto =

Liga Femenina
- Season: 2016–17
- Duration: September 2015–April 2016
- Games played: 182 (Regular season); 14–21 (Playoffs)
- Teams: 14
- TV partner(s): FEBtv.com (streaming)

Regular season
- Season MVP: (Brazil) Nádia Colhado

Finals
- Champions: Perfumerías Avenida (5th title)
- Runners-up: Spar CityLift Girona

Statistical leaders
- Points: (United States) Roneeka Hodges
- Rebounds: (United States) Julia Forster
- Assists: (Paraguay) Paola Ferrari
- Index Rating: (Brazil) Nádia Colhado

The 2016–17 Liga Femenina de Baloncesto is the 54th edition of the Spanish premier women's basketball championship. Regular season will start on 28 September 2016 and will finish on 1 April 2017. Playoffs will be played between 5 April and 3 May 2017.

== Competition format ==
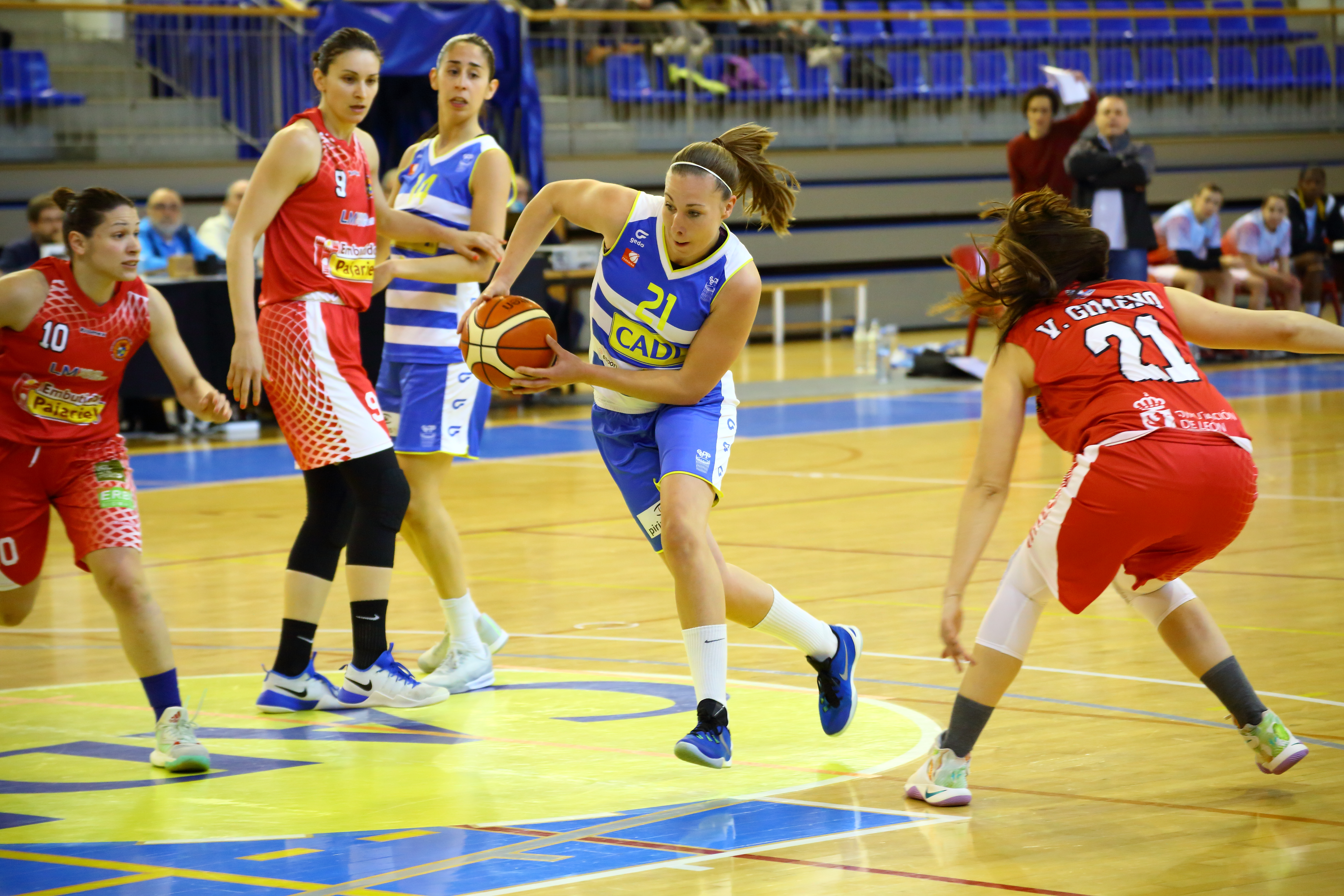
Cadí La Seu–Bembibre.

All the 14 teams play the regular season, consisted in a home and away round-robin. At the end of the regular season, the four first teams qualify for the playoffs, on a best of three series. The two last qualified teams are relegated to Liga Femenina 2.

At the end of the regular season, the two first teams will directly qualify to semifinals, while teams between third and sixth join the quarterfinals stage.

The two last qualified teams will be relegated to Liga Femenina 2.

=== Copa de la Reina ===
For the Copa de la Reina, initially was confirmed a format similar to the previous years, the first three qualified teams at the end of the first half of the season and another one qualified as host would play the Cup in a Final Four format, to be played on 11 and 12 February 2017.

However, on 15 November 2016, the Spanish Basketball Federation expanded the competition to the first six qualified teams at the half of the season. The two best teams will qualify directly to the semifinals while the other four teams will join the competition in the round of quarterfinals.

== Participating clubs ==
At the end of the 2015–16 season, Spar Gran Canaria and Añares Rioja ISB were relegated to Liga Femenina 2. Likewise, Lacturale Araski and Al-Qázeres Extremadura promoted from this league as champion and runner-up respectively.

As Conquero Huelva Wagen finally was not admitted in the league, the Spanish Basketball Federation invited Spar Gran Canaria to occupy its place.

Location of teams in 2016–17 Liga Femenina
Location of teams from the Canary Islands in 2016–17 Liga Femenina (Canary Islands)

Team	City	Arena	2015–16
Perfumerías Avenida	Salamanca	Würzburg	1st
Spar CityLift Girona	Girona	Fontajau	2nd
Mann-Filter	Zaragoza	Eduardo Lastrada	4th
Cadí La Seu	La Seu d'Urgell	Palau d'Esports	5th
Lointek Gernika Bizkaia	Gernika	Maloste	6th
CREF ¡Hola!	Madrid	Canal de Isabel II	7th
Embutidos Pajariel Bembibre	Bembibre	Bembibre Arena	8th
Quesos El Pastor	Zamora	Ángel Nieto	9th
IDK Gipuzkoa	San Sebastián	José Antonio Gasca	10th
Star Center–Uni Ferrol	Ferrol	Esteiro	11th
Campus Promete	Logroño	Lobete	12th
Spar Gran Canaria	Las Palmas	Centro Insular de Deportes	13th
Lacturales Araski	Vitoria-Gasteiz	Mendizorrotza	1st (LF2)
Al-Qázeres Extremadura	Cáceres	Juan Serrano Macayo	2nd (LF2)

== Regular season ==
=== League table ===
Pos	Team	Pld	W	L	PF	PA	PD	Pts	Qualification or relegation
1	Perfumerías Avenida	26	25	1	1889	1452	+437	51	Qualification to semifinals
2	Spar CityLift Girona	26	21	5	1978	1651	+327	47	Qualification to semifinals
3	Lointek Gernika Bizkaia	26	16	10	1696	1528	+168	42	Qualification to quarterfinals
4	Star Center–Uni Ferrol	26	15	11	1742	1801	−59	41	Qualification to quarterfinals
5	IDK Gipuzkoa	26	14	12	1743	1728	+15	40	Qualification to quarterfinals
6	Lacturale Araski	26	13	13	1634	1735	−101	39	Qualification to quarterfinals
7	Campus Promete	26	13	13	1792	1787	+5	39	
8	Cadí La Seu	26	13	13	1662	1655	+7	39	
9	Al-Qázeres Extremadura	26	11	15	1755	1802	−47	37	
10	Embutidos Pajariel Bembibre	26	10	16	1682	1770	−88	36	
11	Mann-Filter	26	10	16	1706	1771	−65	36	
12	Quesos El Pastor	26	9	17	1666	1770	−104	35	
13	CREF ¡Hola!	26	7	19	1603	1859	−256	33	Relegation to LF 2
14	Spar Gran Canaria	26	5	21	1619	1858	−239	31	Relegation to LF 2

Source: Liga Femenina

=== Positions by round ===
The table lists the positions of teams after completion of each round.

Team \ Round	1	2	3	4	5	6	7	8	9	10	11	12	13	14	15	16	17	18	19	20	21	22	23	24	25	26	F
Perfumerias Avenida	2	2	1	1	1	2	2	2	2	1	1	1	1	1	1	1	1	1	1	1	1	1	1	1	1	1	1
Spar CityLift Girona	3	1	2	2	2	1	1	1	1	2	2	2	2	2	2	2	2	2	2	2	2	2	2	2	2	2	2
Star Center-Uni Ferrol	7	11	10	8	6	7	9	10	12	10	10	7	6	6	7	8	7	7	6	6	6	5	5	4	4	4	3
Lacturale Araski	4	10	7	7	5	5	4	4	4	4	4	4	4	4	4	4	5	5	5	5	4	4	4	5	5	6	4
Lointek Gernika Bizkaia	10	5	3	3	3	3	3	3	3	3	3	3	3	3	3	3	3	3	3	3	3	3	3	3	3	3	5
IDK Gipuzkoa	6	7	11	13	13	10	10	9	9	8	7	10	11	8	10	10	10	10	7	7	8	9	8	8	7	5	6
Campus Promete	8	12	12	10	8	6	7	8	8	11	11	8	10	9	6	5	4	4	4	4	5	6	6	7	8	7	7
Cadí La Seu	13	8	6	5	9	9	8	7	5	6	6	5	8	11	9	9	9	8	11	9	7	7	7	6	6	8	8
Al-Qázeres Extremadura	5	3	8	9	7	8	6	5	6	7	8	6	5	5	5	6	6	6	8	10	10	10	10	9	9	9	9
Embutidos Pajariel Bembibre	9	4	4	4	4	4	5	6	7	5	5	9	7	7	11	11	11	11	10	11	11	11	11	11	11	10	10
Mann-Filter	12	14	13	11	11	11	12	11	11	9	9	11	9	10	8	7	8	9	9	8	9	8	9	10	10	11	11
Quesos El Pastor	1	9	9	12	12	13	11	13	10	12	12	12	12	12	12	12	12	12	12	12	12	12	12	12	12	12	12
CREF ¡Hola!	11	6	5	6	10	12	13	12	13	13	13	13	13	13	14	13	13	13	13	13	13	13	13	13	13	13	13
Spar Gran Canaria	14	13	14	14	14	14	14	14	14	14	14	14	14	14	13	14	14	14	14	14	14	14	14	14	14	14	14

Leader
Copa de la Reina and Playoffs semifinals berth
Copa de la Reina and Playoffs berth
FIBA Europe competitions
Relegation to Liga Femenina 2

== Playoffs ==
Quarterfinals
4	Star Center–Uni Ferrol	68	59	59
5	IDK Gipuzkoa	60	61	56
3	Lointek Gernika Bizkaia	61	54
6	Lacturale Araski	64	57

Semifinals
1	Perfumerías Avenida	69	61
4	Star Center–Uni Ferrol	45	39
2	Spar CityLift Girona	80	61
6	Lacturale Araski	51	43

Finals
1	Perfumerías Avenida	71	75	67
2	Spar CityLift Girona	51	79	46

=== Quarterfinals ===
==== (4) Star Center–Uni Ferrol vs. (5) IDK Gipuzkoa ====
5 April 2017	Star Center–Uni Ferrol	68–60 (Series: 1–0)	IDK Gipuzkoa	Ferrol
20:00	Scoring by quarter: 19–10, 18–15, 16–21, 15–14
	Pts: Sánchez 16; Rebs: Barbee 12; Asts: Suárez, Sánchez, Barbee 4 PIR: Barbee 29	Boxscore	Pts: Colhado 17; Rebs: Colhado 14; Asts: Ferrari 6 PIR: Colhado 27	Arena: Esteiro; Referees: De Lucas de Lucas, Aresté Giralt

9 April 2017	IDK Gipuzkoa	61–59 (Series: 1–1)	Star Center–Uni Ferrol	San Sebastián
12:00	Scoring by quarter: 8–22, 19–15, 19–11, 15–11
	Pts: Aduriz 14; Rebs: Bulgak, Sarr 7 Asts: Ocete 7 PIR: Aduriz 19	Boxscore	Pts: Sánchez 20; Rebs: Sánchez 12; Asts: Suárez 7 PIR: Sánchez 31	Arena: José Antonio Gasca; Referees: Zafra Guerra, López Herrada

12 April 2017	Star Center–Uni Ferrol	59–56 (Series: 2–1)	IDK Gipuzkoa	Ferrol
20:00	Scoring by quarter: 14–16, 11–11, 9–17, 25–12
	Pts: Barbee 17; Rebs: Sánchez, Pérez, Barbee 9 Asts: Sánchez 4 PIR: Sánchez 20	Boxscore	Pts: Bulgak 20; Rebs: Bulgak 17; Asts: Ocete 6 PIR: Bulgak 28	Arena: Esteiro; Referees: Muñoz García, Pinela García

==== (3) Lointek Gernika Bizkaia vs. (6) Lacturale Araski ====
5 April 2017	Lointek Gernika Bizkaia	61–64 (Series: 0–1)	Lacturale Araski	Gernika
20:00	Scoring by quarter: 21–14, 9–21, 19–12, 12–17
	Pts: Pina 17; Rebs: Pina 11; Asts: Asurmendi 6 PIR: Pina 21	Boxscore	Pts: Tudanca 23; Rebs: Tudanca 7 Asts: Vega 4 PIR: Tudanca 21	Arena: Maloste; Referees: Pagán Baró, Baena Arroyo

8 April 2017	Lacturale Araski	57–54 (Series: 2–0)	Lointek Gernika Bizkaia	Vitoria-Gasteiz
19:30	Scoring by quarter: 12–16, 17–12, 15–10, 13–16
	Pts: Silva, Roundtree 13; Rebs: Tudanca, Roundtree 8 Asts: Silva 4 PIR: Silva 19	Boxscore	Pts: Mokango 13; Rebs: Mokango 15; Asts: Pina 3 PIR: Mokango 15	Arena: Mendizorrotza; Referees: Mendoza Holgado, Hurtado Almansa

=== Semifinals ===
==== (1) Perfumerías Avenida vs. (4) Star Center–Uni Ferrol ====
14 April 2017	Perfumerías Avenida	69–45 (Series: 1–0)	Star Center–Uni Ferrol	Salamanca
21:00	Scoring by quarter: 17–8, 16–11, 19–18, 17–8
Teledeporte	Pts: Givens 20; Rebs: De Souza 9 Asts: Domínguez, Milovanović 6 PIR: Givens 21	Boxscore	Pts: Barbee 12; Rebs: Sánchez 8 Asts: Barbee 3 PIR: Sánchez 22	Arena: Würzburg; Referees: García León, Torres Sánchez

18 April 2017	Star Center–Uni Ferrol	39–61 (Series: 0–2)	Perfumerías Avenida	Ferrol
21:00	Scoring by quarter: 12–20, 11–12, 8–14, 8–15
Teledeporte	Pts: Jefferson 10; Rebs: Pérez 11; Asts: Barbee 4 PIR: Pérez, Barbee 11	Boxscore	Pts: Milovanović 13; Rebs: De Souza 9 Asts: Domínguez 5 PIR: De Souza 18	Arena: Esteiro; Referees: Zamora Rodríguez, Padrós Feliu

==== (2) Spar CityLift Girona vs. (6) Lacturale Araski ====
15 April 2017	Spar CityLift Girona	80–51 (Series: 1–0)	Lacturale Araski	Girona
20:00	Scoring by quarter: 23–14, 19–13, 19–9, 19–15
Teledeporte	Pts: Jordana 21; Rebs: Spanou 13; Asts: Buch 6 PIR: Coulibaly 33	Boxscore	Pts: Tudanca 15; Rebs: Liñeira 7 Asts: Liñeira 3 PIR: Liñeira 12	Arena: Fontajau; Referees: Gómez López, González Cuervo

19 April 2017	Lacturale Araski	43–61 (Series: 0–2)	Spar CityLift Girona	Vitoria-Gasteiz
21:00	Scoring by quarter: 9–17, 17–14, 7–10, 10–20
Teledeporte	Pts: Aldalur 9 Rebs: Velasco, Vega, Silva 4 Asts: Velasco, Silva 4 PIR: Silva 9	Boxscore	Pts: Rodríguez 14; Rebs: Coulibaly 13; Asts: Jordana 4 PIR: Coulibaly 21	Arena: Mendizorrotza; Referees: Carpallo Miguélez, Aranzana García

=== Final ===
==== (1) Perfumerías Avenida vs. (2) Spar CityLift Girona ====
26 April 2017	Perfumerías Avenida	71–51	Spar CityLift Girona	Salamanca
21:00	Scoring by quarter: 13–14, 17–14, 25–13, 16–10
Teledeporte	Pts: Milovanović 30; Rebs: De Souza 8 Asts: Givens 7 PIR: Milovanović 35	Boxscore	Pts: Ibekwe 20; Rebs: Ibekwe 11; Asts: Jordana, Ibekwe 2 PIR: Ibekwe 19	Arena: Würzburg; Referees: Uruñuela Uruñuela, Olivares Iglesias

29 April 2017	Spar CityLift Girona	79–75	Perfumerías Avenida	Girona
21:00	Scoring by quarter: 18–18, 21–21, 19–16, 21–20
Teledeporte	Pts: Ibekwe 24; Rebs: Ibekwe 8 Asts: Jordana 8 PIR: Ibekwe 38	Boxscore	Pts: Domínguez 20; Rebs: De Souza 9 Asts: Domínguez, Givens 2 PIR: Domínguez 19	Arena: Fontajau; Referees: Terreros San Miguel, García León

2 May 2017	Perfumerías Avenida	67–46 (Series: 2–1)	Spar CityLift Girona	Salamanca
21:00	Scoring by quarter: 15–7, 16–9, 23–17, 13–13
Teledeporte	Pts: Milovanović 20; Rebs: Milovanović 10; Asts: Domínguez 6 PIR: Milovanović 27	Boxscore	Pts: Coulibaly 9 Rebs: Ibekwe 9 Asts: Jordana, Ibekwe 3 PIR: Coulibaly 14	Arena: Würzburg; Referees: Morales Ruiz, Gómez López

== Stats leaders in regular season ==
=== Points ===
Rk	Name	Team	Games	Points	PPG
1	(United States) Roneeka Hodges	Mann-Filter	21	355	16.9
2	(Paraguay) Paola Ferrari	IDK Gipuzkoa	17	287	16.9
3	(United States) Amisha Carter	Lointek Gernika Bizkaia	19	317	16.7
4	(Brazil) Nádia Colhado	IDK Gipuzkoa	19	313	16.5
5	(United States) Ameryst Alston	Al-Qázeres Extremadura	25	402	16.1

=== Rebounds ===
Rk	Name	Team	Games	Rebounds	RPG
1	(United States) Julia Forster	Al-Qázeres Extremadura	26	300	11.5
2	(Mali) Mariam Coulibaly	Spar Gran Canaria	26	260	10.0
3	(Nigeria) Sarah Imovbioh	CREF ¡Hola!	26	251	9.6
4	(Brazil) Nádia Colhado	IDK Gipuzkoa	19	177	9.3
5	(Spain) María Araújo	Star Center–Uni Ferrol	26	230	8.8

=== Assists ===
Rk	Name	Team	Games	Assists	APG
1	(Paraguay) Paola Ferrari	IDK Gipuzkoa	17	90	5.3
2	(Spain) María Asurmendi	Lointek Gernika Bizkaia	26	120	4.6
3	(Spain) Gaby Ocete	IDK Gipuzkoa	25	111	4.4
4	(Serbia) Aleksandra Stanaćev	Embutidos Pajariel Bembibre	26	112	4.3
5	(Spain) Ana Suárez	Star Center–Uni Ferrol	19	75	3.9

=== Performance Index Rating ===
Rk	Name	Team	Games	Rating	PIR
1	(Brazil) Nádia Colhado	IDK Gipuzkoa	19	415	21.8
2	(United States) Amisha Carter	Lointek Gernika Bizkaia	19	411	21.6
3	(United States) Julia Forster	Al-Qázeres Extremadura	26	514	19.8
4	(United States) Shacobia Barbee	Star Center–Uni Ferrol	26	502	19.3
5	(Brazil) Érika de Souza	Perfumerias Avenida	16	294	18.4
