= Laura Quevedo =

Spanish basketball player

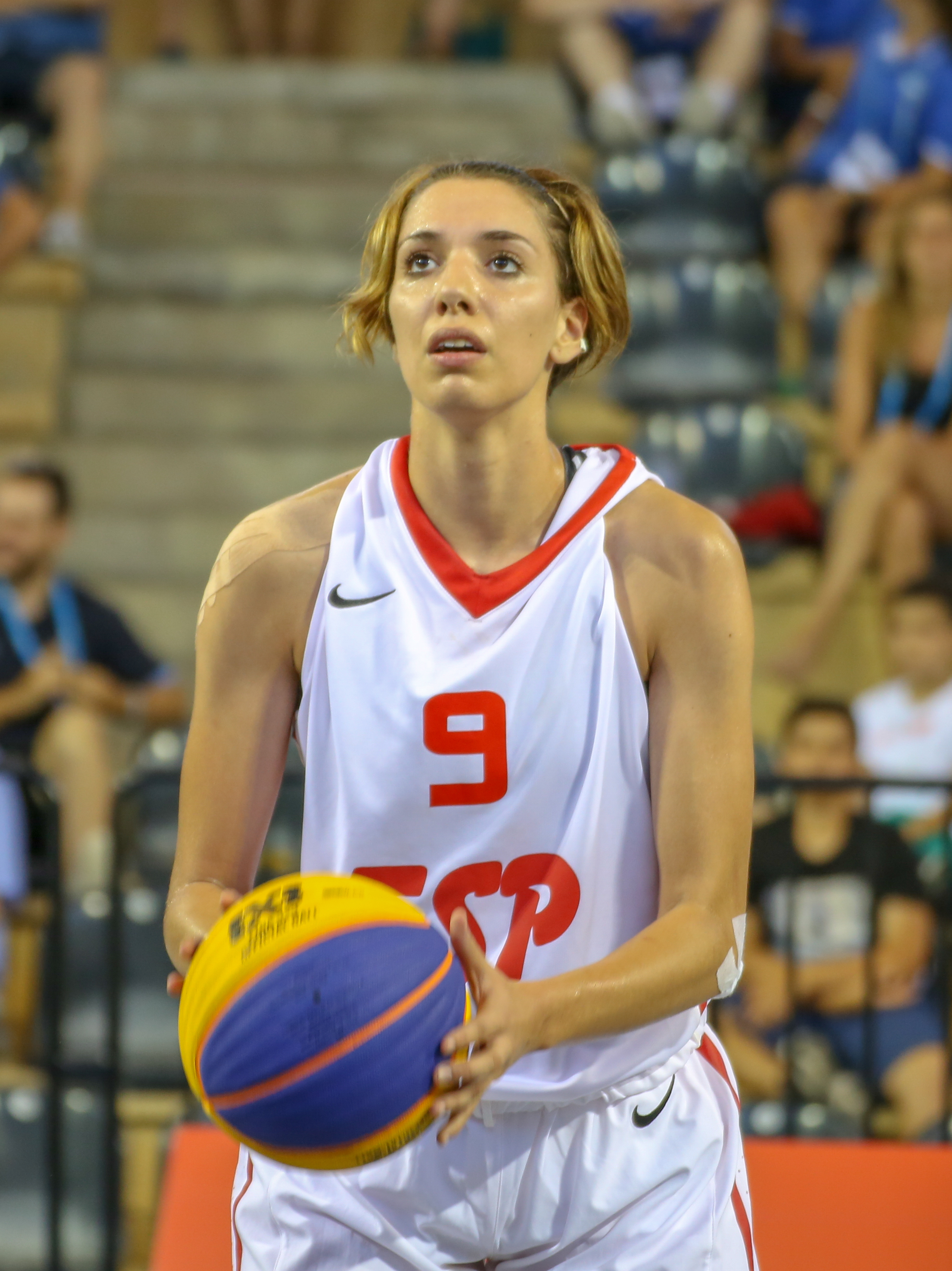

No. 9 – ASVEL
- Position: Forward
- League: Ligue Féminine de Basketball

Personal information
- Born: 15 April 1996 (age 30) Coslada, Madrid
- Listed height: 6 ft 1 in (1.85 m)

Career information
- Playing career: 2013–present

Career history
- 2008–2013: Real Canoe NC (youth)
- 2013–2014: Rivas Ecópolis
- 2014: Miami Hurricanes
- 2015: Pajariel Bembibre
- 2015–2016: Universitario de Ferrol
- 2016–2017: Perfumerías Avenida
- 2017–2018: CB Al-Qázeres
- 2018–2019: CD Zamarat
- 2019–2021: Araski AES
- 2021–2022: CB Estudiantes
- 2022–present: ASVEL Féminin

Career highlights
- 2× Spanish League champion (2014, 2017); Spanish Cup champion (2017)

Laura Quevedo Cañizares (Note: In this Spanish name, the first or paternal surname is Quevedo and the second or maternal family name is Cañizares.) (born 15 April 1996) is a Spanish basketball player for ASVEL Féminin of the Ligue Féminine de Basketball (LFB) and the Spanish national team, taking part in the 2016 Summer Olympics and the 2021 Eurobasket.

== Club career ==
Quevedo played as a child in local club CB Coslada from age 7 to 12, moving then to Real Canoe for five years. At 17, she signed for Rivas Ecópolis of the Spanish first tier league, alternating the youth and the senior team. At age 18, she moved to Florida, USA to play for college team Miami Hurricanes of the NCAA, where she averaged 22 MMP and 6 PPP, but after 15 games she decided to go back to Spain before the end of the season. Back in Spain, she played with Pajariel Bembibre for the remainer of the 2014-2015 season. After one season with Universitario de Ferrol, she signed in 2016 with the top team in the league, Perfumerías Avenida, winning the double league-cup in 2017. In December 2017 she transferred to CB Al-Qázeres in search of more playtime.

== National team ==
Quevedo started playing with Spain's youth teams at 16, winning a total of seven medals from 2012 to 2016. She made her debut with the senior team in 2015, when she was 19 years old. Up to 2021, she had 37 caps with 1.7 PPG, participating in the Rio 2016 Olympics and the 2021 Eurobasket:

- 2012 FIBA Europe Under-16 Championship (youth)
- 2012 FIBA Under-17 World Championship (youth)
- 2013 FIBA Europe Under-18 Championship (youth)
- 2014 FIBA Europe Under-20 Championship (youth)
- 2014 FIBA Europe Under-18 Championship (youth)
- 2015 FIBA Europe Under-20 Championship (youth)
- 2016 FIBA Europe Under-20 Championship (youth)
- 2016 Summer Olympics
- 2018 Mediterranean Games 3x3
- 7th 2021 Eurobasket
- 2023 Eurobasket
