= Laura Gil =

Spanish basketball player

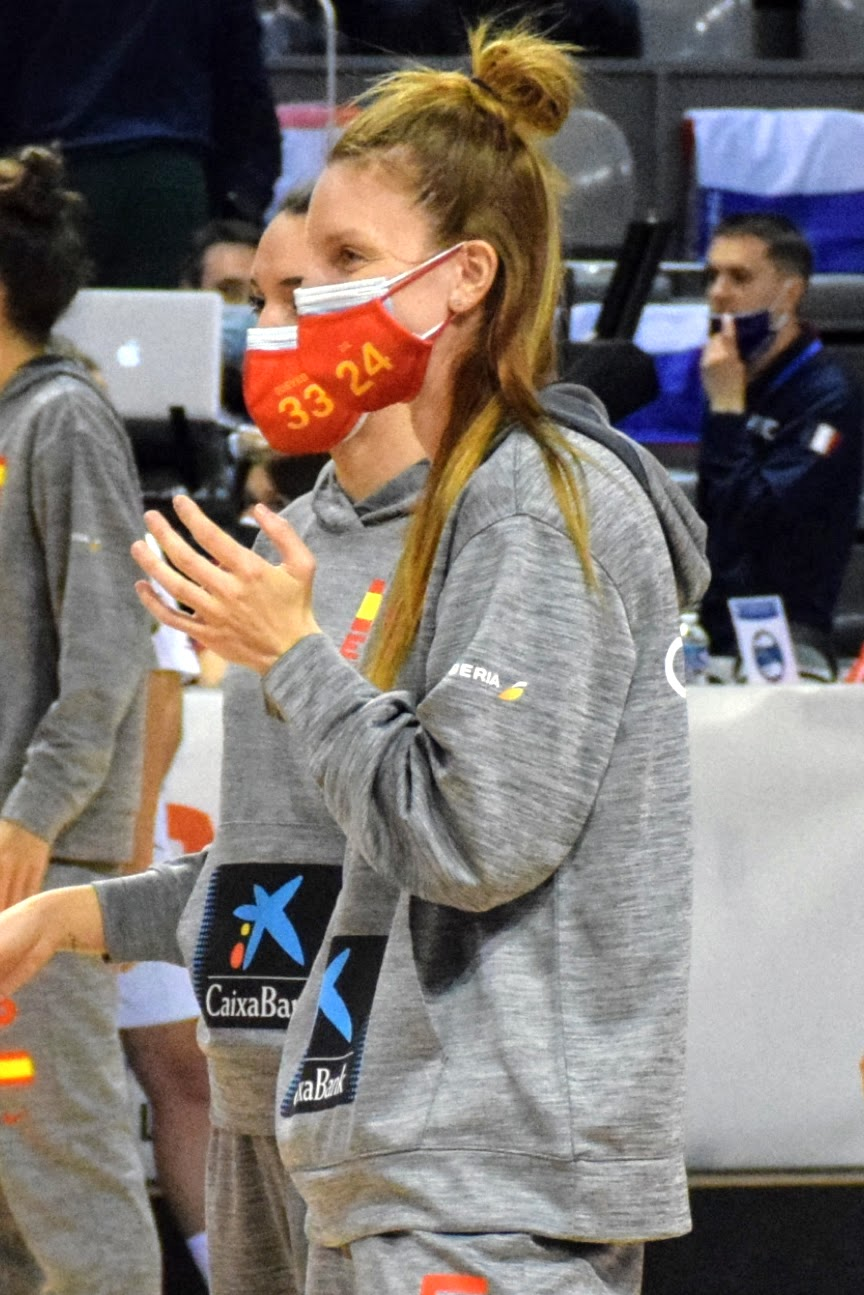

No. 15 – Valencia Basket
- Position: Power forward
- League: LFB

Personal information
- Born: 24 April 1992 (age 34) Murcia, Spain
- Listed height: 6 ft 3 in (1.91 m)
- Listed weight: 172 lb (78 kg)

Career information
- Playing career: 2008–present

Career history
- 2008–2010: Segle XXI (LF2)
- 2010–2011: Perfumerías Avenida
- 2011–2012: Hondarribia-Irún
- 2012–2013: CB Ciudad de Burgos
- 2013–2014: Rivas Ecópolis
- 2014–2016: Cadí La Seu
- 2016–2020: Perfumerías Avenida
- 2020-: Valencia Basket

Career highlights
- EuroLeague champion (2011); EuroCup champion (2021); 4× Spanish League champion (2011, 2014, 2017, 2018); 4× Spanish Cup champion (2017, 2018, 2019, 2020)

Laura Gil Collado (Note: In this Spanish name, the first or paternal surname is Gil and the second or maternal family name is Collado.) (born 24 April 1992) is a Spanish basketball player for Valencia Basket and the Spain women's national basketball team. At club level, she has been on teams that won the 2011 EuroLeague, the 2021 EuroCup and three Spanish Leagues competitions. As a member of the Spain national teams, she has been a medallist in all the tournaments she has played in from 2007 to 2019: nine medals at youth level and eight medals at senior level. The last medal won was gold at the EuroBasket Women 2019.

== Club career ==
Gil played as a junior in the Segle XXI project from 2008 to 2010, where young talents are developed from youth teams to the Spanish second tier. In 2010, she signed for one of the top teams in the league Perfumerías Avenida, winning the 2011 EuroLeague and the Spanish League. She spent the next five years in four different clubs, winning the 2014 league, going back to former club CB Avenida in 2016, where they won the double league-cup in 2017 and 2018.

=== EuroLeague and EuroCup statistics ===
Winner

Season	Team	GP	MPP	PPP	RPP	APP
2010–11 EuroLeague	Halcón Avenida	6	3.0	0.7	0.5	
2013–14 EuroLeague	Rivas Ecópolis	8	26.5	6.4	5.2	0.6
2016–17 EuroLeague	Perfumerías Avenida	17	19.7	4.5	3.2	0.7
2017–18 EuroLeague	Perfumerías Avenida	8	20.8	3.6	3.3	0.8
2017–18 EuroCup	Perfumerías Avenida	4	21.2	5.0	5.5	0.8
2018–19 EuroLeague	Perfumerías Avenida	14	24.0	5.2	5.1	1.4
2018–19 EuroCup	Perfumerías Avenida	2	27.4	8.5	6.0	0.0
2019–20 EuroCup	Perfumerías Avenida	10	24.9	7.9	4.6	2.2
2020-21 EuroCup	Valencia Basket	7	26.4	10.6	3.9	3.6

== National team ==
Gil started playing with Spain's youth teams at 15, winning a total of nine medals from 2007 to 2012. She made her debut with the senior team in 2013, when she was 21 years old. Up to 2021, she had 134 caps with 4.4 PPG:

- 2007 FIBA Europe Under-16 Championship (youth)
- 2008 FIBA Europe Under-16 Championship (youth)
- 2009 FIBA Europe Under-18 Championship (youth)
- 2009 FIBA Under-19 World Championship (youth)
- 2010 FIBA Europe Under-20 Championship (youth)
- 2010 FIBA Europe Under-18 Championship (youth)
- 2011 FIBA Europe Under-20 Championship (youth)
- 2011 FIBA Under-19 World Championship (youth)
- 2012 FIBA Europe Under-20 Championship (youth)
- 2013 Eurobasket
- 2014 World Championship
- 2015 Eurobasket
- 2016 Summer Olympics
- 2017 Eurobasket
- 2018 World Championship
- 2019 Eurobasket
- 7th 2021 Eurobasket
- 6th 2020 Summer Olympics
- 2023 Eurobasket
