= 2013 South American Basketball Championship for Women =

33rd South American Women's Basketball Championship

Tournament details
- Host country: Argentina
- City: Mendoza
- Dates: 31 July – 4 August
- Teams: 8 (from 1 confederation)
- Venue: 1 (in 1 host city)

Final positions
- Champions: Brazil (24th title)
- Runners-up: Argentina
- Third place: Chile

Tournament statistics
- MVP: (Brazil) Damiris Dantas

Official website
- South American Women's Basketball Championship 2013

The 2013 South American Basketball Championship for Women was the 33rd edition of the tournament. Eight teams participated in the competition, held in Mendoza, Argentina, from 31 July to 4 August 2013. Brazil were the defending champion and retain the title.

== Preliminary round ==
Qualified for the semifinals

=== Group A ===
Team	Pts	Pld	W	L	PF	PA	PD
Brazil	6	3	3	0	286	135	+151
Chile	5	3	2	1	233	177	+56
Colombia	4	3	1	2	152	195	–43
Peru	3	3	0	3	112	276	–164

July 31
14:00

Report

Colombia	64–31	Peru
Scoring by quarter: 18–7, 13–9, 14–12, 19–3
Pts: Mosquera 14; Rebs: Martínez 8 Asts: Palacio 3		Pts: Plasencia 10; Rebs: González 8 Asts: Debenedetti 2

July 31
19:30

Report

Brazil	80–63	Chile
Scoring by quarter: 20–12, 18–16, 24–17, 18–18
Pts: Dantas 22; Rebs: Dantas 14; Asts: Ribeiro 3		Pts: Morrison 13; Rebs: Morrison 9 Asts: seven players 1

August 1
14:30

Report

Peru	37–116	Brazil
Scoring by quarter: 6–29, 3–23, 11–31, 17–33
Pts: Debenedetti 12; Rebs: García 6 Asts: two players 1		Pts: T. Nascimento 17; Rebs: F. Nascimento 13; Asts: Costa 6

August 1
19:00

Report

Chile	74–53	Colombia
Scoring by quarter: 15–10, 24–6, 23–13, 12–24
Pts: Morrison 21; Rebs: Morrison 17; Asts: Novión 5		Pts: Olarte 10; Rebs: Sánchez, Martínez 4 Asts: Olarte 3

August 2
14:30

Report

Brazil	90–35	Colombia
Scoring by quarter: 29–0, 20–5, 20–16, 21–14
Pts: Ribeiro 17; Rebs: Dantas 9 Asts: four players 3		Pts: Olarte 9 Rebs: Mosquera 7 Asts: Olarte 2

August 2
19:00

Report

Peru	44–96	Chile
Scoring by quarter: 18–29, 9–21, 4–27, 13–19
Pts: Scamarone 13; Rebs: González 6 Asts: García 2		Pts: Morrison 38; Rebs: Morrison 15; Asts: Basaez 6

=== Group B ===
Team	Pts	Pld	W	L	PF	PA	PD
Argentina	6	3	3	0	293	135	+158
Venezuela	5	3	2	1	218	229	–11
Paraguay	4	3	1	2	201	231	–30
Uruguay	3	3	0	3	144	261	–117

July 31
16:30

Report

Uruguay	46–67	Venezuela
Scoring by quarter: 8–19, 14–13, 14–17, 10–18
Pts: Pereyra 25; Rebs: Pereyra 7 Asts: three players 1		Pts: Márquez 13; Rebs: Wallen 12; Asts: four players 2

July 31
21:30

Report

Argentina	83–34	Paraguay
Scoring by quarter: 18–3, 24–12, 19–10, 22–9
Pts: González 13; Rebs: Cabrera 7 Asts: Gretter 7		Pts: Ghiringhelli 8 Rebs: Peña 7 Asts: Mercado 2

August 1
16:45

Report

Venezuela	93–86 (OT)	Paraguay
Scoring by quarter: 19–17, 22–15, 20–23, 16–22, Overtime: 16–9
Pts: Silva 28; Rebs: Wallen 10; Asts: Pérez 4		Pts: Ferrari 52; Rebs: Peña, Huttemann 6 Asts: Mercado 12

August 1
21:15

Report

Uruguay	43–113	Argentina
Scoring by quarter: 4–29, 15–23, 14–29, 10–32
Pts: Pereyra 11; Rebs: Somma 5 Asts: Pereyra, Dagnino 1		Pts: González 17; Rebs: Sánchez, Vega 6 Asts: Flores 4

August 2
16:45

Report

Paraguay	81–55	Uruguay
Scoring by quarter: 16–12, 26–19, 20–12, 19–12
Pts: C. Aponte 22; Rebs: three players 5 Asts: Ghiringhelli 7		Pts: Guadalupe 18; Rebs: Guadalupe 13; Asts: Pereyra 3

August 2
21:15

Report

Argentina	97–58	Venezuela
Scoring by quarter: 23–4, 24–19, 22–14, 28–21
Pts: González 28; Rebs: Sánchez 14; Asts: Gretter 10		Pts: Silva 11; Rebs: Silva, Blanco 6 Asts: Wallen 2

== Classification round ==
Semi-finals
August 3 – Mendoza
Colombia	66
Uruguay	52
August 3 – Mendoza
Paraguay	82
Peru	47

Fifth place
August 4 – Mendoza
Colombia	67
Paraguay	75
Seventh place
August 4 – Mendoza
Uruguay	61
Peru	49

=== 5th–8th classification ===
August 3
15:30

Report

Colombia	66–52	Uruguay
Scoring by quarter: 10–14, 18–11, 12–23, 26–4
Pts: Martínez 23; Rebs: Mosquera 11; Asts: Sánchez 3		Pts: Pereyra 16; Rebs: Dibarboure 8 Asts: Martinelli, Pereyra 2

August 3
17:45

Report

Paraguay	82–47	Peru
Scoring by quarter: 24–11, 17–10, 11–8, 30–18
Pts: Ferrari 20; Rebs: V. Aponte, Caraves 6 Asts: Mercado, Caraves 3		Pts: Quiroz 16; Rebs: Vega 8 Asts: Debenedetti 2

=== Seventh place game ===
August 4
15:30

Report

Uruguay	61–49	Peru
Scoring by quarter: 16–16, 14–7, 12–6, 19–20
Pts: Guadalupe 23; Rebs: López, Pereyra 6 Asts: Somma 5		Pts: Plasencia 15; Rebs: García 7 Asts: Plasencia 2

=== Fifth place game ===
August 4
17:45

Report

Colombia	67–75	Paraguay
Scoring by quarter: 27–13, 13–13, 18–16, 9–33
Pts: Martínez 19; Rebs: García 10; Asts: Olarte 4		Pts: Ferrari 29; Rebs: Mercado 9 Asts: Ferrari 3

== Final round ==
Semi-finals
August 3 – Mendoza
Brazil	76
Venezuela	41
August 3 – Mendoza
Argentina	68
Chile	58

Final
August 4 – Mendoza
Brazil	67
Argentina	58
Third place
August 4 – Mendoza
Venezuela	56
Chile	74

=== Semifinals ===
August 3
20:05

Report

Brazil	76–41	Venezuela
Scoring by quarter: 14–13, 12–15, 18–4, 32–9
Pts: Dantas, Bibiano 16; Rebs: Dantas 10; Asts: Dantas 4		Pts: Silva 8 Rebs: Blanco 10; Asts: Silva, Pérez 2

August 3
22:10

Report

Argentina	68–58	Chile
Scoring by quarter: 11–12, 21–13, 16–17, 20–16
Pts: Liñeira 16; Rebs: Sánchez 8 Asts: Liñeira 3		Pts: Morrison 21; Rebs: Morrison 11; Asts: Novión, Aragonese 2

=== Third place game ===
August 4
19:55

Report

Venezuela	56–74	Chile
Scoring by quarter: 20–20, 8–13, 15–23, 13–18
Pts: Silva 16; Rebs: Corrales 9 Asts: Silva 4		Pts: Gómez 19; Rebs: Morrison 16; Asts: Novión 4

=== Final ===
August 14
22:00

Report

Brazil	67–58	Argentina
Scoring by quarter: 17–18, 18–18, 22–10, 10–12
Pts: Paixão 19; Rebs: Dantas 11; Asts: Costa 6		Pts: Vega 18; Rebs: Vega 10; Asts: Gretter 3

== Final standings ==
Rank	Team	Record
1st place, gold medalist(s)	Brazil	5–0
2nd place, silver medalist(s)	Argentina	4–1
3rd place, bronze medalist(s)	Chile	3–2
4	Venezuela	2–3
5	Paraguay	3–2
6	Colombia	2–3
7	Uruguay	1–4
8	Peru	0–5
