= Beatriz Sánchez =

Beatriz Sánchez may refer to:

- Beatriz Sánchez (basketball) (born 1989), Spanish basketball player
- Beatriz Sánchez (journalist) (born 1970), Chilean journalist and presidential candidate
