= 2019 Copa de la Reina de Baloncesto =

2019 Copa de la Reina
Tournament details
- Country: Spain
- City: Vitoria-Gasteiz
- Venue: Medizorroza
- Dates: 28 February - 3 March 2019
- Teams: 8
- Defending champions: Perfumerías Avenida

Final positions
- Champions: Perfumerías Avenida
- Runners-up: Spar CityLift Girona

Tournament statistics
- Matches played: 7

Awards
- MVP: Érika de Souza

The Copa de la Reina de Baloncesto 2019 was the 57th edition of the Spanish Queen's Basketball Cup. It is managed by the Spanish Basketball Federation – FEB and was 28 February to 3 March 2019 in the Polideportivo de Mendizorroza, Vitoria-Gasteiz. Perfumerías Avenida beat Spar CityLift Girona 79-71 in the final. Érika de Souza was the MVP.

== Qualification ==
Prior to the start of the season, the rules of the Spanish Basketball Federation established that the top seven teams classified after the end of the first half of the 2018–19 League (13th matchday, 30 December 2018), would play the competition along with the host chosen by the Federation.

=== Qualified teams ===
Pos	Team	Pld	W	L	PF	PA	PD	Pts	Seeding
1	Spar CityLift Girona	13	12	1	1055	739	+316	25	Qualified as seeded teams
2	Perfumerías Avenida	13	12	1	961	726	+235	25	Qualified as seeded teams
3	Lointek Gernika Bizkaia	13	10	3	935	801	+134	23	Qualified as seeded teams
4	Cadí La Seu	13	10	3	892	805	+87	23	Qualified as seeded teams
5	Valencia Basket	13	9	4	881	800	+81	22	
6	IDK Gipuzkoa	13	8	5	819	799	+20	21	
7	Nissan Al-Qázeres Extremadura	13	6	7	900	898	+2	19	
9	RPK Araski (H)	13	5	8	803	894	−91	18	

Source: Liga Femenina
(H) Hosts

== Draw ==
The Cup was drawn on 15 February 2019 in Vitoria-Gasteiz. The seeded teams were paired in the quarterfinals with the non-seeded teams. There were not any restrictions for the draw of the semifinals.

== Bracket ==
Quarterfinals
28 February
Spar CityLift Girona	52
Valencia Basket	49
28 February
Cadí La Seu	66
RPK Araski	60
1 March
Perfumerías Avenida	102
Nissan Al-Qázeres Extremadura	63
1 March
Lointek Gernika Bizkaia	83
IDK Gipuzkoa	70

Semifinals
2 March
Spar CityLift Girona	80
Cadí La Seu	60
2 March
Perfumerías Avenida	74
Lointek Gernika Bizkaia	46

Final
3 March
Spar CityLift Girona	71
Perfumerías Avenida	79
