= Cecilia Liñeira =

Argentine-Czech basketball player

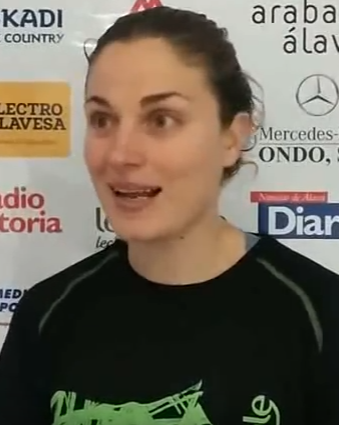
- Born: María Cecilia Liñeira; 10 May 1983 (age 43); Buenos Aires, Argentina
- Other name: Miss Ascenso
- Height: 1.82 m (6 ft 0 in)
- Basketball career

No. 26 – Megacalzado Ardoi
- Position: Small forward
- League: Liga Femenina 2

María Cecilia Liñeira (born 10 May 1983) is an Argentine-Czech professional basketball player, who played the 2018–2019 season for Megacalzado Ardoi in Liga Femenina 2.

== Biography ==
María Cecilia Liñeira was born in Buenos Aires in 1983. She has a university degree in Surgical Instrumentation, a profession she practiced in her home country, where she attended several operations. Her degree was not recognized in Spain, and she has studied in two other fields: nursing, and psychology at the National University of Distance Education (UNED).

== Career ==
Cecilia Liñeira started her professional basketball career at her native Lanús, but when she was very young she decided to cross the Atlantic. She has a Community passport, since she has family connections to Argentina, Poland, Spain, Italy, and the Czech Republic. The passport of the latter country, the home of her grandfather, opened the doors to European basketball for her.

She has been described as "a leader both on the court and in the locker room." Since 2006 she has played for six Spanish clubs. The first was CB Pio XII in A Coruña, where she spent two seasons playing in Liga Femenina 2 (LF2). Since then, Liñeira's career has been linked to the Basque Autonomous Community. From 2008 to 2011 she joined the ranks of UNB Obenasa Navarra, playing her last season there in the Liga Femenina (LF). From there she returned to the lower division to play for Irlandesas for half a year, before joining Ibaizabal. The club achieved promotion to the LF, with Liñeira being named Most Valuable Player that season.

She has played for promotion to the LF five times, achieving it twice, hence her nickname "Miss Ascenso". In 2014, Liñeira was named to LF2's "Ideal Quintet" (Quinteto Ideal) of the day on four occasions, highlighting her performance in Ourense, where she was named MVP of Day 16 with 30 points, 19 rebounds and 4 assists for a total of 50 valuation points. She has averaged 14.2 points and 8.4 rebounds (19.1 valuation points, making her the fifth most valued player in group A).

Days before the start of the 2017–2018 season, Cecilia Liñeira, renewed by Araski AES, was forced to suspend her sports career due to an irrevocable job offer in Pamplona, which she felt she had to accept due to economic concerns.

For the 2018–2019 season she signed for the club Megacalzado Ardoi, with which she achieved promotion to LF2.

== Clubs ==
- Burzaco, Argentina
- Lanús, Argentina
- 2006–2008 – CB Pio XII, A Coruña: LF2
- 2008–2011 – UNB Obenasa Navarra: 2 seasons in LF2 and the last in the LF
- 2011–2012 – Irlandesas: half year in LF2
- 2012–2015 – GDKO Ibaizábal: 2 seasons in LF2 and one in the LF
- 2015 – Granate, Argentina, since the end of the season in Spain
- 2015-2016 – Araski AES: LF2
- 2016-2017 – Araski AES: LF
- 2018–2019 – Megacalzado Ardoi

== Argentine national team ==
Liñeira has played for the Argentina women's national basketball team, nicknamed Las Gigantes (The Giants), in the following competitions:

- 2006 South American Championship (Asunción, Paraguay)
- 2013 South American Championship (Mendoza, Argentina)

== National championships ==
Title	Club	Country	Year
Liga Femenina 2 Champions	Araski AES	Spain	2016
Copa de la Reina Semifinalists	Araski AES	Spain	2017
Liga Femenina Semifinalists	Araski AES	Spain	2017
