= 2018 Copa de la Reina de Baloncesto =

2018 Copa de la Reina
Tournament details
- Arena: Pabellón Príncipe Felipe; Zaragoza, Spain
- Dates: 19–21 January 2017

The Copa de la Reina de Baloncesto 2018 was the 56th edition of the Spanish Queen's Basketball Cup. It is managed by the Spanish Basketball Federation – FEB and was held between January 19 and 21, 2018.

== Qualification ==
Prior to the start of the season, the rules of the Spanish Basketball Federation established that the top six teams classified at the end of the first leg of the 2017–18 Liga Femenina, would play the Competition.

The two first qualified teams qualify directly for the semifinals.

=== Qualified teams ===
Pos	Team	Pld	W	L	GF	GA	GD	Pts	Qualification
1	Perfumerías Avenida	13	12	1	969	707	+262	25	Qualification to semifinals
2	Spar CityLift Girona	13	11	2	997	815	+182	24	Qualification to semifinals
3	Star Center–Uni Ferrol	13	10	3	927	883	+44	23	Qualification to quarterfinals
4	Mann-Filter (H)	13	8	5	947	891	+56	21	Qualification to quarterfinals
5	IDK Gipuzkoa	13	8	5	842	810	+32	21	Qualification to quarterfinals
6	Snatt's Femení Sant Adrià	13	8	5	909	915	−6	21	Qualification to quarterfinals

Source: Liga Femenina
(H) Hosts

== Bracket ==
Qualification round 19 January
Star Center–Uni Ferrol	61
IDK Gipuzkoa	79
Snatt's Femení Sant Adrià	62
Mann-Filter	73

Semifinals; 20 January
Perfumerías Avenida	58
IDK Gipuzkoa	48
Spar CityLift Girona	80
Mann-Filter	60

Final; 21 January
Perfumerías Avenida	76
Spar CityLift Girona	62
