= Quinn Dornstauder =

Canadian basketball player (born 1995)

No. 11 – Angers
- Position: Center
- League: LFB

Personal information
- Born: 16 August 1995 (age 31) Regina, Canada
- Listed height: 6 ft 4 in (1.93 m)

Career information
- College: Arizona State University
- Playing career: 2017–present

Career history
- 2017–2018: Bembibre
- 2018–2019: Casablanca
- 2019–2020: Zamarat
- 2020–2021: Cadí La Seu
- 2021–2022: Castors Braine
- 2022–2023: Zagłębie Sosnowiec
- 2023: Xalapa Falcons
- 2023–2024: Zagłębie Sosnowiec
- 2024–present: Angers

Quinn Dornstauder (born 16 August 1995) is a Canadian professional basketball player for Angers. She played college basketball for the Arizona State University.

== Career ==
In 2017, Quinn started her career with Bembibre. In the 2017–18 season, she averaged 34.7 minutes, 14.5 points, 9.5 rebounds and 1.6 assists per game.

== National team career ==
=== Junior teams ===
Quinn won the bronze medal with the Canada women's national under-17 basketball team and she took part in the 2012 FIBA Under-17 World Championship for Women.
