= 2007 FIBA EuroCup Final Four =

Tournament details
- Arena: Pavelló Municipal Girona-Fontajau; Girona, Spain
- Dates: April 2007

Final positions
- Champions: (Spain) Akasvayu Girona (1st title)
- Runners-up: (Ukraine) Azovmash
- Third place: (Italy) WWF Italia Virtus
- Fourth place: (Spain) MMT Estudiantes

Awards and statistics
- MVP: (Slovenia) Ariel McDonald

The 2007 FIBa EuroCup Final Four was the concluding tournament of the 2006–07 FIBA EuroCup. Akasvayu Girona won its first title, after beating Azovmash 79–72 in the Final.

== Bracket ==
Semi-finals
(Spain) MMT Estudiantes	58
(Spain) Akasvayu Girona	89
(Italy) WWF Italia Virtus	73
(Ukraine) Azovmash	74

Final
(Spain) Akasvayu Girona	79
(Ukraine) Azovmash	72
Third place
(Spain) MMT Estudiantes	62
(Italy) WWF Italia Virtus	80

== Final standings ==
	Team
Gold medal	(Spain) Akasvayu Girona
Silver medal	(Ukraine) Azovmash
Bronze medal	(Italy) WWF Italia Virtus
	(Spain) MMT Estudiantes
