= Beatriz Sánchez (basketball) =

Spanish basketball player

No. 28 – Durán Ensino
- Position: Power forward
- League: LFB

Personal information
- Born: 20 December 1989 (age 36) Cádiz, Spain
- Listed height: 6 ft 3 in (1.91 m)
- Listed weight: 165 lb (75 kg)

Career history
- 2007–2009: Uni-Cajacanarias (LF2)
- 2009–2010: ADBA Avilés (LF2)
- 2010–2011: Universitario de Ferrol (LF2)
- 2011–2013: CB Bembibre PDM
- 2013–2018: Universitario de Ferrol
- 2018–2019: Uni Girona CB
- 2019–: Durán Ensino

Beatriz Sánchez (born 20 December 1989) is a Spanish basketball player for Durán Maquinaria Ensino and the Spanish national team.

She won gold medal at the EuroBasket Women 2017.

== Club career ==
She started in the youth levels of CB Portuense, moving to Uni-Cajacanarias as a senior in 2007, in the second tier of the Spanish League. In the following years she played at ADBA Avilés, Universitario de Ferrol and CB Bembibre PDM, winning promotion to the first tier in 2012. In 2013 she signed for Universitario de Ferrol. In 2018 she signed for Spar CityLift Girona, and in 2019 for Durán Maquinaria Ensino

== National team ==
She played one youth tournament with the Spanish squad in 2007, and she made her debut with the senior team in 2017, winning gold medal at the 2017 Eurobasket:

- 2007 FIBA Europe Under-18 Championship for Women (youth)
- 2017 Eurobasket
- 2018 World Championship
