= Livia López =

Spanish basketball player (born 1979)

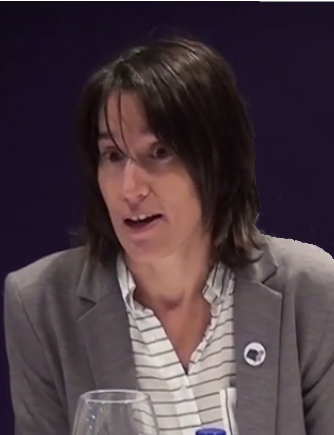

City Councillor of Vitoria-Gasteiz
- Incumbent
- Assumed office 2019

Personal details
- Born: Livia Claudia López Gutiérrez; 11 April 1979 (age 47) Bilbao, Spain
- Party: Basque Nationalist
- Occupation: Basketball player, politician
- Basketball career

Personal information
- Listed height: 5 ft 10 in (1.78 m)

Livia Claudia López Gutiérrez (born 11 April 1979) is a Spanish retired basketball player and former president of the Araski AES women's basketball club. Since 2019, she has been a city councillor in Vitoria-Gasteiz. She is the niece of former player Juanma López Iturriaga.

== Early life ==
Livia López was born in Bilbao on 11 April 1979.

== Sports career ==
Livia López played for several teams in the capital of Álava for almost two decades. She began her career with two seasons at the San Martín school team (1992–1994). At 15, she started her second year of cadet football at Araba, remaining with the club for two more seasons as a junior and another two at the national level.

In 1999, her group of friends left Araba. For a year, she played futsal for the Valdegovia team, but basketball remained a part of her life, and on 15 May 2001, she founded the club Abaroa. López played at the national level for every season except her last, when she played for the senior team.

In 2010, UPV-Alava and Abaroa merged to create Araski AES. López only played the 2014-2015 season for the senior team, then called Viajes Bidasoa Araski.

In a 2016 interview, she stated that "Araski aims to be a role model for girls and female players throughout the region," and "Throughout my sporting career, my constant goal was to improve, to learn how to be a better player and, above all, a better person. For me, the atmosphere within the teams was paramount, and in fact, throughout my playing career, I was often involved in efforts to create the best possible atmosphere among the players and with the coaches."

== Management career ==
In 2001, she founded the club Abaroa, managed by the players and chaired by López. It started with just one team in a league and ended the 2009–2010 season with a structure consisting of two cadet teams, one junior team, one senior team, and two teams in the national league. She left the court to found the Women's Association and Sports Group of Basketball Araski Arabako Emakumeen Saskibaloia (Araski AES), together with Madelén Urieta and others.

== Political career ==
López was recruited by the Basque Nationalist Party to be part of its electoral list for the 2019 municipal elections. She obtained a seat and was appointed councillor for sport and health.

== Other professional activities ==
López was one of the producers of the ETB 2 program Conquistour in 2012.

== Awards and recognition ==
- El Correo Award for the best sports figures of 2008
- Vitoria City Council 2012 Promotion of Women's Sports Award
- Association of Professional and Businesswomen of Álava (AMPEA) 2013 Women's Executive Award
- Tribute from the Araski AES Club for her dedication, 9 April 2016
