= María Pina =

Spanish basketball player

No. 12 – Valencia Basket
- Position: Small forward
- League: Liga Femenina

Personal information
- Born: August 8, 1987 (age 39) Valencia, Spain
- Listed height: 6 ft 2 in (1.88 m)

Career information
- Playing career: 2005–present

Career history
- 2005–2007: CB Estudiantes
- 2007–2008: Rivas Futura
- 2008–2009: CB San José
- 2009–2010: Real Club Celta Indepo
- 2010–2012: Mann Filter Zaragoza
- 2012–2014: CB Avenida
- 2014–2016: CB Conquero
- 2016: Union Féminine Angers Basket 49
- 2016–2018: Gernika KESB
- 2018–present: Valencia Basket

Career highlights
- EuroCup champion (2021); Spanish League champion (2013); 2x Spanish Cup champion (2014, 2016)

María Pina Tolosa, born in Valencia, on 8 August 1987, is a Spanish women's basketball 1.87 m small forward, who currently plays at Valencia Basket.

She made her debut in the Liga Femenina in season 2005–2006 with CB Estudiantes and has played in several clubs of the Spanish top division.

In 2016, Pina signed for Angers Basket, where she played for one year before coming back to Spain, playing for Gernika KESB in season 2017–18. She signed for her hometown club Valencia Basket for the 2018–19 season.

She has been a member of the Spanish National team on 41 occasions, with whom she played the 2006 FIBA World Championship for Women and two EuroBasket Women.

== EuroLeague and EuroCup statistics ==
Winner

Season	Team	GP	MPP	PPP	RPP	APP
2008-09 EuroCup	CB San José	12	11.0	2.4	0.9	0.4
2010-11 EuroCup	CDB Zaragoza	8	20.2	6.5	3.0	0.5
2012–13 EuroLeague	Halcón Avenida	13	10.2	2.3	0.8	0.2
2013–14 EuroLeague	Halcón Avenida	8	6.3	1.8	0.6	0.2
2017–18 EuroCup	Gernika KESB	3	32.6	12.3	5.0	2.0
2019–20 EuroCup	Valencia Basket	6	22.8	11.5	3.3	2.3
2020-21 EuroCup	Valencia Basket	6	10.3	3.2	1.3	0.3
2021–22 EuroCup	Valencia Basket					

== Awards and accomplishments ==
- Spanish League: (1) 2012–13
- Spanish Cup: (2) 2014, 2016
- Spanish Supercup: (2) 2012, 2013

== National team ==
Pina started playing with Spain's youth teams at 15, winning a total of three medals from 2003 to 2007. She made her debut with the senior team in 2006. Up to 2021, she had 41 caps with 2.4 PPG:

- 4th 2003 FIBA Europe Under-16 Championship (youth)
- 2004 FIBA Europe Under-18 Championship (youth)
- 2005 FIBA Europe Under-18 Championship (youth)
- 4th 2006 FIBA Europe Under-20 Championship (youth)
- 2007 FIBA Europe Under-20 Championship (youth)
- 8th 2006 World Championship
- 9th 2011 Eurobasket
- 2019 Eurobasket
