= Araski AES =

RPK Araski
- Leagues: Liga Femenina
- Founded: 2010
- Arena: Polideportivo Mendizorrotza
- Capacity: 2,603
- Location: Vitoria-Gasteiz, Spain
- Team colors: Green and pink
- President: (Spain) Livia López
- Head coach: (Spain) Madelén Urieta
- Championships: 1 Liga Femenina 2
- Website: araski.com
Home	Away

Araski AES, also known as Kutxabank Araski for sponsorship reasons, is a women's basketball team based in Vitoria-Gasteiz, Basque Country, Spain. The team currently plays in league Liga Femenina de Baloncesto.

== History ==
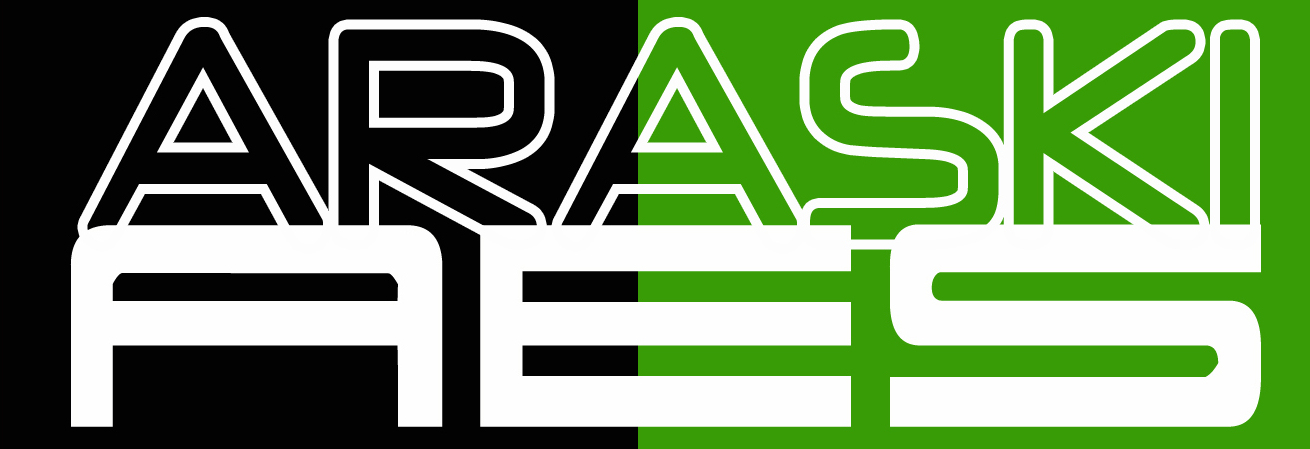
Portion of the first logo of the club, used until August 2017.

In September 2010, Abaroa and UPV Álava merged to found the Araski Association with the aim to develop the women's basketball. In May 2016, the team was promoted to Liga Femenina.

In its first season in the top tier, Araski qualified for the Copa de la Reina, where it eliminated host team Star Center–Uni Ferrol in the quarterfinals, but were defeated by Spar CityLift Girona in the semifinals.

Araski ended in fourth position after reaching the semifinals of the competition. This was the best performance ever for a newcomer in the league.

== Sponsorship naming ==
Araski AES has had several names through the years due to its sponsorship:

- Caja Vital Kutxa: 2010–2011
- Caja Vital Kutxa UPV: 2011–2013
- UPV/EHU Araba Araski: 2013–2014
- Lacturale Araski: 2015–2018
- RPK Araski: 2018–2020
- Kutxabank Araski: 2020 - present

== Home arenas ==
- Polideportivo Mendizorrotza (2013–present)

== Coaches ==
- Madelén Urieta 2010–2014
- Aitor Uriondo 2014–2015
- Madelén Urieta 2015–present

== Season by season ==
Season	Tier	Division	Pos.	W–L	Copa de la Reina
2010–11	3	1ª División	4th	20–10	
2011–12	3	1ª División	2nd	24–5	
2012–13	3	1ª División	1st	25–1	
2013–14	2	Liga Femenina 2	9th	7–15	
2014–15	2	Liga Femenina 2	7th	12–10	
2015–16	2	Liga Femenina 2	2nd	24–6	
2016–17	1	Liga Femenina	4th	15–15	Semifinalist
2017–18	1	Liga Femenina	10th	10–16	
2018–19	1	Liga Femenina	7th	10–18	Quarterfinalist
2019–20	1	Liga Femenina	5th	12–10	Semifinalist
2020–21	1	Liga Femenina	11th	12–18	
2021–22	1	Liga Femenina	12th	11–19	
2022–23	1	Liga Femenina			Quarterfinalist

== Trophies and awards ==
=== Trophies ===
- Liga Femenina 2: (1)
  - 2015–16
