= Paola Ferrari (basketball) =

Paraguayan basketball player

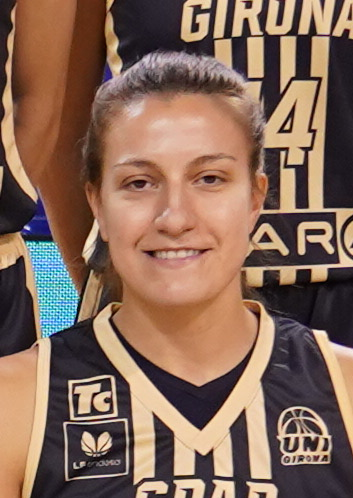

No. 7 – Stadium Casablanca
- Position: Shooting guard
- League: Liga Femenina de Baloncesto

Personal information
- Born: 16 September 1985 (age 41) Asunción, Paraguay
- Listed height: 5 ft 10 in (1.78 m)

Career information
- College: Union University (2004); University of Quevedo (2005)

Paola Andrea Ferrari Yegros (born 16 September 1985) is a Paraguayan basketball player. She currently plays for PB63 Battipaglia in Serie A2 as a shooting guard.

== Biography ==
Paola Ferrari began playing basketball at age 7 at the club Deportivo Internacional in her native Asunción.

She played her first South American Championship in Peru, in the cadet category, where she stood out as the top scorer of the tournament. She made her debut in the senior league of Paraguay at age 14, where she played for several teams, including Deportivo Internacional, Deportivo San Jose, UAA. She had outstanding performances in the South American Championships at all levels, being proclaimed the best player, top scorer, and best three-point shooter on several occasions.

After training in the United States in 2003 at Tomahawk High School in Wisconsin, Ferrari played for Union University of Tennessee in 2004. A year later, she played for the University of Quevedo, where the team reached the semifinals. That same season, at age 20, she decided to jump to Spain to play for Alumisan Pio XII of Santiago de Compostela in Liga Femenina 2. After a quick adjustment period, she finished the season as the second-highest scorer in the category. The following season, she played for Joventut Mariana de Sóller in a bid for promotion, but they could not achieve it.

In 2007 she debuted in the Liga Femenina for Baloncesto Rivas, but a lack of minutes made her change teams in December and finish a great season with Burgos. In 2008, after a season with Estudiantes, Ferrari returned to Sóller, where she achieved great numbers over four seasons.

During those years, she also played for the Universidad Tecnológica Equinoccial, where she entered the Ecuadorian league in 2011 and played in the South American Championship. In 2012 she suffered a serious injury, a ruptured anterior cruciate ligament of the knee, which kept her off the court until January 2013, when she returned to play for CB Avenida in Spain, winning the Liga Femenina. For the 2013–2014 season, she played for Corinthians/Americana of the Liga Brasileña, where she won two more titles (Liga de Brasil and Liga Paulista). She returned to Spain once again, for CB Avenida, where she won the Supercopa de España and the Copa de la Reina, completing all of the country's national titles. In 2015 Ferrari achieved this feat in her native country, winning the Metropolitan Trophy with Club Sol de América without losing a game, and being elected MVP. After signing for Stadium Casablanca of Zaragoza, she became the season's top scorer. In the 2016–2017 season she played in the playoffs for CD Ibaeta. In 2017, she returned to Stadium Casablanca.

Ferrari plays internationally for the Paraguay.

== Career ==
=== Club ===
Team	League	Seasons
Deportivo Internacional	Mini to Senior Paraguay	1992-1999
UAA	Liga de Paraguay Paraguay	2000
Deportivo Internacional	Liga de Paraguay Paraguay	2001
Deportivo San Jose	Liga de Paraguay Paraguay	2003
Tomahawk High School	High School United States	2003
Union University of Tennessee	WNCAA United States	2004
University of Quevedo	Liga de Paraguay Paraguay	2005
Vidrogal Alumisán Pío XII	Liga Femenina 2 Spain	2005–2006
Joventut Mariana de Sóller	Liga Femenina 2 Spain	2006–2007
Rivas Futura	Liga Femenina Spain	2007–2008
Arranz Jopisa Burgos	Liga Femenina Spain	2007–2008
CB Estudiantes	Liga Femenina Spain	2008–2009
Joventut Mariana de Sóller	Liga Femenina Spain	2008–2009
UTE	Liga Ecuatoriana Ecuador	2009
Joventut Mariana de Sóller	Liga Femenina Spain	2009–2010
Joventut Mariana de Sóller	Liga Femenina Spain	2010–2011
UTE	Liga Ecuatoriana Ecuador	2011
Joventut Mariana de Sóller	Liga Femenina Spain	2011–2012
UTE	Liga Ecuatoriana Ecuador	2012
CB Avenida	Liga Femenina Spain	2013
Corinthians/Americana	Liga Brasileña Brazil	2013–2014
UTE	Liga Sudamericana Ecuador	2014
CB Avenida	Liga Femenina Spain	2014–2015
Sol de América	Liga de Paraguay Paraguay	2015
Stadium Casablanca	Liga Femenina Spain	2015–2016
CD Ibaeta	Liga Femenina Spain	2016–2017
Olimpia	Liga de Paraguay Paraguay	2017
Stadium Casablanca	Liga Femenina Spain	Since 2017

=== International ===
- 1999 South American Championship Sub-16
- 2000 South American Championship Sub-16
- 2001 South American Championship Sub-18
- 2005 South American Championship seniors
- 2006 South American Championship seniors
- 2010 South American Championship seniors
- 2013 South American Championship seniors
- 2017 AmeriCup seniors (pre-world)

== Championships ==
- Liga Femenina de España (1): 2013
- Copa de la Reina (1): 2015
- Supercopa de España (1): 2014
- Liga Ecuatoriana (1): 2011
- Liga de Brasil (1): 2014
- Liga Paulista de Brasil (1): 2014
- National Championship of Paraguay (6): 1998, 2000, 2001, 2003, 2006, 2015, 2017

== Awards ==
- Chosen best basketball player of Paraguay (2): 2014, 2015
- Chosen one of the two best athletes of the century by the National Sports Secretary of Paraguay (2015)
- Best South American scorer (4): 2005, 2006, 2010, 2013
- Top scorer of the Liga Femenina de España (1): 2016
- All-Liga Femenina de España Team (1): 2016
- All-AmeriCup Team: 2017
- Top scorer of AmeriCup with 87 points (2017)
