= 2017 Copa de la Reina de Baloncesto =

2017 Copa de la Reina
Tournament details
- Arena: Palau Girona-Fontajau; Girona, Spain
- Dates: 10–12 February 2017

Final positions
- Champions: Perfumerías Avenida
- Runners-up: Spar CityLift Girona

Awards and statistics
- MVP: (Spain) Silvia Domínguez

The Copa de la Reina de Baloncesto 2017 was the 55th edition of the Spanish Queen's Basketball Cup. It was managed by the Spanish Basketball Federation – FEB and was held between February 10 and 12, 2017.

== Qualification ==
Prior to the start of the season, the rules of the Spanish Basketball Federation established that the three first teams classified at the end of the first leg of the 2016–17 Liga Femenina, together with the club representing the host province would play the Competition. If the host finished between the three first teams, the fourth classified would also participate.

However, on 15 November 2016, the Spanish Basketball Federation expanded the competition to the first six qualified teams at the half of the season, removing the spot for a host team. The two best teams will qualify directly to the semifinals while the other four teams will join the competition in the round of quarterfinals.

=== Qualified teams ===
Pos	Team	Pld	W	L	PF	PA	PD	Pts	Qualification
1	Perfumerías Avenida	13	12	1	930	689	+241	25	Qualification to semifinals
2	Spar CityLift Girona (H)	13	11	2	1001	839	+162	24	Qualification to semifinals
3	Lointek Gernika Bizkaia	13	9	4	820	716	+104	22	Qualification to quarterfinals
4	Lacturale Araski	13	8	5	806	836	−30	21	Qualification to quarterfinals
5	Al-Qázeres Extremadura	13	7	6	856	871	−15	20	Qualification to quarterfinals
6	Star Center–Uni Ferrol	13	7	6	867	927	−60	20	Qualification to quarterfinals

Source: Liga Femenina
(H) Hosts

== Host City ==
On 21 December 2016, the Spanish Basketball Federation announced Girona as host city of the event.

== Bracket ==
Qualification round
Lacturale Araski	64
Star Center–Uni Ferrol	62
Lointek Gernika Bizkaia	66
Al-Qázeres Extremadura	54

Semifinals
Spar CityLift Girona	78
Lacturale Araski	71
Perfumerías Avenida	72
Lointek Gernika Bizkaia	48

Final
Spar CityLift Girona	76
Perfumerías Avenida	80

== Final ==
12 February 2017
20:30

Report

Spar CityLift Girona	76–80	Perfumerías Avenida
Scoring by quarter: 16–17, 25–13, 15–31, 20–19
Pts: Ibekwe 22; Rebs: Ibekwe 22; Asts: Jordana 5 PIR: Coulibaly 26		Pts: Domínguez 27; Rebs: De Souza 9 Asts: Domínguez 5 PIR: Domínguez 37

Fontajau, Girona
Attendance: 4,261
Referees: De Lucas de Lucas, Olivares Iglesias
