= Gernika KESB =

Spanish basketball team

- Leagues: Women's team: LF
- Founded: 1996
- Arena: Maloste
- Location: Gernika, Spain
- Team colors: Red and White
- President: Gerardo Candina
- Head coach: Mario López
- Website: www.gernikasaski.com
Home

Gernika Kirol Elkartea Saski Baloia, also known as Lointek Gernika Bizkaia for sponsorship reasons, is a women's basketball team based in Gernika, Basque Country, Spain. The team currently plays in Liga Femenina.

== History ==
Founded in 1996, Gernika KESB promoted for the first time to Femenina on 27 April 2014, by beating Fundal Alcobendas by 57–48 in the final game of the promotion playoffs.

== Season by season ==
Season	Tier	Division	Pos.	Copa de la Reina	European competitions	
2005–06	3	1ª División	4th			
2006–07	3	1ª División	8th			
2007–08	3	1ª División	2nd			
2008–09	3	1ª División	4th			
2009–10	3	1ª División	3rd			
2010–11	3	1ª División	2nd			
2011–12	2	Liga Femenina 2	10th			
2012–13	2	Liga Femenina 2	6th			
2013–14	2	Liga Femenina 2	1st			
2014–15	1	Liga Femenina	6th			
2015–16	1	Liga Femenina	6th			
2016–17	1	Liga Femenina	5th	Semifinalist		
2017–18	1	Liga Femenina	5th		2 EuroCup	GS
2018–19	1	Liga Femenina	5th	Semifinalist	2 EuroCup	PO1
2019–20	1	Liga Femenina	DNF	Quarterfinalist	2 EuroCup	PO3
2020–21	1	Liga Femenina	4th	Semifinalist	2 EuroCup	PO1
