= Uni Girona CB =

Spanish basketball club

SPAR Girona
- Leagues: Liga Femenina
- Founded: 2005
- Arena: Palau Girona-Fontajau
- Location: Girona, Spain
- Team colors: Red and black
- President: Cayetano Perez
- Head coach: Alfred Julbe
- Championships: 2 Spanish League; 2 Spanish Supercup
- Website: unigirona.cat
Home	Away

Logo used until 2016.

Uni Girona Club de Basquet, also known as Spar Girona (previously Spar Citylift Girona) for sponsorship reasons, is a Spanish professional women's basketball club from Girona.

== History ==
Founded in 2005 from the fusion of local clubs CE Santa Eugènia and CB Vedruna, the team attained promotion for the Spanish First League in 2009, ending 5th in its first two seasons. In 2012 it qualified for the Copa de la Reina and the playoffs for the first time.

On April 23, 2015, Uni Girona won the Spanish League after defeating Perfumerías Avenida in the final series by 2–0.

== Roster ==
Note: Flags indicate national team eligibility at FIBA-sanctioned events. Players may hold other non-FIBA nationalities not displayed.

Spar Girona roster
Players
Coaches

Pos.	No.	Nat.	Name	Ht.	Age
C	0	(South Sudan) (Canada)	Bulgak, Adut	1.93 m (6 ft 4 in)	33 – 20 December 1992
SG	2	(United States)	Conner, Madison	1.80 m (5 ft 11 in)	23 – 29 July 2003
PG	4	(Spain)	Martín, Iyana	1.76 m (5 ft 9 in)	20 – 18 January 2006
SF	6	(Spain)	Cañizares, Laura	1.84 m (6 ft 0 in)	30 – 15 April 1996
PF	11	(Spain)	Guerrero, Carolina	1.88 m (6 ft 2 in)	26 – 1 September 2000
PF/C	15	(Turkey)	Şenyürek, Tilbe	1.92 m (6 ft 4 in)	31 – 26 April 1995
C	16	(Spain)	Mateo, Marta	1.90 m (6 ft 3 in)	24 – 16 February 2002
SG	18	(Spain)	Casas, Queralt	1.77 m (5 ft 10 in)	33 – 18 November 1992
SG	22	(Argentina) (Spain)	Camilión, Juana	1.79 m (5 ft 10 in)	27 – 22 March 1999
SF	24	(Spain)	López, Ainhoa (C)	1.82 m (6 ft 0 in)	29 – 6 June 1997
PG	25	(Montenegro)	Leković, Marija	1.66 m (5 ft 5 in)	23 – 21 July 2003
PF	44	(France)	Merceron, Axelle	1.87 m (6 ft 2 in)	23 – 25 April 2003

Head coach

- (Spain) Roberto Íñiguez

Assistant coach(es)

- (Spain) Jordi Sargatal
- (Spain) Olga Vázquez

Legend

- (C) Team captain
- Injured

- Roster
Updated: 7 October 2026

== Season by season ==
Season	Tier	Division	Pos.	Copa de la Reina	European competitions	
2005–06	3	Copa Catalunya	12th			
2006–07	2	Liga Femenina 2	14th			
2007–08	2	Liga Femenina 2	4th			
2008–09	2	Liga Femenina 2	1st			
2009–10	1	Liga Femenina	5th			
2010–11	1	Liga Femenina	5th			
2011–12	1	Liga Femenina	3rd	Semifinalist		
2012–13	1	Liga Femenina	3rd	Semifinalist		
2013–14	1	Liga Femenina	5th			
2014–15	1	Liga Femenina	1st	Semifinalist		
2015–16	1	Liga Femenina	2nd	Semifinalist	1 EuroLeague	RS
2016–17	1	Liga Femenina	2nd	Runner-up	2 EuroCup	R8
2017–18	1	Liga Femenina	2nd	Runner-up	2 EuroCup	QF
2018–19	1	Liga Femenina	1st	Runner-up	2 EuroCup	SF
2019–20	1	Liga Femenina	2nd	Runner-up	2 EuroCup	—
2020–21	1	Liga Femenina	3rd	Champion	1 EuroLeague	QF
2021–22	1	Liga Femenina	3rd	Runner-up	1 EuroLeague	QF
2022–23	1	Liga Femenina	5th	Quarterfinalist	1 EuroLeague	RS
2023–24	1	Liga Femenina	4th	Quarterfinalist	2 EuroCup	SF
2024–25	1	Liga Femenina	3rd	Semifinalist	2 EuroCup	QF

== Trophies ==
- Liga Femenina de Baloncesto: (2)
  - 2015, 2019
- Supercopa de España: (2)
  - Winners: 2015, 2019.
  - Runner-up: 2012.

== Notable players ==
Criteria

To appear in this section a player must have either:

- Played at least three seasons for the club.
- Set a club record or won an individual award while at the club.
- Played at least one official international match for their national team at any time.
- Played at least one official WNBA match at any time.

- (Brazil) Nádia Colhado
- (United States) Chelsea Gray
- (United States) Keisha Hampton
- (Spain) Nuria Martínez
- (United States) Kelsey Mitchell
- (United States) Shay Murphy
- (Spain) Laia Palau
- (Lithuania) Lina Pikčiūtė
- (Czech Republic) Julia Reisingerová
- (United States) Rebekah Gardner
- (Sweden) Binta Daisy Drammeh
- (United States) Kennedy Burke
- (Spain) Laia Flores
- (France) Ornella Bankole
