= Universitario de Ferrol =

- Leagues: Liga Femenina
- Founded: 1997
- Arena: Pabellón Municipal de Esteiro, Ferrol
- Location: Ferrol, Spain
- Team colors: White
- President: Leopoldo Ibáñez
- Head coach: Lino López
- Championships: 5 Copa Galicia
- Website: www.uniferrol.org
Home	Away

Club Universitario de Ferrol, also known as Baxi Ferrol for sponsorship reasons, is a women's professional Basketball team based in Ferrol, Spain. The team currently plays in the top tier of the Spanish League.

== Current roster ==
Universitario Ferrol roster
Players
Coaches

Pos.	No.	Nat.	Name	Age
F/C	21	(Finland)	Aijanen, Maria	30 – 1 October 1995
C	33	(United States)	Allen, Jenna	28 – 5 May 1997
G		(Spain)	Benet, Patricia	37 – 5 March 1988
G	8	(Spain)	Cabrera, Patricia	34 – 15 May 1991
G		(Spain)	Delgado, Marina	33 – 9 April 1992
F	19	(Bosnia and Herzegovina)	Kapor, Tamara	34 – 27 December 1991
G	13	(Samoa)	Leaupepe, Geraldynn	29 – 25 March 1996
G	12	(United States)	Miller, Macy	30 – 11 July 1995
F	41	(South Africa)	Swart, Sune	34 – 15 May 1991
G	21	(Spain)	Tudanca Acedo, Marta	35 – 10 April 1990

Head coach

- (Spain) Lino López

Assistant coach(es)

- (Spain) Sandra Prieto Sánchez

Legend

- (C) Team captain
- Injured

- [Roster Roster]
Updated: March 7, 2020

== Season by season ==
Season	Tier	Division	Pos.	Copa de la Reina
1997–98	3	2ª División		
1998–99	3	2ª División	3rd (Note: Invited to promote thanks a vacant place.)	
1999–00	2	1ª División	14th	
2000–01	2	1ª División	13th (Note: Achieved a place in the newly created Liga Femenina 2.)	
2001–02	2	Liga Femenina 2	8th	
2002–03	2	Liga Femenina 2	9th	
2003–04	2	Liga Femenina 2	5th	
2004–05	2	Liga Femenina 2	1st	
2005–06	1	Liga Femenina	14th	
2006–07	2	Liga Femenina 2	2nd	
2007–08	2	Liga Femenina 2	10th	
2008–09	2	Liga Femenina 2	4th	
2009–10	2	Liga Femenina 2	8th	
2010–11	2	Liga Femenina 2	6th	
2011–12	2	Liga Femenina 2	5th	
2012–13	2	Liga Femenina 2	3rd	
2013–14	2	Liga Femenina 2	1st (Note: Promoted to Liga Femenina after achieving a vacant place.)	
2014–15	1	Liga Femenina	11th	
2015–16	1	Liga Femenina	9th	
2016–17	1	Liga Femenina	3rd	Quarterfinalist
2017–18	1	Liga Femenina	4th	Quarterfinalist
2017–18	1	Liga Femenina	14th	
2019-20		Liga Femenina 2		
