= AE Sedis Bàsquet =

Spanish basketball club

Cadí La Seu
- Leagues: Men's team: Liga EBA; Women's team: LF
- Founded: 1965
- History: 1965-present
- Arena: Palau d'Esports
- Location: La Seu d'Urgell, Spain
- Team colors: Blue and white
- President: Pep Ribes
- Head coach: Pepe Vázquez
- Website: www.sedisbasquet.com
Home	Away

Associació Esportiva Sedis Bàsquet, a.k.a. Cadí La Seu for sponsorship reasons, is a basketball team of La Seu d'Urgell, Spain. The women's team currently plays in Liga Femenina while the men's one plays in Regional divisions after resigning to its berth in Liga EBA in summer 2012.

== Women's team ==
=== Current roster ===
Cadí La Seu roster
Players
Coaches

Pos.	No.	Nat.	Name	Ht.	Wt.	Age
PG	12	(Spain)	Aviñoa, Marina	1.80 m (5 ft 11 in)		22 – 27 April 2004
SG	21	(United States)	Donarski, Lexi	1.83 m (6 ft 0 in)		24 – 11 January 2002
C	6	(Spain)	Mata, Marina	1.85 m (6 ft 1 in)		21 – 7 January 2005
PF	5	(France)	Mbu, Palmire	1.85 m (6 ft 1 in)		23 – 12 May 2003
SF	13	(Spain)	Morales, Marta	1.85 m (6 ft 1 in)		23 – 12 March 2003
C	24	(France)	Niare, Nahan	1.92 m (6 ft 4 in)		24 – 15 February 2002
PG	10	(Italy)	Orsili, Alessandra	1.68 m (5 ft 6 in)		24 – 4 October 2001
SF	7	(Spain)	Palma, Anna	1.85 m (6 ft 1 in)		26 – 27 April 2000
SG	4	(Spain)	Raventós, Laia	1.65 m (5 ft 5 in)		29 – 4 April 1997
PF	22	(Germany)	Sontag, Lina	1.91 m (6 ft 3 in)		22 – 24 November 2003
PG	14	(Spain)	Suárez, Paula	1.83 m (6 ft 0 in)		22 – 20 September 2003

Head coach

Pepe Vázquez

Legend

- (C) Team captain
- Injured

- Roster
Updated: 2026-7-21

== Season by season ==
=== Women's team ===
Season	Tier	Division	Pos.	W–L	Copa de la Reina
2000–01	2	1ª División	1st (Note: Promoted by replacing L'Hospitalet, who regisned to continue playing in Liga Femenina.)	30–5	
2001–02	1	Liga Femenina	8th	11–17	
2002–03	1	Liga Femenina	9th	11–15	
2003–04	1	Liga Femenina	13th	7–19	
2004–05	2	Liga Femenina 2	2nd	24–7	
2005–06	1	Liga Femenina	13th	7–19	
2006–07	2	Liga Femenina 2	1st	29–2	
2007–08	1	Liga Femenina	9th	10–16	
2008–09	1	Liga Femenina	10th	9–17	
2009–10	1	Liga Femenina	10th	11–15	
2010–11	1	Liga Femenina	12th	9–17	
2011–12	1	Liga Femenina	7th	13–13	
2012–13	1	Liga Femenina	4th	14–10	
2013–14	1	Liga Femenina	7th	10–12	
2014–15	1	Liga Femenina	4th	19–10	
2015–16	1	Liga Femenina	5th	17–9	
2016–17	1	Liga Femenina	8th	13–13	
2017–18	1	Liga Femenina	7th	13–13	
2018–19	1	Liga Femenina	3rd	23–8	Semifinalist
2019–20	1	Liga Femenina	6th	11–11	Quarterfinalist
2020–21	1	Liga Femenina	9th	13–17	
2021–22	1	Liga Femenina	4th	20–13–1	Quarterfinalist
2022–23	1	Liga Femenina	7th	15–17	
2023–24	1	Liga Femenina	11th	12–18	
2024–25	1	Liga Femenina	11th	12–18	

=== Men's team ===
Season	Tier	Division	Pos.	W–L
2000–01	6	1ª Catalana	1st	29–3
2001–02	5	Copa Catalunya	10th	15–15
2002–03	5	Copa Catalunya	5th	19–11
2003–04	5	Copa Catalunya	5th	19–11
2004–05	5	Copa Catalunya	9th	15–15
2005–06	5	Copa Catalunya	3rd	20–10
2006–07	5	Copa Catalunya	9th	15–15
2007–08	6	Copa Catalunya	1st	27–5
2008–09	5	Liga EBA	6th	18–12
2009–10	4	Liga EBA	10th	10–14
2010–11	4	Liga EBA	9th	15–15
2011–12	4	Liga EBA	6th (Note: Resigned to its berth in Liga EBA.)	17–11
2012–13	7	2ª Catalana	1st	26–7
2013–14	6	1ª Catalana	2nd	22–11
2014–15	5	Copa Catalunya	5th	18–12
2015–16	5	Copa Catalunya	14th	6–26
2016–17	6	1ª Catalana	10th	12–18
2017–18	6	1ª Catalana	9th	15–15
2018–19	6	1ª Catalana	10th	14–15
2019–20	6	1ª Catalana	9th	8–12
2020–21	6	1ª Catalana	3rd	5–4
2021–22	6	1ª Catalana	14th	11–18
2022–23	6	1ª Catalana	11th	11–15
2023–24	8	2ª Catalana	5th	15–11
2024–25	8	2ª Catalana	12th	8–18
