= Polideportivo Municipal José Antonio Gasca =

Sports pavilion in San Sebastián, Spain

Coordinates: 43°18′04″N 1°58′33″W

José Antonio Gasca
- Interactive map of José Antonio Gasca
- Former names: Polideportivo de Anoeta
- Location: San Sebastián, Basque Country, Spain
- Capacity: 2,500

Tenants
- Gipuzkoa BC; CD Ibaeta; Askatuak SBT

Polideportivo Municipal José Antonio Gasca is an indoor arena located in San Sebastián, Spain. It is primarily used for basketball and the home stadium of Askatuak SBT, San Sebastián Gipuzkoa BC and CD Ibaeta.

The arena holds 2,500 people.

Formerly known as Polideportivo de Anoeta, it was renamed after José Antonio Gasca on February 25, 1992.
