= Pavelló Girona-Fontajau =

Indoor arena in Girona, Spain

Coordinates: 41°59′26″N 2°48′38″E

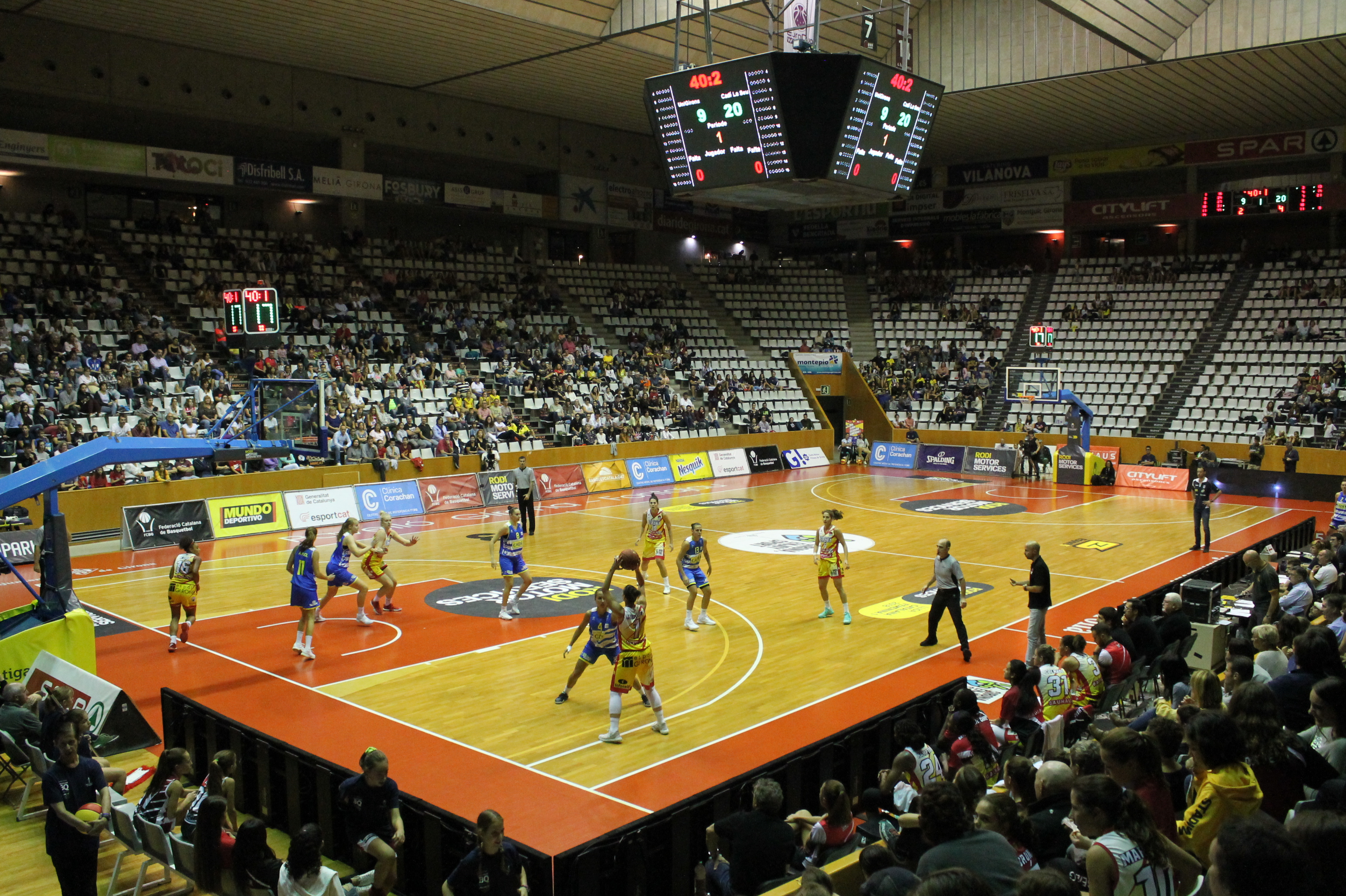
- Interactive map of Pavelló Girona-Fontajau
- Full name: Pavelló Girona-Fontajau
- Owner: Town Hall of Girona
- Capacity: 5,500
- Surface: Parquet Floor
- Record attendance: 7,450 (Valvi Girona v Breogán; 30 April 1995)

Construction
- Opened: 4 September 1993

Tenants
- CB Sant Josep (1993–2013); Uni Girona CB; Bàsquet Girona

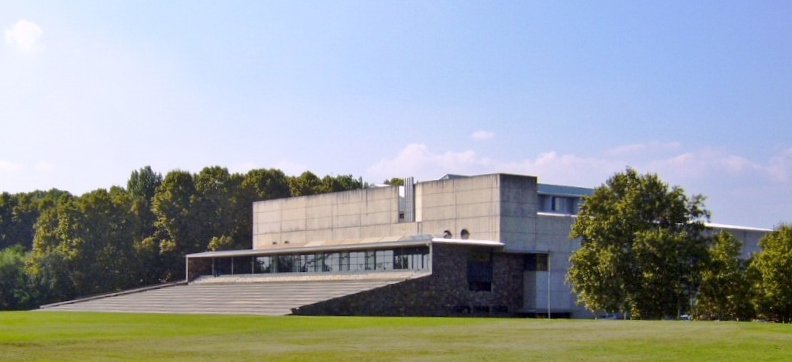
Outside view

Pavelló Girona-Fontajau is an indoor arena in Girona, Catalonia, northern Spain, that holds 5,500 people. It is primarily used for basketball and is the home arena of Uni Girona CB and Bàsquet Girona.

The building was built between 1991 and 1993, designed by the architects Esteve Bonell and Josep M. Gil. It is structured in two levels, one for the public (the high level) and another, of which use is restricted to the sportsmen (the low level), with separate entries.

The arena was inaugurated on September 4, 1993. Valvi Girona won in an exhibition game against Greek club PAOK, with the presence of NBA legend Moses Malone as a guest.

Besides basketball, it is used also for other sports like Indoor motorcycle trials and tennis matches.

== Notable events ==
Fontajau hosted the matches of three groups of the EuroBasket 1997 and the 2007 FIBA EuroCup Final Four, that local club Akasvayu Girona won.

In 2017, it hosted the Copa de la Reina de Baloncesto.

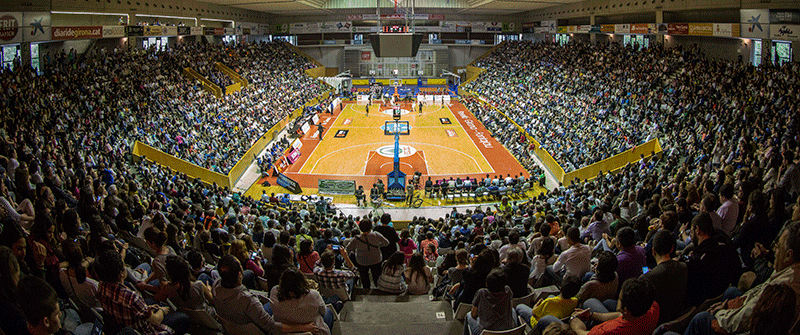
The interior of the arena in 2015

== Attendances ==
This is a list of league attendances of CB Girona when it played in the Liga ACB.

Season	Total	High	Low	Average
1994–95 ACB	101,839	7,450	3,000	4,629
1995–96 ACB	94,652	6,082	4,071	4,982
1996–97 ACB	75,352	6,515	2,432	4,432
1997–98 ACB	80,008	5,899	4,133	4,706
1998–99 ACB	81,765	5,930	2,840	4,543
1999–2000 ACB	72,543	3,033	4,988	4,267
2000–01 ACB	70,459	5,013	2,438	4,145
2001–02 ACB	74,169	4,989	3,759	4,363
2002–03 ACB	65,273	5,369	2,890	3,840
2003–04 ACB	75,331	5,981	3,155	4,431
2004–05 ACB	77,263	5,942	3,234	4,545
2005–06 ACB	94,934	5,972	4,123	4,997
2006–07 ACB	86,039	5,227	3,825	4,528
2007–08 ACB	75,303	5,220	2,824	4,184
