= Silvia Domínguez =

Spanish basketball player

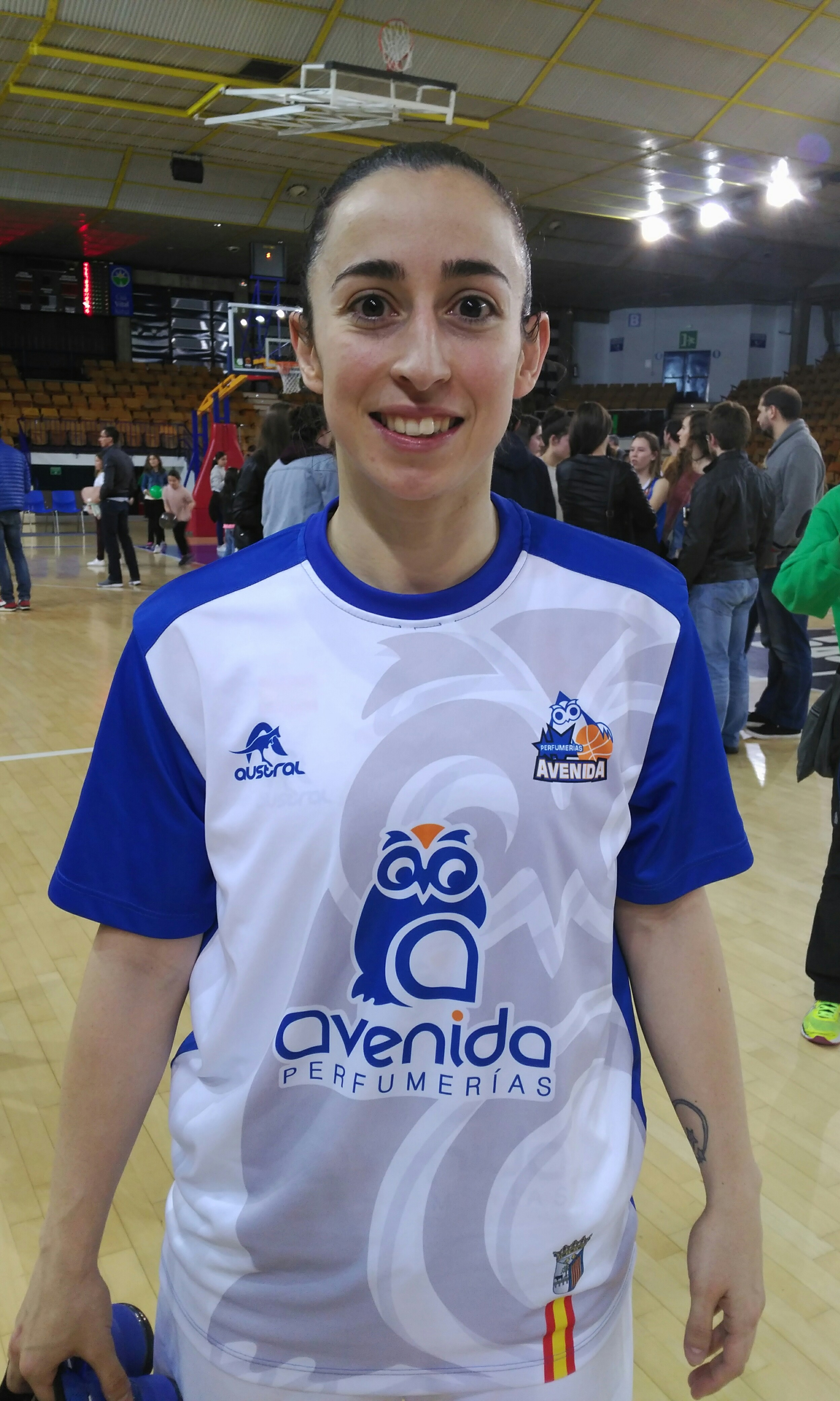

No. 6 – Perfumerías Avenida
- Position: Point guard
- League: LF

Personal information
- Born: 31 January 1987 (age 39) Montgat, Spain
- Listed height: 5 ft 5 in (1.65 m)
- Listed weight: 141 lb (64 kg)

Career history
- 2002–2004: UB-Barça
- 2004–2006: Estudiantes
- 2006–2011: Perfumerías Avenida
- 2011–2012: Ros Casares Valencia
- 2012–2015: UMMC Ekaterinburg
- 2015–2025: Perfumerías Avenida

Career highlights
- 3× EuroLeague champion (2011, 2012, 2013); 7× Spanish League champion (2003, 2011, 2012, 2016, 2017, 2018, 2021); 4× Spanish Cup champion (2017, 2018, 2019, 2020); 3× Russian League champion (2013, 2014, 2015); 2× Russian Cups (2013, 2014)

Silvia Domínguez Fernández (Note: In this Spanish name, the first or paternal surname is Domínguez and the second or maternal family name is Fernández.) (born 31 January 1987) is a Spanish basketball player for Perfumerías Avenida and the Spain women's national basketball team. She won three EuroLeague Women and multiple medals for Spain.

== Club career ==
Domínguez played basketball from a very young age in school clubs in or around Barcelona and Badalona. She moved to Madrid to play for CB Estudiantes at 17, before being transferred to CB Avenida in 2006, becoming a key figure of the team as well as captain, winning the 2010–11 EuroLeague. She spent her next season at the other top Spanish of the moment, Ros Casares Valencia, winning the 2011–12 EuroLeague. She made history one season later, when playing for Russian club UMMC Ekaterinburg she won the 2012–13 EuroLeague, making it three in a row with three clubs.

She is back to play in Spain for Perfumerías Avenida since 2015.

=== EuroLeague and EuroCup statistics ===
EuroLeague winner

Season	Team	GP	MPP	PPP	RPP	APP
2006–07 EuroLeague	(Spain) Perfumerías Avenida	12	23.3	6.1	1.2	2.3
2007–08 EuroLeague	(Spain) Perfumerías Avenida	12	17.5	6.6	1.3	1.8
2008–09 EuroLeague	(Spain) Perfumerías Avenida	17	28.8	6.4	2.6	3.4
2009–10 EuroLeague	(Spain) Perfumerías Avenida	15	30.1	6.4	3.1	3.7
2010–11 EuroLeague	(Spain) Perfumerías Avenida	16	26.8	5.7	2.2	4.1
2011–12 EuroLeague	(Spain) Ros Casares	18	23.1	5.8	1.9	3.8
2012–13 EuroLeague	(Russia) UMMC Ekaterinburg	17	23.9	4.2	2.5	4.4
2013–14 EuroLeague	(Russia) UMMC Ekaterinburg	15	23.3	4.9	3.0	2.9
2014–15 EuroLeague	(Russia) UMMC Ekaterinburg	15	11.6	1.9	1.3	4.4
2015–16 EuroLeague	(Spain) Perfumerías Avenida	14	25.7	8.6	2.6	5.2
2016–17 EuroLeague	(Spain) Perfumerías Avenida	16	30.2	8.4	3.1	4.7
2017–18 EuroLeague	(Spain) Perfumerías Avenida	14	27.2	11.1	3.1	2.0
2017–18 EuroCup	(Spain) Perfumerías Avenida	4	26.5	12.8	2.8	4.3
2018–19 EuroLeague	(Spain) Perfumerías Avenida	14	30.5	8.2	3.1	5.9
2018–19 EuroCup	(Spain) Perfumerías Avenida	2	31.8	9.0	4.0	4.0
2019–20 EuroCup	(Spain) Perfumerías Avenida	10	20.7	6.4	1.8	4.2
2020–21 EuroLeague	(Spain) Perfumerías Avenida	9	23.1	6.3	2.8	5.1

== National team ==
She played in Spain's youth teams from 2003 to 2007, making her debut with the senior team at 19 in 2006. In November 2021 she became the captain of the team, with 197 caps and 4.0 PPG:

- 4th 2003 FIBA Europe Under-16 Championship for Women (youth)
- 2004 FIBA Europe Under-18 Championship for Women (youth)
- 5th 2005 FIBA Under-19 World Championship for Women (youth)
- 2005 FIBA Europe Under-18 Championship for Women (youth)
- 4th 2006 FIBA Europe Under-20 Championship for Women (youth)
- 2007 FIBA Europe Under-20 Championship for Women (youth)
- 8th 2006 World Championship
- 2009 Eurobasket
- 9th 2011 Eurobasket
- 2013 Eurobasket
- 2014 World Championship
- 2015 Eurobasket
- 2016 Summer Olympics
- 2017 Eurobasket
- 2018 World Championship
- 2019 Eurobasket
- 7th 2021 Eurobasket
- 6th 2020 Summer Olympics
- 2023 Eurobasket
