= CB Avenida =

Spanish basketball team

Perfumerías Avenida
- Leagues: Liga Femenina
- Founded: 1988
- History: Universidad de Salamanca; 1988–1994; Halcón Viajes; 1994–2002; Perfumerías Avenida; 2002–present
- Arena: Pabellón de Würzburg
- Location: Salamanca, Spain
- Team colors: Blue
- President: Jorge Recio
- Head coach: Anna Montañana
- Championships: 1 EuroLeague Women; 1 European SuperCup; 8 Liga Femenina; 10 Copa de la Reina; 9 Supercopa de España; 16 Copa Castilla y León
- Website: www.perfumerias avenidabaloncesto.com
Home	Away

Perfumerías Avenida Baloncesto formerly C.B. Halcón Viajes, is a women's professional basketball team based in Salamanca, Spain. The team currently plays in the Liga Femenina de Baloncesto.

In 2011 Perfumerías Avenida won the Euroleague, and was runner-up in 2009 and 2021.

== Season by season ==
Season	Tier	Division	Pos.	Copa de la Reina	European competitions	
1994–95	1	1ª División		Semifinalist		
1995–96	1	1ª División	2nd	Semifinalist	2 Ronchetti Cup	QF
1996–97	1	Liga Femenina	5th			
1997–98	1	Liga Femenina	6th			
1998–99	1	Liga Femenina	2nd			
1999–00	1	Liga Femenina	5th		2 Ronchetti Cup	R16
2000–01	1	Liga Femenina	6th	Runner-up	2 Ronchetti Cup	QR2
2001–02	1	Liga Femenina	7th		2 Ronchetti Cup	GS
2002–03	1	Liga Femenina	6th			
2003–04	1	Liga Femenina	6th	Runner-up		
2004–05	1	Liga Femenina	3rd	Champion	2 EuroCup	CPO
2005–06	1	Liga Femenina	1st	Champion	2 EuroCup	SF
2006–07	1	Liga Femenina	2nd	Runner-up	1 EuroLeague	R16
2007–08	1	Liga Femenina	2nd	Semifinalist	1 EuroLeague	R16
2008–09	1	Liga Femenina	2nd	Quarterfinalist	1 EuroLeague	RU
2009–10	1	Liga Femenina	2nd	Runner-up	1 EuroLeague	QF
2010–11	1	Liga Femenina	1st	Semifinalist	1 EuroLeague	C
2011–12	1	Liga Femenina	2nd	Champion	1 EuroLeague	R16
2012–13	1	Liga Femenina	1st	Runner-up	1 EuroLeague	R16
2013–14	1	Liga Femenina	2nd	Champion	1 EuroLeague	R16
2014–15	1	Liga Femenina	2nd	Champion	1 EuroLeague	QF
2015–16	1	Liga Femenina	1st	Runner-up	1 EuroLeague	RS
2016–17	1	Liga Femenina	1st	Champion	1 EuroLeague	QF
2017–18	1	Liga Femenina	1st	Champion	1 EuroLeague	RS
2017–18	1	Liga Femenina	1st	Champion	2 EuroCup	SF
2018–19	1	Liga Femenina	2nd	Champion	1 EuroLeague	RS
2018–19	1	Liga Femenina	2nd	Champion	2 EuroCup	QF
2019–20	1	Liga Femenina	DNF	Champion	2 EuroCup	QF
2020–21	1	Liga Femenina	1st	Semifinalist	1 EuroLeague	RU
2021–22	1	Liga Femenina	1st	Champion	1 EuroLeague	SF
2022–23	1	Liga Femenina	Runner-up	Runner-up	1 EuroLeague	SF
2023–24	1	Liga Femenina	Runner-up	Semifinalist	1 EuroLeague	QF
2024–25	1	Liga Femenina	SF	Runner-up	1 EuroLeague	R2

== Squad ==
Perfumerías Avenida roster
Players
Coaches

Pos.	No.	Nat.	Name	Ht.	Wt.	Age
G	1	(Netherlands)	Cornelius, Laura	1.73 m (5 ft 8 in)		30 – 8 February 1996
F	3	(Mali)	Koné, Sika	1.90 m (6 ft 3 in)		24 – 31 January 2002
G	6	(Spain)	Dominguez, Silvia	1.66 m (5 ft 5 in)		39 – 31 January 1987
G/F	8	(Belgium)	Delaere, Antonia	1.81 m (5 ft 11 in)		31 – 1 August 1994
G	10	(Spain)	Martín, Iyana	1.72 m (5 ft 8 in)		20 – 18 January 2006
F/C	11	(United States)	Burdick, Cierra	1.88 m (6 ft 2 in)		32 – 20 September 1993
F	13	(Spain)	Vilaró, Andrea	1.82 m (6 ft 0 in)		33 – 9 May 1993
F/C	21	(Anguilla) (United Kingdom)	Herbert-Harrigan, Mikiah	1.88 m (6 ft 2 in)		27 – 21 August 1998
G	22	(Puerto Rico) (United States)	Guirantes, Arella	1.81 m (5 ft 11 in)		28 – 15 October 1997
G	23	(United States)	Carter, Arica	1.73 m (5 ft 8 in)		30 – 19 July 1996
F/C	30	(Spain)	Gil, Laura	1.90 m (6 ft 3 in)		34 – 24 April 1992
C	34	(Greece)	Fasoula, Maria	1.96 m (6 ft 5 in)		28 – 2 September 1997

Head coach

- (Spain) Roberto Íñiguez

Roster updated: November 6, 2024

Legend

- (C) Team captain
- Injured

== Honours ==
=== National ===
- Liga Femenina (8)
  - Champion: 2005–06, 2010–11, 2012–13, 2015–16, 2016–17, 2017–18, 2020–21, 2021-22
  - Runner-up: 1995–96, 1998–99, 2006–07, 2007–08, 2008–09, 2009–10, 2011–12, 2013–14, 2014–15, 2018–19, 2022-23, 2023-24
- Copa de la Reina (10)
  - Champion: 2005, 2006, 2012, 2014, 2015, 2017, 2018, 2019, 2020, 2022
  - Runner-up: 2001, 2004, 2007, 2010, 2013, 2016
- Supercopa de España (9)
  - Champion: 2010, 2011, 2012, 2013, 2014, 2016, 2017, 2018, 2020
  - Runner-up: 2004, 2005, 2006, 2007, 2015, 2019, 2021
- Copa Castilla y León (17)
  - Champion: 2001, 2002, 2003, 2004, 2005, 2007, 2008, 2009, 2011, 2013, 2014, 2015, 2017, 2018, 2020, 2021,2023
  - Runner-up: 2010, 2012, 2016, 2019

=== International ===
- EuroLeague Women (1)
  - Champion: 2010–11.
  - Runner-up: 2008–09, 2020-21.
- FIBA Europe SuperCup Women (1)
  - Champion: 2011
- EuroCup Women
  - Semifinals: 2005–06, 2017-18

=== MVP ===
- Amaya Valdemoro (League 2001–02)
- Nuria Martínez (Copa de la Reina 2005)
- Laura Camps (Copa de la Reina 2006)
- Anna Montañana (League 2007-08)
- Sancho Lyttle (Supercopa 2010)
- Alba Torrens (Euroleague 2010–11)
- DeWanna Bonner (Supercopa 2011)
- Erika de Souza (Copa de la Reina 2012)
- Roneeka Hodges (Supercopa 2012)
- Shay Murphy (Supercopa 2013)
- Angelica Robinson (Copa de la Reina 2014)
- Marta Xargay (Supercopa 2014)
- Angelica Robinson (Copa de la Reina 2015)
