= Liga Femenina 2 de Baloncesto =

Spanish women's third basketball league

Liga Femenina 2
- Founded: 2001; 25 years ago
- First season: 2001–02
- Country: Spain
- Federation: Spanish Federation
- Confederation: FIBA Europe
- Number of teams: 28 in 2 groups
- Level on pyramid: 3
- Promotion to: LF Challenge
- Relegation to: 1ª Nacional
- Website: www.ligafemenina2.es

The Liga Femenina 2 de Baloncesto, simply known as Liga Femenina 2, is the third division of league competition for Spanish women's basketball since the 2021–22 season.

It is the female equivalent of the men's Segunda FEB and is run by the Spanish Basketball Federation (FEB). It was founded in 2001. It is played under FIBA rules.

== Competition format ==
Teams in this league are divided into two groups by geographical criteria. The top four teams of each one, qualify to the promotion playoffs. In these playoffs, the qualified teams are divided into two groups of four teams, where the two top teams qualify to the Finals. The two winners of the finals promote to Liga Femenina.

Until 2005, the promotion playoff consisted in best-of-three games series between the top four teams of each group.

== History ==
Season	Promoted as champion	Promoted as runner-up
2001–02	Adecco Estudiantes	PDV Santa Eulalia
2002–03	PC Mendíbil	Rivas Futura
2003–04	Motiva Real Canoe	ACIS Mercaleón
2004–05	Universitario de Ferrol	Cadí La Seu
2005–06	Extrugasa	Rivas Futura
2006–07	Cadí La Seu	Agencia Serrano Badajoz
2007–08	USP-CEU MMT Estudiantes	COP Crespí Joventut Mariana
2008–09	Argon Uni Girona	Moguerza Real Canoe
2009–10	UNB Obenasa Navarra	Extrugasa
2010–11	Caja Rural Valbusenda	Arranz Jopisa Burgos
2011–12	Grupo Marsol Conquero	Coelbi Bembibre PDM
2012–13	Universidad del País Vasco	GDKO Ibaizabal
2013–14	Gernika Bizkaia	Al-Qázeres Extremadura
2014–15	CREF ¡Hola!	Plenilunio DO
2015–16	Lacturale Araski	Al-Qázeres Extremadura
2016–17	Snatt's Femení Sant Adrià	Adecco Estudiantes
2017–18	Durán Maquinaria Ensino	Valencia Basket
2018–19	Campus Promete	Ciudad de los Adelantados
