= Tamara Abalde =

Spanish basketball player

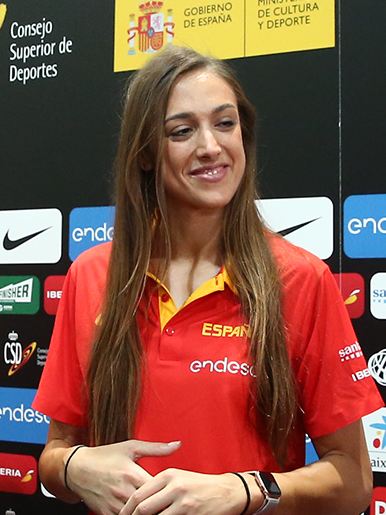

No. 6 – Durán Maq. Ensino
- Position: Power forward
- League: Liga Femenina

Personal information
- Born: 6 February 1989 (age 37) Ferrol, Spain
- Listed height: 6 ft 3 in (1.91 m)

Career information
- Playing career: 2004–present

Career history
- 2004–2007: Celta Vigo
- 2007–2008: Lamar Cardinals
- 2008–2010: Rivas Futura / Ecópolis
- 2011: UNB Obenasa Navarra
- 2011–2012: Pays d'Aix Basket 13
- 2012–2013: Basket Landes
- 2013–2015: Perfumerías Avenida
- 2015–2016: Cadí La Seu
- 2016–2017: CREFF ¡Hola!
- 2017–2018: Mann-Filter Casablanca
- 2018–2020: Valencia Basket
- 2020-2021: Kutxabank Araski
- 2021-present: Durán Maq. Ensino

Career highlights
- 2x Spanish Cup champion (2014, 2015); First-team All-Southland (2008); Southland Freshman of the Year (2008)

Tamara Abalde Díaz (born 6 February 1989 in Ferrol) is a Spanish basketball player, currently player for Spanish team Durán Maquinaria Ensino. She played for Spain in the 2008 Summer Games and for the Lamar Cardinals in the NCAA. She is 6 feet, one inch, and weighs 159 pounds.

Her father, Alberto Abalde Rodríguez was a professional basketball player from 1980 to 1993, and her brother, Alberto Abalde Díaz, is also a professional basketball player for Real Madrid.

== Playing career ==
=== Vigo ===
Coming from a basketball family, Abalde attended Compañía de María school (1998–2003) and San José de la Guía in Vigo before joining Celta de Vigo Baloncesto's youth teams in 2003. She made her debut in the Spanish top-tier league at 15.

=== NCAA ===
She was just the sixth player in Lamar history to be named to the Southland Conference First Team. In addition, she was only the second player to earn SLC Freshman of the Year honors.

The only freshman during the 2007–08 season to be named to the All-Southland Conference First Team, she recorded five double-doubles. In addition, she accumulated eight games with at least 20 points scored. Abalde scored a single-game high and school record tying 44 points against Wiley College on 24 November 2007. Her 16.0 points per game ranked sixth in the league in scoring. In addition, she was ninth in rebounds (7.1), shot a .424 mark from the field and was named conference player of the week twice.

=== Professional ===
After one season with Lamar of the NCAA, she decided to leave the team to pursue a professional career in Europe. She spent a couple of seasons at Baloncesto Rivas and half a season at UNB Obenasa Navarra. After a couple of seasons in France, she signed for Spanish powerhouse Perfumerías Avenida in 2013, winning two Spanish Cups, two Spanish Supercups and finishing as runner-up of the League twice. Looking for more playtime she spent the next three seasons in three different clubs (Cadí La Seu, CREFF ¡Hola! and Mann-Filter Casablanca) before signing for newly promoted team Valencia Basket in 2018.

=== Career statistics ===
==== EuroLeague and EuroCup stats ====
Legend
GP	Games played	GS	Games started	MPG	Minutes per game	RPG	Rebounds per game
APG	Assists per game	SPG	Steals per game	BPG	Blocks per game	PPG	Points per game
TO	Turnovers per game	FG%	Field-goal percentage	3P%	3-point field-goal percentage	FT%	Free-throw percentage
**Bold**	Career best	°	League leader

Season	Team	GP	MPP	PPP	RPP	APP
2008-09 EuroCup	(Spain) Rivas Ecópolis	8	18.6	6.9	2.6	1.4
2010-11 EuroLeague	(Spain) Rivas Ecópolis	5	13.2	3.2	1.4	0.2
2012-13 EuroCup	(France) Basket Landes	6	21.5	5.8	4.2	1.0
2013-14 EuroLeague	(Spain) Perfumerías Avenida	9	9.5	3.3	1.9	0.8
2014-15 EuroLeague	(Spain) Perfumerías Avenida	5	5.6	0.8	0.8	0.0

==== College ====
Year	Team	GP	GS	MPG	FG%	3P%	FT%	RPG	APG	SPG	BPG	TO	PPG
2007–08	Lamar	30	31.0	42.4	30.8	79.8	7.1	1.6	0.8	0.7	3.3	16.0	
**Career**		30	31.0	42.4	30.8	79.8	7.1	1.6	0.8	0.7	3.3	16.0	

== National team ==
Abalde started playing with Spain's youth teams at 14, winning a total of five medals from 2003 to 2009. She made her debut with the senior team in 2008, and went to play the 2008 Summer Olympics when she was 19 years old. Up to 2021, she had 68 caps with 2.5 PPG, participating in 2 Olympic Games and 2 EuroBasket Women:

- 4th 2003 FIBA Europe Under-16 Championship (youth)
- 2004 FIBA Europe Under-16 Championship (youth)
- 2005 FIBA Europe Under-16 Championship (youth) (All-Tournament Team)
- 2006 FIBA Europe Under-18 Championship (youth)
- 2007 FIBA Europe Under-18 Championship (youth)
- 4th 2007 FIBA Under-19 World Championship (youth)
- 5th 2008 Summer Olympics
- 2009 FIBA Europe Under-20 Championship (youth) (MVP)
- 2009 Eurobasket
- 2019 Eurobasket
- 6th 2020 Summer Olympics
