= 2015 Copa de la Reina de Baloncesto =

Copa de la Reina 2015
- League: Copa de la Reina
- Sport: Basketball
- Duration: 14–15 February 2015
- Games: 3
- Teams: 4
- TV partner(s): Teledeporte, FEBTv

Final
- Champions: Perfumerías Avenida
- Runners-up: Conquero Huelva Wagen
- Finals MVP: (United States) Angelica Robinson

Copa de la Reina seasons
- ← 2014 2016 →

The Copa de la Reina de Baloncesto 2015 was the 53rd edition of the Spanish Queen's Basketball Cup. It is managed by the Spanish Basketball Federation – FEB and was held in Torrejón de Ardoz, in the Pabellón Jorge Garbajosa on February 14–15, 2015.

Perfumerías Avenida won its fifth Copa de la Reina title.

== Qualified teams ==
On November 14, the Spanish Basketball Federation awarded the organization of the Cup to the city of Torrejón de Ardoz, qualifying Rivas Ecópolis as host team. In accordance with the competition rules, the three top teams at the end of first leg of the LFB Regular Season, would qualify for the tournament.

=== Standings after Round 13 ===
Pos	Team	Pld	W	L	PF	PA	PD	Pts	Qualification or relegation
1	Perfumerías Avenida	13	12	1	956	677	+279	25	Qualified
2	Spar Citylift Girona	13	12	1	916	797	+119	25	Qualified
3	CB Conquero Huelva Wagen	13	11	2	910	787	+123	24	Qualified
4	Cadí La Seu	13	9	4	781	772	+9	22	
5	Embutidos Pajariel Bembibre	13	8	5	834	804	+30	21	
6	Gernika Bizkaia	13	7	6	878	848	+30	20	
7	Zamarat	13	6	7	879	931	−52	19	
8	Rivas Ecópolis	13	5	8	846	849	−3	18	Host
9	Universitario Ferrol	13	5	8	837	887	−50	18	
10	IDK Gipuzkoa UPV	13	5	8	782	875	−93	18	
11	GranCanaria.com	13	4	9	894	901	−7	17	
12	Mann-Filter	13	3	10	819	965	−146	16	
13	Campus Promete	13	2	11	832	931	−99	15	
14	CB Al-Qázeres Extremadura	13	2	11	755	895	−140	15	

== Draw ==
The draw was held in Torrejón de Ardoz on January 26, 2015.

Perfumerías Avenida and Spar Citylift Girona were the seeded teams, who were drawn against Rivas Ecópolis and CB Conquero Huelva Wagen respectively

== Bracket ==
Semifinals
1	Perfumerías Avenida	74
4	Rivas Ecópolis	47
2	Spar Citylift Girona	69
3	Conquero Huelva Wagen	70

Final
1	Perfumerías Avenida	66
3	Conquero Huelva Wagen	62

=== Final ===
Teledeporte

February 15
15:45 (UTC+1)

Report
Stats

Perfumerías Avenida	66–62	Conquero Huelva Wagen
Scoring by quarter: 17–18, 20–15, 9–20, 20–9
Pts: Robinson 20; Rebs: Režan 15; Asts: Xargay 5 PIR: Robinson 27		Pts: Davis 15; Rebs: Pascua 7 Asts: Asurmendi, Elonu 4 PIR: Elonu 15

Pabellón Jorge Garbajosa, Torrejón de Ardoz
Attendance: 2,500
Referees: Gómez López, Zafra Guerra

2015 Copa de la Reina winners
(Castile and León)
Perfumerías Avenida
Fifth title
