= 2015–16 Liga Femenina de Baloncesto =

Liga Femenina
- Season: 2015–16
- Duration: September 2015–April 2016
- Games played: 182 (Regular season); 6–9 (Playoffs)
- Teams: 14
- TV partner: FEBtv.com (streaming)

Regular season
- Season MVP: (Nigeria) Adaora Elonu
- Relegated: Conquero Huelva Wagen (folded); Añares Rioja ISB

Finals
- Champions: Perfumerías Avenida (4th title)
- Runners-up: Spar Citylift Girona
- Semi-finalists: Conquero Huelva Wagen; Mann-Filter

Statistical leaders
Points	(Paraguay) Paola Ferrari	19.15
Rebounds	(United States) Talia Caldwell	11.3
Assists	(Spain) Arantxa Gómez	5.39
Index Rating	(Nigeria) Adaora Elonu	21.68

The 2015–16 Liga Femenina de Baloncesto was the 53rd edition of the Spanish premier women's basketball championship. Regular season started on 26 September 2015 and will finish on 26 March 2016. The playoffs started on 30 March and finished no later than 23 April.

Perfumerías Avenida won its fourth title after defeating Spar Citylift Girona 2–1 in the Championship Finals.

== Competition format ==
The 14 teams play a home and away round-robin. The three first teams classified at the end of the first leg, together with the designated host play the Copa de la Reina de Baloncesto. If the host finishes between the three first teams, the fourth classified will also .

At the end of the regular season, the four first teams qualify for the playoffs, on a best of three series. The two last classified teams are relegated to Liga Femenina 2.

The League champion, the Cup champion, and the first team classified at the end of the regular season have guaranteed their participation in European competitions for the season 2016-2017.

The League champion and the Cup champion (or the Cup runner-up if the two first coincide), play for the following season's Supercopa of Spain of the following season.

== Participating clubs ==
At the end of the 2014–15 season, Campus Promete and CB Al-Qazeres Extremadura were relegated to Liga Femenina 2. Likewise, CREF ¡Hola! and Plenilunio Distrito Olímpico promoted. However, only the first one managed to gather the requirements for registration, therefore Campus Promete was offered the vacant spot. In addition, Rivas Ecópolis asked for relegation due to economic reasons. Its spot was filled by Iraurgi Saski Baloia, team that had not been admitted in Liga Femenina 2 before.

Location of teams in 2015–16 Liga Femenina
Location of teams from the Canary Islands in 2015–16 Liga Femenina (Canary Islands)

Team	City	Arena	2014–15
Spar Citylift Girona	Girona	Fontajau	1st
Perfumerías Avenida	Salamanca	Würzburg	2nd
Conquero Huelva Wagen	Huelva	Andrés Estrada	3rd
Cadí La Seu	La Seu d'Urgell	Palau d'Esports	4th
Embutidos Pajariel Bembibre	Bembibre	Bembibre Arena	5th
Gernika Bizkaia	Guernica	Maloste	6th
Quesos El Pastor de la Polvorosa	Zamora	Ángel Nieto	8th
IDK Gipuzkoa	San Sebastián	José Antonio Gasca	9th
Spar Gran Canaria	Las Palmas	La Paterna	10th
Star Center–Uni Ferrol	Ferrol	Esteiro	11th
Mann-Filter	Zaragoza	Eduardo Lastrada	12th
Campus Promete	Logroño	C.D.M. Lobete	13th
CREF ¡Hola!	Madrid	Canal de Isabel II	1st (LF2)
Añares Rioja ISB	Azpeitia	Polideportivo Municipal	Promotion to LF2

== Regular season ==
=== League table ===
Pos	Team	Pld	W	L	PF	PA	PD	Pts	Qualification or relegation
1	Perfumerías Avenida	26	25	1	2019	1521	+498	51	Qualification to playoffs
2	Conquero Huelva Wagen	26	19	7	1921	1769	+152	45	Qualification to playoffs, expelled for season 2016-17
3	Spar Citylift Girona	26	17	9	1811	1643	+168	43	Qualification to playoffs
4	Mann-Filter	26	17	9	1819	1681	+138	43	Qualification to playoffs
5	Cadí La Seu	26	17	9	1841	1616	+225	43	
6	Gernika Bizkaia	26	16	10	1885	1734	+151	42	
7	CREF ¡Hola!	26	11	15	1736	1836	−100	37	
8	Embutidos Pajariel Bembibre	26	11	15	1633	1777	−144	37	
9	Quesos El Pastor de la Polvorosa	26	11	15	1718	1752	−34	37	
10	IDK Gipuzkoa	26	11	15	1635	1661	−26	37	
11	Star Center–Uni Ferrol	26	10	16	1675	1805	−130	36	
12	Campus Promete	26	8	18	1729	1858	−129	34	
13	Spar Gran Canaria	26	7	19	1745	1924	−179	33	Spared from relegation due to vacance berths
14	Añares Rioja ISB	26	2	24	1528	2118	−590	28	Relegation to LF 2

Source: Liga Femenina

=== Positions by round ===
The table lists the positions of teams after completion of each round.

Team \ Round	1	2	3	4	5	6	7	8	9	10	11	12	13*	14	15	16	17	18	19	20	21	22	23	24	25	26	F	
Perfumerias Avenida	14	9	5	2	2	1	1	1	1	1	1*	1	1	1	1	1	1	1	1	1	1	1	1	1	1	1	1	EuroLeague
Spar Citylift Girona	8	6	4	1	1	2	2	2	2	2	2	2	3*	2	4	4	4	3	4	5	4	5	4	4	3	3	2	EuroCup
CB Conquero Huelva Wagen	1	2	6	10	6	4	4	4	3	3	3	3	2*	3	2	2	2	2	2	2	2	2	2	2	2	2	3	Euroleague (as Cup Champions, renounced), expelled
Mann-Filter	11	4	2	6	9	7	5	7	6	5	4	4	5	5	3	3	3	4	3	4	3	4	3	3	4	4	4	Eurocup (although renounced)
Cadí La Seu	10	13	10	11	8	6	7	9	7	7	7	7	6	6	6	6	5	5	5	3	5	3	5	5	5	5		
Gernika Bizkaia	4	8	7	3	3	3	3	3	4	6	5	5	4	4	5	5	6	6	6	6	6	6	6	6	6	6		
CREF ¡Hola!	7	7	11	8	5	8	9	12	12	9	8	8	8	9	10	10	10	10	11	11	11	11	11	11	9	7		
Embutidos Pajariel Bembibre	5	3	1	4	4	5	6	5	5	4	6	6	7	7	7	7	8	7	7	7	7	9	7	7	7	8		
Quesos El Pastor de la Polvorosa	2	1	3	9	11	11	10	11	11	12	13	12	10	12	11	11	11	12	10	9	8	8	8	8	10	9		
IDK Gipuzkoa	13	5	9	7	10	12	12	10	10	11	12	11	9*	8	8	9	9	9	9	10	10	10	10	10	11	10		
Star Center-Uni Ferrol	6	10	8	5	7	9	11	8	9	10	11	9	11	13	9	8	7	8	8	8	9	7	9	9	8	11		
Campus Promete	9	12	13	12	12	10	8	6	8	8	9	10	12	10	12	12	12	13	12	12	12	12	12	12	12	12		
Spar Gran Canaria	3	11	12	13	13	13	13	13	13	13	10	13	13	11	13	13	13	11	13	13	13	13	13	13	13	13		
Añares Rioja ISB	12	14	14	14	14	14	14	14	14	14	14	14	14	14	14	14	14	14	14	14	14	14	14	14	14	14		

Leader
2016 Copa de la Reina berth
Playoffs berth
FIBA Europe competitions
Relegation to 2016–17; Liga Femenina 2

- Standings after Round 13 determine the qualified teams for the Copa de la Reina.
  (*) Clinched Copa de la Reina spot. On December 17 the Spanish Basketball Federation awarded the organization of the Cup to the city of San Sebastián, qualifying IDK Gipuzkoa as host team.
Last updated: 20 March, (R24)

== Playoffs ==
Semifinals
1	Perfumerías Avenida	78	88
4	Mann Filter	55	63
2	Conquero Huelva Wagen	72	71
3	Spar Citylift Girona	79	81

Finals
1	Perfumerías Avenida	72	75	60
3	Spar Citylift Girona	60	81	57

=== Semifinals ===
==== (1) Perfumerías Avenida vs. (4) Mann-Filter ====
FEBTv

March 30
20:30

Boxscore

Perfumerías Avenida	78–55	Mann Filter
Scoring by quarter: 29–13, 19–13, 16–16, 14–13
Pts: L Rodríguez, Beard 15; Rebs: Ndour 8 Asts: L Rodríguez 4 PIR: L Rodríguez 23		Pts: Ferrari 16; Rebs: Ocete 5 Asts: Ocete 4 PIR: Lo Sylla, Liepkalne 11

Pabellón de Wurzburg, Salamanca
Attendance: 2,800
Referees: Pagán Baró, Padrós Feliú

FEBTv

April 8
20:15

Boxscore

Mann Filter	63–88	Perfumerías Avenida
Scoring by quarter: 16–18, 16–23, 9–17, 22–30
Pts: Ferrari 23; Rebs: Pascua 13; Asts: Ocete 5 PIR: Pascua 20		Pts: Mărginean 17; Rebs: Ndour 9 Asts: S Domínguez 5 PIR: Kobryn, Gemelos 17
Perfumerías Avenida wins the series, 2–0

Pabellón Eduardo Lastrada, Zaragoza
Attendance: 810
Referees: Uruñuela Uruñuela, García Rodríguez

==== (2) Conquero Huelva Wagen vs. (3) Spar Citylift Girona ====
FEBTv

March 30
21:00

Boxscore

Conquero Huelva Wagen	72–79	Spar Citylift Girona
Scoring by quarter: 16–18, 20–13, 20–19, 16–29
Pts: Peters 22; Rebs: Elonu 14; Asts: Neves 8 PIR: Elonu 29		Pts: Ibekwe 29; Rebs: Ibekwe 14; Asts: Lucas 5 PIR: Ibekwe 32

Polideportivo Andrés Estrada, Huelva
Attendance: 1,800
Referees: Lucas de Lucas, Mendoza Holgado

FEBTv

April 3
19:00

Boxscore

Spar Citylift Girona	81–71	Conquero Huelva Wagen
Scoring by quarter: 26–12, 21–23, 19–16, 15–20
Pts: Givens, Ibekwe 18; Rebs: Coulibaly 5 Asts: Jordana 5 PIR: Givens 19		Pts: Peters 24; Rebs: Elonu, Caldwell 8 Asts: Buch 5 PIR: Elonu 29
Spar Citylift Girona wins the series, 2–0

Palau Girona-Fontajau, Girona
Attendance: 2,000
Referees: Terreros San Miguel, Torres Sánchez

=== Final ===
==== (1) Perfumerías Avenida vs. (3) Spar Citylift Girona ====
FEBTv

April 13
20:30

Boxscore

Perfumerías Avenida	72–60	Spar Citylift Girona
Scoring by quarter: 15–20, 17–20, 14–15, 26–5
Pts: S Domínguez 16; Rebs: Beard 5 Asts: S Domínguez 5 PIR: Beard 17		Pts: Givens 21; Rebs: Coulibaly 14; Asts: Jordana 2 PIR: Coulibaly 21

Pabellón de Wurzburg, Salamanca
Attendance: 3,000
Referees: Morales Ruiz, Pazos Pazos

FEBTv

April 17
20:00

Boxscore

Spar Citylift Girona	81–75 (OT)	Perfumerías Avenida
Scoring by quarter: 13–20, 22–16, 19–13, 14–19, Overtime: 13–7
Pts: Givens 26; Rebs: Spanou 16; Asts: Jordana 6 PIR: Givens 31		Pts: Gidden 19; Rebs: Gidden 11; Asts: Domínguez 5 PIR: Gidden 24

Palau Girona-Fontajau, Girona
Attendance: 3,500
Referees: Lucas de Lucas, Gómez López

Teledeporte

April 23
19:00

Boxscore

Perfumerías Avenida	60–57	Spar Citylift Girona
Scoring by quarter: 24–8, 14–16, 11–16, 11–17
Pts: Beard, Ndour 12; Rebs: Ndour 7 Asts: Domínguez 7 PIR: Beard 18		Pts: Coulibaly 15; Rebs: Coulibaly 11; Asts: Jordana 6 PIR: Coulibaly 20
Perfumerías Avenida wins the series, 2–1

Pabellón de Wurzburg, Salamanca
Referees: Uruñuela Uruñuela, Muñoz García

2015–16 Liga Femenina de Baloncesto winners
(Castile and León)
Perfumerías Avenida
Fourth title

== Stats leaders in regular season ==
=== Points ===
Rk	Name	Team	Games	Points	PPG
1	(Paraguay) Paola Ferrari	Mann-Filter	26	498	19.1
2	(United States) Taysha Pye	Spar Gran Canaria	20	371	18.5
3	(Nigeria) Adaora Elonu	Conquero Huelva Wagen	19	343	18.0
4	(United States) Lyndra Weaver	CREF ¡Hola!	26	441	17.0
5	(United States) Cierra Bravard	IDK Gipuzkoa	25	415	16.6

=== Rebounds ===
Rk	Name	Team	Games	Rebounds	RPG
1	(United States) Talia Caldwell	Conquero Huelva Wagen	23	260	11.3
2	(United States) Cierra Bravard	IDK Gipuzkoa	25	272	10.9
3	(United States) Lyndra Weaver	CREF ¡Hola!	26	263	10.1
4	(United States) Shakeya Leary	CREF ¡Hola!	26	249	9.6
5	(Bulgaria) Jaklin Zlatanova	Mann-Filter	26	235	9.0

=== Assists ===
Rk	Name	Team	Games	Assists	APG
1	(Spain) Arantxa Gómez	IDK Gipuzkoa	23	124	5.4
2	(Spain) Ana Suárez	Star Center–Uni Ferrol	26	131	5.0
3	(Spain) Anna Gómez	Embutidos Pajariel Bembibre	26	123	4.7
4	(Spain) Gaby Ocete	Mann-Filter	26	120	4.6
5	(United States) Taysha Pye	Spar Gran Canaria	20	89	4.45

=== Performance Index Rating ===
Rk	Name	Team	Games	Rating	PIR
1	(Nigeria) Adaora Elonu	Conquero Huelva Wagen	19	412	21.7
2	(United States) Talia Caldwell	Conquero Huelva Wagen	23	464	20.2
3	(United States) Cierra Bravard	IDK Gipuzkoa	25	500	20.0
4	(United States) Lyndra Weaver	CREF ¡Hola!	26	500	19.2
5	(Bulgaria) Jaklin Zlatanova	Mann-Filter	26	483	18.6
