= 2014–15 Liga Femenina de Baloncesto =

2014–15 season
- League: Liga Femenina
- Sport: Basketball
- Duration: October 2014–March 2015 (regular season); April 2015 (playoff)
- Games: 182 (regular season)
- Teams: 14
- TV partner(s): Teledeporte, FEBTv

Regular season
- Season champions: Perfumerías Avenida
- Season MVP: Ify Ibekwe (Spar Citylift Girona)
- Top scorer: Bernice Mosby (Gernika Bizkaia)

Finals
- Champions: Spar Citylift Girona
- Runners-up: Perfumerías Avenida

Liga Femenina seasons
- ← 2013–14 2015–16 →

The 2014–15 Liga Femenina de Baloncesto is the 52nd edition of the Spanish premier women's basketball championship. Regular season started on 15 October 2014 and finished on 28 March. Championship playoff will begin on 4 April with Semifinal matches.

== Competition format ==
The 14 teams play each other on a round robin format. The three qualified teams after the first half of the season and the host one will play the Copa de la Reina. If the host team finishes in the top three, the fourth qualified will join the competition.

After the Regular Season, the top four teams play the play-offs, featuring semi-finals and Finals on a best-of-3 series. The two bottom teams will be relegated to Liga Femenina 2

The League champion, Cup champion and first team after the Regular Season have a guaranteed spot in FIBA Europe competitions for the 2015-2016.

== 2014–15 season teams ==
The competition was expanded from 12 to 14 clubs. At the end of season 2013-2014, GDKO Bizkaia was relegated and CB Ciudad de Burgos disbanded. Gernika Bizkaia, as Liga Femenina 2 champion, together with CB Al-Qazeres Extremadora (2nd), Campus Promete (4th) and Universitario Ferrol (5th) were promoted.

Liga Femenina 2014–15 teams
Canary Islands

Team	City	Arena (seats)	Year estab.	2013–14
Rivas Ecópolis	Rivas-Vaciamadrid	Cerro del Telégrafo (1,000)	1993	1st
Perfumerías Avenida	Salamanca	Pabellón de Wurzburg (3,500)	1988	2nd
GranCanaria.com	Las Palmas	La Paterna (1,000)	1980	3rd
Embutidos Pajariel Bembibre	Bembibre	Bembibre Arena (1,500)	1995	4th
Spar Citylift Girona	Gerona	Girona-Fontajau (5,500)	2005	5th
Cadí La Seu	La Seu d'Urgell	Palau d'Esports (800)	1965	7th
IDK Gipuzkoa UPV	San Sebastián	José Antonio Gasca (2,500)	2005	8th
Mann-Filter	Zaragoza	Eduardo Lastrada (810)	1948	9th
Conquero Huelva Wagen	Huelva	Andrés Estrada (2,800)	1999	10th
Zamarat	Zamora	Ángel Nieto (1,500)	1994	11th
Gernika Bizkaia	Guernica	Maloste (550)	1996	LF2 Champion
Al-Qázeres Extremadura	Cáceres	Juan Serrano Macayo (1,200)	2008	LF2 2nd
Campus Promete	Logroño	CDM Lobete (1,100)	1992	LF2 4th
Star Center–Uni Ferrol	Ferrol	Esteiro (450)	1997	LF2 5th

== League table ==
Pos	Team	Pld	W	L	PF	PA	PD	Pts	Qualification or relegation
1	Perfumerías Avenida	26	24	2	1907	1475	+432	50	Qualification to playoffs
2	Spar Citylift Girona	26	23	3	1887	1631	+256	49	Qualification to playoffs
3	Conquero Huelva Wagen	26	18	8	1741	1563	+178	44	Qualification to playoffs
4	Cadí La Seu	26	18	8	1664	1584	+80	44	Qualification to playoffs
5	Embutidos Pajariel Bembibre	26	15	11	1682	1646	+36	41	
6	Gernika Bizkaia	26	14	12	1840	1728	+112	40	
7	Rivas Ecópolis	26	12	14	1701	1742	−41	38	Asked for relegation to LF 2
8	Zamarat	26	10	16	1687	1794	−107	36	
9	IDK Gipuzkoa UPV	26	9	17	1568	1726	−158	35	
10	GranCanaria.com	26	9	17	1763	1849	−86	35	
11	Star Center–Uni Ferrol	26	9	17	1620	1804	−184	35	
12	Mann-Filter	26	9	17	1657	1763	−106	35	
13	Campus Promete	26	6	20	1659	1847	−188	32	Spared from relegation due to vacance berths
14	Al-Qázeres Extremadura	26	6	20	1573	1797	−224	32	Relegation to LF 2

Updated to match(es) played on 28 March 2015. Source: Liga Femenina

== Playoffs ==
Semifinals
1	Perfumerías Avenida	78	67	64
4	Cadí La Seu	60	75	51
2	Spar Citylift Girona	56	66
3	Conquero Huelva Wagen	52	49

Final
1	Perfumerías Avenida	70	54
2	Spar Citylift Girona	85	72

=== Semifinals ===
==== (1) Perfumerías Avenida vs. (4) Cadí La Seu ====
FEBTv

April 4
18:00

Box Score

Perfumerías Avenida 78, Cadí La Seu 60
Scoring by quarter: 22–21, 13–14, 13–15, 30–10
Pts: Režan 20; Rebs: Režan 12; Asts: Ferrari 5 PIR: Režan 29	Pts: Ben Abdelkader 13; Rebs: Madu 7 Asts: A Suárez 2 PIR: Madu 11

Pabellón de Wurzburg, Salamanca
Attendance: 2,800
Referees: García León, Terreros San Miguel

FEBTv

April 8
20:15

Box Score

Cadí La Seu 75, Perfumerías Avenida 67
Scoring by quarter: 15–19, 19–17, 24–18, 17–13
Pts: Ben Abdelkader 15; Rebs: L. Gil 9 Asts: L. Gil 3 PIR: L. Gil 23	Pts: M. Fernández 16; Rebs: Robinson 9 Asts: Xargay 7 PIR: Režan 16

Palau d'Esports, La Seu d'Urgell
Attendance: 1,100
Referees: Muñoz García, Torres Sánchez

FEBTv

April 11
18:00

Box Score

Perfumerías Avenida 64, Cadí La Seu 51
Scoring by quarter: 19–15, 16–17, 16–10, 13–9
Pts: M Fernández, Robinson 14; Rebs: Režan 10; Asts: Xargay 8 PIR: Režan 19	Pts: T Pérez 14; Rebs: four players 4 Asts: Suárez 3 PIR: T Pérez 10
Perfumerías Avenida wins the series, 2–1

Pabellón de Wurzburg, Salamanca
Referees: Uruñuela Uruñuela, Quintas Álvarez

==== (2) Spar Citylift Girona vs. (3) Conquero Huelva Wagen ====
Teledeporte

April 5
19:00

Box Score

Spar Citylift Girona 56, Conquero Huelva Wagen 52
Scoring by quarter: 10–10, 15–19, 21–12, 10–11
Pts: Gidden 20; Rebs: Ibekwe 11; Asts: Jordana 5 PIR: Gidden 31	Pts: Davis 14; Rebs: Davis 7 Asts: Asurmendi, Pascua 3 PIR: Davis 16

Palau Girona-Fontajau, Girona
Attendance: 2,000
Referees: Gómez López, Zafra Guerra

FEBTv

April 9
21:00

Box Score

Conquero Huelva Wagen 49, Spar Citylift Girona 66
Scoring by quarter: 9–18, 12–11, 8–14, 20–23
Pts: Asurmendi, Elonu 10; Rebs: Elonu 7 Asts: Asurmendi 5 PIR: Elonu 18	Pts: Ibekwe 22; Rebs: Ibekwe, Gidden 10; Asts: Jordana 5 PIR: Ibekwe 24
Spar Citylift Girona wins the series, 2–0

Polideportivo Andrés Estrada, Huelva
Attendance: 3,000
Referees: Morales García Alcaide, Zamorano Sánchez

=== Final ===
==== (1) Perfumerías Avenida vs. (2) Spar Citylift Girona ====
Teledeporte

April 18
19:30

Box Score

Perfumerías Avenida 70, Spar Citylift Girona 85
Scoring by quarter: 19–21, 15–20, 15–26, 21–18
Pts: Robinson 17; Rebs: Robinson 14; Asts: Xargay 5 PIR: Robinson 24	Pts: Jordana 21; Rebs: Ibekwe 12; Asts: Ibekwe 5 PIR: Ibekwe 22

Pabellón de Wurzburg, Salamanca
Referees: Morales Ruiz, López Herrada

Teledeporte

April 23
19:30

Box Score

Spar Citylift Girona 72, Perfumerías Avenida 54
Scoring by quarter: 22–16, 19–12, 17–10, 14–16
Pts: Ibekwe 22; Rebs: Ibekwe 10; Asts: Jordana 9 PIR: Ibekwe 27	Pts: Xargay 13; Rebs: Robinson 9 Asts: M Fernández 13; PIR: Režan 10
Spar Citylift Girona wins series, 2–0

Palau Girona-Fontajau, Girona
Attendance: 5,000
Referees: Lucas de Lucas, Bravo Loroño

== Positions by round ==
The table lists the positions of teams after completion of each round.

Leader
2015 Copa de la Reina berth
Playoffs berth
FIBA Europe competitions
Relegation to 2015–16; Liga Femenina 2

Team \ Round	1	2	3	4	5	6	7	8	9	10	11	12	13(*)	14	15	16	17	18	19	20	21	22	23	24	25	26
Perfumerias Avenida	8	5	3	4	2	2	2	1	1	1	1	1	1	2	2	2	2	2	1	1	1	1(Q)	1	1	1	1
Spar Citylift Girona	7	4	2	2	1	1	1	3	3	3	3	2	2	1	1	1	1	1	3	2	2	2(Q)	2	2	2	2
CB Conquero Huelva Wagen	12	9	5	3	3	4	3	2	2	2	2	3	3	3	3	3	3	3	2	3	3	3	3(Q)	3	3	3
Cadí La Seu	11	13	12	10	7	5	5	4	5	4	5	5	4	4	4	4	4	4	4	4	4	4	4(Q)	4	4	4
Embutidos Pajariel Bembibre	2	6	11	6	5	6	6	6	6	6	4	4	5	5	6	6	6	6	6	6	5	5	5	5	5	5
Gernika Bizkaia	1	2	1	1	4	3	4	5	4	5	6	6	6	6	5	5	5	5	5	5	6	6	6	6	6	6
Rivas Ecopolis*	9	12	13	14	11	12	13	10(*)	10	11	10	10	8	7	7	8	7	7	7	7	7	7	7	7	7	7
CD Zamarat	6	7	8	7	9	11	7	7	7	8	7	7	7	8	8	9	8	8	8	8	8	8	8	8	8	8
Gipuzkoa UPV	14	14	9	12	13	13	12	13	12	9	8	9	10	9	10	11	10	10	9	9	9	9	9	9	9	9
GranCanaria.com	10	8	4	5	8	10	10	11	8	10	11	11	11	11	11	7	9	9	11	11	10	10	12	10	12	10
Star Center-Uni Ferrol	4	1	6	9	10	7	8	8	9	7	9	8	9	10	9	10	11	11	10	10	11	11	10	11	10	11
Mann-Filter	3	3	7	8	6	8	9	9	11	12	12	12	12	12	12	12	12	12	12	12	12	12	11	12	11	12
Campus Promete	13	11	14	13	14	14	14	14	14	14	13	13	13	13	13	13	13	13	13	13	13	14	14	13	13	13
CB Al-Qazeres	5	10	10	11	12	9	11	12	13	13	14	14	14	14	14	14	14	14	14	14	14	13	13	14	14	14

Last updated: 16 Mar 2015, after Round 22
* Standings after Round 13 determine the qualified teams for the Copa de la Reina.
On November 14, the Spanish Basketball Federation awarded the organization of the Cup to the city of Torrejón de Ardoz, qualifying Rivas Ecópolis as host team.
(Q) marks the Round when the team qualified mathematically for the playoffs.

== Stats leaders in regular season ==
=== Points ===
Rk	Name	Team	Games	Points	PPG
1	(United States) Bernice Mosby	Gernika Bizkaia	26	499	19.2
2	(United States) Robin Parks	GranCanaria.com	26	472	18.1
3	(United States) Ify Ibekwe	Spar Citylift Girona	25	410	16.4
4	(United States) Haley Peters	Star Center-Uni Ferrol	26	411	15.8
5	(Jamaica) Vanessa Gidden	Spar Citylift Girona	21	317	15.1

=== Rebounds ===
Rk	Name	Team	Games	Rebounds	RPG
1	(United States) Samarie Walker	GranCanaria.com	13	149	11.5
2	(Jamaica) Vanessa Gidden	Spar Citylift Girona	21	216	10.3
3	(United States) Ify Ibekwe	Spar Citylift Girona	25	253	10.1
4	(United States) Angelica Robinson	Perfumerías Avenida	24	224	9.3
5	(United States) Lyndra Weaver	Rivas Ecópolis	22	193	8.8

=== Assists ===
Rk	Name	Team	Games	Assists	APG
1	(Spain) Noemí Jordana	Spar Citylift Girona	26	122	4.7
2	(Spain) Arantxa Gómez	IDK Gipuzkoa UPV	22	99	4.5
3	(Spain) Gaby Ocete	Rivas Ecópolis	26	116	4.5
4	(Spain) María Asurmendi	CB Conquero Huelva Wagen	26	112	4.3
5	(Spain) Anna Gómez	Embutidos Pajariel Bembibre	26	111	4.3

=== Performance Index Rating ===
Rk	Name	Team	Games	Rating	PIR
1	(United States) Ify Ibekwe	Spar Citylift Girona	25	594	23.8
2	(United States) Bernice Mosby	Gernika Bizkaia	26	577	22.2
3	(United States) Angelica Robinson	Perfumerías Avenida	24	440	18.3
4	(Jamaica) Vanessa Gidden	Spar Citylift Girona	21	383	18.2
5	(United States) Samarie Walker	GranCanaria.com	13	233	17.9
