= 2014 Copa de la Reina de Baloncesto =

Copa de la Reina 2014
- League: Copa de la Reina
- Sport: Basketball
- Duration: 22–23 February 2014
- Games: 3
- Teams: 4
- TV partner(s): Teledeporte, FEBTv

Final
- Champions: Perfumerías Avenida
- Runners-up: Rivas Ecópolis
- Finals MVP: (United States) Angelica Robinson

Copa de la Reina seasons
- ← 2013 2015 →

The Copa de la Reina de Baloncesto 2014 was the 52nd edition of the Spanish Queen's Basketball Cup. It is managed by the Spanish Basketball Federation – FEB and was held in Torrejón de Ardoz, in the Pabellón Jorge Garbajosa on February 22–23, 2014. Rivas Ecópolis was the host team. Perfumerías Avenida won its fourth Copa de la Reina title.

== Venue ==
Torrejón de Ardoz
Pabellón Jorge Garbajosa
Capacity: 2,700

== Qualified teams ==
Besides, Rivas Ecópolis who was designated host of the tournament, the other three top teams at the end of first leg of the LFB Regular Season, qualified for the

#	Teams	P	W	L	PF	PA
1	Perfumerías Avenida	11	9	2	807	663
2	Rivas Ecópolis (H)	11	8	3	768	630
3	Gran Canaria 2014	11	8	3	873	799
4	Beroil Ciudad de Burgos	11	6	5	648	618

(H) Qualified as Host

== Draw ==
The draw was held in Zamora on January 24, 2014.

== Bracket ==
Semifinals
1	Perfumerías Avenida	66
3	Gran Canaria 2014	58
2	Rivas Ecópolis	65
4	Beroil Ciudad de Burgos	52

Final
1	Perfumerías Avenida	69
2	Rivas Ecópolis	67

=== Semi finals ===
Teledeporte

February 22
12:05 (UTC+1)

Report
Stats

Perfumerías Avenida	66–58	Gran Canaria 2014
Scoring by quarter: 18–19, 13–12, 17–16, 18–11
Pts: Murphy 19; Rebs: Robinson 13; Asts: Xargay 5 PIR: Robinson 23		Pts: Davis 17; Rebs: Ndour 12; Asts: Chambers 5 PIR: Davis 19

Pabellón Jorge Garbajosa, Torrejón de Ardoz
Attendance: 1,000
Referees: Terreros San Miguel, Quintas Álvarez

FEBTv

February 22
17:00 (UTC+1)

Report
Stats

Rivas Ecópolis	65–52	Beroil Ciudad de Burgos
Scoring by quarter: 11–11, 21–10, 17–16, 16–15
Pts: Eldenbrink 15; Rebs: Nicholls 11; Asts: four players 3 PIR: Nicholls, Hassell 10		Pts: Elonu 16; Rebs: Bahí 14; Asts: Argüello, Vilaró 3 PIR: Elonu 17

Pabellón Jorge Garbajosa, Torrejón de Ardoz
Attendance: 2,000
Referees: Gómez López, Mas Cagide

=== Final ===
Teledeporte

February 23
16:30 (UTC+1)

Report
Stats

Perfumerías Avenida	69–67	Rivas Ecópolis
Scoring by quarter: 16–9, 8–16, 23–16, 14–20
Pts: Murphy, Robinson 18; Rebs: Robinson 11; Asts: Xargay 8 PIR: Robinson 24		Pts: Eldebrink 24; Rebs: Nicholls 14; Asts: Ocete 7 PIR: Nicholls 23

Pabellón Jorge Garbajosa, Torrejón de Ardoz
Attendance: 2,600
Referees: Morales Ruiz, Bravo Loroño

2014 Copa de la Reina winners
(Castile and León)
Perfumerías Avenida
Fourth title
