= Laura Herrera (basketball) =

Spanish basketball player

CB Bembibre
- Position: Center
- League: Liga Femenina

Personal information
- Born: July 11, 1989 (age 37) Santa Cruz de Tenerife, Spain
- Listed height: 6 ft 2 in (1.88 m)

Career information
- Playing career: 2007–present

Career history
- 2007–2010: Estudiantes
- 2010–2011: Rivas Ecópolis
- 2011–2012: Ciudad de Burgos
- 2012–2013: Navarra
- 2013–2015: Mann-Filter
- 2015–present: Bembibre

Laura Herrera Boxo (Santa Cruz de Tenerife, 11 July 1989) is a Spanish basketball player, who plays as center. She currently plays in CB Bembibre in the Spanish first division. She is a member of the Spanish national senior team, besides having represented Spain in under-age categories.

== Awards and accomplishments ==
- 2004 European champion U16 (Italy)
- 2005 European champion U16 (Poland)
- 2006 European champion U18 (Spain)
- 2007 Silver medal European U18 (Serbia)
- 2007 4th position World U19 (Bratislava)
- 2008 4th position European U20 (Italy)
- 2009 Silver medal European U20 (Poland)
- 2011 Copa de la Reina champion (Rivas Ecópolis)
- 2015 Bronze Medal Eurobasket (Hungary and Romania)
