= 2012–13 Liga Femenina de Baloncesto =

2012–13 ACB season
- League: Liga Femenina
- Sport: Basketball
- Number of games: 110 (regular season); 11 (playoffs)
- Number of teams: 11
- TV partner(s): Teledeporte, FEBTv

Liga Femenina playoffs
- Champions: Perfumerías Avenida
- Runners-up: Rivas Ecópolis

Liga Femenina seasons
- ← 2011–12 2013–14 →

The 2012–13 Liga Femenina de Baloncesto was the 50th edition of the Spanish premier women's basketball championship. The regular season started on 12 October 2012 and finished on 30 March 2013. The top six teams played the championship playoffs during April. Eleven teams took part in the regular season championship.

Perfumerías Avenida won its third title after defeating Rivas Ecópolis in the Finals.

== Competition format ==
Top three teams in the standings at mid season and the host team play the Copa de la Reina. If the host team finishes in the top three, the fourth qualified will join the competition.

After the Regular Season, the top six teams play the play-offs. Top two teams qualify directly to semifinals while the teams 3rd–6th begin to play on quarter-finals.

== Regular season table ==
#	Team	P	W	L	PF	PA	PT	Qualification or relegation
1	Rivas Ecópolis	20	19	1	1490	1172	39	Qualified for semifinals
2	Perfumerías Avenida	20	17	3	1485	1281	37	Qualified for semifinals
3	Spar UniGirona	20	15	5	1379	1198	35	Qualified for quarterfinals
4	Cadí-ICG Software	20	12	8	1358	1359	32	Qualified for quarterfinals
5	Beroil Ciudad de Burgos	20	8	12	1316	1333	28	Qualified for quarterfinals
6	UNB Obenasa	20	8	12	1323	1426	28	Qualified for quarterfinals - Disbanded after the season
7	Gran Canaria 2014	20	8	12	1323	1426	28	
8	Tintos de Toro Caja Rural	20	7	13	1432	1488	27	
9	Hondarribia–Irún	20	6	14	1268	1404	26	Disbanded at the end of season
10	CB Bembibre PDM	20	5	15	1151	1358	25	
11	Toyota Recreativo Conquero	20	5	15	1307	1477	25	Spared from relegation to LF 2 due to vacance berths

== Playoffs ==
Quarterfinals
4	Cadí-ICG Software	72	81
5	Beroil Ciudad de Burgos	59	67
3	Spar UniGirona	64	73	66
6	UNB Obenasa	56	78	57

Semifinals
1	Rivas Ecópolis	81	88
4	Cadí-ICG Software	52	72
2	Perfumerías Avenida	60	76
3	Spar UniGirona	57	75

Finals
1	Rivas Ecópolis	53	66
2	Perfumerías Avenida	69	67

2012–13 Liga Femenina winners
(Castile and León)
Perfumerías Avenida
Third title

== Stats leaders in regular season ==
=== Points ===
Rk	Name	Team	Games	Points	PPG
1	(United States) Bernice Mosby	Toyota Recreativo Conquero	15	289	19.3
2	(United States) Rachel Allison	Beroil Ciudad de Burgos	20	383	19.1
3	(Senegal) Astou Traoré	Cadí-ICG Software	20	317	15.8
4	(Latvia) Aija Putniņa	UNB Obenasa	17	260	15.3
5	(Poland) Joanna Walich	Toyota Recreativo Conquero	18	268	14.9

=== Rebounds ===
Rk	Name	Team	Games	Rebounds	RPG
1	(Spain) Vanessa Blé	Gran Canaria 2014	20	226	11.3
2	(United States) Jacinta Monroe	Spar UniGirona	20	174	8.7
3	(Latvia) Aija Putniņa	UNB Obenasa	17	145	8.5
4	(Spain) Astou Ndour	Gran Canaria 2014	20	163	8.1
5	(United States) Jazz Covington	Cadí-ICG Software	18	140	7.8

=== Assists ===
Rk	Name	Team	Games	Assists	APG
1	(Spain) Noemí Jordana	Spar UniGirona	20	80	4.0
2	(Spain) Leticia Romero	Gran Canaria 2014	20	70	3.5
3	(Spain) María Asurmendi	UNB Obenasa	20	69	3.4
4	(Spain) Lidia Mirchandani	Toyota Recreativo Conquero	17	58	3.4
5	(Spain) Marta Fernández	Perfumerías Avenida	18	56	3.1

=== Performance Index Rating ===
Rk	Name	Team	Games	Rating	PIR
1	(Spain) Vanessa Blé	Gran Canaria 2014	20	428	21.4
2	(United States) Bernice Mosby	Toyota Recreativo Conquero	15	302	20.1
3	(United States) Rachel Allison	Beroil Ciudad de Burgos	20	374	18.7
4	(United States) Jacinta Monroe	Spar UniGirona	20	346	17.3
5	(Spain) Leticia Romero	Gran Canaria 2014	20	343	17.1
