= 2013 Copa de la Reina de Baloncesto =

Copa de la Reina 2013
- League: Copa de la Reina
- Sport: Basketball
- Duration: 9–10 March 2013
- Number of games: 3
- Number of teams: 4
- TV partner(s): Teledeporte, CyLTV

Final
- Champions: Rivas Ecópolis
- Runners-up: Perfumerías Avenida
- Finals MVP: (Jamaica) Aneika Henry

Copa de la Reina seasons
- ← 2012 2014 →

The Copa de la Reina de Baloncesto 2012–13 was the 51st edition of the Spanish Queen's Basketball Cup. It is managed by the Spanish Basketball Federation – FEB and was held in Zamora, in the Pabellón Ángel Nieto on March 9–10, 2013. Tintos de Toro Caja Rural was the host team. Rivas Ecópolis won its second Copa de la Reina title.

== Venue ==
Zamora
Pabellón Ángel Nieto
Capacity: 2,100
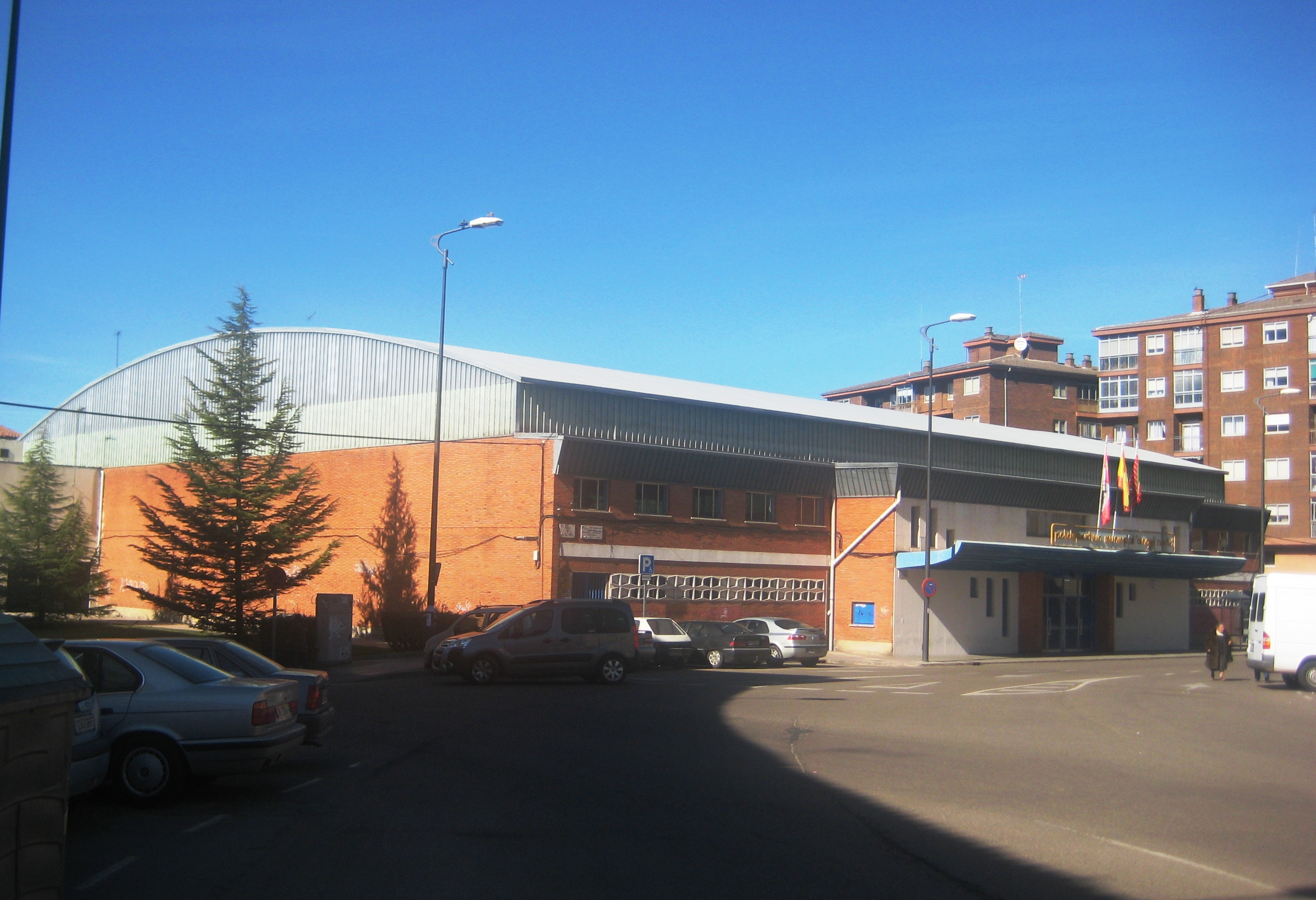

== Qualified teams ==
The top four qualified after the first half of the LFB Regular Season will qualify to the tournament.

#	Teams	P	W	L	PF	PA
1	Rivas Ecópolis	10	10	0	766	605
2	Perfumerías Avenida	10	8	2	748	670
3	SPAR UniGirona	10	7	3	721	612
4	Tintos de Toro Caja Rural	10	6	4	778	740

== Draw ==
The draw was held in Zamora on March 2, 2013.

== Bracket ==
Semifinals
1	Rivas Ecópolis	71
3	SPAR UniGirona	48
2	Perfumerías Avenida	83
4	Tintos de Toro Caja Rural	57

Final
1	Rivas Ecópolis	83
2	Perfumerías Avenida	62

=== Semi finals ===
Teledeporte

March 9
13:00 (UTC+1)

Report
Stats

Rivas Ecópolis	71–48	SPAR UniGirona
Scoring by quarter: 11–18, 22–12, 22–8, 16–10
Pts: Cruz 18; Rebs: Henry 7 Asts: Cruz 4 PIR: Cruz 28		Pts: Jordana 9 Rebs: Sarr 6 Asts: Feaster 3 PIR: Bou 9

Pabellón Ángel Nieto, Zamora
Attendance: 1,700
Referees: Alfonso Castillo, Mendoza Holgado

CyLTV
FEBtv

March 9
17:00 (UTC+1)

Report
Stats

Perfumerías Avenida	83–57	Tintos de Toro Caja Rural
Scoring by quarter: 21–12, 21–20, 20–13, 21–12
Pts: Xargay 19; Rebs: Pascua 10; Asts: Fernández 6 PIR: Xargay 25		Pts: Pounds 13; Rebs: Tuukkanen 10; Asts: three players 2 PIR: Pounds 14

Pabellón Ángel Nieto, Zamora
Attendance: 2,000
Referees: Zafra Guerra, Martínez Prada

=== Final ===
Teledeporte

March 10
11:00 (UTC+1)

Report
Stats

Rivas Ecópolis	83–62	Perfumerías Avenida
Scoring by quarter: 19–16, 22–25, 20–9, 22–12
Pts: Henry 17; Rebs: Henry 11; Asts: three players 3 PIR: Henry 29		Pts: Currie 20; Rebs: Pascua, Willingham 7 Asts: Xargay 4 PIR: Currie 15

Pabellón Ángel Nieto, Zamora
Attendance: 2,000
Referees: Morales Ruiz, Bravo Loroño

2013 Copa de la Reina winners
(Community of Madrid)
Rivas Ecópolis
Second title
