= 2013–14 Liga Femenina de Baloncesto =

2013–14 Liga Femenina season
- League: Liga Femenina
- Sport: Basketball
- Duration: October 2013–March 2014 (regular season); April 2014 (playoff)
- Games: 132 (regular season)
- Teams: 12
- TV partner(s): Teledeporte, FEBTv
- Finals champions: Rivas Ecópolis
- Runners-up: Perfumerías Avenida
- Finals MVP: Laura Nicholls

Liga Femenina seasons
- ← 2012–13 2014–15 →

The 2013–14 Liga Femenina de Baloncesto was the 51st edition of the Spanish premier women's basketball championship. Regular season started on 12 October 2013 and finished on 29 March. Playoffs began on 5 April with the semifinals, concluding in late April with Finals. Top four teams will play the championship playoffs during April. Twelve teams took part in the regular season.

Rivas Ecópolis won its first title after defeating Perfumerías Avenida 2–0 in the Final of the Championship playoff.

== Competition format ==
The first three qualified teams after the first half of the season and the host one will play the Copa de la Reina. If the host team finishes in the top three, the fourth qualified will join the competition.

After the Regular Season, the top four teams play the play-offs, featuring semi-finals and Finals.

== 2013–14 season teams ==
Liga Femenina 2013–14 teams
Canary Islands

Team	City	Arena	Year established	
Rivas Ecópolis	Rivas-Vaciamadrid	Cerro del Telégrafo	1993	
Perfumerías Avenida	Salamanca	Pabellón Wurzburg	1988	
Spar UniGirona	Girona	Girona-Fontajau	2005	
Cadí-ICG Software	La Seu d'Urgell	Palau d'Esports	1965	
Beroil–Ciudad de Burgos	Burgos	El Plantío	1996	
Gran Canaria 2014	Las Palmas	La Paterna	1980	
Alimentos de Zamora	Zamora	Ángel Nieto	1994	
Embutidos Pajariel Bembibre	Bembibre	Bembibre Arena	1995	
Conquero	Huelva	Andrés Estrada	1999	
Gipuzkoa UPV	San Sebastián	José Antonio Gasca	2005	Promoted from LF2
Bizkaia GDKO	Galdakao	Urreta	1983	Promoted from LF2
Mann Filter	Zaragoza	Eduardo Lastrada	1948	Promoted from LF2

== Regular season table ==
#	Team	P	W	L	PF	PA	PT	Qualification or relegation
1	Perfumerías Avenida	22	18	4	1655	1311	40	Qualified for play-offs
2	Rivas Ecópolis	22	17	5	1544	1275	39	Qualified for play-offs
3	Gran Canaria 2014	22	13	9	1560	1586	35	Qualified for play-offs
4	Embutidos Pajariel Bembibre	22	12	10	1387	1419	34	Qualified for play-offs
5	Spar UniGirona	22	11	11	1418	1440	33	
6	Beroil–Ciudad de Burgos	22	11	11	1267	1300	33	Disbanded
7	Cadí–ICG Software	22	10	12	1334	1360	32	
8	Gipuzkoa UPV	22	10	12	1367	1463	32	
9	Mann Filter	22	9	13	1408	1507	31	
10	Conquero	22	9	13	1310	1366	31	
11	Alimentos de Zamora	22	6	16	1386	1474	28	Spared from relegation to LF 2 due to vacance berths
12	Bizkaia GDKO	22	6	18	1261	1396	28	Relegated to LF 2

== Playoffs ==
All times are CEST, except for Canary Islands which is WEST.

Semifinals
1	Perfumerías Avenida	72	65	92
4	Embutidos Pajariel Bembibre	69	68	54
2	Rivas Ecópolis	74	62	72
3	Gran Canaria 2014	75	57	52

Final
1	Perfumerías Avenida	47	59
2	Rivas Ecópolis	61	62

=== Semifinals ===
==== (1) Perfumerías Avenida vs. (4) Embutidos Pajariel Bembibre ====
FEBTv

April 5
18:00

Box Score

Perfumerías Avenida 72, Embutidos Pajariel Bembibre 69
Scoring by quarter: 22–17, 19–23, 22–15, 9–14
Pts: Robinson 19; Rebs: Robinson 20; Asts: Xargay 10	Pts: Buch 18; Rebs: Montenegro 10; Asts: Buch 3

Pabellón de Wurzburg, Salamanca
Attendance: 2,800
Referees: Garmendia Zorita, Caballero Madrid

FEBTv

April 10
20:30

Box Score

Embutidos Pajariel Bembibre 68, Perfumerías Avenida 65
Scoring by quarter: 21–18, 19–20, 15–14, 13–13
Pts: A Gómez 21; Rebs: A Gómez, Montenegro 10; Asts: A Gómez, Buch 5	Pts: Murphy 22; Rebs: Robinson 13; Asts: Xargay 3

Bembibre Arena, Bembibre
Attendance: 1,600
Referees: de Lucas, Bravo Loroño

FEBTv

April 12
18:00

Box Score

Perfumerías Avenida 92, Embutidos Pajariel Bembibre 54
Scoring by quarter: 29–14, 21–23, 25–8, 17–9
Pts: Robinson 23; Rebs: Robinson 14; Asts: Rodríguez 6	Pts: Montenegro 17; Rebs: A Gómez 6 Asts: A Gómez 4
Perfumerías Avenida wins series, 2–1

Pabellón de Wurzburg, Salamanca
Attendance: 3,200
Referees: Morales Ruiz, Martínez Prada

==== (2) Rivas Ecópolis vs. (3) Gran Canaria 2014 ====
Teledeporte

April 5
16:00

Box Score

Rivas Ecópolis 74, Gran Canaria 2014 75
Scoring by quarter: 30–21, 15–19, 14–18, 15–17
Pts: Eldebrink 25; Rebs: Nicholls 14; Asts: three players 4	Pts: Ndour 18; Rebs: Ndour 11; Asts: Díaz 7

Cerro del Telégrafo, Rivas-Vaciamadrid
Attendance: 900
Referees: Carpallo Miguélez, Pinela García

Teledeporte

April 8
19:45

Box Score

Gran Canaria 2014 57, Rivas Ecópolis 62
Scoring by quarter: 10–14, 12–14, 18–14, 17–20
Pts: Díaz 18; Rebs: Ndour 14; Asts: Díaz 5	Pts: Eldebrink 14; Rebs: Eldebrink 9 Asts: Eldebrink 4

La Paterna, Las Palmas
Attendance: 1,000
Referees: Sánchez Ardid, García León

Teledeporte

April 12
12:00

Box Score

Rivas Ecópolis 72, Gran Canaria 2014 52
Scoring by quarter: 15–10, 27–13, 17–6, 13–23
Pts: Allison 15; Rebs: Nicholls 8 Asts: Eldebrink 5	Pts: three players 12; Rebs: Ndour 12; Asts: Díaz 3
Rivas Ecópolis wins series, 2–1

Cerro del Telégrafo, Rivas-Vaciamadrid
Attendance: 1,000
Referees: Terreros San Miguel, Muñoz García

=== Final ===
==== (1) Perfumerías Avenida vs. (2) Rivas Ecópolis ====
Teledeporte

April 21
20:30

Box Score

Perfumerías Avenida 47, Rivas Ecópolis 61
Scoring by quarter: 15–14, 15–20, 6–15, 11–12
Pts: Robinson 19; Rebs: Robinson 15; Asts: Xargay 6	Pts: Allison 18; Rebs: Nicholls 10; Asts: Eldebrink 4

Pabellón de Wurzburg, Salamanca
Attendance: 3,000
Referees: Pagán Baró, Gómez López

Teledeporte

April 26
21:00

Box Score

Rivas Ecópolis 62, Perfumerías Avenida 59
Scoring by quarter: 21–20, 17–12, 12–14, 12–13
Pts: Nicholls 16; Rebs: Nicholls 10; Asts: Bermejo 5	Pts: Robinson 18; Rebs: Murphy 10; Asts: Murphy 3
Rivas Ecópolis wins Championship playoffs, 2–0

Cerro del Telégrafo, Rivas-Vaciamadrid
Referees: Morales Ruiz, Mas Cagide

2013–14 Liga Femenina winners
(Community of Madrid)
Rivas Ecópolis
First title

== Stats leaders in regular season ==
=== Points ===
Rk	Name	Team	Games	Points	PPG
1	(United States) Charde Houston	Spar UniGirona	11	216	19,64
2	(United States) Brittany Chambers	Gran Canaria 2014	22	22	19,59
3	(Spain) Arantxa Novo	Gipuzkoa UPV	22	394	17,91
4	(Spain) Astou Ndour	Gran Canaria 2014	22	392	17,82
5	(United States) Shay Murphy	Perfumerías Avenida	21	373	17,76

=== Rebounds ===
Rk	Name	Team	Games	Rebounds	RPG
1	(Spain) Astou Ndour	Gran Canaria 2014	22	291	13,23
2	(Spain) Vanessa Blé	Spar UniGirona	11	126	11,45
3	(Spain) Ylenia Manzanares	Alimentos de Zamora	22	222	10,09
4	(Nigeria) Ify Ibekwe	Bizkaia GDKO	11	100	9,09
5	(Argentina) Gisela Vega	Mann Filter	22	197	8,95

=== Assists ===
Rk	Name	Team	Games	Assists	APG
1	(Spain) Arantxa Novo	Gipuzkoa UPV	22	139	6,32
2	(United States) Brittany Chambers	Gran Canaria 2014	22	77	3,5
3	(Spain) Marta Xargay	Perfumerías Avenida	22	73	3,32
4	(Spain) Ana Suárez	Alimentos de Zamora	18	57	3,17
5	(Spain) Anna Gómez	Embutidos Pajariel Bembibre	22	67	3,05

=== Performance Index Rating ===
Rk	Name	Team	Games	Rating	PIR
1	(Spain) Astou Ndour	Gran Canaria 2014	22	549	24,95
2	(Spain) Vanessa Blé	Spar UniGirona	11	236	21,45
3	(Spain) Arantxa Novo	Gipuzkoa UPV	22	460	20,91
4	(United States) Charde Houston	Spar UniGirona	11	221	20,09
5	(United States) Shay Murphy	Perfumerías Avenida	21	377	17,95
