= María Asurmendi =

Spanish basketball player

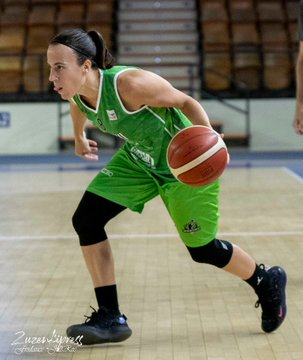
- Asurmendi playing for Araski AES

No. 8 – Araski
- Position: Point guard
- League: Liga Femenina

Personal information
- Born: 4 April 1986 (age 40) Pamplona, Spain
- Listed height: 5 ft 6 in (1.68 m)

Career information
- Playing career: 2004–present

Career history
- 2004–2005: Universidad Pública de Navarra
- 2005–2006: Irlandesas
- 2006–2007: Ciudad de Burgos
- 2007–2009: Cortegada
- 2009–2013: Unión Navarra Basket
- 2013–2014: Sedis
- 2014–2016: Conquero
- 2016–2017: Gernika
- 2018–2019: Avenida
- 2019–: Araski

María del Carmen Asurmendi Villaverde (born 4 April 1986) is a Spanish basketball player who plays as a point guard for Araski AES.

== Career ==
Asurmendi was born in Pamplona. She made her debut in the Liga Femenina in the 2006–07 season with Arranz Jopisa Burgos and has played in several clubs of the Spanish top division.

== International career ==
She has played with the U-21 Spanish national team in the World Championship of such category which was played in Moscow in 2007.

== Awards and accomplishments ==
- Spanish Cup: (1)
  - 2016 with CB Conquero
- Spanish League: (1)
  - 2015–16 with CB Avenida
