= Lidia Mirchandani =

Spanish basketball player

Þór Akureyri
- Title: Head coach
- League: 1. deild kvenna

Personal information
- Born: 26 July 1976 (age 50) Santa Cruz de Tenerife
- Listed height: 170 cm (5 ft 7 in)

Career information
- Playing career: 1994–2018
- Position: Guard

Career history

Playing
- 1994–1995: CB Isla De Tenerife
- 1995–1996: Deportivo Ensino
- 1996–1999: CB Islas Canarias
- 1999–2001: CE Universitari Basquet
- 2001–2003: Ros Casares Valencia
- 2003–2004: CB Puig d'en Valls
- 2004–2005: Taranto Cras Basket
- 2005–2006: Spartak Moscow Region
- 2006: CB Isla De Tenerife
- 2006–2007: Napoli Vomero
- 2007–2008: CB Vinaros
- 2008: CB Ciudad de Burgos
- 2008–2009: Real Canoe
- 2009: CB Islas Canarias
- 2009–2010: CB Uni Chapatal
- 2010–2011: CB Pio XII
- 2011–2013: CB Conquero
- 2013: CD Boston College
- 2014: CD Univ Austral
- 2017–2018: Skallagrímur

Coaching
- 2017–2018: Skallagrímur (assistant)
- 2025–present: Þór Akureyri (w)
- 2025–present: Þór Akureyri (m) (assistant)

Career highlights
- As player: Spanish champion (2002); 3x Copa de la Reina (1999, 2002, 2003); Ronchetti Cup (1999); Liga Femenina 2 champion (2012)
Medals
Women's basketball
Representing Spain
EuroBasket Women
| Bronze medal – third place | 2001 France | National team |

Lidia Mirchandani (born 26 July 1976) is a Spanish basketball player and coach. On the international level, she represented the Spanish national team.

== Club career ==
After four seasons of retirement, Mirchandani returned to the court on 1 November 2017, at the age of 41, with Skallagrímur in the Icelandic Úrvalsdeild kvenna.

== Spain national team ==
Mirchandani played 34 games for the Spain national team and helped it win bronze at the 2001 EuroBasket.

== Personal life ==
Mirchandani is of Indian descent. She is married to Ricardo González Dávila, the former head coach of North Korea's men's and women's national basketball teams and the Chilean women's national basketball team.
