= Ricardo González Dávila =

Spanish basketball coach (born 1972)

Personal information
- Born: 26 May 1972 (age 54) Madrid, Spain

Career history

Playing
- 1990–1991: Fuenlabrada

Coaching
- 2010–2012: CB Ciudad de Burgos
- 2013–2015: Chile (women's)
- 2016: La Salle-Olympic
- 2016: North Korea (men's)
- 2016: North Korea (women's)
- 2017: Tromsø Storm
- 2017–2018: Skallagrímur
- 2021–202?: Tunisia (women's)
- 2025–2026: Þór Akureyri (m)
- 2025–present: Þór Akureyri (w) (assistant)
Medals
Head Coach for Chile
women's national basketball team
South American Games
Silver medal – second place	2014 Santiago	Team

Ricardo González Dávila (born 26 May 1972) is a Spanish basketball coach who is currently the head coach of Þór Akureyri in the Úrvalsdeild kvenna. He coached North Korea's men's and women's national basketball teams from September to December 2016. He coached the Chilean women's national basketball team from 2013 to 2015.

== Coaching career ==
In 2016, Dávila was hired as the head coach of La Salle-Olympic.

On 3 June 2017 Dávila was hired as the head coach of Skallagrímur of the Úrvalsdeild kvenna. On 14 January Skallagrímur fired Dávila as its head coach. Skallagrímur had lost in the Icelandic Basketball Cup semi-finals two days before and a rift between Dávila and star player Carmen Tyson-Thomas became public after the game.

On 27 January Dávila was hired as a coach to Keflavík's junior basketball teams.

In May 2025, Dávila was hired as the head coach of Þór Akureyri men's team and an assistant to the women's team. He stepped down as head coach of the men's team in March 2026.

== Personal life ==
Dávila is married to Lidia Mirchandani, a former professional basketball player and former member of the Spanish women's national basketball team.
