= Aneika Henry =

American-Azerbaijani basketball player (born 1986)

Aneika Henry-Morello
OGM Orman Genclik Ankara
- Position: Power forward / center
- League: Turkish Women's Basketball League

Personal information
- Born: February 13, 1986 (age 40) Jamaica
- Listed height: 6 ft 4 in (1.93 m)
- Listed weight: 192 lb (87 kg)

Career information
- High school: Coral Gables (Coral Gables, Florida)
- College: Seminole CC (2005–2007); Florida (2007–2009)
- WNBA draft: 2009: undrafted
- Playing career: 2009–present

Career history
- 2009–2010: CB Gran Canaria
- 2010–2011: Mann Filter Zaragoza
- 2011–2012: Lotos VBW Clima Gdynia
- 2012–2015: Atlanta Dream
- 2012–2013: Rivas Ecopolis
- 2013–2014: Hatay Büyükşehir Belediyesi
- 2014–2015: Guangdong Dolphins
- 2015–2016: Mersin S.K.
- 2016: Connecticut Sun
- 2016–2017: Osmaniye Genclik
- 2017: Atlanta Dream
- 2017–2018: Heilongjiang Shenda
- 2018–present: OGM Orman Genclik Ankara

Career highlights
- Queen's Cup winner (2013)
- Stats at WNBA.com
- Stats at Basketball Reference

Aneika A. Henry (born February 13, 1986) is a professional basketball player for OGM Orman Genclik Ankara of the Turkish Women's Basketball League. Born in Jamaica and raised in the United States, she represents Azerbaijan internationally.

== Early life ==
Henry was born in Jamaica. She was 11 years old when she and her family moved to the United States and lived in Florida.

== High school ==
Henry was a 2004 graduate of Coral Gables Senior High School, where she played basketball. Upon graduation, she became enrolled at Seminole.

== College career ==
In the first two years of her college career, Henry attended Seminole State College of Florida and played for the school's team in the National Junior College Athletic Association. In 2007, Henry then attended the University of Florida after graduation from Seminole, playing for the school's team in the more mainstream exposed National Collegiate Athletic Association. During her two years with Florida, she had 8 double-figure scoring games, had 2 double-figure rebounding games and participated in the 2008 Slam Sunk Contest.

== College statistics ==
Legend
GP	Games played	GS	Games started	MPG	Minutes per game
FG%	Field goal percentage	3P%	3-point field goal percentage	FT%	Free throw percentage
RPG	Rebounds per game	APG	Assists per game	SPG	Steals per game
BPG	Blocks per game	PPG	Points per game	**Bold**	Career high

Year	Team	GP	Points	FG%	3P%	FT%	RPG	APG	SPG	BPG	PPG
2007-08	Florida	**33**	**152**	53.1	-	41.0	**5.6**	0.4	**0.5**	**1.9**	**4.6**
2008-09	Florida	32	117	**54.5**	-	**61.8**	3.3	**0.5**	0.4	1.5	3.7
Career	Florida	65	269	53.7	-	50.7	4.5	0.4	0.5	1.7	4.1

== Professional career ==
=== WNBA ===
Henry entered the 2009 WNBA draft but went undrafted. She played the next 3 years overseas before playing on a WNBA team. In 2011, Henry had signed with the Seattle Storm to a training camp contract, but was waived before the season started. In 2012, Henry signed with the Atlanta Dream to a training camp contract. Following the training camp she made the final roster for the team, becoming the third Jamaican player in WNBA history. In her rookie season with the Dream, Henry played 34 games with 14 starts as a reserve, averaging 4.8 ppg and 4.1 rpg. During the season, Henry set a franchise record for most field goals made without a miss in a regular season game win against the Tulsa Shock, where she scored 14 points on 7 of 7 field goal shooting. In 2013, Henry re-signed with the Dream. During the 2013 season, Henry played 34 games with 1 start averaging 3.9 ppg and 3.9 rpg. The Dream made it all the way to the 2013 WNBA Finals but were swept by the Minnesota Lynx. In 2015, Henry re-signed once again to the Dream. In the 2015 season, Henry played 29 games with 11 starts and averaged a career-high in scoring but the Dream never made it to the playoffs. In 2016, Henry signed a 2-year contract with the Connecticut Sun. After playing 10 games in her first season with the Sun, Henry would miss the rest of the season while being listed as day-to-day, due to undisclosed health reasons. On January 26, 2017, Henry was traded back to the Dream in exchange for Reshanda Gray.

=== Overseas ===
Prior to her WNBA career, Henry played in Spain and Poland for CB Gran Canaria, Mann Filter Zaragoza and Lotos VBW Clima Gdynia from 2009 to 2012. In the 2012–13 off-season, Henry played in Spain for Rivas Ecopolis. In the 2013-14 off-season, played in Turkey for Hatay Büyükşehir Belediyesi. In the 2014-15 off-season, Henry played for Guangdong Dolphins in China. In the 2015-16 off-season, Henry played in Turkey once again for Mersin S.K. As of June 2016, Henry signed with Osmaniye Genclik of the Turkish League for the 2016-17 off-season. In 2017, Henry signed with Heilongjiang Shenda of the Chinese league for the 2017-18 off-season. In August 2018, Henry signed with OGM Orman Genclik Ankara of the Turkish League for 2018-19.

== National team career ==
In 2015, Henry along with teammate Tiffany Hayes received Azerbaijani citizenship and competed for the Azerbaijan women's national basketball team at the 2015 European Games held in Baku, Azerbaijan.

== WNBA statistics ==
Legend
GP	Games played	GS	Games started	MPG	Minutes per game	RPG	Rebounds per game
APG	Assists per game	SPG	Steals per game	BPG	Blocks per game	PPG	Points per game
TO	Turnovers per game	FG%	Field-goal percentage	3P%	3-point field-goal percentage	FT%	Free-throw percentage
**Bold**	Career best	°	League leader

=== Regular season ===
Year	Team	GP	GS	MPG	FG%	3P%	FT%	RPG	APG	SPG	BPG	TO	PPG
2012	Atlanta	**34**	**14**	**18.0**	.468	.000	.762	4.1	0.4	**0.4**	**0.8**	0.8	4.8
2013	Atlanta	**34**	1	12.8	.450	.000	**.765**	3.9	**0.5**	0.2	0.5	0.7	3.9
2014	Atlanta	**34**	4	12.8	.582	.000	.676	3.4	0.3	0.2	0.6	0.9	4.5
2015	Atlanta	29	11	17.9	.485	.000	.750	**4.7**	0.4	0.3	**0.8**	1.5	**5.2**
2016	Connecticut	10	2	5.0	.385	.000	.400	1.4	0.2	0.1	0.1	0.6	1.2
2017	Atlanta	6	0	5.1	**.857**	.000	.000	1.0	0.3	0.3	0.0	**0.5**	2.0
Career	6 years, 2 teams	147	32	14.2	.495	.000	.727	3.8	0.4	0.3	0.6	1.0	4.2

=== Playoffs ===
Year	Team	GP	GS	MPG	FG%	3P%	FT%	RPG	APG	SPG	BPG	TO	PPG
2012	Atlanta	3	0	10.0	**.750**	.000	**1.000**	1.7	0.0	0.0	0.6	1.0	2.7
2013	Atlanta	**8**	**3**	**22.7**	.550	.000	.833	**6.6**	**0.3**	**0.6**	**0.8**	**0.8**	6.1
2014	Atlanta	3	0	16.2	.727	.000	.750	2.3	**0.3**	**0.6**	0.0	1.3	**6.3**
Career	3 years, 1 team	14	3	18.6	.600	.000	.833	4.6	0.2	0.5	0.6	1.0	5.4

== See also ==
- List of Florida Gators in the WNBA
- List of University of Florida alumni
