= CD Zamarat =

Spanish basketball club

Quesos El Pastor La Polvorosa
- Leagues: Liga Femenina
- Founded: 1994
- Arena: Ángel Nieto
- Location: Zamora
- Team colors: Orange
- President: Carlos Baz
- Head coach: Juan Ángel de Mena
- Website: cdzamarat.es
Home	Away

Club Deportivo Zamarat, (known as Quesos El Pastor La Polvorosa for sponsorship reasons) is a Spanish women's basketball club from Zamora founded in 1994. Attaining promotion to the LFB in 2011, it ranked 10th with a 9–17 balance in its debut season.

== Notable players ==
Criteria

To appear in this section a player must have either:

- Played at least three seasons for the club.
- Set a club record or won an individual award while at the club.
- Played at least one official international match for their national team at any time.
- Played at least one official WNBA match at any time.

- (Lithuania) Lina Pikčiūtė

== Season by season ==
Season	Tier	Division	Pos.	Copa de la Reina
2000–01	3	2ª División	1st	
2001–02	3	1ª División	6th	
2002–03	3	1ª División	9th	
2003–04	3	1ª División	9th	
2004–05	3	1ª División	1st	
2005–06	2	Liga Femenina 2	5th	
2006–07	2	Liga Femenina 2	4th	
2007–08	2	Liga Femenina 2	2nd	
2008–09	2	Liga Femenina 2	3rd	
2009–10	2	Liga Femenina 2	6th	
2010–11	2	Liga Femenina 2	1st	
2011–12	1	Liga Femenina	10th	
2012–13	1	Liga Femenina	8th	Semifinalist
2013–14	1	Liga Femenina	11th	
2014–15	1	Liga Femenina	8th	
2015–16	1	Liga Femenina	9th	
2016–17	1	Liga Femenina	12th	
2017–18	1	Liga Femenina	12th	
2018–19	1	Liga Femenina	12th	
