= 2012 Copa de la Reina de Baloncesto =

Copa de la Reina 2012
- League: Copa de la Reina
- Sport: Basketball
- Duration: 10–11 March 2012
- Games: 3
- Teams: 4
- TV partner(s): Teledeporte, Canal 9, TV3 and CYLTV

Final
- Champions: Perfumerías Avenida
- Runners-up: Ros Casares
- Finals MVP: (Brazil) Érika de Souza

Copa de la Reina seasons
- ← 2011 2013 →

The 2012 Copa de la Reina de Baloncesto (Queen's Cup of Basketball) was the 50th edition of the Spanish women's basketball national cup. It was contested by the top four teams in the 2011–12 Liga Femenina de Baloncesto after Week 24 and took place on 10–11 March 2012 in Arganda del Rey, Madrid. The three matches were broadcast by Teledeporte and autonomical channels Canal 9, TV3 and CYLTV.

2011 Euroleague and Spanish League champion CB Avenida won its third cup by beating 68–57 favorite Ros Casares. Defending champion BC Rivas was defeated by Ros Casares in the semifinals, while Uni Girona made its debut in the competition.

== Results ==
Semi-finals
10 March
Prefumerías Avenida	71
Girona FC	67
10 March
Ros Casares Valencia	61
Rivas Ecópolis	51

Final
11 March
Perfumerías Avenida	68
Ros Casares Valencia	57

=== Semifinals ===
March 10
16:00 (UTC+1)

Report (in Spanish)

Perfumerías Avenida (Castile and León)	71–67	(Catalonia) Girona FC
Scoring by quarter: 24-25, 20-5, 18-16, 9-21
Pts: de Souza 19; Rebs: de Souza 12; Asts: Xargay 5		Pts: Thorburn 13; Rebs: Robinson 11; Asts: Thorburn 7

Pabellón Príncipe Felipe,
Arganda del Rey

March 10
16:00 (UTC+1)

Report (in Spanish)

Ros Casares Valencia (Valencian Community)	61–51	(Community of Madrid) Rivas Ecópolis
Scoring by quarter: 12-12, 20-8, 18-20, 11-11
Pts: Murphy 17; Rebs: Lyttle 12; Asts: Palau 7		Pts: Nicholls 13; Rebs: Cruz, Jones 11; Asts: Cruz 4

Pabellón Príncipe Felipe,
Arganda del Rey

=== Final ===
March 11
11:00 (UTC+1)

Report (in Spanish)

Perfumerías Avenida (Castile and León)	68–57	(Valencian Community) Ros Casares Valencia
Scoring by quarter: 11-15, 16-8, 23-16, 18-18
Pts: de Souza 17; Rebs: de Souza 13; Asts: Fernández 3		Pts: Moore 24; Rebs: Wauters 13; Asts: Palau, Wauters 4

Pabellón Príncipe Felipe,
Arganda del Rey

2012 Copa de la Reina winners
(Castile and León)
Perfumerías Avenida
Third title
