= Brittany Chambers =

American basketball player

Personal information
- Born: April 3, 1991 (age 35) Crosby, Minnesota, U.S.
- Listed height: 5 ft 8 in (1.73 m)

Career information
- High school: Jordan (Jordan, Minnesota)
- College: Kansas State (2009–2013)
- WNBA draft: 2013: 2nd round, 22nd overall pick
- Drafted by: Los Angeles Sparks
- Playing career: 2013–present
- Position: Guard

Career history
- 2013–2014: Gran Canaria
- 2014–present: Uni Girona

Career highlights
- 3× First-team All-Big 12 (2011–2013)
- Stats at Basketball Reference

Brittany Chambers (born April 3, 1991) is an American basketball player who plays professionally in Spain. She was drafted by the Los Angeles Sparks in the 2013 WNBA draft. On March 2, 2015, Chambers signed with the San Antonio Stars, but was released before the start of the 2015 WNBA season.

== College statistics ==
Season	Games	FGM	FGA	PCT	FTM	FTA	PCT	3PM	3PA	PCT	REB	AST	STL	BL	PTS	AVG
2009-10	32	129	312	.413	65	77	.844	65	171	.380	185	80	22	2	388	12.1
2010-11	32	187	436	.429	52	85	.612	88	236	.373	185	84	38	2	514	16.1
2011-12	34	162	457	.354	72	85	.758	80	257	.311	211	77	38	4	476	14.0
2012-13	37	273	640	.427	115	149	.772	117	310	.337	281	122	46	3	778	21.0
Totals	135	751	1845	.407	304	406	.749	350	974	.359	862	363	144	11	2156	16.0

== Personal life ==
Chambers majored in pre-medicine at Kansas State University.

Attended A.T. Still University, Kirksville College of Osteopathic Medicine.
