= Haley Peters =

American basketball player (born 1992)

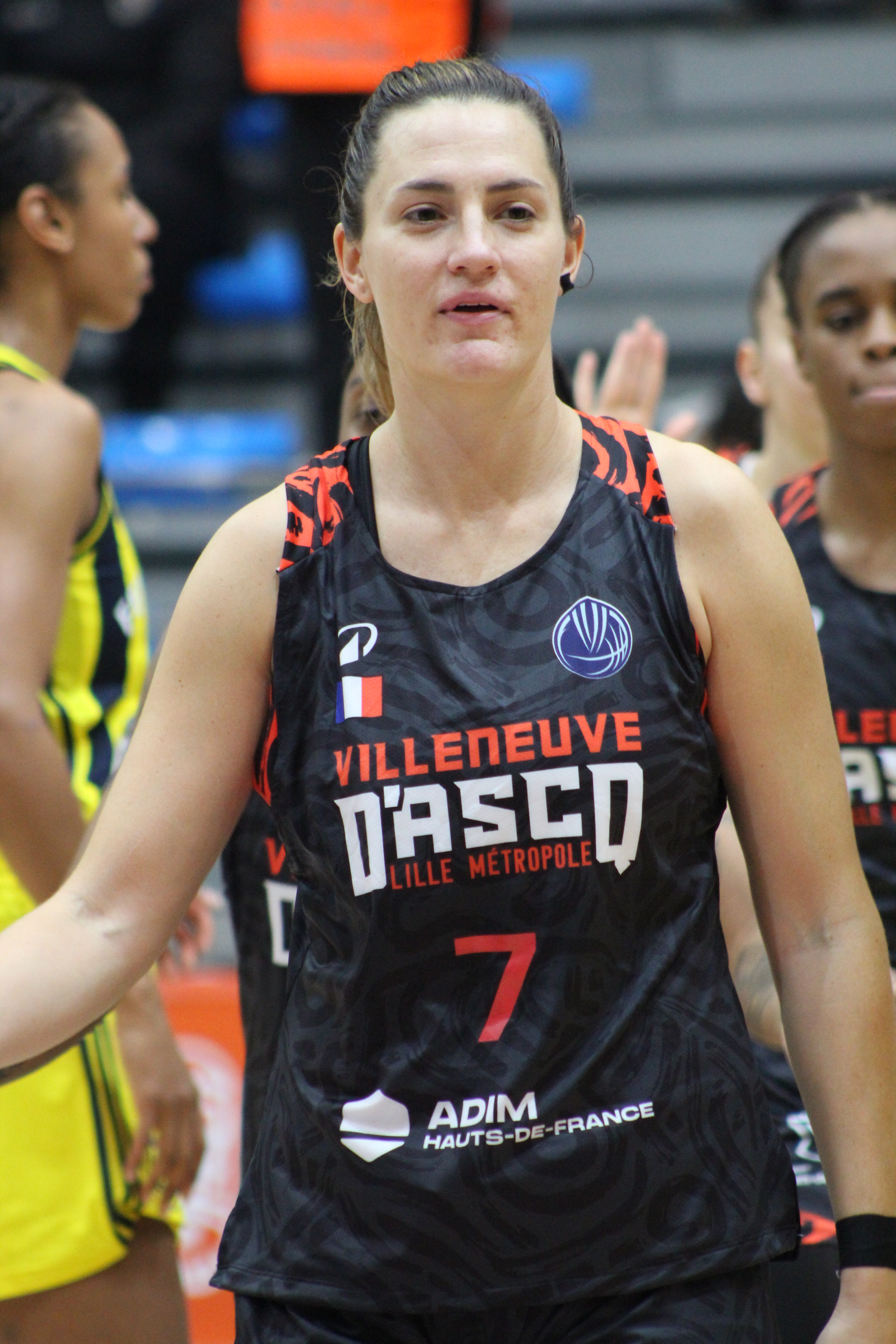
- Peters with Villeneuve-d'Ascq in 2024

No. 33 – Perth Lynx
- Position: Forward
- League: WNBL

Personal information
- Born: September 17, 1992 (age 34) Summit, New Jersey, U.S.
- Listed height: 6 ft 3 in (1.91 m)
- Listed weight: 178 lb (81 kg)

Career information
- High school: Peddie School (Hightstown, New Jersey)
- College: Duke (2010–2014)
- WNBA draft: 2014: undrafted
- Playing career: 2014–present

Career history
- 2014–2015: Baxi Ferrol
- 2015–2016: Conquero Huelva Wagen
- 2016–2017: San Antonio Stars
- 2016–2017: Spar Girona
- 2017: Washington Mystics
- 2017–2018: Lyon
- 2018–2019: Flammes Carolo Basket Ardennes
- 2019: Atlanta Dream
- 2019–2020: Hatay Bsb
- 2020–2021: Villeneuve-d'Ascq
- 2021–2023: Lattes Montpellier
- 2023: Adelitas de Chihuahua
- 2023–2024: Virtus Bologna
- 2024–2025: Villeneuve-d'Ascq
- 2025: Connecticut Sun
- 2025–2026: Southside Melbourne Flyers
- 2026: Dandenong Rangers
- 2026–present: Perth Lynx

Career highlights
- EuroCup winner (2025); LNBPF champion (2023); French Supercup winner (2022); Spanish Cup winner (2016); Second-team All-ACC (2013); Third-team All-ACC (2012); McDonald's All-American (2010)
- Stats at WNBA.com
- Stats at Basketball Reference

Haley McCloskey Peters (born September 17, 1992) is an American professional basketball player for the Perth Lynx of the Women's National Basketball League (WNBL). She played college basketball for the Duke Blue Devils.

== Early life ==
Peters was born in Summit, New Jersey. She attended Peddie School in Hightstown, New Jersey, where she was a McDonald's All-American and New Jersey Gatorade Player of the Year in 2010.

== College career ==
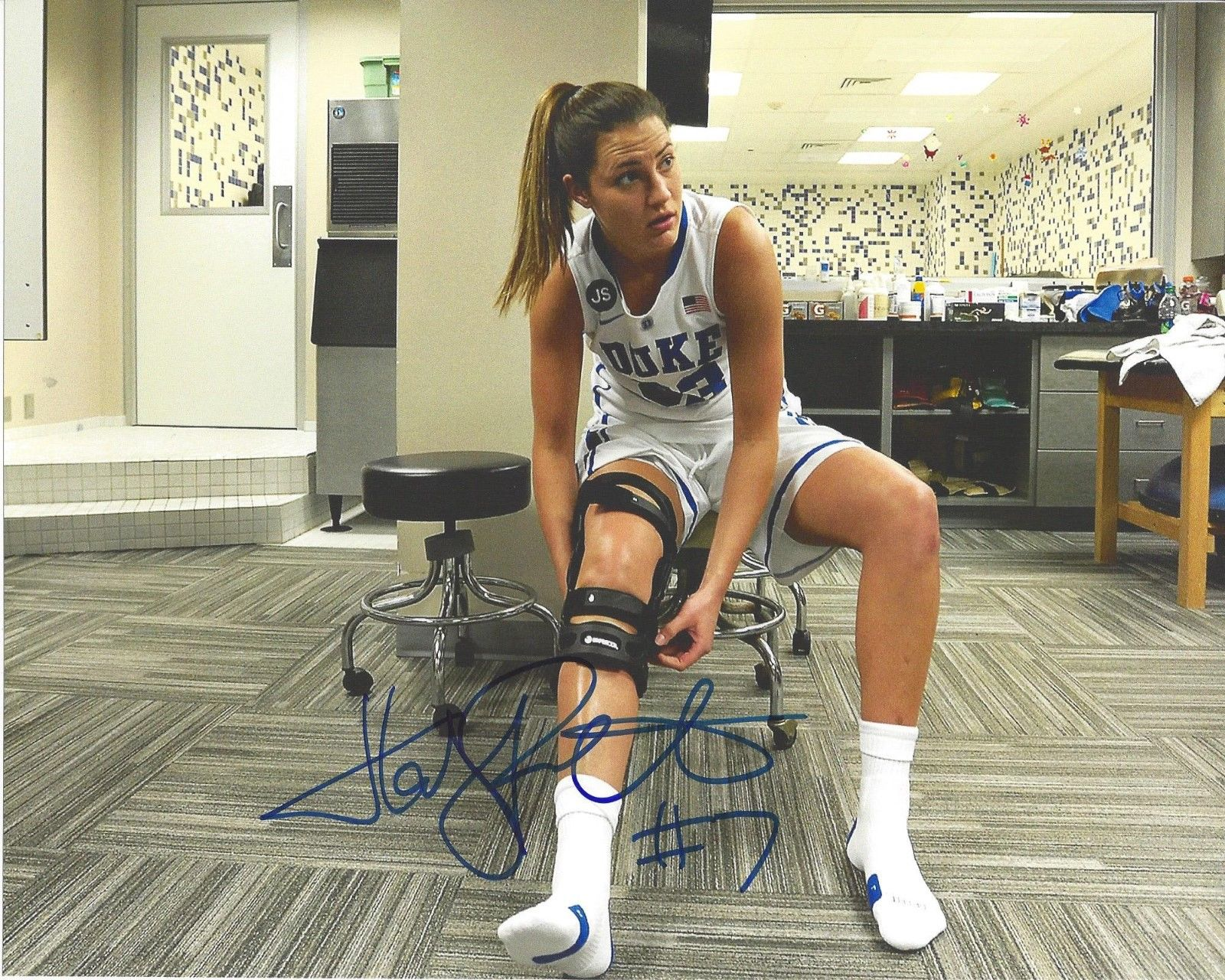
Peters with Duke, c. 2013/2014

As a freshman at Duke in 2010–11, Peters saw the court in all 36 games, while making nine starts. As a sophomore in 2010–11, she was All-ACC Third Team after averaging 10.8 points, 5.6 rebounds, 1.3 assists and 1.3 steals in 33 games (all starts). As a junior in 2011–12, she was named All-ACC Second Team and All-ACC Tournament First Team, having started all 36 contests and averaging 12.2 points, 7.6 rebounds, 1.9 assists and 1.1 steals.

As a senior in 2013–14, Peters was named All-ACC Tournament Second Team. She started all 31 games she played, missing four games with a knee injury. She averaged 11.2 points, a tied for team-best 7.6 rebounds, 1.7 assists and 1.3 steals. She helped guide Duke to two ACC Tournament Championships, three ACC regular season titles and three trips to the NCAA Elite Eight over her four years.

== Professional career ==
=== WNBA ===
After going undrafted in the 2014 WNBA draft, Peters had a training camp stint with the Washington Mystics. She played for the San Antonio Stars during the 2016 and 2017 seasons. At the end of the 2017 season, she signed a seven-day contract with the Mystics. She played for the Atlanta Dream during the 2019 season.

Peters joined the Connecticut Sun for the 2025 WNBA season. She appeared in 33 games, including two starts, averaging 2.1 points, 2.2 rebounds, 0.8 assists, and 0.3 steals per game.

=== Overseas ===
Peters played three seasons in Spain between 2014 and 2017 for Baxi Ferrol (2014–15), Conquero Huelva Wagen (2015–16) and Spar Girona (2016–17). She played two seasons in France between 2017 and 2019 for Lyon (2017–18) and Flammes Carolo Basket Ardennes (2018–19) before playing in Turkey for Hatay Bsb in 2019–20. She returned to France where she played between 2020 and 2023 for Villeneuve-d'Ascq (2020–21) and Lattes Montpellier (2021–23). After a season in Mexico for Adelitas de Chihuahua of the LNBPF, she played for Italian team Virtus Bologna in 2023–24. She had a second stint with French team Villeneuve-d'Ascq in 2024–25.

In October 2025, Peters signed with the Southside Melbourne Flyers of the Women's National Basketball League (WNBL) for the 2025–26 season.

In May 2026, Peters joined the Dandenong Rangers of the NBL1 South. She played four games for the Rangers during the 2026 NBL1 season.

In August 2026, Peters signed with the Perth Lynx for the 2026–27 WNBL season.

== Career statistics ==
Legend
GP	Games played	GS	Games started	MPG	Minutes per game	RPG	Rebounds per game
APG	Assists per game	SPG	Steals per game	BPG	Blocks per game	PPG	Points per game
TO	Turnovers per game	FG%	Field-goal percentage	3P%	3-point field-goal percentage	FT%	Free-throw percentage
**Bold**	Career best	°	League leader

=== WNBA ===
==== Regular season ====
Stats current through end of 2025 season

WNBA regular season statistics
Year	Team	GP	GS	MPG	FG%	3P%	FT%	RPG	APG	SPG	BPG	TO	PPG
2016	San Antonio	**34**	0	**17.5**	.349	.250	.757	**2.3**	**0.8**	**0.4**	0.2	0.8	**5.8**
2017	San Antonio	2	0	**17.5**	**.375**	**.600**	—	1.0	0.5	0.0	0.0	1.5	4.5
2017	Washington	2	0	4.0	.000	.000	—	0.5	0.0	0.0	0.0	**0.5**	0.0
2018	Did not appear in league												
2019	Atlanta	4	0	6.5	.000	—	**1.000**	0.5	0.3	0.3	**0.3**	1.0	0.5
2020	Did not appear in league												
2021	Did not appear in league												
2022	Did not appear in league												
2023	Did not appear in league												
2024	Did not appear in league												
2025	Connecticut	33	**2**	11.5	.305	.205	.769	2.2	0.8	0.3	0.1	0.7	2.1
**Career**	4 years, 4 teams	75	2	13.9	.329	.248	.769	2.1	0.7	0.3	0.1	0.8	3.7

=== College ===
NCAA statistics
Year	Team	GP	GS	MPG	FG%	3P%	FT%	RPG	APG	SPG	BPG	TO	PPG
2010–11	Duke	**36**	9	17.6	**.522**	.286	.735	3.6	0.7	0.4	0.2	**1.8**	6.3
2011–12	Duke	33	33	27.3	.512	.439	.744	5.6	1.3	**1.3**	0.3	2.5	10.8
2012–13	Duke	**36**	**36**	30.1	.507	**.474**	**.768**	**7.6**	**1.9**	1.1	**0.5**	2.7	**12.2**
2013–14	Duke	31	30	**31.2**	.466	.321	.683	**7.6**	1.7	**1.3**	0.2	2.6	11.2
**Career**		136	108	26.4	.500	.394	.729	6.1	1.4	1.0	0.3	2.4	10.1

== Personal life ==
Peters is the daughter of Kurt Peters and Sharon McCloskey. She has two brothers, Casey and Ryan. Casey was a member of the Duke men's basketball team and graduated in 2011.
