= Astou Ndour-Fall =

Spanish basketball player (born 1994)

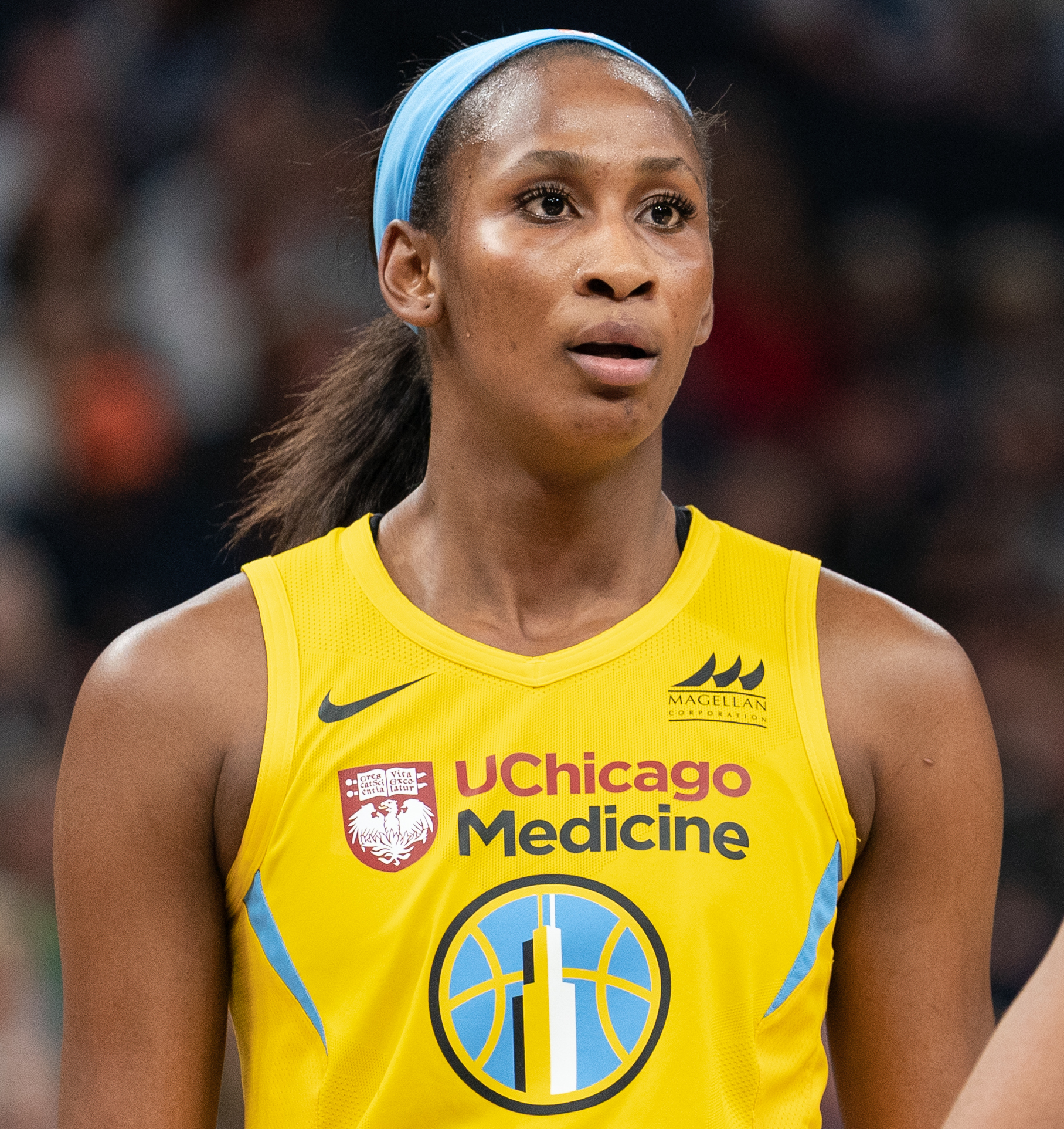
- Ndour-Fall playing in 2019

No. 45 – Emlak Konut
- Position: Center / power forward
- League: Turkish Women's Basketball League

Personal information
- Born: August 22, 1994 (age 32) Dakar, Senegal
- Listed height: 6 ft 5 in (1.96 m)
- Listed weight: 173 lb (78 kg)

Career information
- WNBA draft: 2014: 2nd round, 16th overall pick
- Drafted by: San Antonio Stars
- Playing career: 2011–present

Career history
- 2011–2014: Gran Canaria
- 2014: San Antonio Stars
- 2014–2015: Fenerbahçe
- 2015–2016: Perfumerías Avenida
- 2016: San Antonio Stars
- 2016–2018: Passalacqua Ragusa
- 2018–2019: Chicago Sky
- 2018–2019: Çukurova Basketbol
- 2019–2020: Dynamo Kursk
- 2020: Dallas Wings
- 2020–2021: Hatayspor
- 2021: Chicago Sky
- 2021–2022: Reyer Venezia
- 2022–2023: Famila Schio
- 2023–2024: Gran Canaria
- 2024: Connecticut Sun
- 2024–2025: Emlak Konut

Career highlights
- WNBA champion (2021); FIBA Europe Young Women's Player of the Year Award (2013); Turkish Presidents Cup winner (2014); Turkish Cup winner (2015); Spanish National League champion (2016); Lega Basket Femminile champion (2023)
- Stats at WNBA.com
- Stats at Basketball Reference

Astou Ndour-Fall (née Ndour; born August 22, 1994) is a Spanish professional basketball player for Emlak Konut of the Turkish Women's Basketball League. Born in Senegal, she represents Spain internationally. She previously played for the Chicago Sky, Connecticut Sun, Dallas Wings, and San Antonio Stars of the Women's National Basketball Association (WNBA).

== Early life ==
Astou Ndour was born in Dakar, Senegal on August 8, 1994. Both of her parents had been basketball players. She was a stand-out basketball player at her school in Dakar. Ndour-Fall moved to Las Palmas, Canary Islands where she was adopted by the ex-coach Domingo Díaz and his wife, when she was 14. She continued to play basketball for her school's team in Las Palmas.

== Career ==
=== Europe ===
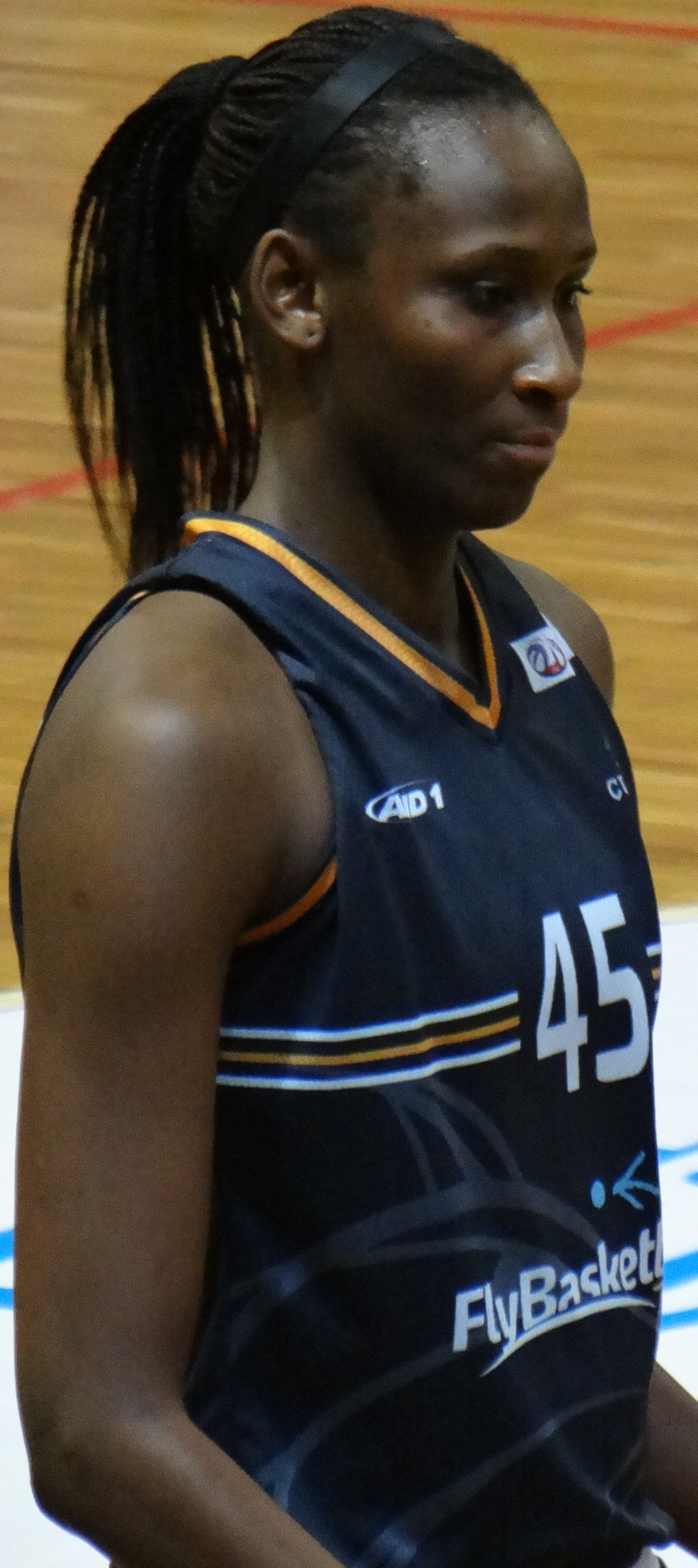
Ndour-Fall (#45) playing for Çukurova

Ndour-Fall joined the youth system of Gran Canaria in 2009. She also played in the Junior Spanish Championship that year. Ndour-Fall became a naturalized Spanish citizen in 2011. She was a part of the Spanish youth team that won the silver medal at the 2011 FIBA Under-19 World Championship for Women where she nearly averaged a double-double. As a member of the Spanish Youth National Team, Ndour-Fall's teams always won a medal in each tournament she played, including the bronze medal at the Under-18 European Championship for Women.

Ndour-Fall started to play with the Spain women's national basketball team on 2014 when she was 20 years old, although she couldn't play the 2014 FIBA World Championship for Women, since Spain opted to take Sancho Lyttle, and FIBA Regulations establish that only one naturalized player per roster can participate in national teams competitions.

In 2015, she was part of the Spanish roster that won the bronze medal at the EuroBasket Women 2015 in Hungary and Romania. Ndour-Fall was acquired from the San Antonio Stars by the Chicago Sky in exchange for Clarissa Dos Santos in February 2017. In May 2017, Ndour-Fall was suspended by the Sky due to injury.

In 2018 she signed for Turkish team Çukurova Basketbol and in 2019 for Russian team Dynamo Kursk.

=== WNBA ===
Ndour-Fall played for the San Antonio Stars in the 2014 and 2016 WNBA seasons. She was traded to the Chicago Sky in 2017, and played for that team in the 2018 and 2019 seasons. In 2019, she averaged 17.5 minutes and 6.8 points per game in the regular season and 25.5 minutes and 16.5 points in the playoffs as a starter. Ending the season as a restricted free agent, she was re-signed and traded to the Dallas Wings before the 2020 season. She was waived by the Wings after the season, and signed a one-year contract to return to the Sky.

== Career statistics ==
Legend
GP	Games played	GS	Games started	MPG	Minutes per game	RPG	Rebounds per game
APG	Assists per game	SPG	Steals per game	BPG	Blocks per game	PPG	Points per game
TO	Turnovers per game	FG%	Field-goal percentage	3P%	3-point field-goal percentage	FT%	Free-throw percentage
**Bold**	Career best	°	League leader

	Denotes seasons in which Ndour–Fall won a Lega Basket Femminile championship
	Denotes seasons in which Ndour–Fall won a Spanish National League championship
†	Denotes seasons in which Ndour–Fall won a WNBA championship

=== International ===
International statistics
Season	Team	GP	MPG	FG%	3PT%	FT%	RPG	APG	SPG	BPG	TO	PPG
2010–11	(Spain) CB Islas Canarias	9	5.7	.533	—	.571	1.7	0.0	0.2	0.3	**0.4**	2.2
2011–12	(Spain) CB Islas Canarias	23	24.3	.547	.345	.750	7.0	0.2	0.6	0.5	1.7	9.7
2012–13	(Spain) CB Islas Canarias	18	32.8	.524	.316	.714	7.6	0.3	0.7	0.7	1.9	14.5
2013–14	(Spain) CB Islas Canarias	25	17.3	.520	.382	.672	**13.1**	0.6	1.2	**1.6**	3.0	17.3
2014–15	(Turkey) Fenerbahçe	16	14.2	.543	.200	.739	4.7	0.7	0.5	0.5	1.1	8.6
2015–16	(Spain) Perfumerías Avenida	31	22.5	.551	.289	.694	6.8	0.5	1.0	1.0	1.6	10.0
2016–17	(Italy) Virtus Eirene Ragusa	25	30.8	.541	.400	.697	8.2	0.4	1.2	1.1	2.2	14.3
2017–18	(Italy) Virtus Eirene Ragusa	**34**	29.3	.596	.347	.784	6.9	0.7	0.9	1.0	0.7	14.9
2018–19	(Turkey) Çukurova Basketbol	31	26.2	.600	.333	.753	6.3	0.9	0.8	1.0	2.2	15.2
2019–20	(Russia) Dynamo Kursk	7	17.0	.373	.333	**.846**	6.0	0.1	0.7	0.6	0.6	7.9
2020–21	(Turkey) Hatayspor	23	28.2	**.645**	.333	.775	8.3	0.8	0.7	0.8	1.6	16.0
2021–22	(Italy) Reyer Venezia	18	25.9	.561	**.477**	.706	8.1	0.8	**1.7**	0.9	1.8	15.1
2022–23	(Italy) Beretta Famila Schio	25	23.8	.606	.219	.745	7.8	0.5	0.5	0.4	1.0	12.4
2023–24	(Spain) CB Islas Canarias	13	**37.6**	.597	.309	.746	9.3	**1.7**	0.7	0.8	1.5	**18.7**

==== EuroCup and EuroLeague ====
EuroCup and EuroLeague statistics
Season	Team	GP	MPG	FG%	3PT%	FT%	RPG	APG	SPG	BPG	TO	PPG
2010–11 EuroCup	(Spain) CB Islas Canarias	5	5.0	**.750**	—	.750	2.2	0.0	0.0	0.2	0.8	1.8
2011–12 EuroCup	(Spain) CB Islas Canarias	10	**34.4**	.477	.333	.725	**10.9**	0.2	**1.7**	1.7	2.7	**16.1**
2014–15 EuroLeague	(Turkey) Fenerbahçe	14	18.4	.484	.444	.611	5.7	0.2	0.5	0.8	1.3	9.6
2015–16 EuroLeague	(Spain) Perfumerías Avenida	14	28.7	.581	.242	.857	8.1	0.5	0.5	0.9	1.6	11.3
2016–17 EuroCup	(Italy) Virtus Eirene Ragusa	10	29.6	.490	.300	.703	8.0	0.6	1.3	1.3	1.1	14.7
2017–18 EuroCup	(Italy) Virtus Eirene Ragusa	8	25.2	.493	**.542**	.692	6.1	0.6	1.0	0.4	**0.7**	14.6
2018–19 EuroCup	(Turkey) Çukurova Basketbol	12	24.6	.577	.464	.853	5.9	1.1	0.9	1.3	1.9	15.7
2018–19 EuroLeague	(Turkey) Çukurova Basketbol	2	25.5	.571	.400	.714	3.0	0.0	0.5	**2.5**	2.0	13.5
2019–20 EuroLeague	(Russia) Dynamo Kursk	4	23.3	.524	.429	**1.000**	3.8	1.0	0.5	0.3	1.8	8.5
2020-21 EuroCup	(Turkey) Hatayspor	3	28.3	.556	.167	.444	8.7	**1.7**	0.7	1.3	2.3	15.7
2021–22 EuroCup	(Italy) Reyer Venezia	4	32.0	.448	.133	.850	7.5	1.0	1.0	1.3	1.8	12.3
2021–22 EuroLeague	(Italy) Reyer Venezia	10	26.6	.532	.324	.650	5.7	1.3	1.3	1.0	1.5	13.3
2022–23 EuroLeague	(Italy) Beretta Famila Schio	**19**	26.9	.586	.333	.750	5.9	0.9	0.6	0.9	1.5	11.5

=== WNBA ===
==== Regular season ====
Stats current through end of 2024 season

WNBA regular season statistics
Year	Team	GP	GS	MPG	FG%	3P%	FT%	RPG	APG	SPG	BPG	TO	PPG
2014	San Antonio	8	0	4.4	.421	.333	—	1.1	0.0	0.0	0.3	0.4	2.1
2015	—	Did not play											
2016	San Antonio	**30**	9	14.9	.396	.344	.829	3.2	0.4	0.4	**0.9**	0.5	6.0
2017	—	Did not play (injury)											
2018	Chicago	22	9	11.6	.474	.318	.769	2.5	0.3	0.2	0.5	0.5	4.6
2019	Chicago	21	**11**	**17.5**	**.492**	**.424**	.722	4.2	**0.7**	**0.5**	0.7	0.7	**6.8**
2020	Dallas	13	7	11.6	.351	.240	—	2.9	0.5	0.2	0.5	0.5	3.5
2021^{†}	Chicago	20	8	17.1	.397	.235	**.941**	**4.8**	0.4	0.4	0.8	0.9	6.6
2022	—	Did not play (personal)											
2023	—	Did not play (suspended)											
2024	Connecticut	22	0	4.2	.346	.200	.833	0.8	0.0	0.0	0.2	**0.1**	1.1
**Career**	7 years, 4 teams	136	44	12.4	.420	.314	.832	2.9	0.4	0.3	0.6	0.5	4.7

==== Playoffs ====
WNBA playoff statistics
Year	Team	GP	GS	MPG	FG%	3P%	FT%	RPG	APG	SPG	BPG	TO	PPG
2014	San Antonio	1	0	0.0	—	—	—	0.0	0.0	0.0	0.0	**0.0**	0.0
2019	Chicago	2	**2**	**25.5**	**.667**	**.500**	**.667**	**8.5**	**1.0**	**1.5**	**1.0**	1.5	**16.5**
2021^{†}	Chicago	**9**	0	7.7	.421	.200	**.667**	1.6	0.0	0.2	0.7	0.1	2.3
2024	Connecticut	3	0	1.0	—	—	—	0.0	0.3	0.0	0.0	**0.0**	0.0
**Career**	4 years, 3 teams	15	2	8.2	.550	.364	.667	2.1	0.2	0.3	0.5	0.3	3.6

== National team ==
Ndour-Fall started playing with Spain's youth teams at 16, winning a total of four medals from 2011 to 2014. She made her debut with the senior team in 2014, when she was 20 years old. Up to 2021, she had 75 caps, with 13.1 PPP and 7.2 RPP:

- 2011 FIBA Under-19 World Championship (youth)
- 2011 FIBA Europe Under-18 Championship (youth)
- 2013 FIBA Europe Under-20 Championship (youth)
- 4th 2013 FIBA Under-19 World Championship (youth)
- 2014 FIBA Europe Under-20 Championship (youth)
- 2015 Eurobasket
- 2016 Summer Olympics
- 2018 World Championship (All-Tournament Team)
- 2019 Eurobasket (All-Tournament Team, MVP)
- 7th 2021 Eurobasket
- 6th 2020 Summer Olympics

== Personal life ==
Ndour-Fall married Pape Fall in 2021.
