= Adaora Elonu =

Nigerian-American basketball player (born 1990)

CB Avenida
- Position: Forward
- League: Liga Femenina

Personal information
- Born: 28 April 1990 (age 36) Houston, Texas, U.S.
- Listed height: 6 ft 1 in (1.85 m)
- Listed weight: 165 lb (75 kg)

Career information
- High school: Alief Elsik (Houston, Texas)
- College: Texas A&M (2008–2012)
- WNBA draft: 2012: undrafted
- Playing career: 2012–present

Career history
- 2012–2013: Hapoel Galil Elyon
- 2013–2014: Beroil–Ciudad de Burgos
- 2014–2016: CB Conquero
- 2016–2018: CB Avenida
- 2018: Atlanta Dream
- 2019–2021: Uni Girona CB
- 2021–2022: Nadezhda Orenburg
- 2022–present: CB Avenida

Career highlights
- 2× Liga Femenina champion (2017, 2018); 5× Copa de la Reina (2017–2019, 2020, 2022); 4× Supercopa de España (2017–2020); NCAA champion (2011); Spanish Cup Most Valuable player (2016); AfroBasket MVP (2021 Women's Afrobasket)
- Stats at Basketball Reference
Medals
Women's basketball
Representing Nigeria
African Games
Silver medal – second place	2015 Brazzaville	Team
AfroBasket
Bronze medal – third place	2015 Cameroon
Gold medal – first place	2017 Mali
Gold medal – first place	2019 Senegal
Gold medal – first place	2021 Cameroon

Adaora Nnenna Elonu (born 28 April 1990) is a Nigerian-American professional basketball player and a member of the Nigeria women's national team. Elonu played college basketball for Texas A&M, with whom she won the 2011 NCAA Championship.

== Texas A&M statistics ==
Legend
GP	Games played	GS	Games started	MPG	Minutes per game
FG%	Field goal percentage	3P%	3-point field goal percentage	FT%	Free throw percentage
RPG	Rebounds per game	APG	Assists per game	SPG	Steals per game
BPG	Blocks per game	PPG	Points per game	**Bold**	Career high

Year	Team	GP	Points	FG%	3P%	FT%	RPG	APG	SPG	BPG	PPG
2008–09	Texas A&M	34	166	**48.7%**	0.0%	46.7%	3.3	0.4	1.1	0.4	4.9
2009–10	Texas A&M	34	302	47.1%	**36.4%**	73.7%	5.1	0.9	1.2	0.6	8.9
2010–11	Texas A&M	**38**	320	41.9%	20.0%	**76.3%**	5.9	1.3	1.3	0.4	8.4
2011–12	Texas A&M	35	**407**	47.3%	25.0%	71.2%	**6.2**	**1.5**	**1.7**	**1.1**	**11.6**
Career		141	1195	45.9%	25.0%	71.0%	5.2	1.0	1.3	0.6	8.5

== Club career ==
In 2012, she went overseas, playing one season in Israel for Hapoel Galil Elyon, after which she signed in Spain with Beroil–Ciudad de Burgos. After the team disbanded, she signed for CB Conquero with whom she won the 2016 Copa de la Reina, being selected as the tournament's MVP. Despite not playing several games with the club due to lack of payment of her wages, she likewise finished the regular season with the highest efficiency ranking. Subsequently, she signed for Spanish champion CB Avenida for season 2016–17. She averaged 9.9ppg, 4.3rpg, 1.8apg and 1.5spg. She helped them to win the Supercup and end the regular season at the top position

On 10 August 2018, she signed with the WNBA side Atlanta Dream on a seven-day contract.

Elonu moved to Spanish side Uni Girona CB in August, 2019. she won Most Valuable Player (MVP) as Uni Girona, defeated Perfumerías Avenida 82–80 points to lift the Spanish Super Cup at the Fontajau in September, 2019.

She started the 2021–2022 season with Nadezhda Orenburg of the Russian PBL league but left the club following the 2022 Russian invasion of Ukraine. Shortly later she returned to Spain and signed with CB Avenida.

== WNBA career statistics ==
Legend
GP	Games played	GS	Games started	MPG	Minutes per game	RPG	Rebounds per game
APG	Assists per game	SPG	Steals per game	BPG	Blocks per game	PPG	Points per game
TO	Turnovers per game	FG%	Field-goal percentage	3P%	3-point field-goal percentage	FT%	Free-throw percentage
**Bold**	Career best	°	League leader

=== Regular season ===
Year	Team	GP	GS	MPG	FG%	3P%	FT%	RPG	APG	SPG	BPG	TO	PPG
2018	Atlanta	1	0	1.0	.000	.000	.000	0.0	0.0	0.0	0.0	0.0	0.0
Career	1 year, 1 team	1	0	1.0	.000	.000	.000	0.0	0.0	0.0	0.0	0.0	0.0

== International career ==
Elonu has played with the Nigerian's national team with whom she achieved the bronze medal in the AfroBasket Women 2015, being elected as part of the tournament's All-Star Five. She was part of the Nigerian side that won gold at the Afrobasket 2017 championship in Mali. She averaged the team's high 3.9 assists per game. She was also a member of the tournament's top ten players. Elonu emerged captain of the Nigeria Women's National Basketball Team on 10 August while the team camped in Atlanta in preparation for the 2018 FIBA Women's World Cup. During the 2018 FIBA Women's Basketball World Cup, she averaged 7.4 points, 4.6 rebounds and 2.1 assists per game. She also participated in the 2021 FIBA women's Afrobasket basketball tournament in Cameroon, as the captain of the team, clinching the title. She was named the tournament's Most Valuable Player (MVP).

== Personal life ==
Adaora Elonu is also the sister of professional basketball player Chinemelu Elonu.

== Awards and accomplishments ==
=== Club ===
- 2011: 2011 NCAA Championship
- 2016: Spanish Cup (being named Tournament MVP)
- 2019: Spanish Cup (being named Tournament MVP)

=== National team ===
- 2015: Bronze Medal at AfroBasket Women 2015 (named in the tournament's All-Star Five)
- 2017: Gold Medal at AfroBasket Women 2017
- 2019: Gold Medal at AfroBasket Women 2019
- 2021: Gold Medal at AfroBasket Women 2021 (named the tournament's Most Valuable Player)
