= Vanessa Blé =

Spanish basketball player

Personal information
- Born: 12 August 1991 (age 35) Abidjan, Ivory Coast
- Listed height: 1.90 m (6 ft 3 in)

Career information
- Playing career: 2009–present
- Position: Center

Career history
- 2009–2010: Ibiza Sport Island
- 2010–2011: Cadí ICG
- 2011–2013: Gran Canaria
- 2013–2014: Galatasaray S.K.
- 2014–present: CB Avenida

Doukole Vanessa Blé (born 12 August 1991) is an Ivorian-born Spanish women's professional basketball player who plays for the Spanish club CB Avenida in the Women's EuroLeague. Born in Ivory Coast, she represented Spain internationally.
