= 2016 Copa de la Reina de Baloncesto =

Copa de la Reina 2016
- League: Copa de la Reina
- Sport: Basketball
- Duration: 6–7 February 2016
- Number of games: 3
- Number of teams: 4
- Season MVP: Adaora Elonu
- Top scorer: Adaora Elonu
- Finals champions: CB Conquero
- Runners-up: Perfumerías Avenida

Copa de la Reina seasons
- ← 2015 2017 →

The Copa de la Reina de Baloncesto 2016 is the 54th edition of the Spanish Queen's Basketball Cup. It is managed by the Spanish Basketball Federation – FEB and was held in San Sebastián, in the Polideportivo Municipal José Antonio Gasca on February 6–7, 2016.

== Bidding process ==
The rules of the Spanish Basketball Federation establish that the three first teams classified at the end of the first leg, together with the club representing the host province will play the Competition. If the host finishes between the three first teams, the fourth classified will also participate.

The cities of Salamanca, Huelva, Logroño, and San Sebastián had bid for hosting the 2016 edition of the Cup. Finally, on December 17 2015, the Spanish Basketball Federation awarded the organization of the Cup to the city of San Sebastián, qualifying IDK Gipuzkoa as the host team. This designation, done less than 48 hours prior to the last game of the first leg, and which left one spot for sporting merits less in the tournament, received criticism from some clubs involved in the qualification.

Pos	Team	Pld	W	L	PF	PA	PD	Pts	Qualification
1	Perfumerías Avenida	13	12	1	953	741	+212	25	Seeded teams
2	Conquero Huelva Wagen	13	10	3	932	833	+99	23	Seeded teams
3	Spar Citylift Girona	13	9	4	860	777	+83	22	Non-seeded teams
9	IDK Gipuzkoa (H)	13	5	8	802	821	−19	18	Non-seeded teams

Source: Liga Femenina
(H) Hosts

== Draw ==
The draw was held in San Sebastián on January 15, 2016. Perfumerías Avenida and Conquero Huelva Wagen were the seeded teams and couldn't be faced each other in the semi-finals. Perfumerías Avenida was matched with Spar Citylift Girona, and Conquero Huelva Wagen with IDK Gipuzkoa.

== Bracket ==
Semifinals
1	Perfumerías Avenida	68
3	Spar City-Lift Girona	60
2	Conquero Huelva Wagen	59
4	IDK Gipuzkoa	31

Final
1	Perfumerías Avenida	52
2	Conquero Huelva Wagen	60
