= Vanessa Gidden =

Jamaican basketball player

No. 43 – Club Deportivo Promete
- Position: Center
- League: La Liga Feminina

Personal information
- Born: 1 July 1985 (age 41) Kingston, Jamaica
- Listed height: 1.91 m (6 ft 3 in)

Career information
- High school: Stamford High School
- College: Hofstra University

Career history
- 2010-2011: Napoli Basket Vomero
- 2011-2012: Basket Alcamo
- 2012-2013: Hapoel Petah Tikva
- 2013-2014: Elitzur Ramla
- 2014-2015: Uni Girona CB
- 2015-2017: CB Avenida
- 2017-?: TS Wisła Can-Pack Kraków

Vanessa Gidden (born 1 July 1985) is a Jamaican professional basketball player for Quesos El Pastor of La Liga Feminina.
