= Stadium Casablanca =

Spanish multi-sports club

- Full name: Agrupación Deportiva Stadium Casablanca
- Founded: February 1947; 79 years ago
- President: Jesús Molins Guitarte
- Website: stadiumcasablanca.com
Home colours

Stadium Casablanca (officially Agrupación Deportiva Stadium Casablanca) is a multi-sports club based in Zaragoza, in the autonomous community of Aragon. The club currently has 16 sporting sections, notably including football, basketball and tennis.

== History ==
Founded in February 1947, Stadium Casablanca officially began activities in May 1948. Despite having a women's football senior team, the men's section only focused on youth categories.

Stadium's women's basketball section played in the Liga Femenina de Baloncesto until 2020, when the structure of the club was integrare into the Basket Zaragoza team; they were also known as Mann-Filter for sponsorship reasons.

== Season by season ==
=== Basketball ===
Season	Tier.	Division	Pos.	Copa de la Reina
2001–02	2	Liga Femenina 2	5th	
2002–03	2	Liga Femenina 2	6th	
2003–04	2	Liga Femenina 2	8th	
2004–05	2	Liga Femenina 2	7th	
2005–06	2	Liga Femenina 2	11th	
2006–07	2	Liga Femenina 2	11th	
2007–08	2	Liga Femenina 2	9th	
2008–09	2	Liga Femenina 2	7th	
2009–10	2	Liga Femenina 2	6th	
2010–11	2	Liga Femenina 2	6th	
2011–12	2	Liga Femenina 2	4th	
2012–13	2	Liga Femenina 2	2nd (Note: Promoted to Liga Femenina by achieving a vacant place.)	
2013–14	1	Liga Femenina	9th	
2014–15	1	Liga Femenina	12th	
2015–16	1	Liga Femenina	4th	
2016–17	1	Liga Femenina	11th	
2017–18	1	Liga Femenina	3rd	Semifinalist
2018–19	1	Liga Femenina	8th	
