= CB Islas Canarias =

SPAR Gran Canaria
- Leagues: Liga Femenina
- Founded: 1980
- Arena: Pabellón La Paterna
- Location: Las Palmas, Spain
- Team colors: Yellow
- President: Domingo Díaz
- Head coach: Pepe Carrión
- Championships: 1 Ronchetti Cup; 2 Copas de la Reina
- Website: cbislascanarias.com
| Home | Away |

Club de Baloncesto Islas Canarias, better known for sponsorship reasons as SPAR Gran Canaria, is a Spanish women's basketball team from Las Palmas de Gran Canaria. Founded in 1980, it has played in the Spanish Women's League since 1983.

1998-99 was Islas Canarias' most successful season to date with the club winning the Ronchetti Cup, the national Cup and being the national championship's runner-up. The following year the team won its second cup and again reached the Ronchetti Cup's final, and in 2003 it played its third European final, in the new EuroCup.

The team declined in subsequent seasons, with two 6th spots as its best domestic results. Nonetheless, it has remained a regular in the EuroCup.

== Season by season ==
| Season | Tier | Division | Pos. | Copa de la Reina | European competitions | |
|---|---|---|---|---|---|---|
| 1996–97 | 1 | Liga Femenina | 4th | | 2 Ronchetti Cup | R32 |
| 1997–98 | 1 | Liga Femenina | 4th | Runner-up | 2 Ronchetti Cup | R16 |
| 1998–99 | 1 | Liga Femenina | 4th | Champion | 2 Ronchetti Cup | C |
| 1999–00 | 1 | Liga Femenina | 2nd | Champion | 2 Ronchetti Cup | RU |
| 2000–01 | 1 | Liga Femenina | 5th | | 2 Ronchetti Cup | QF |
| 2001–02 | 1 | Liga Femenina | 5th | | 2 Ronchetti Cup | GS |
| 2002–03 | 1 | Liga Femenina | 4th | | 2 EuroCup | RU |
| 2003–04 | 1 | Liga Femenina | 9th | | 2 EuroCup | GS |
| 2004–05 | 1 | Liga Femenina | 6th | Quarterfinalist | 2 EuroCup | CPO |
| 2005–06 | 1 | Liga Femenina | 7th | Quarterfinalist | 2 EuroCup | R32 |
| 2006–07 | 1 | Liga Femenina | 8th | Quarterfinalist | 2 EuroCup | R32 |
| 2007–08 | 1 | Liga Femenina | 10th | | 2 EuroCup | R32 |
| 2008–09 | 1 | Liga Femenina | 11th | | 2 EuroCup | GS |
| 2009–10 | 1 | Liga Femenina | 8th | | 2 EuroCup | R16 |
| 2010–11 | 1 | Liga Femenina | 9th | | 2 EuroCup | QF |
| 2011–12 | 1 | Liga Femenina | 6th | | 2 EuroCup | QF |
| 2012–13 | 1 | Liga Femenina | 7th | | | |
| 2013–14 | 1 | Liga Femenina | 3rd | Semifinalist | | |
| 2014–15 | 1 | Liga Femenina | 10th | | | |
| 2015–16 | 1 | Liga Femenina | 13th (Note: Remained in the league after CB Conquero was not admitted.) | | | |
| 2016–17 | 1 | Liga Femenina | 14th | | | |
| 2017–18 | 2 | Liga Femenina 2 | 2nd | | | |

== Notable former players ==
- (Spain) Astou Ndour
- (Spain) Rosi Sánchez
- (Finland) Tiina Sten
- (Montenegro) Iva Perovanović

== Trophies ==
- Spanish Cups: (2)
  - 1999, 2000
- Ronchetti Cup: (1)
  - 1998–99
