= CB Conquero =

Basketball team in Andalusia, Spain

Conquero Huelva Wagen
- Founded: 1999
- Arena: Polideportivo Municipal Andrés Estrada
- Capacity: 2,800
- Location: Huelva
- Main sponsor: Huelva Wagen
- President: Rosa Espada
- Head coach: Gabriel Carrasco
- Championships: 1 Copa de la Reina
- Website: cbconquero.es
Home	Away

'Club Baloncesto Conquero', is a Spanish women's basketball club based in Huelva, that currently plays in the Liga Femenina de Baloncesto.

== History ==
Created in 1999 from the merger of local clubs CB Gilest and CB Ciudad de Huelva, the team reached the second category in 2008 and was promoted to the Spanish top division in 2012.

In February 2016, Conquero won its first national title after defeating Perfumerías Avenida by 70–62 in the final of the Copa de la Reina.

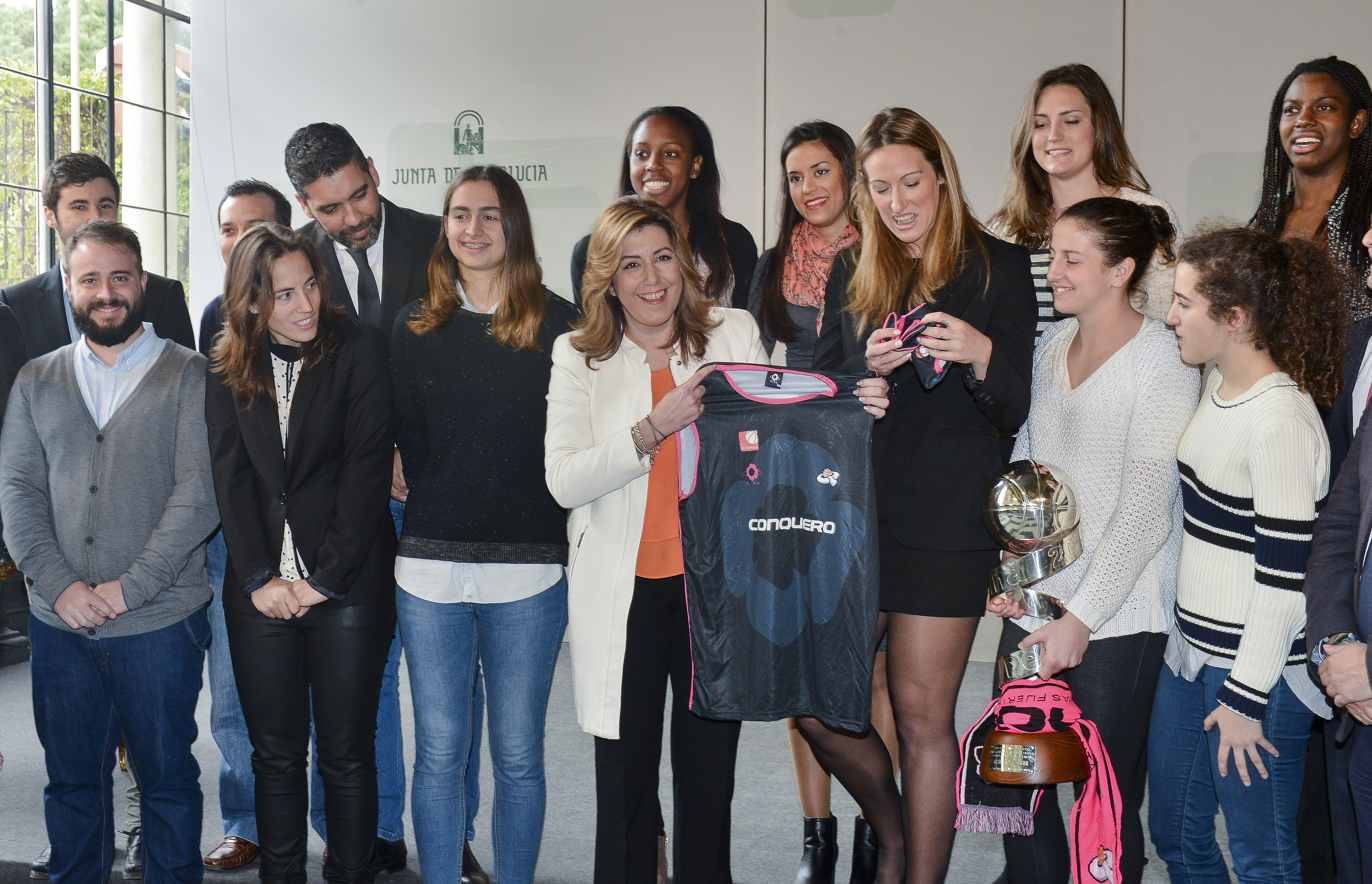

In July 2016, after finishing in third position for the season, the club was expelled from the Liga Femenina due to its debts. Following this decision, the club chose to register in the third tier while awaiting a judicial verdict regarding its expulsion.

== Season by season ==
Season	Tier	Division	Pos.	Copa de la Reina
2005–06	3	1ª División	4th	
2006–07	3	1ª División	7th	
2007–08	3	1ª División	3rd	
2008–09	2	Liga Femenina 2	15th	
2009–10	2	Liga Femenina 2	14th	
2010–11	2	Liga Femenina 2	7th	
2011–12	2	Liga Femenina 2	2nd	
2012–13	1	Liga Femenina	11th (Note: Remained in the category due to the existence of vacant berths.)	
2013–14	1	Liga Femenina	10th	
2014–15	1	Liga Femenina	3rd	Runner-up
2015–16	1	Liga Femenina	3rd (Note: Expelled from the competition due to debts with the Spanish Basketball Federation.)	Champion
2016–17	3	1ª División	7th	
2017–18	3	1ª División		

== Notable former players ==
- (Bulgaria) Radostina Dimitrova
- (Netherlands) Tanya Bröring
- (Poland) Joanna Walich
- (Spain) Lidia Mirchandani
- (Spain) Rosó Buch
- (United States) Bernice Mosby
- (United States) Kaitlin Sowinski
