= Baloncesto Rivas =

Spanish women's basketball club

Rivas Ecópolis
- Founded: 1993
- Arena: Cerro del Telégrafo
- Location: Rivas-Vaciamadrid, Spain
- Team colors: Red
- President: José Luis Pérez
- Head coach: Miguel Méndez
- Championships: 1 Liga Femenina; 2 Copa de la Reina
- Website: basketrivas.com
Home	Away

Baloncesto Rivas CDE, commonly known as Rivas Ecópolis due to sponsorship reasons, is a Spanish professional women's basketball team based in Rivas-Vaciamadrid, Community of Madrid.

== History ==
Baloncesto Rivas was founded in 1988 as CD Covíbar but the women's basketball team didn't play until 1993.

Rivas first played in the top category in 2004, but it couldn't avoid relegation. However the team was back for the 2007 season and rose into the championship's top places, attaining 3rd (2009, 2010) and 4th (2011) spots. These results earned Rivas qualification for the Euroleague, where it reached the Round of 16 in 2010 and 2011. In 2011 it won the Copa de la Reina, its first national title.

In 2012, Rivas achieved a berth to the Euroleague Women Final Eight at Istanbul, where it finished runner-up after being defeated in the final game by Ros Casares Valencia.

Three years later, in 2015, the club resigns to continue playing in Liga Femenina and came back to the second division. On 17 July 2017, the club decided to dissolve definitively the senior team due to the lack of sponsorship, thus competing only with the youth teams.

== Sponsorship naming ==
- Rivas Ciudad del Deporte 2000–2002
- Rivas Futura 2002–2008
- Rivas Ecópolis 2008–2015
- Rivas Promete 2015–2016
- Rivas Ecópolis 2016–

== Season by season ==
Season	Tier	Division	Pos.	Copa de la Reina	European competitions	
2000–01	2	1ª División	1st (Note: Invited to join the newly created Liga Femenina 2.)			
2001–02	2	Liga Femenina 2	1st			
2002–03	2	Liga Femenina 2	3rd			
2003–04	1	Liga Femenina	14th			
2004–05	2	Liga Femenina 2	1st			
2005–06	2	Liga Femenina 2	2nd			
2006–07	1	Liga Femenina	9th	Quarterfinalist		
2007–08	1	Liga Femenina	5th	Quarterfinalist		
2008–09	1	Liga Femenina	3rd	Quarterfinalist	2 EuroCup	R32
2009–10	1	Liga Femenina	3rd	Semifinalist	1 EuroLeague	R16
2010–11	1	Liga Femenina	4th	Champion	1 EuroLeague	R16
2011–12	1	Liga Femenina	4th	Semifinalist	1 EuroLeague	RU
2012–13	1	Liga Femenina	2nd	Champion	1 EuroLeague	2R
2013–14	1	Liga Femenina	1st	Runner-up	1 EuroLeague	2R
2014–15	1	Liga Femenina	7th (Note: Resigned to its place in Liga Femenina.)	Semifinalist		
2015–16	2	Liga Femenina 2	2nd			
2016–17	2	Liga Femenina 2	6th			

== Titles ==
- 1 Liga Femenina (2013–14)
- 2 Copa de la Reina (2011, 2013)

=== Record in European Competitions ===
- Euroleague
  - 2010: Round of 16
  - 2011: Round of 16
  - 2012: Runner-up
- Eurocup
  - 2009: Round of 32

== See also ==
- Liga Femenina de Baloncesto
