= CB Ciudad de Burgos =

Spanish women's basketball team

Beroil–Ciudad de Burgos
- Founded: 1996
- Dissolved: 2015
- Arena: Polideportivo El Plantío
- Location: Burgos, Spain
- President: Javier Ruiz
- Head coach: José Jesús Vázquez
- Website: ciudaddeburgos.net
Home	Away

Club Baloncesto Ciudad de Burgos was a women's professional Basketball team based in Burgos, Spain.

== History ==
CB Ciudad de Burgos was founded in 1996 as a merger of the two top teams of the city:

- CB Burgos
- CB Alfa

In 2000 finished as runner-up of the Copa de la Reina, and played the Ronchetti Cup the next season.

In the 2005–06 season finished in the third position and lost in the Liga Femenina semifinals against Perfumerías Avenida, but in the next year the team was relegated to Liga Femenina 2.

Three years later, in 2011, the club came back to Liga Femenina. In July 2014, the club announced it would not compete in any senior competitions and in 2015 it merged with other local club.

== Season by season ==
Season	Tier	Division	Pos.	Copa de la Reina	European competitions	
1997–98	1	Liga Femenina	5th			
1998–99	1	Liga Femenina	11th			
1999–00	1	Liga Femenina	8th	Runner-up		
2000–01	1	Liga Femenina	7th		2 Ronchetti Cup	R1
2001–02	1	Liga Femenina	10th			
2002–03	1	Liga Femenina	7th			
2003–04	1	Liga Femenina	11th			
2004–05	1	Liga Femenina	10th			
2005–06	1	Liga Femenina	6th	Quarterfinalist		
2006–07	1	Liga Femenina	3rd	Semifinalist		
2007–08	1	Liga Femenina	14th			
2008–09	2	Liga Femenina 2	1st			
2009–10	2	Liga Femenina 2	2nd			
2010–11	2	Liga Femenina 2	3rd			
2011–12	1	Liga Femenina	9th			
2012–13	1	Liga Femenina	5th			
2013–14	1	Liga Femenina	6th	Semifinalist		

== Notable players ==
- (Netherlands) Tanya Bröring
- (Spain) Anna Cruz
- (Chile) Ziomara Morrison
- (Australia) Jenny Whittle
