= Copa de la Reina de Baloncesto =

Spain's women's basketball cup

Copa de la Reina
- Current season, competition or edition: 2026 Copa de la Reina de Baloncesto
- Sport: Basketball
- Founded: 1943
- No. of teams: 8
- Country: Spain
- Continent: (European Union) Europe
- Most recent champions: Valencia Basket (2026, 2nd title)
- Most titles: Perfumerías Avenida (10 titles)
- Broadcasters: Teledeporte, RTVE Play
- Related competitions: LF; Supercopa de España de Baloncesto Femenino
- Website: feb.es

The Copa de la Reina de Baloncesto (English: Queen's Cup of Basketball) is an annual cup competition for Spanish women's basketball teams. The first edition of the competition, originally named Women's Senior Basketball Championship, took place in 1943, which makes it the oldest Spanish women's basketball competition, but it was only since 1978, when it took its current name, that it has been carried every year. The 2012 cup marked the 50th edition of the competition.

The cup is played by the top teams of the Spanish Women's League's table in the mid of the season. After several formats in previous years, the 2019 edition reverted to the Final Eight format.

CB Avenida is the defending champion and in 2019 won its eighth title, surpassing both Ros Casares and Picadero JC as the most successful team in the competition.

== List of winners ==
Season	Venue	Winner	Score	Runner-up
1943	Palma de Mallorca	RCD Espanyol	13–10	Real Madrid
1944	Vigo	Centro XI	16–12	RCD Espanyol
1945	Madrid	Centro XI	39–11	Buenavista XI
1946–1949	Undisputed			
1950	Gijón	Madrid XI	?	Guadalajara XI
1951	Madrid	Madrid XI	33–15	García Vives
1952	Barcelona	Madrid XI	32–20	Hispano Francés
1953	Madrid	Madrid XI	30–20	Barcelona XI
1954-1959	Undisputed			
1960	Zaragoza	Cottet Barcelona	36–34	Picadero
1961	San Sebastián	Medina A Coruña	27–22	CREFF Madrid
1962	Salamanca	CREFF Madrid	38–34	Indo Barcelona
1963	Barcelona	CREFF Madrid	33–28	Indo Barcelona
1964-1971	Undisputed			
1972	Tenerife	CREFF Madrid	45–44	Picadero
1973	Alcoy	Filomatic Picadero	46–39	Ignis Mataró
1974	Ávila	CREFF Madrid	64–48	Ignis Mataró
1975	Granada	Piceff	57–45	CREFF Madrid
1976-1977	Undisputed			
1978	León	Picadero	62–55	Celta de Vigo
1979	Badalona	Picadero Íntima	64–54	Celta de Vigo
1980	Alcalá de Henares	Picadero Íntima	83–82	Celta de Vigo
1981	Vigo	Celta Citroën	74–58	Picadero
1982	Ferrol	Celta Citroën	101–68	Complutense
1983	Guadalajara	Picadero Comansi	63–62	Celta de Vigo
1984	Santiago de Compostela	Celta Citroën	77–74	Real Canoe
1985	Seville	Comansi-Masnou	76–61	Coronas Light
1986	Tortosa	Tortosa Sabor d'Abans	69–67	Real Canoe
1987	Tenerife	Tortosa Sabor d'Abans	84–57	Arjeriz Xuncas
1988	Lugo	Tortosa Raventós	59–56	Arjeriz Xuncas
1989	Tenerife	Tortosa Tarragona	71–56	Inlusa Xuncas
1990	Jerez de la Frontera	Banco Zaragozano	95–94	Microbank-El Masnou
1991	Vigo	Dorna Godella	76–72	Real Canoe
1992	Gandía	Dorna Godella	89–82	Banco Zaragozano
1993	Granada	BEX - Banco Exterior	76–64	Godella
1994	Pamplona	Dorna Godella	79–77	BEX
1995	Valencia	Costa Naranja Godella	65–46	Gran Canaria
1996	Huesca	Real Canoe	84–69	Costa Naranja Godella
1997	Valladolid	Pool Getafe	75–43	Celta de Vigo
1998	Lugo	Pool Getafe	86–63	Gran Canaria
1999	Linares	Gran Canaria	69–44	CD Ensino
2000	Godella	Gran Canaria	73–48	Ciudad de Burgos
2001	Las Palmas	Celta de Vigo	66–64	Halcón Viajes
2002	Salamanca	Ros Casares	76–57	CD Ensino
2003	Zaragoza	Ros Casares	81–70	UB-Barça
2004	Palma de Mallorca	Ros Casares	72–67	Perfumerías Avenida
2005	Valencia	Perfumerías Avenida	74–68	Mann Filter Zaragoza
2006	León	Perfumerías Avenida	67–60	Ros Casares
2007	Jerez de la Frontera	Ros Casares	72–60	Perfumerías Avenida
2008	Seville	Ros Casares	68–66	San José
2009	Salamanca	Ros Casares	65–60	Puig d'en Valls
2010	Zaragoza	Ros Casares	64–62	Perfumerías Avenida
2011	Valencia	Rivas Ecópolis	63–59	Ros Casares
2012	Arganda del Rey	Perfumerías Avenida	68–57	Ros Casares
2013	Zamora	Rivas Ecópolis	83–62	Perfumerías Avenida
2014	Torrejón de Ardoz	Perfumerías Avenida	69–67	Rivas Ecópolis
2015	Torrejón de Ardoz	Perfumerías Avenida	66–62	Conquero Huelva Wagen
2016	San Sebastián	Conquero Huelva Wagen	60–52	Perfumerías Avenida
2017	Girona	Perfumerías Avenida	80–76	Spar CityLift Girona
2018	Zaragoza	Perfumerías Avenida	76–62	Spar CityLift Girona
2019	Vitoria-Gasteiz	Perfumerías Avenida	79–71	Spar CityLift Girona
2020	Salamanca	Perfumerías Avenida	76–58	Spar CityLift Girona
2021	Valencia	Spar Girona	72–62	Valencia Basket
2022	Valencia	Perfumerías Avenida	74–69	Spar Girona
2023	Zaragoza	Casademont Zaragoza	55–51	Perfumerías Avenida
2024	Huelva	Valencia Basket	77–53	Casademont Zaragoza
2025	Zaragoza	Hozono Global Jairis	67–59	Perfumerías Avenida
2026	Tarragona	Valencia Basket	70–65	Hozono Global Jairis

== Winners by titles ==
Team	Winners	Runners-up	Winning years
Perfumerías Avenida	10	8	2005, 2006, 2012, 2014, 2015, 2017, 2018, 2019, 2020, 2022
Picadero-El Masnou	7	4	1973, 1975, 1978, 1979, 1980, 1983, 1985
Ros Casares	7	3	2002, 2003, 2004, 2007, 2008, 2009, 2010
PB Godella-Pool Getafe	6	2	1991, 1992, 1994, 1995, 1997, 1998
Celta de Vigo	4	5	1981, 1982, 1984, 2001
CREFF Madrid	4	2	1962, 1963, 1972, 1974
Madrid XI	4	0	1950, 1951, 1952, 1953
Tortosa	4	0	1986, 1987, 1988, 1989
Islas Canarias	2	2	1999, 2000
Rivas Ecópolis	2	1	2011, 2013
Valencia Basket	2	1	2024, 2026
Centro XI	2	0	1944, 1945
Uni Girona CB	1	5	2021
Real Canoe	1	3	1996
RCD Espanyol	1	1	1943
Banco Zaragozano	1	1	1990
BEX	1	1	1993
CB Conquero	1	1	2016
Casademont Zaragoza	1	1	2023
CB Jairis	1	1	2025
Cottet Barcelona	1	0	1960
Medina A Coruña	1	0	1961
Xuncas Lugo	0	3	
Ensino Lugo	0	2	
Ignis Mataró	0	2	
Indo Barcelona	0	2	
Puig d'en Valls	0	1	
Mann Filter Zaragoza	0	1	
Buenavista XI	0	1	
Guadalajara XI	0	1	
Barcelona XI	0	1	
Hispano Francés	0	1	
García Vives	0	1	
Coronas Light	0	1	
Complutense	0	1	
Real Madrid	0	1	
UB-Barça	0	1	
Ciudad de Burgos	0	1	
CB San José	0	1	

== See also ==
- Liga Femenina
- Supercopa de España
