= 1999–2000 Liga Femenina de Baloncesto =

The 1998–99 Liga Femenina de Baloncesto was the 37th edition of Spain's premier championship for women's basketball clubs. Defending champion Celta Vigo defeated CB Islas Canarias in the play-off's final to win its fifth title. CD Ensino and Ros Casares Valencia also reached the play-offs. On the other hand, CB Tres Cantos and Baloncesto Alcalá were relegated as the bottom teams.

== Teams by autonomous community ==
Autonomous community	Teams
(Galicia (Spain)) Galicia	3: CD Ensino, Simeón Celta, Grupo 10 Cortegada
(Community of Madrid) Madrid	3: Baloncesto Alcalá, Real Canoe, CB Tres Cantos
(Castile and León) Castilla-León	2: Halcón Avenida, Ciudad de Burgos
Catalunya	2: Universitari Barcelona, CB Santa Rosa de Lima
Asturias	1: Universidad Oviedo
Comunidad Valenciana	1: Popular Godella
(Canary Islands) Islas Canarias	1: Sandra Islas Canarias
Navarra	1: CB Navarra

== Regular season ==
#	Teams	Pld	W	L	PF	PA	PS	Q/R
1	Sandra Islas Canarias	26	23	3	1969	1524	▲1	Qualified for the play-offs
2	Celta Vigo	26	21	5	1771	1467	▲1	Qualified for the play-offs
3	Yaya María Ensino	26	20	6	1890	1643	▼2	Qualified for the play-offs
4	Ros Casares Valencia	26	18	8	1876	1570	▲2	Qualified for the play-offs
5	Halcón Avenida	26	18	8	2036	1836	▼1	
6	Universitari Barcelona	26	17	9	1954	1718	▲3	
7	Real Canoe	26	15	11	1670	1653	▼2	
8	Ciudad de Burgos	26	14	12	1716	1701	▲3	
9	Grupo 10 Cortegada	26	13	13	1705	1637	▲1	
10	CB Santa Rosa de Lima	26	6	20	1490	1733	New entry	
11	Universidad Oviedo	26	6	20	1588	1854	▼3	
12	CB Navarra	26	5	21	1392	1760	Same position	
13	CB Tres Cantos	26	3	23	1507	2080	▼1	Relegated to 1ª División
14	Bal. Alcalá	26	3	23	1485	1873	New entry	Relegated to 1ª División

== Championship play-offs ==
=== Semifinals ===
Team #1	Agg.	Team #2	1st leg	2nd leg	3rd leg^{*}
Ros Casares Valencia	0-2	Sandra Islas Canarias	65–74	59–80	
Yaya María Ensino	0-2	Celta Vigo	72–73	63–91	

=== Final ===
Team #1	Agg.	Team #2	1st leg	2nd leg	3rd leg^{*}
Celta Vigo	2-1	Sandra Islas Canarias	55–63	68–60	62–54

Liga Femenina de Baloncesto 1999–2000 Champions
Celta Vigo
Fifth title
