= Lucila Pascua =

Spanish basketball player

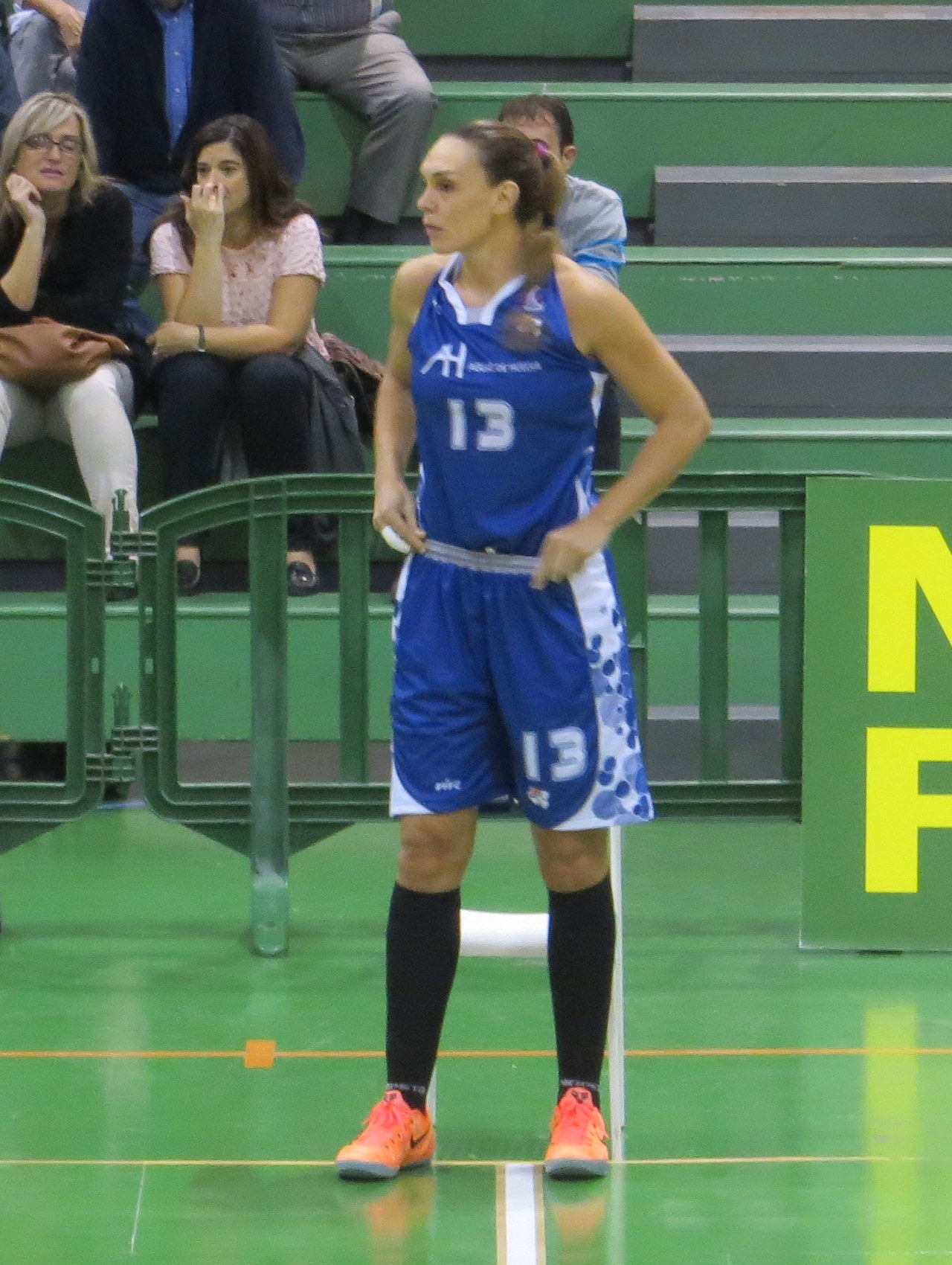
- Lucila Pascua in a game with CB Conquero

No. 13 – AE Sedis Bàsquet
- Position: Center
- League: Liga Femenina

Personal information
- Born: March 21, 1983 (age 43) Ripollet, Spain
- Listed height: 6 ft 5 in (1.96 m)

Career information
- Playing career: 2001–present

Career history
- 2001–2005: Mann Filter Zaragoza
- 2005–2009: CB San José León
- 2009–2011: Mann Filter Zaragoza
- 2011–2013: Perfumerías Avenida Salamanca
- 2013–2014: ŽKK Novi Zagreb
- 2013–2014: PINKK-Pécsi 424
- 2014–2016: CB Conquero
- 2016–2018: Mann-Filter
- 2018–2019: Lointek Gernika Bizkaia
- 2019-present: AE Sedis Bàsquet

Career highlights
- Spanish League champion (2013); 2× Spanish Cup champion (2012, 2016); 2× Spanish Supercup champion (2012, 2013); Hungarian League champion (2014); European SuperCup champion (2011)

María Lucila Pascua Suárez (born 21 March 1983) is a Spanish basketball center.

She is a member of the Spain women's national basketball team at the Olympic Games of Athens 2004, Beijing 2008, and Rio 2016, achieving a silver medal in the latter. She is amongst the few players of Spain with more than 200 caps, and shares with Amaya Valdemoro and Laia Palau, the distinction of representing Spain in 4 FIBA World Championship for Women where Spain won silver and bronze medals.

Having played most of her career in several professional teams in Spain, she signed with ŽKK Novi Zagreb at the beginning of season 2013–2014. At the middle of the season she was released and moved to PINKK-Pécsi 424 with whom she won the Hungarian League. She returned to Spain to play for CB Conquero during season 2014–2015. Since February 2019 she is at AE Sedis Bàsquet.

== Club career ==
Pascua started playing at age 9, at home club in Ripollet, and continued her formation at CN Sabadell. She then joined Segle XXI, a project of the Catalan Federation for young prospects. She made her debut in the Spanish League with Mann Filter at 18. In the following four years, she was chosen as Best Center in the 2002-03 league, participated in the 2003-04 Eurocup Women and was Spanish Cup runner-up in 2005. She spent the next four seasons at CB San José, participating in the Eurocup Women and again Spanish Cup runner-up in 2008. After two more years at Mann Filter, she signed for the 2010-11 Euroleague champions Perfumerías Avenida, where she went to win the 2012 Cup and the 2013 League.

She spent the 2013–14 season abroad, first at Croatian team ZKK Novi Zagreb and then at Hungarian team PINKK-Pécsi 424, winning the Hungarian League. Back in Spain, she spent two seasons at CB Conquero, winning the 2016 Spanish Cup. Two days after winning the Cup, she was released by the club, looking to get more playtime for the incoming 2016 Olympic Qualifying Tournament. She ended the season at Mann Filter, thus starting her third stint at Zaragoza. In November 2016, she became the League's all-time top rebounder with 2,510 rebounds, surpassing Érika de Souza.

== National team ==
She made her debut with Spain women's national basketball team at the age of 18. She has played with the senior team since 2001. She is one of the most capped players with a total of 244 caps and 3.7 PPG. She participated in three Olympic Games (Athens 2004, Beijing 2008 and Rio 2016), four World Championships and six European Championships:

- 1999 FIBA Europe Under-16 Championship for Women (youth)
- 5th 2002 FIBA Europe Under-18 Championship for Women (youth)
- 5th 2002 World Championship
- 2003 Eurobasket
- 6th 2004 Summer Olympics
- 2005 Eurobasket
- 8th 2006 World Championship
- 2007 Eurobasket
- 5th 2008 Summer Olympics
- 2009 Eurobasket
- 2010 World Championship
- 9th 2011 Eurobasket
- 2014 World Championship
- 2015 Eurobasket
- 2016 Summer Olympics
