= Quim Costa =

Spanish basketball player and coach

Personal information
- Born: 30 October 1957 (age 69) Badalona, Catalonia, Spain
- Listed height: 182 cm (6 ft 0 in)

Career information
- Playing career: 1974–1997
- Position: Point guard
- Number: 5
- Coaching career: 1992–present

Career history

Playing
- 1974–1982: Círculo Católico Badalona
- 1982–1983: FC Barcelona
- 1983–1986: Círculo Católico Badalona
- 1986–1990: FC Barcelona
- 1990–1992: CB Girona
- 1996–1997: Joventut Badalona (2 games)

Coaching
- 1992–1994: FC Barcelona (assistant)
- 1994–1996: CB Girona
- 1998–1999: FC Barcelona B
- 1999–2001: FC Barcelona (assistant)
- 2002–2006: CB Ciudad de Huelva
- 2007–2008: CB Lucentum Alicante
- 2008: Spain national team (assistant)
- 2008–2011: Unicaja (assistant)
- 2012–2016: CB Peñas Huesca
- 2017–2022: Bàsquet Girona

Career highlights
- As player: 5× Spanish League champion (1983, 1987–1990); 3× Spanish King's Cup winner (1983, 1987, 1988); FIBA Korać Cup champion (1987); Prince Asturias Cup winner (1987)

Joaquim Costa Puig (born 30 October 1957 in Badalona, Catalonia, Spain), commonly known as Quim Costa, is a retired Spanish professional basketball player, and a current professional basketball coach.

== Playing career ==
Costa played in 71 caps for the Spain national basketball team.

== Awards ==
- Liga ACB (5): 1982–83, 1986–87, 1987–88, 1988–89, 1989–90
- Copa del Rey (3): 1982–83, 1986–87, 1987–88
- Korać Cup (1): 1986–87
- Copa Príncipe de Asturias (1): 1987–88
