= Spanish league =

Spanish league may refer to:

== Sports ==
- Liga de Fútbol Profesional (Professional Football League), commonly known as La Liga, Primera División, and the "Spanish League," the professional football league in Spain
- Liga ACB, men's basketball
- Liga Femenina de Baloncesto, women's basketball

== Others ==
- League (unit)#Spain, Spanish league, an archaic unit of measurement
