= 1976–77 Liga Femenina de Baloncesto =

1976–77 Liga Femenina
- League: Liga Femenina
- Sport: Basketball
- Duration: 1976–1977
- Number of games: 132
- Number of teams: 12
- Finals champions: Celta de Vigo
- Runners-up: Evax Picadero

Liga Femenina seasons
- ← 1975–76 1977–78 →

The 1976–77 Liga Femenina de Baloncesto was the 14th edition of the Spanish premier women's basketball championship. Twelve teams took part in the championship and Celta de Vigo won its first title. Medicina Hispalense and Esclavas Textil Pascual were relegated. Mataró Famosette and Medina Lleida renounced at the end of the season.

Location of teams in 1975–76 Liga Femenina
Location of teams in 1975–76 Liga Femenina

== Regular season ==
Pos	Team	Pld	W	D	L	PF	PA	PD	Pts	Qualification or relegation
1	Celta de Vigo	22	22	0	0	1713	986	+727	44	Champion
2	Evax Picadero	22	19	0	3	1654	967	+687	38	
3	Mataró Famosette	22	17	0	5	1511	1167	+344	34	
4	CREFF Madrid	22	12	0	10	1547	1375	+172	24	
5	Tabacalera	22	10	0	12	1030	1231	−201	20	
6	Hispano Francés	22	10	0	12	1344	1331	+13	20	
7	Tenerife Krystal	22	10	0	12	1258	1292	−34	20	
8	Medina Almudena L'Oreal	22	10	0	12	1367	1580	−213	20	
9	Medina San Sebastián	22	10	0	12	1358	1480	−122	20	
10	Medina Lleida	22	6	0	16	1258	1527	−269	12	
11	Medicina Hispalense	22	4	0	18	1117	1667	−550	8	Relegated
12	Esclavas Textil Pascual	22	2	0	20	954	1508	−554	4	Relegated

Updated to match(es) played on unknown. Source:

1976–77 champions
Celta de Vigo
First title
