= Cindy Lima =

Spanish basketball player

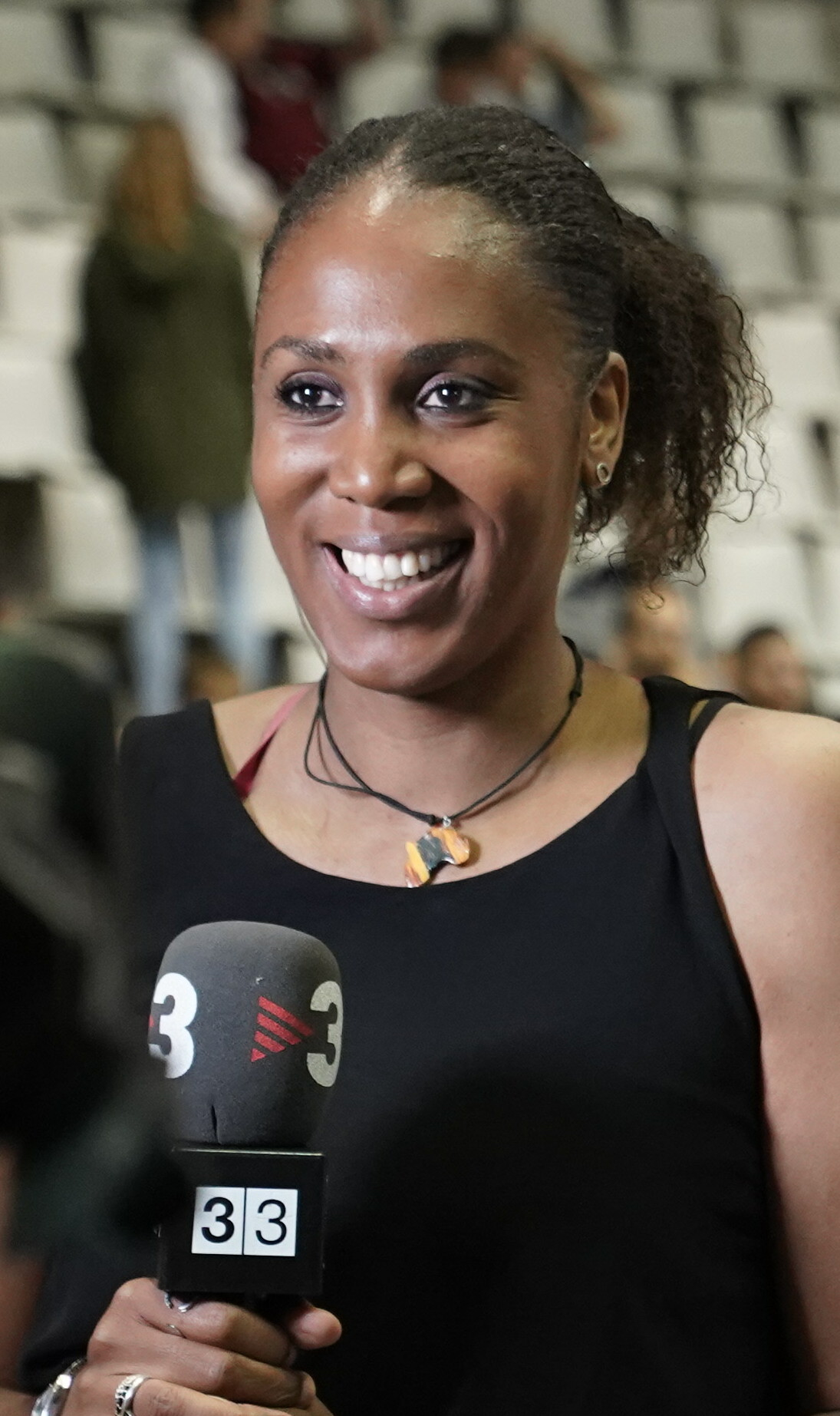

Personal information
- Born: 21 June 1981 (age 45) Barcelona, Spain
- Listed height: 196 cm (6 ft 5 in)
- Position: Center

Career history
- 1998-2000: UB-Barça
- 2000-2001: CAB Madeira
- 2001–2005: Celta de Vigo Baloncesto
- 2005–2007: Mann Filter
- 2007–2009: CB San José
- 2009–2010: TTT Riga / KV Imperial / Ros Casares
- 2010-2011: Ros Casares Valencia
- 2011–2012: Aix en Provence
- 2012–2013: Tarsus Beledeyesi / Uni Gyor
- 2013–2014: CB Conquero / Al-Gezira
- 2014–2015: SBS Ostrava / Tarbes

Career highlights
- Spanish League champion (2010)

Cindy Orquídea Lima García known as Cindy Lima (born 21 June 1981) is a Spanish former professional basketball player representing Spain, winning four medals including gold in the 2013 EuroBasket. She played in 15 teams and 9 countries in her career. She competed in the 2008 Summer Olympics.

== Club career ==
Born in Barcelona to a Cuban mother and an Angolan father, Lima played in youth clubs Inmaculada Horta, [[Segle XX] and Santa Rosa de Lima. She made her debut in the top tier of the Spanish League in 1998 with UB-Barça. After her second season, she signed for [Portugal|Portuguese]] club CAB Madeira, where she remained for one year. She spent the following eight seasons in Spain: four at Celta de Vigo Baloncesto, two at Mann Filter and two at CB San José León.

She played in a variety of clubs from 2009 onwards: Latvia's TTT Riga, Cyprus's KV Imperial and Spain's Ros Casares Valencia just in the 2009-2010 season. She played for French team Aix en Provence in 2011-12. The following season Lima played for Turkish Tarsus Beledeyesi and Hungarian Uni Győr. The 2013-2014 season started for Lima at CB Conquero in Spain and finished at Egyptian team Al Gezira. Her last season as a professional player started for Lima at Czech Republic's SBS Ostrava and finished in France, playing for Tarbes.

== National team ==
She made her debut with Spain women's national basketball team at the age of 26. She played with the senior team for 7 years, from 2007 to 2014, getting 120 caps and 3.4 PPG. She participated in the (Beijing 2008) Olympic tournament, one World Championships and four European Championships:

- 5th 1997 FIBA Europe Under-16 Championship for Women (youth)
- 1998 FIBA Europe Under-18 Championship for Women (youth)
- 5th 2000 FIBA Europe Under-20 Championship for Women (youth)
- 2007 Eurobasket
- 5th 2008 Summer Olympics
- 2009 Eurobasket
- 2010 World Championship
- 5th2011 Eurobasket
- 2013 Eurobasket
