= CD Universidad de Oviedo (basketball) =

Spanish basketball team

AD Universidad de Oviedo
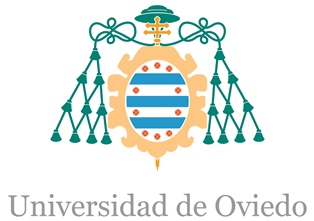
- Nickname: CAU (Club Atlético Universitario)
- Leagues: Liga EBA (men's), Primera Nacional Femenina (women's)
- Arena: Polideportivo Universitario de Oviedo
- Location: Oviedo, Principality of Asturias
- Team colors: Green, white
- Ownership: University of Oviedo
- Website: https://deportes.uniovi.es/competicion/federado
Home	Away

Asociación Deportiva Universidad de Oviedo are the men's and women's basketball teams of the University of Oviedo. Based in Oviedo, the men's team plays in Liga EBA and the women's plays in Primera Nacional Femenina.

In other time, the team was known as Club Atlético Universitario (CAU).

== Season by season ==
-

=== Men's team ===
Season	Tier	Division	Pos.	W–L
1971–72	3	3ª División	7th	19–1–2
1972–73	3	3ª División	1st	24–1–4
1973–74	2	2ª División	?	
1974–75	2	2ª División	7th	17–11
1975–76	2	2ª División	9th	10–1–13
1976–77	2	2ª División	10th	12–16
1977–78	2	2ª División	6th (Note: After the end of the season, the club resigned to its berth in the second division; renamed Primera División B.)	17–1–12
1978–00	Lower divisions			
2000–01	4	1ª División	2nd	
2001–02	5	1ª División	6th	6–10
2002–03	5	1ª División	5th	6–8
2003–04	5	1ª División	3rd	12–10
2004–05	5	1ª División	4th	9–10
2005–06	5	1ª División	6th	6–10
2006–07	5	1ª División	3rd	9–14
2007–08	6	1ª División	4th	12–12
2008–09	6	1ª División	3rd	22–7
2009–10	4	Liga EBA	15th	9–17
2010–11	4	Liga EBA	14th	10–12
2011–12	4	Liga EBA	12th	10–12
2012–18	Did not enter any competition			
2018–19	7	2ª Autonómica	7th	14–4
2019–20	7	2ª Autonómica	1st	11–0
2020–21	5	1ª División	8th	2–8
2021–22	5	1ª División	3rd	–
2022–23	5	1ª División	1st	20–0

=== Women's team ===
Season	Tier	Division	Pos.	W–L	Copa de la Reina
1987–88	3	2ª División			
1988–89	2	1ª División B			
1989–90	2	1ª División B			
1990–91	2	1ª División B			
1991–92	2	1ª División B			
1992–93	2	1ª División B			
1993–94	2	1ª División B			
1994–95	1	1ª División	12th	2–22	1st Round
1995–96	1	1ª División	11th (Note: After the season 1995–96, the team remained in the league after the existence of vacant berths.)	5–17	1st Round
1996–97	1	Liga Femenina	8th	9–13	Quarterfinals
1997–98	1	Liga Femenina	9th	7–15	Quarterfinals
1998–99	1	Liga Femenina	8th	11–15	Quarterfinals
1999–00	1	Liga Femenina	11th (Note: After the end of the season, the club resigned to its berth in the league. Another team from Oviedo, CB Vetusta, take it)	6–20	
2000–01	2	1ª División			
2001–02	1	Liga Femenina	14th	1–25	
2002–03	2	Liga Femenina 2	11th	9–17	
2003–04	2	Liga Femenina 2	13th	7–19	
2004–05	3	1ª División	3rd		
2005–06	3	1ª División	1st		
2006–07	3	1ª División	4th		
2007–08	3	1ª División	5th		
2008–09	3	1ª División	7th		
2009–10	3	1ª División	1st		
2010–11	3	1ª División	1st		
2011–12	3	1ª División	1st		
2012–13	2	Liga Femenina 2	7th	8–12	
2013–14	2	Liga Femenina 2	8th	8–14	
2014–15	2	Liga Femenina 2	10th	4–18	
2015–16	2	Liga Femenina 2	13th (Note: After the season 2015–16, the team remained in the league after the existence of vacant berths.)	5–21	
2016–17	2	Liga Femenina 2	13th (Note: After the season 2016–17, the team remained in the league after the existence of vacant berths.)	8–18	
2017–18	2	Liga Femenina 2	14th	2–24	
2018–19	4	1ª Autonómica	1st		
2019–20	3	1ª División			
2020–21	3	1ª División			
2021–22	4	1ª División			
2022–23	4	1ª División	9th	11–13	
