= 1964 Liga Femenina de Baloncesto =

1964 Liga Femenina
- League: Liga Femenina
- Sport: Basketball
- Duration: February–April 1964
- Number of games: 30
- Number of teams: 8
- Finals champions: CREFF Madrid
- Runners-up: Medina Madrid

Liga Femenina seasons
- 1965 →

The 1964 Liga Femenina de Baloncesto was the 1st edition of the Spanish premier women's basketball championship. It took place from 23 February to 26 April 1964. Eight teams took part in the championship and CREFF Madrid won the first title. No teams were relegated due an expansion, Medina San Sebastián and Juventud Fantasit were promoted from Segunda División.

== First round ==
=== Group A ===
Pos	Team	Pld	W	L	PF	PA	PD	Pts	Qualification or relegation
1	Medina Madrid	6	4	2	0	0	0	10	Qualification to playoffs
2	CREFF Madrid	6	4	2	0	0	0	10	Qualification to playoffs
3	Granada	6	2	4	0	0	0	8	
4	Medina La Coruña	6	2	4	0	0	0	8	

Team	MED	CRE	GRA	COR
Medina Madrid		36–32	45–30	
CREFF Madrid			49–35	61–22
Granada		38–36		
Medina La Coruña	17–38	37–51	33–32	

Legend: Blue = left column team win; Yellow = draw; Red = top row team win.

=== Group B ===
Pos	Team	Pld	W	L	PF	PA	PD	Pts	Qualification or relegation
1	Indo Barcelona	6	4	2	0	0	0	10	Qualification to playoffs
2	Zaragoza	6	4	2	0	0	0	10	Qualification to playoffs
3	Picadero	6	2	4	0	0	0	8	
4	Royce-Dimar Valencia	6	2	4	0	0	0	8	

Team	IND	ZAR	PIC	VAL
Indo Barcelona		52–20	39–18	37–17
Zaragoza	49–39		46–52	48–37
Picadero	32–56	41–55		37–19
Royce-Dimar Valencia	38–33		42–25	

Legend: Blue = left column team win; Yellow = draw; Red = top row team win.

== Finals ==
Pos	Team	Pld	W	L	PF	PA	PD	Pts
1	CREFF Madrid	3	3	0	149	112	+37	6
2	Medina Madrid	3	2	1	138	107	+31	5
3	Zaragoza	3	1	2	127	169	−42	4
4	Indo Barcelona	3	0	3	107	133	−26	3

=== Round 1 ===
24 April 1964
19:00

Boxscore

CREFF Madrid	73–43	Zaragoza
Scoring by half: 30–13, 43–30
Pts: A. Couchoud 20		Pts: Calvo 21

Polideportivo, Madrid
Referees: Garcés, Morer

24 April 1964
20:30

Boxscore

Medina Madrid	50–30	Indo Barcelona
Scoring by half: 12–22, 38–8
Pts: Martínez, Gómez 12		Pts: Vilas 8

Polideportivo, Madrid
Referees: Palau, Villamil

=== Round 2 ===
25 April 1964
19:00

Boxscore

Zaragoza	48–46 (OT)	Indo Barcelona
Pts: Planas, Calvo 15		Pts: Gimeno 17

Polideportivo, Madrid
Referees: Balasch, Morer

25 April 1964
20:30

Boxscore

CREFF Madrid	41–38	Medina Madrid
Scoring by half: 17–17, 24–21
Pts: T. Pérez 13		Pts: Martínez 14

Polideportivo, Madrid
Referees: Barbero, Molinero

=== Round 3 ===
26 April 1964
11:00

Boxscore

CREFF Madrid	35–31	Indo Barcelona
Scoring by half: 17–16, 18–15
Pts: Dicenante 8		Pts: Bovet 12

Polideportivo, Madrid
Referees: Balasch, Garcés

26 April 1964
12:30

Boxscore

Medina Madrid	50–36	Zaragoza
Scoring by half: 19–14, 31–22
Pts: Gómez de Frutos 26		Pts: Planas 19

Polideportivo, Madrid
Referees: Sancho, Morer

1964 champions
CREFF Madrid
First title
