= 1965–66 Liga Femenina de Baloncesto =

1965–66 Liga Femenina
- League: Liga Femenina
- Sport: Basketball
- Duration: December 1965–April 1966
- Number of games: 61
- Number of teams: 11
- Finals champions: Medina La Coruña
- Runners-up: CREFF Madrid

Liga Femenina seasons
- ← 1965 1966–67 →

The 1965–66 Liga Femenina de Baloncesto was the 3rd edition of the Spanish premier women's basketball championship. It took place from 5 December to 24 April 1966. Eleven teams took part in the championship and Medina La Coruña won its first title. Zaragoza and Medina Madrid were relegated after losing the promotion league with Standard Madrid. Alhamar Granada renounced at the end of the season.

== First round ==
=== Group A ===
Pos	Team	Pld	W	L	PF	PA	PD	Pts	Qualification or relegation
1	CREFF Madrid	8	7	1	431	268	+163	15	Qualified for finals
2	Medina La Coruña	8	7	1	347	292	+55	15	Qualified for finals
3	Juventud Kalso	8	3	5	278	319	−41	11	
4	Estudiantes Vigo	8	3	5	322	350	−28	11	
5	Zaragoza	8	0	8	250	446	−196	8	Promoted for relegation

Updated to match(es) played on unknown. Source:

=== Group B ===
Pos	Team	Pld	W	L	PF	PA	PD	Pts	Qualification or relegation
1	Alhamar Granada	10	9	1	431	268	+163	19	Qualified for finals
2	Mataró Molfort's	10	7	3	395	314	+81	17	Qualified for finals
3	Picadero Damm	10	6	4	409	369	+40	16	
4	Dimar Valencia	9	4	5	307	351	−44	13	
5	Medina San Sebastián	9	2	7	284	388	−104	11	
6	Medina Madrid	10	1	9	243	379	−136	11	Promoted for relegation

Updated to match(es) played on unknown. Source:

== Finals ==
Pos	Team	Pld	W	L	PF	PA	PD	Pts
1	Medina La Coruña	6	4	2	252	211	+41	10
2	CREFF Madrid	6	4	2	275	229	+46	10
3	Alhamar Granada	6	3	3	211	211	0	9
4	Mataró Molfort's	6	1	5	174	256	−82	7

Updated to match(es) played on unknown. Source:

1965–1966 Champions
Medina La Coruña
First title
