= Nadia Fingall =

American basketball player (born 1998)

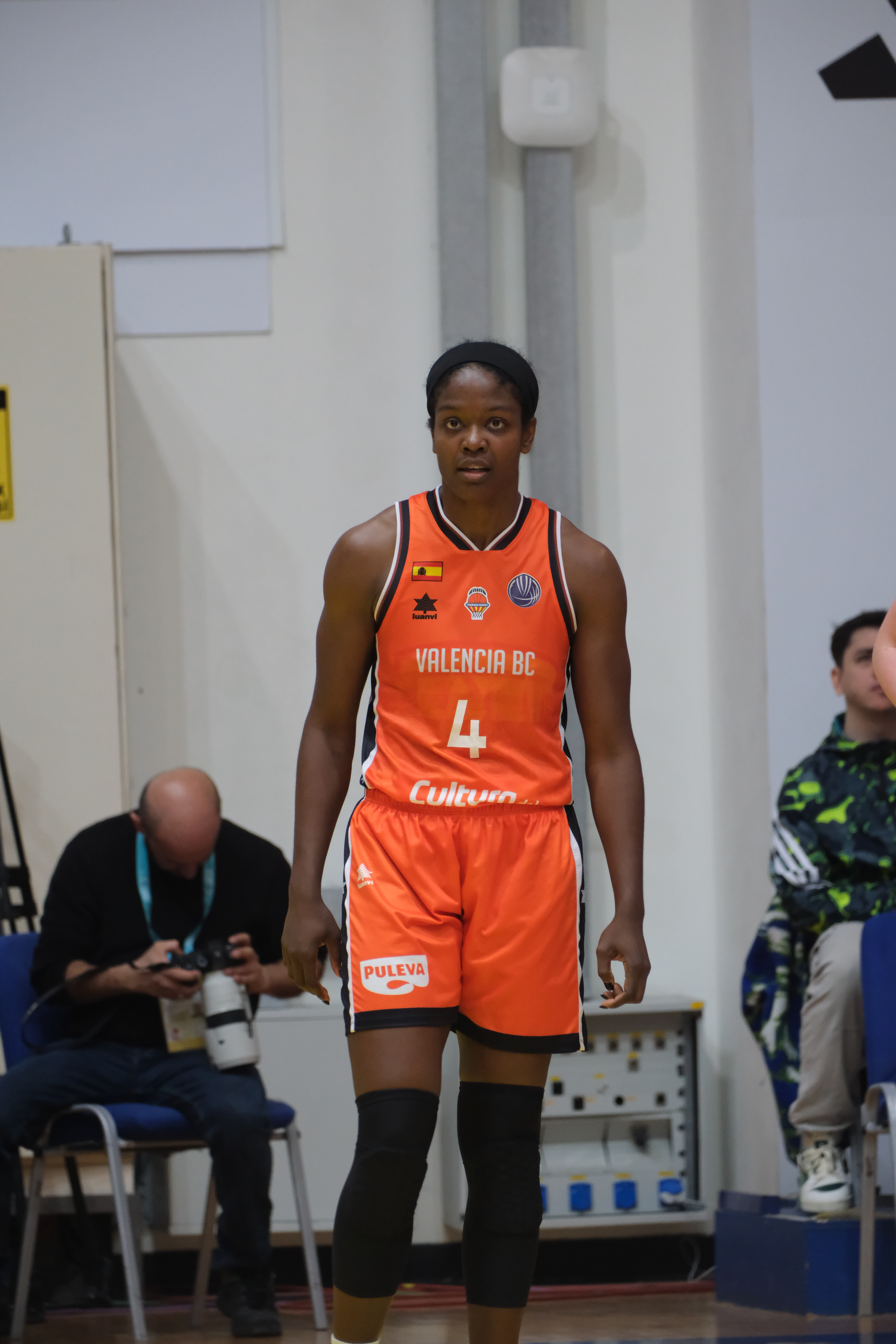
- Fingall with Valencia Basket in 2025

Personal information
- Born: August 12, 1998 (age 28) Belleville, New Jersey
- Listed height: 6 ft 4 in (1.93 m)

Career information
- College: Stanford
- Playing career: 2021–present
- Position: Center
- Number: 45

Career history
- 2021–2023: Estudiantes
- 2023–2026: Valencia Basket
- 2026–: Golden State Valkyries

Career highlights
- 2x Liga Femenina de Baloncesto champion (2024, 2025); 2x Supercopa de España winner (2023, 2024); Copa de la Reina winner (2024); Supercopa de España MVP (2024)
- Stats at Basketball Reference

Nadia Angelique Fingall (born August 12, 1998) is an American professional basketball player who played for the Golden State Valkyries (waived in September 2026) previously played for Valencia Basket of the Liga Femenina de Baloncesto and the EuroLeague.

== Professional career ==
Trained at Stanford University, Fingall signed for Nou Bàsquet Paterna, a team affiliated with Valencia Basket, for the 2020-21 season. The following season she made the leap to the Liga Femenina by signing for Movistar Estudiantes, renewing for a second season. On May 22, 2023, her signing with Valencia Basket was announced. During her time in Valencia, her team won the Supercopa de España twice with Fingall herself won the MVP in the 2024 edition.

On June 7th, 2026, the Golden State Valkyries signed Fingall to a Rest-of-Season Contract. She has since been waived.
