= 1975–76 Liga Femenina de Baloncesto =

1975–76 Liga Femenina
- League: Liga Femenina
- Sport: Basketball
- Duration: 1975–1976
- Games: 132
- Teams: 12
- Finals champions: Evax Picadero
- Runners-up: Mataró Famosette

Liga Femenina seasons
- ← 1974–75 1976–77 →

The 1975–76 Liga Femenina de Baloncesto was the 13th edition of the Spanish premier women's basketball championship. Twelve teams competed in the championship, with Evax Picadero claiming their second league title. Medina Madrid and CREFF Girona were relegated. Hispano Italiano and Medina Bilbao withdrew from the competition.

Location of teams in 1975–76 Liga Femenina

== Regular season ==
| Pos | Team | Pld | W | D | L | PF | PA | PD | Pts | Qualification or relegation |
|---|---|---|---|---|---|---|---|---|---|---|
| 1 | Evax Picadero | 22 | 20 | 0 | 2 | 1564 | 828 | +736 | 40 | Champion |
| 2 | Mataró Famosette | 22 | 16 | 0 | 6 | 1389 | 972 | +417 | 32 | |
| 3 | Celta de Vigo | 22 | 16 | 0 | 6 | 1120 | 931 | +189 | 32 | |
| 4 | CREFF Madrid | 22 | 15 | 1 | 6 | 1490 | 1044 | +446 | 31 | |
| 5 | Hispano Francés | 22 | 14 | 0 | 8 | 1144 | 1036 | +108 | 28 | |
| 6 | Tabacalera | 22 | 13 | 1 | 8 | 1204 | 1140 | +64 | 27 | |
| 7 | Medina Lleida | 22 | 13 | 0 | 9 | 1098 | 1113 | −15 | 26 | |
| 8 | Hispano Italiano | 22 | 8 | 0 | 14 | 996 | 1371 | −375 | 16 | |
| 9 | Medina Bilbao | 22 | 7 | 0 | 15 | 1039 | 1389 | −350 | 14 | |
| 10 | Medina Almudena | 22 | 5 | 0 | 17 | 1142 | 1406 | −264 | 10 | |
| 11 | Medina Madrid | 22 | 2 | 0 | 20 | 932 | 1405 | −473 | 4 | Relegated |
| 12 | CREFF Girona | 22 | 2 | 0 | 20 | 866 | 1349 | −483 | 4 | Relegated |

=== Results ===
| Home \ Away | CEL | GIR | CRM | PIC | FRA | ITA | MAT | MEA | MEB | MEL | MEM | TAB |
|---|---|---|---|---|---|---|---|---|---|---|---|---|
| Celta de Vigo | | 72–24 | 49–37 | 51–45 | 48–23 | 43–31 | 48–37 | 53–29 | 62–50 | 50–29 | 44–23 | 55–50 |
| CREFF Girona | 37–75 | | 37–59 | 23–52 | 40–69 | 53–54 | 41–62 | 43–53 | 40–48 | 46–33 | 37–34 | 57–63 |
| CREFF Madrid | 50–32 | 102–38 | | 49–84 | 66–44 | 83–47 | 62–61 | 80–48 | 96–38 | 78–52 | 82–37 | 92–37 |
| Evax Picadero | 77–32 | 80–32 | 38–37 | | 106–44 | 78–38 | 53–46 | 95–43 | 77–42 | 79–36 | 97–26 | 81–26 |
| Hispano Francés | 55–49 | 51–29 | 53–51 | 41–56 | | 59–38 | 43–53 | 65–46 | 63–27 | 35–38 | 70–24 | 48–33 |
| Hispano Italiano | 22–60 | 57–40 | 32–78 | 30–58 | 30–75 | | 41–63 | 53–52 | 54–44 | 52–46 | 57–45 | 56–55 |
| Mataró Famosette | 69–38 | 78–32 | 56–45 | 41–48 | 73–54 | 76–50 | | 75–50 | 90–30 | 60–21 | 83–36 | 56–29 |
| Medina Almudena | 56–63 | 55–39 | 63–74 | 38–87 | 43–47 | 63–60 | 45–82 | | 52–34 | 55–65 | 67–47 | 63–64 |
| Medina Bilbao | 43–55 | 57–56 | 43–77 | 40–78 | 45–58 | 85–59 | 50–74 | 84–70 | | 51–45 | 55–52 | 47–49 |
| Medina Lleida | 45–42 | 72–45 | 53–46 | 52–46 | 34–37 | 77–48 | 63–53 | 70–49 | 59–48 | | 69–52 | 44–41 |
| Medina Madrid | 42–55 | 48–41 | 49–93 | 37–84 | 49–64 | 44–51 | 35–62 | 57–50 | 50–54 | 42–52 | | 47–65 |
| Tabacalera | 57–44 | 75–36 | 53–53 | 24–65 | 58–46 | 94–36 | 58–39 | 69–52 | 73–24 | 58–43 | 73–56 | |

Legend: Blue = home team win; Yellow = draw; Red = away team win.

1975–76 champions
Evax Picadero
Second title
