= Laura Antoja =

Spanish basketball player

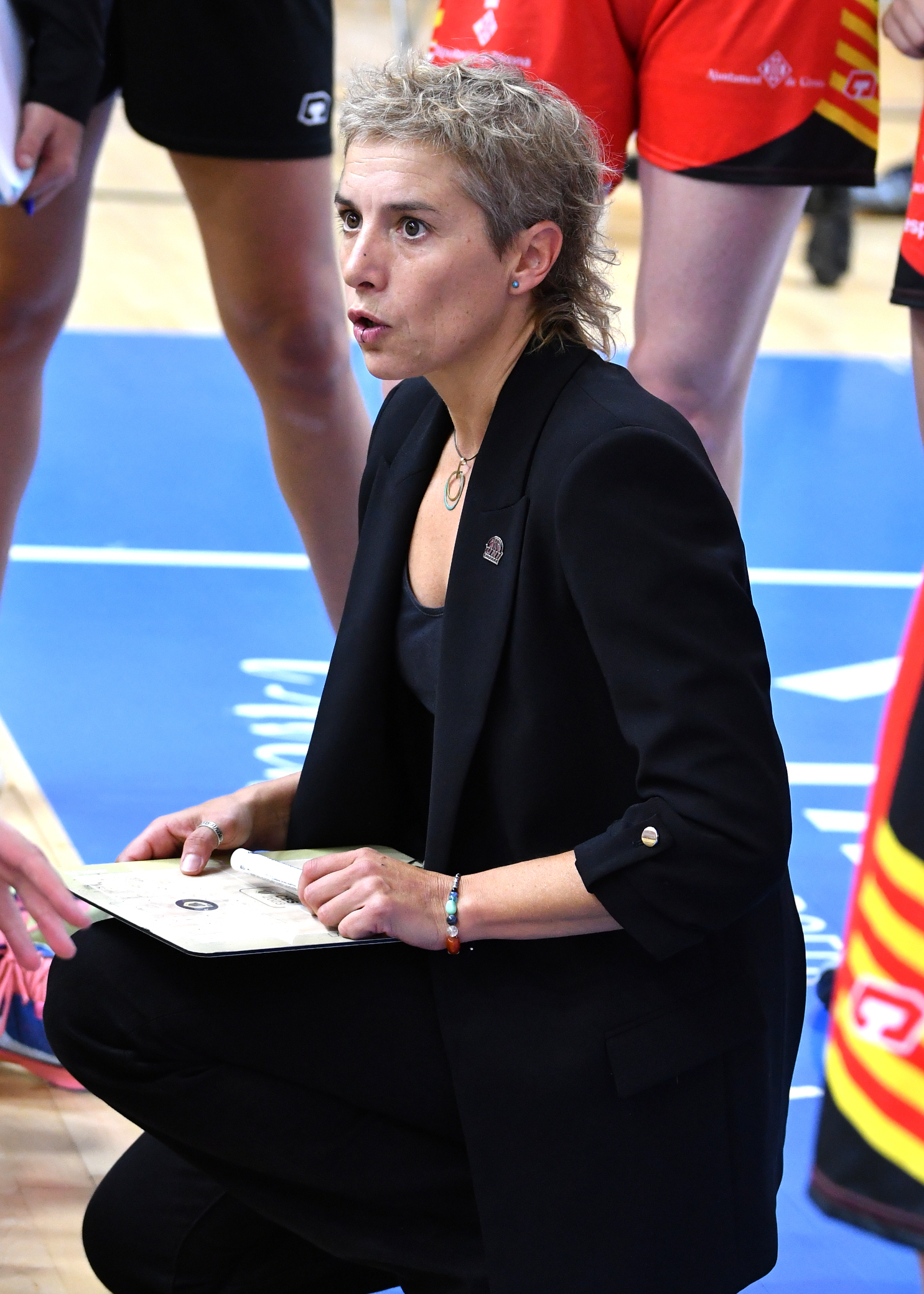
Image of Laura Antoja

Laura Antoja Rovira (born 11 September 1977) is a former Spanish basketball player; her last team was CB Avenida in Spanish League and Euroleague. She was born in Barcelona, and is a 1.66 m guard.

== Career ==
- 1997-1999 Universitari Barcelona
- 2000-2001 AE Centre Sanfeliu
- 2001-2004 Sedis Bàsquet
- 2004-2006 UB - FC Barcelona
- 2006-2007 Txingudi SBE
- 2007-2008 CD Covíbar
- 2008-2009 CDB Zaragoza
- 2009-2011 Uni Girona CB
- 2011-2013 CB Avenida

== Titles ==
- 2011: Spanish Women's Basketball Supercup
- 2011: FIBA Europe SuperCup Women
- 2012: Copa de la Reina de baloncesto
- 2012: Spanish Women's Basketball Supercup
- 2013: Liga Femenina
