= Ingrid Pons =

Spanish basketball player

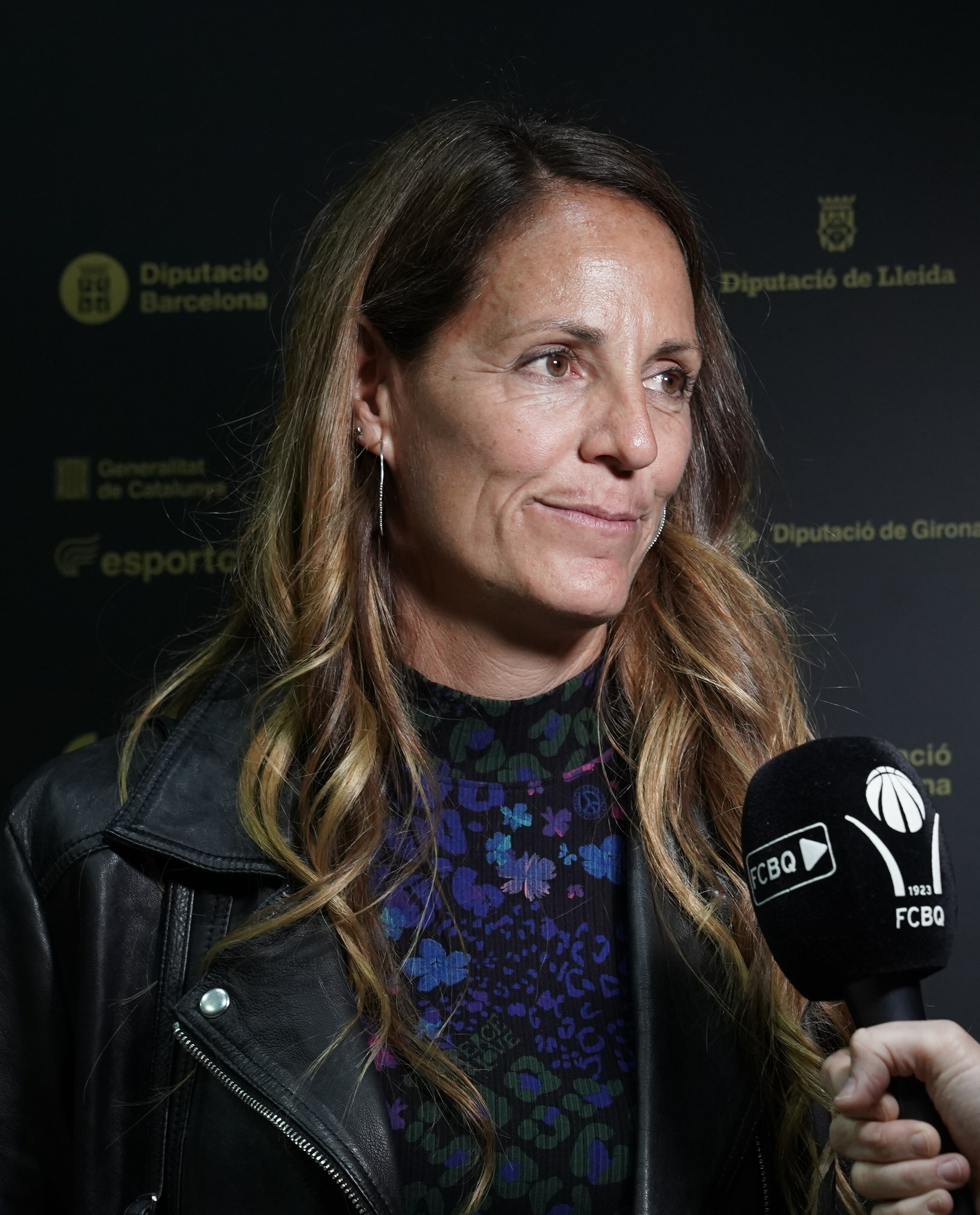

Personal information
- Born: February 27, 1975 (age 51) Montgat, Barcelona
- Listed height: 185 cm (6 ft 1 in)

Career information
- Playing career: 1992–2008
- Position: Power forward

Career history
- 1992-1998: Universitari Barcelona
- 1998–2004: Popular Godella / Ros Casares
- 2004-2007: Universitari Barcelona
- 2007-2008: EBE Promociones PDV

Career highlights
- 4× Spanish League champion (2001, 2002, 2004, 2005); 3x Spanish Cup champion (2002, 2003, 2004)

Íngrid Pons Molina (born 27 February 1975 in Montgat) is a Spanish former basketball player who played for the Spanish National team from 1996 to 2004, winning two bronze medals in the 2001 and 2003 Eurobaskets. She competed in the 2004 Summer Olympics.

== Club career ==
Pons spent her formative years in clubs in nearby Barcelona: Montgat, Mireria and Segle XXI. She played for 16 years in the Spanish top tier league at Universitari Barcelona (1992-1998, 2004-2007) and Popular Godella / Ros Casares (1998-2004), winning a total of four leagues and three domestic cups. She retired in 2008 at EBE Promociones PDV.

== National team ==
She made her debut with Spain women's national basketball team at the age of 21. She played with the senior team for 8 years, from 1996 to 2004. She is one of the most capped players with a total of 127 caps and 6.1 PPG. She participated in the (Athens 2004 Olympics, two World Championships and three European Championships:

- 9th 1991 FIBA Europe Under-16 Championship for Women (youth)
- 5th 1997 Eurobasket
- 5th 1998 World Championship
- 2001 Eurobasket
- 5th 2002 World Championship
- 2003 Eurobasket
- 6th 2004 Summer Olympics
