= 1971–72 Liga Femenina de Baloncesto =

1971–72 Liga Femenina
- League: Liga Femenina
- Sport: Basketball
- Duration: 17 October 1971–26 March 1972
- Number of games: 132
- Number of teams: 12
- Finals champions: Ignis Mataró
- Runners-up: Picadero Damm

Liga Femenina seasons
- ← 1970–71 1972–73 →

The 1971–72 Liga Femenina de Baloncesto was the 9th edition of the Spanish premier women's basketball championship. It took place from 17 October 1971 to 26 March 1972. Twelve teams took part in the championship and Ignis Mataró won its first title. Medina La Coruña was relegated.

== Regular season ==
Pos	Team	Pld	W	D	L	PF	PA	PD	Pts	Qualification or relegation
1	Ignis Mataró	22	21	0	1	1303	856	+447	42	Champion
2	Picadero Damm	22	19	0	3	1016	737	+279	38	
3	Tabaquero	22	15	0	7	1269	986	+283	30	
4	CREFF Madrid	22	14	0	8	1127	834	+293	28	
5	Celta de Vigo	22	11	0	11	1029	1061	−32	22	
6	Águilas Schweppes	22	10	2	10	811	907	−96	22	
7	CREFF Girona	22	10	0	12	969	1068	−99	20	
8	San José Dimar	22	9	0	13	898	1025	−127	18	Promoted for relegation
9	Medina Madrid	22	6	2	14	880	1099	−219	14	Promoted for relegation
10	Standard	22	4	3	15	794	989	−195	11	Promoted for relegation
11	Medina Almudena	22	4	2	16	854	1065	−211	10	Promoted for relegation
12	Medina La Coruña	22	4	1	17	850	1193	−343	9	Relegated

=== Results ===
Home \ Away	AGU	CEL	GIR	CRM	MAT	MEA	MLC	MEM	PIC	SJD	STA	TAB
Águilas Schweppes		59–49	34–30	32–45	54–53	32–34	45–45	33–28	36–49	63–42	27–27	40–39
Celta de Vigo	43–21		59–42	40–37	33–43	58–37	58–30	49–40	40–41	46–45	52–37	36–39
CREFF Girona	31–29	57–45		43–42	48–49	55–39	56–39	61–35	46–58	54–38	48–38	25–67
CREFF Madrid	36–23	73–44	59–30		45–47	68–31	83–28	58–41	26–41	59–44	64–28	44–43
Ignis Mataró	56–16	77–49	88–35	57–45		60–31	80–28	81–26	48–38	56–39	49–32	75–44
Medina Almudena	32–33	55–51	40–54	29–44	42–61		67–41	38–40	26–43	39–45	30–41	42–51
Medina La Coruña	27–41	40–54	45–65	29–62	37–57	46–40		33–38	41–62	40–54	59–53	39–46
Medina Madrid	34–46	46–48	53–43	40–61	41–60	42–42	38–48		18–47	56–36	58–51	53–49
Picadero Damm	63–28	62–43	52–46	34–32	45–55	52–36	43–37	48–27		64–26	44–24	44–31
San José Dimar	51–38	55–38	36–30	40–37	36–50	37–39	43–40	46–43	27–33		41–38	36–54
Standard	35–45	36–43	42–31	22–54	33–53	39–39	38–39	42–42	23–40	36–27		42–41
Tabaquero	58–36	89–51	81–39	68–51	74–78	72–46	70–39	77–41	41–28	72–54	63–37	

Legend: Blue = home team win; Yellow = draw; Red = away team win.

=== Promotion ===
Team 1	Agg.	Team 2	1st leg	2nd leg
Medina Magisterio	101–113	San José Dimar	62–53	39–60
Medina Madrid	95–74	Medina Valencia	54–42	41–32
Medina San Sebastián	77–99	Standard	38–53	39–46
Hispano Francés	74–87	Medina Almudena	44–42	30–45

1971–72 champions

Ignis Mataró
First title
