= Supercopa de España de Baloncesto Femenino =

Supercopa de Baloncesto Femenino
- Current season, competition or edition: 2026 Supercopa de Baloncesto Femenino
- Sport: Basketball
- Founded: 2003
- First season: 2003
- No. of teams: 4
- Country: Spain
- Continent: Europe
- Most recent champions: Valencia Basket (2026)
- Most titles: Perfumerías Avenida (9 titles)
- Broadcaster: Teledeporte
- Related competitions: LF; Copa de la Reina
- Website: feb.es

The Supercopa de España de Baloncesto Femenino (English: Spanish Women's Basketball Supercup) is an annual preseason Spanish professional women's basketball competition.

== Format ==
The teams that take part in this competition are:

- The Liga Femenina winner of the previous season.
- The Copa de la Reina winner of the previous season (or the Cup's runner-up if both teams coincide)

== Winners by season ==
Season	Host	Venue	Champion	Score	Runner-up	MVP
2003	Valencia	Fuente de San Luis	Ros Casares	69–60	UB-Barça	(Australia) Sandy Brondello
2004	Salamanca	Pabellón de Wurzburg	Ros Casares	70–56	Perfumerías Avenida	(Spain) Amaya Valdemoro
2005	Barcelona	Palau Blaugrana	UB-Barça	62–55	Perfumerías Avenida	(Spain) Marta Fernández
2006	Salamanca	Pabellón de Wurzburg	Ros Casares	83–72	Perfumerías Avenida	(Spain) Elisa Aguilar
2007	Valencia	Fuente de San Luis	Ros Casares	68–61	Perfumerías Avenida	(Spain) Elisa Aguilar
2008	Valencia	Fuente de San Luis	Ros Casares	72–50	Feve San José	(Spain) Laia Palau
2009	Valencia	Fuente de San Luis	Ros Casares	68–64	Palacio de Congresos de Ibiza	(Brazil) Érika de Souza
2010	Valencia	Fuente de San Luis	Perfumerías Avenida	76–72	Ros Casares	(Saint Vincent and the Grenadines) (Spain) Sancho Lyttle
2011	Salamanca	Pabellón de Wurzburg	Perfumerías Avenida	77–65	Rivas Ecópolis	(United States) DeWanna Bonner
2012	Salamanca	Pabellón de Wurzburg	Perfumerías Avenida	68–59	Spar UniGirona	(United States) Roneeka Hodges
2013	Salamanca	Pabellón de Wurzburg	Perfumerías Avenida	62–57	Rivas Ecópolis	(United States) Shay Murphy
2014	Leganés	Pabellón Europa	Perfumerías Avenida	87–52	Rivas Ecópolis	(Spain) Marta Xargay
2015	Girona	Palau Girona-Fontajau	Spar UniGirona	61–59	Perfumerías Avenida	(United States) Chelsea Gray
2016	Salamanca	Pabellón de Wurzburg	Perfumerías Avenida	83–70	IDK Gipuzkoa	(Nigeria) Adaora Elonu
2017	Salamanca	Pabellón de Wurzburg	Perfumerías Avenida	61–55	Spar UniGirona	(Brazil) Érika de Souza
2018	Salamanca	Pabellón de Wurzburg	Perfumerías Avenida	72–62	Spar Citylift Girona	(Brazil) Érika de Souza
2019	Girona	Palau Girona-Fontajau	Spar Citylift Girona	82–80	Perfumerías Avenida	(Nigeria) Adaora Elonu
2020	Bilbao	Bilbao Arena	Perfumerías Avenida	66–50	Lointek Gernika Bizkaia	(Serbia) Nikolina Milić
2021	San Cristóbal de La Laguna	Pabellón Santiago Martín	Valencia Basket	81–63	Perfumerías Avenida	(Spain) Cristina Ouviña
2022	Vitoria-Gasteiz	Polideportivo Mendizorrotza	Spar Girona	70–65	Valencia Basket	(United States) Rebekah Gardner
2023	Las Palmas	Gran Canaria Arena	Valencia Basket	78–73	Perfumerías Avenida	(Spain) Raquel Carrera
2024	Alcantarilla	Pabellón Fausto Vicent	Valencia Basket	84–60	Casademont Zaragoza	(United States) Nadia Fingall
2025	Huesca	Palacio de Deportes de Huesca	Casademont Zaragoza	79–68	Valencia Basket	(Spain) Helena Pueyo
2026	Torrejón	Pabellón Jorge Garbajosa	Valencia Basket	76–64	Innova-tsn Leganés	(Mali) Aminata Sangaré

== Titles by team ==
Team	Winners	Runners-up	Winning years
Perfumerías Avenida	9	8	2010, 2011, 2012, 2013, 2014, 2016, 2017, 2018, 2020
Ros Casares	6	1	2004, 2005, 2006, 2007, 2008, 2009
Valencia Basket	4	2	2021, 2023, 2024, 2026
Spar UniGirona	3	3	2015, 2019, 2022
UB-Barça	1	1	2005
Casademont Zaragoza	1	1	2025
Rivas Ecópolis	0	3	
Feve San José	0	1	
Palacio de Congresos de Ibiza	0	1	
IDK Gipuzkoa	0	1	
Lointek Gernika Bizkaia	0	1	
Innova-tsn Leganés	0	1	

== See also ==
- Liga Femenina
- Copa de la Reina
