= 1965 Liga Femenina de Baloncesto =

1965 Liga Femenina
- League: Liga Femenina
- Sport: Basketball
- Duration: January–April 1965
- Number of games: 46
- Number of teams: 10
- Finals champions: CREFF Madrid
- Runners-up: Indo Barcelona

Liga Femenina seasons
- ← 1964 1965–66 →

The 1965 Liga Femenina de Baloncesto was the 2nd edition of the Spanish premier women's basketball championship. It took place from 24 January to 11 April 1965. Ten teams took part in the championship and CREFF Madrid won its second title. No teams were relegated, but Indo Barcelona renounced at the end of the season. Estudiantes Vigo and Mataró Molfort's were promoted from Segunda División.

== First round ==
=== Group A ===
Pos	Team	Pld	W	L	PF	PA	PD	Pts	Qualification or relegation
1	CREFF Madrid	8	7	1	355	259	+96	15	Qualification to playoffs
2	Alhamar Granada	8	6	2	349	261	+88	14	Qualification to playoffs
3	Medina La Coruña	8	5	3	326	273	+53	13	
4	Medina Madrid	8	2	6	275	311	−36	10	
5	Medina San Sebastián	8	0	8	211	412	−201	8	

Team	MED	CRE	GRA	COR	SAN
Medina Madrid		36–41	29–30	26–38	57–29
CREFF Madrid	36–29		44–38	35–34	55–27
Alhamar Granada	51–32	48–41		42–28	67–23
Medina La Coruña	60–34	27–47	34–33		54–30
Medina San Sebastián	26–32	20–56	30–40	26–51	

Legend: Blue = left column team win; Yellow = draw; Red = top row team win.

=== Group B ===
Pos	Team	Pld	W	L	PF	PA	PD	Pts	Qualification or relegation
1	Indo Barcelona	8	8	0	364	209	+155	16	Qualification to playoffs
2	Zaragoza	8	5	3	288	329	−41	13	Qualification to playoffs
3	Picadero Damm	8	4	4	269	273	−4	12	
4	Royce-Dimar Valencia	8	2	6	242	268	−26	10	
5	Juventud Fantasit	8	1	7	229	313	−84	9	

Team	IND	ZAR	PIC	VAL	JUV
Indo Barcelona		51–21	34–16	34–23	44–30
Zaragoza	47–74		54–38	36–26	53–43
Picadero Damm	23–43	41–17		43–38	34–21
Royce-Dimar Valencia	10–33	30–31	46–41		45–19
Juventud Fantasit	39–51	26–29	20–33	31–24	

Legend: Blue = left column team win; Yellow = draw; Red = top row team win.

== Finals ==
Pos	Team	Pld	W	L	PF	PA	PD	Pts
1	CREFF Madrid	3	3	0	150	119	+31	6
2	Indo Barcelona	3	2	1	127	139	−12	5
3	Alhamar Granada	3	1	2	124	125	−1	4
4	Zaragoza	3	0	3	121	139	−18	3

=== Round 1 ===
9 April 1965

Boxscore

CREFF Madrid	60–40	Indo Barcelona
Scoring by half: 26–20, 34–20
Pts: M. Couchoud 15		Pts: Puente 18

Polideportivo, Madrid
Referees: Sánchez, Álvarez

9 April 1965

Boxscore

Alhamar Granada	47–40	Zaragoza
Scoring by half: 20–9, 27–31
Pts: L. Tamayo 12		Pts: Planas 19

Polideportivo, Madrid
Referees: Sánchez, Álvarez

=== Round 2 ===
10 April 1965

Boxscore

Indo Barcelona	47–43	Alhamar Granada
Scoring by half: 23–19, 24–24
Pts: Puentes 16		Pts: Martín 17

Polideportivo, Madrid
Referees: Sánchez, Álvarez

10 April 1965

Boxscore

CREFF Madrid	52–45	Zaragoza
Pts: T. Pérez 23		Pts: Planas 18

Polideportivo, Madrid
Referees: Sánchez, Álvarez

=== Round 3 ===
11 April 1965

Boxscore

CREFF Madrid	38–34	Alhamar Granada
Scoring by half: 19–13, 19–21
Pts: T. Pérez 13		Pts: L. Tamayo 9

Polideportivo, Madrid
Referees: Sánchez, Álvarez

11 April 1965

Boxscore

Indo Barcelona	40–36	Zaragoza
Scoring by half: 22–19, 18–17
Pts: Bové 17		Pts: Planas 15

Polideportivo, Madrid
Referees: Sánchez, Álvarez

1965 champions
CREFF Madrid
Second title
