= 1972–73 Liga Femenina de Baloncesto =

1972–73 Liga Femenina
- League: Liga Femenina
- Sport: Basketball
- Duration: 8 October 1972–25 March 1973
- Number of games: 132
- Number of teams: 12
- Finals champions: Ignis Mataró
- Runners-up: Filomatic Picadero

Liga Femenina seasons
- ← 1971–72 1973–74 →

The 1972–73 Liga Femenina de Baloncesto was the 10th edition of the Spanish premier women's basketball championship. It took place from 8 October 1972 to 25 March 1973. Twelve teams took part in the championship and Ignis Mataró won its second title. Medina Almudena was relegated, Filosofía and Standard too after losing the promotion. Águilas Schweppes renounced at the end of the season.

== Regular season ==
Pos	Team	Pld	W	D	L	PF	PA	PD	Pts	Qualification or relegation
1	Ignis Mataró	22	21	0	1	1386	843	+543	42	Champion
2	Filomatic Picadero	22	18	0	4	1104	704	+400	36	
3	Celta de Vigo	22	15	0	7	1039	1036	+3	30	
4	CREFF Girona	22	14	1	7	1018	984	+34	29	
5	Tabacalera	22	14	0	8	1042	800	+242	28	
6	CREFF Madrid	22	14	0	8	1130	956	+174	28	
7	Águilas Schweppes	22	9	0	13	939	1060	−121	18	
8	Little Kiss	22	8	0	14	910	1069	−159	16	Relegation play-off
9	Medina Madrid	22	7	0	15	953	1170	−217	14	Relegation play-off
10	Standard	22	6	1	15	912	1142	−230	13	Relegation play-off
11	Filosofía	22	5	0	17	857	1092	−235	10	Relegation play-off
12	Medina Almudena	22	0	0	22	874	1308	−434	0	Relegated

=== Results ===
Home \ Away	AGU	CEL	GIR	CRE	FIL	LIT	MAT	MEA	MEM	PIC	STA	TAB
Águilas Schweppes		33–46	42–48	46–41	49–47	38–35	41–53	55–34	54–52	27–55	60–26	33–31
Celta de Vigo	54–32		54–41	40–37	64–49	44–30	37–60	65–20	48–32	29–39	59–30	56–33
CREFF Girona	40–52	57–38		48–40	60–35	53–36	33–51	68–33	48–38	44–35	47–46	54–43
CREFF Madrid	65–41	78–34	62–21		46–24	47–46	49–65	63–43	67–44	26–54	49–46	35–34
Filosofía	42–40	44–52	47–56	41–77		38–25	43–54	56–41	38–44	25–50	53–34	30–55
Little Kiss	47–46	60–62	25–42	39–51	53–37		35–72	61–44	53–47	39–35	54–48	47–31
Ignis Mataró	88–43	78–35	66–44	65–50	76–34	51–36		74–22	59–40	53–41	71–34	51–27
Medina Almudena	50–55	60–64	46–58	57–58	39–43	36–49	33–71		49–63	32–65	41–46	39–49
Medina Madrid	48–47	36–48	37–42	39–68	74–60	59–47	34–76	56–39		36–53	38–47	30–60
Filomatic Picadero	54–22	65–34	44–31	46–38	45–23	74–28	46–48	59–28	60–20		60–28	37–32
Standard	49–48	45–53	46–46	36–42	56–48	49–38	41–69	62–49	42–45	27–51		37–46
Tabacalera	55–35	77–22	68–37	47–41	2–0	66–28	45–35	68–36	65–41	35–38	73–37	

Legend: Blue = home team win; Yellow = draw; Red = away team win.

=== Promotion ===
Team 1	Agg.	Team 2	1st leg	2nd leg
Filosofía	73–74	Hispano Francés Corberó	32–36	41–38
PEM	113–88	Standard	53–51	60–37
Medina La Coruña	63–81	Medina Madrid	28–44	35–37
Little Kiss	99–79	Medina Cádiz	71–33	28–46

1972–73 champions

Ignis Mataró
Second title
