= 1967–68 Liga Femenina de Baloncesto =

1967–68 Liga Femenina
- League: Liga Femenina
- Sport: Basketball
- Duration: November 1967–April 1968
- Number of games: 72
- Number of teams: 9
- Finals champions: CREFF Madrid
- Runners-up: Mataró Molfort's

Liga Femenina seasons
- ← 1966–67 1968–69 →

The 1967–68 Liga Femenina de Baloncesto was the 5th edition of the Spanish premier women's basketball championship. It took place from 12 November 1967 to 7 April 1968. Nine teams took part in the championship and CREFF Madrid won its fourth title. No teams were relegated due an expansion.

== Regular season ==
Pos	Team	Pld	W	L	PF	PA	PD	Pts	Qualification or relegation
1	CREFF Madrid	16	16	0	987	475	+512	32	Champion
2	Mataró Molfort's	16	11	5	760	609	+151	27	
3	Medina La Coruña	16	11	5	682	597	+85	27	
4	Dimar Valencia	16	9	7	539	651	−112	25	
5	Juventud Nerva	16	8	8	677	680	−3	24	
6	Estudiantes Vigo	16	7	9	570	668	−98	23	
7	Standard Madrid	16	5	11	484	644	−160	21	
8	Medina San Sebastián	16	3	13	608	769	−161	19	
9	Medina Madrid	16	2	14	521	735	−214	18	

Updated to match(es) played on unknown. Source:

1968 Champions
CREFF Madrid
Fourth title
