= 2011 FIBA Europe SuperCup Women =

Tournament details
- Arena: Pabellón de Wurzburg; Salamanca, Spain
- Dates: 5 October 2011

Final positions
- Champions: (Spain) Perfumerías Avenida
- Runners-up: (Israel) Elitzur Ramla

Awards and statistics
- Top scorer(s): (Spain) Marta Fernández (23 pts)

The 2011 FIBA Europe SuperCup Women was the third edition of the FIBA Europe SuperCup Women. It was held on 5 October 2011 at the Pabellón de Wurzburg in Salamanca, Spain.

== Time ==
Times are CET (UTC+1).

== Final ==
5 October 2011
20:30

Report

Perfumerías Avenida (Spain)	95–72	(Israel) Elitzur Ramla
Scoring by quarter: 26:20, 29:12, 21:25, 19:15
Pts: Marta Fernández 23; Rebs: three players 6 Asts: Marta Xargay 4		Pts: Levitsky 15; Rebs: Levitsky 7 Asts: Doron 5

Pabellón de Wurzburg, Salamanca
Attendance: 3.000
Referees: Carole Delauné (FRA), Fabiana Nitu (ROU), Jelena Tomić (CRO)

2011 FIBA Europe SuperCup Women winner

Perfumerías Avenida
1st Title
