= 1998–99 Liga Femenina de Baloncesto =

The 1998–99 Liga Femenina de Baloncesto was the 36th edition of Spain's premier championship for women's basketball clubs. It marked the competition's expansion from 12 to 14 teams. Celta de Vigo defeated CB Halcón Avenida in the play-offs' final to win its fourth title 17 years later. CD Ensino and CB Sandra Islas Canarias were the regular stage's champion and runner-up respectively, also qualifying for the championship play-offs. On the other hand, CB Navarra and Canal Isabel II CD were relegated as the two bottom teams.

== Teams by autonomous community ==
Autonomous community	Teams
(Galicia (Spain)) Galicia	3: CD Ensino, Simeón Celta, Grupo 10 Cortegada
(Community of Madrid) Madrid	3: Real Canoe, Femenino Tres Cantos, Canal Isabel II
(Castile and León) Castilla-León	2: Halcón Avenida, Ciudad de Burgos
Andalucía	1: Cajasur Linares
Asturias	1: Universidad de Oviedo
Catalunya	1: Universitari Barcelona
Comunidad Valenciana	1: Popular Godella
(Canary Islands) Islas Canarias	1: Sandra Islas Canarias
Navarra	1: CB Navarra

== Regular season ==
#	Teams	Pld	W	L	PF	PA	PS	Q/R
1	Ensino	26	22	4	1929	1605	▲6	Qualified for the play-offs
2	Sandra Islas Canarias	26	22	4	2023	1607	▲2	Qualified for the play-offs
3	Simeón Celta	26	21	5	1957	1398	▼1	Qualified for the play-offs
4	Halcón Avenida	26	19	7	2054	1817	▲2	Qualified for the play-offs
5	Real Canoe	26	18	8	1943	1707	▲6	
6	Popular Godella	26	17	9	1681	1648	▲2	
7	Cajasur Linares	26	12	14	1832	1893	New entry	
8	Universidad de Oviedo	26	11	15	1755	1814	▲1	
9	Universitari Barcelona	26	11	15	1867	1844	▼6	
10	Grupo 10 Cortegada	26	8	18	1653	1791	New entry	
11	Ciudad de Burgos	26	8	18	1568	1743	▼6	
12	Tres Cantos	26	6	20	1555	1883	Same position	
13	Navarra	26	6	20	1552	1798	▼3	Relegated to 1ª División
14	Canal Isabel II	26	1	25	1386	2207	New entry	Relegated to 1ª División

== Play-offs ==
=== Semifinals ===
Team #1	Agg.	Team #2	1st leg	2nd leg	3rd leg^{*}
Halcón Avenida	2 – 1	Ensino	94 – 81	59 – 70	78 – 71
Simeón Celta	2 – 1	Sandra Islas Canarias	87 – 50	30 – 54	64 – 60

=== Final ===
Team #1	Agg.	Team #2	1st leg	2nd leg	3rd leg^{*}
Halcón Avenida	0 – 2	Simeón Celta	58 – 69	51 – 64	

Liga Femenina de Baloncesto 1998–99 Champions
Celta Vigo
Fourth title
