= 1975–76 Segunda División de Baloncesto =

The 1975–76 Liga Nacional Segunda División de Baloncesto was the second tier of the 1975–76 Spanish basketball season.

== Regular season ==
Key to colors
| Promotion to 1ª División |
| Relegation to Tercera División |

| # | Teams | P | W | D | L | PF | PA | Pts |
|---|---|---|---|---|---|---|---|---|
| 1 | Dicoproga | 24 | 18 | 0 | 6 | 1927 | 1652 | 36 |
| 2 | Castilla Valladolid | 24 | 16 | 0 | 8 | 2101 | 1390 | 32 |
| 3 | Vallehermoso | 24 | 14 | 2 | 8 | 2160 | 1927 | 30 |
| 4 | Obradoiro | 24 | 14 | 2 | 8 | 1888 | 1818 | 30 |
| 5 | La Salle Barcelona | 24 | 14 | 0 | 10 | 2075 | 1985 | 28 |
| 6 | Granollers | 24 | 13 | 1 | 10 | 2001 | 1922 | 27 |
| 7 | Canarias | 24 | 12 | 2 | 10 | 1741 | 1765 | 26 |
| 8 | Mataró | 24 | 13 | 0 | 11 | 1994 | 1920 | 26 |
| 9 | CAU Oviedo | 24 | 10 | 1 | 13 | 1895 | 2043 | 21 |
| 10 | Castellar | 24 | 10 | 0 | 14 | 1915 | 2004 | 20 |
| 11 | Mollet | 24 | 10 | 0 | 14 | 1982 | 2052 | 20 |
| 12 | Bosco La Coruña | 24 | 6 | 0 | 18 | 1647 | 1940 | 12 |
| 13 | Manresa | 24 | 2 | 0 | 22 | 1676 | 2084 | 4 |
