= 1974–75 Segunda División de Baloncesto =

The 1974–75 Liga Nacional Segunda División de Baloncesto was the second tier of the 1974–75 Spanish basketball season.

== Regular season ==
Key to colors
| Qualify to the Championship Round |
| Will play the Segunda División next season |
| Relegation playoffs to Tercera División |
| Relegation to Tercera División |

=== Group A ===
| # | Teams | P | W | D | L | PF | PA | Pts |
|---|---|---|---|---|---|---|---|---|
| 1 | Breogán | 28 | 25 | 0 | 3 | 2530 | 1743 | 50 |
| 2 | Lugo | 28 | 21 | 0 | 7 | 2438 | 2047 | 42 |
| 3 | Vallehermoso | 28 | 20 | 0 | 8 | 2549 | 2276 | 40 |
| 4 | Obradoiro | 28 | 18 | 0 | 10 | 2203 | 1965 | 36 |
| 5 | Castilla Valladolid | 28 | 18 | 0 | 10 | 2167 | 1961 | 36 |
| 6 | Rayo | 28 | 17 | 0 | 11 | 2248 | 2131 | 34 |
| 7 | CAU Oviedo | 28 | 17 | 0 | 11 | 2320 | 2197 | 34 |
| 8 | Bosco | 28 | 16 | 0 | 12 | 2037 | 2039 | 32 |
| 9 | Don Bosco | 28 | 13 | 0 | 15 | 1985 | 2001 | 26 |
| 10 | CN Pamplona | 28 | 12 | 0 | 16 | 1949 | 2043 | 24 |
| 11 | San Viator | 28 | 9 | 0 | 19 | 1959 | 2182 | 18 |
| 12 | Vegasa | 28 | 8 | 0 | 20 | 1868 | 2207 | 16 |
| 13 | Montaña | 28 | 7 | 0 | 21 | 2128 | 2478 | 14 |
| 14 | Virgen de Atocha | 28 | 6 | 0 | 22 | 2094 | 2494 | 12 |
| 15 | Pacense | 28 | 3 | 0 | 25 | 1810 | 2614 | 6 |

=== Group B ===
| # | Teams | P | W | D | L | PF | PA | Pts |
|---|---|---|---|---|---|---|---|---|
| 1 | Granollers | 22 | 18 | 0 | 4 | 1779 | 1511 | 36 |
| 2 | La Salle Barcelona | 22 | 17 | 0 | 5 | 2006 | 1653 | 34 |
| 3 | Mollet | 22 | 14 | 0 | 6 | 1781 | 1664 | 28 |
| 4 | Marcol | 22 | 12 | 2 | 8 | 1793 | 1717 | 26 |
| 5 | Manresa | 22 | 12 | 0 | 10 | 1804 | 1740 | 24 |
| 6 | Liria | 22 | 10 | 0 | 12 | 1630 | 1707 | 20 |
| 7 | Ripollet | 22 | 10 | 0 | 12 | 1674 | 1715 | 20 |
| 8 | Helios Zaragoza | 22 | 9 | 1 | 12 | 1625 | 1726 | 19 |
| 9 | Universitario | 22 | 9 | 0 | 13 | 1719 | 1818 | 18 |
| 10 | Español | 22 | 7 | 1 | 14 | 1651 | 1844 | 15 |
| 11 | Valencia | 22 | 6 | 0 | 16 | 1695 | 1812 | 12 |
| 12 | CIDE Palma | 22 | 5 | 2 | 15 | 1625 | 1877 | 12 |

=== Group C (Canary Islands) ===
| # | Teams | P | W | D | L | PF | PA | Pts |
|---|---|---|---|---|---|---|---|---|
| 1 | Náutico | 16 | 16 | 0 | 0 | 1785 | 892 | 32 |
| 2 | Canarias | 16 | 14 | 0 | 2 | 1287 | 902 | 28 |
| 3 | Kaiser | 16 | 10 | 0 | 6 | 1207 | 1189 | 20 |
| 4 | Caja Rural | 16 | 7 | 0 | 9 | 996 | 996 | 14 |
| 5 | Caja Insular | 16 | 7 | 0 | 9 | 970 | 1160 | 14 |
| 6 | Juventud C. | 16 | 6 | 0 | 10 | 909 | 1103 | 12 |
| 7 | Claret | 16 | 5 | 1 | 10 | 1055 | 1263 | 11 |
| 8 | La Palma | 16 | 4 | 0 | 12 | 746 | 1063 | 8 |
| 9 | Hércules Icod | 16 | 2 | 1 | 13 | 797 | 1204 | 5 |
| 10 | Salesianos | Retired before the competition | | | | | | |

== Championship round ==
Key to colors
| Promotion to 1ª División |
| Qualify to Playoffs |

| # | Teams | P | W | D | L | PF | PA | Pts |
|---|---|---|---|---|---|---|---|---|
| 1 | Breogán | 4 | 4 | 0 | 0 | 352 | 273 | 8 |
| 2 | Granollers | 4 | 2 | 0 | 2 | 266 | 282 | 4 |
| 3 | Náutico | 4 | 2 | 0 | 2 | 311 | 321 | 4 |
| 4 | La Salle | 4 | 1 | 0 | 3 | 322 | 329 | 2 |
| 5 | Lugo | 4 | 1 | 0 | 3 | 309 | 354 | 2 |

== Promotion/relegation playoffs ==
=== Granollers vs Pineda ===
- Granollers 65-64 Pineda
- Pineda 77-66 Granollers

=== Náutico vs Águilas ===
- Náutico 88-69 Águilas
- Águilas 97-76 Náutico
