= 1976–77 Segunda División de Baloncesto =

The 1976–77 Liga Nacional Segunda División de Baloncesto was the second tier of the 1976–77 Spanish basketball season.

== Regular season ==
Key to colors
Promotion to 1ª División
Relegation to Tercera División

#	Teams	P	W	D	L	PF	PA	Pts
1	Mataró	28	20	0	8	2646	2353	40
2	Granollers	28	19	1	8	2603	2377	39
3	Águilas de Bilbao	28	17	0	11	2587	2396	34
4	Caja Rural Canarias	28	16	1	11	2154	2045	33
5	Vallehermoso	28	15	1	12	2673	2530	31
6	CN Helios Zaragoza	28	15	0	13	2610	2584	30
7	RC Náutico Tenerife	28	14	1	13	2349	2359	29
8	Obradoiro	28	13	0	15	2365	2400	26
9	Mollet	28	12	0	16	2489	2482	24
10	CAU Rivayagüe de Oviedo	28	12	0	16	2394	2510	24
11	Bosco La Coruña	28	12	0	16	2302	2424	24
12	La Salle Barcelona	28	12	0	16	2337	2391	24
13	Miraflores Los Angeles de Málaga	28	12	0	16	2429	2676	24
14	Hortibel Liria	28	11	0	17	2221	2487	22
15	Castellar	28	8	0	20	2360	2504	16
