= 1983 Copa del Rey de Baloncesto =

The 1983 Copa del Rey was the 47th edition of the Spanish basketball Cup. It was the last edition organized by the Spanish Basketball Federation and its final was played in Palencia.

The competition was played after the end of the 1982–83 Liga Nacional.

== Round of 16 ==
Teams #2 played the second leg at home. Real Madrid and FC Barcelona received a bye to the quarterfinals.

Team 1	Agg.	Team 2	1st leg	2nd leg
Obradoiro	158–185	OAR Fondomar	74–91	84–94
CAI Zaragoza	170–177	Joventut Massana	92–93	78–84
Estudiantes	151–183	Cotonificio	69–87	82–96
Manresa EB	158–177	Areslux Granollers	81–82	77–95
Caja de Ronda	151–149	Basconia	73–68	78–81
Miñón Valladolid	206–219	Inmobanco	111–125	95–94

== Quarterfinals ==
Team 1	Agg.	Team 2	1st leg	2nd leg
FC Barcelona	191–174	OAR Fondomar	94–80	97–94
Real Madrid	228–191	Joventut Massana	110–84	108–107
Cotonificio	154–144	Areslux Granollers	79–75	75–69
Caja de Ronda	148–179	Inmobanco	80–87	68–92

== Semifinals ==
Team 1	Agg.	Team 2	1st leg	2nd leg
FC Barcelona	w.o.	Real Madrid		
Inmobanco	161–155	Cotonificio	81–80	80–73

== Final ==
FC Barcelona won its 13th title after beating Real Madrid 2-1 in the final CB Inmobanco. Previously, Real Madrid boycotted the semifinal against Barcelona due to the non-signature of the creation of the ACB by the Catalans.

As Barcelona won the Liga Nacional, Inmobanco qualified to the Cup Winners' Cup as runner-up, but finally was dissolved before the start of the next season.

28 April 1983
19:00 GTM+1

Boxscore

FC Barcelona	125–93	Inmobanco
Scoring by half: 62-41, 63-52
Pts: Epi 30		Pts: Morales 28

Pabellón Municipal de Deportes, Palencia
Attendance: 4,000
Referees: Antonio Ballesteros, Sebastián Ollero

1983 Copa del Rey Champions

FC Barcelona
13th title
