= CB Canarias =

La Laguna Tenerife
- Leagues: Liga ACB; EuroCup
- Founded: 1939; 87 years ago (1994; 32 years ago)
- History: CB Canarias (1939–1994); CB 1939 Canarias (1994–present)
- Arena: Santiago Martín
- Capacity: 5,100
- Location: La Laguna, Tenerife, Spain
- Team colors: Gold, Black
- President: Aniano Cabrera
- Head coach: Jaka Lakovič
- Championships: 2 Champions League; 3 Intercontinental Cup
- Website: Official website
Home	Away

Club Cantera Base 1939 Canarias S.A.D., commonly known as CB Canarias, also known as La Laguna Tenerife for sponsorship reasons, is a professional basketball team based in La Laguna, Tenerife, Spain. Domestically, the team plays in the top-level league in Spain, the Liga ACB and in European-wide competitions, the team plays in the EuroCup. Their home arena is the Santiago Martín.

Canarias became a prominent club on the domestic scene during the 2010s, after securing promotion to the Liga ACB in 2014. Under the FIBA system, Canarias won two BCL championships (in 2017 and 2023) as well as three Intercontinental Cups (2017, 2020, 2023).

== History ==
The team was founded in 1994, after the old CB Canarias club, that huge financial problems at that time, merged with other teams of the Spanish island of Tenerife, to create the new Tenerife Canarias club, which only played two seasons in the Liga EBA competition, at the time when that league was the second tier level of Spanish club basketball.

People who were in disagreement with that merger then created the new CB 1939 Canarias club, which inherited the colors and the logo of the club. In 2012, Iberostar Canarias was promoted to Spain's top-tier level Liga ACB competition, after the team won the championship of the LEB Oro. However, the club couldn't actually promote, due to the club's inability to fulfill the requirements needed to join the league that are requested by the league's organizer, the ACB. One month later, on 20 July 2012, CB 1939 Canarias finally achieved the league promotion, after Lucentum Alicante's vacated place in the league was granted to CB 1939 Canarias.

Alejandro Martínez, became the team's head coach in 2003, and he managed to lead the team to multiple league promotions, going up from the LEB Plata (Spanish third tier), to the top-tier level Liga ACB. He resigned from the team's head coaching position in 2015.

=== Golden era and international championships ===
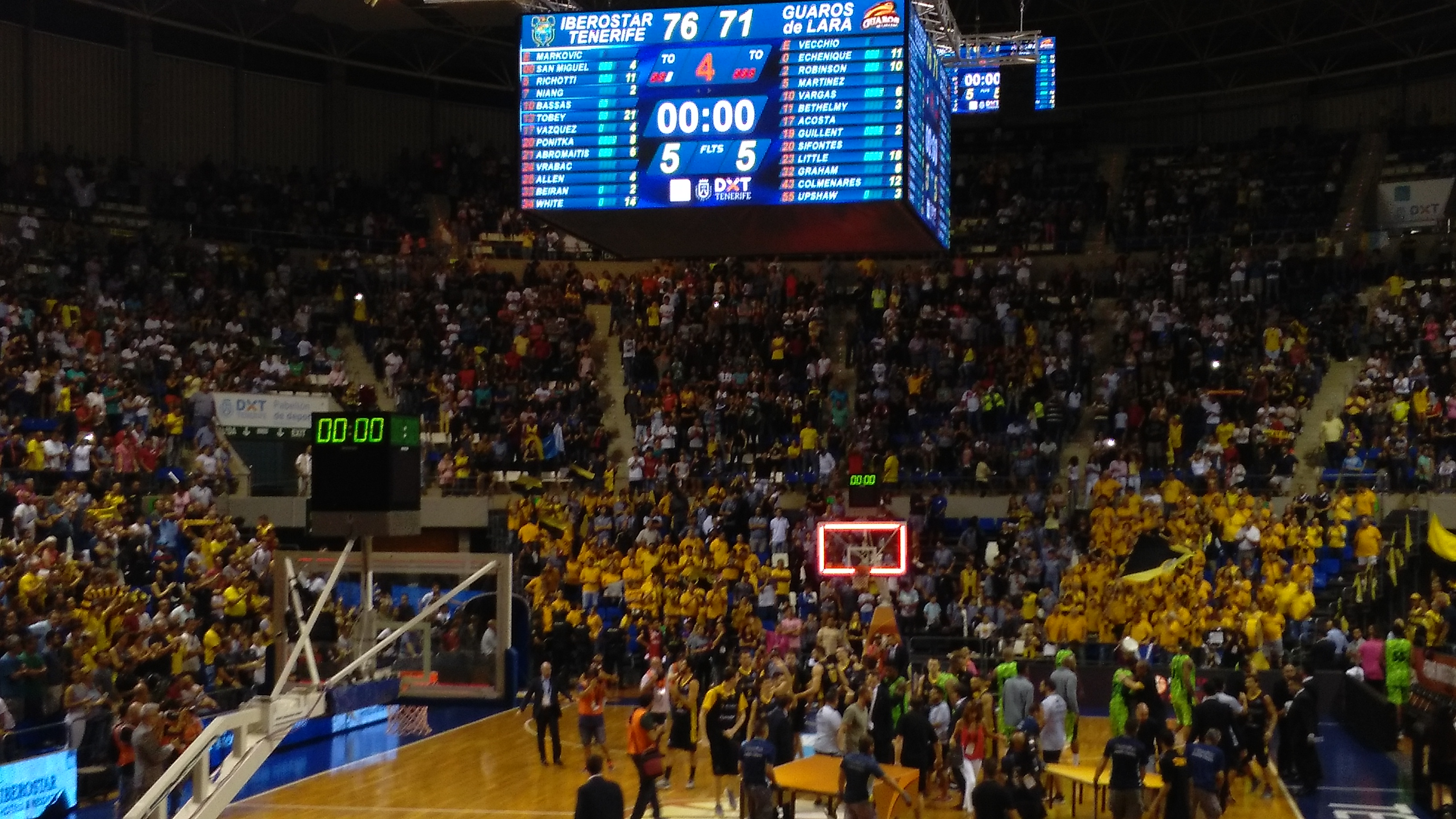
Canarias celebrating winning the 2017 FIBA Intercontinental Cup

In the 2016–17 season, Canarias returned to the European scene after 28 years. On 29 March 2017, Canarias qualified for the 2017 Final Four of FIBA's Basketball Champions League (BCL), which happened 36 years after the club's first league promotion up to Spain's previous top-level competition, the Liga Nacional, in 1981. The 2017 Champions League Final Four was played at Canaria's home arena, the Pabellón Insular Santiago Martín. Canarias won the BCL championship, after beating the Turkish Super League club Banvit in the Final. The championship marked the first major title in the club's history.

On 24 September 2017, Canarias participated in the 2017 FIBA Intercontinental Cup, as the defending champions of the Basketball Champions League. The club won the FIBA Intercontinental Cup title, after beating the defending champions of the FIBA Americas League, the Venezuelan club Guaros de Lara, by a score of 76–71. Three years later, Canarias also won the 2020 FIBA Intercontinental Cup title, after they defeated the defending champions of the Basketball Champions League, the Italian club Virtus Bologna, by a score of 80–72.

In March 2020, the club stopped the 2019–20 season due to the COVID-19 pandemic in Spain. The following season, the 2020–21 season, was the most successful season in the ACB in the team's history. After finishing third in the regular season, Canarias beat San Pablo Burgos before being eliminated in the semi-finals by Barcelona. In the 2021–22 season, Canarias won their second BCL championship after defeating fellow Spanish team Manresa in the final in Bilbao.

== Sponsorship naming ==
Partly due to sponsorship reasons, the team has been known by several names over the years:

- Universidad Canarias Pepsi (1970–1975)
- Caja Rural Canarias (1975–1980)
- Cofisa Canarias (1982–1984)
- Lucky Canarias (1984–1985)
- CajaCanarias (1985–1991)
- AutoLaca Canarias (1995–1996)
- Bodegón Juanito Canarias (1996–1998)
- Canarias Yamaha (1998–1999)
- Ciudad de La Laguna (1999–2001)
- Organización Socas Canarias (2001–2010)
- Isla de Tenerife Canarias (2010–2011)
- Iberostar Canarias (2011–2012)
- Iberostar Tenerife (2013–2021)
- Lenovo Tenerife (2021–2024)
- La Laguna Tenerife (2024–present)

== Home arena ==
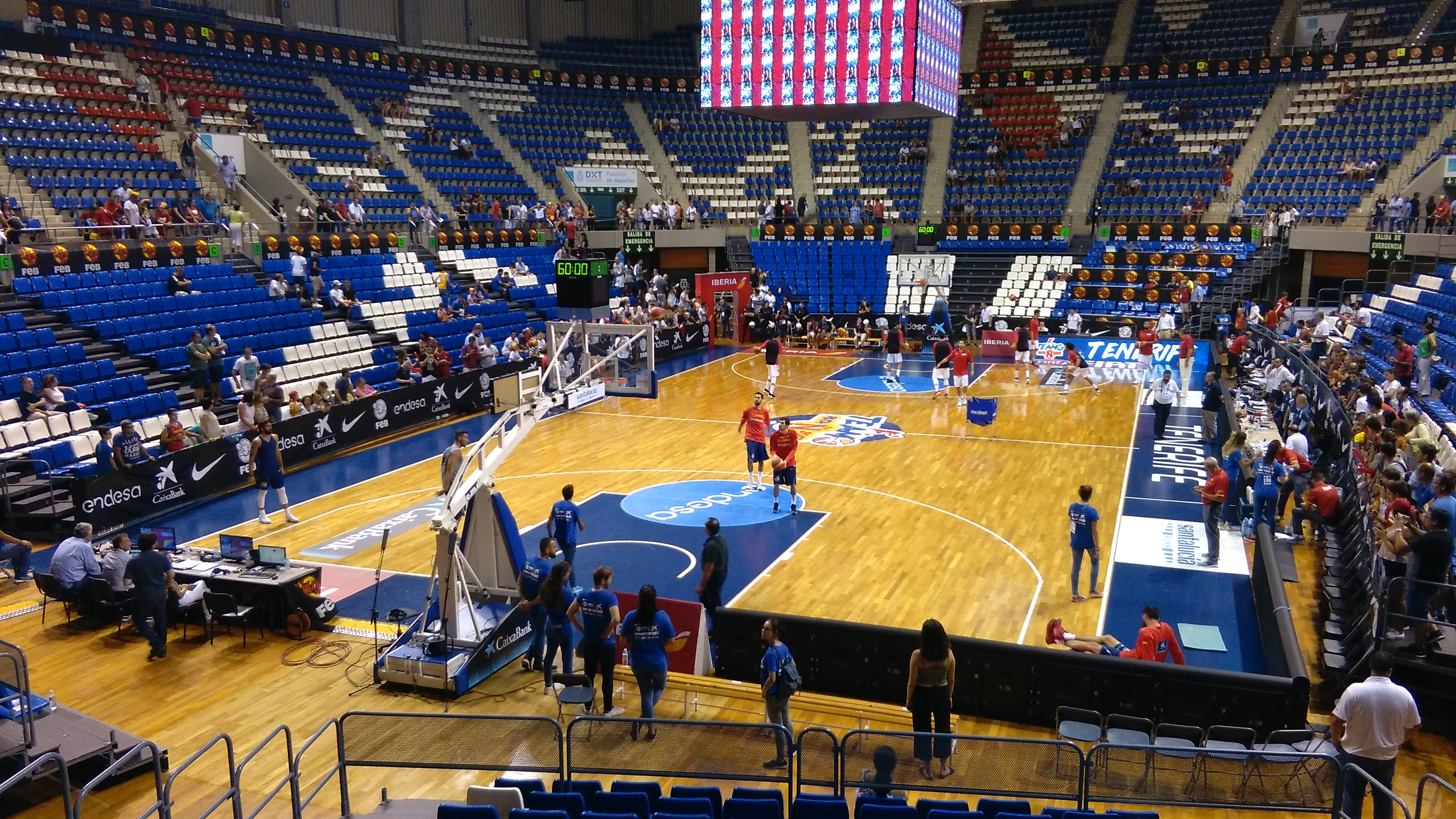
The Pabellón Insular Santiago Martín, the club's home arena.

CB Canarias 1939 plays its home games at the Pabellón Insular Santiago Martín arena, which is located in San Cristóbal de La Laguna, on the Spanish island of Tenerife. The arena was opened in 1999, and it has a seating capacity of 5,100 people for basketball games. CB Canarias 1939 has used Pabellón Insular Santiago Martín as its home arena, since 2010.

It has hosted major sporting events, such as the 2017 Basketball Champions League Final Four, the 2017 FIBA Intercontinental Cup, the 2018 FIBA Women's World Cup, and the 2020 FIBA Intercontinental Cup.

== Players ==
=== Current roster ===
Note: Flags indicate national team eligibility at FIBA-sanctioned events. Players may hold other non-FIBA nationalities not displayed.

La Laguna Tenerife roster
Players
Coaches

Pos.	No.	Nat.	Name	Ht.	Wt.	Age
G/F	1	(United States) (Senegal)	Bamba, TJ	1.96 m (6 ft 5 in)	98 kg (216 lb)	25 – 6 January 2001
G	2	(United States)	Guy, Kyle	1.85 m (6 ft 1 in)	76 kg (168 lb)	29 – 11 August 1997
G	3	(Spain)	Fernández, Jaime	1.86 m (6 ft 1 in)	79 kg (174 lb)	33 – 4 June 1993
G/F	4	(United States) (Azerbaijan)	Van Beck, Wesley	1.93 m (6 ft 4 in)	88 kg (194 lb)	30 – 22 January 1996
G	6	(Uruguay) (Italy)	Fitipaldo, Bruno	1.83 m (6 ft 0 in)	85 kg (187 lb)	35 – 2 August 1991
SF	7	(Spain)	López-Arostegui, Xabier	2.00 m (6 ft 7 in)	97 kg (214 lb)	29 – 19 May 1997
SF	17	(Spain)	Segui, Jaume (Y)	1.96 m (6 ft 5 in)	75 kg (165 lb)	18 – 16 April 2008
C	19	(Georgia (country))	Shermadini, Giorgi	2.17 m (7 ft 1 in)	120 kg (265 lb)	37 – 2 April 1989
PF	21	(United States) (Lithuania)	Abromaitis, Tim	2.03 m (6 ft 8 in)	107 kg (236 lb)	37 – 17 September 1989
F/C	22	(United States) (North Macedonia)	Happ, Ethan	2.08 m (6 ft 10 in)	108 kg (238 lb)	30 – 7 May 1996
C	24	(Mali)	Sangare, Mohamed (Y)	2.03 m (6 ft 8 in)	91 kg (201 lb)	19 – 2 April 2007
SF	31	(Lithuania)	Giedraitis, Rokas (injured)	2.01 m (6 ft 7 in)	88 kg (194 lb)	34 – 16 August 1992
F/C	32	(United States)	Hunter, Vince	2.03 m (6 ft 8 in)	101 kg (223 lb)	32 – 5 August 1994
F	33	(Spain)	Alderete, Héctor	2.03 m (6 ft 8 in)	92 kg (203 lb)	24 – 6 March 2002
F	42	(Netherlands) (Canada)	Doornekamp, Aaron (C)	2.01 m (6 ft 7 in)	96 kg (212 lb)	40 – 5 December 1985
G	47	(Latvia)	Kurucs, Artūrs	1.93 m (6 ft 4 in)	87 kg (192 lb)	26 – 19 January 2000

Head coach

- (Basketball Federation of Slovenia) Jaka Lakovič

Assistant coach(es)

- (Spanish Basketball Federation) Nacho Yáñez
- (Argentine Basketball Confederation) Juan Manuel Gatti
- (Spanish Basketball Federation) Albert Oliver

Legend

- (C) Team captain
- Injured

- Roster
- Transactions
Updated: November 11, 2026

=== Depth chart ===
Pos.	Starting 5	Bench 1	Bench 2	Bench 3	Inactive
C	Vince Hunter *	Giorgi Shermadini °	Mohamed Sangare ‡	Ethan Happ °
PF	Aaron Doornekamp °	Tim Abromaitis °
SF	Wesley Van Beck °	Xabier López-Arostegui †	Héctor Alderete †	Jaume Segui ‡	Rokas Giedraitis ° (injured)
SG	Kyle Guy *	Artūrs Kurucs †		TJ Bamba ^
PG	Jaime Fernández †	Bruno Fitipaldo °

Notes: Blue † – homegrown player; (Note: A homegrown player is a player that played for at least three years before the age of 20 on a Spanish team. In Liga ACB, the team must register at least four homegrown players in rosters of 10–12 players or at least three homegrown players in rosters of 8–9 players. In EuroCup, the team did not have any limitations regarding the number of homegrown players.) Red * – overseas player; (Note: An overseas player is a player from outside EEA, FIBA Europe or ACP states. In Liga ACB, the team may register at most two overseas players. In EuroCup, the team did not have any limitations regarding the number of overseas players.) Purple °; – community player (Note: Comunitarios (loosely translated as "Community players") refers to any player who holds a passport from a country within the European Union (EU), the European Economic Area (EEA), or an associated nation with specific treaties. In Liga ACB, if a European player signs with a Spanish team, they are registered as a Comunitario. Teams can theoretically sign an unlimited number of these players, provided they still satisfy the mandatory homegrown quota (cupos).) Gold ^; – cotonou status player (Note: Cotonou status is a massive roster loophole in European basketball. It allows players from 78 African, Caribbean, and Pacific (ACP) countries to be treated exactly like EU citizens (Comunitarios) for employment purposes. In Liga ACB, a player with a passport from a Cotonou country does not count toward the maximum limit of 2 non-EU imports.) Green ‡ – youth player (Note: In Liga ACB, the team may register under-22 players linked to the youth system. In EuroCup, the team may register under-20 players linked to the youth system.)

== Head coaches ==
- Alejandro Martínez: 2003–2015
- Txus Vidorreta: 2015–2017, 2018–2026
- Nenad Marković: 2017
- Fotios Katsikaris: 2017–2018
- Jaka Lakovič: 2026–present

== Season by season ==
Season	Tier	Division	Pos.	W–L	Copa del Rey	Other cups		European competitions		
CB Canarias
1974–75	2	2ª División	2nd	14–2						
1975–76	2	2ª División	7th	12–2–10						
1976–77	2	2ª División	4th	16–1–11						
1977–78	2	2ª División	8th	14–2–14				3 Korać Cup	R1	0–2
1978–79	2	1ª División B	5th	12–10						
1979–80	2	1ª División B	6th	21–1–8						
1980–81	2	1ª División B	3rd	16–1–9						
1981–82	1	1ª División	12th	4–2–20	Round of 16					
1982–83	2	1ª División B	3rd	20–1–5						
1983–84	1	Liga ACB	11th	12–18						
1984–85	2	Liga ACB	15th	10–18						
1985–86	2	1ª División B	1st	24–4						
1986–87	1	Liga ACB	6th	15–18	Quarterfinalist	Copa Príncipe	R16			
1987–88	1	Liga ACB	6th	15–18	Quarterfinalist	Copa Príncipe	QF			
1988–89	1	Liga ACB	19th	12–29	Round of 16			3 Korać Cup	R2	3–1
1989–90	1	Liga ACB	16th	12–19	First round					
1990–91	1	Liga ACB	24th	10–26	Second round					
1991–92	2	1ª División	5th	22–22						
1992–93	2	1ª División	5th	20–20						
1993–94	2	1ª División	3rd	27–11						
CB 1939 Canarias
1994–95	4	2ª División	5th	5–7						
1995–96	4	2ª División	3rd	22–7						
1996–97	4	2ª División	3rd	16–6						
1997–98	4	2ª División	1st	23–4						
1998–99	3	Liga EBA	4th	19–11						
1999–00	3	Liga EBA	3rd	17–9						
2000–01	4	Liga EBA	1st	24–7						
2001–02	4	Liga EBA	1st	33–4						
2002–03	3	LEB 2	10th	13–17						
2003–04	3	LEB 2	13th	11–19						
2004–05	3	LEB 2	4th	22–16						
2005–06	3	LEB 2	14th	13–21						
2006–07	3	LEB 2	2nd	35–8		Copa LEB 2	RU			
2007–08	2	LEB Oro	7th	17–19						
2008–09	2	LEB Oro	13th	15–19						
2009–10	2	LEB Oro	5th	26–16						
2010–11	2	LEB Oro	7th	20–19						
2011–12	2	LEB Oro	1st (Note: Initially, resigned to promote to Liga ACB but later achieved the vacant berth of CB Lucentum Alicante.)	26–8		Copa Príncipe	C			
2012–13	1	Liga ACB	10th	17–17						
2013–14	1	Liga ACB	11th	14–21	Quarterfinalist					
2014–15	1	Liga ACB	11th	16–18						
2015–16	1	Liga ACB	9th	16–18						
2016–17	1	Liga ACB	5th	23–12	Quarterfinalist			3 Champions League	C	15–1–4
2017–18	1	Liga ACB	8th	19–17	Semifinalist	Intercontinental Cup	C	3 Champions League	R16	13–3
2018–19	1	Liga ACB	9th	17–17	Semifinalist			3 Champions League	RU	15–5
2019–20	1	Liga ACB	7th	16–11	Quarterfinalist	Intercontinental Cup	C	3 Champions League	QF	13–5
2020–21	1	Liga ACB	3rd	30–11	Semifinalist	Supercopa	SF	3 Champions League	QF	9–4
2021–22	1	Liga ACB	6th	22–15	Semifinalist	Supercopa	SF	3 Champions League	C	16–3
2022–23	1	Liga ACB	6th	24–12	Runner-up	Intercontinental Cup	C	3 Champions League	3rd	12–5
2023–24	1	Liga ACB	6th	21–15	Semifinalist			3 Champions League	RU	11–6
2024–25	1	Liga ACB	3rd	27–12	Semifinalist			3 Champions League	4th	14–2
2025–26	1	Liga ACB	4th	20–20	Quarterfinalist	Supercopa	SF	3 Champions League	4th	10–7

== Honours and awards ==
=== Honours ===
==== National competitions ====
LEB Oro

- Champions (1): 2011–12

Copa Príncipe de Asturias:

- Champions (1): 2012

Trofeo Gobierno de Canarias

- Champions (2): 2009, 2011

==== International competitions ====
Basketball Champions League

- Champions (2): 2016–17, 2021–22
  - Runners-up (2): 2018–19, 2023–24
  - Third place (1): 2022–23

FIBA Intercontinental Cup

- Champions (3): 2017, 2020, 2023

==== Friendly competitions ====
- Las Palmas, Spain Invitational Game
  - 2018

=== Individual awards ===
Liga ACB MVP

- Giorgi Shermadini – 2021
- Marcelinho Huertas – 2025

All-Liga ACB First Team

- Giorgi Shermadini – 2020, 2021, 2022
- Marcelinho Huertas – 2021, 2022

All-Liga ACB Second Team

- Marcelinho Huertas – 2020
- Javier Beirán – 2019

LEB Oro MVP

- Jakim Donaldson – 2009, 2010
- Ricardo Guillén – 2011

All LEB Oro First Team

- Ricardo Guillén – 2011
