= CB Inmobanco =

- Dissolved: 1983
- History: Castilla-Vallehermoso (–1978); CB Tempus (1978–1979); CB Inmobanco (1980–1983)
- Location: Community of Madrid

Club Baloncesto Inmobanco, also known as Club Baloncesto Tempus, was a professional basketball club based in Madrid.

== History ==
CB Inmobanco was founded as the reserve team of Real Madrid with the name of Castilla-Vallehermoso. The club separated from Real on 1978, after promoting to the first division. It played two Copa del Rey finals and the Korać Cup in the 1980–81 season. During its history, it played in several arenas of Pozuelo de Alarcón and Madrid.

Finally, the club disappeared in 1983 after not having a sponsor to complete the budget for the next season. It was going to play Cup Winners' Cup.

== Season by season ==
Season	Tier	Division	Pos.	W–L	Copa del Rey	European competitions		
1974–75	2	2ª División						
1975–76	2	2ª División	3rd	14–2–8				
1976–77	2	2ª División	5th	15–1–12				
1977–78	2	2ª División	2nd	22–1–7				
1978–79	1	1ª División	11th	9–13	Runner-up			
1979–80	1	1ª División	8th	8–3–11	Semifinalist			
1980–81	1	1ª División	13th	7–19	First round	3 Korać Cup	R2	1–3
1981–82	2	1ª División B	1st	24–2				
1982–83	1	1ª División	5th	16–10	Runner-up			

== Notable players ==
- (Spain) José Manuel Beirán
- (Spain) Fernando Romay
- (Spain) José Luis "Indio" Díaz
