= 1977–78 Segunda División de Baloncesto =

The 1977–78 Liga Nacional Segunda División de Baloncesto was the second tier of the 1977–78 Spanish basketball season.

== Regular season ==
Key to colors
Promotion to 1ª División
Relegation to Tercera División

#	Teams	P	W	D	L	Pts
1	Mollet	30	23	0	7	46
2	Tempus Castilla	30	22	1	7	45
3	Valladolid	30	19	3	8	41
4	Helios	30	18	1	11	37
5	Echevarria	30	17	1	12	35
6	CAU Rivayagüe Oviedo	30	17	1	12	35
7	Basket Badalona	30	16	0	14	32
8	Caja Rural Canarias	30	14	2	14	30
9	Bosco La Coruña	30	13	2	15	28
10	Breogán	30	14	0	16	28
11	La Salle Barcelona	30	13	1	16	27
12	RC Náutico Tenerife	30	12	1	17	25
13	Aguilas Bilbao	30	11	1	18	23
14	Obradoiro	30	8	2	20	18
15	Universitario Valladolid	30	9	0	21	16
16	Constancia	30	6	0	24	9 *

- 3 pts deducted
