= 1982–83 Liga Española de Baloncesto =

1982–83 Liga Nacional de Baloncesto
- League: Liga Nacional
- Sport: Basketball
- Teams: 14
- TV partner: Televisión Española

Regular Season
- Season champions: FC Barcelona
- Top scorer: (United States) Claude Gregory (BAS)

ACB seasons
- ← 1981–82 1983–84 →

The 1982–83 season was the 27th season of the Liga Española de Baloncesto. FC Barcelona won their title.

== Teams and venues ==
Team	Home city
FC Barcelona	Barcelona
Real Madrid CF	Madrid
CB Areslux Granollers	Granollers
CB CAI Zaragoza	Zaragoza
CB Inmobanco	Madrid
CB Miñón Valladolid	Valladolid
Club Joventut	Badalona
CB Cotonificio	Badalona
Manresa EB	Manresa
CB Estudiantes	Madrid
CB OAR Ferrol	Ferrol
CB Caja de Ronda	Málaga
CD Basconia	Vitoria
Obradoiro CAB	Santiago de Compostela

== Team Standings ==
Pos	Team	Pld	W	D	L	PF	PA	Pts	Qualification or relegation
1	Real Madrid CF ^{1}	26	25	0	1	2.798	2.167	50	Title game
1	FC Barcelona ^{1}	26	25	0	1	2.822	2.217	50	Title game
3	Areslux Granollers	26	17	2	7	2.394	2.195	36	
4	CAI Zaragoza	26	16	1	9	2.191	2.130	33	
5	CB Inmobanco ^{2}	26	16	0	10	2.279	2.173	32	
6	Miñón Valladolid	26	15	0	11	2.512	2.514	30	
7	Club Joventut de Badalona	26	14	1	11	2.394	2.434	29	
8	CB Cotonificio	26	13	0	13	2.228	2.261	26	
9	Manresa EB	26	10	0	16	2.156	2.348	20	
10	CB Estudiantes	26	8	1	17	2.202	2.410	17	
11	CB OAR Ferrol	26	7	2	17	2.201	2.241	16	
12	CB Caja de Ronda	26	6	0	20	2.040	2.285	12	
13	CD Basconia	26	3	3	20	2.177	2.448	9	
14	Obradoiro CAB ^{3}	26	2	0	23	1.895	2.466	3	Relegation to Primera División B

== Title game ==
The title game was played at the Palacio de Deportes in Oviedo.

Team 1	Score	Team 2
Barcelona	76–70	Real Madrid

1983 Champion
FC Barcelona

== Stats Leaders ==
=== Points ===
Rank	Name	Team	Points	Games	PPG
1.	Claude Gregory	BAS	766	25	30,6
2.	Nate Davis	OBR	321	12	26,8
3.	John Stroud	CRO	691	26	26,6
4.	Chicho Sibilio	BAR	674	26	25,9
5.	Walter Jordan	VAL	665	26	25,6
6.	Fernando Martín	RMD	600	25	24,0
7.	Malcolm Cesare	OAR	593	26	22,8
8.	Samuel Puente	VAL	578	26	22,2
9.	José Luis “Indio” Díaz	INM	552	26	21,2
10.	Juan Antonio San Epifanio “Epi”	BAR	549	26	21,1

== Notes ==
1. The title was decided in a game between Barcelona and Real Madrid.
2. Inmobanco was dissolved at the end of the season.
3. Obradoiro was docked 1 point.
