= Indio Díaz =

Spanish basketball player (born 1957)

José Luis Díaz Vázquez (born 31 March 1957 in Maracaibo, Venezuela), known as Indio Díaz, is a Spanish retired basketball player. He played 18 times with the Spain national team.

== Clubs ==
- 1978-80: CB Tempus
- 1980-83: Real Madrid
- 1983-89: CB Zaragoza
- 1989-93: Valencia BC

== Awards ==
- Intercontinental Cup (1): 1981
- Liga Nacional (1): 1981-82
- Copa del Rey (1): 1983-84
