= Marta Fernández (basketball) =

Spanish basketball player (born 1981)

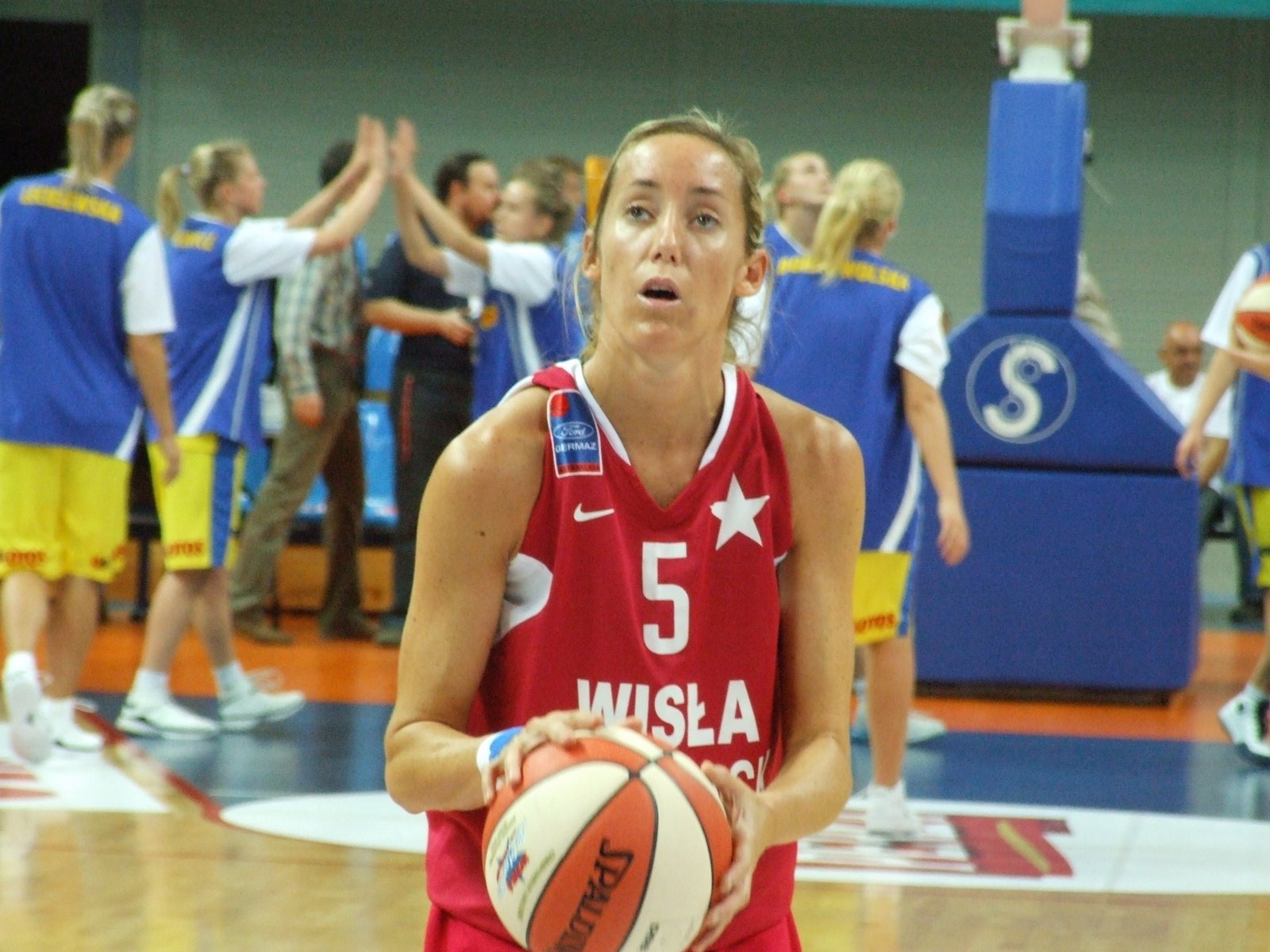

Personal information
- Born: 21 December 1981 (age 44) Barcelona, Spain
- Listed height: 180 cm (5 ft 11 in)

Career information
- Playing career: 1995–2015
- Position: Shooting guard

Career history
- 1999-2004: Popular Godella / Ros Casares
- 2001-2002: → Torrent (loan)
- 2004-2007: Universitari Barcelona
- 2007: Los Angeles Sparks
- 2007-2010: Wisła Can-Pack Kraków
- 2010-2011: Ros Casares Valencia
- 2011-2015: CB Avenida

Career highlights
- 5× Spanish League champion (2001, 2002, 2004, 2005, 2013); 6× Spanish Cup champion (2002, 2003, 2004, 2012, 2014, 2015); 2× Spanish League MVP (2006, 2007); Polish League champion (2008); Polish Cup Champion (2009)
- Stats at Basketball Reference
Medals
Women's basketball
Representing Spain
World Championships
Bronze medal – third place	2010 Czech Republic
European Championships
Bronze medal – third place	2003 Greece
Bronze medal – third place	2005 Turkey

Marta Fernández Farrés (born 21 December 1981 in Barcelona) is a Spanish retired women's basketball player. A 1.80 m (5 ft 11 in) guard, she won three bronze medals with the Spain women's national basketball team. At club level, she played in 2007 with the Los Angeles Sparks of the United States' WNBA., the Polish team Wisła Can-Pack Kraków and the Spanish teams Universitari Barcelona, Ros Casares Valencia and Perfumerías Avenida, where she retired in 2015. Marta Fernández is the sister of former Spanish international and Real Madrid shooting guard Rudy Fernández.

== Club career ==
Fernández spent her formative years at Segle XXI, where young prospects are recruited. She played for them in the Spanish top-tier league with Popular Godella / Ros Casares (1999–2004, 2010–11), Universitari Barcelona (2004–07) and CB Avenida (2011–2015), winning a total of five leagues and six domestic cups. She was the 2007 and 2008 MVP of the Spanish League.

She spent the summer of 2007 at the Los Angeles Sparks and the 2007–2010 seasons with Wisła Can-Pack Kraków.

=== EuroLeague stats ===
Source: FIBA

Season	Team	GP	MPP	PPP	RPP	APP
2001-02	(Spain) Popular Godella	15	25.1	11.3	3.1	0.9
2002-03	(Spain) Ros Casares	14	27.1	10.2	3.3	1.9
2003-04	(Spain) Ros Casares	14	24.5	9.4	1.6	1.9
2007-08	(Poland) Wisła Can-Pack Kraków	12	28.2	12.8	1.9	1.8
2008-09	(Poland) Wisła Can-Pack Kraków	13	32.5	10.9	2.2	2.6
2009-10	(Poland) Wisła Can-Pack Kraków	18	33.7	13.4	3.2	3.7
2010-11	(Spain) Ros Casares Valencia	17	20.7	9.2	1.6	1.9
2011-12	(Spain) Perfumerías Avenida	14	25.8	10.6	1.5	2.4
2012-13	(Spain) Perfumerías Avenida	14	30.3	13.1	1.4	2.6
2013-14	(Spain) Perfumerías Avenida	14	20.3	6.4	1.4	1.5
2014-15	(Spain) Perfumerías Avenida	16	26.3	9.5	1.4	2.2
Total		161	26.7	10.6	2.0	2.1

== National team ==
She made her debut with Spain women's national basketball team at the age of 18. She played with the senior team from 2000 to 2012. She is one of the most capped players with a total of 120 caps and 8.2 PPG. She participated in the (Athens 2004 Olympics, three World Championships and two European Championships:

- 5th 1997 FIBA Europe Under-16 Championship (youth)
- 998 FIBA Europe Under-18 Championship (youth)
- 5th 2000 FIBA Europe Under-20 Championship (youth)
- 5th 2002 World Championship
- 2003 Eurobasket
- 6th 2004 Summer Olympics
- 2005 Eurobasket
- 8th 2006 World Championship
- 2010 World Championship
