= Liga Femenina de Baloncesto =

Liga Femenina Endesa
- Founded: 1964; 62 years ago
- First season: 1964
- Country: Spain
- Confederation: FIBA Europe
- Number of teams: 16
- Level on pyramid: 1
- Relegation to: LF Challenge
- Domestic cup: Copa de la Reina
- Supercup: Supercopa de España
- International cup(s): EuroLeague; EuroCup
- Current champions: Valencia Basket (4th title) (2025–26)
- Most championships: Pool Getafe; Ros Casares; Perfumerías Avenida (8 titles)
- TV partners: Teledeporte
- Website: ligafemenina.es
- 2025–26 season

The Liga Femenina de Baloncesto, also known as Liga Femenina Endesa for sponsorship reasons, is the highest level of league competition for women's basketball in Spain. It is the women's equivalent of the men's Liga ACB and is run by the Spanish Basketball Federation. The league was founded in 1964 and is played under FIBA rules.

Throughout its history 13 clubs have been champions; CB Godella-Pool Getafe (with both names), Ros Casares and Perfumerías Avenida have won the most championships, with eight.

== Liga championship rules ==
Each team has to play all the other teams in its division twice, once at home and once away. This means that in Liga Femenina de Baloncesto the league's regular season ends after all teams play 26 matches.

At the end of the league, the eight best teams in the standings start a play-off, pitting the first place team in the standings versus the 8th place team in the standings, and so on. There are three playoff rounds, each consisting of three-game series, and the winner of the finals round becomes the champion of the Liga Femenina de Baloncesto. This is similar to the NBA playoffs system, but shorter.

Each season, the two last qualified teams of the regular season are relegated to Liga Femenina 2 de Baloncesto and replaced by the two first qualified teams of this league.

== Current clubs ==
Location of teams in 2024–25 Liga Femenina
Location of teams from the Canary Islands in 2024–25 Liga Femenina

Team	Home city	Arena	Capacity
Baxi Ferrol	Ferrol	A Malata	4,200
Cadí La Seu	La Seu d'Urgell	Palau d'Esports	800
Casademont Zaragoza	Zaragoza	Pabellón Príncipe Felipe	10,744
Celta Femxa Zorka	Vigo	Navia	1,500
Club Joventut Badalona	Badalona	Palau Municipal d'Esports	12,760
Durán Maquinaria Ensino	Lugo	Pazo dos Deportes	5,310
Hozono Global Jairis	Alcantarilla	Fausto Vicent	1,240
IDK Euskotren	San Sebastián	José Antonio Gasca	2,500
Kutxabank Araski	Vitoria-Gasteiz	Mendizorrotza	2,603
Lointek Gernika Bizkaia	Gernika	Maloste	800
Movistar Estudiantes	Madrid	Antonio Magariños	600
Osés Construcción	Zizur Mayor	Arrosadía	1,500
Perfumerías Avenida	Salamanca	Würzburg	3,000
Spar Girona	Girona	Fontajau	5,200
Spar Gran Canaria	Las Palmas	La Paterna	1,600
Valencia Basket	Valencia	La Fonteta	8,500

== History ==
=== Pre playoffs era ===
Season	Champion	Runner-up
1964	CREFF Madrid	Medina Madrid
1965	CREFF Madrid	Indo Barcelona
1965–66	Medina La Coruña	CREFF Madrid
1966–67	CREFF Madrid	Medina La Coruña
1967–68	CREFF Madrid	CE Mataró
1968–69	CREFF Madrid	Medina La Coruña
1969–70	CREFF Madrid	Medina La Coruña
1970–71	CREFF Madrid	CE Mataró
1971–72	CE Mataró	Picadero JC
1972–73	CE Mataró	Picadero JC
1973–74	CE Mataró	Celta Vigo
1974–75	Picadero JC	CE Mataró
1975–76	Picadero JC	CE Mataró
1976–77	Celta Vigo	Picadero JC
1977–78	Picadero JC	Celta Vigo
1978–79	Celta Vigo	Picadero JC
1979–80	Picadero JC	Celta Vigo
1980–81	Picadero JC	Celta Vigo
1981–82	Celta Vigo	Picadero JC
1982–83	Picadero JC	Real Canoe
1983–84	Real Canoe	Celta Vigo
1984–85	Real Canoe	El Masnou Bàsquetbol
1985–86	Real Canoe	CB Tortosa
1986–87	CB Tortosa	CD Xuncas
1987–88	CB Tortosa	Tintoretto Getafe
1988–89	CB Tortosa	CD Xuncas
1989–90	El Masnou Bàsquetbol	Tintoretto Getafe
1990–91	CB Godella	Celta Vigo
1991–92	CB Godella	BF Zaragoza
1992–93	CB Godella	BEX
1993–94	CB Godella	CB Islas Canarias
1994–95	CB Godella	CB Islas Canarias
1995–96	CB Godella	CB Avenida

=== Playoffs era ===
Season	Champion	Runner-up	Score
1996–97	Pool Getafe	Real Canoe	2–1
1997–98	Pool Getafe	Celta Vigo	2–1
1998–99	Celta Vigo	Halcón Viajes	2–0
1999–00	Celta Vigo	CB Islas Canarias	2–1
2000–01	Ros Casares Valencia	UB - FC Barcelona	3–2
2001–02	Ros Casares Valencia	UB - FC Barcelona	3–0
2002–03	UB - FC Barcelona	Ros Casares Valencia	3–2
2003–04	Ros Casares Valencia	UB - FC Barcelona	3–0
2004–05	UB - FC Barcelona	Ros Casares Valencia	3–2
2005–06	CB Avenida	UB - FC Barcelona	3–1
2006–07	Ros Casares Valencia	CB Avenida	3–2
2007–08	Ros Casares Valencia	CB Avenida	2–1
2008–09	Ros Casares Valencia	CB Avenida	2–0
2009–10	Ros Casares Valencia	CB Avenida	2–0
2010–11	CB Avenida	Ros Casares Valencia	2–0
2011–12	Ros Casares Valencia	CB Avenida	2–0
2012–13	CB Avenida	Rivas Ecópolis	2–0
2013–14	Rivas Ecópolis	CB Avenida	2–0
2014–15	Uni Girona CB	CB Avenida	2–0
2015–16	CB Avenida	Uni Girona CB	2–1
2016–17	CB Avenida	Uni Girona CB	2–1
2017–18	CB Avenida	Uni Girona CB	2–0
2018–19	Uni Girona CB	CB Avenida	2–0
2019–20	Canceled due to the COVID-19 pandemic in Spain		
2020–21	CB Avenida	Valencia Basket	2–1
2021–22	CB Avenida	Valencia Basket	2–0
2022–23	Valencia Basket	CB Avenida	2–0
2023–24	Valencia Basket	CB Avenida	2–0
2024–25	Valencia Basket	Casademont Zaragoza	2–0
2025–26	Valencia Basket	Casademont Zaragoza	2–0

=== Performance by club ===
Club	Winners	Winning years
CB Godella-Pool Getafe	8	1991, 1992, 1993, 1994, 1995, 1996, 1997, 1998
Ros Casares Valencia	8	2001, 2002, 2004, 2007, 2008, 2009, 2010, 2012
CB Avenida	8	2006, 2011, 2013, 2016, 2017, 2018, 2021, 2022
CREFF Madrid	7	1964, 1965, 1967, 1968, 1969, 1970, 1971
Picadero-El Masnou	7	1975, 1976, 1978, 1980, 1981, 1983, 1990
Celta Vigo	5	1977, 1979, 1982, 1999, 2000
Valencia Basket	4	2023, 2024, 2025, 2026
CE Mataró	3	1972, 1973, 1974
Real Canoe	3	1984, 1985, 1986
CB Tortosa	3	1987, 1988, 1989
UB - FC Barcelona	2	2003, 2005
Uni Girona CB	2	2015, 2019
Medina La Coruña	1	1966
Rivas Ecópolis	1	2014

=== Stats leaders ===
Season	Top rating	PIR	Top scorer	PPG	Top rebounder	RPG	Top Assistant	APG
1997–98	(Lithuania) Jovita Jutelytė	24.09	(Spain) Rosi Sánchez	19.91	(Spain) Elisabeth Cebrián	12.82	(Spain) Carmen González	3.70
1998–99	(Spain) Nieves Anula	30.67	(Spain) Nieves Anula	27.58	(Spain) Elisabeth Cebrián	8.80	(Spain) Sandra Gallego	3.31
1999–00	(United States) Brandy Reed	25.77	(United States) Brandy Reed	25.19	(United States) Pollyanna Johns	11.43	(Spain) Amaya Valdemoro	2.88
2000–01	(Spain) Amaya Valdemoro	21.88	(Spain) Amaya Valdemoro	22.40	(Central African Republic) Françoise Meyendo	10.96	(Spain) Raquel Delgado	2.72
2001–02	(Bosnia and Herzegovina) Razija Mujanović	25.09	(Croatia) Korie Hlede	20.12	(Bosnia and Herzegovina) Razija Mujanović	10.14	(Russia) Yelena Tornikidu	3.27
2002–03	(Russia) Yelena Tornikidu	25.77	(United States) Shannon Johnson	23.12	(United States) Dale Hodges	10.96	(Spain) María José Alonso	4.62
2003–04	(United States) Tamika Whitmore	23.28	(United States) Tamika Whitmore	23.00	(United States) Jermisha Dosty	10.35	(Spain) Nuria Martínez	3.35
2004–05	(Russia) Yelena Tornikidu	24.88	(Russia) Yelena Tornikidu	20.68	(United States) Amisha Carter	10.31	(Spain) Clara Bermejo	4.12
2005–06	(Brazil) Érika de Souza	25.20	(United States) LaToya Thomas	19.00	(Brazil) Érika de Souza	12.92	(Spain) Sílvia Domínguez	4.42
2006–07	(Spain) Marta Fernández	22.22	(United States) Kaayla Chones	19.08	(United States) Brooke Wyckoff	11.62	(Spain) Silvia Morales	4.62
2007–08	(United States) Le'coe Willingham	24.42	(United States) Roneeka Hodges	20.19	(United States) Le'coe Willingham	11.04	(Spain) Silvia Morales	5.00
2008–09	(Saint Vincent and the Grenadines) Sancho Lyttle	27.39	(United States) Shay Murphy	20.73	(Saint Vincent and the Grenadines) Sancho Lyttle	11.56	(Spain) Sílvia Domínguez	4.08
2009–10	(Saint Vincent and the Grenadines) Sancho Lyttle	26.92	(United States) Shay Murphy	21.12	(Saint Vincent and the Grenadines) Sancho Lyttle	10.68	(Spain) Clara Bermejo	3.88
2010–11	(United States) Shay Murphy	23.54	(United States) Shay Murphy	25.58	(United States) Courtney Paris	8.77	(Paraguay) Paola Ferrari	4.15
2011–12	(United States) Angelica Robinson	21.00	(United States) D'Andra Moss	20.15	(United States) Angelica Robinson	11.15	(Spain) Lorena Infante	5.42
2012–13	(Spain) Vanessa Blé	21.40	(United States) Bernice Mosby	19.27	(Spain) Vanessa Blé	11.30	(Spain) Noemí Jordana	4.00
2013–14	(Spain) Astou Ndour	24.95	(United States) Charde Houston	19.64	(Spain) Astou Ndour	13.23	(Spain) Arantxa Gómez	6.32
2014–15	(United States) Ify Ibekwe	23.76	(United States) Bernice Mosby	19.19	(United States) Samarie Walker	11.46	(Spain) Noemí Jordana	4.69
2015–16	(Nigeria) Adaora Elonu	21.68	(Paraguay) Paola Ferrari	19.15	(United States) Talia Caldwell	11.30	(Spain) Arantxa Gómez	5.39
2016–17	(Brazil) Nádia Colhado	21.84	(United States) Roneeka Hodges	16.90	(United States) Julia Forster	11.54	(Paraguay) Paola Ferrari	5.29
2017–18	(United States) Shacobia Barbee	18.77	(United States) Shayla Cooper	19.00	(Jamaica) Vanessa Gidden	13.11	(Spain) Gaby Ocete	5.19
2018–19	(Mali) Mariam Coulibaly	17.04	(United States) Ariel Edwards	17.73	(Mali) Mariam Coulibaly	10.88	(Spain) Anna Gómez	6.12
2019–20	(United States) Tinara Moore	18.55	(United States) Tanaya Atkinson	19.57	(Jamaica) Vanessa Gidden	8.68	(Spain) Sílvia Domínguez	5.64
2020–21	(Mali) Sika Koné	21.90	(United States) Markeisha Gatling	19.70	(Mali) Sika Koné	11.63	(Serbia) Aleksandra Stanaćev	4.90
2021–22	(Mali) Sika Koné	20.11	(United States) Tanaya Atkinson	16.39	(Mali) Sika Koné	11.32	(Spain) Cristina Ouviña	4.65
2022–23	(Mali) Sika Koné	27.63	(Mali) Sika Koné	17.47	(Mali) Sika Koné	14.17	(Argentina) Melisa Gretter	5.24
2023–24	(Sweden) Regan Magarity	19.00	(United States) Jade Loville	15.71	(Cameroon) Dulcy Fankam	10.00	(Argentina) Melisa Gretter	4.43
2024–25	(Mali) Mariam Coulibaly	29.04	(Mali) Mariam Coulibaly	22.04	(Mali) Mariam Coulibaly	10.79	(Spain) Leticia Romero	5.42

=== All-time top performances ===
Active Liga Femenina player

==== Games played ====
Rank	Player	Position(s)	Seasons	Years	Games played
1	Noemí Jordana (ESP)	PG	19	1998–2017	540
2	Luci Pascua (ESP)	C	18	2002–2020	493
3	Laia Palau (ESP)	PG	16	1997–	447
4	Isa Sánchez (ESP)	SG	15	1997–2013	409
5	Laura Antoja (ESP)	PG	15	1997–2013	383
6	S. Domínguez (ESP)	PG	13	2005–	376
7	Thania Quintero (ESP)	SG	15	1997–2013	371
8	Clara Bermejo (ESP)	PG	14	2000–2014	370
9	Elisa Aguilar (ESP)	PG	12	2000–2012	363
10	María Pina (ESP)	SF	16	2005–	360

==== Points ====
Rank	Player	Position	Years	Points	Games played	Points per game
1	A. Valdemoro (ESP)	SF	1997–2012	5,190	305	17.0
2	Silvia Morales (ESP)	SG	1998–2012	4,994	344	14.5
3	Isa Sánchez (ESP)	SG	1997–2013	4,793	409	11.7
4	M. Fernández (ESP)	SG	1999–2015	4,737	358	13.2
5	Noemí Jordana (ESP)	PG	1998–2017	4,422	540	8.2
6	Érika de Souza (BRA)	C	2003–2020	4,266	341	12.5
7	Sandra Gallego (ESP)	SG	1997–2008	3,790	319	11.9
8	Rosi Sánchez (ESP)	SG	1997–2012	3,665	256	14.3
9	Paola Ferrari (PAR)	SF	2007–	3,527	294	12.0
10	Pilar Valero (ESP)	SG	1997–2010	3,495	334	10.5

==== Rebounds ====
Rank	Player	Position	Years	Rebounds	Games played	Rebounds per game
1	Érika de Souza (BRA)	C	2003–2020	3,000	341	8.8
2	Luci Pascua (ESP)	C	2002–2020	2,903	493	5.9
3	Ingrid Pons (ESP)	PF	1997–2008	2,133	341	6.3
4	Betty Cebrián (ESP)	C	1997–2005	1,581	217	7.3
5	Murriel Page (USA)	PF	2001–2010	1,578	181	8.7
6	Sancho Lyttle (VIN)	C	2006–2012	1,562	158	9.9
7	A. Valdemoro (ESP)	SF	1997–2012	1,541	305	5.1
8	Gisela Vega (ARG)	PF	2002–2018	1,530	216	7.1
9	Cindy Lima (ESP)	C	1998–2014	1,498	302	5.0
10	Laia Palau (ESP)	PG	1997–	1,480	447	3.3

==== Assists ====
Rank	Player	Position	Years	Assists	Games played	Assists per game
1	Laia Palau (ESP)	PG	1997–	1,366	447	3.1
2	S. Domínguez (ESP)	PG	2005–	1,352	376	3.6
3	Noemí Jordana (ESP)	PG	1998–2017	1,256	540	2.3
4	Gaby Ocete (ESP)	PG	2006–	1,134	312	3.6
5	Elisa Aguilar (ESP)	PG	2000–2012	1,003	363	2.8
6	Clara Bermejo (ESP)	PG	2000–2014	988	370	2.7
7	Silvia Morales (ESP)	SG	1998–2012	963	344	2.8
8	Anna Gómez (ESP)	PG	2004–	950	333	2.9
9	M. Fernández (ESP)	SG	1999–2015	883	358	2.5
10	Paola Ferrari (PAR)	SF	2007–	861	294	2.9

=== Records in a game ===
- Most points

- 49 by Amaya Valdemoro (Salamanca Halcón Viajes) vs. Ensino Universidade on April 10, 1999

- Most rebounds

- 25 by Natalia Urdiain (CBN) vs. Tony Roma's Real Canoe on February 14, 1998

- Most assists

- 16 by Paola Ferrari (Sóller Bon Día!) vs. UNB Obenasa Lacturale on December 21, 2011

- Most three-pointers

- 10 by Patricia Cabrera (GranCanaria.com) vs. Zamarat on March 28, 2015

- Most steals

- 12 by Arantxa Novo (Yaya María) vs. Cortegada on December 9, 2000

- Most blocks

- 8 by Vanessa Hayden (Perfumerías Avenida) vs. Yaya María on October 17, 2004

- Most PIR

- 61 by Amaya Valdemoro (Salamanca Halcón Viajes) vs. Femenino Tres Cantos on April 1, 2000

== See also ==
- Spanish Queen's Cup
- Spanish Supercup
