= UB-Barça =

- Founded: 1985
- Dissolved: 2007
- Arena: Palau Blaugrana
- Location: Barcelona
- Team colors: red & blue
- President: -
- Head coach: -
- Championships: 2 Liga Femenina

Club Bàsquet Femení Universitari de Barcelona–FC Barcelona was a Spanish Catalan women's basketball team. Initially named CBF Universitari de Barcelona, belonging just to the Universitat de Barcelona, it later became part of the FC Barcelona family. They used to have four base teams: junior, cadet, infantil and infantil'91.

UB-Barça was one of the most successful teams in the Spanish League in the first half of the 2000s, winning the championship in 2003 and 2005. However, in 2007 FC Barcelona retired its sponsorship, and the club, not being able to face its expenses, was relegated and disbanded.

Notable former players include Marta Fernández, Helen Luz, Razija Mujanović and Érika de Souza.

== Season by season ==
Season	Tier	Division	Pos.	Copa de la Reina	European competitions	
1996–97	1	Liga Femenina	3rd			
1997–98	1	Liga Femenina	3rd			
1998–99	1	Liga Femenina	9th			
1999–00	1	Liga Femenina	6th			
2000–01	1	Liga Femenina	2nd			
2001–02	1	Liga Femenina	2nd			
2002–03	1	Liga Femenina	1st			
2003–04	1	Liga Femenina	2nd		1 EuroLeague	GS
2004–05	1	Liga Femenina	1st	Semifinalist		
2005–06	1	Liga Femenina	2nd	Semifinalist		
2006–07	1	Liga Femenina	4th	Quarterfinalist	2 EuroCup	R16

== Trophies ==
- Liga Femenina: 2
  - Champions: 2002/03, 2004/05
