= CD CREF =

Spanish basketball team

CREF ¡Hola!
- Leagues: Liga Femenina
- Founded: 1960 (re-founded in 1990)
- History: CREFF Madrid (1960–1980); CD CREF (1990–present)
- Arena: Pabellón Canal de Isabel II
- Location: Madrid
- Team colors: Red, white and navy
- President: Teresa Pérez de Villota
- Head coach: Antonio Pernas
- Championships: 7 Spanish Leagues; 4 Spanish Cups
- Website: cdcref.com
Home	Away

Club Deportivo CREF is a women's basketball team based in Madrid that currently plays in the Spanish Liga Femenina de Baloncesto.

== History ==
=== 1960–1980: CREFF ===
Colegios Reunidos de Educación Física Femenina de Madrid was founded in 1960 by the Sección Femenina of the Movimiento Nacional, during the Francoism.

Its women's basketball team dominated the early stages of the Spanish League, winning seven titles between 1964 and 1971, and representing Spain in the FIBA European Cup with few success. Back then the team was considered the Real Madrid of women's basketball, and it shared arena with Real Madrid's male basketball team. Raimundo Saporta tried to convince Santiago Bernabéu to turn CREFF into the women's basketball section of Real Madrid, but failed in his attempt.

After the Movimiento Nacional was disbanded in 1977 the team couldn't find a sponsor and disappeared three years later.

=== 1990–present: re-foundation ===
In 1990 it was refounded as Deportivo CREF, also known as CREF ¡Hola! by sponsorship reasons. The club had also a men's basketball section that played in Liga EBA, but its senior team was disbanded in 2007.

On 26 April 2015, the club achieved the promotion to the top tier after beating Fundal Alcobendas by 77–68 in the final game of the promotion playoffs.

CREF remained two seasons in the top league before being relegated to Liga Femenina 2. However, due to the lack of support and sponsorships, the club decided to dissolve the senior team and to continue playing only in youth competitions.

== Season by season ==
Season	Tier	Division	Pos.
2012–13	3	1ª División	2nd
2013–14	2	Liga Femenina 2	4th
2014–15	2	Liga Femenina 2	1st
2015–16	1	Liga Femenina	7th
2016–17	1	Liga Femenina	13th

== Titles ==
- LFB (7)
  - 1964, 1965, 1967, 1968, 1969, 1970, 1971
- Copa de la Reina (4)
  - 1962, 1963, 1972, 1974

== Current roster ==
CREFF ¡Hola! roster roster
Players
Coaches

Pos.	No.	Nat.	Name	Ht.	Wt.	Age
SG	9	(United States)	Amukamara, Promise	1.73 m (5 ft 8 in)		31 – 22 June 1993
PG	10	(Portugal)	Bettencourt, Maria	1.72 m (5 ft 8 in)		34 – 28 February 1991
SG	51	(Serbia)	Butulija, Dajana	1.76 m (5 ft 9 in)		39 – 23 February 1986
SF	12	(Spain)	Espín, María	1.80 m (5 ft 11 in)		35 – 4 June 1989
C	7	(United States)	Leary, Shakeja	1.90 m (6 ft 3 in)		34 – 3 November 1990
SG	5	(Spain)	Moreno, Esther	1.78 m (5 ft 10 in)		39 – 21 August 1985
PF	4	(Latvia)	Rubene, Linda	1.95 m (6 ft 5 in)		38 – 3 February 1987
PF	41	(United Kingdom)	Thompson, Jamila	1.93 m (6 ft 4 in)		32 – 27 June 1992
SF	1	(United States)	Weaver, Lynda	1.95 m (6 ft 5 in)		38 – 3 February 1987
PG	13	(Spain)	Ygueravide, Sandra	1.72 m (5 ft 8 in)		40 – 28 December 1984

Head coach

- (Spain) Antonio Pernas

Assistant coach(es)

- (Spain) Marcos Forondia
- (Spain) Javier Lombardía

Legend

- (C) Team captain
- Injured

- Roster
Updated: September 25, 2015

== Notable players ==
- (Latvia) Elīna Dikaioulaku
