= 2008–09 Liga Femenina de Baloncesto =

2008-09 Liga Femenina season
- League: Liga Femenina
- Sport: Basketball
- Duration: October 2008–March 2009 (regular season); April 2009 (playoff)
- Number of games: 182 (regular season)
- Number of teams: 14
- Finals champions: Ros Casares Valencia
- Runners-up: Perfumerías Avenida

Liga Femenina seasons
- ← 2007–08 2009–10 →

The 2008–09 Liga Femenina de Baloncesto was the 46th edition of the Spanish premier championship for women's basketball teams. Ros Casares Valencia defeated Perfumerías Avenida in the final to win its third title in a row, an overall sixth. Rivas Ecópolis also qualified for the FIBA Euroleague along with Ros Casares and Avenida, while Feve San José, Espanyol Olesa and EBE Puig d'en Valls qualified for the FIBA Eurocup. On the other hand, Mann Filter Zaragoza and Extrugasa Cortegada were relegated as the two bottom teams. However, Feve San José was disbanded following the end of the season and Espanyol Olesa renounced to its Eurocup place for financial reasons, so Mann Filter Zaragoza was spared from relegation and invited to the Eurocup along with CB Islas Canarias.

== Teams by autonomous community ==
Autonomous community	Teams
(Castile and León) Castilla y León	2: Feve San José, Perfumerías Avenida
(Catalonia) Catalunya	2: Cadí Sedís, Espanyol Olesa
(Galicia (Spain)) Galicia	2: Celta Vigo, Extrugasa Cortegada
(Balearic Islands) Islas Baleares	2: Joventut Mariana, EBE Puig d'en Valls
(Community of Madrid) Madrid	2: MMT Estudiantes, Rivas Ecópolis
(Aragon) Aragón	1: Mann Filter Zaragoza
(Valencian Community) Comunidad Valenciana	1: Ros Casares Valencia
(Basque Country (autonomous community)) Euskadi	1: Txingudi Hondarribia
(Canary Islands) Islas Canarias	1: CB Islas Canarias

== Regular season ==
#	Teams	Pld	W	L	PF	PA	PS	Q/R	FIBA
1	Ros Casares Valencia	26	25	1	2202	1628	Same position	Qualified for the play-offs	Qualified for the Euroleague
2	Perfumerías Avenida	26	19	7	1964	1787	Same position	Qualified for the play-offs	Qualified for the Euroleague
3	Rivas Ecópolis	26	18	8	1773	1644	▲2	Qualified for the play-offs	Qualified for the Euroleague
4	Feve San José	26	17	9	1864	1802	Same position	Qualified for the play-offs, subsequently disbanded	Qualified for the Eurocup, but renounced
5	Espanyol Olesa	26	17	9	1871	1792	▲3	Qualified for the Eurocup play-offs	Qualified for the Eurocup, but renounced
6	Joventut Mariana	26	15	11	1865	1865	New entry	Qualified for the Eurocup play-offs	
7	EBE Puig d'en Valls	26	14	12	1806	1737	▼4	Qualified for the Eurocup play-offs	Qualified for the Eurocup
8	Txingudi Hondarribia	26	13	13	1860	1953	▲3	Qualified for the Eurocup play-offs	
9	Celta Vigo	26	11	15	1643	1671	▼2		
10	Cadí Sedís	26	9	17	1686	1862	▼1		
11	CB Islas Canarias	26	7	19	1752	1902	▼1		Invited to the Eurocup
12	MMT Estudiantes	26	6	20	1575	1800	New entry		
13	Mann Filter Zaragoza	26	6	20	1613	1874	▼1	Spared from relegation	Invited to the Eurocup
14	Extrugasa Cortegada	26	5	21	1669	1826	▼8	Relegated to Liga Femenina 2	

== Championship play-offs ==
=== Semifinals ===
Team #1	Agg.	Team #2	1st leg	2nd leg	3rd leg^{*}
Ros Casares Valencia	2-0	Feve San José	81-59	96-77	
Perfumerías Avenida	2-1	Rivas Ecópolis	67-75	60-49	75–61

Rivas Ecópolis qualifies for the FIBA Euroleague. Feve San José qualifies for the FIBA Eurocup. However, Feve San José later disappeared and was replaced by CB Islas Canarias.

=== Final ===
Team #1	Agg.	Team #2	1st leg	2nd leg	3rd leg^{*}
Ros Casares Valencia	2-0	Perfumerías Avenida	96-56	70-66	

Liga Femenina de Baloncesto 2008-09 Champions
Ros Casares Valencia
Sixth title

== FIBA Eurocup play-offs ==
Team #1	Agg.	Team #2	1st leg	2nd leg	3rd leg^{*}
Espanyol Olesa	2-0	Txingudi Hondarribia	77-76	75-73	–
Joventut Mariana	0-2	EBE Puig d'en Valls	71-89	79-96	–

Espanyol Olesa and EBE Puig d'en Valls qualify for the FIBA Eurocup. However, Espanyol Olesa later renounced and was replaced by Mann Filter Zaragoza.
