= 2009–10 Liga Femenina de Baloncesto =

2009–10 Liga Femenina season
- League: Liga Femenina
- Sport: Basketball
- Duration: October 2009–March 2011 (regular season); April 2011 (playoff)
- Number of games: 182 (regular season)
- Number of teams: 14
- Finals champions: Ros Casares Valencia
- Runners-up: Perfumerías Avenida

Liga Femenina seasons
- ← 2008–09 2010–11 →

The 2009–10 Liga Femenina de Baloncesto was the 47th edition of the Spanish premier championship for women's basketball teams. Defending champion Ros Casares again defeated CB Avenida in the final to win its fourth title in a row, an overall seventh. CB Rivas and CDB Zaragoza also qualified for the championship play-offs. Ros Casares, Avenida and Rivas qualified for the 2010–11 Euroleague, while Zaragoza and CB Islas Canarias qualified for the 2010–11 Eurocup. On the other hand, Real Canoe and CB Estudiantes were relegated.

== Teams by autonomous community ==
Autonomous community	Teams
(Community of Madrid) Madrid	3: Estudiantes, Real Canoe, Rivas
(Catalonia) Catalunya	3: Olesa, Sedis, Uni Girona
(Balearic Islands) Islas Baleares	2: Joventut Mariana, Puig d'en Valls
(Aragon) Aragón	1: Zaragoza
(Castile and León) Castilla y León	1: Avenida
(Valencian Community) Comunidad Valenciana	1: Ros Casares
(Basque Country (autonomous community)) Euskadi	1: Txingudi
(Galicia (Spain)) Galicia	1: Celta Vigo
(Canary Islands) Islas Canarias	1: Islas Canarias

== Regular season ==
#	Teams	Pld	W	L	PF	PA	PS	Q/R	FIBA
1	Ros Casares	26	25	1	2233	1668	Same position	Qualified for the play-offs	Qualified for the Euroleague
2	Avenida	26	23	3	1928	1621	Same position	Qualified for the play-offs	Qualified for the Euroleague
3	Rivas	26	21	5	1884	1615	Same position	Qualified for the play-offs	Qualified for the Euroleague
4	Zaragoza	26	14	12	1703	1700	▲9	Qualified for the play-offs	Qualified for the Eurocup
5	Uni Girona	26	13	13	1682	1774	New entry		Qualified for the Eurocup, but renounced^{1}
6	Celta Vigo	26	13	13	1821	1827	▲3		
7	Olesa	26	12	14	1895	1958	▼2		
8	Islas Canarias	26	12	14	1796	1825	▲3		Invited to the Eurocup^{1}
9	Joventut Mariana	26	12	14	1831	1895	▼3		
10	Sedis	26	11	15	1893	1945	Same position		
11	Txingudi	26	8	18	1699	1858	▼3		
12	Real Canoe	26	8	18	1710	1955	New entry	Relegated ^{2}	
13	Estudiantes	26	6	20	1605	1826	▼1	Relegated	
14	Puig d'en Valls	26	4	22	1662	1875	▼7	Spared from relegation ^{2}	

^{1} Despite qualifying for the FIBA EuroCup Uni Girona withdrew from the competition for financial reasons. It was replaced by CB Islas Canarias.
^{2} Despite avoiding relegation Real Canoe withdrew from the championship for financial reasons. CB Puig d'en Valls subsequently bought its place in the championship.

== Play-offs ==
=== Semifinals ===
Team #1	Agg.	Team #2	1st leg	2nd leg	3rd leg^{*}
Ros Casares	2-0	Zaragoza	80-64	79-52	
Perfumerías Avenida	2-0	Rivas	65-59	68-65	

=== Final ===
Team #1	Agg.	Team #2	1st leg	2nd leg	3rd leg^{*}
Ros Casares	2-0	Avenida	78-69	82-78	

Liga Femenina de Baloncesto 2009-10 Champions
(Valencian Community) Ros Casares Valencia
Seventh title
