= Antonio María Valencia =

Colombian composer and pianist (1902–1952)

Antonio María Valencia (10 November 1902 – 22 July 1952) was a Colombian composer and pianist, one of his country’s most important classical musicians in the first half of the twentieth century. He composed in several genres. Among his most important cultural achievements was to promote the creation of the first conservatory in the southwest region of Colombia in the city of Cali. This conservatory is currently part of the Instituto Departamental de Bellas Artes.

== Biography ==
Antonio Maria Valencia was born in Cali, Colombia on 10 November 1902. He received his first musical lessons from his father, cellist Julio Valencia Belmonte. From 1917 to 1919 he was a student at the Bogotá Conservatory where he studied piano with Honorio Alarcón. Thanks to a scholarship he traveled to France in 1923 to pursue further music studies at the Schola Cantorum de Paris (SCP). He was a student there for three years and graduated in 1926 with a degree in piano performance. His teachers at SCP included Paul Braud (piano), Léon de Saint-Réquier (harmony), Paul Le Flem (counterpoint), Manuel De Falla (orchestration), Gabriel Pierné (chamber music), and Vincent d'Indy (composition and conducting).

In 1929 Valencia returned to his native country to teach at the music conservatory of the National University of Colombia; but resigned in 1931 after having conflicts with the school's director, Guillermo Uribe Holguín. He subsequently founded his own music school in Cali in 1933, the Conservatorio y Escuela de Bellas Artes (CEBA), which he led almost continuously as its director until his death nearly 20 year later. He briefly left his role at CEBA in 1937-1938 academic year to serve for an 18 month period as director of the Bogata Conservatory.

The nationalistic style of his compositions became a model for his generation in Colombia. He composed piano, chamber and choral pieces, using folk melodies and rhythms with impressionist harmonies.
