= 2010–11 Liga Femenina de Baloncesto =

2010–11 Liga Femenina season
- League: Liga Femenina
- Sport: Basketball
- Duration: October 2010–March 2011 (regular season); April 2012 (playoff)
- Number of games: 182 (regular season)
- Number of teams: 14
- Finals champions: Perfumerías Avenida
- Runners-up: Ros Casares Valencia

Liga Femenina seasons
- ← 2009–10 2011–12 →

The 2010-11 Liga Femenina de Baloncesto was the 48th edition of the Spanish premier women's basketball championship. It took place from 10 October 2010 to 28 April 2011. Fourteen teams took part in the championship, with UNB Obenasa Lacturale and Extrugasa replacing relegated teams CB Estudiantes and Real Canoe.

Perfumerías Avenida won its second title, ending Ros Casares Valencia' four-year winning streak. The Salmantine team also won the Euroleague. Mann Filter Zaragoza and Copa de la Reina champion Rivas Ecópolis also qualified for the play-offs, while Unión Navarra and CB Olesa were relegated. However, the Navarre team was spared from relegation in July as Extrugasa renounced its spot due to financial stress.

== Regular season ==
#	Team	Pld	W	L	PF	PA	2010	Postseason
1	Perfumerías Avenida	26	25	1	2026	1624	1	Qualified for playoffs
2	Ros Casares Valencia	26	23	3	2067	1443	1	Qualified for playoffs
3	Mann Filter Zaragoza	26	19	7	1723	1490	1	Qualified for playoffs
4	Rivas Ecópolis	26	18	8	1920	1654	1	Qualified for playoffs
5	Girona FC	26	13	13	1673	1699		
6	Sóller Bon Día!	26	13	13	1856	1931	3	
7	Palacio de Congresos Ibiza	26	11	15	1656	1723	7	
8	Hondarribia-Irún	26	11	15	1656	1723	2	
9	Gran Canaria 2014 La Caja de Canarias	26	10	16	1675	1771	1	
10	Extrugasa	26	10	16	1589	1669	(N)	Asked for relegation
11	RC Celta Indepo	26	9	17	1681	1834	5	
12	Cadí La Seu d'Urgell	26	9	17	1743	1920	2	
13	UNB Obenasa Lacturale	26	7	19	1596	1838	(N)	Spared from relegation due to vacance berths
14	CB Olesa	26	4	22	1557	2092	7	Relegated

== Championship Playoffs ==
SemiFinals
1	Perfumerías Avenida	2
4	Rivas Ecópolis	0
2	Ros Casares Valencia	2
3	Mann Filter Zaragoza	0

Finals
1	Perfumerías Avenida	2
2	Ros Casares Valencia	0

=== Semifinals ===
14 April 2011
20:00

Report

Perfumerías Avenida (Castile and León)	69–65	(Community of Madrid) Rivas Ecópolis
Scoring by quarter: 12–9, 18–21, 11–15, 28–20
Pts: Torrens 14; Rebs: de Souza 9 Asts: Domínguez 6		Pts: Valdemoro 25; Rebs: Bonner 6 Asts: Valdemoro 2

Pabellón de Würzburg, Salamanca

16 April 2011
20:00

Report

Rivas Ecópolis (Community of Madrid)	60–66	(Castile and León) Perfumerías Avenida
Scoring by quarter: 18–20, 13–10, 21–16, 8–20
Pts: Valdemoro 16; Rebs: Bonner 11; Asts: Valdemoro 4		Pts: Torrens 16; Rebs: Lyttle 10; Asts: Lyttle 3

Pabellón Cerro del Telégrado, Rivas-Vaciamadrid

14 April 2011
20:00

Report

Ros Casares Valencia (Valencian Community)	89–54	(Aragon) Mann Filter Zaragoza
Scoring by quarter: 25–18, 22–9, 21–17, 21–10
Pts: Brunson 19; Rebs: Douglas 8 Asts: Palau 6		Pts: Casas 10; Rebs: Henry 6 Asts: Zlatanova 3

Pabellón Fuente de San Luis, Valencia

16 April 2011
20:00

Report

Mann Filter Zaragoza (Aragon)	58–64	(Valencian Community) Ros Casares Valencia
Scoring by quarter: 14–13, 16–22, 11–16, 17–13
Pts: Henry 14; Rebs: Henry 10; Asts: Ouviña 4		Pts: Brunson, Douglas 14; Rebs: Brunson 10; Asts: Anosike 3

Pabellón Siglo XXI, Zaragoza

=== Final ===
26 April 2011
11:00

Report

Perfumerías Avenida (Castile and León)	79–73	(Valencian Community) Ros Casares Valencia
Scoring by quarter: 20–20, 20–14, 22–20, 17–20
Pts: de Souza 29; Rebs: de Souza 12; Asts: Domínguez, de Mondt 4		Pts: Brunson 19; Rebs: Brunson 11; Asts: Palau 4

Pabellón de Würzburg, Salamanca

28 April 2011
20:00

Report

Ros Casares Valencia (Valencian Community)	85–90	(Castile and León) Perfumerías Avenida
Scoring by quarter: 32–24, 7–25, 24–18, 22–23
Pts: Brunson 26; Rebs: Anosike, Brunson 7 Asts: Palau 7		Pts: de Souza 19; Rebs: de Souza 12; Asts: de Mondt 4

Pabellón Fuente de San Luis, Valencia
