= Lucía Gutiérrez =

Lucía Gutiérrez may refer to:

- Lucía Gutiérrez Puerta (stage name Lucía Guilmáin, 1938–2021), Mexican actress
- Lucía Gutiérrez Rebolloso, Mexican jazz singer
- Lucía Gutiérrez Samper, pianist, wife of Guillermo Uribe Holguín
- Lucía Gutiérrez, Spanish basketball player with Celta de Vigo Baloncesto
