= List of WNBA career free throw scoring leaders =

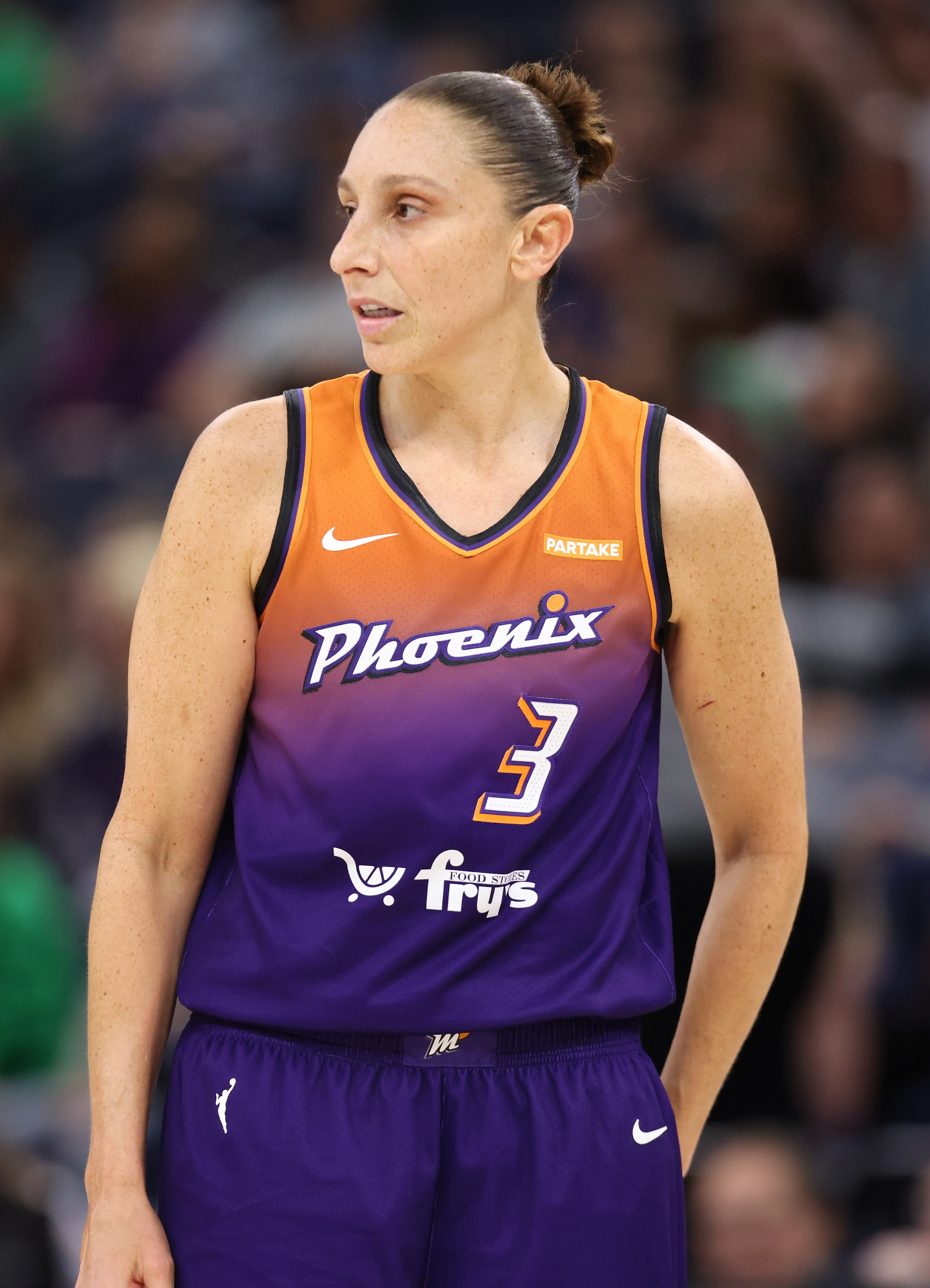
Diana Taurasi has made the most free throws in WNBA history.

This is a list of Women's National Basketball Association players by total career regular season free throws made.

== Free throws made leaders ==
Statistics accurate as of the 2026 season.

^	Active WNBA player
*	Inducted into the Naismith Memorial Basketball Hall of Fame
†	Not yet eligible for Hall of Fame consideration (Note: A player is not eligible for induction into the Naismith Memorial Basketball Hall of Fame until the player has been fully retired for two calendar years.)
§	1st time eligible for Hall of Fame in 2025

Rank	Player	Position(s)	Team(s) played for (years)	Total free throws made	Total free throws attempted	Free throw percentage	Free throws made per game
1	Diana Taurasi^{†}	G	Phoenix Mercury (2004–2024)	2,517	2,893	.870	4.45
2	DeWanna Bonner^	F/G	Phoenix Mercury (2009–2019, 2025–2026); Connecticut Sun (2020–2024); Indiana Fever (2025); Atlanta Dream (2026–present)	2,035	2,374	.857	3.53
3	Tamika Catchings*	F	Indiana Fever (2002–2016)	2,004	2,386	.840	4.39
4	A'ja Wilson^	C	Las Vegas Aces (2018–present)	1,737	2,098	.828	5.64
5	Breanna Stewart^	F	Seattle Storm (2016–2022); New York Liberty (2023–present)	1,673	1,999	.837	5.01
6	Angel McCoughtry	F/G	Atlanta Dream (2009–2019); Las Vegas Aces (2020–2021); Minnesota Lynx (2022)	1,512	1,885	.802	4.86
7	Skylar Diggins^	G	Tulsa Shock/Dallas Wings (2013–2019); Phoenix Mercury (2020–2023); Seattle Storm (2024–2025); Chicago Sky (2026–present)	1,491	1,776	.840	4.21
8	Tina Thompson*	F	Houston Comets (1997–2008); Los Angeles Sparks (2009–2011); Seattle Storm (2012–2013)	1,480	1,779	.832	2.98
9	Lisa Leslie*	C	Los Angeles Sparks (1997–2009)	1,477	2,125	.695	4.07
10	Tina Charles^{†}	C	Connecticut Sun (2010–2013); New York Liberty (2014–2019); Washington Mystics (2021); Phoenix Mercury (2022); Seattle Storm (2022); Atlanta Dream (2024); Connecticut Sun (2025)	1,471	1,876	.784	3.11
11	Cappie Pondexter	G	Phoenix Mercury (2006–2009); New York Liberty (2010–2014); Chicago Sky (2015–2017); Los Angeles Sparks (2018); Indiana Fever (2018)	1,455	1,729	.842	3.50
12	Katie Smith*	G	Minnesota Lynx (1999–2005); Detroit Shock (2005–2009); Washington Mystics (2010); Seattle Storm (2011–2012); New York Liberty (2013)	1,440	1,677	.859	2.99
13	Nneka Ogwumike^	F	Los Angeles Sparks (2012–2023, 2026–present); Seattle Storm (2024–2025)	1,420	1,690	.840	2.96
14	Lindsay Whalen*	G	Connecticut Sun (2004–2009); Minnesota Lynx (2010–2018)	1,407	1,733	.812	2.93
15	Swin Cash*	F	Detroit Shock (2002–2007); Seattle Storm (2008–2011); Chicago Sky (2012–2013); Atlanta Dream (2014); New York Liberty (2014–2016)	1,397	1,845	.757	2.92
16	Lauren Jackson*	F/C	Seattle Storm (2001–2012)	1,391	1,653	.842	4.39
17	Jewell Loyd^	G	Seattle Storm (2015–2024); Las Vegas Aces (2025–present)	1,387	1,578	.879	3.36
18	Sylvia Fowles*	C	Chicago Sky (2008–2014); Minnesota Lynx (2015–2022)	1,352	1,857	.728	3.31
19	Tiffany Hayes^	G	Atlanta Dream (2012–2022); Connecticut Sun (2023); Las Vegas Aces (2024); Golden State Valkyries (2025–present)	1,342	1,698	.790	3.21
20	Candace Parker*	F/C	Los Angeles Sparks (2008–2020); Chicago Sky (2021–2022); Las Vegas Aces (2023)	1,290	1,682	.767	3.15
21	Monique Currie	F	Charlotte Sting (2006); Chicago Sky (2007); Washington Mystics (2007–2014, 2018); Phoenix Mercury (2015, 2017); San Antonio Stars (2016–2017)	1,273	1,546	.823	3.10
22	Brittney Griner^	C	Phoenix Mercury (2013–2024); Atlanta Dream (2025); Connecticut Sun (2026–present)	1,266	1,598	.792	3.40
23	Yolanda Griffith*	C/F	Sacramento Monarchs (1999–2007); Seattle Storm (2008); Indiana Fever (2009)	1,232	1,728	.713	3.96
24	Kayla McBride^	G	San Antonio Stars/Las Vegas Aces (2014–2020); Minnesota Lynx (2021–present)	1,232	1,371	.899	2.95
25	Becky Hammon*	G	New York Liberty (1999–2006); San Antonio Silver Stars/Stars (2007–2014)	1,182	1,318	.897	2.63
