= 2020 WNBA playoffs =

Professional women's basketball tournament

- Dates: September 15 – October 6, 2020

Final positions
- Champions: Seattle Storm
- Runners-up: Las Vegas Aces

Tournament statistics
- Scoring leader (s): A'ja Wilson (Las Vegas) (20.8 PPG)

Awards
- MVP: Breanna Stewart (Seattle)

The 2020 WNBA playoffs was the postseason tournament of the WNBA's 2020 season being played in Bradenton, Florida at the IMG Academy, known for the season as the "wubble." The Seattle Storm defeated the Las Vegas Aces three games to zero in the finals to claim the franchise's fourth WNBA title.

== Format ==
Following the WNBA regular season, the top eight teams in the overall league standings, without regard to conference alignment, qualified for the playoffs and were seeded from one to eight. Seedings were based strictly on regular-season record. The team with the best record received the #1 seed, the team with the next best record received the #2 seed, and so on. The top two seeds earned double byes (i.e., advanced directly to the semifinals), while the next two seeds received first-round byes.

These seedings were used to create a bracket that determines the matchups throughout the playoffs. The first round of the playoffs consisted of two matchups based on the seedings (5-8 and 6-7). The two winners advanced to the second round with a matchup between the number three seed and the lower of the advancing seeds and another matchup between the number four seed and the other first round winner. The winners of the first two rounds advanced to the semifinals, where the lower-ranked seed of the winners faces the number one seed, with the other remaining team facing the number two seed.

=== Changes due to COVID-19 ===
The playoffs were less affected than the regular season for the WNBA. Format and seeding remained the same as it has in recent years. However, the teams continued to play at the IMG Academy in Bradenton, Florida, thereby eliminating any home court advantages teams might have had in a normal playoffs. Dates for the playoffs remained largely the same as a normal season. No fans were allowed in the arena during the playoffs.

=== Tiebreak procedures ===
1. Better winning percentage among all head-to-head games involving tied teams.
2. Better winning percentage against all teams with .500 or better record at the end of the season.
3. Better point differential in games net result of total points scored less total points allowed head-to-head.
4. Better point differential net result of total points scored less total points allowed against all opponents.
5. Coin toss (or draw of lots, if at least three teams are still tied after the first four tiebreakers fail).

== Broadcast ==
On September 8, the league announced that all playoff games will be broadcast on the ESPN family of networks, with games being shown on ABC, ESPN, and ESPN2. On-air personalities will call the games from ESPN's home campus in Bristol, Connecticut, with one reporter on location at IMG Academy. Ryan Ruocco, Pam Ward, Rebecca Lobo and LaChina Robinson, were announced as the announcers, while Holly Rowe will be the reporter at IMG Academy.

== Playoff qualifying ==
Seed	Team	Record	Clinched		
Seed	Team	Record	Playoff berth	Bye to Semis	Top Record
1	Las Vegas Aces*^{[note 1]}	18–4	August 29	September 12	September 13
2	Seattle Storm*^{[note 1]}	18–4	August 29	September 9	No
3	Los Angeles Sparks	15–7	August 30	No	No
4	Minnesota Lynx	14–8	September 1	No	No
5	Phoenix Mercury	13–9	September 5	No	No
6	Chicago Sky	12–10	September 1	No	No
7	Connecticut Sun	10–12	September 8	No	No
8	Washington Mystics	9–13	September 13	No	No

^note 1Las Vegas earned the first seed by virtue of winning the first tiebreaker over Seattle. Las Vegas lead the head-to-head matchups 2–0.

For the fourth straight year, five teams from the Western Conference qualified for the playoffs, while only three from the Eastern Conference qualified. However, this is the first season in the current playoff format where the top five seeds were all from the same conference. All eight teams that qualified were the same eight teams that qualified for the playoffs in 2019.

== Bracket ==
**First round** Single elimination (September 15)
5	**Phoenix Mercury**	**85**
8	Washington Mystics	84
6	Chicago Sky	81
7	**Connecticut Sun**	**94**

**Second round** Single elimination (September 17)
4	**Minnesota Lynx**	**80**
5	Phoenix Mercury	79
3	Los Angeles Sparks	59
7	**Connecticut Sun**	**73**

**Semifinals**; Best-of-5 (September 20–29)
1	**Las Vegas Aces**	**3**
7	Connecticut Sun	2
2	**Seattle Storm**	**3**
4	Minnesota Lynx	0

**WNBA Finals**; Best-of-5 (October 2–11)
1	Las Vegas Aces	0
2	**Seattle Storm**	**3**

Note: Teams re-seeded after each round.

- **Bold** – Game or series winner

== First round ==
=== Chicago Sky vs. Connecticut Sun ===
The first playoff game of 2020 saw the 6th seeded Chicago Sky play the 7th seeded Connecticut Sun. The higher seeded Sky had a tough end to their season, finishing 2–6 in their last eight games. The Sun came in as the hotter team finishing 4–4 in their last eight. The season series between the two finished 1–1.

The game was a tight one in the first half, with the game being tied at 41 entering half time. However, the Sun outscored the Sky by sixteen points in the third quarter and were able to pull away to a thirteen point victory. The Sun were led by Alyssa Thomas and DeWanna Bonner, who both recorded double-doubles. The Sun had a distinct advantage in rebounding in the game, out rebounding the Sky 40–21.

ESPN2, TSN1/4

September 15
7:00pm ET

Box Score

#6 Chicago Sky 81, #7 **Connecticut Sun** **94**
Scoring by quarter: 21–**22**, **20**–19, 11–**27**, **29**–26
Pts: Allie Quigley (19); Rebs: Cheyenne Parker (8); Asts: Alyssa Thomas (8)	Pts: Alyssa Thomas (28); Rebs: Alyssa Thomas (13); Asts: Courtney Vandersloot (6)

IMG Academy
Attendance: No In-Person Attednance
Referees: Michael Price
Eric Brewton
Tiara Cruse
Randy Richardson

=== Phoenix Mercury vs. Washington Mystics ===
In the second first round game the 5th seeded Phoenix Mercury faced off against the 8th seeded Washington Mystics. The Mercury finished 6–2 in their last eight games, but the two losses came in their last three games. The Mystics finished 5–3 in their last eight games, including a four game win streak that saw them secure the eight seed on the final day of the regular season. The two teams played on August 23 and 28 during the regular season, and the Mercury won both games.

The Mysitcs started the game strong, pulling out to a nine point lead in the first quarter. Their run continued and they extended the lead to eleven points at half time. The teams were even in the third quarter, which lead the Mystics to carry an eleven point lead into the final period. In the fourth quarter, the Mercury came storming back and won the quarter by twelve points to take the game. Both teams had scorers finish in double figures, including Shey Peddy who hit a three pointer as time expired to win the game. Peddy was cut by the Mystics in August.

ESPN2, TSN1/4

September 15
9:00pm ET

Box Score

#5 **Phoenix Mercury** **85**, #8 Washington Mystics 84
Scoring by quarter: 16–**25**, 19–**21**, 24–24, **26**–14
Pts: Skylar Diggins-Smith (24); Rebs: Brianna Turner (11); Asts: Diana Taurasi (6)	Pts: Leilani Mitchell (25); Rebs: Myisha Hines-Allen (9); Asts: Kiara Leslie, Emma Meesseman, Ariel Atkins, Leilani Mitchell (4)

IMG Academy
Attendance: No In-Person Attednance
Referees: Roy Gulbeyan
Byron Jarrett
Isaac Barnett
Fatou Cissoko-Stephens

== Second round ==
=== Minnesota Lynx vs. Phoenix Mercury ===
In the first game of the second round the 4th seeded Minnesota Lynx faced off against the 5th seeded Phoenix Mercury. The Mercury came into the game after winning at the buzzer on Tuesday. Minnesota came off a five day break after their regular season. The Lynx went 4–4 in their last eight games, winning the last game of the season after a three game losing streak. The two teams won a game a piece during the season series.

The game started out a close affair, with the Mercury leading by one point after the first quarter. They pulled ahead in the second quarter and went into halftime leading by nine points. The Lynx made a comeback in the third quarter, and the game was tied heading into the final period. Damiris Dantas missed two free throws with six seconds remaining to give Phoenix an opportunity for second buzzer beater in as many days. Skylar Diggins-Smith couldn't convert, and the Lynx won by a point. Dantas lead the Lynx with twenty-two points and Rookie of the Year Crystal Dangerfield scored fifteen of her seventeen points in the second half. Veteran Diana Taurasi lead the Mercury with twenty-eight points.

ESPN2, TSN5/NBA TV Canada

September 17
7:00pm ET

Box Score

#4 **Minnesota Lynx** **80**, #5 Phoenix Mercury 79
Scoring by quarter: 23–**24**, 14–**22**, **23**–14, **20**–19
Pts: Damiris Dantas (22); Rebs: Napheesa Collier (9); Asts: Napheesa Collier (6)	Pts: Diana Taurasi (28); Rebs: Brianna Turner (14); Asts: Diana Taurasi (9)

IMG Academy
Attendance: No In-Person Attednance
Referees: Eric Brewton
Tim Greene
Cheryl Flores
Randy Richardson

=== Los Angeles Sparks vs. Connecticut Sun ===
The second game of the second round saw the 3rd seeded Los Angeles Sparks matchup against the 7th seeded Connecticut Sun. The Sun came into the game off a strong win on Tuesday. The Sparks had a five day layoff after finishing their regular season. The Sparks went 4–4 in their last eight games, including losing the last two games of the regular season. The Sparks won both games of the regular season series.

The Sun came out strong, winning the first quarter by fourteen points and never looked back. The Sun won the first three other quarters and went on to win the game by fourteen. DeWanna Bonner scored a double-double for the Sun and Alyssa Thomas lead the team with nineteen points. The Sun had all five starters score in double digits. The Sparks only had two players score double digits and Candace Parker lead with twenty-two. She added fourteen rebounds to complete a double double.

ESPN2, SN360

September 17
9:00pm ET

Box Score

#3 Los Angeles Sparks 59, #7 **Connecticut Sun** **73**
Scoring by quarter: 8–**22**, 15–**17**, 17–**20**, **19**-14
Pts: Parker (22); Rebs: Parker (14); Asts: Parker (5)	Pts: Thomas (19); Rebs: Bonner (13); Asts: Thomas (6)

IMG Academy
Attendance: No In-Person Attednance
Referees: Roy Gulbeyan, Maj Forsberg, Billy Smith, Fatou Cissoko-Stephens

== Semifinals ==
=== Las Vegas Aces vs. Connecticut Sun ===
The Las Vegas Aces enter the semifinals as the number one seed. They finished the regular season 18–4 and won the tie-breaker over the Seattle Storm with a win in their matchup on the last day of the season. The Aces enter the playoffs with a 7–1 record in their last eight games and on seven days of rest since the final game of their regular season. The Sun enter after two solid performances in the first and second rounds of the playoffs. Their two wins came by thirteen and fourteen points. The teams met twice during the regular season, with the Aces winning both by double digits.

==== Game 1 ====
Game One started as a low-scoring affair, with the first quarter ending 14–10 in favor of the Sun. After a 22–15 Sun favored second quarter, the game went into half time with the seventh seeded Sun leading by eleven points. The Sun's dominance continued in the second half, and they won the game by twenty-five points. The Sun were led by Jasmine Thomas, who scored a career-high thirty-one points. Alyssa Thomas and Natisha Hiedeman also scored double digits for the Sun. The Aces only had two players in double figures, A'ja Wilson and Jackie Young.

ESPN, TSN2

September 20
1:00pm ET

Box Score

#1 Las Vegas Aces 62, #7 **Connecticut Sun** **87**
Scoring by quarter: 10–**14**, 15–**22**, 16–**28**, 21–**23**
Pts: A'ja Wilson (19); Rebs: A'ja Wilson (9); Asts: Angel McCoughtry, Sugar Rodgers (3)	Pts: Jasmine Thomas (31); Rebs: DeWanna Bonner (8); Asts: Alyssa Thomas (5)

IMG Academy
Attendance: No In-Person Attednance
Referees: Maj Forsberg
Tim Greene
Billy Smith
Randy Richardson

==== Game 2 ====
Game two was a back and forth affair, with the Sun winning the first quarter by two points, and then the Aces winning the second quarter by one point. Most notably, the Sun's Alyssa Thomas dislocated her shoulder. The Sun took a one point lead into halftime and expanded on that lead by winning the third quarter by three points. However, the Aces dominated the fourth quarter, winning by twelve points to erase the deficit and take the game by eight points.

The Sun were led by DeWanna Bonner with twenty-three points and Briann January with twenty points. The Aces were led by A'ja Wilson with twenty-nine points and three other players with eleven points. Neither team had a player record double digit rebounds. The Aces win ties the series at one game each, and ensures that there will be at least four out of the possible five games in the series.

ESPN2, TSN5

September 22
9:00pm ET

Box Score

#1 **Las Vegas Aces** **83**, #7 Connecticut Sun 75
Scoring by quarter: 21–**23**, **17**–16, 21–**24**, **24**–12
Pts: A'ja Wilson (29); Rebs: A'ja Wilson (7); Asts: Jackie Young (5)	Pts: DeWanna Bonner (23); Rebs: Beatrice Mompremier (9); Asts: Jasmine Thomas (4)

IMG Academy
Attendance: No In-Person Attednance
Referees: Roy Gulbeyan
Byron Jarrett
Tiara Cruse
Fatou Cissoko-Stephens

==== Game 3 ====
Game three started with the Sun winning the first quarter by a point and then carrying the second by five points, to take a six point lead into halftime. The Aces came out of halftime strong and won the third quarter by nine points, to take a three point lead into the final period. However, they could not hold on and were outscored by twelve points in the fourth quarter. The Sun's strong finish saw them win the game by nine points. The Sun only need to win one more game to secure a spot in the Finals.

The Sun were led by a strong night from Alyssa Thomas who returned unexpectedly from her shoulder dislocation. She scored twenty-three points and recorded twelve rebounds, both team highs, along with four assists and three steals. The Athletic called it one of the league’s greatest performances. The Sun had three other starters score in double digits, and two others record double digit rebounds. The Aces were again lead by A'ja Wilson, who had twenty points and twelve rebounds. However, only Angel McCoughtry and Danielle Robinson also scored in double digits for the Aces.

ESPN2, SN360

September 24
9:30pm ET

Box Score

#1 Las Vegas Aces 68, #7 **Connecticut Sun** **77**
Scoring by quarter: 18–**19**, 14–**19**, **24**–15, 12–**24**
Pts: A'ja Wilson (20); Rebs: A'ja Wilson (12); Asts: Jackie Young (7)	Pts: Alyssa Thomas (23); Rebs: Alyssa Thomas (12); Asts: Jasmine Thomas (6)

IMG Academy
Attendance: No In-Person Attednance
Referees: Michael Price
Eric Brewton
Cheryl Flores
Isaac Barnett

==== Game 4 ====
The first half was another close affair, with the Sun winning the first quarter by two points. The Aces won the second quarter by a point, so the Sun took a one point lead into halftime. However, the Aces came out of halftime strong and won the third quarter by twelve points. Despite the Sun taking the fourth by three, the Aces were able to close out a nine point win and force a deciding fifth game in the series.

The Aces had four out of fine starters score in double digits, lead by Angel McCoughtry, who scored twenty-nine. Danielle Robinson and A'ja Wilson scored eighteen each. The Aces bench was only able to contribute four total points and two rebounds. The Sun also had four of five starters score in double digits, and were led by Jasmine Thomas, who scored twenty-five points. The Sun's bench was also limited in the game, scoring just six points and contributing four rebounds.

ESPN, TSN2

September 27
1:00pm ET

Box Score

#1 **Las Vegas Aces** **84**, #7 Connecticut Sun 75
Scoring by quarter: 22–**24**, **15**–14, **28**–16, 19–**21**
Pts: Angel McCoughtry (29); Rebs: A'ja Wilson (13); Asts: Angel McCoughtry (6)	Pts: Jasmine Thomas (25); Rebs: DeWanna Bonner (15); Asts: Jasmine Thomas (6)

IMG Academy
Attendance: No In-Person Attednance
Referees: Roy Gulbeyan
Tim Greene
Billy Smith
Tiara Cruse

==== Game 5 ====
Connecticut started the fifth and final game of the series strong, winning the first quarter by thirteen points. However, the Aces responded in the second quarter, winning by seven. The Sun's six-point halftime lead was almost erased after the Aces won the third quarter by five points. The Aces won the fourth quarter by four to secure a three point win and a spot in the finals. The Sun only managed nine points in each the third and fourth quarters. A last minute pass came from Jasmine Thomas to DeWanna Bonner who failed to score, ending the Sun's season. This was the lowest scoring game of the series, with both teams scoring under seventy points.

The Sun only had two players score in double digits, and were led by Alyssa Thomas, who scored twenty-two points. They did have two players record double digit rebounds, with Brionna Jones recording twelve, and Thomas notching ten. However, the Sun's bench was only able to contribute five total points in the game. The Aces had three players score in double digits, lead by A'ja Wilson, with twenty-three. Angel McCoughtry added twenty. Three Aces players recorded double digit rebounds. No Aces bench player scored points in the game.

ESPN2, TSN1/4/5

September 29
7:30pm ET

Box Score

#1 **Las Vegas Aces** **66**, #7 Connecticut Sun 63
Scoring by quarter: 17–**30**, **22**–15, **14**–9, **13**–9
Pts: A'ja Wilson (23); Rebs: A'ja Wilson (11); Asts: A'ja Wilson, Kayla McBride (4)	Pts: Alyssa Thomas (22); Rebs: Brionna Jones (12); Asts: DeWanna Bonner (6)

IMG Academy
Attendance: No In-Person Attednance
Referees: Michael Price
Maj Forsberg
Byron Jarrett
Isaac Barnett

=== Seattle Storm vs. Minnesota Lynx ===
The Storm enter the semifinals as the second seed, finishing 18–4 for the season. They were tied with the Las Vegas Aces on overall record, but lost the tiebreaker during the final game of the regular season. The Storm finished 7–1 in their last eight games. The Lynx come in after holding off the Phoenix Mercury in the second round. The teams met twice in the regular season, with the Storm winning both by double digits.

==== Game 1 ====
Game one started as an even match with the Storm taking the first quarter by one point. They extended their lead to five points by halftime and nine points by the end of the third quarter. Then the Lynx mounted a comeback that fell just short as Alysha Clark made a layup as time expired to give the Storm a two point win.

All five starters for the Storm scored in double digits, with Jewell Loyd scoring twenty-five points and Breanna Stewart scoring twenty-one points. Four of the five Lynx starters scored in double figures, with Napheesa Collier leading the way with twenty-five. Both benches played a minimal role in the game, scoring a combined 22 points.

ESPN2, TSN5

September 22
7:00pm ET

Box Score

#2 **Seattle Storm** **88**, #4 Minnesota Lynx 86
Scoring by quarter: **22**–21, **28**–24, **22**–18, 16–**23**
Pts: Jewell Loyd (25); Rebs: Breanna Stewart (10); Asts: Sue Bird (8)	Pts: Napheesa Collier (25); Rebs: Napheesa Collier (9); Asts: Crystal Dangerfield (6)

IMG Academy
Attendance: No In-Person Attednance
Referees: Eric Brewton
Tim Greene
Cheryl Flores
Isaac Barnett

==== Game 2 ====
Game two started as a high scoring affair with Seattle taking a 26–23 lead after the first quarter. The Lynx only scored ten points in the second quarter, which allowed Seattle to take a thirteen point lead into halftime. The lead proved unassailable despite the Lynx winning the second quarter by seven points. Seattle closed the game out with a four point fourth quarter win and a ten point overall win. Seattle only needs to win one more game to secure a spot in the Finals.

Four of the Lynx five starters scored in double figures, lead by Damiris Dantas with twenty-three. Dantas and Bridget Carleton both lead the team with seven rebounds. The bench only contributed eight points. Four of the five Storm starters also scored in double figures, lead by Jewell Loyd with twenty. Breanna Stewart lead the team with eight rebounds and seven assists. The Storm bench scored twenty-one points.

ESPN2, TSN2

September 24
7:30pm ET

Box Score

#2 **Seattle Storm** **89**, #4 Minnesota Lynx 79
Scoring by quarter: **26**–23, **20**–10, 22–**29**, **21**–17
Pts: Jewell Loyd (20); Rebs: Breanna Stewart (8); Asts: Breanna Stewart (7)	Pts: Damiris Dantas (23); Rebs: Bridget Carleton, Damiris Dantas (7); Asts: Crystal Dangerfield (7)

IMG Academy
Attendance: No In-Person Attednance
Referees: Roy Gulbeyan
Tim Greene
Tiara Cruse
Randy Richardson

==== Game 3 ====
Seattle started Game three with a 24–12 first quarter and never really looked back. The Storm won the second quarter by three points to take a fifteen point lead into halftime. The Lynx managed to win the third quarter by two points, but lost the fourth quarter by eight points. The Storm won the game by twenty-one points to complete a three game sweep and earn a spot in the finals.

The Storm were led by Breanna Stewart who scored thirty-one points. The only other starter to score in double digits was Sue Bird, who scored sixteen. Five bench players scored thirty-two points for the Storm. Four of the five Lynx starters scored in double digits, lead by Napheesa Collier who scored twenty-two points. Collier also added fifteen rebounds to record a double-double. The Lynx bench only added seven total points.

ABC, TSN2

September 27
3:00pm ET

Box Score

#2 **Seattle Storm** **92**, #4 Minnesota Lynx 71
Scoring by quarter: **24**–12, **22**–19, 18–**20**, **28**–20
Pts: Breanna Stewart (31); Rebs: Alysha Clark (9); Asts: Sue Bird (9)	Pts: Napheesa Collier (22); Rebs: Napheesa Collier (15); Asts: Damiris Dantas, Odyssey Sims (4)

IMG Academy
Attendance: No In-Person Attednance
Referees: Michael Price
Maj Forsberg
Byron Jarrett
Isaac Barnett

== WNBA Finals ==
=== Game 1 ===
ESPN2, TSN1/4/5

October 2
7:00pm ET

Box Score

#1 Las Vegas Aces 80, **#2 Seattle Storm** **93**
Scoring by quarter: 21–**23**, 19–**34**, **27**–12, 13–**24**
Pts: Angel McCoughtry (20); Rebs: Carolyn Swords (12); Asts: McBride, Young (4)	Pts: Breanna Stewart (37); Rebs: Breanna Stewart (15); Asts: Sue Bird (16)

IMG Academy
Attendance: No in-person attendance
Referees: Eric Brewton
Billy Smith
Cheryl Flores
Isaac Barnett

=== Game 2 ===
ABC, SN

October 4
3:00pm ET

Box Score

#1 Las Vegas Aces 91, **#2 Seattle Storm** **104**
Scoring by quarter: 24–**31**, **18**–17, 26–**27**, 23–**29**
Pts: A'ja Wilson (20); Rebs: Angel McCoughtry (8); Asts: Danielle Robinson (10)	Pts: Breanna Stewart (22); Rebs: Natasha Howard (8); Asts: Sue Bird (10)

IMG Academy
Attendance: No In-Person Attednance
Referees: Maj Forsberg
Byron Jarrett
Tiara Cruse
Isaac Barnett

=== Game 3 ===
ESPN, TSN3/5

October 6
7:00pm ET

Box-Score

#1 Las Vegas Aces 59, **#2 Seattle Storm** **92**
Scoring by quarter: 21–**23**, 13–**20**, 14–**32**, 11–**17**
Pts: A'ja Wilson (18); Rebs: Carolyn Swords (10); Asts: A'ja Wilson (4)	Pts: Breanna Stewart (26); Rebs: Jewell Loyd (9); Asts: Sue Bird (7)

IMG Academy
Attendance: No In-Person Attednance
Referees: Michael Price
Eric Brewton
Cheryl Flores
Isaac Barnett
