= Jewell Loyd =

American basketball player (born 1993)

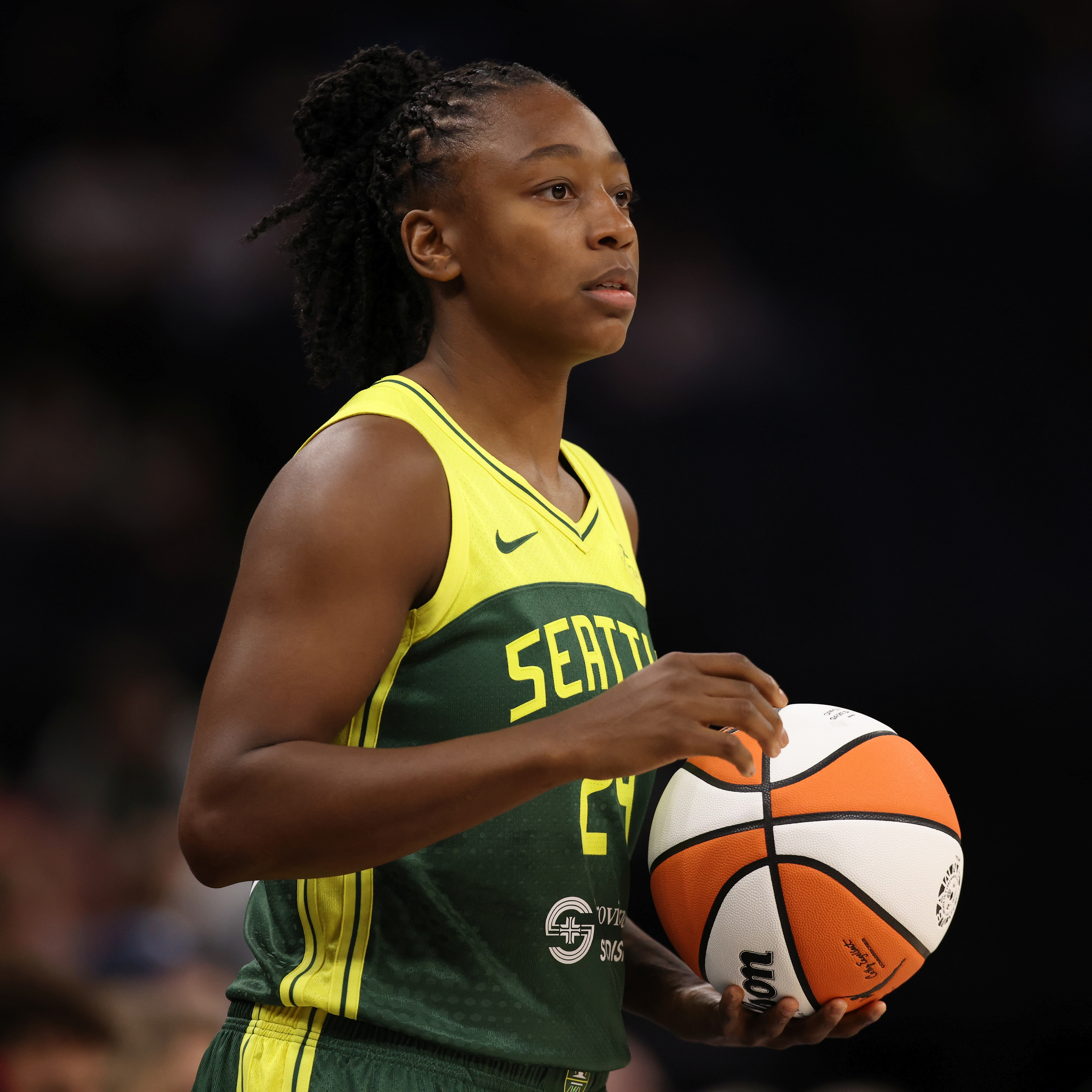
- Loyd with the Seattle Storm in 2024

No. 24 – Las Vegas Aces
- Position: Point guard / shooting guard
- League: WNBA

Personal information
- Born: October 5, 1993 (age 33) Lincolnwood, Illinois, U.S.
- Listed height: 5 ft 11 in (1.80 m)
- Listed weight: 175 lb (79 kg)

Career information
- High school: Niles West (Skokie, Illinois)
- College: Notre Dame (2012–2015)
- WNBA draft: 2015: 1st round, 1st overall pick
- Drafted by: Seattle Storm
- Playing career: 2015–present

Career history
- 2015–2024: Seattle Storm
- 2015–2016: Galatasaray
- 2016–2017: Shanxi Flame
- 2017–2018: Guri KDB Life Winnus
- 2018–2019: Botaş SK
- 2019–2020: Perfumerías Avenida
- 2025: Mist BC
- 2025–present: Las Vegas Aces

Career highlights
- 3× WNBA champion (2018, 2020, 2025); WNBA Rookie of the Year (2015); WNBA scoring leader (2023); 6× WNBA All-Star (2018, 2019, 2021-2024); WNBA All-Star Game MVP (2023); All-WNBA First Team (2021); 2× All-WNBA Second Team (2016, 2023); WNBA All-Rookie Team (2015); Commissioner's Cup champion (2021); WNBA Peak Performer (2023); 2× All-American – USBWA (2014, 2015); 2× WBCA Coaches' All-American (2014, 2015); First-team All-American – AP (2015); Second-team All-American – AP (2014); 2× First-team All-ACC (2014, 2015); 2× ACC All-Defensive Team (2014, 2015); USBWA National Freshman of the Year (2013); ACC Player of the Year (2015); 2× ACC tournament MVP (2014, 2015); Big East Freshman of the Year (2013); Big East All-Freshman Team (2013); McDonald's All-American (2012)
- Stats at WNBA.com
- Stats at Basketball Reference
Medals
Representing the United States
Women's basketball
Olympic Games
Gold medal – first place	2020 Tokyo	Team
Gold medal – first place	2024 Paris	Team
World Cup
Gold medal – first place	2022 Australia
Gold medal – first place	2018 Spain
FIBA Under-17 World Cup
Gold medal – first place	2010 France	Team
Basketball 3x3
Representing the United States
FIBA 3x3 World Cup
Gold medal – first place	2014 Russia	Team

Jewell Loyd (born October 5, 1993) is an American professional basketball player for the Las Vegas Aces of the Women's National Basketball Association (WNBA). Nicknamed the "Gold Mamba", she played college basketball at Notre Dame and was selected first overall by the Seattle Storm in the 2015 WNBA draft. Loyd won gold medals for the United States national team at the 2020 and 2024 Summer Olympics.

== Early life and college ==
Born in Lincolnwood, Illinois, Loyd was a four-year starter for Niles West High School in Skokie, Illinois, where she averaged 24.8 points and 11.9 rebounds per game and scored 3,077 career points, leading the team to a 93–31 record during that time.

In her final season for Notre Dame, she was named ESPN's women's college basketball player of the year as the Fighting Irish advanced to the NCAA championship game for the second year in a row. Loyd scored 1,909 points in her college career, Notre Dame's fifth-highest total ever.

== Professional career ==
=== WNBA ===
==== Seattle Storm (2015–2024) ====
Loyd was drafted first overall in the 2015 WNBA draft by the Seattle Storm. She played alongside superstar veteran point guard Sue Bird. Loyd played the point guard position before her WNBA career, but with Bird already playing point guard for the Storm, Loyd instead played as a shooting guard. Loyd was also a backup point guard in her rookie season for the Storm. While Bird sat out the final seven games of the regular season to rest, Loyd was the starting point guard. Loyd played 34 games with 23 starts in her rookie season for the Storm. Her season performance earned her the WNBA Rookie of the Year Award, while she averaged 10.7 ppg.

In her second season, Loyd developed into a star player and was the starting shooting guard for the Storm, averaging 16.5 ppg. During the season, Loyd scored a career-high 32 points in a win against the Phoenix Mercury. Loyd was also named to the All-WNBA Second Team. The Storm made it back to the playoffs for the first time in three years with the number 7 seed in the league. In her first career playoff game, Loyd scored 24 points in a 94–85 loss to the Atlanta Dream in the first round elimination game.

In the 2017 season, Loyd's offensive scoring numbers increased. She scored a new career-high of 33 points in a 75–71 loss to the Phoenix Mercury. By the end of the season, Loyd averaged a career-high 17.7 ppg. The Storm finished off the season as the number 8 seed in the league with a 15–19 record. The Storm were defeated 79–69 by the Phoenix Mercury in the first round elimination game. Loyd scored 17 points in the loss.

On July 20, 2018, Loyd scored a season-high 31 points in a 78–65 victory against the Connecticut Sun. In the 2018 season, Loyd was voted into the 2018 WNBA All-Star Game, making it her first career all-star appearance. Loyd finished off the season, averaging 15.5 ppg as the Storm finished 26–8 with the number 1 seed in the league, receiving a double-bye to the semi-finals and home court advantage. In the semi-finals, the Storm defeated the Phoenix Mercury in five games, advancing to the WNBA Finals for the first time since 2010. In the Finals, the Storm defeated the Washington Mystics in a three-game sweep, winning their first championship in 8 years.

On June 21, 2019, Loyd scored a season-high 23 points while tying a career-high 5 three-pointers in an 82–64 victory over the Los Angeles Sparks. Loyd would also make her second all-star appearance in the 2019 season. By the end of the season, the Storm were the number 6 seed with an 18–16 record. The Storm were unable to defend their title in the playoffs as they were eliminated in the second round of the playoffs by the Sparks.

In 2020, the season was delayed and shortened to 22 games in a bubble at IMG Academy due to the COVID-19 pandemic. On August 20, 2020, Loyd scored a new career-high 35 points in a 90–84 loss to the Indiana Fever. Despite the pandemic, the Storm had a fully loaded roster and finished 18–4 with the number two seed, receiving a double bye to the semi-finals. In the semi-finals, the Storm would sweep the Minnesota Lynx in three games, advancing back to the Finals for the second time in three years. In the Finals, the Storm would win the championship after sweeping the Las Vegas Aces, earning Loyd her second championship.

In 2021, she was named to the All-WNBA First team. Loyd averaged 17.9 points (seventh in the WNBA), 3.8 assists (12th), and 1.48 steals (seventh). On September 17 against Phoenix, Loyd scored a career-high 37 points – the most points by a player in a game in the 2021 season – and tied a league record with 22 points in a quarter.

In 2023, she led the WNBA in scoring with an average of 24.7 points per game.

==== Las Vegas Aces (2025–present) ====
On January 26, 2025, it was reported that Loyd would be traded to the Las Vegas Aces in a three-team trade. The trade was officially finalized on February 1.

=== Overseas ===
After her rookie WNBA season, Loyd played for Galatasaray in Turkey during the 2015–16 offseason. She averaged 14.9 ppg, 3.9 rpg, and 2.3 apg in 17 games. In August 2016, Loyd signed with the Shanxi Flame of the Chinese League for the 2016–17 offseason. In 2017, Loyd signed with Guri KDB Life Winnus of the Korean League for the 2017–18 offseason. In August 2018, Loyd signed with Botaş SK of the Turkish League for the 2018–19 season. In 2019, Loyd signed with Perfumerías Avenida of the Spanish League for the 2019-20 offseason.

=== Unrivaled ===
On July 13, 2024, it was announced that Loyd would appear and play in the inaugural 2025 season of Unrivaled, a new women's 3-on-3 basketball league founded by Napheesa Collier and Breanna Stewart.

== National team career ==
=== Senior national team ===
On June 21, 2021, Loyd was named to the 12-player roster for Team USA for the 2020 Summer Olympics. She and Team USA went on to win the gold medal in the tournament, defeating Japan 90–75 in the final.

In June 2024, Loyd was again named to the US women's Olympic team to compete at the 2024 Summer Olympics in Paris. The United States defeated France 67–66 in the final, earning Loyd her second consecutive gold medal and the United States' eighth consecutive gold medal.

== Personal life ==
Loyd announced her engagement to basketball player Natalija Marshall on September 2, 2026.

== Career statistics ==
Legend
GP	Games played	GS	Games started	MPG	Minutes per game	RPG	Rebounds per game
APG	Assists per game	SPG	Steals per game	BPG	Blocks per game	PPG	Points per game
TO	Turnovers per game	FG%	Field-goal percentage	3P%	3-point field-goal percentage	FT%	Free-throw percentage
**Bold**	Career best	°	League leader

†	Denotes seasons in which Loyd won a WNBA championship

=== WNBA ===
==== Regular season ====
WNBA regular season statistics
Year	Team	GP	GS	MPG	FG%	3P%	FT%	RPG	APG	SPG	BPG	TO	PPG
2015	Seattle	34	23	25.9	.411	.208	.904	3.5	1.9	.5	.2	2.0	10.7
2016	Seattle	34	34	31.6	.431	.303	.891	3.4	3.4	1.2	.2	2.2	16.5
2017	Seattle	34	34	31.1	.431	.386	.863	3.4	3.4	1.2	.3	2.5	17.7
2018^{†}	Seattle	34	34	29.7	.423	.370	.851	4.6	3.7	1.2	.1	1.9	15.5
2019	Seattle	27	21	25.4	.391	.337	**.928**	2.7	2.0	1.3	.1	1.9	12.3
2020^{†}	Seattle	22	22	27.9	.**443**	.**390**	.875	2.4	3.2	**1.5**	.3	1.9	15.5
2021	Seattle	31	31	31.0	.420	.376	.889	4.0	**3.8**	**1.5**	.2	2.3	17.9
2022	Seattle	36	36	30.3	.396	.385	.893	2.6	3.4	1.1	.2	2.2	16.3
2023	Seattle	38	**38**	**35.4**	.371	.357	.888	**4.7**	3.4	1.0	**.4**	2.8	**24.7**°
2024	Seattle	37	37	33.7	.360	.274	.881	4.5	3.6	1.4	.2	2.3	19.7
2025^{†}	Las Vegas	**44**	25	28.3	.389	.382	.831	3.2	1.8	1.2	.3	1.2	11.2
2026	Las Vegas	42	3	25.9	.365	.336	.796	2.3	1.4	1.0	.1	**.9**	8.0
**Career**	12 years, 2 teams	413	338	29.8	.399	.351	.879	3.5	2.9	1.2	.2	2.0	15.4
**Career**	All-Star	6	4	19.3	.364	.353	—	2.7	3.5	.2	.0	.7	8.7

==== Playoffs ====
WNBA playoff statistics
Year	Team	GP	GS	MPG	FG%	3P%	FT%	RPG	APG	SPG	BPG	TO	PPG
2016	Seattle	1	1	33.1	.444	.333	.833	4.0	2.0	.0	.0	**.0**	**24.0**
2017	Seattle	1	1	30.7	.286	.333	**1.000**	5.0	1.0	**3.0**	.0	2.0	17.0
2018^{†}	Seattle	8	**8**	30.7	.378	.241	.759	5.0	3.3	.7	.3	1.8	12.1
2019	Seattle	2	2	27.5	.455	**.556**	.889	2.0	3.5	1.5	.5	2.0	16.5
2020^{†}	Seattle	6	6	30.2	**.554**	.393	.933	**5.2**	3.8	1.3	.5	2.3	17.8
2021	Seattle	1	1	36.0	.208	.000	**1.000**	3.0	**5.0**	1.0	**2.0**	3.0	15.0
2022	Seattle	6	6	**37.0**	.389	.357	.929	2.3	2.5	.5	.0	1.0	19.2
2024	Seattle	2	2	29.5	.263	.333	.750	3.5	2.0	.5	.0	**.0**	7.5
2025^{†}	Las Vegas	**12**	0	29.3	.416	.413	.867	3.9	.8	1.0	.6	1.0	9.4
2026	Las Vegas	5	2	26.6	.400	.444	.667	3.0	1.0	1.2	.9	.8	6.4
**Career**	10 years, 2 teams	44	29	30.7	.406	.364	.863	3.9	2.2	1.0	.4	1.4	12.9

=== College ===
NCAA statistics
Year	Team	GP	Points	FG%	3P%	FT%	RPG	APG	SPG	BPG	PPG
2012–13	Notre Dame	36	450	.447	**.413**	.820	5.2	2.1	1.0	.3	12.5
2013–14	Notre Dame	37	687	**.517**	.398	.808	**6.5**	2.1	**1.6**	**.5**	18.6
2014–15	Notre Dame	**39**	**772**	.443	.308	**.826**	5.3	**3.0**	1.5	.4	**19.8**
**Career**		112	1909	.470	.367	.819	5.7	2.4	1.4	.4	17.0

== Awards and honors ==
- 2015—WNBA Rookie of the Year
- 2017, 2023—All-WNBA Second Team
- 2021—All-WNBA First Team
- WNBA Champion 2018
- WNBA Champion 2020
- WNBA Champion 2025

== See also ==
- List of WNBA career 3-point scoring leaders
- List of WNBA career free throw percentage leaders
- List of WNBA career free throw scoring leaders
- List of WNBA career scoring leaders
