= List of WNBA career scoring leaders =

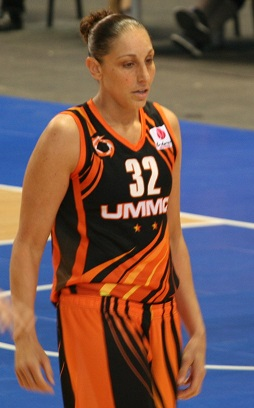
Diana Taurasi has scored the most career regular season points in WNBA history.

This article contains two charts: The first chart is a list of the top 50 all-time scorers in the history of the Women's National Basketball Association (WNBA). The list includes only points scored in regular season games. The second chart is a progressive list of the leading all-time WNBA scorers.

== Scoring leaders ==
Statistics accurate as of the 2026 season.

^	Active WNBA player
*	Inducted into the Naismith Memorial Basketball Hall of Fame
†	Not yet eligible for Hall of Fame consideration (Note: A player is not eligible for induction into the Naismith Memorial Basketball Hall of Fame until she has been fully retired for two calendar years.)
§	1st time eligible for Hall of Fame in 2027

Rank	Player	Pos	Team(s) played for (years)	Total points	Games played	Points per game (Note: Rounded to the nearest tenth.)	Field goals	Three-point field goals	Free throws
1	Diana Taurasi^{§}	G	Phoenix Mercury (2004–2024) (Note: Taurasi did not play the 2015 season at the request of her Russian Premier League team, UMMC Ekaterinburg.)	10,646	565	18.8	3,341	1,447	2,517
2	Tina Charles^{†}	C	Connecticut Sun (2010–2013, 2025); New York Liberty (2014–2019); Washington Mystics (2020–2021) (Note: Charles did not play the 2020 season due to the COVID-19 pandemic.); Phoenix Mercury (2022); Seattle Storm (2022); Atlanta Dream (2024)	8,396	473	17.8	3,364	197	1,471
3	DeWanna Bonner^	F	Phoenix Mercury (2009–2019, 2025–2026); Connecticut Sun (2020–2024); Indiana Fever (2025); Atlanta Dream (2026–present)	8,243	577	14.3	2,747	714	2,035
4	Nneka Ogwumike^	F	Los Angeles Sparks (2012–2023, 2026–present); Seattle Storm (2024–2025)	8,047	480	16.8	3,169	289	1,420
5	Tina Thompson*	F	Houston Comets (1997–2008); Los Angeles Sparks (2009–2011); Seattle Storm (2012–2013)	7,488	496	15.1	2,630	748	1,480
6	Tamika Catchings*	F	Indiana Fever (2002–2016)	7,380	457	16.1	2,385	606	2,004
7	Candice Dupree	F	Chicago Sky (2006–2009); Phoenix Mercury (2010–2015); Indiana Fever (2017–2020); Seattle Storm (2021); Atlanta Dream (2021)	6,895	494	14.0	2,842	30	1,181
8	Breanna Stewart^	F	Seattle Storm (2016–2022); New York Liberty (2023–present)	6,860	334	20.5	2,351	485	1,673
9	Cappie Pondexter	G	Phoenix Mercury (2006–2009); New York Liberty (2010–2014); Chicago Sky (2015–2017); Los Angeles Sparks (2018); Indiana Fever (2018)	6,811	416	16.4	2,446	464	1,455
10	Sue Bird*	G	Seattle Storm (2002–2022) (Note: Bird did not play the 2013 season and 2019 season because of knee surgery.)	6,803	580	11.7	2,479	1,001	844
11	A'ja Wilson^	C	Las Vegas Aces (2018–present)	6,792	308	22.1	2,466	123	1,737
12	Candace Parker*	F	Los Angeles Sparks (2008–2020); Chicago Sky (2021–2022); Las Vegas Aces (2023)	6,574	410	16.0	2,471	342	1,290
13	Katie Smith*	G/F	Minnesota Lynx (1999–2005); Detroit Shock (2005–2008); Washington Mystics (2010); Seattle Storm (2011–2012); New York Liberty (2013)	6,452	482	13.4	2,053	906	1,440
14	Sylvia Fowles*	C	Chicago Sky (2008–2014); Minnesota Lynx (2015–2022)	6,415	408	15.7	2,531	1	1,352
15	Jewell Loyd^	G	Seattle Storm (2015–2024); Las Vegas Aces (2025–present)	6,365	413	15.4	2,119	740	1,387
16	Lisa Leslie*	C	Los Angeles Sparks (1997–2009) (Note: Leslie did not play the 2007 season due to pregnancy leave.)	6,263	363	17.3	2,332	122	1,477
17	Brittney Griner^	C	Phoenix Mercury (2013–2024); Atlanta Dream (2025); Connecticut Sun (2026–present)	6,192	372	16.6	2,452	22	1,266
18	Kayla McBride^	G	San Antonio Stars/Las Vegas Aces (2014–2020); Minnesota Lynx (2021–present)	6,164	418	14.7	2,042	848	1,232
19	Lauren Jackson*	F/C	Seattle Storm (2001–2012)	6,007	317	18.9	2,090	436	1,391
20	Seimone Augustus*	F	Minnesota Lynx (2006–2019); Los Angeles Sparks (2020)	6,005	391	15.4	2,455	293	802
21	Kelsey Mitchell^	G	Indiana Fever (2018–present)	5,899	321	18.3	2,078	804	939
22	Becky Hammon*	G	New York Liberty (1999–2006); San Antonio Stars (2007–2014)	5,841	450	13.0	1,915	829	1,182
23	Angel McCoughtry	F	Atlanta Dream (2009–2019) (Note: McCoughtry sat out during 2017 to rest.); Las Vegas Aces (2020–2021); Minnesota Lynx (2022)	5,797	311	18.6	2,018	249	1,512
24	Skylar Diggins^	G	Tulsa Shock/Dallas Wings (2013–2018); Phoenix Mercury (2020–2022); Seattle Storm (2024–2025); Chicago Sky (2026–present)	5,758	354	16.3	1,908	451	1,491
25	DeLisha Milton-Jones	F	Los Angeles Sparks (1999–2004, 2008–2012); Washington Mystics (2005–2007); San Antonio Silver Stars (2013); New York Liberty (2013–2014); Atlanta Dream (2014–2015)	5,571	499	11.2	2,083	312	1,093

== Progressive list of scoring leaders ==
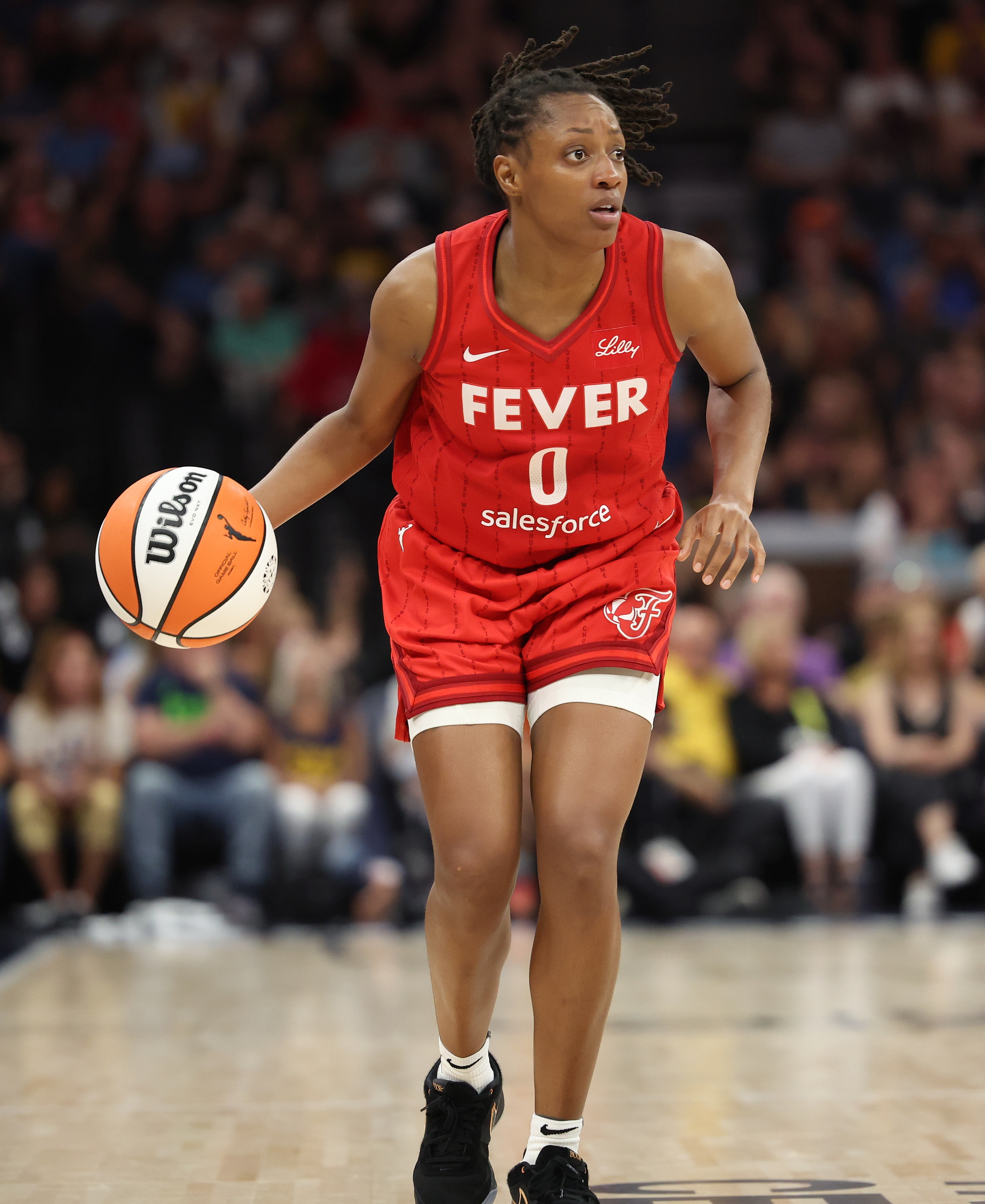
Kelsey Mitchell has scored the most points in a single season in WNBA history.

This is a progressive list of scoring leaders showing how the record increased through the years.

Statistics accurate as of the 2026 season.

^	Active WNBA player
*	Inducted into the Naismith Memorial Basketball Hall of Fame
^{†}	Not yet eligible for Hall of Fame consideration (Note: A player is not eligible for induction into the Naismith Memorial Basketball Hall of Fame until she has been fully retired for two calendar years.)
§	Eligible for Hall of Fame in 2027

Team abbreviationsTeam(s) listed is the one player was on when she established the record.
ATL	Atlanta Dream	HOU	Houston Comets	MIN	Minnesota Lynx	WAS	Washington Mystics
CHI	Chicago Sky	IND	Indiana Fever	NYL	New York Liberty		
CON	Connecticut Sun	LAS	Los Angeles Sparks	PHO	Phoenix Mercury		
DAL	Dallas Wings	LVA	Las Vegas Aces	SEA	Seattle Storm		

Scoring leader at the end of every season
Season	Year-by-year leader	Points	Active player leader	Total points	Career record	Total points	Single-season record	Points	Season
1997	Cynthia Cooper*HOU	621	Cynthia Cooper*HOU	621	Cynthia Cooper*HOU	621	Cynthia Cooper*HOU	621	1997
1998	Cynthia Cooper*HOU	680	Cynthia Cooper*HOU	1,301	Cynthia Cooper*HOU	1,301	Cynthia Cooper*HOU	680	1998
1999	Cynthia Cooper*HOU	686	Cynthia Cooper*HOU	1,987	Cynthia Cooper*HOU	1,987	Cynthia Cooper*HOU	686	1999
2000	Katie Smith*MIN	646	Cynthia Cooper*HOU	2,537	Cynthia Cooper*HOU	2,537	Cynthia Cooper*HOU	686	2000
2001	Katie Smith*MIN	739	Lisa Leslie*LAS	2,670	Lisa Leslie*LAS	2,670	Katie Smith*MIN	739	2001
2002	Tamika Catchings*IND	594	Lisa Leslie*LAS	3,193	Lisa Leslie*LAS	3,193	Katie Smith*MIN	739	2002
2003	Lauren Jackson*SEA	698	Lisa Leslie*LAS	3,617	Lisa Leslie*LAS	3,617	Katie Smith*MIN	739	2003
2004	Lauren Jackson*SEA	634	Lisa Leslie*LAS	4,215	Lisa Leslie*LAS	4,215	Katie Smith*MIN	739	2004
2005	Sheryl Swoopes*HOU	614	Lisa Leslie*LAS	4,732	Lisa Leslie*LAS	4,732	Katie Smith*MIN	739	2005
2006	Diana Taurasi^{§}PHO	860	Lisa Leslie*LAS	5,412	Lisa Leslie*LAS	5,412	Diana Taurasi^{§}PHO	860	2006
2007	Seimone Augustus* MIN	769	Tina Thompson*HOU	4,882	Lisa Leslie*LAS	5,412	Diana Taurasi^{§}PHO	860	2007
2008	Diana Taurasi^{§}PHO	820	Lisa Leslie*LAS	5,909	Lisa Leslie*LAS	5,909	Diana Taurasi^{§}PHO	860	2008
2009	Cappie Pondexter; PHO 2009; NYL 2010	648	Lisa Leslie*LAS	6,263	Lisa Leslie*LAS	6,263	Diana Taurasi^{§}PHO	860	2009
2010	Cappie Pondexter; PHO 2009; NYL 2010	729	Tina Thompson*; LAS 2010–11; SEA 2012–13	6,413	Tina Thompson*; LAS 2010–11; SEA 2012–13	6,413	Diana Taurasi^{§}PHO	860	2010
2011	Angel McCoughtryATL	712	Tina Thompson*; LAS 2010–11; SEA 2012–13	6,751	Tina Thompson*; LAS 2010–11; SEA 2012–13	6,751	Diana Taurasi^{§}PHO	860	2011
2012	Cappie PondexterNYL	695	Tina Thompson*; LAS 2010–11; SEA 2012–13	7,009	Tina Thompson*; LAS 2010–11; SEA 2012–13	7,009	Diana Taurasi^{§}PHO	860	2012
2013	Angel McCoughtryATL	711	Tina Thompson*; LAS 2010–11; SEA 2012–13	7,488	Tina Thompson*; LAS 2010–11; SEA 2012–13	7,488	Diana Taurasi^{§}PHO	860	2013
2014	Maya Moore*MIN	812	Diana Taurasi^{§}PHO	6,722	Tina Thompson*; LAS 2010–11; SEA 2012–13	7,488	Diana Taurasi^{§}PHO	860	2014
2015	Elena Delle Donne*CHI	725	Tamika Catchings*IND	6,947	Tina Thompson*; LAS 2010–11; SEA 2012–13	7,488	Diana Taurasi^{§}PHO	860	2015
2016	Tina Charles^{†}NYL	688	Tamika Catchings*IND	7,380	Tina Thompson*; LAS 2010–11; SEA 2012–13	7,488	Diana Taurasi^{§}PHO	860	2016
2017	Tina Charles^{†}NYL	671	Diana Taurasi^{§}PHO	7,867	Diana Taurasi^{§}PHO	7,867	Diana Taurasi^{§}PHO	860	2017
2018	Breanna Stewart^SEA	742	Diana Taurasi^{§}PHO	8,549	Diana Taurasi^{§}PHO	8,549	Diana Taurasi^{§}PHO	860	2018
2019	Brittney Griner^PHO	642	Diana Taurasi^{§}PHO	8,575	Diana Taurasi^{§}PHO	8,575	Diana Taurasi^{§}PHO	860	2019
2020	Arike Ogunbowale^DAL	501	Diana Taurasi^{§}PHO	8,931	Diana Taurasi^{§}PHO	8,931	Diana Taurasi^{§}PHO	860	2020
2021	Tina Charles^{†}WAS	631	Diana Taurasi^{§}PHO	9,174	Diana Taurasi^{§}PHO	9,174	Diana Taurasi^{§}PHO	860	2021
2022	Breanna Stewart^SEA	741	Diana Taurasi^{§}PHO	9,693	Diana Taurasi^{§}PHO	9,693	Diana Taurasi^{§}PHO	860	2022
2023	Jewell Loyd^SEA	939	Diana Taurasi^{§}PHO	10,108	Diana Taurasi^{§}PHO	10,108	Jewell Loyd^SEA	939	2023
2024	A'ja Wilson^LVA	1,021	Diana Taurasi^{§}PHO	10,646	Diana Taurasi^{§}PHO	10,646	A'ja Wilson^LVA	1,021	2024
2025	A'ja Wilson^LVA	937	Tina Charles^{†}CON	8,396	Diana Taurasi^{§}PHO	10,646	A'ja Wilson^LVA	1,021	2025
2026	Kelsey Mitchell^IND	1,086	DeWanna Bonner^PHO	8,243	Diana Taurasi^{§}PHO	10,646	Kelsey Mitchell^IND	1,086	2026
Season	Year-by-year leader	Points	Active player leader	Total points	Career record	Total points	Single-season record	Points	Season
