= Josefina Acosta de Barón =

Colombian composer and pianist (1897 – after 1945)

- Born: June 12, 1897; Bogotá, Colombia
- Era: 20th century

Josefina Acosta de Barón (June 12, 1897 – after 1945) was a Colombian composer, pianist, and teacher.

== Life and career ==
Acosta was born in Bogotá, and studied at the Academia Beethoven in that city beginning in 1905, taking lessons in theory, solfeggio, and harmony with Santos Cifuentes and piano with María de Cifuentes. Beginning in 1909 she took piano lessons with Eliseo Hernández and Honorio Alarcón, and lessons in harmony with Guillermo Uribe Holguín; these continued until 1912. In 1931 she traveled to Barcelona, where at the Academia Marshall she studied under Mass y Serracán and Manuel Burges. In 1917 in her hometown, she founded the Centro Musical de Chapinero, directing the organization until 1929. She also taught music at the Instituto Pedagógico Nacional and the Conservatorio Nacional de Música, both in the same city. From 1936 until 1945 she taught at the conservatory in Ibagué. As a composer, Acosta produced mainly works for her own instrument, although her output also encompasses some religious works. Her pupils included Oscar Buenaventura Buenaventura. The year of her death is unknown.
