= Guillermo Uribe Holguín =

Colombian musician (1880–1971)

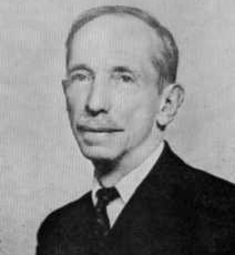
Guillermo Uribe Holguín

Guillermo Uribe Holguín (sometimes spelled Uribe-Holguín) (17 March 1880 – 26 June 1971) was a Colombian composer and violinist and one of the most important Colombian cultural figures of his generation. He composed prolifically in many genres and founded the National Symphony Orchestra of Colombia (previously the orchestra of the National Conservatory).

== Biography ==
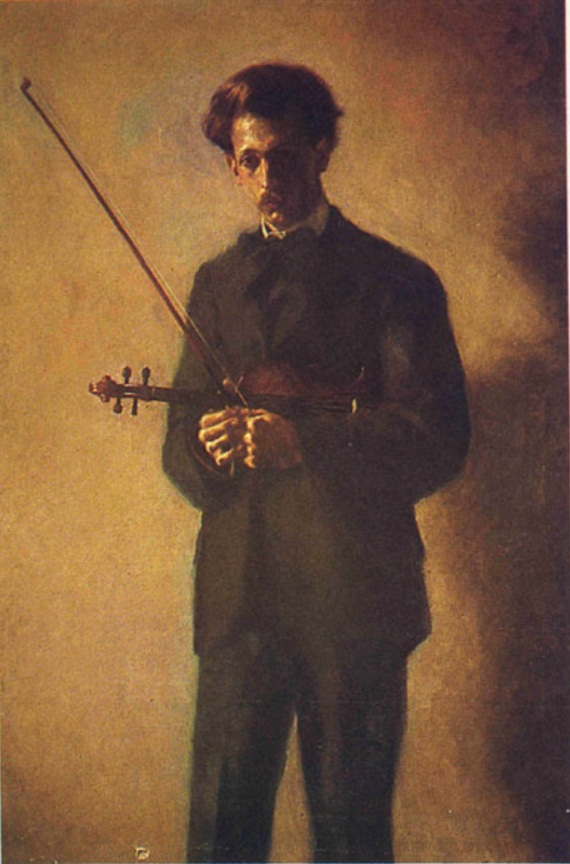
Guillermo Uribe Holguín

Uribe Holguín was born in Bogotá. His father was Guillermo Uribe and his mother Mercédes Holguín. While studying at the School of Engineering, he simultaneously studied violin with Ricardo Figueroa, and composition with Santos Cifuentes and Augusto Azzali, at the National Academy of Music. He became dissatisfied with his progress, and sought out a private teacher, Narciso Garay. He completed his engineering studies. In 1903 he visited New York City and for the first time he heard professional orchestras and opera. It was there that he started his series of 300 trozos, based on folk melodies, written for various instruments. In 1905 he was appointed professor of violin and harmony at the Academia. There, in December 1905, he conducted his Victimae Paschali for solo voice, chorus and orchestra.

He obtained a scholarship from the Colombian government to study in Paris. In 1907, at the Schola Cantorum, he commenced violin studies with Armand Parent, and composition with Vincent d'Indy, alongside fellow students Erik Satie and Joaquín Turina. He later took violin lessons in Brussels with César Thomson and Émile Chaumont. In 1909, his Violin Sonata No. 1 was played at a concert of the Société Nationale de Musique in Paris, by Gabriel Vuillaume and Ricardo Viñes. As a result of his Parisian studies, there is a marked French influence in the works he wrote prior to 1930. In Paris, he met the pianist Lucía Gutiérrez. They married in 1910, and she was often soloist in his works. She died in 1925.

In 1910 he returned to Colombia and became Director of the newly reorganized National Conservatory of Music in Bogotá. In 1932 the French government appointed him a Chevalier of the Légion d'honneur. He resigned from the Conservatory in 1935 in order to dedicate himself to composition. In 1939 he was decorated with the "Medalla Cívica del General Santander". In 1941 he produced an autobiography. He was reappointed director in 1942, a position he held until 1947. His final composition was Doce canciones, Op. 120, written in 1962. He died in Bogotá in 1971.

Since 2005 there has been a revival of his music by Colombian guitarist Nilko Andreas Guarin, who has been editing and promoting Uribe's works worldwide. Guarin performed the premiere in New York of Pequena Suite, Op. 80, No. 1, written for Andrés Segovia who never played it. He is working on a recording of never-performed music by Uribe Holguín including Violin Sonata, Piano Trio, one string quartet, songs, and guitar music.

Uribe Holguín's pupils included Josefina Acosta de Barón.

== Works ==
=== Opera and ballet ===
- Furatena, music-drama, Op. 76 (1940; lyric tragedy in 3 acts and 4 scenes)
- Tres ballets criollos, Op. 78

=== Choral and vocal ===
- Victimae Paschali (solo voice, chorus and orchestra)
- Requiem, Op. 17 (soloists, chorus and orchestra; written in memory of his wife, who had died in 1925)
- Marcha Triunfal, Op. 18 (tenor and orchestra)
- Himno, Op. 42 (tenor, chorus and orchestra)
- Improperia, Op. 65 (barítone and orchestra)
- Mass (children's à cappella choir and solo voices)

=== Orchestra ===
- 13 symphonies (including No. 2, Sinfonía del terruño, Op. 15)
- symphonic poem Bochica, Op. 73
- Tres Danzas
- Serenata
- Carnavalesca
- Marche funebre
- Marche de fête
- Suite típica
- Ceremonia Indígena (Himno a Zúa y danza ritual)

=== Concertante ===
- 2 Violin Concertos (Opp. 64 and 79)
- Concerto for viola and orchestra, Op. 109 (1962)
- Concierto a la Manera Antigua, for piano and orchestra
- Villanesca, for piano and orchestra

=== Chamber music ===
- 10 String Quartets
- 2 Piano Trios
- Piano Quartet
- 2 Piano Quintets (Opp. 31 and 66)
- 7 violin sonatas
- Sonata for viola and piano, Op. 24 (1924)
- 2 cello sonatas
- Divertimento for flute, harp, horn and string quartet, Op. 89
- Pequeña suite (Little Suite) for violin, viola and flute, Op. 96 (1955)

=== Piano ===
- 300 Trozos en el sentimiento popular (based on folk dances)
- many other piano pieces

=== Guitar ===
- Tres Bosquejos
- Suite in Three Movements Pequeña Suite, Op. 80 no 1(1946; written for Andrés Segovia), edited and premiered in the US by Colombian Classical Guitarist Nilko Andreas Guarin in New York City, 2005

=== Songs ===
- many songs, to words by Victor Hugo, Paul Verlaine, Charles Baudelaire, Henri Barbusse, Paul Fort and others.

== Sources ==
- Classical Composers Database
- Grove’s Dictionary of Music and Musicians, 5th ed.
- Don Michael Randel, The Harvard Biographical Dictionary of Music
- Gran Enciclopedia do Colombia (Spanish)
- Compositores Colombianos (Spanish; contains a biography and a list of his works).
