= 2011–12 Liga Femenina de Baloncesto =

2011–12 Liga Femenina season
- League: Liga Femenina
- Sport: Basketball
- Duration: October 2011–March 2012 (regular season); April 2012 (playoff)
- Number of games: 182 (regular season)
- Number of teams: 14
- Finals champions: Ros Casares Valencia
- Runners-up: Perfumerías Avenida

Liga Femenina seasons
- ← 2010–11 2012–13 →

The 2011–12 Liga Femenina de Baloncesto was the 49th edition of the Spanish premier women's basketball championship. It took place from 15 October 2011 to April 2011. Fourteen teams took part in the championship, with Caja Rural Tintos de Toro and Jopisa Ciudad de Burgos replacing relegated teams CB Olesa and Extrugasa, this one relegated due to financial problems.

Ros Casares defeated defending champion CB Avenida in the play-off's final to win its fourteenth and final title. Uni Girona and Baloncesto Rivas also qualified for the play-offs. On the other hand, Unión Navarra and CB Puig d'en Valls were relegated. However, Ros Casares was disbanded for financial reasons following the end of the season, and CDB Zaragoza, Joventut Mariana and RC Celta renounced to the category for similar reasons. The Spanish Basketball Federation consequently spared Unión Navarra and shortened the championship to eleven teams for the next season.

== Regular season ==
#	Teams	P	W	L	PF	PA	PT	Qualification or relegation
1	Ciudad Ros Casares Valencia	26	26	0	2253	1468	52	Qualified, subsequently disbanded
2	Perfumerías Avenida	26	23	3	2044	1640	49	Qualified for the Playoffs
3	Girona FC	26	18	8	1897	1749	44	Qualified for the Playoffs
4	Rivas Ecópolis	26	17	9	1807	1643	43	Qualified for the Playoffs
5	Mann Filter Zaragoza	26	16	10	1659	1584	42	Asked for relegation
6	Gran Canaria 2014	26	13	13	1705	1698	39	
7	Cadí La Seu d'Urgell	26	13	13	1707	1850	39	
8	Sóller Bon Día!	26	12	14	1840	1898	38	Asked for relegation
9	Jopisa Ciudad de Burgos	26	11	15	1768	1866	37	
10	Caja Rural Tintos de Toro	26	9	17	1760	1857	35	
11	RC Celta Baloncesto	26	8	18	1547	1781	34	Asked for relegation
12	Hondarribia-Irún	26	7	19	1672	1908	33	
13	UNB Obenasa Lacturale	26	5	21	1614	1910	31	Spared from relegation
14	Palacio de Congresos Ibiza	26	4	22	1518	1940	30	Relegated to Liga Femenina 2

== Championship Playoffs ==
Semifinals
1	Ros Casares Valencia	70	57
4	Rivas Ecópolis	61	47
2	Perfumerías Avenida	78	69
3	Girona FC	45	58

Finals
1	Ros Casares Valencia	74	86
2	Perfumerías Avenida	72	68
