= CB Puig d'en Valls =

Spanish basketball club

- Leagues: Liga Ibiza
- Founded: 1996
- Arena: Pabellón de Santa Eulària
- Location: Santa Eulària des Riu, Spain
- Team colors: Red
- President: Vicente Torres
- Head coach: Miguel Ángel Ortega
- Website: basketpdv.com
Home	Away

Club Bàsquet Puig d'en Valls, popularly known as Bàsquet PDV and also known as Palacio de Congresos de Ibiza for sponsorship reasons, is a Spanish women's basketball club from Santa Eulària des Riu, Ibiza.

== History ==
Founded in 1996, it played in the LFB between 2003 and 2012, when it was relegated to the Liga de Baloncesto de Ibiza.

Puig d'en Valls qualified for the championship play-offs in 2003, 2005 and 2008; in the latter it was 3rd, its best result in the regular season. In addition it reached the 2009 Copa de la Reina's final, lost to Ros Casares, and played the FIBA Eurocup in 2004, 2009 and 2010. On the other hand, this last season saw PDV ending last in the table, but it was spared from relegation by buying Real Canoe's spot. The team improved the following year, but it was finally relegated in 2012. Following the withdrawal of Joventut Mariana and Celta de Vigo in June Puig d'en Valls was offered a spot in the LFB, but the club turned down the offer due to financial strain.

== Season by season ==
Season	Tier	Division	Pos.	Copa de la Reina	European competitions	
2001–02	2	Liga Femenina 2	2nd			
2002–03	1	Liga Femenina	5th			
2003–04	1	Liga Femenina	12th		2 EuroCup	CQR
2004–05	1	Liga Femenina	8th			
2005–06	1	Liga Femenina	11th			
2006–07	1	Liga Femenina	10th	Quarterfinalist		
2007–08	1	Liga Femenina	3rd	Semifinalist		
2008–09	1	Liga Femenina	6th	Runner-up	2 EuroCup	R16
2009–10	1	Liga Femenina	14th (Note: Remained in the league after achieving a vacant place.)		2 EuroCup	R16
2010–11	1	Liga Femenina	7th			
2011–12	1	Liga Femenina	14th (Note: Relegated to fourth tier after not being admitted in Liga Femenina 2.)			
2012–13	4	Liga de Ibiza	1st			
2013–14	3	1ª División	1st			
2014–15	3	1ª División	1st			
2015–16	Did not enter any competition					
2016–17	3	1ª División	3rd			
2017–18	3	1ª División	1st			

== Trophies ==
- Copa de la Reina:
  - Runner-up: 2009
- Supercopa:
  - Runner-up: 2009
