= 2009–10 EuroCup Women =

- League: EuroCup Women
- Sport: Basketball

Regular season

Final
- Champions: (Greece) Athinaikos
- Runners-up: (Russia) Nadezhda Orenburg

EuroCup Women seasons
- ← 2008–09 2010–11 →

The EuroCup Women 2009–10 was the eighth of FIBA Europe's second-tier international competition for women's basketball clubs under such name, running from 11 November 2009 to 8 April 2010. Athinaikos AS defeated Nadezhda Orenburg in the final to become the first Greek team to win the competition.

== Preliminary round ==
=== Group A ===
#	Team	Pld	W	L	PF	PA
1	(Hungary) Győr	6	5	1	416	343
2	(France) Mondeville	6	5	1	464	350
3	(Switzerland) Sdent Sierre	6	1	5	400	439
4	(Portugal) Vagos	6	1	5	317	465

=== Group B ===
#	Team	Pld	W	L	PF	PA
1	(Spain) Islas Canarias	6	6	0	481	338
2	(Belgium) Namur	6	3	3	423	440
3	(Croatia) Medvescak	6	2	4	405	463
4	(Portugal) Olivais	6	1	5	392	460

=== Group C ===
#	Team	Pld	W	L	PF	PA
1	(France) Lattes	6	6	0	479	322
2	(Slovakia) Ruzomberok	6	3	3	408	394
3	(Lithuania) Klaipeda	6	2	4	369	452
4	(Portugal) Madeira	6	1	5	361	449

=== Group D ===
#	Team	Pld	W	L	PF	PA
1	(Poland) Polkowice	6	4	2	397	362
2	(Germany) Saarlouis Royals	6	4	2	464	427
3	(Spain) Puig d'en Valls	6	4	2	392	379
4	(Switzerland) Nyon	6	1	5	372	457

=== Group E ===
#	Team	Pld	W	L	PF	PA
1	(Spain) Zaragoza	4	3	1	293	222
2	(Poland) Energa Torun	6	2	2	264	283
3	(Croatia) Sibenik	6	1	3	241	293

=== Group F ===
#	Team	Pld	W	L	PF	PA
1	(Greece) Athinaikos	6	5	1	511	425
2	(Armenia) Yerevan	6	3	3	483	520
3	(Turkey) Besiktas	6	3	3	439	463
4	(Russia) Chevakata	6	1	5	484	509

=== Group G ===
#	Team	Pld	W	L	PF	PA
1	(Russia) Dynamo Moscow	6	6	0	506	350
2	(Bulgaria) Dunav Ruse	6	4	2	450	436
3	(Romania) Sepsi BC Sfântu Gheorghe	6	2	4	401	448
4	(Israel) Hapoel Tel Aviv	6	0	6	418	541

=== Group H ===
#	Team	Pld	W	L	PF	PA
1	(Russia) Dynamo Kursk	6	4	2	418	351
2	(Romania) MCM Târgovişte	6	4	2	423	390
3	(Cyprus) AEL Limassol	6	4	2	377	389
4	(Turkey) Samsun	6	0	6	320	408

=== Group I ===
#	Team	Pld	W	L	PF	PA
1	(Russia) Nadezhda Orenburg	4	3	1	324	272
2	(Turkey) Botas	6	2	2	316	331
3	(Romania) BC ICIM Arad	6	3	3	282	319

=== Group J ===
#	Team	Pld	W	L	PF	PA
1	(Serbia) Hemofarm	2	2	0	152	143
2	(Russia) Spartak Noginsk	2	0	2	143	152

=== Group K ===
#	Team	Pld	W	L	PF	PA
1	(Ukraine) Dynamo Kyiv	4	3	1	283	249
2	(Ukraine) Dnipro Dnipropetrovsk	6	2	2	261	251
3	(Bosnia and Herzegovina) Zeljeznicar Sarajevo	6	3	3	262	306

== Round of 32 ==
Team #1	Agg.	Team #2	1st	2nd
Botas (Turkey)	138–119	(Poland) Polkowice	74–50	64–69
BC ICIM Arad (Romania)	121–183	(France) Mondeville	68–84	53–99
Namur (Belgium)	138–119	(Germany) Saarlouis Royals	71–95	63–69
Zeljeznicar Sarajevo (Bosnia and Herzegovina)	133–155	(Serbia) Hemofarm	69–69	64–86
AEL Limassol (Cyprus)	168–142	(Bulgaria) Dunav Ruse	93–65	75–77
Spartak Noginsk (Russia)	119–144	(France) Lattes	61–67	58–77
Yerevan (Armenia)	134–160	(Russia) Nadezhda Orenburg	69–80	65–80
Sepsi BC Sfântu Gheorghe (Romania)	112–177	(Spain) Zaragoza	57–85	55–92
Ruzomberok (Slovakia)	119–174	(Romania) MCM Târgovişte	68–90	51–84
Sibenik (Croatia)	107–111	(Spain) Islas Canarias	62–40	45–71
Besiktas (Turkey)	141–188	(Russia) Dynamo Kursk	69–95	62–73
Klaipeda (Lithuania)	128–157	(Hungary) Győr	60–74	68–83
Energa Torun (Poland)	127–131	(Ukraine) Dynamo Kyiv	64–61	63–70
Medvescak (Croatia)	116–180	(Greece) Athinaikos	54–80	62–100
Dnipro Dnipropetrovsk (Ukraine)	114–132	(Spain) Puig d'en Valls	59–57	55–75
Sdent Sierre (Switzerland)	119–139	(Russia) Dynamo Moscow	61–62	58–77

== Round of 16 ==
Team #1	Agg.	Team #2	1st	2nd
Botas (Turkey)	146–153	(France) Mondeville	76–67	70–86
Saarlouis Royals (Germany)	155–149	(Serbia) Hemofarm	86–65	69–84
AEL Limassol (Cyprus)	123–110	(France) Lattes	72–52	51–58
Nadezhda Orenburg (Russia)	152–148	(Spain) Zaragoza	80–70	72–78
MCM Târgovişte (Romania)	147–133	(Spain) Islas Canarias	80–55	67–78
Dynamo Kursk (Russia)	170–100	(Hungary) Győr	85–56	85–44
Dynamo Kyiv (Ukraine)	122–138	(Greece) Athinaikos	56–57	66–81
Puig d'en Valls (Spain)	130–140	(Russia) Dynamo Moscow	63–70	67–70

== Quarter-finals ==
Team #1	Agg.	Team #2	1st	2nd
Mondeville (France)	133–122	(Germany) Saarlouis Royals	66–63	67–59
AEL Limassol (Cyprus)	125–137	(Russia) Nadezhda Orenburg	64–71	61–66
MCM Târgovişte (Romania)	130–133	(Russia) Dynamo Kursk	75–57	55–76
Athinaikos (Greece)	162–126	(Russia) Dynamo Moscow	84–60	78–66

== Semifinals ==
Team #1	Agg.	Team #2	1st	2nd
Saarlouis Royals (Germany)	107–143	(Russia) Nadezhda Orenburg	56–62	51–81
Dynamo Kursk (Russia)	125–137	(Greece) Athinaikos	64–71	61–66

== Final ==
Team #1	Agg.	Team #2	1st	2nd
Nadezhda Orenburg (Russia)	114–118	(Greece) Athinaikos	57–65	57–53
