= Nilko Andreas =

Columbian classical guitarist

- Also known as: Nilko Andreas Guarin
- Born: Colombia
- Genre: Classical
- Occupations: Guitarist; composer; singer; actor; music director; educator
- Instrument: Acoustic guitar
- Award: Lillian Fuchs Music Competition (2007)
- Website: nilkoandreas.com
- Education: National Conservatory of Music of Colombia; Manhattan School of Music

Nilko Andreas is a Colombian classical guitarist, composer, singer, actor, music director, and educator. He performs internationally as well as in New York City at venues such as Carnegie Hall and Lincoln Center. As an educator, Andreas has lectured worldwide, focusing on, but not limited to, Latin American composers.

== Early life and education ==
Nilko Andreas began playing music at the age of five, studying cello at the National Conservatory of Music in Bogotá, Colombia. He later transitioned to classical guitar and pursued advanced studies at the Manhattan School of Music in New York City, where he earned both Bachelor and Master of Music degrees in classical guitar, composition, and orchestral conducting.

== Career ==
Since his solo debut at Carnegie Hall in 2009 Andreas has performed as a soloist with numerous orchestras worldwide, including the Prague Symphony Orchestra, Shenzhen Symphony Orchestra in China, Surabaya Symphony Orchestra in Indonesia, "Mariuccia Iacovino" Orchestra and "Barra Mansa" Orchestra in Brazil, Baja California Orchestra in Mexico, Azlo Orchestra, Tactus Contemporary Ensemble, New York Chamber Ensemble, Rebow Ensemble of New York, Metro Orchestra in New York, and the WHCO.

In 2010, Andreas founded the "Amazonas" concert series at Carnegie Hall, aiming to raise awareness about environmental issues through music. He also serves as the artistic director of AZLO Productions, further showcasing his commitment to cultural and environmental advocacy.

== Collaborations and performances ==
Throughout his career, Andreas has collaborated with composers such as Alba Lucía Potes Cortés, Juan Pablo Carreño, Kevin Purcell, Juan Pablo Contreras, Ricardo Calderoni, Reinaldo Moya, Francisco Zumaqué, Juan Calderón, and Ricardo Llorca. He has participated in international festivals, including the Cooperstown Festival, Vale do Café, Festival do Inverno de Petrópolis in Brazil, Mannes Guitar Seminar, Long Island Guitar Festival in New York, "Wildthurn" in Munich, Germany, "Moment Musicaux" in Normandie, France, and Festival EAFIT in Medellín, Colombia.

== Acting and theater ==
In addition to his musical endeavors, Andreas has ventured into acting. Notably, he portrayed Don Quixote in the musical "Man of La Mancha" by Musical Theater Heritage. His passion for the work of Federico García Lorca led him to compose music for several of Lorca's plays, including "La Zapatera Prodigiosa." His collaboration with the Artificio Theater group received rave reviews and awards. He also conceived and directed "Asi Canta Federico," a musical theater portrait of Lorca's life and work.

== Educational Contributions ==
As an educator, Andreas has given master classes and lectures at institutions such as Columbia University, Mannes College of Music, New York University, Berklee School of Music, Alliance Française in Cartagena, Universidad del Norte and Bellas Artes in Barranquilla, EAFIT University in Colombia, Campos dos Goytacazes in Brazil, University of Jakarta in Indonesia, Redes 2025 in Tijuana, Mexico, and Sookmyung College of Music in Seoul, Korea.

In 2022, Andreas was introduced to the Volland Foundation and has returned multiple times, including the "Amazonas 2023" concert and most recently in 2025. He also participated in the "Behind the Curtain: An Artist Discovery Series" in November 2023, offering intimate performances and discussions about his artistic journey. His Amazonas concert series continued in 2025 with performances at Merkin and Carnegie Hall.

== Awards and Interviews ==
Andreas has won several awards including First Prize Lillian Fuchs Music Competition, Colombia Exterior Award 2007, First Prize Concert Artist International Competition Winner, Andres Segovia Award from the academy of Music in Bogota, and Recognition Award, given by the City of New York for an "Outstanding contribution to the Arts." He has been featured in various interviews and performances available online. Notably, he was interviewed for "Twilight Talks" with Kevin Moore in 2021 where he discussed his career and musical philosophy. A 2008 interview with CUNY TV discusses the convergence of his classical education with traditional Colombian music. Most recently an interview with Salon De Artistas details Andreas' passion for educating students around the world about Latin American music.

== Personal life ==
Andreas resides in New York City.
