= Honorio Alarcón =

- Born: 1859; Santa Marta
- Origin: Colombia
- Died: 1920 (aged 60–61)
- Occupation: Pianist
- Formerly of: Josefina Acosta de Barón

Honorio Alarcón (1859–1920) was a Colombian pianist. Born in Santa Marta, he trained in the conservatories in Paris and Leipzig in his early 20s. He won the Felix Mendelssohn Bartholdy award, and was recognized for his playing technique. He returned to Colombia in 1886, where he worked as music director and teacher. He eventually rose to leading positions in the Banda Nacional and the Academia Nacional de Música. His pupils included Josefina Acosta de Barón.
