= DeWanna Bonner =

American basketball player (born 1987)

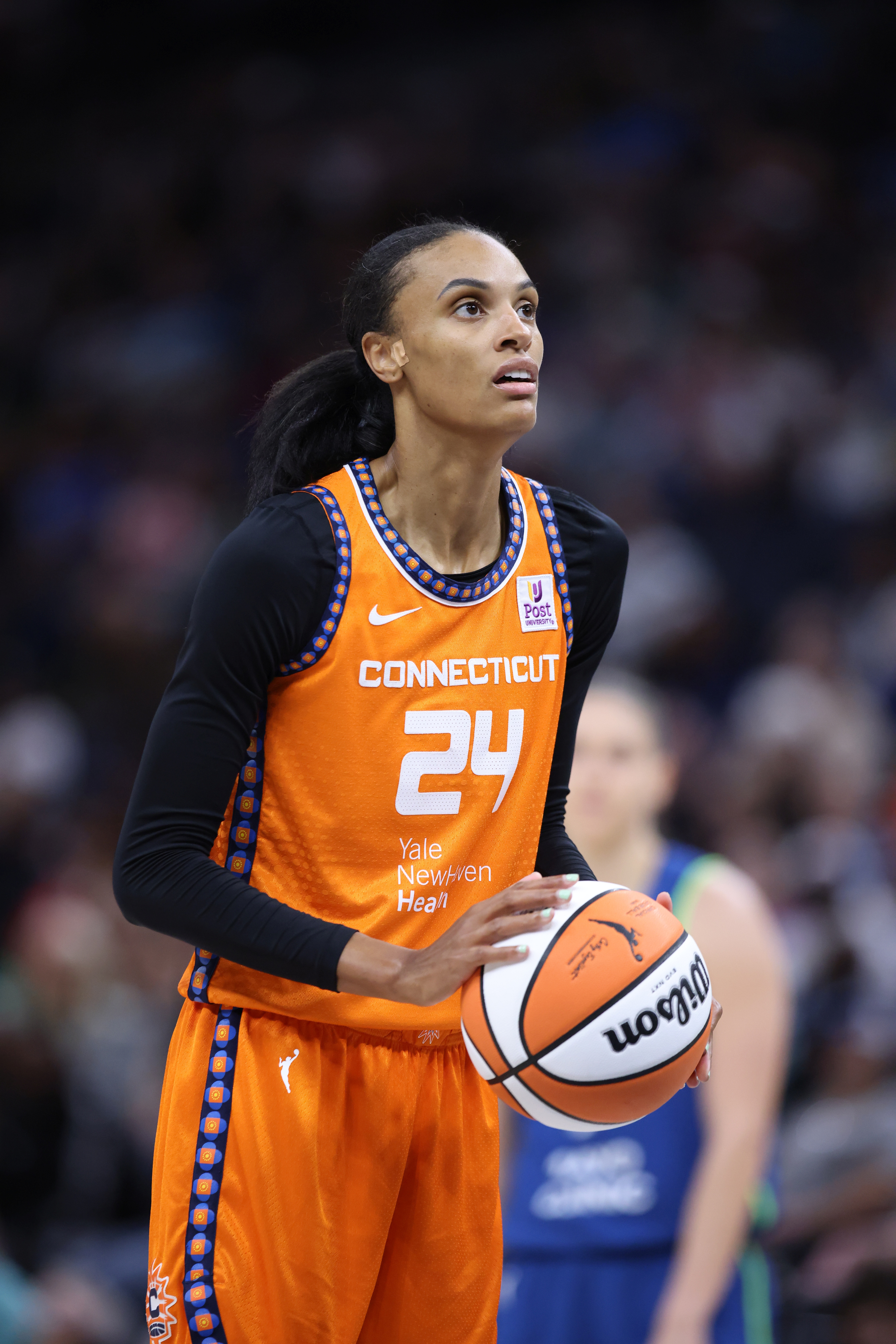
- Bonner with the Connecticut Sun in 2024

No. 24 – Atlanta Dream
- Position: Shooting guard / small forward
- League: WNBA

Personal information
- Born: August 21, 1987 (age 39) Fairfield, Alabama, U.S.
- Listed height: 6 ft 4 in (1.93 m)
- Listed weight: 140 lb (64 kg)

Career information
- High school: Fairfield (Fairfield, Alabama)
- College: Auburn (2005–2009)
- WNBA draft: 2009: 1st round, 5th overall pick
- Drafted by: Phoenix Mercury
- Playing career: 2009–present

Career history
- 2009–2016, 2018–2019: Phoenix Mercury
- 2009–2010: Basketbalový Klub Brno
- 2010–2011: Baloncesto Rivas
- 2011–2012: Perfumerías Avenida
- 2012–2016: Nadezhda Orenburg
- 2017–2018: USK Praha
- 2018–2019: Shandong Six Stars
- 2019–2020: Dynamo Kursk
- 2020–2024: Connecticut Sun
- 2021: Elitzur Ramla
- 2021: KSC Szekszárd
- 2022–2023: Çukurova Basketbol
- 2025: Indiana Fever
- 2025–2026: Phoenix Mercury
- 2026–present: Atlanta Dream

Career highlights
- 2× WNBA champion (2009, 2014); 6× WNBA All-Star (2015, 2018, 2019, 2021, 2023, 2024); All-WNBA First Team (2015); All-WNBA Second Team (2020); WNBA All-Defensive Second Team (2015); 3× WNBA Sixth Woman of the Year (2009–2011); WNBA All-Rookie Team (2009); State Farm Coaches All-American (2009); All-American – USBWA (2009); Second-team All-American – AP (2009); SEC Player of the Year (2009); SEC All-Defensive Team (2009); 3× First-team All-SEC (2007–2009); SEC All-Freshman Team (2006); McDonald's All-American (2005)
- Stats at WNBA.com
- Stats at Basketball Reference

DeWanna Bonner (born August 21, 1987) is an American professional basketball player for the Atlanta Dream of the Women's National Basketball Association (WNBA). Bonner played college basketball for Auburn University. After a successful college career at Auburn, she was drafted by the Phoenix Mercury with the fifth overall pick of the 2009 WNBA draft. She has won two WNBA Finals, been named WNBA Sixth Woman of the Year a record three times, and currently ranks third all-time in WNBA career scoring.

== Early life ==
Bonner was born on August 21, 1987 in Fairfield, Alabama, to LaShelle Bonner and Greg McCall. She has three siblings: sister Vin'Centia Dewberry, brother Justin McCall, and sister Erica McCall (with whom she shares a birthday).

Bonner attended Fairfield High School in Fairfield, Alabama. She was named McDonald's and WBCA All-American and participated in their All-America games. She earned USA Today Junior All-America and was the Gatorade Alabama Player of the Year while at Fairfield High School. She was featured in USA Today in 2005 as one of the nationwide Top 25 recruits.

== College career ==
Bonner went to Auburn University, where she earned a degree in psychology. She was named to the SEC All-Freshman Team. She scored double figures in 22 games during the 2005–06 season and led the Tigers with a 13.5 points per game average, the first time since 1980–81 that a freshman led the team in scoring.

In 2009, Bonner was named SEC Player of the Year and a National Player of the Year finalist, she broke the Auburn career scoring record during the Ole Miss game at the SEC Tournament. She finished her career with 2,162 points, nearly 100 more than the former school record. Bonner led the SEC in scoring that season, becoming the first Auburn player to ever earn the honor. She also ranked 10th in the country in scoring while setting the Auburn single-season scoring record with 716 points, 21.1 per game.

In 2009, she earned WBCA/State Farm, USBWA, AP and ESPN.com All-America honors and was voted the Alabama Sports Writers Association Amateur Athlete of the Year.

She finished her college career as Auburn's second all-time rebounder with 1,047, placing her among three Tigers with more than 2,000 points and 1,000 rebounds. At the time of her graduation, she ranked sixth in blocks, seventh in steals, first in free throws, fourth in field goals and tenth in three-pointers.

== Professional career ==
=== WNBA ===
==== Phoenix Mercury (2009–2019) ====
Bonner was selected fifth overall in the 2009 WNBA draft by the Phoenix Mercury. In her first regular season game with the Mercury, Bonner played 26 minutes and scored 16 points. She won a championship with the Mercury during her rookie season.

On September 12, 2014, Bonner won her second WNBA Championship with the Mercury, scoring 12 points, 9 rebounds and 3 assists in the clinching game.

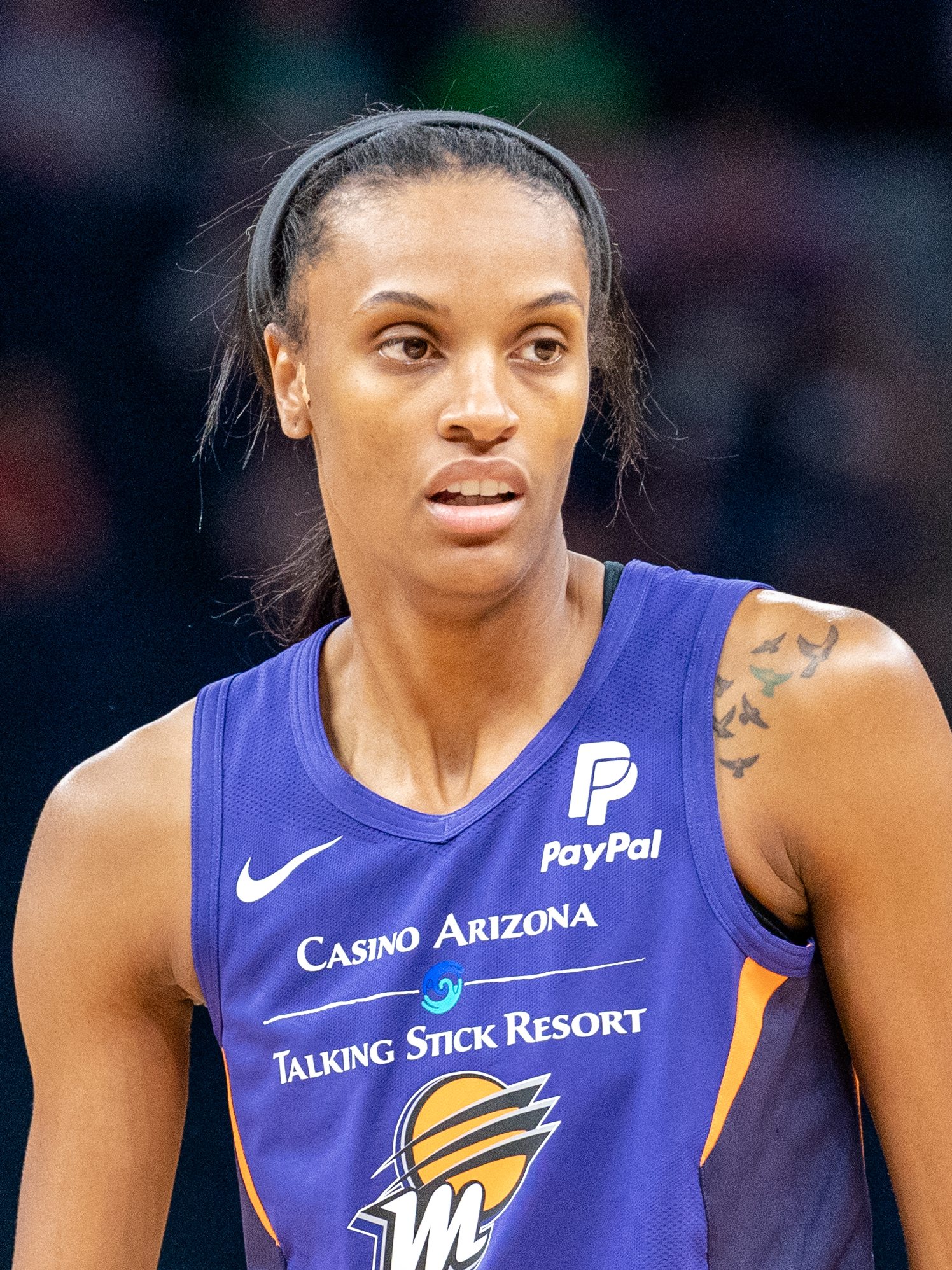
Bonner with the Phoenix Mercury in 2019

In 2017, Bonner sat out the season due to pregnancy. She returned to the team in 2018 and was voted into the 2018 WNBA All-Star Game. The Mercury made the 2018 playoffs as the fifth seed and were one game away from reaching the finals as they lost in five games to the Seattle Storm in the semi-finals.

==== Connecticut Sun (2020–2024) ====
On February 11, 2020, Bonner was traded to the Connecticut Sun in exchange for three first-round draft picks.

==== Indiana Fever (2025) ====
On February 2, 2025, Bonner signed a one-year contract with the Indiana Fever. On May 17, in her regular season debut for the Fever, Bonner became the number three all-time leading scorer in the WNBA, passing Tina Thompson. Bonner started the first three games of the season, but she came off the bench for the following six games (with Lexie Hull getting the starting nod). After the Fever's June 13 game, Bonner was listed on injury reports as unavailable due to "personal reasons." On June 24, it was reported by Annie Costabile from multiple sources that Bonner "[had] no interest in returning to play for the Fever." The next day, the Fever announced that they had waived Bonner, who in her own words stated she "felt the fit did not work out" and she preferred to play for teams such as the Phoenix Mercury or the Atlanta Dream. Fever general manager Amber Cox spoke to the press on June 26 and stated that Bonner expressed her dissatisfaction "nine, ten games [into the season]" and that equal trade opportunities were sought but no suitable trade options were found, which resulted in Bonner's being waived.

==== Return to Phoenix (2025–2026) ====
Bonner returned to the Mercury on July 8, 2025. She was described by the Associated Press as "instrumental" in helping the Mercury to qualify for the 2025 WNBA Finals, and was re-signed by the team in April 2026.

==== Atlanta Dream (2026–present) ====
On August 24th, 2026, after being officially eliminated from playoff contention, the Mercury announced they would buyout the remainder of Bonner's contract to allow her to become an unrestricted free agent. Bonner signed with the Atlanta Dream on August 27th.

=== Overseas ===
During the WNBA offseason, Bonner has played in the Czech Republic for BK Brno, Spain for Baloncesto Rivas and CB Avenida, and Russia for Nadezhda Orenburg.

== International career ==
Bonner joined the US women's youth team in 2006, winning the FIBA Americas Under-20 Championship for Women in 2006 and the FIBA Under-21 World Championship for Women the following year.

In March 2018, Bonner received a Macedonian passport and became eligible to play for the North Macedonia national basketball team. She played her first game for North Macedonia in 2021 as part of the EuroBasket Women 2023 qualification, scoring 11 points with 9 rebounds in a loss to Bosnia and Herzegovina.

== Career statistics ==
Legend
GP	Games played	GS	Games started	MPG	Minutes per game	RPG	Rebounds per game
APG	Assists per game	SPG	Steals per game	BPG	Blocks per game	PPG	Points per game
TO	Turnovers per game	FG%	Field-goal percentage	3P%	3-point field-goal percentage	FT%	Free-throw percentage
**Bold**	Career best	°	League leader

†	Denotes seasons in which Bonner won a WNBA championship

=== WNBA ===
==== Regular season ====
WNBA regular season statistics
Year	Team	GP	GS	MPG	FG%	3P%	FT%	RPG	APG	SPG	BPG	TO	PPG
2009^{†}	Phoenix	34	0	21.3	.457	.154	.812	5.8	.4	.6	.7	1.0	11.2
2010	Phoenix	32	4	25.4	.465	.358	.840	6.1	1.3	.6	**1.2**	1.2	12.0
2011	Phoenix	34	5	25.2	.430	.343	.909	7.0	.8	1.0	1.0	1.0	10.7
2012	Phoenix	32	32	**35.0**	.364	.283	.852	7.2	2.2	**1.7**	.8	2.3	**20.6**
2013	Phoenix	34	33	32.9	.410	.325	.901	5.8	2.4	1.1	.3	1.6	14.5
2014^{†}	Phoenix	34	34	29.2	.459	.279	.780	4.1	2.3	1.4	.4	1.3	10.4
2015	Phoenix	33	33	33.3	.378	.254	.866	5.7	3.3	1.3	.8	1.8	15.8
2016	Phoenix	34	24	31.3	.424	.329	.798	5.4	2.4	1.2	.6	1.6	14.5
2017	Did not play (pregnancy/maternity leave)												
2018	Phoenix	34	34	32.9	.452	.313	.867	7.2	3.2	1.2	.4	1.6	17.3
2019	Phoenix	34	34	32.9	.377	.272	**.916**	7.6	2.7	1.3	.6	1.6	17.6
2020	Connecticut	22	22	33.3	.422	.252	.895	**7.8**	3.0	**1.7**	.5	2.4	19.7
2021	Connecticut	32	32	31.9	.395	.317	.892	6.4	**3.5**	1.3	.7	2.2	15.2
2022	Connecticut	33	33	30.0	.439	.329	.827	4.7	2.8	1.2	.3	1.6	13.5
2023	Connecticut	**40**	**40**	30.1	.425	.329	.862	5.6	2.2	1.1	.6	1.5	17.4
2024	Connecticut	**40**	39	31.8	.415	.294	.832	6.0	2.0	1.2	.7	1.4	15.0
2025	Indiana	9	3	21.3	.345	.360	.895	3.8	1.6	1.1	.1	1.0	7.1
2025	Phoenix	24	1	24.4	.426	.326	.866	4.3	1.0	.7	.3	**.8**	10.9
2026	Phoenix	37	26	27.6	.394	.262	.848	6.1	1.5	1.2	.8	**.8**	10.6
2026	Atlanta	5	0	20.8	**.500**	**.467**	.800	5.4	1.8	.6	.0	1.0	8.6
**Career**	17 years, 4 teams	577	429	29.7	.415	.303	.857	6.0	2.2	1.2	.6	1.5	14.3
**Career**	All-Star	6	3	16.7	.444	.250	1.000	3.3	1.7	.2	.2	.2	6.5

==== Playoffs ====
WNBA playoff statistics
Year	Team	GP	GS	MPG	FG%	3P%	FT%	RPG	APG	SPG	BPG	TO	PPG
2009^{†}	Phoenix	11	0	16.9	.493	.000	.829	4.3	.3	.4	.5	.6	8.8
2010	Phoenix	4	0	22.8	.458	**.750**	.833	3.3	.5	.7	**1.8**	.7	7.5
2011	Phoenix	5	5	35.8	.348	.217	.857	9.4	1.2	1.4	1.2	1.6	12.6
2013	Phoenix	5	5	35.8	.333	.133	.857	5.2	3.4	1.2	.4	2.2	10.4
2014^{†}	Phoenix	8	8	35.8	.360	.333	.905	6.0	2.0	1.3	.6	1.7	11.3
2015	Phoenix	4	4	31.6	.451	.450	.933	6.0	2.5	.2	.7	2.7	17.3
2016	Phoenix	5	0	24.2	.426	.000	.824	4.2	1.6	1.0	.0	2.8	10.8
2018	Phoenix	7	7	**38.6**°	**.535**	.308	.909	**11.1**	2.4	1.6	.8	2.1	**24.0**
2019	Phoenix	1	1	33.0	.357	.667	.900	6.0	2.0	1.0	.0	2.0	21.0
2020	Connecticut	7	7	35.0	.333	.286	**1.000**°	10.4	**3.9**	**1.9**	1.1	2.6	15.4
2021	Connecticut	4	4	35.0	.404	.400	.909	7.0	1.3	1.0	**1.8**	2.8	13.5
2022	Connecticut	**12**	**12**	31.5	.341	.294	.886	5.8	3.6	1.5	.7	1.7	12.2
2023	Connecticut	7	7	36.9	.385	.365	.774	8.3	3.4	1.0	1.6	1.6	18.1
2024	Connecticut	7	7	33.4	.396	.378	.929	7.9	2.9	**1.9**	.6	1.4	16.0
2025	Phoenix	11	1	26.2	.400	.294	.750	6.8	1.0	1.0	.6	**.5**	9.1
**Career**	15 years, 2 teams	98	68	30.8	.401	.309	.874	6.8	2.2	1.2	.8	1.6	13.2

=== College ===
College statistics
Year	Team	GP	GS	MPG	FG%	3P%	FT%	RPG	APG	SPG	BPG	TO	PPG
2005–06	Auburn	29	—	31.4	.422	.303	.691	6.5	1.9	1.4	.6	2.6	13.5
2006–07	Auburn	32	—	29.7	.459	.286	.779	8.1	1.7	1.6	.9	2.6	15.1
2007–08	Auburn	31	—	**34.3**	.447	.277	.812	**10.0**	**2.1**	**1.9**	1.2	2.8	18.4
2008–09	Auburn	**34**	—	33.0	**.482**	**.339**	**.845**	8.5	1.5	1.7	**1.6**	**2.1**	**21.1**
**Career**		126	—	32.1	.456	.303	.795	8.3	1.8	1.7	1.1	2.5	17.2

== Personal life ==
In November 2014, she married fellow WNBA player and former Mercury teammate Candice Dupree. In April 2017, she announced she was pregnant and would miss the 2017 WNBA season. In July 2017, Bonner gave birth to twin daughters.

Bonner and Dupree split up, approximately in 2020. She became engaged in 2023 to former Sun and then Mercury teammate Alyssa Thomas, who proposed to Bonner during that year's All-Star weekend.

== See also ==
- List of WNBA career 3-point scoring leaders
- List of WNBA career blocks leaders
- List of WNBA career free throw scoring leaders
- List of WNBA career games played leaders
- List of WNBA career minutes played leaders
- List of WNBA career rebounding leaders
- List of WNBA career scoring leaders
- List of WNBA career steals leaders
- List of WNBA regular season records
