= Celta de Vigo Baloncesto =

Celta Vigo
- Leagues: Liga Femenina
- Founded: 1965/1996
- History: Club Estudiantes de Vigo; 1965–69; Celta de Vigo Baloncesto; 1969–88; CD Bosco; 1996–
- Arena: Navia
- Location: Vigo, Spain
- President: Francisco Araújo
- Head coach: Cristina Cantero
- Championships: 5 Spanish Leagues; 4 Spanish cups
- Website: celtabaloncesto.com
Home

Club Deportivo Bosco–Real Club Celta de Vigo Baloncesto is a Spanish women's basketball club from Vigo related to football club Celta de Vigo, that currently plays in the Liga Femenina (Spain's first division for women's basketball).

== History ==
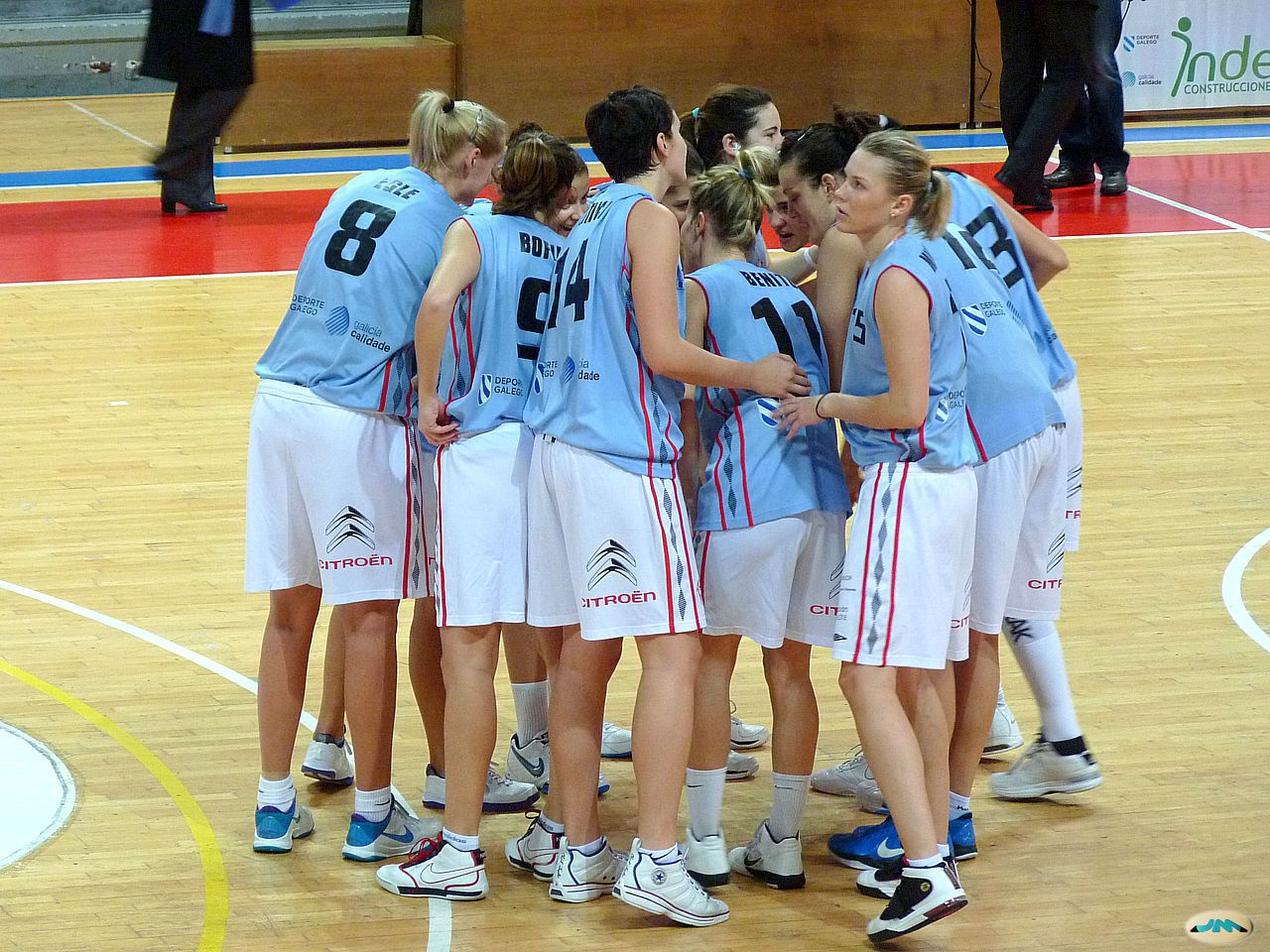
The players, during a match of the 2010–11 season.

The club was founded in 1965 as Club Estudiantes de Vigo and became a section of the local football club Celta in 1969. Celta Vigo won three national leagues and three national cups between 1977 and 1984 including a double in 1982.

The section was disbanded in 1988, but in 1996 it was refounded in association with CD Bosco. The new team's first seasons were very successful, winning two more leagues and a fourth cup between 1999 and 2001.

In following years, Celta became a mid-lower table team until 2012, when it resigned to play in the top tier due to financial strain, and joined the Liga Femenina 2.

In 2018, the club qualified for the promotion playoffs for the first time since their voluntary relegation, as champions of the Liga Femenina 2 Group A, but could not promote after failing in the last match.

== Players ==
=== Current roster ===
Note: Flags indicate national team eligibility at FIBA-sanctioned events. Players may hold other non-FIBA nationalities not displayed.

Celta de Vigo Baloncesto (Liga Femenina) roster
Players
Coaches

Pos.	No.	Nat.	Name	Ht.
F	00	(Mali)	Haidara, Maimouna	1.81 m (5 ft 11 in)
G	2	(United States)	Maxwell, Brynna	1.83 m (6 ft 0 in)
G	4	(Croatia)	Tadic, Matea	1.76 m (5 ft 9 in)
F	7	(France)	Samson, Clementine	1.81 m (5 ft 11 in)
F	8	(Canada)	Cooper, Samantha	1.89 m (6 ft 2 in)
G	11	(Spain)	Pujol, Ariadna	1.81 m (5 ft 11 in)
F	14	(Spain)	Moya, Laia	1.82 m (6 ft 0 in)
G	17	(Spain)	Gutiérrez, Lucía	1.73 m (5 ft 8 in)
F	21	(Spain)	Vidal, Sara	1.82 m (6 ft 0 in)
G	32	(Spain)	Salinas, Paula	1.69 m (5 ft 7 in)
F/C	35	(Latvia)	Sila, Luize	1.88 m (6 ft 2 in)

Head coach

- (Spain) Cristina Cantero

Legend

- (C) Team captain
- (DP) Development player
- (I) Import player
- Injured

- Roster
Updated: 13 September 2024

== Season by season ==
Season	Tier	Division	Pos.	Copa de la Reina	European competitions	
1996–97	1	Liga Femenina	6th	Runner-up		
1997–98	1	Liga Femenina	2nd	Semifinalist		
1998–99	1	Liga Femenina	1st	Quarterfinalist		
1999–00	1	Liga Femenina	1st	Semifinalist	1 EuroLeague	GS
2000–01	1	Liga Femenina	3rd	Champion		
2001–02	1	Liga Femenina	3rd	Semifinalist		
2002–03	1	Liga Femenina	8th	Semifinalist		
2003–04	1	Liga Femenina	5th	Quarterfinalist		
2004–05	1	Liga Femenina	5th	Quarterfinalist		
2005–06	1	Liga Femenina	12th			
2006–07	1	Liga Femenina	12th			
2007–08	1	Liga Femenina	7th	Quarterfinalist		
2008–09	1	Liga Femenina	9th	Semifinalist		
2009–10	1	Liga Femenina	6th			
2010–11	1	Liga Femenina	11th			
2011–12	1	Liga Femenina	11th (Note: Resigned to their place in the league.)			
2012–13	2	Liga Femenina 2	5th			
2013–14	2	Liga Femenina 2	5th			
2014–15	2	Liga Femenina 2	6th			
2015–16	2	Liga Femenina 2	9th			
2016–17	2	Liga Femenina 2	8th			
2017–18	2	Liga Femenina 2	1st			
2018–19	2	Liga Femenina 2	1st			
2019–20	2	Liga Femenina 2	7th			
2020–21	2	Liga Femenina 2	3rd			
2021-22	2	Liga Femenina Challenge	8th			
2022-23	2	Liga Femenina Challenge	4th (Note: Won promotion playoff and promoted to Liga Femenina.)			
2023-24	1	Liga Femenina	14th			
2024-25	1	Liga Femenina	TBD			

== Titles ==
- Liga Femenina (5)
  - 1977, 1979, 1982, 1999, 2000
- Copa de la Reina (4)
  - 1981, 1982, 1984, 2001
