= CDB Zaragoza =

Spanish basketball club

Basket Zaragoza
- Leagues: Primera División
- Founded: 2000
- Folded: 2013
- Arena: La Almozara
- Location: Zaragoza, Spain
- Team colors: Yellow
- Head coach: Víctor Lapeña
- Website: baloncestozaragoza.es
Home	Away

Club Deportivo Basket Zaragoza, a.k.a. Mann Filter Zaragoza for sponsorship reasons, was a Spanish women's basketball club from Zaragoza that played in the LFB. It was founded in 2000 from newly promoted CN Helios, which had previously replaced 1990 Copa de la Reina champion Banco Zaragozano.

Zaragoza has made it into the LFB's top four in 2002, 2003, 2010 and 2011, playing the championship play-offs in five occasions. In 2005 it reached the Copa de la Reina's final, lost to CB Avenida, and it has played the Eurocup in 2004, 2010 and 2011. Most recently Zaragoza was 5th in the 2011-12 LFB.

== 2011–12 Roster ==
- (1.96) (United States) Jacinta Monroe
- (1.93) (Slovakia) Romana Vynuchalová
- (1.92) (Bulgaria) Jaklin Zlatanova
- (1.89) (Spain) María Pina
- (1.87) (United States) Arhonda Covington
- (1.85) (Greece) Katerina Sotiriou
- (1.81) (Spain) Revuelto Sánchez
- (1.77) (Spain) Queralt Casas
- (1.77) (Spain) Estela Royo
- (1.76) (Spain) Blanca Marcos
- (1.70) (Spain) Cristina Ouviña

== Season by season ==
Season	Tier	Division	Pos.	Copa de la Reina	European competitions	
2000–01	1	Liga Femenina	12th			
2001–02	1	Liga Femenina	4th			
2002–03	1	Liga Femenina	3rd			
2003–04	1	Liga Femenina	8th		2 EuroCup	QR
2004–05	1	Liga Femenina	9th	Quarterfinalist		
2005–06	1	Liga Femenina	9th			
2006–07	1	Liga Femenina	11th			
2007–08	1	Liga Femenina	12th			
2008–09	1	Liga Femenina	13th (Note: Remained in the league by occupying one of the vacant places.)			
2009–10	1	Liga Femenina	4th	Semifinalist	2 EuroCup	R16
2010–11	1	Liga Femenina	3rd	Semifinalist	2 EuroCup	QF
2011–12	1	Liga Femenina	5th (Note: Resigned to its place due its huge financial problems.)			
2012–13	3	1ª División	4th			
