= Joventut Mariana CB =

Spanish basketball club

Joventut Mariana
- Leagues: 1ª Autonomica
- Founded: 1942
- Arena: Polideportivo Son Angelats
- Location: Sóller, Spain
- Team colors: White
- President: Alfredo Mainzer
- Head coach: Jorge Méndez
- Website: joventutmariana.com
Home	Away

Joventut Mariana de Sóller Club de Bàsquet, a.k.a. Sóller Bon Día! for sponsorship reasons, is a Spanish basketball club from Sóller, Majorca founded in 1942.

It is best known for its women's team, which played in the LFB between 2008 and 2012. Through these seasons in top-flight Joventut Mariana was a mid-table team, ranging between the 6th and 9th positions. In the 2012 LFB it ranked 8th with a 12–14 record. However, the season was marked by financial strain and on 19 June 2012 the club renounced to its spot in the LFB and retired from competition.

== Season by season ==
Season	Tier	Division	Pos.	Copa de la Reina
2002–03	2	Liga Femenina 2	4th	
2003–04	2	Liga Femenina 2	1st	
2004–05	2	Liga Femenina 2	2nd	
2005–06	2	Liga Femenina 2	2nd	
2006–07	2	Liga Femenina 2	2nd	
2007–08	2	Liga Femenina 2	1st	
2008–09	1	Liga Femenina	7th	Quarterfinalist
2009–10	1	Liga Femenina	9th	
2010–11	1	Liga Femenina	6th	
2011–12	1	Liga Femenina	8th (Note: Resigned to the place in Liga Femenina.)	
2012–13	3	1ª División	7th	
2013–14	4	2ª Autonomica	13th	
