= List of FIBA Europe women's club competition winners =

The FIBA Europe is the governing body for Basketball in Europe. It organises Three main Active club competitions for women: the Euroleague (formerly European Cup), the EuroCup Women, and the FIBA Europe Super Cup. there is also another former fiba Europe club competition for women such as the Ronchetti Cup Existed between the years 1972 to 2002. Former Soviet and present Latvian side TTT Riga have won a record total of 19 titles in FIBA Europe competitions, nine more than Spartak Moscow from (Russia). Spartak Moscow is the only team to have won all FIBA Europe women's club competitions.

The Soviet clubs have won the most titles (30), ahead of clubs from Russia (27) and Italy (22).

== Winners ==
=== By club ===
The following table lists all the women's clubs that have won at least one FIBA Europe club competition, and is updated as of 05 May 2026 (in chronological order).

Key

FEL	Euroleague
FEC	EuroCup
FSC	FIBA Super Cup
FRC	Ronchetti Cup(defunct)

Most in category

List of FIBA Europe women's club competition winners
Rk.	Club	FEL	FEC	FSC	FRC	Total
1.	(Latvia) (Soviet Union) Rīgas TTT	18			1	19
2.	(Russia) UMMC Ekaterinburg	6		4		10
3.	(Russia) Sparta&K	4	1	2		7
=	(France) Bourges Basket	3	2	1	1	7
5.	(Italy) Vicenza	5			1	6
6.	(Turkey) Fenerbahçe	3		2		5
=	(Czech Republic) (Czechoslovakia) USK Praha	2		2	1	5
8.	(Russia) (Soviet Union) CSKA Moscow	1			3	4
=	(Russia) (Soviet Union) Spartak Saint Petersburg				4	4
10.	(Turkey) Galatasaray	1	2			3
=	(Russia) Dynamo Kursk	1	1	1		3
=	(Bulgaria) Levski Sofia	1			2	3
=	(Russia) Dynamo Moscow		3			3
=	(Italy) Famila Basket Schio		1		2	3
=	(Russia) (Soviet Union) Spartak Noginsk				3	3
=	(Italy) Basket Parma				3	3
17.	(Bulgaria) Slavia Sofia	2				2
=	(Spain) Pool Getafe	2				2
=	(Italy) Pool Comense 1872	2				2
=	(Slovakia) Ružomberok	2				2
=	(France) Valenciennes Olympic	2				2
=	(Spain) Avenida	1		1		2
=	(Italy) Ahena Cesena	1			1	2
=	(Hungary) Sopron Basket	1			1	2
=	(France) Villeneuve-d'Ascq		2			2
=	(Spain) Valencia Basket		1	1		2
27.	(Czech Republic) (Czechoslovakia) Sparta Praha	1				1
=	(Italy) GEAS Basket	1				1
=	(Serbia) (Socialist Federal Republic of Yugoslavia) Crvena zvezda	1				1
=	(Italy) FIAT	1				1
=	(Bosnia and Herzegovina) (Socialist Federal Republic of Yugoslavia) Jedinstvo Tuzla	1				1
=	(Italy) Nuova Trogylos Priolo	1				1
=	(Germany) Wuppertal Wings	1				1
=	(Czech Republic) Brno	1				1
=	(Spain) Ros Casares Valencia	1				1
=	(France) Pays d'Aix Basket 13		1			1
=	(Russia) Baltiyskaia Zvezda Saint Petersburg		1			1
=	(Italy) Napoli Basket Vomero		1			1
=	(Greece) Athinaikos		1			1
=	(Israel) Elitzur Ramla		1			1
=	(Turkey) Yakın Doğu Üniversitesi		1			1
=	(Turkey) Çukurova Basketbol		1			1
=	(Russia) Nadezhda Orenburg		1			1
=	(France) ASVEL		1			1
=	(United Kingdom) London Lions		1			1
=	(Croatia) (Socialist Federal Republic of Yugoslavia) Trešnjevka				1	1
=	(Hungary) BSE Budapest				1	1
=	(Italy) SS Roma				1	1
=	(Russia) (Soviet Union) Dynamo Novosibirsk				1	1
=	(Ukraine) (Soviet Union) Dynamo Kyiv				1	1
=	(Italy) Basket Femminile Milano				1	1
=	(France) Tarbes Gespe Bigorre				1	1
=	(Spain) Islas Canarias				1	1

=== By country ===
The following table lists all the countries whose clubs have won at least one FIBA Europe competition, and is updated as of 05 May, 2026 (in chronological order).

Key

FEL	Euroleague
FEC	EuroCup
FSC	FIBA Super Cup
FRC	Ronchetti Cup (defunct)

Most in category

List of FIBA Europe women's club competition winners by country
Rk.	Nation	FEL	FEC	FSC	FRC	Total
1.	Soviet Union	18			12	30
2.	Russia	12	7	7	1	27
3.	Italy	11	2		9	22
4.	France	5	6	1	2	14
5.	Turkey	4	4	2		10
6.	Spain	4	1	2	1	8
7.	Bulgaria	3			2	5
=	Czech Republic	3		2		5
9.	Yugoslavia	2			1	3
=	Hungary	1			2	3
11.	Slovakia	2				2
=	Czechoslovakia	1			1	2
13.	Germany	1				1
=	Greece		1			1
=	Israel		1			1
=	United Kingdom		1			1

== See also ==
- FIBA Europe
