= 1990–91 Ronchetti Cup =

The 1990–91 Ronchetti Cup was the 20th edition of FIBA Europe's second-tier competition for women's basketball clubs, running from 26 September 1990 to 27 March 1991. For the second time the final confronted two teams from the sam country, with Gemeaz Milano beating Pool Comense to become the third team to win the competition.

== Qualifying round ==
Team #1	Agg.	Team #2	1st	2nd
Challes (France)	217–85	Sporting Luxembourg	119–47	98–38
Madeira (Portugal)	99–178	(France) Aix	54–83	45–95
Tortosa (Spain)	178–106	(Portugal) Porto	103–48	75–58
Brisaspor (Turkey)	144–205	(Romania) Metalul Rm. Valcea	80–108	64–97
Huboldt Universität (Germany)	138–165	(Belgium) Saint Servais	69–74	69–91
Vointa Brasov (Romania)	166–98	(Israel) Bnei Yehuda	76–50	90–48
Orchies (France)	189–175	(Germany) Munich	85–90	104–85
Lech Poznan (Poland)	114–173	(Spain) Godella	59–83	55–90
Istanbul USBK (Turkey)	108–176	(Hungary) Budapesti SE	45–95	63–81
Lokomotiv Sofia (Bulgaria)	139–136	(Hungary) Tungsram Budapest	66–52	73–84
Sheffield Steelers (United Kingdom)	141–160	(Spain) Donostia	71–80	70–80
MENT Thessaloniki (Greece)	152–167	(Bulgaria) Levski Sofia	83–85	69–82
Osiris Denderleeuw (Belgium)	106–172	(Germany) Wüppertal	56–77	50–95
Minyor Pernik (Bulgaria)	149–182	(Hungary) MTK Budapest	68–82	81–100
Yükselis (Turkey)	142–164	(Socialist Federal Republic of Yugoslavia) Zeljeznicar Sarajevo	68–83	74–81
Södertälje (Sweden)	157–161	(Czech Republic) Ruzomberok	79–78	78–83
Kremikovtsi (Bulgaria)	108–146	(Soviet Union) Dynamo Volgograd	58–71	50–75
Sportul Studentesc (Romania)	138–150	(Soviet Union) Spartak Moscow	68–75	50–75
Vantaa (Finland)	139–153	(Poland) Stal Brzeg	63–70	76–83

== Round of 32 ==
Team #1	Agg.	Team #2	1st	2nd
Challes (France)	133–141	(Italy) Libertas Trogylos	83–75	50–66
Aix (France)	178–134	(Spain) Zaragoza	96–61	82–73
Tortosa (Spain)	142–190	(Italy) Pool Comense	82–102	60–88
Metalul Rm. Valcea (Romania)	106–162	(Italy) Milano	62–74	44–88
Saint Servais (Belgium)	123–166	(Italy) Vicenza	70–83	53–83
Vointa Brasov (Romania)	128–173	(Soviet Union) CSKA Moscow	68–83	60–90
Orchies (France)	178–134	(Czech Republic) Slavia Prague	82–61	68–75
Apollon Kalamarias (Greece)	114–223	(Spain) Godella	67–107	47–116
Budapesti SE (Hungary)	105–109	(France) Paris Racing	69–50	36–59
Lokomotiv Sofia (Bulgaria)	124–121	(Socialist Federal Republic of Yugoslavia) Montmontaza Zagreb	73–72	51–49
Donostia (Spain)	177–171	(Socialist Federal Republic of Yugoslavia) Sibenik	108–85	69–86
Levski Sofia (Bulgaria)	129–140	(Soviet Union) Moldova Chisinau	71–74	58–66
Wüppertal (Germany)	150–171	(Socialist Federal Republic of Yugoslavia) Crvena Zvezda	77–88	73–83
MTK Budapest (Hungary)	154–172	(Socialist Federal Republic of Yugoslavia) Zeljeznicar Sarajevo	77–86	77–86
Ruzomberok (Czech Republic)	146–160	(Soviet Union) Dynamo Volgograd	74–69	72–91
Spartak Moscow (Soviet Union)	210–170	(Poland) Stal Brzeg	101–73	109–97

== Group stage ==
=== Group A ===
Team	Pld	W	L	PF	PA
(Italy) Milano	6	6	0	450	417
(France) Orchies	6	3	3	439	401
(Soviet Union) Moldova Chisinau	6	3	3	433	416
(Socialist Federal Republic of Yugoslavia) Zeljeznicar Sarajevo	6	0	6	449	537

=== Group B ===
Team	Pld	W	L	PF	PA
(Spain) Godella	6	6	0	479	379
(Italy) Libertas Trogylos	6	3	3	449	418
(Soviet Union) Dynamo Volgograd	6	2	4	452	476
(Bulgaria) Lokomotiv Sofia	6	1	5	420	527

=== Group C ===
Team	Pld	W	L	PF	PA
(Soviet Union) CSKA Moscow	6	4	2	475	438
(Italy) Vicenza	6	4	2	468	437
(Socialist Federal Republic of Yugoslavia) Crvena Zvezda	6	4	2	447	452
(France) Paris Racing	6	0	6	384	487

=== Group D ===
Team	Pld	W	L	PF	PA
(Italy) Pool Comense	6	5	1	520	396
(Soviet Union) Spartak Moscow	6	5	1	556	475
(France) Aix	6	2	4	483	493
(Spain) Donostia	6	0	6	388	583

== Semifinals ==
Team #1	Agg.	Team #2	1st	2nd
CSKA Moscow (Soviet Union)	152–158	(Italy) Gemeaz Milano	78–74	74–84
Godella (Spain)	126–130	(Italy) Pool Comense	70–57	56–73

== Final ==
Team #1	Agg.	Team #2	1st	2nd
Gemeaz Milano (Italy)	152–145	(Italy) Pool Comense	94–76	58–69
