= 1988–89 Ronchetti Cup =

The 1988–89 Ronchetti Cup was the 18th edition of FIBA Europe's second-tier competition for women's basketball clubs, running from 12 October 1988 to 22 March 1989. CSKA Moscow defeated Deborah Milan in the final to win its second title. It was the last of five editions in a row won by Soviet clubs.

== Qualifying round ==
Team #1	Agg.	Team #2	1st	2nd
Stockport Lapwings (United Kingdom)	109–184	(France) La Gerbe Montceau	55–103	54–81
Maccabi Tel Aviv (Israel)	125–112	(Greece) Aghias	82–63	43–49
Sparta Bertrange (Luxembourg)	?	(Spain) Toledo 92	52–94	?
Visby (Sweden)	108–114	(Poland) Wisla Krakow	67–52	41–62
Welheim (Germany)	164–151	(Switzerland) Nyon	77–83	87–68
Apollon Kalamarias (Greece)	123–209	(Hungary) Tungsram Budapest	64–91	59–118
Vointa Bucharest (Romania)	126–130	(Bulgaria) Kremikovtsi	58–58	68–72
Fémina Lausanne (Switzerland)	164–151	(France) Villeurbanne	76–99	41–90
MENT Thessaloniki (Greece)	145–194	(Hungary) MTK Budapest	72–96	73–98
UBC Media Rent (Austria)	121–153	(Italy) Parma Primizie	72–72	49–81
Stade Français (France)	179–118	(Portugal) CREA Lisboa	87–60	92–58
USC Munich (Germany)	187–106	(Switzerland) Serron	105–52	82–54
Pécsi (Hungary)	126–139	(Bulgaria) Akademik Plovdiv	61–54	65–85
Slavia Sofia (Bulgaria)	172–181	(Socialist Federal Republic of Yugoslavia) Red Star Belgrade	85–93	87–88
Orchies (France)	126–139	(France) Challes	66–65	58–72
Riento Turku (Finland)	108–173	(Czech Republic) Sparta Prague	53–84	55–89
Željezničar Sarajevo (Socialist Federal Republic of Yugoslavia)	164–160	(Italy) Magenta	85–78	79–82

== First round ==
Team #1	Agg.	Team #2	1st	2nd
La Gerbe Montceau (France)	129–157	(Italy) Deborah Milan	66–82	63–75
Maccabi Tel Aviv (Israel)	117–151	(Bulgaria) Minyor Pernik	62–76	55–75
Toledo 92 (Spain)	130–119	(Poland) Wisla Krakow	69–55	61–64
Welheim (Germany)	144–169	(Socialist Federal Republic of Yugoslavia) Ježica	72–82	72–87
Tungsram Budapest (Hungary)	134–133	(Czech Republic) Slavia Prague	70–65	64–68
Villeurbanne (France)	120–136	(Bulgaria) Kremikovtsi	68–60	52–76
CSKA Moscow (Soviet Union)	209–127	(Hungary) MTK Budapest	122–63	87–64
Parma Primizie (Italy)	195–165	(Spain) Tintoretto Getafe	100–81	95–84
USC Munich (Germany)	141–176	(France) Stade Français	67–75	74–101
Akademik Plovdiv (Bulgaria)	124–157	(Italy) Libertas Trogylos	61–79	63–78
Red Star Belgrade (Socialist Federal Republic of Yugoslavia)	186–126	(France) Challes	106–66	80–60
Željezničar Sarajevo (Socialist Federal Republic of Yugoslavia)	159–185	(Czech Republic) Sparta Prague	82–80	77–105

== Group stage ==
=== Group A ===
Team	Pld	W	L	PF	PA
(Italy) Deborah Milan	4	3	1	293	267
(Bulgaria) Minyor Pernik	4	2	2	299	303
(Spain) Toledo 92	4	1	3	259	281

=== Group B ===
Team	Pld	W	L	PF	PA
(Socialist Federal Republic of Yugoslavia) Ježica	4	3	1	324	264
(Hungary) Tungsram Budapest	4	2	2	193	228
(Bulgaria) Kremikovtsi	4	1	3	273	310

=== Group C ===
Team	Pld	W	L	PF	PA
(Soviet Union) CSKA Moscow	4	?	?	?	?
(Italy) Parma Primizie	4	?	?	?	?
(France) Stade Français	4	1	3	283	341

=== Group D ===
Team	Pld	W	L	PF	PA
(Italy) Libertas Trogylos	4	3	1	351	308
(Socialist Federal Republic of Yugoslavia) Red Star Belgrade	4	3	1	336	229
(Czech Republic) Sparta Prague	4	0	4	258	339

== Semifinals ==
Team #1	Agg.	Team #2	1st	2nd
CSKA Moscow (Soviet Union)	207–139	(Italy) Libertas Trogylos	104–64	103–75
Ježica (Socialist Federal Republic of Yugoslavia)	134–158	(Italy) Deborah Milan	59–86	75–72

== Final ==
Team #1		Team #2
CSKA Moscow (Soviet Union)	92–86	(Italy) Deborah Milan
