= 1974–75 Ronchetti Cup =

The 1974–75 Ronchetti Cup was the fourth edition of FIBA's second-tier competition for European women's basketball clubs, previously named FIBA Women's European Cup Winners' Cup. It was renamed in memory of Italian player Liliana Ronchetti, who had died in February 1974 of cancer at the age of 26. It was contested by 30 teams from 15 countries, 17 more contestants than in the previous season, with Austria, Sweden and Switzerland making their debut, and so three qualifying rounds were held instead of two. Spartak Leningrad, which had already dominated the Cup Winners' Cup, defeated Levski-Spartak Sofia in the final to win its fourth title in a row.

== First qualifying round ==
Team #1	Agg.	Team #2	1st	2nd
Carlsberg Brussels (Belgium)	?–?	(Portugal) FC Porto	?–?	?–?
Nyon Basket Féminin (Switzerland)	88–98	(Spain) Tabacalera La Coruña	53–54	35–44
PIT Arras (France)	?–?	(Belgium) ABBC Le Logis	61–69	?–?
UBZ Salzburg (Austria)	?–?	(Sweden) KFUM Stockholm	?–?	35–44
ATV Düsseldorf (Germany)	146–181	(Bulgaria) Minyor Pernik	61–83	85–98
ZKK Vozdovac (Socialist Federal Republic of Yugoslavia)	?–?	(Italy) AS Vicenza	?–?	?–?
DBC Aalst (Belgium)	?–?	(Switzerland) BBC Bern	61–55	?–?
Juventus Roma (Italy)	?–?	(Germany) WLF Marburg	78–49	?–?
CIF Lisboa (Portugal)	51–92	(Spain) Celta Vigo	27–40	24–52

== Second qualifying round ==
Team #1	Agg.	Team #2	1st	2nd
Carlsberg Brussels (Belgium)	?–?	(Bulgaria) Levski-Spartak Sofia	32–115	?–?
FC Lyon (France)	?–?	(Hungary) Budapesti Spartacus	58–59	?–?
Tabacalera La Coruña (Spain)	83–143	(Romania) IEFS Bucharest	49–70	34–73
ABBC Le Logis (Belgium)	?–?	(Israel) Maccabi Tel Aviv	60–55	?–?
KFUM Stockholm (Sweden)	?–?	(Spain) CREFF Madrid	?–?	45–72
Minyor Pernik (Bulgaria)	121–117	(Italy) Standa Milano	77–57	44–60
Voždovac (Socialist Federal Republic of Yugoslavia)	?–?	(Czech Republic) Slavia Prague	61–80	?–?
DBC Aalst (Belgium)	109–133	(France) La Gerbe BC	68–68	41–65
Juventus Roma (Italy)	Walkover	(Socialist Federal Republic of Yugoslavia) Crvena Zvezda Belgrade		
Celta Vigo (Spain)	126–93	(Germany) TV Grafemberg	72–61	54–32

== Third qualifying round ==
Team #1	Agg.	Team #2	1st	2nd
Levski-Spartak Sofia (Bulgaria)	143–123	(Hungary) Budapesti Spartacus	84–46	59–77
IEFS Bucharest (Romania)	130–111	(Israel) Maccabi Tel Aviv	65–57	65–54
CREFF Madrid (Spain)	96–142	(Bulgaria) Minyor Pernik	51–56	45–86
Slavia Prague (Czech Republic)	124–122	(France) La Gerbe BC	70–58	54–64
Crvena zvezda (Socialist Federal Republic of Yugoslavia)	169–124	(Spain) Celta Vigo	102–62	67–62

== Group stage ==
=== Group A ===
Team	Pld	W	L	PF	PA
(Soviet Union) Spartak Leningrad	4	?	?	?	?
(Bulgaria) Levski-Spartak Sofia	4	?	?	?	?
(Romania) IEFS Bucharest	4	0	4	198	276

	SPA	LEV	IEF
Spartak		115–46	69–41
Levski	?–?		64–51
IEFS	55–79	51–64	

=== Group B ===
Team	Pld	W	L	PF	PA
(Bulgaria) Minyor Pernik	4	2	2	294	282
(Socialist Federal Republic of Yugoslavia) Crvena zvezda	4	2	2	298	305
(Czech Republic) Slavia Prague	4	2	2	267	292

	MIN	CRZ	SLA
Minyor		87–67	79–53
Crvena Zvezda	78–68		79–66
Slavia	64–60	84–74	

== Semifinals ==
Team #1	Agg.	Team #2	1st	2nd
Minyor Pernik (Bulgaria)	116–144	(Bulgaria) Levski-Spartak Sofia	75–75	41–69
Crvena zvezda (Socialist Federal Republic of Yugoslavia)	87–119	(Soviet Union) Spartak Leningrad	41–56	46–63

== Final ==
Team #1	Agg.	Team #2	1st	2nd
Levski-Spartak Sofia (Bulgaria)	113–143	(Soviet Union) Spartak Leningrad	59–64	54–79
