= 1991–92 Ronchetti Cup =

The 1991-92 Ronchetti Cup was the 21st edition of FIBA Europe's second-tier competition for women's basketball clubs, running from 2 October 1991 to 18 March 1992. A quarter-final round as introduced, and the qualifying round was shortened. Alike the previous edition the final confronted two Italian teams, with five-times European Cup champion AS Vicenza defeating Libertas Trogylos in the final to become the fourth Italian team to win the competition.

== Qualifying round ==
Team #1	Agg.	Team #2	1st	2nd
Humboldt Universität (Germany)	158–171	(Sweden) Södertälje	80–85	78–86
Yükselis Genglik (Turkey)	123–162	(Hungary) Pécsi	63–75	60–87
MENT Thessaloniki (Greece)	79–157	(France) Racing Paris	43–78	36–79
Madeira (Portugal)	75–195	(France) Aix	46–86	29–109
Ramat HaSharon (Israel)	122–130	(Belgium) Waregem	57–55	65–75
Sparta Bertrange (Luxembourg)	100–155	(Germany) Lotus München	59–78	41–77
Metalul Ramnicu Valcea (Romania)	144–156	(Hungary) Ferencvárosi	89–72	57–83
AZS Lublin (Poland)	155–200	(Finland) Karhun Pojat	84–98	71–102
Fenerbahçe (Turkey)	112–138	(Slovakia) Lokomotiva Kosice	52–75	60–63
Concern Podolsk (Soviet Union)	193–130	(Romania) Sportul Studentesc	109–67	84–63

== Round of 32 ==
Team #1	Agg.	Team #2	1st	2nd
Södertälje (Sweden)	160–155	(Czech Republic) USK Prague	81–63	79–92
Pécs (Hungary)	154–146	(Socialist Federal Republic of Yugoslavia) Jedinstvo Tuzla	77–68	77–78
Budapesti SE (Hungary)	119–151	(France) Racing Paris	66–82	53–69
Spojnia (Poland)	164–177	(Bulgaria) Stara Zagora	75–73	89–104
Aix (France)	100–157	(Italy) Athena Cesena	61–77	39–80
Panathinaikos (Greece)	168–179	(Italy) Bari	81–87	87–92
Waregem (Belgium)	110–163	(Italy) Vicenza	52–75	58–88
Lotus München (Germany)	154–167	(Spain) Vigo	77–84	77–83
Ferencvárosi (Hungary)	175–194	(Spain) Zaragoza	120–100	55–94
Karhun Pojat (Finland)	160–150	(Socialist Federal Republic of Yugoslavia) Partizan Belgrade	86–89	74–61
Valenciennes (France)	156–155	(Socialist Federal Republic of Yugoslavia) Ježica	77–65	79–90
Budapesti EAC (Hungary)	116–128	(Czech Republic) Lokomotiva Kosice	75–57	53–59
Concern Podolsk (Soviet Union)	156–131	(Bulgaria) Slavia Sofia	79–74	77–57
Brisaspor (Turkey)	79–222	(Italy) Libertas Trogylos	43–111	36–111
LKS Lodz (Poland)	144–153	(Sweden) Solna	76–69	68–84
Grasshoppers Katwijk (Netherlands)	86–187	(France) Mirande	39–86	47–101

== Group stage ==
=== Group A ===
Team	Pld	W	L	PF	PA
(Italy) Athena Cesena	6	5	1	508	429
(Soviet Union) Concern Podolsk	6	3	3	501	497
(Finland) Karhun Pojat	6	2	4	500	523
(Spain) Vigo	6	2	4	419	479

=== Group B ===
Team	Pld	W	L	PF	PA
(Spain) Zaragoza	6	4	2	436	377
(Bulgaria) Stara Zagora	6	4	2	470	450
(France) Mirande	6	3	3	462	445
(Italy) Bari	6	1	5	400	496

=== Group C ===
Team	Pld	W	L	PF	PA
(Italy) Libertas Trogylos	6	5	1	504	410
(France) Racing Paris	6	4	2	514	457
(Sweden) Södertälje	6	2	4	462	530
(Hungary) Pécsi	6	2	4	428	511

=== Group D ===
Team	Pld	W	L	PF	PA
(Italy) Vicenza	6	5	1	461	396
(France) Valenciennes	6	4	2	500	442
(Sweden) Solna	6	3	3	429	423
(Czech Republic) Lokomotiva Kosice	6	0	6	353	482

== Quarter-finals ==
Team #1	Agg.	Team #2	1st	2nd
Concern Podolsk (Soviet Union)	164–168	(Spain) Zaragoza	96–81	68–87
Valenciennes (France)	133–144	(Italy) Libertas Trogylos	59–70	74–74
Stara Zagora (Bulgaria)	128–157	(Italy) Athena Cesena	66–69	62–88
Racing Paris (France)	119–139	(Italy) Vicenza	68–74	51–65

== Semifinals ==
Team #1	Agg.	Team #2	1st	2nd
Zaragoza (Spain)	147–152	(Italy) Libertas Trogylos	78–75	69–77
Athena Cesena (Italy)	143–151	(Italy) Vicenza	67–81	76–70

== Final ==
Team #1	Agg.	Team #2	1st	2nd
Libertas Trogylos (Italy)	136–154	(Italy) Vicenza	67–78	69–76
