= 1987–88 Ronchetti Cup =

The 1987–88 Ronchetti Cup was the 17th edition of FIBA's second-tier competition for European women's basketball clubs. It was contested by 34 teams from 17 countries (two more teams and three more countries than the previous edition), and ran from 23 September 1987 to 3 March 1988. Dynamo Kyiv defeated 100–83 previous year's runner-up Deborah Milano in the final, played in Athens, to become the sixth Soviet champion of the competition. It was the fourth edition in a row won by different Soviet teams. 4-times champion Spartak Leningrad and Slavia Prague also reached the semifinals.

== First qualifying round ==
Team #1	Agg.	Team #2	1st	2nd
YMCA London (England)	126–176	(Sweden) Visby	64–85	62–91
Wels (Austria)	132–142	(Germany) Munich	64–76	68–66
Esperance Pully (Switzerland)	150–166	(Greece) Ment Thessaloniki	90–80	60–86
Kralovopolska Brno (Czech Republic)	136–181	(Soviet Union) Dynamo Kyiv	77–79	59–102
Algés e Dafundo (Portugal)	102–208	(France) Montferrandaise	56–97	46–111
Cents (Luxembourg)	80–213	(France) Astarac Mirande	47–98	33–115
Barmer Wuppertal (Germany)	170–128	(Belgium) Runkster Hasselt	79–56	91–72
Serron (Greece)	95–195	(Hungary) EAC Budapest	53–98	42–97
Elemens Sibenik (Socialist Federal Republic of Yugoslavia)	172–95	(Greece) Panathinaikos	101–52	71–43
Unicar Cesena (Italy)	174–150	(Poland) Wisła Kraków	95–71	79–79

== Second qualifying round ==
Team #1	Agg.	Team #2	1st	2nd
Visby (Sweden)	127–149	(Italy) Deborah Milano	69–84	58–65
Munich (Germany)	127–149	(France) Racing Paris	70–75	53–92
Partizan Belgrade (Socialist Federal Republic of Yugoslavia)	177–130	(Greece) MENT Thessaloniki	88–62	89–68
Pécsi (Hungary)	119–162	(Soviet Union) Dynamo Kyiv	63–65	56–97
Montferrandaise (France)	120–171	(Socialist Federal Republic of Yugoslavia) Iskra Ljubljana	51–97	69–74
Villeurbanne (France)	144–148	(Italy) Libertas Trogylos	88–60	56–88
Pangrati Athens (Greece)	80–174	(Czech Republic) Slavia Prague	53–74	27–100
Astarac Mirande (France)	158–172	(Italy) Sidis Ancona	93–76	65–96
Barmer Wuppertal (Germany)	154–172	(Hungary) BSE Budapest	83–66	71–106
Spartak Leningrad (Soviet Union)	210–147	(Hungary) EAC Budapest	107–68	103–79
Hapoel Givat Haim (Israel)	101–193	(Socialist Federal Republic of Yugoslavia) Elemens Sibenik	43–97	58–96
Vozdovac (Socialist Federal Republic of Yugoslavia)	128–131	(Italy) Unicar Cesena	75–72	53–59

== Group stage ==
=== Group A ===
	Team	Pld	W	L	PF	PA
1.	(Italy) Deborah Milano	4	4	0	338	218
2.	(France) Racing Paris	4	1	3	261	317
3.	(Socialist Federal Republic of Yugoslavia) Partizan Belgrade	4	1	3	252	316

=== Group B ===
	Team	Pld	W	L	PF	PA
1.	(Soviet Union) Dynamo Kyiv	4	3	1	314	300
2.	(Socialist Federal Republic of Yugoslavia) Iskra Ljubljana	4	2	2	310	305
3.	(Italy) Libertas Trogylos	4	1	3	271	290

=== Group C ===
	Team	Pld	W	L	PF	PA
1.	(Czech Republic) Slavia Prague	4	3	1	295	290
2.	(Italy) Sidis Ancona	4	3	1	321	314
3.	(Hungary) BSE Budapest	4	0	4	313	325

=== Group D ===
	Team	Pld	W	L	PF	PA
1.	(Soviet Union) Spartak Leningrad	4	4	0	385	317
2.	(Socialist Federal Republic of Yugoslavia) Elemens Sibenik	4	1	3	306	336
3.	(Italy) Unicar Cesena	4	1	3	300	338

== Semifinals ==
Team #1	Agg.	Team #2	1st	2nd
Dynamo Kyiv (Soviet Union)	131–121	(Czech Republic) Slavia Prague	77–65	54–56
Spartak Leningrad (Soviet Union)	162–168	(Italy) Deborah Milano	92–92	70–76

== Final ==
Team #1		Team #2
Dynamo Kyiv (Soviet Union)	100–83	(Italy) Deborah Milano
