= 1989–90 FIBA Women's European Champions Cup =

International basketball competition

The 1989–90 FIBA Women's European Champions Cup was the 32nd edition of FIBA Europe's competition for national champions women's basketball clubs, running from September 1989 to 29 March 1990. Libertas Trogylos Basket defeated 1989 Ronchetti Cup champion CSKA Moscow in the final, played in Cesena, to become the fourth Italian club to win the competition. Red Star Belgrade and BAC Mirande were third and fourth respectively.

== Qualifying round ==
Team #1	Agg.	Team #2	1st	2nd
Forssan Aiku (Finland)	111–167	(Poland) Wlokniarz Pablanice	64–82	67–85
Walferdange (Luxembourg)	?	(Italy) Libertas Trogylos	43–111	?
Arvika (Sweden)	127–108	(Netherlands) BV Den Helder	69–46	58–62
Partizani Tirana (Albania)	133–171	(Romania) Universitatea Cluj	72–81	61–90
Wels (Austria)	134–152	(Hungary) MTK Budapest	69–88	65–64
Elitzur Holon (Israel)	121–163	(Greece) Sporting Athens	70–80	51–83
Universitesi Istanbul (Turkey)	104–182	(France) Astarac Mirande	59–88	45–95
Wüppertal (Germany)	125–142	(Bulgaria) Kremikovtsi	64–75	61–67
Lisboa (Portugal)	123–170	(Spain) Toledo 92	63–93	60–77

== Round of 12 ==
Team #1	Agg.	Team #2	1st	2nd
Wlokniarz Pablanice (Poland)	118–138	(Italy) Libertas Trogylos	58–64	60–74
CSKA Moscow (Soviet Union)	191–165	(Sweden) Arvika	96–76	95–89
Universitatea Cluj (Romania)	151–157	(Socialist Federal Republic of Yugoslavia) Crvena zvezda	77–74	74–83
MTK Budapest (Hungary)	158–172	(Czech Republic) Slavia Prague	75–76	83–96
Sporting Athens (Greece)	120–150	(France) Astarac Mirande	56–58	64–92
Kremkovtsi (Bulgaria)	131–152	(Spain) Toledo 92	71–82	60–70

== Group stage ==
Team	Pld	W	L	PF	PA
(Italy) Libertas Trogylos	10	8	2	716	713
(Soviet Union) CSKA Moscow	10	7	3	819	764
(Socialist Federal Republic of Yugoslavia) Crvena zvezda	10	5	5	811	746
(France) Astarac Mirande	10	5	5	771	793
(Spain) Toledo 92	10	4	6	764	760
(Czech Republic) Slavia Prague	10	1	9	724	829

== Final ==
Team #1		Team #2
Libertas Trogylos (Italy)	86–71	(Soviet Union) CSKA Moscow
