= 1989–90 Ronchetti Cup =

The 1988–89 Ronchetti Cup was the 18th edition of FIBA's second-tier competition for European women's basketball clubs. The final returned to its original two-leg format 13 years later, and the group stage was expanded from 12 to 16 teams. Primigi Parma defeated Jedinstvo Tuzla in the final to become the second Italian champion of the competition, ending Soviet hegemony in the previous seasons and starting an era of Italian dominance. The three previous seasons' runner-up Gemeaz Milano and Iskra Ljubljana also reached the semifinals.

== First qualifying round ==
Team #1	Agg.	Team #2	1st	2nd
Weilhelm (Germany)	157–166	(Hungary) Budapest EAC	77–78	80–88
Noamh Dublin (Republic of Ireland)	105–218	(France) ASPTT Aix	56–101	49–117
Apollon Kalamarias (Greece)	124–177	(Czech Republic) Slavia Banska Bystrica	62–87	62–90
CIF Lisboa (Portugal)	115–178	(France) Stade Clermontois	54–85	61–93
Orchies (France)	134–139	(Poland) Olimpia Poznań	73–59	61–80
Saint Servais (Belgium)	99–175	(France) Racing Paris	55–99	44–76
Galatasaray (Turkey)	168–106	(Luxembourg) Sparta Bertrange	88–45	80–61
Kerrygold Canarias (Spain)	144–138	(Hungary) Spartacus Budapest	61–72	83–66
Italmeco Bari (Italy)	121–120	(Hungary) Tungsram Budapest	66–60	55–60

== Second qualifying round ==
Team #1	Agg.	Team #2	1st	2nd
Agia Paraskevi (Greece)	103–165	(Socialist Federal Republic of Yugoslavia) Jedinstvo Tuzla	49–64	54–101
Budapest EAC (Hungary)	122–164	(Italy) Saturnia Viterbo	62–93	60–71
ASPTT Aix (France)	149–156	(Spain) Tintoretto Getafe	75–67	74–89
Sampo Lahti (Finland)	129–138	(Poland) Spójnia Gdańsk	67–61	62–77
Panathinaikos (Greece)	106–173	(Italy) Gemeaz Milano	53–87	53–86
Horizont Minsk (Soviet Union)	142–129	(Romania) Vointa Bucharest	69–51	73–78
Slavia Banska Bystrica (Czech Republic)	142–121	(Israel) Bnei Yehuda	69–75	73–46
Budapest SE (Hungary)	131–155	(Bulgaria) Levski Sofia	74–68	57–87
Stade Clermontois (France)	149–168	(Italy) Primigi Parma	82–77	67–91
Dynamo Volgograd (Soviet Union)	140–125	(Poland) Olimpia Poznań	72–53	68–72
Banco Zaragozano (Spain)	137–165	(France) Racing Paris	75–83	62–82
Minyor Pernik (Bulgaria)	153–154	(Czech Republic) Sparta Prague	79–63	74–91
Galatasaray (Turkey)	147–203	(Socialist Federal Republic of Yugoslavia) Iskra Ljubljana	86–99	61–104
Elektrosila Leningrad (Soviet Union)	182–145	(Bulgaria) Slavia Sofia	95–62	87–83
Kerrygold Canarias (Spain)	145–108	(Greece) MENT Thessaloniki	79–46	66–62
Italmeco Bari (Italy)	131–130	(Germany) Agon Düsseldorf	84–66	47–64

== Group stage ==
=== Group A ===
Team	Pld	W	L	PF	PA
(Socialist Federal Republic of Yugoslavia) Jedinstvo Tuzla	6	5	1	500	428
(Italy) Saturnia Viterbo	6	4	2	437	425
(Spain) Tintoretto Getafe	6	3	3	413	433
(Poland) Spójnia Gdańsk	6	0	6	406	467

=== Group B ===
Team	Pld	W	L	PF	PA
(Italy) Gemeaz Milan	6	5	1	450	404
(Soviet Union) Horizont Minsk	6	4	2	457	414
(Czech Republic) Slavia Banska Bystrica	6	2	4	434	466
(Bulgaria) Levski Sofia	6	1	5	428	485

=== Group C ===
Team	Pld	W	L	PF	PA
(Italy) Primigi Parma	6	4	2	491	469
(Soviet Union) Dynamo Volgograd	6	4	2	487	453
(France) Racing Paris	6	4	2	438	425
(Czech Republic) Sparta Prague	6	0	6	392	461

=== Group D ===
Team	Pld	W	L	PF	PA
(Socialist Federal Republic of Yugoslavia) Iskra Ljubljana	6	5	1	484	412
(Soviet Union) Elektrosila Leningrad	6	4	2	528	453
(Spain) Kerrygold Canarias	6	2	4	399	470
(Italy) Italmeco Bari	6	1	5	349	425

== Semifinals ==
Team #1	Agg.	Team #2	1st	2nd
Primigi Parma (Italy)	135–122	(Italy) Gemeaz Milano	79–73	56–49
Iskra Ljubljana (Socialist Federal Republic of Yugoslavia)	149–150	(Socialist Federal Republic of Yugoslavia) Jedinstvo Tuzla	76–75	73–75

== Final ==
Team #1	Agg.	Team #2	1st	2nd
Primigi Parma (Italy)	150–131	(Socialist Federal Republic of Yugoslavia) Jedinstvo Tuzla	79–54	71–77
