= 1986–87 Ronchetti Cup =

The 1986–87 Ronchetti Cup was the 16th edition of FIBA's second-tier competition for European women's basketball clubs. It was contested by 32 clubs from 14 countries, seven more than in the previous edition, and ran from 1 October 1986 to 11 March 1987. The final was played in France, in the Alsacian town of Wittenheim, and confronted 18-times European champion Daugava Riga and Italian vice-champion Deborah Milano. The former won 87–80, thus becoming the fifth Soviet club to win the competition. Iskra Ljubljana and VŠ Prague also reached the semifinals.

== First qualifying round ==
Team #1	Agg.	Team #2	1st	2nd
Željezničar Sarajevo (Socialist Federal Republic of Yugoslavia)	185–99	(Greece) AOP Falirou	99–47	86–52
Trogylos Libertas Priolo (Italy)	260–110	(Israel) Maccabi Ramat Gan	142–50	118–60
Bayer Wuppertal (Germany)	125–126	(France) Villeurbanne	56–68	69–58
Apollon Kalamarias (Greece)	102–200	(Bulgaria) Minyor Pernik	58–96	44–104
UBC Wells (Austria)	107–209	(France) Monfferandaise	54–96	53–113
Sampo Lahti (Finland)	110–164	(Czech Republic) Lokomotiva Košice	58–91	52–73
Black Star Mersch (Luxembourg)	80–251	(Spain) Sabor d'abans Tortosa	45–131	35–120
Astarac Mirande (France)	164–113	(Greece) Panathinaikos	91–56	73–57
Espérants Wasserbilig (Luxembourg)	97–130	(Austria) UBL Wien	50–71	47–59
Megas Alexandros (Greece)	79–205	(Hungary) Kecskeméti	39–101	40–104

== Second qualifying round ==
Team #1	Agg.	Team #2	1st	2nd
Fellisatti Ferrara (Italy)	147–138	(Socialist Federal Republic of Yugoslavia) Željezničar Sarajevo	77–70	70–68
Kremikovtsi (Bulgaria)	148–138	(Italy) Libertas Trogylos Priolo	87–63	61–75
Deborah Milano (Italy)	164–111	(France) Villeurbanne	84–55	80–56
Minyor Pernik (Bulgaria)	156–138	(Hungary) MTK Budapest	80–60	76–78
VŠ Prague (Czech Republic)	167–108	(France) Monfferandaise	93–61	74–47
Lokomotiva Košice (Czech Republic)	153–158	(Socialist Federal Republic of Yugoslavia) Jedinstvo Tuzla	63–76	90–82
Sabor d'abans Tortosa (Spain)	170–131	(France) Paris Racing	83–65	87–66
Iskra Ljubljana (Socialist Federal Republic of Yugoslavia)	164–124	(France) Astarac Mirande	94–53	70–71
Sidis Ancona (Italy)	175–84	(Austria) UBL Wien	81–44	94–40
Kecskeméti (Hungary)	153–165	(Bulgaria) Lokomotiv Sofia	84–85	69–80

== Group stage ==
=== Group A ===
	Team	Pld	W	L	PF	PA
1.	(Soviet Union) Daugava Riga	4	4	0	323	260
2.	(Italy) Felisatti Ferrara	4	1	3	301	297
3.	(Bulgaria) Kremikovtsi	4	1	3	252	319

=== Grup B ===
	Team	Pld	W	L	PF	PA
1.	(Italy) Deborah Milano	4	4	0	354	261
2.	(Hungary) Tungsram Budapest	4	2	2	281	280
3.	(Bulgaria) Minyor Pernik	4	0	4	253	347

=== Grup C ===
	Team	Pld	W	L	PF	PA
1.	(Czech Republic) VŠ Prague	4	3	1	330	278
2.	(Socialist Federal Republic of Yugoslavia) Jedinstvo Tuzla	4	2	2	283	302
3.	(Spain) Sabor d'abans Tortosa	4	1	3	253	347

=== Grup D ===
	Team	Pld	W	L	PF	PA
1.	(Socialist Federal Republic of Yugoslavia) Iskra Ljubljana	4	3	1	321	297
2.	(Italy) Sidis Ancona	4	3	1	322	297
3.	(Bulgaria) Lokomotiv Sofia	4	0	4	277	326

== Semifinals ==
Team #1	Agg.	Team #2	1st	2nd
Daugava Riga (Soviet Union)	145–135	(Socialist Federal Republic of Yugoslavia) Iskra Ljubljana	73–54	72–81
Deborah Milano (Italy)	167–135	(Czech Republic) VŠ Prague	96–65	71–70

== Final ==
Team #1		Team #2
Daugava Riga (Soviet Union)	87–80	(Italy) Deborah Milano
