= Ekaterina Ruzanova =

Russian basketball player

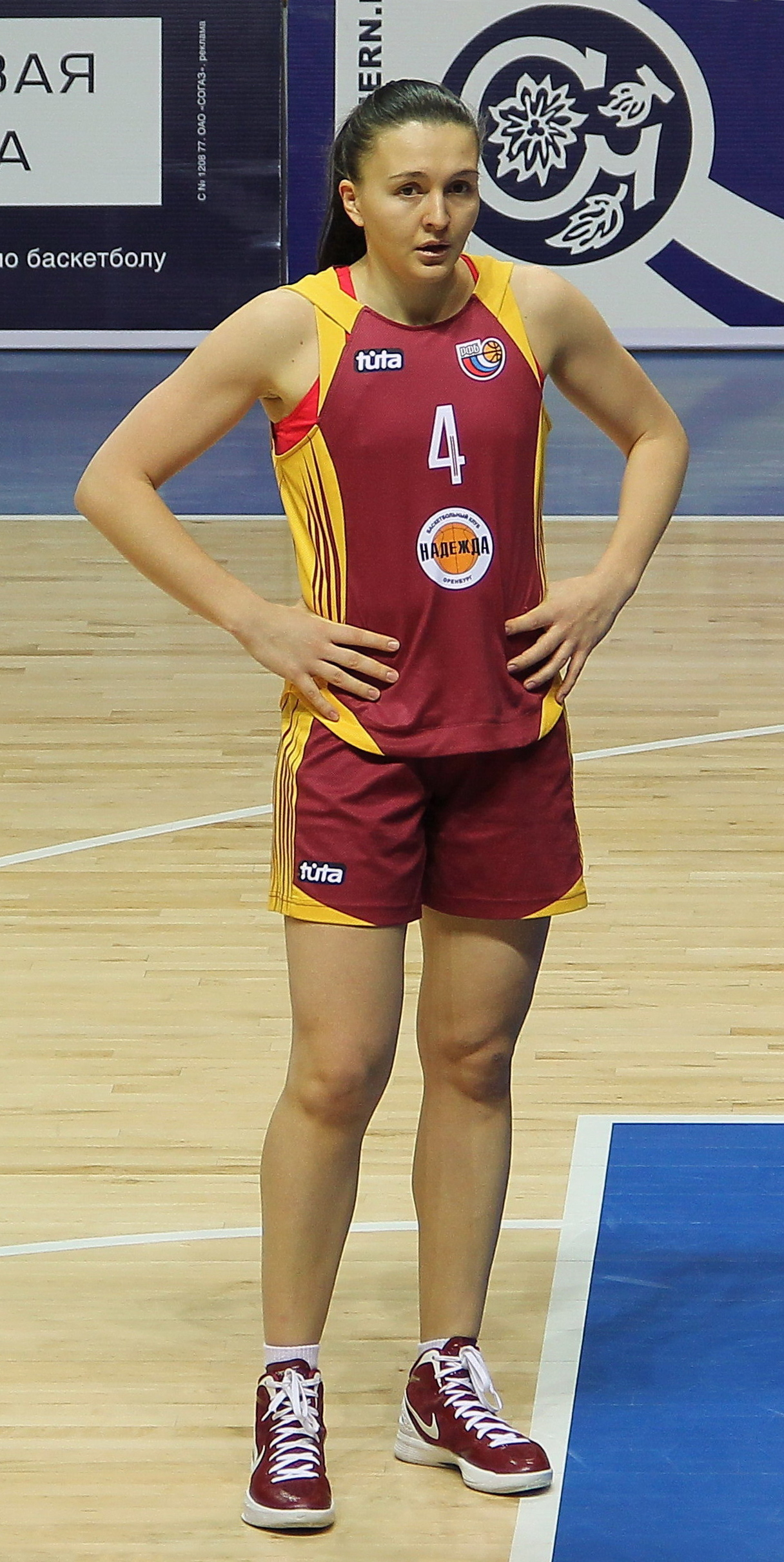
- Ruzanova in 2012

Personal information
- Born: 16 August 1982 (age 43) Tolyatti, Russia
- Height: 174 cm (5 ft 9 in)
- Weight: 69 kg (152 lb)

Sport
- Sport: Basketball
- Club: WBC CSKA Moscow (1997–99); SKIF (2000–2002); WBC CSKA Moscow (2002–04); Dynamo Moscow (2004–05); Chevakata Vologda (2005–06); WBC Spartak Saint Petersburg (2007–11); Nadezhda Orenburg (2011–12); WBC Spartak Moscow Region (2012–14)
Medal record
Representing Russia
World Championships
Silver medal – second place	2006 Brazil	Team
European Championships
Gold medal – first place	2007 Italy	Team

Ekaterina Aleksandrovna Ruzanova (née Demagina, Russian: Екатерина Александровна Рузанова, born 16 August 1982) is a retired Russian basketball point guard. She was part of the Russian teams that won the 2007 European Championships and placed second at the 2006 World Championships.
