= 1971–72 FIBA Women's European Cup Winners' Cup =

The 1971–72 FIBA Women's European Cup Winners' Cup, running from November 1971 to March 1972, was the inaugural edition of FIBA Europe's second-tier competition for women's basketball clubs, subsequently renamed Ronchetti Cup. The competition system was similar to that of the FIBA Women's European Champions Cup back then.

Spartak Leningrad won the first of four titles in a row beating ŽKK Voždovac in the final.

== Qualifying round ==
Team #1	Agg.	Team #2	1st	2nd
Academica Coimbra (Portugal)	76–115	(Spain) Mataró	39–45	37–70

== Round of 8 ==
Team #1	Agg.	Team #2	1st	2nd
Videoton (Hungary)	108–109	(Bulgaria) Lokomotiv Sofia	65–57	43–52
Düsseldorf (Germany)	109–193	(Czech Republic) Slavia Prague	60–104	49–89
Mataró (Spain)	100–126	(France) La Gerbe	53–52	47–74
Hapoel Jerusalem (Israel)	walkover	(Italy) Vicenza		

== Group stage ==
=== Group A ===
#	Team	Pld	W	L	PF	PA
1	(Soviet Union) Spartak Leningrad	4	4	0	289	214
2	(Bulgaria) Lokomotiv Sofia	4	2	2	238	259
3	(Czech Republic) Slavia Prague	4	0	4	224	278

=== Group B ===
#	Team	Pld	W	L	PF	PA
1	(Socialist Federal Republic of Yugoslavia) Voždovac	4	4	0	351	230
2	(France) La Gerbe	4	2	2	301	294
3	(Israel) Hapoel Jerusalem	4	0	4	196	324

== Semifinals ==
Team #1	Agg.	Team #2	1st	2nd
Spartak Leningrad (Soviet Union)	174–101	(France) La Gerbe	96–48	78–53
Voždovac (Socialist Federal Republic of Yugoslavia)	156–144	(Bulgaria) Lokomotiv Sofia	84–63	72–81

== Final ==
Team #1	Agg.	Team #2	1st	2nd
Spartak Leningrad (Soviet Union)	170–124	(Socialist Federal Republic of Yugoslavia) Voždovac	84–63	86–61
