= 1985–86 Ronchetti Cup =

The 1985–86 Ronchetti Cup was the 15th edition of the competition. It was won by Dynamo Novosibirsk, which defeated 1983 champions BSE Budapest in the final match, which took place in the Palau Blaugrana in Barcelona, Spain on 11 March 1986. Dynamo Novosibirsk became the fourth Soviet club to win the competition after Spartak Leningrad, Spartak Moscow and Daugava Rīga.

== First Qualification Round ==
Team #1	Agg.	Team #2	1st leg	2nd leg
Śląsk Wrocław (Poland)	165–144	(Finland) YMCA Helsinki	73 – 59	92 – 85
Voința Bucureşt (Romania)	162–173	(Socialist Federal Republic of Yugoslavia) Iskra Ljubljana	94 – 96	68 – 77
Ment Salonica (Greece)	143–152	Sporting Luxembourg	72 – 68	71 – 84
DBB Wien (Austria)	135–161	(Italy) Lanerossi Schio	81 – 79	54 – 82
Manchester (England)	86 – 177	(France) AS Villeurbanne	44 – 83	42 – 94
Slovan Bratislava (Czechoslovakia)	137–152	(Socialist Federal Republic of Yugoslavia) Jedinstvo Tuzla	74 – 64	63 – 88
Pécsi VSK (Hungary)	128–149	(Socialist Federal Republic of Yugoslavia) ZKK Voždovac	65 – 87	63 – 62
ASPTT Aix-en-Provence (France)	141–109	(Greece) Apollon Kalamarias	76 – 49	65 – 60

== Second Qualification Round ==
Team #1	Agg.	Team #2	1st leg	2nd leg
Śląsk Wrocław (Poland)	137–152	(Bulgaria) Lokomotiv Sofia	73 – 71	64 – 83
Iskra Ljubljana (Socialist Federal Republic of Yugoslavia)	200–108	Sporting Luxembourg	107 – 51	93 – 57
Budapesti Spartacus (Hungary)	127–148	(France) AS Villeurbanne	68 – 76	59 – 72
Maritsa Plovdiv (Bulgaria)	152–153	(Socialist Federal Republic of Yugoslavia) Jedinstvo Tuzla	80 – 72	72 – 81
ASPTT Aix-en-Provence (France)	130–164	(Socialist Federal Republic of Yugoslavia) ZKK Voždovac	69 – 77	61 – 87

== Group stage ==
=== Grup A ===
	Team	Pld	W	L	PF	PA
1.	(Soviet Union) Dynamo Novosibirsk	4	4	0	362	284
2.	(Bulgaria) Lokomotiv Sofia	4	2	2	305	302
3.	(Czech Republic) Sparta Prague	4	0	4	267	348

3 December 1985	Dynamo Novosibirsk	96-79	Lokomotiv Sofia
10 December 1985	Sparta Prague	83-87	Dynamo Novosibirsk
8 January 1986	Lokomotiv Sofia	72-56	Sparta Prague
15 January 1986	Lokomotiv Sofia	64-80	Dynamo Novosibirsk
22 January 1986	Dynamo Novosibirsk	99-58	Sparta Prague
29 January 1986	Sparta Prague	70-90	Lokomotiv Sofia

=== Grup B ===
	Team	Pld	W	L	PF	PA
1.	(Socialist Federal Republic of Yugoslavia) Iskra Ljubljana	4	3	1	340	300
2.	(France) AS Monferrandaise	4	3	1	340	341
3.	(Italy) Lanerossi Schio	4	0	4	301	340

4 December 1985	AS Monferrandaise	90-85	Lanerossi Schio
11 December 1985	Iskra Ljubljana	94-74	AS Monferrandaise
8 January 1986	Lanerossi Schio	75-80	Iskra Ljubljana
15 January 1986	Lanerossi Schio	79-87	AS Monferrandaise
22 January 1986	AS Monferrandaise	89-83	Iskra Ljubljana
29 January 1986	Iskra Ljubljana	83-62	Lanerossi Schio

=== Grup C ===
	Team	Pld	W	L	PF	PA
1.	(Hungary) BSE Budapest	4	4	0	314	266
2.	(Socialist Federal Republic of Yugoslavia) Jedinstvo Tuzla	4	2	2	281	303
3.	(Italy) Virtus Viterbo	4	0	4	249	275

3 December 1985	BSE Budapest	58-55	Virtus Viterbo
10 December 1985	Jedinstvo Tuzla	75-103	BSE Budapest
8 January 1986	Virtus Viterbo	60-69	Jedinstvo Tuzla
14 January 1986	Virtus Viterbo	71-76	BSE Budapest
21 January 1986	BSE Budapest	77-65	Jedinstvo Tuzla
29 January 1986	Jedinstvo Tuzla	72-63	Virtus Viterbo

=== Grup D ===
	Team	Pld	W	L	PF	PA
1.	(Bulgaria) Kremikovtsi Sofia	4	4	0	314	266
2.	(France) Racing Paris	4	2	2	294	300
3.	(Socialist Federal Republic of Yugoslavia) ZKK Voždovac	4	0	4	289	335

3 December 1985	ZKK Vozdovac	71-69	Kremikovtsi Sofia
10 December 1985	Racing Paris	83-73	ZKK Vozdovac
8 January 1986	Kremikovtsi Sofia	92-63	Racing Paris
15 January 1986	Kremikovtsi Sofia	89-74	ZKK Vozdovac
22 January 1986	ZKK Vozdovac	71-94	Racing Paris
29 January 1986	Racing Prague	54-64	Kremikovtsi Sofia

== Semifinals ==
Team #1	Agg.	Team #2	1st leg	2nd leg
Dynamo Novosibirsk (Soviet Union)	198–155	(Socialist Federal Republic of Yugoslavia) Iskra Ljubljana	116 – 67	82 – 88
Kremikovtsi Sofia (Bulgaria)	141–150	(Hungary) BSE Budapest	75 – 70	66 – 80

== Final ==
TV3

11 March 1986
19:00

Report

Dynamo Novosibirsk (Soviet Union)	80–62	(Hungary) BSE Budapest
Scoring by quarter: 20–19, 25–11, 12–17, 24–11
Pts: Kozhevnikova 22; Rebs: Kozhevnikova 12		Pts: Szöllösi 21; Rebs: Neméth 9

Palau Blaugrana, Barcelona
Referees: Marcé (ESP), Rui Valente (POR)
