= 1974 in basketball =

The following are the basketball events of the year 1974 throughout the world.

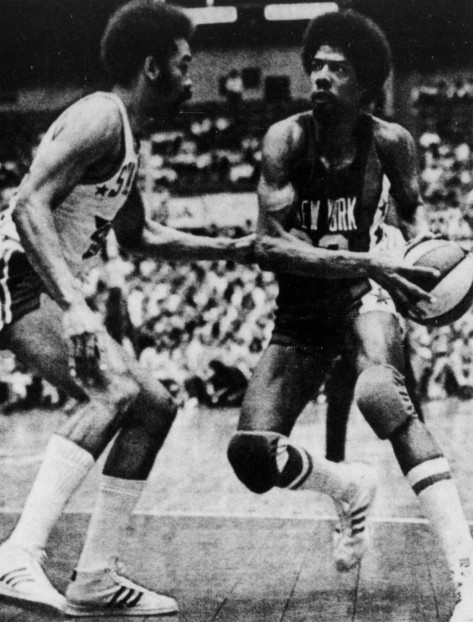
Willie Wise and Julius Erving during a game in the 1974 American Basketball Association playoffs

The following are the basketball events of the year 1974 throughout the world. Tournaments include international (FIBA), professional (club) and amateur and collegiate levels.

== ABA ==
- 1974 ABA All-Star Game
- 1974 ABA Playoffs
- 1973–74 ABA season
- Most Valuable Player: Julius Erving, New York Nets
- Rookie of the Year: Swen Nater, San Antonio Spurs
- Coach of the Year: Joe Mullaney, Utah Stars
- ABA All-Star Game MVP:Artis Gilmore
- ABA Finals Most Valuable Player Award:Julius Erving

== NAIA ==
- 1974 NAIA Basketball Tournament

== NBA ==
- 1973-74 NBA season
- 1974 NBA Playoffs
- 1974 NBA draft
- 1974 NBA Finals, Celtics beat Bucks 4-3
- 1974 NBA All-Star Game

=== NBA awards ===
- NBA Finals MVP:John Havlicek, Boston Celtics
- Most Valuable Player: Kareem Abdul-Jabbar, Milwaukee Bucks
- Rookie of the Year: Ernie DiGregorio, Buffalo Braves
- Coach of the Year: Ray Scott, Detroit Pistons
- NBA All-Star Game MVP: Bob Lanier
- All-NBA First Team:
  - Walt Frazier, New York Knicks
  - Rick Barry, Golden State Warriors
  - Gail Goodrich, Los Angeles Lakers
  - John Havlicek, Boston Celtics
  - Kareem Abdul-Jabbar, Milwaukee Bucks

Note: All information on this page were obtained on the history section on NBA.com

== EBA ==
- EBA Most Valuable Player: Ken Wilburn, Allentown Jets
- EBA Rookie of the Year: Dennis Bell, Allentown Jets
- EBA Coach of the Year: Howie Landa, Allentown Jets

== FIBA ==
- 1973–74 FIBA European Champions Cup
- 1973–74 FIBA Women's European Champions Cup

== College ==
Men

- 1974 NCAA Men's Division I Basketball Tournament
- 1974 National Invitation Tournament
- 1974 NCAA Men's Division II Basketball Tournament

Women

- AIAW women's basketball tournament

== Women's tournaments ==
- 1973–74 FIBA Women's European Cup Winners' Cup
- 1974–75 Ronchetti Cup

== International Competition ==
- Basketball at the 1974 Asian Games
- 1974 FIBA Intercontinental Cup

== Naismith Memorial Basketball Hall of Fame ==
- Class of 1974:
  - Ernest Schmidt

== Births ==
- February 7 – Steve Nash, Canadian Basketball Hall of Famer
- March 27 – Marcus Camby, American Basketball player
- August 9 – Derek Fisher, American Basketball player
- September 7 – Antonio McDyess, American Basketball player
- September 10 – Ben Wallace, American Basketball Hall of Fame player
- September 17 – Rasheed Wallace, American Basketball player
- October 2 – Anthony Johnson, American Basketball player
- November 5 – Jerry Stackhouse, American Basketball player
- November 15 – Giovanna Granieri, Italian former basketball player
- November 23 – Malik Rose, American Basketball player

== Deaths ==
- March 21 – Bill Mokray, American Hall of Fame basketball historian (born 1907)
- April 16 – Everett Shelton, American Hall of Fame college coach (born 1898)
- September 16 – Phog Allen, American Hall of Fame college coach (born 1885)
- October 15 – Maury John, American college coach (Drake, Iowa State) (born 1919)

== See also ==
- 1974 in sports
