= Soviet Women's Basketball Championship =

The Soviet Women's Basketball Championship was founded in 1937 and was the top women's basketball competition in the Soviet Union.

== History ==
The championship was founded in 1937, and dominated by Dynamo Moscow in its early stages. Four years later it was interrupted due to World War Two. The competition was resumed in 1944, with MAI becoming a second powerhouse. In 1949 Dynamo Kyiv became the first non-Russian team to win the championship.

In 1959 Dynamo Moscow represented the Soviet Union in the inaugural edition of the European Cup. That same year the championship was won by Latvian team Daugava Riga, which soon established itself as the championship's major powerhouse, winning every edition of the tournament in the 1960s. Daugava's hegemony loosened somewhat in the 1970s, losing the 1974 and 1978 championships to Spartak Leningrad and Spartak Moscow, but still the Latvians, led by Uljana Semjonova, won every other edition until 1984.

In the second half of the 1980s Russian teams took again the lead, with CSKA Moscow and Dynamo Novosibirsk entering the competition's palmares. Following the collapse of the Soviet Union the championship was closed after the 1991 edition, which was won by Dynamo Kyiv. A CIS Championship was played in 1992 before each republic founded its own national league.

In addition to its hegemony in the championship Daugava Riga won a record 18 European Cups between 1960 and 1982, including 12 titles in a row. It was only in 1972 when other Soviet teams had the chance to triumph in Europe with the foundation of the Ronchetti Cup. Spartak Leningrad, Spartak Moscow, CSKA Moscow, Dynamo Novosibirsk, Daugava Riga and Dynamo Kyiv won 12 editions of the tournament.

== Title holders ==
- 1922–23 Petrograd Selective Team
- 1923–24 Moscow Selective Team
- 1924–27 Not held
- 1927–28 Leningrad Selective Team
- 1928–33 Not held
- 1933–34 Moscow Selective Team
- 1934–35 Leningrad Selective Team
- 1935–36 Moscow Selective Team
- 1936–37 Dynamo Moscow
- 1937–38 Dynamo Moscow
- 1938–39 Dynamo Moscow
- 1939–40 Dynamo Moscow
- 1940–43 Not held due to World War II
- 1943–44 Dynamo Moscow
- 1944–45 Dynamo Moscow
- 1945–46 MAI
- 1946–47 MAI
- 1947–48 Dynamo Moscow
- 1948–49 Dynamo Kyiv
- 1949–50 Dynamo Moscow
- 1950–51 MAI
- 1951–52 Stroitel Moscow
- 1952–53 Dynamo Moscow
- 1953–54 MAI
- 1954–55 MAI
- 1955–56 Moscow Selective Team
- 1956–57 Dynamo Moscow
- 1957–58 Dynamo Moscow
- 1958–59 Moscow Selective Team
- 1959–60 Daugava Riga
- 1960–61 Daugava Riga
- 1961–62 Daugava Riga
- 1962–63 Latvian SSR Team
- 1963–64 Daugava Riga
- 1964–65 Daugava Riga
- 1965–66 Daugava Riga
- 1966–67 Latvian SSR Team
- 1967–68 Daugava Riga
- 1968–69 Daugava Riga
- 1969–70 Daugava Riga
- 1970–71 Daugava Riga
- 1971–72 Daugava Riga
- 1972–73 Daugava Riga
- 1973–74 Spartak Leningrad
- 1974–75 Daugava Riga
- 1975–76 Daugava Riga
- 1976–77 Daugava Riga
- 1977–78 Spartak Moscow
- 1978–79 Daugava Riga
- 1979–80 Daugava Riga
- 1980–81 Daugava Riga
- 1981–82 Daugava Riga
- 1982–83 Daugava Riga
- 1983–84 Daugava Riga
- 1984–85 CSKA Moscow
- 1985–86 Dynamo Novosibirsk
- 1986–87 Dynamo Novosibirsk
- 1987–88 Dynamo Novosibirsk
- 1988–89 CSKA Moscow
- 1989–90 Elektrosila Leningrad
- 1990–91 Dynamo Kyiv
- 1991–92 Dynamo Kyiv
