= WBC MAI =

Women's Basketball Club of Moscow Aviation Institute (студенческий женский баскетбольный клуб Московского авиационного института), also known as MAI, was a basketball club based in Moscow, Russian SFSR, Soviet Union.

== History ==
The team was founded in 1945 based on the female student's sports club of the Moscow Aviation Institute and participated in the first championship of the All-Union competition in 1945 where it won the silver medal, defeated in the final by Dynamo Moscow. The following season (1945–46) MAI became national champion for the first time in its history, an achievement that was repeated one year later. The next decade was critical to women's Soviet basketball: 4 times champion, 4 times silver medalist, winner of the USSR Women's Cup, winner of three championships of Trade Unions, and in 1956, five players of the teams were part of the champion I Games of the peoples of the USSR national team in Moscow.

== Honours & achievements ==
Soviet League

- Winners (5): 1945–46, 1946–47, 1950–51, 1953–54, 1954–55
