= Milka Bjelica =

Montenegrin basketball player

Personal information
- Born: 22 June 1981 (age 45) Belgrade, SFR Yugoslavia
- Listed height: 1.93 m (6 ft 4 in)
- Listed weight: 84 kg (185 lb)

Career information
- WNBA draft: 2003: undrafted
- Playing career: 1997–2016
- Position: Center

Career history
- 1997–2000: Crvena zvezda
- 2000–2002: Hemofarm
- 2002–2003: Crvena zvezda
- 2003–2004: Solnok
- 2004–2005: Mercede Algero
- 2005–2007: Taranto Cras Basket
- 2007–2008: Ros Casares Valencia
- 2008–2009: Atletico Faenza
- 2009–2010: Teo Vilnius
- 2010: Napoli BK
- 2010–2011: Riviera Gdynia
- 2011–2012: TS Wisła Can-Pack Kraków
- 2012–2013: Târgoviște
- 2013: Beşiktaş
- 2013–2014: USK Prague
- 2014–2015: Hatay
- 2016: Castors Braine

Milka Bjelica (Serbian Cyrillic: Милка Бјелица; born 22 June 1981 in Belgrade, SFR Yugoslavia) is a Montenegrin former women's basketball player. She has a younger brother, Milko and sister Ana. Milko is a basketball player and Ana is a volleyball player. Their parents are also former players.
