= Rebecca Tobin =

American basketball player born 1988

Olympiacos
- Position: Center

Personal information
- Born: April 21, 1988 (age 38) Glendale, Arizona
- Listed height: 6 ft 5 in (1.96 m)

Career information
- High school: Cactus (Glendale, Arizona)
- College: Arizona State (2007–2011)
- WNBA draft: 2011: undrafted
- Playing career: 2011–present

Career history
- 2011: Basket Parma
- 2012–2013: CSU Alba Iulia
- 2013–2014: DVTK Miskolc
- 2014–2015: Angers Basket
- 2016: Antenienses de Manati
- 2016: Indias de Mayaguez
- 2016–2018: TSV 1880 Wasserburg
- 2018–2019: Bendigo Spirit
- 2019: Rutronik Stars Keltern
Medals
Representing United States
Women's basketball

Rebecca Diane Tobin (born April 21, 1988) is an American professional basketball player.

== College career ==
Tobin played four seasons of college basketball at Arizona State University in Tempe, Arizona for the Sun Devils.

=== Arizona State statistics ===
Legend
GP	Games played	GS	Games started	MPG	Minutes per game
FG%	Field goal percentage	3P%	3-point field goal percentage	FT%	Free throw percentage
RPG	Rebounds per game	APG	Assists per game	SPG	Steals per game
BPG	Blocks per game	PPG	Points per game	**Bold**	Career high

Year	Team	GP	Points	FG%	3P%	FT%	RPG	APG	SPG	BPG	PPG
2007-08	Arizona State	31	74	45.6%	0.0%	68.8%	1.9	0.2	0.2	0.2	2.4
2008-09	Arizona State	**35**	167	**55.4%**	0.0%	71.7%	5.1	1.1	0.7	0.9	4.8
2009-10	Arizona State	32	**311**	49.1%	0.0%	**84.8%**	**6.4**	0.8	**1.0**	**1.2**	**9.7**
2010-11	Arizona State	30	256	50.0%	0.0%	77.6%	5.8	**1.3**	0.9	0.8	8.5
Career		128	808	50.3%	11.1%	78.4%	12.8	0.8	0.7	0.8	6.3

== Professional career ==
=== Europe ===
After going undrafted Tobin travelled to Europe to begin her professional career, signing with Basket Parma in the Italian league, Serie A1. In early 2012, Tobin would then sign with CSU Alba Iulia, playing two seasons in the Liga Națională in Romania. In 2013, Tobin would remain in eastern Europe, signing with DVTK Miskolc in Hungary's Nemzeti Bajnokság I/A. In 2014, Tobin would debut in the French Ligue Féminine de Basketball with Union Angers Basket 49.

In 2016, Tobin returned to European basketball after signing with TSV 1880 Wasserburg in the DBBL. Tobin played here for two seasons.

=== WNBA ===
In 2015, Tobin was signed by the Phoenix Mercury to a training camp contract. However, Tobin was soon released due to health problems.

In 2016, Tobin was signed as a free-agent to the Los Angeles Sparks training camp roster. Tobin was waived before the beginning of the season.

=== WNBL ===
In May 2018, Tobin signed with the Bendigo Spirit for the 2018–19 WNBL season. She finished seventh overall in season MVP voting, and third overall in voting for the Defensive Player of the Year.

Tobin returned to the Spirit for the 2019–20 WNBL season but was released in December 2019.
