= Henry Fields =

American basketball player (1938–2024)

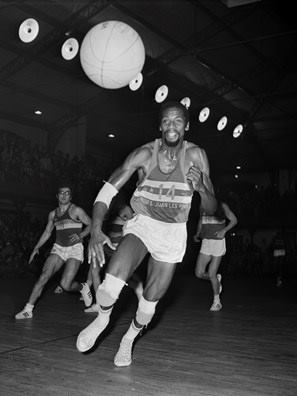

Personal information
- Born: May 3, 1938 New York City, New York, U.S.
- Died: October 26, 2024 (aged 86)
- Listed height: 197 cm (6 ft 6 in)

Career information
- College: Elizabeth City (1955–1959)
- Position: Center

Career history

Playing
- 1960–1962: OC Orleans
- 1962–1963: Paris Université Club
- 1965–1966: Stade Français
- 1966–1971: Olympique d'Antibes
- 1972–1975: AS Monaco
- 198?–198?: US Ville d'Avra

Coaching
- 1987–1988: AS Tarare Basket
- 1981–1986: US Ville d'Avra
- 1998: US Auterive Basketball
- 2000: ASPTT-Barguillère-Foix

Career highlights
- As player: 2× French champion (1963, 1970); Coupe de France (1963); 2× LNB Pro B (1968, 1973); French championship Foreign Player of the Year (1970); As coach: LNB Pro B (1973)

Henry Fields (May 3, 1938 – October 26, 2024) was an American basketball player and coach. Nicknamed "the Gentleman", he won the French national championship in 1963 and 1970 and was named the French championship Foreign Player of the Year in 1970. Fields played college basketball at the Elizabeth City State Teachers College where he earned CIAA All-Conference honors.

Following his graduation from college, Fields entered the United States Army. Due to a three-year commitment, he was able to choose his assignment and chose France. He stated later that his choice was influenced by a Sports Illustrated feature on Jean-Claude Lefebvre, a French basketball player who played for the Gonzaga University. In France, he was stationed in Orléans where he became a member of the United States military team who he helped win gold at the European and World Military Basketball Championships.

== Personal life and death ==
Following his basketball career, Fields settled in France with his Norwegian wife.

In 2018, the sports arena in Auterive was named Halle Henry Fields in his honour.

Fields died on October 26, 2024, at the age of 86.
