= Arnaud Kerckhof =

French basketball player

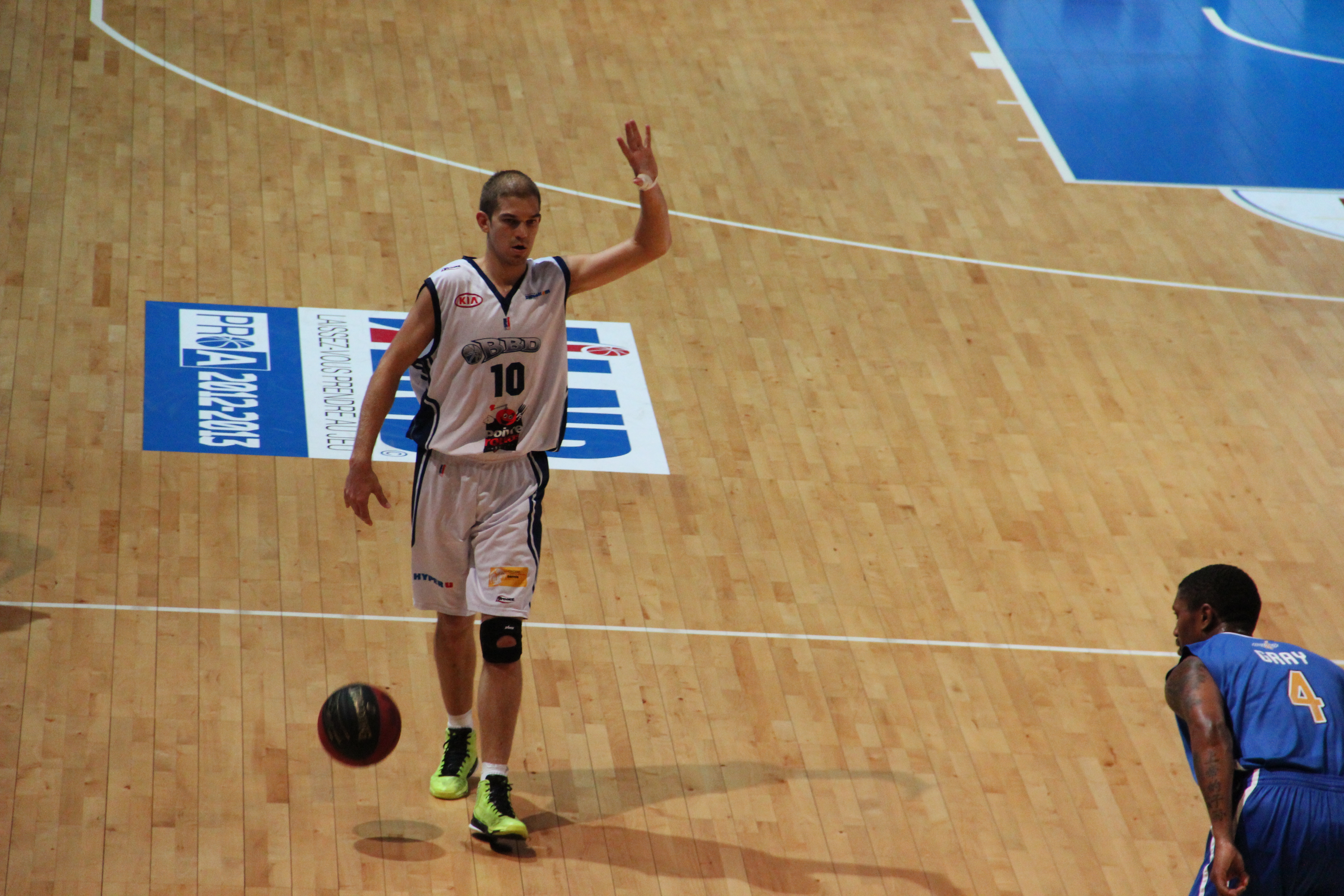
- Kerckhof in October 2012

No. 10 – BC Orchies
- Position: Point guard
- League: LNB Pro B

Personal information
- Born: March 13, 1984 (age 42) Calais, France
- Listed height: 6 ft 4 in (1.93 m)
- Listed weight: 181 lb (82 kg)

Career information
- NBA draft: 2006: undrafted
- Playing career: 2002–present

Career history
- 2002–2006: BCM Gravelines-Dunkerque
- 2006–2007: Châlons-en-Champagne
- 2007–2009: JSF Nanterre
- 2009–2010: Antibes Sharks
- 2010–2018: Boulazac Basket Dordogne
- 2018–present: BC Orchies

Career highlights
- French Cup runner-up (2018)

Arnaud Kerckhof (born March 13, 1984) is a French professional basketball player for BC Orchies of LNB Pro B.

On June 18, 2013, after three seasons at Boulazac Basket Dordogne, he decided to prolong his stay with the team despite its relegation to Pro B. He played an important role in the recovery of his club in Pro A during the playoffs in 2017.

He re-signed with Boulazac Basket Dordogne on July 13, 2017.

On August 10, 2018, after eight years at Boulazac, he signed with BC Orchies.
