= 1972–73 FIBA Women's European Cup Winners' Cup =

The 1972–73 FIBA Women's European Cup Winners' Cup, running from November 1972 to March 1973, was the second edition of FIBA Europe's second-tier competition for women's basketball clubs, subsequently renamed Ronchetti Cup. Defending champion Spartak Leningrad won its second title beating Slavia Prague in the final.

== First qualifying round ==
Team #1	Agg.	Team #2	1st	2nd
Spartacus Antwerpen (Belgium)	109–150	(Romania) IEFS Bucharest	56–76	53–74
Academica Porto (Portugal)	86–118	(France) Lille	40–51	46–67
Hapoel Tel Aviv (Israel)	104–80	(Spain) CREFF Madrid	60–35	44–45

== Second qualifying round ==
Team #1	Agg.	Team #2	1st	2nd
IEFS Bucharest (Romania)	99–132	(Czech Republic) Slavia Prague	43–62	56–70
MTK Budapest (Hungary)	128–85	(France) Lille	61–40	67–45
Hapoel Tel Aviv (Israel)	124–98	(Germany) Düsseldorf	71–52	53–46

== Group stage ==
=== Group A ===
#	Team	Pld	W	L	PF	PA
1	(Bulgaria) Levski Sofia	4	3	1	331	301
2	(Socialist Federal Republic of Yugoslavia) Crvena zvezda	4	3	1	370	320
3	(Israel) Hapoel Tel Aviv	4	0	4	265	345

=== Group B ===
#	Team	Pld	W	L	PF	PA
1	(Soviet Union) Spartak Leningrad	4	4	0	305	183
2	(Czech Republic) Slavia Prague	4	2	2	195	251
3	(Hungary) MTK Budapest	4	0	4	191	257

== Semifinals ==
Team #1	Agg.	Team #2	1st	2nd
Levski Sofia (Bulgaria)	137–150	(Czech Republic) Slavia Prague	90–78	47–72
Crvena zvezda (Socialist Federal Republic of Yugoslavia)	139–220	(Soviet Union) Spartak Leningrad	68–104	71–116

== Final ==
Team #1	Agg.	Team #2	1st	2nd
Slavia Prague (Czech Republic)	92–140	(Soviet Union) Spartak Leningrad	55–64	37–76
