= Tatyana Ovechkina =

Russian basketball player

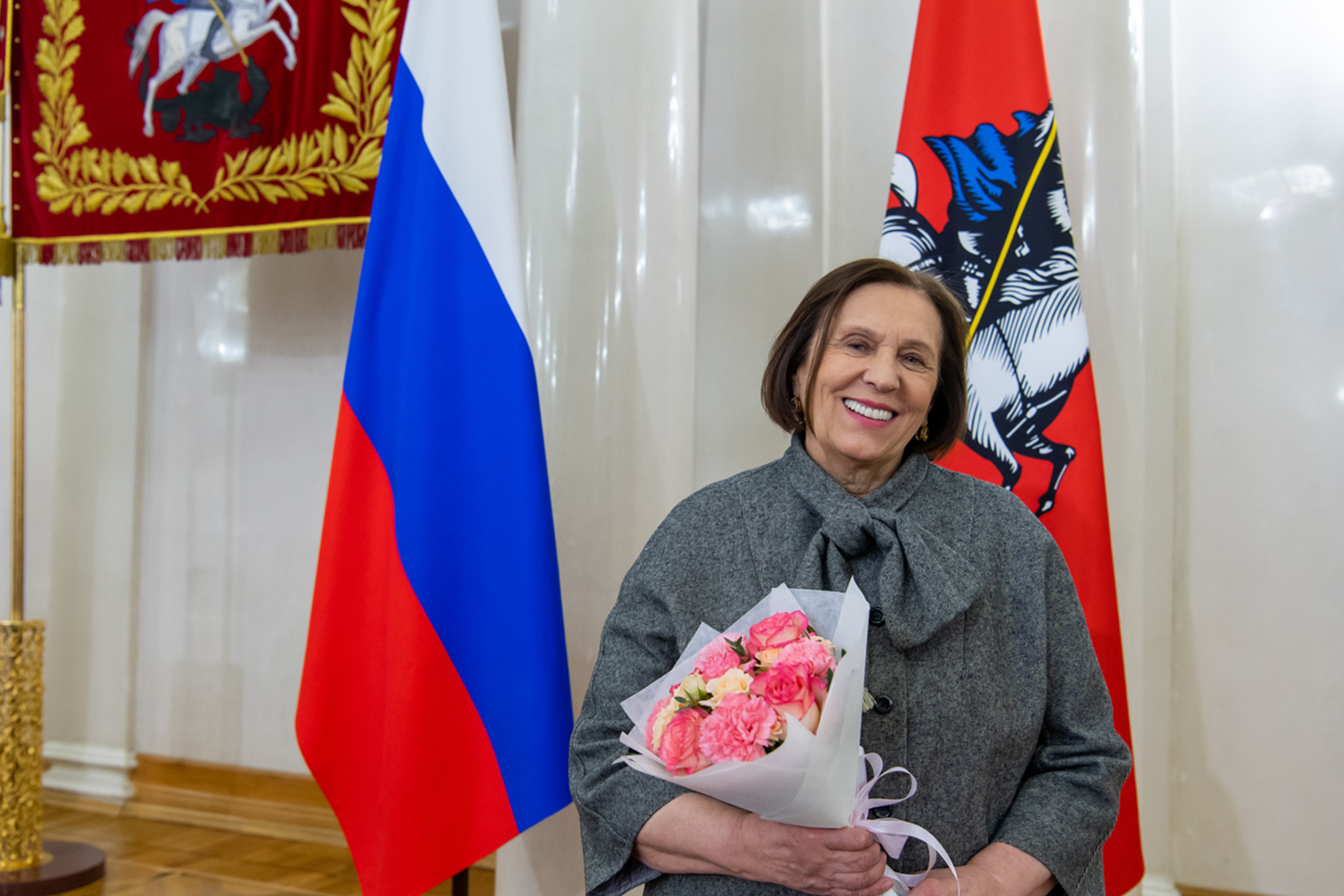
- Ovechkina in 2023

Personal information
- Born: 19 March 1950 (age 76) Moscow, Russian SFSR, Soviet Union
- Listed height: 174 cm (5 ft 9 in)
- Listed weight: 69 kg (152 lb)
- Position: Point guard

Career highlights
- Order of the Badge of Honor (1976); Order of Friendship of Peoples (1980)
Medals
Women's Basketball
Representing the Soviet Union
Olympic Games
Gold medal – first place	1976 Montreal	National team
Gold medal – first place	1980 Moscow	National team
World Championship
Gold medal – first place	1975 Colombia	National team
European Championship
Gold medal – first place	1970 Netherlands	National team
Gold medal – first place	1972 Bulgaria	National team
Gold medal – first place	1974 Italy	National team
Gold medal – first place	1976 France	National team
Gold medal – first place	1978 Poland	National team
Gold medal – first place	1980 Yugoslavia	National team
Universiade
Gold medal – first place	1977 Sofia	National team

Tatyana Nikolaevna Ovechkina (Russian: Татьяна Николаевна Овечкина; maiden name: Kabayeva; born 19 March 1950) is a former Russian basketball player who played for the Soviet Union women's national basketball team that won two Olympic gold medals, the 1975 World Championships and six European Championships. Today, she runs the Russia women's national basketball program.

== Early life ==
Ovechkina was born in Moscow. At age 7, she was walking home from school when an automobile struck her and mangled her right leg. She spent a year in the hospital recovering.

== Career ==
At 16, Tatyana joined Dynamo Moscow's women's basketball team and soon became its star. At age 19, she was named team captain and played in the club for 13 more years.

Ovechkina won two Olympic gold medals for the USSR team, in 1976 and 1980, and never lost a game in an official international competition. She also won the 1975 World Championship, six European Championships (1970, 1972, 1974, 1976, 1978, 1980), and the 1977 Summer Universiade. She retired from the national team at age 30.

She was awarded the Order of the Badge of Honor in 1976 and the Order of Friendship of Peoples in 1980. In recent years, she was overwhelmingly chosen the 20th century's best female point guard by the readers of the Sport-Express, a Russian daily newspaper. Currently, she is a candidate for induction into the FIBA Hall of Fame.

== Personal life ==
Ovechkina is the mother of professional ice hockey player Alexander Ovechkin, who plays in the National Hockey League (NHL) for the Washington Capitals and is regarded as one of the best hockey players of all time. He wears #8 in honor of Tatyana, who wore #8 during her basketball career.
