= 1973–74 FIBA Women's European Cup Winners' Cup =

The 1973–74 FIBA Women's European Cup Winners' Cup was the third edition of FIBA Europe's second-tier competition for women's basketball clubs, running between 6 November 1973 and 10 April 1974. Defending champion Spartak Leningrad defeated Geas Basket in the final to win its third title in a row.

== First qualifying round ==
Team #1	Agg.	Team #2	1st	2nd
La Gerbe (France)	146–100	(Portugal) Porto	86–49	60–51
Woluwé (Belgium)	90–99	(Spain) Picadero	51–50	39–49

== Second qualifying round ==
Team #1	Agg.	Team #2	1st	2nd
Geas (Italy)	123–121	(Bulgaria) Akademik Sofia	50–41	73–80
Picadero (Spain)	86–133	(Hungary) Budapesti Spartacus	40–73	46–60
Hapoel Tel Aviv (Israel)	?	(Romania) IEFS Bucharest	?	?
BC La Gerbe (France)	122–139	(Czech Republic) Kravopolská Brno	61–58	61–81
Göttingen (Germany)	110–143	(Socialist Federal Republic of Yugoslavia) Željezničar Sarajevo	59–85	51–78

== Group stage ==
=== Group A ===
Team	Pld	W	L	GF	GA	GD
(Italy) Geas	4	3	1	246	216	+30
(Romania) IEFS Bucharest	4	2	2	247	250	−3
(Hungary) Budapesti Spartacus	4	1	3	235	262	−27

=== Group B ===
Team	Pld	W	L	GF	GA	GD
(Soviet Union) Spartak Leningrad	4	4	0	371	207	+164
(Czech Republic) Kravopolská Brno	4	2	2	283	297	−14
(Socialist Federal Republic of Yugoslavia) Željezničar Sarajevo	4	0	4	220	370	−150

== Semifinals ==
Team #1	Agg.	Team #2	1st	2nd
Spartak Leningrad (Soviet Union)	163–81	(Romania) IEFS Bucharest	86–41	77–40
Geas (Italy)	111–109	(Czech Republic) Kralovopolská Brno	55–59	56–50

== Final ==
Team #1	Agg.	Team #2	1st	2nd
Spartak Leningrad (Soviet Union)	128–115	(Italy) Geas	68–58	60–57
