= Basket Parma =

Italian women's basketball club

- Leagues: Serie A1
- Founded: 1962
- Arena: Palaciti
- Location: Parma, Italy
- Team colors: Yellow and blue
- President: Gianni Bertolazzi
- Head coach: Mauro Procaccini
- Championships: 1 Serie A1; 3 Coppe Italia; 2 Supercoppe Italiane; 3 Ronchetti Cup
- Website: basket-parma.com
Home	Away

Basket Parma, also known as Lavezzini Parma for sponsorship reasons, is an Italian women's basketball club from Parma playing in Serie A1. It was established in 1962 as Associazione Basket Parma.

Parma's first major success was winning the 1990 Ronchetti Cup, beating Jedinstvo Tuzla in the final. This was followed by a second Ronchetti trophy in 1993. The team also reached the final in 1994, 1995 and 1997, but lost to Ahena Cesena, CJM Bourges and CSKA Moscow respectively. After winning the 1998 Coppa Italia, in 2000 it again reached the final and defeated CB Islas Canarias to win its third title, which makes it the second most successful team in the competition along with CSKA Moscow and Spartak Moscow.

In 2001 Parma won both the Serie A and the national cup, and the following year it reached the Euroleague's Final Four, where it was beaten by Lotos Gdynia and defeated MBK Ruzomberok to attain a bronze. In addition, it successfully defended its cup title. The team hasn't won any more trophies since then. It has made three more appearances in the Euroleague (2003–05), and four appearances in the Eurocup (2006–09).

== Titles ==
- Ronchetti Cup
  - 1990, 1993, 2000
- Serie A1
  - 2001
- Coppa Italia
  - 1998, 2001, 2002
- Suppercopa Italiana
  - 1997, 2002

== 2011–12 roster ==
- (1.95) (United States) Rebecca Tobin
- (1.88) (Italy) Barbara Gibertini
- (1.87) (France) Nicole Antibe
- (1.87) (Lithuania) Gabriele Narviciute
- (1.86) (Bulgaria) Gergana Slavcheva
- (1.82) (Italy) Claudia Corbani
- (1.81) (Italy) Maria Chiara Franchini
- (1.81) (Italy) Monica Vaccari
- (1.77) (Italy) Valeria Battisodo
- (1.76) (Italy) Sophie Fall
- (1.69) (Brazil) Adriana Pinto
- (1.68) (Italy) Francesca Piedimonte

== Famous players ==
- (Czech Republic) Eva Němcová-Horáková
- (United States) Cynthia Cooper-Dyke
