= Ronchetti Cup =

European basketball competition

- Sport: Basketball
- Founded: 1971
- First season: 1971–72
- Folded: 2002
- Country: FIBA Europe member associations
- Last champions: (Italy) Famila Schio (2nd title)
- Most titles: (Soviet Union) Spartak Leningrad (4 titles)

The Ronchetti Cup (called till 1996 European Cup Liliana Ronchetti and European Cup Winners' Cup till 1974) was an annual women's basketball European club competition held by FIBA between 1972 and 2002. It was the second competition in European basketball, after the European Cup For Women's Champions Clubs (later renamed EuroLeague Women).

It was replaced in 2002 by the EuroCup Women which is the absolute equivalent.

== History ==
=== Liliana Ronchetti and European basketball ===
Liliana Ronchetti started playing basketball in Como, Italy at the age of 20. Ronchetti, or Lily as she was called by her team mates, won 4 consecutive national titles with Como in the 1950s and played 83 games for the Italian national team.

One year after she quit basketball Lily died of cancer. Her name has persisted through the European Cup Liliana Ronchetti (renamed in 1996 more simply Ronchetti Cup). This competition was created by FIBA in 1974 as the second European competition for women's clubs.

== Ronchetti Cup winners ==
Year	Host	Final			Third and fourth place	
Year	Host	Winner	Score	Runner-up	Third place	Fourth place
1971–72; Details	2 matches played in the final	(Soviet Union); Spartak Leningrad	170–124; 84–63 / 86–61	(Socialist Federal Republic of Yugoslavia); Voždovac	(France); La Gerbe	(Bulgaria); Lokomotiv Sofia
1972–73; Details	2 matches played in the final	(Soviet Union); Spartak Leningrad	140–92; 64–55 / 76–37	(Czechoslovakia); Slavia Prague	(Socialist Federal Republic of Yugoslavia); Crvena zvezda	(Bulgaria); Levski Sofia
1973–74; Details	2 matches played in the final	(Soviet Union); Spartak Leningrad	128–115; 68–58 / 60–57	(Italy); Geas	(Romania); IEFS Bucharest	(Czechoslovakia); Kralovopolská Brno
1974–75; Details	2 matches played in the final	(Soviet Union); Spartak Leningrad	143–113; 64–59 / 79–54	(Bulgaria); Levski Sofia	(Socialist Federal Republic of Yugoslavia); Crvena zvezda	(Bulgaria); Minyor Pernik
1975–76; Details	2 matches played in the final	(Czechoslovakia); Slavia VŠ Praha	141–129; 68–51 / 73–78	(Socialist Federal Republic of Yugoslavia); Industromontaza Zagreb	(France); BC La Gerbe	(Italy); Ceramica Pagnossin Treviso
1976–77; Details	Italy (Rome)	(Soviet Union); Spartak Moscow	97–54	(Bulgaria); Minyor Pernik	(Bulgaria); Lokomotiv Sofia	(Czechoslovakia); Slavia Praga
1977–78; Details	Bulgaria (Haskovo)	(Bulgaria); Levski Sofia	50–49	(Czechoslovakia); Slovan Bratislava	(Bulgaria); Lokomotiv Sofia	(Hungary); BSE Esma
1978–79; Details	Bulgaria (Yambol)	(Bulgaria); Levski Sofia	70–69	(Bulgaria); DFS Maritza Plovdiv	(Italy); Fiat Torino	(Czechoslovakia); HC Slovan
1979–80; Details	Bulgaria (Pernik)	(Socialist Federal Republic of Yugoslavia); Montmontaža Zagreb	82–76	(Bulgaria); DFS Maritza Plovdiv	(Socialist Federal Republic of Yugoslavia); ZKK Vozdovac	(Bulgaria); BK Slavia Sofia
1980–81; Details	Italy (Rome)	(Soviet Union); Spartak Moscow	95–63	(Socialist Federal Republic of Yugoslavia); Montmontaža Zagreb	(Czechoslovakia); Slavia Praga	(France); Clermont Club Universite
1981–82; Details	Austria (Linz)	(Soviet Union); Spartak Moscow	89–68	(Czechoslovakia); Kralovopolska Brno	(Hungary); Tungsgram S.C. Budapest	Akademik Sofia Bandiera della Bulgaria
1982–83; Details	Italy (Mestre)	(Hungary); BSE Budapest	83–81 (2 OT)	(Soviet Union); Spartak Moscow	(France); Stade Français	(France); A.S. Villeurbanne
1983–84; Details	Hungary (Budapest)	(Italy); SS Bata Rome	69–59	(Hungary); BSE Budapest	(France); Racing Basket	(Socialist Federal Republic of Yugoslavia); ZKK Vozdovac
1984–85; Details	Italy (Viterbe)	(Soviet Union); CSKA Moscow	76–64	(Italy); SISV Bata Viterbo	(Czechoslovakia); Spartak Sokolovo	(Bulgaria); DFS Kremikovcy
1985–86; Details	Spain (Barcelona)	(Soviet Union); Dynamo Novosibirsk	81–58	(Hungary); BSE Budapest	(Socialist Federal Republic of Yugoslavia); Iskra Delta Ježica	(Bulgaria); Kremikovtsi Sofia
1986–87; Details	France (Wittenheim)	(Soviet Union); Daugava Riga	87–80	(Italy); B.F. Deborah Milan	(Socialist Federal Republic of Yugoslavia); Iskra Delta Ježica	(Czechoslovakia); VŠ Prague
1987–88; Details	Greece (Athens)	(Soviet Union); WBC Dynamo Kyiv	100–83	(Italy); B.F. Deborah Milan	(Czechoslovakia); Slavia Prague	(Soviet Union); Spartak Leningrad
1988–89; Details	Italy (Florence)	(Soviet Union); CSKA Moscow	92–86	(Italy); B.F. Deborah Milan	(Italy); Libertas Trogylos	(Socialist Federal Republic of Yugoslavia); Ježica
1989–90; Details	2 matches played in the final	(Italy); Parma Primizie	150–131; 79–54 / 71–77	(Socialist Federal Republic of Yugoslavia); Jedinstvo Aida Tuzla	(Italy); Gemeaz Milano	(Socialist Federal Republic of Yugoslavia); Ježica
1990–91; Details	2 matches played in the final	(Italy); Gemeaz-Cusin Milan	152–145; 94–76 / 58–69	(Italy); Como Jersey	(Soviet Union); CSKA Moscow	(Spain); Godella
1991–92; Details	2 matches played in the final	(Italy); Estel Vicenza	154–136; 78–67 / 76–69	(Italy); Trogylos Priolo	(Italy); Athena Cesena	(Spain); Zaragoza
1992–93; Details	2 matches played in the final	(Italy); Lavezzini Basket Parma	162–132; 91–62 / 71–70	(Poland); TS Olimpia Poznan	(Italy); Willwood Vicenza	(France); Valenciennes Olympic
1993–94; Details	2 matches played in the final	(Italy); Ahena Cesena	144–133; 78–65 / 66–68	(Italy); Lavezzini Basket Parma	(Spain); BEX Argentaria	(France); Tarbes
1994–95; Details	2 matches played in the final	(France); CJM Bourges Basket	112–100; 56–47 / 56–53	(Italy); Lavezzini Basket Parma	(Italy); Isab Energy Priolo	(France); Challes Savoie
1995–96; Details	2 matches played in the final	(France); Tarbes GB	163–126; 81–63 / 82–63	(Italy); Basket Alcamo	(Hungary); BSE ESMA	(France); ASPTT Aix-en-Provence
1996–97; Details	2 matches played in the final	(Russia); CSKA Moscow	143–113; 72–54 / 71–59	(Italy); Lavezzini Basket Parma	(France); ASPTT Aix-en-Provence	(Socialist Federal Republic of Yugoslavia); Zkk Profi
1997–98; Details	2 matches played in the final	(Hungary); Gysev Ringa Sopron	142–135; 70–65 / 72–70	(France); ASPTT Aix-en-Provence	(Poland); ŁKS Sommer-Komfort Łódź	(Israel); Elitzur Delek Ramla
1998–99; Details	2 matches played in the final	(Spain); Caja Rural Las Palmas	136–133; 72–79 / 64–54	(Israel); A.S. Ramat-Hasharon	(Italy); Isab Energy Priolo	(France); W Bordeaux Basket
1999–00; Details	2 matches played in the final	(Italy); Lavezzini Basket Parma	127–116; 64–60 / 63–56	(Spain); Caja Rural Las Palmas	(Germany); DJK Wildcats	(Ukraine); Kozachka-ZALK
2000–01; Details	2 matches played in the final	(Italy); Famila Schio	162–143; 75–73 / 87–70	(Turkey); Botaş SK	(Ukraine); Kozachka-ZALK	(Israel); A.S. Ramat-Hasharon
2001–02; Details	2 matches played in the final	(Italy); Famila Schio	150–143; 73–69 / 77–74	(France); Tarbes GB	(Hungary); Postas Taban Trafik	(Russia); Dynamo Moscow

== Medals (1971-2002) ==
Rank	Nation	Gold	Silver	Bronze	Total
1	Russia (RUS)	13	1	3	17
2	Italy (ITA)	9	11	8	28
3	Bulgaria (BUL)	2	4	9	15
4	France (FRA)	2	2	12	16
5	Hungary (HUN)	2	2	4	8
6	Serbia (SRB)	1	4	9	14
7	Czech Republic (CZE)	1	3	7	11
8	Spain (ESP)	1	1	3	5
9	Israel (ISR)	0	1	2	3
10	Poland (POL)	0	1	1	2
11	Turkey (TUR)	0	1	0	1
12	Ukraine (UKR)	0	0	2	2
13	Germany (GER)	0	0	1	1
13	Romania (ROU)	0	0	1	1
Totals (14 entries)		31	31	62	124

1. Russia + Soviet Union
2. Serbia + Yugoslavia
3. Czech Republic + Czechoslovakia
