= Lega Basket Femminile =

Serie A1
- Organising body: Italian Basketball Federation
- Founded: 1930
- Country: Italy
- Confederation: FIBA Europe
- Number of teams: 11
- Domestic cup: Italian Cup
- Current champions: Reyer Venezia
- Most championships: Comense (15 titles)
- Website: www.legabasketfemminile.it
- 2024–25 Lega Basket Femminile

Lega Basket Femminile (LBF) is the premier national league for women's basketball clubs in Italy, founded in 1930. Pool Comense is the competition's most successful club with fifteen championships, followed by AS Vicenza with twelve and Geas Basket with seven, while PF Schio and Cras Taranto have been the leading teams in recent years.

Currently both the champion and runner-up are granted spots in EuroLeague Women. The Serie A champions were the major force in the 1980s, with Geas Basket, Fiat Torino, AS Vicenza, Libertas Trogylos, Polisportiva Ahena and Pool Comense winning eleven editions between 1978 and 1995.

== Current teams ==
| Team | City | Arena | capacity | Colours |
|---|---|---|---|---|
| Alpo Villafranca | Villafranca di Verona | Palazzetto Dello Sport Villafranca Di Verona | 1,400 | |
| Battipaglia | Battipaglia | Palasport Bruno Zauli | 1,200 | |
| BCC Derthona | Castelnuovo Scrivia | PalaCamagna | | |
| Brixia Basket | San Paolo, Lombardy | PalaLeonessa | 5,200 | |
| Dinamo Sassari | Sassari | PalaSerradimigni | 5,000 | |
| Faenza | Faenza | PalaBubani | 800 | |
| Famila Schio | Schio | Palasport Livio Romar | 2,700 | |
| Geas Basket | Sesto San Giovanni | Palacarzaniga | 800 | |
| Magnolia Campobasso | Campobasso | PalaLupe | 400 | |
| Reyer Venezia | Venice | Palasport Taliercio | 3,509 | |
| San Martino di Lupari | San Martino di Lupari | PalaLupe | 400 | |

== List of champions ==
=== Performance by club ===
| Club | Winners | Winning years |
|---|---|---|
| Comense | 15 | 1950, 1951, 1952, 1953, 1991, 1992, 1993, 1994, 1995, 1996, 1997, 1998, 1999, 2002, 2004 |
| Vicenza | 12 | 1965, 1966, 1967, 1968, 1969, 1982, 1983, 1984, 1985, 1986, 1987, 1988 |
| Schio | 12 | 2005, 2006, 2008, 2011, 2013, 2014, 2015, 2016, 2018, 2019, 2022, 2023 |
| Geas | 8 | 1970, 1971, 1972, 1974, 1975, 1976, 1977, 1978 |
| Ginnastica Triestina | 5 | 1930, 1931, 1956, 1957, 1958 |
| Torino | 5 | 1962, 1963, 1964, 1979, 1980 |
| Canottieri | 4 | 1933, 1934, 1935, 1943 |
| Ambrosiana | 4 | 1936, 1937, 1938, 1939 |
| Bernocchi | 4 | 1947, 1948, 1954, 1955 |
| Cras Taranto | 4 | 2003, 2009, 2010, 2012 |
| Udinese | 3 | 1959, 1960, 1961 |
| Reyer Venezia | 3 | 1946, 2021, 2024 |
| Libertas Trogylos | 2 | 1989, 2000 |
| Gioiosa | 1 | 1932 |
| Ilva Trieste | 1 | 1940 |
| Napoli | 1 | 1941 |
| CUS Milano | 1 | 1942 |
| Indomita | 1 | 1949 |
| Standa | 1 | 1973 |
| Treviso | 1 | 1981 |
| Ahena | 1 | 1990 |
| Parma | 1 | 2001 |
| Vomero | 1 | 2007 |
| Lucca | 1 | 2017 |
