= San Paolo, Lombardy =

San Paolo San Pàol
- Comune
- Comune di San Paolo
- Coat of arms

- Location within Italy Location within Lombardy
- Coordinates: 45°22′N 10°2′E
- Country: Italy
- Region: Lombardy
- Province: Province of Brescia (BS)
- Frazioni: Pedergnaga, Oriano, Scarpizzolo, Cremezzano

Government
  - Mayor: Insert Mayor

Area
  - Total: 18 km^{2} (6.9 sq mi)
- Elevation: 77 m (253 ft)

Population (2011)
  - Total: 4,582
  - Density: 250/km^{2} (660/sq mi)
- Demonym: Sampaolesi
- Time zone: UTC+1 (CET)
  - Summer (DST): UTC+2 (CEST)
- Postal code: 25020
- Dialing code: 030
- Website: Official website

San Paolo (Italian for "Saint Paul") is a comune in the Province of Brescia, in the Italian region Lombardy.
