= Taranto Cras Basket =

Italian women's basketball team

- Leagues: Serie A
- Founded: 1961
- Arena: Palazzeto dello Sport Valentino Mazzola
- Location: Taranto, Italy
- Team colors: Red and blue
- President: Angelo Basile
- Head coach: Roberto Ricchini
- Championships: 4 Italian Leagues; 2 Italian Cups; 3 Italian Supercups
- Website: tarantocrasbasket.com
Home	Away

Taranto Cras Basket is an Italian women's basketball club from Taranto. Cras is an acronym from Centro Ricreativo d'Attività Sportive.

Cras Taranto has won the Italian championship in 2003, 2009, 2010 and 2012. It reached the final of the 2009 Eurocup, lost to Galatasaray SK, and it made its debut in the Euroleague the following year. Its best result to date was reaching the quarterfinals in 2011.

== Titles ==
- Serie A
  - 2003, 2009, 2010, 2012
- Coppa Italia
  - 2003, 2012
- Suppercopa
  - 2003, 2009, 2010

== 2011-12 squad ==
- (Lithuania) Gintarė Petronytė (1.96)
- (Italy) Sara Giauro (1.90)
- (France) Nicole Antibe (1.87)
- (United States) Megan Mahoney (1.85)
- (Italy) Abiola Wabara (1.83)
- (Italy) Valentina Siccardi (1.82)
- (Italy) Ilaria Zanoni (1.80)
- (Italy) Stella Panella (1.77)
- (Israel) Liron Cohen (1.73)
- (Italy) Giulia Gatti (1.68)
