= WBC Dynamo Kyiv =

Ukrainian basketball team

Women's basketball team Dynamo Kyiv (Dynamo NPU Kyiv) is a successful Ukrainian women's basketball team. Established in the 1950s, this is the only team from Ukraine who became a champion of the USSR. Dynamo Kyiv is also the only team from Ukraine that has won a European tournament. After the collapse of the USSR, the team continued its participation in the Ukrainian Women's Basketball Championship.

== Awards ==
Soviet Women's Basketball Championship (3):

- 1949, 1991, 1992
  - 1945

Ukrainian Women's Basketball SuperLeague (8):

- 1992, 1993, 1994, 1995, 1996, 2012, 2013, 2015
  - 1997, 2001, 2002, 2010
    - 1999

Ronchetti Cup (1):

- 1988

EuroLeague Women:

- 1992
