= Liliana Ronchetti =

Italian basketball player (1927–1974)

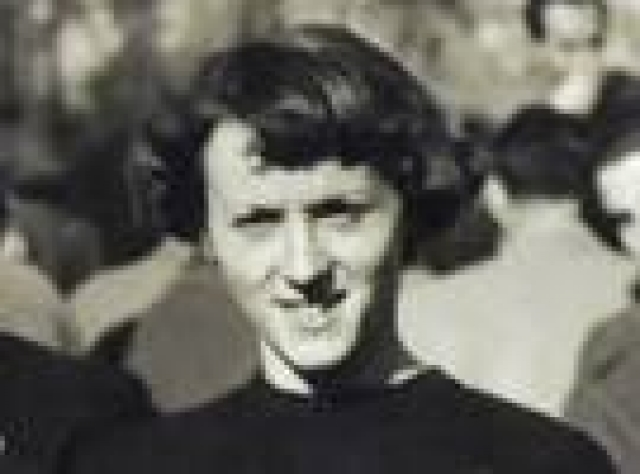
- Liliana Ronchetti in the 1960s

Personal information
- Born: 15 February 1927 Como, Italy
- Died: 4 February 1974 (aged 46)
- Listed height: 1.71 m (5 ft 7 in)

Career information
- Playing career: 1947–1973
- Position: Shooting guard

Career history
- 1947–1955: Società Ginnastica Comense
- 1955–1956: Bernocchi Legnano
- 1956–1957: Autonomi Torino
- 1957–1958: Chlorodont Milano
- 1958–1965: Standa Milano
- 1965–1966: Zaiss Milano
- 1966–1971: Ri.Ri Mendrisio
- 1971–1973: Ignis Varese
- FIBA Hall of Fame

Liliana Ronchetti (15 September 1927 – 4 February 1974) was an Italian basketball player.

== Background ==
On club level, Ronchetti played for Società Ginnastica Comense (1947–55, won the Italian League in 1950, 1951 (undefeated season), 1952 (undefeated season) and 1953, was the league's top scorer in 1952, 1953 and 1954), Bernocchi Legnano (1955–1956), Autonomi Torino (1956–57), Chlorodont Milano (1957–1958), Standa Milano (1958–65, was the league's top scorer in 1960), Zaiss Milano (1965–66), Ri.Ri Mendrisio (1966–71, won the Swiss League in 1967, 1968 and 1969) and Ignis Varese (1971–73).

Ronchetti scored 51 points in a game once while playing for Comense, that is the record high for an Italian women's league. She played 83 games for the Italy women's national basketball team, participating in Eurobasket Women in 1952, 1954, 1956, 1958, 1960 and 1962.

After her sudden death only a year after Ronchetti retired, the FIBA named the Ronchetti Cup in her honour. In 2007, she was enshrined in the FIBA Hall of Fame.
