= EuroCup Women =

FIBA EuroCup Women
- Organising body: FIBA Europe
- Founded: 2002; 24 years ago
- Region: Europe
- Number of teams: 48 (group stage); 53 (total)
- Current champions: (Turkey) Çukurova Basketbol (1 championship)
- Most championships: (Russia) Dynamo Moscow (3 titles)
- Website: EuroCup women
- 2026–27 EuroCup Women

The EuroCup Women (officially FIBA EuroCup Women) is the second-level basketball competition with teams from associate members of FIBA Europe. It succeeds the Ronchetti Cup.

Unlike the EuroCup Men, the competition is entirely organized by FIBA Europe, just like EuroLeague Women

== System of competition ==
As for the EuroLeague Women, the EuroCup had a Final Four to appoint the winner from 2003 (year of creation) to 2005. In 2006, this system is abandoned and we go back to the former format of the Ronchetti Cup, that is to say a final in a home and away game.

== Results ==
Year	Host	Final			Semifinalists		
Year	Host	Winner	Score	Runner-up	Third place	Score	Fourth place
2002–03; Details	Russia (Samara)	(France); Pays d'Aix-en-Provence	80–71	(Spain); CB Islas Canarias	(Russia); VBM-SGAU	84–70	(Greece); Ano Liosia
2003–04; Details	Turkey (Istanbul)	(Russia); Baltiyskaya Zvezda St. Petersburg	68–64	(Hungary); Szolnoki MÁV Coop	(Russia); Dynamo Moscow	76–72	(Turkey); Fenerbahçe
2004–05; Details	Italy (Naples)	(Italy); Phard Napoli	53–45	(Turkey); Fenerbahçe	(Israel); Anda Ramat Hasharon	86–72	Croatia Zagreb
2005–06; Details	2 matches played in the final	(Russia); Spartak Moscow Region	152–131; 80–65 / 72–66	(France); Pays d'Aix-en-Provence	(Spain) Avenida and (Italy) Coconuda Maddaloni		
2006–07; Details	2 matches played in the final	(Russia); Dynamo Moscow	150–117; 74–61 / 76–56	(Italy); CA Faenza	(Italy) Lavezzini Parma and (Russia) Dynamo Moscow Region		
2007–08; Details	2 matches played in the final	(Italy); Beretta Famila Schio	165–136; 87–67 / 78–69	(Russia); BC Moscow	(Turkey) Galatasaray and (Israel) Elitzur Ramla		
2008–09; Details	2 matches played in the final	(Turkey); Galatasaray	137–128; 55–67 / 82–61	(Italy); Cras Basket Taranto	(Russia) Dynamo Kursk and (Russia) Dynamo Moscow		
2009–10; Details	2 matches played in the final	(Greece); Athinaikos	118–114; 65–57 / 53–57	(Russia); Nadezhda Orenburg	(Russia) Dynamo Kursk and (Germany) Saarlouis Royals		
2010–11; Details	2 matches played in the final	(Israel); Elitzur Ramla	122–114; 61–61 / 61–53	(France); ASPTT Arras	(Greece) Athinaikos and (Russia) Chevakata		
2011–12; Details	2 matches played in the final	(Russia); Dynamo Kursk	130–121; 55–69 / 75–52	(Turkey); Kayseri Kaski SK	(Russia) Chevakata and (Turkey) Botaş		
2012–13; Details	2 matches played in the final	(Russia); Dynamo Moscow	136–135; 66–61 / 70–74	(Turkey); Kayseri Kaski SK	(Russia) Chevakata and (Slovakia) Ružomberok		
2013–14; Details	2 matches played in the final	(Russia); Dynamo Moscow	158–150; 97–65 / 61–85	(Russia); Dynamo Kursk	(France) Villeneuve-d'Ascq and (Turkey) İstanbul Üniversitesi		
2014–15; Details	2 matches played in the final	(France); ESB Villeneuve-d'Ascq	137–121; 64–68 / 73–53	(Belgium); Royal Castors Braine	(Israel) Maccabi Bnot Ashdod and (Turkey) İstanbul Üniversitesi		
2015–16; Details	2 matches played in the final	(France); Tango Bourges Basket	105–93; 51–40 / 54–53	(France); ESB Villeneuve-d'Ascq	(Turkey) AGÜ Spor and (France) Basket Landes		
2016–17; Details	2 matches played in the final	(Turkey); Yakın Doğu Üniversitesi	136–127; 73–69 / 63–58	(Turkey); Bellona AGÜ	(Turkey) Hatay BB and (Turkey) Galatasaray		
2017–18; Details	2 matches played in the final	(Turkey); Galatasaray	155–140; 90–68 / 65–72	(Italy); Reyer Venezia	(Turkey) Hatay BB and (Spain) Perfumerías Avenida		
2018–19; Details	2 matches played in the final	(Russia); Nadezhda Orenburg	146–132; 71–75 / 75–57	(France); Lattes Montpellier	(Italy) Famila Schio and (Spain) Spar CityLift Girona		
2019–20; Details	Curtailed and voided due to the COVID-19 pandemic in Europe						
2020–21; Details	Hungary (Szekszárd)	(Spain); Valencia Basket	82–81	(Italy); Reyer Venezia	(Hungary); Atomerőmű KSC Szekszárd	68–55	(France); Flammes Carolo Basket
2021–22; Details	France (Bourges)	(France); Tango Bourges Basket	74–38	(Italy); Umana Reyer Venezia	(Turkey); Galatasaray	75–67	(Turkey); CBK Mersin Yenisehir Bld
2022–23; Details	Two-legs final	(France); LDLC ASVEL Féminin	180–113; 95–56 / 85–57	(Turkey); Galatasaray	(Italy) Umana Reyer Venezia and (France) Villeneuve-d'Ascq		
2023–24; Details	Two-legs final	(United Kingdom); London Lions	149–145; 68–75 / 81–70	(Turkey); Beşiktaş	(Italy) Umana Reyer Venezia and (Spain) Spar Girona		
2024–25; Details	Two-legs final	(France); Villeneuve-d'Ascq	162–145; 78–75 / 84–70	(Spain); Baxi Ferrol	(France) LDLC ASVEL Féminin and (Hungary) Sopron Basket		
2025–26; Details	Two-legs final	(Turkey); ÇBK Mersin	160–157; 85–80 / 75–77	(Greece); Athinaikos	(France) Villeneuve-d'Ascq and (France) Basket Lattes		

== Performances ==
=== By country ===
Country	Titles	Runner-up	Finals
Russia	7	3	10
France	6	4	10
Turkey	4	6	10
Italy	2	5	7
Spain	1	2	3
United Kingdom	1	0	1
Greece	1	1	2
Israel	1	0	1
Hungary	0	1	1
Belgium	0	1	1

=== By club ===
Rank	Club	Country	Titles	Runner-up
1	Dynamo Moscow	Russia	3	0
2	Galatasaray	Turkey	2	1
2	ESB Villeneuve-d'Ascq	France	2	1
4	Tango Bourges Basket	France	2	0
5	Aix-en-Provence	France	1	1
5	Athinaikos	Greece	1	1
5	Dynamo Kursk	Russia	1	1
5	Nadezhda Orenburg	Russia	1	1
8	Yakın Doğu Üniversitesi	Turkey	1	0
8	Baltiyskaia Zvezda Saint Petersburg	Russia	1	0
8	Spartak Moscow	Russia	1	0
8	ÇBK Mersin	Turkey	1	0
8	Beretta Famila Schio	Italy	1	0
8	Phard Napoli	Italy	1	0
8	Elitzur Ramla	Israel	1	0
8	Valencia Basket	Spain	1	0
8	ASVEL Féminin	France	1	0
8	London Lions	United Kingdom	1	0
18	Kayseri Basketbol	Turkey	0	3
18	Reyer Venezia	Italy	0	3
20	BC Moscow Region	Russia	0	1
20	CA Faenza	Italy	0	1
20	Taranto Cras Basket	Italy	0	1
20	Beşiktaş	Turkey	0	1
20	Fenerbahçe	Turkey	0	1
20	ASPTT Arras	France	0	1
20	Islas Canarias	Spain	0	1
20	Szolnoki MÁV Coop	Hungary	0	1
20	Royal Castors Braine	Belgium	0	1
20	Lattes Montpellier	France	0	1

== See also ==
Men's competitions

- EuroLeague
- Basketball Champions League
- EuroCup Basketball
- FIBA Europe Cup
- EuroLeague SuperCup
- European North Basketball League

Women's competitions

- EuroLeague Women
- SuperCup Women
- European Women's Basketball League
