= Pays d'Aix Basket 13 =

French basketball club

- Leagues: LFB
- Founded: 1952
- Arena: La Pioline
- Location: Aix-en-Provence, France
- Team colors: Red and yellow
- President: Guy Boillon
- Head coach: Bruno Blier
- Championships: 1 Eurocup; 1 French cup
- Website: paysaixbasket13.free.fr
Home	Away

Pays d'Aix Basket 13 is a French women's basketball club from Aix-en-Provence, currently playing in the LFB. Originally established in 1952 as ASPTT Aix-en-Provence, it took its current name in 2004.

The club's first major success was reaching the 1998 Ronchetti Cup's final, lost to Gysev Sopron. Two years later it won its first title, the 2000 national cup, and in 2003 it won the new FIBA Eurocup, which succeeded the Ronchetti Cup, beating CB Islas Canarias in the final. It again reached the Eurocup's final in 2006, but lost to Spartak Moscow Region.

== Titles ==
- FIBA Eurocup (1)
  - 2003
- Coupe de France (1)
  - 2000

== 2012-13 roster ==
- (1.96) (Australia) Marianna Tolo
- (1.92) (Australia) Cayla Francis
- (1.85) (France) Viviane Adjutor
- (1.85) (France) Natty Chambertin
- (1.85) (Canada) Lizanne Murphy
- (1.80) (France) Kelly Corre
- (1.78) (France) Adja Konteh
- (1.78) (Canada) Shona Thorburn
- (1.76) (France) Sylvie Gruszczynski
- (1.69) (France) Lisa Lefevre
