= WBC Lokomotiv Sofia =

Women's basketball club

WBC Lokomotiv Sofia (Bulgarian: ВБК „Локомотив София“) are a Bulgarian women's basketball club based in the capital Sofia and part of the Lokomotiv Sofia sports club.

In 1971–72 FIBA Women's European Cup Winners' Cup Lokomotiv lose at semifinal of Ronchetti Cup.

== Honours ==
- Bulgarian Championships: (7) 1948,1949,1950,1951,1952,1967,1991
- Bulgarian Cup:(4) 1951,1954,1965,1968

== See also ==
- BC Lokomotiv Sofia
- Lokomotiv RFC
- PFC Lokomotiv Sofia
