= SD Željezničar =

SD Željezničar is the second largest association of sport clubs with the same name in Bosnia and Herzegovina. The largest one is USD Bosna. It was founded in 1921 by a group of railway workers as RŠD (Radničko športsko društvo, eng. Workers' sports society) Željezničar, but after the World War II initial acronym was changed to SD.

== Football ==
When it was founded in 1921 its first member was football club FK Željezničar. FK Željezničar is the most prominent member of this association. They have managed to win one championship title in former Yugoslavia in 1972, and six more titles in the independent Bosnia and Herzegovina (1998, 2001, 2002, 2010, 2012, 2013). Six more Bosnian cup titles were added. The club's biggest international result was recorded in 1985 when they have reached the UEFA Cup semi-final.

SD Željezničar does not yet have a women's football club as there is no big demand for it. Not to be confused with ŽNK Željezničar 2011 from Bosanska Krupa. The local rival women's club in the country is SFK 2000.

== Handball ==
Rukometni klub (eng. Handball club) Željezničar was one of the leading Bosnian handball clubs in former Yugoslavia, along with RK Borac Banja Luka. They have won the championship title in 1978. and reached the final of EHF Cup in 1982 integrating also foreigners and French players such as Herman Müller and Sylvain Annonier, where they have lost to Gummersbach. In independent Bosnia, they managed to win the war championship in 1993, but never actually established themselves as a title winning team. They were close to the top, but with no championship or cup titles (losing finalists). Club played in competitions organized by EHF on several occasions. However, club was relegated due to financial problems. After a couple of seasons, in 2006, they have been promoted to the top flight, but for one season only, since then they have been relegated again.

Women's handball club had more success in Bosnian era. They won three cup titles in 1996, 1999. and 2002, but not yet won a championship. Club's headquarters are in Hadžići, small town near Sarajevo. They play their home matches there and they are also a regular participant in European club competitions.

== Basketball ==
Basketball is the second most popular sport in Bosnia and Herzegovina. Košarkaški klub (eng. Basketball club) Željezničar for men no longer exists. It was one of the best Bosnian clubs in the 1960s and 1970s, but in the 1980s it ceased to exist. In the overall Yugoslav championship table 1946–1991, they occupied 24th place. They spent six seasons in top flight.

On the other side, the women's club won the Yugoslav championship (in which they were regular participants) in 1971. They also managed to reach the Yugoslav Basketball Cup final in 1988 and 1989. However, their best results came in independent Bosnia and Herzegovina. They won the Bosnian championship title 9 times, Bosnian cup 8 times and WABA League in 2003.

- Champions of Yugoslavia (1) - 1971.
- Champions of Bosnia and Herzegovina (11) - 1998, 1999, 2002, 2003, 2004, 2005, 2006, 2007, 2008, 2009, 2010.
- Cup of Bosnia-Herzegovina winners (9) - 1998, 1999, 2003, 2004, 2005, 2006, 2007, 2008, 2010.
- WABA League (1) - 2003.

National League Winners (12):- 1971, 1998, 1999, 2002, 2003, 2004, 2005, 2006, 2007, 2008, 2009, 2010. There were three separated league and cup competitions in Bosnia and Herzegovina before the 2002/2003 season and, before that season, only several joint play-offs were played to determine one final champion or cup winner. KK Željezničar also won four championship and four cup titles in one of those regions.

- Regional champions (4) - 1998, 1999, 2000, 2001.
- Regional Cup winners (4) - 1998, 1999, 2000, 2001.

== Other sports ==
Other clubs, members of SD Željezničar are:

- Šahovski klub (Chess club), ”ŠK “Željezničar” Sarajevo, traditionally one of the best in the country;
- Skijaški klub (Skiing club), the best in the country;
- Klub dizača tegova (Weightlifting club), one of the best in the country;
- Kuglaški klub (Bowling club), one of the best in the country;
- Odbojkaški klub (Volleyball club)
- Stonoteniski klub (Table tennis club);
- Judo klub (Judo club);
- Streljački klub (Shooting sports club)

Shooting club Željezničar is one of the eldest members, since 1948, with best results in BiH;

- Planinarsko društvo (Mountaineering society);

Before the war, there were more of them, but it is possible they will be reestablished again. These are the clubs, beside men's basketball and women's football, which no longer exist:

- Atletski klub (Track and field club);
- Auto-moto klub (Auto racing club);
- Bokserski klub (Boxing club);
- Bob i sankaški klub (Bobsleigh and Luge club);
- Hrvački klub (Wrestling club);

== Supporters ==
SD Željezničar has supporters across Bosnia and Herzegovina. Most are concentrated on football, but other clubs within the association also have followings. The organized supporters are called The Maniacs. Handball and basketball are the most popular indoor sports.

Since there is no men's basketball club Željezničar anymore, supporters of The Maniacs and their rivals Horde Zla can sometimes be found together cheering for KK Bosna Royal.
