= Unicar Cesena =

Italian basketball team

- Dissolved: 1997
- Location: Cesena, Italy
- Championships: 1 Lega Basket Femminile; 1 Euroleague Women; 1 Ronchetti Cup

Unicar Cesena was an Italian women's basketball team from Cesena. The team won Lega Basket Femminile (season 1989-1990) and the EuroLeague Women in the 1990-91 season and the 1993–94 Ronchetti Cup. The team was dissolved in 1997.

In 1990, the team was the national champion of Italy, winning the final against Pool Comense. The Cesena team subsequently played the final against Pool Comense in 1991, 1992, 1993, 1994 and 1996.

On 10 October 1996, during an EuroLeague Women match against MiZo-Pécsi VSK, Victoria Bullet scored 48 points, the record of the EuroLeague as of 2024.

== Titles ==
- 1 Lega Basket Femminile (1990)
- 1 EuroLeague Women (1991)
- 1 Ronchetti Cup (1994)
