= BC Orchies =

- Nickname: BCO
- Leagues: NM1
- Founded: 1922
- Arena: Pubeco Pévèle Arena
- Capacity: 5,000
- Location: Orchies, France
- Team colors: Blue, White
- President: Ludovic Rohart
- Head coach: Philippe Namyst
- Website: basketcluborchies.com

Basket Club d'Orchies or just BC Orchies is a basketball club based in Orchies, France that plays in the NM1.

== Results ==
Season	Tier	League	Pos.	Postseason	French Cup	European competitions
2010–11	3	Nationale 1	11	–	Last 32	–
2011–12	3	Nationale 1	3	Semifinalist	Last 32	–
2012–13	3	Nationale 1	1	Champion ▲ ^{Promoted}	Last 32	–
2013–14	2	LNB Pro B	17	Relegated	Last 32	–

Last updated: 29 November 2014.
Source: Eurobasket

== Notable players ==
Note: Flags indicate national team eligibility at FIBA-sanctioned events. Players may hold other non-FIBA nationalities not displayed.

Criteria

To appear in this section a player must have either:

- Set a club record or won an individual award while at the club
- Played at least one official international match for their national team at any time
- Played at least one official NBA match at any time.

- (Bulgaria) Vassil Evtimov 1 season: '13-'14
- (United States) DeJuan Wright 1 year: 2013
- (United States) Marc Salyers 1 year: 2013
