= Stade Français (basketball) =

French basketball team

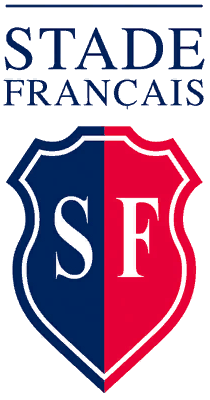
- Leagues: Regional league
- Founded: 1920; 106 years ago (section)
- Arena: Paris
- Team colors
Home

Stade Français Basket is the basketball section of French multi-sports club Stade Français, which is based in Paris. The club was established in 1920, and it currently has 23 teams competing in different categories, with the main two being women's teams, in the national championships of France.

== Men's basketball ==
The men's teams currently include Under-20, Under-17, Under-15 and Under-13 divisions, which compete in regional championships.

=== Titles ===
- Ligue Nationale
  - 1921, 1927

=== Men's players ===
Note: Flags indicate national team eligibility at FIBA-sanctioned events. Players may hold other non-FIBA nationalities not displayed.

Criteria

To appear in this section a player must have either:

- Set a club record or won an individual award while at the club
- Played at least one official international match for their national team at any time
- Played at least one official NBA match at any time.

- (France) Hervé Dubuisson

=== Men's head coaches ===
- (Romania) Mihai Nedef
- (United States) Bill Sweek

== Women's basketball ==
The club's women's teams have the most significant achievements for the club, as they won six French national championships in the 1980s, including five titles in a row. They were also a regular participant in the Euroleague Women. In 1985, the club moved to nearby Versailles, competing as "Union Stade Français Versailles", until it was disestablished in 1989.

=== Titles ===
- Ligue Nationale
  - 1980, 1983, 1984, 1985, 1986, 1987
- Coupe de France
  - 1982, 1983, 1985

== See also ==
- Stade Français football
- Stade Français rugby
