= Dynamo Moscow (women's basketball) =

Russian professional women's basketball club

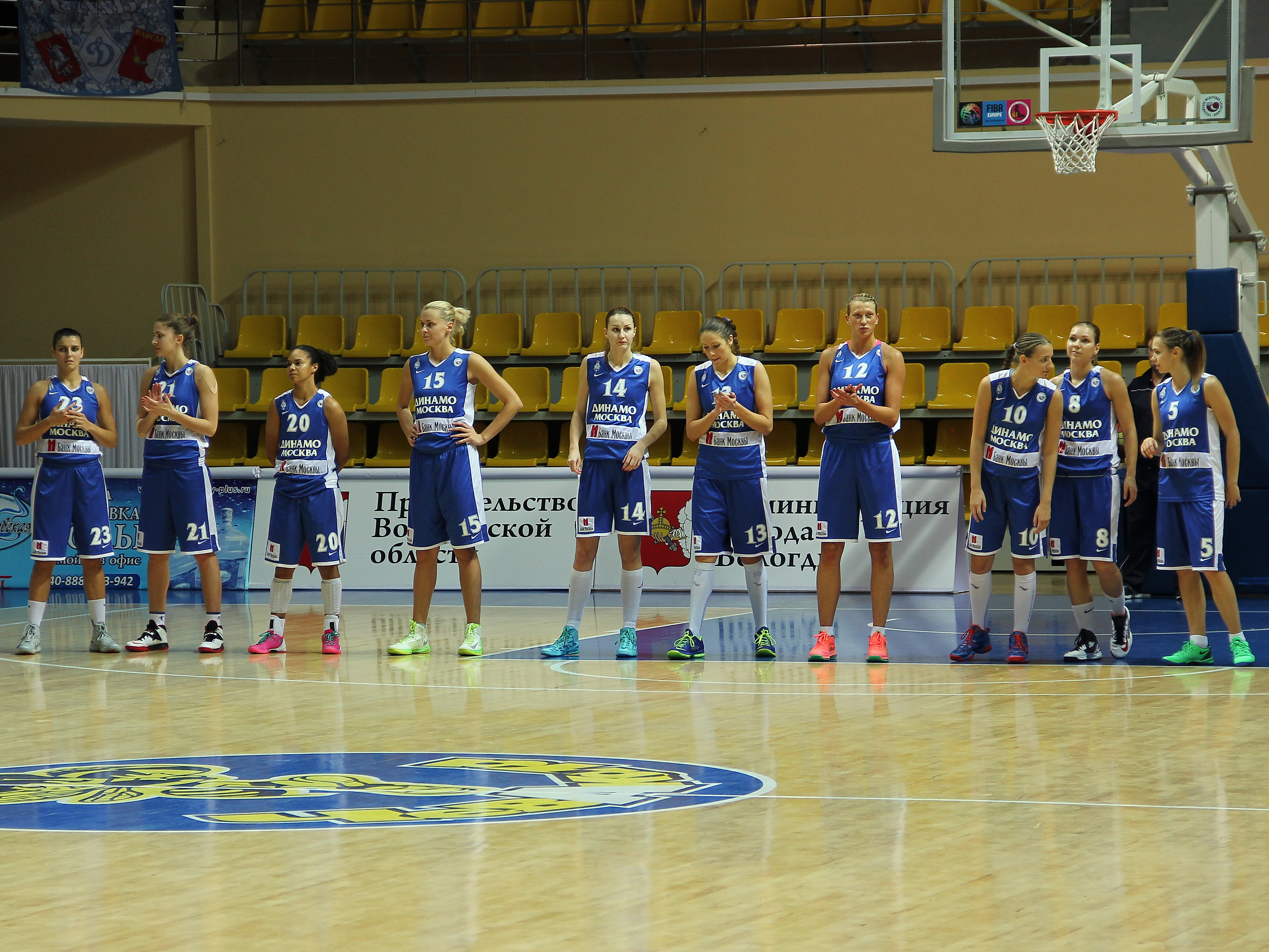
The team pictured before a game.

WBC Dynamo Moscow (Russian: ЖБК Динамо Москва) is a Russian professional women's basketball club playing in the Russian Premier League. Founded in 1923, in the early stages of the Soviet Championship, it won its first 6 seasons and 5 more titles up to 1958. Dynamo culminated this era reaching in 1959 the final of the inaugural edition of the European Cup, which they lost to Slavia Sofia.

Four decades later Dynamo emerged briefly as the leading Russian team, winning four Russian Championships in a row and reaching the Euroleague's Final Four in 2000. While the team gradually declined in subsequent years, in 2007 it won the EuroCup, its first international FIBA trophy.

== Personnel and staff ==
- Tatiana Nikolaevna Ovechkina serves as the president
- Potapov Andrey Valerievich serves as head coach
- Zhigil Vladimir Vladimirovich serves as an assistant coach

== Honours ==
- FIBA EuroCup: 2007, 2013, 2014
- USSR Championship: 1937, 1938, 1939, 1940, 1944, 1945, 1948, 1950, 1953, 1957, 1958
- Russian Super League A: 1998, 1999, 2000, 2001

== Former players ==
(Russia) Svetlana Abrosimova; (Russia) Ilona Korstin; (Russia) Oxana Rakhmatulina; (Russia) Tatiana Shchegoleva	(Russia) Natalia Vodopyanova; (Spain) Nuria Martínez; (Latvia) Anete Jēkabsone-Žogota; (United States) Seimone Augustus	(United States) Rebekkah Brunson; (United States) Crystal Langhorne; (Serbia) Ana Dabović
