= BAC Mirande =

French women's basketball club

Basket Astarac Mirande was a French women's basketball club from Mirande. Founded in 1975, it won three national championships between 1988 and 1990, appearing in the European Cup. It was disestablished in 1997.

== Titles ==
- Nationale Féminine 1A
  - 1988, 1989, 1990
