= WBC Spartak Noginsk =

Female basketball team from Noginsk

Spartak Noginsk
- Leagues: Russian Premier League
- Founded: 1949
- Arena: Znamya Sports Hall
- Location: Noginsk, Russia
- Team colors: Red
- President: Vladimir Leptev
- Head coach: Sergey Erofeyev
- Website: spartaknoginsk.ucoz.com
Home	Away

WBC Spartak Noginsk is a Russian women's basketball club from Noginsk, Moscow Oblast founded in 1949. During the Soviet era it was the women's basketball section of Spartak Moscow. The team between 1977 and 1982 won three Ronchetti Cups and one Soviet Championship. It played one further Ronchetti Cup final in 1983, and it was the championship's runner-up in seven occasions between 1968 and 1982, second to Daugava Riga.

Following the collapse of the Soviet Union the team was relocated from Moscow to nearby Podolsk and changed its name, competing in the new Russian Premier League as Concern Podolsk. In 1997 it settled in Noginsk, changing its name to Spartakademklub, which was subsequently shortened to Spartak. The team was a regular participant in the FIBA EuroCup Women, first entering the competition in the 2008–09 season. Following the Russian invasion of Ukraine, Russian clubs were barred from registering for the EuroLeague Women and EuroCup Women for the 2022–23 season.

== Titles ==
- Ronchetti Cup
  - 1977, 1981, 1982
- Soviet Championship
  - 1978
