= WBC Minyor Pernik =

WBC Minyor Pernik is a women's basketball club from Pernik.

Having won the national championship for the first time in 1972, Minyor Pernik enjoyed its golden era between 1977 and 1982, winning four national championships and three national cups and reaching the final of the 1977 Ronchetti Cup and the 1980 and 1982 European Cups, lost respectively to Spartak Moscow, FIAT Torino and Daugava Riga. The team subsequently won two more cups in the late-1980s and a final sixth championship in 1996.

Currently Minyor Pernik plays in the national second tier.

== Titles ==
- Bulgarian Championship(6)
  - 1972, 1977, 1978, 1979, 1981, 1996
- Bulgarian Cup(5)
  - 1978, 1979, 1981, 1988, 1990
- European Cups(2) Runners-up: (1980, 1982)
- Ronchetti Cup(1) Runners-up: (1977)

== 2011-12 Roster ==
- (1.87) (Bulgaria) Ralitsa Vasileva
- (1.80) (Bulgaria) Reneta Dikova
- (1.80) (Bulgaria) Petya Dimitrova
- (1.80) (Bulgaria) Valeria Ivanova
- (1.71) (Bulgaria) Polina Vasileva
- (1.70) (Bulgaria) Boyka Zareva
- (1.69) (Bulgaria) Maria Boycheva
- (?.??) (Bulgaria) Adriana Boyanova
- (?.??) (Bulgaria) Marie-Katrin Chokoeva
- (?.??) (Bulgaria) Nadya Trichkova
