= A.S. Vicenza =

Italian basketball team

- Leagues: Serie B
- Founded: 1958
- Arena: Palasport Comunale
- Location: Vicenza, Italy
- Team colors: White and red
- President: Mariano FERIANI
- Head coach: Claudio REBELLATO
- Championships: 5 European Cups; 1 Ronchetti Cup; 12 Italian Championships
- Website: www.asvicenza.it
Home	Away

Associazione Sportiva Vicenza is an Italian women's basketball team from Vicenza. Founded in 1958, the team reached Serie A in 1963 and two years later it won the first of its twelve Italian Championships. The team dominated the championship in the second half of the 1960s.

The 1970s were unsuccessful, but the following decade marked the club's golden era, with Vicenza appearing in seven European Cup finals in a row between 1983 and 1989. The team defeated twice Agon 08 Düsseldorf and Dynamo Novosibirsk and once 18-times champion Daugava Riga to win five European Cups, including four consecutive titles. As of 2012 Vicenza remains the competition's most successful team from Western Europe.

The 1989 lost final to Jedinstvo Tuzla was Vicenza's last appearance in the European Cup, but the team still enjoyed a last European success in 1992, winning the Ronchetti Cup. However, the team declined throughout the 1990s and became a yo-yo club, being relegated to Serie A1 in 1996, 2000, 2003 and 2006. The situation worsened critically in 2007 with the team being relegated to 4th-tier Serie C after ending last and receiving an additional relegation for financial trouble. Since 2009 the team has played in 3rd-tier Serie B, most recently ending 7th.

== Titles ==
- 5 European Cups (1983, 1985 — 1988)
- 1 Ronchetti Cup (1992)
- 12 Italian Championships (1965 — 1969, 1982 — 1988)
