= WBC CSKA Moscow =

- League: Russian Premier League
- Founded: 1924; 101 years ago
- Dissolved: 2009; 16 years ago
- Arena: Universal Sports Hall CSKA
- Capacity: 5,500
- Location: Moscow, Russia
- Team colours: Red and blue
- Championships: 1 EuroLeague Women; 4 Worldleague; 3 Ronchetti Cup; 9 Russian Premier League
- Website: http://www.cska.ru/

WBC CSKA Moscow was a Russian women's basketball team from Moscow. The club was competing in the Russian Premier League and FIBA Europe's Euroleague and was one of the most successful clubs of the country.

In 2009 CSKA was disbanded due to financial problems.

== History ==
It represented sports society CSKA Moscow. CSKA was one of the most successful Soviet teams in the 1980s, winning two Ronchetti Cups and two Soviet Championships, and reaching the European Cup's final in 1990. Following the collapse of the Soviet Union the team dominated the new Russian Superleague for much of the 1990s, winning six championships between 1992 and 1997 and a third Ronchetti Cup. However, it declined in the late 1990s and was disbanded in 2001.

In 2006 CSKA Moscow reappeared in the women's basketball scene as 2005 Euroleague champions VBM-SGAU Samara relocated to Moscow and played under its name, crest and colours. However, the club wasn't able to win neither the Euroleague nor the national championship, with Spartak Moscow Region becoming the country's new leading force. CSKA subsequently fell into financial turmoil and was disbanded in October 2009.

== Titles ==
- EuroLeague Women (1): 2005
- FIBA Women's World League (4): 2003, 2004, 2005, 2006–07
- Ronchetti Cup (3): 1985, 1989, 1997
- Soviet Championship (2): 1985, 1989
- Soviet Cup (1): 1978
- Russian Championship (9): 1992, 1993, 1994, 1995, 1996, 1997, 2004, 2005, 2006
- Russian Cup (4): 2004, 2005, 2007, 2008

== Notable players ==
- (United States) (Russia) Becky Hammon
- (Belgium) Ann Wauters
- (United States) Katie Douglas
