= WBC Spartak Saint Petersburg =

Russian women's basketball club

WBC Spartak Saint-Petersburg is a Russian professional women's basketball club from Saint Petersburg, competing in the Russian Women's Basketball Premier League. In 2011 the team was 8th (3rd to last). The club is founded in 1935. In the first half of the 1970s the club won the first four editions of the Ronchetti Cup and the 1974 Soviet Championship.

After the collapse of the Soviet Union team changed its name several times. In 2004 he won the European Cup with the name Baltic star. The Yubileyny Sports Palace serves as Spartak's home ground.

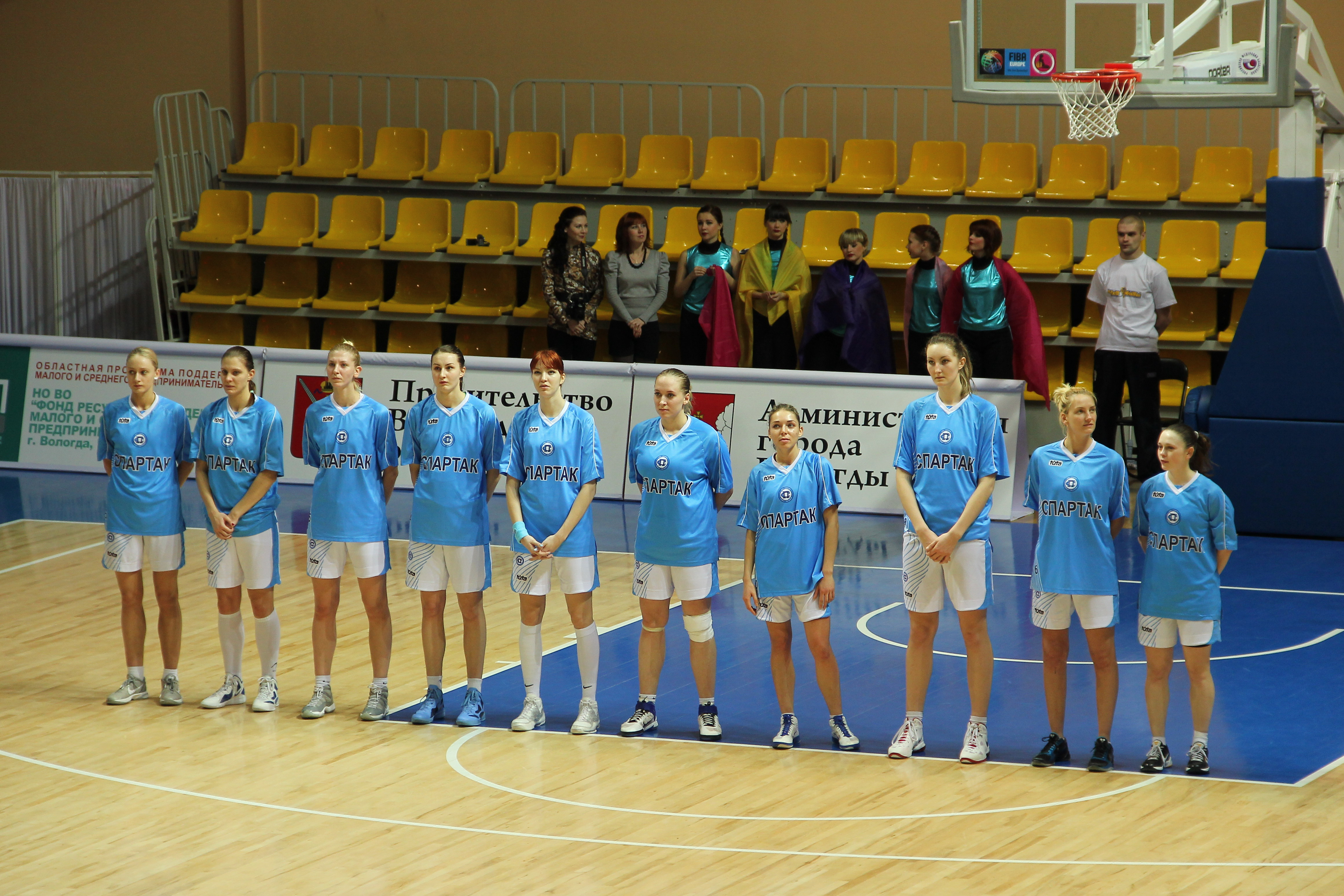
Spartak Saint Petersburg 2012

== Titles ==
- 4 Ronchetti Cups (1972 — 1975)
- 1 Soviet Championship (1974)
- 1 EuroCup Women (2004)
