= USK Praha (women's basketball) =

ZVVZ USK Praha
- League: Czech League
- Founded: 1953
- Arena: Královka Arena
- Capacity: 2,500
- Location: Prague, Czech Republic
- Team colors: Blue and Yellow
- President: Marek Kučera
- Head coach: Martin Bašta
- Championships: 2 Europe SuperCup Women; 2 EuroLeague Women; 1 Ronchetti Cup; 20 National League; 6 National Cup
- Website: uskbasket.cz

USK Praha (official name: ZVVZ USK Praha) is a Czech professional women's basketball club that was founded in 1953 in the city of Prague. USK Praha plays in the Czech League, the highest competition in the Czech Republic. It is a 26-times national champion. On the international scene, the team’s greatest successes have been winning the Ronchetti Cup in the 1975/76 season, the EuroLeague in the 2014/15 and 2024/25 seasons, and the FIBA SuperCup in 2015.

Since 2014, USK Praha’s home is Královka Arena. Before this, the team played at Folimanka hall.

== Honours ==
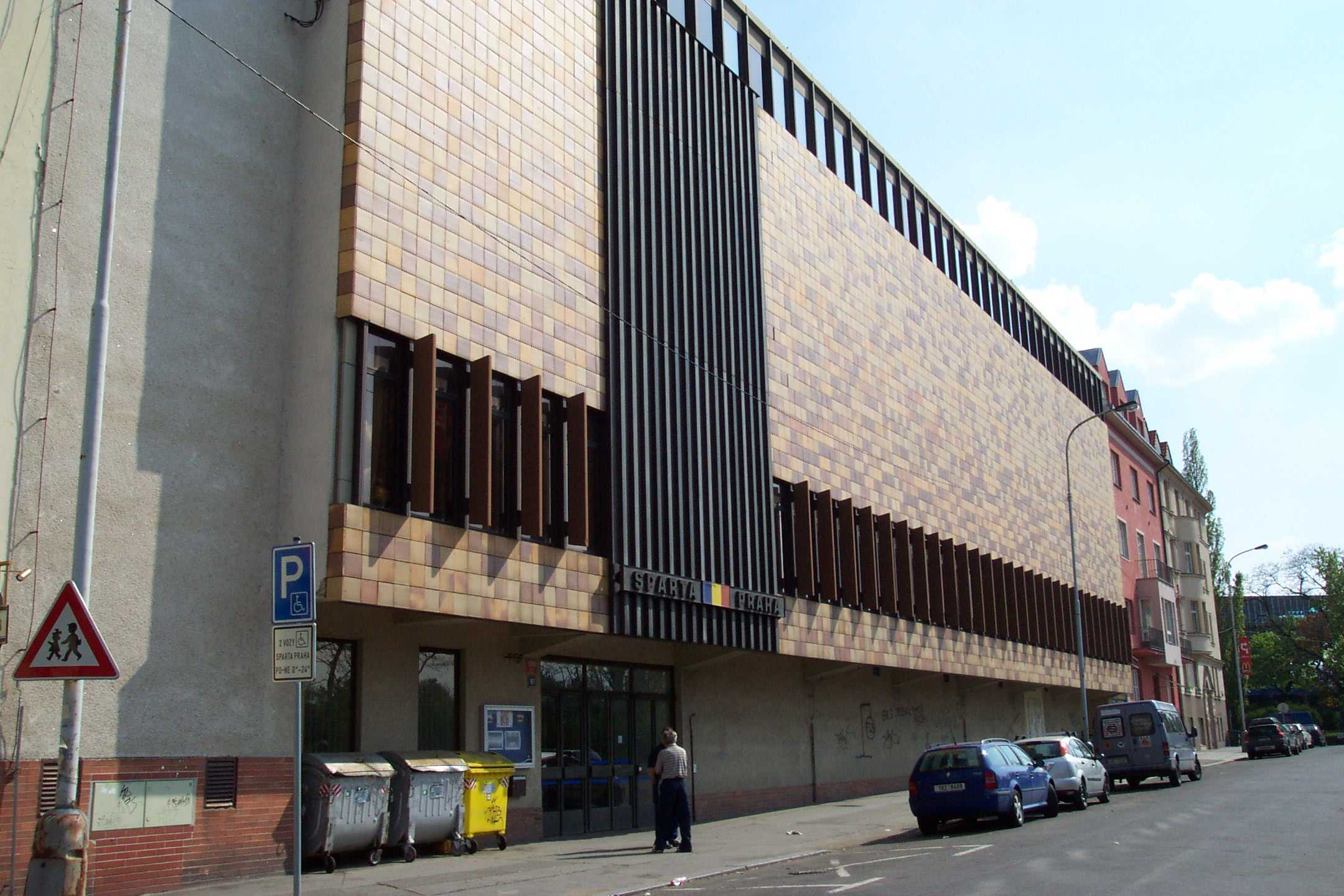
Home arena of USK Praha, Královka Arena

=== Domestic ===
National Championships – 18

- Czechoslovak Women's Basketball Championship:
  - Winners (8) : 1970, 1973, 1982, 1983, 1984, 1985, 1988, 1989
  - Runner up (7) : 1971, 1972, 1975, 1981, 1986, 1987, 1990
- Czech Women's Basketball League:
  - Winners (20) : 1993, 1994, 1995, 2009, 2011, 2012, 2013, 2014, 2015, 2016, 2017, 2018, 2019, 2020, 2021, 2022, 2023, 2024, 2025, 2026
  - Runner up (10) : 1996, 1997, 2001, 2002, 2003, 2005, 2006, 2007, 2008, 2010

National Cups – 6

- Czech Women's Basketball Cup:
  - Winners (6) : 2010, 2011, 2012, 2014, 2015, 2021
  - Runner up (14) : 1996, 1997, 1998, 1999, 2000, 2001, 2002, 2003, 2004, 2005, 2007, 2008, 2009, 2013

=== International ===
International titles –2

- Europe SuperCup Women:
  - Winners (2) : 2015, 2025
- EuroLeague Women:
  - Winners (2) : 2015, 2025
- Ronchetti Cup:
  - Winners (1) : 1976
  - Runner up (1) : 1973
- Triple Crown (1) : 2014–15

== Roster ==
ZVVZ USK Praha roster
Players
Coaches

Pos.	No.	Nat.	Name	Ht.	Age
F	0	(Germany)	Bühner, Frieda	1.86 m (6 ft 1 in)	22 – 28 May 2004
SF	1	(Czech Republic)	Přibylová, Mariana	1.75 m (5 ft 9 in)	21 – 14 April 2005
G	2	(Czech Republic)	Petlanová, Karolína	1.84 m (6 ft 0 in)	21 – 25 January 2005
C	3	(Czech Republic)	Kalná, Kateřina	1.90 m (6 ft 3 in)	19 – 21 March 2007
SG	4	(Czech Republic)	Andělová, Gabriela	1.73 m (5 ft 8 in)	30 – 21 March 1996
G	5	(Spain)	Cazorla, Maite	1.78 m (5 ft 10 in)	29 – 18 June 1997
PG	7	(Czech Republic)	Malíková, Petra	1.78 m (5 ft 10 in)	24 – 9 September 2002
SF	8	(Czech Republic)	Javanská, Eliška	1.81 m (5 ft 11 in)	20 – 1 May 2006
C	13	(France)	Gueye, Aminata	1.91 m (6 ft 3 in)	24 – 10 July 2002
SF	16	(Czech Republic)	Taušová, Karolína	1.85 m (6 ft 1 in)	17 – 11 November 2008
G	18	(France)	Astier, Pauline	1.79 m (5 ft 10 in)	24 – 15 February 2002
G/F	19	(Canada)	Prosper, Cassandre	1.91 m (6 ft 3 in)	21 – 25 June 2005
C	20	(Czech Republic)	Koucká, Natálie	1.90 m (6 ft 3 in)	23 – 7 August 2003
SG	28	(France)	Touré, Mamignan	1.83 m (6 ft 0 in)	31 – 19 December 1994
PF	34	(United States)	Fraser, Brianna	1.91 m (6 ft 3 in)	29 – 22 May 1997

Head coach

- (Czech Republic) Martin Bašta

Assistant coach(es)

- (Czech Republic) Aleš Jiráň
- (Bosnia and Herzegovina) Irena Vrančić

Team manager

- (Czech Republic) Marek Kučera

Legend

- (C) Team captain
- Injured

- Roster
Updated: 30 September 2026

== Notable players ==
- (Australia) Ezi Magbegor
- (Croatia) Ivana Dojkić
- (Czech Republic) Gabriela Andělová
- (Czech Republic) Jana Veselá
- (Czech Republic) Veronika Voráčková
- (Czech Republic) Tereza Vyoralová
- (Spain) Maite Cazorla
- (Spain) María Conde
- (Spain) Laia Palau
- (Spain) Leticia Romero
- (Spain) Marta Xargay
- (France) Pauline Astier
- (France) Valériane Ayayi
- (France) Janelle Salaün
- (United Kingdom) Temi Fágbénlé
- (Germany) Nyara Sabally
- (Greece) Evanthia Maltsi
- (Latvia) Elīna Dikaioulaku
- (Latvia) Anete Šteinberga
- (Montenegro) Milka Bjelica
- (Netherlands) Emese Hof
- (Slovenia) Teja Oblak
- (Serbia) Dragana Stanković
- (Serbia) Sonja Petrović
- (Slovakia) Barbora Wrzesiński
- (Sweden) Elin Eldebrink
- (Sweden) Frida Eldebrink
- (Sweden) Amanda Zahui B.
- (United States) DeWanna Bonner
- (United States) Kaitlyn Chen
- (United States) Candice Dupree
- (United States) Isabelle Harrison
- (United States) Charde Houston
- (United States) Brionna Jones
- (United States) DeLisha Milton Jones
- (United States) Danielle Robinson
- (United States) Alyssa Thomas
- (United States) Makayla Timpson
- (United States) Kia Vaughn
- (United States) Lindsay Whalen

== See also ==
- USK Praha
