= List of EuroLeague Women winning coaches =

Head coaches of clubs that have won the pre-eminent women's basketball league in Europe

The list of EuroLeague Women winning coaches shows all head coaches who won the EuroLeague Women, the top-tier professional basketball club competition in Europe, previously called FIBA Women's European Champions Cup (1958–1996).

== By year ==
Tournament	Head Coach	Winning team
1958–59	(Bulgaria) Dimitar Mitev	(Bulgaria) Slavia Sofia
1959–60	(Soviet Union) Oļģerts Altbergs	(Soviet Union) Daugava Rīga
1960–61	(Soviet Union) Oļģerts Altbergs	(Soviet Union) Daugava Rīga
1961–62	(Soviet Union) Oļģerts Altbergs	(Soviet Union) Daugava Rīga
1962–63	(Bulgaria) Dimitar Mitev	(Bulgaria) Slavia Sofia
1963–64	(Soviet Union) Raimonds Karnitis	(Soviet Union) Daugava Rīga
1964–65	(Soviet Union) Raimonds Karnitis	(Soviet Union) Daugava Rīga
1965–66	(Soviet Union) Raimonds Karnitis	(Soviet Union) Daugava Rīga
1966–67	(Soviet Union) Raimonds Karnitis	(Soviet Union) Daugava Rīga
1967–68	(Soviet Union) Raimonds Karnitis	(Soviet Union) Daugava Rīga
1968–69	(Soviet Union) Raimonds Karnitis	(Soviet Union) Daugava Rīga
1969–70	(Soviet Union) Raimonds Karnitis	(Soviet Union) Daugava Rīga
1970–71	(Soviet Union) Raimonds Karnitis	(Soviet Union) Daugava Rīga
1971–72	(Soviet Union) Raimonds Karnitis	(Soviet Union) Daugava Rīga
1972–73	(Soviet Union) Raimonds Karnitis	(Soviet Union) Daugava Rīga
1973–74	(Soviet Union) Raimonds Karnitis	(Soviet Union) Daugava Rīga
1974–75	(Soviet Union) Raimonds Karnitis	(Soviet Union) Daugava Rīga
1975–76	(Czechoslovakia) Lubomír Dobrý	(Czechoslovakia) Sparta Prague
1976–77	(Soviet Union) Raimonds Karnitis	(Soviet Union) Daugava Rīga
1977–78	(Italy) Dante Gurioli	(Italy) Geas Sesto San Giovanni
1978–79	(Socialist Federal Republic of Yugoslavia) Strahinja Alagić	(Socialist Federal Republic of Yugoslavia) Crvena zvezda
1979–80	(Italy) Bruno Arrigone	(Italy) FIAT Torino
1980–81	(Soviet Union) Raimonds Karnitis	(Soviet Union) Daugava Rīga
1981–82	(Soviet Union) Raimonds Karnitis	(Soviet Union) Daugava Rīga
1982–83	(Italy) Piero Pasini	(Italy) Zolú Vicenza
1983–84	(Bulgaria) Stanislav Boyadzhiev	(Bulgaria) Levski Sofia
1984–85	(Italy) Aldo Corno	(Italy) Fiorella Vicenza
1985–86	(Italy) Aldo Corno	(Italy) Primigi Vicenza
1986–87	(Italy) Aldo Corno	(Italy) Primigi Vicenza
1987–88	(Italy) Aldo Corno	(Italy) Primigi Vicenza
1988–89	(Socialist Federal Republic of Yugoslavia) Mihajlo Vuković	(Socialist Federal Republic of Yugoslavia) Jedinstvo Tuzla
1989–90	(Italy) Santino Coppa	(Italy) Enimont Priolo
1990–91	(Italy) Paolo Rossi	(Italy) Conad Cesena
1991–92	(Federal Republic of Yugoslavia) Mihajlo Vuković	(Spain) Dorna Godella Valencia
1992–93	(Federal Republic of Yugoslavia) Mihajlo Vuković	(Spain) Dorna Godella Valencia
1993–94	(Italy) Aldo Corno	(Italy) SFT Como
1994–95	(Italy) Aldo Corno	(Italy) SFT Como
1995–96	(Germany) Bernd Motte	(Germany) BTV Wuppertal
1996–97	(Russia) Vadim Kapranov	(France) Bourges
1997–98	(Russia) Vadim Kapranov	(France) Bourges
1998–99	(Slovakia) Natália Hejková	(Slovakia) Ružomberok
1999–00	(Slovakia) Natália Hejková	(Slovakia) Ružomberok
2000–01	(France) Olivier Hirsch	(France) Bourges
2001–02	(France) Laurent Buffard	(France) Valenciennes Orchies
2002–03	(Serbia) Zoran Višić	(Russia) UMMC Ekaterinburg
2003–04	(France) Laurent Buffard	(France) Valenciennes Orchies
2004–05	(Russia) Igor Grudin	(Russia) VBM-SGAU Samara
2005–06	(Czech Republic) Jan Bobrovský	(Czech Republic) Gambrinus Sika Brno
2006–07	(Slovakia) Natália Hejková	(Russia) Spartak Moscow Region
2007–08	(Slovakia) Natália Hejková	(Russia) Spartak Moscow Region
2008–09	(Hungary) László Rátgéber	(Russia) Spartak Moscow Region
2009–10	(United States) Pokey Chatman	(Russia) Spartak Moscow Region
2010–11	(Spain) Lucas Mondelo	(Spain) Halcón Avenida Salamanca
2011–12	(Spain) Roberto Íñiguez	(Spain) Ros Casares Valencia
2012–13	(Germany) Olaf Lange	(Russia) UMMC Ekaterinburg
2013–14	(Turkey) Ekrem Memnun	(Turkey) Galatasaray Odeabank
2014–15	(Slovakia) Natália Hejková	(Czech Republic) USK Praha
2015–16	(Germany) Olaf Lange	(Russia) UMMC Ekaterinburg
2016–17	(Spain) Lucas Mondelo	(Russia) Dynamo Kursk
2017–18	(Spain) Miguel Méndez	(Russia) UMMC Ekaterinburg
2018–19	(Spain) Miguel Méndez	(Russia) UMMC Ekaterinburg
2020–21	(Spain) Miguel Méndez	(Russia) UMMC Ekaterinburg
2021–22	(Hungary) Dávid Gáspár	(Hungary) Sopron Basket
2022–23	(Serbia) Marina Maljković	(Turkey) Fenerbahçe
2023–24	(France) Valérie Garnier	(Turkey) Fenerbahçe
2024–25	(Slovakia) Natália Hejková	(Czech Republic) USK Praha
2025–26	(Spain) Miguel Méndez	(Turkey) Fenerbahçe

== By titles ==
Titles	Head coach	Winning team(s)	Years
15	(Latvia) Raimonds Karnitis	(Soviet Union) Daugava Rīga	1964-1975, 1977, 1981, 1982
6	(Italy) Aldo Corno	(Italy) AS Vicenza (4); (Italy) SFT Como (2)	1985-1988, 1994, 1995
6	(Slovakia) Natália Hejková	(Slovakia) Ružomberok (2); (Russia) Spartak Moscow (2); (Czech Republic) USK Praha (2)	1999, 2000, 2007, 2008, 2015, 2025
4	(Spain) Miguel Méndez	(Russia) UMMC Ekaterinburg (3), (Turkey) Fenerbahçe	2018, 2019, 2021, 2026
3	(Latvia) Oļģerts Altbergs	(Soviet Union) Daugava Rīga	1960, 1961, 1962
3	(Serbia) Mihajlo Vuković	(Socialist Federal Republic of Yugoslavia) Jedinstvo Tuzla (1); (Spain) Ros Casares Valencia (2)	1989, 1992, 1993
2	(Bulgaria) Dimitar Mitev	(Bulgaria) Slavia Sofia	1959, 1963
2	(Russia) Vadim Kapranov	(France) Bourges	1997, 1998
2	(France) Laurent Buffard	(France) Valenciennes Olympic	2002, 2004
2	(Spain) Lucas Mondelo	(Spain) CB Avenida (1); (Russia) Dynamo Kursk (1)	2011, 2017
2	(Germany) Olaf Lange	(Russia) UMMC Ekaterinburg	2013, 2016
1	(Czech Republic) Lubomír Dobrý	(Czechoslovakia) Sparta Prague	1976
1	(Italy) Dante Gurioli	(Italy) Geas Sesto San Giovanni	1978
1	(Serbia) Strahinja Alagić	(Socialist Federal Republic of Yugoslavia) Crvena zvezda	1979
1	(Italy) Bruno Arrigone	(Italy) FIAT Torino	1980
1	(Italy) Piero Pasini	(Italy) Zolú Vicenza	1983
1	(Bulgaria) Stanislav Boyadzhiev	(Bulgaria) Levski Sofia	1984
1	(Italy) Santino Coppa	(Italy) Enimont Priolo	1990
1	(Italy) Paolo Rossi	(Italy) Conad Cesena	1991
1	(Germany) Bernd Motte	(Germany) BTV Wuppertal	1996
1	(France) Olivier Hirsch	(France) Bourges	2001
1	(Serbia) Zoran Višić	(Russia) UMMC Ekaterinburg	2003
1	(Russia) Igor Grudin	(Russia) VBM-SGAU Samara	2005
1	(Czech Republic) Jan Bobrovský	(Czech Republic) Gambrinus Sika Brno	2006
1	(Hungary) László Rátgéber	(Russia) Spartak Moscow Region	2009
1	(United States) Pokey Chatman	(Russia) Spartak Moscow Region	2010
1	(Spain) Roberto Íñiguez	(Spain) Ros Casares Valencia	2012
1	(Turkey) Ekrem Memnun	(Turkey) Galatasaray Odeabank	2014
1	(Hungary) Dávid Gáspár	(Hungary) Sopron Basket	2022
1	(Serbia) Marina Maljković	(Turkey) Fenerbahçe	2023
1	(France) Valérie Garnier	(Turkey) Fenerbahçe	2024

== See also ==
- List of EuroLeague Women winning players
