= 1976–77 FIBA Women's European Champions Cup =

International basketball competition

The 1976–77 FIBA Women's European Champions Cup was the 19th edition of FIBA Europe's competition for women's basketball national champion clubs, running from October 1976 to March 1977. For the first time the final was played as a single match in a neutral venue, with Daugava Riga defeating Clermont UC in Barcelona to win its 16th title.

== Preliminary round ==
Team #1	Res.	Team #2	1st	2nd
Bundeslandervers (Austria)	156–66	(Turkey) Yükselis Koleji	86–34	70–32
Högsbo (Sweden)	119–177	(Poland) Wisła Kraków	58–91	61–86
Black Star (Luxembourg)	156–66	(Germany) Düsseldorfer	68–92	56–92
Picadero (Spain)	142–95	(Switzerland) Muraltese	79–52	63–43

== First round ==
Team #1	Res.	Team #2	1st	2nd
Bundeslandervers (Austria)	109–171	(Italy) Geas	64–72	45–99
Akademik Sofia (Bulgaria)	206–59	(Egypt) Sporting Alexandria	99–20	107–39
Wisła Kraków (Poland)	148–149	(Romania) IEFS Bucharest	78–75	70–74
Amicale Merelbeke (Belgium)	93–137	(France) Clermont	45–77	48–61
Crvena Zvezda (Socialist Federal Republic of Yugoslavia)	185–126	(Israel) Maccabi Tel Aviv	95–55	90–71
Düsseldorfer (Germany)	103–165	(Spain) Picadero	39–69	64–96

== Group stage ==
=== Group A ===
#	Team	Pld	W	L	PF	PA
1	(Czech Republic) Sparta Prague	6	5	1	471	412
2	(Italy) Geas	6	3	3	406	388
3	(Bulgaria) Akademik Sofia	6	3	3	446	458
4	(Romania) IEFS Bucharest	6	1	5	433	498

=== Group B ===
#	Team	Pld	W	L	PF	PA
1	(Soviet Union) Daugava Riga	6	6	0	480	323
2	(France) Clermont	6	3	3	446	367
3	(Socialist Federal Republic of Yugoslavia) Crvena Zvezda	6	3	3	408	438
4	(Spain) Picadero	6	0	6	291	497

== Semifinals ==
Team #1	Res.	Team #2	1st	2nd
Geas (Italy)	115–164	(Soviet Union) Daugava Riga	60–89	55–75
Clermont (France)	144–121	(Czech Republic) Sparta Prague	71–56	73–65

== Final ==
31 March 1977

Daugava Riga (Soviet Union)	76–53	(France) Clermont
Pts: Semjonova 38		Pts: Quiblier 17

Barcelona, Spain
