= 1968–69 FIBA Women's European Champions Cup =

International basketball competition

The 1968-69 FIBA Women's European Champions Cup was the tenth edition of the competition. Daugava Riga defeated Chemie Halle to win its sixth trophy in a row. This was the only appearance of an East German team in the competition's final. 1968 runner-up Sparta Prague withdrew from the 6-team Group stage, refusing to play against Akademik Sofia.

== Qualifying round ==
| Team #1 | Agg. | Team #2 | 1st leg | 2nd leg |
|---|---|---|---|---|
| Daugava Riga (Soviet Union) | Bye | — | — | — |
| Kollejliler Ankara (Turkey) | 65 - 146 | (Bulgaria) Akademik Sofia | 31-70 | 34-76 |
| Göttingen 05 (Germany) | 100 - 133 | (Hungary) Budapest VTSK | 46-62 | 54-71 |
| Academica de Coimbra (Portugal) | 56 - 110 | (Spain) CREFF Madrid | 31-39 | 25-71 |
| Politehnica Bucharest (Romania) | 129 - 127 | (Socialist Federal Republic of Yugoslavia) Radnički Beograd | 71-68 | 58-59 |
| Sparta Prague (Czechoslovakia) | Bye | — | — | — |
| Riri Mendrisio (Switzerland) | 93 - 159 | (France) Clermont | 51-72 | 42-87 |
| Ruter/Mörby (Sweden) | 64 - 157 | (East Germany) Chemie Hall | 47-84 | 17-73 |
| Maccabi Tel Aviv (Israel) | 94 - 105 | (Italy) Vicenza | 55-50 | 39-55 |
| AMJV Amsterdam (Netherlands) | 99 - 141 | (Poland) Wisła Kraków | 47-69 | 52-72 |
| Firestone Wien (Austria) | 127 - 95 | (Belgium) Standard Liège | 72-51 | 55-44 |

== Round of 12 ==
| Team #1 | Agg. | Team #2 | 1st leg | 2nd leg |
|---|---|---|---|---|
| Daugava Riga (Soviet Union) | Bye | — | — | — |
| Akademik Sofia (Bulgaria) | 109 - 100 | (Hungary) Budapest VTSK | 58-43 | 51-57 |
| CREFF Madrid (Spain) | 109 - 100 | (Romania) Politehnica Bucharest | 45-70 | 43-72 |
| Clermont (France) | 118 - 131 | (Czechoslovakia) Sparta Prague | 54-53 | 64-78 |
| WBC Chemie Halle (East Germany) | 93 - 92 | (Italy) Vicenza | 47-38 | 46-54 |
| Firestone Wien (Austria) | 109 - 148 | (Poland) Wisła Kraków | 54-66 | 55-82 |

== Group stage ==
=== Group A ===
| | Team | Pld | W | L | PF | PA |
|---|---|---|---|---|---|---|
| 1. | (Bulgaria) Akademik Sofia | 4 | 3 | 1 | 144 | 140 |
| 2. | (Romania) Politehnica Bucharest | 4 | 1 | 3 | 259 | 279 |
| 3. | (Czechoslovakia) Sparta Prague | 4 | 2 | 2 | 135 | 119 |

| Politehnica Bucharest | 74-63 66-81 | Akademik Sofia |
| Sparta Prague | 72-58 63-61 | Politehnica Bucharest |
| Akademik Sofia | walkover | Sparta Prague |

=== Group B ===
| | Team | Pld | W | L | PF | PA |
|---|---|---|---|---|---|---|
| 1. | (Soviet Union) Daugava Riga | 4 | 4 | 0 | 287 | 220 |
| 2. | (East Germany) Chemie Halle | 4 | 1 | 3 | 222 | 258 |
| 3. | (Poland) Wisła Kraków | 4 | 1 | 3 | 215 | 244 |

| Chemie Halle | 57-74 55-79 | Daugava Riga |
| Wisła Kraków | 62-53 43-57 | Chemie Halle |
| Wisła Kraków | 54-72 56-62 | Sparta Prague |

== Semifinals ==
| Team #1 | Agg. | Team #2 | 1st leg | 2nd leg |
|---|---|---|---|---|
| Politehnica Bucharest (Romania) | 116 - 157 | (Soviet Union) Daugava Riga | 49-72 | 67-85 |
| Chemie Halle (East Germany) | 123 - 99 | (Bulgaria) Akademik Sofia | 74-46 | 49-53 |

== Final ==
| Team #1 | Agg. | Team #2 | 1st leg | 2nd leg |
|---|---|---|---|---|
| Daugava Riga (Soviet Union) | 144 - 105 | (East Germany) Chemie Halle | 62-48 | 82-57 |
