= Dzidra Uztupe-Karamiševa =

Latvian basketball player and trainer

Personal information
- Born: 2 May 1930 Smiltene, Latvia
- Died: 27 December 2014 (aged 84) Riga, Latvia
- Listed height: 1.70 m (5 ft 7 in)
- Listed weight: 60 kg (132 lb)

Career information
- High school: Riga No. 5 (Riga, Latvia)
- College: LVFKI
- Playing career: 1947–1963
- Position: Point guard
- Coaching career: 1965–1979

Career history

Playing
- 1947–1958: Daugava Riga
- 1958–1963: TTT Riga

Coaching
- 1965–1979: TTT Riga (assistant)

Career highlights
- As player: 3× EuroLeague Women's champion (1960, 1961, 1962); 4× Soviet League champion (1960–1963); 5× Latvian League champion (1950, 1951, 1956, 1959, 1965); As assistant coach: 10× EuroLeague Women's champion (1965–1975); 11× Soviet League champion (1966, 1968–1973, 1975–1977, 1979); 3× Latvian League champion (1965, 1967, 1968)
Medals
Representing Soviet Union
World Championship
Silver medal – second place	1957 Brazil	Team competition
EuroBasket
Gold medal – first place	1952 Soviet Union	Team competition
Gold medal – first place	1954 Yugoslavia	Team competition
Gold medal – first place	1956 Czechoslovakia	Team competition
Gold medal – first place	1962 France	Team competition

Dzidra Uztupe-Karamiševa (née Uztupe; 2 May 1930 – 27 December 2014) was a Latvian basketball player and coach. During her career Uztupe-Karamiševa won three FIBA European Champions Cups and four Soviet League titles. She represented the Soviet Union national team and won four EuroBasket tournaments.

== Career ==
Uztupe was born on 2 May 1930 in Smiltene, Latvia, and spent her youth in the Pārdaugava area of Riga. She attended the Riga Secondary School No. 5 where she took up basketball, volleyball and track and field. She held the Latvian record in high jump among girls and was the champion in both high jump and volleyball.

Uztupe joined Daugava Riga in 1947 and played with the team until 1958. In 1958, she joined TTT Riga and served as the team's captain. She won the FIBA European Champions Cup three times and became a Soviet League champion in four consecutive seasons.
