= 1971–72 FIBA Women's European Champions Cup =

International basketball competition

The 1971–72 FIBA Women's European Champions Cup was the twelfth edition of FIBA Europe's competition for women's basketball national champion clubs, running from October 1971 to April 1972. The group stage was expanded from six to eight teams.

Daugava Riga defeated Sparta Prague in the final to win their ninth title in a row.

== Qualification round ==
Team #1	Agg.	Team #2	1st	2nd
Iraklis (Greece)	62–105	(Spain) CREFF Madrid	34–59	28–46
Kolejliler (Turkey)	117–174	(Hungary) Egyetértés	51–79	66–95
All Blacks (Scotland)	85–126	(Belgium) Le Logis	44–62	41–64
Göttingen (Germany)	103–136	(Austria) Firestone Wien	49–50	54–86

== Round of 14 ==
Team #1	Agg.	Team #2	1st	2nd
Blue Stars (Netherlands)	129–168	(Czech Republic) Sparta Prague	80–87	49–81
Maritsa Plovdiv (Bulgaria)	walkover	(Romania) Politehnica Bucharest		
CREFF Madrid (Spain)	102–138	(Hungary) Egyetértés	39–54	63–84
Le Logis (Belgium)	69–164	(France) Clermont	33–68	36–96
CIF Lisboa (Portugal)	65–178	(Italy) Geas	33–68	32–110
Maccabi Tel Aviv (Israel)	134–155	(Socialist Federal Republic of Yugoslavia) Željezničar Sarajevo	65–77	69–78
Firestone Wien (Austria)	119–136	(Poland) Wisła Kraków	69–65	50–71

== Group stage ==
=== Group A ===
#	Team	Pld	W	L	PF	PA
1	(Soviet Union) Daugava Riga	6	6	0	509	318
2	(Czech Republic) Sparta Prague	6	3	3	410	416
3	(Bulgaria) Maritsa Plovdiv	6	3	3	388	395
4	(Hungary) Egyetértés	6	0	6	362	540

=== Group B ===
#	Team	Pld	W	L	PF	PA
1	(France) Clermont	6	5	1	350	305
2	(Italy) Geas	6	3	3	346	331
3	(Poland) Wisła Kraków	6	3	3	343	323
4	(Socialist Federal Republic of Yugoslavia) Željezničar Sarajevo	6	1	5	373	453

== Semifinals ==
Team #1	Agg.	Team #2	1st	2nd
Daugava Riga (Soviet Union)	163–90	(Italy) Geas	91–48	72–42
Sparta Prague (Czech Republic)	110–107	(France) Clermont	67–54	43–53

== Finals ==
Team #1	Agg.	Team #2	1st	2nd
Daugava Riga (Soviet Union)	166–118	(Czech Republic) Sparta Prague	80–59	86–59
