= 1970–71 FIBA Women's European Champions Cup =

International basketball competition

The 1970–71 FIBA Women's European Champions Cup was the twelfth edition of FIBA Europe's competition for women's basketball national champion clubs, running from November 1970 to April 1971.

France's Clermont UC became the first team from the Western Bloc to reach the competition's final, defeating 1970 runner-up Wisła Kraków in the semifinals, but it wasn't able to end the Soviet hegemony, with Daugava Riga winning its eighth title in a row. Turkey withdrew from the competition for sanitary reasons.

== Qualifying round ==
Team #1	Agg.	Team #2	1st	2nd
Clermont (France)	105–87	(Hungary) MTK Budapest	51–55	54–32
All Blacks (Scotland)	74–224	(Netherlands) AMVJ Amsterdam	37–106	37–118
Göttingen (Germany)	122–145	(Austria) Firestone Wien	65–66	57–79
CREFF Madrid (Spain)	walkover	(Turkey) Kolejliler		
Geas (Italy)	170–81	(Belgium) Hellas Gent	93–40	77–41
Academica Coimbra (Portugal)	?	(Socialist Federal Republic of Yugoslavia) Vojvodina	?	?

== Round of 10 ==
Team #1	Agg.	Team #2	1st	2nd
Clermont (France)	113–103	(Netherlands) AMVJ Amsterdam	43–43	70–60
Firestone Wien (Austria)	98–157	(Czech Republic) Slavia Prague	49–74	49–83
CREFF Madrid (Spain)	81–144	(Poland) Wisła Kraków	44–71	37–73
Politehnica Bucharest (Romania)	121–133	(Bulgaria) Akademik Sofia	59–61	62–72
Geas (Italy)	124–120	(Socialist Federal Republic of Yugoslavia) Vojvodina	67–52	57–68

== Group stage ==
=== Group A ===
#	Team	Pld	W	D	L	PF	PA
1	(Soviet Union) Daugava Riga	4	4	0	0	295	199
2	(France) Clermont	4	1	1	2	225	251
3	(Czech Republic) Slavia Prague	4	1	1	2	209	279

=== Group B ===
#	Team	Pld	W	D	L	PF	PA
1	(Poland) Wisła Kraków	4	4	0	0	240	207
2	(Bulgaria) Akademik Sofia	4	2	0	2	242	230
3	(Italy) Geas	4	0	0	4	185	230

== Semifinals ==
Team #1	Agg.	Team #2	1st	2nd
Clermont (France)	134–100	(Poland) Wisła Kraków	57–55	77–45
Akademik Sofia (Bulgaria)	102–139	(Soviet Union) Daugava Riga	60–68	42–71

== Finals ==
Team #1	Agg.	Team #2	1st	2nd
Clermont (France)	115–134	(Soviet Union) Daugava Riga	59–72	56–62
