= 1964–65 FIBA Women's European Champions Cup =

International basketball competition

The 1964–65 FIBA Women's European Champions Cup was the seventh edition of FIBA's competition for European women's basketball national champions. It ran from December 10, 1964, to June 18, 1965, and it was contested by 14 teams. Defending champion Daugava Riga defeated 2-times champions Slavia Sofia, which made its final appearance in the competition, to win its fifth title.

== Results ==
Round 1 December 10–17, 1964
(France) Gerbe Montceau	w/o
(Portugal) Académica Coimbra
(Hungary) MTK Budapest	?
(Israel) Maccabi Tel Aviv	?
(West Germany) ?	?
(Socialist Federal Republic of Yugoslavia) Radnički Beograd	?
(East Germany) Chemie Halle	51	63	114
(Czechoslovakia) Slovan Orbis Prague	65	74	129
(Netherlands) Blue Stars BC	65	59	124
(Spain) CREFF Madrid	43	39	82
(Romania) Ştiinţa Bucharest
(Bulgaria) Slavia Sofia	w/o

Quarterfinals; January 7–28, 1965
(France) Gerbe Montceau	51	45	96
(Poland) Wisla Krakow	50	63	113
(Israel) Maccabi Tel Aviv	39	26	65
(Soviet Union) Daugava Riga	93	96	189
(Socialist Federal Republic of Yugoslavia) Radnički Beograd	59	66	125
(Czechoslovakia) Slovan Orbis Prague	63	73	136
(Netherlands) Blue Stars BC	64	54	118
(Bulgaria) Slavia Sofia	63	71	134

Semifinals; February 10–19, 1965
(Poland) Wisla Krakow	43	52	95
(Soviet Union) Daugava Riga	64	54	118
(Czechoslovakia) Slovan Orbis Prague	60	44	104
(Bulgaria) Slavia Sofia	57	57	114

Final; June 11–18, 1965
(Soviet Union) Daugava Riga	49	52	101
(Bulgaria) Slavia Sofia	31	62	93
