= 1972–73 FIBA Women's European Champions Cup =

International basketball competition

The 1972–73 FIBA Women's European Champions Cup was the thirteenth edition of FIBA Europe's competition for women's basketball national champion clubs, running from November 1972 to March 1973. Daugava Riga defeated Clermont UC in the final to win its tenth title in a row.

== Preliminary round ==
Team #1	Agg.	Team #2	1st	2nd
Le Logis (Belgium)	117–160	(Austria) Firestone Wien	62–91	55–69
Academica Coimbra (Portugal)	82–119	(Spain) Mataró	48–48	34–71
Tirnforf Ware (England)	142–128	(Luxembourg) Black Star	66–53	76–75
KFUM Stockholm (Sweden)	93–122	(Germany) Göttingen	44–60	49–62
Rapid Bucharest (Romania)	121–89	(Israel) Maccabi Tel Aviv	70–48	51–41

== First round ==
Team #1	Agg.	Team #2	1st	2nd
Iraklis (Greece)	81–240	(Italy) Geas	46–116	35–124
Firestone Wien (Austria)	134–164	(Poland) Łódź	70–83	64–81
Mataró (Spain)	113–115	(Hungary) TFSE Budapest	54–58	59–57
Tirnforf Ware (England)	101–295	(France) Clermont	41–125	66–170
Göttingen (Germany)	89–178	(Czech Republic) Sparta Prague	47–92	42–86
Uxeledge College (Turkey)	70–165	(Bulgaria) Minyor Pernik	38–81	32–84
Rapid Bucharest (Romania)	134–141	(Socialist Federal Republic of Yugoslavia) Voždovac	68–58	66–83

== Group stage ==
=== Group A ===
#	Team	Pld	W	L	PF	PA
1	(Soviet Union) Daugava Riga	6	6	0	519	320
2	(Italy) Geas	6	2	4	397	425
3	(Poland) Łódź	6	2	4	372	451
4	(Hungary) TFSE Budapest	6	2	4	360	450

=== Group B ===
#	Team	Pld	W	L	PF	PA
1	(France) Clermont	6	4	2	431	370
2	(Czech Republic) Sparta Prague	6	4	2	405	321
3	(Bulgaria) Minyor Pernik	6	3	3	371	387
4	(Socialist Federal Republic of Yugoslavia) Voždovac	6	1	5	375	504

== Semifinals ==
Team #1	Agg.	Team #2	1st	2nd
Geas (Italy)	116–117	(France) Clermont	56–63	60–54
Sparta Prague (Czech Republic)	101–150	(Soviet Union) Daugava Riga	40–62	61–88

== Final ==
Team #1	Agg.	Team #2	1st	2nd
Clermont (France)	104–147	(Soviet Union) Daugava Riga	44–64	60–83
