= 1973–74 FIBA Women's European Champions Cup =

International basketball competition

The 1973–74 FIBA Women's European Champions Cup was the fourteenth edition of FIBA Europe's competition for women's basketball national champion clubs, running from November 1973 to April 1974. Daugava Riga defeated Clermont UC in a rematch of the past edition's final to win its eleventh title in a row.

== Preliminary round ==
Team #1	Agg.	Team #2	1st	2nd
UGE Wien (Austria)	148–118	(Portugal) Academica Coimbra	86–53	62–65
Nyon (Switzerland)	99–147	(Belgium) Aalst	50–57	49–90

== First round ==
Team #1	Agg.	Team #2	1st	2nd
UGE Wien (Austria)	133–178	(Romania) Politehnica Bucharest	73–94	60–84
Standa Milan (Italy)	139–103	(Belgium) Aalst	76–47	63–56
MTK Budapest (Hungary)	?	(Luxembourg) Black Star	106–47	?
Maccabi Tel Aviv (Israel)	92–175	(France) Clermont	49–67	43–108
Mataró (Spain)	102–178	(Poland) Łódź	47–79	55–96
Yükseliş Koleji (Turkey)	104–195	(Bulgaria) Maritsa Plovdiv	58–96	46–99
Centymca (Scotland)	69–202	(Czech Republic) Slavia Prague	31–107	38–95

== Group stage ==
=== Group A ===
#	Team	Pld	W	L	PF	PA
1	(Soviet Union) Daugava Riga	6	6	0	482	279
2	(Romania) Politehnica Bucharest	6	4	2	385	421
3	(Italy) Standa Milan	6	1	5	353	424
4	(Hungary) MTK Budapest	6	1	5	346	419

=== Group B ===
#	Team	Pld	W	L	PF	PA
1	(France) Clermont	6	5	1	467	341
2	(Poland) Łódź	6	3	3	393	345
3	(Bulgaria) Maritsa Plovdiv	6	3	3	353	378
4	(Czech Republic) Slavia Prague	6	1	5	371	463

== Semifinals ==
Team #1	Agg.	Team #2	1st	2nd
Łódź (Poland)	104–172	(Soviet Union) Daugava Riga	52–91	52–81
Politehnica Bucharest (Romania)	153–165	(France) Clermont	71–75	82–90

== Final ==
Team #1	Agg.	Team #2	1st	2nd
Daugava Riga (Soviet Union)	164–120	(France) Clermont	96–67	69–53
