= 1975–76 FIBA Women's European Champions Cup =

International basketball competition

The 1975–76 FIBA Women's European Champions Cup was the 18th edition of FIBA Europe's competition for women's basketball national champion clubs, running from October 1975 to March 1976. The Soviet Union didn't take part in the competition, ending Daugava Riga's record 12-year winning streak, and Sparta Prague defeated Clermont UC in the last final played as a two-legged tie to become the first Czechoslovak team to win the trophy.

== Preliminary round ==
| Team #1 | Agg. | Team #2 | 1st | 2nd |
|---|---|---|---|---|
| Heliopolis (Egypt) | 57–153 | (Austria) Bundeslandevers | 28–43 | 29–110 |

== First round ==
| Team #1 | Agg. | Team #2 | 1st | 2nd |
|---|---|---|---|---|
| Nokia (Finland) | 100–207 | (France) Wisła Kraków | 57–117 | 43–90 |
| Bundeslandevers (Austria) | 121–153 | (Socialist Federal Republic of Yugoslavia) Voždovac | 71–73 | 50–80 |
| Hapoel Tel Aviv (Israel) | 111–154 | (Italy) Geas | 42–59 | 69–95 |
| Agon Düsseldorf (Germany) | 73–124 | (Spain) Picadero | 38–52 | 35–72 |
| Yükseliş Koleji (Turkey) | 116–124 | (Belgium) Le Logis | 60–54 | 56–70 |

== Group stage ==
=== Group A ===
| # | Team | Pld | W | D | L | PF | PA |
|---|---|---|---|---|---|---|---|
| 1 | (Czech Republic) Sparta Prague | 6 | 3 | 1 | 2 | 450 | 387 |
| 2 | (Bulgaria) Akademik Sofia | 6 | 3 | 2 | 1 | 446 | 409 |
| 3 | (Poland) Wisła Kraków | 6 | 3 | 1 | 2 | 468 | 442 |
| 4 | (Socialist Federal Republic of Yugoslavia) Voždovac | 6 | 1 | 0 | 5 | 390 | 516 |

=== Group B ===
| # | Team | Pld | W | D | L | PF | PA |
|---|---|---|---|---|---|---|---|
| 1 | (France) Clermont | 6 | 5 | 0 | 1 | 494 | 327 |
| 2 | (Italy) Geas | 6 | 4 | 0 | 2 | 399 | 333 |
| 3 | (Spain) Picadero | 6 | 3 | 0 | 3 | 368 | 381 |
| 4 | (Belgium) Le Logis | 6 | 0 | 0 | 6 | 332 | 552 |

== Semifinals ==
| Team #1 | Agg. | Team #2 | 1st | 2nd |
|---|---|---|---|---|
| Akademik Sofia (Bulgaria) | 123–128 | (France) Clermont | 65–60 | 58–68 |
| Geas (Italy) | 105–132 | (Czech Republic) Sparta Prague | 56–73 | 49–59 |

== Final ==
| Team #1 | Agg. | Team #2 | 1st | 2nd |
|---|---|---|---|---|
| Clermont (France) | 115–132 | (Czech Republic) Sparta Prague | 58–55 | 57–77 |
