= 1963–64 FIBA Women's European Champions Cup =

International basketball competition

The 1963–64 Women's Basketball European Cup was the 6th edition of the competition. Daugava Riga defeated Spartak Sokolovo Prague in the final to win its fourth European Cup, having previously overcome defending champion Slavia Sofia in the semifinals. With a 103–101 aggregate it was the tightest final so far. This tournament marked the beginning of Daugava's hegemony in the European Cup, which was continuing the following eleven editions.

14 teams took part in the competition, with Belgium and Netherlands making their first appearance. Portugal, represented by Benfica de Lubango from Portuguese Angola, retired from the competition.

== Qualification round ==
Team #1	Agg.	Team #2	1st leg	2nd leg
CREFF Madrid (Spain)	Walkover	(Portugal) Benfica de Lubango	—	—

== Round of 16 ==
Team #1	Agg.	Team #2	1st leg	2nd leg
Daugava Riga (Soviet Union)	Bye	—	—	—
Zeneca Geneve (Switzerland)	76 – 164	(East Germany) Berlin 1893	35–72	41–92
Slavia Sofia (Bulgaria)	Bye	—	—	—
MTK Budapest (Hungary)	181 – 63	(Turkey) SK Ankara	87–29	94–34
ASPTTR Rabat (Morocco)	45 – 136	(Poland) Olimpia Poznań	19–73	26–63
Standard Liège (Belgium)	94 – 132	(Socialist Federal Republic of Yugoslavia) Crvena zvezda	54–58	40–74
CREFF Madrid (Spain)	77 – 104	(West Germany) THW 1846 Heidelberg	42–57	35–47
Blue Stars Amsterdam (Netherlands)	102 – 143	(Czechoslovakia) Spartak Sokolovo Prague	58–66	44–77

== Quarter-finals ==
Team #1	Agg.	Team #2	1st leg	2nd leg
Berlin 1893 (East Germany)	86 – 138	(Soviet Union) Daugava Riga	48–72	38–66
MTK Budapest (Hungary)	122 – 157	(Bulgaria) Slavia Sofia	68–93	54–64
Olimpia Poznań (Poland)	120 – 134	(Socialist Federal Republic of Yugoslavia) Crvena zvezda	64–66	56–68
THW 1846 Heidelberg (West Germany)	94 – 181	(Czechoslovakia) Spartak Sokolovo Prague	61–83	33–98

== Semi-finals ==
Team #1	Agg.	Team #2	1st leg	2nd leg
Slavia Sofia (Bulgaria)	98 – 107	(Soviet Union) Daugava Riga	51–46	47–61
Spartak Sokolovo Prague (Czechoslovakia)	152 – 113	(Socialist Federal Republic of Yugoslavia) Crvena zvezda	75–59	77–54

== Final ==
Team #1	Agg.	Team #2	1st leg	2nd leg
Spartak Sokolovo Prague (Czechoslovakia)	101 – 103	(Soviet Union) Daugava Riga	58–63	43–40
