= 1960 in basketball =

The following are the basketball events of the year 1960 throughout the world.

The following are the basketball events of the year 1960 throughout the world. Tournaments include international (FIBA), professional (club) and amateur and collegiate levels.

== Olympics ==
- Basketball at the 1960 Summer Olympics

At the 1960 Summer Olympics, United States men's basketball team would go on to win the gold medal. Team USA was led by Hall of Famers Oscar Robertson and Jerry West.

== NBA ==
- 1960 NBA draft
- 1960 NBA Finals
- 1960 NBA Playoffs
- 1960 NBA All-Star Game
- 1959–60 NBA season
- 1960–61 NBA season

== NBA awards ==
- Most Valuable Player: Wilt Chamberlain, Philadelphia Warriors
- Rookie of the Year: Wilt Chamberlain, Philadelphia Warriors
- NBA All-Star Game MVP award:Wilt Chamberlain, Philadelphia Warriors

- All-NBA First Team:
  - Wilt Chamberlain, Philadelphia Warriors
  - Bob Pettit, St. Louis Hawks
  - Gene Shue, Detroit Pistons
  - Bob Cousy, Boston Celtics
  - Elgin Baylor, Minneapolis Lakers
- All-NBA Second Team:
  - Richie Guerin, New York Knicks
  - Bill Russell, Boston Celtics
  - Dolph Schayes, Syracuse Nationals
  - Bill Sharman, Boston Celtics
  - Jack Twyman, Cincinnati Royals

== FIBA ==
- FIBA South American Championship for Women 1960
- 1960–61 FIBA European Champions Cup
- 1959–60 FIBA Women's European Champions Cup
- 1960–61 FIBA Women's European Champions Cup

== NAIA ==
- 1960 NAIA Basketball Tournament

== NCAA ==
- 1960 NCAA Men's Division I Basketball Tournament
- 1960 National Invitation Tournament
- 1960 NCAA Men's Division II Basketball Tournament

== International competition ==
- 1960 ABC Championship

== Naismith Memorial Basketball Hall of Fame ==
- Class of 1960:
  - Ernest Blood
  - Frank Keaney
  - Vic Hanson
  - Ward Lambert
  - Ed Macauley
  - Branch McCracken
  - Charles Murphy
  - John Wooden

== Births ==
- January 12 - Dominique Wilkins, American basketball player
- March 8 - Buck Williams, American basketball player
- March 13 - Cliff Robinson, American basketball player
- June 12 – Joe Kopicki, American basketball player
- June 21 – Kevin Harlan, sports announcer
- August 6 - Dale Ellis, American basketball player
- August 18 - Fat Lever, American basketball player
- September 29 - John Paxson, American basketball player

== Deaths ==
- January 1 — Murray Greason, American college coach (Wake Forest) (born 1901)
