= 1962–63 FIBA Women's European Champions Cup =

International basketball competition

The 1962–63 Women's basketball European Cup was the fifth edition of the competition. It was won by Slavia Sofia, who defeated Slovan Orbis Prague in the final. Previously Slavia had beaten in the semifinals Daugava Riga, who had won the three previous competitions. This was Slavia's second and last European Cup title, and Daugava's only failure in its 1960-75 European Cup run.

For the first time the defending champion's national championship was not allowed a second spot, and a second team (eventual champion Slavia Sofia) was given a bye to the quarter-finals. Switzerland took part in the championship for the first time, while Israel, Morocco and Turkey retired and Yugoslavia didn't enter the competition, leaving it in 12 teams. Africa was still represented by Benfica de Lubango, from Portuguese Angola.

== Qualification round ==
Team #1	Agg.	Team #2	1st leg	2nd leg
CREFF Madrid (Spain)	Walkover	(Morocco) Sportif Casablancais	—	—

== Round of 16 ==
Team #1	Agg.	Team #2	1st leg	2nd leg
Slavia Sofia (Bulgaria)	Bye	—	—	—
Rotation Berlin (East Germany)	86 – 97	(Poland) AZS Warsaw	42–37	44–60
Daugava Riga (Soviet Union)	Bye	—	—	—
Rapid București (Romania)	Walkover	(Israel) Hapoel Tel Aviv	—	—
Bern BC (Switzerland)	67 – 95	(West Germany) TV Gross-Gerau	31–53	36–42
Nibelungen Wien (Austria)	100 – 141	(Hungary) MTK Budapest	44–62	56–79
Benfica de Lubango (Portugal)	91 – 81	(Spain) CREFF Madrid	55–38	36–43
Slovan Orbis Prague (Czechoslovakia)	Walkover	(Turkey) USK istanbul	—	—

== Quarter-finals ==
Team #1	Agg.	Team #2	1st leg	2nd leg
AZS Warsaw (Poland)	99 – 120	(Bulgaria) Slavia Sofia	57–56	42–64
Daugava Riga (Soviet Union)	113 – 69	(Romania) Rapid București	57–27	56–42
MTK Budapest (Hungary)	137 – 78	(West Germany) TV Gross-Gerau	79–37	58–41
Slovan Orbis Prague (Czechoslovakia)	168 – 62	(Portugal) Benfica de Lubango	87–32	81–30

== Semifinals ==
Team #1	Agg.	Team #2	1st leg	2nd leg
Slavia Sofia (Bulgaria)	82 – 80	(Soviet Union) Daugava Riga	39–46	43–34
Slovan Orbis Prague (Czechoslovakia)	130 – 118	(Hungary) MTK Budapest	69–50	61–68

== Final ==
Team #1	Agg.	Team #2	1st leg	2nd leg
Slovan Orbis Prague (Czechoslovakia)	106 – 112	(Bulgaria) Slavia Sofia	57–52	49–60
