= 1986–87 FIBA Women's European Champions Cup =

International basketball competition

The 1986–87 Women's Basketball European Cup was the 29th edition of the competition. The final took place in Thessaloniki on 12 March 1987 and confronted defending champion AS Vicenza and 1986 Ronchetti Cup champion Dynamo Novosibirsk, with the Italians winning their third European Cup in a row, an overall fourth.

== Qualification round ==
Team #1	Agg.	Team #2	1st leg	2nd leg
Maden Tetkik Ankara (Turkey)	103–167	(Romania) Universitatea Cluj	59–92	44–75
Pully (Luxembourg)	142–276	(Socialist Federal Republic of Yugoslavia) Partizan	82–126	60–150
Crystal Palace (England)	119–190	(Austria) DBB Wien	67–85	52–105
Tampere Pyrintö (Finland)	114–140	(Netherlands) Canadians Amstelveen	55–70	59–70
Sporting Athens (Greece)	112–148	(Israel) Elitzur Tel Aviv	46–76	66–72
RCO Brussels (Belgium)	193–79	Sporting Luxembourg	102–42	91–37
Real Canoe (Spain)	111–149	(France) Stade Français Versailles	59–82	52–67

== Round of 16 ==
Team #1	Agg.	Team #2	1st leg	2nd leg
Primigi Vicenza (Italy)	Bye		—	—
Solna Vikings (Sweden)	149–170	(Soviet Union) Dynamo Novosibirsk	70–68	79–102
ŁKS Łódź (Poland)	183–188	(Romania) Universitatea Cluj	112–79	71–109
BSE Budapest (Hungary)	143–151	(Socialist Federal Republic of Yugoslavia) Partizan	69–68	74–83
DBB Wien (Austria)	118–164	(Bulgaria) Levski-Spartak Sofia	74–84	44–80
Canadians Amstelveen (Netherlands)	135–170	(West Germany) Agon 08 Düsseldorf	72–87	63–83
Elitzur Tel Aviv (Israel)	112–153	(Czechoslovakia) Sparta Prague	52–53	60–100
RCO Brussels (Belgium)	143–164	(France) Stade Français Versailles	77–77	66–87

== Group stage ==
=== Group A ===
	Team	Pld	W	L	PF	PA
1.	(Italy) Primigi Vicenza	6	6	0	526	396
2.	(Soviet Union) Dynamo Novosibirsk	6	4	2	539	462
3.	(Romania) Universitatea Cluj	6	1	5	413	522
4.	(Socialist Federal Republic of Yugoslavia) Partizan	6	1	5	413	522

3–4 December 1986 / 14–15 January 1987
Primigi Vicenza	80-40 75-61	Universitatea Cluj
Dynamo Novosibirsk	82-69 101-87	Partizan
11 December 1986 / 22 January 1987
Dynamo Novosibirsk	78-79 83-91	Primigi Vicenza
Partizan	88-80 84-96	Universitatea Cluj
8 January 1987 / 29 January 1987
Partizan	62-104 72-97	Primigi Vicenza
Universitatea Cluj	64-100 72-95	Dynamo Novosibirsk

=== Group B ===
	Team	Pld	W	L	PF	PA
1.	(Bulgaria) Levski-Spartak Sofia	6	5	1	498	456
2.	(West Germany) Agon 08 Düsseldorf	6	3	3	449	459
3.	(Czech Republic) Sparta Prague	6	2	4	425	442
4.	(France) Stade Français Versailles	6	2	4	424	439

4 December 1986 / 15 January 1987
Levski-Spartak Sofia	67-62 102-87	Sparta Prague
Stade Français Versailles	61-68 91-73	Agon 08 Düsseldorf
11 December 1986 / 22 January 1987
Sparta Prague	62-70 82-75	Agon 08 Düsseldorf
Levski-Spartak Sofia	94-73 72-71	Stade Français Versailles
8 January 1987 / 29 January 1987
Sparta Prague	72-59 60-69	Stade Français Versailles
Agon 08 Düsseldorf	76-71 87-92	Levski-Spartak Sofia

== Semifinals ==
Team #1	Agg.	Team #2	1st leg	2nd leg
Primigi Vicenza (Italy)	154–132	(West Germany) Agon 08 Düsseldorf	89 – 53	65 – 79
Dynamo Novosibirsk (Soviet Union)	180–157	(Bulgaria) Levski-Spartak Sofia	96 – 60	84 – 97

== Final ==
12 March 1987

Primigi Vicenza (Italy)	86–73	(Soviet Union) Dynamo Novosibirsk

Thessaloniki
