= 1969–70 FIBA Women's European Champions Cup =

International basketball competition

The 1969–70 FIBA Women's European Champions Cup was the eleventh edition of FIBA's competition for women's basketball national champion clubs, running from November 1969 to April 1970. Daugava Riga defeated Wisła Kraków, which became the first Polish team to reach the final, to win its seventh title in a row. Albania withdrew from the competition.

== Qualifying round ==
Team #1	Agg.	Team #2	1st	2nd
Kolejliler (Turkey)	90–167	(Hungary) MTK Budapest	51–81	39–86
17 Nëntori (Albania)	walkover	(Socialist Federal Republic of Yugoslavia) Vojvodina		
Lichtenrade (Germany)	?	(Italy) Vicenza	?	?
All Black Edinburgh (Scotland)	64–130	(Spain) CREFF Madrid	49–72	15–58
Hapoel Tel Aviv (Israel)	111–142	(Romania) Rapid Bucharest	60–59	51–83
Clermont (France)	230–48	(Portugal) Academica Coimbra	121–20	109–28
Hellas Gent (Belgium)	112–128	(Austria) Firestone Wien	58–68	54–60
Ruter (Sweden)	80–160	(Czech Republic) Sparta Prague	33–73	47–87

== Round of 10 ==
Team #1	Agg.	Team #2	1st	2nd
MTK Budapest (Hungary)	115–127	(Bulgaria) Akademik Sofia	61–71	54–56
Vojvodina (Socialist Federal Republic of Yugoslavia)	156–116	(Italy) Vicenza	89–61	67–55
CREFF Madrid (Spain)	87–140	(Poland) Wisła Kraków	46–64	41–76
Clermont (France)	142–127	(Romania) Rapid Bucharest	70–48	72–79
Sparta Prague (Czech Republic)	135–97	(Austria) Firestone Wien	73–50	62–47

== Group stage ==
=== Group A ===
#	Team	Pld	W	L	PF	PA
1	(Soviet Union) Daugava Riga	4	4	0	295	218
2	(Poland) Wisła Kraków	4	1	3	214	216
3	(Socialist Federal Republic of Yugoslavia) Vojvodina	4	1	3	961	869

=== Group B ===
#	Team	Pld	W	L	PF	PA
1	(Czechoslovakia) Sparta Prague	4	2	2	225	216
2	(Bulgaria) Akademik Sofia	4	2	2	233	246
3	(France) Clermont	4	2	2	244	319

== Semifinals ==
Team #1	Agg.	Team #2	1st	2nd
Daugava Riga (Soviet Union)	154–100	(Bulgaria) Akademik Sofia	83–38	83–38
Wisła Kraków (Poland)	109–100	(Czech Republic) Sparta Prague	54–52	55–48

== Finals ==
Team #1	Agg.	Team #2	1st	2nd
Daugava Riga (Soviet Union)	120–87	(Poland) Wisła Kraków	61–45	59–42
