= 1961–62 FIBA Women's European Champions Cup =

International basketball competition

The 1961–62 Women's Basketball European Cup was the fourth edition of the competition. Daugava Riga won its third trophy in a row, beating SKA Leningrad in the final. It was the first time the final was played by two teams from the same championship; Daugava and SKA were respectively the champion and runner-up of the 1961 Soviet Championship. This was unparalleled throughout the European Cup era.

Austria, Hungary, Israel and Turkey took part in the competition for the first time. In addition Yugoslavia returned after a one-year absence. For the first time two African teams played the competition, as in addition to Morocco's Sportif Casablancais Portugal was represented by Benfica de Lubango from Portuguese Angola. Due to the increase in the number of contestants, the defending champion entered the competition in the quarter-finals instead of the semi-finals.

As the competition reached 16 teams the two qualifying rounds from the previous season were merged into a Round of 16. However, since Daugava Riga received a bye 15 teams were left to play seven ties, so a triangular was arranged between Benfica de Lubango, Medina La Coruña and Sportif Casablancais in La Coruña.

== Round of 16 ==
Team #1	Agg.	Team #2	1st leg	2nd leg
Daugava Riga (Soviet Union)	Bye	—	—	—
Chemie Leipzig (East Germany)	84 – 127	(Romania) Rapid București	51–66	33–61
Slovan Orbis Prague (Czechoslovakia)	119 – 99	(Hungary) Meteor Budapest	59–43	60–56
TV Augsburg 1847 (West Germany)	112 – 86	(Austria) Nibelungen Wien	61–44	51–42
Medina La Coruña (Spain); Sportif Casablancais (Morocco); Medina La Coruña (Spain)	32 – 30; 54 – 37; 41 – 25	(Portugal) Benfica de Lubango (Portugal) Benfica de Lubango (Morocco) Sportif Casablancais	—	—
Radnički Beograd (Socialist Federal Republic of Yugoslavia)	151 – 37	(Turkey) USK Ankara	79–21	72–16
Slavia Sofia (Bulgaria)	129 – 44	(Israel) Hapoel Tel Aviv	84–34	45–10
SKA Leningrad (Soviet Union)	132 – 128	(Poland) Academicki Warsaw	62–56	70–72

== Quarter-finals ==
Team #1	Agg.	Team #2	1st leg	2nd leg
Daugava Riga (Soviet Union)	112 – 89	(Romania) Rapid București	51–26	61–63
Slovan Orbis Prague (Czechoslovakia)	170 – 76	(West Germany) TV Augsburg 1847	86–33	84–43
Radnički Beograd (Socialist Federal Republic of Yugoslavia)	138 – 54	(Spain) Medina La Coruña	81–35	57–19
Slavia Sofia (Bulgaria)	107 – 121	(Soviet Union) SKA Leningrad	61–63	46–58

== Semi-finals ==
Team #1	Agg.	Team #2	1st leg	2nd leg
Daugava Riga (Soviet Union)	124 – 98	(Czechoslovakia) Slovan Orbis Prague	72–44	52–54
Radnički Beograd (Socialist Federal Republic of Yugoslavia)	101 – 129	(Soviet Union) SKA Leningrad	52–69	49–60

== Final ==
Team #1	Agg.	Team #2	1st leg	2nd leg
Daugava Riga (Soviet Union)	103 – 82	(Soviet Union) SKA Leningrad	55–38	48–44
