= Stefania Passaro =

Italian basketball player, journalist, and financial planner

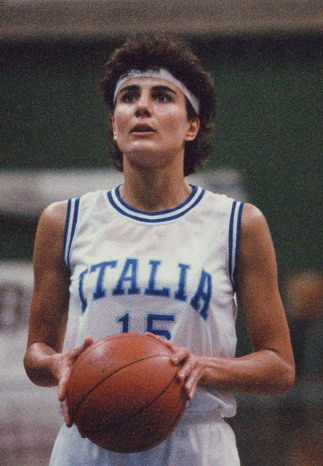
Stefania Passaro on the Italian Team.

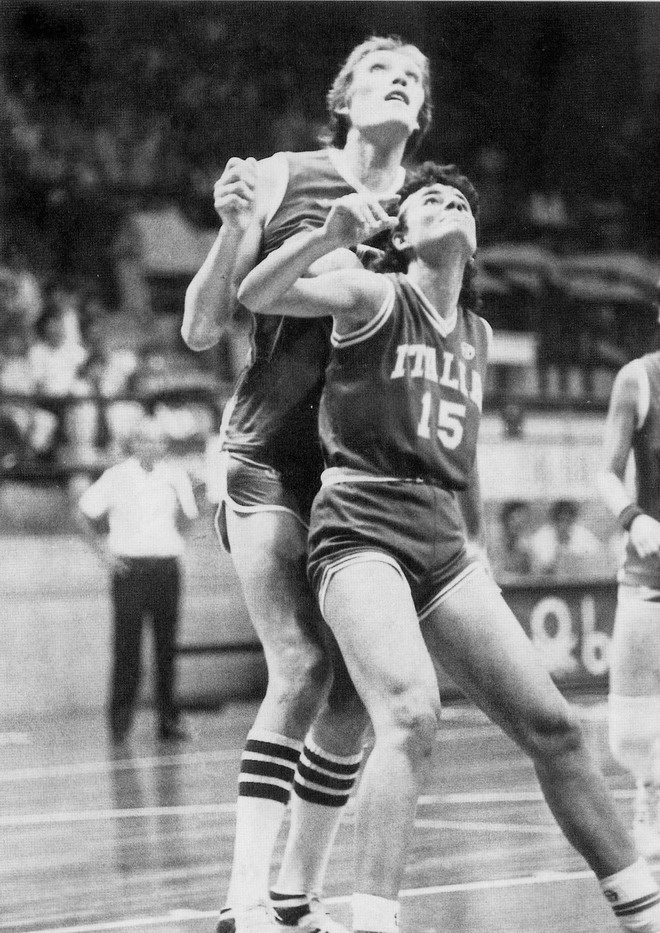
Stefania Passaro boxing out Uljana Semjonova.

Stefania Passaro (born 11 December 1963) is an Italian retired basketball player, a journalist and a certified European Financial Planner. She is 1.92 m (6 ft 3 1/2 in) tall.

Born at Rapallo, she played professionally in Italy for 17 seasons, from 1978 to 1995, earning the European Cup for Women's Champion Clubs for 6 times and National Championships for 10 times.

She played 178 official games on the National Italian Team, beginning in 1980 and including 6 European Championships, one World Championship serving as captain, and the 1992 Summer Olympics in Barcelona.
