= Oļģerts Altbergs =

Latvian basketball player (1921–1998)

Personal information
- Born: May 6, 1921 Riga, Latvia
- Died: December 17, 1998 (aged 77) Riga, Latvia

Career information
- Playing career: 1946–1992
- Position: Head coach
- Coaching career: 1950–1992

Career history
- 1950–1963: Latvian SSR national women's team (Head coach)
- 1955–1962: TTT Riga (Head coach)
- 1963–1968: BK VEF Rīga (Head coach)

Career highlights
- 3× European Cup Champion (TTT Riga); 3× USSR Championship titles (TTT Riga); Meritorious Coach of the Soviet Union (1962); Meritorious Coach of the Latvian SSR (1989); Order of the Three Stars, 5th class (1997); Latvian Basketball Hall of Honor inductee (2012)

Oļģerts Altbergs (May 6, 1921, in Riga – December 17, 1998, in Riga) was a Latvian basketball player, women's basketball coach, and educator of coaches.

In 1958 he obtained the higher education diploma from the Latvian State Institute of Physical Culture (LSIPC; now Latvian Academy of Sport Education, LASE, since 1991). In 1971 he became Candidate of Sciences (a Soviet Ph.D. equivalent) in pedagogics and in 1993 he earned the Doctor of Sciences degree in pedagogics. Since 1946 he was lecturer, docent and professor of the LSIPC/LASE. During 1971–1992 he was chairman of the Coaches Council of the Latvian Basketball Federation/Latvian Basketball Association.

In 1955 he founded the women's basketball team "Daugava" (now TTT Riga), which won three European Cups and three USSR championship titles (1960‒1962). In 1962 Altbergs decided to focus on teaching job and handed over his team to Raimonds Karnītis. During 1963–1968, he managed BK VEF Rīga.

From 1950 to 1963, he was the head coach of the Latvian SSR national women's team.

Alberts authored four books and many educational and methodological publications.

== Awards and recognition ==
- The award given to the best coach of the year in Latvia was named after him.
- 2012: One of the first inductees into the Hall of Honor of Latvian Basketball
- 1997: Order of Three Stars, 5th class
- 1989: Meritorious Coach of the Latvian SSR
- 1962:Meritorious Basketball Coach of the Soviet Union
