= 1967–68 FIBA Women's European Champions Cup =

International basketball competition

The 1967-68 FIBA European Championship Women was the tenth edition of the competition. Daugava Riga defeated Sparta Prague in a rematch of the previous season's final to win its fifth trophy in a row. Italy's AS Vicenza, which would win five trophies in the 1980s, became the first team from Western Europe to reach the competition's semifinals.

This edition marked a reform in the competition's system, with the quarter-finals being replaced by a 6-teams Group stage. This was preceded by a Qualifying Round and a Round of 12. Twenty teams took part in this edition, with defending champions Daugava entering the competition in the group stage and AS Vicenza receiving a bye to the round of 12. Sweden took part in the competition for the first time, while Turkey withdrew.

== Qualifying round ==
Team #1	Agg.	Team #2	1st leg	2nd leg
Daugava Riga (Soviet Union)	Bye	—	—	—
Maccabi Tel Aviv (Israel)	100 - 102	(Austria) Firestone Wien	43-40	57-62
Recoaro Vicenza (Italy)	Bye	—	—	—
Trešnjevka (Socialist Federal Republic of Yugoslavia)	106 - 101	(Bulgaria) Lokomotiv Sofia	48-41	58-59
Universitario Porto (Portugal)	38 - 100	(France) La Gerbe Montceau	17-51	21-49
Ruter Stockholm (Sweden)	76 - 150	(Czechoslovakia) Sparta Prague	48-79	28-71
ATV 1877 Düsseldorf (West Germany)	113 - 108	(France) Standard Liège	70-56	43-62
Berlin 1893 (East Germany)	109 - 121	(Poland) ŁKS Łódź	56-51	53-70
Riri Mendrisio (Switzerland)	97 - 95	(Spain) CREFF Madrid	58-46	39-49
Politehnica Bucharest (Romania)	Walkover	(Turkey) Gazi Egitin	—	—
AMVJ Amsterdam (Netherlands)	120 - 125	(Hungary) MTK Budapest	62-57	58-68

== Round of 12 ==
Team #1	Agg.	Team #2	1st leg	2nd leg
Daugava Riga (Soviet Union)	Bye	—	—	—
Firestone Wien (Austria)	85 - 109	(Italy) Recoaro Vicenza	52-58	33-51
La Gerbe Montceau (France)	105 - 110	(Socialist Federal Republic of Yugoslavia) Trešnjevka	50-48	55-62
WBC Standard Liège (Belgium)	90 - 141	(Czechoslovakia) Sparta Prague	52-72	38-69
Riri Mendrisio (Switzerland)	111 - 146	(Poland) ŁKS Łódź	48-55	63-91
Politehnica Bucharest (Romania)	105 - 127	(Hungary) MTK Budapest	55-60	50-67

== Group stage ==
=== Group A ===
	Team	Pld	W	L	PF	PA
1.	(Soviet Union) Daugava Riga	4	4	0	328	182
2.	(Italy) Recoaro Vicenza	4	1	3	198	261
3.	(Socialist Federal Republic of Yugoslavia) Trešnjevka	4	1	3	210	293

Recoaro Vicenza	55-43 62-66	Trešnjevka
Daugava Riga	87-43 65-38	Recoaro Vicenza
Trešnjevka	50-88 51-88	Daugava Riga

=== Group B ===
	Team	Pld	W	L	PF	PA
1.	(Czechoslovakia) Sparta Prague	4	3	1	253	210
2.	(Poland) ŁKS Łódź	4	2	2	238	240
3.	(Hungary) MTK Budapest	4	1	3	218	249

ŁKS Łódź	70-62 45-65	Sparta Prague
MTK Budapest	62-50 51-73	ŁKS Łódź
Sparta Prague	69-47 57-48	MTK Budapest

== Semifinals ==
Team #1	Agg.	Team #2	1st leg	2nd leg
ŁKS Łódź (Poland)	90 - 184	(Soviet Union) Daugava Riga	46-95	44-75
Sparta Prague (Czechoslovakia)	125 - 100	(Italy) Recoaro Vicenza	75-41	50-59

== Final ==
Team #1	Agg.	Team #2	1st leg	2nd leg
Daugava Riga (Soviet Union)	134 - 92	(Czechoslovakia) Sparta Prague	76-45	58-47
