= 1985–86 FIBA Women's European Champions Cup =

International basketball competition

The 1985-86 FIBA Women's European Champions Cup was the 28th edition of FIBA Europe's competition for national champions women's basketball clubs, running from 3 October 1985 to 20 March 1986. Defending champion Primigi Vicenza defeated Agon Düsseldorf in a rematch of the 1983 edition's final to win its third title.

== Qualifying round ==
Team #1	Agg.	Team #2	1st	2nd
Sporting Athens (Greece)	145–141	(Switzerland) Esperance Sportive Pully	79–63	66–78
Tungsram Budapest (Hungary)	143–126	(Belgium) Charles Quint	80–64	63–62
Elitzur Holon (Israel)	126–174	(Romania) Universitatea Cluj	63–87	63–87
Naomh Muire (Republic of Ireland)	98–269	(Netherlands) Doppeldouche Den Helder	65–134	33–135
Besiktas (Turkey)	77–179	(Socialist Federal Republic of Yugoslavia) Partizan	34–89	43–90
Avon Northampton (United Kingdom)	103–177	(Finland) Sampo Lahti	47–83	56–94
Real Canoe (Spain)	112–145	(France) Stade Français	64–64	48–81
Høybråten (Norway)	109–150	(Czech Republic) Slavia Prague	59–75	50–75
Black Star Mersch (Luxembourg)	109–150	(Austria) UBLV Wien	55–66	57–94

== First round ==
Team #1	Agg.	Team #2	1st	2nd
Sporting Athens (Greece)	77–172	(Bulgaria) Levski Sofia	50–73	27–99
Tungsram Budapest (Hungary)	145–152	(Romania) Universitatea Cluj	84–66	61–86
Doppeldouche Den Helder (Netherlands)	132–174	(Socialist Federal Republic of Yugoslavia) Partizan	67–81	65–93
Sampo Lahti (Finland)	141–181	(Germany) Agon Düsseldorf	67–88	74–93
Wisla Krakow (Poland)	131–181	(France) Stade Françáis	67–88	64–93
UBLV Wien (Austria)	104–180	(Czech Republic) Slavia Prague	58–91	46–89

== Group stage ==
=== Group A ===
Team	Pld	W	L	PF	PA
(Italy) Primigi Vicenza	6	4	2	477	384
(Bulgaria) Levski Sofia	6	4	2	486	446
(Romania) Universitatea Cluj	6	4	2	474	491
(Socialist Federal Republic of Yugoslavia) Partizan	6	0	6	438	554

=== Group B ===
Team	Pld	W	L	PF	PA
(Germany) Agon Düsseldorf	6	6	0	436	382
(Soviet Union) CSKA Moscow	6	4	2	463	426
(France) Stade Français	6	2	4	409	431
(Czech Republic) Slavia Prague	6	0	6	376	445

== Semifinals ==
Team #1	Agg.	Team #2	1st	2nd
CSKA Moscow (Soviet Union)	128–151	(Italy) Primigi Vicenza	82–84	46–67
Levski Sofia (Bulgaria)	152–154	(Germany) Agon Düsseldorf	79–64	73–90

== Final ==
Team #1		Team #2
Primigi Vicenza (Italy)	71–57	(Germany) Agon Düsseldorf
