= 1997–98 EuroLeague Women =

The 1997–98 Euroleague Women was the second edition of the Euroleague era of FIBA's premier international competition for European women's basketball clubs. It ran between 1 October 1997 and 9 April 1998.

Defending champion and Final Four host Bourges Basket won its second title beating Pool Getafe in the final. Pool Comense and US Valenciennes Olympic also reached the Final Four, with the Italians attaining the bronze.

== Group stage ==
=== Group A ===
#	Team	Pld	W	L	PF	PA
1	(Spain) Pool Getafe	14	11	3	1052	897
2	(France) Bourges	14	10	4	997	807
3	(Italy) Pool Comense	14	10	4	961	869
4	(Slovakia) Ružomberok	14	8	6	1040	975
5	(Russia) CSKA Moscow	14	8	6	917	911
6	(Slovenia) Ježica	14	7	7	908	993
7	(Greece) Sporting Athens	14	1	13	811	1043
8	(Hungary) Ferencváros	14	1	13	905	1096

=== Group B ===
#	Team	Pld	W	L	PF	PA
1	(France) Valenciennes	14	11	3	1029	871
2	(Czech Republic) Brno	14	10	4	1091	965
3	(Germany) Wuppertal	14	8	6	1078	1044
4	(Federal Republic of Yugoslavia) Hemofarm	14	8	6	980	974
5	(Turkey) Galatasaray	14	7	7	929	946
6	(Italy) Parma	14	6	8	937	975
7	(Hungary) Pécs	14	5	9	1020	1066
8	(Ukraine) Kozachka	14	1	13	958	1181

== Quarter-finals ==
Team #1	Agg.	Team #2	1st	2nd	3rd
Bourges (France)	2–1	(Germany) Wuppertal	58–46	51–57	65–56
Valenciennes (France)	2–1	(Slovakia) Ružomberok	94–81	56–61	75–73
Pool Getafe (Spain)	2–0	(Federal Republic of Yugoslavia) Hemofarm	80–60	65–61	
Brno (Czech Republic)	0–2	(Italy) Pool Comense	67–75	67–74	

== Final four ==
- Bourges, France

Semi-finals
7 April
(France) Bourges	69
(France) Valenciennes	48
7 April
(Spain) Pool Getafe	73
(Italy) Pool Comense	69

Final
9 April
(France) Bourges	76
(Spain) Pool Getafe	64
Third place
9 April
(Italy) Pool Comense	74
(France) Valenciennes	69

== Individual statistics ==
=== Points ===
Rank	Name	Team	PPG
1.	(United States) Jennifer Gillom	(Turkey) Galatasaray	21.8
2.	(Australia) Sandra Brondello	(Germany) Wuppertal	19.1
2.	(Germany) Marlies Askamp	(Germany) Wuppertal	19.1
4.	(Czech Republic) Eva Nemcová	(Czech Republic) Brno	18.7
5.	(France) Isabelle Fijalkowski	(Italy) Pool Comense	18.4

=== Rebounds ===
Rank	Name	Team	PPG
1.	(Russia) Maria Stepanova	(Russia) CSKA Moscow	12.4
2.	(Germany) Marlies Askamp	(Germany) Wuppertal	11.1
2.	(United States) Cindy Brown	(France) Valenciennes	9.9
4.	(United States) Janice Braxton	(Italy) Parma	9.4
5.	(Russia) Elena Baranova	(Russia) CSKA Moscow	8.6

=== Assists ===
Rank	Name	Team	PPG
1.	(Russia) Ludmila Konovalova	(Russia) CSKA Moscow	5.9
2.	(Federal Republic of Yugoslavia) Danijela Ilić	(Slovenia) Ježica	5.4
2.	(France) Audrey Sauret	(France) Valenciennes	5.3
4.	(France) Yannick Souvré	(France) Bourges	4.1
5.	(Russia) Svetlana Antipova	(Russia) CSKA Moscow	3.6
