= 1958–59 FIBA Women's European Champions Cup =

International basketball competition

The 1958–59 European Cup*1958–59 FIBA Women's European Champions Cup was the inaugural edition of the premier European women's basketball competition for clubs. Nine teams took part in the competition, representing Bulgaria, Czechoslovakia, France, East Germany, West Germany, Poland, Romania, the Soviet Union and Yugoslavia.

It was the first of three editions won by Bulgarian teams, as Slavia Sofia defeated Dynamo Moscow in a two-legged final to bring the first ever European Cup to the Balkans.

== Results ==
Round of 16
(France) AS Montferrandaise	109
(West Germany) HTV Heidelberg	69
(East Germany) Wissenschaft Berlin	(w/o)
(Hungary) MTK Budapest

Quarterfinals
(France) AS Montferrandaise	67
(Czechoslovakia) Spartak Sokolovo Prague	84
(Romania) Constructorul Bucharest	88
(Bulgaria) Slavia Sofia	135
(Soviet Union) Dynamo Moscow	144
(Poland) AZS Warsaw	119
(East Germany) Wissenschaft Berlin	77
(Socialist Federal Republic of Yugoslavia) Crvena Zvezda Belgrade	99

Semifinals
(Czechoslovakia) Spartak Sokolovo Prague	105
(Bulgaria) Slavia Sofia	137
(Soviet Union) Dynamo Moscow	106
(Socialist Federal Republic of Yugoslavia) Crvena Zvezda Belgrade	67

Finals
(Bulgaria) Slavia Sofia	97
(Soviet Union) Dynamo Moscow	84

=== Qualification round ===
Team #1	Agg.	Team #2	1st leg	2nd leg
AS Montferrandaise (France)	109 – 69	(West Germany) HTV Heidelberg	54–37	55–32
Wissenschaft Berlin (East Germany)	Walkover	(Hungary) MTK Budapest	–	–

=== Quarterfinals ===
Team #1	Agg.	Team #2	1st leg	2nd leg
Constructorul București (Romania)	88 – 135	(Bulgaria) Slavia Sofia	46–60	42–75
AS Montferrandaise (France)	67 – 84	(Czechoslovakia) Spartak Sokolovo Prague	37–34	30–50
Wissenschaft Berlin (East Germany)	77 – 99	(Socialist Federal Republic of Yugoslavia) Crvena zvezda	31–33	46–66
Dynamo Moscow (Soviet Union)	144 – 119	(Poland) AZS Warsaw	73–65	71–54

=== Semifinals ===
Team #1	Agg.	Team #2	1st leg	2nd leg
Spartak Sokolovo Prague (Czechoslovakia)	105 – 137	(Bulgaria) Slavia Sofia	60–77	45–60
Dynamo Moscow (Soviet Union)	106 – 67	(Socialist Federal Republic of Yugoslavia) Crvena zvezda	58–33	48–34

=== Final ===
Team #1	Agg.	Team #2	1st leg	2nd leg
Slavia Sofia (Bulgaria)	97 – 84	(Soviet Union) Dynamo Moscow	63–40	34–44
