= 1959–60 FIBA Women's European Champions Cup =

Women's basketball tournament

The 1959–60 European Cup was the premier European women's basketball championship's second edition. Ten teams entered the competition, with defending champion Slavia Sofia receiving a bye for the semifinals.

Soviet champion Daugava Riga won the championship in its debut appearance, defeating Slavia Sofia in the final. It was the first of Daugava's record 18 titles.

== Qualification round ==
Team #1	Agg.	Team #2	1st leg	2nd leg
Heidelberg Berlin (East Germany)	80 – 146	(Poland) Wawel Kraków	33–67	47–79
Lokomotiv Sofia (Bulgaria)	111 – 81	(Romania) Ştiinţa București	58–37	53–44
AS Montferrandaise (France)	119 – 99	(Austria) HSG Wissenschaft	69–47	50–52

== Quarter-finals ==
Team #1	Agg.	Team #2	1st leg	2nd leg
Wawel Kraków (Poland)	93 – 135	(Soviet Union) Daugava Riga	48–65	45–70
Slovan Orbis Prague (Czechoslovakia)	128 – 118	(Bulgaria) Lokomotiv Sofia	71–54	57–64
AS Montferrandaise (France)	90 – 100	(Socialist Federal Republic of Yugoslavia) Crvena zvezda	52–32	38–68
Slavia Sofia (Bulgaria)	Bye		—	—

== Semifinals ==
Team #1	Agg.	Team #2	1st leg	2nd leg
Daugava Riga (Soviet Union)	132 – 116	(Czechoslovakia) Slovan Orbis Prague	57–46	75–70
Slavia Sofia (Bulgaria)	128 – 86	(Socialist Federal Republic of Yugoslavia) Crvena zvezda	63–48	65–38

== Final ==
Team #1	Agg.	Team #2	1st leg	2nd leg
Daugava Riga (Soviet Union)	111 – 71	(Bulgaria) Slavia Sofia	62–28	49–43
