= Stanislav Boyadzhiev =

Bulgarian basketball player (1945–2020)

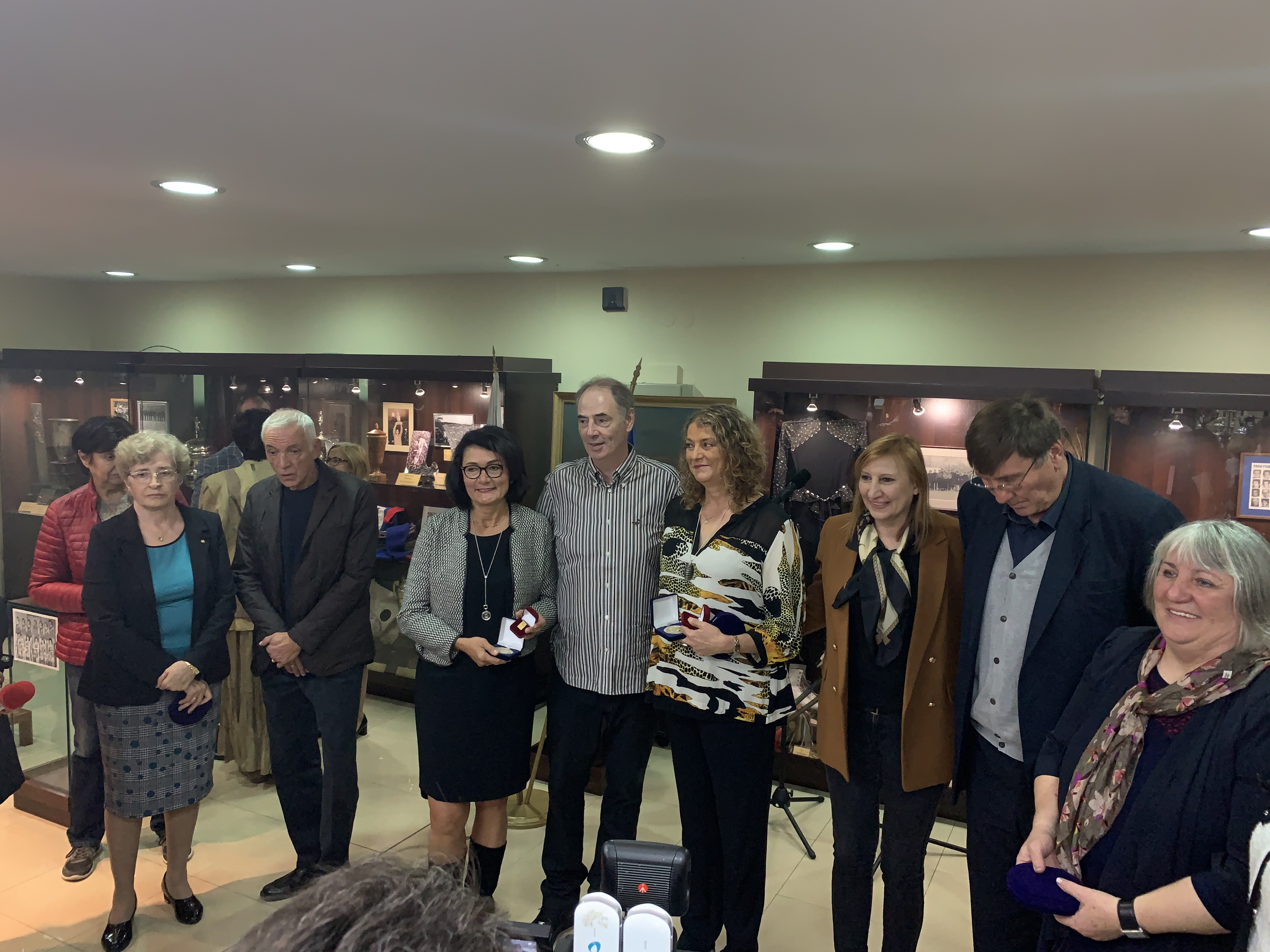
- Stanislav Boyadzhiev (second from left) at a basketball award ceremony (2019)

Personal information
- Born: 15 July 1945 Sofia, Bulgaria
- Died: 19 April 2020 (aged 74)

Career information
- Playing career: 1963–1976
- Coaching career: 1976–2002

Career history

Playing
- 1963-1965: (Bulgaria) Armeets Sofia
- 1965–1969: (Bulgaria) Lokomotiv Sofia
- 1969–1976: (Bulgaria) BC Levski Sofia

Coaching
- 1976–1986: (Bulgaria) BC Levski Sofia
- 1987–1988: (Cyprus) Keitan
- 1989–1990: (Bulgaria) BC Levski Sofia
- 1990–1991: (Kuwait) ЕНАТ
- 1992–1993: (France) Toulouse
- 1992–2002: (Bulgaria) BC Slavia Sofia

Stanislav Boyadzhiev (Bulgarian: Станислав Бояджиев, 15 July 1945 – 19 April 2020) was a Bulgarian basketball player. He competed in the men's tournament at the 1968 Summer Olympics.

At the 1968 Summer Olympics in Mexico City, Stanislav Boyadzhiev appeared in seven games, scoring a total of seven points. Over the course of his international career, he earned 113 caps with the Bulgarian national team. In 1966, while playing for Lokomotiv Sofia, he won the Bulgarian national championship. He additionally finished as a silver medalist on five occasions and secured two bronze medals in the Bulgarian Basketball Championship.

Boyadzhiev ended his playing career in 1976 and subsequently began working as a coach. Between 1976 and 2002, he coached women’s basketball teams in Bulgaria, Kuwait, Cyprus, and France. As a head coach, he guided Levski Spartak to five Bulgarian championship titles and contributed to Kremikovtsy winning one national title. His teams also captured six Bulgarian Cups, as well as one French Cup, achieved with Toulouse.

== Playing career ==
Stanislav Boyadzhiev began his basketball career in the early 1960s. Between 1969 and 1976, he played for Levski–Spartak Sofia, where he was one of the key players of the team during that period. Over the course of his club career, he won the Bulgarian Cup on five occasions and established himself as a regular member of the Bulgarian national setup.

Boyadzhiev retired from active competition in 1976, concluding a playing career that combined domestic success with extensive international experience.

=== National team ===
As a player, Boyadzhiev earned 113 appearances for the Bulgarian national basketball team. In 1968, he represented Bulgaria at the Summer Olympic Games in Mexico City, where he competed in seven matches. His long-standing presence in the national team reflected his consistency and importance in Bulgarian basketball during the 1960s and 1970s.

== Coaching career ==
After ending his playing career in 1976, Boyadzhiev transitioned into coaching. Although initial plans envisioned him leading the men’s team of Levski–Spartak, he was instead appointed head coach of the club’s women’s team, a decision that proved highly successful.

Between 1976 and 1986, and again in 1989–1990, Boyadzhiev guided Levski–Spartak’s women’s team through its most successful era. Under his leadership, the club won:

- Five Bulgarian Championships (1980, 1983, 1984, 1985, 1986)
- Five Bulgarian Cups (1980, 1982, 1983, 1985, 1986)
- Two Ronchetti Cup titles (1978, 1979)

The European Champions Cup, the most prestigious achievement in the club’s history, won on 8 March 1984 in Budapest after defeating Italian side Zolu Vicenza.

Boyadzhiev is widely regarded as one of the most successful coaches in Bulgarian women’s basketball, frequently ranked among the top five basketball coaches in Bulgaria. He was awarded the honorary titles “Merited Master of Sport” and “Merited Coach”.

As head coach of Levski–Spartak, he led the team during its most successful period in European competition, including victories in the Ronchetti Cup and domestic championships. These achievements continue to be commemorated decades later as milestones in the history of Bulgarian women’s basketball.

Following the end of his coaching career, he continued to contribute to Bulgarian basketball for many years, serving as Director of the Women’s Basketball Department at the Bulgarian Basketball Federation.

=== 1979 Ronchetti Cup victory ===
In 1979, Boyadzhiev led Levski–Spartak’s women’s team to victory in the Ronchetti Cup, one of the most prestigious European club competitions of the era. The final, held in Yambol, featured a unique all-Bulgarian matchup, with Levski–Spartak defeating Maritsa Plovdiv by a narrow margin. The match is remembered as the only Bulgarian final in a European women’s basketball tournament.

The triumph marked Levski–Spartak’s second consecutive Ronchetti Cup title, following their victory the previous year against Slovan Bratislava. Under Boyadzhiev’s leadership, the team established itself as a dominant force in European women’s basketball during the late 1970s, with several players forming the core of the Bulgarian national team at the time.

=== 1984 European Champions Cup victory ===
The pinnacle of Boyadzhiev’s coaching career came in 1984, when he led Levski–Spartak’s women’s team to victory in the European Champions Cup, the most prestigious club competition in European women’s basketball. The final was held in Budapest on 8 March 1984, where the Bulgarian side defeated Italian club Zolu Vicenza, then considered the dominant force in European basketball.

Levski–Spartak entered the final as underdogs, facing an opponent that had won the previous editions of the tournament. Despite this, the team established an early lead and ultimately secured the title after a closely contested match. The triumph is regarded as one of the greatest achievements in the history of Bulgarian team sports and remains the only European Champions Cup title won by a Bulgarian women’s basketball club.

Following the victory, the team and its head coach received widespread public recognition in Bulgaria, and the achievement continues to be commemorated as a landmark moment in the country’s basketball history.

== Legacy ==
In interviews reflecting on his career, Boyadzhiev emphasized the importance of historical continuity and institutional memory in Bulgarian basketball. He has been critical of the lack of archival preservation within the sport’s governing bodies and has argued that understanding past achievements is essential for future development.

Boyadzhiev is remembered as one of the most successful and influential coaches in the history of Bulgarian basketball. Beyond his achievements with Levski–Spartak, he contributed to the development of the sport internationally, including a successful period in France, where he led Toulouse from the lower divisions to the top tier and won the French Cup in 1996.

Following his death in April 2020, tributes highlighted both his competitive achievements and his long-term commitment to education, professional development, and the advancement of women’s basketball.
