= 1993–94 FIBA Women's European Champions Cup =

International basketball competition

The 1993-94 FIBA Women's European Champions Cup was the 36th edition of the competition. It was won by the Ginnastica Comense for the first time against Popular Basquet Godella, who couldn't defend the title for a second time, in a replay of the past season's final match. Format changes were introduced for this edition.

== Competition results ==
=== 1st Preliminary Round ===
Team 1	Agg.	Team 2	1st leg	2nd leg
Avesta-Sheffield Hatters (England)	110-127	(Portugal) Santarém City of the World	64-61	46-66
BCSS Namur (Belgium)	145-158	(Czech Republic) USK Prague	82-80	63-78
SC Tirana (Albania)	138-202	(Romania) Universitatea-Dacia Cluj	61-73	63-87
Selekta Hibernians Paola Malta	67-162	(France) Challes Savoie Basket	35-85	32-77
GoldZack Wuppertal (Germany)	239-133	(Luxembourg) BBC Etzella Ettelbruck	107-62	132-71
Sparbanken Arvika Basket (Sweden)	117-185	(Slovakia) SCP Ruzomberok	56-86	61-99
Forssan Alku (Finland)	122-187	(Netherlands) Texim Tonego Haaksbergen	61-82	61-105
Split (Croatia)	146-127	(Hungary) GYSEV Sopron	77-62	69-65
Montana (Bulgaria)	105-164	(Greece) Sporting Athens	45-70	60-94
AEL Limassol (Cyprus)	56-236	(Israel) Elitzur Holon	36-112	20-124
CSKA Moscow (Russia)	165-173	(Ukraine) Dynamo Kyiv	99-85	66-88
ASKÖ BSG Steyr (Austria)	103-191	(Slovenia) Ježica Ljubljana	57-91	46-100
ŽAKK Student Skopje (North Macedonia)	124-222	(Turkey) Galatasaray SK	60-103	64-119

=== 2nd Preliminary Round ===
Team 1	Agg.	Team 2	1st leg	2nd leg
Santarém City of the World (Portugal)	88-188	(Spain) Dorna Godella	50-98	38-90
USK Prague (Czech Republic)	117-182	(Italy) Ginnastica Comense	70-84	47-98
Universitatea-Dacia Cluj (Romania)	122-138	(France) Challes Savoie Basket	65-54	57-84
GoldZack Wuppertal (Germany)	152-136	(Slovakia) SCP Ruzomberok	92-69	60-67
Texim Tonego Haaksbergen (Netherlands)	139-151	(Poland) Olimpia Poznan	64-78	75-73
Split (Croatia)	115-129	(Greece) Sporting Athens	61-58	54-71
'Elitzur Holon (Israel)	141-136	(Ukraine) Dynamo Kyiv	90-68	51-60
Ježica Ljubljana (Slovenia)	162-160	(Turkey) Galatasaray SK	90-80	72-80

=== Semi-final Round ===
	Team	Pld	W	L	PF	PA
1.	(Italy) Ginnastica Comense	14	13	1	1108	792
2.	(Spain) Dorna Godella	14	12	2	1090	849
3.	(Germany) GoldZack Wuppertal	14	9	5	1051	1014
4.	(Poland) Olimpia Poznan	14	8	6	1011	1004
5.	(Slovenia) Ježica	14	5	9	918	1000
6.	(France) Challes Savoie Basket	14	4	10	847	931
7.	(Greece) Sporting Athens	14	4	10	867	1034
8.	(Israel) Elitzur Holon	14	1	13	867	1135

=== Quarter-finals ===
Team #1	Agg.	Team #2	1st leg	2nd leg	3rd leg^{*}
Elitzur Holon (Israel)	0 - 2	(Italy) Ginnastica Comense	69-73	45-101	
Jezica Ljubljana (Slovenia)	0 - 2	(Poland) Olimpia Poznan	64-65	65-70	
Sporting Athens (Greece)	0 - 2	(Spain) Dorna Godella	65-92	48-66	
Challes Savoie Basket (France)	0 - 2	(Germany) Goldzack Wuppertal	71-75	78-55	

- if necessary

=== Final Four ===
Semi-finals
(Italy) Ginnastica Comense	77
(Poland) Olimpia Poznan	62
(Spain) Dorna Godella	75
(Germany) GoldZack Wuppertal	62

Final
(Italy) Ginnastica Comense	79
(Spain) Dorna Godella	68
Third place
(Poland) Olimpia Poznan	72
(Germany) GoldZack Wuppertal	63

Euroleague 1993-94 Champions

Società Ginnastica Comense
First title
