= Raimonds Karnītis =

Latvian basketball player and coach

Personal information
- Born: 26 December 1929
- Died: 10 October 1999 (aged 69) Riga, Latvia

Career information
- Playing career: 1951–1962
- Coaching career: 1968–1986

Career history

Playing
- 1951–1953: Rīgas ASK
- ?: Spartaks Rīga
- ?: VEF Riga

Coaching
- 1968–1986: TTT Riga

Raimonds Karnītis (26 December 1929 – 10 October 1999) was a Latvian basketball player and coach. He was the head coach of the TTT Riga women's basketball team of the European Cup For Women's Champions Clubs.

== Career ==
=== Player ===
Karnītis played professionally for various teams in Latvia from 1951 to 1962, including Rīgas ASK (1951–1953), Spartaks Rīga and VEF Riga. He was part of the VEF Riga team that took third place in the USSR Premier Basketball League in 1960. Between 1948 and 1958, Karnītis participated in 65 games for the Latvia national basketball team.

=== Coach ===
Karnītis coached the TTT Riga (also known as Daugava Riga) team from 1968 to 1986. Under his leadership, the team won the European Cup For Women's Champions Clubs' championship 15 times and the Soviet Women's Basketball Championship 18 times.
