= Czechoslovak Women's Basketball Championship =

The Czechoslovak Women's Basketball Championship was the premier women's basketball league in former Czechoslovakia. Founded in 1933, it was disestablished 60 years later following the country's dissolution and replaced by the Czech League and the Slovak Extraliga replacing it. Sparta Praha was the most successful team in the championship with 23 titles between 1948 and 1987, followed by Slovan Orbis and Slavia VŠ Praha with nine. While the championship was mostly dominated by Czech teams, its four last editions were won by Slovakia's ŠKP Banská Bystrica and Ružomberok.

== List of champions ==
- 1933 VBVS Prague
- 1934 VBVS Prague
- 1935 VBVS Prague
- 1936 VBVS Prague
- 1937 Strakova Akademie
- 1938 Strakova Akademie
- 1939 Strakova Akademie
- 1940 Strakova Akademie
- 1941 UNCAS Prague
- 1942 UNCAS Prague
- 1943 UNCAS Prague
- 1944 UNCAS Prague
- 1946 Železničářky Hradec Králové
- 1947 Železničářky Hradec Králové
- 1948 Sparta Praha
- 1949 Sparta Praha
- 1950 Sparta Praha
- 1951 Žabovřesky Brno
- 1952 Sparta Praha
- 1953 Sparta Praha
- 1954 Slovan Orbis
- 1955 Slavia ITVS Praha
- 1956 Slovan Orbis
- 1957 Slovan Orbis
- 1958 Sparta Praha
- 1959 Slovan Orbis
- 1960 Slovan Orbis
- 1961 Slovan Orbis
- 1962 Slovan Orbis
- 1963 Sparta Praha
- 1964 Slovan Orbis
- 1965 Slovan Orbis
- 1966 Sparta Praha
- 1967 Sparta Praha
- 1968 Sparta Praha
- 1969 Sparta Praha
- 1970 Slavia VŠ Praha
- 1971 Sparta Praha
- 1972 Sparta Praha
- 1973 Slavia VŠ Praha
- 1974 Sparta Praha
- 1975 Sparta Praha
- 1976 Sparta Praha
- 1977 Sparta Praha
- 1978 Sparta Praha
- 1979 Sparta Praha
- 1980 Sparta Praha
- 1981 Sparta Praha
- 1982 Slavia VŠ Praha
- 1983 VŠ Praha
- 1984 VŠ Praha
- 1985 VŠ Praha
- 1986 Sparta Praha
- 1987 Sparta Praha
- 1988 VŠ Praha
- 1989 VŠ Praha
- 1990 TJ Slávia PF Banská Bystrica
- 1991 Ružomberok
- 1992 Ružomberok
- 1993 Ružomberok
