= Slavia Sofia (sports club) =

Bulgarian multi-sports club

- Full name: ОСК Славия София
- Founded: 1913
- Colours: Black, White
- Website: Club home page

United Sports Club Slavia (Bulgarian: Обединен спортен клуб Славия) is a multi-sports club from Sofia, Bulgaria, founded in 1913. It has sections for football, ice hockey and basketball.

== Departments ==
- HC Slavia Sofia, ice hockey team
- PFC Slavia Sofia, football team
- WBC Slavia Sofia, women's basketball team
