= 1992–93 FIBA Women's European Champions Cup =

International basketball competition

The 1992–93 FIBA Women's European Champions Cup was the 35th edition of the competition. It was won by defending champion Popular Basquet Godella beating Ginnastica Comense in the final. MBK Ružomberok and Challes Savoie Basket also reached the Final Four, with the Slovaks ranking third.

== Competition results ==
=== 1st Preliminary Round ===
Team 1	Agg.	Team 2	1st leg	2nd leg
BBC Etzella Ettelbruck (Luxembourg)	127-125	(Austria) Gustino Schnitzelplatzl Wels	69-63	58-62
BCSS Namur (Belgium)	145-128	(Switzerland) Fidefinanz Bellinzona	77-64	68-64

=== 2nd Preliminary Round ===
Team 1	Agg.	Team 2	1st leg	2nd leg
Etzella Ettelbruck (Luxembourg)	138-202	(Belgium) BCSS Namur	69-64	37-76
SC Tirana (Albania)	124-213	(Slovenia) Ježica Ljubljana	53-118	71-95
Horizont Minsk (Belarus)	–	(Federal Republic of Yugoslavia) Crvena zvezda	-	-
PVSK-Co-order (Hungary)	151-122	(Greece) Apollon Kalamarias	75-46	76-76
GTU Tbilisi (Georgia (country))	100-130	(Romania) Universitatea-Dacia Cluj	59-75	41-55
Elitzur Holon (Israel)	119-143	(Italy) Ginnastica Comense	60-64	59-79
Split (Croatia)	134-137	(Turkey) Galatasaray S.K.	75-65	59-72
Amocom Chişinău (Moldova)	144-150	(France) Challes Savoie Basket	63-69	81-81
MTK Polfa Pabianice (Poland)	191-144	(Germany) Lotus Munich	104-65	87-79
Forssan Alku (Finland)	163-201	(Czechoslovakia) SCP Ružomberok	91-98	72-103

=== 3rd Preliminary Round ===
Team 1	Agg.	Team 2	1st leg	2nd leg
BCSS Namur (Belgium)	63-169	(Spain) Dorna Godella	36-71	27-98
Ježica Ljubljana (Slovenia)	133-134	(Ukraine) Dynamo Kyiv	73-74	60-60
Horizont Minsk (Belarus)	133-138	(Hungary) PVSK-Co-order	60-78	73-60
Universitatea-Dacia Cluj (Romania)	112-169	(Italy) Ginnastica Comense	49-76	63-93
Galatasaray S.K. (Turkey)	141-146	(France) Challes Savoie Basket	73-70	68-76
MTK Polfa Pabianice (Poland)	176-182	(Czechoslovakia) SCP Ružomberok	111-92	65-90

=== Semi-final Round ===
	Team	Pld	W	L	PF	PA
1.	(Italy) Ginnastica Comense	10	8	2	835	627
2.	(Spain) Dorna Godella	10	8	2	810	672
3.	(France) Challes Savoie Basket	10	5	5	668	666
4.	(Slovakia) SCP Ružomberok	10	5	5	776	776
5.	(Ukraine) Dynamo Kyiv	10	4	6	731	767
6.	(Hungary) PVSK-Co-order	10	0	10	623	935

=== Final Four ===
Semi-finals
(Italy) Ginnastica Comense	85
(Slovakia) SCP Ružomberok	72
(Spain) Dorna Godella	74
(France) Challes Savoie Basket	63

Final
(Italy) Ginnastica Comense	58
(Spain) Dorna Godella	66
Third place
(France) Challes Savoie	72
(Slovakia) SCP Ružomberok	52

Euroleague 1991–92 Champions
Dorna Godella
Second title
