= 1960–61 FIBA Women's European Champions Cup =

International basketball competition

The 1960–61 Women's Basketball European Cup was the third edition of the competition. 1960 champion Daugava Riga beat Czechoslovakia's Slovan Orbis Prague in the final, becoming the first team to successfully defend their title.

This edition marked the first appearance of Morocco, Portugal and Spain in the competition. Israel and Switzerland were scheduled to take part, but both teams retired before they could make their debut. Yugoslavia was a noted absence, while France's Paris UC also retired after beating the 1st Qualification Round.

This edition saw the first match between two team from the same nation in the history of the competition, with a Daugava Riga – USK Tartu tie in the semifinals. Daugava and Tartu were respectively the champion and runner-up of the 1960 Soviet Championship.

== First Qualification round ==
Team #1	Agg.	Team #2	1st leg	2nd leg
Picadero JC (Spain)	69 – 80	(Morocco) Casablanca SC	37–36	32–44
Academica Coimbra (Portugal)	39 – 144	(France) Paris UC	22–74	17–70

== Second Qualification round ==
Team #1	Agg.	Team #2	1st leg	2nd leg
Rapid București (Romania)	83 – 115	(Poland) Akademika Warsaw	39–38	44–77
Akademik Sofia (Bulgaria)	Walkover	(Israel) Maccabi Tel Aviv	—	—
Casablanca SC (Morocco)	Walkover	(France) Paris UC	—	—
Slovan Orbis Prague (Czechoslovakia)	Walkover	(Switzerland) Schen	—	—

== Quarter-finals ==
Team #1	Agg.	Team #2	1st leg	2nd leg
Daugava Riga (Soviet Union)	Bye		—	—
USK Tartu (Soviet Union)	128 – 90	(East Germany) Chemie Halle	73–49	55–41
WBC Akademik Sofia (Bulgaria)	137 – 136	(Poland) Akademika Warsaw	77–69	60–67
Slovan Orbis Prague (Czechoslovakia)	136 – 68	(Morocco) Casablanca SC	80–42	56–26

== Semi-finals ==
Team #1	Agg.	Team #2	1st leg	2nd leg
Daugava Riga (Soviet Union)	128 – 90	(Soviet Union) USK Tartu	73–49	55–41
Akademik Sofia (Bulgaria)	124 – 129	(Czechoslovakia) Slovan Orbis Prague	72–66	52–63

== Final ==
Team #1	Agg.	Team #2	1st leg	2nd leg
Slovan Orbis Prague (Czechoslovakia)	114 – 148	(Soviet Union) Daugava Riga	77–76 OT	37–72
