= Uljana Semjonova =

Latvian basketball player (1952–2026)

Uļjana Semjonova
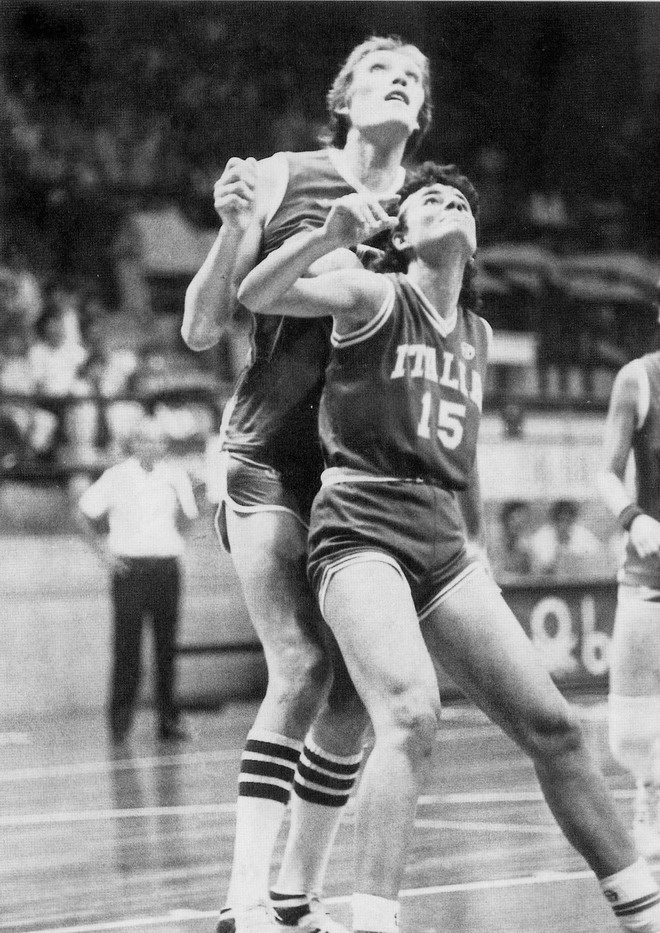
- Stefania Passaro boxing out Semjonova in 1982

Personal information
- Born: 9 March 1952 Zarasai, Lithuanian SSR, Soviet Union
- Died: 8 January 2026 (aged 73) Riga, Latvia
- Listed height: 213 cm (7 ft 0 in)
- Listed weight: 127 kg (280 lb)

Career information
- Playing career: 1968–1989
- Position: Center

Career history
- 1968–1987: TTT Riga
- 1987–1988: Tintoretto Getafe
- 1988–1989: Valenciennes-Orchies

Career highlights
- Order of the Red Banner of Labour (1976)
- Basketball Hall of Fame
- Women's Basketball Hall of Fame
- FIBA Hall of Fame
Medals
Representing Soviet Union
Olympic Games
Gold medal – first place	1976 Montreal	Team
Gold medal – first place	1980 Moscow	Team
World Championships
Gold medal – first place	1971 Brazil	Team
Gold medal – first place	1975 Colombia	Team
Gold medal – first place	1983 Brazil	Team
European Championships
Gold medal – first place	1968 Italy	Team
Gold medal – first place	1970 Netherlands	Team
Gold medal – first place	1972 Bulgaria	Team
Gold medal – first place	1974 Italy	Team
Gold medal – first place	1976 France	Team
Gold medal – first place	1978 Poland	Team
Gold medal – first place	1980 Yugoslavia	Team
Gold medal – first place	1981 Italy	Team
Gold medal – first place	1983 Hungary	Team
Gold medal – first place	1985 Italy	Team

Uļjana Semjonova (Russian: Ульяна Ларионовна Семёнова, romanized: Ulyana Larionovna Semyonova; 9 March 1952 – 8 January 2026) was a Latvian basketball player of Old Believer descent who competed for the Soviet Union.

== Career ==
Semjonova was the leading women's basketball player in the world in the 1970s and 1980s. Wearing a men's size 21 (US) / 58 (EU) shoe, she was known for having the largest feet ever in women's basketball. For almost all of her playing career, she played for TTT Riga, which was part of Daugava Voluntary Sports Society. With TTT, she won 15 championships in the Soviet Union and the European Champion's Cup 15 times. Semjonova was also very dominant in international play, winning two Olympic Gold medals while playing for the USSR in 1976 and 1980 and never lost a game in official international competition.

Between 1968 and 1985, she played 100 games for the Soviet Union, scoring 1614 points, committing 174 personal fouls and making 162 of 249 free throws.

== Later life and death ==
Between 1991 and 2023, Semjonova was the head of the Latvian Olympic Social Fund, whose aim is to help retired athletes financially.

Later in life, she suffered from numerous medical complications. In 2017, she had cardiac surgery and was hospitalized for a fall. In 2022, she had her leg amputated and was placed under class-2 disability.

Semjonova died on 8 January 2026, at the age of 73.

== Honours ==
Semjonova was awarded the Order of the Red Banner of Labour in 1976, and in 1993 became the first non-US woman enshrined into the Basketball Hall of Fame. She was an inaugural member of the Women's Basketball Hall of Fame in the class of 1999. In 2007, she was enshrined in the FIBA Hall of Fame. During the 2007 Latvian sports personality of the year award ceremony, Semjonova received the Lifetime Achievement Award for her contributions to sports.

== In popular culture ==
Semjonova is the subject of a 2026 biographical film, Ulya, directed by Viestur Kairish. In the film, Semjonova is played by Latvian actor Kārlis Arnolds Avots.
