= Piero Pasini =

Italian basketball coach (1942–2026)

Piero Pasini (31 May 1942 – 8 June 2026), also known as Topone, was an Italian basketball coach.

== Biography ==
In 1974, he joined the technical staff of Pallacanestro Vigevano in Serie A2 as head coach at the end of the 1976–77 season. He then transferred to Serie B, as a coach for Livorno Basketball. After a year with Brindisi in A2 and a period at Benetton Treviso, he began working in women's basketball, winning a championship and a European Cup with Zolu Vicenza.

He remained a coach in women's basketball until 2024.

Pasini died on 8 June 2026, at the age of 84.
