= EuroLeague Women =

Pre-eminent basketball league in Europe for women's basketball clubs

FIBA EuroLeague Women
- Organising body: FIBA Europe
- First season: 1958
- Region: Europe
- Number of teams: 16 (group stage); 21 (total)
- Level on pyramid: Top women's league in Europe
- Related competitions: EuroCup Women
- Current champions: (Turkey) Fenerbahçe (3rd title)
- Most championships: (Soviet Union) Daugava Riga (18 titles)
- Website: FIBA.basketball/euroleaguewomen
- 2026–27 EuroLeague Women

The EuroLeague Women (officially known as the FIBA EuroLeague Women) is the pre-eminent basketball league in Europe for women's basketball clubs.

Unlike the EuroLeague Men, the competition is entirely organized by FIBA Europe.

== History ==
EuroLeague Women is the main women's club basketball competition in Europe.

First established by FIBA in September 1958, the inaugural European women's club competition consisted of 10 teams and came about following the success of an equivalent tournament for men's clubs earlier in the same year. The men's tournament consisted of 46 games, with over 100,000 spectators turning out to watch.

At the initial tournament Slavia Sofia of Bulgaria were crowned champions, beating Soviet Dynamo Moscow 64–40 at home and then 44–34 on the Muscovites court. The two-game home-and-away format for the final remained until 1976, before changing to a single-game format the following year.

During its formative years, the tournament was dominated by Daugava Riga from Latvia (then Soviet Union) who appeared in 16 finals between 1960 and 1977, winning all 16 of them. The Latvian club maintains two records that are difficult to see being bettered, with 18 overall titles, as well as the record for winning 12 consecutive championships.

In the nineties, the competition underwent two key changes. The first was the introduction of the Final Four in 1992; and the second was the rebranding of the competition in 1996, when it went from being known as European Cup for Women's Champion Clubs to what it is known as today: EuroLeague Women.

The Final Four format was given its farewell in Ekaterinburg in 2011, when Halcón Avenida defeated Spartak Moscow Region 68–59; before the 2011/2012 season heralded in a new direction for EuroLeague Women with the Final Four replaced by a Final Eight tournament.

Istanbul were granted the honour of hosting the first Final Eight tournament where Spanish club Ros Casares Valencia prevailed victorious, defeating Rivas Ecópolis 65–52 in the final. In its second year, the EuroLeague Women Final Eight moved to Ekaterinburg, where tournament hosts UMMC Ekaterinburg prevailed 82–56 over Fenerbahçe in the final.

In February 2022, the Russian teams and officials were expelled from the tournament by FIBA for the playoffs due to the country's invasion of Ukraine. EuroLeague Women suspended Russian clubs UMMC Ekaterinburg, Dynamo Kursk, and MBA Moscow.

=== Names of the competition ===
- FIBA Women's European Champions Cup: (1958–1996)
- EuroLeague Women: (1996–present)

== Format ==
=== 2004–2011 ===
The 24 clubs were divided into four groups of six teams, each with home and away games.

The four best-placed clubs in each group qualified for the eighth-final play-offs.

The Eighth-finals were established according to the standings (games won, games lost, goal-average) of each team in the preliminary round. This round was played in a home and away game.

The winners of the eighth-final round qualified for the quarter-final round.

The winners of the quarter-final round qualified for the Final Four, organized by one of the qualified clubs. The semi-finals were played on a Friday and the finals on a Sunday.

=== 2011–2014 ===
The teams were split in three groups, which played each other home and away.

The best team qualified directly to the Final Eight, whereas the next best 14 teams advanced to a play-off round. The Final Eight was played over two groups in a single venue, with the best teams advancing to the Final Four.

=== 2014–present ===
The teams are divided into two groups, each with home and away games. The top four teams from each group advance to the quarter-finals, played over three games, and the winners advance to the Final Four.

For the 2020–21 season, teams were divided into four groups of four teams. The two-group format returned for the 2021–22 season.

== Results ==
1. 1958–1996: FIBA Women's European Champions Cup
2. 1997–ongoing: EuroLeague Women

#	Year	Final			Third and fourth place	
#	Year	Champion	Score	Runners-up		
Have not a third place match / Semifinal losers
1	1958–59; Details	(Bulgaria); Slavia Sofia	97–84; 63–40 / 34–44	(Soviet Union); Dynamo Moscow	(Czechoslovakia); Spartak Sokolovo	(Socialist Federal Republic of Yugoslavia); Crvena zvezda
2	1959–60; Details	(Soviet Union); Daugava Rīga	111–71; 62–28 / 49–43	(Bulgaria); Slavia Sofia	(Czechoslovakia); Slovan Orbis Prague	(Socialist Federal Republic of Yugoslavia); Crvena zvezda
3	1960–61; Details	(Soviet Union); Daugava Rīga	148–114; 76–77 / 72–37	(Czechoslovakia); Slovan Orbis Prague	(Soviet Union); USK Tartu	(Bulgaria); Academic
4	1961–62; Details	(Soviet Union); Daugava Rīga	103–82; 55–38 / 48–44	(Soviet Union); SKA Leningrad	(Czechoslovakia); Slovan Orbis Prague	(Socialist Federal Republic of Yugoslavia); Radnički Belgrade
5	1962–63; Details	(Bulgaria); Slavia Sofia	112–106; 52–57 / 60–49	(Czechoslovakia); Slovan Orbis Prague	(Soviet Union); Daugava Rīga	(Hungary); MTK
6	1963–64; Details	(Soviet Union); Daugava Rīga	103–101; 63–58 / 40–43	(Czechoslovakia); Spartak Sokolovo	(Bulgaria); Slavia Sofia	(Socialist Federal Republic of Yugoslavia); Crvena zvezda
7	1964–65; Details	(Soviet Union); Daugava Rīga	101–93; 49–31 / 52–62	(Bulgaria); Slavia Sofia	(Poland); Wisła Kraków	(Czechoslovakia); Slovan Orbis Prague
8	1965–66; Details	(Soviet Union); Daugava Rīga	135–95; 62–39 / 73–56	(Czechoslovakia); Slovan Orbis Prague	(Poland); Wisła Kraków	(Bulgaria); Slavia Sofia
9	1966–67; Details	(Soviet Union); Daugava Rīga	111–93; 56–41 / 55–52	(Czechoslovakia); Sparta Prague	(Bulgaria); Academic	(Poland); Wisła Kraków
10	1967–68; Details	(Soviet Union); Daugava Rīga	134–92; 76–45 / 58–47	(Czechoslovakia); Sparta Prague	(Poland); Łódź	(Italy); Recoaro Vicenza
11	1968–69; Details	(Soviet Union); Daugava Rīga	144–105; 62–48 / 82–57	(East Germany); Chemie Halle	(Romania); Politehnica București	(Bulgaria); Academic
12	1969–70; Details	(Soviet Union); Daugava Rīga	120–87; 61–45 / 59–42	(Poland); Wisła Kraków	(Bulgaria); Academic	(Czechoslovakia); Sparta Prague
13	1970–71; Details	(Soviet Union); Daugava Rīga	134–115; 72–59 / 62–56	(France); Clermont	(Bulgaria); Academic	(Poland); Wisła Kraków
14	1971–72; Details	(Soviet Union); Daugava Rīga	166–118; 80–59 / 86–59	(Czechoslovakia); Sparta Prague	(Italy); Geas	(France); Clermont
15	1972–73; Details	(Soviet Union); Daugava Rīga	147–104; 64–44 / 83–60	(France); Clermont	(Czechoslovakia); Sparta Prague	(Italy); Geas
16	1973–74; Details	(Soviet Union); Daugava Rīga	164–120; 96–67 / 69–53	(France); Clermont	(Poland); Łódź	(Romania); Politehnica București
17	1974–75; Details	(Soviet Union); Daugava Rīga	159–115; 87–59 / 72–56	(Czechoslovakia); Sparta Prague	(Italy); Geas	(France); Clermont
18	1975–76; Details	(Czechoslovakia); Sparta Prague	132–115; 55–58 / 77–57	(France); Clermont	(Italy); Geas	(Bulgaria); Academic
19	1976–77; Details	(Soviet Union); Daugava Rīga	76–53	(France); Clermont	(Italy); Geas	(Czechoslovakia); Sparta Prague
20	1977–78; Details	(Italy); Sesto Geas	74–66	(Czechoslovakia); Sparta Prague	(Socialist Federal Republic of Yugoslavia); Crvena zvezda	(Bulgaria); Minyor Pernik
21	1978–79; Details	(Socialist Federal Republic of Yugoslavia); Crvena zvezda	97–62	(Hungary); BSE	(Bulgaria); Minyor Pernik	(Italy); Sesto Geas
22	1979–80; Details	(Italy); FIAT	75–66	(Bulgaria); Minyor Pernik	(Netherlands); BOB Oud-Beijerland	(Socialist Federal Republic of Yugoslavia); Crvena zvezda
23	1980–81; Details	(Soviet Union); Daugava Rīga	83–65	(Socialist Federal Republic of Yugoslavia); Crvena zvezda	(Bulgaria); Levski-Spartak	(Italy); Accorsi FIAT
24	1981–82; Details	(Soviet Union); Daugava Rīga	78–56	(Bulgaria); Minyor Pernik	(Italy); Pagnossin Treviso	(Hungary); BSE
25	1982–83; Details	(Italy); Zolu Vicenza	76–67	(West Germany); Agon 08 Düsseldorf	(Socialist Federal Republic of Yugoslavia); Monting	(Soviet Union); Daugava Rīga
26	1983–84; Details	(Bulgaria); Levski Sofia	82–77	(Italy); Zolu Vicenza	(Czechoslovakia); VŠ Praha	(Hungary); Tungsram
27	1984–85; Details	(Italy); Fiorella Vicenza	63–55	(Soviet Union); Daugava Rīga	(West Germany); Agon 08 Düsseldorf	(Bulgaria); Levski-Spartak
28	1985–86; Details	(Italy); Primigi Vicenza	71–57	(West Germany); Agon 08 Düsseldorf	(Soviet Union); CSKA Moscow	(Bulgaria); Levski-Spartak
29	1986–87; Details	(Italy); Primigi Vicenza	86–73	(Soviet Union); Dynamo Novosibirsk	(West Germany); Agon 08 Düsseldorf	(Bulgaria); Levski-Spartak
Round format
30	1987–88; Details	(Italy); Primigi Vicenza	70–64	(Soviet Union); Dynamo Novosibirsk	(Socialist Federal Republic of Yugoslavia); Jedinstvo Tuzla	(West Germany); Agon 08 Düsseldorf
31	1988–89; Details	(Socialist Federal Republic of Yugoslavia); Jedinstvo Tuzla	74–70	(Italy); Primigi Vicenza	(Soviet Union); Dynamo Novosibirsk	(France); Astarac Mirande
32	1989–90; Details	(Italy); Enimont Libertas Trogylos	86–71	(Soviet Union); CSKA Moscow	(Socialist Federal Republic of Yugoslavia); Crvena zvezda	(France); Astarac Mirande
Have a third place match
33	1990–91; Details	(Italy); Conad Cesena	84–66	(Sweden); Arvika	(Greece); Sporting	(Soviet Union); Elektrosila
34	1991–92; Details	(Spain); Dorna Godella	66–56	(Commonwealth of Independent States); Dynamo Kyiv	(Italy); Pool Comense	(Greece); Sporting
35	1992–93; Details	(Spain); Dorna Godella	66–58	(Italy); Pool Comense	(France); Challes-les-Eaux	(Slovakia); Ružomberok
36	1993–94; Details	(Italy); Pool Comense	79–68	(Spain); Dorna Godella	(Poland); Olimpia Poznań	(Germany); GoldZack Wuppertal
37	1994–95; Details	(Italy); Pool Comense	64–57	(Spain); Dorna Godella	(Russia); CSKA Moscow	(France); Valenciennes Olympic
38	1995–96; Details	(Germany); Wuppertal	76–62	(Italy); Pool Comense	(Slovakia); Ružomberok	(France); Bourges
39	1996–97; Details	(France); Bourges	71–52	(Germany); Wuppertal	(Slovakia); Ružomberok	(Italy); Pool Comense
40	1997–98; Details	(France); Bourges	76–64	(Spain); Pool Getafe	(Italy); Pool Comense	(France); Valenciennes Olympic
41	1998–99; Details	(Slovakia); Ružomberok	63–48	(Italy); Pool Comense	(Turkey); Galatasaray	(Germany); Wuppertal
42	1999–00; Details	(Slovakia); Ružomberok	67–64	(France); Bourges	(Czech Republic); Gambrinus BVV Brno	(Russia); Dynamo Moscow
43	2000–01; Details	(France); Bourges	73–71	(France); Valenciennes Olympic	(Hungary); Pécs	(Czech Republic); Gambrinus Brno
44	2001–02; Details	(France); Valenciennes Olympic	78–72	(Poland); Lotos VBW Clima Gdynia	(Italy); Lavezzini Parma	(Slovakia); Ružomberok
45	2002–03; Details	(Russia); UMMC Ekaterinburg	82–80	(France); Valenciennes Olympic	(Czech Republic); Gambrinus Brno	(France); Bourges
46	2003–04; Details	(France); Valenciennes Olympic	93–69	(Poland); Lotos VBW Clima Gdynia	(Hungary); Pécs	(Czech Republic); Gambrinus Brno
47	2004–05; Details	(Russia); VBM-SGAU Samara	69–66	(Czech Republic); Gambrinus Brno	(Lithuania); Lietuvos Telekomas	(Hungary); Pécs
48	2005–06; Details	(Czech Republic); Gambrinus Brno	68–54	(Russia); VBM-SGAU Samara	(France); Valenciennes Olympic	(Lithuania); Lietuvos Telekomas
49	2006–07; Details	(Russia); Spartak Moscow Region	76–62	(Spain); Ros Casares Valencia	(Russia); CSKA Samara	(France); Bourges
50	2007–08; Details	(Russia); Spartak Moscow Region	75–60	(Czech Republic); Gambrinus Brno	(Russia); UMMC Ekaterinburg	(France); Bourges
51	2008–09; Details	(Russia); Spartak Moscow Region	85–70	(Spain); Avenida	(Russia); UMMC Ekaterinburg	(Hungary); Euroleasing Sopron
52	2009–10; Details	(Russia); Spartak Moscow Region	87–80	(Spain); Ros Casares Valencia	(Russia); UMMC Ekaterinburg	(Poland); Can Pack Wisła Kraków
53	2010–11; Details	(Spain); Halcón Avenida	68–59	(Russia); Spartak Moscow Region	(Russia); UMMC Ekaterinburg	(Spain); Ros Casares Valencia
54	2011–12; Details	(Spain); Ros Casares Valencia	65–52	(Spain); Rivas Ecópolis	(Russia); UMMC Ekaterinburg	(Turkey); Fenerbahçe
55	2012–13; Details	(Russia); UMMC Ekaterinburg	82–56	(Turkey); Fenerbahçe	(France); Bourges	(Slovakia); Good Angels Košice
56	2013–14; Details	(Turkey); Galatasaray	69–58	(Turkey); Fenerbahçe	(Russia); UMMC Ekaterinburg	(France); Bourges
57	2014–15; Details	(Czech Republic); USK Praha	72–68	(Russia); UMMC Ekaterinburg	(Russia); Dynamo Kursk	(Turkey); Fenerbahçe
58	2015–16; Details	(Russia); UMMC Ekaterinburg	72–69	(Russia); Nadezhda Orenburg	(Turkey); Fenerbahçe	(Czech Republic); USK Praha
59	2016–17; Details	(Russia); Dynamo Kursk	77–63	(Turkey); Fenerbahçe	(Russia); UMMC Ekaterinburg	(Czech Republic); USK Praha
60	2017–18; Details	(Russia); UMMC Ekaterinburg	72–53	(Hungary); Sopron Basket	(Russia); Dynamo Kursk	(Turkey); Yakın Doğu Üniversitesi
61	2018–19; Details	(Russia); UMMC Ekaterinburg	91–67	(Russia); Dynamo Kursk	(Czech Republic); ZVVZ USK Praha	(Hungary); Sopron Basket
62	2019–20; Details	Curtailed and voided due to the COVID-19 pandemic.				
63	2020–21; Details	(Russia); UMMC Ekaterinburg	78–68	(Spain); Perfumerías Avenida	(Turkey); Fenerbahçe	(Hungary); Sopron Basket
64	2021–22; Details	(Hungary); Sopron Basket	60–55	(Turkey); Fenerbahçe	(Spain); Perfumerías Avenida	(Czech Republic); ZVVZ USK Praha
65	2022–23; Details	(Turkey); Fenerbahçe	99–60	(Turkey); ÇBK Mersin Yenişehir Bld.	(Italy); Beretta Famila Schio	(Czech Republic); ZVVZ USK Praha
66	2023–24; Details	(Turkey); Fenerbahçe	106–73	(France); ESBVA-LM	(Czech Republic); ZVVZ USK Praha	(Turkey); ÇBK Mersin Yenişehir Bld.
67	2024–25; Details	(Czech Republic); ZVVZ USK Praha	66–53	(Turkey); ÇBK Mersin	(Turkey); Fenerbahçe	(Spain); Valencia
68	2025–26; Details	(Turkey); Fenerbahçe	68–55	(Turkey); Galatasaray	(Spain); Casademont Zaragoza	(Spain); SPAR Girona

== Statistics ==
=== Medals by country ===
Rank	Nation	Gold	Silver	Bronze	Total
1	Soviet Union	18	6	5	29
2	Russia	12	5	11	28
3	Italy	11	5	13	29
4	France	5	9	5	19
5	Spain	4	8	2	14
6	Turkey	4	7	4	15
7	Bulgaria	3	4	14	21
8	Czech Republic	3	2	4	9
9	Yugoslavia	2	1	9	12
10	Slovakia	2	0	2	4
11	Czechoslovakia	1	9	8	18
12	Germany	1	3	2	6
13	Hungary	1	2	5	8
14	Poland	0	3	7	10
15	CIS	0	1	0	1
15	East Germany	0	1	0	1
15	Sweden	0	1	0	1
18	Romania	0	0	2	2
19	Greece	0	0	1	1
19	Lithuania	0	0	1	1
19	Netherlands	0	0	1	1
Totals (21 entries)		67	67	96	230

- Semifinal losers from 1958 to 1987 considered as bronze.

=== Titles by club ===
Rank	Club	Winners	Runners-up
1	(Soviet Union) Daugava Rīga	18	1
2	(Russia) UMMC Ekaterinburg	6	1
3	(Italy) Vicenza	5	2
4	(Russia) Spartak Moscow Region	4	1
5	(Turkey) Fenerbahçe	3	4
6	(France) CJM Bourges Basket	3	1
7	(Spain) CB Godella-Pool Getafe	2	3
=	(Italy) Pool Comense 1872	2	3
9	(France) Valenciennes Olympic	2	2
=	(Bulgaria) Slavia Sofia	2	2
11	(Slovakia) Ružomberok	2	0
=	(Czech Republic) USK Praha	2	0
13	(Czech Republic) Sparta Prague	1	6
14	(Czech Republic) Brno	1	2
=	(Spain) Avenida	1	2
=	(Spain) Ros Casares Valencia	1	2
17	(Germany) Wuppertal Wings	1	1
=	(Socialist Federal Republic of Yugoslavia) Crvena zvezda	1	1
=	(Russia) VBM-SGAU Samara	1	1
=	(Russia) Dynamo Kursk	1	1
=	(Hungary) Sopron Basket	1	1
=	(Turkey) Galatasaray	1	1
23	(Bulgaria) Levski Sofia	1	0
=	(Italy) FIAT	1	0
=	(Italy) Unicar Cesena	1	0
=	(Italy) GS Trogylos Basket Priolo	1	0
=	(Italy) Sesto San Giovanni	1	0
=	(Socialist Federal Republic of Yugoslavia) Jedinstvo Tuzla	1	0

== Stats leaders ==
Season	Top scorer	PPG	Top rebounder	RPG	Top assistant	APG
1991–92	(Bosnia and Herzegovina) Razija Mujanović	27.3	(Bosnia and Herzegovina) Razija Mujanović	9.1	(France) Corinne Benintendi	2.7
1992–93	(Russia) Yelena Khudashova	24.8	(United States) Katrina Johnson	11.6	(France) Corinne Benintendi	5.1
1993–94	(Bosnia and Herzegovina) Razija Mujanović	20.4	(United States) Katrina Johnson	12.7	(France) Corinne Benintendi	5.2
1994–95	(United States) Clarissa Davis	30.5	(Russia) Yelena Baranova	9.9	(United States) Teresa Weatherspoon	6.0
1995–96	(United States) Clarissa Davis	25.9	(United States) Venus Lacy	12.7	(Russia) Svetlana Antipova	6.6
1996–97	(United States) Yolanda Griffith	24.7	(United States) Yolanda Griffith	17.1	(Australia) Michele Timms	5.7
1997–98	(United States) Jennifer Gillom	21.8	(Russia) Maria Stepanova	12.4	(Russia) Lyudmila Konovalova	5.9
1998–99	(Australia) Sandy Brondello	19.5	(Germany) Marlies Askamp	12.3	(Spain) Ana Belén Álvaro	4.8
1999–00	(Federal Republic of Yugoslavia) Mila Nikolić	19.1	(Poland) Margo Dydek	10.6	(Israel) Aluma Goren	4.4
2000–01	(Belgium) Ann Wauters	20.9	(Poland) Margo Dydek	10.7	(Slovakia) Iveta Bieliková	5.7
2001–02	(Bulgaria) Albena Branzova	20.8	(United States) Yolanda Griffith	11.5	(Portugal) Ticha Penicheiro	5.3
2002–03	(Serbia and Montenegro) Ana Joković	21.1	(Poland) Margo Dydek	10.4	(France) Audrey Sauret-Gillespie	4.8
2003–04	(Serbia and Montenegro) Gordana Grubin	20.5	(Russia) Maria Stepanova	12.2	(Australia) Kristi Willoughby	5.9
2004–05	(United States) Katie Douglas	20.4	(United States) Michelle Snow	13.6	(Hungary) Dalma Iványi	6.9
2005–06	(United States) Katie Douglas	20.8	(United States) Rebekkah Brunson	11.3	(France) Caroline Aubert	6.1
2006–07	(United States) Tina Thompson	21.1	(United States) DeLisha Milton-Jones	10.9	(France) Caroline Aubert	6.0
2007–08	(Australia) Lauren Jackson	23.6	(United States) Nicole Ohlde	9.5	(Hungary) Dalma Iványi	5.7
2008–09	(United States) Diana Taurasi	20.5	(United States) Laura Harper	12.0	(Hungary) Dalma Iványi	7.5
2009–10	(United States) Diana Taurasi	24.9	(United States) Candice Dupree	11.0	(Croatia) Anđa Jelavić	6.7
2010–11	(Australia) Penny Taylor	19.2	(United States) Cheryl Ford	14.2	(Hungary) Dalma Iványi	5.4
2011–12	(United States) Diana Taurasi	20.9	(United States) Cheryl Ford	11.9	(United States) Sharnee Zoll-Norman	6.6
2012–13	(United States) Tina Charles	24.0	(United States) Tina Charles	12.5	(Spain) Laia Palau	6.4
2013–14	(United States) Jantel Lavender	20.3	(Croatia) Luca Ivanković	11.1	(Spain) Laia Palau	6.8
2014–15	(United States) Nneka Ogwumike	19.5	(United States) Candace Parker	11.0	(Spain) Laia Palau	7.1
2015–16	(United States) Diana Taurasi	20.9	(United States) Crystal Langhorne	10.8	(Spain) Laia Palau	7.1
2016–17	(United States) Yvonne Turner	18.8	(United States) Nneka Ogwumike	10.2	(Spain) Laia Palau	7.8
2017–18	(United States) Kayla McBride	18.7	(United States) Jantel Lavender	8.6	(Hungary) Courtney Vandersloot	9.0
2018–19	(United States) Breanna Stewart	21.0	(United States) Brionna Jones	10.9	(France) Amel Bouderra	6.9
2019–20	(Ukraine) Alina Iagupova	21.3	(United States) Alyssa Thomas	11.4	(Hungary) Courtney Vandersloot	7.1
2020–21	(Ukraine) Alina Iagupova	20.0	(Brazil) Clarissa Dos Santos	12.3	(Hungary) Courtney Vandersloot	7.6
2021–22	(United States) Kahleah Copper	21.4	(United States) Natasha Howard	11.0	(Turkey) Pelin Bilgiç	6.4
2022–23	(Spain) Megan Gustafson	22.6	(United States) Stephanie Mavunga	12.5	(United States) Erica Wheeler	7.4
2023–24	(Belgium) Emma Meesseman	17.9	(Sweden) Elin Gustavsson	9.2	(United States) Morgan Green	6.7
2024–25	(United States) Brionna Jones	17.9	(United States) Brionna Jones	9.1	(Belgium) Julie Allemand	6.3
2025–26	(Slovenia) Jessica Shepard	17.0	(Slovenia) Jessica Shepard	9.5	(Belgium) Julie Allemand	7.6

== See also ==
=== Men's competitions ===
- EuroLeague
- EuroCup
- EuroLeague SuperCup
- Basketball Champions League
- FIBA Europe Cup
- European North Basketball League

=== Women's competitions ===
- EuroCup Women
- SuperCup Women
- European Women's Basketball League
