= Slovan Orbis Praha BK =

Czech basketball club

Slovan Orbis Praha BK was a basketball club part of the Czech Slovan Orbis Praha multi-sports club.

The men's team won two national championships in 1957 and 1959 and reached the semifinals of the 1960 European Cup, while the women's team won nine national championships between 1954 and 1965 and reached the final of the European Cup in 1961, 1963 and 1966. All three were lost to Daugava Riga and Slavia Sofia.

== Titles ==
- Men
  - Czechoslovak Championship
    - 1957, 1959
- Women
  - Czechoslovak Championship
    - 1954, 1956, 1957, 1959, 1960, 1961, 1962, 1964, 1965
