= WBC Akademik Sofia =

WBC Akademik Sofia is a Bulgarian women's basketball club from Sofia.

== Titles ==
- Bulgarian Leagues (8): 1960, 1966, 1968, 1969, 1970, 1975, 1976, 1982
- Bulgarian Cups (5): 1957, 1960, 1967, 1973, 1975
