= Sporting Athens women's basketball =

Greek basketball team

A.O. Sporting Α.Ο. Σπόρτιγκ
- Leagues: Greek Women's 2nd Division; Greek Women's Cup
- Founded: 1924 (Istanbul); 1936 (Athens)
- History: Sporting Club Istanbul; 1924 – 1936; Sporting Club Athens; 1936 – Present
- Arena: Sporting Sports Arena
- Capacity: 2,500
- Location: Ano Patissia, Athens, Greece
- Team colors: Red and Blue
- President: Vassilis Sakopoulos
- Head coach: Stavros Nanakos
- Championships: Greek Women's Championship: (21); Greek Women's Cup: (3)
- Website: women.sportingbc.gr
Home	Away

The Sporting Athens women's basketball team (Greek: Σπόρτιγκ Αθήνα KAE) is a Greek women's professional basketball team that is located at Ano Patissia, Athens, Greece, at the area of Elia Zervou 89 and Sarantaporou. The club's full name is A.O. Sporting Athens women's basketball.

== History ==
In Greek women’s basketball, Sporting is the most successful team, having won 21 Greek Women's League championships. During the period of 1976-1999, the team won 20 championships. Another championship was won in 2004, which is the last championship of the team. Sporting's women's team has also won three Greek Women's Cups. An important achievement of Sporting's women's section was their participation in the Final Four of EuroLeague Women twice, in the 1990–91 season, and the 1991–92 season. In the last season, Sporting played in the Greek Women’s Second Division.

== Honors ==
- Greek Women's League Championships: (21)
  - 1976, 1977, 1979, 1980, 1981, 1983, 1984, 1985, 1986, 1987, 1988, 1989, 1990, 1991, 1993, 1994, 1995, 1996, 1997, 1999, 2004
- Greek Women's Cups: (3)
  - 1996, 1999, 2005
- EuroLeague Women Final Fours: 2
  - 1991, 1992

== See also ==
- Sporting Athens B.C.
