= ŁKS Łódź (women's basketball) =

ŁKS KK Łódź
- League: I liga
- Founded: 1929; 97 years ago
- Arena: Centrum Sportu UM Łódź
- Location: Łódź, Poland
- Team colors: White, Red, White
- President: Grzegorz Kaczmarek
- Head coach: Piotr Zych
- Championships: 9 Polish Championships
- Website: lkskk.pl

ŁKS KK Łódź is a Polish women's basketball team based in Łódź. With nine Polish Championship titles, it is one of the most accomplished Polish women's basketball teams. It serves as a section of the ŁKS Łódź multi-sport club.

== Honours ==
- Polish Championship:
  - Champions (9): 1967, 1972, 1973, 1974, 1982, 1983, 1986, 1995, 1997
  - Runners-up (10): 1930, 1931, 1966, 1968, 1971, 1975, 1977, 1991, 1996, 1998
  - Third place (11): 1964, 1969, 1976, 1978, 1979, 1980, 1981, 1985, 1987, 1994, 2003
