= Clermont UC =

- Nickname: Les Demoiselles de Clermont
- Founded: 1964; 61 years ago
- Folded: 1985; 40 years ago
- Arena: Maison des Sports
- Location: Clermont-Ferrand, France
- Team colors: White and Black
- President: -
- Head coach: -
- Championships: 13 French Leagues
Home	Away

Clermont-Ferrand Université Club was a French multisports club from Clermont-Ferrand, best known for its women's basketball team.

While the club was founded in 1921 as a rugby club, the basketball section was opened in 1964. It soon became the major powerhouse in the French scene, winning a record twelve national championships in a row between 1968 and 1979.

In 1971 Clermont became the first team from Western Europe to reach the final of the European Cup, losing it to Soviet powerhouse Daugava Riga. Clermont reached four more European Cup finals throughout the 1970s, consolidating itself as one of the best European teams, but it wasn't able to win the competition, losing the 1973, 1974 and 1977 championships to Daugava and the 1976 one to Sparta Prague.

The team declined after winning in 1981 its final national championship, and was disbanded in 1985.

== Titles ==
- 13 French Leagues (1968–1979, 1981)
