= Geas Basket =

Italian basketball club

- Leagues: Serie A1
- Founded: 1955
- Arena: Palacarzaniga
- Capacity: 800
- Location: Sesto San Giovanni, Italy
- Team colors: Yellow, Red and Black
- President: Carlo Vignati
- Head coach: (Italy) Cinzia Zanotti
- Website: http://www.geasbasket.it/
Home	Away

ASD Geas Basket is an Italian women's basketball club from Sesto San Giovanni founded in 1955.

== Team history ==
Geas was the Serie A's leading team in the 1970s, with eight national championships between 1970 and 1978. The rossoneri culminated this golden era winning the 1978 European Cup, becoming the first team from Western Europe to win the trophy.

Most recently, Geas was 3rd in the 2011 Serie A.

== Titles ==
- European Cup
  - 1978
- Serie A
  - 1970, 1971, 1972, 1974, 1975, 1976, 1977, 1978
- Coppa Italia
  - 1973

== Players ==
=== Current roster ===
Note: Flags indicate national team eligibility at FIBA-sanctioned events. Players may hold other non-FIBA nationalities not displayed.

Geas Basket roster
Players
Coaches

Pos.	No.	Nat.	Name	Ht.	Age
C	2	(United States)	Moore, Tinara	1.89 m (6 ft 2 in)	30 – 2 April 1996
PG	3	(United States)	Conti, Gina	1.80 m (5 ft 11 in)	27 – 17 July 1999
PF	9	(Sweden)	Gustavsson, Elin	1.91 m (6 ft 3 in)	33 – 18 January 1993
SF	11	(Poland)	Makurat, Anna	1.83 m (6 ft 0 in)	26 – 31 March 2000
PF	12	(Italy)	Trucco, Valeria	1.91 m (6 ft 3 in)	27 – 1 November 1999
SF	15	(Italy)	Barberis, Maria	1.76 m (5 ft 9 in)	31 – 6 November 1995
SF	24	(Puerto Rico)	Gwathmey, Jazmon	1.88 m (6 ft 2 in)	33 – 24 January 1993
PG	27	(Italy)	Orsili, Alessandra	1.70 m (5 ft 7 in)	25 – 4 October 2001
SF	33	(Italy)	Spreafico, Laura	1.83 m (6 ft 0 in)	35 – 19 June 1991
PG	55	(Italy)	Conte, Anastasia	1.74 m (5 ft 9 in)	26 – 9 February 2000

Head coach

- (Italy) Cinzia Zanotti

Assistant coach(es)

- (Italy) Martina Gargantini
- (Italy) Stefano Vanoncini

Legend

- (C) Team captain
- Injured

- Roster
Updated: 10 November 2024
