= WBC Slavia Sofia =

Slavia Sofia
- Leagues: Bulgarian League
- Founded: 1913; 113 years ago
- Arena: Triaditsa Arena
- Location: Sofia, Bulgaria
- Team colors: White and black
- President: Vasil Yotov
- Head coach: Todor Bogdanov
- Championships: Men: 3 Bulgarian Leagues; 2 Bulgarian Cups; Women: 2 European Cups; 15 Bulgarian Leagues; 11 Bulgarian Cups
Home	Away

WBC Slavia Sofia is a Bulgarian women's basketball section of the Slavia Sofia sport society. Men's basketball team of Slavia Sofia is not active.

Slavia Sofia was an early powerhouse of Bulgarian women's basketball, winning 12 national championships between 1953 and 1965. In 1959 it won the inaugural edition of the European Cup beating Dynamo Moscow, and in 1965 it won its second title, becoming the only team to knock out Daugava Riga in the competition between 1960 and 1975. It also reached the finals in 1960 and 1965. However, since 1965 the team has not won any additional championships. Its major international success in subsequent years was reaching the Ronchetti Cup's semifinals in 1980.

Slavia briefly returned to the national elite in the first half of the 2000s, winning three national championships between 2002 and 2004, and appearing in the new FIBA Eurocup. However, it subsequently declined. As of the end of 2011–2012 season it is last in the national championship, losing quarterfinal playoff series against ex-champion Neftochimik with 2:1.

Slavia has won a record 33 honours: 3 NBL titles and 2 Bulgarian Cups/Men/ & 15 Bulgarian championships, 11 Bulgarian Cups and 2 European Cups/Women/. International titles won by the club are: 2 EuroLeague Women in 1939 & 1963.

== Honours ==
=== Men ===
- National Basketball League
  - Winners (3): 1952, 1953, 1997
- Bulgarian Cup
  - Winners: (2) 1959, 1997

=== Women ===
- European Cups: (2) 1959, 1963
  - Runners-up (2): 1960, 1965
- Bulgarian Leagues (15): 1953, 1954, 1955, 1956, 1957, 1958, 1959, 1961, 1962, 1963, 1964, 1965, 2002, 2003, 2004
  - Runners-up (9): 1945, 1952, 1960, 1966, 1968, 1971, 1992, 1999, 2000
- Bulgarian Cups (11): 1952, 1953, 1955, 1956, 1966, 1970, 1971, 1992, 2000, 2001, 2003
  - Runners-up (5): 1954, 1975,1992, 2000, 2002
