= BLC Sparta Praha =

Women's basketball club from Prague

Sparta Praha
- League: 1.class
- Founded: 1939
- Location: Prague, Czech Republic

Basketball Ladies Club Sparta Praha is a women's basketball club from Prague founded in 1939 as a section of omnisport club Sparta Prague.

Sparta was the most successful team in the Czechoslovak Championship with 23 titles between 1948 and 1987, and in 1976 it defeated Clermont UC in the European Cup's final to become the first Czechoslovak team to win the competition, ending the 12-years winning streak of Daugava Riga, which had defeated Sparta in its previous five appearances in the final. Sparta reached the final for the last time in 1978, losing to Geas Basket. The club declined following the dissolution of Czechoslovakia, and currently plays in the second tier.

== Coaches and final league standings ==
- 1947–1954 : Josef Ezr: 5x champion (1948–1950, 1952–1953), 2nd (1951), 4th (1954)
- 1954–1955 : Miloslav Kříž: 5th (1955)
- 1955–1957 : Jiří Adamíra: 2x 2nd (1956–1957)
- 1957–1964 : Miloslav Kříž: 2 x champion (1958, 1963), 2nd (1964), 3 x 3rd (1959–1961), 6th (1962)
- 1964–1965 : Jiří Baumruk: 4th (1965)
- 1965–1972 : Zbyněk Kubín: 6 x champion (1966–69, 1971–1972), 2nd (1970)
- 1972–1978 : Lubomír Dobrý: 5 x champion (1974–1978), 2nd (1973)
- 1978–1981 : Karel Herink: 3 x champion (1979–1981)
- 1981–1987 : Petr Pajkrt: 2 x champion (1986–1987), 3 x 2nd (1982–1984), 3rd (1985)
- 1987–1990 : Ludvík Rúžička: 2 x 3rd (1988–1989), 5th (1990)
- 1990–1992 : Lubor Blažek: 2nd (1991), 5th (1992)
- 1992–1993 : Milena Jindrová: 12th (1993)

== Titles ==
- European Cup For Women's Champions Clubs
  - 1976
  - runner-up (6) : 1964, 1967, 1968, 1972, 1975, 1978
- Czechoslovak Championship
  - (23) 1948, 1949, 1950, 1952, 1953, 1958, 1963, 1966, 1967, 1968, 1969, 1971, 1972, 1974, 1975, 1976, 1977, 1978, 1979, 1980, 1981, 1986, 1987
- Czechoslovak Cup
  - (6) 1964, 1967, 1968, 1972, 1975, 1978
