= Wisła Kraków (women's basketball) =

Polish women's basketball team, based in Kraków

- League: Basket Liga Kobiet
- Founded: 1906
- Arena: Hala TS Wisła
- Location: Kraków, Poland
- Team colors: White and Red
- President: (Poland) Tomasz Jażdżyński
- Head coach: (Spain) Jorge Aragonés
- Championships: 25 Polish Championships

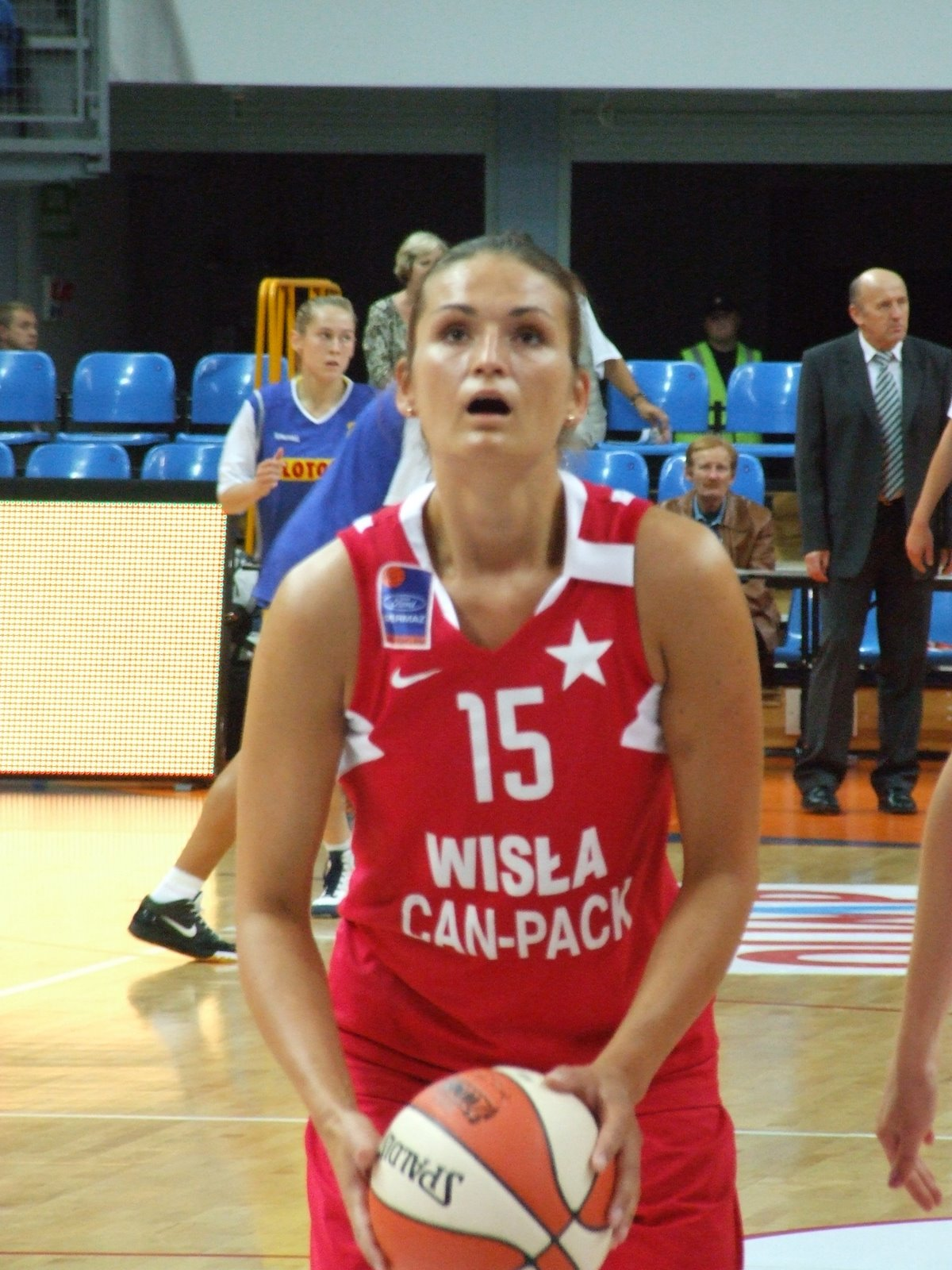
Dorota Gburczyk from Wisła Can-Pack Kraków in 2009.

Wisła Kraków is a Polish professional women's basketball club that was founded in 1906 in the city of Kraków. Wisła plays in the Basket Liga Kobiet, the highest competition in Poland. and have previously played in the EuroLeague Women.

== Titles ==
- EuroLeague Women
  - 2nd place: 1970
  - 4th place in Final Four: 2010
  - 8th place in Final Eight: 2012
- Polish Championship (25): 1963, 1964, 1965, 1966, 1968, 1969, 1970, 1971, 1975, 1976, 1977, 1979, 1980, 1981, 1984, 1985, 1988, 2006, 2007, 2008, 2011, 2012, 2014, 2015, 2016
- 2nd place (12): 1952, 1967, 1972, 1973, 1974, 1983, 1987, 1992, 1999, 2005, 2013, 2017
- 3rd place (9): 1951, 1959, 1960, 1961, 1962, 1982, 1998, 2000, 2009
- Polish Cup (13): 1959, 1960, 1961, 1966, 1967, 1979, 1984, 2006, 2009, 2012, 2014, 2015, 2017
- Polish Super Cup (2): 2008, 2009
- PZKosz Cup (1): 1984

== Notable former players ==
European Players

Poland

- Ewelina Kobryn, (8 seasons: '01-'04, '07-'12)
- Anna Wielebnowska, (10 seasons: '96-'02, '06-'10)

Hungary

- Allie Quigley

Latvia

- Zane Tamane, (1 season: '13-'14)

Lithuania

- Gintare Petronyte

Montenegro

- Jelena Škerović, (5 season: '04-'09)

Spain

- Marta Fernández

Serbia Montenegro

- Milka Bjelica, (1 season: '11-'12)

Sweden

- Farhiya Abdi

Non-European Players

Australia

- Erin Phillips, (3 seasons: '10-'12, '13-'14)

United States

- Alana Beard, (1 season: '12-'13)
- Tina Charles, (1 season: '12-'13)
- Katie Douglas, (1 season: '12-'13)
- Candice Dupree, (1 season: '07-'08)
- Chamique Holdsclaw, (2 seasons: '06-'07, '08-'09)
- Jantel Lavender
- Taj McWilliams-Franklin, (1 season: '11-'12)
- Nicole Powell, (2 seasons: '10-'12)
- Courtney Vandersloot

== See also ==
- Wisła Kraków - men's football team
