= TTT Riga =

Latvian women's basketball club

- Leagues: LSBL; EWBL; EuroCup Women
- Founded: 1958
- Arena: Arena Riga (capacity: 12,500)
- Location: Riga, Latvia
- Team colors: White and Orange
- Head coach: Mārtiņš Zībarts
- Championships: 23 LSBL Championship: 1992, 1993, 1995, 2001-2005, 2007, 2008, 2010, 2011, 2014-2023; 18 EuroLeague Women: 1960–1962, 1964–75, 1977, 1981, 1982; 1 Ronchetti Cup: 1987; 2 EWBL: 2016, 2019
- Website: tttriga.lv
Home	Away

TTT Rīga is a professional women's basketball club based in Riga, Latvia. The abbreviation "TTT" stands for 'Tram and Trolley Trust'. The team held its first official game on 5 November 1958. The next 25 years are known as the First Golden Age of the club. Internationally, the club was also known as Daugava Riga, because Daugava was the predecessor of TTT Riga in the 1950s.

== History ==
The founding of the TTT women's team can be traced back to 14 August 1958, when a sports hall was unveiled on the second floor of a paintshop at the Tram and Trolley Trust (Latvian: Tramvaju un trolejbusu trests) - a public transport company in Soviet-occupied Latvia - at their depot at Klijānu iela (Klijānu St.). The Daugava Sports Hall women's basketball team, that had already been established around this time, then became managed by the trust.

Led by famous Latvian basketball player and coach Oļģerts Altbergs, TTT Riga conquered its first European title in 1960, winning the European Cup for Women's Champion Clubs (since 1992 known as EuroLeague Women). Dzidra Uztupe-Karamiševa, Skaidrīte Smildziņa-Budovska, Vita Siliņa-Lūka (Karpova), Dzintra Ķiepe-Baka and other outstanding players of the time brought women's basketball to new levels. Seventeen more European titles were added during next 22 years – achievement unequalled until this day.

The rise of Uļjana Semjonova, who joined TTT Riga in 1965, at the age of 13, confirmed the golden status of TTT. From 1964 to 1975, TTT earned 12 consecutive European titles. In 18 seasons of international competition Uļjana Semjonova never lost a game in national team competition.

The late 1980s and 1990s marked a decline of the once famous club, although TTT won a Ronchetti Cup in 1987. The best Latvian players, with Semjonova being the first one, continued their professional careers in France, Spain and Italy. It took ten years after Latvia regained independence, while TTT re-entered the Liliana Ronchetti Cup in 2001. Their entry followed only five years later.

The autumn of 2006 was a turning point in history of the club. New leadership and new management launched a long term project to unite the best Latvian players under the famous club name, first foreign internationals – like Brazilian and WNBA star Iziane Castro Marques – came to Latvia. In the spring of 2007, TTT Riga after one year silence regained the Latvian title and applied for the participation in FIBA EuroLeague Women. The 2007–2008 season was the 50th for the club.

On 27 November 2019, TTT Riga defeated defending EuroLeague champions UMMC Ekaterinburg, with Marina Mabrey recording 24 points and 8 rebounds.

== Players of note ==
=== Naismith Memorial Basketball Hall of Famers ===
- Uļjana Semjonova, C, 1982–1983, Inducted 1993

=== Current roster ===
TTT Riga roster
Players
Coaches

Pos.	No.	Nat.	Name	Ht.	Wt.	Age
G	1	(Latvia)	Elizabete Bulāne	1.70 m (5 ft 7 in)		23 – 1 January 2003
G	3	(Sweden)	Binta Drammeh	1.81 m (5 ft 11 in)		34 – 21 May 1992
F	4	(Latvia)	Paula Strautmane	1.86 m (6 ft 1 in)		29 – 23 March 1997
F	5	(United States)	Megan Huff	1.90 m (6 ft 3 in)		30 – 17 April 1996
F	10	(Latvia)	Karlīne Pilābere	1.87 m (6 ft 2 in)		35 – 16 November 1990
F	11	(Latvia)	Paula Mauriņa	1.84 m (6 ft 0 in)		24 – 18 January 2002
G	12	(Latvia)	Vanesa Jasa	1.78 m (5 ft 10 in)		23 – 9 July 2003
C	13	(Latvia)	Aija Klakocka	1.90 m (6 ft 3 in)		39 – 17 October 1986
F	14	(Latvia)	Eva Indriķe	1.80 m (5 ft 11 in)		25 – 5 July 2001
F	17	(Latvia)	Anita Miķelsone	1.78 m (5 ft 10 in)		24 – 13 December 2001
C	22	(Latvia)	Zenta Meļņika	1.97 m (6 ft 6 in)		35 – 6 September 1991
G	23	(United States)	Linnae Harper	1.75 m (5 ft 9 in)		31 – 31 January 1995
F	33	(Latvia)	Kitija Laksa	1.86 m (6 ft 1 in)		30 – 21 May 1996
F	35	(Latvia)	Kate Krēsliņa	1.84 m (6 ft 0 in)		30 – 14 April 1996

Head coach

- (Latvia) Mārtiņš Zībarts

Assistant coach(es)

- (Latvia) Matīss Rožlapa

Legend

- (C) Team captain
- Injured

- Roster
Updated: October 21, 2018

== Notable past players ==
- Elīna Dikaioulaku
- Liene Priede
- Uļjana Semjonova
- Ieva Tāre
- Iciss Tillis
- Marina Mabrey
- Kristīne Vītola

== Championships ==
- FIBA's EuroLeague Women: 18 (1960–1962, 1964–75, 1977, 1981, 1982)
- FIBA's Ronchetti Cup: 1 (1987)
- Eastern European Women's Basketball League: 2 (2016, 2019)
- USSR Championships: 21
- Latvian Championships: 14 (1992, 1993, 1995, 2001-2005, 2007, 2008, 2010, 2011, 2014, 2015)
