= EuroLeague Women 2007–08 Knockout Stage =

EuroLeague Women 2007–08 Knockout Stage are the main rounds of EuroLeague Women 2007-08, included Eighth-Finals and Quarter-Finals.

== Elimination rounds ==
=== Eighth-Finals ===
| Team #1 | Agg. | Team #2 | 1st leg | 2nd leg | 3rd leg^{*} |
|---|---|---|---|---|---|
| CSKA Moscow (Russia) | 2 - 0 | (Spain) Halcon Avenida | 83 - 64 | 78 - 70 | |
| UMMC Ekaterinburg (Russia) | 2 - 0 | (France) ESB Lille Metropole | 96 - 50 | 71 - 64 | |
| Fenerbahçe (Turkey) | 2 - 0 | (Poland) Wisła Can-Pack Kraków | 78 - 61 | 67 - 59 | |
| Bourges Basket (France) | 2 - 0 | (Hungary) MKB Euroleasing Sopron | 69 - 47 | 68 - 48 | |
| Spartak Moscow Region (Russia) | 2 - 0 | (Lithuania) TEO Vilnius | 93 - 67 | 83 - 71 | |
| Ros Casares Valencia (Spain) | 2 - 1 | (France) US Valenciennes Olympic | 70 - 44 | 63 - 71 | 70 - 46 |
| Gambrinus SIKA Brno (Czech Republic) | 2 - 1 | (Hungary) MiZo Pécs 2010 | 71 - 67 | 55 - 58 | 84 - 45 |
| Dynamo Moscow (Russia) | 2 - 0 | (Poland) Lotos PKO BP Gdynia | 86 - 75 | 79 - 74 (OT) | |

==== First leg ====
February 5, 2008

February 5
19:30

Report

| CSKA Moscow (Russia) | 83–64 | (Spain) Halcon Avenida |
Scoring by quarter: 22-12, 22-20, 19-18, 20-14

Moscow
Attendance: 2500

February 5
19:00

Report

| UMMC Ekaterinburg (Russia) | 96–50 | (France) ESB Lille Metropole |
Scoring by quarter: 20-16, 15-7, 23-13, 38-14

Ekaterinburg
Attendance: 4500

February 5
20:15

Report

| Fenerbahçe (Turkey) | 78–61 | (Poland) Wisła Can-Pack Kraków |
Scoring by quarter: 27-17, 28-20, 7-12, 16-12

Istanbul
Attendance: 500

February 5
20:00

Report

| Bourges Basket (France) | 69–47 | (Hungary) MKB Euroleasing Sopron |
Scoring by quarter: 12-15, 21-7, 21-8, 15-17

Bourges
Attendance: 3000

February 5
17:00

Report

| Spartak Moscow Region (Russia) | 93–67 | (Lithuania) TEO Vilnius |
Scoring by quarter: 19-11, 28-12, 25-31, 21-13

Vidnoye
Attendance: 2700

February 5
20:30

Report

| Ros Casares Valencia (Spain) | 70–44 | (France) US Valenciennes Olympic |
Scoring by quarter: 19-10, 19-15, 14-8, 18-11

Valencia
Attendance: 1200

February 5
18:00

Report

| Gambrinus SIKA Brno (Czech Republic) | 71–67 | (Hungary) MiZo Pécs 2010 |
Scoring by quarter: 20-15, 7-14, 21-18, 23-20

Brno
Attendance: 1600

February 5
18:00

Report

| Dynamo Moscow (Russia) | 86–75 | (Poland) Lotos PKO BP Gdynia |
Scoring by quarter: 21-26, 18-20, 21-15, 26-14

Moscow
Attendance: 1500

==== Second leg ====
February 8, 2008

February 8
20:30

Report

| Halcon Avenida (Spain) | 70–78 | (Russia) CSKA Moscow |
Scoring by quarter: 20-15, 23-22, 15-18, 12-23

Salamanca
Attendance: 3500

February 8
20:00

Report

| ESB Lille Metropole (France) | 64–71 | (Russia) UMMC Ekaterinburg |
Scoring by quarter: 21-20, 14-17, 17-17, 12-17

Villeneuve d'Ascq
Attendance: 1800

February 8
17:45

Report

| Wisła Can-Pack Kraków (Poland) | 59–67 | (Turkey) Fenerbahçe |
Scoring by quarter: 14-16, 20-17, 11-9, 14-25

Kraków
Attendance: 1800

February 8
18:00

Report

| MKB Euroleasing Sopron (Hungary) | 48–68 | (France) Bourges Basket |
Scoring by quarter: 17-18, 7-9, 13-20, 11-21

Sopron
Attendance: 1200

February 8
18:00

Report

| TEO Vilnius (Lithuania) | 71–83 | (Russia) Spartak Moscow Region |
Scoring by quarter: 11-20, 18-27, 20-23, 22-13

Vilnius
Attendance: 500

February 8
20:30

Report

| US Valenciennes Olympic (France) | 71–63 | (Spain) Ros Casares Valencia |
Scoring by quarter: 14-9, 25-21, 9-17, 23-16

Valenciennes
Attendance: 2700

February 8
18:00

Report

| MiZo Pécs 2010 (Hungary) | 58–55 | (Czech Republic) Gambrinus SIKA Brno |
Scoring by quarter: 19-10, 15-17, 11-16, 13-12

Pécs
Attendance: 3500

February 8
17:00

Report

| Lotos PKO BP Gdynia (Poland) | 74–79; OT (OT) | (Russia) Dynamo Moscow |
Scoring by quarter: 16-15, 15-15, 18-9, 11-21, Overtime: 14-19

Gdynia
Attendance: 1700

==== Third leg ====
February 13, 2008

February 13
20:30

Report

| Ros Casares Valencia (Spain) | 70–46 | (France) US Valenciennes Olympic |
Scoring by quarter: 21-6, 17-17, 12-10, 20-13

Valencia
Attendance: 1800

February 13
18:00

Report

| Gambrinus SIKA Brno (Czech Republic) | 84–45 | (Hungary) MiZo Pécs 2010 |
Scoring by quarter: 22-13, 19-9, 31-3, 12-20

Brno
Attendance: 2000

=== Quarter-finals ===
| Team #1 | Agg. | Team #2 | 1st leg | 2nd leg | 3rd leg^{*} |
|---|---|---|---|---|---|
| CSKA Moscow (Russia) | 0 - 2 | (Russia) UMMC Ekaterinburg | 74 - 81 | 90 - 94 | |
| Bourges Basket (France) | 2 - 0 | (Turkey) Fenerbahçe | 85 - 69 | 74 - 72 | |
| Spartak Moscow Region (Russia) | 2 - 0 | (Russia) Dynamo Moscow | 96 - 67 | 98 - 58 | |
| Ros Casares Valencia (Spain) | 1 - 2 | (Czech Republic) Gambrinus SIKA Brno | 71 - 63 | 55 - 65 | 69 - 75 |

==== First leg ====
February 26, 2008

February 26
19:30

Report

| CSKA Moscow (Russia) | 74–81 | (Russia) UMMC Ekaterinburg |
Scoring by quarter: 23-22, 21-21, 16-16, 14-22

Moscow
Attendance: 4550

February 26
20:30

Report

| Bourges Basket (France) | 85–69 | (Turkey) Fenerbahçe |
Scoring by quarter: 25- 15, 19-19, 20-20, 21-15

Bourges
Attendance: 3000

February 26
17:00

Report

| Spartak Moscow Region (Russia) | 96–67 | (Russia) Dynamo Moscow |
Scoring by quarter: 24-19, 27-14, 31-18, 14-16

Vidnoye
Attendance: 2500

February 26
20:30

Report

| Ros Casares Valencia (Spain) | 71–63 | (Czech Republic) Gambrinus SIKA Brno |
Scoring by quarter: 18-16, 16-16, 20-19, 17-12

Valencia
Attendance: 2800

==== Second leg ====
February 29, 2008

February 29
19:00

Report

| UMMC Ekaterinburg (Russia) | 94–90 | (Russia) CSKA Moscow |
Scoring by quarter: 24-19, 21-20, 20-22, 29-29

Ekaterinburg
Attendance: 7000

February 29
20:15

Report

| Fenerbahçe (Turkey) | 72–74 | (France) Bourges Basket |
Scoring by quarter: 16-19, 15-15, 14-18, 27-22

Istanbul
Attendance: 550

February 29
18:00

Report

| Dynamo Moscow (Russia) | 58–98 | (Russia) Spartak Moscow Region |
Scoring by quarter: 14-25, 24-25, 10-23, 10-25

Moscow
Attendance: 1000

February 29
18:00

Report

| Gambrinus SIKA Brno (Czech Republic) | 65–55 | (Spain) Ros Casares Valencia |
Scoring by quarter: 12-15, 21-10, 19-11, 13-19

Brno
Attendance: 2100

==== Third leg ====
March 5, 2008

March 5
20:30

Report

| Ros Casares Valencia (Spain) | 69–75 | (Czech Republic) Gambrinus SIKA Brno |
Scoring by quarter: 14-21, 13-19, 21-16, 21-19

Valencia
Attendance: 2800
