= 2010–11 EuroLeague Women =

- League: EuroLeague Women
- Sport: Basketball

Regular Season

Final
- Champions: (Spain) Halcón Avenida Salamanca
- Runners-up: (Russia) Spartak Moscow Region

EuroLeague Women seasons
- ← 2009–10 2011–12 →

The 2010–11 season is the 15th edition of Europe's premier basketball tournament for women - EuroLeague Women since it was rebranded to its current format

== Regular season ==
=== Group A ===
	Team	Pld	W	L	PF	PA	Diff	Pts
1.	(Italy) Cras Basket Taranto	10	8	2	658	571	+87	18
2.	(Poland) Wisła Can-Pack Kraków	10	7	3	691	620	+71	17
3.	(Slovakia) Good Angels Košice	10	5	5	699	641	+58	15
4.	(Hungary) Pécs 2010	10	5	5	618	651	−33	15
5.	(France) USO Mondeville	10	4	6	637	663	−26	14
6.	(Latvia) TTT Riga	10	1	9	548	705	−157	11

=== Group B ===
	Team	Pld	W	L	PF	PA	Diff	Pts
1.	(Turkey) Fenerbahçe S.K.	10	10	0	891	754	+137	20
2.	(Russia) UMMC Ekaterinburg	10	8	2	783	664	+119	18
3.	(Spain) Rivas Ecópolis	10	5	5	738	768	−30	15
4.	(Hungary) MKB Euroleasing Sopron	10	4	6	768	771	−3	14
5.	Gospić Croatia Osiguranje	10	2	8	787	889	−102	12
6.	(Poland) Lotos Gdynia	10	1	9	728	849	−121	11

=== Group C ===
	Team	Pld	W	L	PF	PA	Diff	Pts
1.	(Spain) Halcon Avenida Salamanca	10	8	2	777	645	+132	18
2.	(Russia) Spartak Moscow Region	10	6	4	771	636	+135	16
3.	(Czech Republic) ZVVZ USK Praha	10	5	5	735	724	+11	15
4.	(Turkey) Galatasaray Istanbul	10	4	6	694	754	−60	14
5.	(Lithuania) Vici Aistes Kaunas	10	4	6	680	788	−108	14
6.	(France) Tarbes Gespe Bigorre	10	3	7	646	756	−110	13

=== Group D ===
	Team	Pld	W	L	PF	PA	Diff	Pts
1.	(Spain) Ros Casares Valencia	10	8	2	754	606	+148	18
2.	(France) Bourges Basket	10	7	3	676	631	+45	17
3.	(Italy) Beretta Famila Schio	10	6	4	683	648	+35	16
4.	(Russia) Nadezhda Orenburg	10	5	5	713	666	+47	15
5.	(Poland) AZS PWSZ Gorzów Wielkopolski	10	2	8	607	736	−129	12
6.	(Czech Republic) Frisco SIKA Brno	10	2	8	609	755	−146	12

== Knockout stage ==
=== Eightfinals ===
Game 1 was played 1 February 2011. Game 2 was played 4 February 2011. Game 3 will be played 9 February 2011. The team that wins two games first, advances to the quarterfinals.

Team #1	Agg.	Team #2	1st leg	2nd leg	3rd leg^{*}
Fenerbahçe S.K. (Turkey)	2 – 0	(Turkey) Galatasaray Istanbul	77 – 58	73 – 51	
Spartak Moscow Region (Russia)	2 – 1	(Italy) Beretta Famila Schio	65 – 60	64 – 66	69 – 63
UMMC Ekaterinburg (Russia)	2 – 0	(Spain) Rivas Ecópolis	63 – 58	83 – 74	
Cras Basket Taranto (Italy)	2 – 1	(Czech Republic) ZVVZ USK Praha	56 – 73	75 – 73	83 – 49
Ros Casares Valencia (Spain)	2 – 1	(Hungary) MKB Euroleasing Sopron	84 – 56	70 – 72	86 – 63
Bourges Basket (France)	2 – 1	(Slovakia) Good Angels Košice	76 – 68	54 – 61	79 – 68
Halcon Avenida Salamanca (Spain)	2 – 0	(Hungary) Pécs 2010	76 – 60	73 – 66	
Wisła Can-Pack Kraków (Poland)	2 – 0	(Russia) Nadezhda Orenburg	75 – 70	72 – 63	

=== Quarterfinals ===
Game 1 was played 22 February 2011. Game 2 was played 25 February 2011. Game 3 would have been played on 2 March 2011. The team that won two games first, advanced to the Final four.

Team #1	Agg.	Team #2	1st leg	2nd leg	3rd leg^{*}
Fenerbahçe S.K. (Turkey)	0 – 2	(Russia) Spartak Moscow Region	78 – 86	56 – 74	
UMMC Ekaterinburg (Russia)	2 – 0	(Italy) Cras Basket Taranto	68 – 51	74 – 32	
Ros Casares Valencia (Spain)	2 – 0	(France) Bourges Basket	65 – 58	63 – 58	
Halcon Avenida Salamanca (Spain)	2 – 0	(Poland) Wisła Can-Pack Kraków	87 – 70	72 – 60	

== Final four ==
The venue was decided on March 8, 2011. Ultimately, Yekaterinburg won the bidding and will host the event at the Uralochka Sports Palace.

Semi-finals
8 April
(Russia) Spartak Moscow Region	54
(Russia) UMMC Ekaterinburg	43
8 April
(Spain) Ros Casares Valencia	49
(Spain) Halcon Avenida Salamanca	61

Final
10 April
(Russia) Spartak Moscow Region	59
(Spain) Halcon Avenida Salamanca	68
Third place
10 April
(Russia) UMMC Ekaterinburg	64
(Spain) Ros Casares Valencia	52

All times are local (UTC+6).

=== Semifinals ===
8 April 2011
19:00

Report

Spartak Moscow Region (Russia)	54–43	(Russia) UMMC Ekaterinburg
Scoring by quarter: 15–14, 7–13, 15–5, 17–11
Pts: Prince 13; Rebs: McWilliams 10; Asts: Bird, Quinn 3		Pts: Parker 11; Rebs: Parker, Stepanova 9 Asts: Dumerc 3

Uralochka Sports Palace, Yekaterinburg
Attendance: 5,500
Referees: Giansanti (ITA), Brziak (SVK), Krause (GER)

8 April 2011
21:15

Report

Ros Casares Valencia (Spain)	49–61	(Spain) Halcón Avenida Salamanca
Scoring by quarter: 15–14, 14–14, 10–18, 10–15
Pts: Douglas, Brunson 15; Rebs: Douglas 9 Asts: Douglas, Palau 3		Pts: Lyttle 17; Rebs: Lyttle, de Souza 11; Asts: three players 3

Uralochka Sports Palace, Yekaterinburg
Attendance: 3,000
Referees: Herceg (CRO), Glisic (SRB), Baumanis (LAT)

=== Third place game ===
10 April 2011
16:45

Report

UMMC Ekaterinburg (Russia)	64–52	(Spain) Ros Casares Valencia
Scoring by quarter: 12–12, 12–15, 18–14, 22–11
Pts: Gruda 14; Rebs: Gruda, Parker 9 Asts: Pondexter 6		Pts: Brunson 12; Rebs: three players 6 Asts: Edwige Lawson 3

Uralochka Sports Palace, Yekaterinburg
Attendance: 5,500
Referees: Brziak (SVK), Baumanis (LAT), Nitu (ROU)

=== Final ===
10 April 2011
19:00

Report

Spartak Moscow Region (Russia)	59–68	(Spain) Halcón Avenida Salamanca
Scoring by quarter: 8–14, 14–16, 16–20, 21–18
Pts: McWilliams 17; Rebs: McWilliams 11; Asts: Milovanović 3		Pts: Domínguez 16; Rebs: Lyttle 13; Asts: three players 2

Uralochka Sports Palace, Yekaterinburg
Attendance: 3,800
Referees: Herceg (CRO), Krause (GER), Glisic (SRB)

Euroleague Women 2011 Champions

Halcón Avenida Salamanca
First title
