= Ros Casares Godella =

Spanish basketball team

- Leagues: 1ª Autonomica
- Founded: 1996
- Dissolved: 2014
- History: Popular Bàsquet Godella; Until 1996–99; Ros Casares Valencia; 1999–2013; Ros Casares Godella; 2013–2014
- Arena: Pabellón Municipal
- Location: Godella, Spain
- Team colors: Blue and orange
- Championships: 3 EuroLeague; 14 Liga Femenina; 11 Copa de la Reina; 6 Supercopa de España
- Website: roscasaresbasket.com
Home	Away

Ros Casares Godella was a professional women's basketball team based in Godella, Spain. It played in the Liga Femenina de Baloncesto between 1996 and 2012, when it resigned to play in EuroLeague and Spanish League. It continued playing in Primera División Femenina, third tier of Spanish women's basketball, until 2014 when the club was integrated in Valencia Basket as its women's section.

== History ==
The club was founded in 1996 as Popular Bàsquet Godella. In 1998, the construction company Ros Casares acquired the team and in 2001 the club won its first league with this denomination.

The following season defended the title, won its first national cup and made its debut in the EuroLeague. In subsequent years the team became a regular in the EuroLeague and fought tightly with UB Barcelona, which disappeared in 2007. That season marked the beginning of Ros Casares' golden era, with four national doubles in a row and two EuroLeague finals lost to Spartak Moscow Region.

Following an unsuccessful 2010–11 season where Ros Casares lost the national titles to Perfumerías Avenida and Rivas Ecópolis the team was greatly strengthened and it won the 2012 EuroLeague by beating UMMC Ekaterinburg, Spartak Moscow Region, Wisła Kraków and finally Rivas Ecópolis in the new Final Eight, in addition to its eighth national championship. However, the club announced it would be disbanded just two months later, but finally continued playing in lower divisions.

In May 2014, Ros Casares agreed all the teams of the club will be integrated in Valencia Basket since the 2014–15 season.

=== Club names ===
- PB Godella
- Ros Casares Godella
- Ros Casares Valencia
- Ciudad Ros Casares Valencia
- Ros Casares Godella

== Season by season ==
Season	Tier	Division	Pos.	Copa de la Reina	European competitions	
1997–98	1	Liga Femenina	8th			
1998–99	1	Liga Femenina	6th			
1999–00	1	Liga Femenina	4th	Semifinalist		
2000–01	1	Liga Femenina	1st	Quarterfinalist	2 Ronchetti Cup	R64
2001–02	1	Liga Femenina	1st	Champion	1 EuroLeague	GS
2002–03	1	Liga Femenina	2nd	Champion	1 EuroLeague	QF
2003–04	1	Liga Femenina	1st	Champion	1 EuroLeague	GS
2004–05	1	Liga Femenina	2nd	Semifinalist	1 EuroLeague	QF
2005–06	1	Liga Femenina	4th	Runner-up	1 EuroLeague	R16
2006–07	1	Liga Femenina	1st	Champion	1 EuroLeague	RU
2007–08	1	Liga Femenina	1st	Champion	1 EuroLeague	QF
2008–09	1	Liga Femenina	1st	Champion	1 EuroLeague	QF
2009–10	1	Liga Femenina	1st	Champion	1 EuroLeague	RU
2010–11	1	Liga Femenina	2nd	Runner-up	1 EuroLeague	4th
2011–12	1	Liga Femenina	1st (Note: Resigned to its place in the league.)	Runner-up	1 EuroLeague	C
2012–13	3	1ª Autonomica	5th			
2013–14	3	1ª Autonomica	3rd			

== FIBA competition record ==
Competition	Stage	Result	Opponent	Position	Top scorer
2000–01 Ronchetti Cup	Round of 64	83–70 63–77	(Italy) La Spezia		Anula 22 + 25
2001–02 EuroLeague	1st Stage	71–76 71–64; 51–69 62–67; 72–64 74–68; 74–87 70–65; 71–75 58–48; 51–69 78–64; 69–72 73–81	(Hungary) Sopron (France) Valenciennes (Czech Republic) Brno (Turkey) Fenerbahçe (Lithuania) Vilnius (Italy) Parma (Poland) Gdynia	5 / 8	Valdemoro 17 + Johnson 17; Johnson 11 + 19; Johnson 24 + 18; Johnson 20 + Fernández 17; Fernández 21 + 12; Fallon 10 + Valdemoro 21; Page 17 + Johnson 23
2002–03 EuroLeague	1st Stage	55–74 65–47; 54–64 62–50; 77–56 67–75; 68–79 66–56; 73–61 56–61; 75–61 72–53; 75–82 54–52	(Italy) Schio (Slovakia) Ruzomberok (Hungary) Sopron (Lithuania) Vilnius (Poland) Gdynia (Italy) Parma (France) Bourges	4 / 8	Fallon 19 + Valdemoro 21; Valdemoro 14 + Fallon 15; Valdemoro 18 + 24; Aguilar 13 + Fallon 18; Farris, Fernández, Riley 17 + Fernández 16; Valdemoro 22 + Aguilar 16; Valdemoro 29 + ?
	Quarterfinals	66–71 48–56	(France) Valenciennes		? + Valdemoro 16
2003–04 EuroLeague	1st Stage	61–72 67–58; 58–54 48–67; 83–89 71–69; 71–67 85–53; 79–58 56–79; 69–58 60–61; 63–70 62–68	(Czech Republic) Brno (Russia) Samara (Poland) Gdynia (Italy) Parma (Hungary) Pécs (Lithuania) Vilnius (France) Valenciennes	5 / 8	Valdemoro 18 + Fallon 17; Valdemoro 20 + 16; Valdemoro 22 + Fallon 16; Aguilar 14 + Fallon 17; Fernández 24 + Valdemoro 22; Aguilar 17 + Van Gorp, Valdemoro 16; Fallon 16 + Valdemoro 16
2004–05 EuroLeague	1st Stage	67–81 85–76; 63–57 98–58; 62–66 72–68; 90–57 89–48; 64–68 64–66; 99–58 103–68	(Russia) Dynamo Moscow (Slovakia) Kosice (France) Bourges (Greece) Sporting Athens (Hungary) Pécs (Czech Republic) Kara Trutnov	4 / 7	Batkovic 21 + Holdsclaw 20; Valdemoro 20 + Batkovic, Valdemoro 20; Holdsclaw 16 + 30; Holdsclaw 22 + Valdemoro 18; Holdsclaw 23 + Valdemoro 28; Valdemoro 30 + 32
	Round of 16	65–59 73–70	(France) Valenciennes		Holdsclaw 20 + Valdemoro 20
	Quarterfinals	51–62 45–75	(Russia) Samara		Holdsclaw 19 + Batkovic 12
2005–06 EuroLeague	1st Stage	64–77 61–83; 67–81 76–73; 80–78 71–60; 77–62 74–70; 46–81 58–59	(Hungary) Pécs (France) Mondeville (Czech Republic) USK Prague (Belgium) Namur (Russia) Samara	3 / 6	Antibe 17 + Aguilar 16; Santos 16 + 21; Antibe 20 + Montañana 26; Antibe 21 + Kneževic 19; Aguilar 15 + 16
	Round of 16	59–72 43–64	(Russia) Dynamo Moscow		Aguilar 12 + Antibe 10
2006–07 EuroLeague	1st Stage	81–58 76–69; 63–69 73–59; 79–63 73–81; 83–71 76–50; 66–71 68–71	(France) Valenciennes (Czech Republic) Brno (Russia) Ekaterinburg (Poland) Gdynia (Turkey) Fenerbahçe	2 / 6	Milton-Jones 25 + 26; Tornikidou 24 + Milton-Jones 25; Milton-Jones 21 + 19; Aguilar 16 + Milton-Jones 24; Dydek 19 + Milton-Jones 22
	Round of 16	80–72 67–57	(Poland) Wisla Krakow		Milton-Jones 19 + 17
	Quarterfinals	67–69 71–53 82–80	(Turkey) Fenerbahçe		Milton-Jones 19 + 20 + 30
	Semifinals	73–59	(France) Bourges		Milton-Jones 20
	Final	62–79	(Russia) Spartak Moscow Region		Milton-Jones 21
2007–08 EuroLeague	1st Stage	71–52 94–54; 77–71 83–78; 82–71 55–53; 75–70 84–72; 80–75 89–60	(Italy) Atletico Faenza (France) Mondeville (Russia) Dynamo Moscow (Lithuania) Vilnius (Hungary) Pécs	1 / 6	Douglas 28 + Milton-Jones 18; Maltsi 14 + Milton-Jones 20; Milton-Jones 19 + Douglas, Milton-Jones 15; Douglas 16 + Milton-Jones 19; Douglas 21 + Milton-Jones 20
	Round of 16	70–44 63–71 70–46	(France) Valenciennes		Milton-Jones 12 + Douglas 21 + 17
	Quarterfinals	71–63 55–65 69–75	(Czech Republic) Brno		Milton-Jones 26 + Douglas 22 + Milton-Jones, Tornikidou 16
2008–09 EuroLeague	1st Stage	93–51 85–59; 72–87 69–88; 81–89 71–63; 99–51 91–61; 83–72 89–72	(Poland) Gdynia (Czech Republic) USK Prague (Russia) Ekaterinburg (France) Union Hainaut (Croatia) Sibenik	2 / 6	De Souza 21 + Milton-Jones 19; Milton-Jones 18 + 19; Valdemoro 22 + Milton-Jones 19; Milton-Jones 25 + Valdemoro 19; Valdemoro 24 + Milton-Jones 20
	Round of 16	98–53 81–48	(Slovakia) Kosice		Wiggins 23 + De Souza, Valdemoro 16
	Quarterfinals	57–65 73–71 70–79	(Russia) Spartak Moscow Region		Valdemoro 20 + 21 + Milton-Jones 18
2009–10 EuroLeague	1st Stage	118–38 78–54; 78–48 75–50; 87–68 60–72; 69–78 87–59; 63–62 77–47	(Latvia) Riga (Lithuania) Vilnius (Russia) Ekaterinburg (Italy) CRAS Taranto (Turkey) Galatasaray	2 / 6	Milton-Jones 25 + Hammon 18; Milton-Jones 23 + Valdemoro 15; Milton-Jones, Palau 19 + Aguilar, Milton-Jones 12; Milton-Jones 18 + Valdemoro 20; Milton-Jones 17 + Valdemoro 21
	Round of 16	81–70 85–74	(Czech Republic) USK Prague		De Souza 24 + Milton-Jones 18
	Quarterfinals	74–50 63–57	(Spain) Salamanca		Snell 21 + De Souza 21
	Semifinals	86–57	(Poland) Wisla Krakow		De Souza 23
	Semifinals	80–87	(Russia) Spartak Moscow Region		Milton-Jones 19
2010–11 EuroLeague	1st Stage	76–68 82–87; 74–47 55–58; 76–67 65–51; 60–53 86–52; 82–74 98–49	(Russia) Nadezhda Orenburg (France) Bourges (Italy) Schio (Poland) Gorzów (Czech Republic) Brno	1 / 6	Douglas 17 + 24; Brunson 19 + Brunson, Lawson 15; Brunson, Fernández 20 + Douglas 18; Brunson, Douglas 16 + Brunson 16; Brunson 27 + Douglas 35
	Round of 16	84–56 70–72 86–63	(Hungary) Sopron		Brunson, Lawson 16 + Brunson 23 + Douglas 25
	Quarterfinals	65–58 63–58	(France) Bourges		Douglas 27 + 24
	Semifinals	49–61	(Spain) Salamanca		Brunson, Douglas 15
	Third place	52–64	(Russia) Ekaterinburg		Brunson 12
2011–12 EuroLeague	1st Stage	80–63 80–43; 83–55 72–73; 90–72 84–70; 59–67 81–70; 77–50 68–61; 60–52 81–63; 76–46 98–80	(Hungary) Győr (Lithuania) Kaunas (Poland) Gdynia (Czech Republic) USK Prague (France) Bourges (Russia) Ekaterinburg (Turkey) Galatasaray	1 / 8	Murphy 26 + Wauters 18; Wauters 24 + 18; Yacoubou 23 + Wauters 21; Lyttle 19 + Yacoubou 14; Murphy 17 + Jackson 14; Wauters 17 + Yacoubou 16; Lyttle, Palau 20 + Moore 26
	Round of 16	88–54 78–58	(Poland) Polkowice		Wauters 19 + Moore 20
	Final Eight	62–49; 77–66; 90–61	(Russia) Ekaterinburg (Russia) Spartak Moscow Region (Poland) Wisla Krakow		Jackson 12; Jackson 16; Yacoubou 20
	Final	65–52	(Spain) Rivas		Lyttle 18

== Honours ==
=== International ===
- European Cup / EuroLeague (1): 2012

=== National ===
- Liga (8): 2001, 2002, 2004, 2007, 2008, 2009, 2010, 2012
- Copa de la Reina (7): 2002, 2003, 2004, 2007, 2008, 2009, 2010
- Supercopa de España (6): 2004, 2005, 2007, 2008, 2009, 2010

== 2011–12 Roster ==
Ros Casares Valencia roster
Players
Coaches

Pos.	No.	Nat.	Name	Ht.	Wt.
F/C		(Portugal)	Reis, Sónia	1.89 m (6 ft 2 in)
F	4	(Czech Republic)	Veselá, Jana	1.94 m (6 ft 4 in)
C	5	(Spain)	Cotano, Rebeca	1.84 m (6 ft 0 in)
G	6	(Spain)	Domínguez, Silvia	1.67 m (5 ft 6 in)
C	7	(France) (Benin)	Yacoubou, Isabelle	1.90 m (6 ft 3 in)
C	8	(Spain)	Forasté, Miriam	1.90 m (6 ft 3 in)
G	9	(Spain)	Palau, Laia (C)	1.78 m (5 ft 10 in)
PF	10	(Spain)	Balart, Marlés	1.82 m (6 ft 0 in)
G	11	(Hungary)	Honti, Katalin	1.78 m (5 ft 10 in)
C	12	(Belgium)	Wauters, Ann	1.95 m (6 ft 5 in)
	13	(Spain)	Sáez, Virginia	1.82 m (6 ft 0 in)
G	14	(United States)	Murphy, Eshaya	1.82 m (6 ft 0 in)
PF	15	(Australia)	Jackson, Lauren	1.95 m (6 ft 5 in)
PF	20	(Saint Vincent and the Grenadines) (Spain)	Lyttle, Sancho	1.90 m (6 ft 3 in)
SF	23	(United States)	Moore, Maya	1.83 m (6 ft 0 in)

Head coach

- (Spain) Roberto Íñiguez

Legend

- (C) Team captain
- Injured

- Roster
Updated: 2011-10-19

== WNBA Players ==
WNBA players who have played for Ros Casares Valencia include Lauren Jackson, Sancho Lyttle, Chamique Holdsclaw, Maya Moore, Małgorzata Dydek, DeLisha Milton-Jones, Katie Douglas, Candice Wiggins, Becky Hammon, Ann Wauters, Razija Mujanović, Jana Veselá, Belinda Snell, Amaya Valdemoro, Rebekkah Brunson, Suzy Batkovic, Elisa Aguilar, Anna Montañana, Trisha Fallon, Shannon Johnson, Marta Fernández, Murriel Page, Evanthia Maltsi and Eshaya Murphy. Nicky Anosike and Taj McWilliams-Franklin have also played for the club.
