= 2003–04 EuroLeague Women =

The 2003–04 season was the 8th edition of Europe's premier basketball tournament for women - EuroLeague Women since it was rebranded to its current format

== Regular season ==
=== Group A ===
	Team	Pld	W	L	PF	PA	Diff	Pts
1.	(Russia) UMMC Ekaterinburg	14	11	3	1062	868		25
2.	(France) CJM Bourges Basket	14	11	3	984	871		25
3.	(France) Pays d'Aix Basket 13	14	9	5	1029	900		23
4.	(Hungary) Euroleasing-Orsi Sopron	14	9	5	1046	930		23
5.	(Spain) Universitat FC Barcelona	14	9	5	1029	900		23
6.	(Italy) CariChieti C.U.S. Chieti	14	3	11	898	1118		16
7.	(Czech Republic) UŠK Blex Prague	14	3	11	811	1018		16
8.	(Slovakia) MBK Ružomberok	14	1	13	908	1167		15

=== Group B ===
	Team	Pld	W	L	PF	PA	Diff	Pts
1.	(France) US Valenciennes Olympic	14	9	5	1098	975		23
2.	(Poland) Lotos VBW Clima Gdynia	14	9	5	1069	1019		23
3.	(Hungary) MiZo Pécsi VSK	14	9	5	982	945		23
4.	(Czech Republic) Gambrinus Brno	14	8	6	976	918		22
5.	(Spain) Ros Casares Valencia	14	7	7	933	923		21
6.	(Russia) VBM-SGAU Samara	14	6	8	933	977		20
7.	(Lithuania) Lietuvos Telekomas	14	5	9	948	972		19
8.	(Italy) Lavezzini Parma	14	3	11	923	1133		17

== Knockout stage ==
=== Quarterfinals ===
Game 1 was played 2 March 2004. Game 2 was played 5 March 2004. Game 3 was played 10 March 2004. The team that won two games first, advanced to the Final four.

Team #1	Agg.	Team #2	1st leg	2nd leg	3rd leg
UMMC Ekaterinburg (Russia)	0 – 2	(Czech Republic) Gambrinus Brno	0 – 20	0 – 20	
CJM Bourges Basket (France)	0 – 2	(Hungary) MiZo Pécsi VSK	58 – 62	84 – 85	
US Valenciennes Olympic (France)	2 – 1	(Hungary) Euroleasing-Orsi Sopron	80 – 68	65 – 69	62 – 59
Lotos VBW Clima Gdynia (Poland)	2 – 1	(France) Pays d'Aix Basket 13	79 – 49	64 – 66	80 – 65

== Final four ==
The venue was on 4–6 April 2004. Pécs hosted the event at the Lauber Dezső Sportcsarnok.

Semi-finals
4 April
(Hungary) MiZo Pécsi VSK	53
(France) US Valenciennes	75
4 April
(Czech Republic) Gambrinus Brno	52
(Poland) Lotos VBW Clima Gdynia	57

Final
6 April
(Poland) Lotos VBW Clima Gdynia	69
(France) US Valenciennes	93
Third place
6 April
(Hungary) MiZo Pécsi VSK	69
(Czech Republic) Gambrinus Brno	65

Euroleague Women 2004 Champions

US Valenciennes Olympic
Second title
