= 2007–08 EuroLeague Women =

- League: EuroLeague Women
- Sport: Basketball

Regular Season

Final

EuroLeague Women seasons
- ← 2006–07 2008–09 →

The EuroLeague Women is an international basketball club competition for elite women's clubs throughout Europe. The 2007-2008 season features 24 competing teams from 13 different countries. The draw for the groups was held on August 5, 2007 at the Kempinski Hotel in Munich. The competition began on November 7, 2007. The 2008 Final Four is scheduled for April 11–13, 2008.

== Teams of the 2007-2008 Euroleague Women ==
Country	Teams	Teams (place in national championship)			
France	4	US Valenciennes Olympic (1)	Bourges Basket (2)	ESB Lille Metropole (3-4)	USO Mondeville (3-4)
Russia	4	Spartak Moscow Region (1)	CSKA Moscow (2)	Dynamo Moscow (3-4)	UMMC Ekaterinburg (3-4)
Czech Republic	2	Gambrinus SIKA Brno (1)	ZVVZ USK Praha (2)		
Hungary	2	MKB Euroleasing Sopron (1)	MiZo Pécs 2010 (2)		
Italy	2	Phard Napoli (1)	Germano Zama Faenza (2)		
Poland	2	Wisła Can-Pack Kraków (1)	Lotos PKO BP Gdynia (2)		
Spain	2	Ros Casares Valencia (1)	Perfumerias Avenida (2)		
Belgium	1	Dexia W Namur (1)			
Croatia	1	Šibenik Jolly JBS (1)			
Latvia	1	TTT Riga (1)			
Lithuania	1	TEO Vilnius (1)			
Slovakia	1	Kosit 2013 Kosice (1)			
Turkey	1	Fenerbahçe Istanbul (1)			

== Format ==
=== Regular season ===
The first phase is a regular season, in which the competing teams are drawn into four groups, each containing six teams. Each team plays every other team in its group at home and away, resulting in 10 games for each team in the first stage. The top 4 teams in each group advance to the next round. The complete list of tiebreakers is provided in the lead-in to the Regular Season results.

=== Eighth-Final ===
The top 4 teams from each froup advance to the next Eighth-Final Play-offs. Each round will be played at two games (home and away) or three games (if necessary, score 1-1, by winning at home, and losing at away) to advance to the next stage.

=== Quarter-final ===
The winners from Eighth-Final advance to Quarter-Finals. Round will be played at two games (home and away) or three games (if necessary score 1-1, by winning at home, and losing at away) to advance to the final Four.

=== Final four ===
The Final Four will meet four teams, winners of quarter-finals. It semifinals and finals (third place game). It will be on April 11 and April 14.

== Regular season ==
Tiebreakers:

- Head-to-head record in matches between the tied clubs
- Overall goal average in games between the tied clubs (points scored divided by points allowed)
- Overall goal average in all group matches (first tiebreaker if tied clubs are not in the same group)

=== Group A ===
	Team	Pld	W	L	PF	PA	Diff
1.	(Russia) CSKA Moscow	10	10	0	891	630	+261
2.	(Turkey) Fenerbahçe Istanbul	10	6	4	717	732	-15
3.	(Hungary) MKB Euroleasing Sopron	10	5	5	718	729	-11
4.	(France) ESB Lille Metropole	10	4	6	665	758	-93
5.	(Latvia) TTT Riga	10	3	7	629	698	-69
6.	(Italy) Phard Napoli	10	2	8	703	776	-73

=== Group B ===
	Team	Pld	W	L	PF	PA	Diff
1.	(Russia) UMMC Ekaterinburg	10	9	1	790	606	+184
2.	(France) Bourges Basket	10	6	4	670	620	+50
3.	(Poland) Wisła Can-Pack Kraków	10	5	5	658	709	-51
4.	(Spain) Halcon Avenida	10	4	6	732	793	-61
5.	(Czech Republic) ZVVZ USK Praha	10	3	7	686	741	-55
6.	(Croatia) Šibenik Jolly JBS	10	3	7	672	739	-67

=== Group C ===
	Team	Pld	W	L	PF	PA	Diff
1.	(Russia) Spartak Moscow Region	10	9	1	839	676	+163
2.	(Czech Republic) Gambrinus SIKA Brno	10	8	2	840	689	+151
3.	(Poland) Lotos PKO BP Gdynia	10	5	5	747	732	+15
4.	(France) US Valenciennes Olympic	10	4	6	665	744	-79
5.	(Slovakia) Kosit 2013 Kosice	10	3	7	648	717	-69
6.	(Belgium) Dexia W Namur	10	1	9	626	807	-181

=== Group D ===
	Team	Pld	W	L	PF	PA	Diff
1.	(Spain) Ros Casares Valencia	10	10	0	790	646	+144
2.	(Russia) Dynamo Moscow	10	6	4	719	688	+31
3.	(Hungary) MiZo Pécs 2010	10	6	4	725	739	-14
4.	(Lithuania) TEO Vilnius	10	3	7	699	744	-45
5.	(France) USO Mondeville Basket	10	3	7	723	726	-3
6.	(Italy) Germano Zama Faenza	10	2	8	628	741	-113

== Knockout stage ==
=== EighthFinals ===
Team #1	Agg.	Team #2	1st leg	2nd leg	3rd leg^{*}
CSKA Moscow (Russia)	2 - 0	(Spain) Halcon Avenida	83 - 64	78 - 70	
UMMC Ekaterinburg (Russia)	2 - 0	(France) ESB Lille Metropole	96 - 50	71 - 64	
Fenerbahçe Istanbul (Turkey)	2 - 0	(Poland) Wisła Can-Pack Kraków	78 - 61	67 - 59	
Bourges Basket (France)	2 - 0	(Hungary) MKB Euroleasing Sopron	69 - 47	68 - 48	
Spartak Moscow Region (Russia)	2 - 0	(Lithuania) TEO Vilnius	93 - 67	83 - 71	
Ros Casares Valencia (Spain)	2 - 1	(France) US Valenciennes Olympic	70 - 44	63 - 71	70 - 46
Gambrinus SIKA Brno (Czech Republic)	2 - 1	(Hungary) MiZo Pécs 2010	71 - 67	55 - 58	84 - 45
Dynamo Moscow (Russia)	2 - 0	(Poland) Lotos PKO BP Gdynia	86 - 75	79 - 74 (OT)	

=== QuarterFinals ===
Team #1	Agg.	Team #2	1st leg	2nd leg	3rd leg^{*}
CSKA Moscow (Russia)	0 - 2	(Russia) UMMC Ekaterinburg	74 - 81	90 - 94	
Bourges Basket (France)	2 - 0	(Turkey) Fenerbahçe Istanbul	85 - 69	74 - 72	
Spartak Moscow Region (Russia)	2 - 0	(Russia) Dynamo Moscow	96 - 67	98 - 58	
Ros Casares Valencia (Spain)	1 - 2	(Czech Republic) Gambrinus SIKA Brno	71 - 63	55 - 65	69 - 75

- if necessary

== Final four ==
The Final Four is the last phase of each Euroleague Women season, and is held over a weekend. The semifinal games are played on Friday evening. Sunday starts with the third-place game, followed by the championship final.

=== Bracket ===
Semi-finals
April 11, Brno
(Russia) UMMC Ekaterinburg	68
(Russia) Spartak Moscow Region	78
April 11, Brno
(Czech Republic) Gambrinus SIKA Brno	90
(France) Bourges Basket	81

Final
April 13, Brno
(Russia) Spartak Moscow Region	75
(Czech Republic) Gambrinus SIKA Brno	60
Third place
April 13, Brno
(Russia) UMMC Ekaterinburg	70
(France) Bourges Basket	69

== Individual leaders ==
=== Points ===
Rank	Name	Team	Games	Points	PPG
1.	(Australia) Lauren Jackson	Spartak Moscow Region	15	354	23.6
2.	(United States) Cappie Pondexter	Fenerbahçe Istanbul	14	309	22.1
3.	(Latvia) Anete Jekabsone-Zogota	Dynamo Moscow	12	264	22.0
4.	(United States) Chamique Holdsclaw	Lotos PKO BP Gdynia	12	228	19.0
5.	(United States) Kedra Holland-Corn	Phard Napoli	10	188	18.8

=== Rebounds ===
Rank	Name	Team	Games	Rebounds	RPG
1.	(United States) Nicole Ohlde	US Valenciennes Olympic	13	124	9.5
2.	(Israel) Jennifer Fleischer	Dexia W Namur	10	91	9.1
3.	(Belgium) Ann Wauters	CSKA Moscow	13	118	9.1
4.	(United States) Iciss Tillis	TTT Riga	9	80	8.9
5.	(Belarus) Yelena Leuchanka	TEO Vilnius; UMMC Ekaterinburg	14	124	8.9

=== Assists ===
Rank	Name	Team	Games	Assists	APG
1.	(Hungary) Dalma Iványi	MiZo Pécs 2010	13	74	5.7
2.	(France) Caroline Aubert	USO Mondeville Basket; UMMC Ekaterinburg	16	80	5.0
3.	(Belgium) Kathy Wambe	ESB Lille Metropole	10	48	4.8
4.	(United States) Sue Bird	Spartak Moscow Region	14	65	4.6
5.	(Montenegro) Jelena Škerović	Wisła Can-Pack Kraków	12	54	4.5
