= 2001–02 EuroLeague Women =

The 2001–02 Euroleague Women was the sixth edition of the Euroleague era of FIBA's premier international competition for European women's basketball clubs, running between 31 October 2001 and 28 April 2002. Last year's runner-up US Valenciennes Olympic defeated Lotos Gdynia in the final to become the second French club to win the competition.

== Group stage ==
=== Group A ===
#	Team	Pld	W	L	PF	PA
1	(France) Bourges	14	13	1	1031	845
2	(Slovakia) Ruzomberok	14	12	2	1192	1008
3	(Italy) Pool Comense	14	10	4	1075	920
4	(Hungary) Pécsi	14	9	5	1018	856
5	(Turkey) Botas	14	4	10	937	1122
6	(Germany) Goldzack Wuppertal	14	3	11	899	1030
7	(France) Aix	14	4	10	887	1054
8	(Israel) Ramat HaSharon	14	2	12	1018	1222

=== Group B ===
#	Team	Pld	W	L	PF	PA
1	(France) Valenciennes	14	12	2	1046	864
2	(Poland) Lotos Gdynia	14	10	4	1109	1065
3	(Hungary) Gysev Sopron	14	8	6	1081	856
4	(Italy) Lavezzini Parma	14	8	6	933	951
5	(Spain) Ros Casares	14	6	8	945	959
6	(Czech Republic) Gambrinus Brno	14	6	8	1018	985
7	(Turkey) Fenerbahçe	14	4	10	953	1081
8	(Lithuania) Lietuvos Telekomas	14	2	12	854	1038

== Quarter-finals ==
Team #1	Agg.	Team #2	1st	2nd	3rd
Bourges (France)	0–2	(Italy) Lavezzini Parma	58–66	57–72	
Lotos Gdynia (Poland)	2–1	(Italy) Pool Comense	104–64	73–78	78–72
Ruzomberok (Slovakia)	2–1	(Hungary) Gysev Sopron	96–83	68–87	98–78
Valenciennes (France)	2–1	(Hungary) Pécsi	75–70	55–59	63–56

== Final four ==
- Gdynia, Poland

Semi-finals
26 April
(Italy) Lavezzini Parma	58
(Poland) Lotos Gdynia	74
26 April
(Slovakia) Ruzomberok	60
(France) Valenciennes	108

Final
28 April
(Poland) Lotos Gdynia	72
(France) Valenciennes	78
Third place
28 April
(Italy) Lavezzini Parma	75
(Slovakia) Ruzomberok	57
