= Fenerbahçe Women Euroleague 2006–07 =

The EuroLeague Women is an international basketball club competition for elite clubs throughout Europe. The 2006-2007 season featured 18 competing teams from 10 countries. The draw for the groups was held on August 6, 2006, in Munich. The competition began on November 1, 2006.

Note that the competition is operated by FIBA Europe — unlike the men's Euroleague, which is run by the Euroleague Basketball (company).

== Group stage ==
=== Group C ===
	Team	Pld	W	L	PF	PA	Diff
1.	(Turkey) Fenerbahçe Istanbul	10	8	2	711	650	61
2.	(Spain) Ros Casares Valencia	10	6	4	738	6652	86
3.	(Czech Republic) Gambrinus Brno	10	6	4	690	621	69
4.	(Russia) UMMC Ekaterinburg	10	6	4	697	707	-10
5.	(France) US Valenciennes	10	3	7	667	708	-41
6.	(Poland) Lotos Gdynia	10	1	9	600	765	-165

== Knockout stage ==
=== Round of 16 ===
Team #1	Agg.	Team #2	1st leg	2nd leg	3rd leg^{*}
Fenerbahçe Istanbul (Turkey)	2 - 1	(Belgium) Dexia Namur	80-66	59-66	84-56
Ros Casares Valencia (Spain)	2 - 0	(Poland) Wisla Can-Pack	80-72	67-57	

=== Round of 8 ===
Team #1	Agg.	Team #2	1st leg	2nd leg	3rd leg^{*}
Fenerbahçe Istanbul (Turkey)	1 - 2	(Spain) Ros Casares Valencia	69-67	53-71	80-82

- if necessary
