= 2009–10 EuroLeague Women =

- League: EuroLeague Women
- Sport: Basketball

Regular Season

Final
- Champions: (Russia) Spartak Moscow Region
- Runners-up: (Spain) Ros Casares Valencia

EuroLeague Women seasons
- ← 2008–09 2010–11 →

The 2009–10 season was the 14th edition of Europe's premier basketball tournament for women - EuroLeague Women since it was rebranded to its current format

== Regular season ==
=== Group A ===
| | Team | Pld | W | L | PF | PA | Diff |
|---|---|---|---|---|---|---|---|
| 1. | (Russia) UMMC Ekaterinburg | 10 | 9 | 1 | 777 | 588 | +189 |
| 2. | (Spain) Ros Casares Valencia | 10 | 8 | 2 | 802 | 596 | +206 |
| 3. | (Italy) Cras Basket Taranto | 10 | 6 | 4 | 701 | 678 | +23 |
| 4. | (Turkey) Galatasaray Istanbul | 10 | 4 | 6 | 665 | 675 | −10 |
| 5. | (Latvia) TTT Riga | 10 | 2 | 8 | 557 | 772 | −215 |
| 6. | (Lithuania) TEO Vilnius | 10 | 1 | 9 | 587 | 780 | −193 |

=== Group B ===
| | Team | Pld | W | L | PF | PA | Diff |
|---|---|---|---|---|---|---|---|
| 1. | (Poland) Wisła Can-Pack Kraków | 10 | 9 | 1 | 789 | 734 | +55 |
| 2. | (Spain) Halcon Avenida Salamanca | 10 | 8 | 2 | 758 | 632 | +126 |
| 3. | (Italy) Beretta Famila Schio | 10 | 7 | 3 | 763 | 710 | +53 |
| 4. | (Hungary) MiZo Pécs 2010 | 10 | 4 | 6 | 723 | 670 | +53 |
| 5. | Gospić Croatia Osiguranje | 10 | 1 | 9 | 721 | 797 | −76 |
| 6. | (France) ESB Villeneuve-d’Ascq | 10 | 1 | 9 | 631 | 842 | −211 |

=== Group C ===
| | Team | Pld | W | L | PF | PA | Diff |
|---|---|---|---|---|---|---|---|
| 1. | (Spain) Rivas Ecopolis | 10 | 7 | 3 | 746 | 668 | +78 |
| 2. | (Slovakia) Good Angels Košice | 10 | 6 | 4 | 719 | 712 | +7 |
| 3. | (Czech Republic) ZVVZ USK Praha | 10 | 5 | 5 | 769 | 773 | −4 |
| 4. | (France) Bourges Basket | 10 | 5 | 5 | 658 | 629 | +29 |
| 5. | (Hungary) MKB Euroleasing Sopron | 10 | 4 | 6 | 723 | 767 | −44 |
| 6. | (Poland) KSSSE AZS PWSZ Gorzów | 10 | 3 | 7 | 707 | 773 | −66 |

=== Group D ===
| | Team | Pld | W | L | PF | PA | Diff |
|---|---|---|---|---|---|---|---|
| 1. | (Russia) Spartak Moscow Region | 10 | 10 | 0 | 860 | 639 | +221 |
| 2. | (Turkey) Fenerbahçe Istanbul | 10 | 7 | 3 | 762 | 748 | +14 |
| 3. | (Czech Republic) Frisco SIKA Brno | 10 | 6 | 4 | 729 | 723 | +6 |
| 4. | (Poland) Lotos Gdynia | 10 | 3 | 7 | 681 | 743 | −62 |
| 5. | (Hungary) Szeviép Szeged | 10 | 2 | 8 | 662 | 758 | −96 |
| 6. | (France) Tarbes Gespe Bigorre | 10 | 2 | 8 | 696 | 779 | −83 |

== Knockout stage ==
=== Eight-finals ===
| Team #1 | Agg. | Team #2 | 1st leg | 2nd leg | 3rd leg^{*} |
|---|---|---|---|---|---|
| Spartak Moscow Region (Russia) | 2 - 0 | (Poland) Lotos Gdynia | 98 - 49 | 91 - 69 | |
| UMMC Ekaterinburg (Russia) | 2 - 0 | (Turkey) Galatasaray Istanbul | 79 - 55 | 61 - 50 | |
| Wisła Can-Pack Kraków (Poland) | 2 - 1 | (Hungary) MiZo Pécs 2010 | 80 - 53 | 64 - 68 | 69 - 57 |
| Ros Casares Valencia (Spain) | 2 - 0 | (Czech Republic) ZVVZ USK Praha | 81 - 70 | 85 - 74 | |
| Halcon Avenida Salamanca (Spain) | 2 - 1 | (France) Bourges Basket | 72 - 53 | 64 - 69 | 64 - 55 |
| Rivas Ecopolis (Spain) | 1 - 2 | (Czech Republic) Frisco SIKA Brno | 83 - 88 | 67 - 64 | 63 - 77 |
| Beretta Famila Schio (Italy) | 0 - 2 | (Slovakia) Good Angels Košice | 67 - 70 | 59 - 65 | |
| Fenerbahçe Istanbul (Turkey) | 2 - 0 | (Italy) Cras Basket Taranto | 89 - 83 | 60 - 55 | |

=== Quarter-finals ===
| Team #1 | Agg. | Team #2 | 1st leg | 2nd leg | 3rd leg^{*} |
|---|---|---|---|---|---|
| Spartak Moscow Region (Russia) | 2 - 0 | (Turkey) Fenerbahçe Istanbul | 90 - 79 | 87 - 85 | |
| UMMC Ekaterinburg (Russia) | 2 - 0 | (Slovakia) Good Angels Košice | 81 - 56 | 65 - 60 | |
| Wisła Can-Pack Kraków (Poland) | 2 - 1 | (Czech Republic) Frisco SIKA Brno | 78 - 74 | 72 - 87 | 78 - 73 |
| Ros Casares Valencia (Spain) | 2 - 0 | (Spain) Halcon Avenida Salamanca | 74 - 50 | 63 - 57 | |

== Final four ==
Semifinals
April 9,
(Poland) Wisła Can-Pack Kraków | 59
(Spain) Ros Casares Valencia | 86
April 9,
(Russia) UMMC Ekaterinburg | 79
(Russia) Spartak Moscow Region | 87

Final
April 11,
(Spain) Ros Casares Valencia | 80
(Russia) Spartak Moscow Region | 87
Third place
April 11,
(Poland) Wisła Can-Pack Kraków | 50
(Russia) UMMC Ekaterinburg | 84

== Individual leaders ==
Stats includes postseason games and are sorted on average per game.

=== Points per game ===
| Rank | Name | Team | Games | Points | PPG |
|---|---|---|---|---|---|
| 1 | (United States) Diana Taurasi | (Russia) Spartak Moscow Region | 16 | 398 | 24.9 |
| 2 | (United States) Angel McCoughtry | (Slovakia) Good Angels Košice | 12 | 228 | 19.0 |
| 3 | (United States) Candice Dupree | (Slovakia) Good Angels Košice | 14 | 264 | 18.9 |
| 4 | (Spain) Sancho Lyttle | (Spain) Halcon Avenida Salamanca | 15 | 264 | 17.6 |
| 5 | (Saint Vincent and the Grenadines) Sophia Young | (Turkey) Galatasaray Istanbul | 12 | 207 | 17.3 |

=== Offensive rebounds per game ===
| Rank | Name | Team | Games | Rebounds | ORPG |
|---|---|---|---|---|---|
| 1 | (United States) Janell Burse | (Poland) Wisła Can-Pack Kraków | 18 | 69 | 3.8 |
| 2 | (Brazil) Erika de Souza | (Spain) Ros Casares Valencia | 16 | 56 | 3.5 |
| 2 | (United States) Crystal Langhorne | (Spain) Rivas Ecopolis | 13 | 45 | 3.5 |
| 4 | (United States) Angel McCoughtry | (Slovakia) Good Angels Košice | 12 | 38 | 3.2 |
| 5 | (United States) Sylvia Fowles | (Russia) Spartak Moscow Region | 16 | 50 | 3.1 |

=== Rebounds per game ===
| Rank | Name | Team | Games | Rebounds | RPG |
|---|---|---|---|---|---|
| 1 | (United States) Candice Dupree | (Slovakia) Good Angels Košice | 14 | 154 | 11.0 |
| 2 | (Spain) Sancho Lyttle | (Spain) Halcon Avenida Salamanca | 15 | 162 | 10.8 |
| 3 | (United States) Janell Burse | (Poland) Wisła Can-Pack Kraków | 18 | 189 | 10.5 |
| 4 | (Montenegro) Milka Bjelica | (Lithuania) TEO Vilnius | 9 | 83 | 9.2 |
| 5 | (United States) Crystal Langhorne | (Spain) Rivas Ecopolis | 13 | 117 | 9 |

=== Assists per game ===
| Rank | Name | Team | Games | Assists | APG |
|---|---|---|---|---|---|
| 1 | (Croatia) Anđa Jelavić | Gospić Croatia Osiguranje | 9 | 60 | 6.7 |
| 2 | (Hungary) Dalma Ivanyi | (Hungary) MiZo Pécs 2010 | 13 | 86 | 6.6 |
| 3 | (Australia) Samantha Richards | (Poland) KSSSE AZS PWSZ Gorzów | 10 | 47 | 4.7 |
| 4 | (Spain) Clara Bermejo | (Spain) Rivas Ecopolis | 13 | 56 | 4.3 |
| 5 | (Turkey) Birsel Vardarli Demirmen | (Turkey) Fenerbahçe Istanbul | 14 | 59 | 4.2 |

=== Other statistics ===
| Category | Player | Team | Games | Average |
|---|---|---|---|---|
| Steals | (United States) Angel McCoughtry | (Slovakia) Good Angels Košice | 12 | 3.3 |
| Blocks | (United States) Candice Dupree | (Slovakia) Good Angels Košice | 14 | 1.4 |
| Turnovers | (Croatia) Anđa Jelavić | Gospić Croatia Osiguranje | 15 | 4.3 |
| Fouls committed | (Hungary) Dora Horti | (Hungary) MKB Euroleasing Sopron | 10 | 3.8 |
| Minutes | (United States) Candice Dupree | (Slovakia) Good Angels Košice | 14 | 39:06 |
| 2P% | (Czech Republic) Petra Kulichova | (Czech Republic) Frisco SIKA Brno | 9 | 67.8% |
| 3P% | (Czech Republic) Eva Viteckova | (Czech Republic) Frisco SIKA Brno | 16 | 55.1% |
| FT% | (Australia) Penny Taylor | (Turkey) Fenerbahçe Istanbul | 14 | 88.9% |

=== Individual game highs ===
| Category | Player | Team | Statistic |
|---|---|---|---|
| Points | (United States) Diana Taurasi | (Russia) Spartak Moscow Region | 38 |
| Offensive Rebounds | (United States) Janell Burse | (Poland) Wisła Can-Pack Kraków | 10 |
| Total Rebounds | (United States) DeWanna Bonner | (Czech Republic) Frisco SIKA Brno | 21 |
| Assists | (Spain) Marta Fernandez | (Poland) Wisła Can-Pack Kraków | 13 |
| Assists | (Hungary) Dalma Ivanyi | (Hungary) MiZo Pécs 2010 | 13 |
| Assists | (Turkey) Birsel Vardarli Demirmen | (Turkey) Fenerbahçe Istanbul | 13 |
| Steals | (United States) Janel McCarville | (United States) Spartak Moscow Region | 9 |
| Three pointers made | (Belgium) Anke De Mondt | (Spain) Halcon Avenida Salamanca | 8 |
| Three pointers made | (United States) Diana Taurasi | (Russia) Spartak Moscow Region | 8 |
| Free throws made | (Italy) Laura Macchi | (Italy) Beretta Famila Schio | 13 |
| Turnovers | (Spain) Anna Cruz | (Spain) Rivas Ecopolis | 9 |
| Turnovers | (Hungary) Bernadett Németh | (Hungary) Szeviép Szeged | 9 |

== Team leaders ==
Stats includes postseason games and are sorted on average per game.

| Category | Team | Average |
|---|---|---|
| Points | (Russia) Spartak Moscow Region | 87.5 |
| Fewest Points Allowed | (Russia) UMMC Ekaterinburg | 59.1 |
| Offensive Rebounds | (Hungary) MiZo Pécs 2010 | 12.3 |
| Total Rebounds | (Russia) Spartak Moscow Region | 39.6 |
| Assists | (Russia) Spartak Moscow Region | 16.5 |
| Steals | (Spain) Ros Casares | 10.8 |
| Blocks | (Russia) UMMC Ekaterinburg | 4.5 |
| Turnovers | (Lithuania) TEO Vilnius | 20.1 |
| 2-PT % | (Russia) Spartak Moscow Region | 53.7% |
| 3-PT % | (Russia) Spartak Moscow Region | 42.4% |
| FT % | (Turkey) Fenerbahçe Istanbul | 84.3% |
