= László Rátgéber =

Hungarian basketball coach

Personal information
- Born: 11 October 1966 (age 60) Novi Sad, SFR Yugoslavia
- Listed height: 1.75 m (5 ft 9 in)
- Listed weight: 76 kg (168 lb)
- Coaching career: 1984–present

Career history

Coaching
- 1984–1993: Vojvodina
- 1993–2008: Pécsi VSK
- 1997–2004: Hungary (women's)
- 2008–2009: Spartak Moscow
- 2010–2011: Fenerbahçe
- 2012: Hungary (men's team)

László Rátgéber (born 11 October 1966) is a Hungarian basketball coach, most well known for winning the EuroLeague Women with Spartak Moscow in 2009. He had three further trips to the Final Four with Pécs, winning bronze in 2001 and 2004. Rátgéber is the only coach who had fulfilled the position of head coach on both the men's, and the women's national basketball team of Hungary.

== Coaching career ==
Between 1984 and 1993, he coached the Vojvodina (Yugoslavia). In 1992, he worked with the national team of Yugoslavia as assistant coach. In 1993, he moved to Pécs, Hungary and he coached Hungarian powerhouse Pécsi VSK between 1993 and 2008 where he won 9 national championships and 9 national cups. He led Pécs to the EuroLeague Women Final Four three times, winning bronze in 2001, and 2004. His record of 777 games and 80% win percentage makes him the most successful Hungarian club coach.

He won the Russian Women's Basketball league and EuroLeague Women in 2009 with Spartak Moscow, then coached Fenerbahçe Istanbul in 2010. He coached Hungarian powerhouse MiZo Pécs between 1993 and 2008 where he won 10 league championships and 10 domestic cups.

He was the EuroLeague Women All Star 2011 World Team's Coach. He has also coached the Hungary women's national basketball team between 1997 and 2004.

== Personal life ==
Rátgéber was born in a basketball family, his father (László Rátgéber) was the head coach of the national basketball team of Yugoslavia, her mother Julianna Pavlik was a national team player and two times national champion. Married, father of two son. His wife is Magdolna Csák, former professional basketball player and national team member 125 times.

== Career achievements and awards ==
- (Europe) EuroLeague Women
  - Winner (1): 2009 with Spartak Moscow
  - Final four (4): 2001, 2004, 2005 with MiZo Pécsi VSK, 2009 with Spartak Moscow
- Europe SuperCup Women (2): 2008, 2009
- (Russia) Russian Women's Basketball League (2): 2008, 2009
- (Hungary) Hungarian Women's Basketball League (9): 1995, 1996, 1998, 2000, 2001, 2003, 2004, 2005, 2006
- (Hungary) Hungarian Women's Basketball League Cup (9): 1997, 1998, 1999, 2000, 2001, 2002, 2003, 2005, 2006
- (Turkey) Turkish Women's Basketball League (1): 2010–11
- (Turkey) Turkish Super Cup (1): 2010
- (Europe) EuroBasket Women: 4th place with Hungary women's national basketball team (1997), as assistant coach
