= Euroleague Women 2007–08 Regular Season Group D =

Standings and Results for Group D of the Regular Season phase of the 2007-08 Euroleague Women basketball tournament.

Main page: EuroLeague Women 2007-08

Key to colors
Top four places in each group, advance to Eighth-Final Play-Offs
Eliminated

== Standings ==
	Team	Pld	W	L	PF	PA	Diff
1.	(Spain) Ros Casares Valencia	10	10	0	790	646	+144
2.	(Russia) Dynamo Moscow	10	6	4	719	688	+31
3.	(Hungary) MiZo Pécs 2010	10	6	4	725	739	-14
4.	(Lithuania) TEO Vilnius	10	3	7	699	744	-45
5.	(France) USO Mondeville Basket	10	3	7	723	726	-3
6.	(Italy) Germano Zama Faenza	10	2	8	628	741	-113

== Fixtures and results ==
=== Game 1 ===
November 7–8, 2007

November 7
17:00

(Report)

Valencia (Spain)	71–52	(Italy) Germano Zama
Scoring by quarter: 14-11, 21-10, 13-16, 23-15

Valencia

November 8
18:00

(Report)

Dynamo Moscow (Russia)	77–48	(Hungary) MiZo Pécs 2010
Scoring by quarter: 20-13, 21-17, 14-7, 22-11

Moscow

November 8
18:00

(Report)

TEO Vilnius (Lithuania)	75–70	(France) USO Mondeville
Scoring by quarter: 15-23, 25-14, 24-19, 11-14

Vilnius

=== Game 2 ===
November 14–15, 2007

November 14
20:00

(Report)

USO Mondeville (France)	61–77	(Spain) Valencia
Scoring by quarter: 16-14, 12-26, 16-22, 17-15

Mondeville

November 14
20:30

(Report)

Germano Zama (Italy)	65–68	(Russia) Dynamo Moscow
Scoring by quarter: 14-15, 15-14, 24-18, 12-21

Faenza

November 15
18:00

(Report)

MiZo Pécs 2010 (Hungary)	84–75	(Lithuania) TEO Vilnius
Scoring by quarter: 18-23, 18-20, 36-18, 12-14

Pécs

=== Game 2 ===
November 21–22, 2007

November 21
18:00

(Report)

TEO Vilnius (Lithuania)	80–86	(Italy) Germano Zama
Scoring by quarter: 24-13, 19-30, 19-26, 18-17

Vilnius

November 21
18:00

(Report)

Dynamo Moscow (Russia)	71–82	(Spain) Valencia
Scoring by quarter: 20-16, 15-24, 25-17, 11-25

Moscow

November 22
18:00

(Report)

MiZo Pécs 2010 (Hungary)	68–60	USO Mondeville (France)
Scoring by quarter: 16-19, 21-12, 14-10, 17-19

Pécs

=== Game 4 ===
November 28, 2007

November 28
20:00

(Report)

USO Mondeville (France)	91–62	(Russia) Dynamo Moscow
Scoring by quarter: 15-11, 31-13, 21-17, 24-21

Mondeville

November 28
20:30

(Report)

Germano Zama (Italy)	66–68	(Hungary) MiZo Pécs 2010
Scoring by quarter: 27-19, 13-25, 13-15, 13-9

Faenza

November 28
20:30

(Report)

Valencia (Spain)	75–70	(Lithuania) TEO Vilnius
Scoring by quarter: 19-14, 21-20, 21-17, 14-19

Valencia

=== Game 5 ===
December 5–6, 2007

December 5
20:30

(Report)

Germano Zama (Italy)	77–70	(France) USO Mondeville
Scoring by quarter: 22-19, 15-14, 17-19, 23-18

Faenza

December 6
18:00

(Report)

TEO Vilnius (Lithuania)	78–72	(Russia) Dynamo Moscow
Scoring by quarter: 13-20, 24-14, 20-14, 21-24

Vilnius

December 6
18:00

(Report)

MiZo Pécs 2010 (Hungary)	75–80	(Spain) Valencia
Scoring by quarter: 23-20, 22-25, 17-12, 13-23

Pécs

=== Game 6 ===
December 12–13, 2007

December 12
20:00

(Report)

USO Mondeville (France)	66–64	(Lithuania) TEO Vilnius
Scoring by quarter: 10-21, 22-15, 24-18, 10-10

Mondeville

December 12
20:30

(Report)

Germano Zama (Italy)	54–94	(Spain) Valencia
Scoring by quarter: 14-18, 15-15, 11-25, 14-36

Faenza

December 13
18:00

(Report)

MiZo Pécs 2010 (Hungary)	86–92	(Russia) Dynamo Moscow
Scoring by quarter: 28-20, 19-24, 18-17, 21-31

Pécs

=== Game 7 ===
December 19–20, 2007

December 19
20:30

(Report)

Valencia (Spain)	83–78	(France) USO Mondeville
Scoring by quarter: 23-25, 23-22, 18-15, 19-16

Valencia

December 19
20:30

(Report)

Dynamo Moscow (Russia)	59–49	(Italy) Germano Zama
Scoring by quarter: 13-16, 14-9, 17-15, 15-9

Moscow

December 20
18:00

(Report)

TEO Vilnius (Lithuania)	57–77	(Hungary) MiZo Pécs 2010
Scoring by quarter: 18-19, 11-23, 15-18, 13-17

Vilnius

=== Game 8 ===
January 9, 2008

January 9
20:00

(Report)

USO Mondeville (France)	72–77	(Hungary) MiZo Pécs 2010
Scoring by quarter: 19-22, 17-18

Mondeville

January 9
20:30

(Report)

Valencia (Spain)	55–53	(Russia) Dynamo Moscow
Scoring by quarter: 16-11, 14-20, 14-12, 11-10

Valencia

January 9
20:30

(Report)

Germano Zama (Italy)	40–65	(Lithuania) TEO Vilnius
Scoring by quarter: 11-15, 11-24, 6-15, 12-11

Faenza

=== Game 9 ===
January 16–17, 2008

January 16
18:00

(Report)

Dynamo Moscow (Russia)	75–71	(France) USO Mondeville
Scoring by quarter: 23-18, 12-11, 19-22, 21-20

Moscow

January 17
18:00

(Report)

MiZo Pécs 2010 (Hungary)	82–71	(Italy) Germano Zama
Scoring by quarter: 20-22, 23-18, 19-8, 20-23

Pécs

January 17
18:00

(Report)

TEO Vilnius (Lithuania)	72–84	(Spain) Valencia
Scoring by quarter: 15-21, 16-24, 22-22, 19-17

Vilnius

=== Game 10 ===
January 23, 2008

January 9
18:00

(Report)

Dynamo Moscow (Russia)	90–63	(Lithuania) TEO Vilnius
Scoring by quarter: 17-18, 23-15, 22-14, 28-16

Moscow

January 23
20:00

(Report)

USO Mondeville (France)	84–68	(Italy) Germano Zama
Scoring by quarter: 31-20, 18-18, 19-12, 16-18

Mondeville

January 23
20:30

(Report)

Valencia (Spain)	89–60	(Hungary) MiZo Pécs 2010
Scoring by quarter: 15-12, 16-15, 23-13, 35-20

Valencia
