= Fenerbahçe Women Euroleague 2009–10 =

European women's basketball tournament

The 2009–10 season was the 19th edition of Europe's premier basketball tournament for women - EuroLeague Women since it was rebranded to its current format.

== Group stage ==
=== Group D ===
	Team	Pld	W	L	PF	PA	Diff
1.	(Russia) Spartak Moscow	10	10	0	860	639	+221
2.	(Turkey) Fenerbahçe Istanbul	10	7	3	762	748	+14
3.	(Czech Republic) Frisco SIKA Brno	10	6	4	729	723	+6
4.	(Poland) Lotos Gdynia	10	3	7	681	743	−62
5.	(Hungary) Szeviép Szeged	10	2	8	662	758	−96
6.	(France) Tarbes Gespe Bigorre	10	2	8	696	779	−83

== Knockout stage ==
=== Round of 16 ===
Team #1	Agg.	Team #2	1st leg	2nd leg	3rd leg^{*}
Spartak Moscow (Russia)	2 - 0	(Poland) Lotos Gdynia	98 - 49	91 - 69	
Fenerbahçe Istanbul (Turkey)	2 - 0	(Italy) Cras Basket Taranto	89 - 83	60 - 55	

=== Round of 8 ===
Team #1	Agg.	Team #2	1st leg	2nd leg	3rd leg^{*}
Spartak Moscow (Russia)	2 - 0	(Turkey) Fenerbahçe Istanbul	90 - 79	87 - 85	

- if necessary
