= 2008–09 EuroLeague Women =

- League: EuroLeague Women
- Sport: Basketball

Regular Season

Final

EuroLeague Women seasons
- ← 2007–08 2009–10 →

The 2008-09 season was the 13th edition of Europe's premier basketball tournament for women since it was rebranded to its current format. It was won once again for the third time in a row by Spartak Moscow after defeating 2003 champions UMMC Ekaterinburg and first time finalists Perfumerías Avenida Salamanca in the final four, which took place in the latter's court.

== Regular season ==
=== Group A ===
	Team	Pld	W	L	PF	PA
1.	(France) CJM Bourges Basket	10	7	3	708	570
2.	(Spain) Perfumerías Avenida Salamanca	10	7	3	711	702
3.	(Poland) TS Wisła Kraków	10	6	4	680	669
4.	(Hungary) MiZo Pécs 2010	10	5	5	664	656
5.	(Turkey) Beşiktaş Istanbul	10	3	7	645	735
6.	(Russia) Nadezhda Orenburg	10	2	8	685	761

=== Group B ===
	Team	Pld	W	L	PF	PA
1.	(Italy) Umana Reyer Venice	10	7	3	720	673
2.	(Hungary) MKB Euroleasing Sopron	10	6	4	713	676
3.	(Russia) CSKA Moscow	10	6	4	721	624
4.	(Czech Republic) BK Gambrinus Brno	10	4	6	718	728
5.	(Latvia) TTT Rīga	10	4	6	599	666
6.	(France) ESB Lille Métropole	10	3	7	645	749

=== Group C ===
	Team	Pld	W	L	PF	PA
1.	(Russia) UMMC Ekaterinburg	10	9	1	862	648
2.	(Spain) Ros Casares Valencia	10	8	2	852	674
3.	(Poland) Lotos PKO BP Gdynia	10	4	6	693	750
4.	(Czech Republic) ZVVZ USK Praha	10	4	6	720	782
5.	(France) Union Hainaut Basket Valenciennes	10	3	7	666	821
6.	(Croatia) Šibenik Jolly JBS	10	2	8	726	844

=== Group D ===
	Team	Pld	W	L	PF	PA
1.	(Russia) Spartak Moscow	10	9	1	887	609
2.	(Turkey) Fenerbahçe Istanbul	10	6	4	717	761
3.	(Slovakia) Maxima Broker Košice	10	6	4	698	735
4.	(Lithuania) TEO Vilnius	10	5	5	664	673
5.	(Italy) Beretta Famila Schio	10	3	7	692	743
6.	(France) Basket Lattes	10	1	9	667	804

== Knockout stage ==
=== Eight finals ===
Team #1	Agg.	Team #2	1st leg	2nd leg	3rd leg^{*}
Spartak Moscow (Russia)	2 - 0	(Czech Republic) ZVVZ USK Praha	102 - 86	92 - 78	
Ros Casares Valencia (Spain)	2 - 0	(Slovakia) Maxima Broker Kosice	98 - 53	81 - 48	
UMMC Ekaterinburg (Russia)	2 - 0	(Lithuania) TEO Vilnius	91 - 61	69 - 46	
Fenerbahçe Istanbul (Turkey)	2 - 1	(Poland) Lotos PKO BP Gdynia	87 - 83	60 - 63	79 - 76
Umana Reyer Venice (Italy)	0 - 2	(Hungary) MiZo Pécs 2010	60 - 61	57 - 65	
Perfumerías Avenida Salamanca (Spain)	2 - 1	(Russia) CSKA Moscow	80 - 69	64 - 95	83 - 74
CJM Bourges Basket (France)	2 - 1	(Czech Republic) BK Gambrinus Brno	72 - 57	59 - 61	67 - 62
MKB Euroleasing Sopron (Hungary)	2 - 1	(Poland) TS Wisła Kraków	81 - 58	39 - 52	79 - 70

=== Quarter finals ===
Team #1	Agg.	Team #2	1st leg	2nd leg	3rd leg^{*}
Spartak Moscow (Russia)	2 - 1	(Spain) Ros Casares Valencia	65 - 57	71 - 73	79 - 70
UMMC Ekaterinburg (Russia)	2 - 0	(Turkey) Fenerbahçe Istanbul	94 - 62	70 - 68	
MiZo Pécs 2010 (Hungary)	0 - 2	(Spain) Perfumerías Avenida Salamanca	85 - 63	81 - 76	
CJM Bourges Basket (France)	0 - 2	(Hungary) MKB Euroleasing Sopron	65 - 68	63 - 70	

== Final four ==
Semi-finals
April 3, Salamanca
(Russia) Spartak Moscow	83
(Russia) UMMC Ekaterinburg	74
April 3, Salamanca
(Spain) Avenida Salamanca	85
(Hungary) MKB Eurol. Sopron	78

Final
April 5, Salamanca
(Russia) Spartak Moscow	85
(Spain) Avenida Salamanca	70
Third place
April 13, Salamanca
(Russia) UMMC Ekaterinburg	80
(Hungary) MKB Eurol. Sopron	56

Euroleague Women
2008-09 Winners

Spartak Moscow
Third Title
