= 2000–01 EuroLeague Women =

The 2000–01 Euroleague Women was the fifth edition of the Euroleague era of FIBA's premier international competition for European women's basketball clubs, running between 1 November 2000 and 22 April 2001. CJM Bourges Basket defeated US Valenciennes Olympic in the first final between two teams from the same country since 1962 to win its third title.

== Qualification round ==
=== Group A ===
#	Team	Pld	W	L	PF	PA
1	(Poland) Lotos Gdynia	10	8	2	850	741
2	(Turkey) Galatasaray	10	7	3	703	630
3	(Germany) Goldzack Wuppertal	10	4	6	659	681
4	(Greece) Panathinaikos	10	0	10	593	878

=== Group B ===
#	Team	Pld	W	L	PF	PA
1	(Hungary) MiZo-Pécsi VSK	10	10	0	730	546
2	(Czech Republic) Gambrinus Brno	10	7	3	756	650
3	(France) Bourges	10	4	6	698	700
4	(Russia) Dynamo Moscow	10	0	10	648	811

=== Group C ===
#	Team	Pld	W	L	PF	PA
1	(France) Valenciennes	10	10	0	880	619
2	(Slovakia) Ruzomberok	10	7	3	904	752
3	(Lithuania) Lietuvos Telekomas	10	3	7	634	697
4	(Israel) Elitzur Ramla	10	0	10	557	802

=== Group H ===
#	Team	Pld	W	L	PF	PA
1	(Italy) Pool Comense	10	9	1	845	673
2	(Hungary) GYSEV Sopron	10	8	2	850	670
3	(Italy) Libertas Trogylos	10	2	8	666	928
4	(Greece) Sporting Athens	10	1	9	635	830

== Eight-finals ==
Team #1	Agg.	Team #2	1st	2nd	3rd
Lotos Gdynia (Poland)	2–0	(Greece) Sporting Athens	146–39	87–62	
Gambrinus Brno (Czech Republic)	2–0	(Lithuania) Lietuvos Telekomas	76–56	69–60	
Valenciennes (France)	2–0	(Russia) Dynamo Moscow	97–55	80–72	
GYSEV Sopron (Hungary)	2–1	(Germany) Goldzack Wuppertal	84–70	58–79	81–58
Pécsi (Hungary)	2–0	(Israel) Elitzur Ramla	81–63	78–64	
Galatasaray (Turkey)	2–0	(Italy) Libertas Trogylos	69–49	70–63	
Pool Comense (Italy)	2–0	(Greece) Panathinaikos	99–51	87–53	
Ruzomberok (Slovakia)	0–2	(France) Bourges	69–79	65–84	

== Quarter-finals ==
Team #1	Agg.	Team #2	1st	2nd	3rd
Gdynia (Poland)	1–2	(Czech Republic) Gambrinus Brno	76–71	61–81	64–80
Valenciennes (France)	2–0	(Hungary) Gysev Sopron	70–67	85–68	
Pécsi (Hungary)	2–0	(Turkey) Galatasaray	73–58	54–52	
Pool Comense (Italy)	1–2	(France) Bourges	68–57	73–84	53–56

== Final four ==
- Messina, Italy

Semi-finals
20 April
(Czech Republic) Gambrinus Brno	45
(France) Valenciennes	65
20 April
(Hungary) Pécsi	52
(France) Bourges	62

Final
22 April
(France) Valenciennes	71
(France) Bourges	73
Third place
22 April
(Czech Republic) Brno	58
(Hungary) Pécsi	66
