= Fenerbahçe Women Euroleague 2008–09 =

The 2008-09 season was the 18th edition of Europe's premier basketball tournament for women since it was rebranded to its current format. It was won once again for the third time in a row by Spartak Moscow after defeating 2003 champions UMMC Ekaterimburg and first time finalists Perfumerías Avenida Salamanca in the final four, which took place in the latter's court.

== Group stage ==
=== Group D ===
	Team	Pld	W	L	PF	PA
1.	(Russia) Spartak Moscow	10	9	1	887	609
2.	(Turkey) Fenerbahçe Istanbul	10	6	4	717	761
3.	(Slovakia) Maxima Broker Košice	10	6	4	698	735
4.	(Lithuania) TEO Vilnius	10	5	5	664	673
5.	(Italy) Beretta Famila Schio	10	3	7	692	743
6.	(France) Basket Lattes MA	10	1	9	667	804

== Knockout stage ==
=== Round of 16 ===
Team #1	Agg.	Team #2	1st leg	2nd leg	3rd leg^{*}
UMMC Ekaterinburg (Russia)	2 - 0	(Lithuania) TEO Vilnius	91 - 61	69 - 46	
Fenerbahçe Istanbul (Turkey)	2 - 1	(Poland) Lotos PKO BP Gdynia	87 - 83	60 - 63	79 - 76

=== Round of 8 ===
Team #1	Agg.	Team #2	1st leg	2nd leg	3rd leg^{*}
UMMC Ekaterinburg (Russia)	2 - 0	(Turkey) Fenerbahçe Istanbul	94 - 62	70 - 68	

- if necessary
