= 2022 FIBA Europe SuperCup Women =

Tournament details
- Arena: Palais des sports du Prado; Bourges, France
- Dates: 18 October 2022

Final positions
- Champions: (France) Tango Bourges Basket
- Runners-up: (Hungary) Sopron Basket

The 2022 FIBA Europe SuperCup Women is set to be the 11th edition of the FIBA Europe SuperCup Women. It will be held on 18 October 2022 at the Palais des sports du Prado in Bourges, France.

== Final ==
18 October 2022
20:00 (UTC+2)

Boxscore

Tango Bourges Basket (France)	65–44	(Hungary) Sopron Basket
Scoring by quarter: 15–11, 14–15, 14–8, 22–10
Pts: Alexander 26; Rebs: Alexander 11; Asts: Guapo 4		Pts: Sykes 10; Rebs: Magbegor 6 Asts: Sykes 4

Palais des sports du Prado, Bourges
Attendance: 4,000
Referees: Özlem Yalman (TUR), Ariadna Chueca (FIN), Paulina Gajdosz (POL)
