= Miriam Forasté =

Spanish basketball player

Ros Casares Valencia
- Position: Small forward / Power forward
- League: Liga Femenina de Baloncesto; Euroleague Women

Personal information
- Born: 1 March 1991 (age 35) Barcelona, Spain
- Listed height: 1.90 m (6 ft 3 in)

Miriam Forasté (born 1 March 1991) is a Spanish women's basketball player currently playing for Ros Casares Valencia in Euroleague Women and Spain's Liga Femenina.

She started playing basketball at Lluisos de Gracia. Forasté has represented Spain's junior national teams at several youth competitions.
