= Pécs 2010 =

- Nickname: Vasút
- Leagues: NB I/A; EuroLeague Women
- Founded: 1946
- Dissolved: 2012
- Arena: Lauber Dezső Sportcsarnok
- Location: Pécs, Hungary
- Team colors: black and white
- Championships: 11 Hungarian Championships; 11 Hungarian Cups
- Website: pecsbasketball.hu
Home	Away

Pécs 2010 is a defunct women's professional Basketball team based in Pécs, Hungary. It used to play in the NB I/A, the top division championship in the country and in EuroLeague Women from its foundation until 2011. The club ceased to exist in the summer of 2012 due to financial reasons. However, two other clubs were founded in the city, that took over the players, coaches and managers of Pécs 2010. These two new clubs are PEAC-Pécs and PINKK-Pécsi 424; they are competing in the NB I/A.

== History ==
=== Club names ===
- Pécsi VSK
- PVSK-Co-Order
- PVSK-Dália
- PVSK-MiZo
- MiZo-Pécsi VSK
- MiZo Pécs
- MiZo Pécs 2010
- Pécs 2010

== Honours ==
International

- EuroLeague Bronze: 2001, 2004
- EuroLeague 4th: 2005

National

- National Championship: 11 (1991–92, 1994–95, 1995–96, 1997–98, 1999–2000, 2000–01, 2002–03, 2003–04, 2004–05, 2005–06, 2009–10)
- Hungarian Cup: 11 (1997, 1998, 1999, 2000, 2001, 2002, 2003, 2005, 2006, 2009, 2010)

== International history ==
Year	Competition	Name	Win/lose	Place (against)
1992	Ronchetti Cup	PVSK	4/6	group
1993	Euroleague Women	PVSK-Co-Order	2/12	group
1995	Ronchetti Cup	PVSK-Dália	8/4	group
1996	Euroleague Women	PVSK-Dália	1/1	2. round (Elitzur Cellcom (Israel) )
1997	EuroLeague Women	PVSK-Dália	5/9	group (best 16)
1998	EuroLeague Women	PVSK-Dália-Dalmand Rt.	5/9	group (best 16)
1999	EuroLeague Women	PVSK-MiZo	5/9	group (best 16)
2000	EuroLeague Women	MiZo-Pécsi VSK	9/8	quarter-final (CJM Bourges Basket (France) )
2001	EuroLeague Women	MiZo-Pécsi VSK	15/1	(semi-final: CJM Bourges Basket (France) )
2002	EuroLeague Women	MiZo-Pécsi VSK	10/7	quarter-final (US Valenciennes Olympic (France) )
2003	EuroLeague Women	MiZo-Pécsi VSK	11/6	quarter-final (CJM Bourges Basket (France) )
2004	EuroLeague Women	MiZo-Pécsi VSK	12/6	(semi-final: US Valenciennes Olympic (France) )
2005	EuroLeague Women	MiZo-Pécsi VSK	15/5	4. (semi-final: Gambrinus Brno (Czech Republic) )
2006	EuroLeague Women	MiZo Pécs	12/4	quarter-final (Lietuvos Telekomas Vilnius (Lithuania) )
2007	EuroLeague Women	MiZo Pécs	7/6	eighth-final (Gambrinus Brno (Czech Republic) )
2008	EuroLeague Women	MiZo Pécs 2010	7/6	eighth-final (Gambrinus Brno (Czech Republic) )
2009	EuroLeague Women	MiZo Pécs 2010	7/7	quarter-final (Perfumerías Avenida (Spain) )
2010	EuroLeague Women	MiZo Pécs 2010	5/8	eighth-final (TS Wisła Can-Pack Kraków (Poland) )
2011	EuroLeague Women	Pécs 2010	5/7	eighth-final (Perfumerías Avenida (Spain) )

== Last (2011-12) roster ==
PÉCS 2010 roster
Players
Coaches

Pos.	No.	Nat.	Name	Ht.	Wt.	Age
G/F	4	(Hungary)	Balla, Dorottya	1.78 m (5 ft 10 in)	63 kg (139 lb)	32 – 2 April 1994
G	5	(Hungary)	Raksányi, Krisztina	1.80 m (5 ft 11 in)	72 kg (159 lb)	34 – 26 September 1991
G/F	6	(Hungary)	Csutorás, Fanni	1.79 m (5 ft 10 in)	65 kg (143 lb)	31 – 17 November 1994
PG	7	(Hungary)	Török, Szilvia	1.73 m (5 ft 8 in)	66 kg (146 lb)	44 – 28 August 1981
G/F	9	(Hungary)	Sarok, Nikolett	1.80 m (5 ft 11 in)	72 kg (159 lb)	36 – 17 April 1990
PF	12	(Hungary)	Horváth, Lilla	1.83 m (6 ft 0 in)	72 kg (159 lb)	35 – 4 December 1990
G/F	14	(United States)	Quigley, Alexandria	1.80 m (5 ft 11 in)	62 kg (137 lb)	39 – 20 June 1986
SF	15	(Hungary)	Laczi, Edit	1.79 m (5 ft 10 in)	63 kg (139 lb)	38 – 7 March 1988
SF	23	(Hungary)	Végh, Patrícia	1.79 m (5 ft 10 in)	68 kg (150 lb)	34 – 19 February 1992
C	25	(Hungary)	Szamosi, Amadea	1.88 m (6 ft 2 in)	66 kg (146 lb)	32 – 1 February 1994
SG	31	(Hungary)	Pénzes, Kinga	1.75 m (5 ft 9 in)	60 kg (132 lb)	43 – 4 March 1983
C	32	(United States)	Murphy, Stefanie Lynn	1.94 m (6 ft 4 in)		37 – 4 May 1989

Head coach

- (Serbia) Zeljko Djokic

Assistant coach(es)

- (Hungary) Ajtony Imreh

Legend

- (C) Team captain
- Injured

== Notable players ==
Allie Quigley, Krisztina Raksányi, Stefanie Lynn Murphy, Sara Krnjić, Dalma Iványi, Zsófia Fegyverneky, Nóra Nagy-Bujdosó, Anna Vajda, Kelly Mazzante, Nicole Ohlde, Jennifer Whittle, Tijana Krivacevic, Simone Edwards, Vickie Johnson, Ekaterina Lisina, Svetlana Boiko, Albena Branzova, Allison Tranquilli, Andrea Károlyi, Eszter Ujvári, Érika de Souza, Slobodanka Tuvic, Magdolna Csák, Maria Stepanova, Jolanta Vilutyté, Éva Sztojkovics, Hajnalka Balázs, Sandra Mandir

=== Retired number ===
- 11 Judit Horváth

== Famous coaches ==
- László Rátgéber (1993–2008)
