= Laia Palau =

Spanish basketball player

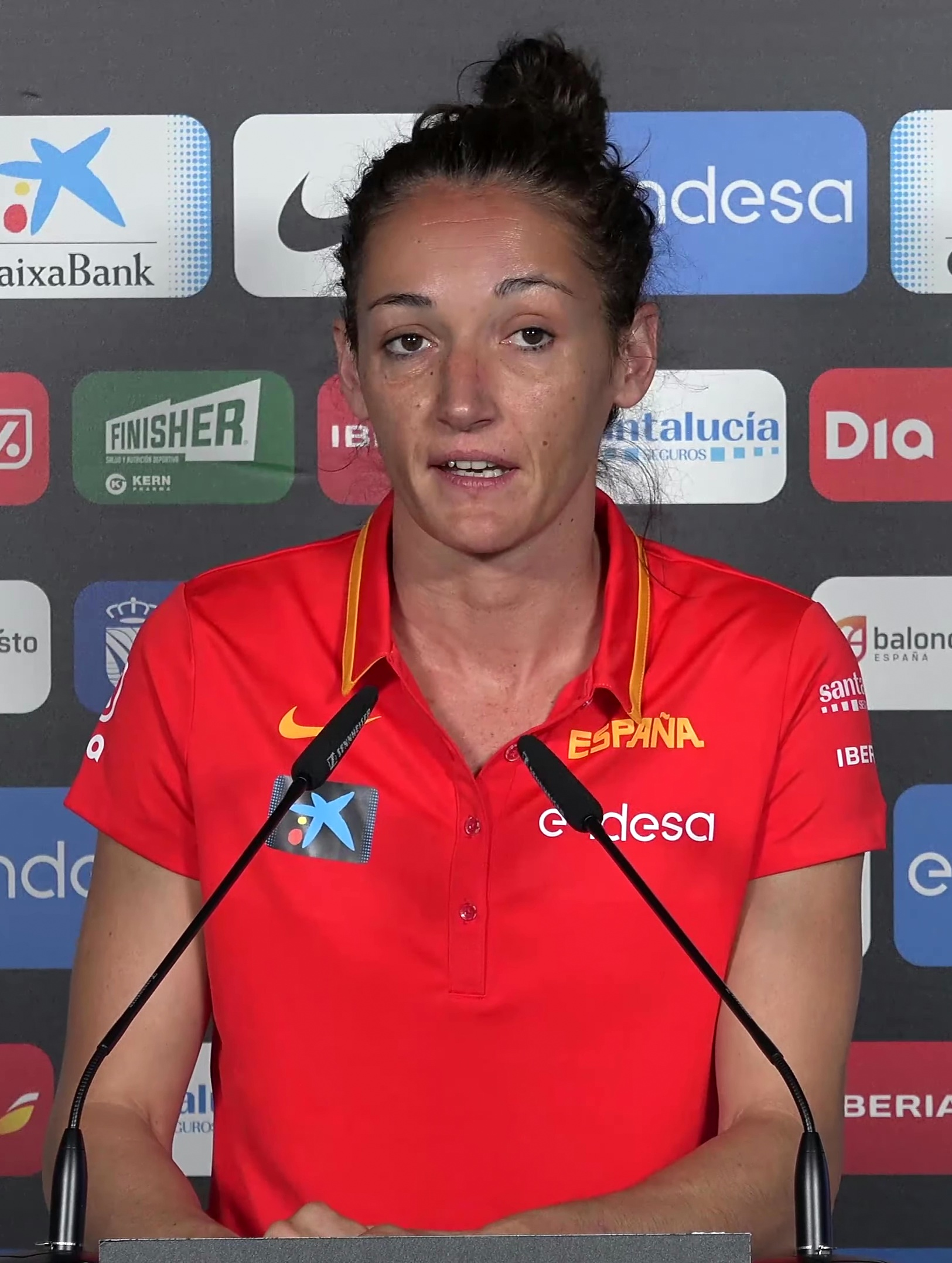

No. 3 – Spar CityLift Girona
- Position: Point guard
- League: Liga Día

Personal information
- Born: 10 September 1979 (age 47) Barcelona, Spain
- Listed height: 5 ft 10 in (1.78 m)
- Listed weight: 152 lb (69 kg)

Career information
- College: University of Barcelona
- Playing career: 1997–2022

Career history
- 1997–2004: Universitari de Barcelona
- 2004–2006: Bourges Basket
- 2006–2012: Ros Casares Valencia
- 2012–2013: CCC Polkowice
- 2013–2017: USK Praha
- 2017: Jayco Rangers
- 2018: Bourges Basket
- 2018-2022: Spar CityLift Girona

Career highlights
- 2× EuroLeague champion (2012, 2015); 7× Spanish League champion (2003, 2007–10, 2012, 2019); 5× Spanish Cup champion (2007–10, 2021); 2× French League champion (2006, 2018); 3× French Cup champion (2005, 2006, 2018); Polish League champion (2013); Polish Cup champion (2013); 4× Czech League champion (2014–17); 2× Czech Cup champion (2014, 2015)

Laia Palau Altés (born 10 September 1979) is a Spanish former professional basketball player. At 314, she is the most capped player in the Spain women's national basketball team, after being in the senior team for two decades (2002-2021). With 12 medals in final tournaments, she is also the top medallist.

== Club career ==
Palau began her professional career with Universitari de Barcelona in 1997, and continued to play with CBF Universitari de Barcelona through 2004, winning one league title. In 2004, she joined Bourges Basket, and played with them through 2006, winning 1 league and 2 French cups.

Back in Spain, she played for Ros Casares Valencia between 2006 and 2012, winning 5 league titles, 4 cups and the 2011–12 EuroLeague Women. After the club's decision not to play in top tier any more, in PLKK season 2012/13, she joined CCC Polkowice and won Championship's title and Polish Cup as well. With CCC she participated in EuroLeague Women 2012–13 reaching Final Eight and ranked #1 overall in Assists (6.4), #2 overall in Turnovers (3.8) and #2 overall in Minutes (36.2).

From 2013 to 2017 she played for USK Praha with whom she won the 2014–15 EuroLeague Women, 4 leagues and 2 cups. In 2017, after 20 years playing professionally in Europe, she signed for Australian team Jayco Rangers. In January 2018 she signed for EuroLeague French team Bourges Basket, winning both French League and French Cup. Back in Spain, she signed for Spar CityLift Girona, winning the 2019 league and the 2021 cup.

=== EuroLeague statistics ===
Euroleague winner

Season	Team	GP	MPP	PPP	RPP	APP
2003–04	(Spain) Universitari de Barcelona	14	27.9	10.6	4.7	3.9
2004–05	(France) Bourges Basket	17	30.6	13.5	3.6	3.4
2005–06	(France) Bourges Basket	15	30.7	12.9	3.5	4.0
2006–07	(Spain) Ros Casares Valencia	17	27.1	6.4	2.8	3.2
2007–08	(Spain) Ros Casares Valencia	16	24.9	6.9	2.9	3.5
2008–09	(Spain) Ros Casares Valencia	14	16.9	3.4	1.6	2.1
2009–10	(Spain) Ros Casares Valencia	16	23.9	6.9	2.6	2.8
2010–11	(Spain) Ros Casares Valencia	15	22.3	5.9	3.6	3.2
2011–12	(Spain) Ros Casares Valencia	19	24.3	6.5	3.5	5.6
2012–13	(Poland) CCC Polkowice	17	36.2	7.6	5.1	6.4
2013–14	(Czech Republic) USK Praha	18	35.2	6.7	5.3	6.8
2014–15	(Czech Republic) USK Praha	16	34.9	8.6	5.1	7.1
2015–16	(Czech Republic) USK Praha	18	32.3	7.4	4.9	7.1
2016–17	(Czech Republic) USK Praha	19	32.2	5.1	3.6	7.8
2017–18	(France) Bourges Basket	6	25.2	7.2	3.3	4.8
2019–20	(Spain) Spar CityLift Girona	14	28.0	4.4	2.9	4.5
2020-21	(Spain) Spar CityLift Girona	9	20.8	4.3	1.9	4.7
TOTAL		260	28.3	7.0	3.3	3.7

=== EuroCup statistics ===
Season	Team	GP	MPP	PPP	RPP	APP
2018–19	(Spain) Spar CityLift Girona	14	28.3	7.2	3.1	6.0
2019–20	(Spain) Spar CityLift Girona					

== National team ==
She made her debut with Spain women's national basketball team at the age of 22. She played with the senior team from 2002 until her retirement in 2021. She is the most capped player in the Spain national team with a total of 314 caps and with 5.9 PPG. She participated in 4 Olympic Games, 5 World Championships and in 10 European Championships:

- 4th 1995 FIBA Europe Under-16 Championship (youth)
- 8th 1997 FIBA Under-19 World Championship (youth)
- 5th 2002 World Championship
- 2003 Eurobasket
- 6th 2004 Summer Olympics
- 2005 Eurobasket
- 8th 2006 World Championship
- 2007 Eurobasket
- 5th 2008 Summer Olympics
- 2009 Eurobasket
- 2010 World Championship
- 9th 2011 Eurobasket
- 2013 Eurobasket
- 2014 World Championship
- 2015 Eurobasket
- 2016 Summer Olympics
- 2017 Eurobasket
- 2018 World Championship
- 2019 Eurobasket
- 7th 2021 Eurobasket
- 6th 2020 Summer Olympics
