= Ligue Féminine de Basketball =

La Boulangère Wonderligue
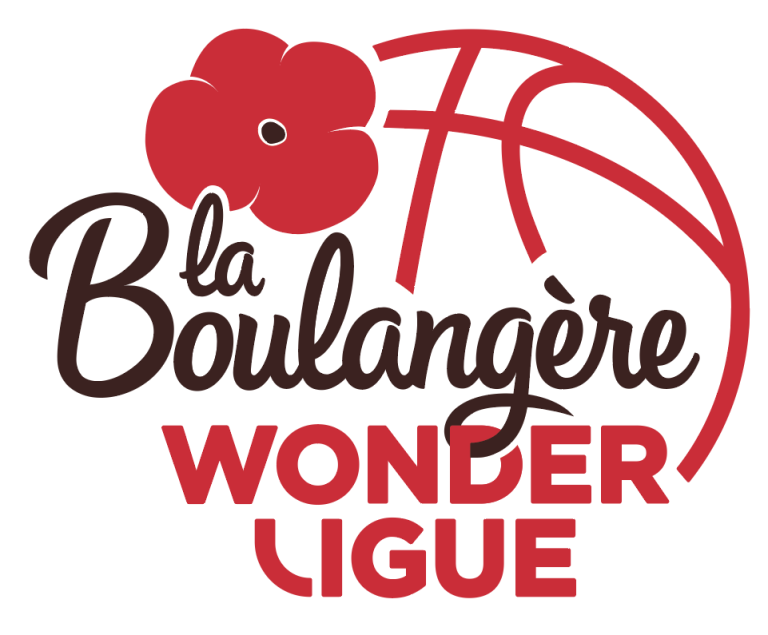
- Formerly: Nationale féminine 1A (NF1A)
- Founded: 1998
- Country: France
- Confederation: FIBA Europe (Europe)
- Number of teams: 12
- Level on pyramid: 1
- Domestic cup: Coupe de France
- Supercup: Match des Champions
- Current champions: Villeneuve-d’Ascq (1st title)
- Most championships: Bourges (11 titles)
- TV partners: Sport en France
- Website: basketlfb.com
- 2025–26 Ligue Féminine de Basketball

The Ligue Féminine de Basketball (LFB; Women's Basketball League) is the top women's French professional basketball league. The LFB authorities announced that the championship is renamed La Boulangère Wonderligue (LBWL) as for the seasons 2024–2025 to 2026–2027.

== Current teams ==
Location of teams within France

Team	City	Arena	capacity	Colours
Angers	Angers	Jean Bouin	3,000	
Basket Landes	Mont-de-Marsan	Salle Francois Mitterrand	3,000	
Bourges	Bourges	Palais des Sports du Prado	3,100	
Flammes Carolo	Charleville-Mézières	L'Arena	2,960	
Charnay	Charnay-lès-Mâcon	The Cosec	700	
Chartres	Chartres	Le Colisée	4,186	
Landerneau	Landerneau	La Cimenterie	2,300	
Lattes Montpellier	Lattes	Palais des sports de Lattes	1,100	
Lyon	Lyon	Palais des sports de Lyon	3,000	
Roche Vendee	La Roche-sur-Yon	Salle des Oudairies	2,500	
Toulouse	Toulouse	Gymnase Compans-Caffarelli	1,900	
Villeneuve d'Ascq	Villeneuve-d'Ascq	Le Palacium	1,800	

== Champions ==
Season	Champions	Finalists	Game 1	Game 2	Game 3	Game 4	Game 5	Series
1998–1999	Bourges	Valenciennes	59–*71	*54–36	*87–52			2–1
1999–2000	Bourges	Valenciennes	*65–60 (OT)	62–*57	–			2–0
2000–2001	Valenciennes	Bourges	*63–62	81–*71 (OT)	–			2–0
2001–2002	Valenciennes	Bourges	*77–51	72–*62	–			2–0
2002–2003	Valenciennes	Tarbes	*88–59	71-*55	–			2–0
2003–2004	Valenciennes	Bourges	58–*52	*79–56	–			2–0
2004–2005	Valenciennes	Bourges	*63–57	54–*47	59–*55			3–0
2005–2006	Bourges	Valenciennes	*68–56	66–*85	71–*58			2–1
2006–2007	Valenciennes	Bourges	64–*55	*70–61	–			2–0
2007–2008	Bourges	Lattes Montpellier	58–*56 (OT)	*52–45	–			2–0
2008–2009	Bourges	Tarbes	47–*55	*78–37	*72–52			2–1
2009–2010	Tarbes GB	Bourges	76–*73	*54–40	–			2–0
2010–2011	Bourges	Tarbes	71–*53	*71–59	–			2–0
2011–2012	Bourges	Lattes Montpellier	59–*47	*53–45	–			2–0
2012–2013	Bourges	Lattes Montpellier	*54–62	60–*53	64–*54			2–1
2013–2014	Lattes Montpellier	Bourges	*63–54	53–*55	50–*44			2–1
2014–2015	Bourges	Villeneuve-d’Ascq	51–*61	*63–55	*51–49			2–1
2015–2016	Lattes Montpellier	Bourges	49–*54	*61–51	*65–63			2–1
2016–2017	Villeneuve-d’Ascq	Lattes Montpellier	79–*64	62-*64	*80–60	*66–49		3–1
2017–2018	Bourges	Tarbes GB	*86–66	*80–56	63–*64 (OT)	87–*80		3–1
2018–2019	Lyon	Lattes Montpellier	*71–60	*77–69	61–*72	85–*91	*75–61	3–2
2019–2020	Canceled due to the COVID-19 pandemic in France							
2020–2021	Basket Landes	Lattes Montpellier	72–64	–	–	–	–	1–0
2021–2022	Bourges	Lyon	*76–66	*78–62	59–53*	–	–	3–0
2022–2023	Lyon	Villeneuve-d’Ascq	56–*67	*85–72	*74–68	–	–	2–1
2023–2024	Villeneuve-d’Ascq	Basket Landes	70–*66	–	*114–88	–	–	2–0
2024–2025	Basket Landes	Tarbes GB	51–*56	*51–44	*84–51	–	–	2–1

* precedes the score of the team playing at home.

=== Performance by club ===
Club	Winners	Winning years
Bourges	11	1999, 2000, 2006, 2008, 2009, 2011, 2012, 2013, 2015, 2018, 2022
Valenciennes	6	2001, 2002, 2003, 2004, 2005, 2007
Basket Landes	2	2021, 2025
Villeneuve d'Ascq	2	2017, 2024
Lyon	2	2019, 2023
Lattes Montpellier	2	2014, 2016
Tarbes	1	2010

== Former LFB clubs ==
- US Valenciennes Olympic
- RC Strasbourg (1998–2000, 2004–2006),
- Toulouse-Launaguet Basket (1998–1999, 2002–2004),
- Limoges ABC (1999–2000)
- Évolution Roubaix (2003–2004)
- W Bordeaux Basket (1997–2003)
- Saint-Jacques Sports Reims
- ASA Sceaux Basket Féminin
- Istres Sports BC (2000–2001)
- Avenir de Rennes (1998–1999)
- Rezé-Nantes Basket 44
- USO Mondeville
- Pays d'Aix Basket 13

== Broadcaster ==
The Ligue Féminine de Basketball is currently broadcast on the YouTube channel of the FFBB. The playoffs of the 2021–22 season were also broadcast on the TV channel Sport en France.
