= Szeged KE =

Szeged KE, also known as Abcom Szeged or Szeviép Szeged for sponsorship reasons, was a Hungarian women's basketball club from Szeged that played in the premier championship until it withdrew due to financial strain in 2011. Usually ranking third in the championship between 2005 and 2010, it played the 2010 Euroleague and it was a regular in the FIBA Eurocup.
