= Sopron Basket =

- Leagues: NB I/A; EuroCup Women
- Founded: 1921
- History: Soproni VSE (1986–1993); GYSEV-Sopron (1993–2002); Orsi-Sopron (2002–2004); MKB-Euroleasing Sopron (2004–2011); Uniqa-Euroleasing Sopron (2011–2015); Uniqa Sopron (2015–2017); Sopron Basket (2017–present)
- Arena: Aréna Sopron
- Capacity: 2,500
- Location: Sopron, Hungary
- Team colors: Green and yellow
- President: Zoltán Török
- Head coach: Dávid Gáspár
- Championships: 1 EuroLeague; 1 Ronchetti Cup; 15 Hungarian Leagues; 10 Hungarian Cups
- Website: Official website
Home	Away

Sopron Basket is a Hungarian professional women's basketball club from Sopron. Founded in 1921 as the women's section of Soproni VSE, it has played in the Hungarian National Championship since 1986. It plays its home games in the Aréna Sopron. Sopron won its first-ever EuroLeague championship in 2022.

Sopron won its first national championship in 1993, making its debut in the Euroleague the following season. Settled in the top positions, the team played in subsequent years the Ronchetti Cup, which it won in 1998 beating ASPTT Aix-en-Provence. As of 2011 Sopron remains the only Hungarian women's basketball team that has won an international competition since the fall of communism. The following year Sopron won its second championship, which marked its return to the Euroleague, which it has played every year since.

The team has won four more championships since 2002, three of them between 2007 and 2011. In 2009 it reached the Euroleague's Final Four after beating Wisła Kraków and Bourges Basket in the knockout stages, ending 4th after losing to CB Avenida and UMMC Ekaterinburg.

== Honours ==
=== Titles ===
- 1 EuroLeague Women (2021–22)
- 1 Ronchetti Cup (1998)
- 15 Hungarian Leagues (1993, 1999, 2002, 2007, 2008, 2009, 2011, 2013, 2015, 2016, 2017, 2018, 2019, 2021, 2022, 2023)
- 10 Hungarian Cups (2007, 2008, 2011, 2012, 2013, 2015, 2017, 2019, 2020, 2021,2023,2024)

=== Record in European competitions ===
- EuroLeague
  - 1994: 1st Preliminary Round
  - 2000: Quarter-Finals
  - 2001: Quarter-Finals
  - 2002: Quarter-Finals
  - 2003: Quarter-Finals
  - 2004: Round of 16
  - 2005: Round of 16
  - 2006: Quarter-Finals
  - 2007: Quarter-Finals
  - 2008: Round of 16
  - 2009: 4th
  - 2010: Group Stage (4/6)
  - 2011: Round of 16
  - 2012: Group Stage (4/8)
  - 2013: Group Stage (3/9)
  - 2014: Round of 16
  - 2016: Group Stage (1/13)
  - 2017: Group Stage (4/10)
  - 2018: Runners-up
  - 2019: 4th
  - 2020: Group Stage (6/8)
  - 2021: 4th
  - 2022: Champion
  - 2023: Quarter-Finals
- Ronchetti Cup
  - 1995: Group Stage (4/4)
  - 1996: 3rd Preliminary Round
  - 1997: Quarter-Finals
  - 1998: Champion
  - 1999: Quarter-Finals

== Current players ==
=== Roster ===
Note: Flags indicate national team eligibility at FIBA-sanctioned events. Players may hold other non-FIBA nationalities not displayed.

Sopron Basket roster
Players
Coaches

Pos.	No.	Nat.	Name	Ht.	Age
PG	0	(France)	Époupa, Olivia	1.65 m (5 ft 5 in)	31 – 30 April 1994
F	1	(Australia)	Kunek, Alice	1.87 m (6 ft 2 in)	35 – 6 January 1991
PG	4	(Hungary)	Fegyverneky, Zsófia	1.78 m (5 ft 10 in)	41 – 29 September 1984
F/C	5	(Australia)	Magbegor, Ezi	1.93 m (6 ft 4 in)	26 – 13 August 1999
F	8	(Hungary)	Varga, Alíz	1.86 m (6 ft 1 in)	24 – 17 March 2001
C	10	(Serbia)	Stanković, Dragana	1.95 m (6 ft 5 in)	30 – 18 January 1995
G/F	13	(Hungary)	Czukor, Dalma	1.82 m (6 ft 0 in)	26 – 29 March 1999
C	14	(Hungary)	Határ, Bernadett	2.08 m (6 ft 10 in)	31 – 24 August 1994
F	15	(Hungary)	Sitku, Zsuzsanna	1.88 m (6 ft 2 in)	22 – 7 November 2003
G/F	23	(Slovakia)	Erdelyiova, Alexandra	1.76 m (5 ft 9 in)	21 – 25 September 2004
PF	32	(Serbia)	Brooks, Jelena	1.90 m (6 ft 3 in)	36 – 28 April 1989
PG	42	(United States)	Turner, Yvonne	1.78 m (5 ft 10 in)	38 – 13 October 1987
SG	44	(Hungary)	Borondy, Vivien	1.75 m (5 ft 9 in)	31 – 10 January 1995
SG	66	(Hungary)	Völgyi, Lili	1.70 m (5 ft 7 in)	18 – 28 March 2007

Head coach

- (Hungary) Dávid Gáspár

Assistant coach(es)

- (Serbia) Stevan Karadžić
- (Hungary) Miklós Laczka

Legend

- (C) Team captain
- Injured

Pos.	Starting 5	Bench 1	Bench 2
C	Ezi Magbegor	Dragana Stanković	Bernadett Határ
PF	Jelena Brooks	Zsuzsanna Sitku
SF	Alice Kunek	Yvonne Turner	Alexandra Erdelyiova
SG	Alíz Varga	Dalma Czukor	Lili Völgyi
PG	Zsófia Fegyverneky	Vivien Borondy	Olivia Époupa
