= CSKA Samara =

- Founded: 2002
- Arena: MTL Arena
- Location: Samara, Russia
- Championships: 1 Euroleague Women

CSKA Samara is a Russian women's basketball team from Samara, Russia, founded in 2002. CSKA Samara has won Euroleague Women in the 2004–05 season and 3 Russian Championships.

== Titles ==
- 1 Euroleague Women (2005)
- 3 Russian Championships (2004, 2005, 2006)

== See also ==
- WBC CSKA Moscow
