= USO Mondeville =

French basketball club

USO Mondeville Basket
- Leagues: Ligue Féminine
- Founded: 1971; 54 years ago
- Arena: Halle Bérégovoy
- Location: Mondeville, France
- Team colors: Red
- President: Olivier Liberge
- Head coach: Morgan Debrosse
- Website: mondevillebasket.com
Home	Away

Union Sportive Ouvrière Mondeville Basket is a French women's basketball club from Mondeville playing in the Ligue Féminine de Basketball.

Founded in 1971, Mondeville won the national cup in 1995 and 1999. It has played the Euroleague in 2006, 2007, 2008 and 2011, reaching the Round of 16 in its two first appearances. It has also played the Ronchetti Cup and the Eurocup, reaching the quarterfinals in four occasions.

== Titles ==
- French Cup
  - 1995, 1999

== 2011-12 Squad ==
- (1.92) (Lithuania) Giedre Paugaite
- (1.91) (Senegal) Naignouma Coulibaly
- (1.91) (Lithuania) Egle Sulciute
- (1.87) (France) Laetitita Kamba
- (1.86) (France) Hhadydia Minte
- (1.84) (Hungary) Anna Vida
- (1.78) (Czech Republic) Kateřina Zohnová
- (1.75) (United States) Kristen B. Sharp
- (1.69) (France) Touty Gandega
- (1.64) (France) Ingrid Tanqueray
