= UMMC Ekaterinburg =

- Nickname: Fox
- Leagues: Premier League; ~~EuroLeague Women~~ (suspended)
- Founded: 1938
- History: Zenit (1938–1958); Trud (1958–1960); Uralmash (1960–2000); Uralmash-UMMC (2000–2001); UMMC (2001–present)
- Arena: Palace of Sporting Games
- Capacity: 5,000
- Location: Yekaterinburg, Russia
- President: Andrei Kozitsyn
- Head coach: Dmitrii Donskov
- Championships: 18 Russian Championship: 2002, 2003, 2009, 2010, 2011, 2012, 2013, 2014, 2015, 2016, 2017, 2018, 2019, 2020, 2021, 2023, 2024, 2025, 2026; 12 Russian Cups: 2005, 2009, 2010, 2011, 2012, 2013, 2014, 2017, 2019, 2023, 2024, 2025; 6 EuroLeague Women: 2003, 2013, 2016, 2018, 2019, 2021
- Website: basket.ugmk.com
| Home | Away |

BC UMMC Ekaterinburg (Russian: БК «УГМК») is a Russian professional women's basketball team based in Yekaterinburg competing in the Russian Premier League, and until February 2022 in FIBA Europe's EuroLeague Women. Founded in 1938 as Zenit Sverdlovsk, the club had its name changed to Uralmash Sverdlovsk in 1960.

In reaction to the 2022 Russian invasion of Ukraine, in February 2022 EuroLeague Women suspended all Russian clubs including UMMC.

== History ==
=== Beginnings ===
Founded in 1938 as Zenit Sverdlovsk, the club had its name changed to Uralmash Sverdlovsk in 1960, like other teams from the city such as FC Ural Sverdlovsk Oblast. Four years later Uralmash reached the Soviet Top Division. In 1973 and 1974 it attained two 3rd spots, the club's best results in the Soviet era.

After the club's owner Uralmash was merged into the conglomerate OMZ, the club was bought in 2000 by the newly formed company Ural Mining and Metallurgical Company (UMMC), adopting its current name. UMMC Ekaterinburg in 2002 won its first national championship. The following year it won the Euroleague in its debut season, becoming the first Russian team to win the top European trophy. The team also defended its national title, making it a double.

UMMC wasn't able to win the championship in the following five seasons with the rise of VBM-SGAU Samara and Spartak Moscow Region. In 2009 it began a new successful period, winning three doubles in a row. Spartak ultimately blocked its path to the Euroleague final, defeating UMMC in the Final Four's semi-finals in all four seasons 2008–11.

=== Championships ===
Olaf Lange was head coach of UMMC Ekaterinburg for six years, during which time they had two FIBA EuroLeague titles.

American Olympian Brittney Griner began playing with Ekaterinburg in the WNBA offseason in 2014.

American Diana Taurasi of the WNBA played with the team for ten years. In February 2015, it was reported that Taurasi was resting for the summer and sitting out the 2015 WNBA season at the request of UMMC Ekaterinburg, and was paid a bonus by the Russian team larger than her WNBA salary just to rest. In 2015, Taurasi was reportedly paid US$1.5 million per season, significantly higher than the pay in the WNBA. She left the Ekaterinburg team at the end of 2017.

In 2016, UMMC Ekaterinburg won the EuroLeague championship, also winning the title in 2018, 2019, and 2021. Ekaterinburg won five EuroLeague titles between 2013 and 2021. By 2022, the team was owned by Iskander Makhmudov.

=== Russian invasion of Ukraine and loss of players ===
After the Russian invasion of Ukraine on February 24, 2022, American-Hungarians Courtney Vandersloot (who led the team in assists) and Allie Quigley (who was second on the team in points), Bahamian-Bosnian Jonquel Jones (who led the team in points and rebounds), and Spanish player Alba Torrens left the team.

Seven days earlier, on February 17, UMMC player and American two-time Olympic champion Brittney Griner was arrested on drug charges in Russia by the Russian Federal Security Service. Griner was detained while returning to Russia to play with UMMC Ekaterinburg. In July 2022, it was reported that Griner's team captain and club director had testified on her behalf during one of several hearings, testifying to her good character in a closed hearing along with player Evgenia Belyakova. From overseas, Taurasi praised the support. On August 4, 2022, Griner was sentenced to 9 years in prison. Ultimately, she was released on December 8 in a prisoner exchange for Russian arms dealer Viktor Bout, who had served 10 years of a 25-year sentence.

In reaction to the 2022 Russian invasion of Ukraine, in February 2022 EuroLeague Women suspended all Russian clubs, including UMMC.

== Titles ==
- 4 SuperCup (2013, 2016, 2018, 2019)
- 6 Euroleague (2003, 2013, 2016, 2018, 2019, 2021)
- 18 Russian Leagues (2002, 2003, 2009-21, 2023-26)
- 12 Russian Cups (2005, 2009-14, 2017, 2019, 2023, 2024, 2025)
- 5 Russian Super Cup (2021, 2022, 2023, 2024, 2025)
- 2 Triple Crown (2012–13, 2018-19)

== Roster ==
UMMC Ekaterinburg roster
Players
Coaches

| Pos. | No. | Nat. | Name | Ht. | Wt. | Age |
|---|---|---|---|---|---|---|
| PG | 1 | (Russia) | Tretyakova, Viktoriia | 1.70 m (5 ft 7 in) | | 27 – 16 October 1998 |
| F | 3 | (Russia) | Shilova, Anastasiia | 1.86 m (6 ft 1 in) | | 35 – 10 January 1991 |
| PG | 13 | (Russia) | Beglova, Elena | 1.75 m (5 ft 9 in) | | 38 – 1 September 1987 |
| F | 14 | (Russia) | Kosu, Anastasiia | 1.85 m (6 ft 1 in) | | 21 – 21 April 2005 |
| C | 7 | (Russia) | Klyundikova, Maria | 1.93 m (6 ft 4 in) | | 27 – 16 July 1998 |
| PG | 20 | (United States) | Bentley, Alexandria | 1.73 m (5 ft 8 in) | | 35 – 27 October 1990 |
| SF | 22 | (United States) | Walker, Megan | 1.85 m (6 ft 1 in) | | 27 – 23 November 1998 |
| C | 38 | (Slovenia) | Lisec, Eva | 1.93 m (6 ft 4 in) | | 30 – 17 June 1995 |
| PF | 31 | (Belarus) | Papova, Maryia | 1.89 m (6 ft 2 in) | | 31 – 13 July 1994 |
| C | 32 | (Russia) | Maiga, Zhosselina | 1.93 m (6 ft 4 in) | | 30 – 30 April 1996 |
| G | 17 | (Serbia) | Nogić, Jovana | 1.85 m (6 ft 1 in) | | 28 – 17 December 1997 |
| PG | 91 | (Russia) | Levchenko, Kseniia | 1.69 m (5 ft 7 in) | | 30 – 29 March 1996 |

Head coach

Dmitrii Donskov

Assistant coach(es)

- (Russia) Olga Korosteleva
- Denis Sevastjanov
- Alexandr Lisichkin

Legend

- (C) Team captain
- Injured

- Roster
Updated: 2024-10-28

== Former players ==
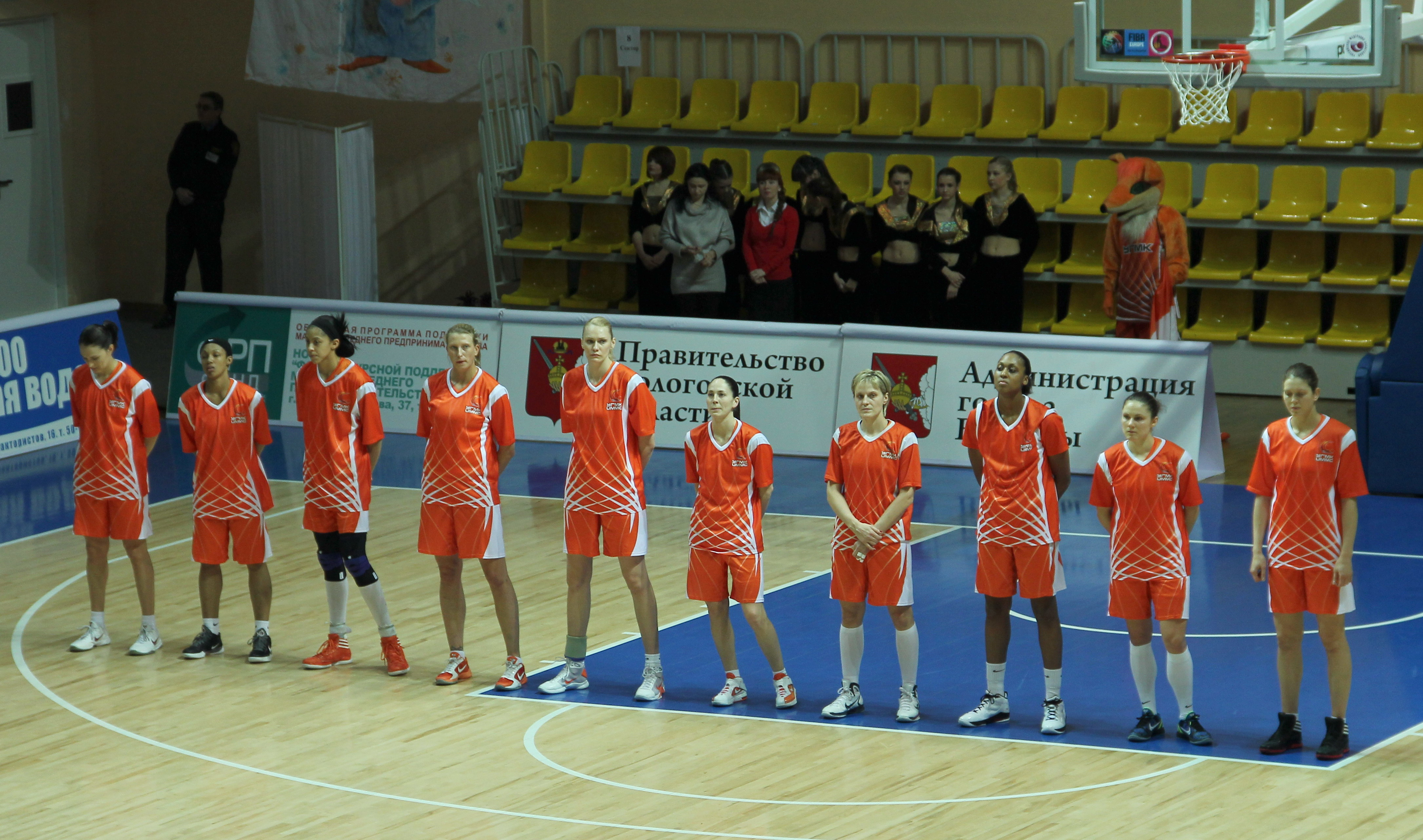
Basketball team in 2012

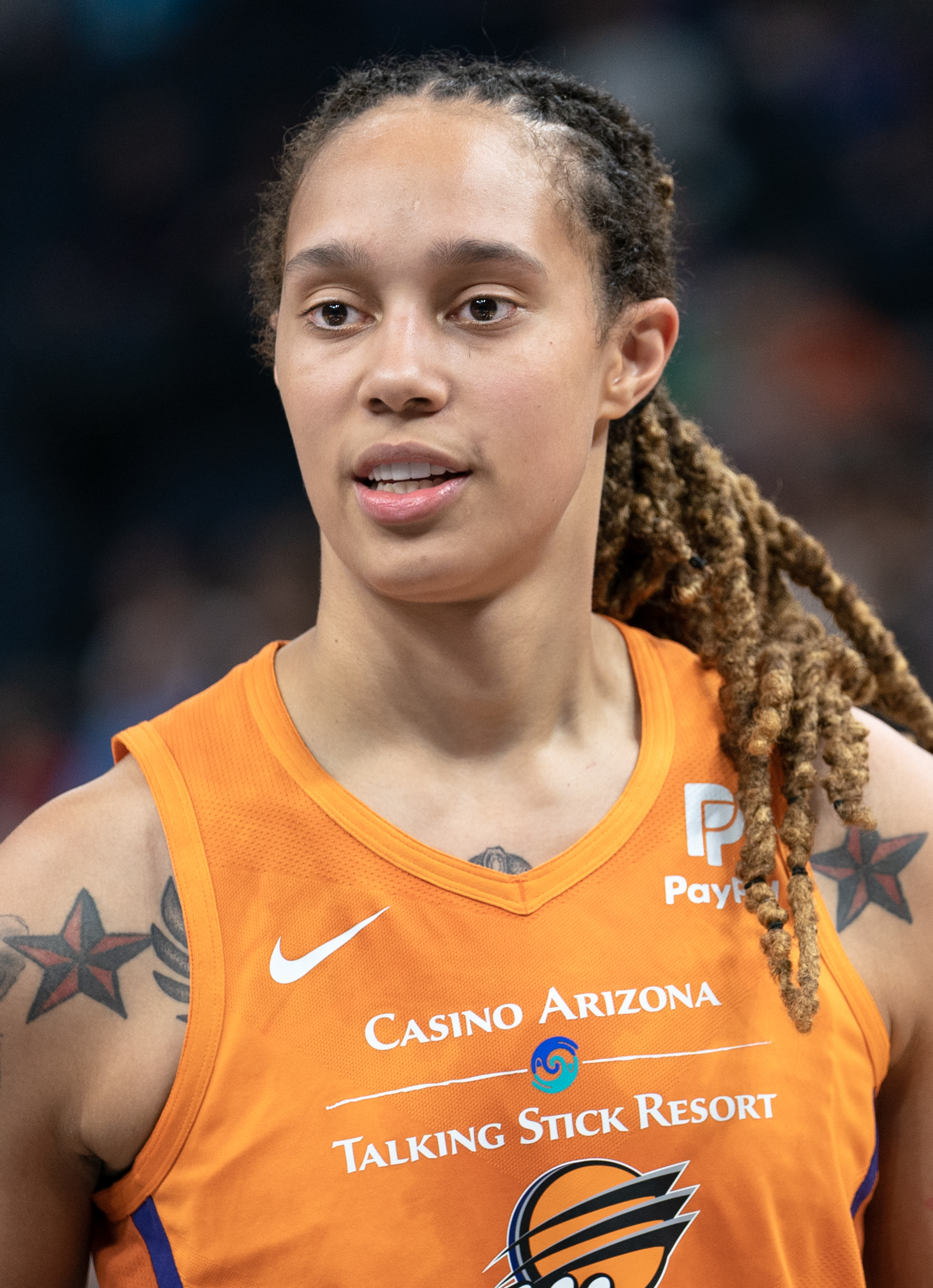
Brittney Griner

- (Australia) Suzy Batkovic-Brown
- (Australia) Penny Taylor
- (Belarus) Yelena Leuchanka
- (Belgium) Ann Wauters
- (Czech Republic) Hana Horáková
- (France) Céline Dumerc
- (France) Sandrine Gruda
- (France) Audrey Sauret
- (Poland) Małgorzata Dydek
- (Portugal) Ticha Penicheiro
- (Serbia) Tina Krajišnik
- (Spain) Sílvia Domínguez
- (Soviet Union) (Russia) Olga Korosteleva
- (Russia) Svetlana Abrosimova
- (Russia) Anna Arkhipova
- (Russia) Yelena Baranova
- (Russia) Diana Gustilina
- (Russia) Elena Karpova
- (Russia) Irina Osipova
- (Russia) Maria Stepanova
- (United States) / (Russia) Deanna Nolan
- (United States) Sue Bird
- (United States) Yolanda Griffith
- (United States) DeLisha Milton-Jones
- (United States) Maya Moore
- (United States) Candace Parker
- (United States) Cappie Pondexter
- (United States) Diana Taurasi
- (United States) Brittney Griner

== Former coaches ==
- (Serbia) Zoran Višić
