= Union Sportive Valenciennes Olympic =

US Valenciennes Olympic
- League: Ligue Féminine de Basketball
- Founded: 1923
- Folded: 2008
- Stadium: Salle du Hainaut (Capacity: 2,900)

US Valenciennes Olympic (or USVO, previously Union Sportive Valenciennes-Orchies) is a former French basketball team based in Valenciennes. It will be replaced by Union Hainaut Basket, because of the merging with Union Saint-Amand Porte du Hainaut (Saint-Amand-les-Eaux).

== Notable players ==
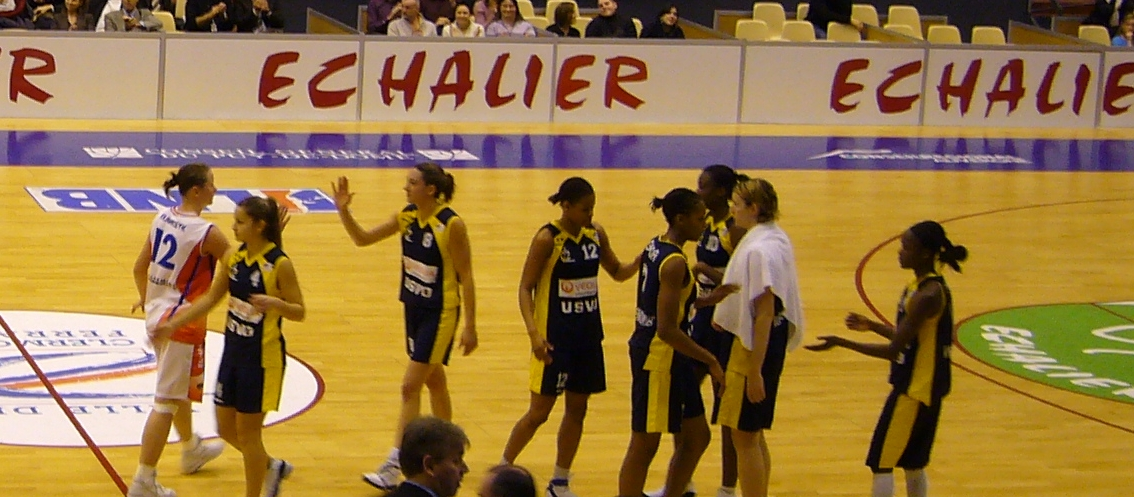
Squad in 2007.

- (France) Nicole Antibe
- (France) Isabelle Fijalkowski
- (France) Edwige Lawson-Wade
- (Lithuania) Jurgita Štreimikytė
- (United States) Teresa Edwards
