= Žabiny Brno =

- Leagues: ZBL
- Founded: 1993
- Arena: Rosnicka Sport Hall
- Location: Brno, Czech Republic
- Team colors
- Head coach: Viktor Pruša
- Championships: 1 EuroLeague: 2006; 14 Czech Leagues: 1996, 1997, 1998, 1999, 2000, 2001, 2002, 2003, 2004, 2005, 2006, 2007, 2008, 2010; 4 Czech Republic Cup: 2013, 2017, 2020, 2023; 1 EWBL: 2022
- Website: bkzabiny.cz

Basketbalový Klub Brno, currently officially Žabiny Brno, previously also known as Imos Brno for sponsorship reasons, is a Czech professional women's basketball club from Brno established in 1993, not to be mistaken with male club BC VS Brno.

Former club logo

== Team history ==
Žabiny Brno has been the most successful team in the Czech league following the dissolution of Czechoslovakia, dominating the championship between 1996 and 2008. The team has been Czech Republic D1 Champion in 1996, 1997, 1998, 1999, 2000, 2001, 2002, 2003, 2004, 2005, 2006, 2007, 2008, and 2010. BK Žabiny Brno has also been Czech Republic Cup winners in 2013, 2017, 2020, and 2023.

In European Cups, Žabiny Brno has also been highly successful, winning the Women's Euroleague in 2006 and winning the EWBL in 2022. In 2005 it reached the Euroleague final but lost to CSKA Moscow. In 2008 it again hosted and reached the final, but lost against defending champion Spartak Moscow Region.

== Players ==
=== Current roster ===
Note: Flags indicate national team eligibility at FIBA-sanctioned events. Players may hold other non-FIBA nationalities not displayed.

Zabiny Brno (ZBL) roster
Players
Coaches

Pos.	No.	Nat.	Name	Ht.
PG	1	(Czech Republic)	Zeithammerová, Kateřina	1.62 m (5 ft 4 in)
F	4	(Poland)	Piestryńska, Julia	1.82 m (6 ft 0 in)
F	7	(France)	Wadoux, Zoé	1.78 m (5 ft 10 in)
G	8	(Czech Republic)	Záplatová, Petra	1.75 m (5 ft 9 in)
PG	10	(Czech Republic)	Joklová, Eliška	1.82 m (6 ft 0 in)
G	11	(Czech Republic)	Hamzová, Marie	1.80 m (5 ft 11 in)
C	13	(Czech Republic)	Kalná, Kateřina	1.90 m (6 ft 3 in)
F	15	(Greece)	Spanou, Artemis	1.85 m (6 ft 1 in)
G	16	(Czech Republic)	Rychtecká, Ema	1.82 m (6 ft 0 in)
F	23	(United States)	Dickey, Sara	1.77 m (5 ft 10 in)
G	24	(Czech Republic)	Kytlicová, Aneta	1.75 m (5 ft 9 in)
C	30	(Slovenia)	Evans, Shante	1.85 m (6 ft 1 in)
C	42	(Sweden)	Zahui B., Amanda	1.93 m (6 ft 4 in)
F/C	55	(Czech Republic)	Sklenářová, Simona	1.81 m (5 ft 11 in)

Head coach

- (Czech Republic) Viktor Pruša

Assistant coach(es)

- (Czech Republic) Jan Bobrovsky
- (Slovakia) Michal Martišek

Legend

- (C) Team captain
- (DP) Development player
- (I) Import player
- Injured

- Roster
Updated: 7 October 2025

== Famous players ==
- (Czech Republic) Kamila Vodičková
- (Montenegro) Jelena Škerović
