= WBC Sparta&K =

WBC SpartaK
- Leagues: Russian Premier League
- Founded: 2005
- History: Spartak Moscow Region (2005–2009); ŽBK Vidnoe (2009–2010)
- Location: Moscow, Russia
- Team colors: Red and White
- Championships: 4 EuroLeague Women; 2 European SuperCup; 1 EuroCup Women; 2 Russian Premier League
- Website: http://www.wbcs.ru
Home	Away

Women's Basketball Club Sparta&K is a professional women's basketball team based in Vidnoye, Russia that plays in FIBA’s EuroLeague Women.

== History ==
It won the 2005–06 EuroCup Women and the 2006–07, 2007–08, 2008–09 and 2009–10 EuroLeague Women championship and two SuperCup Women. It is currently the only team that has won 4 consecutive EuroLeague Women titles since 1991 when European Cup For Women's Champions Clubs was rebranded as the Euroleague Women.

This is due in part to the team's supplementing of its otherwise Russian roster with seasoned WNBA American and other stars Lauren Jackson, Sue Bird, Diana Taurasi, Tamika Catchings, Anete Jēkabsone-Žogota, and others.

In 2010, the club was renamed to Sparta&K after the sports society Spartak were against the usage of the brand "Spartak" in December 2009. The last letter is devoted to murdered basketball sponsor Shabtai Kalmanovich.

== Winners ==
FIBA Europe SuperCup Women: (2)

- 2009, 2010

EuroLeague Women: (4)

- 2007, 2008, 2009, 2010

EuroCup Women: (1)

- 2006

Russian Women's Basketball Premier League: (2)

- 2007, 2008

== Former players ==
- (Russia) Marina Karpunina
- (Russia) Ilona Korstin
- (Russia) Marina Kuzina
- (Russia) Irina Osipova
- (Lithuania) Jurgita Štreimikytė-Virbickienė
- (United States) Seimone Augustus
- (United States) Sue Bird
- (United States) Tamika Catchings
- (United States) Candice Dupree
- (United States) Sylvia Fowles
- (United States) (Russia) Becky Hammon
- (United States) Janel McCarville
- (United States) (Russia) Epiphanny Prince
- (United States) Diana Taurasi
- (United States) Tina Thompson
- (Australia) Lauren Jackson
- (Belgium) Emma Meesseman
- (France) Isabelle Yacoubou
- (Latvia) Anete Jēkabsone-Žogota
- (Montenegro) Jelena Škerović
- (Slovenia) Nika Barič
- (Serbia) Tijana Ajduković
- (Serbia) Jelena Milovanović
- (Serbia) Sonja Petrović
- (Spain) Elisa Aguilar
