= Tango Bourges Basket =

Bourges
- Nickname: Les Tangos
- League: La Boulangère Wonderligue
- Founded: 1967
- Arena: Palais des sports du Prado (capacity: 5,019)
- Location: Bourges, France
- Team colors: Orange and Black
- President: (France) Agnès St-Gès
- Head coach: (France) Olivier Lafargue
- Championships: 7 French Cup
- Website: bourgesbasket.com
Home	Away

Tango Bourges Basket (formerly Cercle Jean-Macé Bourges Basket) is a French professional women's basketball club from Bourges.

Bourges was the first French team to win a FIBA women's competition, the 1995 Ronchetti Cup. So began the club's most successful years to date ranging between 1995 and 2001, with three Euroleagues and six national championships in a row. A regular in the Euroleague, since 2006 Bourges has won four more championships, most recently in 2013.

== Titles ==
- Euroleague
  - 1997, 1998, 2001
- Ronchetti Cup
  - 1995
- EuroCup Women
  - Winners (2): 2015–16, 2021–22
- FIBA Europe SuperCup Women
  - Winners (1): 2022
- Ligue Féminine
  - 1995, 1996, 1997, 1998, 1999, 2000, 2006, 2008, 2009, 2011, 2012, 2013, 2015, 2018, 2022
- Coupe de France
  - 1990, 1991, 2005, 2006, 2008, 2009, 2010, 2014, 2017, 2018, 2019
- Tournoi de la Fédération
  - 1996, 1999, 2000, 2001, 2006, 2007, 2008
- Match des Champions
  - 2014, 2015

== Current roster ==
Note: Flags indicate national team eligibility at FIBA-sanctioned events. Players may hold other non-FIBA nationalities not displayed.

Tango Bourges roster
Players
Coaches

Pos.	No.	Nat.	Name	Ht.	Age
SG	1	(France)	Poilvé, Maëwenn	1.75 m (5 ft 9 in)	18 – 4 December 2007
SF	2	(France)	Foppossi, Marie-Paule	1.84 m (6 ft 0 in)	28 – 28 January 1998
PF	3	(France) (Chad)	Djaldi-Tabdi, Maëva	1.87 m (6 ft 2 in)	27 – 3 December 1998
PG	4	(Spain)	Méndez, Laura	1.70 m (5 ft 7 in)	24 – 21 October 2001
F	20	(United States)	Thomas, Shakayla	1.82 m (6 ft 0 in)	30 – 5 May 1996
SG	23	(United States)	Wallace, Sydney	1.73 m (5 ft 8 in)	32 – 6 December 1993
C	25	(France)	Naigre, Élodie (C)	1.83 m (6 ft 0 in)	31 – 4 June 1995
SF	26	(France)	Pitarch-Granel, Inès	1.82 m (6 ft 0 in)	20 – 6 May 2006
SF	36	(France)	Djaldi-Tabdi, Clarince	1.84 m (6 ft 0 in)	30 – 6 December 1995
PG	39	(France)	Duchet, Alix	1.66 m (5 ft 5 in)	28 – 30 December 1997

Head coach

- (France) Olivier Lafargue

Assistant coach(es)

- (France) Jérôme Authier

Legend

- (C) Team captain
- Injured

- Roster
Updated: 6 October 2026

=== Notable players ===
- (France) Alix Duchet
- (Australia) Laura Hodges
- (Australia) Alicia Poto
- (Australia) Belinda Snell
- (Australia) Marianna Tolo
- (Bosnia and Herzegovina) Slavica Ilić
- (Belgium) Marjorie Carpréaux
- (Brazil) Clarissa dos Santos
- (Brazil) Alessandra Santos
- (Brazil) Kelly Santos
- (Canada) Kayla Alexander
- (Canada) Ruth Hamblin
- (Canada) Katherine Plouffe
- (Canada) Nayo Raincock-Ekunwe
- (Democratic Republic of the Congo) Bernadette Ngoyisa
- (Croatia) Vedrana Grgin-Fonseca
- (Croatia) Sonja Kireta
- (Croatia) Ana Lelas
- (Croatia) Sena Pavetić
- (Czech Republic) Ilona Burgrová
- (Czech Republic) Eva Horáková
- (France) Nicole Antibe
- (France) Valériane Ayayi
- (France) Ornella Bankole
- (France) Helena Ciak
- (France) Amy Cissé
- (France) Jennifer Digbeu
- (France) Sandra Dijon
- (France) Céline Dumerc
- (France) Isabelle Fijalkowski
- (France) Marine Johannès
- (France) Anaël Lardy
- (France) Florence Lepron
- (France) Cathy Melain
- (France) Endy Miyem
- (France) Emmeline Ndongue
- (France) Paoline Salagnac
- (France) Odile Santaniello
- (France) Audrey Sauret
- (France) (United States) KB Sharp
- (France) Yannick Souvré
- (France) Ingrid Tanqueray
- (France) Diandra Tchatchouang
- (France) Stéphanie Vivenot
- (United Kingdom) Andrea Congreaves
- (United Kingdom) Johannah Leedham
- (Greece) Zoi Dimitrakou
- (Greece) Styliani Kaltsidou
- (Greece) Evanthia Maltsi
- (Hungary) Nóra Nagy-Bujdosó
- (Latvia) Anete Jēkabsone-Žogota
- (Latvia) Ieva Kubliņa
- (Lithuania) Reda Aleliūnaitė-Jankovska
- (Lithuania) Iveta Marčauskaitė
- (Netherlands) Sandra Van Embricqs
- (Netherlands) Chatilla van Grinsven
- (Russia) Yelena Khudashova
- (Russia) Ilona Korstin
- (Serbia) Nina Bjedov
- (Serbia) Miljana Bojović
- (Serbia) Ljubica Drljača
- (Serbia) Katarina Manić
- (Serbia) Maja Miljković
- (Serbia) (United States) Danielle Page
- (Serbia) Sonja Petrović
- (Serbia) Slobodanka Tuvić
- (Spain) Cristina Ouviña
- (Spain) Laia Palau
- (Slovakia) Anna Kotočová
- (Sweden) Frida Eldebrink
- (United States) Danielle Adams
- (United States) Kiesha Brown
- (United States) Essence Carson
- (United States) Vicky Hall
- (United States) Catherine Joens
- (United States) Shay Murphy
- (United States) Trena Trice-Hill
- (United States) Michele Van Gorp
