= Arka Gdynia (women's basketball) =

- League: Orlen Basket Liga Kobiet
- Founded: 1946
- Arena: Polsat Plus Arena Gdynia (capacity: 4,010)
- Location: Gdynia, Poland
- Team colors: Yellow and Blue
- President: (Poland) Bogusław Witkowski
- Head coach: (Latvia) Mārtiņš Zībarts
- Championships: 14 Polish Championships
- Website: basketgdynia.pl

Arka Gdynia, currently known as VBW Gdynia for sponsorship reasons, is a Polish professional women's basketball club based in Gdynia. With 14 Polish Championships and 10 Polish Cups won (as of 2025), it is one of the country's most accomplished women's basketball clubs. It plays in the Orlen Basket Liga Kobiet, the highest division in Poland.

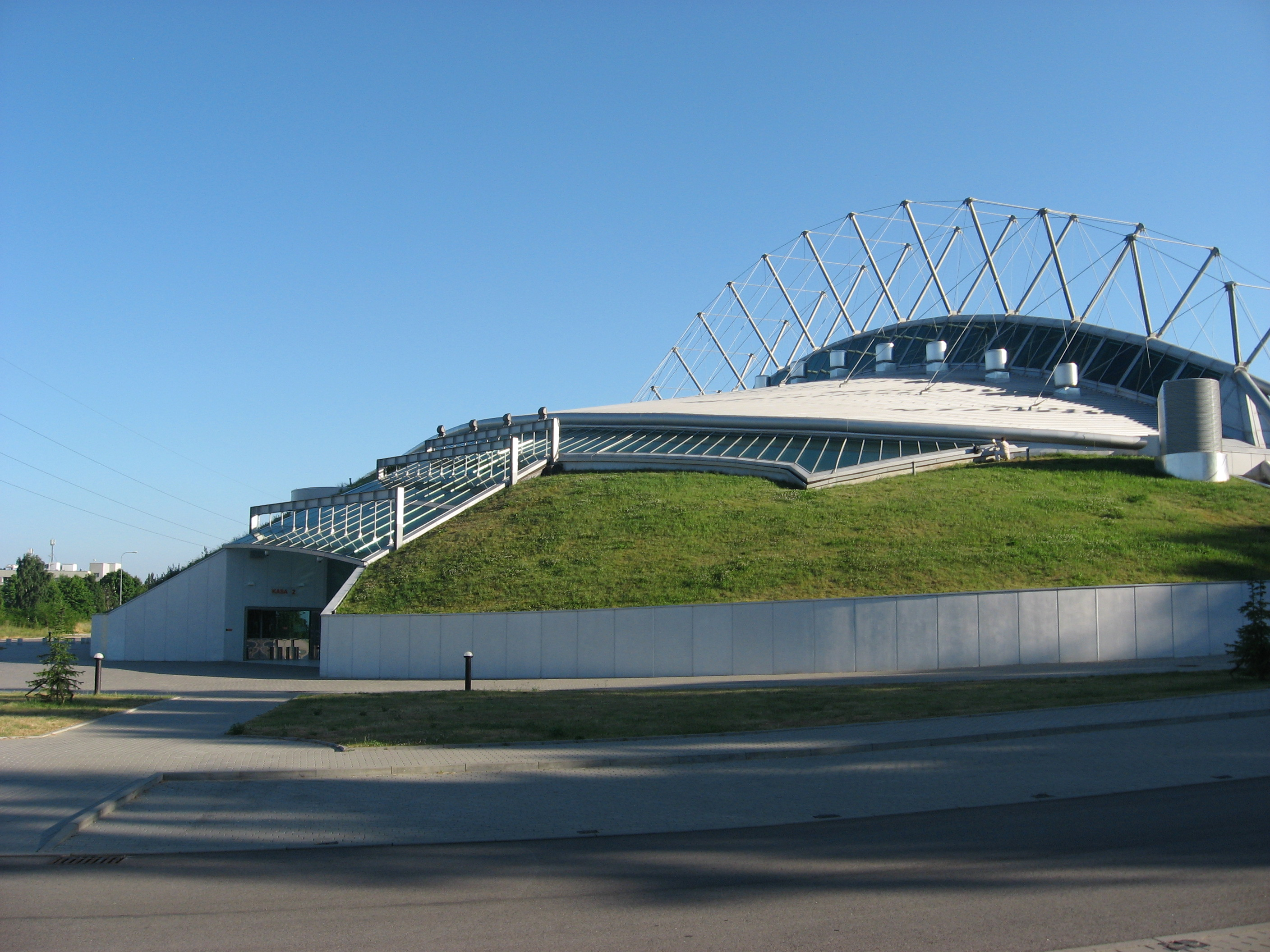
Gdynia Arena, the former home venue of Arka Gdynia

== History ==
It was founded in 1946 in the city of Gdańsk as Spójnia Gdańsk. In 1992 the club moved from Gdańsk to Gdynia and changed the name to Bałtyk Gdynia. Then it changed its name several times. From 2001 till 2010 the name of the club was Lotos Gdynia after its titular sponsor Grupa Lotos S.A. Other sponsor names followed before the team was called Basket 90 Gdynia from 2014 to 2018, and Arka Gdynia from 2018 to 2020. Since then, its name is VBW Gdynia after their sponsor VBW Engineering sp. z o.o.

== Honours ==
- Polish Championship (14): 1996, 1998, 1999, 2000, 2001, 2002, 2003, 2004, 2005, 2009, 2010, 2020, 2021, 2025
- Polish Cup (10): 1970, 1980, 1997, 2005, 2007, 2008, 2010, 2011, 2020, 2021
- EuroLeague Women:
  - Runners-up: 2002, 2004

== Current roster ==
Arka Gdynia roster
Players
Coaches

Pos.	No.	Nat.	Name	Ht.	Age
PF	0	(United States)	Davis, Rannia	1.88 m (6 ft 2 in)	27 – 24 February 1999
PF	3	(United States)	Cowling, Mikayla	1.88 m (6 ft 2 in)	30 – 9 April 1996
SG	9	(Poland)	Podgórna, Kamila	1.75 m (5 ft 9 in)	29 – 19 September 1996
PG	15	(Poland)	Rudzka, Justyna	1.71 m (5 ft 7 in)	25 – 24 December 2000
C	21	(Lithuania)	Miškinienė, Laura	1.90 m (6 ft 3 in)	33 – 28 October 1992
SG	23	(Poland)	Kastanek, Marissa Lee	1.75 m (5 ft 9 in)	35 – 31 May 1990
PG	41	(Slovakia)	Wrzesiński, Barbora	1.78 m (5 ft 10 in)	31 – 15 December 1994
PF	90	(Poland)	Ułan, Karolina	1.85 m (6 ft 1 in)	20 – 1 June 2005
C	91	(Poland)	Borkowska, Kamila	2.01 m (6 ft 7 in)	23 – 26 July 2002
PG	92	(Poland)	Bazan, Julia	1.70 m (5 ft 7 in)	24 – 1 July 2001
SF	93	(Poland)	Żytkowska, Alicja	1.79 m (5 ft 10 in)	24 – 29 August 2001
PF	94	(Poland)	Szulc, Magdalena	1.82 m (6 ft 0 in)	25 – 8 March 2001
SF	96	(Poland)	Tomasik, Nikola	1.70 m (5 ft 7 in)	20 – 19 August 2005
PG	97	(Poland)	Szymkiewicz, Magdalena	1.80 m (5 ft 11 in)	23 – 10 August 2002
SG	98	(Poland)	Gilmajster, Agada	1.70 m (5 ft 7 in)	21 – 12 December 2004
SF	98	(Poland)	Sasiak, Wiktoria	1.77 m (5 ft 10 in)	21 – 4 March 2005

Head coach

- (Romania) Philip Mestdagh

Legend

- (C) Team captain
- Injured

- Roster
Updated: 2024-8-26

== Notable former players ==
- (Russia) Anna Arkhipova
- (Australia) Rebecca Allen
- (United States) Alana Beard
- (Poland) Agnieszka Bibrzycka
- (United States) Emma Cannon
- (United States) Dominique Canty
- (United States) Tamika Catchings
- (Latvia) Elīna Dikaioulaku
- (Poland) Małgorzata Dydek
- (United States) Marie Ferdinand
- (Serbia) Gordana Grubin - Vesković
- (United States) Chamique Holdsclaw
- (Russia) Elena Karpova
- (United States) Chasity Melvin
- (Portugal) Ticha Penicheiro
- (Australia) Erin Phillips
- (United States) Elaine Powell
- (United States) Ruth Riley
- (Russia) Elen Shakirova
- (United States) Katie Smith
- (Russia) Natalia Vodopyanova
- (United States) Tamika Whitmore
- (Slovenia) Rankica Šarenac
- (Serbia) Ana Joković
- (Israel) Limor Mizrachi
