= Charel Allen =

American basketball player (born 1986)

Notre Dame Fighting Irish
- Title: Assistant coach
- League: Atlantic Coast Conference

Personal information
- Born: July 23, 1986 (age 40) Monessen, Pennsylvania, U.S.
- Listed height: 5 ft 11 in (1.80 m)
- Listed weight: 135 lb (61 kg)

Career information
- High school: Monessen (Monessen, Pennsylvania)
- College: Notre Dame (2004–2008)
- WNBA draft: 2008: 3rd round, 43rd overall pick
- Drafted by: Sacramento Monarchs
- Position: Guard
- Number: 12

Career history

Playing
- 2008: Sacramento Monarchs
- 2008–2009: Ceyhan Belediye
- 2009–2012: Dunav 8806
- 2012–2013: Elitzur Netanya
- 2012–2014: BC Levski
- 2014–2015: Neftokhimik Burgas
- 2015–2017: Montana 2003

Coaching
- 2017–2022: Cal State Fullerton (assistant)
- 2022–present: Notre Dame (assistant)

Career highlights
- 5× Bulgarian Cup champion (2010–2012, 2015–2016); 2× First-team All-Big East (2007–2008)
- Stats at Basketball Reference

Charel Allen (born July 23, 1986) is an American former professional basketball player and current assistant coach for the Notre Dame Fighting Irish. A guard, she played high school basketball at Monessen High School, where she was a two-time Pennsylvania Class A Player of the Year and finished her high school career as the fifth-leading scorer in state history. She played college basketball for the Notre Dame Fighting Irish from 2004 to 2008 and was a two-time first-team All-Big East Conference honoree. She was the first player in team history to record college career totals of 1,500 points, 500 rebounds, 200 assists and 200 steals.

Allen was selected by the Sacramento Monarchs of the Women's National Basketball Association (WNBA) in the third round of the 2008 WNBA draft. She played in six regular season games and two playoff games for the Monarchs during the 2008 season. She later played professionally overseas in Turkey, Israel, and Bulgaria from 2008 to 2017. She was a five-time Bulgarian Cup champion. After her playing career, Allen has spent time as an assistant women's basketball coach for the Cal State Fullerton Titans and Notre Dame.

== Early life ==
Charel Allen was born on July 23, 1986, in Monessen, Pennsylvania. She played high school basketball at Monessen High School in Monessen, Pennsylvania. Her freshman year, she scored a Western Pennsylvania Interscholastic Athletic League (WPIAL) playoff record 39 points in the Class A title game. She recorded 26.1 points, 8.1 rebounds, 5.1 steals and 5.4 assists per game her senior year, helping the team to a 29–2 record and a Class A state championship. Allen also averaged 29.3 points per game in eight postseason games that season. Overall, she recorded 26.1 points, 10.5 rebounds, 6.4 steals and 5.0 assists per game in high school, being named Associated Press (AP) Pennsylvania Class A Player of the Year in 2003 and 2004, AP first-team all-state in 2002, 2003, and 2004, and Street & Smith's honorable mention All-American in 2001, 2002, 2003, and 2004. She finished her high school career as the fifth-leading scorer in state history with 3,110 points. The team had a 100–19 record during her four years at Monessen High. She was also an AAU 16-and-under All-American in 2003. In the class of 2004, she was rated the No. 27 overall prospect in the country by the Blue Star Index, a national recruiting service. The "Charel Allen Character Scholarship" was later created, which is given to a Monessen High senior of Allen's choosing.

== College career ==
Allen played college basketball for the Notre Dame Fighting Irish from 2004 to 2008. She played in 33 games during her freshman season in 2004–05, averaging 7.7 points, 4.2 rebounds, 1.4 assists, and 1.2 steals per game, garnering Big East Conference All-Freshman recognition. She suffered a torn ACL in the 2005 NCAA Division I women's basketball tournament second-round loss to Arizona State. Allen appeared in 30 games in 2005–06, averaging 8.5 points, 4.3 rebounds, 1.3 assists, and 1.4 steals per game. She played in 32 games during the 2006–07 season, averaging 17.0 points, 6.2 rebounds, 2.2 assists, and 2.0 steals per game, earning first-team All-Big East and Women’s Basketball Coaches Association (WBCA) honorable mention All-American honors. She led the team in points and rebounds that season. She appeared in 34 games her senior year in 2007–08, averaging 15.1 points, 5.6 rebounds, 2.5 assists, and 1.9 steals per game, garnering first-team All-Big East, AP honorable mention All-American, and WBCA honorable mention All-American recognition. She led the team in points per game for the second consecutive season. In the 2008 NCAA Division I women's basketball tournament, Allen scored a career-high 35 points in a second-round overtime victory against the Oklahoma Sooners before losing in the Sweet Sixteen to the Tennessee Lady Volunteers.

Allen was the first player in team history to record career totals of 1,500 points, 500 rebounds, 200 assists and 200 steals. She was also a team captain during her final two seasons at Notre Dame. She was a sociology and computer applications double major, and graduated with a bachelor's degree in 2008.

== Professional career ==
Allen was selected by the Sacramento Monarchs in the third round, with the 43rd overall pick, of the 2008 WNBA draft. She played in six games for the Monarchs in 2008, averaging 2.7 points and 1.0 rebounds per game. She also played three minutes total during two playoff games, committing one turnover and one foul. During the WNBA offseason, Allen played overseas for Ceyhan Belediye in Turkey during their 2008–09 season, averaging 8.8 points, 4.4 rebounds, 1.1 assists, and 1.0 steals per game. She was waived by the Monarchs on June 4, 2009, before the start of the 2009 WNBA season.

Allen signed a training camp contract with the San Antonio Silver Stars of the WNBA on April 14, 2010. She was waived on May 13, 2010.

Allen played overseas in the Bulgarian Women's Basketball Championship league from 2009 to 2017. She played for Dunav 8806 from the 2009–10 season to the 2011–12 season, winning the Bulgarian Cup in 2010, 2011, and 2012 while also winning the Bulgarian Women's Basketball Championship title in 2012. In 2010–11, she played in 33 games, averaging 15.5 points, 6.3 rebounds and 2.2 assists per game and was noted by BGbasket.com as the team's "undisputed best player". She also earned first-team all-league honors in 2011 and 2012, and all-import team honors in 2010 and 2011. Allen also helped the team win regular season titles in 2010 and 2012.

She then played for Elitzur Netanya in Israel in 2012–13 but left the team midseason, returning to Bulgaria to play for BC Levski from 2012–13 to 2013–14. In 2013–14, she averaged 18.1 points, 7.4 rebounds and 4.2 steals per game, finishing second in the league in scoring while earning first-team all-league and league Player of the Year honors. She was also an all-import team selection in 2013 and 2014, the Import Player of the Year in 2014, and the Guard of the Year in 2014.

She played for Neftokhimik Burgas in 2014–15 and won the Bulgarian Cup for the fourth time. The team also won the regular season title that year.

She played for Montana 2003 from 2015–16 to 2016–17. In 2016, Montana 2003 won both the league title and the Bulgarian Cup while Allen garnered first-team all-league and league Guard of the Year recognition. In 2017, she helped the team win the regular season title and earned first-team all-league honors for the second consecutive season.

Allen encountered a significant language barrier during her time in Bulgaria. In 2011, she noted that she knew "a few words" and in 2014 she said that "halftime speeches are usually all in Bulgarian. Coach (Stefan Mihaylov) trusts me, though. With my knowledge of the game, I know what he's saying and what we need to do. If not, he'll translate for me later and let me know what I needed to do."

== Coaching career ==
Allen started working as a skill development trainer in 2009. In 2011, she founded The Charel Allen Basketball Camp and Highlight Game in Pennsylvania. She was an assistant coach at Monessen Middle School during the 2013–14 season. While in Bulgaria, she was a player-coach in 2016 and 2017.

Allen was an assistant coach for the Cal State Fullerton Titans women's basketball team from the 2017–18 season to the 2021–22 season. She was also the team's associate head coach during the final season. She assisted with recruiting during her time at Cal State Fullerton as well.

In July 2022, Allen returned to the Notre Dame Fighting Irish women's basketball team as an assistant coach.
