= 1993–94 Ronchetti Cup =

The 1993–94 Ronchetti Cup was the 23rd edition of FIBA's second-tier competition for European women's basketball clubs. It was contested by 67 teams, ten more than the previous season, and ran from 8 September 1993 to 16 March 1994. Ahena Cesena won the competition for the first and sole time, defeating defending champion Lavezzini Parma in the third all-Italian final in your years. It was the last of five editions in a row won by Italian teams.

== First qualifying round ==
Team #1	Agg.	Team #2	1st	2nd
Tory Kosice (Slovakia)	140–129	(Croatia) Montmontaza Zagreb	69–56	71–73
Gustino Schnitzelplatz (Austria)	140–129	(Slovakia) Slovan Bratislava	70–92	61–78
Flamurtari Vlorë (Albania)	141–155	(Bulgaria) Dorostol Silistra	81–75	60–80
ENAD Nicosia (Cyprus)	82–121	(Israel) Elitzur Ramla	37–54	45–67
Chaika Donetsk (Ukraine)	Walkover	(Slovakia) Lokomotiva Kosice		
Serebranaja Korzina (Ukraine)	106–192	(Bulgaria) Septemvri Sofia	54–89	52–103

== Second qualifying round ==
Team #1	Agg.	Team #2	1st	2nd
ELK Meelis (Estonia)	124–126	(Germany) Wemex Berlin	62–55	62–71
Levski Sofia (Bulgaria)	131–109	(Greece) Agia Paraskevi	68–55	63–54
İstanbul Üniversitesi (Turkey)	119–145	(Germany) Wolfenbüttel	65–69	54–76
Tory Kosice (Slovakia)	128–106	(Lithuania) Telekomas Vilnius	72–55	56–51
Elitzur Ramla (Israel)	142–148	(Romania) Icim Arad	86–83	56–65
Slovan Bratislava (Slovakia)	136–131	(Turkey) Botasspor	72–65	64–66
Laisve Kaunas (Lithuania)	200–132	(Russia) Concern Podolsk	96–74	104–58
Hrvatski Dragovoljac (Croatia)	136–131	(Bulgaria) Dorostol Silistra	64–54	61–70
Copia Prague (Czech Republic)	113–130	(Hungary) Borsodchem Miskolc	55–70	58–60
KZO Wetzikon (Switzerland)	142–200	(Spain) Pariódico Zaragoza	71–103	71–97
Elitzur Holon (Israel)	123–135	(Greece) Apollon Kalamarias	62–65	61–70
Chaika Donetsk (Ukraine)	170–152	(Romania) Fartec Brasov	77–49	93–103
Deniz Nakliyat (Turkey)	96–186	(France) Tarbes	51–94	45–92
Královo Pole (Czech Republic)	139–155	(Poland) Sommerkonfort Lodz	71–70	68–85
Horizont Minsk (Belarus)	122–194	(Italy) Willwood Venezia	62–82	60–112
Septemvri Sofia (Bulgaria)	148–151	(Turkey) Besiktas	90–79	58–72
Kograd Maribor (Slovenia)	113–179	(Italy) Famila Schio	56–83	57–96
Acadimir Ilioupolis (Greece)	126–141	(Israel) Lachen RamatHaSharon	69–69	57–72
Tesmodon Rostov (Russia)	173–128	(Czech Republic) Sokol Hradec Kralove	92–56	81–72
Simeks Skopje (North Macedonia)	82–225	(Hungary) Budapest SE	46–119	36–106
MENT Thessaloniki (Greece)	111–140	(Hungary) MTK Budapest	73–63	38–77
Kozachka Zaporozhye (Ukraine)	Walkover	(Poland) Polfa Pabianice		
Sparta Bertrange (Luxembourg)	99–157	(Germany) Universa Marburg	51–76	48–81
Rogaska Zlatina (Slovenia)	185–164	(Czech Republic) Sparta Prague	75–84	110–80
Miniflat Rozenbeka (Belgium)	109–186	(France) Valenciennes Olympic	58–89	51–97
Moldova Chisinau	129–130	(Slovenia) Odeja Kranj	73–55	56–75
Spartak Myjava (Slovakia)	112–155	(Italy) Ahena Cesena	58–73	54–82
Symel Tenerife (Spain)	164–94	(Portugal) CAB Madeira	82–46	82–48

== Third Qualifying Stage ==
Team #1	Agg.	Team #2	1st	2nd
Wemex Berlin (Germany)	125–132	(Bulgaria) Levski Sofia	74–62	51–70
Wolfenbüttel (Germany)	177–147	(Slovakia) Tory Kosice	88–55	89–92
Icim Arad (Romania)	120–138	(France) Stade Clermontois	67–59	53–79
Slovan Bratislava (Slovakia)	119–182	(Lithuania) Laisve Kaunas	57–95	62–87
Hrvatski Dragovoljac (Croatia)	139–153	(Hungary) Borsodchem Miskolc	73–74	66–79
Periódico Zaragoza (Spain)	141–127	(Greece) Apollon Kalamarias	70–61	71–66
Tarbes (France)	Walkover	(Ukraine) Chaika Donetsk		
Periódico Zaragoza (Spain)	141–127	(Greece) Apollon Kalamarias	70–61	71–66
Sommerkonfort Lodz (Poland)	121–147	(Italy) Willwood Vicenza	68–67	53–80
Besiktas (Turkey)	104–160	(Italy) Famila Schio	41–75	63–85
Vigo (Spain)	134–138	(Israel) Lachen Ramat HaSharon	62–65	72–73
Tesmodon Rostov (Russia)	153–131	(Hungary) Budapest SE	72–60	81–71
MTK Budapest (Hungary)	167–140	(Ukraine) Kozachka Zaporozhye	93–65	74–75
Universa Marburg (Germany)	78–189	(Spain) BEX Argentaria	40–92	38–97
Rogaska Slatina (Slovenia)	144–225	(France) Valenciennes Olympic	65–95	79–130
Odeja Kranj (Slovenia)	119–164	(Italy) Ahena Cesena	56–85	63–79
Symel Tenerife (Spain)	123–164	(Italy) Lavezzini Parma	54–80	69–84

== Group stage ==
=== Group A ===
Team	Pld	W	L	PF	PA
(Italy) Willwood Vicenza	6	4	2	437	375
(France) Valenciennes Olympic	6	4	2	450	408
(Israel) Lachen Ramat HaSharon	6	2	4	399	470
(Russia) Tesmodon Rostov	6	1	5	408	488

=== Group B ===
Team	Pld	W	L	PF	PA
(Italy) Ahena Cesena	6	4	2	460	417
(France) Tarbes	6	4	2	459	430
(Lithuania) Tasve Kaunas	6	3	3	479	491
(Hungary) Borsodchem Miskolc	6	1	5	428	488

=== Group C ===
Team	Pld	W	L	PF	PA
(Spain) BEX Argentaria	6	5	1	464	362
(Italy) Famila Schio	6	3	3	434	444
(Germany) Wolfenbüttel	6	3	3	441	420
(Bulgaria) Levski Sofia	6	1	5	370	483

=== Group D ===
Team	Pld	W	L	PF	PA
(Italy) Lavezzini Parma	6	6	0	539	412
(France) Stade Clermontois	6	3	3	433	426
(Hungary) MTK Budapest	6	3	3	430	432
(Spain) Periódico Zaragoza	6	0	6	350	482

== Quarterfinals ==
Team #1	Agg.	Team #2	1st	2nd
Valenciennes Olympic (France)	118–127	(Italy) Ahena Cesena	59–59	59–68
Stade Clermontois (France)	129–148	(Spain) BEX Argentaria	66–76	63–72
Tarbes (France)	154–135	(Italy) Willwood Vicenza	71–61	83–74
Famila Schio (Italy)	136–147	(Italy) Lavezzini Parma	74–67	62–80

== Semifinals ==
Team #1	Agg.	Team #2	1st	2nd
Ahena Cesena (Italy)	122–112	(Spain) BEX Argentaria	61–59	61–53
Tarbes (France)	132–150	(Italy) Lavezzini Parma	69–62	63–88

== Final ==
Team #1	Agg.	Team #2	1st	2nd
Ahena Cesena (Italy)	144–133	(Italy) Lavezzini Parma	78–65	66–68
