= Amanda Johnson =

American basketball player (born 1990)

Personal information
- Born: 21 August 1990 (age 36) Santa Rosa, California, U.S.
- Listed height: 6 ft 2 in (1.88 m)

Career information
- High school: Maria Carrillo (Santa Rosa, California)
- College: Oregon (2008–2012)
- WNBA draft: 2012: 3rd round, 33rd overall pick
- Drafted by: Phoenix Mercury
- Playing career: 2012–present
- Position: Forward

Career history
- 2012–2013: WBC Dunav Ruse
- 2013–2014: Fizzy Riva Basket
- 2018–2019: Ipswich Force
- 2018–2019: Sydney Uni Flames
- 2021: South West Metro Pirates
- 2023–2024: Northside Wizards

Career highlights
- NBL1 North champion (2023); 2× QBL / NBL1 North MVP (2018, 2024); NBL1 North All-Star Five (2024); 2× QBL All-League Team (2018, 2019); Bulgarian League champion (2013); Bulgarian Cup winner (2013); Bulgarian Cup MVP (2013); First-team All-Pac-12 (2012)
- Stats at Basketball Reference

Amanda Nicole Johnson (born April 21, 1990) is an American professional basketball player who last played for the Northside Wizards of the NBL1 North. She played college basketball for the Oregon Ducks before being drafted by the Phoenix Mercury in the 2012 WNBA draft. She began her professional career in Bulgaria and Switzerland before taking four years away from basketball. In 2018, she was named Queensland Basketball League MVP with the Ipswich Force and then debuted in the Women's National Basketball League for the Sydney Uni Flames. She won an NBL1 North championship with the Northside Wizards in 2023 and was named NBL1 North MVP in 2024.

== Early life ==
Johnson was born in Santa Rosa, California. She started playing basketball at the age of six, encouraged by her parents who both played. She attended Maria Carrillo High School, where she played four years for both the basketball team and the soccer team. She scored over 2,000 points during her high school career for the Pumas. As a senior, she led Maria Carrillo to a 28–2 overall record and a North Bay League Championship with a 14–0 record while averaging 24.0 points and 10.5 rebounds per game.

== College career ==
As a freshman at Oregon in 2008–09, Johnson averaged 7.9 points and a team-leading 5.4 rebounds per game. She was named Pac-10 All-Freshman Honorable Mention and became the first freshman in program history since Bev Smith (1978–79) to lead the Ducks in both rebounding (163) and steals (42). She scored a season-high 18 points in 77–69 win over Washington on February 14, 2009.

As a sophomore in 2009–10, Johnson was named Pac-10 Honorable Mention after averaging 12.7 points per game with a team-leading (3rd Pac-10) 8.5 rebounds per game. She scored a career-high 32 points, and added 11 rebounds, shooting 13-of-18 from the floor and 4-of-5 from 3-point range in a 95–68 win over Portland on December 2, 2009.

As a junior in 2010–11, Johnson was named Pac-10 Honorable Mention for the second straight year after finishing third in the Pac-10 in both scoring and rebounding, averaging 15.9 points and 8.3 rebounds. She became just the ninth player in program history, and first since 2002, to reach the 1,000-point threshold during her junior year. She recorded game and season highs with 29 points, 14 rebounds, four blocks and four steals in loss to CSU Bakersfield on November 27, 2010.

As a senior in 2011–12, Johnson was named to the Pac-12 All-Conference Team for the first time in her career after leading the Ducks with averages 18.0 points and 9.6 rebounds per game. She scored 31 points, including 20 in the first half, and added 11 rebounds and a career-best five 3-pointers in a win over Illinois on November 18. Two days later, she recorded games high in points (30) and rebounds (19) as Oregon edged Portland State, 75–71. She was subsequently named the Pac-12 Player of the Week for the week of November 14–20 after averaging 30.5 points and 15.0 rebounds per game. She averaged 20.1 points and 10.1 rebounds per game in Oregon's first nine games of the year before fracturing her thumb in a fall to the floor against Denver on December 11 and missed the team's next 11 games.

Johnson ended her collegiate career with 1,505 points and 893 rebounds. She became the only player in Oregon women's basketball history to rank in the all-time top five of points (5th), rebounds (4th), steals (195, 5th) and three-pointers (168, 5th). Off the court, Johnson graduated with a double major in psychology and sociology, and pursued a Master's degree in couples and family therapy. She became the first Oregon women's player in program history to be named to the Capital One Academic All-America team on three occasions (first team: 2012, 2011; second team: 2010). She was named to the Pac-12 All-Academic First Team for the third straight year in 2012 and was also the Pac-12 Scholar-Athlete of the Year in 2012.

== Professional career ==
Johnson was drafted in the third round of the 2012 WNBA draft by the Phoenix Mercury. As the 33rd overall pick, she became the first student-athlete from Oregon to be drafted since Cathrine Kraayeveld in 2005. Her career in Phoenix lasted three weeks after suffering a bad concussion, which led to her being waived.

Johnson made her professional debut in the 2012–13 season with WBC Dunav Ruse in the Bulgarian League. She helped Ruse win the league championship as well as the Bulgarian Cup title, earning Cup MVP honors. In 31 league games, she averaged 14.2 points, 10.5 rebounds, 2.5 assists and 1.9 steals per game. She also averaged 19.8 points, 7.3 rebounds, 1.8 assists, 1.0 steals and 1.3 blocks in four Eurocup games.

For the 2013–14 season, Johnson joined Fizzy Riva Basket of the Swiss League. In 22 games, she averaged 22.4 points, 12.2 rebounds, 2.6 assists, 2.1 steals and 1.2 blocks per game.

Johnson walked away from the sport in 2014, with her exile lasting until November 2017.

Johnson joined the Ipswich Force of the Queensland Basketball League (QBL) in Australia for the 2018 season. She was named QBL Most Valuable Player after leading the league in scoring and rebounds, finishing with 25 points and 14 rebounds per game. She was also named QBL All-League Team.

On July 6, 2018, Johnson signed with the Sydney Uni Flames of the Women's National Basketball League (WNBL) for the 2018–19 season. In 21 games, she averaged 3.7 points and 4.1 rebounds per game.

Johnson re-joined the Ipswich Force for the 2019 QBL season. In 19 games, she averaged 23.0 points, 13.4 rebounds per game, 3.5 assists and 1.9 steals per game. She was named to QBL All-League Team for the second straight year.

Johnson was set to re-join the Force for the 2020 NBL1 season prior to the season cancellation due to the COVID-19 pandemic.

In January 2021, Johnson signed with the South West Metro Pirates of the NBL1 North for the 2021 season. In 12 games, she averaged 23.0 points, 14.67 rebounds, 2.92 assists and 1.92 steals per game.

In February 2023, Johnson signed with the Northside Wizards for the 2023 NBL1 North season. She helped the Wizards win the NBL1 North championship, winning 2–0 in the grand final series over the Rockhampton Cyclones. In 23 games, she averaged 17.1 points, 10.8 rebounds, 2.5 assists and 2.0 steals per game.

In November 2023, Johnson re-signed with the Wizards for the 2024 NBL1 North season. She was named NBL1 North MVP and earned league All-Star Five honors. In 19 games, she averaged 20.47 points, 12.0 rebounds, 3.74 assists and 1.95 steals per game.

== Personal life ==
Johnson the daughter of Erik and Lisa Johnson, and has two younger brothers, Brian and Curtis.
