= 1992–93 Ronchetti Cup =

The 1992–93 Ronchetti Cup was the 22nd edition of FIBA Europe's second competition for women's basketball teams, from 30 September 1992 to 17 March 1993. Basket Parma defeated Olimpia Poznan in the final to win its second title three years later. The competition's qualifying stage was expanded due to the break-up of the Soviet Union and the SFR Yugoslavia. At the same time, the three teams from the FR Yugoslavia were disqualified in the application of the United Nations Security Council Resolution 757.

== Qualifying round ==
Team #1	Agg.	Team #2	1st	2nd
MTK Budapest (Hungary)	Walkover	(Federal Republic of Yugoslavia) Vojvodina Novi Sad		
Uralmash Ekaterinburg (Russia)	201–164	(Hungary) Szeviép Szeged	99–90	102–74
Slavia Sofia (Bulgaria)	142–156	(Slovenia) Rogaska Slatina	77–83	65–73
Becej (Federal Republic of Yugoslavia)	Walkover	(Turkey) Deniz Nakliyat		
Lachen Ramat HaSharon (Israel)	154–111	(Bulgaria) Levski Sofia	101–49	53–62
Goldzack Wuppertal (Germany)	146–170	(Italy) Scuola Pitagora	89–80	57–90
Panathinaikos (Greece)	118–139	(Romania) Sportul Studentesc	58–72	60–67
Stal Dnipropetrovsk (Ukraine)	112–119	(Bulgaria) Kremikovtsi	61–50	51–69
Olimpia Poznan (Poland)	158–123	(Ukraine) Chaika Donetsk	74–47	84–76
Rapid Bucharest (Romania)	123–145	(Bulgaria) Maritsa Plovdiv	58–70	65–75
Sparta Luxembourg	129–127	(Belgium) Diest	61–55	68–72
Hapoel Kishon (Israel)	154–135	(Greece) MENT Thessaloniki	83–55	71–80
Lietuvos Telekomas (Lithuania)	143–140	(Czech Republic) USK Prague	76–66	67–74
ADIS Yerevan (Armenia)	157–145	(Belgium) Mini-Flat Dames	79–73	78–71
Slavia Banska Bystrica (Czech Republic)	136–133	(Croatia) Montmontaza Zagreb	81–75	55–58
Wolfenbüttel (Germany)	172–145	(Finland) Karhun Pojat	88–68	84–78
Odeja Kranj (Slovenia)	147–190	(Hungary) Borsodchem Miskolc	77–80	67–113
Fors-Mazhor St. Petersburg (Russia)	155–151	(Romania) Constar Arad	77–64	78–87
Paggio Agia Paraskevi (Greece)	Walkover	(Federal Republic of Yugoslavia) Partizan Belgrade		
IÜSC Istanbul (Turkey)	85–132	(Hungary) Ferencvárosi Diego	60–79	25–53
LKS Lodz (Poland)	171–198	(France) Valenciennes Olympic	91–94	80–108
Symel Tenerife (Spain)	151–169	(France) Pays d'Aix B13	79–79	72–90
Grazer AK (Austria)	111–172	(Czech Republic) Sparta Prague	50–79	61–93
Lokomotiva Kosice (Czech Republic)	158–146	(Slovenia) Apis Maribor	79–69	79–77

== Round of 32 ==
Team #1	Agg.	Team #2	1st	2nd
MTK Budapest (Hungary)	145–129	(Spain) Juven Saski	64–69	81–60
Uralmash Ekaterinburg (Russia)	174–147	(Slovenia) Rogaska Slatina	91–68	83–79
Deniz Nakliyat (Turkey)	133–143	(Israel) Lachen Ramat HaSharon	72–79	61–64
Fenerbahçe (Turkey)	99–206	(Italy) Scuola Pitagora	55–109	44–97
Sportul Studentesc (Romania)	131–138	(Bulgaria) Kremikovtsi	71–65	60–73
Olimpia Poznan (Poland)	183–111	(Bulgaria) Maritsa Plovdiv	95–45	88–66
Sparta Luxembourg	79–153	(France) Asterac Mirande	53–66	26–87
Hapoel Kishon (Israel)	115–169	(Lithuania) Lietuvos Telekomas	61–87	54–82
ADIS Yerevan (Armenia)	171–155	(Czech Republic) Slavia Banska Bystrica	84–83	87–72
Wolfenbüttel (Germany)	145–153	(Hungary) Borsodchem Miskolc	92–81	52–72
Fors-Mazhor St. Petersburg (Russia)	139–160	(Greece) Paggio Agia Paraskevi	79–66	60–94
Ferencvárosi Diego (Hungary)	146–159	(France) Valencienne Olympic	66–81	80–78
Pays d'Aix B13 (France)	135–154	(Italy) Lavezzini Parma	67–72	68–82
Sparta Prague (Czech Republic)	138–175	(Italy) Willwood Vicenza	71–99	67–76
Celta Vigo (Spain)	125–118	(Italy) Libertas Trogylos	72–52	53–66
Lokomotiva Kosice (Czech Republic)	127–147	(Greece) Sporting Athens	67–68	60–79

== Group stage ==
=== Group A ===
Team	Pld	W	L	PF	PA
(France) Valenciennes Olympic	6	5	1	501	435
(Spain) Celta Vigo	6	4	2	487	440
(Hungary) Borsodchem Miskolc	6	3	3	434	462
(Israel) Lachen Ramat HaSharon	6	0	6	427	512

=== Group B ===
Team	Pld	W	L	PF	PA
(Italy) Willwood Vicenza	6	5	1	522	433
(Greece) Sporting Athens	6	4	2	464	448
(Bulgaria) Kremikovtsi	6	2	4	421	475
(Russia) Uralmash Ekaterinburg	6	1	5	460	511

=== Group C ===
Team	Pld	W	L	PF	PA
(Italy) Lavezzini Parma	6	5	1	531	426
(Poland) Olimpia Poznan	6	4	2	476	442
(Lithuania) Lietuvos Telekomas	6	3	3	500	490
(Greece) Paggio Agia Paraskevi	6	0	6	361	510

=== Group D ===
Team	Pld	W	L	PF	PA
(Italy) Scuola Pitagora	4	3	1	376	259
(France) Astarac Mirande	4	3	1	318	318
(Hungary) MTK Budapest	4	0	4	266	371
(Armenia) ADIS Yerevan (withdrew)					

== Quarter-finals ==
Team #1	Agg.	Team #2	1st	2nd
Celta Vigo (Spain)	149–155	(Italy) Willwood Vicenza	81–81	68–74
Astarac Mirande (France)	154–175	(Italy) Lavezzini Parma	78–78	76–97
Olimpia Poznan (Poland)	187–134	(Italy) Scuola Pitagora	102–72	85–62
Sporting Athens (Greece)	124–154	(France) Valenciennes Olympic	61–78	63–76

== Semifinals ==
Team #1	Agg.	Team #2	1st	2nd
Willwood Vicenza (Italy)	138–159	(Italy) Lavezzini Parma	68–69	70–90
Olimpia Poznan (Poland)	154–151	(France) Valenciennes Olympic	72–73	82–78

== Final ==
Team #1	Agg.	Team #2	1st	2nd
Lavezzini Parma (Italy)	162–132	(Poland) Olimpia Poznan	91–62	71–70
