= USC CSKA Sofia =

Bulgarian sports society from Sofia, Bulgaria

USC CSKA Sofia ОСК ЦСКА София
- First played: 5 May 1948

CSKA (Bulgarian: ЦСКА) was a Bulgarian sports society from Sofia, Bulgaria. CSKA stands for Central Sports Club of the Army (Bulgarian: Централен Спортен Клуб на Армията). It was founded on 5 May 1948 as Septemvri pri CDV, after the unification of the two sports clubs from the city, Chavdar and Septemvri. Since then, the club changed its name several times before settling on CSKA in 1989.

The club is historically known as the Bulgarian Army sports club. Currently the sports club's departments are autonomous and are separated as of 1992. Therefore, the only connection of the departments to the Army are the historical traditions and the Bulgarian Army Stadium. Nevertheless, in the moment all of the clubs who have a connection to the sports society are incorporated into one joint society called United Sports Clubs CSKA (USC CSKA; Bulgarian: Обединени спортни клубове ЦСКА, ОСК ЦСКА), which is currently а successor of the previous disbanded organization.

Currently sections which belong to CSKA Sofia (Bulgarian: ЦСКА София) are football, basketball, volleyball, tennis, wrestling, athletics, ice hockey, chess, gymnastics, handball, taekwondo, boxing, weightlifting, judo, cycling, and rowing.

== Departments ==
The most popular departments of the sports club are:

- PFC CSKA Sofia, football club
- BC CSKA Sofia, basketball club
- HC CSKA Sofia, ice hockey club
- VC CSKA Sofia, volleyball club
- WK CSKA Sofia, water polo club
- HBC CSKA Sofia, handball club

== Football ==
=== Men ===
First League:

- Champions (31) (record): 1948, 1951, 1952, 1954, 1955, 1956, 1957, 1958, 1958–59, 1959–60, 1960–61, 1961–62, 1965–66, 1968–69, 1970–71, 1971–72, 1972–73, 1974–75, 1975–76, 1979–80, 1980–81, 1981–82, 1982–83, 1986–87, 1988–89, 1989–90, 1991–92, 1996–97, 2002–03, 2004–05, 2007–08

Bulgarian V Group:

- Champions (1): 2015–16

Bulgarian Cup:

- Winners (22 times): 1951, 1954, 1955, 1960–61, 1964–65, 1968–69, 1971–72, 1972–73, 1973–74, 1982–83, 1984–85, 1986–87, 1987–88, 1988–89, 1992–93, 1996–97, 1998–99, 2005–06, 2010–11, 2015–16, 2020–21, 2025–26

Bulgarian Supercup:

- Winners (5): 1989, 2006, 2008, 2011, 2026

Bulgarian Cup – (secondary cup competition)

- Winners (1 time) (shared record): 1980-81

Cup of the Soviet Army – (secondary cup competition)

- Winners (4 times) (record): 1984-85, 1985-1986, 1988-89, 1989-90

European Cup / UEFA Champions League

- Semi-finals (2): 1966–67, 1981–82
- Quarter-finals (4): 1956–57, 1973–74, 1980–81, 1989–90

UEFA Cup / UEFA Europa League

- Round of 32 (3): 1984–85, 1991–92, 1998–99
- Group stage (4): 2005–06, 2009–10, 2010–11, 2020–21

European Cup Winners' Cup / UEFA Cup Winners' Cup

- Semi-finals (1): 1988–89

UEFA Europa Conference League

- Group stage (1): 2021–22

=== PFC CSKA Sofia II ===
Bulgarian V Group:
- Champions (1): 1982–83

=== Women ===
Bulgarian League:

- Champions (2): 1988–89, 1992–93

Bulgarian Cup:

- Winners (2 times): 1986–87, 1989–90

== Volleyball ==
=== Men ===
NVL:

- Champions (29) (record): 1948, 1949, 1957, 1958, 1962, 1968, 1969, 1970, 1971, 1972, 1973, 1976, 1977, 1978, 1981, 1982, 1983, 1984, 1986, 1987, 1988, 1989, 1990, 1993, 1994, 1995, 2008, 2010, 2011

Bulgarian Cup:

- Winners (19 times) (record): 1967, 1969, 1970, 1973, 1979, 1981, 1982, 1984, 1985, 1986, 1988, 1990, 1991, 1992, 1993, 2002, 2009, 2010, 2011

CEV Champions League:

- Winners (1): 1968-69

CEV Champions League "Final Four" Participant:

- 1962-63 (1/2 final), 1970-71 (1/2 final)
- 1976-77 (3-rd), 1984-85 (3-rd)
- 1986-87 (4-th), 1987-88 (4-th), 1989-90 (4-th)

Cup Winner's Cup:

- Winners (1): 1975-76

Cup Winner's Cup "Final Four" Participant:

- 1985-86 (3-rd)
- 1980-81 (4-th)

CEV Cup' "Final Four" Participant:

- 2010-11 (1/2 final)

Challenge Cup

- Eighth-finals (1): 2024-25

=== Women ===
NVL:

- Champions (22): 1978, 1979, 1982, 1983, 1985, 1986, 1987, 1988, 1989, 1991, 1992, 1993, 1995, 2000, 2004, 2005, 2007, 2008, 2010, 2011, 2012, 2013

Bulgarian Cup:

- Winners (19 times): 1969, 1976, 1979, 1981, 1982, 1983, 1985, 1986, 1988, 1989, 1993, 1995, 1996, 2000, 2004, 2008, 2010, 2011, 2013

CEV Champions League:

- Winners (2): 1978-79, 1983-84

CEV Champions League "Final Four" Participant:

- 1987-88 (4-th), 1988-89 (4-th)

Cup Winner's Cup

- Winners (1): 1981-82

Cup Winner's Cup "Final Four" Participant:

- 1972-73 (2-nd), 1975-76 (2-nd), 1990-91 (2-nd),
- 1980-81 (3-rd),
- 1976-77 (4-th),

Challenge Cup

- Eighth-finals (1): 1994-95

== Basketball ==
=== Men ===
NBL:

- Champions (12): 1949, 1950, 1951, 1965, 1967, 1977, 1980, 1983, 1984, 1990, 1991, 1992

Bulgarian Cup:

- Winners (17 times) (record): 1953, 1955, 1962, 1963, 1973, 1974, 1977, 1978, 1981, 1984, 1985, 1989, 1990, 1991, 1992, 1994, 2005

BBL A Group/Second League:

- Champions (1): 2021–22

European Champions' Cup

- Quarter-finals (2): 1965–66, 1967–68

FIBA European Cup Winners' Cup

- Semi-finals (1): 1974–75
- Quarter-finals (2): 1973–74, 1975–76

=== Women ===
Bulgarian Championship:

- Champions (1): 2006–07

Bulgarian Cup:

- Winners (1 time): 2007

Women's Adriatic League:

- Winners (1 time): 2006–07

EuroCup Women

- 1/16 finalists (1): 2006–07

== Hockey ==
=== Men ===
Bulgarian League:

- Champions (17): 1964, 1965, 1966, 1967, 1969, 1971, 1972, 1973, 1974, 1975, 1983, 1984, 1986, 2013, 2014, 2015, 2026

Bulgarian Cup:

- Winners (16 times): 1964, 1965, 1967, 1972, 1973, 1975, 1976, 1978, 1981, 1983, 1986, 1987, 2012, 2013, 2025, 2026

== Handball ==
=== Men ===
A Group:

- Champions (10): 1976, 1978, 1979, 1981, 1983, 1984, 1987, 1989, 1990, 1991

Bulgarian Cup:

- Winners (10 times): 1981, 1982, 1984, 1985, 1987, 1988, 1990, 1991, 1992, 2002

European Champions' Cup

- 1/8 finalists (5): 1979–80, 1981–82, 1983–84, 1984–85, 1989–90

Cup Winners' Cup

- Quarter-finals (1): 1980–81

IHF Cup

- Quarter-finals (1): 1986–87

=== Women ===
A Group:

- Champions (12): 1973, 1974, 1975, 1976, 1978, 1983, 1985, 1987, 1989, 1990, 1991, 1992

Bulgarian Cup:

- Winners (8 times): 1975, 1976, 1982, 1984, 1985, 1988, 1989, 1992

European Champions' Cup

- Quarter-finals (3): 1973–74, 1974–75, 1983–84

Cup Winners' Cup

- Semi-finals (2): 1984–85, 1988–89
- Quarter-finals (1): 1977–78

== Water polo ==
=== Men ===
Bulgarian Championship:

- Champions (39) (record): 1952, 1961, 1962, 1963, 1964, 1965, 1966, 1969, 1973, 1974, 1975, 1976, 1977, 1979, 1980, 1981, 1982, 1983, 1984, 1985, 1986, 1988, 1989, 1992, 1994, 1995, 1998, 1999, 2000, 2001, 2003, 2005, 2006, 2007, 2011, 2012, 2014, 2015, 2021

Bulgarian Cup:

- Winners (31 times) (record) 2007, 2011, 2015, 2017

European Cup

- 1/4 finalists (4): 1969–70, 1973–74, 1976–77, 1989–90

Cup Winners' Cup

- 1/4 finalists (1): 1985–86

== Medals ==
Competition	Gold	Silver	Bronze	Total
Summer Olympics	15	10	19	44
World Championships	67	76	81	224
European Championships	99	84	78	261
Total number of medals	181	170	178	529

(*)Statistics can be inaccurate. Medals are not included if they were won by a player who competed for CSKA but was at another club when he/she won a medal.

== Trophies ==
Men's
Sport	Titles	Cups	Supercups	European
Football	31	22+1+4	5	–
Volleyball	29	19	–	1+1
Basketball	12	17	–	–
Hockey	17	16	–	–
Handball	10	10	–	–
Water polo	39	31	–	–
Total	138	120	5	2

Women's
Sport	Titles	Cups	Regional	European
Football	2	2	–	–
Volleyball	22	19	–	2+1
Basketball	1	1	1	–
Handball	12	8	–	–
Total	37	30	1	3
