= Lokomotiv Sofia (sports club) =

Bulgarian sports club

Lokomotiv Sofia (Bulgarian: ЛОКОМОТИВ София) is a sports club from Sofia, Bulgaria, founded in 1929. Its football team, PFC Lokomotiv Sofia, is its most renowned sports branch.

== See also ==
- BC Lokomotiv Sofia
- Lokomotiv RFC
- PFC Lokomotiv Sofia
- WBC Lokomotiv Sofia
- VC Lokomotiv Sofia
