= Laëtitia Guapo =

French basketball player (born 1995)

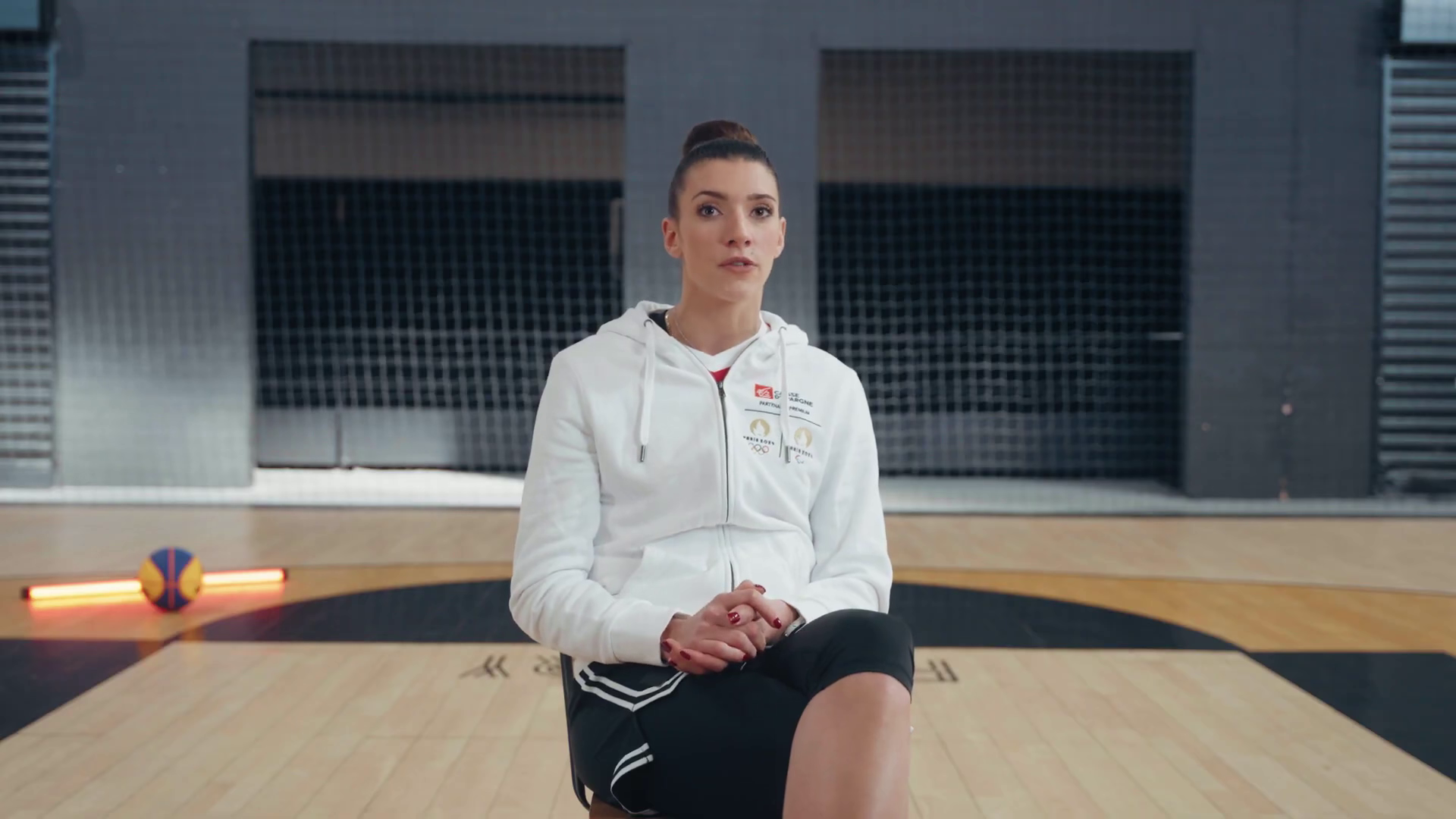

No. 21 – Bourges
- Position: Shooting guard
- League: La Boulangère Wonderligue

Personal information
- Born: 25 October 1995 (age 31) Clermont-Ferrand, France
- Listed height: 6 ft 0 in (1.83 m)

Career information
- Playing career: 2013–present

Career history
- 2013–2016: Cavigal Nice
- 2016–2017: Roannais
- 2017–2018: Reims
- 2018–2020: Charnay
- 2020–2023: Bourges
- 2024–present: Bourges

Career highlights
- FIBA 3x3 World Cup winner (2022); FIBA 3x3 Europe Cup winner (2022); Alain Gilles Trophy (2022)
Medals
Representing France
Women's basketball
U20 EuroBasket
| Gold medal – first place | 2015 Tinajo/Teguise |
Women's 3x3 basketball
World Cup
| Gold medal – first place | 2022 Antwerp | Team |
| Silver medal – second place | 2023 Vienna | Team |
| Bronze medal – third place | 2019 Amsterdam | Team |
Europe Cup
| Gold medal – first place | 2018 Bucharest |
| Gold medal – first place | 2019 Debrecen |
| Gold medal – first place | 2022 Graz |
| Bronze medal – third place | 2021 Paris |

Laëtitia Guapo (born 25 October 1995) is a French basketball player who plays as a shooting guard.

== Early life and career ==
Born in Clermont-Ferrand to a footballer father of Spanish origin and a basketball player mother, Guapo followed her mother's path at the La Roche-Blanche club, in the Clermont-Ferrand metropolitan area. She joined the renowned Stade Clermontois club and the CREPS of Vichy, then the INSEP. · Her parents were initially opposed to her leaving for Vichy in 2008, at the age of 12, before being convinced to by Isabelle Fijalkowski.

== Professional career ==
Having limited playing time with Cavigal Nice, Guapo returned to Ligue 2 in Roannais, then to Reims and finally to Charnay where she won (after the one in 2015 with Nice) her second Ligue 2 championship.

With an excellent first season in LFB with Charnay (12.5 points, 5.8 rebounds and 4 assists per game, leading her team in all three categories), Guapo signed for the EuroLeague club Bourges. With 4 wins and 12 losses, Charnay was in a good position to secure survival before the season was interrupted early due to the COVID-19 pandemic.

For her first match in Tango colors, a 74 to 62 victory against Lyon, Guapo was the top scorer with 22 points and the best rebounder (6) of her team despite losing 5 balls. In 2020, she signed for six years with Tango Bourges.

== National 3x3 team career ==
Guapo discovered 3x3 basketball in 2016 while she was at INSEP.

At the end of 2016, while a STAPS student at Jean Monnet University in Saint-Étienne, Guapo won the 3x3 university world title in China with Caroline Hériaud by hitting a two-point shot in overtime. Spotted by FFBB coach Richard Billant, she was invited to a training camp in Voiron in June 2017.

The coach of the French teams Karim Souchu asked Guapo for the U23 Nations League final, but she had to give up, as she was primarily focused on her PE teacher profession. She only revealed herself in 2019 with two international medals and winner of the Women's Series with Mamignan Touré and Ana-Maria Filip.

Due to a particular selection method, France must however play a qualifying tournament to participate in the Tokyo Olympic Games. This pre-Olympic tournament was postponed from March 2020 in India to May 2021 in Austria. In the spring of 2020, she was world number 1 in 3x3.

In May 2021, Guapo was a member of the 3x3 French team that qualified for the Tokyo Olympic tournament, with Hortense Limouzin, Myriam Djekoundade and Marie-Ève Paget. France then lost the bronze medal match in the tournament. She was ranked the best player in the world for the year.

The following year in Antwerp, Guapo became world champion within the same team. Captaining the team, she was named best player of the competition. She also won the Alain Gilles Trophy for the best player in France.

While playing five-a-side basketball for Tango Bourges, Guapo was made available to the French federation for a year to prepare for the Olympic Games in 3x3 basketball. Indeed, she could not play it permanently, as the sport was not professionalized; in France at the beginning of the 2020s, it was only possible to make a living from five-a-side basketball.

Guapo participated in the women's 3x3 basketball tournament at the 2024 Summer Olympics, in Yann Julien's selection. Her partner, Franck Seguela, was a member of the French men's team in the same sport, and they organized training camps for young people together.

== Player profile ==
In addition to her aggressive attacking game, Guapo has exceptional physical endurance qualities for a basketball player, being able to run 10,000 meters in 35 minutes, which is an asset for three-player games.
