= Akademik Sofia =

Akademik Sofia (Bulgarian: “Академик София”) or Academic (in English) is the name of several sports clubs from Sofia, Bulgaria. It may refer to:

- PFC Akademik Sofia, an association football club.
- PBC Academic, a men's basketball club.
- WBC Akademik Sofia, a women's basketball club.
- Akademika Sofia, an ice hockey club.
- VC Akademik Sofia, a women's volleyball club.
