= Rudy Gobert =

French basketball player (born 1992)

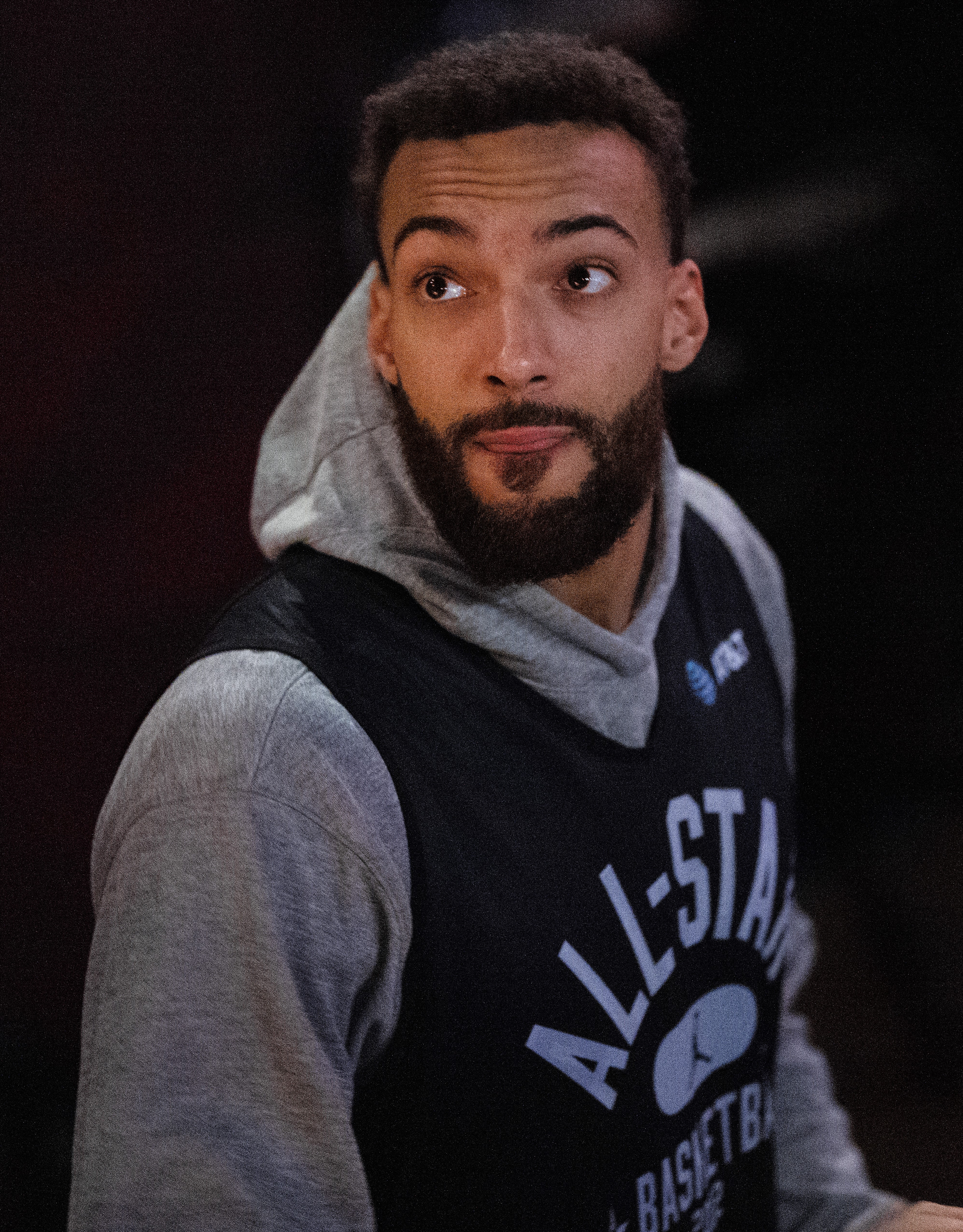
- Gobert at the 2022 NBA All-Star Game

No. 27 – Minnesota Timberwolves
- Position: Center
- League: NBA

Personal information
- Born: June 26, 1992 (age 34) Saint-Quentin, France
- Listed height: 7 ft 1 in (2.16 m)
- Listed weight: 258 lb (117 kg)

Career information
- NBA draft: 2013: 1st round, 27th overall pick
- Drafted by: Denver Nuggets
- Playing career: 2011–present

Career history
- 2011–2013: Cholet
- 2013–2022: Utah Jazz
- 2013–2014: →Bakersfield Jam
- 2022–present: Minnesota Timberwolves

Career highlights
- 3× NBA All-Star (2020–2022); All-NBA Second Team (2017); 3× All-NBA Third Team (2019–2021); 4× NBA Defensive Player of the Year (2018, 2019, 2021, 2024); 8× NBA All-Defensive First Team (2017–2022, 2024, 2026); NBA All-Defensive Second Team (2025); NBA rebounding leader (2022); NBA blocks leader (2017); French player of the year (2019)
- Stats at NBA.com
- Stats at Basketball Reference
Medals
Men's basketball
Representing France
Summer Olympics
Silver medal – second place	2020 Tokyo	Team
Silver medal – second place	2024 Paris	Team
World Cup
Bronze medal – third place	2014 Spain
Bronze medal – third place	2019 China
EuroBasket
Silver medal – second place	2022 Czech Republic–Georgia–Italy–Germany
Bronze medal – third place	2015 France–Croatia–Germany–Latvia

Rudy Gobert-Bourgarel (/ɡoʊˈbɛər/ goh-BAIR, French: [ʁydi gobɛʁ]; born June 26, 1992) is a French professional basketball player for the Minnesota Timberwolves of the National Basketball Association (NBA). He previously played for the Utah Jazz who acquired him during the 2013 NBA draft. Gobert also represents the French national team in its international competitions. Standing at 7 ft 1 in (2.16 m) tall with a wingspan of 7 ft 9 in (2.36 m) long, he plays the center position. He is regarded as one of the best defensive players of all time.

Gobert has won the NBA Defensive Player of the Year award four times, tied for the most in NBA history with Dikembe Mutombo and Ben Wallace. He is a four-time All-NBA Team member, eight-time All-Defensive First Team member, and three-time NBA All-Star. Gobert was also the NBA blocks leader in the 2016–17 season and the NBA rebounding leader in the 2021–22 season. Gobert was named to the All-NBA Second Team in 2017, and the All-NBA Third Team in 2019, 2020 and 2021.

In March 2020, Gobert tested positive for COVID-19, becoming the first NBA player with a confirmed case of the virus. After teammates of Gobert's on the Utah Jazz, including Donovan Mitchell, also tested positive, the NBA postponed the 2019–20 season until its resumption on July 30 of the same year.

== Early life ==
Gobert was born in Saint-Quentin, Aisne, in the north of France. His father, Rudy Bourgarel, is from the French overseas department of Guadeloupe and played college basketball in the United States for the Marist Red Foxes from 1985 to 1988. Bourgarel played professional basketball in Paris and Saint-Quentin, where he met Gobert's mother. Gobert's parents split when he was around three years old; he stayed with his mother in Saint-Quentin and made regular trips to Guadeloupe for his father. Gobert started playing basketball in 2003 for the JSC St-Quentin club, before later joining the Saint-Quentin BB club. In 2007, he joined Cholet Basket's cadet categories training center and in 2010, he participated in the FIBA Europe Under-18 Championship with the French under-18 national team, where he finished as the team's best scorer and rebounder.

== Professional career ==
=== Cholet (2011–2013) ===
From 2009 to 2011, Gobert mostly played for the Cholet Basket junior team, managing just one game for the senior team in 2010–11, recording 6 points, 5 rebounds, 1 steal and 1 block in 13 minutes on May 10, 2011, against Pau-Lacq-Orthez. In 2011–12, he averaged 4.2 points and 3.6 rebounds per game in 29 games for Cholet. During the next season in 2012–13, he averaged 8.4 points and 5.4 rebounds per game in 27 games.

=== Utah Jazz (2013–2022) ===
==== 2013–14 season: Rookie season ====
Gobert declared for the 2013 NBA draft and set NBA Draft Combine records for wingspan (7 feet 8 1/2 inches) and standing reach (9 feet 7 inches) in the 2013 combine. These dimensions earned him the nickname "The Stifle Tower". The record for wingspan was broken a year later by Walter Tavares.

On June 27, 2013, Gobert was selected with the 27th overall pick by the Denver Nuggets. He was later traded on draft night to the Utah Jazz. On July 6, he signed his rookie scale contract with the Jazz and joined them for the 2013 NBA Summer League. In just his 12th game for the Jazz on November 24, Gobert scored a season-high 10 points against the Oklahoma City Thunder. On December 14, he was assigned to the Bakersfield Jam of the NBA Development League. Gobert was a starter in all eight of his games in the Development League, scoring a double-double in six of those games.

He was later recalled by the Jazz on December 21, reassigned on January 4, and recalled again on January 13. He played sparingly for the Jazz in 2013–14, making an appearance in 45 of the team's 82 regular-season games.

==== 2014–15 season: Improving as a sophomore ====
In July 2014, Gobert re-joined the Jazz for the 2014 NBA Summer League. On October 24, 2014, the Jazz exercised their third-year team option on Gobert's rookie-scale contract, extending the contract through the 2015–16 season. On January 9, 2015, he had seven blocks in a loss to the Oklahoma City Thunder. On March 3, he recorded 15 points and a career-high 24 rebounds in a 93–82 win over the Memphis Grizzlies. His 24 rebounds were three short of the Jazz franchise record of 27 set twice by Truck Robinson, both in the 1977–78 season. In April 2015, he twice scored a career-high 20 points, and finished the 2014–15 season with 25 double-doubles. He went on to finish third in the NBA Most Improved Player Award voting.

==== 2015–16 season: Full-time starter ====
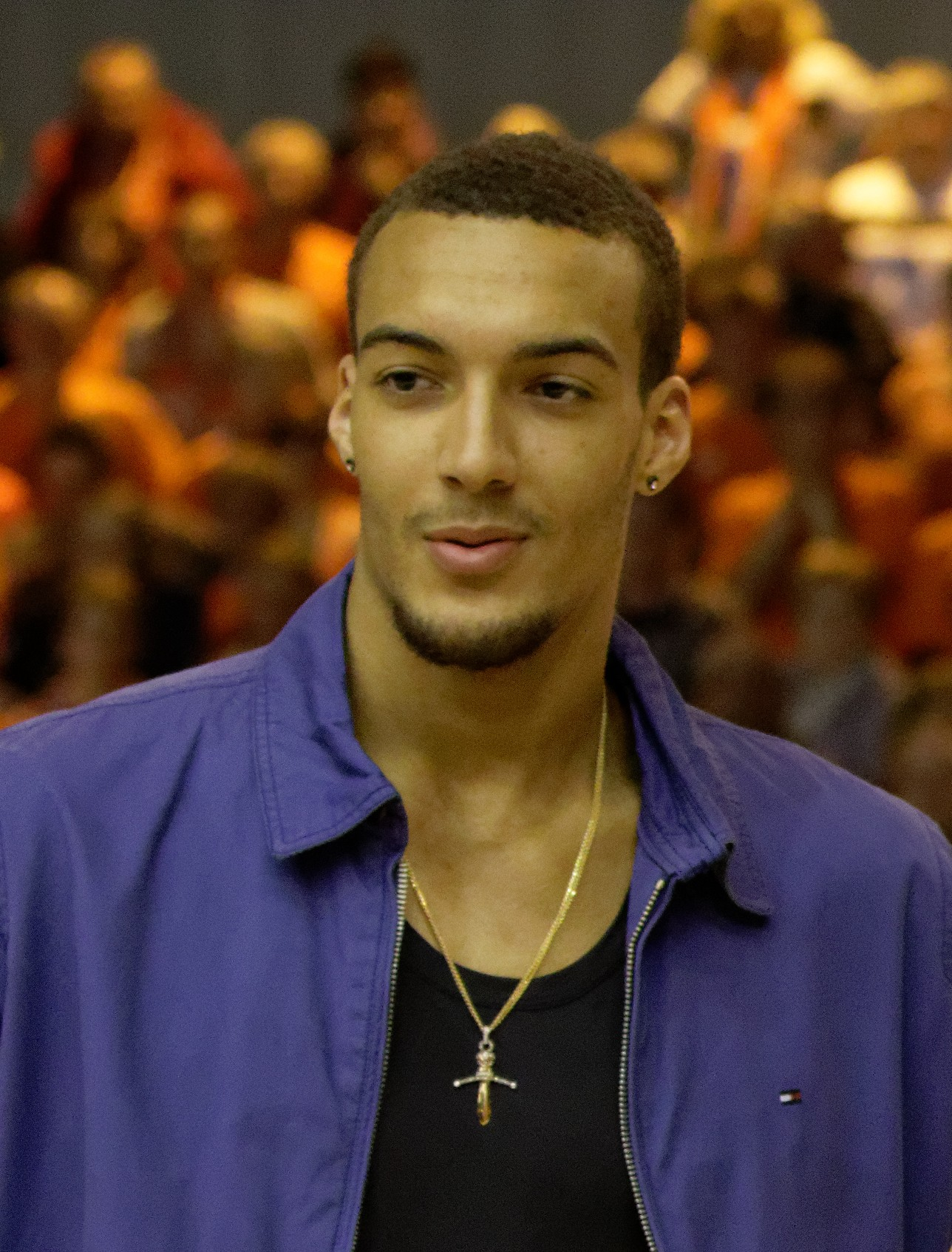
Gobert in 2015

On October 17, 2015, the Jazz exercised their fourth-year team option on Gobert's rookie-scale contract, extending the contract through the 2016–17 season. On December 2, 2015, he was ruled out indefinitely after sustaining a sprained left MCL. He returned to action on January 7, 2016, against the Houston Rockets after missing 18 games with the injury. He was limited to just 15 minutes but chipped in six points and three rebounds. On January 16, he had a season-best game with 18 points, 18 rebounds and 5 blocks in a 109–82 win over the Los Angeles Lakers. On February 27, he recorded 12 points, a season-high 19 rebounds and six blocks in a 98–96 loss to the Brooklyn Nets.

==== 2016–17 season: First All-NBA appearance and blocks leader ====
On October 31, 2016, Gobert signed a four-year, $102 million contract extension with the Jazz, which at the time made him the best paid French athlete ever (in terms of salary per year). On December 6, 2016, he scored a career-high 22 points in a 112–105 win over the Phoenix Suns. Four days later, he had 17 points, 14 rebounds and a season-high six blocks in a 104–84 win over the Sacramento Kings. On January 10, 2017, in a win over the Cleveland Cavaliers, Gobert posted his franchise-best 25th consecutive game with 10-plus rebounds (14). On January 20, 2017, he recorded career highs of 27 points and 25 rebounds in a 112–107 overtime win over the Dallas Mavericks. The following day, he had his 31st double-double of the season with 19 points and 11 rebounds in a 109–100 win over the Indiana Pacers. His 11 rebounds marked his 30th straight game with at least 10 rebounds—only four other NBA players have had a 30-game streak of 10-rebound games since 1997–98. His streak ended at 30 after falling one rebound shy of his 31st consecutive 10-plus rebound game on January 23 against the Oklahoma City Thunder. With two blocks against New Orleans on February 8, Gobert reached 499 career blocked shots, passing Rich Kelley (498) for ninth on the franchise's all-time block list. On March 5, he had 16 points and 24 rebounds and tipped in a missed shot as time expired in overtime to lift the Jazz to a 110–109 win over the Sacramento Kings. On March 20, he had 16 points, 14 rebounds and a career-high eight blocks in a 107–100 loss to the Indiana Pacers. Two days later, he scored a career-high 35 points and grabbed 13 rebounds in a 108–101 win over the New York Knicks. Eleven of his 13 rebounds were offensive.

In Game 1 of the Jazz's first-round playoff series against the Los Angeles Clippers on April 15, Gobert suffered a hyperextension and bone bruise to his left knee; the injury occurred on the first possession of the game. Utah took Game 1 without him, but he went on to miss Games 2 and 3, as the Jazz went down 2–1 in the series. Gobert returned to the line-up for Game 4 and contributed to a 105–98 win with 15 points and 13 rebounds. The Jazz went on to eliminate the Clippers with a 104–91 victory in Game 7, closing out the first-round series 4–3 to earn the franchise's first postseason victory since 2010. However, they were swept by the Golden State Warriors in the second round to bow out of the playoffs. At the season's end, Gobert was named in the All-NBA Second Team for the first time in his career. He also earned NBA All-Defensive First Team honors.

==== 2017–18 season: First DPOY award ====
Gobert began the 2017–18 season with eight double-doubles while averaging a league-best 2.5 blocks per game. On November 12, 2017, he was ruled out for four-to-six weeks with a bone bruise in his right knee. He returned earlier than expected, re-joining the squad on December 4 after missing 11 games. However, after suffering a sprained posterior cruciate ligament (PCL) in his left knee and a bone bruise on December 15, he was ruled out for at least another two weeks. He returned to action on January 19, recording 23 points, 14 rebounds and three blocks in a 117–115 loss to the New York Knicks. On March 2, 2018, he scored a season-high 26 points and grabbed 16 rebounds in a 116–108 win over the Minnesota Timberwolves. In May 2018, he was named in the NBA All-Defensive First Team, becoming the third Jazz player ever to earn multiple All-Defensive First Team recognitions, alongside Karl Malone (1997, 1998 and 1999) and Mark Eaton (1985, 1986 and 1989). In June, he was named the NBA Defensive Player of the Year, becoming the first Jazz player to win the award since two-time honoree Mark Eaton last won the award in 1989, the fifth international to win the award, the second French man to win the award, the first French-born to win the award, and the 12th center to win the award.

==== 2018–19 season: Second DPOY award ====
On December 25, 2018, Gobert recorded a season-high seven blocks in a 117–96 win over the Portland Trail Blazers. On December 29, he had a team-high 25 points on 10-of-12 shooting and grabbed 16 rebounds for his 31st double-double of the season in a 129–97 win over the New York Knicks. He had 24 points and 12 rebounds at half time, marking the first time that a Jazz player totaled at least 20 points and 10 rebounds in any half since Carlos Boozer did it in February 2010. On January 12, 2019, he had a career-high eight assists in a 110–102 win over the Chicago Bulls. On January 14, he tied a career high with 25 rebounds in a 100–94 win over the Detroit Pistons. On January 16, he had 23 points and 22 rebounds in a 129–109 win over the Los Angeles Clippers. On March 18, he was named Western Conference Player of the Week, marking his first career player of the week honor. On March 25, he scored a season-high 27 points and set the single-season NBA dunk record in a 125–92 win over the Phoenix Suns. With his 270th dunk of the season, he bested Dwight Howard's 269 dunks in 2007–08. He finished the regular season with a record 306 dunks and went on to lead the NBA in dunks for four consecutive seasons (2018–2019 through 2021–2022). At the NBA's end-of-season awards night, Gobert was named the NBA's Defensive Player of the Year for the second season in a row.

Gobert won the Alain Gilles Trophy as the French player of the year for 2019. With this he became the 10th multi-time winner of the award, and the 9th ever to win back-to-back.

==== 2019–20 season: First All-Star appearance ====
Through his first 45 games in the 2019–20 season, Gobert averaged 15.7 points and 14.6 rebounds per game and had become an anchor for the Jazz on offense as well as defense. On January 30, 2020, Gobert, alongside teammate Donovan Mitchell, was named a Western Conference reserve for the 2020 NBA All-Star Game.

On March 11, 2020, a game between the Utah Jazz and the Oklahoma City Thunder was postponed right before tip-off after Gobert was placed on the injury list due to illness. He was taken to a local hospital and tested positive for SARS-CoV-2, the virus responsible for the COVID-19 pandemic. The NBA then suspended the season indefinitely. Just two days earlier, after a game against the Pistons in Detroit, Gobert had facetiously touched every microphone and recorder at a press conference concerning the Utah Jazz's response to the virus. Gobert apologized, saying his actions were careless and exposed others to the disease and that he hopes his story serves as a warning to others to take the virus seriously. On March 27, he was cleared of the coronavirus. In April, it was reported that his relationship with Mitchell had soured following his careless behavior when infected with COVID-19 and Gobert admitted the two did not speak for some time after. Gobert has donated $500,000 to help people affected by COVID-19 including part-time employees and COVID-related services.

==== 2020–21 season: Third DPOY award and best record in the NBA ====
On December 20, 2020, Gobert signed a five-year, $205 million contract extension with the Jazz. Gobert's extension was the third-largest contract in NBA history, and the largest ever for a center.

On February 23, 2021, Gobert, alongside teammate Donovan Mitchell, was once again named a Western Conference reserve for the 2021 NBA All-Star Game, marking the pair's second consecutive All-Star selection. On March 22, Gobert logged 21 points, 10 rebounds and a career-high nine blocks in 120–95 victory over the Chicago Bulls. On June 9, 2021, Gobert was named the NBA Defensive Player of the Year for the third time in four years, making him the fourth player in NBA history to win the award three or more times. Gobert's win marked the first time in NBA history where four consecutive defensive player of the year awards had been won by international players. On June 11, Gobert recorded a playoff career-high 20 rebounds in a Game 2 second-round victory over the Los Angeles Clippers.

==== 2021–22 season: First rebounding title ====
On February 3, 2022, Gobert was named a reserve for the 2022 NBA All-Star Game. He finished third in Defensive Player of the Year voting, behind winner Marcus Smart and Mikal Bridges. Gobert led the league in rebounds per game with 14.7 rebound per game and was third in blocks per game with 2.1 blocks per game, Gobert as well lead the league in FG% with 71.3% FG and shot a career high from the free throw line. On May 20, Gobert was named to his sixth straight NBA All-Defensive First Team.

=== Minnesota Timberwolves (2022–present) ===
==== 2022–23 season: First season in Minneapolis ====
On July 6, 2022, Gobert was traded to the Minnesota Timberwolves for Patrick Beverley, Malik Beasley, Jarred Vanderbilt, Leandro Bolmaro, and the draft rights to center Walker Kessler in addition to four first-round picks and a 2026 first-round pick swap. On October 20, Gobert made his Timberwolves debut, putting up 23 points and 16 rebounds in a 115–108 win over the Oklahoma City Thunder. On October 28, Gobert recorded 22 points and 21 rebounds in an 111–102 win over the Los Angeles Lakers; that was his 8th career 20/20 game and first in Minnesota. On January 6, 2023, Gobert logged 25 points and 21 rebounds on 11-of-15 shooting from the field in a 128–115 win over the Los Angeles Clippers. On March 3, Gobert had 22 points and 14 rebounds in a 110–102 win over the Los Angeles Lakers. On April 9, he was involved in a physical altercation with teammate Kyle Anderson during a game against the New Orleans Pelicans. Gobert swung at Anderson after a verbal exchange on the sideline, after which Gobert was escorted away. The incident took place during the second quarter, and Gobert was subsequently sent home early from the game. The next day, it was announced that he would be suspended for one game as a result of the incident.

==== 2023–24 season: Fourth DPOY and first Conference Finals ====
On November 14, 2023, Gobert was involved in an altercation in a game against the Golden State Warriors in which during a team brawl, Gobert entered the brawl to separate Warriors guard Klay Thompson and teammate Jaden McDaniels. Warriors forward Draymond Green put Gobert into a chokehold and pulled him away from the fight while Gobert was trying to separate the two players. This resulted in Green, along with Thompson and McDaniels, being ejected from the game for their participation in the brawl. Gobert later called out Green's actions as "clown behavior".

On December 2, Gobert scored a personal season-high 26 points on 10-of-12 shooting along with 12 rebounds and 3 blocks in 123–117 win over the Charlotte Hornets. Gobert was named Defensive Player of the Year, after anchoring Minnesota's #1 ranked defense. This was the fourth time he won the award, which ties Dikembe Mutombo and Ben Wallace for the most in NBA history. Gobert also became the first player in Timberwolves history to win Defensive Player of the Year honors.

On May 7, 2024, Gobert missed a significant playoff game against the Denver Nuggets due to the birth of his child. Despite his absence, the Timberwolves, led by Anthony Edwards and Karl-Anthony Towns, each scoring 27 points, managed to secure a 2–0 series lead over the defending champions, holding the Nuggets to a 34.9% shooting from the field. The Timberwolves reached the conference finals against the Dallas Mavericks, but lost in 5 games. Luka Dončić scored the game winning shot over Gobert in Game 2 after an Edwards turn-over.

==== 2024–25 season: Contract extension ====
On October 23, 2024, Gobert signed a three-year, $110 million contract extension with the Timberwolves.

On April 30, 2025, in Game 5 of the first round against the Los Angeles Lakers, Gobert recorded a double-double of 27 points and 24 rebounds, both playoff career highs, in a 103–96 victory, helping the Timberwolves win playoff rounds in consecutive seasons for the first time in franchise history. He joined Kevin Garnett as the only players in Timberwolves history to record a 20–20 game in the NBA playoffs. The Minnesota Timberwolves reached the conference finals for the second consecutive time, facing the Oklahoma City Thunder, but lost the series in five games.

==== 2025–26 season: Eighth All-Defensive First Team selection ====
On March 25, 2026, Gobert recorded 14 points, 14 rebounds and 5 blocks in 110–108 overtime victory over the Houston Rockets, marking his 30th double-double of the season and his 10th consecutive season with 30-plus double-doubles, tied with Denver's Nikola Jokić for the NBA's longest active streak.

On May 22, Gobert was named to his eighth NBA All-Defensive First Team, tying him for the second-most First Team selections in NBA history. He became only the second player in franchise history to be named to an All-Defensive Team at least three times, joining Kevin Garnett. Gobert also became the seventh player in NBA history to average at least 10 points, 10 rebounds and 1 block in ten straight seasons since blocks were officially tracked in 1973–74. He joined Dwight Howard (14), Shaquille O'Neal (13), Tim Duncan (13), Hakeem Olajuwon (12), Moses Malone (11) and Dikembe Mutombo (11).

== Personal life ==
On February 21, 2024, Gobert announced that he was expecting a child with Julia Bonilla. He missed Minnesota's play-off victory against Denver on May 6 for the birth of their son.

== Awards and honors ==
NBA

- 3× NBA All-Star: 2020–2022
- 4x All-NBA Team selections:
  - All-NBA Second Team: 2017
  - 3× All-NBA Third Team: 2019–2021
- 4× NBA Defensive Player of the Year: 2018, 2019, 2021, 2024
- 9x NBA All-Defensive Team selections:
  - 8× All-Defensive First Team: 2017–2022, 2024, 2026
  - All-Defensive Second Team: 2025
- NBA rebounding leader: 2022
- NBA blocks leader: 2017

French Basketball

- 2x Olympics silver medalist: 2020, 2024
- Olympics All-Star Five: 2020
- 2x FIBA World Cup bronze medalist: 2014, 2019
- EuroBasket silver medalist: 2022
- EuroBasket bronze medalist: 2015
- EuroBasket All-Tournament Team: 2022
- French player of the year: 2019

== NBA career statistics ==
Legend
GP	Games played	GS	Games started	MPG	Minutes per game
FG%	Field goal percentage	3P%	3-point field goal percentage	FT%	Free throw percentage
RPG	Rebounds per game	APG	Assists per game	SPG	Steals per game
BPG	Blocks per game	PPG	Points per game	**Bold**	Career high
*	Led the league	‡	NBA record

=== Regular season ===
Year	Team	GP	GS	MPG	FG%	3P%	FT%	RPG	APG	SPG	BPG	PPG
2013–14	Utah	45	0	9.6	.486	—	.492	3.4	.2	.2	.9	2.3
2014–15	Utah	**82**	37	26.3	.604	.000	.623	9.5	1.3	**.8**	2.3	8.4
2015–16	Utah	61	60	31.7	.559	—	.569	11.0	1.5	.7	2.2	9.1
2016–17	Utah	81	**81**	33.9	.661	.000	.653	12.8	1.2	.6	2.6*	14.0
2017–18	Utah	56	56	32.4	.615	—	.681	10.7	1.4	**.8**	2.3	13.5
2018–19	Utah	81	80	31.8	.669*	—	.636	12.9	**2.0**	**.8**	2.3	**15.9**
2019–20	Utah	68	68	**34.3**	.693	—	.630	13.5	1.5	**.8**	2.0	15.1
2020–21	Utah	71	71	30.8	.675*	.000	.623	13.5	1.3	.6	**2.7**	14.3
2021–22	Utah	66	66	32.1	**.713***	.000	**.690**	**14.7***	1.1	.7	2.1	15.6
2022–23	Minnesota	70	70	30.7	.659	.000	.644	11.6	1.2	**.8**	1.4	13.4
2023–24	Minnesota	76	76	34.1	.661	.000	.638	12.9	1.3	.7	2.1	14.0
2024–25	Minnesota	72	72	33.2	.669	—	.674	10.9	1.8	**.8**	1.4	12.0
2025–26	Minnesota	76	76	31.3	.682*	.000	.526	11.5	1.7	**.8**	1.6	10.9
Career		905	813	30.7	.658	.000	.633	11.7	1.4	.7	2.0	12.5
All-Star		3	0	14.9	.900‡	—	.333	8.0	1.0	.3	.3	12.3

=== Playoffs ===
Year	Team	GP	GS	MPG	FG%	3P%	FT%	RPG	APG	SPG	BPG	PPG
2017	Utah	9	9	27.3	.635	—	.480	9.9	1.2	1.0	1.3	11.6
2018	Utah	11	11	34.8	.655	—	.603	10.7	1.0	.9	2.3	13.2
2019	Utah	5	5	30.4	.594	—	**.783**	10.2	1.4	.6	**2.6**	11.2
2020	Utah	7	7	**38.6**	.649	—	.524	11.4	1.1	.6	1.4	**16.9**
2021	Utah	11	11	34.2	**.741**	.000	.636	12.3	.8	.5	2.1	14.7
2022	Utah	6	6	32.8	.646	—	.682	**13.2**	.5	.2	1.0	12.0
2023	Minnesota	5	5	35.4	.630	—	.630	12.2	2.0	.4	1.0	15.0
2024	Minnesota	**15**	**15**	34.2	.615	—	.671	9.8	1.6	.9	1.0	12.1
2025	Minnesota	**15**	**15**	27.4	.582	—	.520	8.6	.7	.5	1.2	7.9
2026	Minnesota	12	12	31.0	.493	.000	.474	9.3	**2.3**	**1.2**	1.1	7.2
Career		96	96	32.3	.626	.000	.597	10.4	1.3	.7	1.5	11.6

== National team career ==
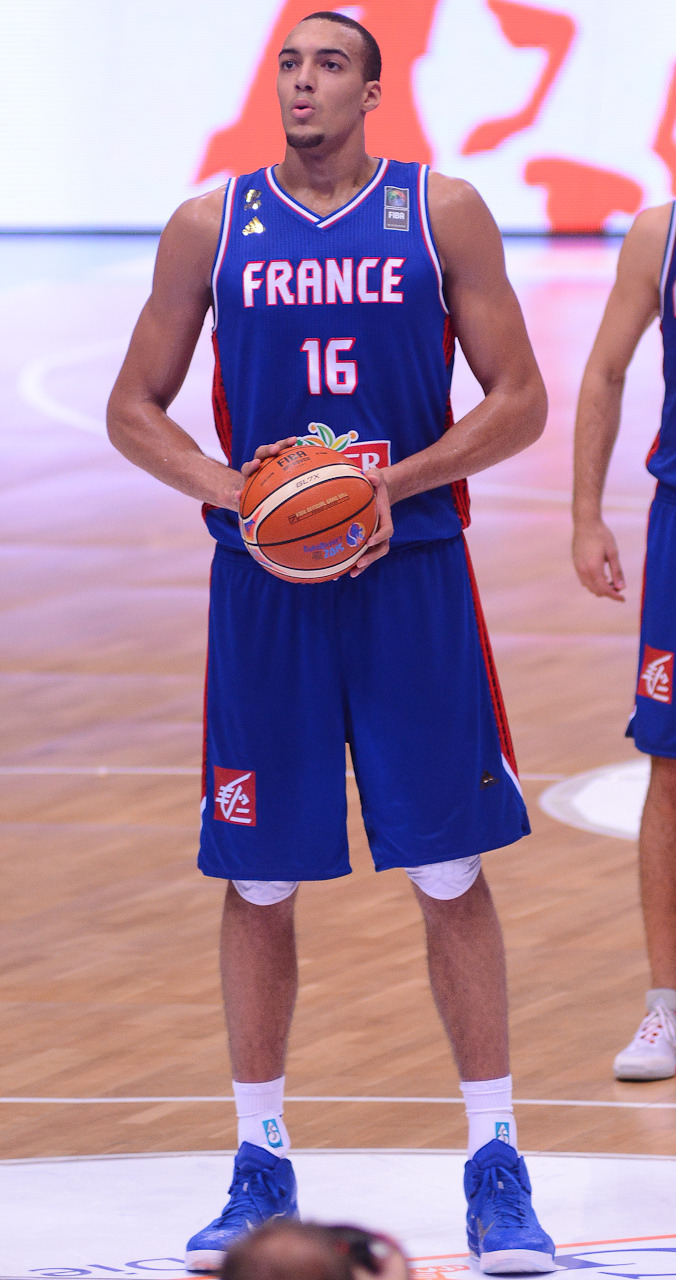
Gobert with France in 2015

=== Junior national team ===
Gobert won the bronze medal at the 2011 FIBA Europe Under-20 Championship and the silver medal at the 2012 FIBA Europe Under-20 Championship. In the 2012 edition, Gobert was named to the All-Tournament team alongside countryman, Léo Westermann.

=== Senior national team ===
Gobert was called by head coach Vincent Collet to help the senior French national team prepare for the 2012 Summer Olympics tournament. He played two friendly games, scoring 8 points. He was part of the team that won the bronze medal at the 2014 FIBA World Cup, where he averaged 4.1 points per game.

In 2015, he helped France to bronze at the EuroBasket 2015, averaging 10.4 points, 8.1 rebounds and 2.0 blocks during the tournament, while receiving All-European Championships Second Team distinction's from the website Eurobasket.com.

At the 2016 Olympic Games in Rio de Janeiro, Gobert played in five games for France, tallying 5.7 points, 7.2 rebounds and 1.8 blocks per game. He also won the bronze medal with France at the 2019 FIBA World Cup, where he averaged 10.1 points, 9.1 rebounds, 1.8 assists, 0.6 steals and 1.9 blocks per game.

In the 2020 Olympic Games in Tokyo, Gobert guided France to a silver medal, starting each game and averaging 12.2 points and 9.3 rebounds.

In 2022, he led France to silver at the EuroBasket 2022, averaging 12.8 points, 9.8 rebounds and 1.2 blocks during the tournament, while being selected to the All-Tournament Team.

In the 2024 Olympic Games in Paris, Gobert won a silver medal with France, averaging 3.3 points, 4.0 rebounds and 1.3 blocks per game.

== See also ==
- List of NBA career rebounding leaders
- List of NBA career blocks leaders
- List of NBA career field goal percentage leaders
- List of NBA annual rebounding leaders
- List of NBA annual blocks leaders
- List of NBA single-season rebounding leaders
- List of NBA postseason records
