= 2024–25 Bulgarian Women's Basketball Championship =

Women's basketball league in Bulgaria

Bulgarian Women's Basketball Championship
- Season: 2024–25
- Dates: Regular season: 12 October 2024 – 5 January 2025; Winners and losers stage: 11 January – 6 April 2025; Play Offs: 7–18 April 2025
- Teams: 6

Regular season
- Season MVP: (Venezuela) Daniela Wallen

Finals
- Champions: Montana 2003 (4th title)
- Runners-up: Beroe Stara Zagora
- Finals MVP: (Venezuela) Daniela Wallen

Statistical leaders
Points	(Venezuela) Daniela Wallen	22.4
Rebounds	(Venezuela) Daniela Wallen	12.8
Assists	(United States) Kiana Johnson	6.3
Steals	(Venezuela) Daniela Wallen	4.8
Blocks	(United States) Sarah Boothe	1.7

The 2024–25 Bulgarian Women's Basketball Championship is the 80th season of the top division women's basketball league in Bulgaria since its establishment in 1945. It starts in October 2024 with the first round of the regular season and ends in April 2025.

Beroe Stara Zagora are the defending champions.

Montana 2003 won their fourth title after beating Beroe Stara Zagora in the final.

== Format ==
In the first round, each team plays each other twice. The top three progress to the winners stage while the bottom three advance to the losers stage. In the winners stage, teams play each other four times and every team makes the play offs. In the losers stage, teams play each other two times and only the fourth place team advances to the semifinals. The semifinals are played as a best of three series while the final is played as a best of five series.

== Regular season ==
Pos	Team	Pld	W	L	PF	PA	PD	Pts	Qualification
1	Montana 2003	10	10	0	931	521	+410	20	Winners stage
2	Beroe Stara Zagora	10	8	2	948	572	+376	18	Winners stage
3	Rilski Sportist	10	6	4	893	621	+272	16	Winners stage
4	Lokomotiv Sofia	10	4	6	675	701	−26	14	Losers stage
5	Champion 2006	10	2	8	539	895	−356	12	Losers stage
6	Academic Plovdiv	10	0	10	476	1152	−676	10	Losers stage

Source: Bulgarian Championship
Rules for classification: 1) Points; 2) Points difference; 3) Points scored.

=== Winners stage ===
Pos	Team	Pld	W	L	PF	PA	PD	Pts	Qualification
1	Montana 2003	18	16	2	1542	1061	+481	34	Play Offs
2	Beroe Stara Zagora	18	14	4	1573	1148	+425	32	Play Offs
3	Rilski Sportist	18	6	12	1361	1209	+152	24	Play Offs

Source: Bulgarian Championship
Rules for classification: 1) Points; 2) Points difference; 3) Points scored.

=== Losers stage ===
Pos	Team	Pld	W	L	PF	PA	PD	Pts	Qualification
4	Lokomotiv Sofia	14	8	6	1048	904	+144	22	Play Offs
5	Champion 2006	14	4	10	833	1158	−325	18	
6	Academic Plovdiv	14	0	14	682	1559	−877	14	

Source: Bulgarian Championship
Rules for classification: 1) Points; 2) Points difference; 3) Points scored.

== Play offs ==
Semifinals	Final
1	Montana 2003	99	102	2
4	Lokomotiv Sofia	41	34	0
1	Montana 2003	69	76	89	71	3
2	Beroe Stara Zagora	84	49	69	67	1
2	Beroe Stara Zagora	70	77	82	2
3	Rilski Sportist	78	68	73	1	Third place
3	Rilski Sportist	87	69	2
4	Lokomotiv Sofia	63	45	0

Champions of Bulgaria

Montana 2003
Fourth title
