= Alain Gilles Trophy =

Annual basketball award

The Alain Gilles Trophy (French: Trophée Alain Gilles) is an annual basketball award that is given to the French basketball player of the year (which can be either male or female), in a given season, regardless of the country that they play club basketball in. The award is named after Alain Gilles, who played in 159 games with the senior men's French national basketball team, and who is considered to be one of the greatest French basketball players of all time. Voters for the winner of the award include French Basketball Federation (FFBB) members, men's and women's French senior national team veterans, and French sports media representatives.

== Winners ==
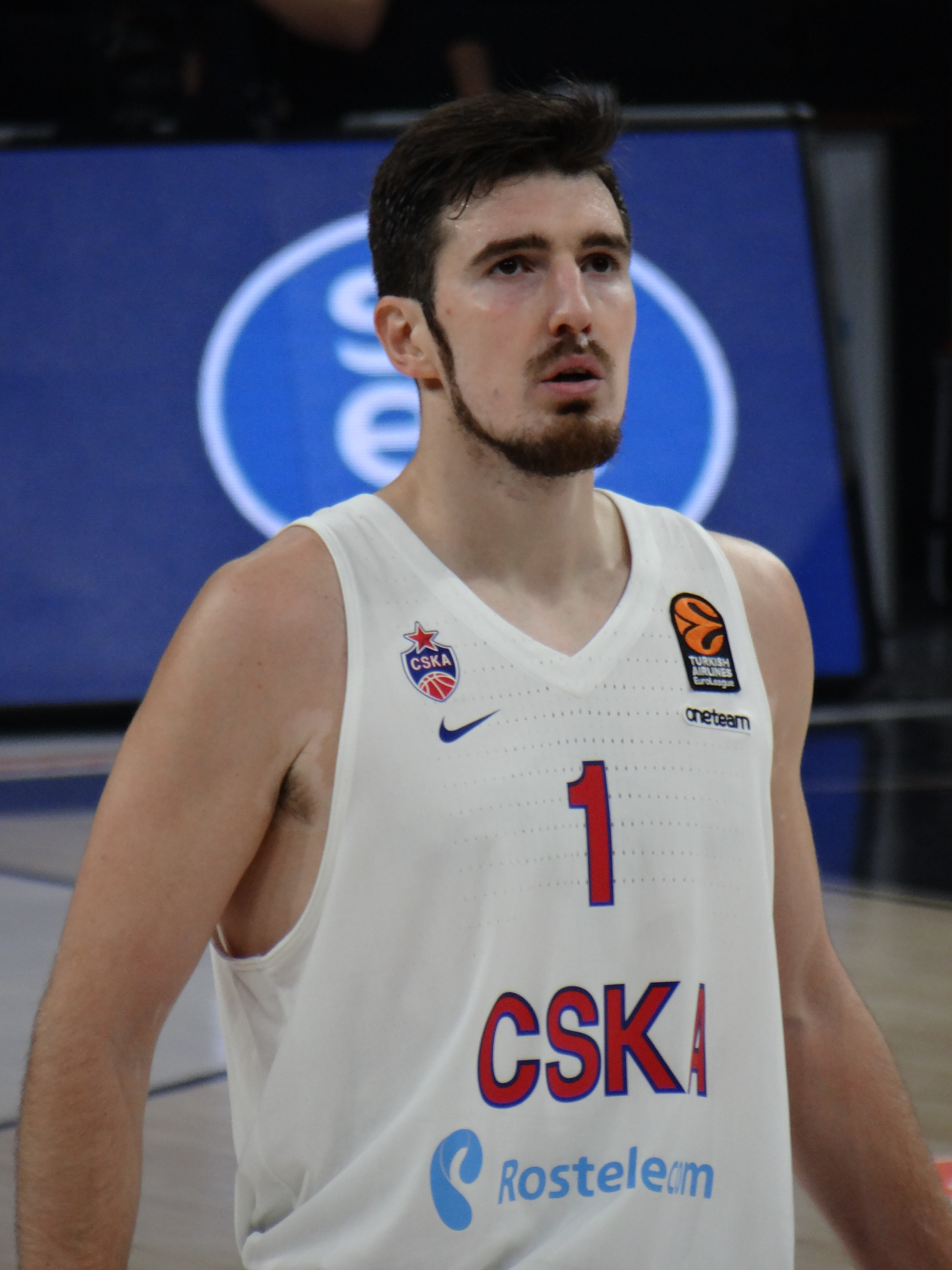
Nando de Colo won the first two Alain Gilles Trophies

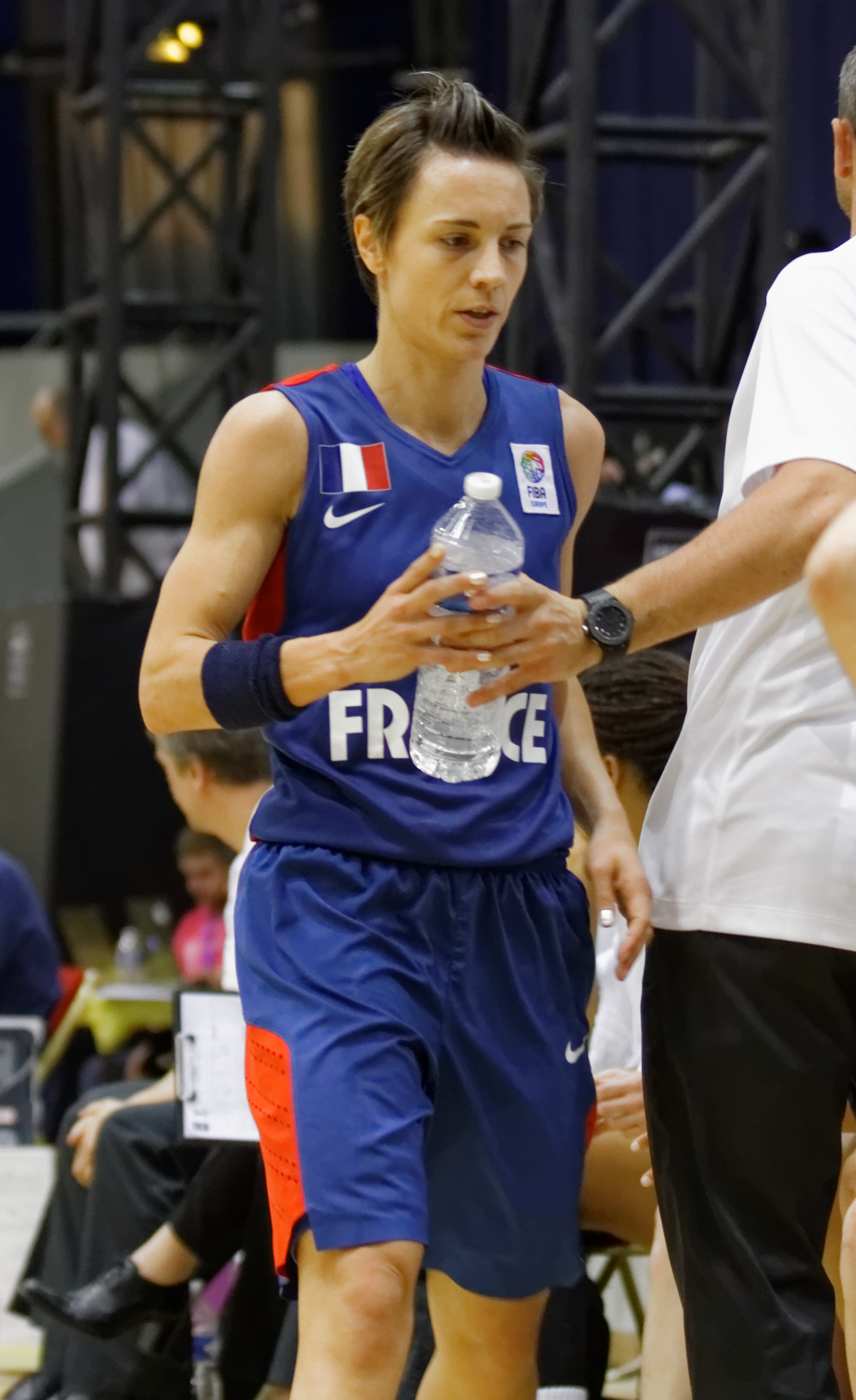
Céline Dumerc was the second player ever to win the award

Key
Player (X)	Name of the player and number of times they had won the award at that point (if more than one)

Season	Player	Pos.	Team	Ref.
2014–15	Nando de Colo	SG	(Russia) CSKA Moscow	
2015–16	Nando de Colo (2)	SG	(Russia) CSKA Moscow	
2016–17	Céline Dumerc	PG	(France) Landes	
2017–18	Fabien Causeur	SG	(Spain) Real Madrid	
2018–19	Rudy Gobert	C	(United States) Utah Jazz	
2020–21	Nicolas Batum	F	(United States) Los Angeles Clippers	
2021–22	Laëtitia Guapo	G	(France) Tango Bourges Basket	
2022–23	Victor Wembanyama	PF	(United States) San Antonio Spurs	
2023–24	Gabby Williams	F	(France) ASVEL	
2024–25	Valériane Ayayi	SF	(Czech Republic) USK Praha	
2025-26	Gabby Williams	F	(United States) Golden State Valkyries	
