= WBC Neftokhimik Burgas =

Bulgarian basketball club

WBC Neftohimik 2010 is a Bulgarian basketball club for women, founded in 1993 in the city Burgas in Bulgaria.

== History ==
The origins of the club in 1993 when at WBC "Neftohimik" based basketball section specialized in female profile. For several seasons the club turns in leading the country. The first success for the club were the bronze medals in season 1997-98 Next year comes the first trophy - the Cup of Bulgaria again and bronze medals in the championship.

== Winners ==
Bulgarian Women's Basketball Championship:

- (5) : 2005, 2006, 2009, 2010 и 2011 г.

Bulgarian Women's Basketball Cup:

- (6) : 1999, 2004, 2005, 2006, 2008 и 2015 г.

South Conference FIBA Europa

- 1/2 finals: 2005
