= Wolfenbüttel Wildcats =

German basketball club

- Dissolved: 2013
- Arena: Doppelturnhalle
- Location: Wolfenbüttel, Germany
- Team colors: White and black
- President: Ralph Bosse
- Championships: 1 German League
- Website: wildcats-baskets.de
Home	Away

Wolfenbüttel Wildcats Baskets was a German women's basketball club from Wolfenbüttel playing in the Bundesliga. It made four appearances in the Ronchetti Cup in the 1990s, and in 2012 it won the national championship for the first time. In June 2013 the club filed for bankruptcy after already having major financial problems during the 2012–13 season. For the 2013–14 season a new club/team with the name Wolfpack Wolfenbüttel was founded, it plays in the second-tier league in Germany.

== Titles ==
- Damen-Basketball-Bundesliga (1)
  - 2012

== 2012–13 Roster ==
- (1.91) (Latvia) Ieva Kulite
- (1.89) (Hungary) Viktoria Vincze
- (1.88) (Germany) Mara Conley
- (1.87) (Germany) Suska Berger
- (1.83) (Germany) Charmaine Callahan
- (1.78) (Germany) Roli-Ann Hardin
- (1.78) (United States) Samantha Whitcomb
- (1.73) (Germany) Corinna Poschel
- (1.72) (United States) Sarah Morton
- (1.71) (United States) Brianne O'Rourke
- (1.68) (Germany) Nina Hartwich
- (1.60) (Germany) Kristina Stapel
- (?.??) (Germany) Anna-Lena Sprenger
