= Lokomotiv RFC =

Bulgarian rugby union club, based in Sofia

- Full name: Lokomotiv RFC
- Founded: 1955; 71 years ago
- Ground: Lokomotiv Stadium (Sofia) (Capacity: 22,000)
- Chairman: (Bulgaria) Jordan Sabkov
- Coach: (Bulgaria) Vladislav Parizov
- Captain: (Bulgaria) Vladislav Parizov
| 1st kit | 2nd kit |

== History ==
The first rugby union club founded in Bulgaria is ZSK Lokomotiv Sofia.

== See also ==
- BC Lokomotiv Sofia
- Lokomotiv RFC
- PFC Lokomotiv Sofia
- WBC Lokomotiv Sofia
