= SC Kremikovtsi =

SC Kremikovtsi was a Bulgarian women's basketball club from the Kremikovtsi district in Sofia. It won five national championships between 1989 and 1999 and appeared in the European Cup and the Ronchetti Cup.

== Titles ==
- Bulgarian Championship
  - 1989, 1993, 1997, 1998, 1999
- Bulgarian Cup
  - 1992, 1993
