= WBC Maritsa Plovdiv =

Bulgarian basketball club

WBC Maritsa Plovdiv is a Bulgarian women's basketball club from Plovdiv. It won three national championships in a row between 1971 and 1974, and in 1980 and 1981 it reached the Ronchetti Cup's final, losing respectively to BC Levski Sofia and Montmontaza Zagreb.

== Titles ==
- Bulgarian Championship (3)
  - 1971, 1972, 1974
- Bulgarian Cup (1)
  - 1996
- Ronchetti Cup Runner-Up (2)
  - 1979, 1980
