= BC Lokomotiv Sofia =

Bulgarian basketball club

(Bulgaria) BC Lokomotiv Sofia
- Nickname: The Railwaymen
- Leagues: NBL
- Founded: 1936
- Arena: Lokomotiv Hall (capacity: 300)
- Location: Sofia, Bulgaria
- Team colors: Red and black
- President: Diana Dilova-Braynova
- Head coach: Ivan Tilev
- Championships: (6) NBL (2) Bulgarian Cup
- Website: scblokomotivsofia.com

BC Lokomotiv Sofia (Bulgarian: БК „Локомотив София“) is a Bulgarian basketball club based in the capital Sofia and part of the Lokomotiv Sofia sports club.

Lokomotiv Sofia have been 6 times champions of Bulgaria and 2 times Bulgarian cup winners. They play their home games at Lokomotiv Hall in Sofia. In 2002 the men's and women's basketball teams were disbanded due to financial difficulties. In 2020 the men's basketball team was restored, playing in Bulgarian second tier.

== Honours ==
- Bulgarian Championships: (6) 1943, 1948, 1955, 1961, 1964, 1966
- Bulgarian Cup: (2) 1956,1966

== History ==
In 1966–67 FIBA European Champions Cup Lokomotiv achieved one of the biggest international victory in Bulgarian basketball by defeating Real Madrid 106-96.

== See also ==
- Lokomotiv RFC
- PFC Lokomotiv Sofia
- WBC Lokomotiv Sofia
