= WBC Dunav Ruse =

Dunav Ruse
- Leagues: Bulgarian league EuroCup Women
- Founded: 1947 (refounded 2004)
- Arena: Dunav Hall
- Location: Ruse, Bulgaria
- Team colors: White and blue
- President: Krasimir Trifonov
- Head coach: Georgi Bozhkov
- Championships: 5 Bulgarian championship 4 Bulgarian cup
- Website: dunav8806.com
Home	Away

WBC Dunav Ruse is a Bulgarian basketball club from Ruse playing in the Bulgarian Championship. It was won two championships and three national cups since 2008, including a double in 2012. It made its debut in FIBA competitions in the 2007-08 Eurocup. In 2008, Dunav Econt won its first Bulgarian women's basketball championship, defeating Lukoil Neftochimic 71–68 in the third victory of the best-of-five final series, which it won 3–1.

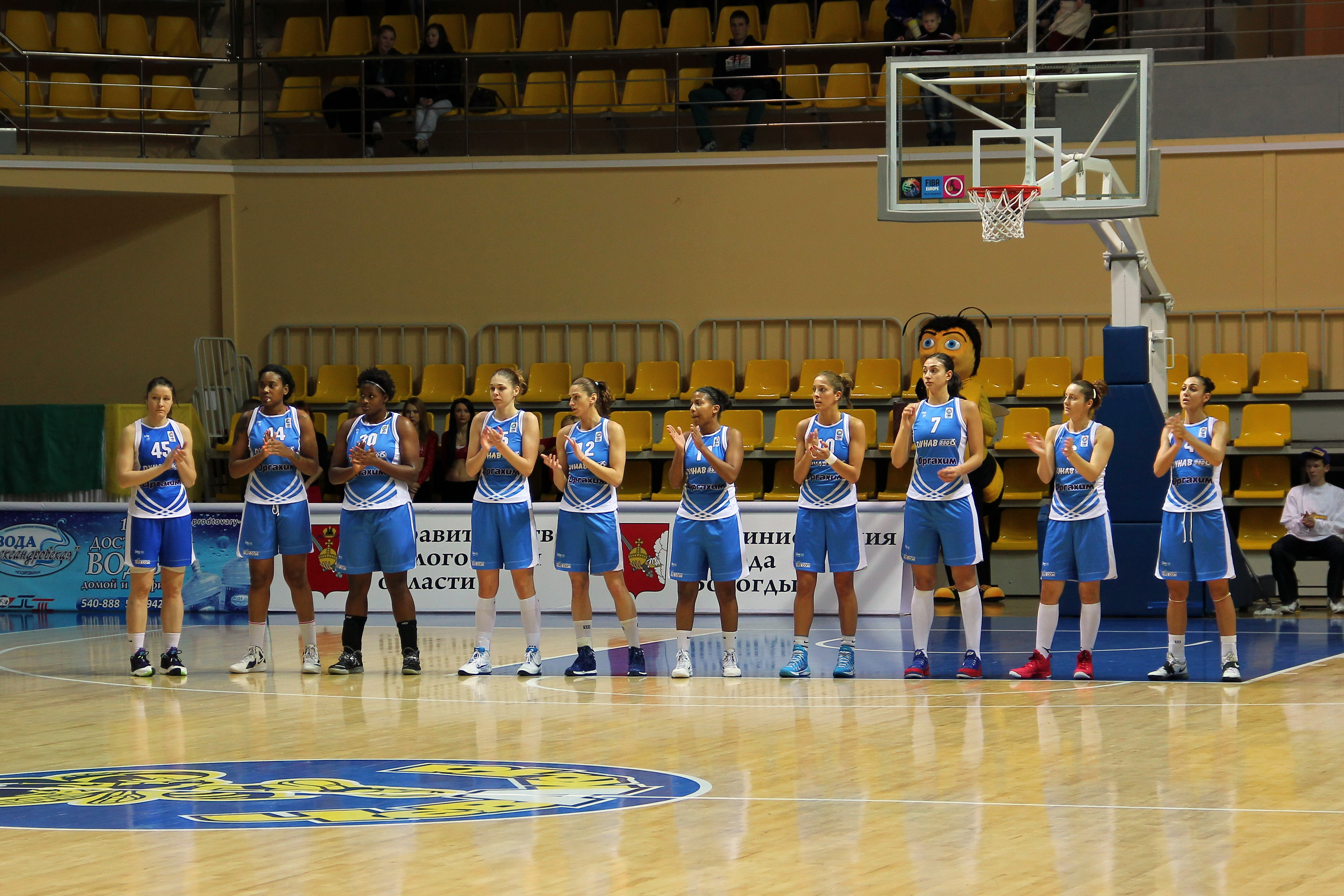
WBC Dunav Ruse

== Titles ==
- Bulgarian Championship (5)
  - 2008, 2012, 2013, 2014, 2015
- Bulgarian Cup (4)
  - 2010, 2011, 2012, 2013

== 2012-13 roster ==
- (1.89) (Bulgaria) Margarita Ilieva
- (1.87) (United States) Amanda Johnson
- (1.85) (United States) Kristina Santiago
- (1.84) (Bulgaria) Radina Kordova
- (1.83) (Bulgaria) Tsvetomira Tsarenkapova
- (1.80) (Estonia) Merike Anderson
- (1.80) (Bulgaria) Kalina Peneva
- (1.78) (Bulgaria) Marinela Agalareva
- (1.76) (Bulgaria) Teodora Angelova
- (1.76) (Bulgaria) Zornitsa Kostova
- (1.75) (Bulgaria) Violina Kocheva
- (1.69) (Bulgaria) Ines Rasimova
- (1.69) (Bulgaria) Iva Terzieva
