= Bulgarian Women's Basketball Cup =

Basketball competition in Bulgaria

The Bulgarian Women's Basketball Cup is an annual cup competition for Bulgarian women's basketball clubs founded in 1951, six years after the national championship. Levski Sofia is the most successful team in the competition with 13 titles between 1969 and 1991, followed by Slavia Sofia with ten, WBC Montana with seven, Neftokhimik Burgas with six and Akademik Sofia and Minyor Pernik with five.

== List of champions ==
- 1951 Lokomotiv Sofia
- 1952 Slavia Sofia
- 1953 Slavia Sofia
- 1954 Lokomotiv Sofia
- 1955 Slavia Sofia
- 1956 Slavia Sofia
- 1957 Akademik Sofia
- 1960 Akademik Sofia
- 1962 NSA Sofia
- 1963 NSA Sofia
- 1965 Lokomotiv Sofia
- 1966 Slavia Sofia
- 1967 Akademik Sofia
- 1968 Lokomotiv Sofia
- 1969 Levski Sofia
- 1970 Slavia Sofia
- 1971 Slavia Sofia
- 1972 Levski Sofia
- 1973 Akademik Sofia
- 1974 Levski Sofia
- 1975 Akademik Sofia
- 1976 Levski Sofia
- 1977 Levski Sofia
- 1978 Minyor Pernik
- 1979 Minyor Pernik
- 1980 Levski Sofia
- 1981 Minyor Pernik
- 1982 Levski Sofia
- 1983 Levski Sofia
- 1984 Slavia Sofia
- 1985 Levski Sofia
- 1986 Levski Sofia
- 1987 Levski Sofia
- 1988 Minyor Pernik
- 1989 Levski Sofia
- 1990 Minyor Pernik
- 1991 Levski Sofia
- 1992 Kremikovtsi
- 1993 Kremikovtsi
- 1994 Septemvri Sofia
- 1995 Montana
- 1996 Maritsa Plovdiv
- 1997 Montana
- 1998 Montana
- 1999 Neftokhimik Burgas
- 2000 Montana
- 2001 Slavia Sofia
- 2002 Akademik Plovdiv
- 2003 Slavia Sofia
- 2004 Neftokhimik Burgas
- 2005 Neftokhimik Burgas
- 2006 Neftokhimik Burgas
- 2007 CSKA Sofia
- 2008 Neftokhimik Burgas
- 2009 Montana
- 2010 Dunav Ruse
- 2011 Dunav Ruse
- 2012 Dunav Ruse
- 2013 Dunav Ruse
- 2014 Montana
- 2015 Neftokhimik Burgas
- 2016 Montana
- 2017 Haskovo 2012
- 2018 Montana
- 2019 Montana
- 2020 Beroe
- 2021 Beroe
- 2022 Beroe
- 2023 Beroe
- 2024 Rilski sportist
- 2025 Montana
