= Stade Clermontois BF =

- Leagues: RF2 (VI)
- Founded: 1938
- Arena: Honoré et Jean Fleury
- Location: Clermont-Ferrand, France
- Team colors: Blue and red
- President: -
- Head coach: Maryline Besson
- Championships: 1 French Cup
- Website: club.quomodo.com/scbf
Home

Stade Clermontois Basket Féminin, formerly known as Stade Clermontois Auvergne Basket 63 is a French women's basketball club from Clermont-Ferrand created in 1938, currently playing in 6th tier Regionale Féminine 2. It is the women's basketball section of Stace Clermontois, a sports club also featuring archery, athletics, boxing, canne de combat, fencing, gymnastics, handball, jeu provençal, judo, karate, pétanque, rugby union, savate, swimming, table tennis, tennis, weightlifting, volleyball and wrestling sections.

Stade Clermontois became Clermont's main women's basketball team after Clermont UC's disappearance in 1985. It won the national cup in 1989, and it played the 1994 Ronchetti Cup and the 2006 FIBA Eurocup. In 2009 it withdrew from professional basketball for financial reasons.

== Titles ==
- French Cup (1)
  - 1989

== 2012-13 squad ==
Gaëlle Autaa, Sonia Benzaabar, Margaux Besson, Emilie Bisseriex, Cyrielle Gental, Marion Grosini, Magalie Herail, Marine Perrot, Caroline Prat, Elodie Rongier, Laurène Valette.

== See also ==
- Stade Clermontois BA (male counterpart)
