= CB Isla Única =

- Leagues: LF 2
- Founded: 2012
- Dissolved: 2014
- Arena: Pabellón Municipal de Santa Cruz
- Location: Santa Cruz de Tenerife, Spain
- Team colors: Blue and white
- President: -
- Head coach: Esther Herrero
- Website: islaunic-cp56.webjoomla.es
Home	Away

Club Baloncesto Isla Única de Tenerife is a Spanish women's basketball club from Santa Cruz de Tenerife.

== History ==
The club was founded as CB Isla de Tenerife in 2012 as a merger between Uni Tenerife and CB Isla de Tenerife.

As CB Isla de Tenerife, better known as Symel Tenerife for sponsorship reasons, it played in the LFB until 2003, and it made several appearances in the Ronchetti Cup, reaching the quarter-finals in 1995.

After the relegation in 2014, the club was dissolved due to its financial trouble and the administrative problems to register the team.

== Season by season ==
Season	Tier	Division	Pos.
2012–13	2	Liga Femenina 2	11th
2013–14	2	Liga Femenina 2	11th
