= Bulgarian Women's Basketball Championship =

Basketball competition in Bulgaria

- Current season, competition or edition: 2024–25 Bulgarian Women's Basketball Championship
- Sport: Basketball
- Founded: 1942
- First season: 1942
- No. of teams: 8
- Country: Bulgaria
- Continent: FIBA Europe (Europe)
- Most recent champion: Montana (4st title)
- Most titles: Slavia Sofia (15 titles)
- Level on pyramid: 1
- Domestic cup: Bulgarian Women's Basketball Cup

The Bulgarian Women's Basketball Championship is the premier league for women's basketball clubs in Bulgaria. Slavia Sofia is the championship's most successful club with 15 titles between 1953 and 2004 followed by Akademik Sofia and Levski Sofia with eight titles, Lokomotiv Sofia with seven and Minyor Pernik with six, while Neftokhimik Burgas has been the most successful team in recent years with 5 titles since 2005.

The championship's leading teams were fairly successful in FIBA Europe competitions during the communist era, with Slavia Sofia and Levski Sofia winning three European Cups and two Ronchetti Cups between 1959 and 1984. Maritsa Plovdiv and Minyor Pernik also played in European finals.

== 2018-19 teams ==
- Beroe Stara Zagora
- Montana
- Slavia Sofia
- NSA
- WBC Septemvri 97
- Akademic Plovdiv
- Lokomotiv St. Zagora
- WBC Champion 2006 Sofia

== List of champions ==
- 1945 Rakovski Sofia
- 1946 Rakovski Sofia
- 1947 Rakovski Sofia
- 1948 Lokomotiv Sofia
- 1949 Lokomotiv Sofia
- 1950 Lokomotiv Sofia
- 1951 Lokomotiv Sofia
- 1952 Lokomotiv Sofia
- 1953 Slavia Sofia
- 1954 Slavia Sofia
- 1955 Slavia Sofia
- 1956 Slavia Sofia
- 1957 Slavia Sofia
- 1958 Slavia Sofia
- 1959 Slavia Sofia
- 1960 Akademik Sofia
- 1961 Slavia Sofia
- 1962 Slavia Sofia
- 1963 Slavia Sofia
- 1964 Slavia Sofia
- 1965 Slavia Sofia
- 1966 Akademik Sofia
- 1967 Lokomotiv Sofia
- 1968 Akademik Sofia
- 1969 Akademik Sofia
- 1970 Akademik Sofia
- 1971 Maritsa Plovdiv
- 1972 Minyor Pernik
- 1973 Maritsa Plovdiv
- 1974 Maritsa Plovdiv
- 1975 Akademik Sofia
- 1976 Akademik Sofia
- 1977 Minyor Pernik
- 1978 Minyor Pernik
- 1979 Minyor Pernik
- 1980 Levski Sofia
- 1981 Minyor Pernik
- 1982 Akademik Sofia
- 1983 Levski Sofia
- 1984 Levski Sofia
- 1985 Levski Sofia
- 1986 Levski Sofia
- 1987 Levski Sofia
- 1988 Levski Sofia
- 1989 Kremikovtsi
- 1990 Beroe Stara Zagora
- 1991 Lokomotiv Sofia
- 1992 Beroe Stara Zagora
- 1993 Kremikovtsi
- 1994 Levski Sofia
- 1995 Montana
- 1996 Minyor Pernik
- 1997 Kremikovtsi
- 1998 Kremikovtsi
- 1999 Kremikovtsi
- 2000 Montana
- 2001 Akademic Plovdiv
- 2002 Slavia Sofia
- 2003 Slavia Sofia
- 2004 Slavia Sofia
- 2005 Neftokhimik Burgas
- 2006 Neftokhimik Burgas
- 2007 CSKA Sofia
- 2008 Dunav Ruse
- 2009 Neftokhimik Burgas
- 2010 Neftokhimik Burgas
- 2011 Neftokhimik Burgas
- 2012 Dunav Ruse
- 2013 Dunav Ruse
- 2014 Dunav Ruse
- 2015 Dunav Ruse
- 2016 Montana 2003
- 2017 Haskovo 2012
- 2018 Montana 2003
- 2019 Montana 2003
- 2021 Beroe Stara Zagora
- 2022 Beroe Stara Zagora
- 2023 Beroe Stara Zagora
- 2024 Beroe Stara Zagora
- 2025 Montana 2003
