= Basketball at the 2024 Summer Olympics – Women's team rosters =

This article shows the rosters of all participating teams at the 5x5 women's basketball tournament at the 2024 Summer Olympics in Paris, France.

== Group A ==
=== China ===
A 16-player roster was announced on 26 June 2024. The final squad was revealed on 13 July 2024.

China women's national basketball team – 2024 Summer Olympics roster
Players
Coaches

Pos.	No.	Name	Age – Date of birth	Height	Club	Ctr.
G	4	Li Yuan	24 – 29 May 2000	1.70 m (5 ft 7 in)	Shandong Six Stars	(China)
G	5	Wang Siyu	28 – 16 October 1995	1.80 m (5 ft 11 in)	Shandong Six Stars	(China)
G	6	Wu Tongtong	30 – 27 June 1994	1.75 m (5 ft 9 in)	Shanxi Flame	(China)
PG	7	Yang Liwei (C)	29 – 2 January 1995	1.76 m (5 ft 9 in)	Guangdong Vermilion Birds	(China)
F	8	Yang Shuyu	22 – 6 March 2002	1.80 m (5 ft 11 in)	Guangdong Vermilion Birds	(China)
SG	9	Li Meng	29 – 2 January 1995	1.83 m (6 ft 0 in)	Liaoning Flying Eagles	(China)
F	10	Zhang Ru	24 – 2 September 1999	1.85 m (6 ft 1 in)	Henan Phoenix	(China)
PF	11	Huang Sijing	28 – 8 January 1996	1.90 m (6 ft 3 in)	Guangdong Vermilion Birds	(China)
F	12	Luo Xinyu	22 – 22 November 2001	1.88 m (6 ft 2 in)	Jiangsu Phoenix	(China)
C	13	Sun Mengran	32 – 16 July 1992	1.97 m (6 ft 6 in)	Shandong Six Stars	(China)
C	14	Li Yueru	25 – 28 March 1999	2.00 m (6 ft 7 in)	Beşiktaş	(Turkey)
C	15	Han Xu	24 – 31 October 1999	2.05 m (6 ft 9 in)	Xinjiang Magic Deer	(China)

Head coach

- (China) Zheng Wei

Assistant coach(es)

- (Spain) César Rupérez

Legend

- (C) Team captain
- Club – describes last
  club before the tournament
- Age – describes age
  on 28 July 2024

=== Puerto Rico ===
A 15-player roster was announced on 8 July 2024. The final 12-player roster was announced on 20 July.

Puerto Rico women's national basketball team – 2024 Summer Olympics roster
Players
Coaches

Pos.	No.	Name	Age – Date of birth	Height	Club	Ctr.
F	1	Tayra Meléndez	30 – 29 October 1993	1.70 m (5 ft 7 in)	Gigantes de Carolina	(Puerto Rico)
F	2	Brianna Jones	27 – 9 February 1997	1.78 m (5 ft 10 in)	Tianjin Guanlan	(China)
PG	5	Pamela Rosado (C)	38 – 30 April 1986	1.65 m (5 ft 5 in)	Montañeras de Morovis	(Puerto Rico)
C	7	Mariah Pérez	23 – 9 August 2000	1.91 m (6 ft 3 in)	Dayton Flyers	(United States)
SG	9	Allison Gibson	31 – 27 March 1993	1.91 m (6 ft 3 in)	Gigantes de Carolina	(Puerto Rico)
PF	11	Sofía Roma	27 – 21 November 1996	1.88 m (6 ft 2 in)	Montañeras de Morovis	(Puerto Rico)
PF	21	Mya Hollingshed	24 – 29 October 1999	1.93 m (6 ft 4 in)	Dinamo Sassari	(Italy)
SG	22	Arella Guirantes	26 – 15 October 1997	1.80 m (5 ft 11 in)	PF Schio	(Italy)
PG	23	Trinity San Antonio	20 – 28 October 2003	1.74 m (5 ft 9 in)	Grand Canyon Antelopes	(United States)
PF	25	Isalys Quiñones	26 – 23 October 1997	1.91 m (6 ft 3 in)	Osos de Manatí	(Puerto Rico)
C	33	India Pagán	25 – 7 January 1999	1.87 m (6 ft 2 in)	SBŠ Ostrava	(Czech Republic)
G	55	Jacqueline Benítez	27 – 6 June 1997	1.78 m (5 ft 10 in)	Explosivas de Moca	(Puerto Rico)

Head coach

- (Puerto Rico) Jerry Batista

Assistant coach(es)

- (Puerto Rico) Samuel Arill

Legend

- (C) Team captain
- Club – describes last
  club before the tournament
- Age – describes age
  on 28 July 2024

=== Serbia ===
The roster was announced on 24 July 2024.

Serbia women's national basketball team – 2024 Summer Olympics roster
Players
Coaches

Pos.	No.	Name	Age – Date of birth	Height	Club	Ctr.
PF	1	Ivana Raca	24 – 10 September 1999	1.88 m (6 ft 2 in)	Dinamo Sassari	(Italy)
SG	6	Saša Čađo	35 – 13 July 1989	1.78 m (5 ft 10 in)	CCC Polkowice	(Poland)
SG	8	Nevena Jovanović	34 – 30 June 1990	1.79 m (5 ft 10 in)	Nika Syktyvkar	(Russia)
PG	12	Yvonne Anderson	34 – 8 March 1990	1.75 m (5 ft 9 in)	Fenerbahçe	(Turkey)
C	14	Dragana Stanković	29 – 18 January 1995	1.95 m (6 ft 5 in)	Reyer Venezia	(Italy)
SF	17	Jovana Nogić	26 – 17 December 1997	1.81 m (5 ft 11 in)	Beşiktaş	(Turkey)
SF	25	Maša Janković	24 – 1 February 2000	1.87 m (6 ft 2 in)	CB Avenida	(Spain)
PG	30	Aleksandra Katanić	27 – 18 May 1997	1.72 m (5 ft 8 in)	Ormanspor	(Turkey)
PF	32	Angela Dugalić	22 – 29 December 2001	1.93 m (6 ft 4 in)	UCLA Bruins	(United States)
C	33	Tina Krajišnik (C)	33 – 12 January 1991	1.90 m (6 ft 3 in)	UMMC Ekaterinburg	(Russia)
PF	51	Mina Đorđević	25 – 23 February 1999	1.86 m (6 ft 1 in)	Emlak Konut SK	(Turkey)
G	66	Nadija Smailbegović	23 – 5 April 2001	1.77 m (5 ft 10 in)	PEAC-Pécs	(Hungary)

Head coach

- (Serbia) Marina Maljković

Assistant coach(es)

- (North Macedonia) Jelena Antić
- (Serbia) Filip Benčić
- (Serbia) Dajana Butulija
- (Serbia) Ljubica Drljača
- (Serbia) Danielle Page

Legend

- (C) Team captain
- Club – describes last
  club before the tournament
- Age – describes age
  on 28 July 2024

Roster

=== Spain ===
A 15-player roster was announced on 7 June 2024. The final roster was revealed on 9 July 2024.

Spain women's national basketball team – 2024 Summer Olympics roster
Players
Coaches

Pos.	No.	Name	Age – Date of birth	Height	Club	Ctr.
PG	4	Mariona Ortiz	32 – 28 February 1992	1.82 m (6 ft 0 in)	Basket Zaragoza	(Spain)
PF	6	Laura Gil	32 – 24 April 1992	1.90 m (6 ft 3 in)	CB Avenida	(Spain)
SF	7	Alba Torrens	34 – 30 August 1989	1.92 m (6 ft 4 in)	Valencia Basket	(Spain)
PF	8	María Araújo	26 – 1 August 1997	1.82 m (6 ft 0 in)	Çukurova Basketbol	(Turkey)
SF	9	Queralt Casas	31 – 18 November 1992	1.80 m (5 ft 11 in)	Valencia Basket	(Spain)
PG	10	Leticia Romero	29 – 28 May 1995	1.72 m (5 ft 8 in)	Valencia Basket	(Spain)
SG	11	Leonor Rodríguez	32 – 21 October 1991	1.80 m (5 ft 11 in)	CB Avenida	(Spain)
PG	12	Maite Cazorla	27 – 18 June 1997	1.78 m (5 ft 10 in)	USK Praha	(Czech Republic)
F	13	Andrea Vilaró	31 – 9 May 1993	1.79 m (5 ft 10 in)	CB Avenida	(Spain)
C	17	Megan Gustafson	27 – 13 December 1996	1.90 m (6 ft 3 in)	Las Vegas Aces	(United States)
C	20	Paula Ginzo	26 – 16 February 1998	1.89 m (6 ft 2 in)	CB Jairis	(Spain)
SF	22	María Conde	27 – 14 January 1997	1.86 m (6 ft 1 in)	USK Praha	(Czech Republic)

Head coach

- (Spain) Miguel Méndez

Assistant coach(es)

- (Spain) Luis Rey

Legend

- (C) Team captain
- (C) Team captain
- Club – describes last
  club before the tournament
- Age – describes age
  on 28 July 2024

== Group B ==
=== Australia ===
A 26-player roster was announced on 26 March 2024. The final squad was revealed on 7 July 2024.

Australia women's national basketball team – 2024 Summer Olympics roster
Players
Coaches

Pos.	No.	Name	Age – Date of birth	Height	Club	Ctr.
G	2	Jade Melbourne	21 – 18 August 2002	1.78 m (5 ft 10 in)	Washington Mystics	(United States)
PG	3	Kristy Wallace	28 – 3 January 1996	1.80 m (5 ft 11 in)	Indiana Fever	(United States)
SF	6	Stephanie Talbot	30 – 15 June 1994	1.88 m (6 ft 2 in)	Los Angeles Sparks	(United States)
G	7	Tess Madgen (C)	33 – 12 August 1990	1.80 m (5 ft 11 in)	Sydney Flames	(Australia)
F	11	Alanna Smith	27 – 10 September 1996	1.90 m (6 ft 3 in)	Minnesota Lynx	(United States)
F	13	Ezi Magbegor	24 – 13 August 1999	1.93 m (6 ft 4 in)	Seattle Storm	(United States)
C	14	Marianna Tolo	35 – 2 July 1989	1.96 m (6 ft 5 in)	Uni Girona CB	(Spain)
F	15	Cayla George	35 – 1 May 1989	1.93 m (6 ft 4 in)	Sydney Flames	(Australia)
SF	17	Amy Atwell	26 – 30 June 1998	1.83 m (6 ft 0 in)	Bendigo Braves	(Australia)
G	20	Isobel Borlase	19 – 12 September 2004	1.80 m (5 ft 11 in)	Forestville Eagles	(Australia)
C	25	Lauren Jackson	43 – 11 May 1981	1.95 m (6 ft 5 in)	Southside Flyers	(Australia)
G	32	Sami Whitcomb	36 – 20 July 1988	1.78 m (5 ft 10 in)	Seattle Storm	(United States)

Head coach

- (Australia) Sandy Brondello

Assistant coach(es)

- (Australia) Cheryl Chambers
- (Australia) Paul Goriss
- (Australia) Shannon Seebohm

Legend

- (C) Team captain
- Club – describes last
  club before the tournament
- Age – describes age
  on 28 July 2024

=== Canada ===
Canada's roster of 12 athletes was named on July 2, 2024.

Canada women's national basketball team – 2024 Summer Olympics roster
Players
Coaches

Pos.	No.	Name	Age – Date of birth	Height	Club	Ctr.
G	2	Shay Colley	28 – 6 January 1996	1.76 m (5 ft 9 in)	Tango Bourges Basket	(France)
G	4	Sami Hill	29 – 22 November 1994	1.78 m (5 ft 10 in)	Araski	(Spain)
G	5	Kia Nurse	28 – 22 February 1996	1.82 m (6 ft 0 in)	Los Angeles Sparks	(United States)
SF	6	Bridget Carleton	27 – 22 May 1997	1.85 m (6 ft 1 in)	Minnesota Lynx	(United States)
G	8	Cassandre Prosper	19 – 25 June 2005	1.88 m (6 ft 2 in)	Notre Dame Fighting Irish	(United States)
PF	9	Yvonne Ejim	22 – 9 April 2002	1.82 m (6 ft 0 in)	Gonzaga Bulldogs	(United States)
C	11	Natalie Achonwa (C)	31 – 22 November 1992	1.91 m (6 ft 3 in)	Free agent
G	12	Syla Swords	18 – 28 January 2006	1.82 m (6 ft 0 in)	Michigan Wolverines	(United States)
C	14	Kayla Alexander	33 – 5 January 1991	1.93 m (6 ft 4 in)	Valencia Basket	(Spain)
F	15	Laeticia Amihere	23 – 10 July 2001	1.86 m (6 ft 1 in)	Atlanta Dream	(United States)
G	21	Nirra Fields	30 – 3 December 1993	1.76 m (5 ft 9 in)	Emlak Konut SK	(Turkey)
F	24	Aaliyah Edwards	22 – 9 July 2002	1.91 m (6 ft 3 in)	Washington Mystics	(United States)

Head coach

- (Spain) Víctor Lapeña

Assistant coach(es)

- (Canada) Steve Baur
- (Canada) Carly Clarke
- (United States) Murriel Page
- (United States) Noelle Quinn

Legend

- (C) Team captain
- Club – describes last
  club before the tournament
- Age – describes age
  on 28 July 2024

=== France ===
An 18-player roster was announced on 16 May 2024. The final roster was announced on 8 June 2024.

France women's national basketball team – 2024 Summer Olympics roster roster
Players
Coaches

Pos.	No.	Name	Age – Date of birth	Height	Club	Ctr.
PG	4	Marine Fauthoux	23 – 23 January 2001	1.76 m (5 ft 9 in)	Çukurova Basketbol	(Turkey)
PF	6	Alexia Chery	25 – 5 September 1998	1.90 m (6 ft 3 in)	ASVEL Féminin	(France)
SG	10	Sarah Michel (C)	35 – 10 January 1989	1.80 m (5 ft 11 in)	Bourges Basket	(France)
SF	11	Valériane Ayayi	30 – 29 April 1994	1.84 m (6 ft 0 in)	USK Praha	(Czech Republic)
C	12	Iliana Rupert	23 – 12 July 2001	1.94 m (6 ft 4 in)	Çukurova Basketbol	(Turkey)
F	13	Janelle Salaün	22 – 5 September 2001	1.88 m (6 ft 2 in)	PF Schio	(Italy)
C	14	Dominique Malonga	18 – 16 November 2005	1.98 m (6 ft 6 in)	ASVEL Féminin	(France)
F	15	Gabby Williams	27 – 9 September 1996	1.80 m (5 ft 11 in)	Fenerbahçe	(Turkey)
C	22	Marième Badiane	29 – 24 November 1994	1.90 m (6 ft 3 in)	Fenerbahçe	(Turkey)
SG	23	Marine Johannès	29 – 21 January 1995	1.77 m (5 ft 10 in)	ASVEL Féminin	(France)
G	42	Leïla Lacan	20 – 2 June 2004	1.81 m (5 ft 11 in)	Basket Landes	(France)
PG	47	Romane Bernies	31 – 27 June 1993	1.70 m (5 ft 7 in)	BLMA	(France)

Head coach

- (France) Jean-Aimé Toupane

Assistant coach(es)

- (France) David Gautier
- (France) Grégory Halin
- (France) Catherine Melain

Legend

- (C) Team captain
- Club – describes last
  club before the tournament
- Age – describes age
  on 28 July 2024

=== Nigeria ===
A 16-player roster was announced on 7 July 2024. The final squad was revealed on 23 July 2024.

Nigeria women's national basketball team – 2024 Summer Olympics roster
Players
Coaches

Pos.	No.	Name	Age – Date of birth	Height	Club	Ctr.
F	0	Amy Okonkwo (C)	27 – 26 August 1996	1.88 m (6 ft 2 in)	Tango Bourges Basket	(France)
C	3	Pallas Kunaiyi-Akpannah	27 – 12 July 1997	1.88 m (6 ft 2 in)	Magnolia Basket Campobasso	(Italy)
G	4	Elizabeth Balogun	23 – 9 September 2000	1.85 m (6 ft 1 in)	CB Bembibre	(Spain)
SG	5	Olaoluwatomi Taiwo	24 – 16 June 2000	1.78 m (5 ft 10 in)	Esgueira Basket	(Portugal)
C	6	Lauren Ebo	24 – 7 June 2000	1.93 m (6 ft 4 in)	Turgutlu Belediyespor	(Turkey)
G	9	Ifunanya Okoro	25 – 6 July 1999	1.83 m (6 ft 0 in)	Tindastóll	(Iceland)
PG	10	Promise Amukamara	31 – 22 June 1993	1.75 m (5 ft 9 in)	Dynamo Kursk	(Russia)
F	20	Murjanatu Musa	24 – 5 May 2000	1.87 m (6 ft 2 in)	Celta de Vigo	(Spain)
C	22	Blessing Ejiofor	25 – 2 September 1998	1.95 m (6 ft 5 in)	Celta de Vigo	(Spain)
PG	23	Ezinne Kalu	32 – 26 June 1992	1.73 m (5 ft 8 in)	Basket Roma	(Italy)
SF	25	Adebola Adeyeye	24 – 10 November 1999	1.88 m (6 ft 2 in)	Kentucky Wildcats	(United States)
F	33	Nicole Enabosi	27 – 26 March 1997	1.83 m (6 ft 0 in)	C' Chartres Basket Féminin	(France)

Head coach

- (Nigeria) Rena Wakama

Assistant coach(es)

- (France) Wani Muganguzi

Legend

- (C) Team captain
- Club – describes last
  club before the tournament
- Age – describes age
  on 28 July 2024

== Group C ==
=== Belgium ===
A 14-player roster was announced on 24 May 2024. The final roster was revealed on 6 July 2024.

Belgium women's national basketball team – 2024 Summer Olympics roster
Players
Coaches

Pos.	No.	Name	Age – Date of birth	Height	Club	Ctr.
PG	4	Elise Ramette	25 – 3 November 1998	1.77 m (5 ft 10 in)	AE Sedis Bàsquet	(Spain)
SF	6	Antonia Delaere	29 – 1 August 1994	1.82 m (6 ft 0 in)	CB Avenida	(Spain)
SF	10	Laure Résimont	26 – 29 January 1998	1.85 m (6 ft 1 in)	Kangoeroes Basket Mechelen	(Belgium)
PF	11	Emma Meesseman (C)	31 – 13 May 1993	1.93 m (6 ft 4 in)	Fenerbahçe	(Turkey)
C	13	Kyara Linskens	27 – 13 November 1996	1.93 m (6 ft 4 in)	Lattes Montpellier	(France)
PF	15	Nastja Claessens	19 – 2 December 2004	1.84 m (6 ft 0 in)	KBT ION Waregem	(Belgium)
SF	22	Bethy Mununga	27 – 22 July 1997	1.83 m (6 ft 0 in)	ESB Villeneuve-d'Ascq	(France)
C	25	Becky Massey	24 – 21 March 2000	1.86 m (6 ft 1 in)	IDK Euskotren	(Spain)
SF	31	Maxuelle Lisowa-Mbaka	23 – 14 May 2001	1.78 m (5 ft 10 in)	ESB Villeneuve-d'Ascq	(France)
C	34	Billie Massey	24 – 21 March 2000	1.86 m (6 ft 1 in)	CB Estudiantes	(Spain)
PG	35	Julie Vanloo	31 – 10 February 1993	1.68 m (5 ft 6 in)	Washington Mystics	(United States)
F	99	Ine Joris	23 – 25 July 2001	1.83 m (6 ft 0 in)	BC Castors Braine	(Belgium)

Head coach

- (France) Rachid Meziane

Legend

- (C) Team captain
- Club – describes last
  club before the tournament
- Age – describes age
  on 28 July 2024

=== Germany ===
A 18-player roster was announced on 19 June 2024. It was reduced to 15 players on 12 July 2024. The final squad was revealed on 15 July 2024.

Germany women's national basketball team – 2024 Summer Olympics roster
Players
Coaches

Pos.	No.	Name	Age – Date of birth	Height	Club	Ctr.
F	0	Satou Sabally	26 – 25 April 1998	1.90 m (6 ft 3 in)	Dallas Wings	(United States)
PG	1	Alexis Peterson	29 – 20 June 1995	1.65 m (5 ft 5 in)	CCC Polkowice	(Poland)
G	3	Alexandra Wilke	27 – 29 September 1996	1.75 m (5 ft 9 in)	Rutronik Stars Keltern	(Germany)
PF	8	Nyara Sabally	24 – 26 February 2000	1.87 m (6 ft 2 in)	New York Liberty	(United States)
PF	11	Marie Gülich (C)	30 – 28 May 1994	1.95 m (6 ft 5 in)	Valencia Basket	(Spain)
SG	13	Leonie Fiebich	24 – 10 January 2000	1.92 m (6 ft 4 in)	New York Liberty	(United States)
C	15	Luisa Geiselsöder	24 – 10 February 2000	1.90 m (6 ft 3 in)	Basket Landes	(France)
SF	16	Alina Hartmann	28 – 23 October 1995	1.85 m (6 ft 1 in)	BC Namur-Capitale	(Belgium)
PF	20	Frieda Bühner	20 – 28 May 2004	1.86 m (6 ft 1 in)	CB Estudiantes	(Spain)
SF	22	Emily Bessoir	22 – 19 November 2001	1.92 m (6 ft 4 in)	UCLA Bruins	(United States)
PG	24	Lina Sontag	20 – 24 November 2003	1.91 m (6 ft 3 in)	UCLA Bruins	(United States)
SF	46	Romy Bär	37 – 17 May 1987	1.87 m (6 ft 2 in)	GISA LIONS MBC	(Germany)

Head coach

- (Canada) Lisa Thomaidis

Assistant coach(es)

- (Canada) Claire Meadows
- (United States) Sidney Parsons
- (United States) Anne Marie Thuss

Legend

- (C) Team captain
- Club – describes last
  club before the tournament
- Age – describes age
  on 28 July 2024

=== Japan ===
An 18-player roster was announced on 24 May 2024. The final roster was revealed on 25 June 2024.

Japan women's national basketball team – 2024 Summer Olympics roster
Players
Coaches

Pos.	No.	Name	Age – Date of birth	Height	Club	Ctr.
PF	3	Stephanie Mawuli	25 – 25 November 1998	1.82 m (6 ft 0 in)	Basket Zaragoza	(Spain)
C	8	Maki Takada	34 – 23 August 1989	1.85 m (6 ft 1 in)	Denso Iris	(Japan)
PG	12	Asami Yoshida	36 – 9 October 1987	1.65 m (5 ft 5 in)	Aisin Wings	(Japan)
PG	13	Rui Machida	31 – 8 March 1993	1.62 m (5 ft 4 in)	Fujitsu Red Wave	(Japan)
SG	15	Nako Motohashi	30 – 10 October 1993	1.64 m (5 ft 5 in)	Tokyo Haneda Vickies	(Japan)
SG	23	Mai Yamamoto	24 – 23 October 1999	1.63 m (5 ft 4 in)	Toyota Antelopes	(Japan)
SF	27	Saki Hayashi (C)	29 – 16 March 1995	1.73 m (5 ft 8 in)	Fujitsu Red Wave	(Japan)
PF	30	Evelyn Mawuli	29 – 2 June 1995	1.80 m (5 ft 11 in)	Denso Iris	(Japan)
PG	32	Saori Miyazaki	28 – 27 August 1995	1.67 m (5 ft 6 in)	Eneos Sunflowers	(Japan)
PF	52	Yuki Miyazawa	31 – 2 June 1993	1.83 m (6 ft 0 in)	Fujitsu Red Wave	(Japan)
SF	75	Nanako Todo	23 – 29 November 2000	1.75 m (5 ft 9 in)	Toyota Boshoku Sunshine Rabbits	(Japan)
PF	88	Himawari Akaho	25 – 28 August 1998	1.84 m (6 ft 0 in)	Denso Iris	(Japan)

Head coach

- (Japan) Toru Onzuka

Assistant coach(es)

- (Japan) Kakeru Konno
- (Japan) Yoshikazu Suzuki

Legend

- (C) Team captain
- Club – describes last
  club before the tournament
- Age – describes age
  on 28 July 2024

=== United States ===
The roster was announced on 17 June 2024.

United States women's national basketball team – 2024 Summer Olympics roster
Players
Coaches

Pos.	No.	Name	Age – Date of birth	Height	Club	Ctr.
G	4	Jewell Loyd	30 – 5 October 1993	1.78 m (5 ft 10 in)	Seattle Storm	(United States)
G	5	Kelsey Plum	29 – 24 August 1994	1.73 m (5 ft 8 in)	Las Vegas Aces	(United States)
G	6	Sabrina Ionescu	26 – 6 December 1997	1.80 m (5 ft 11 in)	New York Liberty	(United States)
SF	7	Kahleah Copper	29 – 28 August 1994	1.85 m (6 ft 1 in)	Phoenix Mercury	(United States)
G	8	Chelsea Gray	31 – 8 October 1992	1.80 m (5 ft 11 in)	Las Vegas Aces	(United States)
C	9	A'ja Wilson	27 – 8 August 1996	1.91 m (6 ft 3 in)	Las Vegas Aces	(United States)
PF	10	Breanna Stewart	29 – 27 August 1994	1.91 m (6 ft 3 in)	New York Liberty	(United States)
SF	11	Napheesa Collier	27 – 23 September 1996	1.86 m (6 ft 1 in)	Minnesota Lynx	(United States)
G	12	Diana Taurasi	42 – 11 June 1982	1.82 m (6 ft 0 in)	Phoenix Mercury	(United States)
G	13	Jackie Young	26 – 16 September 1997	1.83 m (6 ft 0 in)	Las Vegas Aces	(United States)
PF	14	Alyssa Thomas	32 – 12 April 1992	1.88 m (6 ft 2 in)	Connecticut Sun	(United States)
C	15	Brittney Griner	33 – 18 October 1990	2.03 m (6 ft 8 in)	Phoenix Mercury	(United States)

Head coach

- (United States) Cheryl Reeve

Assistant coach(es)

- (United States) Kara Lawson
- (United States) Joni Taylor
- (United States) Mike Thibault

Legend

- (C) Team captain
- Club – describes last
  club before the tournament
- Age – describes age
  on 28 July 2024
