= 2024 FIBA Women's Olympic Qualifying Tournaments – Sopron =

Basketball tournament in Hungary

2024 FIBA World Olympic Qualifying Tournament for Women
Tournament details
- Host country: Hungary
- City: Sopron
- Dates: 8–11 February
- Teams: 4 (from 3 confederations)
- Venue: 1 (in 1 host city)

Final positions
- Champions: Japan
- Runners-up: Spain
- Third place: Canada
- Fourth place: Hungary

Tournament statistics
- Games played: 6
- Attendance: 11,150 (1,858 per game)
- MVP: (Japan) Mai Yamamoto
- Top scorer: (Japan) Mai Yamamoto (17.0 ppg)

Official website
- WOQT Hungary

The 2024 FIBA Women's Olympic Qualifying Tournament in Sopron was one of four 2024 FIBA Women's Olympic Qualifying Tournaments. The tournament was held at Sopron, Hungary, from 8 to 11 February 2024 and afforded the competitors the opportunity to earn a place in the 2024 Summer Olympics basketball tournament.

== Teams ==
Team	Qualification	Date of qualification	WR
Spain	Top six at EuroBasket Women 2023	22 June 2023	4
Canada	Top two at Americas Pre-Qualifying Tournament	10 November 2023	5
Japan	Top four at 2023 FIBA Women's Asia Cup	28 June 2023	9
Hungary	Top six at EuroBasket Women 2023	22 June 2023	19

== Venue ==
Sopron	2024 FIBA Women's Olympic Qualifying Tournaments – Sopron (Hungary)
Aréna Sopron	2024 FIBA Women's Olympic Qualifying Tournaments – Sopron (Hungary)
Capacity: 2,500	2024 FIBA Women's Olympic Qualifying Tournaments – Sopron (Hungary)

== Standings ==
Pos	Team	Pld	W	L	PF	PA	PD	Pts	Qualification
1	Japan	3	2	1	247	238	+9	5 (Note: Spain 75−86 Japan)	Summer Olympics
2	Spain	3	2	1	208	213	−5	5	Summer Olympics
3	Canada	3	1	2	204	201	+3	4 (Note: Hungary 55−67 Canada)	Summer Olympics
4	Hungary (H)	3	1	2	208	215	−7	4	

Source: FIBA
Rules for classification: 1) Points; 2) Head-to-head results; 3) Points difference; 4) Points scored.
(H) Hosts

== Results ==
All times are local (UTC+1).

8 February 2024
16:30

Boxscore

Spain	75–86	Japan
Scoring by quarter: 18–26, 18–20, 21–23, 18–17
Pts: Carrera 19; Rebs: Carrera 7 Asts: Cazorla 7		Pts: Hirashita, Mawuli 20; Rebs: Akaho 8 Asts: Miyazaki 8

Aréna Sopron, Sopron
Attendance: 850
Referees: Julio Anaya (PAN), Martin Horozov (BUL), Carsten Straube (GER)

8 February 2024
19:00

Boxscore

Hungary	55–67	Canada
Scoring by quarter: 11–25, 19–16, 9–14, 16–12
Pts: Juhász 13; Rebs: Juhász 8 Asts: Studer 5		Pts: Carleton 18; Rebs: Alexander 13; Asts: Colley 5

Aréna Sopron, Sopron
Attendance: 1,500
Referees: Wojciech Liszka (POL), Sara El-Sharnouby (EGY), Nicolas Fernandes (TAH)

9 February 2024
15:30

Boxscore

Canada	55–60	Spain
Scoring by quarter: 12–16, 13–20, 23–9, 7–15
Pts: Alexander 17; Rebs: Alexander 14; Asts: Colley 4		Pts: Gustafson 16; Rebs: Gil 9 Asts: Gil 3

Aréna Sopron, Sopron
Attendance: 1,100
Referees: Wojciech Liszka (POL), Martin Horozov (BUL), Nicolas Fernandes (TAH)

9 February 2024
18:00

Boxscore

Japan	75–81	Hungary
Scoring by quarter: 22–13, 10–19, 16–21, 27–28
Pts: Miyazaki, Yamamoto 15; Rebs: Yamamoto 6 Asts: Miyazaki, Yamamoto 6		Pts: Határ 17; Rebs: Határ 8 Asts: Lelik 6

Aréna Sopron, Sopron
Attendance: 2,900
Referees: Julio Anaya (PAN), Carsten Straube (GER), Wissam Zein (SYR)

11 February 2024
15:00

Boxscore

Canada	82–86	Japan
Scoring by quarter: 20–20, 26–30, 21–20, 15–16
Pts: Carleton 19; Rebs: Alexander 14; Asts: Colley 5		Pts: Mawuli, Yamamoto 21; Rebs: Akaho, Mawuli 5 Asts: Yoshida 5

Aréna Sopron, Sopron
Attendance: 1,800
Referees: Julio Anaya (PAN), Martin Horozov (BUL), Sara El-Sharnouby (EGY)

11 February 2024
17:30

Boxscore

Spain	73–72	Hungary
Scoring by quarter: 19–24, 8–22, 23–18, 23–8
Pts: Conde 16; Rebs: Gil 6 Asts: Casas 4		Pts: Studer 17; Rebs: Studer 10; Asts: Studer 7

Aréna Sopron, Sopron
Attendance: 3,000
Referees: Wojciech Liszka (POL), Carsten Straube (GER), Nicolas Fernandes (TAH)

== Statistics and awards ==
=== Statistical leaders ===
Players

Points

Name	PPG
(Japan) Mai Yamamoto	17.0
(Canada) Kayla Alexander	16.0
(Spain) Megan Gustafson	14.3
(Canada) Bridget Carleton	14.0
(Japan) Evelyn Mawuli	14.0

Rebounds

Name	RPG
(Canada) Kayla Alexander	13.7
(Canada) Natalie Achonwa	9.3
(Hungary) Dorka Juhász	8.0
(Canada) Nirra Fields	6.7
(Spain) Laura Gil	6.7

Assists

Name	APG
(Japan) Saori Miyazaki	6.0
(Canada) Shay Colley	4.7
(Hungary) Ágnes Studer	4.7
(Hungary) Debora Dubei	3.7
(Japan) Mai Yamamoto	3.7
(Spain) Maite Cazorla	3.7

Blocks

Name	BPG
(Japan) Himawari Akaho	1.8
(Canada) Laeticia Amihere	1.3
(Hungary) Bernadett Határ	0.7
(Spain) Laura Gil	0.7

Steals

Name	SPG
(Spain) Queralt Casas	4.7
(Spain) Laura Gil	2.3
(Canada) Bridget Carleton	3.0
(Canada) Syla Swords	1.7
(Hungary) Ágnes Studer	1.7

Efficiency

Name	EFFPG
(Canada) Kayla Alexander	26.3
(Japan) Mai Yamamoto	19.0
(Hungary) Dorka Juhász	15.7
(Canada) Natalie Achonwa	15.0
(Spain) Megan Gustafson	14.7

==== Teams ====
Points

Team	PPG
Japan	82.3
Hungary	69.3
Spain	69.3
Canada	68.0

Rebounds

Team	RPG
Canada	46.0
Hungary	36.7
Spain	32.0
Japan	27.0

Assists

Team	APG
Hungary	18.3
Spain	18.3
Japan	18.0
Canada	11.3

Blocks

Team	BPG
Canada	2.3
Japan	2.0
Spain	1.7
Hungary	1.0

Steals

Team	SPG
Spain	12.3
Hungary	8.7
Canada	7.7
Japan	6.0

Efficiency

Team	EFFPG
Japan	90.7
Spain	79.3
Canada	76.3
Hungary	74.7

=== Awards ===
The all star-team and MVP were announced on 11 February 2024.

All-Star Team
Guards	Forwards	Centers
(Japan) Mai Yamamoto (Japan) Saori Miyazaki	(Hungary) Dorka Juhász (Spain) Raquel Carrera	(Canada) Kayla Alexander
MVP: (Japan) Mai Yamamoto
