= 2024 FIBA Women's Americas Pre-Qualifying Olympic Qualifying Tournament =

2023 FIBA Women's Olympic Pre-Qualifying Tournament
Tournament details
- Host country: Colombia
- City: Medellín
- Dates: 9–12 November 2023
- Teams: 4 (from 1 confederation)
- Venue: 1 (in 1 host city)

Final positions
- Champions: Canada

Tournament statistics
- Top scorer: (Puerto Rico) Arella Guirantes (25.0 points per game)

Official website
- WOPQT Colombia

The 2024 FIBA Women's Americas Pre-Qualifying Olympic Qualifying Tournament was held from 9 to 12 November 2023 in Medellín, Colombia at the Coliseo Iván de Bedout. The top two teams, Canada and Puerto Rico, qualified for the 2024 FIBA Women's Olympic Qualifying Tournaments.

== Teams ==
Teams placed third to sixth in the 2023 FIBA Women's AmeriCup participated.

== Standings ==
| Pos | Team | Pld | W | L | PF | PA | PD | Pts | Qualification |
|---|---|---|---|---|---|---|---|---|---|
| 1 | Canada | 3 | 3 | 0 | 228 | 160 | +68 | 6 | 2024 FIBA Women's Olympic Qualifying Tournaments |
| 2 | Puerto Rico | 3 | 2 | 1 | 213 | 213 | 0 | 5 | 2024 FIBA Women's Olympic Qualifying Tournaments |
| 3 | Colombia (H) | 3 | 1 | 2 | 209 | 222 | −13 | 4 | |
| 4 | Venezuela | 3 | 0 | 3 | 168 | 223 | −55 | 3 | |

Source: FIBA
Rules for classification: 1) points; 2) head-to-head points; 3) head-to-head points difference; 4) head-to-head number of points scored.
(H) Hosts

== Games ==
All times are local (UTC−5).

9 November 2023
17:30

Boxscore

| Canada | 81–39 | Venezuela |
Scoring by quarter: 23–8, 19–7, 22–10, 17–14
| Pts: Amihere 11; Rebs: Amihere 11; Asts: Hill 4 | | Pts: Durán 10; Rebs: Fajardo 6 Asts: three players 2 |

Coliseo Iván de Bedout, Medellín
Referees: Leonardo Zalazar (ARG), Krishna Domínguez (MEX), Aline García (URU)

9 November 2023
20:00

Boxscore

| Puerto Rico | 80–79 | Colombia |
Scoring by quarter: 19–22, 28–23, 14–12, 19–22
| Pts: Guirantes 39; Rebs: Guirantes, Hollingshed 8 Asts: Guirantes 6 | | Pts: Paz 24; Rebs: Paz 14; Asts: Ríos 8 |

Coliseo Iván de Bedout, Medellín
Referees: Julio Anaya (PAN), Andrés Bartel (URU), Micaela Prado (ARG)

10 November 2023
17:30

Boxscore

| Venezuela | 57–65 | Puerto Rico |
Scoring by quarter: 15–13, 19–18, 10–23, 13–11
| Pts: Fajardo 17; Rebs: Wallen 9 Asts: three players 3 | | Pts: Hollingshed 16; Rebs: Hollingshed 11; Asts: Quiñones 3 |

Coliseo Iván de Bedout, Medellín
Referees: Krishna Domínguez (MEX), Alan dos Santos (BRA), Kristian Páez (ECU)

10 November 2023
20:00

Boxscore

| Colombia | 53–70 | Canada |
Scoring by quarter: 13–17, 18–17, 8–18, 14–18
| Pts: Ríos 16; Rebs: Paz 12; Asts: Ríos 7 | | Pts: Carleton 21; Rebs: Alexander 14; Asts: Achonwa 4 |

Coliseo Iván de Bedout, Medellín
Referees: Andrés Bartel (URU), Julio Anaya (PAN), Aline García (URU)

12 November 2023
16:00

Boxscore

| Canada | 77–68 | Puerto Rico |
Scoring by quarter: 18–12, 25–13, 22–27, 12–16
| Pts: Achonwa 16; Rebs: Amihere 15; Asts: four players 4 | | Pts: Guirantes 22; Rebs: Guirantes 6 Asts: Meléndez 3 |

Coliseo Iván de Bedout, Medellín
Referees: Leonardo Zalazar (ARG), Alan dos Santos (BRA), Aline García (URU)

12 November 2023
18:30

Boxscore

| Colombia | 77–72 | Venezuela |
Scoring by quarter: 22–15, 22–9, 22–23, 11–25
| Pts: Muñoz 19; Rebs: Vente 12; Asts: López 9 | | Pts: Wallen 32; Rebs: Fajardo 12; Asts: Durán 7 |

Coliseo Iván de Bedout, Medellín
Referees: Kristian Páez (ECU), Krishna Domínguez (MEX), Micaela Prado (ARG)
