= Yvonne Ejim =

Canadian basketball player (born 2002)

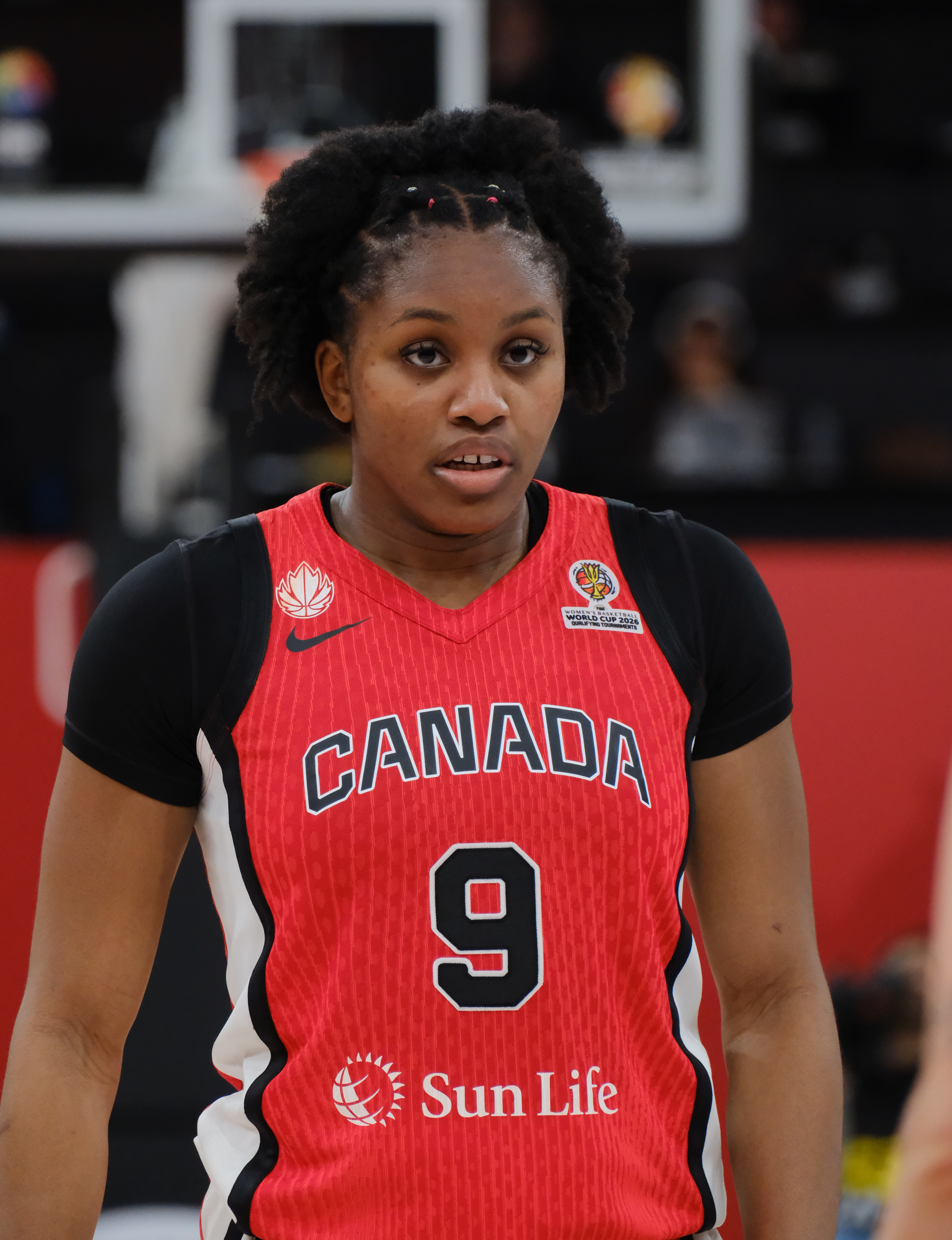
- Ejim with Canada in 2026

Azulmarino Mallorca Palma
- Position: Forward
- League: LfB

Personal information
- Born: April 9, 2002 (age 24) Calgary, Alberta, Canada
- Listed height: 6 ft 0 in (1.83 m)
- Listed weight: 182 lb (83 kg)

Career information
- High school: Edge School (Rocky View County, Alberta)
- College: Gonzaga (2020–2025)
- WNBA draft: 2025: 3rd round, 33rd overall pick
- Drafted by: Indiana Fever

Career highlights
- Becky Hammon Mid-Major Player of the Year (2024); 2x WCC Player of the Year (2024, 2025); 2x WCC Defensive Player of the Year (2024, 2025); WCC Sixth Woman of the Year (2022); 2× First-team All-WCC (2023, 2024); Second-team All-WCC (2022); Miss Basketball Alberta (2019)
- Stats at Basketball Reference
Medals
Women's basketball
Representing the Canada
FIBA Women's AmeriCup
Bronze medal – third place	2023 Mexico
Bronze medal – third place	2025 Chile
FIBA Americas Under-16 Championship
Silver medal – second place	2017 Argentina	Team

Yvonne Uju Ejim (born April 9, 2002) is a Canadian professional basketball player for Azulmarino Mallorca Palma of the Liga Femenina de Baloncesto. She played college basketball at Gonzaga Bulldogs of the West Coast Conference. She is also a member of the Canadian women's national team. She was selected 33rd overall in the 2025 WNBA draft by the Indiana Fever.

== Early life ==
Ejim was born on April 9, 2002 in Calgary, Alberta, Canada. to Otonye Idoniboye and Chucks Ejim. Growing up in Calgary, she played tennis at a young age, later stating that she "wanted to be the next Serena Williams." Ejim started playing basketball after attending a Steve Nash camp at the age of seven, playing for local clubs such as NCBC Thunder.

== High school career ==
Ejim attended Edge School in Rocky View County, Alberta, where she excelled in volleyball, track, tennis, and basketball before deciding to commit exclusively to basketball. In grade 10, she averaged 22.0 points and 13.7 rebounds per game on 55.4 percent shooting. In grade 11, Ejim averaged 24.8 points, 15.5 rebounds, 3.5 assists, and 4.3 steals per game on 56.4 percent shooting. She led her team to its first city championship in 40 years and was named Miss Basketball Alberta. In February 2019, Ejim took part in a Basketball Without Borders Global Camp at the NBA All-Star Weekend in Charlotte, North Carolina. Two months later, she was one of five Canadian girls invited to the Next Generation Showcase at the NCAA Final Four in Tampa, Florida.

Ejim also represented her home province of Alberta in national competitions for several years. At the 2016 Canada Basketball 15U Championships, she led her team in both points (11.5) and rebounds (9.8) per game, earning second-team all-star honours. The following year, Ejim played for Team Alberta at the 2017 Canada Summer Games, scoring 13 points in a 76–63 loss to Team Manitoba in the bronze medal game. In 2018, she averaged 14.4 points and a tournament-high 8.8 rebounds per game to lead her team to a fourth-place finish at the 17U National Championships and again earned second-team all-star honours. Finally, in 2019, Ejim averaged 13.8 points and 6.3 rebounds per game to guide Team Alberta to the silver medal at the 17U National Championships, earning second-team all-star honours for the third time.

=== Recruiting ===
Ejim was one of the highest-ranked Canadian recruits in the class of 2020. By the end of her junior season, she had narrowed her choices down to Gonzaga and Iowa State. On November 13, 2019, she signed her National Letter of Intent to play college basketball at Gonzaga. "I knew Gonzaga was the place I was going to get the best four years out of my life," explained Ejim. "The academics are a bonus, but the family atmosphere and the competitiveness I felt from the university and team was something I really wanted."

== College career ==
=== Freshman season ===
On January 14, 2021, Ejim scored seven points and grabbed two rebounds in a 71–52 victory over Santa Clara. In her next game, on January 16, she posted 10 points and three rebounds on five-for-five shooting in a 76–52 win over San Francisco. Two days later, Ejim was named the West Coast Conference (WCC) Freshman of the Week. Gonzaga reached the WCC tournament championship game in March, where she recorded a season-high 13 points and nine rebounds to lead her team to a 43–42 win over AP No. 15 BYU. Ejim was named to the all-tournament team. As a freshman, Ejim averaged 3.7 points and 2.1 rebounds per game in a limited role off the bench. Despite her limited minutes, she improved her skills throughout the season by working out with teammate Louise Forsythe. "Even though I didn’t get to play much, I truly cherish the moments I had with Lou," Ejim reflected years later.

=== Sophomore season ===
Ahead of her sophomore season in 2021–22, Ejim improved her footwork and her midrange jumper in the summer. Following the graduation of sisters Jenn and LeeAnne Wirth, Ejim took on a larger role on the team. She made her season debut on November 11, 2021, posting 14 points and eight rebounds on seven-of-nine shooting in a 72–47 win over Montana State. On December 12, Ejim recorded six points, 11 rebounds, and a season-high five blocks in a 64–54 victory over Stephen F. Austin. She registered her first career double-double on January 6, 2022, tallying 22 points and 10 rebounds in 21 minutes in a 76–65 win over Portland. On February 7, Ejim scored a team-high 17 points and grabbed eight rebounds in 21 minutes in a 55–49 win over San Francisco. On February 12, she earned her first career start against San Francisco. At the end of the regular season, Ejim was named the WCC Sixth Woman of the Year and earned second-team all-WCC honors.

On March 7, Ejim posted 12 points and a season-high 14 rebounds in a 69–55 victory over San Francisco in the semifinals of the WCC tournament. She scored 11 points in their 71–59 win over AP No. 15 BYU in the title game the next day. In the first round of the NCAA tournament, Ejim recorded 14 points and six rebounds in a 68–55 victory over Nebraska. Gonzaga was then defeated by Louisville in the second round. As a sophomore, Ejim appeared in all 34 games and made one start, averaging 10.1 points, 5.6 rebounds, 1.1 assists, 1.3 steals, and 1.2 blocks per game on 51.6 percent shooting.

=== Junior season ===
Ejim entered her junior season in 2022–23 as a preseason all-WCC selection. On November 10, 2022, she made her season debut, recording 22 points and 10 rebounds in an 80–54 win over Long Beach State. Two days later, Ejim scored 16 points, including her first career three-point shot, and had a season-high four steals in a 91–38 victory over Southern Utah. She was named the WCC Player of the Week for her performance in the first two games of the season. On November 15, Ejim scored 26 points, including the game-winning basket, and grabbed seven rebounds in 24 minutes in a 66–64 win over Wyoming. At the Battle 4 Atlantis tournament in the Bahamas, Ejim posted 13 points and nine rebounds in a 79–67 overtime victory over AP No. 6 Louisville in the first round, followed by a nine-point, 11-rebound performance in a 70–66 loss to Marquette in the semifinals. On November 21, she was named the WCC Player of the Week for the second week in a row for her performances against Wyoming, Louisville, and Marquette. Later that day, Ejim recorded 22 points and nine rebounds and made the game-winning shot in a 73–72 win over AP No. 23 Tennessee in the Battle 4 Atlantis third-place game. On December 6, she scored a career-high 32 points and grabbed seven rebounds, shooting 13-of-17 from the field, in a 73–49 victory over Queens (NC). On December 31, Ejim posted 24 points, eight rebounds, and a season-high three blocks in a 96–51 win over Loyola Marymount.

Ejim registered a double-double in each of her next two games, recording 15 points and 12 rebounds in a 63–52 victory over San Francisco on January 5, 2023, followed by a 16-point, 12-rebound performance in a 78–61 win over Santa Clara two days later. On January 19, she scored 22 points and grabbed 12 rebounds in an 81–78 victory over Pacific. Two days later, on January 21, Ejim had 24 points and four rebounds on nine-of-12 shooting to lead Gonzaga to an 82–57 win over Saint Mary's. On February 2, she posted 26 points, seven rebounds, and a season-high-tying four steals in a 77–72 loss to Santa Clara, snapping their 14-game win streak. In her next game, on February 4, Ejim recorded 16 points and nine rebounds, and hit a buzzer beater at the end of the first quarter from beyond half-court, in a 78–56 win over San Francisco. On February 18, she scored 25 points and grabbed eight rebounds in their final home game of the season, a 65–51 victory over Saint Mary's. In her next game, on February 23, Ejim posted 12 points, 11 rebounds, and four assists in a 73–61 win over San Diego. Two days later, she had 19 points and 10 rebounds on eight-of-11 shooting in a 58–51 victory over BYU to clinch the WCC regular-season title outright. Ejim was named the WCC Player of the Week for her performances against San Diego and BYU. She earned first-team All-WCC honors on the season.

On March 6, Ejim recorded 21 points, 11 rebounds, a season-high five assists, three steals, and two blocks in a 79–64 victory over BYU in the semifinals of the WCC tournament. She followed that up with a 21-point, 14-rebound performance in a 64–60 loss to Portland in the championship game and was named to the all-tournament team. On March 17, Ejim led her team with 19 points and eight rebounds in a 71–48 loss to Ole Miss in the first round of the NCAA tournament. As a junior, she made 33 starts, averaging 16.8 points, 8.4 rebounds, 1.6 assists, and 1.5 steals per game on 53.4 percent shooting. Ejim recorded eight double-doubles and led her team in scoring, rebounding, field goal percentage, and blocks.

=== Senior season ===
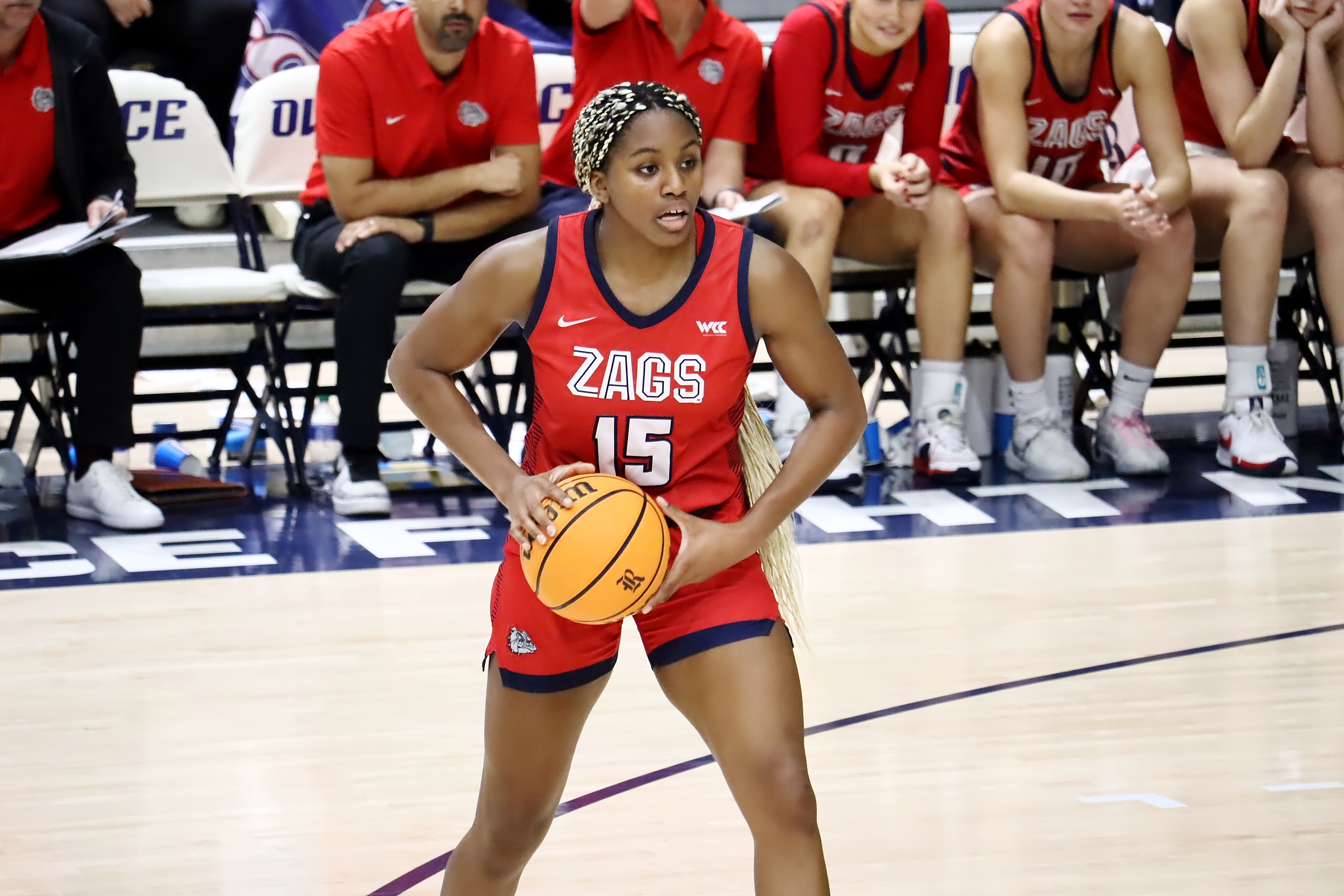
Ejim with Gonzaga in 2023

On November 6, 2023, Ejim made her senior season debut, recording 17 points, eights rebounds, and a season-high five assists in an 83–70 win over Montana. On November 12, she put up 22 points, including 19 in the first half, along with nine rebounds and four assists in a 91–70 victory over Toledo. In her next game, on November 15, Ejim posted 20 points, eight rebounds, three assists, three steals and two blocks in a 83–55 win over North Florida. Three days later, she had 17 points, 10 rebounds, and a season-high-tying five assists in an 80–64 victory over Wyoming. Ejim was named the WCC Player of the Week on November 27 after averaging 18.7 points on 75 percent shooting in three games at the Betty Chancellor Classic, including back-to-back 23-point scoring efforts against Alabama and AP No. 20 Louisville. She earned WCC Player of the Week honors for the second consecutive week after she logged 23 points and 10 rebounds in an 82–80 win over Eastern Washington on November 29, followed by a 27-point, 12-rebound performance in a 96–78 upset win over AP No. 3 Stanford on December 3 – the highest-ranked win in program history. Ejim was also named the Ann Meyers Drysdale National Player of the Week by the USBWA. In her next game, on December 7, she scored 21 points and grabbed nine rebounds in a 78–70 overtime victory over California. Two days later, she recorded 18 points, 10 rebounds, and four assists in an 80–72 win over Rice. Ejim earned the WCC Player of the Week award for the third week in a row. On December 20, she posted 27 points, including 21 in the first half, along with seven rebounds and a season-high four blocks in an 81–69 victory over Arizona at the Jerry Colangelo Classic. In her next game, on December 22, Ejim scored 22 points on nine-of-11 shooting to lead Gonzaga to a 67–54 win over New Mexico in the regular season finale. She earned her fourth WCC Player of the Week award of the season.

On January 13, 2024, Ejim scored 25 points and grabbed 10 rebounds in an 85–67 win over San Diego. In her next game, on January 18, she posted 24 points, 12 rebounds, and three blocks in 26 minutes in a 72–48 victory over Loyola Marymount. On January 25, Ejim recorded 19 points, 13 rebounds, and a season-high-tying five assists in an 82–45 win over Santa Clara. Two days later, on January 27, she had 21 points, including 15 in the first half, and 13 rebounds in a 73–54 victory over San Francisco. Ejim was voted the WCC co-Player of the Week for her performances against Santa Clara and San Francisco, sharing the award with Zeryhia Aokuso of Saint Mary's. On February 3, she logged 21 points, 11 rebounds, three steals, and two blocks in a 104–39 win over Pacific. Ejim missed the next two games – both Gonzaga victories – while on international duty with the Canadian women's national team. On February 17, she put up a season-high 28 points, along with nine rebounds and four assists, in a 91–78 win over Pacific to clinch the WCC regular season title. On February 22, Ejim announced that she would be returning for a fifth season of eligibility, granted due to the COVID-19 pandemic, immediately prior to scoring 20 points and grabbing six rebounds in a 74–48 victory over San Francisco. On February 24, she posted 17 points, 11 rebounds, three assists, and a season-high five steals in a 75–41 win over Pepperdine. Ejim earned her sixth WCC Player of the Week award of the season for her performances against San Francisco and Pepperdine. Gonzaga finished conference play with a perfect 16–0 record and outscored their league opponents by an average of 30.7 points per game. Ejim was named the WCC Player of the Year and WCC Defensive Player of the Year, as well as a first-team All-WCC selection.

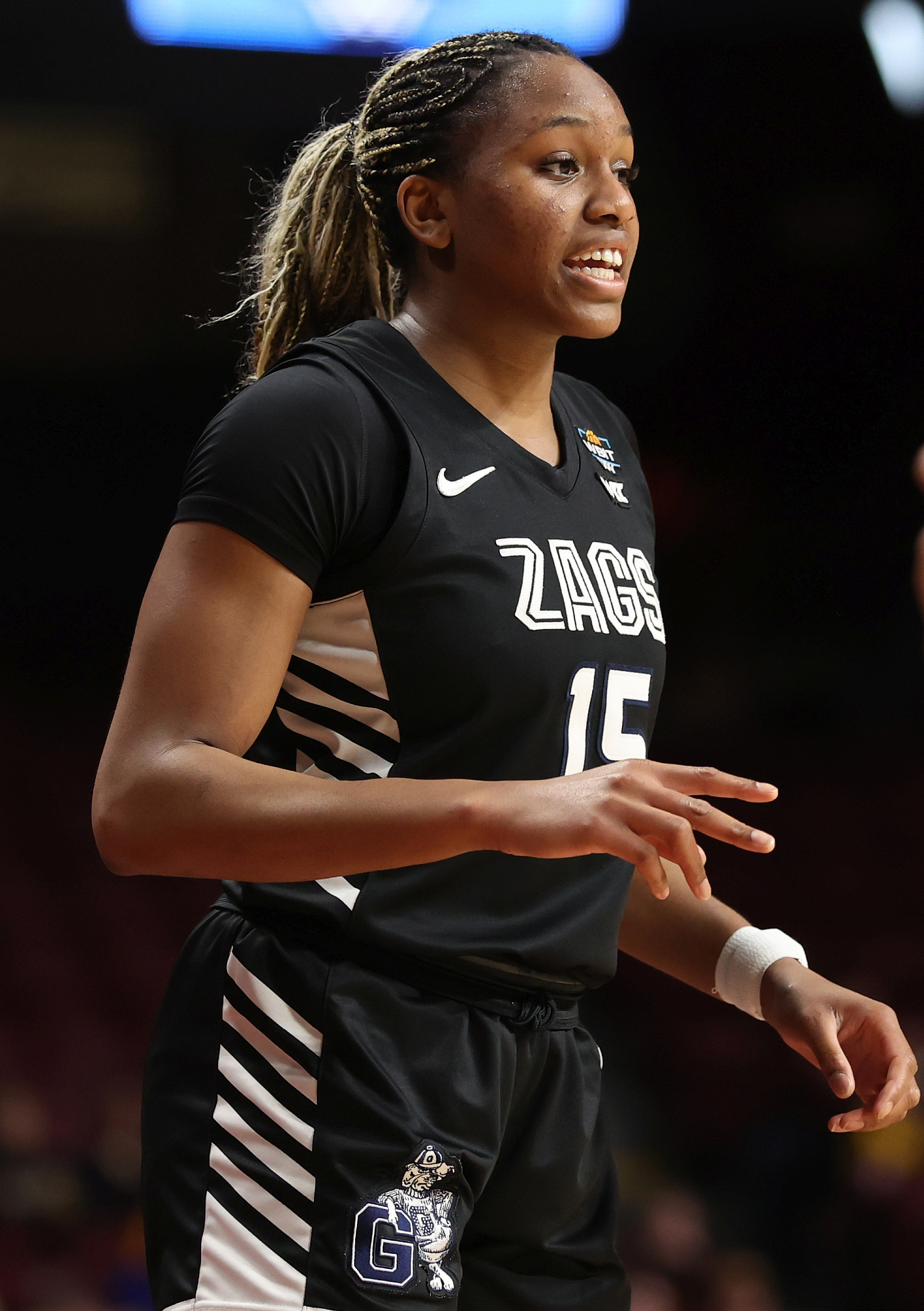
Ejim with Gonzaga in 2025

Ejim helped Gonzaga achieve a runner-up finish at the WCC tournament. She recorded 18 points and 13 rebounds in their 72–61 win over Pacific in the semifinals. However, the Bulldogs suffered a 67–66 defeat to Portland in the championship game; Ejim posted 17 points and 11 rebounds in the loss and was named to the all-tournament team. In the first round of the NCAA tournament, she put up 25 points, 14 rebounds, and four assists in a 75–56 victory over UC Irvine. Ejim scored 17 points and grabbed 13 rebounds in a 77–66 win over AP No. 21 Utah in the second round. Gonzaga reached the Sweet Sixteen, where she had 14 points and five rebounds before fouling out in a 69–47 loss to AP No. 4 Texas. The Bulldogs finished the season at 32–4 – the best record in program history. As a senior, Ejim played in 34 games and averaged 19.7 points, 8.3 rebounds, 2.3 assists, 1.4 steals and one block per game on 60.1 percent shooting. She was named the Becky Hammon Mid-Major Player of the Year and received honorable mention All-American recognition from the Associated Press (AP) and the Women's Basketball Coaches Association (WBCA).

=== Graduate season ===
In the Loyola Marymount game on January 18, 2025, Ejim became the program's all-time rebounding record holder.
In the San Diego game on January 30, 2025, Ejim made history by becoming the first WCC women's basketball player to score 2,000 points and grabbing 1,000 rebounds in their career.
In the St. Mary's game on February 6, 2025, Ejim broke the program's all-time points record with a little over 1 minute left in the first half.
She finished the game with 27 points altogether.

== Professional career ==
On April 14, 2025, Ejim was selected 33rd overall in the 2025 WNBA draft by the Indiana Fever. On May 7, she was waived by the Fever.

== National team career ==
=== Junior national team ===
Ejim represented the Canada national under-16 team at the 2017 FIBA Under-16 Women's Americas Championship in Buenos Aires, Argentina. In five games, she averaged 5.8 points and six rebounds per game, helping her team win the silver medal. In 2018, Ejim joined the national under-17 team for a tune-up tournament in Latvia, averaging 5.7 points and 5.7 rebounds in three games. Later that year, she played at the 2018 FIBA Under-17 Women's World Cup in Minsk, Belarus, where she averaged 6.9 points, 6.9 rebounds, and 1.7 assists in seven games. Canada finished in ninth place.

At the 2019 FIBA Under-19 Women's Basketball World Cup in Bangkok, Thailand, Ejim averaged 0.7 points and two rebounds per game in a limited role as Canada finished in sixth place. Two years later, she played in the 2021 FIBA Under-19 Women's Basketball World Cup in Debrecen, Hungary, where she averaged 13.4 points and 9.4 rebounds in seven games and guided Canada to a fifth-place finish. She led her team with 12 points and 13 rebounds in a 72–61 win over the Czech Republic in the fifth-place game.

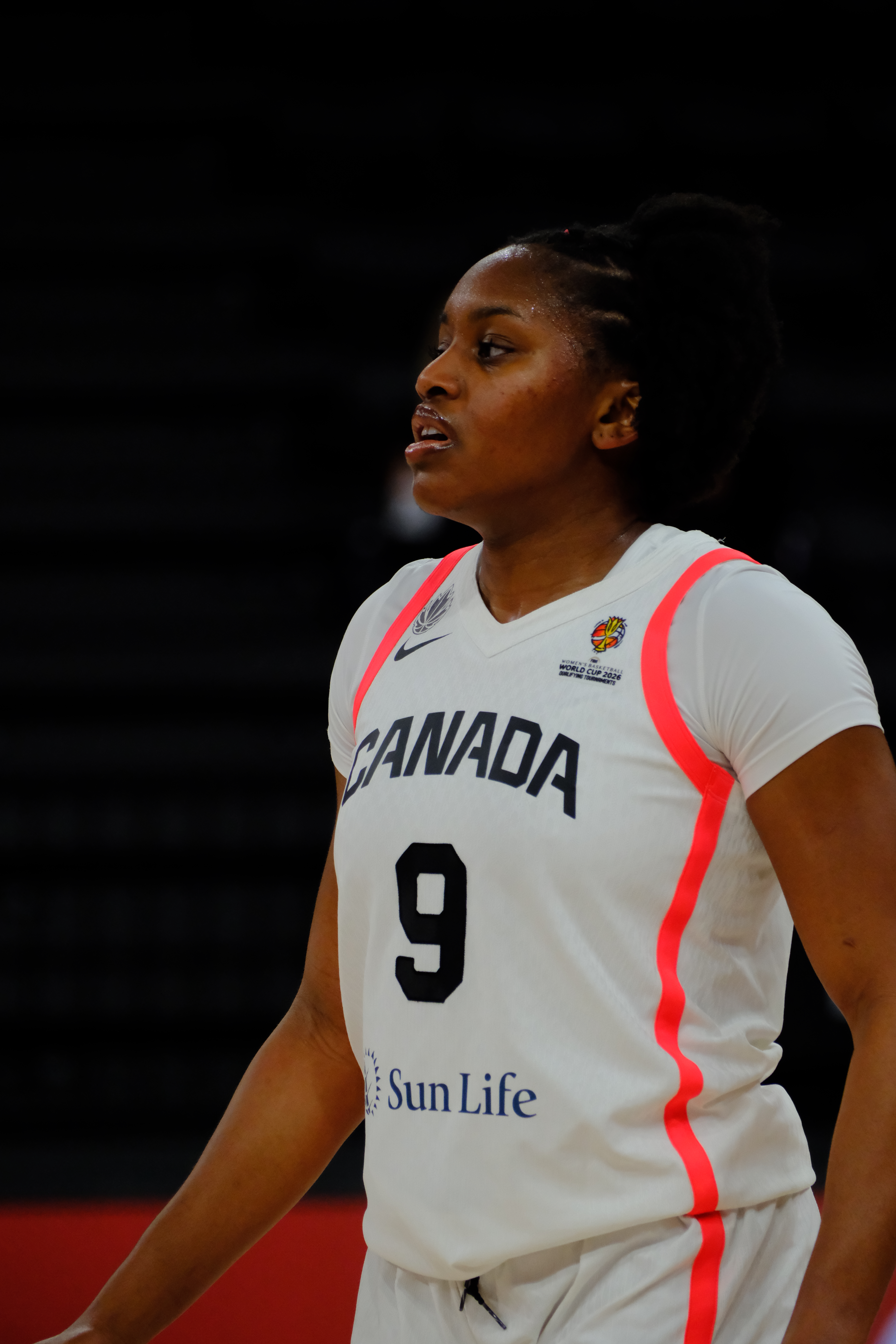
Ejim with Canada during the 2026 FIBA Women's World Cup qualifiers.

In July 2022, Ejim helped the national under-23 team to a gold medal at the inaugural GLOBL JAM, a competition "put on by Canada Basketball and Sportsnet to fill the gap between Under-19 and senior-level FIBA competitions." In the semifinals, she recorded six points, 13 rebounds, and five blocks in an 85–60 win over the United States. (Note: The United States was represented by the VCU Rams women's basketball team.) In the championship game, Ejim posted nine points and eight rebounds in a 78–60 victory over France.

=== Senior national team ===
Ejim earned her maiden call-up to the senior national team ahead of the 2023 FIBA Women's AmeriCup. In seven games, she averaged 7.9 points and 4.3 rebounds per game, helping her team win the bronze medal. During her senior season at Gonzaga, Ejim convinced her coaching staff to allow her to take a few weeks off to represent Canada at their Olympic Qualifying Tournament in Hungary in February 2024. "I know that this opportunity that I have with Canada basketball, it does come once in a lifetime sometimes," she said. "So just really understanding that and honestly just advocating for myself to be able to go."

Ejim represented Canada at the 2026 FIBA Women's Basketball World Cup Qualifying Tournaments. In five games, she averaged 4.2 points per game and 4.6 rebounds per game as Canada failed to qualify from their tournament.

== Career statistics ==
Legend
GP	Games played	GS	Games started	MPG	Minutes per game	RPG	Rebounds per game
APG	Assists per game	SPG	Steals per game	BPG	Blocks per game	PPG	Points per game
TO	Turnovers per game	FG%	Field-goal percentage	3P%	3-point field-goal percentage	FT%	Free-throw percentage
**Bold**	Career best	°	League leader

=== College ===
Year	Team	GP	GS	MPG	FG%	3P%	FT%	RPG	APG	SPG	BPG	TO	PPG
2020–21	Gonzaga	25	0	6.5	**60.6**	0.0	54.2	2.1	0.2	0.3	0.2	**0.5**	3.7
2021–22	Gonzaga	34	1	20.8	51.6	0.0	70.0	5.6	1.1	1.3	**1.2**	2.2	10.1
2022–23	Gonzaga	33	33	27.5	53.4	**31.3**	80.1	8.4	1.6	**1.5**	0.9	2.3	16.8
2023–24	Gonzaga	34	33	27.3	60.1°	14.3	**81.5**	8.7	2.3	1.4	1.0	1.8	19.7°
2024–25	Gonzaga	**35**	**35**	**31.2**	53.1	25.5	78.4	**9.3**°	**2.5**	1.3	1.0	3.0	**20.7**°
**Career**		161	102	23.6	55.1	24.7	77.2	7.1	1.6	1.2	0.9	2.0	14.8
Statistics retrieved from Sports-Reference.

== Player profile ==
Ejim stands 6 feet 1 inch (1.85 m) tall and plays the forward position as a "traditional post" player. During her junior year at Gonzaga, Oren Weisfeld of Sportsnet described her as "an undersized big who uses her long arms to poke the ball free and her athleticism to out-leap similar-sized players for rebounds." Later that season, Jim Allen of The Spokesman-Review called Ejim "a premier forward with one of the best high post moves in the country." Two months into her senior season, Charlie Creme of ESPN ranked her as the 25th best player in college basketball, and remarked that her "elite footwork and quick moves, using either hand, allow her to regularly outmaneuver taller defenders in the post, where she does her best work." As her college career came to an end, Seth Sommerfeld of Inlander opined that despite being officially listed as a forward, Ejim was "actually a slightly undersized center" who took advantage of her "athleticism, touch, drive and footwork" to outmaneuver her opponents.

== Personal life ==
Ejim is of Nigerian descent. She has ten siblings: four older brothers, three younger brothers and three younger sisters. Four of her brothers played professional basketball: Melvin, Ryan, Kenny and Deon.

In the aftermath of the murder of George Floyd and the resulting protests, Ejim and her Gonzaga teammates participated in "a pregame video that called for social and racial justice." Ejim was also one of several Gonzaga players to kneel during the national anthem, which garnered both praise and criticism from fans. "The movement was always there," she said of the struggle for racial equality. “With George Floyd, it escalated more, but it's a thing that never really stopped.
