= Edge School =

Private school in Rock View County, Alberta, Canada

Location
- Rocky View County, Alberta, T3Z 1L4; Canada; 51.0945413°N 114.3582538°W

Information
- School type: Private/Independent
- Founded: 1999
- Status: Open
- Principal: Ed Polhill
- Head of school: Keith Taylor
- Grades: 4–12
- Enrollment: 300+
- Average class size: 14
- Language: English
- Campus: Rural
- Houses: Everest, Kilimanjaro, Logan, and Makalu
- Colour
- Athletics: Basketball, Dance, Figure Skating, Golf, Hockey, Soccer
- Website: edgeschool.com

Edge School is an independent school located in the Rocky View County, just west of Calgary, Alberta, Canada. Edge School offers training in dance, golf, hockey, soccer, figure skating, basketball, and a flex program for students who would like to pursue a sport other than those currently offered. Edge follows a three-sphere philosophy – academics, athletics and character development of students - which aims to prepare students for either post secondary education or a career in their chosen sport.

== History ==
The school was founded in 1999 by Brent Devost, and combines athletics with a strong emphasis on academics.

In 2008, Edge built a new 170,000 square foot facility with complete academic amenities and a sports complex.

== Jim Davidson Sports Complex ==
The Jim Davidson Sports Complex is an athletic, recreational and community-use facility. Inside the 90,000 sq. ft. complex there are 2 NHL-sized arenas, Founders & Alumni Lounge, gymnasium with 2 NBA-sized courts, high-performance training centre, 3 professional dance studios, golf centre, and a sports medicine clinic.

== Alumni ==
- Thomas Hickey (New York Islanders)
- Joe Colborne (Colorado Avalanche)
- Tyler Myers (Vancouver Canucks)
- Matt Dumba (Minnesota Wild)
- Jake Bean (Carolina Hurricanes)
- Jaret Anderson-Dolan (Los Angeles Kings)
- Jacob Bernard-Docker (Detroit Red Wings)
- Taro Hirose (Detroit Red Wings)
- Yvonne Ejim (Gonzaga Bulldogs women's basketball)
