= Canada women's national basketball team =

Women's national basketball team representing Canada

Canada
- FIBA ranking: 11 ▼4 (September 14, 2026)
- FIBA zone: FIBA Americas
- National federation: Canada Basketball
- Coach: Nell Fortner
- Nickname: Team Canada

Olympic Games
- Appearances: 8
- Medals: None

World Cup
- Appearances: 12
- Medals: (bronze) Bronze: (1979, 1986)

FIBA AmeriCup
- Appearances: 19
- Medals: (gold) Gold: (1995, 2015, 2017); (silver) Silver: (2013, 2019); (bronze) Bronze: (1989, 1993, 1999, 2003, 2005, 2009, 2011, 2023, 2025)
Home	Away

First international
- Brazil 66–43 Canada (Mexico City, Mexico; March 14, 1955)

Biggest win
- Canada 111–36 Dominican Republic (Edmonton, Alberta, Canada; August 11, 2015)

Biggest defeat
- Canada 51–115 Soviet Union (Montreal, Quebec, Canada; July 19, 1976)
Medal record
Women's basketball
FIBA Women's World Cup
Bronze medal – third place	1979 South Korea
Bronze medal – third place	1986 Soviet Union
FIBA Women's AmeriCup
Gold medal – first place	1995 Canada
Gold medal – first place	2015 Canada
Gold medal – first place	2017 Argentina
Silver medal – second place	2013 Mexico
Silver medal – second place	2019 Puerto Rico
Bronze medal – third place	1989 Brazil
Bronze medal – third place	1993 Brazil
Bronze medal – third place	1999 Cuba
Bronze medal – third place	2003 Mexico
Bronze medal – third place	2005 Dominican Republic
Bronze medal – third place	2009 Brazil
Bronze medal – third place	2011 Colombia
Bronze medal – third place	2023 Mexico
Bronze medal – third place	2025 Chile
Pan American Games
Gold medal – first place	2015 Toronto	Team

The Canada women's national basketball team (French: Équipe du Canada de basketball féminine) represents Canada in international basketball competitions. They are overseen by Canada Basketball, the governing body for basketball in Canada.

== History ==
=== 2015 Pan American Games ===
The Canada women's national basketball team participated in basketball at the 2015 Pan American Games held in Toronto, Ontario, Canada from July 10 to 26, 2015. Canada opened the preliminary rounds with an easy 101–38 win over Venezuela. The following day they beat Argentina 73–58. The final preliminary game was against Cuba; both teams were 2–0, so the winner would win the group. The game went down to the wire with Canada eking out a 71–68 win. Canada would face Brazil in the semi-final.

Canada opened the semi-final with an 11–2 run on seven consecutive points by Miranda Ayim. Miah-Marie Langlois contributed five assists. In the third quarter Canada strongly out rebounded Brazil and hit 69% of their field goals to score 33 points in the quarter. Lizanne Murphy and Nirra Fields hit three-pointers to help extend the lead to 68–39 at the end of three-quarters. Canada continued to dominate in the fourth quarter with three-pointers by Nurse and Kim Gaucher. Canada went on to win the game 91–63 to earn a spot in the gold-medal game against the United States.

The gold-medal game matched up the host team Canada against the United States, in a sold-out arena dominated by fans in red and white and waving the Canadian flag. The Canadian team, arm in arm, sang "O Canada" as the respective national anthems were played.

After trading baskets early the U.S. edged out to a double-digit lead in the second quarter. However the Canadians, with the home crowd cheering, tied up the game at halftime. In the third quarter Canada outscored the U.S. 26–15. The lead would reach as high as 18 points. The U.S. would fight back, but not all the way and Canada won the game and the gold-medal 81–73. It was Canada's first gold-medal in basketball in the Pan American games. Kia Nurse was the star for Canada with 33 points, hitting 11 of her 12 free-throw attempts in 10 of her 17 field-goal attempts including two of three three-pointers.

=== 2015 FIBA Americas Women's Championship ===
Canada participated at the 2015 FIBA Americas Women's Championship, a qualifying event used to determine invitations to the 2016 Olympics. The games were held in Edmonton, Alberta, Canada in August 2015. Canada was assigned to Group A and played Puerto Rico, Chile, the Dominican Republic and Cuba in the preliminary rounds. Canada won the first three games easily with a 94–57 win over Puerto Rico as the closest match. The final preliminary round game was against undefeated Cuba, a team Canada had faced in the Pan American games. Cuba played well in that event and was expected to challenge Canada. However, Canada defeated Cuba 92–43 to win first place in the group for a spot in the semi-final against the second-place team in group B, Brazil.

The semi-final game against Brazil was much closer. Canada led by only six points at halftime but gradually expanded the lead to end up with an 83–66 win, and a spot in the gold-medal game. The gold-medal game was a rematch with Cuba who won their semi-final game against Argentina. Despite the lopsided result in the preliminary rounds, Canada expected a closer game. Cuba started off strong and had an eight-point lead early in the game. Canada responded with a 16–0 run to take over the lead, but Cuba responded and took a small lead early in the second half. Then Canada took the lead back and gradually expanded the lead to end up with the win, 82–66. As the game wound down to the close, the crowd was chanting "Rio","Rio","Rio" in recognition of the fact that the win qualifies Canada for the Olympics in Rio in 2016.

=== 2017–2020 ===
Coming off a gold medal at the 13th edition of the FIBA Women's AmeriCup, Canada entered the 2017 FIBA Women's AmeriCup as favourites. They finished group play with a 4–0 record, and advanced to the semifinals. In the finals, they would beat host nation Argentina 65–67 to win their second straight title. Nirra Fields was named MVP of the tournament. By virtue of finishing top three, they also qualified for 2018 FIBA Women's Basketball World Cup.

The Canadians made their debut at the 2018 Commonwealth Games on the Gold Coast, narrowly missing out on a podium finish, losing to New Zealand 74–68 in the third place game.

Trying to build off their third best showing at FIBA's premier international tournament, Canada entered the 2018 FIBA Women's Basketball World Cup being drawn in Group A, with France, Greece, and South Korea. Canada went as far as the quarterfinals, where they lost 53–68 to Spain.

Canada had one last change to qualify for the Summer Olympics in Tokyo, participating at the 2020 FIBA Women's Olympic Qualifying Tournaments – Ostend. Canada would go on to top their group and qualified to the 2020 Summer Olympics.

In Tokyo, Canada were drawn to Group A with Spain, Serbia, and South Korea. They would finish with a 1–2 record with their only win against South Korea.

=== 2021–2024 ===
With the approaching 2022 FIBA Women's World Cup, Canada Basketball hired Fenerbahçe head coach Víctor Lapeña to lead its women's program through the World Cup and possibly the 2024 Summer Olympics in Paris.

At the 19th edition of the FIBA Women's Basketball World Cup, Canada was drawn in Group B. They ended group play with a 4–1 record, with their only loss being to group leaders Australia. In the knockout stage, Canada advanced all the way to the semifinals where they would eventually lose 43–83 to the United States. In the third place game, Canada fell 95-65 to Australia. The 4th place finish was Team Canada's best showing since winning bronze at the 1986 FIBA World Championship for Women. With her efforts in the tournament, Bridget Carleton was named to the All-Tournament Team.

In 2023, Canada participated at the 2023 FIBA Women's AmeriCup, where they were drawn into Group B. In the preliminary round, they would go on to top their group with a perfect 4–0 record, advancing to the quarterfinals. In the knockout stage, they would beat Argentina, and then lose a nail-biter to the United States, in the semifinals. In the third place game, Canada would beat Puerto Rico 73–80 to win the bronze medal.

By finishing as one of the top five teams in the tournament, Canada qualified to the FIBA Americas Women's Olympic Pre-Qualifying Tournament. At the 2024 Summer Olympics, Canada was drawn in Group B with hosts France. Canada lost all three of their group play games and did not advance through the tournament.

=== 2025–present ===
On May 5, 2025, Canada Basketball named Nell Fortner as the next head coach of the Senior Women’s National Team—signalling the start of a new chapter as the team enters a transitional period.

At the 2025 FIBA Women's AmeriCup, Canada began their group play with wins over El Salvador and Argentina before splitting their remaining game to finish the round-robin with a 3–1 record. Canada would ultimately fall to the United States in the semi-finals. In the third place game, Canada would win 75–76 against Argentina, in double overtime, to win the bronze medal. For their efforts, both Syla Swords and Kayla Alexander (All-Second Team) were named to the All-Tournament Team.

== Results and fixtures ==
Win Loss Fixture

=== 2024 ===
February 8, 2024 2024 FIBA Women's Olympic Qualifying Tournament	Hungary	55–67	Canada	Sopron, Hungary
19:00	Scoring by quarter: 11-25, 19-16, 9-14, 16-12
		Boxscore		Arena: Aréna Sopron

February 9, 2024 2024 FIBA Women's Olympic Qualifying Tournament	Canada	55–60	Spain	Sopron, Hungary
15:30
		Boxscore		Arena: Aréna Sopron

February 11, 2024 2024 FIBA Women's Olympic Qualifying Tournament	Canada	82–86	Japan	Sopron, Hungary
15:00	Scoring by quarter: 20-20, 26-30, 21-20, 15-16
		Boxscore		Arena: Aréna Sopron

29 July 2024 2024 Summer Olympics - Group stage	Canada	54–75	France	Pierre Mauroy Stadium, Lille
17:15	Scoring by quarter: 18-15, 2-23, 16-15, 18-21
	Pts: Colley, Nurse 11; Rebs: Alexander 10; Asts: Colley 6	Boxscore	Pts: Badiane 13; Rebs: Badiane 6 Asts: Williams 8	Attendance: 20,211; Referees: Boris Krejić (SLO), Blanca Burns (USA), Ariadna Chueca (ESP)

1 August 2024 2024 Summer Olympics - Group stage	Australia	70–65	Canada	Pierre Mauroy Stadium, Lille
13:30	Scoring by quarter: 18-16, 20-16, 13-12, 19-21
		Boxscore

4 August 2024 2024 Summer Olympics - Group stage	Canada	70–79	Nigeria	Pierre Mauroy Stadium, Lille
13:30
		Boxscore

=== 2025 ===
June 28, 2025 2025 FIBA Women's AmeriCup – Group stage	El Salvador	34–100	Canada	Santiago, Chile
--:-- UTC−4	Scoring by quarter: 9–26, 16–32, 5–18, 4–24
	Pts: Escobar, Villalobos 8 Rebs: Villalobos 6 Asts: four players 1	Boxscore	Pts: Wallack 11; Rebs: Ejim 12; Asts: Colley 8	Arena: Centro de Deportes Colectivos; Attendance: 150; Referees: Krishna Domínguez (MEX), Roberto Fernández (CRC), Claudio Osorio (CHI)

June 29, 2025 2025 FIBA Women's AmeriCup – Group stage	Canada	71–48	Argentina	Santiago, Chile
--:-- UTC−4	Scoring by quarter: 20–12, 15–8, 23–14, 13–14
	Pts: Day-Wilson 18; Rebs: Ejim 12; Asts: Day-Wilson, Swords 4	Boxscore	Pts: Boquete 12; Rebs: Gentinetta 6 Asts: Gretter 6	Arena: Centro de Deportes Colectivos; Referees: Julirys Guzmán (PUR), Krishna Domínguez (MEX), Claudio Osorio (CHI)

June 30, 2025 2025 FIBA Women's AmeriCup – Group stage	Brazil	74–65	Canada	Santiago, Chile
--:-- UTC−4	Scoring by quarter: 20–17, 14–21, 25–22, 15–5
	Pts: Dantas 20; Rebs: Dantas 14; Asts: three players 4	Boxscore	Pts: Day-Wilson 14; Rebs: Alexander 12; Asts: Day-Wilson 5	Arena: Centro de Deportes Colectivos; Referees: Carmelo de la Rosa (PUR), Lauren Niemiera (USA), Julirys Guzmán (PUR)

July 2, 2025 2025 FIBA Women's AmeriCup – Group stage	Canada	82–46	Dominican Republic	Santiago, Chile
--:-- UTC−4	Scoring by quarter: 23–9, 24–10, 12–14, 23–13
	Pts: Gibb 21; Rebs: Alexander 11; Asts: Day-Wilson 8	Boxscore	Pts: Capellan 17; Rebs: Capella, Reynoso 6 Asts: three players 2	Arena: Centro de Deportes Colectivos; Referees: Lauren Niemiera (USA), Aline García (URU), Claudio Osorio (CHI)

July 4, 2025 2025 FIBA Women's AmeriCup – Quarter-finals	Canada	73–49	Colombia	Santiago, Chile
--:-- UTC−4	Scoring by quarter: 13–6, 24–10, 21–12, 15–21
	Pts: Colley, Ejim 12; Rebs: K. Alexander 9 Asts: three players 3	Boxscore	Pts: Delgado 14; Rebs: Y. Paz 6 Asts: C. López, Vente 4	Arena: Centro de Deportes Colectivos; Referees: Juan Fernández (ARG), Diego Chiconato (BRA), Claudio Osorio (CHI)

July 5, 2025 2025 FIBA Women's AmeriCup – Semi-finals	United States	65–53	Canada	Santiago, Chile
--:-- UTC−4	Scoring by quarter: 12–14, 19–19, 20–15, 14–5
	Pts: Hidalgo 19; Rebs: four players 5 Asts: Hidalgo 4	Boxscore	Pts: Alexander 10; Rebs: Alexander 13; Asts: Swords 4	Arena: Centro de Deportes Colectivos; Referees: Krishna Domínguez (MEX), Aline García (URU), Yezid Carreño (COL)

July 6, 2025 2025 FIBA Women's AmeriCup – Third place game	Argentina	75–76(OT)	Canada	Santiago, Chile
--:-- UTC−4	Scoring by quarter: 16–19, 18–12, 8–16, 17–12, Overtime: 8–8, 8–9
	Pts: D'Urso 22; Rebs: Cabrera 12; Asts: Gretter 5	Boxscore	Pts: Swords 23; Rebs: Ejim 16; Asts: Day-Wilson, Gibb 4	Arena: Centro de Deportes Colectivos; Referees: Carmelo de la Rosa (PUR), Lauren Niemiera (USA), Julirys Guzmán (PUR)

== Team ==
=== Current roster ===
Roster for the 2025 FIBA Women's AmeriCup.

Canada women's national basketball team roster
Players
Coaches

Pos.	No.	Name	Age – Date of birth	Height	Club	Ctr.
G	2	Shay Colley	29 – 6 January 1996	1.76 m (5 ft 9 in)	Chartres	(France)
G	3	Delaney Gibb	19 – 27 August 2005	1.79 m (5 ft 10 in)	BYU Cougars	(United States)
G	4	Sami Hill	30 – 22 November 1994	1.78 m (5 ft 10 in)	Araski	(Spain)
F	7	Niyah Becker	24 – 14 October 2000	1.88 m (6 ft 2 in)	CB Islas Canarias	(Spain)
SF	8	Tara Wallack	21 – 2 July 2003	1.81 m (5 ft 11 in)	Tarbes Gespe Bigorre	(France)
PF	9	Yvonne Ejim	23 – 9 April 2002	1.83 m (6 ft 0 in)	IDK Euskotren	(Spain)
C	10	Emily Potter	29 – 10 October 1995	1.96 m (6 ft 5 in)	ŽKK Crvena zvezda	(Serbia)
G	12	Syla Swords	19 – 28 January 2006	1.83 m (6 ft 0 in)	Michigan Wolverines	(United States)
SG	13	Merissah Russell	23 – 3 March 2002	1.80 m (5 ft 11 in)	Louisville Cardinals	(United States)
C	14	Kayla Alexander (C)	34 – 5 January 1991	1.93 m (6 ft 4 in)	Valencia Basket	(Spain)
C	15	Phillipina Kyei	21 – 5 October 2003	2.01 m (6 ft 7 in)	Maccabi Haifa	(Israel)
PG	30	Shayeann Day-Wilson	22 – 16 June 2003	1.67 m (5 ft 6 in)	LSU Tigers	(United States)

Head coach

- (United States) Nell Fortner

Assistant coach(es)

- (Canada) Carly Clarke

Legend

- (C) Team captain
- Club – describes last
  club before the tournament
- Age – describes age
  on 28 June 2025

=== Head coaches ===
- (Canada) Lisa Thomaidis: 2014–2021
- (Spain) Victor Lapena: 2022–2025
- (United States) Nell Fortner: 2025–present

== Competitive record ==
Champions Runners-up Third place Fourth place Tournament played fully or partially on home soil

=== Olympic Games ===
Olympic Games record
Year	Round	Position	Pld	W	L	PF	PA	Squad
(Canada) 1976	Preliminary round	6th	5	0	5	336	477	Squad
(Soviet Union) 1980	Did not qualify							
(United States) 1984	Fourth place	4th	6	2	3	370	398	Squad
(South Korea) 1988	Did not qualify							
(Spain) 1992	Did not qualify							
(United States) 1996	Preliminary round	11th	7	3	4	460	486	Squad
(Australia) 2000	Preliminary round	10th	6	2	4	371	384	Squad
(Greece) 2004	Did not qualify							
(China) 2008	Did not qualify							
(England) 2012	Quarter-finals	8th	6	2	4	376	423	Squad
(Brazil) 2016	Quarter-finals	7th	6	3	3	403	415	Squad
(Japan) 2020	Preliminary round	8th	3	1	2	208	201	Squad
(France) 2024	Preliminary round	11th	3	1	3	189	224	Squad
(United States) 2028	To be determined							
(Australia) 2032	To be determined							
Total	Fourth place	8/13	26	14	25	2,713	3,008	—N/a

=== FIBA Women's World Cup ===
- 1971 – 10th place
- 1975 – 11th place
- 1979 – Third place
- 1983 – 9th place
- 1986 – Third place
- 1990 – 7th place
- 1994 – 7th place
- 2006 – 11th place
- 2010 – 12th place
- 2014 – 5th place
- 2018 – 7th place
- 2022 – 4th place

=== FIBA Women's AmeriCup ===
- 1989 – Third place
- 1993 – Third place
- 1995 – First place
- 1997 – 5th place
- 1999 – Third place
- 2001 – 4th place
- 2003 – Third place
- 2005 – Third place
- 2007 – 5th place
- 2009 – Third place
- 2011 – Third place
- 2013 – Second place
- 2015 – First place
- 2017 – First place
- 2019 – Second place
- 2021 – 4th place
- 2023 – Third place
- 2025 – Third place
- 2027 – Qualified

=== Pan American Games ===
- 1955 – 5th place
- 1959 – 4th place
- 1963 – 4th place
- 1967 – Third place
- 1971 – 5th place
- 1975 – 5th place
- 1979 – Third place
- 1983 – 4th place
- 1987 – Third place
- 1991 – 4th place
- 1995 – Cancelled
- 1999 – Second place
- 2003 – 4th place
- 2007 – 4th place
- 2011 – 6th place
- 2015 – First place
- 2019 – 6th place

=== Commonwealth Games ===
- 2018 – 4th place

== See also ==
- Canada men's national basketball team
- Canada women's national under-19 basketball team
- Canada women's national under-17 basketball team
- Basketball in Canada
