= 2024 FIBA Women's Olympic Qualifying Tournaments =

2024 FIBA Olympic Qualifying Tournaments
For Women

Tournament details
- Host country: China; Belgium; Brazil; Hungary
- Dates: 8–11 February
- Teams: 16 (from 4 federations)
- Venues: 4 (in 4 host cities)

The 2024 FIBA Women's Olympic Qualifying Tournaments were the four women's basketball tournaments contested by 16 national teams, where the top teams earned a place in the 2024 Summer Olympics basketball tournament. It was held from 8 to 11 February 2024.

== Format ==
The 16 teams were divided into four groups (Groups A–D) for the qualifying tournaments.

== Teams ==
Qualification method	Date	Venue	Berths	Qualified team
2022 FIBA Women's Basketball World Cup	22 September –1 October 2022	(Australia) Sydney	1	United States
EuroBasket Women 2023	15–25 June 2023	(Slovenia) Ljubljana (Israel) Tel Aviv	6	Belgium
EuroBasket Women 2023	15–25 June 2023	(Slovenia) Ljubljana (Israel) Tel Aviv	6	Spain
EuroBasket Women 2023	15–25 June 2023	(Slovenia) Ljubljana (Israel) Tel Aviv	6	France
EuroBasket Women 2023	15–25 June 2023	(Slovenia) Ljubljana (Israel) Tel Aviv	6	Hungary
EuroBasket Women 2023	15–25 June 2023	(Slovenia) Ljubljana (Israel) Tel Aviv	6	Serbia
EuroBasket Women 2023	15–25 June 2023	(Slovenia) Ljubljana (Israel) Tel Aviv	6	Germany
2023 FIBA Women's Asia Cup	26 June – 2 July 2023	(Australia) Sydney	4	China
2023 FIBA Women's Asia Cup	26 June – 2 July 2023	(Australia) Sydney	4	Japan
2023 FIBA Women's Asia Cup	26 June – 2 July 2023	(Australia) Sydney	4	Australia
2023 FIBA Women's Asia Cup	26 June – 2 July 2023	(Australia) Sydney	4	New Zealand
2023 FIBA Women's AmeriCup	1–9 July 2023	(Mexico) León	1	Brazil
2023 Women's Afrobasket	28 July – 6 August 2023	(Rwanda) Kigali	2	Nigeria
2023 Women's Afrobasket	28 July – 6 August 2023	(Rwanda) Kigali	2	Senegal
FIBA Women's Olympic Pre-Qualifying Tournament – Americas	9–12 November 2023	(Colombia) Medellín	2	Canada
FIBA Women's Olympic Pre-Qualifying Tournament – Americas	9–12 November 2023	(Colombia) Medellín	2	Puerto Rico
Total			16	

== Draw ==
The draw took place on 5 October 2023.

=== Seeding ===
The seeding was announced on 4 October 2023 and was based on the FIBA Women's World Rankings.

Pot 1
Team	Pos
United States	1
China	2
Australia	3
Spain	4

Pot 2
Team	Pos
Canada (Note: This spot would eventually be occupied by Canada, who were at the time of the draw was ranked 5th.)	5
Belgium	6
France	7
Brazil	8

Pot 3
Team	Pos
Japan	9
Serbia	10
Nigeria	11
Puerto Rico (Note: This spot would eventually be occupied by Puerto Rico, who were at the time of the draw was ranked 12th.)	12

Pot 4
Team	Pos
Hungary	19
Senegal	20
New Zealand	23
Germany	25

The following draw principles applied:

- The four hosts (Belgium, Brazil, China and Hungary) were automatically allocated to the tournament in their country.
- France and USA could not be drawn into the same tournament.
- Each tournament had to have a minimum of one and a maximum of two European teams.
- China and Japan could not be drawn into the same tournament.
- Australia and New Zealand could not be drawn into the same tournament.
- Each tournament had to contain one team from the Americas.
- The two African teams, Nigeria and Senegal, had to be drawn into the same tournament to ensure all regions are represented at the Olympic basketball tournament.

== Tournaments ==
=== Tournament 1 ===
The tournament was held in Xi'an, China.

Pos	Team	Pld	W	L	PF	PA	PD	Pts	Qualification
1	France (Note: France was already qualified as the host nation.)	3	3	0	264	129	+135	6	Summer Olympics
2	China (H)	3	2	1	249	198	+51	5	Summer Olympics
3	Puerto Rico	3	1	2	178	260	−82	4	Summer Olympics
4	New Zealand	3	0	3	153	257	−104	3	

Source: FIBA
Rules for classification: 1) Points; 2) Head-to-head results; 3) Points difference; 4) Points scored.
(H) Hosts

=== Tournament 2 ===
The tournament was held in Antwerp, Belgium.

Pos	Team	Pld	W	L	PF	PA	PD	Pts	Qualification
1	United States (Note: The United States was already qualified as World Cup winners.)	3	3	0	282	164	+118	6	Summer Olympics
2	Belgium (H)	3	2	1	254	208	+46	5	Summer Olympics
3	Nigeria	3	1	2	179	243	−64	4	Summer Olympics
4	Senegal	3	0	3	170	270	−100	3	

Source: FIBA
Rules for classification: 1) Points; 2) Head-to-head results; 3) Points difference; 4) Points scored.
(H) Hosts

=== Tournament 3 ===
The tournament was held in Belém, Brazil.

Pos	Team	Pld	W	L	PF	PA	PD	Pts	Qualification
1	Australia	3	3	0	220	180	+40	6	Summer Olympics
2	Germany	3	2	1	198	222	−24	5	Summer Olympics
3	Serbia	3	1	2	211	213	−2	4	Summer Olympics
4	Brazil (H)	3	0	3	191	205	−14	3	

Source: FIBA
Rules for classification: 1) Points; 2) Head-to-head results; 3) Points difference; 4) Points scored.
(H) Hosts

=== Tournament 4 ===
The tournament was held in Sopron, Hungary.

Pos	Team	Pld	W	L	PF	PA	PD	Pts	Qualification
1	Japan	3	2	1	247	238	+9	5 (Note: Spain 75−86 Japan)	Summer Olympics
2	Spain	3	2	1	208	213	−5	5	Summer Olympics
3	Canada	3	1	2	204	201	+3	4 (Note: Hungary 55−67 Canada)	Summer Olympics
4	Hungary (H)	3	1	2	208	215	−7	4	

Source: FIBA
Rules for classification: 1) Points; 2) Head-to-head results; 3) Points difference; 4) Points scored.
(H) Hosts

== See also ==
- 2024 FIBA Men's Olympic Qualifying Tournaments
- Basketball at the 2024 Summer Olympics
