= Víctor Lapeña =

Spanish basketball coach

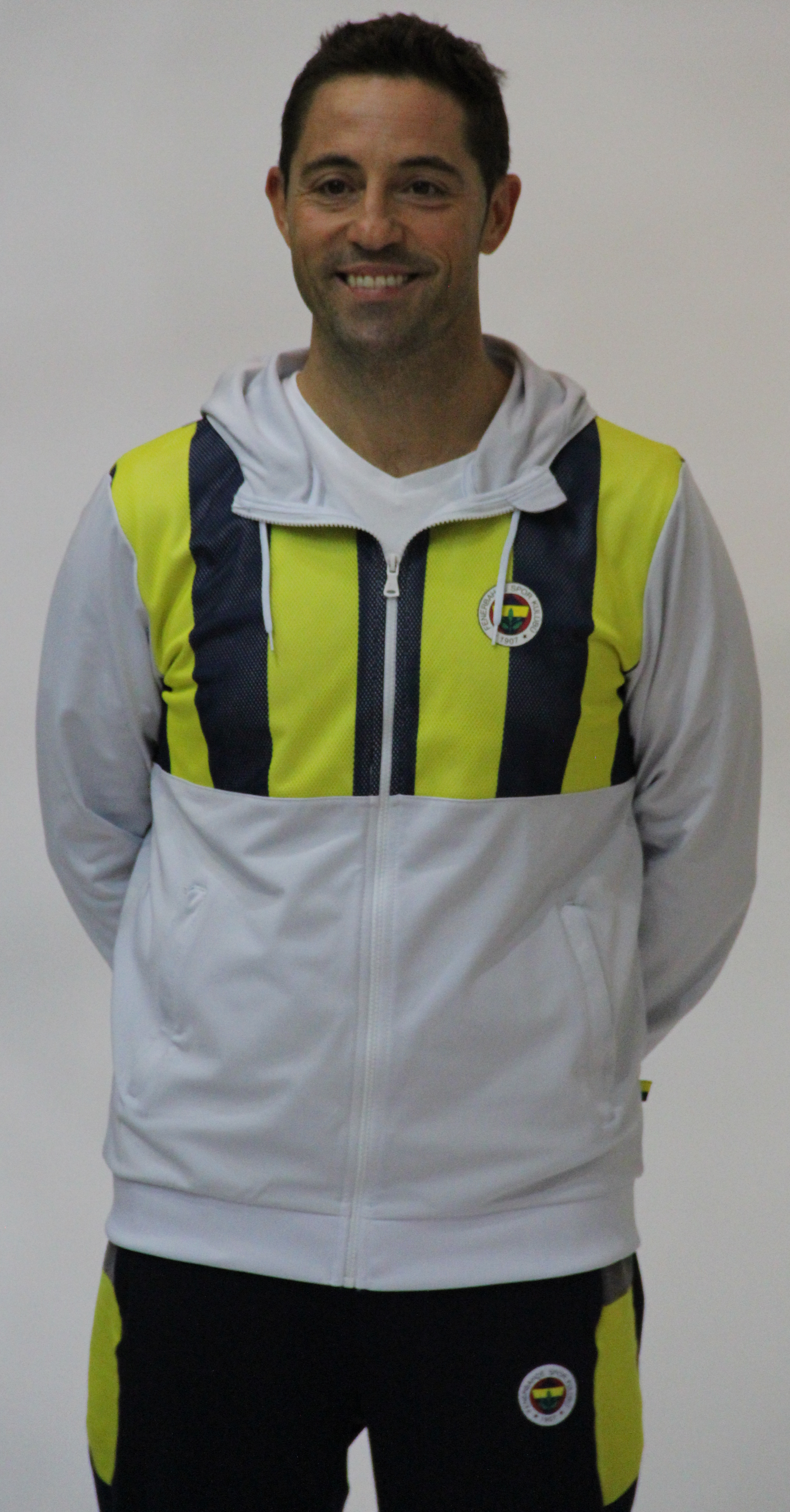

Personal information
- Born: 12 March 1975 (age 51) Zaragoza, Spain
- Position: Head coach
- Coaching career: 2003–present

Career history

Coaching
- 2003–2004: Stadium Casablanca [LF2]
- 2004–2005: Puig d'en Valls [LF2]
- 2005–2007: Extrugasa Cortegada [LF2]
- 2007–2009: Cadí La Seu
- 2009–2012: CDB Zaragoza
- 2012: UNB Obenasa
- 2013–2014: Perfumerías Avenida
- 2015–2018: Stadium Casablanca
- 2018–2019: Nadezhda Orenburg
- 2019–2022: Fenerbahçe
- 2022–2024: Canada women's national team
- 2024–2025: Çukurova Basketbol

Career highlights
- EuroCup Women champion (2019); Spanish League champion (2013); Spanish Cup champion (2014); Turkish Super League champion (2021); Turkish Presidential Cup champion (2019); Turkish Cup champion (2020)

Víctor Antonio Lapeña Tortosa (born 12 March 1975, in Zaragoza) is a Spanish basketball coach.

== Club career ==
He coached several teams in Spain, both in the second tier league (2003-2008) and the first tier league (2008-2018). He won the Spanish League in the 2012-13 season, and the 2014 Spanish Cup with CB Avenida.

In the 2018-2019 season he coached his first team abroad, Nadezhda Orenburg from the Russian Premier League, winning the second-tier 2018–19 EuroCup Women. On 29 June 2019 he signed for Turkish club Fenerbahçe.

In May 2024, Lapeña signed a three-year contract with Çukurova Basketbol of the Turkish Super League . In January 2025 Lapena and Mersin part ways.

In May 2025 the Italian champion Famila basket Schio announced Lapena as their new head coach for the next two years.

== National team ==
=== Spain ===
Lapeña has worked with the Spanish Basketball Federation as both assistant and head coach in the youth teams and the senior team, winning a total of 14 medals. In November 2015 he was the head coach of the senior team for two games.

- 2007 FIBA Europe Under-20 Championship (youth) (assistant coach)
- 2007 Eurobasket (senior) (assistant coach)
- 2009 Eurobasket (senior) (assistant coach)
- 8th 2010 FIBA Under-17 World Championship (youth) (head coach)
- 2011 FIBA Europe Under-16 Championship (youth) (assistant coach)
- 2012 FIBA Under-17 World Championship (youth) (head coach)
- 2013 FIBA Europe Under-18 Championship (youth) (head coach)
- 2013 Eurobasket (senior) (assistant coach)
- 2014 FIBA Under-17 World Championship (youth) (head coach)
- 2014 World Championship (senior) (assistant coach)
- 2015 FIBA Europe Under-18 Championship (youth) (head coach)
- 2015 Eurobasket (senior) (assistant coach)
- 7th 2016 FIBA Under-17 World Championship (youth) (head coach)
- 2016 Summer Olympics (senior) (assistant coach)
- 2017 Eurobasket (senior) (assistant coach)
- 2018 World Championship (senior) (assistant coach)

=== Canada ===
In January 2022, Lapeña was appointed head coach for the Canada women's national basketball team. He guided the team to a fourth-place finish at the 2022 FIBA Women's Basketball World Cup and third place at the 2023 FIBA Women's AmeriCup. Following the 2024 Olympic tournament, where Canada failed to win a game, Canada Basketball and Lapeña mutually agreed to part ways.
