= Sami Hill =

Canadian basketball player

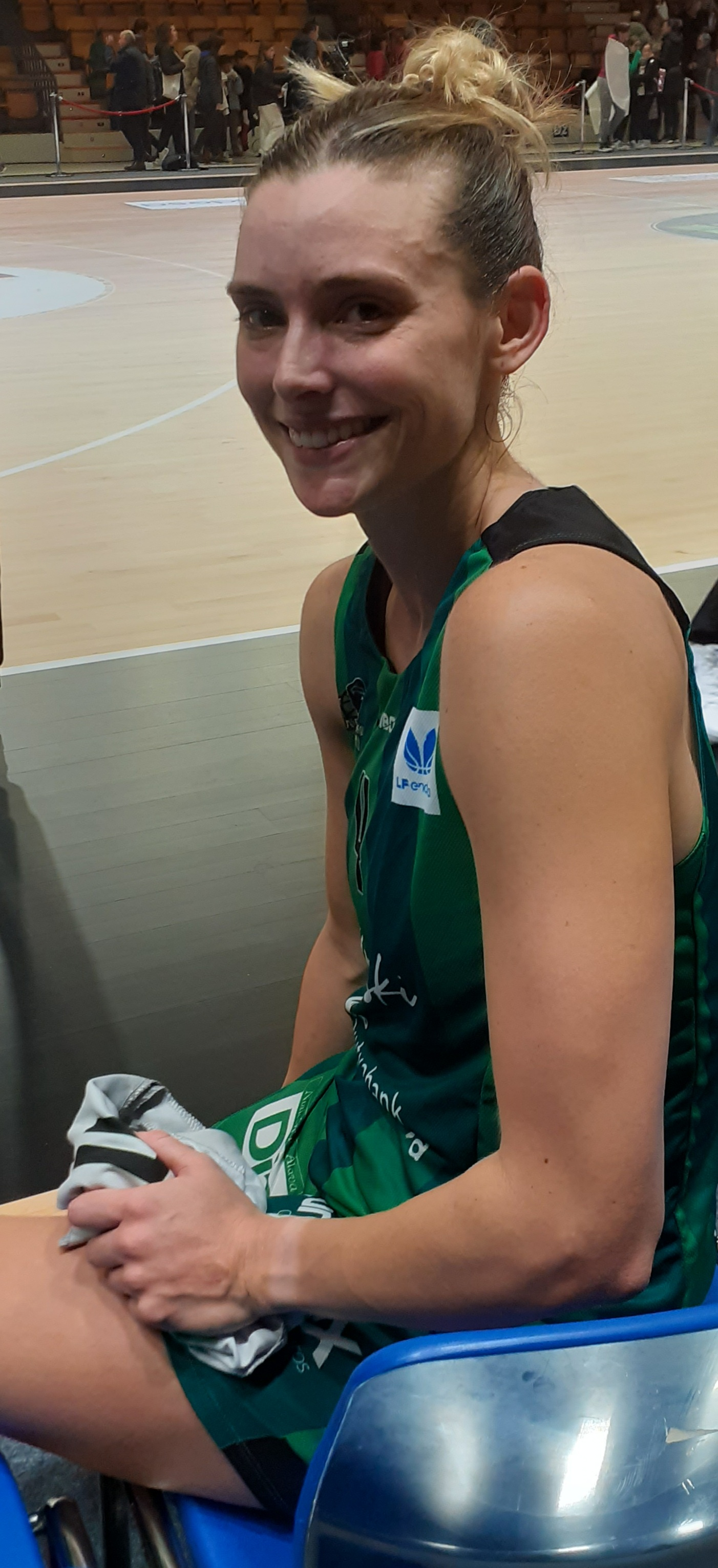
- Hill with Araski in 2023

No. 4 – Araski AES
- Position: Guard

Personal information
- Born: 22 November 1994 (age 31) New York City, New York, U.S.
- Listed height: 177 cm (5 ft 10 in)

Career information
- College: Virginia Tech
- Playing career: 2017–present

Career history
- 2018–2020: Donau-Ries
- 2021–2023: Nantes Rezé Basket
- 2022–2023: Eigner Angels Noerdlingen
- 2023–present: Kutxabank Araski

Career highlights
- All-ACC Academic Team (2017)
Medals
Women's basketball
Representing Canada
FIBA AmeriCup
Gold medal – first place	2017 Argentina
Silver medal – second place	2019 Puerto Rico
Bronze medal – third place	2023 Mexico
Bronze medal – third place	2025 Chile

Samantha "Sami" Hill (born 22 November 1994) is a Canadian basketball player who played college basketball for the Virginia Tech Hokies of the Atlantic Coast Conference (ACC). She represents Canada in international play and was named to the country's roster for the 2024 Summer Olympics.

== Early life ==
Sami Hill was born on 22 November 1994 in New York City, New York. Her hometown is Toronto, Ontario.

== College career ==
Hill was recruited heavily by Kenny Brooks, then the head coach for JMU. However, Hill attended Virginia Tech, where she played for the Hokies from 2013–2017. In her junior year, she helped the Hokies achieve their first winning season in ten years.

During her senior season, Brooks became the Hokies' head coach. That year, Hill was an integral part of the squad, which started the season 15–0. During her senior season, she was named to the All-ACC Academic Team.

== Professional career ==
Following her collegiate career, Hill went pro in 2017. She played for Donau-Ries of the German DBBL from 2018–2020, and later played for Nantes Rezé Basket in France from 2021–2023. She also had a second stint with the German club, which later became known as Eigner Angels Noerdlingen.

In 2023, she signed with the Spanish club Araski AES. Araski's announcement of her signing also stated she had playing experience with the Mexican club Panteras de Aguascalientes. In April 2024, her efforts for Araski earned her Toyota Canada Players of the Week honors. During the corresponding week of April 22–26, she scored 16 points including shooting 10–10 from the free throw line in a win over Jairis. Hill ended her first season with the club as the team's leading scorer, averaging 9.6 points per game in 30 games played. In June, she re-signed with Araski for one year.

== National team career ==
Hill has been a frequent member on Canada's rosters in international competitions. She first played with the junior national team in 2012, having continued to play with the program each summer since. While with the junior team, she won a silver medal at the 2015 Universiade tournament.

Summer of 2016 marked her first with the senior national team. As part of the team's roster at the 2017 FIBA Women's AmeriCup tournament, she won a gold medal. She later won a silver medal with the team at 2019 FIBA Women's AmeriCup. At the 2021 FIBA Women's AmeriCup tournament, Hill averaged 3.2 points, 0.8 rebounds, and 1.8 assists over 6 games as Canada finished in fourth place. For the 2020 Summer Olympics in Tokyo, Hill was an alternate for Canada.

Hill competed with the team at the 2022 FIBA Women's Basketball World Cup, though missed the Qualifying Tournament due to her professional team having to quarantine as a result of COVID-19 issues. Hill helped Canada finish in fourth place at the World Cup. Later, at the 2023 FIBA Women's AmeriCup, Hill averaged 3.9 points, 2.0 rebounds, and 2.4 assists over 7 games. The team won the tournament's bronze medal.

She later helped Canada qualify for the 2024 Summer Olympics in Paris, playing in both Pre-Qualifying Tournament in November 2023, as well as the Qualifying Tournament in February 2024. In May, she was named as one of the 17 players attending the senior national team's training camp roster in preparation for the 2024 Summer Olympics in Paris. In July, Hill was named to Canada's final 12-woman roster and marked her Olympic debut.

== Player profile ==
Made Urieta, Hill's coach at Araski, stated that she is "dangerous in the open field" and noted her defensive qualities, while also stating she is able to play both the one (point) and the two (shooting) positions as a guard.

== Career statistics ==
Legend
GP	Games played	GS	Games started	MPG	Minutes per game
FG%	Field goal percentage	3P%	3-point field goal percentage	FT%	Free throw percentage
RPG	Rebounds per game	APG	Assists per game	SPG	Steals per game
BPG	Blocks per game	PPG	Points per game	**Bold**	Career high

Year	Team	GP	GS	MPG	FG%	3P%	FT%	RPG	APG	SPG	BPG	PPG
2013–14	Virginia Tech	22	0	8.6	.250	.240	.455	.6	.7	.1	.1	1.4
2014–15	Virginia Tech	31	0	16.9	**.349**	**.306**	.657	2.2	.9	.3	.2	3.7
2015–16	Virginia Tech	32	5	17.8	.265	.208	.567	1.5	1.0	.5	.2	2.5
2016–17	Virginia Tech	**34**	**34**	**33.0**	.327	.291	**.823**	**4.4**	**1.5**	**.8**	**.3**	**10.4**
**Career**		119	39	20.2	.316	.277	.721	2.3	1.1	.4	.2	4.9
Statistics retrieved from ESPN.
