= Lauren Ebo =

Nigerian-American basketball player (born 2000)

Joventut Badalona
- Position: Forward / Center
- League: Liga ACB

Personal information
- Born: June 7, 2000 (age 26)
- Listed height: 6 ft 4 in (1.93 m)

Career information
- High school: Paul VI (Chantilly, Virginia); Riverdale Baptist (Upper Marlboro, Maryland)
- College: Penn State (2018–2020); Texas (2020–2022); Notre Dame (2022–2023)

Lauren Ebo (born June 7, 2000) is a Nigerian-American basketball player who competed at the 2024 Summer Olympics for Nigeria.

== Early career ==
Ebo began her high school career at Paul VI Catholic High School in Chantilly, Virginia before transferring to Riverdale Baptist School in Upper Marlboro, Maryland. At Riverdale Baptist, she scored 233 points and had 171 rebounds her senior season.

== College career ==
Ebo began her college career at Penn State, where she remained for two seasons. During the 2018–19 and 2019–20 seasons at Penn State, she appeared in 59 games with a total of 28 starts.

She then transferred to Texas for two seasons. During the 2021–22 season, she averaged 8 points and 6.7 rebounds per game and had 27 blocked shots.

Ebo then transferred to Notre Dame for her final college season. Over the course of the 2022–23 season, Ebo averaged 9 points and 7 rebounds a game in a total of 28 games.

== Professional career ==
In August 2025, Ebo signed with the Spanish club Joventut Badalona.

== International career ==
Ebo played on the Nigerian national team at the 2024 Summer Olympics and helped the team reach the quarterfinals. She was eligible to compete for Nigeria due to her father being a Nigerian citizen.
