= Bridget Carleton =

Canadian basketball player (born 1997)

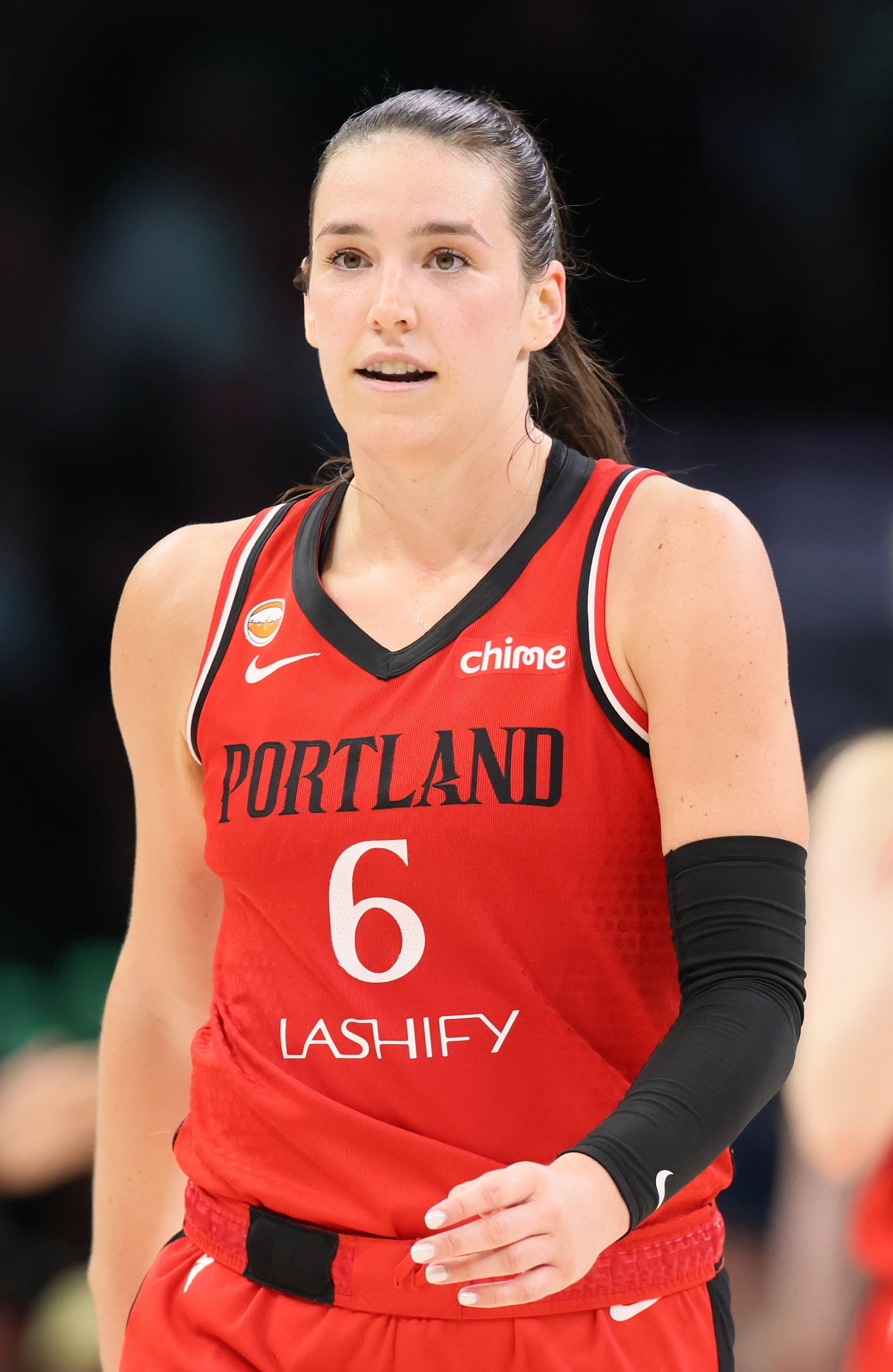
- Carleton with the Portland Fire in 2026

No. 6 – Portland Fire
- Position: Small Forward
- League: WNBA

Personal information
- Born: May 22, 1997 (age 29) Chatham, Ontario, Canada
- Listed height: 6 ft 2 in (1.88 m)
- Listed weight: 190 lb (86 kg)

Career information
- High school: John McGregor (Chatham, Ontario)
- College: Iowa State (2015–2019)
- WNBA draft: 2019: 2nd round, 21st overall pick
- Drafted by: Connecticut Sun
- Playing career: 2019–present

Career history
- 2019: Connecticut Sun
- 2019–2025: Minnesota Lynx
- 2019–2020: Townsville Fire
- 2020: Landerneau
- 2021–2022: Ramat HaSharon
- 2022–2023: CB Avenida
- 2023–2024: SERCO UNI Győr
- 2024–2025: Çukurova Basketbol
- 2025–present: USK Praha
- 2026–present: Portland Fire

Career highlights
- WNBA Commissioner's Cup Champion (2024); Cheryl Miller Award (2019); All-American – WBCA (2019); Second-team All-American – AP (2019); Third-team All-American – USBWA (2019); Big 12 Player of the Year (2019); 3× First-team All-Big 12 (2017–2019); Big 12 All-Freshman Team (2016)
- Stats at Basketball Reference
Medals
Women's basketball
Representing Canada
FIBA AmeriCup
Gold medal – first place	2017 Buenos Aires
Silver medal – second place	2019 Puerto Rico

Bridget Elizabeth Carleton (born May 22, 1997) is a Canadian professional basketball player for the Portland Fire of the Women's National Basketball Association (WNBA), for USK Praha of the Czech Women's Basketball League, and for the Mist of Unrivaled. She played college basketball for the Iowa State Cyclones. Carleton competes internationally with the Canada national team.

== College career ==
On March 14, 2019, Carleton was named second-team All-American by ESPN.

In her career playing at Iowa State University, she finished 2nd in the Cyclones' records for career scoring with 2,142 points. She ranks third in three areas: field goals with 713, steals with 211, and blocked shots with 124.

== Professional career ==
=== WNBA ===
==== Connecticut Sun (2019) ====
Carleton was drafted in the second round of the 2019 WNBA draft, 21st overall, by the Connecticut Sun. She ultimately made the opening day roster, but was later released after just four games.

==== Minnesota Lynx (2019–2025) ====
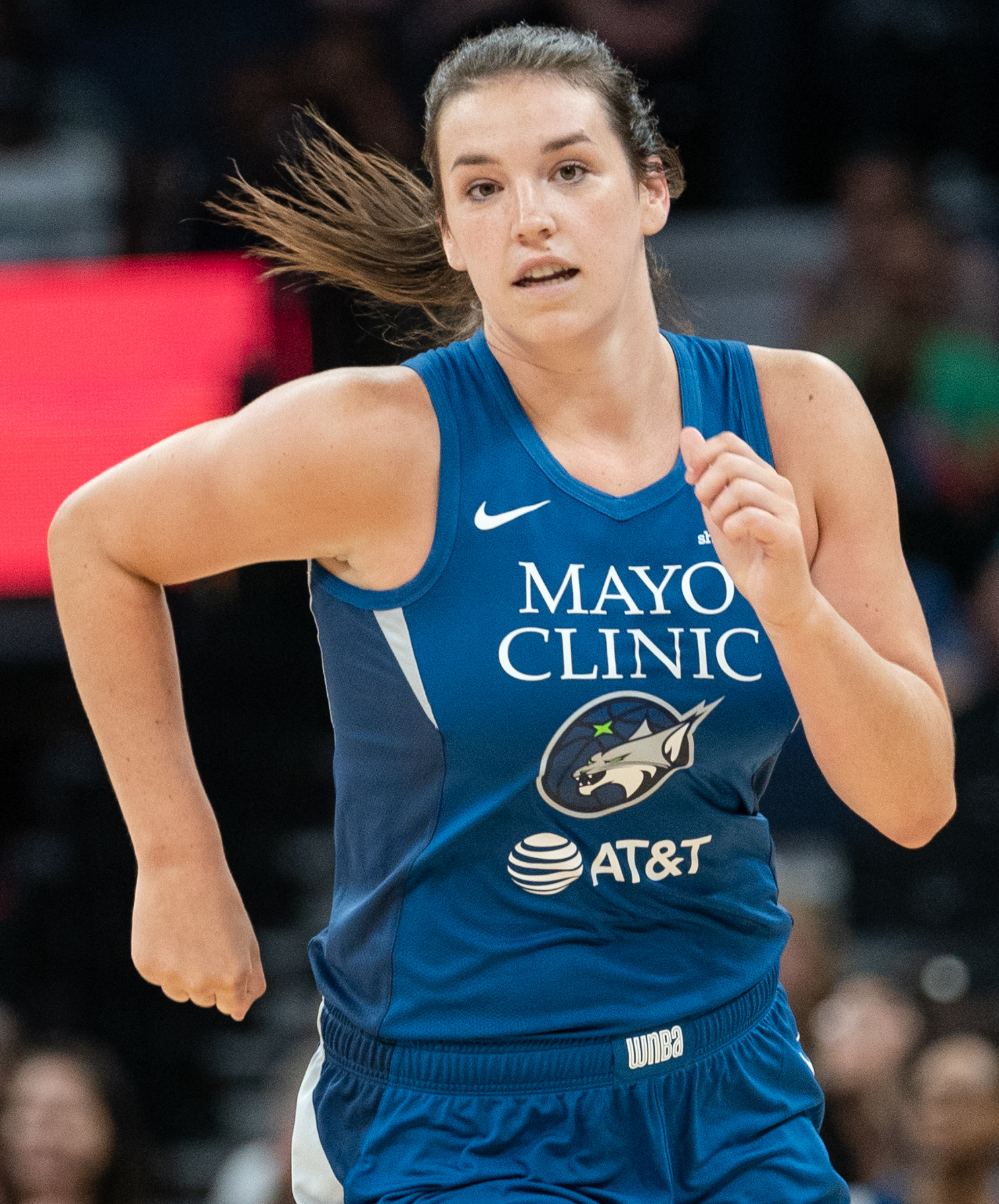
Carleton with the Minnesota Lynx in 2019

On August 22, Carleton signed a 7-day contract with the Minnesota Lynx, followed by a contract for the remainder of the 2019 season.

Carleton made the Lynx roster for the 2020 season, and became a key part of the team – filling in for the injured Sylvia Fowles. Carleton became the third WNBA player in history to score 25 or more points and have more than five rebounds in her first WNBA start in the August 5, 2020, game for the Minnesota Lynx against the New York Liberty. She scored 25 points, had seven rebounds and three assists. Carleton started in place of Sylvia Fowles, who was out with a calf injury.

On May 13, 2023, the Lynx played a preseason game against the Chicago Sky in Toronto, Canada, which was the first WNBA game to be played in Canada. At that game, Carleton was the first Canadian to play a WNBA game in Canada.

The 2024 season was a breakout one for Carleton in which she doubled her playing minutes over 2023 and ranked fifth in the league for her three-point percentage. Head coach Cheryl Reeve said about Carleton in 2024, "This Bridget is the one we've always envisioned." After the Commissioner's Cup win, Napheesa Collier was named the MVP, but after accepting the award, Collier said "I think Bridget deserves this" for Carleton's performance with 23 points, 4 rebounds, 5 assists, and 3 steals in the Cup championship game. Carleton clinched games at key moments for the Lynx in the 2024 season, including a 3-point shot with about 3 seconds left in the September 17, 2024, game against the Connecticut Sun that locked in the win and the second place seed for the Lynx. Carleton won the 2024 Sylvia Fowles Altruism Award for the Lynx. The award winner is chosen by a committee of team staff and players who determine who "best embodies the altruistic traits of kindness, selflessness and overall regard for the well-being of others throughout the community." Minnesota Lynx General Manager Clare Duwelius said about Carleton, "Like Syl did, Bridget leads with kindness, joy, authenticity, and selflessness. Having her leadership in this space has played a huge role in the success we have enjoyed this season, both on and off the court."

==== Portland Fire (2026–present) ====
On April 3, 2026, Carleton was selected 1st overall in the 2026 WNBA expansion draft by the Portland Fire.

=== Overseas ===
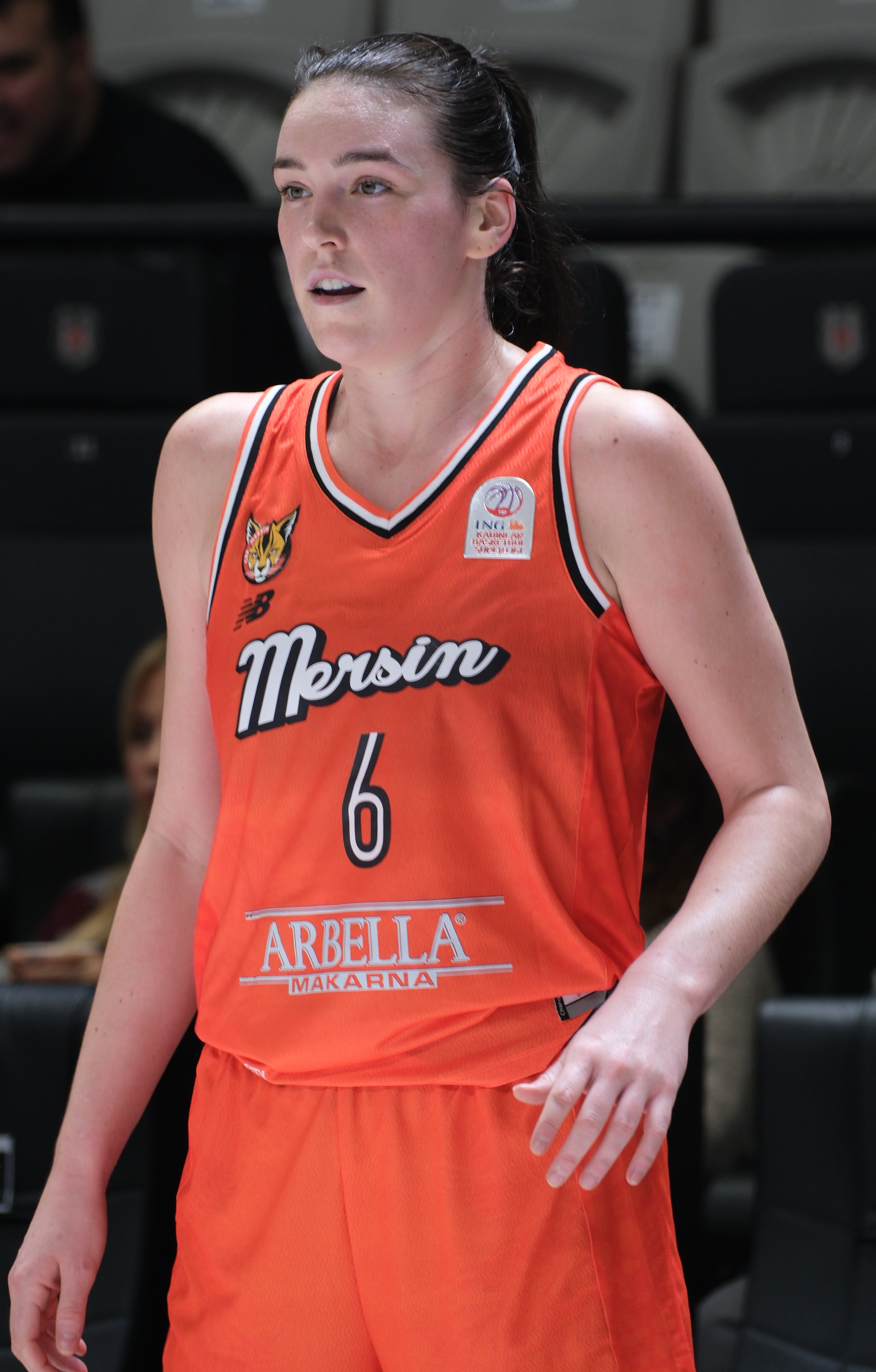
Carleton with Çukurova Basketbol in 2025

In November 2023, Carleton signed with Hungarian team SERCO UNI Győr in the EuroLeague to play in 2023 after the completion of the WNBA season. On January 17, 2024, she recorded 41 points, 6 rebound, and 4 steals against KGHM BC Polkowice. Since the 1996–97 season, it was the third-highest point total behind Lara Mandić in 2002 who dropped 42 and modern day leader Victoria Bullet who scored 48 points for TMC Ahena Cesena in 1996.

Carleton signed to play with Györ again for the 2024–25 season. In December 2024, she signed with Çukurova Basketbol of the Turkish Super League.

Carleton signed with USK Praha of the Czech Women's Basketball League for the 2025–26 season.

== National team career ==
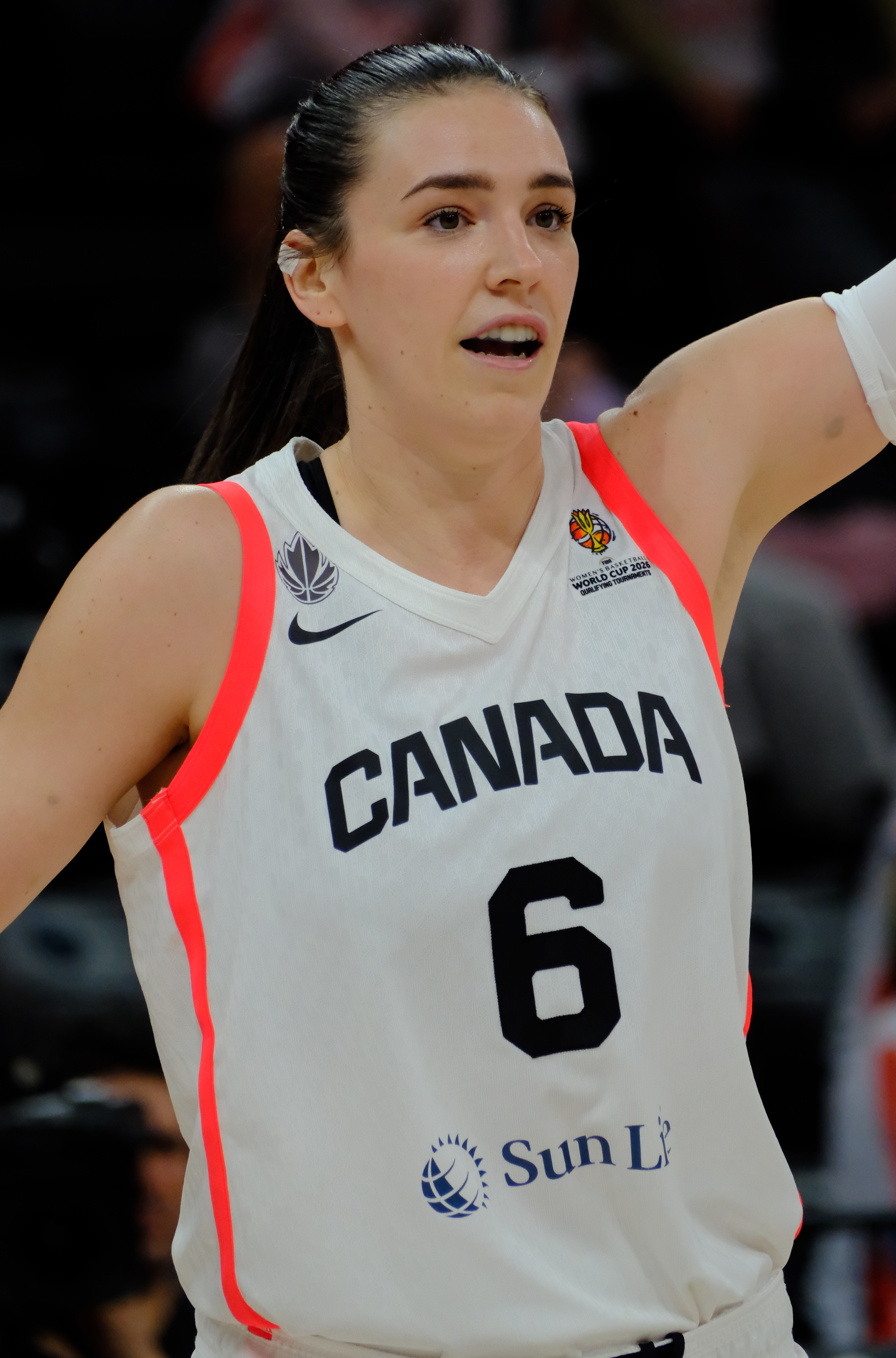
Carleton with the Canadian national team in 2026

Carleton first played for Team Canada at the 2013 U16 FIBA Americas. She was named team captain, led the squad in minutes, and helped Canada to a silver medal. She also was a part of the U17 Ontario Team, which won Gold at the 2013 Canada Games. Carleton also played with the junior team that won silver at the U18 FIBA Americas.

Carleton joined the Senior National Team in 2016 and played in some exhibition games. She was a part of the 2017 squad that defended their gold medal at the 2017 FIBA AmeriCup tournament. In 2018, she helped Canada to a 7th-place finish at the FIBA World Cup, as well in 2019, winning silver at the FIBA AmeriCup.

On June 29, Carleton was named to the 2020 Canadian National Team that competed at the 2020 Olympics.

In February 2024, she played in the Sopron 2024 FIBA Olympic Qualifying Tournament and helped Canada qualify to the 2024 Olympic tournament. She averaged 14 points, 5.7 rebounds and 2 assists per game. Her efficiency per game was 12.

== Career statistics ==
Legend
GP	Games played	GS	Games started	MPG	Minutes per game	RPG	Rebounds per game
APG	Assists per game	SPG	Steals per game	BPG	Blocks per game	PPG	Points per game
TO	Turnovers per game	FG%	Field-goal percentage	3P%	3-point field-goal percentage	FT%	Free-throw percentage
**Bold**	Career best	°	League leader

=== WNBA ===
==== Regular season ====
Stats current through end of 2025 regular season

WNBA regular season statistics
Year	Team	GP	GS	MPG	FG%	3P%	FT%	RPG	APG	SPG	BPG	TO	PPG
2019	Connecticut	4	0	7.3	.000	.000	.000	0.8	0.3	0.0	0.0	0.3	0.0
2019	Minnesota	4	0	2.8	.500	**.500**	—	0.3	0.0	0.0	0.0	**0.0**	0.8
2020	Minnesota	22	15	25.8	**.520**	.457	.647	3.6	**2.5**	0.7	0.0	1.8	6.6
2021	Minnesota	32	10	19.3	.401	.365	**.800**	2.3	1.5	0.8	0.2	0.8	4.8
2022	Minnesota	36	2	16.8	.403	.354	.731	2.1	1.1	0.4	0.1	0.6	4.3
2023	Minnesota	38	4	15.1	.345	.337	.733	2.3	0.9	0.3	0.1	0.4	3.2
2024	Minnesota	39	36	**29.9**	.444	.444	.789	**3.8**	2.2	**1.0**	**0.3**	1.0	**9.6**
2025	Minnesota	**44**	**44**	27.9	.402	.373	.720	3.6	2.0	0.8	**0.3**	0.8	6.5
**Career**	7 years, 2 teams	219	111	21.9	.416	.391	.737	2.9	1.6	0.7	0.2	0.8	5.7

==== Playoffs ====
WNBA playoff statistics
Year	Team	GP	GS	MPG	FG%	3P%	FT%	RPG	APG	SPG	BPG	TO	PPG
2020	Minnesota	4	3	29.5	.500	**.538**	—	**3.8**	**2.5**	**1.3**	0.0	0.8	6.3
2021	Minnesota	1	0	15.0	.000	—	—	0.0	2.0	0.0	0.0	**0.0**	0.0
2023	Minnesota	3	0	24.0	**.600**	.444	.750	3.7	0.7	1.0	0.0	0.3	8.3
2024	Minnesota	**12**°	**12**°	**33.8**	.435	.339	.947	3.8	1.4	0.6	**0.3**	0.9	**9.3**
2025	Minnesota	6	6	28.5	.310	.368	**1.000**	**4.2**	1.5	0.7	**0.3**	0.8	5.0
**Career**	5 years, 1 team	26	21	30.1	.430	.380	.929	3.7	1.5	0.7	0.2	0.8	7.4

=== EuroLeague ===
EuroLeague statistics
Year	Team	GP	MPG	PPG	PTS	RPG	APG	FGM-FGA	FG%	3PM-3PA	3P%	FTM-FTA	FT%
2023-24	SERCO UNI Győr	8	35.8	17	136	6.8	1.6	5.8-13.8	41.8	2.8-6.9	40	2.8-3.5	78.6

=== College ===
NCAA statistics
Year	Team	GP	Points	FG%	3P%	FT%	RPG	APG	SPG	BPG	PPG
2015–16	Iowa State	27	323	33.7%	32.9%	80.5%	6.7	1.7	0.9	0.8	12.0
2016–17	Iowa State	31	465	39.5%	34.1%	**93.9%**	5.7	1.8	1.2	1.0	15.0
2017–18	Iowa State	31	594	38.7%	33.0%	82.5%	6.5	3.4	2.2	0.9	19.2
2018–19	Iowa State	**35**	**760**	**46.8%**	**37.1%**	86.1%	**8.6**	**4.0**	**2.3**	**1.2**	**21.7**
**Career**		124	2142	40.5%	34.3%	85.7%	7.0	2.8	1.7	1.0	17.3
