= Shay Colley =

Canadian basketball player (born 1996)

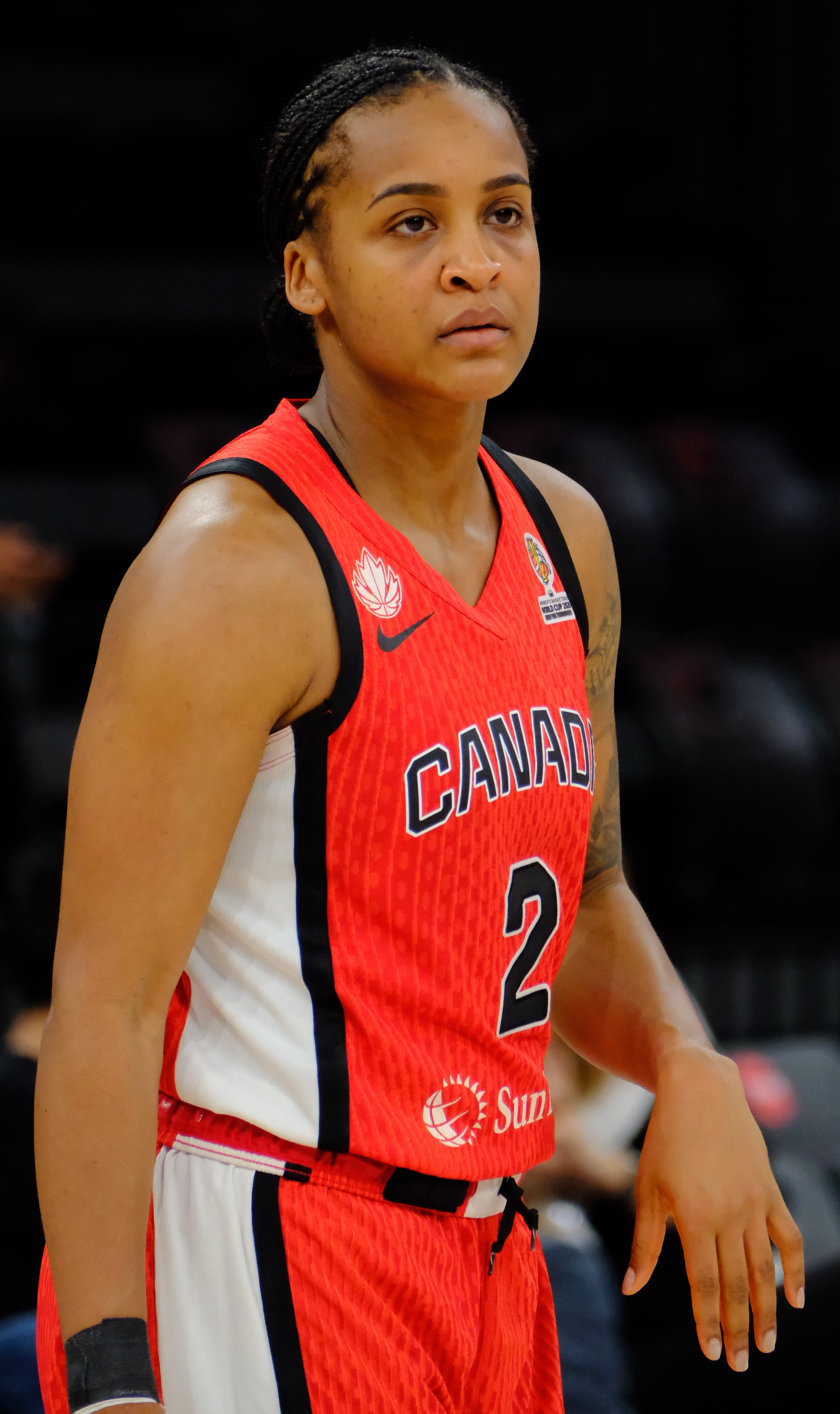

No. 2 – Tango Bourges Basket
- Position: Point guard
- League: LFB

Personal information
- Born: January 6, 1996 (age 30) Halifax, Nova Scotia, Canada
- Listed height: 5 ft 9 in (1.75 m)
- Listed weight: 163 lb (74 kg)

Career information
- High school: St. Edmund Campion Secondary School (Brampton, Ontario)
- College: South Carolina (2015–2016); Michigan State (2017–2020)
- WNBA draft: 2020: undrafted
- Playing career: 2020–present

Career history
- 2021–2022: Uni Gyor
- 2022: A.S.A Jerusalem
- 2022–2024: Flammes Carolo
- 2024–present: Bourges
Medals
Women's basketball
Representing Canada
FIBA AmeriCup
Gold medal – first place	2017 Buenos Aires
Silver medal – second place	2019 Puerto Rico
Bronze medal – third place	2023 León
Bronze medal – third place	2025 Santiago

Shay Colley (born January 6, 1996) is a Canadian professional basketball player for the Tango Bourges Basket of the Ligue Féminine de Basketball (LFB). She played college basketball for the Michigan State Spartans.

== Early life ==
Colley was born in Halifax, Nova Scotia, and went to St. Edmund Campion Secondary School in Brampton, Ontario.

At St. Edmund Campion Secondary School, she led her squad to a pair of regional championships during the 2010 and 2011 seasons. In 2014, she earned a gold medal in the Ontario Federation of School Athletic Association (OFSAA).

== College career ==
Colley began her collegiate career at the University of South Carolina before joining Michigan State University as a redshirt sophomore in 2017.

During her junior year in 2019, she led the team in rebounding and scored the game-winning basket over Central Michigan in the first round of the NCAA tournament.

== Career statistics ==
Legend
GP	Games played	GS	Games started	MPG	Minutes per game
FG%	Field goal percentage	3P%	3-point field goal percentage	FT%	Free throw percentage
RPG	Rebounds per game	APG	Assists per game	SPG	Steals per game
BPG	Blocks per game	PPG	Points per game	**Bold**	Career high

=== College ===
Year	Team	GP	FG%	3P%	FT%	RPG	APG	SPG	BPG	PPG
2015-16	South Carolina	11	35.5%	25.0%	62.5%	1.8	1.2	0.6	0.1	2.7
2016-17	Michigan State	Sat due to NCAA transfer rules								
2017-18	Michigan State	26	**40.7%**	23.5%	76.1%	4.9	**4.4**	**1.9**	0.2	12.4
2018-19	Michigan State	**27**	37.5%	30.7%	**79.4%**	**5.3**	3.5	1.6	**0.3**	**14.1**
2019-20	Michigan State	10	38.7%	**31.3%**	76.9%	3.4	1.3	1.3		8.8
Career		74	38.8%	28.6%	77.3%	4.4	3.2	1.5	0.2	11.1
