= 2025–26 EuroLeague Women Play-ins =

European women's basketball postseason play

The 2026 EuroLeague Women Play-ins, was the postseason portion of the 2025–26 EuroLeague Women basketball competition. They began on 18 February 2026, and ended on 3 March 2026. The top two finishers in the second round qualified for the play-in semifinals, while the teams placed third and fourth battled in the quarterfinals. The play-ins consist of a series played in a best-of-three format. The winners of the semifinal play-ins advanced to the semifinal of the 2026 EuroLeague Women Final Six, while the losers of the semifinal play-ins and the winners of the quarterfinal play-ins qualified for the quarterfinal of the 2026 EuroLeague Women Final Six.

== Qualified teams ==
=== Group E ===
Pos	Team	Pld	W	L	PF	PA	PD	Pts	Qualification
1	(Turkish Basketball Federation) Galatasaray Cagdas Faktoring	12	10	2	901	772	+129	22	Semifinal play-in
2	(Spanish Basketball Federation) Spar Girona	12	8	4	941	819	+122	20 (Note: Spar Girona 158–138 ZVVZ USK Praha)	Semifinal play-in
3	(Czech Basketball Federation) ZVVZ USK Praha	12	8	4	934	820	+114	20	Quarterfinal play-in
4	(Italian Basketball Federation) Beretta Famila Schio	12	7	5	932	887	+45	19	Quarterfinal play-in

Source: EuroLeague Women
Rules for classification: 1) Points; 2) Points difference; 3) Points scored.

=== Group F ===
Pos	Team	Pld	W	L	PF	PA	PD	Pts	Qualification
1	(Turkish Basketball Federation) Fenerbahçe Opet	12	11	1	1011	753	+258	23	Semifinal play-in
2	(French Federation of Basketball) Basket Landes	12	8	4	828	780	+48	20	Semifinal play-in
3	(Italian Basketball Federation) Umana Reyer Venezia	12	7	5	812	858	−46	19 (Note: Umana Reyer Venezia 152–141 Casademont Zaragoza)	Quarterfinal play-in
4	(Spanish Basketball Federation) Casademont Zaragoza	12	7	5	871	815	+56	19	Quarterfinal play-in

Source: EuroLeague Women
Rules for classification: 1) Points; 2) Points difference; 3) Points scored.

== Semifinal play-ins ==
Play in series are best-of-three. The first team to win two games wins the series. A 1–1–1 format is used – teams with home-court advantage played game 1 at home, while their opponents will host game 2. Game 3 will only be played if necessary. The two winning teams advance to the Final Six semifinals, while the losing teams move on to the Final Six quarterfinals.

Team 1	Series	Team 2	Game 1	Game 2	Game 3
Galatasaray Çağdaş Faktoring (Turkey)	2–1	(France) Basket Landes	81–72	70–75	67–51
Fenerbahçe Opet (Turkey)	2–0	(Spain) Spar Girona	87–69	65–58	—

=== Galatasaray Çağdaş Faktoring vs. Basket Landes ===
19 February 2026
20:30 (TRT)

Boxscore

Galatasaray Çağdaş Faktoring (Turkish Basketball Federation)	81–72 (OT)	(French Federation of Basketball) Basket Landes
Scoring by quarter: 14–11, 19–16, 20–7, 13–32, Overtime: 15–6
Pts: Juhász 21; Rebs: Kuier 11; Asts: Johannès 5		Pts: Musa, Lacan 21; Rebs: Musa 11; Asts: Pardon, Droguet 4

Sinan Erdem Dome, Istanbul
Attendance: 1,000
Referees: Péter Praksch (HUN), Nataša Dragojević (MNE), Nemanja Vlahović (SRB)

25 February 2026
19:30 (CET)

Boxscore

Basket Landes (French Federation of Basketball)	75–70	(Turkish Basketball Federation) Galatasaray Çağdaş Faktoring
Scoring by quarter: 22–23, 21–10, 23–16, 9–21
Pts: Musa 20; Rebs: Musa 9 Asts: Pardon, Lacan 5		Pts: Juhász 19; Rebs: Kuier 12; Asts: Oblak 6

Espace François Mitterrand, Mont-de-Marsan
Attendance: 2,600
Referees: Jelena Tomić (CRO), Ivana Ivanović (SRB), Hrvoje Čavar (BIH)

3 March 2026
20:30 (TRT)

Boxscore

Galatasaray Çağdaş Faktoring (Turkish Basketball Federation)	67–51	(French Federation of Basketball) Basket Landes
Scoring by quarter: 18–13, 20–14, 16–8, 13–16
Pts: Kuier 17; Rebs: Smalls 11; Asts: Smalls 5		Pts: Musa 15; Rebs: Musa 8 Asts: Pardon 5

Sinan Erdem Dome, Istanbul
Attendance: 1,104
Referees: Viola Györgyi (NOR), Veronika Obertová (SVK), Alin Faur (ROU)

Galatasaray won the series 2–1

=== Fenerbahçe Opet vs. Spar Girona ===
18 February 2026
20:00 (TRT)

Boxscore

Fenerbahçe Opet (Turkish Basketball Federation)	87–69	(Spanish Basketball Federation) Spar Girona
Scoring by quarter: 19–14, 18–21, 30–20, 20–14
Pts: Rupert 20; Rebs: Allemand 8 Asts: Allemand 11		Pts: Jocytė 13; Rebs: Coulibaly 8 Asts: Holm 3

Ülker Sports and Event Hall, Istanbul
Attendance: 2,500
Referees: Sónia Teixeira (POR), Josip Jurčević (CRO), Siniša Prpa (SRB)

25 February 2026
19:30 (CET)

Boxscore

Spar Girona (Spanish Basketball Federation)	58–65	(Turkish Basketball Federation) Fenerbahçe Opet
Scoring by quarter: 18–20, 14–12, 18–21, 8–12
Pts: Coulibaly 19; Rebs: Coulibaly 9 Asts: Jocytė 5		Pts: Rupert 21; Rebs: Rupert 9 Asts: Meesseman, Allemand 7

Pavelló Fontajau, Girona
Attendance: 3,221
Referees: Nemanja Ninković (SRB), Tomasz Wit Langowski (POL), Diogo Martins (POR)

Fenerbahçe won the series 2–0

== Quarterfinal play-ins ==
Play in series are best-of-three. The first team to win two games wins the series. A 1–1–1 format is used – teams with home-court advantage played game 1 at home, while their opponents will host game 2. Game 3 will only be played if necessary. The two winning teams advance to the Final Six quarterfinals.

Team 1	Series	Team 2	Game 1	Game 2	Game 3
ZVVZ USK Praha (Czech Republic)	0–2	(Spain) Casademont Zaragoza	71–82	66–73	—
Umana Reyer Venezia (Italy)	2–1	(Italy) Beretta Famila Schio	66–68	79–72	62–51

=== ZVVZ USK Praha vs. Casademont Zaragoza ===
18 February 2026
19:00 (CET)

Boxscore

ZVVZ USK Praha (Czech Basketball Federation)	71–82	(Spanish Basketball Federation) Casademont Zaragoza
Scoring by quarter: 17–24, 15–17, 19–17, 20–24
Pts: Cazorla 13; Rebs: Salaün 5 Asts: Astier 7		Pts: Hempe 14; Rebs: Pueyo 7 Asts: Voráčková 7

Královka Arena, Prague
Attendance: 1,210
Referees: Jelena Tomić (CRO), Kirile Tvauri (GEO), Ioannis Agrafiotis (GRE)

25 February 2026
20:00 (CET)

Boxscore

Casademont Zaragoza (Spanish Basketball Federation)	73–66	(Czech Basketball Federation) ZVVZ USK Praha
Scoring by quarter: 23–20, 16–10, 25–16, 9–20
Pts: Hempe 12; Rebs: Gueye 6 Asts: Ortiz, Pueyo 5		Pts: Ayayi 23; Rebs: Ayayi, Hof 6 Asts: Astier 7

Pabellón Príncipe Felipe, Zaragoza
Attendance: 9,215
Referees: Sónia Teixeira (POR), Goran Grbić (SLO), Viktor Nagy (HUN)

Casademont Zaragoza won the series 2–0

=== Umana Reyer Venezia vs. Beretta Famila Schio ===
18 February 2026
19:30 (CET)

Boxscore

Umana Reyer Venezia (Italian Basketball Federation)	66–68	(Italian Basketball Federation) Beretta Famila Schio
Scoring by quarter: 12–15, 23–18, 22–20, 9–15
Pts: Holmes 14; Rebs: Charles 9 Asts: Holmes 5		Pts: Shepard 16; Rebs: Keys, Shepard 7 Asts: Sottana 5

Palasport Taliercio, Venice
Attendance: 2,873
Referees: Mihkel Männi̇ste (EST), Elvis Binders-Coders (LAT), Iain MacDonald (GBR)

25 February 2026
20:00 (CET)

Boxscore

Beretta Famila Schio (Italian Basketball Federation)	72–79	(Italian Basketball Federation) Umana Reyer Venezia
Scoring by quarter: 17–18, 19–18, 17–21, 19–22
Pts: Shepard 19; Rebs: Shepard 14; Asts: Conde 5		Pts: Holmes 19; Rebs: Charles, Cubaj 8 Asts: Cubaj, Villa 4

Palazzetto Livio Romare, Schio
Attendance: 2,358
Referees: Ciprian Stoica (ROU), Roko Hordov (CRO), Emmanouil Tsolakos (GRE)

3 March 2026
19:30 (CET)

Boxscore

Umana Reyer Venezia (Italian Basketball Federation)	62–51	(Italian Basketball Federation) Beretta Famila Schio
Scoring by quarter: 14–10, 18–16, 15–19, 15–6
Pts: Dojkić 15; Rebs: Cubaj 10; Asts: Santucci 8		Pts: Shepard 16; Rebs: Shepard 13; Asts: Conde 4

Palasport Taliercio, Venice
Attendance: 3,506
Referees: Nataša Dragojević (MNE), Armin Mutapčić (GER), Branimir Galić (CRO)

Umana Reyer Venezia Zaragoza won the series 2–1

== Matchday reports ==
Reference
Game 1
Game 2
Game 3
