= 2025–26 EuroLeague Women =

EuroLeague Women
- Season: 2025–26
- Dates: Qualifying: 17–24 September 2025; Regular season: 8 October 2025 – 4 February 2026; Play-Ins: 18 February – 3 March 2026; Final Six: 15–19 April 2026
- Teams: Competition proper: 16; Total: 21 (from 11 countries)

Regular season
- Season MVP: (Hungary) Dorka Juhász

Finals
- Champions: (Turkish Basketball Federation) Fenerbahçe Opet (3rd title)
- Runners-up: (Turkish Basketball Federation) Galatasaray Çağdaş Faktoring
- Third place: (Spanish Basketball Federation) Casademont Zaragoza
- Fourth place: (Spanish Basketball Federation) Spar Girona
- Final Four MVP: (Belgium) Julie Allemand

Statistical leaders
Points	(Slovenia) Jessica Shepard	17.0
Rebounds	(Slovenia) Jessica Shepard	9.5
Assists	(Belgium) Julie Allemand	7.6
Steals	(France) Gabby Williams	3.0
Blocks	(Finland) Awak Kuier	1.6
Efficiency	(Slovenia) Jessica Shepard	21.5

Records
- Biggest home win: Galatasaray 104–54 Sopron Basket (26 November 2025)
- Biggest away win: Olympiacos 47–99 Fenerbahçe (26 November 2025)
- Highest scoring: Fenerbahçe 113–65 DVTK (29 October 2025)
- Lowest scoring: Umana Reyer Venezia 57–56 Basket Landes (26 November 2025)
- Winning streak: 8 games Fenerbahçe
- Losing streak: 6 games VBW Gdynia; Sopron Basket
- Highest attendance: 10,828 officially three matches
- Lowest attendance: 200 officially four matches

The 2025–26 EuroLeague Women was the 68th edition of the premier European women's club basketball championship organized by FIBA, and the 29th edition since being rebranded from the FIBA Women's European Champions Cup to the EuroLeague Women. The season began on 18 September 2025 and ended on 19 April 2026 with the Final Six.

This edition was the second straight season under the new format.

The winners of the EuroLeague Women automatically qualify for next season's edition and also qualify for the 2026 SuperCup.

ZVVZ USK Praha are the defending champions, having won their second title last season.

== Format ==
- Regular season (First round)

After the qualifiers, 16 teams will be split into 4 groups of four, where the top three from each group advances to the second round. The fourth place teams drop down to the EuroCup Women knockout stage. The advancing teams' records from the first round are carried over into the next round.

- Regular season (Second round)

The 12 remaining teams form 2 groups of six and will play the teams they have not played in the first round. In both groups, the top 2 will play the Semi-Final play-ins while 3rd and 4th play the Quarter-Final play-ins. The teams who finish fifth and sixth are eliminated.

- Play-ins

The play-ins will decide who makes the final six and where each team will start in the final six. The top 2 play the Semi-Final play-ins and the third and fourth teams play the Quarter-Final play-ins. Unlike last season, the play-ins are played as a best of three series, rather than a home and away aggregate format. The higher-seeded teams play the second leg at home.

The winners of the Semi-Final play-ins will automatically progress to the semifinals of the final six, while the victors of the Quarter-Final play-ins will reach the quarterfinals of the final six. The losers of the Quarter-Final play-ins are eliminated.

- Final Six

The final six is held in a centralised venue and decide the champion. The losers of the Semi-Final play-ins plus the winners of the Quarter-Final play-ins contest the quarterfinals. The two winners move on to the semifinals to play the teams who automatically qualify for this round. Whoever triumphs in the semifinals reach the final while the losers play the third place match.

== Rankings ==
The results were based on the results of the past three seasons.

- Associations 1–4 can have three teams qualify.
- Associations 5–8 each have two teams qualify.
- Associations 9–10 each have one team qualify directly into the regular season.
- Associations below the top 10 can have one team qualify for the qualification round.

If a club who qualified for the regular season doesn't take the place, it will be given to another club who entered.

Rank	Association	Average points	Teams
1	(Turkish Basketball Federation) Turkey	262.00	3
2	(French Federation of Basketball) France	184.67	3
3	(Spanish Basketball Federation) Spain	176.33	3
4	(Italian Basketball Federation) Italy	115.33	2
5	(Czech Basketball Federation) Czech Republic	110.67	2
6	(Hungarian Basketball Federation) Hungary	81.33	2
7	(Polish Basketball Federation) Poland	51.33	2
8	(Basketball Belgium) Belgium	26.00	0
9	(Hellenic Basketball Federation) Greece	21.33	1
10	(Israeli Basketball Association) Israel	20.00	0
10	(British Basketball) Great Britain	20.00	0
12	(Romanian Basketball Federation) Romania	18.00	1
13	(Lithuanian Basketball Federation) Lithuania	11.33	1

Rank	Association	Average points	Teams
14	(Portuguese Basketball Federation) Portugal	10.67	0
15	(Slovak Basketball Association) Slovakia	10.00	0
15	(German Basketball Federation) Germany	10.00	0
17	(Latvian Basketball Association) Latvia	8.00	0
18	(Swiss Basketball) Switzerland	7.33	0
19	(Basketball Federation of Serbia) Serbia	6.00	1
20	(Luxembourg Basketball Federation) Luxembourg	5.33	0
21	(Croatian Basketball Federation) Croatia	3.33	0
22	(Basketball Finland) Finland	1.33	0
22	(Basketball Federation of Armenia) Armenia	1.33	0
22	(Cyprus Basketball Federation) Cyprus	1.33	0
22	(Bulgarian Basketball Federation) Bulgaria	1.33	0

== Teams ==
The labels in the parentheses show how each team qualified for the place of its starting round:

- TH EL: EuroLeague Women title holders
- TH EC: EuroCup Women title holders
- 1st, 2nd, 3rd etc.: League position of the previous season
- RS: Regular season winners
- CW: Cup winners
- CR: Cup runners-up

Also, S means that the team in the qualifying round was seeded.

The teams were announced on 6 July 2025, with a total of 21 clubs registering for the competition. Starting this season, the host team of the Final Six are allowed to enter the qualifiers if they had they not qualified on merit (however, this spot wasn't taken as Casademont Zaragoza qualified via their domestic league). Another rule change is that the EuroLeague Women title holders can take part regardless of their domestic league result.

Regular season
(Turkey) Fenerbahçe Opet (1st)	(Turkey) ÇIMSA CBK Mersin (2nd)
(France) Basket Landes (1st)	(France) Flammes Carolo Basket (4th, CW)
(Spain) Valencia Basket (1st)	(Spain) Spar Girona (3rd, RS)
(Italy) Beretta Famila Schio (1st)	(Czech Republic) ZVVZ USK Praha ^{TH EL} (1st)
(Hungary) Sopron Basket (1st)	(Poland) VBW Gdynia (1st)
(Greece) Olympiacos SFP (1st)
Qualifying round
(Turkey) Galatasaray Cagdas Faktoring ^{S} (3rd)	(France) Tango Bourges Basket ^{S} (5th, RS)
(Spain) Casademont Zaragoza ^{S} (2nd)	(Italy) Umana Reyer Venezia ^{S} (2nd)
(Hungary) DVTK HUN-Therm ^{S} (2nd)	(Czech Republic) Žabiny Brno (2nd)
(Poland) AZS UMCS Lublin (5th)	(Romania) ACS Sepsi SIC (1st)
(Lithuania) Kibirkštis-TOKS (1st)	(Serbia) KKZ Crvena zvezda (1st)

=== Name changes ===
The following teams' names were changed during the season.

Original name	New name	Matchday
(Lithuania) Kibirkštis	(Lithuania) Kibirkštis-TOKS	First leg of qualifiers

== Round and draw dates ==
=== Schedule ===
Phase	Draw date	Round	Round date
Qualification round	28 July 2025	First Leg	17 September 2025
Qualification round	28 July 2025	Second Leg	24 September 2025
Regular season (First Round)	28 July 2025	Matchday 1	8 October 2025
Regular season (First Round)	28 July 2025	Matchday 2	15 October 2025
Regular season (First Round)	28 July 2025	Matchday 3	22 October 2025
Regular season (First Round)	28 July 2025	Matchday 4	29 October 2025
Regular season (First Round)	28 July 2025	Matchday 5	4 November 2025
Regular season (First Round)	28 July 2025	Matchday 6	26 November 2025
Regular season (Second Round)	28 July 2025	Matchday 7	10 December 2025
Regular season (Second Round)	28 July 2025	Matchday 8	17 December 2025
Regular season (Second Round)	28 July 2025	Matchday 9	14 January 2026
Regular season (Second Round)	28 July 2025	Matchday 10	21 January 2026
Regular season (Second Round)	28 July 2025	Matchday 11	28 January 2026
Regular season (Second Round)	28 July 2025	Matchday 12	4 February 2026
Play-Ins	28 July 2025	Game 1	18 February 2026
Play-Ins	28 July 2025	Game 2	25 February 2026
Play-Ins	28 July 2025	Game 3	3 March 2026
Final Six	28 July 2025	Quarterfinals	15 April 2026
Final Six	28 July 2025	Semifinals	17 April 2026
Final Six	28 July 2025	Final	19 April 2026

=== Draw ===
The seeding was announced on 16 July 2025. The draw took place in Munich, Germany, on 23 July 2025. Only a maximum of one club from the same country can be in the same regular season group.

Seed 1	Seed 2	Seed 3	Seed 4
(Turkey) Fenerbahçe Opet (Czech Republic) ZVVZ USK Praha (Turkey) ÇİMSA ÇBK Mersin (Italy) Beretta Famila Schio	(Spain) Valencia Basket (Spain) Spar Girona (France) Basket Landes (Hungary) Sopron Basket	(Greece) Olympiacos SFP (Poland) VBW Gdynia (France) Flammes Carolo Basket (N/A) Qualifier 1 (Note: The eventual team in this slot was Casademont Zaragoza.)	(N/A) Qualifier 2 (Note: The eventual team in this slot was Umana Reyer Venezia.) (N/A) Qualifier 3 (Note: The eventual team in this slot was Galatasaray Çağdaş Faktoring.) (N/A) Qualifier 4 (Note: The eventual team in this slot was DVTK HUN-Therm.) (N/A) Qualifier 5 (Note: The eventual team in this slot was Tango Bourges Basket.)

== Qualification round ==
The draw for the qualification round was conducted on 23 July 2025. The winners advance to the regular season, while the losers drop down to the EuroCup regular season.

Team 1	Agg.	Team 2	1st leg	2nd leg
Casademont Zaragoza (Spain)	142–140	(Czech Republic) Žabiny Brno	60–81	82–59
Umana Reyer Venezia (Italy)	149–134	(Serbia) KKZ Crvena zvezda	79–71	70–63
Galatasaray Cagdas Faktoring (Turkey)	164–94	(Romania) ACS Sepsi SIC	81–48	86–46
DVTK HUN-Therm (Hungary)	144–129	(Poland) AZS UMCS Lublin	67–70	77–59
Tango Bourges Basket (France)	153–134	(Lithuania) Kibirkštis-TOKS	64–75	89–59

== Regular season ==
Location of teams of the 2025–26 Euroleague Women regular season.
Red: Group A; Green: Group B; Yellow: Group C; Blue: Group D.

If teams are level on record at the end of the regular season, tiebreakers are applied in the following order:

1. Head-to-head record
2. Head-to-head point differential
3. Head-to-head points scored
4. Point differential for the entire regular season
5. Points scored for the entire regular season

Overall, eight countries are present in the regular season, with no difference with the countries taking part. Flammes Carolo Basket make their return for the first time since 2019–20. Galatasaray Cagdas Factoring and Gdynia VBW return for the first time since 2021–22, Sopron Basket and Spar Girona come back after three years.

=== First round ===
==== Group A ====
Pos	Team	Pld	W	L	PF	PA	PD	Pts	Qualification	GIR	TAN	PRA	ARK
1	(Spanish Basketball Federation) Spar Girona	6	5	1	489	387	+102	11	Second round	—	92–62	83–78	86–53
2	(French Federation of Basketball) Tango Bourges Basket	6	4	2	421	394	+27	10	Second round	69–63	—	57–77	83–62
3	(Czech Basketball Federation) ZVVZ USK Praha	6	3	3	457	411	+46	9	Second round	60–75	43–78	—	102–67
4	(Polish Basketball Federation) VBW Gdynia	6	0	6	355	530	−175	6	EuroCup Women	65–90	57–72	51–97	—

Source: EuroLeague Women
Legend: Blue = home team win; Red = away team win.
Rules for classification: 1) Points; 2) Points difference; 3) Points scored.

==== Group B ====
Pos	Team	Pld	W	L	PF	PA	PD	Pts	Qualification	GAL	SCH	FLA	SOP
1	(Turkish Basketball Federation) Galatasaray Cagdas Faktoring	6	6	0	471	378	+93	12	Second round	—	73–70	77–73	104–54
2	(Italian Basketball Federation) Beretta Famila Schio	6	4	2	452	415	+37	10	Second round	61–72	—	74–57	82–65
3	(French Federation of Basketball) Flammes Carolo Basket	6	2	4	419	410	+9	8	Second round	56–62	79–81	—	72–62
4	(Hungarian Basketball Federation) Sopron Basket	6	0	6	368	507	−139	6	EuroCup Women	64–83	69–84	54–82	—

Source: EuroLeague Women
Legend: Blue = home team win; Red = away team win.
Rules for classification: 1) Points; 2) Points difference; 3) Points scored.

==== Group C ====
Pos	Team	Pld	W	L	PF	PA	PD	Pts	Qualification	FEN	VAL	DVTK	OLY
1	(Turkish Basketball Federation) Fenerbahçe Opet	6	6	0	541	364	+177	12	Second round	—	71–49	113–65	94–73
2	(Spanish Basketball Federation) Valencia Basket	6	4	2	497	399	+98	10	Second round	72–75	—	81–58	99–57
3	(Hungarian Basketball Federation) DVTK HUN-Therm	6	1	5	389	514	−125	7 (Note: DVTK HUN-Therm 144–132 Olympiacos SFP)	Second round	58–89	64–99	—	87–63
4	(Hellenic Basketball Federation) Olympiacos SFP	6	1	5	383	533	−150	7	EuroCup Women	47–99	74–97	69–57	—

Source: EuroLeague Women
Legend: Blue = home team win; Red = away team win.
Rules for classification: 1) Points; 2) Points difference; 3) Points scored.

==== Group D ====
Pos	Team	Pld	W	L	PF	PA	PD	Pts	Qualification	LAN	REY	CAS	MER
1	(French Federation of Basketball) Basket Landes	6	4	2	390	374	+16	10	Second round	—	63–57	70–73	66–55
2	(Italian Basketball Federation) Umana Reyer Venezia	6	4	2	407	405	+2	10	Second round	57–56	—	68–61	72–62
3	(Spanish Basketball Federation) Casademont Zaragoza	6	3	3	444	417	+27	9	Second round	63–65	80–84	—	88–58
4	(Turkish Basketball Federation) ÇIMSA CBK Mersin	6	1	5	399	444	−45	7	EuroCup Women	69–70	83–69	72–79	—

Source: EuroLeague Women
Legend: Blue = home team win; Red = away team win.
Rules for classification: 1) Points; 2) Points difference; 3) Points scored.

=== Second round ===
==== Group E ====
Pos	Team	Pld	W	L	PF	PA	PD	Pts	Qualification	GAL	GIR	PRA	SCH	TAN	FLA
1	(Turkish Basketball Federation) Galatasaray Cagdas Faktoring	12	10	2	901	772	+129	22	Semifinal play-in	—	67–57	64–71	73–70	80–62	77–73
2	(Spanish Basketball Federation) Spar Girona	12	8	4	941	819	+122	20 (Note: Spar Girona 158–138 ZVVZ USK Praha)	Semifinal play-in	68–82	—	83–78	81–72	92–62	89–58
3	(Czech Basketball Federation) ZVVZ USK Praha	12	8	4	934	820	+114	20	Quarterfinal play-in	64–55	60–75	—	78–66	43–78	98–55
4	(Italian Basketball Federation) Beretta Famila Schio	12	7	5	932	887	+45	19	Quarterfinal play-in	61–72	85–74	99–78	—	77–69	74–57
5	(French Federation of Basketball) Tango Bourges Basket	12	6	6	860	836	+24	18		72–82	69–63	57–77	92–81	—	85–57
6	(French Federation of Basketball) Flammes Carolo Basket	12	3	9	792	912	−120	15		56–62	68–83	70–88	79–81	65–59	—

Source: EuroLeague Women
Legend: Blue = home team win; Red = away team win.
Rules for classification: 1) Points; 2) Points difference; 3) Points scored.

==== Group F ====
Pos	Team	Pld	W	L	PF	PA	PD	Pts	Qualification	FEN	LAN	REY	CAS	VAL	DVTK
1	(Turkish Basketball Federation) Fenerbahçe Opet	12	11	1	1011	753	+258	23	Semifinal play-in	—	78–69	96–48	69–67	71–49	113–65
2	(French Federation of Basketball) Basket Landes	12	8	4	828	780	+48	20	Semifinal play-in	80–61	—	63–57	70–73	57–66	79–59
3	(Italian Basketball Federation) Umana Reyer Venezia	12	7	5	812	858	−46	19 (Note: Umana Reyer Venezia 152–141 Casademont Zaragoza)	Quarterfinal play-in	61–71	57–56	—	68–61	69–55	83–81
4	(Spanish Basketball Federation) Casademont Zaragoza	12	7	5	871	815	+56	19	Quarterfinal play-in	64–95	63–65	80–84	—	81–71	66–40
5	(Spanish Basketball Federation) Valencia Basket	12	6	6	905	825	+80	18		72–75	72–76	81–73	63–70	—	81–58
6	(Hungarian Basketball Federation) DVTK HUN-Therm	12	1	11	768	969	−201	13		58–89	70–77	69–71	60–79	64–99	—

Source: EuroLeague Women
Legend: Blue = home team win; Red = away team win.
Rules for classification: 1) Points; 2) Points difference; 3) Points scored.

== Play-ins ==
=== Semifinal play-ins ===
Team 1	Series	Team 2	Game 1	Game 2	Game 3
Galatasaray Çağdaş Faktoring (Turkey)	2–1	(France) Basket Landes	81–72	70–75	67–51
Fenerbahçe Opet (Turkey)	2–0	(Spain) Spar Girona	87–69	65–58	—

=== Quarterfinal play-ins ===
Team 1	Series	Team 2	Game 1	Game 2	Game 3
ZVVZ USK Praha (Czech Republic)	0–2	(Spain) Casademont Zaragoza	71–82	66–73	—
Umana Reyer Venezia (Italy)	2–1	(Italy) Beretta Famila Schio	66–68	79–72	62–51

== Final six ==
On 2 December 2024, the Pabellón Príncipe Felipe in Zaragoza was announced as the host of the final six for the next three years, starting from 2025.

=== Bracket ===
Quarterfinals
15 April
(France) Basket Landes	53
(Spanish Basketball Federation) Casademont Zaragoza	69
15 April
(Spain) Spar Girona	70
(Italy) Umana Reyer Venezia	64

Semifinals
17 April
(Turkey) Galatasaray Çağdaş Faktoring	63
(Spanish Basketball Federation) Casademont Zaragoza	56
17 April
(Turkey) Fenerbahçe Opet	76
(Spain) Spar Girona	59

Final
19 April
(Turkey) Galatasaray Çağdaş Faktoring	55
(Turkey) Fenerbahçe Opet	68
Third place
19 April
(Spanish Basketball Federation) Casademont Zaragoza	66
(Spain) Spar Girona	63

2025–26 EuroLeague Women Champions

Fenerbahçe Opet
Third title

== Awards ==
=== EuroLeague MVP ===
Player	Team	Ref.
(Hungary) Dorka Juhász	(Turkey) Galatasaray	

=== EuroLeague Final Six MVP ===
Player	Team	Ref.
(Belgium) Julie Allemand	(Turkey) Fenerbahçe Opet	

=== All-EuroLeague Teams ===
First Team	Second Team	Third Team
(Belgium) Julie Allemand	(Spain) Mariona Ortiz	(Lithuania) Justė Jocytė
(France) Leïla Lacan	(France) Gabby Williams	(United States) Kayla McBride
(Belgium) Emma Meesseman	(Nigeria) Murjanatu Musa	(Spain) Helena Pueyo
(France) Iliana Rupert	(Mali) Mariam Coulibaly	(United States) Kaila Charles
(Hungary) Dorka Juhász	(Slovenia) Jessica Shepard	(Finland) Awak Kuier

=== Defensive Player of the Year ===
Player	Team	Ref.
(France) Gabby Williams	(Turkey) Fenerbahçe Opet	

=== Young Player of the Year ===
Player	Team	Ref.
(France) Leïla Lacan	(France) Basket Landes	

=== Coach of the Year ===
Coach	Team	Ref.
(France) Julie Barennes	(France) Basket Landes	

=== Best Play of the Season ===
Player	Team	Ref.
(France) Marine Johannès	(Turkey) Galatasaray Çağdaş Faktoring	

=== Legacy Award ===
Player	Ref.
(Belgium) Ann Wauters	

=== Club Excellence Award ===
Team	Ref.
(Turkey) Fenerbahçe Opet	

=== MVP of the Month ===
Month	Player	Team	Ref.
October	(France) Iliana Rupert	(Turkey) Fenerbahçe Opet	
November	(Belgium) Julie Allemand	(Turkey) Fenerbahçe Opet	
December	(Mali) Mariam Coulibaly	(Spain) Spar Girona	
January	(France) Leïla Lacan	(France) Basket Landes	
February	(Hungary) Dorka Juhász	(Turkey) Galatasaray Çağdaş Faktoring	

=== Team of the Month ===
Month	PG	SG	SF	PF	C	Ref.
October	(Belgium) Julie Allemand ( (Turkey) Fenerbahçe Opet)	(Sweden) Klara Holm ( (Spain) Spar Girona)	(United States) Kamiah Smalls ( (Turkey) Galatasaray Çağdaş Faktoring)	(France) Iliana Rupert ( (Turkey) Fenerbahçe Opet)	(Canada) Kayla Alexander ( (Spain) Valencia Basket)	
November	(Belgium) Julie Allemand ( (Turkey) Fenerbahçe Opet)	(France) Alix Duchet ( (France) Tango Bourges Basket)	(Hungary) Dorka Juhász ( (Turkey) Galatasaray Çağdaş Faktoring)	(Canada) Kayla Alexander ( (Spain) Valencia Basket)	(Slovenia) Jessica Shepard ( (Italy) Beretta Famila Schio)	
December	(France) Tima Pouye ( (France) Tango Bourges Basket)	(Lithuania) Justė Jocytė ( (Spain) Spar Girona)	(Slovenia) Jessica Shepard ( (Italy) Beretta Famila Schio)	(Spain) Megan Gustafson ( (Turkey) Fenerbahçe Opet)	(Mali) Mariam Coulibaly ( (Spain) Spar Girona)	
January	(France) Leïla Lacan ( (France) Basket Landes)	(Canada) Bridget Carleton ( (Czech Republic) ZVVZ USK Praha)	(Belgium) Emma Meesseman ( (Turkey) Fenerbahçe Opet)	(Nigeria) Murjanatu Musa ( (France) Basket Landes)	(Slovenia) Jessica Shepard ( (Italy) Beretta Famila Schio)	
February	(Spain) Mariona Ortiz ( (Spain) Casademont Zaragoza)	(Belgium) Julie Allemand ( (Turkey) Fenerbahçe Opet)	(Belgium) Emma Meesseman ( (Turkey) Fenerbahçe Opet)	(Hungary) Dorka Juhász ( (Turkey) Galatasaray Çağdaş Faktoring)	(Nigeria) Murjanatu Musa ( (France) Basket Landes)	

=== MVP of the Round ===
First round

Round	PG	SG	SF	PF	C	Ref.
1	(Sweden) Klara Holm ( (Spain) Spar Girona)	(Belgium) Hind Ben Abdelkader ( (Spain) Valencia Basket)	(Greece) Eleanna Christinaki ( (Greece) Olympiacos SFP)	(Spain) Helena Pueyo ( (Spain) Casademont Zaragoza)	(Canada) Kayla Alexander ( (Spain) Valencia Basket)	
2	(France) Tima Pouye ( (France) Tango Bourges Basket)	(Slovenia) Zala Friškovec ( (Hungary) Sopron Basket)	(Greece) Eleanna Christinaki ( (Greece) Olympiacos SFP)	(United States) Joyner Holmes ( (Italy) Umana Reyer Venezia)	(France) Iliana Rupert ( (Turkey) Fenerbahçe Opet)	
3	(United States) Kaitlyn Chen ( (Czech Republic) ZVVZ USK Praha)	(United States) Kennedy Burke ( (Turkey) ÇIMSA CBK Mersin)	(France) Valériane Ayayi ( (Czech Republic) ZVVZ USK Praha)	(Hungary) Dorka Juhász ( (Turkey) Galatasaray Çağdaş Faktoring)	(Canada) Kayla Alexander ( (Spain) Valencia Basket)	
4	(Belgium) Julie Allemand ( (Turkey) Fenerbahçe Opet)	(Lithuania) Justė Jocytė ( (Spain) Spar Girona)	(France) Iliana Rupert ( (Turkey) Fenerbahçe Opet)	(Belgium) Julie Vanloo ( (Turkey) ÇIMSA CBK Mersin)	(Finland) Awak Kuier ( (Turkey) Galatasaray Çağdaş Faktoring)	
5	(Belgium) Julie Allemand ( (Turkey) Fenerbahçe Opet)	(France) Alix Duchet ( (France) Tango Bourges Basket)	(United States) Kathryn Westbeld ( (Hungary) DVTK HUN-Therm)	(Canada) Laeticia Amihere ( (Spain) Spar Girona)	(Slovenia) Jessica Shepard ( (Italy) Beretta Famila Schio)	
6	(France) Alix Duchet ( (France) Tango Bourges Basket)	(Belgium) Julie Allemand ( (Turkey) Fenerbahçe Opet)	(Belgium) Emma Meesseman ( (Turkey) Fenerbahçe Opet)	(Slovenia) Jessica Shepard ( (Italy) Beretta Famila Schio)	(Canada) Kayla Alexander ( (Spain) Valencia Basket)	

Second round

Round	PG	SG	SF	PF	C	Ref.
7	(France) Carla Leite ( (Spain) Casademont Zaragoza)	(France) Tima Pouye ( (France) Tango Bourges Basket)	(Mali) Mariam Coulibaly ( (Spain) Spar Girona)	(Canada) Laeticia Amihere ( (Spain) Spar Girona)	(France) Iliana Rupert ( (Turkey) Fenerbahçe Opet)	
8	(Lithuania) Justė Jocytė ( (Spain) Spar Girona)	(Spain) María Conde ( (Italy) Beretta Famila Schio)	(France) Valériane Ayayi ( (Czech Republic) ZVVZ USK Praha)	(Slovenia) Jessica Shepard ( (Italy) Beretta Famila Schio)	(Mali) Mariam Coulibaly ( (Spain) Spar Girona)	
9	(France) Leïla Lacan ( (France) Basket Landes)	(Canada) Bridget Carleton ( (Czech Republic) ZVVZ USK Praha)	(Spain) Helena Pueyo ( (Spain) Casademont Zaragoza)	(Belgium) Emma Meesseman ( (Turkey) Fenerbahçe Opet)	(Hungary) Dorka Juhász ( (Turkey) Galatasaray Çağdaş Faktoring)	
10	(France) Marine Johannès ( (Turkey) Galatasaray Çağdaş Faktoring)	(France) Gabby Williams ( (Turkey) Fenerbahçe Opet)	(Spain) Laura Quevedo ( (Spain) Spar Girona)	(Slovenia) Jessica Shepard ( (Italy) Beretta Famila Schio)	(North Macedonia) Merritt Hempe ( (Spain) Casademont Zaragoza)	
11	(Hungary) Réka Lelik ( (Hungary) DVTK HUN-Therm)	(France) Marine Johannès ( (Turkey) Galatasaray Çağdaş Faktoring)	(Australia) Chloe Bibby ( (Spain) Spar Girona)	(Nigeria) Murjanatu Musa ( (France) Basket Landes)	(Finland) Awak Kuier ( (Turkey) Galatasaray Çağdaş Faktoring)	
12	(France) Coline Franchelin ( (France) Flammes Carolo Basket)	(Canada) Bridget Carleton ( (Czech Republic) ZVVZ USK Praha)	(Belgium) Emma Meesseman ( (Turkey) Fenerbahçe Opet)	(Hungary) Dorka Juhász ( (Turkey) Galatasaray Çağdaş Faktoring)	(Finland) Awak Kuier ( (Turkey) Galatasaray Çağdaş Faktoring)	

Play-Ins

Round	PG	SG	SF	PF	C	Ref.
Game 1	(Belgium) Julie Allemand ( (Turkey) Fenerbahçe Opet)	(France) Leïla Lacan ( (France) Basket Landes)	(Belgium) Emma Meesseman ( (Turkey) Fenerbahçe Opet)	(Nigeria) Murjanatu Musa ( (France) Basket Landes)	(Hungary) Dorka Juhász ( (Turkey) Galatasaray Çağdaş Faktoring)	
Game 2	(Spain) Mariona Ortiz ( (Spain) Casademont Zaragoza)	(United States) Kayla McBride ( (Turkey) Fenerbahçe Opet)	(Slovenia) Jessica Shepard ( (Italy) Beretta Famila Schio)	(Nigeria) Murjanatu Musa ( (France) Basket Landes)	(France) Iliana Rupert ( (Turkey) Fenerbahçe Opet)	

Final Six

Round	PG	SG	SF	PF	C	Ref.
Quarterfinals	(Mali) Mariam Coulibaly ( (Spain) Spar Girona)	(Lithuania) Justė Jocytė ( (Spain) Spar Girona)	(Nigeria) Murjanatu Musa ( (France) Basket Landes)	(France) Ornella Bankole ( (Spain) Casademont Zaragoza)	(Croatia) Ivana Dojkić ( (Italy) Umana Reyer Venezia)	
Semifinals	(Sweden) Klara Holm ( (Spain) Spar Girona)	(France) Gabby Williams ( (Turkey) Fenerbahçe Opet)	(North Macedonia) Merritt Hempe ( (Spain) Casademont Zaragoza)	(United States) Elizabeth Williams ( (Turkey) Galatasaray Çağdaş Faktoring)	(Belgium) Emma Meesseman ( (Turkey) Fenerbahçe Opet)	

== Statistics ==
=== Individual statistics ===
==== Efficiency ====
Rank	Name	Team	Games	Efficiency	PIR
1.	(Slovenia) Jessica Shepard	(Italy) Beretta Famila Schio	15	322	21.5
2.	(Belgium) Emma Meesseman	(Turkey) Fenerbahçe Opet	15	299	19.9
3.	(France) Iliana Rupert	(Turkey) Fenerbahçe Opet	16	308	19.3
4.	(Belgium) Julie Allemand	(Turkey) Fenerbahçe Opet	16	283	17.7
5.	(Finland) Awak Kuier	(Turkey) Galatasaray Çağdaş Faktoring	19	332	17.5

==== Points ====
Rank	Name	Team	Games	Points	PPG
1.	(Slovenia) Jessica Shepard	(Italy) Beretta Famila Schio	15	255	17.0
2.	(Mali) Mariam Coulibaly	(Spain) Spar Girona	15	237	15.8
3.	(France) Iliana Rupert	(Turkey) Fenerbahçe Opet	16	251	15.7
4.	(France) Valériane Ayayi	(Czech Republic) ZVVZ USK Praha	14	214	15.3
5.	(Belgium) Emma Meesseman	(Turkey) Fenerbahçe Opet	15	223	14.9

==== Rebounds ====
Rank	Name	Team	Games	Rebounds	RPG
1.	(Slovenia) Jessica Shepard	(Italy) Beretta Famila Schio	15	142	9.5
2.	(Nigeria) Murjanatu Musa	(France) Basket Landes	16	133	8.3
3.	(Hungary) Dorka Juhász	(Turkey) Galatasaray Çağdaş Faktoring	18	144	8.0
4.	(Finland) Awak Kuier	(Turkey) Galatasaray Çağdaş Faktoring	19	151	7.9
5.	(Ivory Coast) Kariata Diaby	(France) Tango Bourges Basket	12	92	7.7

==== Assists ====
Rank	Name	Team	Games	Assists	APG
1.	(Belgium) Julie Allemand	(Turkey) Fenerbahçe Opet	16	122	7.6
2.	(France) Coline Franchelin	(France) Flammes Carolo Basket	11	70	6.4
3.	(Spain) María Conde	(Italy) Beretta Famila Schio	15	89	5.9
4.	(Spain) Mariona Ortiz	(Spain) Casademont Zaragoza	19	106	5.6
4.	(France) Pauline Astier	(Czech Republic) ZVVZ USK Praha	14	79	5.6

==== Steals ====
Rank	Name	Team	Games	Steals	SPG
1.	(France) Gabby Williams	(Turkey) Fenerbahçe Opet	10	30	3.0
2.	(Spain) Helena Pueyo	(Spain) Casademont Zaragoza	18	41	2.3
3.	(Spain) Laëtitia Guapo	(France) Tango Bourges Basket	13	27	2.1
3.	(France) Coline Franchelin	(France) Flammes Carolo Basket	11	26	2.1
3.	(Sweden) Klara Holm	(Spain) Spar Girona	16	34	2.1

==== Blocks ====
Rank	Name	Team	Games	Blocks	BPG
1.	(Finland) Awak Kuier	(Turkey) Galatasaray Çağdaş Faktoring	19	31	1.6
2.	(Hungary) Dorka Juhász	(Turkey) Galatasaray Çağdaş Faktoring	18	16	0.9
2.	(Belgium) Emma Meesseman	(Turkey) Fenerbahçe Opet	15	14	0.9
2.	(United States) Elizabeth Williams	(Turkey) Galatasaray Çağdaş Faktoring	15	13	0.9

==== Other statistics ====
Category	Player	Team	Games	Average
Turnovers	(France) Coline Franchelin	(France) Flammes Carolo Basket	11	3.8
FT %	(France) Iliana Rupert	(Turkey) Fenerbahçe Opet	16	88.2%
2-Point %	(France) Iliana Rupert	(Turkey) Fenerbahçe Opet	16	68.9%
3-Point %	(Canada) Bridget Carleton	(Czech Republic) ZVVZ USK Praha	11	53.3%

=== Individual game highs ===
Category	Player	Team	Statistic	Opponent
Efficiency	(Slovenia) Jessica Shepard	(Italy) Beretta Famila Schio	39	(Spain) Spar Girona (22 January 2026)
Efficiency	(Mali) Mariam Coulibaly	(Spain) Spar Girona	39	(France) Flammes Carolo Basket (17 December 2025)
Points	(Slovenia) Jessica Shepard	(Italy) Beretta Famila Schio	31	(Spain) Spar Girona (22 January 2026)
Rebounds	(Mali) Mariam Coulibaly	(Spain) Spar Girona	15	(Italy) Umana Reyer Venezia (15 April 2026)
Assists	(Belgium) Julie Allemand	(Turkey) Fenerbahçe Opet	12	(Greece) Olympiacos SFP (22 October 2025)
Assists	(Spain) Leticia Romero	(Spain) Valencia Basket	12	(Turkey) Fenerbahçe Opet (16 October 2025)
Steals	(France) Iliana Rupert	(Turkey) Fenerbahçe Opet	8	(France) Basket Landes (4 February 2026)
Blocks	(Canada) Laeticia Amihere	(Spain) Spar Girona	5	(Czech Republic) ZVVZ USK Praha (5 November 2025)

=== Team statistics ===
Category	Team	Average
Efficiency	(Turkey) Fenerbahçe Opet	107.3
Points	(Turkey) Fenerbahçe Opet	81.7
Rebounds	(Turkey) Galatasaray Çağdaş Faktoring	41.1
Assists	(Turkey) Fenerbahçe Opet	25.1
Steals	(Turkey) Fenerbahçe Opet	10.7
Blocks	(Turkey) Galatasaray Çağdaş Faktoring	4.2
Turnovers	(Hungary) DVTK HUN-Therm	17.4
FT %	(Turkey) Fenerbahçe Opet	83.2%
2-Point %	(Turkey) Fenerbahçe Opet	59.1%
3-Point %	(Italy) Beretta Famila Schio	37.5%

=== Team game highs ===
Category	Team	Statistic	Opponent
Efficiency	(Turkey) Fenerbahçe Opet	161	(Hungary) DVTK HUN-Therm (29 October 2025)
Points	(Turkey) Fenerbahçe Opet	113	(Hungary) DVTK HUN-Therm (29 October 2025)
Rebounds	(Turkey) Galatasaray Çağdaş Faktoring	59	(France) Basket Landes (3 March 2026)
Assists	(Turkey) Galatasaray Çağdaş Faktoring	35	(Hungary) Sopron Basket (26 November 2025)
Steals	(Turkey) Fenerbahçe Opet	17	(France) Basket Landes (4 February 2026)
Blocks	(Turkey) Galatasaray Çağdaş Faktoring	9	(Spain) Spar Girona (14 January 2026)

== Attendances ==
Pos	Team	Total	High	Low	Average	Change
1	Final Six in Zaragoza	52,952	10,828	5,024	8,825	+166.9%
2	(Spanish Basketball Federation) Casademont Zaragoza	54,850	9,215	4,784	6,856	+48.4%
3	(Spanish Basketball Federation) Valencia Basket	21,290	4,307	2,963	3,548	+30.2%
4	(French Federation of Basketball) Tango Bourges Basket	19,593	3,362	2,100	2,799	−26.2%
5	(Turkish Basketball Federation) Fenerbahçe Opet	19,422	4,000	1,500	2,775	+223.4%
6	(French Federation of Basketball) Basket Landes	18,200	2,600	2,600	2,600	+0.5%
7	(Spanish Basketball Federation) Spar Girona	17,364	3,221	1,968	2,481	n/a^{1}
8	(French Federation of Basketball) Flammes Carolo Basket	12,860	2,800	1,500	2,143	n/a^{1}
9	(Hungarian Basketball Federation) DVTK HUN-Therm	14,000	2,800	1,300	2,000	+71.4%
10	(Italian Basketball Federation) Beretta Famila Schio	13,488	2,358	1,500	1,927	+13.4%
11	(Italian Basketball Federation) Umana Reyer Venezia	13,038	3,506	658	1,449	+24.9%
12	(Turkish Basketball Federation) ÇBK Mersin	3,500	1,500	1,000	1,167	−58.1%
13	(Hungarian Basketball Federation) Sopron Basket	2,650	900	850	883	n/a^{1}
14	(Turkish Basketball Federation) Galatasaray Çağdaş Faktoring	7,607	1,104	200	845	n/a^{1}
15	(Czech Basketball Federation) ZVVZ USK Praha	5,724	1,210	536	818	−27.8%
16	(Polish Basketball Federation) VBW Gdynia	800	300	200	267	n/a^{1}
17	(Hellenic Basketball Federation) Olympiacos SFP	750	200	350	250	0.0%
	League total	278,088	10,828	200	2,648	+12.3%

Source: EuroLeague Women
Notes:
1: Team did not participate in the last EuroLeague regular season.

== See also ==
- 2025–26 EuroCup Women
- 2025–26 EuroCup Women qualification round
- 2025–26 EuroCup Women regular season
- 2025–26 EuroCup Women knockout stage
- 2025 FIBA Europe SuperCup Women
- 2025–26 EuroLeague
