= 2024 FIBA Women's Olympic Qualifying Tournaments – Antwerp =

Basketball tournament in Belgium

2024 FIBA World Olympic Qualifying Tournament for Women
Tournament details
- Host country: Belgium
- City: Antwerp
- Dates: 8–11 February
- Teams: 4 (from 3 confederations)
- Venue: 1 (in 1 host city)

Final positions
- Champions: United States
- Runners-up: Belgium
- Third place: Nigeria
- Fourth place: Senegal

Tournament statistics
- Games played: 6
- Attendance: 55,653 (9,276 per game)
- MVP: (Belgium) Emma Meesseman
- Top scorer: (Senegal) Yacine Diop (19.7 ppg)

Official website
- WOQT Belgium

The 2024 FIBA Women's Olympic Qualifying Tournament in Antwerp was one of four 2024 FIBA Women's Olympic Qualifying Tournaments. The tournament was held at Antwerp, Belgium, from 8 to 11 February 2024, to determine the competitors for the 2024 Summer Olympics basketball tournament.

== Teams ==
Team	Qualification	Date of qualification	WR
United States	Winner of the 2022 World Cup	1 October 2022	1
Belgium	Top six at EuroBasket Women 2023	22 June 2023	6
Nigeria	Top two at 2023 Women's Afrobasket	3 August 2023	11
Senegal	Top two at 2023 Women's Afrobasket	3 August 2023	20

== Venue ==
Antwerp	2024 FIBA Women's Olympic Qualifying Tournaments – Antwerp (Belgium)
Sportpaleis	2024 FIBA Women's Olympic Qualifying Tournaments – Antwerp (Belgium)
Capacity: 18,575	2024 FIBA Women's Olympic Qualifying Tournaments – Antwerp (Belgium)

== Standings ==
Pos	Team	Pld	W	L	PF	PA	PD	Pts	Qualification
1	United States (Note: The United States was already qualified as World Cup winners.)	3	3	0	282	164	+118	6	Summer Olympics
2	Belgium (H)	3	2	1	254	208	+46	5	Summer Olympics
3	Nigeria	3	1	2	179	243	−64	4	Summer Olympics
4	Senegal	3	0	3	170	270	−100	3	

Source: FIBA
Rules for classification: 1) Points; 2) Head-to-head results; 3) Points difference; 4) Points scored.
(H) Hosts

== Results ==
All times are local (UTC+1).

8 February 2024
18:15

Boxscore

Senegal	65–72	Nigeria
Scoring by quarter: 18–20, 28–17, 11–12, 8–23
Pts: Y. Diop 23; Rebs: Kané 7 Asts: Dillard 7		Pts: Okonkwo 21; Rebs: Okonkwo 10; Asts: Balogun, Ogoke 5

Sportpaleis, Antwerp
Attendance: 9,000
Referees: Rabah Noujaim (LBN), Ventsislav Velikov (BUL), Amel Dahra (FRA)

8 February 2024
20:45

Boxscore

United States	81–79	Belgium
Scoring by quarter: 15–19, 19–24, 23–23, 24–13
Pts: Collier 23; Rebs: Collier, Thomas 7 Asts: Atkins, Copper 4		Pts: Vanloo 19; Rebs: Meesseman 8 Asts: Meesseman 7

Sportpaleis, Antwerp
Attendance: 13,700
Referees: Viola Györgyi (ROU), Martin Vulić (CRO), Waseem Husainy (CAN)

9 February 2024
18:15

Boxscore

Nigeria	46–100	United States
Scoring by quarter: 13–19, 7–32, 15–24, 11–25
Pts: Musa 13; Rebs: Kunaiyi-Akpannah 6 Asts: Balogun 3		Pts: Loyd 18; Rebs: Stewart 7 Asts: Plum 9

Sportpaleis, Antwerp
Attendance: 3,570
Referees: Rabah Noujaim (LBN), Ventsislav Velikov (BUL), Yann Davidson (MAD)

9 February 2024
20:45

Boxscore

Belgium	97–66	Senegal
Scoring by quarter: 23–15, 19–18, 31–11, 24–22
Pts: Meesseman 32; Rebs: Meesseman 7 Asts: Allemand 14		Pts: Y. Diop 22; Rebs: Dillard 6 Asts: Kané 6

Sportpaleis, Antwerp
Attendance: 7,188
Referees: Martin Vulić (CRO), Waseem Husainy (CAN), Yasmina Alcaraz (ESP)

11 February 2024
16:45

Boxscore

Belgium	78–61	Nigeria
Scoring by quarter: 22–11, 18–18, 23–13, 15–19
Pts: Delaere 15; Rebs: Meesseman 8 Asts: Meesseman 8		Pts: Balogun 17; Rebs: Kunaiyi-Akpannah 9 Asts: Amukamara, Okoro 4

Sportpaleis, Antwerp
Attendance: 11,645
Referees: Martin Vulić (CRO), Yasmina Alcaraz (ESP), Yann Davidson (MAD)

11 February 2024
19:15

Boxscore

Senegal	39–101	United States
Scoring by quarter: 15–29, 8–21, 9–26, 7–25
Pts: Y. Diop 14; Rebs: Diagne 6 Asts: Dillard 4		Pts: Howard 25; Rebs: Boston 8 Asts: Thomas 5

Sportpaleis, Antwerp
Attendance: 10,550
Referees: Viola Györgyi (ROU), Ventsislav Velikov (BUL), Amel Dahra (FRA)

== Statistics and awards ==
=== Statistical leaders ===
Players

Points

Name	PPG
(Senegal) Yacine Diop	19.7
(United States) Rhyne Howard	19.5
(United States) Napheesa Collier	19.0
(Belgium) Emma Meesseman	17.3
(Nigeria) Amy Okonkwo	15.3

Rebounds

Name	RPG
(Belgium) Emma Meesseman	7.7
(Nigeria) Pallas Kunaiyi-Akpannah	6.3
(Nigeria) Amy Okonkwo	6.0
(United States) Breanna Stewart	5.7
(United States) Alyssa Thomas	5.7

Assists

Name	APG
(Belgium) Julie Allemand	10.0
(Belgium) Emma Meesseman	5.7
(Belgium) Julie Vanloo	5.7
(United States) Kelsey Plum	4.7
(Senegal) Cierra Dillard	4.3

Blocks

Name	BPG
(Senegal) Ndioma Kané	2.0
(Nigeria) Murjanatu Musa	1.0
(Senegal) Maimouna Diarra	1.0
(United States) Aliyah Boston	1.0
(Belgium) Emma Meesseman	0.7
(Nigeria) Amy Okonkwo	0.7
(Senegal) Fatou Diagne	0.7

Steals

Name	SPG
(United States) Napheesa Collier	3.7
(Belgium) Julie Allemand	3.0
(Belgium) Emma Meesseman	3.0
(Belgium) Elise Ramette	2.0
(Belgium) Maxuelle Lisowa-Mbaka	1.7
(Nigeria) Promise Amukamara	1.7
(Nigeria) Amy Okonkwo	1.7
(Senegal) Oumoul Sarr	1.7

Efficiency

Name	EFFPG
(Belgium) Emma Meesseman	26.7
(United States) Napheesa Collier	22.7
(United States) Rhyne Howard	21.5
(Belgium) Julie Allemand	20.0
(Nigeria) Amy Okonkwo	16.3

==== Teams ====
Points

Team	PPG
United States	94.0
Belgium	84.7
Nigeria	59.7
Senegal	56.7

Rebounds

Team	RPG
United States	44.0
Nigeria	40.3
Belgium	33.7
Senegal	32.3

Assists

Team	APG
Belgium	27.7
United States	23.3
Nigeria	14.7
Senegal	13.7

Blocks

Team	BPG
Senegal	3.7
Nigeria	2.3
United States	2.0
Belgium	1.3

Steals

Team	SPG
Belgium	12.0
United States	11.0
Nigeria	6.7
Senegal	5.7

Efficiency

Team	EFFPG
United States	119.3
Belgium	102.0
Nigeria	51.3
Senegal	49.0

=== Awards ===
The all star-team and MVP were announced on 11 February 2024.

All-Star Team
Guards	Forwards
(United States) Rhyne Howard	(Senegal) Yacine Diop (Nigeria) Amy Okonkwo (Belgium) Emma Meesseman (United States) Napheesa Collier
MVP: (Belgium) Emma Meesseman
