= 2024–25 Liga Femenina de Baloncesto =

62nd season of the Spanish women's basketball league

Liga Femenina Endesa^{1}
- Season: 2024–25
- Matches played: 254
- Teams: 16

Regular season
- Top seed: Spar Girona
- Season MVP: (Australia) Chloe Bibby
- Relegated: Celta Femxa Zorka; Osés Construcción

Finals
- Champions: Valencia Basket (3rd title)
- Runners-up: Casademont Zaragoza
- Semi-finalists: Spar Girona; Perfumerías Avenida
- Finals MVP: (Canada) Kayla Alexander

Statistical leaders
Points	(Mali) Mariam Coulibaly	21.9
Rebounds	(Mali) Mariam Coulibaly	10.7
Assists	(Spain) Mariona Ortiz	5.1
Steals	(Spain) Claudia Soriano	3.3
Blocks	(Rwanda) Bella Murekatete	0.9

Records
- Biggest home win: Valencia 102–49 Gernika (22 February 2025)
- Biggest away win: Gran Canaria 41–82 Girona (15 March 2025)
- Highest scoring: Joventut 97–90 Ferrol (12 January 2025)
- ^{1} Sponsored league name, referring to Endesa.

The 2024–25 Liga Femenina de Baloncesto, also known as Liga Femenina Endesa for sponsorship reasons, was the 62nd season of the Spanish basketball women's league. It started on 4 October 2024 with the first round of the regular season and ended on 11 May 2025 with the finals.

Valencia Basket defended successfully the title by achieving its third consecutive league after sweep Casademont Zaragoza in the finals.

== Teams ==
=== Promotion and relegation (pre-season) ===
A total of 16 teams contested the league, including 14 sides from the 2023–24 season and two promoted from the 2023–24 LF Challenge.

▲ Promoted from LF Challenge	▼ Relegated to LF Challenge
Osés Construcción; Club Joventut Badalona	~~Spar Gran Canaria~~ (Note: It swapped places with Barça CBS that withdrew to play in the league.); Embutidos Pajariel Bembibre PDM

=== Venues and locations ===
Location of teams in 2024–25 Liga Femenina
Location of teams from the Canary Islands in 2024–25 Liga Femenina

Team	Home city	Arena	Capacity
Baxi Ferrol	Ferrol	A Malata	4,200
Cadí La Seu	La Seu d'Urgell	Palau d'Esports	800
Casademont Zaragoza	Zaragoza	Pabellón Príncipe Felipe	10,744
Celta Femxa Zorka	Vigo	Navia	1,500
Club Joventut Badalona	Badalona	Palau Municipal d'Esports	12,760
Durán Maquinaria Ensino	Lugo	Pazo dos Deportes	5,310
Hozono Global Jairis	Alcantarilla	Fausto Vicent	1,240
IDK Euskotren	San Sebastián	José Antonio Gasca	2,500
Kutxabank Araski	Vitoria-Gasteiz	Mendizorrotza	2,603
Lointek Gernika Bizkaia	Gernika	Maloste	800
Movistar Estudiantes	Madrid	Antonio Magariños	600
Osés Construcción	Zizur Mayor	Arrosadía	1,500
Perfumerías Avenida	Salamanca	Würzburg	3,000
Spar Girona	Girona	Fontajau	5,200
Spar Gran Canaria	Las Palmas	La Paterna	1,600
Valencia Basket	Valencia	La Fonteta	8,500

== Regular season ==
=== League table ===
Pos	Team	Pld	W	L	PF	PA	PD	Pts	Qualification or relegation
1	Spar Girona	30	26	4	2438	1986	+452	56	Qualification to playoffs
2	Valencia Basket	30	24	6	2388	1907	+481	54	Qualification to playoffs
3	Perfumerías Avenida	30	22	8	2221	1965	+256	52	Qualification to playoffs
4	Casademont Zaragoza	30	20	10	2241	1971	+270	50	Qualification to playoffs
5	Hozono Global Jairis	30	18	12	2178	2013	+165	48	Qualification to playoffs
6	Movistar Estudiantes	30	17	13	2108	2103	+5	47	Qualification to playoffs
7	Club Joventut Badalona	30	16	14	2160	2172	−12	46	Qualification to playoffs
8	Baxi Ferrol	30	15	15	2065	2120	−55	45	Qualification to playoffs
9	Lointek Gernika Bizkaia	30	14	16	1963	2042	−79	44	
10	Spar Gran Canaria	30	12	18	1941	2099	−158	42	
11	Cadí La Seu	30	12	18	2023	2140	−117	42	
12	Durán Maquinaria Ensino	30	11	19	2072	2127	−55	41	
13	Kutxabank Araski	30	10	20	2061	2216	−155	40	
14	IDK Euskotren	30	10	20	1916	2089	−173	40	
15	Celta Femxa Zorka	30	9	21	1949	2238	−289	39	Relegation to LF Challenge
16	Osés Construcción	30	4	26	1827	2363	−536	34	Relegation to LF Challenge

Source: FEB

=== Results ===
Home \ Away	FER	CLS	CAZ	CEL	JOV	ENS	JAI	IDK	ARA	GER	EST	ARD	AVE	UNI	SGC	VBC
Baxi Ferrol	—	67–61	48–79	72–65	65–76	61–59	82–72	62–51	70–59	80–56	67–54	71–49	59–83	72–70	51–65	54–74
Cadí La Seu	73–49	—	60–70	91–79	78–83	82–72	79–68	69–65	66–55	65–62	72–70	67–51	63–69	77–80	76–79	56–81
Casademont Zaragoza	73–72	81–65	—	62–65	77–66	75–59	70–68	75–61	85–60	71–64	81–48	84–37	72–64	66–82	66–50	79–52
Celta Femxa Zorka	72–69	65–71	77–78	—	42–78	66–73	55–78	66–60	71–63	54–57	80–71	72–59	63–76	52–83	51–50	52–82
Club Joventut Badalona	97–90	70–77	78–76	80–72	—	72–67	47–58	65–74	93–84	69–55	73–76	79–63	70–62	63–78	67–58	65–76
Durán Maquinaria Ensino	92–86	64–68	66–75	57–82	64–66	—	67–65	69–74	66–57	69–72	72–77	70–72	69–64	85–91	76–54	60–77
Hozono Global Jairis	80–82	80–66	77–76	90–64	85–72	75–73	—	73–54	64–57	59–66	82–60	79–45	64–67	71–76	69–66	73–70
IDK Euskotren	68–84	77–73	76–72	65–59	56–66	46–75	59–67	—	71–72	57–66	68–56	81–74	56–57	66–72	67–52	67–63
Kutxabank Araski	71–72	85–68	83–75	68–78	73–84	67–66	52–71	74–50	—	43–53	85–81	86–57	65–93	86–95	74–67	67–76
Lointek Gernika Bizkaia	70–57	72–66	73–70	80–69	75–57	66–74	50–74	71–65	59–74	—	62–75	90–61	77–79	76–85	53–60	68–75
Movistar Estudiantes	69–68	75–58	90–72	83–63	83–74	73–83	66–57	76–67	80–56	74–55	—	71–62	56–84	67–87	75–63	61–65
Osés Construcción	68–83	66–53	51–84	81–72	52–90	66–70	83–81	66–93	86–91	53–63	60–77	—	64–78	67–91	56–66	57–79
Perfumerías Avenida	70–79	61–52	68–78	78–62	96–69	67–56	60–64	83–58	87–75	76–56	72–55	91–62	—	67–76	67–74	76–73
Spar Girona	78–68	82–58	82–69	108–59	97–47	83–67	89–70	81–57	76–61	73–62	75–62	86–62	58–71	—	79–60	80–88
Spar Gran Canaria	80–60	69–63	47–87	85–76	82–76	62–63	78–92	70–58	87–63	56–85	63–66	72–54	59–62	41–82	—	69–103
Valencia Basket	73–70	93–50	82–63	90–46	81–68	86–69	82–72	81–49	69–55	102–49	77–81	93–43	81–93	69–63	82–57	—

Source: FEB
Legend: Blue = home team win; Red = away team win.

== Playoffs ==
=== Bracket ===
Quarter-finals
2	Valencia Basket	64	88	152
7	Club Joventut Badalona	60	81	141
3	Perfumerías Avenida	65	61	126
6	Movistar Estudiantes	60	54	114
1	Spar Girona	71	72	143
8	Baxi Ferrol	60	62	122
4	Casademont Zaragoza	68	78	146
5	Hozono Global Jairis	70	66	136

Semi-finals
2	Valencia Basket	76	75	151
3	Perfumerías Avenida	76	62	138
1	Spar Girona	50	88	138
4	Casademont Zaragoza	69	75	144

Final
2	Valencia Basket	75	71	2
4	Casademont Zaragoza	65	63	0

Source: FEB

=== Quarter-finals ===
The first legs were played on 24 April and the second legs on 27 April 2025.

Team 1	Agg.	Team 2	1st leg	2nd leg
Spar Girona	143–122	Baxi Ferrol	71–60	72–62
Valencia Basket	152–141	Club Joventut Badalona	64–60	88–81
Perfumerías Avenida	126–114	Movistar Estudiantes	65–60	61–54
Casademont Zaragoza	146–136	Hozono Global Jairis	68–70	78–66

Source: FEB

==== First leg ====
24 April 2025	Movistar Estudiantes	60–65	Perfumerías Avenida	Madrid
20:00	Scoring by quarter: 19–24, 8–9, 16–10, 17–22
	Pts: Whittle 17; Rebs: Banaszak 7 Asts: four players 3 Eff: Camilión 19	Boxscore	Pts: Koné 21; Rebs: Koné 15; Asts: Gil 5 Eff: Koné 30	Arena: Antonio Magariños; Attendance: 811; Referees: Daniel Checa, Juan Pedro Morales, Miquel Remisa

24 April 2025	Baxi Ferrol	60–71	Spar Girona	Ferrol
20:15	Scoring by quarter: 10–25, 23–22, 12–10, 15–14
	Pts: Millán 16; Rebs: Pospíšilová 7 Asts: Melia, Pospíšilová 3 Eff: Millán 21	Boxscore	Pts: three players 14; Rebs: Canella 7 Asts: Ygueravide 6 Eff: Ygueravide 14	Arena: A Malata; Attendance: 2,325; Referees: Enrique López, Jorge Baena, Pablo Rodríguez

24 April 2025	Club Joventut Badalona	60–64	Valencia Basket	Badalona
20:30	Scoring by quarter: 8–9, 17–20, 14–22, 21–13
	Pts: Dembélé 18; Rebs: Coulibaly 13; Asts: Ramette 5 Eff: Dembélé 20	Boxscore	Pts: Fiebich 23; Rebs: Alexander 9 Asts: Torrens 7 Eff: Fiebich 26	Arena: Palau Municipal d'Esports; Attendance: 1,505; Referees: Paula Lema, Fernando Ibáñez, Cristina Adán

24 April 2025	Hozono Global Jairis	70–68	Casademont Zaragoza	Alcantarilla
21:00	Scoring by quarter: 18–25, 8–11, 15–14, 29–18
	Pts: Ayuso 17; Rebs: Ayuso 8 Asts: Ayuso 7 Eff: Ayuso 32	Boxscore	Pts: Hempe 18; Rebs: Mawuli 6 Asts: Ortiz 4 Eff: Hempe 18	Arena: Fausto Vicent; Attendance: 1,132; Referees: Javier Ávila, Juan Ramón Hurtado, Eva Aresté

==== Second leg ====
27 April 2025	Perfumerías Avenida	61–54 (126–114 agg.)	Movistar Estudiantes	Salamanca
12:00	Scoring by quarter: 13–14, 16–20, 17–6, 15–4
	Pts: Carter, Martín 11; Rebs: Koné 13; Asts: Gil 6 Eff: Koné 17	Boxscore	Pts: Whittle 12; Rebs: Banaszak 7 Asts: Salvadores 4 Eff: Camilión 11	Arena: Würzburg; Attendance: 3,000; Referees: Rodrigo Palanca, Jorge Muñoz, Juan Gabriel Carpallo

27 April 2025	Spar Girona	72–62 (143–122 agg.)	Baxi Ferrol	Girona
18:10	Scoring by quarter: 19–19, 11–14, 20–11, 22–18
	Pts: Pierre-Louis 16; Rebs: Pierre-Louis 7 Asts: Lundquist 4 Eff: Pierre-Louis 20	Boxscore	Pts: Mataix, Sánchez-Ramos 11; Rebs: Pospíšilová 6 Asts: three players 3 Eff: Pospíšilová 14	Arena: Fontajau; Attendance: 1,527; Referees: Antonio Manuel Zamora, Pol Franquesa, José María Arresa

27 April 2025	Casademont Zaragoza	78–66 (146–136 agg.)	Hozono Global Jairis	Zaragoza
18:15	Scoring by quarter: 18–10, 28–24, 18–16, 14–16
	Pts: Fraser 22; Rebs: Ortiz 7 Asts: Ortiz 9 Eff: Fraser 21	Boxscore	Pts: Eldebrink 16; Rebs: Ayuso, Gray 8 Asts: Ayuso, Holešínská 4 Eff: Ayuso 17	Arena: Pabellón Príncipe Felipe; Attendance: 5,057; Referees: Ariadna Chueca, Sandra Sánchez, Jordi Domingo

27 April 2025	Valencia Basket	88–81 (152–141 agg.)	Club Joventut Badalona	Valencia
19:00	Scoring by quarter: 17–19, 24–20, 21–20, 26–22
	Pts: Torrens 24; Rebs: Fingall 9 Asts: Fiebich 5 Eff: Torrens 28	Boxscore	Pts: Coulibaly 27; Rebs: Cruz 7 Asts: Ramette, Santibáñez 6 Eff: Coulibaly 23	Arena: La Fonteta; Attendance: 2,503; Referees: Víctor Mas, Jesús Marcos Martínez, José Carlos Sierra

=== Semi-finals ===
The first legs were played on 1 May and the second legs on 4 May 2025.

Team 1	Agg.	Team 2	1st leg	2nd leg
Spar Girona	138–144	Casademont Zaragoza	50–69	88–75
Valencia Basket	151–138	Perfumerías Avenida	76–76	75–62

Source: FEB

==== First leg ====
1 May 2025	Perfumerías Avenida	76–76	Valencia Basket	Salamanca
18:00	Scoring by quarter: 20–18, 21–25, 23–12, 12–21
	Pts: Carter 18; Rebs: Koné 7 Asts: Martín 5 Eff: Martín 22	Boxscore	Pts: Carrera 29; Rebs: Carrera 7 Asts: Iagupova 7 Eff: Carrera 47	Arena: Würzburg; Attendance: 3,000; Referees: Asier Quintas, Francisco González, Alejandro Benavente

1 May 2025	Casademont Zaragoza	69–50	Spar Girona	Zaragoza
18:15	Scoring by quarter: 18–15, 19–9, 17–11, 15–15
	Pts: Mawuli, Pueyo 14; Rebs: Pueyo 9 Asts: Ortiz 6 Eff: Mawuli 26	Boxscore	Pts: Hristova 15; Rebs: Canella 10; Asts: four players 2 Eff: Canella 22	Arena: Pabellón Príncipe Felipe; Attendance: 6,793; Referees: Germán Morales, Josep María Olivares, Sergio Acevedo

==== Second leg ====
4 May 2025	Spar Girona	88–75(OT) (138–144 agg.)	Casademont Zaragoza	Girona
18:00	Scoring by quarter: 22–9, 19–16, 21–19, 15–14, Overtime: 11–17
	Pts: López, Pierre-Louis 14; Rebs: Canella 10; Asts: Canella 4 Eff: Canella 21	Boxscore	Pts: Ortiz 24; Rebs: Ortiz 8 Asts: Ortiz 5 Eff: Ortiz 31	Arena: Fontajau; Attendance: 3,528; Referees: Ángel de Lucas, Héctor Báez, Jorge Caamaño

4 May 2025	Valencia Basket	75–62 (151–138 agg.)	Perfumerías Avenida	Valencia
19:00	Scoring by quarter: 18–16, 22–23, 20–13, 15–10
	Pts: Alexander 16; Rebs: Alexander 12; Asts: Iagupova 6 Eff: Alexander 25	Boxscore	Pts: Carter 17; Rebs: Koné 14; Asts: Domínguez 5 Eff: Koné 19	Arena: La Fonteta; Attendance: 5,400; Referees: Carlos García, Jaime Gómez, Héctor Sanhermelando

=== Final ===
The first leg was played on 8 May and the second leg on 11 May 2025.

Team 1	Series	Team 2	1st leg	2nd leg	3rd leg
Valencia Basket	2–0	Casademont Zaragoza	75–65	71–63	—

Source: FEB

==== First leg ====
8 May 2025	Valencia Basket	75–65 (Series: 1–0)	Casademont Zaragoza	Valencia
20:45	Scoring by quarter: 21–12, 16–12, 17–21, 21–20
	Pts: Alexander 18; Rebs: Fiebich, Iagupova 7 Asts: Iagupova, Romero 4 Eff: Alexander 25	Boxscore	Pts: Mawuli 14; Rebs: Oma 8 Asts: Flores 5 Eff: Ortiz 16	Arena: La Fonteta; Attendance: 4,000; Referees: Francisco José Zafra, Daniel Checa, Fernando Ibáñez

==== Second leg ====
11 May 2025	Casademont Zaragoza	63–71 (Series: 0–2)	Valencia Basket	Zaragoza
21:00	Scoring by quarter: 16–13, 19–25, 17–23, 11–10
	Pts: Atkinson 14; Rebs: three players 4 Asts: Hempe, Oma 2 Eff: Atkinson 22	Boxscore	Pts: Alexander 15; Rebs: Alexander 8 Asts: Fingall 2 Eff: Carrera 16	Arena: Pabellón Príncipe Felipe; Attendance: 10,857; Referees: Leandro Lezcano, Rodrigo Palanca, Cristina Adán

== Final standings ==
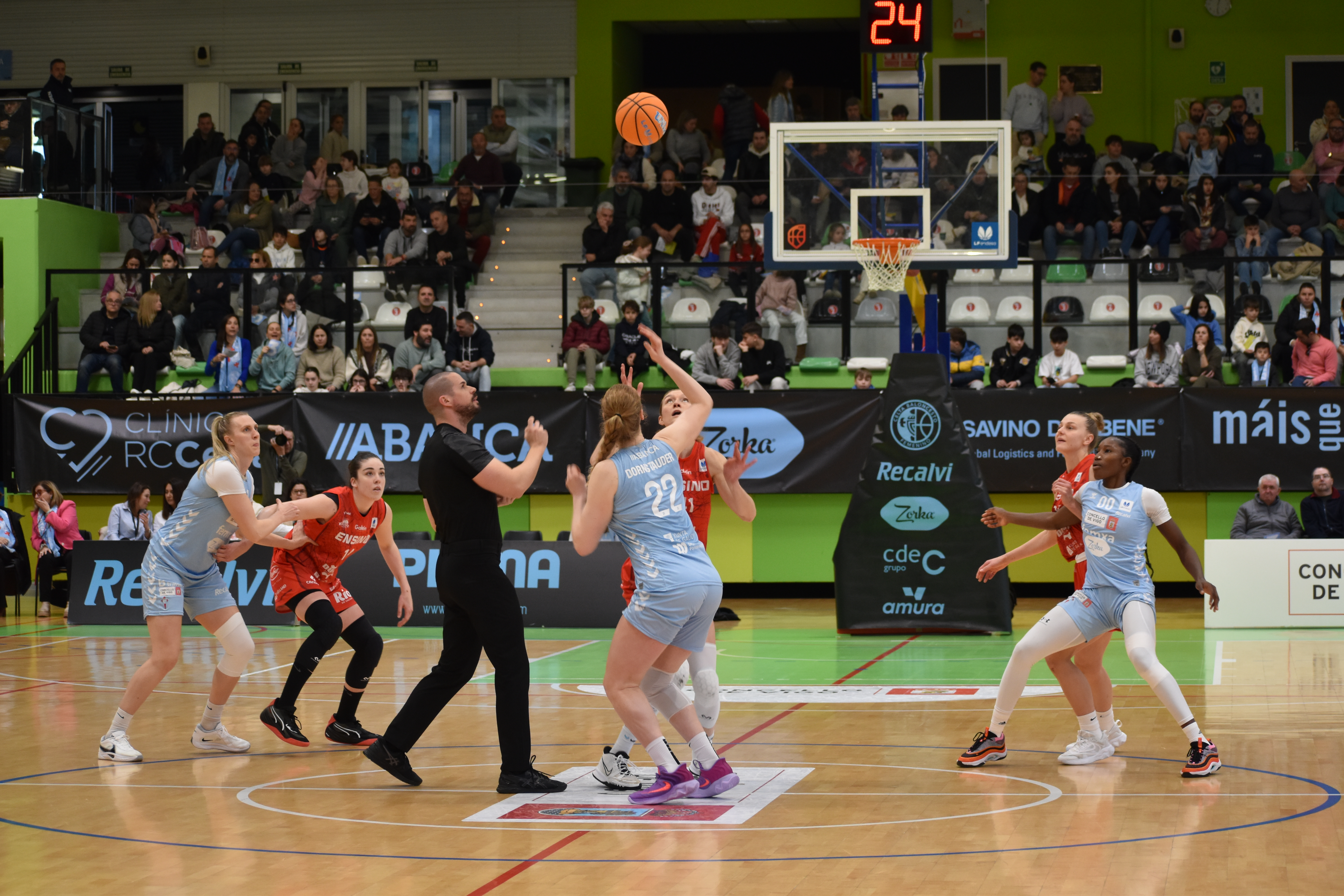
Regular season match between Celta Femxa Zorka and Durán Maquinaria Ensino Lugo.

Pos	Team	Pld	W	D	L	Qualification or relegation
1	Valencia Basket (C)	36	29	1	6	Qualification to EuroLeague regular season
2	Casademont Zaragoza	36	22	0	14	Qualification to EuroLeague qualifying round
3	Spar Girona (Note: Spar Girona qualified to the EuroLeague as regular season winners.) (X)	34	29	0	5	Qualification to EuroLeague regular season
4	Perfumerías Avenida	34	24	1	9	Qualification to EuroCup group stage
5	Hozono Global Jairis (Note: Hozono Global Jairis qualified to the EuroCup as cup winners.) (Y)	32	19	0	13	Qualification to EuroCup group stage
6	Movistar Estudiantes	32	17	0	15	Qualification to EuroCup group stage
7	Club Joventut Badalona	32	16	0	16	Qualification to EuroCup group stage
8	Baxi Ferrol	32	15	0	17	Qualification to EuroCup qualification round
9	Lointek Gernika Bizkaia	30	14	0	16	
10	Spar Gran Canaria	30	12	0	18	
11	Cadí La Seu	30	12	0	18	
12	Durán Maquinaria Ensino	30	11	0	19	
13	Kutxabank Araski	30	10	0	20	
14	IDK Euskotren	30	10	0	20	
15	Celta Femxa Zorka (R)	30	9	0	21	Relegation to LF Challenge
16	Osés Construcción (R)	30	4	0	26	Relegation to LF Challenge

Source: FEB
(C) Champions; (R) Relegated; (X) Regular season winners; (Y) Cup winners
