= Dorka Juhász =

Hungarian basketball player (born 1999)

- Juhász with the Galatasaray in 2026

No. 14 – Galatasaray
- Position: Forward
- League: Turkish Super League; EuroLeague Women; WNBA

Personal information
- Born: 18 December 1999 (age 26) Pécs, Hungary
- Listed height: 6 ft 5 in (1.96 m)
- Listed weight: 190 lb (86 kg)

Career information
- High school: PTE Babits
- College: Ohio State (2018–2021); UConn (2021–2023)
- WNBA draft: 2023: 2nd round, 16th overall pick
- Drafted by: Minnesota Lynx
- Playing career: 2023–present

Career history
- 2023–present: Minnesota Lynx
- 2023–2025: Famila Basket Schio
- 2025–present: Galatasaray

Career highlights
- EuroLeague MVP (2026); WNBA Commissioner's Cup Champion (2024); Italian Cup winner (2024); WNBA All-Rookie Team (2023); Second-team All-Big East (2023); 2× First-team All-Big Ten (2020, 2021); Second-team All-Big Ten (2019); Big Ten All-Freshman team (2019)
- Stats at Basketball Reference

Dorka Kata Juhász (born 18 December 1999) is a Hungarian professional basketball player for the Minnesota Lynx of the Women's National Basketball Association (WNBA) and for Galatasaray of the Women's Basketball Super League. She played college basketball at Ohio State and UConn. She was selected 16th overall by the Lynx in the 2023 WNBA draft.

== College career ==
Juhász committed to play at Ohio State in March 2018. She was rated as the 12th-best international player from 2018 class and the 5th-best forward. She also considered Missouri and Louisville. Juhász spent three seasons with the Buckeyes before entering herself into the transfer portal. Juhász stated that the desire to continue to improve as a player, as well as her aspirations to play at the professional level as the key reasons why she ultimately decided it was her time to leave the Buckeyes. After a week in the portal, Juhász announced that she would be transferring to the UConn Huskies.

== Professional career ==
=== WNBA ===
==== Minnesota Lynx (2023–present) ====
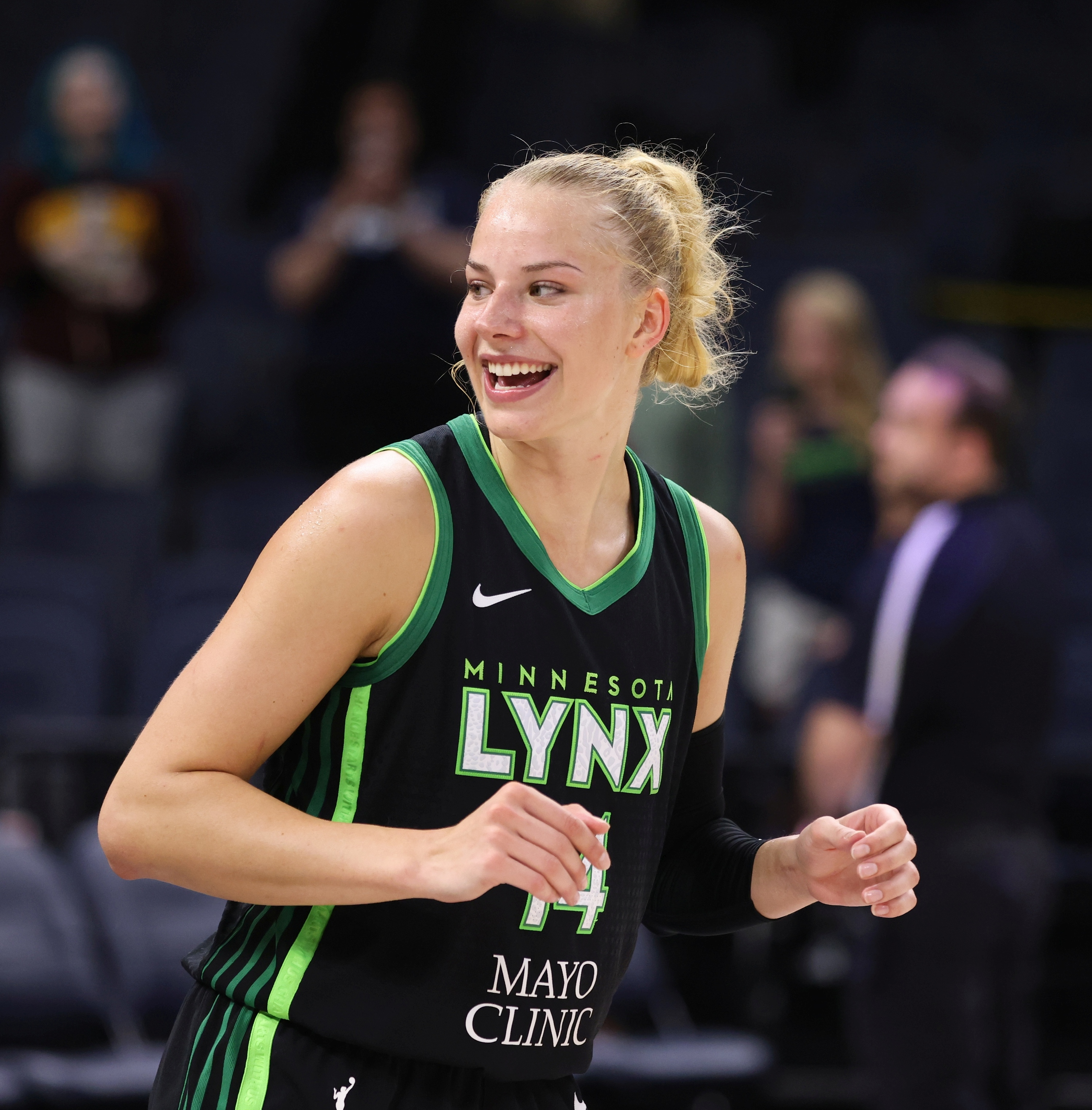
Juhász with the Minnesota Lynx in 2023

Juhász was selected 16th overall by the Minnesota Lynx in the 2023 WNBA draft. She made her WNBA debut on 19 May 2023, when the Lynx played the Chicago Sky. She scored 5 points and got 3 rebounds in 15 minutes. In the Lynx game on July 20, 2023, she became the only rookie to score 15+ points, 10+ rebounds, 3+ assists, and 2+ steals on 70% or better shooting from the field in the regular season. She was named to the 2023 WNBA All-Rookie Team along with her teammate, Diamond Miller.

Juhász arrived late for the start of her second season after finishing her season with Schio, making her season debut with Minnesota on 25 May. She played from the bench for most of the season, starting in only seven games, mostly in July during Napheesa Collier's absence. In her 34 appearances, she averaged 4.8 points and 3.8 rebounds in 16.1 minutes per game.

On 11 May 2025, the Lynx announced that Juhász would miss the 2025 season, wanting to rest after playing year-around for two years.

On May 8, 2026, she returned to Lynx.

=== Europe ===
==== Famila Basket Schio (2023–2025) ====
In June 2023, Juhász signed with Famila Basket Schio of the Lega Basket Femminile and EuroLeague to play in the 2023–2024 season. On 18 February 2024, Schio won the Italian Cup, defeating Umana Reyer Venezia in the final 81–68. Juhász had 4 points and 9 rebounds.

Juhász returned to Schio for the 2024–2025 season.

==== Galatasaray (2025–present) ====
On June 16, 2025, she signed with Galatasaray of the Turkish Women's Basketball Super League (TKBL).

Juhasz was named the 2025-26 EuroLeague MVP and was named in the All-EuroLeague Women First Team squad. At 26 years old, she is the youngest winner of the MVP in the competition's history.

She extended her contract with Galatasaray for one year on July 13, 2026.

== National team career ==
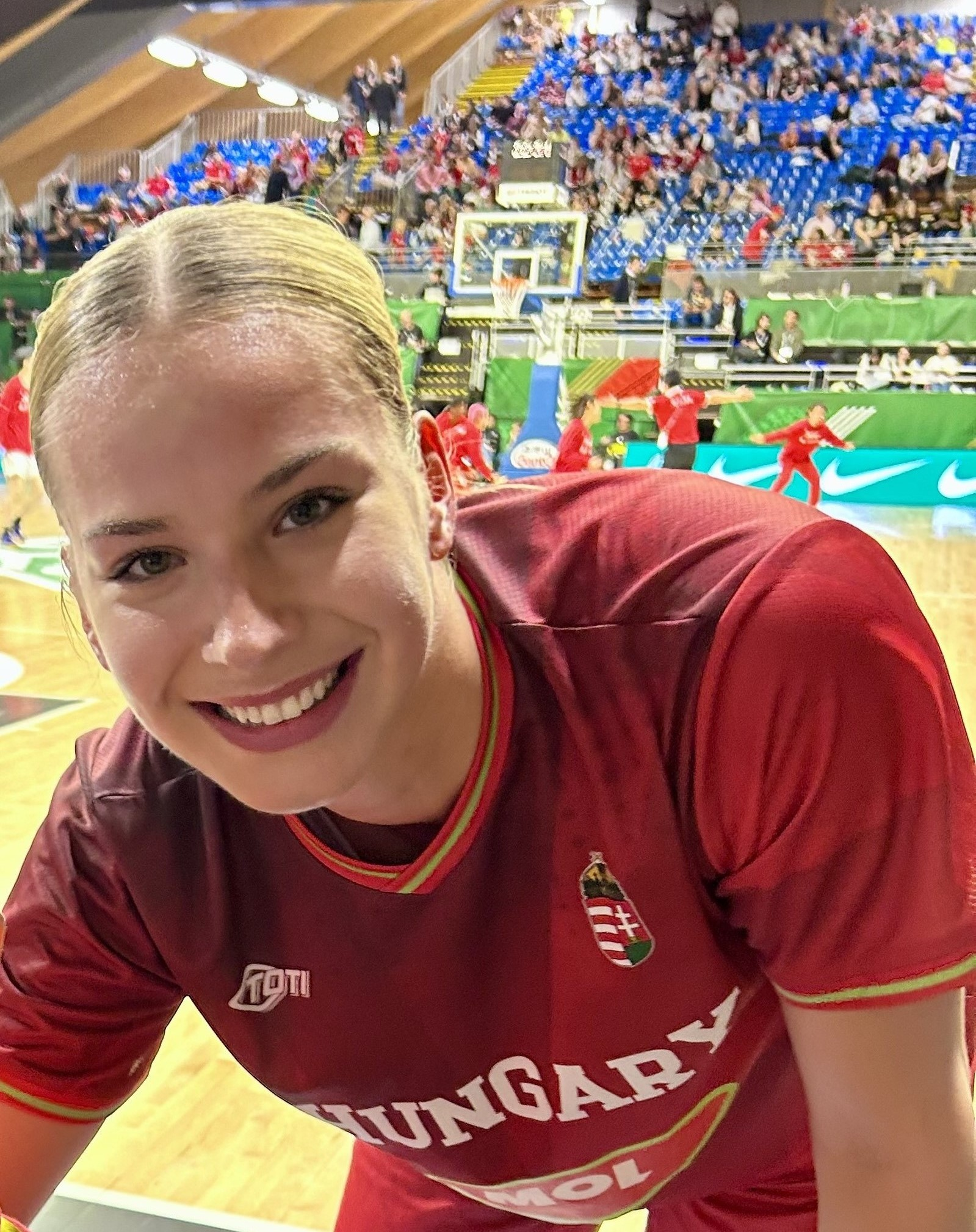
Dorka Juhász at FIBA Women's Olympic Qualifying Tournament in 2024

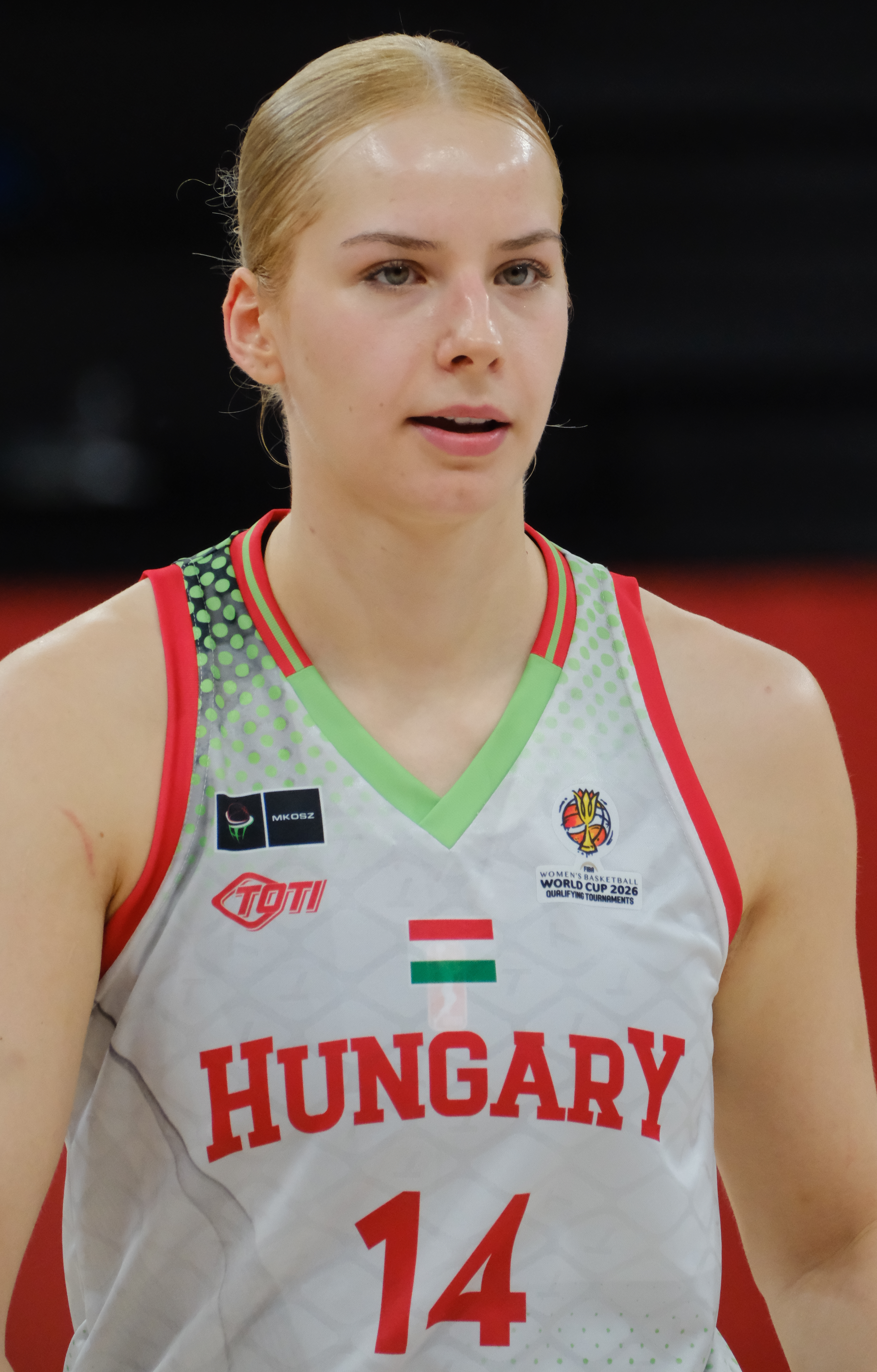
Juhász with the Hungarian national team in 2026

Dorka Juhász debuted in the Hungarian national team on 9 November 2023, when Hungary defeated Slovenia to 70–51. In February 2024, she played in the Sopron 2024 FIBA Olympic Qualifying Tournament. She averaged 11.7 points, 8 rebounds and 1.3 assists per game. Her efficiency per game was 15.7, which was the 3rd best performance in the tournament and she was selected as the All-Star 5.

== Career statistics ==
Legend
GP	Games played	GS	Games started	MPG	Minutes per game	RPG	Rebounds per game
APG	Assists per game	SPG	Steals per game	BPG	Blocks per game	PPG	Points per game
TO	Turnovers per game	FG%	Field-goal percentage	3P%	3-point field-goal percentage	FT%	Free-throw percentage
**Bold**	Career best	°	League leader

=== WNBA ===
==== Regular season ====
WNBA regular season statistics
Year	Team	GP	GS	MPG	FG%	3P%	FT%	RPG	APG	SPG	BPG	TO	PPG
2023	Minnesota	**38**	**27**	**24.2**	.472	.271	.540	**6.5**	**2.6**	**.9**	**.6**	1.2	**6.0**
2024	Minnesota	34	7	16.1	**.479**	**.324**	**.650**	3.8	1.1	.4	.4	**.6**	4.8
2025	Did not appear in league												
2026	Minnesota	21	0	15.2	.370	.288	.250	3.1	1.4	.2	.6	.7	3.6
**Career**	3 years, 1 team	93	34	19.2	.455	.291	.554	4.7	1.8	.6	.5	.9	5.0

==== Playoffs ====
WNBA playoff statistics
Year	Team	GP	GS	MPG	FG%	3P%	FT%	RPG	APG	SPG	BPG	TO	PPG
2023	Minnesota	3	**3**	**24.0**	.500	.000	.455	**5.0**	**2.7**	.7	.0	1.7	**5.0**
2024	Minnesota	**7**	0	5.7	**.600**	.000	**.500**	1.3	.6	.1	**.1**	.3	1.0
2026	Minnesota	2	0	9.5	.000	.000	—	.0	.5	**1.5**	.0	**.0**	.0
**Career**	3 years, 1 team	12	3	10.9	.500	.000	.462	2.0	1.1	.5	.1	.6	1.8

=== EuroLeague ===
EuroLeague statistics
Year	Team	GP	MPG	PPG	PTS	RPG	APG	FGM-FGA	FG%	3PM-3PA	3P%	FTM-FTA	FT%
2023–24	Famila Basket Schio	13	23.6	8.2	107	7.0	1.3	3.3–8.4	.394	.5–2.2	.250	1.1–2.0	.538
2024–25	Famila Basket Schio	10	**25.4**	8.8	88	**8.4**	**1.7**	3.8-7.8	.487	.4–1.7	.235	.8–1.5	.533
2025–26	Galatasaray Cagdas Faktoring	**18**	24.0	**12.8**	**231**	8.0	1.3	**5.0–9.7**	**.520**	**.8–2.3**	**.366**	**1.9–3.2**	**.596**

=== College ===
NCAA statistics
Year	Team	GP	Points	FG%	3P%	FT%	RPG	APG	SPG	BPG	PPG
2018–19	Ohio State	27	317	.458	.254	**.629**	9.0	.8	1.2	.7	11.7
2019–20	Ohio State	31	410	.476	**.396**	.532	9.4	1.1	1.2	1.2	13.2
2020–21	Ohio State	17	248	.481	.203	.429	**11.1**	1.1	1.0	1.0	**14.6**
2021–22	UConn	**32**	234	.457	.313	.429	5.7	1.7	.5	.5	7.3
2022–23	UConn	29	**411**	**.503**	.289	.602	9.9	**3.2**	**1.5**	**1.4**	14.2
**Career**		136	1620	.477	.301	.567	8.8	1.6	1.1	1.0	11.9

== Personal life ==
Her mother is the former basketball player Hajnalka Balázs, who is a 125-time national team member, she won a bronze medal at the European Championship in 1991, three-time Hungarian Championship and three-time Hungarian Cup winner for PVSK.

In 2024, Juhász was selected for the Hungarian Forbes 30 under 30.
