= Jessica Shepard =

American basketball player (born 1996)

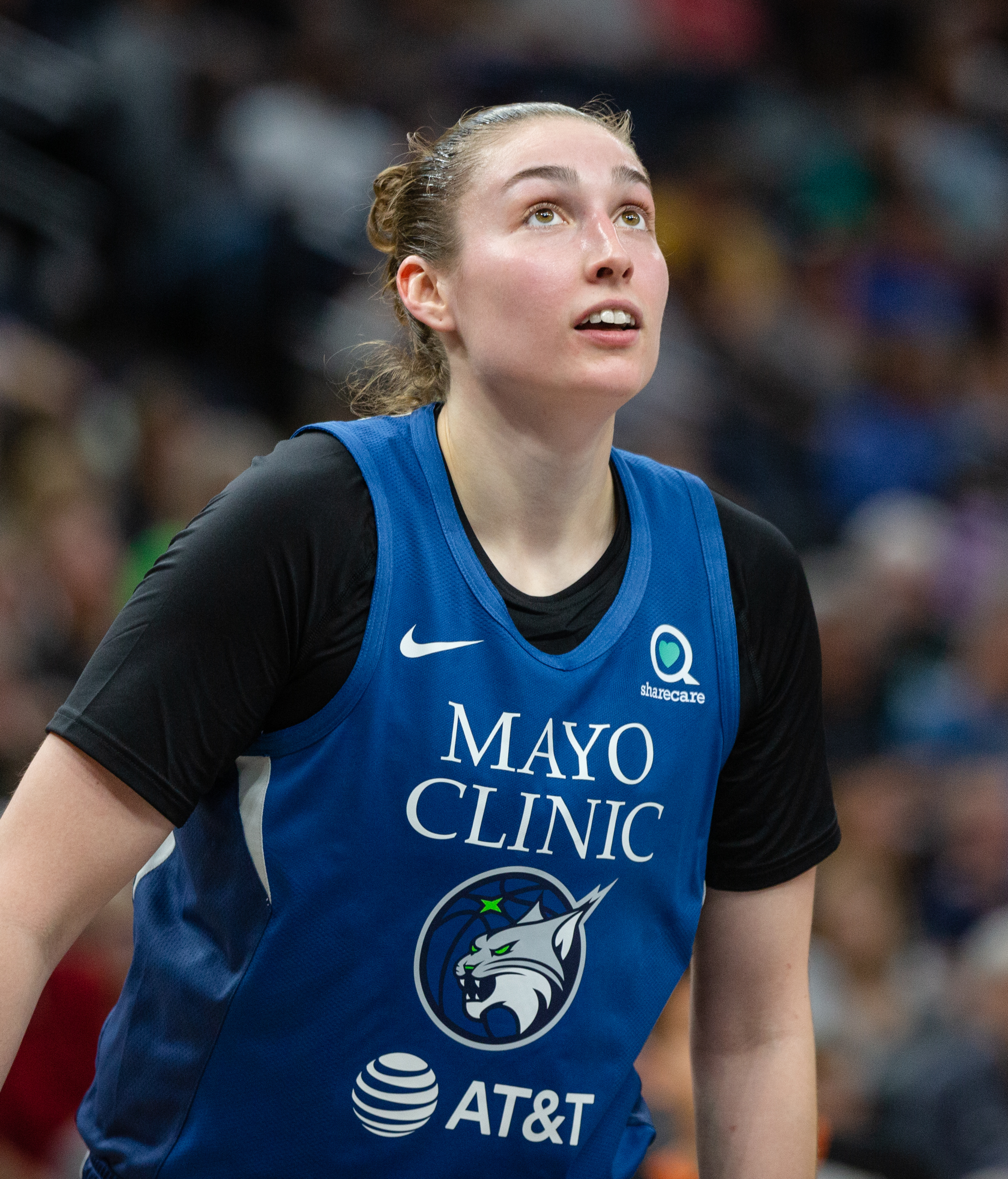
- Shepard with the Minnesota Lynx in 2019

No. 32 – Dallas Wings
- Position: Forward
- League: WNBA

Personal information
- Born: September 11, 1996 (age 30) Fremont, Nebraska, U.S.
- Listed height: 6 ft 4 in (1.93 m)
- Listed weight: 175 lb (79 kg)

Career information
- High school: Lincoln Southeast (Lincoln, Nebraska); Fremont (Fremont, Nebraska)
- College: Nebraska (2015–2017); Notre Dame (2017–2019)
- WNBA draft: 2019: 2nd round, 16th overall pick
- Drafted by: Minnesota Lynx
- Playing career: 2019–present

Career history
- 2019–2025: Minnesota Lynx
- 2021–2022: Dinamo Sassari
- 2022–2024: Reyer Venezia
- 2024–2025: Athinaikos
- 2025: PF Schio
- 2026–present: Dallas Wings

Career highlights
- WNBA Most Improved Player (2026); WNBA All-Star (2026); NCAA champion (2018); Lega Basket Femminile champion (2024); Third-team All-American – AP (2019); 2× First-team All-ACC (2018, 2019); First-team All-Big Ten (2016); Second-team All-Big Ten (2017); Big Ten Freshman of the Year (2016); Big Ten All-Freshman Team (2016)
- Stats at Basketball Reference
Medals
Women's Basketball
Representing United States
FIBA Under-18 Americas Championship
Gold medal – first place	2014 United States	Team

Jessica Shepard (born September 11, 1996) is an American-Slovenian professional basketball player for the Dallas Wings of the Women's National Basketball Association (WNBA), for Famila Basket Schio of the Lega Basket Femminile, and for the Laces of Unrivaled. Shepard began her college career at Nebraska, playing there for two seasons before transferring to Notre Dame to complete her career. She was drafted 16th overall by the Minnesota Lynx in the 2019 WNBA draft.

== Family and early years ==
A Fremont, Nebraska native, Shepard is the daughter of Mark and Kim Shepard. She has four sisters and one older brother. Shepard won a state title while attending Lincoln Southeast High School in 2013, and finished her high school career at Fremont.

== WNBA ==
=== Minnesota Lynx (2019–2025) ===
Shepard was selected 16th overall in the 2nd round of the 2019 WNBA Draft. Shepard appeared in 5 games of the 2019 season, and averaged 4.6 ppg. On June 8, 2019, in a game against the Los Angeles Sparks, it was determined Shepard had torn her ACL, effectively ending her rookie season.

Shepard missed the 2020 season as she continued to recover from her ACL injury that she sustained in 2019.

Shepard was suspended for and subsequently missed the entire 2024 season. This was due to contract commitments with her basketball club in Italy, Umana Reyer Venezia and violating the WNBA collective bargaining agreement, which requires players to prioritize the WNBA over other international leagues.

On April 21, 2025, Shepard re-signed with the Lynx. On August 22, in a 95–90 win over the Indiana Fever, she recorded a triple-double in just 21 minutes and 57 seconds of play, then the fastest in WNBA history. She finished the game with 22 points, 11 rebounds, and 11 assists, shooting 10-of-11 from the field. She also became the first player to record a triple-double while shooting over 90% from the field, and joined elite company as only the third player in WNBA history — alongside Alyssa Thomas and Sabrina Ionescu — to record 20+ points, 10+ rebounds, 10+ assists, and 0 turnovers in a single game. Her record for fastest triple-double stood for nineteen days before being surpassed by Alyssa Thomas on September 10, 2025.

=== Dallas Wings (2026–present) ===
Shepard signed a two-year deal with the Dallas Wings in April 2026 ahead of the 2026 WNBA season.

== National team career ==
On June 19, 2024, the Basketball Federation of Slovenia announced that Shepard had received Slovenian citizenship and became eligible to play for the Slovenia national team.

== WNBA career statistics ==
Legend
GP	Games played	GS	Games started	MPG	Minutes per game	RPG	Rebounds per game
APG	Assists per game	SPG	Steals per game	BPG	Blocks per game	PPG	Points per game
TO	Turnovers per game	FG%	Field-goal percentage	3P%	3-point field-goal percentage	FT%	Free-throw percentage
**Bold**	Career best	°	League leader

=== Regular season ===
Year	Team	GP	GS	MPG	FG%	3P%	FT%	RPG	APG	SPG	BPG	TO	PPG
2019	Minnesota	6	0	18.7	.379	.143	.750	5.7	**3.5**	0.3	0.2	2.5	4.8
2021	Minnesota	22	0	10.5	.364	.083	.750	3.2	1.7	0.1	0.2	**0.8**	2.0
2022	Minnesota	**36**	**22**	26.1	.500	**.250**	.734	**7.4**	3.0	0.4	**0.3**	1.7	**8.1**
2023	Minnesota	21	17	**26.9**	**.516**	.000	**.774**	7.0	3.1	**0.6**	0.1	1.4	**8.1**
2024	Did not appear in league												
2025	Minnesota	17	3	19.4	.595	0.0	574	6.8	2.5	0.5	0.1	1.5	7.1
Career	5 years, 1 team	102	42	21.4	.501	.178	.711	6.2	2.7	0.4	0.2	1.5	6.4

=== Playoffs ===
WNBA playoff statistics
Year	Team	GP	GS	MPG	FG%	3P%	FT%	RPG	APG	SPG	BPG	TO	PPG
2025	Minnesota	6	1	17.7	.444	.000	.875	5.0	1.8	0.7	—	1.0	5.2
**Career**	1 year, 1 team	6	1	17.7	.444	.000	.875	5.0	1.8	0.7	—	1.0	5.2

== Nebraska and Notre Dame statistics ==
Legend
GP	Games played	GS	Games started	MPG	Minutes per game	RPG	Rebounds per game
APG	Assists per game	SPG	Steals per game	BPG	Blocks per game	PPG	Points per game
TO	Turnovers per game	FG%	Field-goal percentage	3P%	3-point field-goal percentage	FT%	Free-throw percentage
**Bold**	Career best	°	League leader

Year	Team	GP	Points	FG%	3P%	FT%	RPG	APG	SPG	BPG	PPG
2015–16	Nebraska	31	574	51.0%	0.0%	58.1%	8.6	1.9	0.6	0.6	18.5
2016–17	Nebraska	29	538	40.8%	**31.5%**	55.7%	9.8	1.9	0.5	0.2	**18.6**
2017–18	Notre Dame	**38**	594	56.5%	0.0%	67.9%	8.1	2.4	0.8	**0.7**	15.6
2018–19	Notre Dame	**38**	**634**	**59.4%**	0.0%	**71.0%**	**10.3**	**3.3**	**1.4**	0.5	16.7
Career		136	2340	51.6%	29.5%	62.4%	9.2	2.4	0.9	0.5	17.2
