= Kayla Alexander =

Canadian basketball player (born 1991)

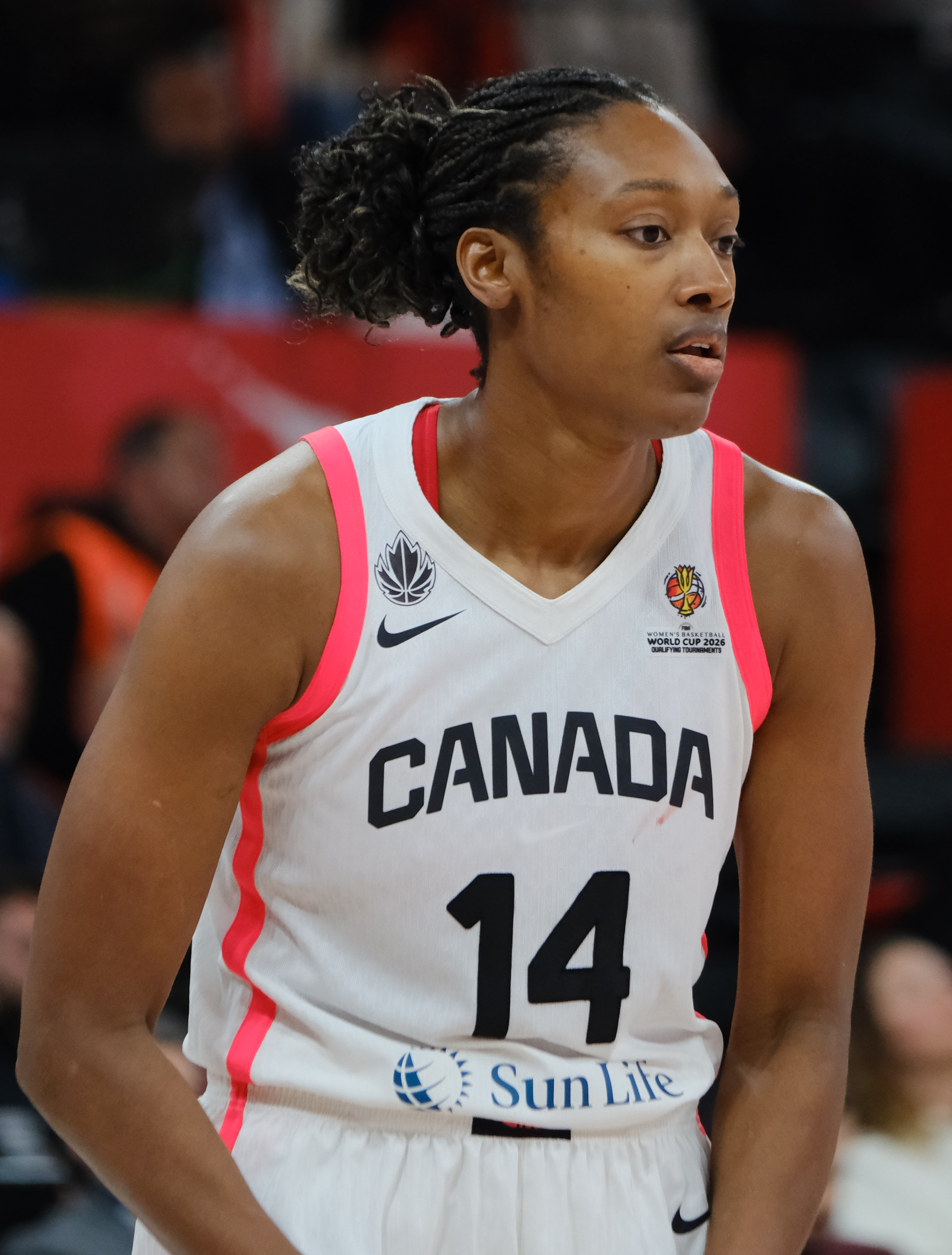

No. 40 – Azulmarino Mallorca Palma
- Position: Center
- League: LfB

Personal information
- Born: January 5, 1991 (age 35) Milton, Ontario, Canada
- Listed height: 6 ft 4 in (1.93 m)
- Listed weight: 186 lb (84 kg)

Career information
- High school: Milton District (Milton, Ontario)
- College: Syracuse (2009–2013)
- WNBA draft: 2013: 1st round, 8th overall pick
- Drafted by: San Antonio Silver Stars
- Playing career: 2013–present

Career history
- 2013–2017: San Antonio Stars
- 2015–2016: WBC Sparta&K
- 2016–2017: CJM Bourges Basket
- 2017–2018: Samsung Life Blueminx
- 2018: Indiana Fever
- 2018–2019: Adelaide Lightning
- 2019: Chicago Sky
- 2019–2020: Arka Gdynia
- 2020: Minnesota Lynx
- 2020–2021: BC Castors Braine
- 2021–2022: ASVEL Féminin
- 2022–2024: Tango Bourges Basket
- 2024–2026: Valencia Basket
- 2026: Toronto Tempo
- 2026-present: Azulmarino Mallorca Palma

Career highlights
- FIBA Europe SuperCup Women (2022); FIBA Europe SuperCup Women MVP (2022); Liga Femenina champion (2025); Liga Femenina Finals MVP (2025); Coupe de France (2024); Coupe de France MVP (2024); Honorable Mention All-American – AP (2013); 2x First-team All-Big East (2011, 2013); Second-team All-Big East (2012); Big East All-Freshman Team (2010)
- Stats at WNBA.com
- Stats at Basketball Reference
Medals
Women's basketball
Representing Canada
FIBA AmeriCup
| Silver medal – second place | 2019 Puerto Rico |
| Bronze medal – third place | 2023 León |
| Bronze medal – third place | 2025 Santiago |

Kayla Janine Alexander (born January 5, 1991) is a Canadian professional basketball player for Azulmarino Mallorca Palma of the Liga Femenina de Baloncesto. She played college basketball for the Syracuse Orange. After a successful career with the Orange, Alexander was drafted with the eighth overall pick in the 2013 WNBA draft by the San Antonio Stars.

== College career ==
Alexander played collegiately at Syracuse University from 2010 to 2013. After her four years, she was the school’s all-time leader in points (2,024), blocks (350), field goals (736), free throws made (552), free throws attempted (750) and games played (140). She became the second player from Syracuse to be selected in a WNBA draft.

Alexander's No. 40 jersey was retired by Syracuse University on December 8, 2024.

== WNBA career ==
Alexander was drafted eighth in the 2013 WNBA draft by the San Antonio Stars. Since her rookie season, she's been a reserve center on the Stars' roster and a key contributor in rebounding. In the 2016 season, she averaged career-highs in scoring and rebounding with 8.0 points per game and 4.5 rebounds per game. In 2017, Alexander re-signed with the Stars in free agency.

On February 1, 2018, Alexander was traded by the re-branded Las Vegas Aces along with a third-round pick in the 2019 WNBA Draft to the Indiana Fever in exchange for their second-round selection in the 2019 WNBA Draft.

On July 9, 2026, she signed a seven-day hardship contract with the Toronto Tempo. On July 16, 2026, she signed another seven-day contract with the Tempo. On July 23, 2026, she was released by the Tempo.

== Overseas career ==
In the 2015-16 WNBA off-season, Alexander played in Russia for WBC Sparta&K. In August 2016, Alexander signed a short-term deal with CJM Bourges Basket of the Ligue Féminine de Basketball for the 2016-17 WNBA off-season.

In early 2020, she signed with Arka Gdynia of the Basket Liga Kobiet, but returned to Canada that March due to the cancellation of the season at the onset of the COVID-19 pandemic.

On May 23, 2024, Alexander signed with Liga Femenina club Valencia, for the upcoming 2024–25 season.

On June 15, 2026, Alexander signed with Liga Femenina de Baloncesto club Azulmarino Mallorca Palma for the 2026-27 season.

== Personal life ==
Alexander said she wanted to become a teacher once she retires from basketball. Her brother, Kyle played for the Miami Heat.

In 2019, Alexander wrote and illustrated a children's book, The Magic of Basketball. Her sister, Kesia, is credited as co-author.

Alexander is a devout Christian and frequently posts about her faith on social media.

== Career statistics ==
Legend
| GP | Games played | GS | Games started | MPG | Minutes per game | RPG | Rebounds per game |
| APG | Assists per game | SPG | Steals per game | BPG | Blocks per game | PPG | Points per game |
| TO | Turnovers per game | FG% | Field-goal percentage | 3P% | 3-point field-goal percentage | FT% | Free-throw percentage |
| **Bold** | Career best | ° | League leader |

=== College ===
| Year | Team | GP | FG% | 3P% | FT% | RPG | APG | SPG | BPG | PPG |
|---|---|---|---|---|---|---|---|---|---|---|
| 2009-10 | Syracuse | 36 | 54.2% | **0.0%** | 70.1% | 4.8 | 0.1 | 0.6 | 1.9 | 10.8 |
| 2010-11 | Syracuse | 35 | **54.9%** | 0.0% | **76.6%** | 6.9 | 0.0 | **0.7** | 2.6 | 14.8 |
| 2011-12 | Syracuse | **37** | 49.5% | 0.0% | 74.7% | 7.5 | **0.3** | 0.6 | 2.6 | 14.8 |
| 2012-13 | Syracuse | 32 | 51.8% | 0.0% | 72.6% | **8.7** | 0.3 | 0.6 | **2.9** | **17.9** |
| Career | | 140 | 52.3% | 0.0% | 73.6% | 6.9 | 0.2 | 0.6 | 2.5 | 14.5 |

=== WNBA ===
==== Regular season ====
| Year | Team | GP | GS | MPG | FG% | 3P% | FT% | RPG | APG | SPG | BPG | TO | PPG |
|---|---|---|---|---|---|---|---|---|---|---|---|---|---|
| 2013 | San Antonio | 33 | 1 | 11.2 | .417 | .000 | .733 | 3.0 | 0.3 | 0.1 | 0.4 | 1.1 | 2.8 |
| 2014 | San Antonio | 33 | 0 | 9.0 | .434 | .000 | .839 | 2.0 | 0.2 | 0.1 | 0.3 | 0.7 | 2.8 |
| 2015 | San Antonio | 29 | 0 | 12.3 | .416 | .000 | .647 | 3.3 | 0.2 | 0.2 | **0.8** | 0.8 | 3.3 |
| 2016 | San Antonio | 25 | 0 | **19.6** | .546 | .000 | .754 | **4.5** | **0.5** | **0.4** | 0.5 | 1.1 | **8.0** |
| 2017 | San Antonio | **34** | **10** | 15.4 | .582 | .000 | **.909** | 3.1 | **0.5** | **0.4** | 0.5 | 0.9 | 6.2 |
| 2018 | Indiana | 30 | 0 | 8.6 | .541 | .000 | .824 | 2.2 | 0.2 | 0.1 | 0.3 | 0.6 | 2.7 |
| 2019 | Chicago | 3 | 0 | 6.7 | **.750** | .000 | .750 | 2.3 | 0.3 | 0.0 | 0.0 | 0.3 | 3.0 |
| 2020 | Minnesota | 16 | 0 | 5.6 | .533 | .000 | .625 | 0.9 | 0.2 | 0.1 | 0.2 | 0.4 | 2.3 |
| Career | 8 years, 4 teams | 203 | 11 | 11.8 | .508 | .000 | .763 | 2.8 | 0.3 | 0.2 | 0.4 | 0.8 | 4.0 |

==== Playoffs ====
| Year | Team | GP | GS | MPG | FG% | 3P% | FT% | RPG | APG | SPG | BPG | TO | PPG |
|---|---|---|---|---|---|---|---|---|---|---|---|---|---|
| 2014 | San Antonio | 1 | 0 | 1.0 | .000 | .000 | .000 | 0.0 | 0.0 | 0.0 | 0.0 | 0.0 | 0.0 |
| 2019 | Chicago | **2** | 0 | **1.5** | **1.000** | .000 | .000 | **1.0** | 0.0 | 0.0 | 0.0 | 0.0 | **2.0** |
| Career | 2 years, 2 teams | 3 | 0 | 1.9 | 1.000 | .000 | .000 | 0.7 | 0.0 | 0.0 | 0.0 | 0.0 | 1.3 |
