= Mariam Coulibaly =

Malian basketball player (born 1997)

Mariam Alou Coulibaly
No. 14 – Famila Basket Schio
- Position: Center

Personal information
- Born: 7 October 1997 (age 29) Bamako, Mali
- Listed height: 1.92 m (6 ft 4 in)

Career information
- WNBA draft: 2019: undrafted

Career history
- 2015–2017: CB Islas Canarias
- 2017–2019: Club Bàsquet Femení Sant Adrià
- 2019–2020: Landerneau Bretagne Basket
- 2020–2023: IDK Euskotren
- 2024–2025: Joventut Badalona
- 2025–2026: Uni Girona CB
- 2026–present: Famila Basket Schio
Medals
Women's basketball
Representing Mali
AfroBasket
Silver medal – second place	2021 Cameroon
Bronze medal – third place	2017 Mali
Bronze medal – third place	2019 Senegal
Bronze medal – third place	2023 Rwanda
AfroBasket U18
Gold medal – first place	2014 Mozambique
AfroBasket U16
Gold medal – first place	2013 Egypt

Mariam Alou Coulibaly (born 7 October 1997) is a Malian professional basketball player for Famila Basket Schio of the Italian Serie A1 and the Malian national team. Mariam is the younger sister of basketball player Naîgnouma Coulibaly, with whom she played for Mali at the 2017 FIBA Women's AfroBasket.

== Professional career ==
Coulibaly began her senior career in Spain, playing two seasons in Gran Canaria from 2015 to 2017 before joining Club Bàsquet Femení Sant Adrià, in Catalonia. She takes on a larger role, and in her second season there, averaged 12.4 points and 10.9 rebounds per game. She was twice named MVP of the week and finished as the leading rebounder in the Spanish top flight. In 2019 she moved to France with Landerneau Bretagne Basket, averaging 8.7 points and 5.7 rebounds in 15 games.

She returned to Spain in 2020 with IDK Euskotren, where she spent three seasons and made her EuroCup Women debut in 2022–23, averaging 14.8 points and 5.5 rebounds in six games. For the 2024-2025 season, Mariam Coulibaly joined Joventut Badalona and led the LF Endesa in both scoring and rebounding, averaging a double-double with 22 points and 10.8 rebounds across 28 games during the regular season. In the summer of 2025 Coulibaly played for Panteras de Aguascalientes in the LNBP Femenil, averaging 22.2 points and 9.0 rebounds in the playoffs as the club won its first championship, beating Adelitas de Chihuahua 96–92 in game five of the final. The following season, she signed with Uni Girona CB, where she was named MVP of LF Endesa, selected to the league's first team and led the league in the regular season once again in scoring, averaging 17.4 points and 7.2 rebounds across 29 games. In the 2025–26 EuroLeague Women season, Coulibaly averaged 15.8 points and 7.2 rebounds per game, earning selection to the competition's All-Star Second Team. In 2026 she joined Famila Basket Schio.

== National team career ==
Coulibaly won the U16 AfroBasket with Mali in 2013. The following year she played at the 2014 FIBA U17 World Championship in the Czech Republic, averaging 8 points and 9 rebounds, and won the U18 AfroBasket. Aged 17, she averaged 11 points and 10 rebounds at the 2015 FIBA U19 World Championship in Russia.

At senior level, Coulibaly was selected for the 2017 FIBA Women's AfroBasket on home soil in Mali, averaging 6.8 points in 13.6 minutes as Mali finished third. She took bronze again at the 2019 FIBA Women's AfroBasket in Senegal, and reached the final of the 2021 FIBA Women's AfroBasket in Cameroon, where she was named to the tournament's all-star five. She finished third again at the 2023 Women's Afrobasket.
