= Julie Allemand =

Belgian basketball player (born 1996)

- Allemand with Fenerbahçe in 2026

No. 22 – Fenerbahçe
- Position: Point guard
- League: Turkish Super League; EuroLeague Women

Personal information
- Born: 7 July 1996 (age 30) Liège, Belgium
- Listed height: 5 ft 8 in (1.73 m)
- Listed weight: 152 lb (69 kg)

Career information
- WNBA draft: 2016: 3rd round, 33rd overall pick
- Drafted by: Indiana Fever
- Playing career: 2014–present

Career history
- 2014–2017: Castors Braine
- 2017–2020: ASVEL
- 2020: Indiana Fever
- 2020–2021: BLMA
- 2021–2024: ASVEL
- 2022: Chicago Sky
- 2024–present: Fenerbahçe
- 2025: Los Angeles Sparks
- 2026–present: Toronto Tempo

Career highlights
- WNBA All-Rookie Team (2020); EuroLeague champion (2026); EuroLeague Final Six MVP (2026); All-EuroLeague Team (2026); 2× FIBA Europe SuperCup Women champion (2024, 2026); EuroCup Women champion (2023); 2× Turkish Super League champion (2025, 2026); Turkish Cup winner (2026); 2× Turkish Presidential Cup champion (2024, 2025); 2× French League champion (2019, 2023); French Cup winner (2021); Match des Champions winner (2019); 3× Belgian League champion (2015–2017); 2× Belgian Cup winner (2015, 2017)
- Stats at Basketball Reference

Julie Allemand (born 7 July 1996) is a Belgian professional basketball player for the Toronto Tempo of the Women's National Basketball Association (WNBA) and for Fenerbahçe of the Turkish Women's Basketball Super League. In the 2016 WNBA draft, she was selected by the Indiana Fever in the third round. She was a Euroleague Women champion in 2026 and was named the Final Six MVP. She was a member of the Belgian national team that won the EuroBasket Women 2023 and EuroBasket Women 2025 championship.

== Career ==
=== WNBA career ===
==== Indiana Fever (2020) ====
Allemand was drafted by the Indiana Fever in the third round of the 2016 WNBA draft. She spent 2016–19 playing in Europe before joining the Fever for the 2020 season.

She had a successful rookie season, recording the second-most assists per game in the league (5.8). She was named to the 2020 AP All-Rookie team.

She sat out of the 2021 season, citing mental health struggles and burnout after the Olympics.

==== Chicago Sky (2022) ====
Ahead of the 2022 season, Allemand was traded to the Chicago Sky as part of a three-team deal.

Allemand opted out of the 2023 season to focus on her commitments with the Belgium national team.

==== Los Angeles Sparks (2025) ====
On 19 February 2024, Allemand was traded along with Li Yueru and a 2025 WNBA draft third-round pick to the Los Angeles Sparks in exchange for the eighth pick in the 2024 WNBA draft. She missed the 2024 season recovering from an injured right ankle.

On 7 August 2025, she recorded 10 points, 11 assists and 11 rebounds to become the 22nd player in WNBA history to record a triple-double.

==== Toronto Tempo (2026–present) ====
On 3 April 2026, Allemand was drafted second overall by the Toronto Tempo in the 2026 WNBA expansion draft.

=== Overseas career ===
She started her professional career with Castors Braine and played there between 2014 and 2017. She moved to France for ASVEL where she played between 2017–2020 and won Ligue Féminine in 2019. Then she transferred to BLMA for 2020–2021 season and won French Cup with them. Allemand transferred to ASVEL for second time in 2021, where she won the 2022–23 EuroCup Women championship and Ligue Féminine 2023.

==== Fenerbahçe (2024–present) ====
On 26 July 2024, Allemand signed a two-year contract with Fenerbahçe, becoming teammates with her compatriot Emma Meesseman.

On 3 October 2024, Fenerbahçe, the 2023–24 EuroLeague Women champion, and Beşiktaş, the 2023–24 EuroCup Women finalist, faced off in the FIBA Europe SuperCup Women. Fenerbahçe defeated their arch rival 79–63 in the match played in Basketball Development Center in Istanbul, securing their second consecutive FIBA Women's Super Cup title. Allemand made 7 points, 4 assists, 1 steal and 1 rebound performance.

She also won 2024-25 and 2025-26 Turkish Super League, 2025 and 2026 Turkish Cup, 2024 and 2025 Turkish Presidential Cup with Fenerbahçe in domestic level.

In April 2026, she recorded 12 points, four assists, one steal and two rebounds against Spar Girona in 2026 EuroLeague Women Final Six first match and helped Fenerbahçe Opet to the finals. In the final game, she had 12 points, 10 assists, three steals, and nine rebounds against Galatasaray Çağdaş Faktoring and won her first EuroLeague title; this performance led to Allemand winning the MVP of 2026 EuroLeague Final Six title.

=== International career ===
She participated at the 2018 and 2022 FIBA Women's Basketball World Cup. Allemand represented Belgium at the 2020 Summer Olympics. She missed the 2024 Summer Olympics due to injury. She was awarded as a member of the EuroBasket All-Star Five in 2021, 2023, 2025 with Belgium ending third in 2021, and winning the 2023 and 2025 tournaments.

== Career statistics ==
Legend
GP	Games played	GS	Games started	MPG	Minutes per game	RPG	Rebounds per game
APG	Assists per game	SPG	Steals per game	BPG	Blocks per game	PPG	Points per game
TO	Turnovers per game	FG%	Field-goal percentage	3P%	3-point field-goal percentage	FT%	Free-throw percentage
**Bold**	Career best	°	League leader

=== WNBA ===
==== Regular season ====
WNBA regular season statistics
Year	Team	GP	GS	MPG	FG%	3P%	FT%	RPG	APG	SPG	BPG	TO	PPG
2016	Did not appear in WNBA												
2017	Did not appear in WNBA												
2018	Did not appear in WNBA												
2019	Did not appear in WNBA												
2020	Indiana	22°	22°	**32.5**	.455	**.478**	.733	**4.5**	**5.8**	1.1	**.4**	2.6	**8.5**
2021	Did not play (contract suspended)												
2022	Chicago	25	4	16.1	.417	.290	**.833**	1.6	3.4	.6	.1	**1.3**	3.0
2025	Los Angeles	**34**	27	28.3	.440	.277	.789	3.7	5.0	**1.3**	.0	1.6	5.4
2026	Toronto	33	**31**	28.3	**.532**	.419	.714	3.2	5.5	**1.3**	**.4**	1.7	6.0
**Career**	4 years, 4 teams	114	84	26.4	.468	.379	.765	3.2	4.9	1.1	.2	1.8	5.6

==== Playoffs ====
WNBA playoff statistics
Year	Team	GP	GS	MPG	FG%	3P%	FT%	RPG	APG	SPG	BPG	TO	PPG
2022	Chicago	8	0	11.5	.500	.300	.500	.5	2.0	.3	.1	.5	2.5
**Career**	1 year, 1 team	8	0	11.5	.500	.300	.500	.5	2.0	.3	.1	.5	2.5

== Personal life ==
Allemand is openly lesbian.

== Honours ==
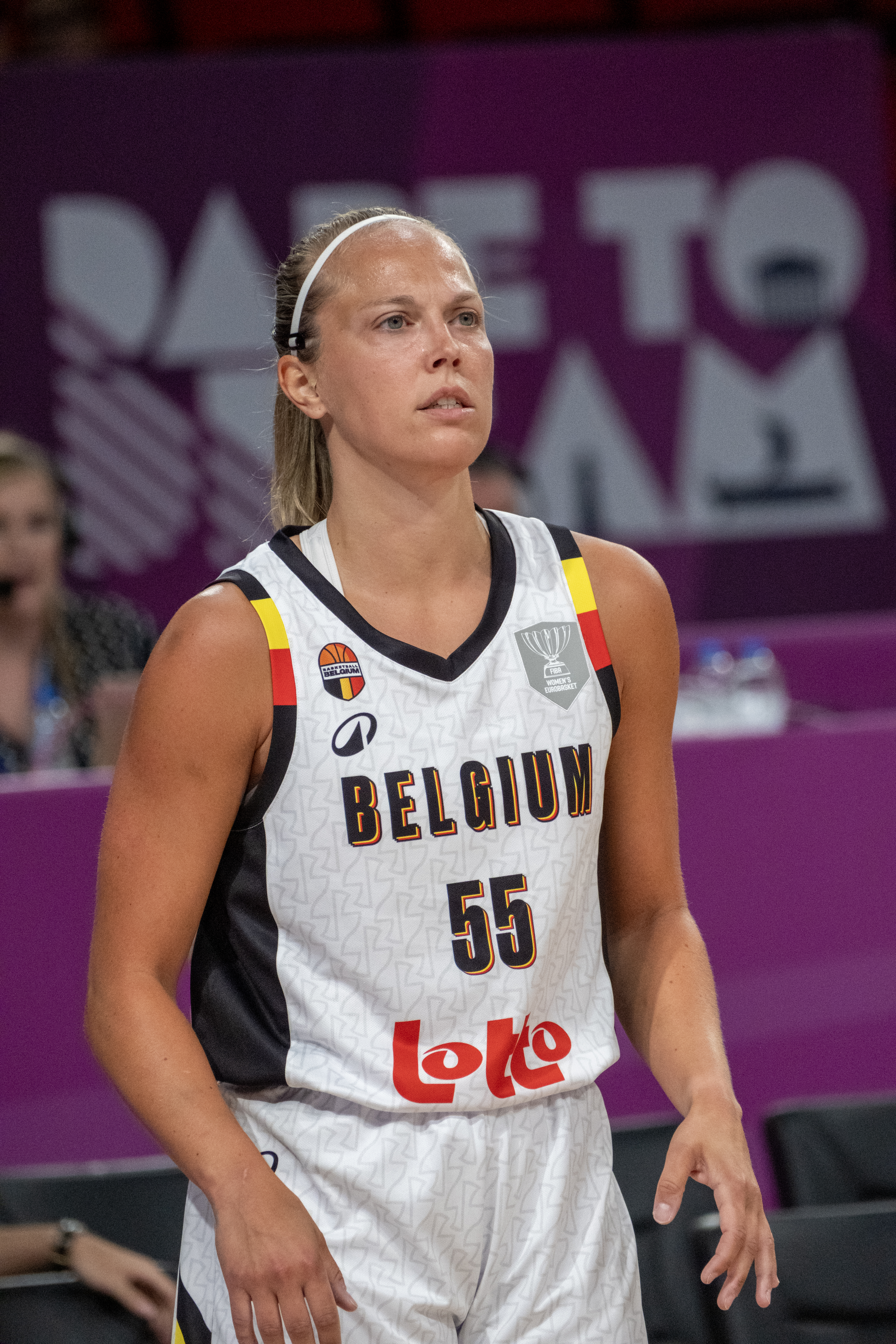
Allemand with Belgium during 2025 EuroBasket

=== Club ===
==== Castors Braine ====
- Belgian League: 2014–15, 2015–16, 2016-17
- Belgian Cup: 2015, 2017

==== ASVEL Féminin ====
- French League: 2019, 2023
- Match des Champions: 2019
- EuroCup Women: 2022–23

==== Montpellier ====
- French Cup: 2021

==== Fenerbahçe ====
- Euroleague Women: (gold) 2026, (bronze) 2025
- FIBA Europe SuperCup Women: 2024, 2026
- Turkish Super League: 2024-25, 2025-26
- Turkish Cup: 2025, 2026
- Turkish Presidential Cup: 2024, 2025

=== National team ===
- EuroBasket Women: (gold) 2023, 2025, (bronze) 2021
- Belgian Sports team of the Year: 2020, 2023, 2025

=== Individual ===
- European Youth Summer Olympic Festival FOJE Golden medal: 2011
- FIBA U16 Women's EuroBasket MVP: 2013
- Basketfeminin Belgian Promise: 2014
- Belgian Promise of the Year: 2015
- All-Star Five FIBA U20 EuroBasket: 2016
- Belgian Player of the Year: 2016
- French League All-Star Five: 2018–19, 2020–21
- WNBA All-Rookie Team: 2020
- All-Star Five EuroBasket: 2021, 2023, 2025
- MVP of 2026 EuroLeague Final Six
- 2026 EuroLeague Final Six MVP All Star Team
- 2026 All-EuroLeague Teams
- FIBA Women's Basketball World Cup All-time assists leader (111): 2026
