= Murjanatu Musa =

Nigerian basketball player

Murjanatu Liman Musa
- Musa with the Phoenix Mercury in 2025

No. 11 – Basket Landes
- Position: Center / Power forward
- League: Ligue Féminine de Basketball

Personal information
- Born: 5 May 2000 (age 26) Abuja, Nigeria
- Listed height: 6 ft 0 in (1.83 m)

Career information
- Playing career: 2018–present

Career history
- 2018–2019: Air Warriors
- 2021–2024: Celta Zorka Vigo
- 2024–2025: Tarbes Gespe Bigorre
- 2025: Phoenix Mercury
- 2025–present: Basket Landes
- Stats at Basketball Reference

Murjanatu Liman Musa (born 5 May 2000) is a Nigerian professional basketball player for Basket Landes of the Ligue Féminine de Basketball. She is also member of the Nigerian national team.

== Professional career ==
=== Nigeria ===
Murjanatu previously played for the Nigerian side Air Warriors. In the 2019 Zenith Women Basketball League, the team defeated Mountain of Fire Ministries in the final, with Musa scoring 17 points, 15 rebounds, and 3 assists. She was voted the MVP of the league.

=== Europe ===
Murjanatu joined Celta Zorka in Spain in 2021. In the 2022/23 season, She averaged 13.4 points, 13 rebounds and +22.7 efficiency, She also resigned with the team for the 2023/24 Season.

=== WNBA ===
==== Phoenix Mercury (2025) ====
On 5 March 2025, Musa signed a training camp contract with the Phoenix Mercury. Although she missed training camp as she was finishing her season in France, she still made the final Mercury roster. On 8 July, she was waived by the Mercury.

== National team career ==
Murjanatu represented Nigeria in the 3x3 basketball tournament at the 2019 Morocco Africa Games and 2019 African Beach Games, Cape-Verde, the team won Gold and Bronze respectively. Murjanatu Musa was called up to represent the D'Tigress and to participate in the Tokyo 2020 FIBA Women's Olympic Qualifying Tournaments in Belgrade. She also participated in the 2024 FIBA Women's Olympic Qualifying Tournaments where she averaged 7.7 points, 4.3 rebounds and 0.3 assists.

== Career statistics ==
Legend
GP	Games played	GS	Games started	MPG	Minutes per game	RPG	Rebounds per game
APG	Assists per game	SPG	Steals per game	BPG	Blocks per game	PPG	Points per game
TO	Turnovers per game	FG%	Field-goal percentage	3P%	3-point field-goal percentage	FT%	Free-throw percentage
**Bold**	Career best	°	League leader

=== WNBA ===
Stats current as of game on June 27, 2025

WNBA regular season statistics
Year	Team	GP	GS	MPG	FG%	3P%	FT%	RPG	APG	SPG	BPG	TO	PPG
2025	Phoenix	12	0	10.2	.457	.500	.636	2.6	0.6	0.3	0.2	0.6	3.3
**Career**	1 year, 1 team	12	0	10.2	.457	.500	.636	2.6	0.6	0.3	0.2	0.6	3.3
