= Merritt Hempe =

Macedonian basketball player (born 1994)

No. 5 – Casademont Zaragoza
- Position: Forward
- League: Liga Femenina de Baloncesto; EuroLeague Women

Personal information
- Born: July 27, 1994 (age 32) Fredericksburg, Virginia, U.S.
- Listed height: 6 ft 3 in (1.91 m)

Career information
- High school: Stafford (Fredericksburg, Virginia)
- College: Georgia (2012–2016)
- WNBA draft: 2016: undrafted
- Playing career: 2016–present

Career history
- 2016–2017: ChemCats Chemnitz
- 2017–2018: Kazanochka Kazan
- 2018–2019: Cadí La Seu
- 2019–2020: Mann-Filter Casablanca
- 2020–2021: Durán Maquinaria Ensino
- 2021–2022: Casademont Zaragoza
- 2022: USK Praha
- 2022–2023: Nesibe Aydın
- 2023–2024: Valencia Basket
- 2024–2025: Olympiacos
- 2025–present: Casademont Zaragoza

Merritt Ramona Hempe (born July 27, 1994) is an American-Macedonian basketball player for Casademont Zaragoza of the Liga Femenina de Baloncesto. Born in the United States, she represents the North Macedonia national team in international competitions.

== Professional career ==
Hempe played college basketball for the Georgia Lady Bulldogs at the University of Georgia from 2012 to 2016. In her senior season, she averaged 9.3 points and 6.1 rebounds per game.

After graduating in 2016, Hempe began her professional career with ChemCats Chemnitz in Germany. She subsequently played for Kazanochka Kazan in Russia before moving to Spain, where she joined Cadí La Seu for the 2018–19 season. She later played for Mann-Filter Stadium Casablanca and Durán Maquinaria Ensino.

In 2021, Hempe joined Casademont Zaragoza. During the 2021–22 season, she averaged 13.6 points and 5.3 rebounds per game in the league. In October 2022, she moved to Czech club USK Praha before joining Turkish side Nesibe Aydın the following month, where she also competed in the EuroCup Women.

In May 2023, Hempe signed with Valencia Basket. After one season in Valencia, she joined Olympiacos in June 2024. She won the Greek championship with Olympiacos in 2025 before returning to Casademont Zaragoza in April of that year.

In March 2026, Casademont Zaragoza announced that Hempe had extended her contract through the 2026–27 season.

== National team career ==
Hempe represents North Macedonia at international level. She made her debut in the national team during the qualifying campaign for EuroBasket Women 2023. She subsequently competed in the qualifying tournaments for EuroBasket Women 2025 and EuroBasket Women 2027.

== Career statistics ==
=== College ===
| Year | Team | GP | Points | FG% | 3P% | FT% | RPG | APG | SPG | BPG | PPG |
|---|---|---|---|---|---|---|---|---|---|---|---|
| 2012–13 | Georgia | 29 | 85 | .382 | .167 | .609 | 2.7 | 0.4 | 0.4 | 0.6 | 2.9 |
| 2013–14 | Georgia | 32 | 277 | .463 | .111 | .685 | 4.8 | 0.7 | 0.5 | 0.8 | 8.7 |
| 2014–15 | Georgia | 26 | 190 | .395 | .111 | .676 | 4.6 | 0.6 | 0.8 | 0.8 | 7.3 |
| 2015–16 | Georgia | 31 | 289 | .466 | .211 | .639 | 6.1 | 0.8 | 0.7 | 0.8 | 9.3 |
| Career | | 118 | 841 | .439 | .151 | .664 | 4.6 | 0.7 | 0.6 | 0.8 | 7.1 |
