= PF Schio =

Italian women's basketball team

Famila Basket Schio
- Leagues: Serie A1
- Founded: 1973
- Arena: PalaCampagnola
- Capacity: 2,800
- Location: Schio, Italy
- Team colors: Orange and white
- President: (Italy) Marcello Cestaro
- Head coach: (Greece) George Dikaioulakos
- Championships: 14 Scudettos; 17 Coppa Italias
- Website: https://www.familabasket.it/
Home	Away	Third

Pallacanestro Femminile Schio, also known as Beretta Famila Schio for sponsorship reasons, is an professional women's basketball team based in Schio, Italy. Schio is the most successful Italian women's basketball team, having won 14 league titles. They compete in the Serie A, and the EuroLeague.

== Team history ==
Founded in 1973, Schio enjoyed its first successes between 1996 and 2002, winning two national cups and the two last editions of the Ronchetti Cup in 2001 and 2002. In 2005 the team won its first national championship, which they successfully defended the following year, to attain its first double. In 2008 Schio won the EuroCup Women in addition to the national championship, and in 2011 it won its second national double. Schio has played in the EuroLeague Women since the mid-2000s, reaching the 2012 edition's Final Eight after beating defending champion Perfumerías Avenida.

The team's president since 1987 is Marcello Cestaro, owner of the supermarket chain Famila. The team is co-sponsored by sausage brand Fratelli Beretta.

== Honours ==
=== Domestic ===
- Serie A
  - Winners (12): 2004–05, 2005–06, 2007–08, 2010–11, 2012–13, 2013–14, 2014–15, 2015–16, 2017–18, 2018–19, 2021–22, 2022–23
- Coppa Italia
  - Winners (14): 1996, 1999, 2004, 2005, 2010, 2011, 2013, 2014, 2015, 2017, 2018, 2021, 2022, 2023
- Supercoppa Italiana
  - Winners (13): 2005, 2006, 2011, 2012, 2013, 2014, 2015, 2016, 2017, 2018, 2019, 2021, 2022

=== International ===
- Ronchetti Cup
  - Winners (2): 2000–01, 2001–02
- EuroCup Women
  - Winners (1): 2007–08

== Players ==
=== Current roster ===
Note: Flags indicate national team eligibility at FIBA-sanctioned events. Players may hold other non-FIBA nationalities not displayed.

Famila Basket Schio roster
Players
Coaches

Pos.	No.	Nat.	Name	Ht.	Age
G	1	(Belgium)	Mestdagh, Kim	1.80 m (5 ft 11 in)	36 – 12 March 1990
PG	7	(Italy)	Zanardi, Carlotta	1.80 m (5 ft 11 in)	21 – 15 March 2005
PG	8	(Italy)	Verona, Costanza	1.69 m (5 ft 7 in)	27 – 6 August 1999
SF	10	(Spain)	Conde, María	1.86 m (6 ft 1 in)	29 – 14 January 1997
G	11	(Italy)	Panzera, Ilaria	1.80 m (5 ft 11 in)	24 – 8 July 2002
C	14	(Mali)	Coulibaly, Mariam	1.90 m (6 ft 3 in)	29 – 7 October 1997
C	22	(Italy) (Angola)	Futo Andrè, Olbis	1.92 m (6 ft 4 in)	27 – 25 December 1998
SF	24	(Italy)	Zandalasini, Cecilia	1.86 m (6 ft 1 in)	30 – 16 March 1996
PF	25	(United States)	Bertsch, Morgan	1.90 m (6 ft 3 in)	29 – 20 April 1997
C	28	(Italy) (Nigeria)	Egwoh, Ashley	1.93 m (6 ft 4 in)	23 – 28 November 2002
PG	30	(Italy)	Attura, Beatrice	1.70 m (5 ft 7 in)	31 – 5 November 1994
PF	31	(Italy) (United States)	Keys, Jasmine	1.91 m (6 ft 3 in)	29 – 8 October 1997
SF	33	(Latvia)	Laksa, Kitija	1.82 m (6 ft 0 in)	30 – 5 June 1996

Head coach

- (Greece) George Dikeoulakos

Assistant coach(es)

- (Italy) Alessandro Fontana
- (Italy) Niccolò Turicci

Legend

- (C) Team captain
- Injured

- Roster
Updated: 6 October 2026
