= 2025–26 in Spanish basketball =

Basketball in Spain
- Season: 2025–26

Men's basketball
- Liga ACB: Valencia Basket
- Primera FEB: Monbus Obradoiro
- Segunda FEB: Coto Córdoba CB
- Copa del Rey: Kosner Baskonia
- Spain Cup: Movistar Estudiantes
- Supercopa: Valencia Basket

Women's basketball
- Liga Femenina: Valencia Basket
- Copa de la Reina: Valencia Basket
- Supercopa: Casademont Zaragoza

The 2025–26 season was the 90th season of competitive basketball in Spain.

== Promotion and relegation (pre-season) ==
=== Men's basketball ===
==== Liga ACB ====
▲ Promoted to league	▼ Relegated from league
Silbö San Pablo Burgos; ~~Real Betis Baloncesto~~ (Note: It did not fulfill the requirements to register the team in the league.)	~~Coviran Granada~~ (Note: It achieved a vacant berth after Real Betis Baloncesto did not fulfill the requirements to join the league.); Leyma Coruña

==== Primera FEB ====
▲ Promoted to league	▼ Relegated from league
Palmer Basket Mallorca Palma; Melilla Ciudad del Deporte; Fibwi Mallorca Bàsquet Palma	UEMC Real Valladolid Baloncesto; Amics Castelló; CB Naturavia Morón

==== Segunda FEB ====
▲ Promoted to league	▼ Relegated from league
Ciudad Molina Basket; CB Getafe; CB Zaragoza; LBC Cocinas.com; Círculo Gijón; Castillo de Gorraiz Valle de Egües	Ciudad de Huelva Emerita Resources; ~~Sol Gironés Bisbal Básquet~~ (Note: It swapped places with CB Prat.); Damex UDEA Algeciras; CB Santfeliuenc; Teknei Bizkaia Zornotza; Ibersol CB Tarragona
▲ Applied to participate	▼ Withdrawn from participation
CB Toledo (Note: It bought the place to CB L'Horta Godella.); Spanish Basketball Academy; Jaén Paraíso Interior CB	La Salud Archena (Note: It withdrawn from the league due to lack of funds.); CB Prat (Note: It swapped places with Sol Gironés Bisbal Básquet due to the end of collaboration with Joventut Badalona that joined to the Liga U.); CB L'Horta Godella (Note: It sold its place to CB Toledo due to the end of collaboration with Valencia Basket that joined to the Liga U.); Gran Canaria B (Note: It withdrawn from the league to participate in the Liga U.)

== National team ==
=== Spain men's national basketball team ===
==== 2027 FIBA Basketball World Cup qualification ====
===== First round =====
====== Group A ======
Pos	Team	Pld	W	L	PF	PA	PD	Pts	Qualification
1	Spain	6	5	1	526	427	+99	11	Second round
2	Ukraine	6	4	2	504	459	+45	10	Second round
3	Georgia	6	3	3	485	497	−12	9	Second round
4	Denmark	6	0	6	416	548	−132	6	

Source: FIBA
Rules for classification: 1) Points; 2) Head-to-head results; 3) Points difference; 4) Points scored.

27 November 2025	Denmark	64–74	Spain	Farum, Denmark
18:30	Scoring by quarter: 23–25, 10–20, 14–15, 17–14
	Pts: Jensen 20; Rebs: Larsen 8 Asts: Jensen, Pedersen 3 Eff: Jensen 17	Boxscore	Pts: Fernández 15; Rebs: Osobor, Paulí 8 Asts: Cárdenas 4 Eff: Osobor, Paulí 15	Arena: Farum Arena; Attendance: 2,630; Referees: Mārtiņš Kozlovskis (LAT), Michał Proc (POL), Blaž Zupančič (SLO)

30 November 2025	Spain	90–61	Georgia	La Laguna, Spain
19:45	Scoring by quarter: 19–22, 28–11, 23–13, 20–15
	Pts: Yusta 17; Rebs: Almansa 9 Asts: Yusta 6 Eff: Almansa 24	Boxscore	Pts: Khatiashvili, Shengelia 10; Rebs: Shengelia 7 Asts: Andronikashvili 4 Eff: Shermadini 13	Arena: Santiago Martín; Attendance: 4,603; Referees: Boris Krejić (SLO), Ventsislav Velikov (BUL), Siniša Prpa (SRB)

27 February 2026	Ukraine	66–86	Spain	Riga, Latvia
14:00	Scoring by quarter: 21–17, 12–15, 14–33, 19–21
	Pts: Kovliar 15; Rebs: three players 4 Asts: Zotov 5 Eff: Kovliar 14	Boxscore	Pts: Bassas, Cárdenas 16; Rebs: Almansa 7 Asts: Fernández 5 Eff: Fernández 15	Arena: Xiaomi Arena; Attendance: 605; Referees: Ademir Zurapović (BIH), Paulo Marques (POR), Edgard Ceccarelli (FRA)

2 March 2026	Spain	78–64	Ukraine	Oviedo, Spain
20:30	Scoring by quarter: 16–9, 12–12, 24–22, 26–21
	Pts: Alonso 12; Rebs: Oriola 8 Asts: Cárdenas 7 Eff: Paulí 13	Boxscore	Pts: Voinalovych 12; Rebs: Lypovyy, Shelist 5 Asts: Kovliar 5 Eff: Voinalovych 13	Arena: Palacio de los Deportes; Attendance: 5,261; Referees: Martin Vulić (CRO), Dariusz Zapolski (POL), Orhan Hekimoğlu (TUR)

2 July 2026	Spain	109–81	Denmark	Madrid, Spain
19:00	Scoring by quarter: 24–19, 27–22, 31–14, 27–26
	Pts: Oriola 20; Rebs: Oriola, Pradilla 6 Asts: Cárdenas 8 Eff: González, Oriola 23	Boxscore	Pts: Webb 14; Rebs: Webb 7 Asts: Heede-Andersen 6 Eff: Webb 17	Arena: Caja Mágica; Attendance: 6,685; Referees: Boris Krejić (SLO), Valerio Grigioni (ITA), Silvia Marziali (ITA)

5 July 2026	Georgia	91–89(OT)	Spain	Tbilisi, Georgia
17:30	Scoring by quarter: 14–32, 24–20, 19–19, 26–12, Overtime: 8–6
	Pts: Shengelia 37; Rebs: Shengelia 10; Asts: Reed 7 Eff: Shengelia 37	Boxscore	Pts: Hernangómez 19; Rebs: Hernangómez, Pradilla 8 Asts: Brizuela 4 Eff: Hernangómez 24	Arena: Otar Korkia and Nodar Jorjikia Tbilisi Sports Palace; Attendance: 8,000; Referees: Mārtiņš Kozlovskis (LAT), Josip Jurčević (CRO), Andrea Bongiorni (ITA)

===== Second round =====
====== Group I ======
Pos	Team	Pld	W	L	PF	PA	PD	Pts	Qualification
1	Ukraine	8	6	2	684	624	+60	14	2027 FIBA Basketball World Cup
2	Spain	8	5	3	721	630	+91	13	2027 FIBA Basketball World Cup
3	Georgia	8	5	3	684	661	+23	13	2027 FIBA Basketball World Cup
4	Portugal	8	4	4	670	636	+34	12	
5	Greece	8	4	4	617	596	+21	12	
6	Montenegro	8	4	4	574	633	−59	12	

Updated to game(s) played on 31 August 2026. Source: FIBA
Rules for classification: 1) Points; 2) Head-to-head results; 3) Points difference; 4) Points scored.

28 August 2026	Spain	89–95	Portugal	Zaragoza, Spain
21:00	Scoring by quarter: 14–21, 27–26, 30–24, 18–24
	Pts: Brizuela 19; Rebs: J. Hernangómez 7 Asts: Brizuela 5 Eff: Cárdenas 23	Boxscore	Pts: Williams 22; Rebs: Queta 9 Asts: Lisboa 4 Eff: Queta 22	Arena: Pabellón Príncipe Felipe; Attendance: 6,103; Referees: Gatis Saliņš (LAT), Juozas Barkauskas (LTU), Mehmet Şahin (TUR)

31 August 2026	Greece	108–106(OT)	Spain	Athens, Greece
18:00	Scoring by quarter: 19–20, 24–22, 24–16, 19–28, Overtime: 22–20
	Pts: Dorsey, Mitoglou 29; Rebs: Mitoglou 7 Asts: Calathes 8 Eff: Mitoglou 31	Boxscore	Pts: Parra 18; Rebs: Mara 13; Asts: Cárdenas 8 Eff: Mara 24	Arena: Telekom Center Athens; Attendance: 17,677; Referees: Wojciech Liszka (POL), Martin Vulić (CRO), Michał Proc (POL)

=== Spain women's national basketball team ===
==== Friendlies ====
14 November 2025	Spain	61–77	Italy	La Línea, Spain
18:45	Scoring by quarter: 10–24, 13–19, 17–18, 21–16
	Pts: Martín 11; Rebs: Ginzo 4 Asts: six players 2 Eff: Araújo, Martín 13	Report	Pts: Spreafico 18; Rebs: Verona 8 Asts: Verona 4 Eff: André 19	Arena: Municipal; Referees: Fernando Calatrava, Joaquín García, Sandra Sánchez

16 November 2025	Spain	68–72	France	La Línea, Spain
17:00	Scoring by quarter: 17–11, 20–14, 15–28, 16–19
	Pts: Martín 16; Rebs: Flórez 6 Asts: Ortiz 5 Eff: Martín 20	Report	Pts: Touré 14; Rebs: Badiane 9 Asts: four players 2 Eff: Touré 12	Arena: Municipal; Attendance: 1,002; Referees: Antonio Conde, Javier Torres, Sandra Sánchez

==== 2026 FIBA Women's Basketball World Cup Qualifying Tournaments ====
===== Tournament B =====
Pos	Team	Pld	W	L	PF	PA	PD	Pts	Qualification
1	United States (Note: The United States automatically qualified as 2025 FIBA Women's AmeriCup champions.)	5	5	0	479	269	+210	10	Final tournament
2	Italy	5	4	1	364	276	+88	9	Final tournament
3	Spain	5	3	2	400	305	+95	8	Final tournament
4	Puerto Rico (H)	5	2	3	274	368	−94	7	Final tournament
5	Senegal	5	1	4	240	380	−140	6	
6	New Zealand	5	0	5	253	412	−159	5	

Source: FIBA
(H) Hosts
Notes:

11 March 2026	Spain	99–50	New Zealand	San Juan, Puerto Rico
19:00	Scoring by quarter: 22–9, 25–13, 30–14, 22–14
	Pts: Gustafson 20; Rebs: Gustafson 6 Asts: three players 4 Eff: Gustafson 26	Boxscore	Pts: Tofaeono 14; Rebs: Pizzey, Tofaeono 7 Asts: Shearer 3 Eff: Tofaeono 21	Arena: José Miguel Agrelot Coliseum; Attendance: 32; Referees: Boris Krejić (SLO), Aline García (URU), Yann Davidson (MAD)

12 March 2026	Senegal	51–84	Spain	San Juan, Puerto Rico
19:00	Scoring by quarter: 13–25, 8–17, 13–30, 17–12
	Pts: Kané 12; Rebs: Faye 10; Asts: Kané, N. Ndiaye 3 Eff: Faye, Kané 15	Boxscore	Pts: Martín 16; Rebs: Gustafson 11; Asts: Cazorla 8 Eff: Martín 22	Arena: José Miguel Agrelot Coliseum; Attendance: 36; Referees: Mihkel Männiste (EST), Yann Davidson (MAD), Alan dos Santos (BRA)

15 March 2026	Spain	91–52	Puerto Rico	San Juan, Puerto Rico
1:00	Scoring by quarter: 31–17, 22–6, 22–11, 16–18
	Pts: Gustafson 21; Rebs: Martín 7 Asts: Ortiz 6 Eff: Gustafson 20	Boxscore	Pts: San Antonio 11; Rebs: Satterfield 8 Asts: four players 2 Eff: Gonzalez 9	Arena: José Miguel Agrelot Coliseum; Attendance: 3,743; Referees: Viola Györgyi (NOR), Yann Davidson (MAD), Kevin Lei (CAN)

15 March 2026	Italy	68–56	Spain	San Juan, Puerto Rico
22:00	Scoring by quarter: 15–13, 13–13, 19–17, 21–13
	Pts: Zandalasini 22; Rebs: Cubaj 8 Asts: Santucci 6 Eff: Zandalasini 17	Boxscore	Pts: Gustafson 12; Rebs: Buenavida, Gustafson 6 Asts: Conde, Martín 4 Eff: Gustafson 15	Arena: José Miguel Agrelot Coliseum; Attendance: 393; Referees: James Griguol (AUS), Aline García (URU), Sun Jian (CHN)

17 March 2026	Spain	70–84	United States	San Juan, Puerto Rico
22:00	Scoring by quarter: 16–21, 16–23, 15–17, 23–23
	Pts: Carrera, Gustafson 15; Rebs: Fam 5 Asts: Martín 6 Eff: Carrera 17	Boxscore	Pts: Copper 20; Rebs: Reese 8 Asts: Clark 7 Eff: Hamby 23	Arena: José Miguel Agrelot Coliseum; Attendance: 1,827; Referees: James Griguol (AUS), Yann Davidson (MAD), Ritvars Helmšteins (LAT)

==== Friendlies ====
15 August 2026	Germany	60–65	Spain	Ludwigsburg, Germany
19:00	Scoring by quarter: 13–11, 14–18, 18–15, 15–21
		Report		Arena: MHPArena Ludwigsburg

21 August 2026	Spain	83–58	Nigeria	La Laguna, Spain
21:00	Scoring by quarter: 14–20, 22–20, 27–9, 20–9
		Report		Arena: Santiago Martín

23 August 2026	Spain	95–67	Belgium	La Laguna, Spain
21:00	Scoring by quarter: 25–16, 20–26, 31–16, 19–9
		Report		Arena: Santiago Martín

29 August 2026	Spain	97–58	Mali	Zaragoza, Spain
20:00	Scoring by quarter: 25–14, 25–12, 25–19, 22–13
		Report		Arena: Pabellón Príncipe Felipe

30 August 2026	Spain	72–71	China	Zaragoza, Spain
21:00	Scoring by quarter: 18–12, 17–20, 13–13, 24–26
		Report		Arena: Pabellón Príncipe Felipe

==== 2026 FIBA Women's Basketball World Cup ====
===== Group A =====
Pos	Team	Pld	W	L	PF	PA	PD	Pts	Qualification
1	Spain	3	2	1	235	194	+41	5 (Note: Spain 83–53 Germany)	Quarterfinals
2	Germany (H)	3	2	1	210	199	+11	5	Qualification to quarterfinals
3	Japan	3	1	2	219	250	−31	4 (Note: Japan 102–97 Mali)	Qualification to quarterfinals
4	Mali	3	1	2	237	258	−21	4	

Source: FIBA
Rules for classification: 1) Points; 2) Head-to-head results; 3) Points difference; 4) Points scored.
(H) Hosts
Notes:

4 September 2026	Spain	83–53	Germany	Berlin, Germany
17:45	Scoring by quarter: 24–13, 26–11, 15–15, 18–14
	Pts: Fam 17; Rebs: Carrera 10; Asts: Flórez 5 Eff: Fam 25	Boxscore	Pts: Fiebich 13; Rebs: Sabally 7 Asts: Geiselsöder, Wilke 2 Eff: Gülich 11	Arena: Berlin Arena; Attendance: 12,550; Referees: Johnny Batista (PUR), Martin Vulić (CRO), Waseem Husainy (CAN)

5 September 2026	Mali	82–73	Spain	Berlin, Germany
11:30	Scoring by quarter: 19–17, 13–17, 31–19, 19–20
	Pts: Koné, N'Diaye 19; Rebs: Koné 10; Asts: Doumbia 9 Eff: Koné 23	Boxscore	Pts: Martín 20; Rebs: Carrera 7 Asts: Martín 4 Eff: Martín 21	Arena: Max-Schmeling-Halle; Attendance: 3,523; Referees: Ruben Woolcock (AUS), Waseem Husainy (CAN), Yann Davidson (MAD)

7 September 2026	Japan	59–79	Spain	Berlin, Germany
17:50	Scoring by quarter: 15–23, 21–16, 12–18, 11–22
	Pts: Tanaka 15; Rebs: Miyazawa 8 Asts: Machida 4 Eff: Miyazawa 13	Boxscore	Pts: Martín 20; Rebs: Fam 10; Asts: Cazorla 5 Eff: Martín 20	Arena: Max-Schmeling-Halle; Attendance: 2,717; Referees: Johnny Batista (PUR), Julirys Guzmán (PUR), Blanca Burns (USA)

===== Knockout phase =====
10 September 2026 QF	Australia	66–89	Spain	Berlin, Germany
20:45	Scoring by quarter: 17–31, 20–27, 14–12, 15–19
	Pts: Bibby, Wilson 13; Rebs: Talbot 11; Asts: Talbot 7 Eff: Talbot 23	Boxscore	Pts: Gustafson 16; Rebs: Fam 8 Asts: Cazorla 5 Eff: Florez 17	Arena: Berlin Arena; Attendance: 8,619; Referees: Wojciech Liszka (POL), Gatis Saliņš (LAT), Martin Vulić (CRO)

12 September 2026 SF	Spain	66–76	United States	Berlin, Germany
20:00	Scoring by quarter: 18–21, 18–18, 22–19, 8–18
	Pts: Conde, Martín 17; Rebs: Fam 7 Asts: Cazorla 5 Eff: Martín 19	Boxscore	Pts: Stewart 16; Rebs: Boston 7 Asts: Young 4 Eff: Stewart 20	Arena: Berlin Arena; Attendance: 12,650; Referees: Julio Anaya (PAN), Takaki Kato (JPN), Ruben Woolcock (AUS)

13 September 2026 3rd	Spain	81–58	Germany	Berlin, Germany
16:30	Scoring by quarter: 25–15, 15–21, 21–15, 20–7
	Pts: Martín 22; Rebs: Fam 9 Asts: Martín 9 Eff: Martín 28	Boxscore	Pts: Peterson, Sabally 13; Rebs: Fiebich 7 Asts: Gülich 3 Eff: Sabally 15	Arena: Berlin Arena; Attendance: 12,187; Referees: Yohan Rosso (FRA), Julirys Guzmán (PUR), Blanca Burns (USA)

== Worldwide competitions ==
=== FIBA Intercontinental Cup ===
==== Group stage ====
Pos	Team	Pld	W	L	PF	PA	PD	Pts	Qualification
1	(Spanish Basketball Federation) Unicaja	2	2	0	170	129	+41	4	Advance to final
2	(Libyan Arab Basketball Federation) Al Ahli Tripoli	2	1	1	148	151	−3	3	Qualification to third place game
3	(Japan Basketball Association) Utsunomiya Brex	2	0	2	146	184	−38	2	Qualification to fifth place game

Source: FIBA

18 September 2025	Al Ahli Tripoli (Libyan Arab Basketball Federation)	61–73	(Spanish Basketball Federation) Unicaja	Singapore
14:00	Scoring by quarter: 10–16, 18–18, 15–21, 18–18
	Pts: Almeida 21; Rebs: Almeida 9 Asts: Badrush 3 Eff: Almeida 23	Boxscore	Pts: Pérez 16; Rebs: Díaz 6 Asts: three players 4 Eff: Kalinoski 16	Arena: Singapore Indoor Stadium; Attendance: 1,783; Referees: Roberto Vázquez (PUR), Yann Vézo Davidson (MAD), Carlos Vélez (COL)

19 September 2025	Utsunomiya Brex (Japan Basketball Association)	68–97	(Spanish Basketball Federation) Unicaja	Singapore
14:00	Scoring by quarter: 20–23, 13–18, 20–35, 15–21
	Pts: Newbill 21; Rebs: Newbill 8 Asts: Newbill 8 Eff: Newbill 27	Boxscore	Pts: Kalinoski 19; Rebs: Kravish 6 Asts: Perry 8 Eff: Kalinoski 23	Arena: Singapore Indoor Stadium; Attendance: 2,871; Referees: Mārtiņš Kozlovskis (LAT), Yener Yılmaz (TUR), Waseem Husainy (CAN)

==== Final ====
21 September 2025	Unicaja (Spanish Basketball Federation)	71–61	(USA Basketball) NBA G League United	Singapore
13:00	Scoring by quarter: 11–21, 22–15, 23–5, 15–20
	Pts: Tillie 14; Rebs: Webb 8 Asts: Perry 5 Eff: Perry 15	Boxscore	Pts: Shackelford 17; Rebs: Hunt 11; Asts: Hunt 3 Eff: Hunt 11	Arena: Singapore Indoor Stadium; Attendance: 6,217; Referees: Mārtiņš Kozlovskis (LAT), James Griguol (AUS), Yann Vézo Davidson (MAD)

== European competitions ==
=== EuroLeague ===
==== Regular season ====
Pos	Team	Pld	W	L	PF	PA	PD	Qualification
1	(Hellenic Basketball Federation) Olympiacos	38	26	12	3406	3144	+262	Qualification to playoffs
2	(Spanish Basketball Federation) Valencia Basket	38	25	13	3418	3243	+175	Qualification to playoffs
3	(Spanish Basketball Federation) Real Madrid	38	24	14	3342	3156	+186	Qualification to playoffs
4	(Turkish Basketball Federation) Fenerbahçe Beko	38	24	14	3114	3061	+53	Qualification to playoffs
5	(Lithuanian Basketball Federation) Žalgiris	38	23	15	3304	3125	+179	Qualification to playoffs
6	(Israeli Basketball Association) Hapoel IBI Tel Aviv	38	23	15	3329	3211	+118	Qualification to playoffs
7	(Hellenic Basketball Federation) Panathinaikos AKTOR	38	22	16	3314	3228	+86	Qualification to play-in
8	(French Federation of Basketball) Monaco	38	22	16	3417	3282	+135	Qualification to play-in
9	(Spanish Basketball Federation) Barcelona	38	21	17	3167	3147	+20	Qualification to play-in
10	(Basketball Federation of Serbia) Crvena zvezda Meridianbet	38	21	17	3287	3245	+42	Qualification to play-in
11	(United Arab Emirates Basketball Association) Dubai Basketball	38	19	19	3324	3325	−1	
12	(Israeli Basketball Association) Maccabi Rapyd Tel Aviv	38	18	20	3386	3486	−100	
13	(German Basketball Federation) Bayern Munich	38	17	21	3063	3168	−105	
14	(Italian Basketball Federation) EA7 Emporio Armani Milan	38	17	21	3246	3294	−48	
15	(Basketball Federation of Serbia) Partizan Mozzart Bet	38	16	22	3052	3242	−190	
16	(French Federation of Basketball) Paris Basketball	38	15	23	3422	3456	−34	
17	(Italian Basketball Federation) Virtus Bologna	38	14	24	3110	3285	−175	
18	(Spanish Basketball Federation) Kosner Baskonia	38	13	25	3321	3483	−162	
19	(Turkish Basketball Federation) Anadolu Efes	38	12	26	2991	3151	−160	
20	(French Federation of Basketball) LDLC ASVEL	38	8	30	2989	3270	−281	

Source: EuroLeague
Rules for classification: Regular season tiebreakers

==== Play-in ====
Team 1	Score	Team 2
Play-in B
Barcelona (Spanish Basketball Federation)	80–72	(Basketball Federation of Serbia) Crvena zvezda Meridianbet
Play-in C
Monaco (French Federation of Basketball)	79–70	(Spanish Basketball Federation) Barcelona

==== Playoffs ====
Team 1	Series	Team 2	Game 1	Game 2	Game 3	Game 4	Game 5
Valencia Basket (Spanish Basketball Federation)	3–2	(Hellenic Basketball Federation) Panathinaikos AKTOR	67–68	105–107	91–87	89–86	81–64
Real Madrid (Spanish Basketball Federation)	3–1	(Israeli Basketball Association) Hapoel IBI Tel Aviv	86–82	102–75	69–76	87–81	—

==== Final Four ====
Team 1	Score	Team 2
Semifinals
Valencia Basket (Spanish Basketball Federation)	90–105	(Spanish Basketball Federation) Real Madrid
Championship game
Olympiacos (Hellenic Basketball Federation)	92–85	(Spanish Basketball Federation) Real Madrid

=== EuroCup ===
==== Regular season ====
===== Group A =====
Pos	Team	Pld	W	L	PF	PA	PD	Qualification
1	(Israeli Basketball Association) Hapoel Midtown Jerusalem	18	13	5	1702	1506	+196	Advance to quarterfinals
2	(Turkish Basketball Federation) Bahçeşehir Koleji	18	12 (Note: Bahçeşehir Koleji 159–135 Cedevita Olimpija)	6	1593	1475	+118	Advance to quarterfinals
3	(Basketball Federation of Slovenia) Cedevita Olimpija	18	12	6	1596	1413	+183	Advance to eighthfinals
4	(Italian Basketball Federation) Umana Reyer Venezia	18	11 (Note: Umana Reyer Venezia 188–168 Baxi Manresa)	7	1593	1538	+55	Advance to eighthfinals
5	(Spanish Basketball Federation) Baxi Manresa	18	11	7	1624	1619	+5	Advance to eighthfinals
6	(Romanian Basketball Federation) U-BT Cluj-Napoca	18	9	9	1714	1657	+57	Advance to eighthfinals
7	(Hellenic Basketball Federation) Aris Betsson	18	8	10	1500	1593	−93	
8	(Lithuanian Basketball Federation) Neptūnas	18	7	11	1637	1725	−88	
9	(Polish Basketball Federation) Śląsk Wrocław	18	5	13	1516	1680	−164	
10	(German Basketball Federation) Veolia Towers Hamburg	18	2	16	1472	1741	−269	

Source: EuroCup
Rules for classification: All points scored in extra period(s) will not be counted in the standings, nor for any tie-break situation.

==== Playoffs ====
Team 1	Score	Team 2
Eighthfinals
Türk Telekom (Turkish Basketball Federation)	98–81	(Spanish Basketball Federation) Baxi Manresa

=== Champions League ===
==== Qualifying rounds ====
Team 1	Score	Team 2
Quarter-finals
UCAM Murcia (Spanish Basketball Federation)	100–84	(Polish Basketball Federation) PGE Start Lublin
Semi-finals
UCAM Murcia (Spanish Basketball Federation)	81–71	(Lithuanian Basketball Federation) Juventus
Final
UCAM Murcia (Spanish Basketball Federation)	88–96	(French Federation of Basketball) Élan Chalon

==== Regular season ====
===== Group C =====
Pos	Team	Pld	W	L	PF	PA	PD	Pts	Qualification
1	(Spanish Basketball Federation) Joventut Badalona	6	6	0	531	455	+76	12	Advance to round of 16
2	(French Federation of Basketball) Cholet	6	3	3	539	524	+15	9	Advance to play-ins
3	(Israeli Basketball Association) Hapoel Netanel Holon	6	3	3	531	521	+10	9	Advance to play-ins
4	(Turkish Basketball Federation) Bursaspor	6	0	6	441	542	−101	6	

Source: FIBA

===== Group D =====
Pos	Team	Pld	W	L	PF	PA	PD	Pts	Qualification
1	(Spanish Basketball Federation) La Laguna Tenerife	6	4	2	519	474	+45	10	Advance to round of 16
2	(Turkish Basketball Federation) Tofaş	6	3	3	495	511	−16	9	Advance to play-ins
3	(Italian Basketball Federation) Trapani Shark	6	3	3	521	516	+5	9	Advance to play-ins
4	(Israeli Basketball Association) Bnei Penlink Herzliya	6	2	4	509	543	−34	8	

Source: FIBA

===== Group G =====
Pos	Team	Pld	W	L	PF	PA	PD	Pts	Qualification
1	(Spanish Basketball Federation) Unicaja	6	6	0	575	435	+140	12	Advance to round of 16
2	(Turkish Basketball Federation) Mersin	6	4	2	415	404	+11	10	Advance to play-ins
3	(Hellenic Basketball Federation) Karditsa Iaponiki	6	2	4	461	519	−58	8	Advance to play-ins
4	(Basketball Belgium) Filou Oostende	6	0	6	563	656	−93	6	

Source: FIBA

===== Group H =====
Pos	Team	Pld	W	L	PF	PA	PD	Pts	Qualification
1	(Spanish Basketball Federation) Dreamland Gran Canaria	6	6	0	518	425	+93	12	Advance to round of 16
2	(Basketball Federation of Serbia) Spartak Office Shoes	6	3	3	469	462	+7	9	Advance to play-ins
3	(French Federation of Basketball) Le Mans	6	2	4	484	460	+24	8	Advance to play-ins
4	(Portuguese Basketball Federation) Benfica	6	1	5	429	553	−124	7	

Source: FIBA

==== Round of 16 ====
===== Group K =====
Pos	Team	Pld	W	L	PF	PA	PD	Pts	Qualification
1	(Spanish Basketball Federation) Unicaja	6	4	2	504	462	+42	10	Advance to quarter-finals
2	(Spanish Basketball Federation) Joventut Badalona	6	4	2	505	479	+26	10	Advance to quarter-finals
3	(French Federation of Basketball) Élan Chalon	6	2	4	479	534	−55	8	
4	(German Basketball Federation) Fitness First Würzburg Baskets	6	2	4	491	504	−13	8	

Source: Round of 16 Standings

===== Group L =====
Pos	Team	Pld	W	L	PF	PA	PD	Pts	Qualification
1	(Spanish Basketball Federation) La Laguna Tenerife	6	4	2	482	447	+35	10	Advance to quarter-finals
2	(Czech Basketball Federation) ERA Nymburk	6	3	3	464	483	−19	9	Advance to quarter-finals
3	(Spanish Basketball Federation) Dreamland Gran Canaria	6	3	3	462	452	+10	9	
4	(Italian Basketball Federation) Pallacanestro Trieste	6	2	4	472	498	−26	8	

Source: Round of 16 Standings

==== Playoffs ====
Team 1	Series	Team 2	1st leg	2nd leg	3rd leg
AEK (Hellenic Basketball Federation)	2–1	(Spanish Basketball Federation) Asisa Joventut	87–84	66–88	72–67
La Laguna Tenerife (Spanish Basketball Federation)	2–1	(Turkish Basketball Federation) Galatasaray MCT Technic	84–83	62–64	99–59
Unicaja (Spanish Basketball Federation)	2–0	(German Basketball Federation) Alba Berlin	72–69	88–85	—

==== Final Four ====
Team 1	Score	Team 2
Semi-finals
Unicaja (Spanish Basketball Federation)	65–78	(Hellenic Basketball Federation) AEK
Rytas (Lithuanian Basketball Federation)	87–69	(Spanish Basketball Federation) La Laguna Tenerife
3rd place game
Unicaja (Spanish Basketball Federation)	85–80	(Spanish Basketball Federation) La Laguna Tenerife

=== FIBA Europe Cup ===
==== Regular season ====
===== Group A =====
Pos	Team	Pld	W	L	PF	PA	PD	Pts	Qualification
1	(Spanish Basketball Federation) UCAM Murcia	6	5	1	507	424	+83	11	Advance to second round
2	(Basketball Federation of Bosnia and Herzegovina) Bosna BH Telecom	6	4	2	465	439	+26	10	Advance to second round
3	(Polish Basketball Federation) Start Lublin	6	2	4	478	509	−31	8	
4	(Bulgarian Basketball Federation) Rilski Sportist	6	1	5	412	490	−78	7	

Source: FIBA

===== Group E =====
Pos	Team	Pld	W	L	PF	PA	PD	Pts	Qualification
1	(Spanish Basketball Federation) Surne Bilbao Basket	6	5	1	617	415	+202	11	Advance to second round
2	(Hellenic Basketball Federation) Peristeri	6	5	1	525	435	+90	11	Advance to second round
3	(Czech Basketball Federation) PUMPA Basket Brno	6	1	5	456	540	−84	7	
4	(Georgian Basketball Federation) Kutaisi 2010	6	1	5	382	590	−208	7	

Source: FIBA

===== Group H =====
Pos	Team	Pld	W	L	PF	PA	PD	Pts	Qualification
1	(Spanish Basketball Federation) Casademont Zaragoza	6	5	1	571	449	+122	11	Advance to second round
2	(Hungarian Basketball Federation) Falco Szombathely	6	4	2	514	477	+37	10	Advance to second round
3	(Danish Basketball Association) Bakken Bears	6	2	4	514	519	−5	8	
4	(Cyprus Basketball Federation) Anorthosis Famagusta	6	1	5	426	580	−154	7	

Source: FIBA

==== Second round ====
===== Group K =====
Pos	Team	Pld	W	L	PF	PA	PD	Pts	Qualification
1	(Spanish Basketball Federation) UCAM Murcia	6	6	0	536	444	+92	12	Advance to quarter-finals
2	(Hungarian Basketball Federation) Falco Szombathely	6	3	3	466	489	−23	9	Advance to quarter-finals
3	(German Basketball Federation) Rostock Seawolves	6	2	4	489	484	+5	8	
4	(Polish Basketball Federation) Energa Trefl Sopot	6	1	5	451	525	−74	7	

Source: FIBA

===== Group M =====
Pos	Team	Pld	W	L	PF	PA	PD	Pts	Qualification
1	(Spanish Basketball Federation) Surne Bilbao Basket	6	6	0	543	408	+135	12	Advance to quarter-finals
2	(Hellenic Basketball Federation) PAOK	6	4	2	519	449	+70	10	Advance to quarter-finals
3	(Portuguese Basketball Federation) Sporting CP	6	1	5	454	522	−68	7	
4	(Slovak Basketball Association) BC Prievidza	6	1	5	401	538	−137	7	

Source: FIBA

===== Group N =====
Pos	Team	Pld	W	L	PF	PA	PD	Pts	Qualification
1	(Hellenic Basketball Federation) Peristeri	6	5	1	505	477	+28	11	Advance to quarter-finals
2	(Turkish Basketball Federation) Petkim Spor	6	4	2	494	441	+53	10	Advance to quarter-finals
3	(Spanish Basketball Federation) Casademont Zaragoza	6	2	4	463	491	−28	8	
4	(Italian Basketball Federation) Dinamo Sassari	6	1	5	446	499	−53	7	

Source: FIBA

==== Playoffs ====
Team 1	Agg.	Team 2	1st leg	2nd leg
Quarter-finals
UCAM Murcia (Spanish Basketball Federation)	162–147	(Italian Basketball Federation) Pallacanestro Reggiana	85–84	77–63
Surne Bilbao Basket (Spanish Basketball Federation)	162–129	(Turkish Basketball Federation) Aliaga Petkimspor	77–69	85–60
Semi-finals
UCAM Murcia (Spanish Basketball Federation)	162–164	(Hellenic Basketball Federation) PAOK mateco	73–79	89–85
Surne Bilbao Basket (Spanish Basketball Federation)	193–169	(Hungarian Basketball Federation) Falco Szombathely	98–81	95–88
Finals
Surne Bilbao Basket (Spanish Basketball Federation)	162–153	(Hellenic Basketball Federation) PAOK mateco	73–79	89–74

== Men's basketball ==
=== Liga ACB ===
==== Regular season ====
Pos	Team	Pld	W	L	PF	PA	PD	Qualification or relegation
1	Real Madrid	34	26	8	3160	2906	+254	Qualification to playoffs
2	Valencia Basket	34	25 (Note: Head–to–head record: Valencia Basket 2–2 (+14), Kosner Baskonia 2–2 (+2), UCAM Murcia 2–2 (−16).)	9	3218	2829	+389	Qualification to playoffs
3	Kosner Baskonia	34	25	9	3177	2950	+227	Qualification to playoffs
4	UCAM Murcia	34	25	9	3113	2876	+237	Qualification to playoffs
5	Barça	34	24	10	3046	2815	+231	Qualification to playoffs
6	Asisa Joventut	34	22	12	2906	2766	+140	Qualification to playoffs
7	Surne Bilbao	34	19	15	2884	2924	−40	Qualification to playoffs
8	La Laguna Tenerife	34	18	16	3040	2940	+100	Qualification to playoffs
9	Unicaja	34	17	17	2978	2956	+22	
10	Baxi Manresa	34	16	18	2932	3080	−148	
11	Río Breogán	34	15	19	3094	3171	−77	
12	Bàsquet Girona	34	14	20	2913	3024	−111	
13	Recoletas Salud San Pablo Burgos	34	12 (Note: Head–to–head record: Recoletas Salud San Pablo Burgos 1–1 (+7), Hiopos Lleida 1–1 (−7).)	22	3049	3152	−103	
14	Hiopos Lleida	34	12	22	2856	3097	−241	
15	Casademont Zaragoza	34	10 (Note: Head–to–head record: Casademont Zaragoza 3–1 (+31), MoraBanc Andorra 2–2 (−17), Dreamland Gran Canaria 1–3 (−14).)	24	2962	3176	−214	
16	MoraBanc Andorra	34	10	24	2976	3169	−193	
17	Dreamland Gran Canaria	34	10	24	2764	2932	−168	Relegation to Primera FEB
18	Coviran Granada	34	6	28	2848	3153	−305	Relegation to Primera FEB

Source: ACB
Rules for classification: 1) Win–loss record; 2) Head–to–head record; 3) Head–to–head point difference; 4) Point difference; 5) Points scored; 6) Sum of quotients of points scored (Note: Head–to–head record is used only after all the matches between the teams in question have been played)

==== Playoffs ====
Quarterfinals
2	Valencia Basket	83	88	2
7	Surne Bilbao	80	71	0
3	Kosner Baskonia	85	63	88	1
6	Asisa Joventut	71	82	96	2
4	UCAM Murcia	68	90	76	1
5	Barça	91	87	100	2
1	Real Madrid	97	118	95	1
8	La Laguna Tenerife	98	83	107	2

Semifinals
2	Valencia Basket	118	90	87	3
6	Asisa Joventut	117	76	75	0
5	Barça	100	97	85	3
8	La Laguna Tenerife	67	89	76	0

Finals
2	Valencia Basket	112	102	88	108	3
5	Barça	113	75	80	84	1

=== Primera FEB ===
==== Regular season ====
Pos	Team	Pld	W	L	PF	PA	PD	Pts	Promotion, qualification or relegation
1	Monbus Obradoiro	32	28	4	2945	2420	+525	60	Promotion to Liga ACB
2	Leyma Coruña	32	28	4	2896	2502	+394	60	Qualification to playoffs
3	Súper Agropal Palencia	32	25	7	2675	2324	+351	57	Qualification to playoffs
4	Movistar Estudiantes	32	20	12	2682	2561	+121	52	Qualification to playoffs
5	Inveready Gipuzkoa	32	19	13	2520	2386	+134	51	Qualification to playoffs
6	Alimerka Oviedo Baloncesto	32	19	13	2626	2494	+132	51	Qualification to playoffs
7	Flexicar Fuenlabrada	32	19	13	2553	2582	−29	51	Qualification to playoffs
8	Hestia Menorca	32	17	15	2574	2456	+118	49	Qualification to playoffs
9	HLA Alicante	32	15	17	2632	2628	+4	47	Qualification to playoffs
10	Caja Rural CB Zamora	32	15	17	2676	2748	−72	47	
11	Grupo Alega Cantabria	32	12	20	2481	2708	−227	44	
12	Cloud.gal Ourense Baloncesto	32	12	20	2530	2604	−74	44	
13	Grupo Ureta Tizona Burgos	32	10	22	2668	2847	−179	42	
14	Fibwi Mallorca Bàsquet Palma	32	10	22	2437	2629	−192	42	
15	Palmer Basket Mallorca Palma	32	8	24	2316	2653	−337	40	
16	Grupo Caesa Seguros FC Cartagena CB	32	8	24	2367	2712	−345	40	Relegation to Segunda FEB
17	Melilla Ciudad del Deporte	32	7	25	2445	2769	−324	39	Relegation to Segunda FEB

Source: FEB

=== Cup competitions ===
==== Copa del Rey ====
Quarterfinals; 19–20 February
Valencia Basket	95
Asisa Joventut	84
Real Madrid	100
Unicaja	70
Barça	91
UCAM Murcia	85
Kosner Baskonia	91
La Laguna Tenerife	81

Semifinals; 21 February
Valencia Basket	106
Real Madrid	108
Barça	67
Kosner Baskonia	70

Final; 22 February
Real Madrid	89
Kosner Baskonia	100

==== Spain Cup ====
Semi-finals; 24 January
Súper Agropal Palencia	69
Flexicar Fuenlabrada	57
Cloud.gal Ourense Baloncesto	71
Movistar Estudiantes	90

Final; 25 January
Súper Agropal Palencia	69
Movistar Estudiantes	73

Source: FEB

==== Supercopa de España ====
Semifinals
Real Madrid	72
La Laguna Tenerife	71
Unicaja	87
Valencia Basket	93

Final
Real Madrid	94
Valencia Basket	98

== Women's basketball ==
=== Liga Femenina ===
==== Regular season ====
Pos	Team	Pld	W	L	PF	PA	PD	Pts	Qualification or relegation
1	Casademont Zaragoza	30	27	3	2370	1978	+392	57	Qualification to playoffs
2	Spar Girona	30	24	6	2459	2031	+428	54	Qualification to playoffs
3	Valencia Basket	30	21	9	2286	1969	+317	51	Qualification to playoffs
4	Hozono Global Jairis	30	19	11	2203	1983	+220	49	Qualification to playoffs
5	Perfumerías Avenida	30	18	12	2083	2033	+50	48	Qualification to playoffs
6	Durán Maquinaria Ensino	30	16	14	2199	2170	+29	46	Qualification to playoffs
7	Innova-tsn Leganés	30	15	15	2065	2053	+12	45	Qualification to playoffs
8	Ingeniería Ambiental CAB Estepona	30	14	16	2175	2226	−51	44	Qualification to playoffs
9	Baxi Ferrol	30	14	16	2136	2211	−75	44	
10	Lointek Gernika Bizkaia	30	12	18	2234	2318	−84	42	
11	Movistar Estudiantes	30	12	18	2275	2294	−19	42	
12	IDK Euskotren	30	12	18	1962	2040	−78	42	
13	Cadí La Seu	30	11	19	2037	2259	−222	41	
14	Kutxabank Araski	30	11	19	1970	2201	−231	41	
15	Club Joventut Badalona	30	11	19	2143	2228	−85	41	Relegation to LF Challenge
16	Spar Gran Canaria	30	3	27	2105	2708	−603	33	Relegation to LF Challenge

Source: FEB

==== Playoffs ====
Quarter-finals
1	Casademont Zaragoza	84	90	174
8	Ingeniería Ambiental CAB Estepona	68	49	117
4	Hozono Global Jairis	65	55	120
5	Perfumerías Avenida	74	72	146
2	Spar Girona	82	89	171
7	Innova-tsn Leganés	82	63	145
3	Valencia Basket	85	73	158
6	Durán Maquinaria Ensino	72	70	142

Semi-finals
1	Casademont Zaragoza	67	67	134
5	Perfumerías Avenida	69	56	125
2	Spar Girona	66	73	139
3	Valencia Basket	67	73	140

Final
1	Casademont Zaragoza	73	67	0
3	Valencia Basket	81	68	2

Source: FEB
