= 2024–25 in Spanish basketball =

Basketball in Spain
- Season: 2024–25

Men's basketball
- Liga ACB: Real Madrid
- Primera FEB: Silbö San Pablo Burgos
- Segunda FEB: Palmer Basket Mallorca Palma
- Copa del Rey: Unicaja
- Spain Cup: Silbö San Pablo Burgos
- Supercopa: Unicaja

Women's basketball
- Liga Femenina: Valencia Basket
- Copa de la Reina: Hozono Global Jairis
- Supercopa: Valencia Basket

The 2024–25 season was the 89th season of competitive basketball in Spain.

== Promotion and relegation (pre-season) ==
=== Men's basketball ===
==== Liga ACB ====
▲ Promoted to league	▼ Relegated from league
Leyma Coruña; Hiopos Lleida	Monbus Obradoiro; Zunder Palencia

==== Primera FEB ====
▲ Promoted to league	▼ Relegated from league
ODILO FC Cartagena CB; Caja Rural CB Zamora; CB Starlabs Morón	Melilla Ciudad del Deporte (Note: It merged in a single team with Melilla Ciudad del Deporte Enrique Soler.); Cáceres Patrimonio de la Humanidad; Rioverde Clavijo

==== Segunda FEB ====
▲ Promoted to league	▼ Relegated from league
Nadunet Refitel Bàsquet Llíria; Coto Córdoba CB; La Salud Archena; PROINBENI UPB Gandia; Cultural y Deportiva Leonesa; Sol Gironés Bisbal Básquet	~~CB Almansa con Afanion~~ (Note: It was dissolved due to economical troubles.); Juventud Alcalá Escribano EME; Fundación Globalcaja La Roda; ~~Ibersol CB Tarragona~~ (Note: It swapped places with Sandá Electroclima CB L'Hospitalet.); Safir Fruits Alginet; Huelva Comercio LRi21 VIRIDIS
▲ Applied to participate	▼ Withdrawn to participate
Caja'87 Baloncesto (Note: It achieved a vacant berth after the merger of the two teams of the city of Melilla.)	Sandá Electroclima CB L'Hospitalet (Note: It swapped places with Ibersol CB Tarragona.)

=== Women's basketball ===
==== Liga Femenina ====
▲ Promoted from LF Challenge	▼ Relegated to LF Challenge
Osés Construcción; Club Joventut Badalona	~~Spar Gran Canaria~~ (Note: It swapped places with Barça CBS that withdrew to play in the league.); Embutidos Pajariel Bembibre PDM

== National team ==
=== Spain men's national basketball team ===
==== EuroBasket 2025 qualification ====
===== Group C =====
Pos	Team	Pld	W	L	PF	PA	PD	Pts	Qualification
1	Latvia	6	6	0	475	416	+59	12	EuroBasket 2025 as host
2	Spain	6	3	3	413	415	−2	9 (Note: Tied on head-to-head points. Head-to-head points difference: Spain +2, Belgium –2.)	EuroBasket 2025
3	Belgium	6	3	3	433	395	+38	9	EuroBasket 2025
4	Slovakia	6	0	6	386	481	−95	6	

Source: FIBA
Rules for classification: 1) Points; 2) Head-to-head; 3) Points difference; 4) Points scored.
Notes:

22 November 2024	Slovakia	72–76(OT)	Spain	Bratislava, Slovakia
18:00	Scoring by quarter: 10–14, 15–24, 21–10, 13–11, Overtime: 13–17
	Pts: Brodziansky 23; Rebs: Brodziansky 10; Asts: Ihring 10; Eff: Brodziansky 22	Boxscore	Pts: Yusta 21; Rebs: Yusta 10; Asts: Alocén 5 Eff: Yusta 19	Arena: Tipos aréna Attendance: 10,046; Referees: Martin Vulić (CRO), Cecília Montgomery-Tóth (HUN), Péter Praksch (HUN)

25 November 2024	Spain	84–71	Slovakia	Ourense, Spain
20:00	Scoring by quarter: 22–18, 25–14, 24–25, 13–14
	Pts: Yusta 25; Rebs: Pradilla 8 Asts: Alocén 7 Eff: Yusta 26	Boxscore	Pts: Brodziansky 19; Rebs: Malovec 7 Asts: Ihring 8 Eff: Brodziansky 18	Arena: Pazo dos Deportes Paco Paz; Attendance: 3,995; Referees: Michał Proc (POL), Igor Mitrovski (MKD), Josip Jurčević (CRO)

20 February 2025	Latvia	83–66	Spain	Riga, Latvia
18:30	Scoring by quarter: 20–17, 21–17, 22–16, 20–16
	Pts: R. Kurucs 28; Rebs: Gražulis, R. Kurucs 7 Asts: Gražulis 6 Eff: R. Kurucs 35	Boxscore	Pts: Yusta 15; Rebs: González, López-Arostegui 6 Asts: Villar 3 Eff: González 12	Arena: Xiaomi Arena; Attendance: 11,135; Referees: Wojciech Liszka (POL), Mihkel Männiste (EST), Ivor Matějek (CZE)

23 February 2025	Spain	59–52	Belgium	León, Spain
17:00	Scoring by quarter: 11–11, 11–14, 20–15, 17–12
	Pts: López-Arostegui 13; Rebs: Almansa, Guerrero 5 Asts: Saint-Supery 4 Eff: López-Arostegui 12	Boxscore	Pts: Mwema 21; Rebs: de Ridder 13; Asts: Meeusen 5 Eff: Mwema 20	Arena: Palacio de los Deportes; Attendance: 4,587; Referees: Julio Anaya (PAN), Martin Horozov (BUL), Orhan Hekimoğlu (TUR)

==== EuroBasket 2025 ====
===== Group C =====
Pos	Team	Pld	W	L	PF	PA	PD	Pts	Qualification
1	Greece	5	4	1	432	354	+78	9 (Note: Greece 75–66 Italy)	Knockout stage
2	Italy	5	4	1	396	333	+63	9	Knockout stage
3	Bosnia and Herzegovina	5	3	2	401	401	0	8	Knockout stage
4	Georgia	5	2	3	367	386	−19	7 (Note: Georgia 83–69 Spain)	Knockout stage
5	Spain	5	2	3	397	354	+43	7	
6	Cyprus (H)	5	0	5	295	460	−165	5	

Source: FIBA
Rules for classification: 1) Points; 2) Head-to-head results; 3) Points difference; 4) Points scored.
(H) Hosts
Notes:

28 August 2025	Georgia	83–69	Spain	Limassol, Cyprus
14:00	Scoring by quarter: 20–17, 17–18, 20–14, 26–20
	Pts: Mamukelashvili 19; Rebs: Burjanadze, Mamukelashvili 7 Asts: Mamukelashvili 6 Eff: Mamukelashvili 24	Boxscore	Pts: J. Hernangómez 13; Rebs: J. Hernangómez 8 Asts: de Larrea 5 Eff: J. Hernangómez 18	Arena: Spyros Kyprianou Arena; Attendance: 1,520; Referees: Matthew Kallio (CAN), Paulo Marques (POR), Petar Pešić (SRB)

30 August 2025	Spain	88–67	Bosnia and Herzegovina	Limassol, Cyprus
20:30	Scoring by quarter: 24–16, 20–14, 28–17, 16–20
	Pts: Aldama 19; Rebs: Parra 6 Asts: Brizuela, de Larrea 5 Eff: Aldama, W. Hernangómez 20	Boxscore	Pts: Kamenjaš 14; Rebs: Kamenjaš 10; Asts: Atić 7 Eff: Kamenjaš 19	Arena: Spyros Kyprianou Arena; Attendance: 2,739; Referees: Jorge Vázquez (PUR), Gvidas Gedvilas (LTU), Ventsislav Velikov (BUL)

31 August 2025	Spain	91–47	Cyprus	Limassol, Cyprus
17:15	Scoring by quarter: 19–9, 22–8, 29–12, 21–18
	Pts: W. Hernangómez 19; Rebs: W. Hernangómez 8 Asts: de Larrea, Saint-Supéry 5 Eff: W. Hernangómez 25	Boxscore	Pts: Willis 16; Rebs: Willis 6 Asts: five players 2 Eff: Willis 18	Arena: Spyros Kyprianou Arena; Attendance: 5,068; Referees: Gvidas Gedvilas (LTU), Petar Pešić (SRB), Carsten Straube (GER)

2 September 2025	Italy	67–63	Spain	Limassol, Cyprus
20:30	Scoring by quarter: 10–18, 20–18, 19–11, 18–16
	Pts: Diouf 14; Rebs: Niang 10; Asts: Spissu 6 Eff: Niang 20	Boxscore	Pts: Aldama 19; Rebs: Aldama 10; Asts: Aldama 4 Eff: Aldama 26	Arena: Spyros Kyprianou Arena; Attendance: 3,839; Referees: Matthew Kallio (CAN), Jorge Vázquez (PUR), Péter Praksch (HUN)

4 September 2025	Spain	86–90	Greece	Limassol, Cyprus
20:30	Scoring by quarter: 20–31, 15–19, 28–18, 23–22
	Pts: Pradilla 14; Rebs: Aldama 8 Asts: de Larrea 6 Eff: Pradilla 16	Boxscore	Pts: G. Antetokounmpo 25; Rebs: G. Antetokounmpo 14; Asts: G. Antetokounmpo 9 Eff: G. Antetokounmpo 35	Arena: Spyros Kyprianou Arena; Attendance: 7,709; Referees: Jorge Vázquez (PUR), Mārtiņš Kozlovskis (LAT), Péter Praksch (HUN)

=== Spain women's national basketball team ===
==== EuroBasket Women 2025 qualification ====
===== Group A =====
7 November 2024	Spain	66–59	Netherlands	Castellón, Spain
21:00	Scoring by quarter: 16–7, 15–18, 19–16, 16–18
	Pts: Conde 17; Rebs: Fam 10; Asts: Ortiz 4 Eff: Fam 21	Boxscore	Pts: Hof 19; Rebs: Hof 12; Asts: Cornelius 4 Eff: Hof 21	Arena: Ciutat de Castelló; Attendance: 950; Referees: Emma Perry (IRL), Chess Van Looy (BEL), Ana Costa (POR)

10 November 2024	Spain	78–62	Croatia	Castellón, Spain
19:00	Scoring by quarter: 18–18, 25–16, 21–16, 14–12
	Pts: Ginzo 15; Rebs: Ginzo 8 Asts: Cazorla 8 Eff: Ginzo 16	Boxscore	Pts: Cvitković 24; Rebs: Begić 11; Asts: Slonjšak 8 Eff: Cvitković 26	Arena: Ciutat de Castelló; Attendance: 1,900; Referees: Ewa Matuszewska (POL), Edgard Ceccarelli (FRA), Tolga Edis (TUR)

6 February 2025	Austria	45–76	Spain	Vienna, Austria
19:00	Scoring by quarter: 17–28, 10–15, 8–16, 10–17
	Pts: Sagerer 11; Rebs: Koizar 4 Asts: Koizar 4 Eff: Sagerer 8	Boxscore	Pts: Gustafson 18; Rebs: Fam 8 Asts: Cazorla 6 Eff: Pueyo 24	Arena: Hallmann Dome; Attendance: 500; Referees: Ivana Ivanović (SRB), Nataša Dragojević (MNE), Alexandra Subernetcaia (MDA)

9 February 2025	Netherlands	64–81	Spain	Almere
14:30	Scoring by quarter: 15–19, 16–17, 13–28, 20–17
	Pts: Cornelius 14; Rebs: Hof 12; Asts: Cornelius 10; Eff: Cornelius 23	Boxscore	Pts: Gustafson 27; Rebs: Gustafson 11; Asts: Martín 3 Eff: Gustafson 33	Arena: Topsportcentrum; Attendance: 2,000; Referees: Çisil Güngör (TUR), Martin Van Hoye (BEL), Kristīne Simanoviča (LAT)

==== Friendlies ====
30 May 2025	Spain	64–40	Greece	Inca, Spain
19:00	Scoring by quarter: 15–6, 15–8, 17–9, 17–17
	Pts: Fam 11; Rebs: Fam 12; Asts: Ortiz, Pueyo 3 Eff: Fam 19	Report	Pts: Krimili, Spanou 9 Rebs: four players 5 Asts: Pavlopoulou 3 Eff: Ioanna Chatzileonti 9	Arena: Palau Municipal d'Esports; Referees: Roberto Lucas, Alfonso Olivares, Iyán González

1 June 2025	Spain	57–42	Italy	Inca, Spain
20:00	Scoring by quarter: 9–8, 18–9, 11–15, 19–10
	Pts: Etxarri 9 Rebs: Etxarri 7 Asts: Ortiz 4 Eff: Etxarri 15	Report	Pts: Verona 9 Rebs: Cubaj 8 Asts: Keys, Santucci 3 Eff: Verona 15	Arena: Palau Municipal d'Esports; Referees: Roberto Lucas, Alfonso Olivares, Ariadna Chueca

10 June 2025	Portugal	59–68	Spain	Viana do Castelo, Portugal
20:00	Scoring by quarter: 6–18, 23–17, 17–13, 13–20
	Pts: Correia 14; Rebs: Silva 8 Asts: three players 2 Eff: Soeiro 13	Report	Pts: Ayuso 11; Rebs: Fam 9 Asts: Araújo 3 Eff: Fam 15	Arena: Pavilhão Municipal José Natário; Attendance: 300; Referees: Diogo Martins, Tiago Perdigão, Jorge Cabral

11 June 2025	Spain	94–64	Switzerland	Viana do Castelo, Portugal
18:00	Scoring by quarter: 29–23, 20–11, 21–17, 24–13
	Pts: Ginzo 24; Rebs: Araújo 7 Asts: Ayuso 4 Eff: Ginzo 28	Report	Pts: Fora 12; Rebs: Da Silva, Schwarz 3 Asts: Fora 3 Eff: Fora 13	Arena: Pavilhão Municipal José Natário; Attendance: 100; Referees: Luis Costa, Miguel Cardoso, Bruna Silva

==== EuroBasket Women 2025 ====
===== Group D =====
19 June 2025	Great Britain	70–85	Spain	Hamburg, Germany
17:15	Scoring by quarter: 13–18, 12–30, 24–20, 21–17
	Pts: Ashby 17; Rebs: Fagbenle 8 Asts: Winterburn 6 Eff: Fagbenle 19	Boxscore	Pts: Martín 14; Rebs: Ortiz 5 Asts: Ortiz 7 Eff: Ortiz, Pueyo 18	Arena: Inselpark Arena; Attendance: 3,087; Referees: Dariusz Zapolski (POL), Ivana Ivanović (SRB), Blaž Zupančič (SLO)

20 June 2025	Spain	79–60	Germany	Hamburg, Germany
20:00	Scoring by quarter: 19–16, 17–14, 18–13, 25–17
	Pts: Carrera 20; Rebs: Araújo, Torrens 7 Asts: Ortiz 7 Eff: Carrera 19	Boxscore	Pts: Geiselsöder 16; Rebs: Fiebich 9 Asts: Peterson 7 Eff: Geiselsöder 18	Arena: Inselpark Arena; Attendance: 3,414; Referees: Andris Aunkrogers (LAT), Gvidas Gedvilas (LTU), Çisil Güngör (TUR)

22 June 2025	Sweden	75–78(OT)	Spain	Hamburg, Germany
15:15	Scoring by quarter: 16–16, 7–15, 19–19, 22–14, Overtime: 11–14
	Pts: Lundquist 21; Rebs: Lundquist 9 Asts: Lundquist 8 Eff: Lundquist 22	Boxscore	Pts: Torrens 20; Rebs: Ortiz 6 Asts: Buenavida, Fam 3 Eff: Fam 17	Arena: Inselpark Arena; Attendance: 3,223; Referees: Dariusz Zapolski (POL), Alexandre Deman (FRA), Çisil Güngör (TUR)

===== Knockout phase =====
25 June 2025 QF	Spain	88–81	Czech Republic	Piraeus, Greece
16:30	Scoring by quarter: 12–18, 21–26, 28–22, 27–15
	Pts: Carrera 31; Rebs: Carrera, Torrens 8 Asts: Ayuso, Ortiz 5 Eff: Carrera 37	Boxscore	Pts: Holešínská 23; Rebs: Čechová 8 Asts: Holešínská 6 Eff: Holešínská 23	Arena: Peace and Friendship Stadium; Attendance: 733; Referees: Martin Horozov (BUL), Silvia Marziali (ITA), Péter Praksch (HUN)

27 June 2025 SF	France	64–65	Spain	Piraeus, Greece
16:30	Scoring by quarter: 18–18, 20–13, 8–18, 18–16
	Pts: Ayayi 19; Rebs: Salaün 5 Asts: Bernies 7 Eff: Ayayi 18	Boxscore	Pts: Fam 21; Rebs: Fam 9 Asts: Torrens 7 Eff: Fam 31	Arena: Peace and Friendship Stadium; Attendance: 2,495; Referees: Gatis Saliņš (LAT), Julio Anaya (PAN), Martin Horozov (BUL)

29 June 2025 Final	Spain	65–67	Belgium	Piraeus, Greece
19:30	Scoring by quarter: 19–18, 18–13, 15–18, 13–18
	Pts: three players 11; Rebs: Torrens 5 Asts: Fam, Ortiz 4 Eff: Pueyo 12	Boxscore	Pts: Allemand 19; Rebs: Meesseman 11; Asts: Meesseman 7 Eff: Meesseman 24	Arena: Peace and Friendship Stadium; Attendance: 7,827; Referees: Gatis Saliņš (LAT), Paulina Gajdosz (POL), Péter Praksch (HUN)

== Worldwide competitions ==
=== FIBA Intercontinental Cup ===
==== Group stage ====
Pos	Team	Pld	W	L	PF	PA	PD	Pts	Qualification
1	(Spanish Basketball Federation) Unicaja	2	2	0	190	137	+53	4	Advance to final
2	(Lebanese Basketball Federation) Al Riyadi	2	1	1	139	171	−32	3	Qualification to third place game
3	(Angolan Basketball Federation) Petro de Luanda	2	0	2	153	174	−21	2	Qualification to fifth place game

Source: FIBA

12 September 2024	Petro de Luanda (Angolan Basketball Federation)	78–94	(Spanish Basketball Federation) Unicaja	Singapore
14:00	Scoring by quarter: 6–25, 26–30, 20–20, 26–19
	Pts: Castro 13; Rebs: Castro 9 Asts: Diabate, Domingos 6 Eff: Moreira 18	Boxscore	Pts: Kalinoski 16; Rebs: Osetkowski 8 Asts: Osetkowski 7 Eff: Osetkowski 22	Arena: Singapore Indoor Stadium; Attendance: 1,139; Referees: Johnny Batista (PUR), Carlos Peralta (ECU), James Alexander Boyer (AUS)

13 September 2024	Al Riyadi (Lebanese Basketball Federation)	59–96	(Spanish Basketball Federation) Unicaja	Singapore
14:00	Scoring by quarter: 18–23, 13–19, 10–28, 18–26
	Pts: Kikanović 19; Rebs: Kikanović 8 Asts: Gyokchyan 5 Eff: Kikanović 25	Boxscore	Pts: Perry 17; Rebs: Pérez 7 Asts: Díaz 6 Eff: Perry 19	Arena: Singapore Indoor Stadium; Attendance: 2,626; Referees: Julio Anaya (PAN), Wojciech Liszka (POL), Sun Jian (CHN)

==== Final ====
15 September 2024	Unicaja (Spanish Basketball Federation)	75–60	(USA Basketball) NBA G League United	Singapore
13:00	Scoring by quarter: 22–17, 16–15, 19–12, 18–16
	Pts: Osetkowski 15; Rebs: Kravish 7 Asts: Perry 8 Eff: Sima 17	Boxscore	Pts: Bowden 20; Rebs: Brown 6 Asts: three players 3 Eff: Bowden 17	Arena: Singapore Indoor Stadium; Attendance: 8,205; Referees: Julio Anaya (PAN), Wojciech Liszka (POL), James Alexander Boyer (AUS)

== European competitions ==
=== EuroLeague ===
==== Regular season ====
Pos	Team	Pld	W	L	PF	PA	PD	Qualification
1	(Hellenic Basketball Federation) Olympiacos	34	24	10	2941	2770	+171	Qualification to playoffs
2	(Turkish Basketball Federation) Fenerbahçe Beko	34	23	11	2829	2760	+69	Qualification to playoffs
3	(Hellenic Basketball Federation) Panathinaikos AKTOR	34	22	12	2990	2843	+147	Qualification to playoffs
4	(French Federation of Basketball) Monaco	34	21	13	2913	2801	+112	Qualification to playoffs
5	(Spanish Basketball Federation) Barcelona	34	20	14	2966	2837	+129	Qualification to playoffs
6	(Turkish Basketball Federation) Anadolu Efes	34	20	14	2941	2788	+153	Qualification to playoffs
7	(Spanish Basketball Federation) Real Madrid	34	20	14	2870	2797	+73	Qualification to play-in
8	(French Federation of Basketball) Paris Basketball	34	19	15	2940	2910	+30	Qualification to play-in
9	(German Basketball Federation) Bayern Munich	34	19	15	2965	2984	−19	Qualification to play-in
10	(Basketball Federation of Serbia) Crvena zvezda Meridianbet	34	18	16	2776	2714	+62	Qualification to play-in
11	(Italian Basketball Federation) EA7 Emporio Armani Milan	34	17	17	2896	2934	−38	
12	(Basketball Federation of Serbia) Partizan Mozzart Bet	34	16	18	2780	2724	+56	
13	(Lithuanian Basketball Federation) Žalgiris	34	15	19	2626	2669	−43	
14	(Spanish Basketball Federation) Baskonia	34	14	20	2795	2830	−35	
15	(French Federation of Basketball) LDLC ASVEL	34	13	21	2740	2897	−157	
16	(Israeli Basketball Association) Maccabi Playtika Tel Aviv	34	11	23	2921	3052	−131	
17	(Italian Basketball Federation) Virtus Segafredo Bologna	34	9	25	2683	2834	−151	
18	(German Basketball Federation) ALBA Berlin	34	5	29	2646	3074	−428	

Source: EuroLeague
Rules for classification: Regular season tiebreakers

=== EuroCup ===
==== Regular season ====
===== Group A =====
Pos	Team	Pld	W	L	PF	PA	PD	Qualification
1	(Turkish Basketball Federation) Bahçeşehir Koleji	18	14	4	1463	1334	+129	Advance to quarterfinals
2	(Israeli Basketball Association) Hapoel Shlomo Tel Aviv	18	12	6	1583	1424	+159	Advance to quarterfinals
3	(Spanish Basketball Federation) Dreamland Gran Canaria	18	12	6	1409	1351	+58	Advance to eighthfinals
4	(Lithuanian Basketball Federation) Wolves Twinsbet	18	10	8	1501	1523	−22	Advance to eighthfinals
5	(Turkish Basketball Federation) Beşiktaş Fibabanka	18	10	8	1526	1504	+22	Advance to eighthfinals
6	(Basketball Federation of Montenegro) Budućnost VOLI	18	9	9	1520	1498	+22	Advance to eighthfinals
7	(German Basketball Federation) ratiopharm Ulm	18	9	9	1543	1563	−20	
8	(Spanish Basketball Federation) Joventut Badalona	18	7	11	1422	1505	−83	
9	(Italian Basketball Federation) Dolomiti Energia Trento	18	6	12	1413	1510	−97	
10	(Polish Basketball Federation) Trefl Sopot	18	1	17	1354	1522	−168	

Source: EuroCup
Rules for classification: All points scored in extra period(s) are not counted in the standings, nor for any tie-break situation.

===== Group B =====
Pos	Team	Pld	W	L	PF	PA	PD	Qualification
1	(Spanish Basketball Federation) Valencia Basket	18	16	2	1726	1460	+266	Advance to quarterfinals
2	(Israeli Basketball Association) Hapoel Bank Yahav Jerusalem	18	11	7	1512	1398	+114	Advance to quarterfinals
3	(Turkish Basketball Federation) Türk Telekom	18	10	8	1437	1470	−33	Advance to eighthfinals
4	(Basketball Federation of Slovenia) Cedevita Olimpija	18	10	8	1476	1471	+5	Advance to eighthfinals
5	(Romanian Basketball Federation) U-BT Cluj-Napoca	18	10	8	1602	1566	+36	Advance to eighthfinals
6	(Italian Basketball Federation) Umana Reyer Venezia	18	10	8	1465	1484	−19	Advance to eighthfinals
7	(French Federation of Basketball) Cosea JL Bourg	18	9	9	1560	1497	+63	
8	(German Basketball Federation) Veolia Towers Hamburg	18	6	12	1400	1562	−162	
9	(Lithuanian Basketball Federation) 7bet-Lietkabelis	18	5	13	1470	1560	−90	
10	(Hellenic Basketball Federation) Aris Midea	18	3	15	1341	1521	−180	

Source: EuroCup
Rules for classification: All points scored in extra period(s) are not counted in the standings, nor for any tie-break situation.

=== Champions League ===
==== Qualifying rounds ====
Team 1	Score	Team 2
Quarter-finals
MoraBanc Andorra (Spanish Basketball Federation)	91–73	(Basketball Belgium) Windrose Giants Antwerp
Semi-finals
Telekom Baskets Bonn (German Basketball Federation)	99–91	(Spanish Basketball Federation) MoraBanc Andorra

==== Regular season ====
===== Group B =====
Pos	Team	Pld	W	L	PF	PA	PD	Pts	Qualification
1	(Spain) Unicaja	6	6	0	584	432	+152	12	Advance to round of 16
2	(Turkey) Petkim Spor	6	4	2	475	503	−28	10	Advance to play-ins
3	(Belgium) Filou Oostende	6	2	4	468	480	−12	8	Advance to play-ins
4	(Poland) King Szczecin	6	0	6	388	500	−112	6	

Source: Group Standings

===== Group C =====
Pos	Team	Pld	W	L	PF	PA	PD	Pts	Qualification
1	(Spain) La Laguna Tenerife	6	6	0	502	396	+106	12	Advance to round of 16
2	(Turkey) Pinar Karşıyaka	6	4	2	501	451	+50	10	Advance to play-ins
3	(France) Saint-Quentin	6	2	4	429	473	−44	8	Advance to play-ins
4	(Greece) Kolossos H Hotels	6	0	6	387	499	−112	6	

Source: Group Standings

===== Group G =====
Pos	Team	Pld	W	L	PF	PA	PD	Pts	Qualification
1	(Spain) BAXI Manresa	6	5	1	562	465	+97	11	Advance to round of 16
2	(Italy) Bertram Derthona Tortona	6	5	1	497	456	+41	11	Advance to play-ins
3	(Germany) Niners Chemnitz	6	1	5	450	512	−62	7	Advance to play-ins
4	(Portugal) Benfica	6	1	5	427	503	−76	7	

Source: Group Standings

===== Group H =====
Pos	Team	Pld	W	L	PF	PA	PD	Pts	Qualification
1	(Spain) UCAM Murcia	6	5	1	508	455	+53	11	Advance to round of 16
2	(Turkey) Manisa Basket	6	4	2	536	523	+13	10	Advance to play-ins
3	(Greece) Peristeri Domino's	6	2	4	449	457	−8	8	Advance to play-ins
4	(Serbia) FMP Soccerbet	6	1	5	445	503	−58	7	

Source: Group Standings

=== FIBA Europe Cup ===
==== Qualifying round ====
Team 1	Agg.	Team 2	1st leg	2nd leg
Surne Bilbao Basket (Spanish Basketball Federation)	169–125	(Lithuanian Basketball Federation) Neptūnas	74–66	95–59

==== Regular season ====
===== Group B =====
Pos	Team	Pld	W	L	PF	PA	PD	Pts	Qualification
1	(Spanish Basketball Federation) Casademont Zaragoza	6	5	1	542	491	+51	11	Advance to second round
2	(Slovak Basketball Association) Patrioti Levice	6	4	2	514	487	+27	10	
3	(Turkish Basketball Federation) Bursaspor Yörsan	6	3	3	513	504	+9	9	
4	(Cyprus Basketball Federation) Anorthosis Famagusta	6	0	6	438	525	−87	6	

Source: FIBA

===== Group J =====
Pos	Team	Pld	W	L	PF	PA	PD	Pts	Qualification
1	(Spanish Basketball Federation) Surne Bilbao Basket	6	6	0	538	364	+174	12	Advance to second round
2	(Slovak Basketball Association) Prievidza	6	4	2	484	473	+11	10	
3	(Georgian Basketball Federation) Kutaisi 2010	6	2	4	472	534	−62	8	
4	(Bulgarian Basketball Federation) Balkan	6	0	6	416	539	−123	6	

Source: FIBA

=== EuroLeague Women ===
==== Qualifying round ====
Team 1	Agg.	Team 2	1st leg	2nd leg
Casademont Zaragoza (Spain)		(Romania) CMS Constanța	Sep 18	Sep 25

==== Regular season ====
===== Group A =====
Pos	Team	Pld	W	L	PF	PA	PD	Pts	Qualification	LAN	SCH	AVE	DVTK
1	(France) Basket Landes	6	4	2	360	372	−12	10 (Note: Basket Landes 128–123 Beretta Familia Schio)	Second round	—	68–59	59–58	55–54
2	(Italy) Beretta Famila Schio	6	4	2	428	382	+46	10	Second round	64–60	—	92–58	71–57
3	(Spain) Perfumerias Avenida	6	3	3	401	401	0	9	Second round	81–52	69–79	—	67–55
4	(Hungary) DVTK HUN-Therm	6	1	5	356	390	−34	7	EuroCup Women	56–66	70–63	64–68	—

Source: FIBA
Legend: Blue = home team win; Red = away team win.
Rules for classification: 1) Points; 2) Points difference; 3) Points scored.

===== Group D =====
Pos	Team	Pld	W	L	PF	PA	PD	Pts	Qualification	VAL	PRA	REY	GYO
1	(Spain) Valencia Basket	6	5	1	457	406	+51	11	Second round	—	82–60	83–72	74–59
2	(Czech Republic) ZVVZ USK Praha	6	4	2	475	442	+33	10	Second round	64–67	—	100–85	82–62
3	(Italy) Umana Reyer Venezia	6	3	3	460	463	−3	9	Second round	75–67	66–86	—	82–68
4	(Hungary) Uni Győr	6	0	6	404	485	−81	6	EuroCup Women	74–86	76–81	59–80	—

Source: FIBA
Legend: Blue = home team win; Red = away team win.
Rules for classification: 1) Points; 2) Points difference; 3) Points scored.

=== EuroCup Women ===
==== Qualifying round ====
Team 1	Agg.	Team 2	1st leg	2nd leg
Baxi Ferrol (Spain)		(Italy) O.ME.P.S. Battipaglia	Sep 19	Sep 26

== Men's basketball ==
=== Liga ACB ===
==== Regular season ====
Pos	Team	Pld	W	L	PF	PA	PD	Qualification or relegation
1	Real Madrid	34	30	4	2967	2641	+326	Qualification to playoffs
2	Valencia Basket	34	25 (Note: Valencia Basket finished ahead of La Laguna Tenerife on head–to–head record: Valencia Basket 96–81 La Laguna Tenerife, La Laguna Tenerife 99–102 Valencia Basket.)	9	3289	2910	+379	Qualification to playoffs
3	La Laguna Tenerife	34	25	9	2970	2827	+143	Qualification to playoffs
4	Unicaja	34	23	11	3057	2857	+200	Qualification to playoffs
5	Barça	34	21	13	3133	2936	+197	Qualification to playoffs
6	Joventut Badalona	34	20	14	2892	2828	+64	Qualification to playoffs
7	Dreamland Gran Canaria	34	19 (Note: Dreamland Gran Canaria finished ahead of Baskonia on head–to–head point difference: Dreamland Gran Canaria 92–86 Baskonia, Baskonia 84–80 Dreamland Gran Canaria.)	15	2850	2830	+20	Qualification to playoffs
8	Baskonia	34	19	15	3026	3015	+11	Qualification to playoffs
9	UCAM Murcia	34	17 (Note: UCAM Murcia finished ahead of Baxi Manresa on head–to–head point difference: Baxi Manresa 80–74 UCAM Murcia, UCAM Murcia 81–71 Baxi Manresa.)	17	2796	2779	+17	
10	Baxi Manresa	34	17	17	2957	2884	+73	
11	MoraBanc Andorra	34	14	20	2980	3093	−113	
12	Casademont Zaragoza	34	13 (Note: Casademont Zaragoza finished ahead of Río Breogán on head–to–head point difference: Casademont Zaragoza 111–53 Río Breogán, Río Breogán 90–85 Casademont Zaragoza.)	21	3034	3087	−53	
13	Río Breogán	34	13	21	2692	2949	−257	
14	Bàsquet Girona	34	12	22	2793	3000	−207	
15	Hiopos Lleida	34	11 (Note: Hiopos Lleida finished ahead of Surne Bilbao Basket on head–to–head point difference: Hiopos Lleida 84–66 Surne Bilbao Basket, Surne Bilbao Basket 91–75 Hiopos Lleida.)	23	2807	2993	−186	
16	Surne Bilbao Basket	34	11	23	2783	2874	−91	
17	Coviran Granada	34	9	25	2760	2969	−209	Relegation to Primera FEB
18	Leyma Coruña	34	7	27	2938	3252	−314	Relegation to Primera FEB

Source: ACB
Rules for classification: 1) Win–loss record; 2) Head–to–head record; 3) Head–to–head point difference; 4) Point difference; 5) Points scored; 6) Sum of quotients of points scored (Note: Head–to–head record is used only after all the matches between the teams in question have been played)

==== Playoffs ====
Quarterfinals
1	Real Madrid	82	112	2
8	Baskonia	76	103	0
4	Unicaja	97	81	97	2
5	Barça	101	59	95	1
2	Valencia Basket	98	102	2
7	Dreamland Gran Canaria	74	94	0
3	La Laguna Tenerife	96	80	2
6	Joventut Badalona	81	60	0

Semifinals
1	Real Madrid	99	90	84	86	3
4	Unicaja	81	75	86	79	1
2	Valencia Basket	83	105	94	3
3	La Laguna Tenerife	65	74	87	0

Finals
1	Real Madrid	89	102	81	3
2	Valencia Basket	75	96	70	0

Source: ACB

=== Primera FEB ===
==== Regular season ====
Pos	Team	Pld	W	L	PF	PA	PD	Pts	Promotion, qualification or relegation
1	Silbö San Pablo Burgos	34	32	2	3011	2530	+481	66	Promotion to Liga ACB
2	Flexicar Fuenlabrada	34	27	7	2871	2595	+276	61	Qualification to playoffs
3	Movistar Estudiantes	34	26	8	2970	2710	+260	60	Qualification to playoffs
4	Real Betis Baloncesto	34	26	8	2838	2529	+309	60	Qualification to playoffs
5	Monbus Obradoiro	34	23	11	2787	2527	+260	57	Qualification to playoffs
6	Súper Agropal Palencia	34	22	12	2959	2737	+222	56	Qualification to playoffs
7	ODILO FC Cartagena CB	34	16	18	2627	2840	−213	50	Qualification to playoffs
8	Inveready Gipuzkoa	34	16	18	2667	2683	−16	50	Qualification to playoffs
9	Grupo Ureta Tizona Burgos	34	15	19	2987	3064	−77	49	Qualification to playoffs
10	Alimerka Oviedo Baloncesto	34	14	20	2673	2720	−47	48	
11	Aircargobooking Ourense	34	14	20	2796	2843	−47	48	
12	Grupo Alega Cantabria	34	13	21	2598	2811	−213	47	
13	HLA Alicante	34	13	21	2685	2696	−11	47	
14	Caja Rural CB Zamora	34	13	21	2674	2791	−117	47	
15	Hestia Menorca	34	11	23	2514	2660	−146	45	
16	UEMC Real Valladolid Baloncesto	34	11	23	2658	2909	−251	45	Relegation to Segunda FEB
17	Amics Castelló	34	10	24	2719	3014	−295	44	Relegation to Segunda FEB
18	CB Naturavia Morón	34	4	30	2430	2805	−375	38	Relegation to Segunda FEB

Source: FEB

==== Playoffs ====
Quarter-finals
2	Flexicar Fuenlabrada	92	83	90	3
9	Grupo Ureta Tizona Burgos	62	70	79	0
5	Monbus Obradoiro	87	72	94	83	1
6	Súper Agropal Palencia	83	85	101	92	3
3	Movistar Estudiantes	83	86	72	3
8	Inveready Gipuzkoa	71	84	68	0
4	Real Betis Baloncesto	95	77	83	88	87	3
7	ODILO FC Cartagena CB	94	85	87	80	68	2

Semi-finals
Flexicar Fuenlabrada	75
Súper Agropal Palencia	73
Movistar Estudiantes	82
Real Betis Baloncesto	86

Final
Flexicar Fuenlabrada	92
Real Betis Baloncesto	97

Source: FEB

=== Cup competitions ===
==== Copa del Rey ====
Quarterfinals; 13–14 February
Unicaja	100
Joventut Badalona	83
La Laguna Tenerife	91
Barça	86
Dreamland Gran Canaria	79
Valencia Basket	65
Real Madrid	92
Baxi Manresa	69

Semifinals; 15 February
Unicaja	90
La Laguna Tenerife	83
Dreamland Gran Canaria	63
Real Madrid	80

Final; 16 February
Unicaja	93
Real Madrid	79

==== Spain Cup ====
Semi-finals; 24 January
Monbus Obradoiro	86
Real Betis Baloncesto	71
ODILO FC Cartagena CB	79
Silbö San Pablo Burgos	101

Final; 25 January
Monbus Obradoiro	69
Silbö San Pablo Burgos	97

Source: FEB

==== Supercopa de España ====
Semifinals
Real Madrid	89
Barça	83
UCAM Murcia	78
Unicaja	84

Final
Real Madrid	80
Unicaja	90

== Women's basketball ==
=== Liga Femenina ===
==== Regular season ====
Pos	Team	Pld	W	L	PF	PA	PD	Pts	Qualification or relegation
1	Spar Girona	30	26	4	2438	1986	+452	56	Qualification to playoffs
2	Valencia Basket	30	24	6	2388	1907	+481	54	Qualification to playoffs
3	Perfumerías Avenida	30	22	8	2221	1965	+256	52	Qualification to playoffs
4	Casademont Zaragoza	30	20	10	2241	1971	+270	50	Qualification to playoffs
5	Hozono Global Jairis	30	18	12	2178	2013	+165	48	Qualification to playoffs
6	Movistar Estudiantes	30	17	13	2108	2103	+5	47	Qualification to playoffs
7	Club Joventut Badalona	30	16	14	2160	2172	−12	46	Qualification to playoffs
8	Baxi Ferrol	30	15	15	2065	2120	−55	45	Qualification to playoffs
9	Lointek Gernika Bizkaia	30	14	16	1963	2042	−79	44	
10	Spar Gran Canaria	30	12	18	1941	2099	−158	42	
11	Cadí La Seu	30	12	18	2023	2140	−117	42	
12	Durán Maquinaria Ensino	30	11	19	2072	2127	−55	41	
13	Kutxabank Araski	30	10	20	2061	2216	−155	40	
14	IDK Euskotren	30	10	20	1916	2089	−173	40	
15	Celta Femxa Zorka	30	9	21	1949	2238	−289	39	Relegation to LF Challenge
16	Osés Construcción	30	4	26	1827	2363	−536	34	Relegation to LF Challenge

Source: FEB

==== Playoffs ====
Quarter-finals
2	Valencia Basket	64	88	152
7	Club Joventut Badalona	60	81	141
3	Perfumerías Avenida	65	61	126
6	Movistar Estudiantes	60	54	114
1	Spar Girona	71	72	143
8	Baxi Ferrol	60	62	122
4	Casademont Zaragoza	68	78	146
5	Hozono Global Jairis	70	66	136

Semi-finals
2	Valencia Basket	76	75	151
3	Perfumerías Avenida	76	62	138
1	Spar Girona	50	88	138
4	Casademont Zaragoza	69	75	144

Final
2	Valencia Basket	75	71	2
4	Casademont Zaragoza	65	63	0

Source: FEB
