= 2026–27 Liga Femenina de Baloncesto =

64th season of the Spanish women's basketball league

Liga Femenina Endesa^{1}
- Season: 2026–27
- Matches played: 56
- Teams: 16

Records
- Biggest home win: Valencia 87–50 Ferrol (18 October 2026)
- Biggest away win: Gernika 72–108 Zaragoza (7 October 2026)
- Highest scoring: Gernika 72–108 Zaragoza (7 October 2026)
- All statistics correct as of 6 November 2026.^{1} Sponsored league name, referring to Endesa.

The 2026–27 Liga Femenina de Baloncesto, also known as Liga Femenina Endesa for sponsorship reasons, is the 64th season of the Spanish basketball women's league. It started on 3 October 2026 with the first round of the regular season and will end at the latest on 15 May 2027 with the finals.

Valencia Basket are the defending champions.

== Teams ==
=== Promotion and relegation (pre-season) ===
A total of 16 teams contest the league, including 14 sides from the 2025–26 season and two promoted from the 2025–26 LF Challenge.

On 18 April 2025, Azulmarino Mallorca Palma were promoted after achieving a win on the next-to-last round against Sernova Renovables Real Canoe. On 17 May 2026, Celta Femxa Zorka became the second team to achieve the promotion after beating Osés Construcción 63–53 in the final.

▲ Promoted from LF Challenge	▼ Relegated to LF Challenge
Azulmarino Mallorca Palma; Celta Femxa Zorka	Club Joventut Badalona; Spar Gran Canaria

=== Venues and locations ===
Location of teams in 2026–27 Liga Femenina

Team	Home city	Arena	Capacity
Azulmarino Mallorca Palma	Palma de Mallorca	Son Moix	4,000
Baxi Ferrol	Ferrol	A Malata	3,700
Cadí La Seu	La Seu d'Urgell	Palau d'Esports	800
Casademont Zaragoza	Zaragoza	Pabellón Príncipe Felipe	10,744
Celta Femxa Zorka	Vigo	Navia	1,500
Durán Maquinaria Ensino	Lugo	Pazo dos Deportes	5,310
Hozono Global Jairis	Alcantarilla	Fausto Vicent	1,240
Impulso 360 Estepona	Estepona	Pineda Lobilla	200
Innova-tsn Leganés	Leganés	Europa	4,254
Inversus Gernika Bizkaia	Gernika	Maloste	800
Kutxabank Araski	Vitoria-Gasteiz	Mendizorrotza	2,603
Mirai Euskotren	San Sebastián	José Antonio Gasca	2,500
Meins Avenida	Salamanca	Würzburg	3,000
Movistar Estudiantes	Madrid	Antonio Magariños	600
Spar Girona	Girona	Fontajau	5,200
Valencia Basket	Valencia	Roig Arena	15,600

== Regular season ==
=== League table ===
Pos	Team	Pld	W	L	PF	PA	PD	PCT	Qualification or relegation
1	Casademont Zaragoza	7	7	0	581	418	+163	1.000	Qualification to playoffs
2	Valencia Basket	7	6	1	575	454	+121	.857	Qualification to playoffs
3	Azulmarino Mallorca Palma	7	6	1	547	454	+93	.857	Qualification to playoffs
4	Hozono Global Jairis	7	6	1	508	430	+78	.857	Qualification to playoffs
5	Mirai Euskotren	7	5	2	491	452	+39	.714	Qualification to playoffs
6	Baxi Ferrol	7	5	2	510	530	−20	.714	Qualification to playoffs
7	Impulso 360 Estepona	7	4	3	469	450	+19	.571	Qualification to playoffs
8	Cadí La Seu	7	4	3	449	458	−9	.571	Qualification to playoffs
9	Inversus Gernika Bizkaia	7	4	3	541	562	−21	.571	
10	Meins Avenida	7	2	5	500	529	−29	.286	
11	Innova-tsn Leganés	7	2	5	432	486	−54	.286	
12	Movistar Estudiantes	7	2	5	467	526	−59	.286	
13	Spar Girona	7	1	6	463	498	−35	.143	
14	Celta Femxa Zorka	7	1	6	461	542	−81	.143	
15	Durán Maquinaria Ensino	7	1	6	426	526	−100	.143	Relegation to LF Challenge
16	Kutxabank Araski	7	0	7	425	530	−105	.000	Relegation to LF Challenge

Updated to match(es) played on 6 November 2026. Source: FEB
