= 2025–26 Liga Femenina de Baloncesto =

63rd season of the Spanish women's basketball league

Liga Femenina Endesa^{1}
- Season: 2025–26
- Matches played: 254
- Teams: 16

Regular season
- Top seed: Casademont Zaragoza
- Relegated: Club Joventut Badalona; Spar Gran Canaria

Finals
- Champions: Valencia Basket (4th title)
- Runners-up: Casademont Zaragoza
- Semi-finalists: Spar Girona; Perfumerías Avenida

Records
- Biggest home win: Jairis 120–62 Gran Canaria (1 February 2026)
- Biggest away win: Araski 40–87 Leganés (28 February 2026)
- Highest scoring: Ferrol 109–82 Gran Canaria (14 February 2026)
- ^{1} Sponsored league name, referring to Endesa.

The 2025–26 Liga Femenina de Baloncesto, also known as Liga Femenina Endesa for sponsorship reasons, was the 63rd season of the Spanish basketball women's league. It started on 4 October 2025 with the first round of the regular season and ended on 17 May 2026 with the finals.

Valencia Basket defended successfully the title by achieving its fourth consecutive league after sweep Casademont Zaragoza in the finals.

== Teams ==
=== Promotion and relegation (pre-season) ===
A total of 16 teams contested the league, including 14 sides from the 2024–25 season and two promoted from the 2024–25 LF Challenge.

On 29 March 2025, Osés Construcción were relegated after being defeated by IDK Euskotren, thus securing an immediate return to the LF Challenge. On 19 April 2025, Innova-tsn Leganés were promoted after achieving a win on the next-to-last round against Ingeniería Ambiental CAB Estepona. Despite being outside the relegation zone before the final round, Celta Femxa Zorka were relegated after two seasons in the top flight after losing to Valencia Basket and results failed to go their way. On 18 May 2025, Ingeniería Ambiental CAB Estepona became the second team to achieve the promotion after beating Unicaja Mijas 89–69 in the playoffs final.

▲ Promoted from LF Challenge	▼ Relegated to LF Challenge
Innova-tsn Leganés; Ingeniería Ambiental CAB Estepona	Celta Femxa Zorka; Osés Construcción

=== Venues and locations ===
Location of teams in 2025–26 Liga Femenina

Team	Home city	Arena	Capacity
Baxi Ferrol	Ferrol	A Malata	3,700
Cadí La Seu	La Seu d'Urgell	Palau d'Esports	800
Casademont Zaragoza	Zaragoza	Pabellón Príncipe Felipe	10,744
Club Joventut Badalona	Badalona	Palau Municipal d'Esports	12,760
Durán Maquinaria Ensino	Lugo	Pazo dos Deportes	5,310
Hozono Global Jairis	Alcantarilla	Fausto Vicent	1,240
IDK Euskotren	San Sebastián	José Antonio Gasca	2,500
Ingeniería Ambiental CAB Estepona	Estepona	Pineda Lobilla	200
Innova-tsn Leganés	Leganés	Europa	4,254
Kutxabank Araski	Vitoria-Gasteiz	Mendizorrotza	2,603
Lointek Gernika Bizkaia	Gernika	Maloste	800
Movistar Estudiantes	Madrid	Antonio Magariños	600
Perfumerías Avenida	Salamanca	Würzburg	3,000
Spar Girona	Girona	Fontajau	5,200
Spar Gran Canaria	Las Palmas	La Paterna	1,600
Valencia Basket	Valencia	Roig Arena	15,600

== Regular season ==
=== League table ===
Pos	Team	Pld	W	L	PF	PA	PD	Pts	Qualification or relegation
1	Casademont Zaragoza	30	27	3	2370	1978	+392	57	Qualification to playoffs
2	Spar Girona	30	24	6	2459	2031	+428	54	Qualification to playoffs
3	Valencia Basket	30	21	9	2286	1969	+317	51	Qualification to playoffs
4	Hozono Global Jairis	30	19	11	2203	1983	+220	49	Qualification to playoffs
5	Perfumerías Avenida	30	18	12	2083	2033	+50	48	Qualification to playoffs
6	Durán Maquinaria Ensino	30	16	14	2199	2170	+29	46	Qualification to playoffs
7	Innova-tsn Leganés	30	15	15	2065	2053	+12	45	Qualification to playoffs
8	Ingeniería Ambiental CAB Estepona	30	14	16	2175	2226	−51	44	Qualification to playoffs
9	Baxi Ferrol	30	14	16	2136	2211	−75	44	
10	Lointek Gernika Bizkaia	30	12	18	2234	2318	−84	42	
11	Movistar Estudiantes	30	12	18	2275	2294	−19	42	
12	IDK Euskotren	30	12	18	1962	2040	−78	42	
13	Cadí La Seu	30	11	19	2037	2259	−222	41	
14	Kutxabank Araski	30	11	19	1970	2201	−231	41	
15	Club Joventut Badalona	30	11	19	2143	2228	−85	41	Relegation to LF Challenge
16	Spar Gran Canaria	30	3	27	2105	2708	−603	33	Relegation to LF Challenge

Source: FEB

=== Results ===
Home \ Away	FER	CLS	CAZ	JOV	ENS	JAI	IDK	CAB	LEG	ARA	GER	EST	AVE	UNI	SGC	VBC
Baxi Ferrol	—	73–69	67–69	66–62	71–67	50–64	66–71	75–95	80–69	69–62	71–57	74–54	60–71	75–67	109–82	71–65
Cadí La Seu	61–89	—	69–82	76–65	71–61	63–72	42–77	89–70	64–72	71–66	74–64	79–68	69–70	64–82	73–71	73–74
Casademont Zaragoza	87–57	91–65	—	94–67	83–69	85–71	52–46	62–59	73–50	76–70	85–63	72–66	85–73	77–72	101–56	67–72
Club Joventut Badalona	77–80	92–83	85–97	—	69–63	69–67	70–57	69–74	71–65	74–80	76–63	69–86	69–67	64–71	88–76	71–84
Durán Maquinaria Ensino	73–68	84–57	70–67	72–57	—	58–81	61–51	87–80	69–63	62–56	85–83	84–79	73–65	90–95	102–66	75–78
Hozono Global Jairis	81–62	75–48	62–80	57–58	79–67	—	61–71	76–79	72–64	61–54	91–73	69–58	65–70	71–77	120–62	67–60
IDK Euskotren	67–51	70–75	73–83	75–68	79–74	53–72	—	83–60	60–73	50–55	72–73	82–70	61–80	58–84	60–56	69–57
Ingeniería Ambiental CAB Estepona	65–49	90–66	70–75	66–62	92–84	72–77	62–53	—	65–61	74–77	70–86	72–80	65–91	58–80	80–64	67–66
Innova-tsn Leganés	78–73	78–70	47–68	67–66	59–70	73–71	87–61	71–67	—	64–70	74–66	68–61	69–64	60–74	84–56	60–100
Kutxabank Araski	86–66	56–64	59–84	83–68	55–71	74–84	76–66	71–91	40–87	—	58–55	75–76	57–56	65–78	77–83	56–77
Lointek Gernika Bizkaia	77–86	63–75	97–83	80–64	84–69	74–78	80–75	76–81	62–76	93–61	—	89–88	86–75	72–62	109–78	67–68
Movistar Estudiantes	83–86	97–83	72–80	90–97	88–78	70–69	92–67	85–60	61–50	80–72	82–85	—	58–61	79–88	92–69	71–89
Perfumerías Avenida	81–75	69–57	63–76	68–67	66–63	53–65	57–65	63–49	71–68	68–72	85–60	71–68	—	83–79	91–59	58–57
Spar Girona	93–62	88–64	78–81	68–64	87–65	69–72	71–60	88–62	85–76	90–49	102–70	88–58	77–60	—	103–66	96–68
Spar Gran Canaria	93–81	73–79	57–82	70–108	79–83	73–92	63–76	78–106	54–93	73–77	87–74	84–102	78–79	67–93	—	66–111
Valencia Basket	85–74	77–44	53–73	83–57	62–70	64–61	69–54	82–74	89–59	90–61	87–53	84–61	81–54	71–74	83–66	—

Source: FEB
Legend: Blue = home team win; Red = away team win.

== Playoffs ==
=== Bracket ===
Quarter-finals
1	Casademont Zaragoza	84	90	174
8	Ingeniería Ambiental CAB Estepona	68	49	117
4	Hozono Global Jairis	65	55	120
5	Perfumerías Avenida	74	72	146
2	Spar Girona	82	89	171
7	Innova-tsn Leganés	82	63	145
3	Valencia Basket	85	73	158
6	Durán Maquinaria Ensino	72	70	142

Semi-finals
1	Casademont Zaragoza	67	67	134
5	Perfumerías Avenida	69	56	125
2	Spar Girona	66	73	139
3	Valencia Basket	67	73	140

Final
1	Casademont Zaragoza	73	67	0
3	Valencia Basket	81	68	2

Source: FEB

=== Quarter-finals ===
The first legs were played on 30 April and the second legs on 3 May 2026.

Team 1	Agg.	Team 2	1st leg	2nd leg
Casademont Zaragoza	174–117	Ingeniería Ambiental CAB Estepona	84–68	90–49
Spar Girona	171–145	Innova-tsn Leganés	82–82	89–63
Valencia Basket	158–142	Durán Maquinaria Ensino	85–72	73–70
Hozono Global Jairis	120–146	Perfumerías Avenida	65–74	55–72

Source: FEB

==== First leg ====
30 April 2026	Perfumerías Avenida	74–65	Hozono Global Jairis	Salamanca
18:00	Scoring by quarter: 26–18, 17–12, 10–18, 21–17
	Pts: Vilaró 19; Rebs: Cave 9 Asts: Martín 8 Eff: Vilaró 18	Boxscore	Pts: Alarcón; Rebs: three players 5 Asts: Ayuso 5 Eff: Alarcón, Bertsch 14	Arena: Würzburg; Attendance: 2,347; Referees: Jacobo Rial, Cristian Martín, José Javier Marqueta

30 April 2026	Innova-tsn Leganés	82–82	Spar Girona	Leganés
19:00	Scoring by quarter: 27–15, 22–28, 20–19, 13–20
	Pts: Sangare 29; Rebs: Sangare 8 Asts: Lahuerta 8 Eff: Sangare 37	Boxscore	Pts: Coulibaly 20; Rebs: Coulibaly, Pendande 11; Asts: Jocytė 5 Eff: Holm 25	Arena: Europa; Attendance: 1,095; Referees: Ángel de Lucas, Héctor Báez, Alejandro Aranzana

30 April 2026	Durán Maquinaria Ensino	72–85	Valencia Basket	Lugo
19:00	Scoring by quarter: 18–25, 16–18, 16–23, 22–19
	Pts: Tate 18; Rebs: Haidara 13; Asts: Flórez 7 Eff: Flórez 24	Boxscore	Pts: Fiebich 16; Rebs: Fiebich 9 Asts: Anderson 4 Eff: Fiebich 24	Arena: Pazo dos Deportes; Attendance: 1,304; Referees: Germán Morales, Josep María Olivares, Jorge Caamaño

30 April 2026	Ingeniería Ambiental CAB Estepona	68–84	Casademont Zaragoza	Estepona
20:00	Scoring by quarter: 17–21, 14–22, 20–18, 17–23
	Pts: Contell 23; Rebs: Dongue 10; Asts: Gretter 5 Eff: Contell, Dongue 22	Boxscore	Pts: Bankole 21; Rebs: Gueye 8 Asts: Voráčková 5 Eff: Gueye 24	Arena: Pineda Lobilla; Attendance: 720; Referees: Paula Lema, Juan Ramón Hurtado, Pol Franquesa

==== Second leg ====
3 May 2026	Valencia Basket	73–70 (158–142 agg.)	Durán Maquinaria Ensino	Valencia
18:00	Scoring by quarter: 11–22, 21–16, 21–17, 20–15
	Pts: Fam 15; Rebs: Carrera 8 Asts: Anderson 6 Eff: three players 17	Boxscore	Pts: Giomi, Haidara 20; Rebs: Haidara 12; Asts: Flórez, Tate 7 Eff: Haidara 24	Arena: Roig Arena; Attendance: 4,133; Referees: Francisco José Zafra, Jesús Marcos Martínez, José Carlos Sierra

3 May 2026	Spar Girona	89–63 (171–145 agg.)	Innova-tsn Leganés	Girona
18:10	Scoring by quarter: 30–18, 23–13, 22–12, 14–20
	Pts: Coulibaly, Holm 21; Rebs: Coulibaly 12; Asts: Guerrero, Jocytė 5 Eff: Coulibaly 32	Boxscore	Pts: Sangare 16; Rebs: Sangare 12; Asts: Lahuerta 5 Eff: Sangare 22	Arena: Fontajau; Attendance: 2,563; Referees: Asier Quintas, Jorge Baena, Rodrigo Palanca

3 May 2026	Casademont Zaragoza	90–49 (174–117 agg.)	Ingeniería Ambiental CAB Estepona	Zaragoza
18:30	Scoring by quarter: 30–12, 19–4, 19–24, 22–9
	Pts: Fingall, Gueye 15; Rebs: Gueye 10; Asts: Ortiz 8 Eff: Gueye 26	Boxscore	Pts: Dongue 19; Rebs: Ortega 7 Asts: Ortega 4 Eff: Dongue 11	Arena: Pabellón Príncipe Felipe; Attendance: 4,396; Referees: Víctor Mas, Sandra Sánchez, Jordi Domingo

3 May 2026	Hozono Global Jairis	55–72 (120–146 agg.)	Perfumerías Avenida	Alcantarilla
19:30	Scoring by quarter: 17–15, 9–18, 14–20, 15–19
	Pts: Bertsch 17; Rebs: Gil 11; Asts: Ayuso 6 Eff: Gil 27	Boxscore	Pts: Martín, Vilaró 13; Rebs: Takács-Kiss 11; Asts: Martín 8 Eff: Takács-Kiss 18	Arena: Fausto Vicent; Attendance: 1,451; Referees: Antonio Zamora, Mikel Cañigueral, Israel Chacón

=== Semi-finals ===
The first legs were played on 7 May and the second legs on 10 May 2026.

Team 1	Agg.	Team 2	1st leg	2nd leg
Casademont Zaragoza	134–125	Perfumerías Avenida	67–69	67–56
Spar Girona	139–140	Valencia Basket	66–67	73–73

Source: FEB

==== First leg ====
7 May 2026	Valencia Basket	67–66	Spar Girona	Valencia
19:00	Scoring by quarter: 14–20, 17–14, 21–14, 15–18
	Pts: Fiebich 16; Rebs: Buenavida 11; Asts: Carrera 3 Eff: Buenavida 18	Boxscore	Pts: Coulibaly 16; Rebs: Coulibaly 8 Asts: Cornelius; Eff: Holm 21	Arena: Roig Arena; Attendance: 3,738; Referees: Jacobo Rial, Fernando Ibáñez, Jaime Gómez

7 May 2026	Perfumerías Avenida	69–67	Casademont Zaragoza	Salamanca
20:30
	Pts: Martín 15; Rebs: Takács-Kiss 8 Asts: three players 2 Eff: Vilaró 19	Boxscore	Pts: Ortiz 12; Rebs: Fingall 8 Asts: Voráčková 4 Eff: Ortiz 12	Arena: Würzburg; Attendance: 2,726; Referees: Carlos García, Daniel Checa, Miquel Remisa

==== Second leg ====
10 May 2026	Casademont Zaragoza	67–56 (134–125 agg.)	Perfumerías Avenida	Zaragoza
12:15	Scoring by quarter: 19–10, 16–18, 18–20, 14–8
	Pts: Hempe 16; Rebs: Oma 11; Asts: Ortiz 4 Eff: Hempe 19	Boxscore	Pts: Martín 17; Rebs: Cave 10; Asts: Martín 4 Eff: Vilaró 12	Arena: Pabellón Príncipe Felipe; Attendance: 6,741; Referees: Francisco José Zafra, Jesús Marcos Martínez, Laura Piñeiro

10 May 2026	Spar Girona	73–73 (139–140 agg.)	Valencia Basket	Girona
19:00	Scoring by quarter: 28–20, 17–26, 15–10, 13–17
	Pts: Coulibaly 23; Rebs: Coulibaly 7 Asts: López 5 Eff: Coulibaly 32	Boxscore	Pts: Fam, Fiebich 17; Rebs: Carrera 9 Asts: Anderson 5 Eff: Fiebich 20	Arena: Fontajau; Attendance: 3,873; Referees: Leandro Lezcano, Juan Ramón Hurtado, Cristina Adán

=== Final ===
The first leg was played on 14 May and the second leg on 17 May 2026.

Team 1	Series	Team 2	1st leg	2nd leg	3rd leg
Casademont Zaragoza	0–2	Valencia Basket	73–81	67–68	—

Source: FEB

==== First leg ====
14 May 2026	Casademont Zaragoza	73–81 (Series: 0–1)	Valencia Basket	Zaragoza
21:00	Scoring by quarter: 23–21, 7–22, 19–16, 24–22
	Pts: Hempe 18; Rebs: Ortiz 7 Asts: Ortiz 8 Eff: Hempe 21	Boxscore	Pts: Hillsman 20; Rebs: four players 4 Asts: Fam 4 Eff: Buenavida 24	Arena: Pabellón Príncipe Felipe; Attendance: 8,068; Referees: Carlos García, Paula Lema, Cristina Adán

==== Second leg ====
17 May 2026	Valencia Basket	68–67 (Series: 2–0)	Casademont Zaragoza	Valencia
11:00	Scoring by quarter: 18–22, 15–14, 18–17, 17–14
	Pts: Anderson, Romero 14; Rebs: Carrera 9 Asts: Anderson, Carrera 3 Eff: Carrera 22	Boxscore	Pts: Ortiz 18; Rebs: Fingall, Gueye 6 Asts: Ortiz 6 Eff: Ortiz 22	Arena: Roig Arena; Attendance: 7,647; Referees: Ángel de Lucas, Francisco José Zafra, Israel Chacón

== Final standings ==
Pos	Team	Pld	W	D	L	Qualification or relegation
1	Valencia Basket (C, Y)	36	26	1	9	Qualification to EuroLeague regular season
2	Casademont Zaragoza (Note: Casademont Zaragoza qualified to the EuroLeague as regular season winners.) (X)	36	30	0	6	Qualification to EuroLeague regular season
3	Spar Girona	34	25	2	7	Qualification to EuroLeague qualifiers
4	Perfumerías Avenida	34	21	0	13	Qualification to EuroCup regular season
5	Hozono Global Jairis	32	19	0	13	Qualification to EuroCup regular season
6	Durán Maquinaria Ensino	32	16	0	16	Qualification to EuroCup regular season
7	Innova-tsn Leganés	32	15	1	16	Qualification to EuroCup regular season
8	Ingeniería Ambiental CAB Estepona	32	14	0	18	Qualification to EuroCup qualifiers
9	Baxi Ferrol	30	14	0	16	
10	Lointek Gernika Bizkaia	30	12	0	18	
11	Movistar Estudiantes	30	12	0	18	
12	IDK Euskotren	30	12	0	18	
13	Cadí La Seu	30	11	0	19	
14	Kutxabank Araski	30	11	0	19	
15	Club Joventut Badalona (R)	30	11	0	19	Relegation to LF Challenge
16	Spar Gran Canaria (R)	30	3	0	27	Relegation to LF Challenge

Source: FEB
(C) Champions; (R) Relegated; (X) Regular season winners; (Y) Cup winners
