= Alicia Flórez =

Spanish basketball player (born 2004)

- Flórez in 2026

No. 2 – Washington Mystics
- Position: Guard
- League: WNBA

Personal information
- Born: 19 April 2004 (age 22)
- Listed height: 5 ft 9 in (1.75 m)
- Listed weight: 166 lb (75 kg)

Career information
- Playing career: 2022–present

Career history
- 2022–present: Valencia Basket
- 2025–2026: Durán Maquinaria Ensino
- 2026–present: Washington Mystics
- Stats at Basketball Reference
Medals
Women's basketball
Representing Spain
World Cup
Bronze medal – third place	2026 Germany
FIBA Under-19 World Cup
Silver medal – second place	2023 Spain	Team
FIBA Under-16 European Championship
Silver medal – second place	2022 Portugal	Team
Women's 3x3 basketball
Representing Spain
FIBA 3x3 U18 World Cup
Silver medal – second place	2022 Hungary	Team

Alicia Flórez (born 19 April 2004) is a Spanish professional basketball player for the Washington Mystics of the Women's National Basketball Association (WNBA). She previously played for Valencia Basket of the Liga Femenina de Baloncesto. She is also a member of Spain women's national basketball team.

== Playing career ==
Flórez began her career with Valencia Basket of the Liga Femenina de Baloncesto. She was loaned to Durán Maquinaria Ensino for the 2025–26 season, where she averaged 11.8 points, 5.6 rebounds, 5.3 assists, and 1.9 steals per game in 32 games. On 19 June 2026, it was announced she would rejoin Valencia Basket for the 2026–27 season.

On 7 May 2026, Flórez signed a developmental contract with the Washington Mystics of the WNBA. She made her WNBA debut for the Mystics on 27 May 2026 against the Seattle Storm. During her debut she recorded nine points, five rebounds, three assists and two steals off the bench. In her second game on 29 May against the Los Angeles Sparks, she recorded five points, seven assists and zero turnovers. On 5 June 2026, she signed a standard contract with the Mystics. Through her first three games with the Mystics she averaged 7.3 points, 4.3 assists. 2.0 rebounds and 1.0 steals in 22.3 minute per game. On 2 July 2026, she scored a career-high 13 points against the Atlanta Dream.

== National team career ==
Flórez represented Spain at the 2022 FIBA U16 European Championship, where she averaged 5.6 points, 3.7 rebounds and 2.3 assists per game, and won a silver medal. On 12 July 2023, she was selected to represent Spain at the 2023 FIBA Under-19 Women's Basketball World Cup. During the first group stage game against Australia, she recorded 11 points, four rebounds, four assists and two steals.

On 24 July 2026, she was selected to represent Spain at the 2026 FIBA Women's Basketball World Cup. She joined the Spanish national team during the break for the 2026 FIBA Women's Basketball World Cup prior to the conclusion of the 2026 WNBA season.
