= Raquel Carrera =

Spanish basketball player

- Carrera with Spain in 2026

No. 14 – New York Liberty
- Position: Power forward
- League: WNBA

Personal information
- Born: 31 October 2001 (age 25) Ourense, Spain
- Listed height: 6 ft 3 in (1.91 m)

Career information
- WNBA draft: 2021: 2nd round, 15th overall pick
- Drafted by: Atlanta Dream
- Playing career: 2016–present

Career history
- 2016–2019: Celta Vigo
- 2019–2020: Araski AES
- 2020–2026: Valencia Basket
- 2026–present: New York Liberty

Career highlights
- EuroCup (2021); Europe SuperCup (2021); 4× Spanish League (2023, 2024, 2025, 2026); 3× Spanish SuperCup (2021, 2023, 2024); 2× Spanish Cup (2024, 2026); EuroBasket All-Star 5 (2025); MVP Spanish League Finals (2026); WNBA Commissioner's Cup (2026)
- Stats at WNBA.com
- Stats at Basketball Reference

Raquel Carrera Quintana (born 31 October 2001) is a Spanish professional basketball player for the New York Liberty of the WNBA. She previously played for Valencia Basket of the Liga Femenina de Baloncesto.

She was drafted by the Atlanta Dream with the 15th overall in the 2021 WNBA draft, but her draft rights were later traded to the New York Liberty. Carrera is the third highest Spanish player ever picked in the WNBA draft.

Carrera spent three years in Spain's Women's League 2 with Celta Zorka, where she averaged 12.3 points and 6.5 rebounds. She signed with Valencia in 2019 on a five-year contract. After signing with Valencia, Carrera spent a year with Araski while recovering from injury before returning to Valencia. In her first season with Valencia Basket she won the 2020-21 EuroCup Women scoring two last-second free-throws.

== EuroCup statistics ==
Winner

Season	Team	GP	MPP	PPP	RPP	APP
2020-21 EuroCup	Valencia Basket	7	20.7	6.9	3.4	1.0
2021-22 EuroCup	Valencia Basket					

== National team career ==
Carrera made her international debut at the 2016 FIBA Under-17 World Championship for Women when she was 14-years-old. She has competed in that tournament twice times, placing 6th in both. She also competed in European U16 tournaments, for which she won gold in 2016 and silver in 2017, and the European U18, for which she won silver in 2018. In 2021, Carrera was chosen to the Spanish Women's National Team, participating in the EuroBasket Women 2021 and the 2020 Summer Olympics. Up to end of the year, she had 19 caps, with 5.5 PPG:

She played at EuroBasket Women 2023, winning a silver medal.

- 6th 2016 FIBA Under-17 World Championship (youth)
- 2016 FIBA Europe Under-16 Championship (youth)
- 5th 2017 FIBA Europe Under-16 Championship (youth)
- 6th 2018 FIBA Under-17 World Championship (youth)
- 2018 FIBA Europe Under-18 Championship (youth)
- 7th 2021 Eurobasket
- 6th 2020 Summer Olympics
- 2023 Eurobasket
- 2025 Eurobasket

== Career statistics ==
Legend
GP	Games played	GS	Games started	MPG	Minutes per game	RPG	Rebounds per game
APG	Assists per game	SPG	Steals per game	BPG	Blocks per game	PPG	Points per game
TO	Turnovers per game	FG%	Field-goal percentage	3P%	3-point field-goal percentage	FT%	Free-throw percentage
**Bold**	Career best	°	League leader

=== WNBA ===
==== Regular season ====
WNBA regular season statistics
Year	Team	GP	GS	MPG	FG%	3P%	FT%	RPG	APG	SPG	BPG	TO	PPG
2026	New York	24	1	6.5	.609	.333	.643	1.2	.5	.2	.1	.3	1.7
**Career**	1 year, 1 team	24	1	6.5	.609	.333	.643	1.2	.5	.2	.1	.3	1.7

==== Playoffs ====
WNBA playoff statistics
Year	Team	GP	GS	MPG	FG%	3P%	FT%	RPG	APG	SPG	BPG	TO	PPG
2026	New York	1	0	2.0	—	—	—	.0	.0	1.0	.0	1.0	.0
**Career**	1 year, 1 team	1	0	2.0	—	—	—	.0	.0	1.0	.0	1.0	.0
