= Awa Fam =

Senegalese-Spanish basketball player (born 2006)

Awa Fam Thiam
- Fam in 2026

No. 11 – Seattle Storm
- Position: Center
- League: WNBA

Personal information
- Born: 17 June 2006 (age 20) Santa Pola, Alicante, Spain
- Listed height: 6 ft 4 in (1.93 m)

Career information
- WNBA draft: 2026: 1st round, 3rd overall pick
- Drafted by: Seattle Storm
- Playing career: 2021–present

Career history
- 2021–present: Valencia Basket
- 2024–2025: Gernika KESB
- 2026–present: Seattle Storm
- Stats at Basketball Reference
Medals
Women's basketball
Representing Spain
World Cup
Bronze medal – third place	2026 Germany
EuroBasket
Silver medal – second place	2025 Czech Republic/Germany/Italy/Greece
FIBA Under-20 European Championship
Silver medal – second place	2024 Lithuania	Team
FIBA Under-19 World Cup
Silver medal – second place	2023 Spain	Team
FIBA Under-17 World Cup
Silver medal – second place	2022 Hungary	Team
FIBA Under-16 European Championship
Silver medal – second place	2022 Portugal	Team

Awa Fam Thiam (born 17 June 2006) is a Spanish professional basketball player for the Seattle Storm of the Women's National Basketball Association (WNBA). She previously played for Valencia Basket of the Liga Femenina de Baloncesto.

== Early life ==
Fam was born in Alicante to Senegalese parents. Her parents, Madoumbe Fam and Arame Thiam, emigrated to Spain from their hometown of Guédiawaye, Senegal.

== Playing career ==
Fam made her debut for Valencia Basket on 2 December 2021. At 15 years, 5 months and 15 days old, she became the youngest player to ever play for Valencia. During her third career game she recorded 11 points, 12 rebounds, and four assists for her first career double-double, and finished with a player efficiency rating of 23. She was loaned to Gernika KESB for the 2024–2025 season. On 28 May 2025, she signed with Valencia Basket until 2029. During the 2025–26 season, she helped Valencia win their fourth consecutive Liga Femenina de Baloncesto championship.

=== WNBA ===
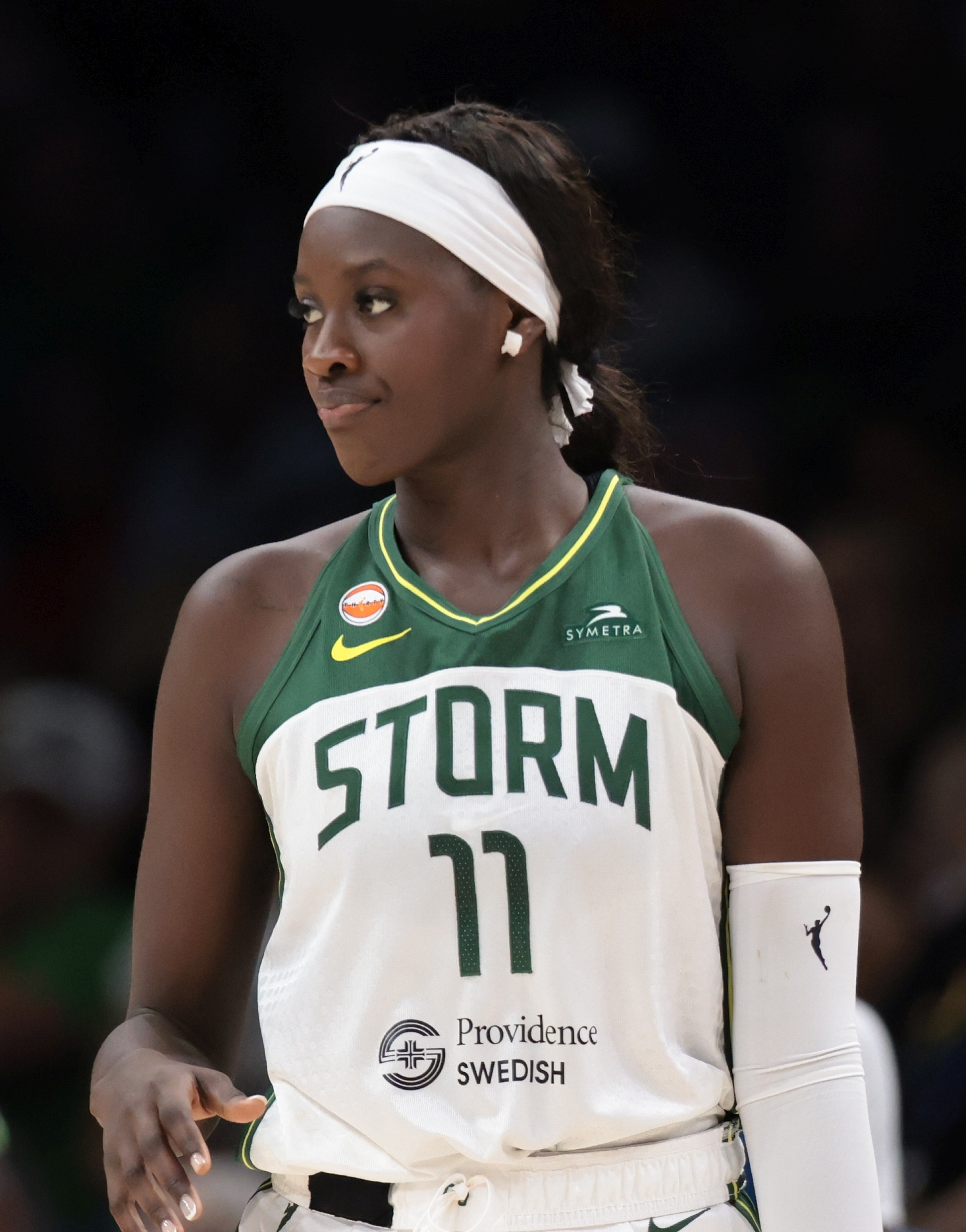
Fam with the Seattle Storm in 2026

On 13 April 2026, Fam was drafted third overall by the Seattle Storm in the 2026 WNBA draft. She tied Pau Gasol, who was drafted third overall in the 2001 NBA draft, for the highest draft position ever by a Spanish basketball player. Due to obligations with her Spanish basketball team she missed the Storm's first six games of the season.

She made her WNBA debut on 24 May 2026, against the Washington Mystics. During her debut she recorded ten points and two rebounds in 20 minutes off the bench. At 19 years old, she became the 14th teenager to play a game in WNBA history. She became the second teenager ever to score ten or more points in their WNBA debut. She made her first career start on 3 June 2026, against the Phoenix Mercury, and recorded a game-high 18 points, along with six rebounds, two assists, and two blocks in 33 minutes.

She recorded her first WNBA double-double on 22 July 2026, with 10 points and 10 rebounds against the Minnesota Lynx. In the regular-season finale on 23 September 2026, she scored a career-high 22 points in a 103–91 loss to the Dallas Wings. The Storm finished the season with an 8–36 record, the worst in the league. She finished her rookie season averaging 10.3 points, 5.9 rebounds and 1.8 assists in 27.7 minutes per game over 37 games, including 26 starts.

== National team career ==
In July 2022, Fam represented Spain at the 2022 FIBA U17 World Cup where she averaged 10.7 points, 9.9 rebounds and 2.6 assists per game. During the gold medal game against the United States, she scored eight points, a team-high eight rebounds and five assists and won a silver medal. The next month, she then represented Spain at the 2022 FIBA U16 European Championship, where she averaged a double-double of 13.1 points, 10.6 rebounds and 1.7 assists per game. During the gold medal game against France, she scored eight points and a game-high 12 rebounds and won a silver medal. She was subsequently named to the all-tournament team.

Fam represented Spain at the 2023 FIBA U19 World Cup where she averaged 10.7 points, 8.1 rebounds and 2.1 assists per game. During the gold medal game against the United States, she scored 11 points, five rebounds, three assists, and a game-high three blocks, and won a silver medal. She was subsequently named to the FIBA U19 World Cup All-Second Team.

Fam represented Spain at the 2024 FIBA U20 Women's EuroBasket, where she averaged 11.3 points, 7.6 rebounds, 3.9 assists and 1.6 steals per game. In the final against France, she recorded 20 points and 14 rebounds in an 83–75 loss and won a silver medal. She was named the tournament's MVP and to the All-Star Five.

With the senior Spain national team, Fam played at EuroBasket Women 2025, where she averaged 8.7 points and 4.2 rebounds per game and won a silver medal.

At the 2026 FIBA Women's Basketball World Cup in Berlin, she was the youngest player on Spain's roster. During the group phase she averaged 12.3 points and 6.3 rebounds per game and led the team in blocks. She recorded her first World Cup double-double, 16 points and 10 rebounds, against Japan. In the third-place game, she recorded 10 points, nine rebounds and three assists in an 81–58 win over Germany and won a bronze medal.
