= Mariona Ortiz =

Spanish basketball player

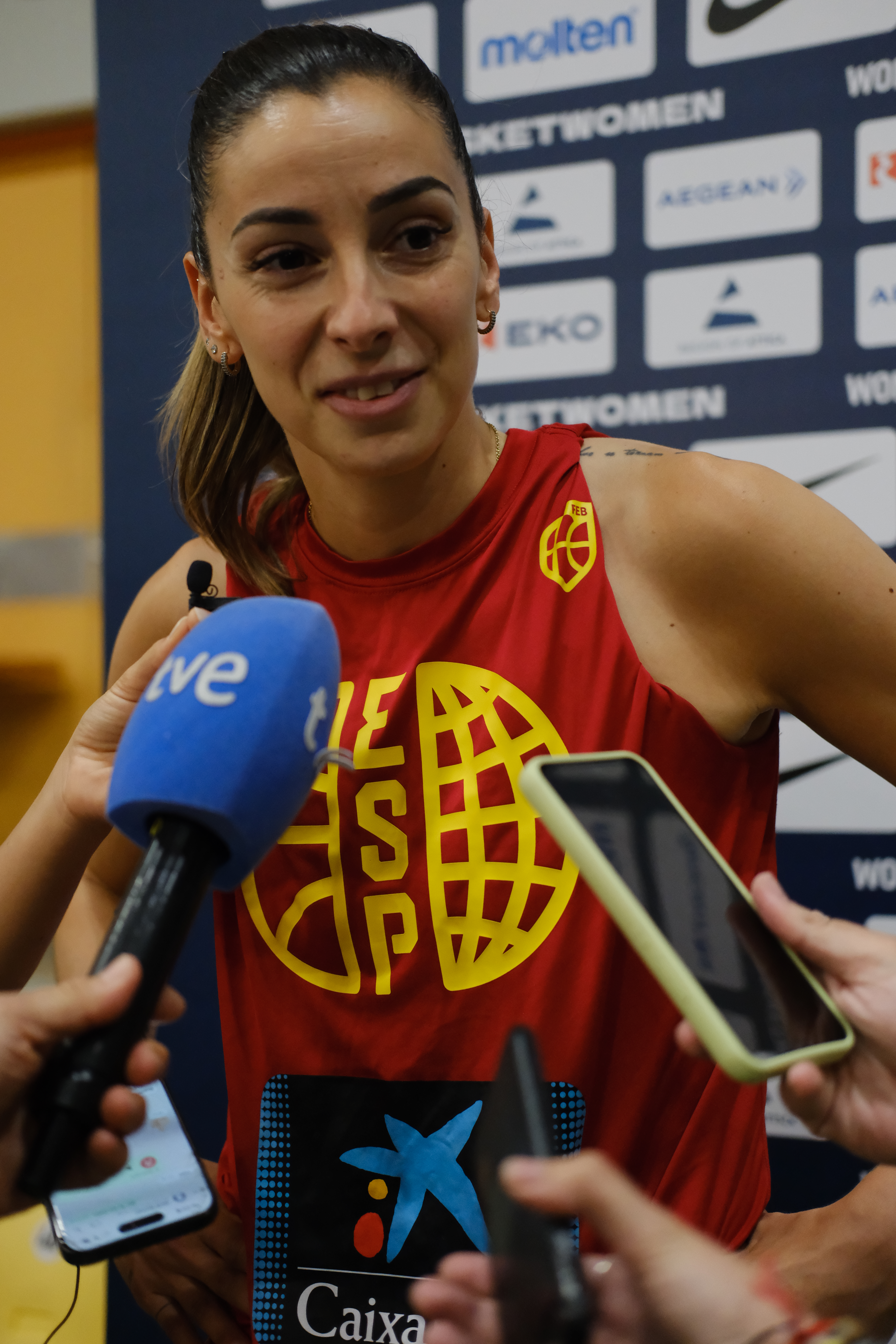

No. 4 – Basket Zaragoza
- Position: Point guard
- League: Liga Femenina

Personal information
- Born: 28 February 1992 (age 34) Calella, Spain
- Listed height: 1.82 m (6 ft 0 in)

Career information
- Playing career: 2010–present

Career history
- 2010–2011: Uni Girona CB
- 2011–2013: CD Zamarat
- 2013–2015: CB Avenida
- 2015–2016: CD Zamarat
- 2016–2017: CCC Polkowice
- 2017–2018: Basket Namur-Capitale
- 2018–2021: Royal Castors Braine
- 2021–2022: CB Estudiantes
- 2022–present: Basket Zaragoza

Mariona Ortiz Vives (born 28 February 1992) is a Spanish basketball player. She represented Spain at the 2024 Summer Olympics.
