= Elena Buenavida =

Spanish basketball player (born 2004)

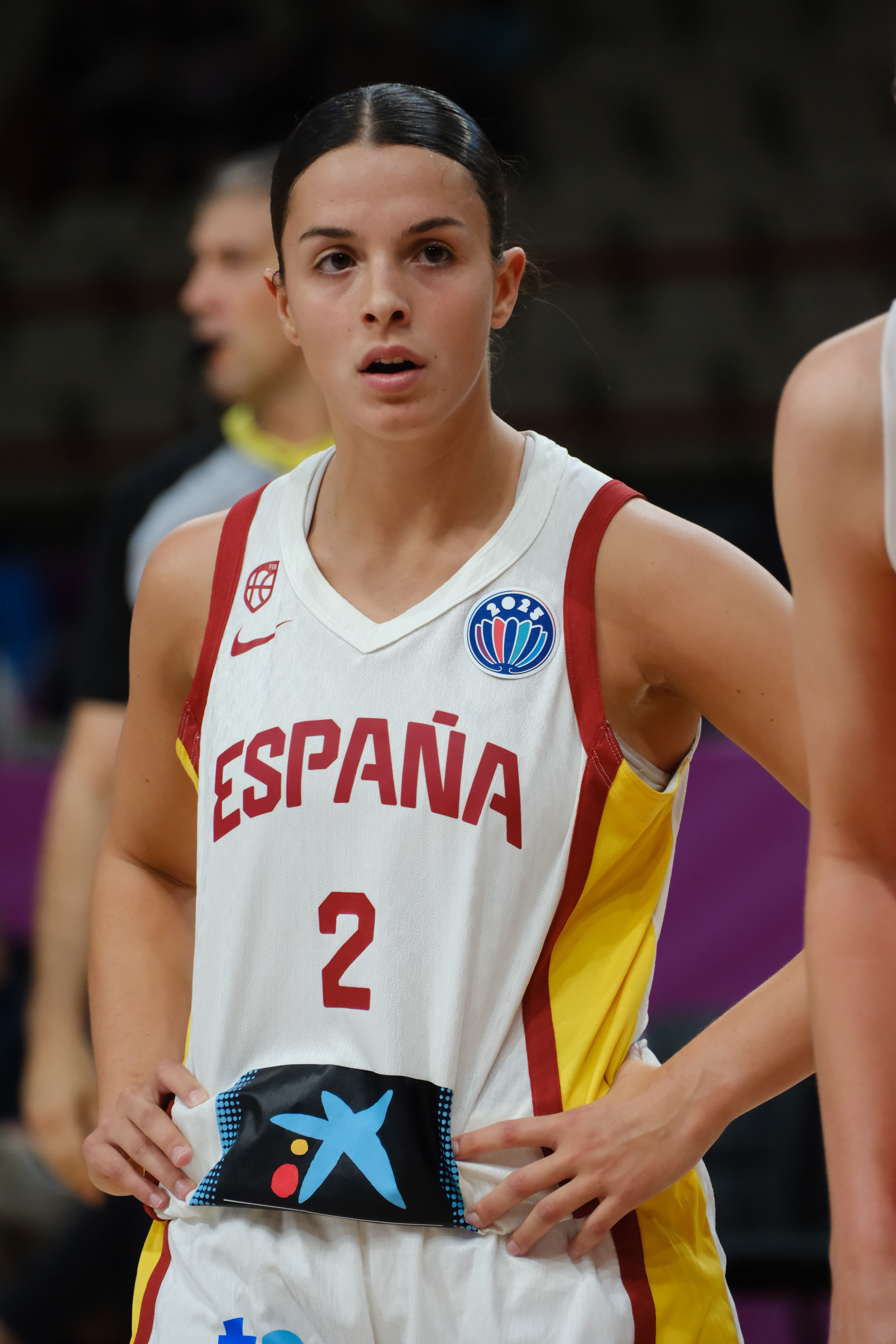

No. 6 – Minnesota Lynx
- Position: Point guard
- League: Liga Femenina Endesa

Personal information
- Born: 8 March 2004 (age 22) Santa Cruz de Tenerife, Spain
- Listed height: 1.74 m (5 ft 9 in)

Career information
- Playing career: 2020–present

Career history
- 2020–2022: Segle XXI
- 2022–2024: Valencia Basket
- 2024–2025: Lointek Gernika
- 2025–present: Valencia Basket
- 2026–present: Minnesota Lynx
- Stats at WNBA.com
- Stats at Basketball Reference

Elena Buenavida

Elena Buenavida Estévez (born 8 March 2004) is a Spanish basketball player for the Minnesota Lynx of the Women's National Basketball Association (WNBA). She also plays for Valencia Basket in the Liga Femenina Endesa. A regular in Spain's youth national teams, she won several international medals as a junior before making her senior debut in 2025 and taking the silver medal at EuroBasket Women 2025.

== Early life and youth career ==
Buenavida is from Granadilla de Abona, in the south of Tenerife in the Canary Islands. She came up through the youth system of CB Luther King in La Laguna, where she developed into one of the most promising players of her generation in the islands. In 2019 she was selected to join the high-performance academy of Segle XXI in Barcelona, a programme through which many Spanish internationals have passed. That same year she made her debut with a Spanish youth national team at the U16 European Championship held in Skopje, North Macedonia.

== Club career ==
=== Segle XXI ===
After moving to Catalonia, Buenavida came through the Segle XXI academy and made her professional debut in the Liga Femenina 2, Spain's second tier. In the 2021–22 season she emerged as one of the standout players of the competition, winning a weekly Most Valuable Player (MVP) award and averaging 14.6 points, 4.8 rebounds and 3.0 assists per game.

=== Valencia Basket ===
In 2022, Buenavida joined Valencia Basket, where she alternated between the first team in the Liga Femenina Endesa and the club's affiliate side, Club Nou Bàsquet Paterna, in the LF Challenge. Over her first two seasons with the club she played 99 official games and contributed to four titles, under a contract running until 2027.

In June 2024, Valencia Basket loaned Buenavida to Lointek Gernika for the 2024–25 season so that she could gain more playing time in the Liga Femenina Endesa. During the season she played 29 games, averaging close to 10 points, 3 rebounds and 2 assists in about 24 minutes per game.

Buenavida returned to Valencia Basket for the 2025–26 season, establishing herself in the rotation. She was named MVP of the opening game of the Liga Femenina Endesa finals, scoring 19 points. Valencia Basket went on to win the league title by defeating Perfumerías Avenida in the final.

== National team career ==
=== Youth ===
Buenavida has been a regular member of Spain's youth national teams in both the five-a-side and 3x3 formats. In August 2021 she was part of the Spanish squad at the FIBA U19 Women's World Cup in Hungary, where the team finished seventh.

Days later, also in Hungary, she helped Spain reach the final of the 3x3 U18 World Cup, where the team finished as runners-up after losing to the United States. Buenavida was named to the tournament's all-star team. Spain lost the final 14–21.

In September 2021 she won the 3x3 U17 European Cup, held in Lisbon, Portugal, where Spain beat Germany 15–7 in the final.

The following year, in July 2022, Buenavida won the gold medal at the U20 European Championship in Sopron, Hungary, where Spain defeated the Czech Republic 47–42 in the final. Weeks later, in August 2022, she took the silver medal at the U18 European Championship in Heraklion, Greece, where Spain lost the final to Lithuania 75–78. In that final she scored 36 points, the highest individual tally recorded in a U18 European Championship final.

In July 2023, Buenavida was part of the Spanish team that finished runner-up at the FIBA U19 Women's Basketball World Cup, held in Madrid, losing 66–69 to the United States in the final. In 2024 she added a silver medal at the U20 European Championship.

=== Senior ===
Buenavida made her senior national team debut in February 2025, playing in a qualifying game for the European Championship against Austria. She was then included in Miguel Méndez's squad for EuroBasket Women 2025, one of several newcomers in a young team, and won the silver medal after Spain lost the final to Belgium 65–67 in Athens.

In March 2026, Buenavida was named in Spain's 12-player squad for the Women's World Cup qualifying tournament held in San Juan, Puerto Rico, as Spain sought to return to the World Cup after an eight-year absence.
