= Liga Femenina Challenge =

Spanish women's second basketball league

LF Challenge
- Founded: 22 May 2021; 5 years ago
- First season: 2021–22
- Country: Spain
- Federation: Spanish Federation
- Confederation: FIBA Europe
- Number of teams: 16
- Level on pyramid: 2
- Promotion to: Liga Femenina
- Relegation to: Liga Femenina 2
- Current champions: Osés Construcción Ardoi (1st title) (2023–24)
- Website: www.lfchallenge.es

The Liga Femenina Challenge, simply known as LF Challenge, is the second division of league competition for Spanish women's basketball since the 2021–22 season.

As a single nationwide league below the top level, it is the female equivalent of the men's Primera FEB and is run by the Spanish Basketball Federation (FEB). It is played under FIBA rules.

The league is contested by 16 clubs. Each season, the top-finishing team in the LF Challenge are automatically promoted to the Liga Femenina. The teams that finish the season in 2nd to 9th place enter a playoff tournament, with the winner also gaining promotion to the Liga Femenina. The two lowest-finishing teams in the LF Challenge are relegated to Liga Femenina 2.

== History ==
On May 22, 2021, the Spanish Basketball Federation announced the creation of a new league between Liga Femenina and Liga Femenina 2 with the aim to make even the women's leagues with the men's leagues.

=== Champions ===
Season	Champion	Runner-up
2021–22	Barça CBS	Hozono Global Jairis
2022–23	Baxi Ferrol	Celta Femxa Zorka
2023–24	Osés Construcción Ardoi	Club Joventut Badalona
2024–25	Innova-TSN Leganés	CAB Estepona
2025–26	Azulmarino Mallorca Palma	
