= 2020–21 Liga Femenina de Baloncesto =

Women's basketball season in Spain

Liga Femenina Endesa^{1}
- Season: 2020–21
- Games played: 255
- Teams: 16

Regular season
- Relegated: Alter Enersun Al-Qázeres Extremadura; Quesos El Pastor

Finals
- Champions: Perfumerías Avenida (7th title)
- Runners-up: Valencia Basket
- Semifinalists: Spar Girona; Lointek Gernika Bizkaia

Records
- Biggest home win: Girona 85–37 Cáceres (11 January 2021); Avenida 91–43 Gernika (25 April 2021)
- Biggest away win: Cáceres 42–97 Avenida (2 October 2020)
- Highest scoring: Tenerife 103–102 Gran Canaria (20 September 2020)
- ^{1} Sponsored league name, referring to Endesa.

The 2020–21 Liga Femenina de Baloncesto, also known as Liga Femenina Endesa for sponsorship reasons, was the 58th season of the Spanish basketball women's league. It started on 19 September 2020 with the first round of the regular season and ended on 6 May 2021 with the finals.

It was the following season after the 2019–20 season was curtailed in response to the COVID-19 pandemic. Consequently, there were not relegations to Liga Femenina 2 and the league was expanded to 16 teams for this season.

== Format changes ==
For this season, the league was expanded to 16 teams and the first two rounds of the playoffs will be played in a two-legged tie, instead of previous seasons best-of-three playoff that are kept for the finals.

== Teams ==
=== Promotion and relegation (pre-season) ===
A total of 16 teams consisted the league, including the same 14 sides from the 2019–20 season and two promoted from the 2019–20 Liga Femenina 2.

Teams promoted from Liga Femenina 2

- Movistar Estudiantes
- ~~Snatt's Femení Sant Adrià~~ (resigned due to economical reasons and swapped place with Spar Gran Canaria)

=== Other changes ===
The professional team of Stadium Casablanca was integrated into Basket Zaragoza's structure to become its women's team. It played with its colours, name and crest.

=== Venues and locations ===
Location of teams in 2020–21 Liga Femenina
Location of teams from the Canary Islands in 2020–21 Liga Femenina

Team	Home city	Arena	Capacity
Alter Enersun Al-Qázeres Extremadura	Cáceres	Multiusos Ciudad de Cáceres	6,550
Cadí La Seu	La Seu d'Urgell	Palau d'Esports	800
Campus Promete	Logroño	Palacio de los Deportes	4,500
Casademont Zaragoza	Zaragoza	Pabellón Príncipe Felipe	10,744
Ciudad de La Laguna Tenerife	San Cristóbal de La Laguna	Santiago Martín	5,100
Durán Maquinaria Ensino	Lugo	Pazo dos Deportes	6,500
Embutidos Pajariel Bembibre PDM	Bembibre	Bembibre Arena	1,500
IDK Euskotren	San Sebastián	José Antonio Gasca	2,500
Kutxabank Araski	Vitoria-Gasteiz	Mendizorrotza	2,603
Lointek Gernika Bizkaia	Gernika	Maloste	800
Movistar Estudiantes	Madrid	Antonio Magariños	700
Perfumerías Avenida	Salamanca	Würzburg	3,000
Quesos El Pastor	Zamora	Ángel Nieto	2,200
Spar Girona	Girona	Girona-Fontajau	5,500
Spar Gran Canaria	Las Palmas	La Paterna	1,600
Valencia Basket	Valencia	La Fonteta	8,500

== Regular season ==
=== League table ===
Pos	Team	Pld	W	L	PF	PA	PD	Pts	Qualification or relegation
1	Perfumerías Avenida	30	29	1	2437	1765	+672	59	Qualification to playoffs
2	Valencia Basket	30	29	1	2267	1741	+526	59	Qualification to playoffs
3	Spar Girona	30	26	4	2304	1851	+453	56	Qualification to playoffs
4	Lointek Gernika Bizkaia	30	18	12	2020	1851	+169	48	Qualification to playoffs
5	Movistar Estudiantes	30	18	12	2086	1941	+145	48	Qualification to playoffs
6	Ciudad de La Laguna Tenerife	30	16	14	2022	2123	−101	46	Qualification to playoffs
7	Durán Maquinaria Ensino	30	15	15	2045	2121	−76	45	Qualification to playoffs
8	Spar Gran Canaria	30	13	17	2185	2273	−88	43	Qualification to playoffs
9	Cadí La Seu	30	13	17	1923	1986	−63	43	
10	IDK Euskotren	30	13	17	2030	2042	−12	43	
11	Kutxabank Araski	30	12	18	1882	1984	−102	42	
12	Campus Promete	30	11	19	1949	2101	−152	41	
13	Casademont Zaragoza	30	9	21	2044	2272	−228	39	
14	Embutidos Pajariel Bembibre PDM	30	8	22	1921	2164	−243	38	
15	Alter Enersun Al-Qázeres Extremadura	30	7	23	1827	2188	−361	37	Relegation to LF Challenge
16	Quesos El Pastor	30	3	27	1830	2369	−539	33	Relegation to LF Challenge

Source: FEB

=== Positions by round ===
The table lists the positions of teams after completion of each round. In order to preserve chronological evolvements, any postponed matches are not included in the round at which they were originally scheduled, but added to the full round they were played immediately afterwards.

Team ╲ Round	1	2	3	4	5	6	7	8	9	10	11	12	13	14	15	16	17	18	19	20	21	22	23	24	25	26	27	28	29	30
Perfumerías Avenida	6	10	1	1	1	1	1	1	1	1	1	1	1	1	1	1	1	1	1	1	1	1	1	1	2	2	1	1	1	1
Valencia Basket	3	2	2	2	2	2	2	2	2	2	2	2	2	2	2	2	2	2	2	2	2	2	3	3	3	3	3	3	2	2
Spar Girona	5	1	3	3	3	3	3	4	3	3	3	3	3	3	3	3	3	3	3	3	3	3	2	2	1	1	2	2	3	3
Lointek Gernika Bizkaia	12	3	7	6	6	6	6	6	6	6	6	6	5	5	4	4	5	5	5	4	4	4	4	4	4	6	5	6	4	4
Movistar Estudiantes	10	5	4	4	4	4	4	5	5	5	5	4	4	4	5	5	4	4	4	6	5	7	5	5	5	4	4	4	5	5
Ciudad de La Laguna Tenerife	7	11	6	5	5	5	5	3	4	4	4	5	6	6	6	6	6	6	6	5	6	5	7	7	7	5	6	5	6	6
Durán Maquinaria Ensino	9	13	8	12	7	7	8	10	8	10	8	9	9	9	8	8	9	8	8	7	7	6	6	6	6	7	7	7	7	7
Spar Gran Canaria	8	12	15	16	16	16	14	14	13	13	13	13	14	14	14	13	14	13	13	13	13	13	12	11	12	12	11	10	10	8
Cadí La Seu	15	15	9	7	8	10	10	8	9	9	10	10	10	10	9	10	11	10	9	10	10	9	9	9	8	8	10	11	11	9
IDK Euskotren	4	7	10	8	9	9	7	7	7	7	7	7	7	7	7	7	7	9	10	8	8	8	8	8	9	9	8	8	8	10
Kutxabank Araski	13	6	5	9	11	11	11	11	11	12	12	11	11	11	11	9	8	7	7	9	9	10	10	10	10	10	9	9	9	11
Campus Promete	1	9	11	10	10	8	9	9	10	8	9	8	8	8	10	11	10	11	11	11	11	11	13	13	13	13	13	12	12	12
Casademont Zaragoza	16	16	16	14	14	13	12	12	12	11	11	12	12	12	12	12	12	12	12	12	12	12	11	12	11	11	12	13	13	13
Embutidos Pajariel Bembibre PDM	11	14	12	11	13	14	15	16	15	15	16	16	15	15	15	15	15	15	14	15	15	15	15	15	15	14	14	14	14	14
Alter Enersun Al-Qázeres Extremadura	2	4	14	15	12	12	13	13	14	14	15	15	13	13	13	14	13	14	15	14	14	14	14	14	14	15	15	15	15	15
Quesos El Pastor	14	8	13	13	15	15	16	15	16	16	14	14	16	16	16	16	16	16	16	16	16	16	16	16	16	16	16	16	16	16

Leader and qualification to playoffs
Qualification to playoffs
Relegation to Liga Femenina 2

Source: FEB

=== Results ===
Home \ Away	ALQ	CAD	PRO	ZGZ	TFE	ENS	BEM	GIP	ARA	GER	EST	AVE	ZAM	GIR	GCA	VAL
Alter Enersun Al-Qázeres Extremadura	—	51–61	75–69	66–79	71–76	77–74	81–77	67–63	78–62	38–69	56–59	42–97	74–56	58–83	66–80	53–74
Cadí La Seu	81–69	—	73–69	60–57	59–67	65–78	66–54	67–62	55–67	58–50	64–61	57–80	58–68	50–71	82–69	67–77
Campus Promete	68–62	65–63	—	65–73	61–66	78–72	75–79	59–69	77–62	59–47	66–82	44–75	89–52	70–96	73–66	51–71
Casademont Zaragoza	77–71	70–69	104–60	—	61–80	66–74	79–75	74–82	77–81	76–87	64–85	71–77	70–60	76–80	56–88	62–91
Ciudad de La Laguna Tenerife	48–54	56–70	68–56	69–66	—	63–72	83–80	69–61	77–57	62–46	74–73	55–84	91–60	48–80	103–102	66–70
Durán Maquinaria Ensino	67–61	76–73	48–56	88–55	60–73	—	70–65	80–71	70–67	66–78	56–73	52–58	81–52	74–89	92–57	52–77
Embutidos Pajariel Bembibre PDM	68–55	61–74	63–80	66–63	55–62	68–65	—	65–76	52–54	62–49	71–78	64–81	79–59	46–77	79–69	58–84
IDK Euskotren	81–69	58–44	62–55	76–67	71–76	87–89	69–58	—	59–53	60–50	60–76	66–84	70–58	63–81	73–86	58–64
Kutxabank Araski	64–54	68–58	72–62	60–53	81–64	65–67	72–54	52–60	—	54–60	61–67	65–76	68–63	54–62	72–80	57–60
Lointek Gernika Bizkaia	86–60	80–61	58–51	87–47	85–62	84–62	70–45	71–65	79–70	—	77–74	62–93	80–55	60–69	78–64	54–59
Movistar Estudiantes	71–58	56–59	73–59	83–54	71–52	83–71	61–59	64–58	67–57	53–64	—	52–71	97–51	54–71	71–68	68–85
Perfumerías Avenida	92–50	70–50	89–49	92–73	76–36	80–45	76–45	80–76	86–49	72–64	63–58	—	91–58	79–61	107–66	71–69
Quesos El Pastor	63–54	55–72	55–94	71–82	99–84	55–62	68–78	66–82	59–60	57–80	55–82	64–87	—	71–109	72–80	52–78
Spar Girona	85–37	86–83	93–57	68–60	63–54	88–53	87–69	65–58	81–57	60–41	88–78	67–74	78–56	—	79–73	58–68
Spar Gran Canaria	70–64	74–71	59–71	78–82	81–78	80–83	89–73	72–66	58–63	73–72	70–65	70–92	83–61	72–74	—	60–74
Valencia Basket	88–56	61–53	74–61	83–50	98–60	77–46	92–53	81–68	69–58	64–52	79–51	85–84	76–59	58–55	81–48	—

Source: FEB
Legend: Blue = home team win; Red = away team win.

== Playoffs ==
Quarter-finals
1	Perfumerías Avenida	80	95	175
8	Spar Gran Canaria	61	62	123
4	Lointek Gernika Bizkaia	42	74	116
5	Movistar Estudiantes	47	64	111
2	Valencia Basket	69	82	151
7	Durán Maquinaria Ensino	58	54	112
3	Spar Girona	79	74	153
6	Ciudad de La Laguna Tenerife	45	67	112

Semi-finals
1	Perfumerías Avenida	77	91	168
4	Lointek Gernika Bizkaia	55	43	98
2	Valencia Basket	73	87	160
3	Spar Girona	64	74	138

Final
1	Perfumerías Avenida	64	76	76	2
2	Valencia Basket	67	74	61	1

Source: FEB

== Final standings ==
Pos	Team	Pld	W	L	Qualification or relegation
1	Perfumerías Avenida (C)	37	35	2	Qualification to EuroLeague regular season
2	Valencia Basket	37	34	3	Qualification to EuroLeague qualifying round
3	Spar Girona (Note: Spar Girona qualified to the EuroLeague by winning the Copa de la Reina.) (X)	34	28	6	Qualification to EuroLeague regular season
4	Lointek Gernika Bizkaia	34	19	15	Qualification to EuroCup group stage
5	Movistar Estudiantes	32	19	13	Qualification to EuroCup group stage
6	Ciudad de La Laguna Tenerife	32	16	16	Qualification to EuroCup group stage
7	Durán Maquinaria Ensino	32	15	17	Qualification to EuroCup qualification round
8	Spar Gran Canaria	32	13	19	Qualification to EuroCup qualification round
9	Cadí La Seu	30	13	17	
10	IDK Euskotren	30	13	17	
11	Kutxabank Araski	30	12	18	
12	Campus Promete	30	11	19	
13	Casademont Zaragoza	30	9	21	
14	Embutidos Pajariel Bembibre PDM	30	8	22	
15	Alter Enersun Al-Qázeres Extremadura (R)	30	7	23	Relegation to Liga Femenina Challenge
16	Quesos El Pastor (R)	30	3	27	Relegation to Liga Femenina Challenge

Source: FEB
(C) Champions; (R) Relegated; (X) Champion of the Copa de la Reina

== Awards ==
All official awards of the 2020–21 Liga Femenina de Baloncesto.

=== MVP ===
Pos.	Player	Team
C	(Montenegro) Markeisha Gatling	Casademont Zaragoza

=== National MVP ===
Pos.	Player	Team
PG	(Spain) Cristina Ouviña	Valencia Basket

=== All–League Team ===
Pos.	Player	Team
PG	(Spain) Cristina Ouviña	Valencia Basket
SG	(United States) Chelsea Gray	Spar Girona
SF	(United States) Tiffany Hayes	Perfumerías Avenida
PF	(United States) Katie Lou Samuelson	Perfumerías Avenida
C	(Montenegro) Markeisha Gatling	Casademont Zaragoza

=== Best Young Player Award ===
Pos.	Player	Team
PG	(Spain) Maite Cazorla	Perfumerías Avenida

=== Best Coach ===
Coach	Team
(Spain) Alberto Ortego	Movistar Estudiantes

=== Player of the round ===
==== Regular season ====
Round	Player	Team	Eff.	Ref
1	(United States) Brittany McPhee	Spar Gran Canaria	36	
2	(United States) Katie Lou Samuelson	Perfumerías Avenida	34	
3	(Mali) Sika Koné	Spar Gran Canaria	35	
4	(The Bahamas) Lashann Higgs	Embutidos Pajariel Bembibre PDM	30	
5	(United States) Merritt Hempe	Durán Maquinaria Ensino	36	
6	(Mali) Sika Koné (2)	Spar Gran Canaria	38	
7	(United States) Kai James	Spar Gran Canaria	34	
8	(United States) Asia Taylor	Ciudad de La Laguna Tenerife	37	
9	(United States) Asia Taylor (2)	Ciudad de La Laguna Tenerife	36	
10	(Spain) Rosó Buch	Lointek Gernika Bizkaia	24	
11	(Montenegro) Markeisha Gatling	Casademont Zaragoza	38	
12	(Serbia) Sonja Vasić	Lointek Gernika Bizkaia	28	
13	(The Bahamas) Lashann Higgs (2)	Embutidos Pajariel Bembibre PDM	31	
14	(The Bahamas) Lashann Higgs (3)	Embutidos Pajariel Bembibre PDM	32	
14	(Senegal) Maimouna Diarra	Campus Promete	32	
15	(United States) Katie Lou Samuelson (2)	Perfumerías Avenida	32	
16	(Spain) Laia Flores	Campus Promete	40	
17	(United States) Celeste Trahan-Davis	Valencia Basket	42	
18	(Spain) Vega Gimeno	Durán Maquinaria Ensino	38	
19	(Montenegro) Markeisha Gatling (2)	Casademont Zaragoza	35	
20	(United States) Sara Rhine	Embutidos Pajariel Bembibre PDM	27	
21	(Serbia) Aleksandra Stanaćev	Durán Maquinaria Ensino	33	
22	(Montenegro) Markeisha Gatling (3)	Casademont Zaragoza	42	
23	(Montenegro) Markeisha Gatling (4)	Casademont Zaragoza	31	
24	(United States) Arica Carter	Movistar Estudiantes	26	
25	(The Bahamas) Lashann Higgs (4)	Embutidos Pajariel Bembibre PDM	30	
25	(Mali) Sika Koné (3)	Spar Gran Canaria	30	
26	(United States) Abigail Wolf	Quesos El Pastor	28	
26	(Mali) Sika Koné (4)	Spar Gran Canaria	28	
27	(United States) Kai James (2)	Spar Gran Canaria	31	
28	(Spain) María Araújo	Spar Girona	32	
29	(United States) Chatrice White	Durán Maquinaria Ensino	34	
30	(Mali) Mariam Coulibaly	IDK Euskotren	36	

==== Quarter-finals ====
Round	Player	Team	Eff.	Ref
1st leg	(Nigeria) Adaora Elonu	Spar Girona	32	
2nd leg	(United States) Celeste Trahan-Davis (2)	Valencia Basket	35	

==== Semi-finals ====
Round	Player	Team	Eff.	Ref
1st leg	(Spain) Cristina Ouviña	Valencia Basket	25	
2nd leg	(Australia) Rebecca Allen	Valencia Basket	30	

==== Final ====
Round	Player	Team	Eff.	Ref
1st leg	(Spain) Raquel Carrera	Valencia Basket	24	
2nd leg	(United States) Tiffany Hayes	Perfumerías Avenida	21	
3rd leg	(United States) Katie Lou Samuelson (3)	Perfumerías Avenida	25	

== Spanish clubs in international competitions ==
FIBA Europe competitions
Team	Competition	Progress	Result	W–L
Perfumerías Avenida	EuroLeague	Final	Loss vs. (Russia) UMMC Ekaterinburg	9–1
Perfumerías Avenida	EuroLeague	Semi-finals	Win vs. (Hungary) Sopron Basket	9–1
Perfumerías Avenida	EuroLeague	Quarter-finals	Win vs. (Spain) Spar Girona	9–1
Perfumerías Avenida	EuroLeague	Regular season Group A	1st of 4 teams (6–0)	9–1
Spar Girona	EuroLeague	Quarter-finals	Loss vs. (Spain) Perfumerías Avenida	4–5
Spar Girona	EuroLeague	Regular season Group C	2nd of 4 teams (3–3)	4–5
Spar Girona	EuroLeague	Qualifying round	Win vs. (Romania) ACS Sepsi SIC	4–5
Valencia Basket	EuroCup	Final	Win vs. (Italy) Reyer Venezia	7–0
Valencia Basket	EuroCup	Semi-finals	Win vs. (France) Flammes Carolo Basket	7–0
Valencia Basket	EuroCup	Quarter-finals	Win vs. (France) ESBVA-LM	7–0
Valencia Basket	EuroCup	Round of 16	Win vs. (Hungary) Aluinvent DVTK Miskolc	7–0
Valencia Basket	EuroCup	Group stage Group H	1st of 4 teams (3–0)	7–0
Lointek Gernika Bizkaia	EuroCup	Round of 16	Loss vs. (Romania) ACS Sepsi SIC	2–2
Lointek Gernika Bizkaia	EuroCup	Group stage Group F	2nd of 4 teams (2–1)	2–2
Cadí La Seu	EuroCup	Group stage Group G	3rd of 4 teams (2–1)	2–1
Ciudad de La Laguna Tenerife	EuroCup	Group stage Group F	3rd of 4 teams (2–1)	3–1
Ciudad de La Laguna Tenerife	EuroCup	Qualification round	Win vs. (Belgium) Kangoeroes Mechelen	3–1
