= 2019–20 Liga Femenina de Baloncesto =

Liga Femenina Endesa^{1}
- Season: 2019–20
- Games played: 154
- Teams: 14

Regular season
- Relegated: None (Note: Relegations to LEB Oro were revoked due to the COVID-19 pandemic.)

Finals
- Champions: None (Note: The league champion was declared null and void due to the COVID-19 pandemic.)

Records
- Biggest home win: Avenida 89–37 Tenerife (4 January 2020)
- Biggest away win: Bembibre 39–93 Avenida (11 January 2020)
- Highest scoring: Zamora 103–102 Casablanca (1 March 2020)
- Winning streak: 11 games Perfumerías Avenida
- Losing streak: 9 games Quesos El Pastor
- ^{1} Sponsored league name, referring to Endesa.

The 2019–20 Liga Femenina de Baloncesto, also known as Liga Femenina Endesa for sponsorship reasons, was the 57th season of the Spanish basketball women's league. It started on 28 September 2019 with the first round of the regular season and was declared null and void on 8 May 2020 due to the COVID-19 pandemic.

== Teams ==
=== Promotion and relegation (pre-season) ===
A total of 14 teams contested the league, including 12 sides from the 2018–19 season, and two promoted from the 2018–19 Liga Femenina 2.

Teams promoted from Liga Femenina 2

- Campus Promete
- Ciudad de La Laguna Tenerife

=== Venues and locations ===
Location of teams in 2019–20 Liga Femenina
Location of teams from the Canary Islands in 2019–20 Liga Femenina

Team	Home city	Arena	Capacity
Cadí La Seu	La Seu d'Urgell	Palau d'Esports	800
Campus Promete	Logroño	Lobete	2,500
Ciudad de La Laguna Tenerife	San Cristóbal de La Laguna	Santiago Martín	5,100
Durán Maquinaria Ensino	Lugo	Pazo dos Deportes	6,500
Embutidos Pajariel Bembibre PDM	Bembibre	Bembibre Arena	1,500
IDK Euskotren	San Sebastián	José Antonio Gasca	2,000
Lointek Gernika Bizkaia	Gernika	Maloste	700
Mann Filter Casablanca	Zaragoza	Eduardo Lastrada	800
Nissan Al-Qázeres Extremadura	Cáceres	Juan Serrano Macayo	1,200
Perfumerías Avenida	Salamanca	Würzburg	3,000
Quesos El Pastor	Zamora	Ángel Nieto	1,500
RPK Araski	Vitoria-Gasteiz	Mendizorrotza	2,603
Spar CityLift Girona	Girona	Girona-Fontajau	5,500
Valencia Basket	Valencia	Fuente de San Luis	9,000

== Season summary ==
On March 10, 2020, the Government of Spain decreed that all games would be played behind closed doors due to the COVID-19 pandemic. On March 12, 2020, the Spanish Basketball Federation postponed all the games of the next two weeks. On March 18, 2020, the Spanish Basketball Federation extended the postponement of the games until March 29 due to the state of alarm. On March 25, 2020, the Spanish Basketball Federation extended the postponement of the games until April 12 due to the extension of state of alarm. On April 27, 2020, the Spanish Basketball Federation agreed with the Liga Femenina clubs to revoke relegations to Liga Femenina 2 and allow promotions from Liga Femenina 2 expanding the league for the next season to 16 teams with the discrepancies of some clubs.

On May 8, 2020, the Spanish Basketball Federation finished prematurely the regular season due to force majeure with the following decisions:

- Relegations to Liga Femenina 2 were revoked.
- Promotions from Liga Femenina 2 remained.
- The league champion was declared null and void.
- The final standings was fixed according to the standings as of March 1 for the allocation of places for European competitions.

== Regular season ==
=== League table ===
Pos	Team	Pld	W	L	PF	PA	PD	Pts	Qualification
1	Perfumerías Avenida	22	19	3	1638	1172	+466	41	Qualification to EuroLeague regular season
2	Spar CityLift Girona	22	18	4	1428	1198	+230	40	Qualification to EuroLeague qualifying round
3	Lointek Gernika Bizkaia	22	17	5	1550	1314	+236	39	Qualification to EuroCup group stage
4	Valencia Basket	22	14	8	1436	1323	+113	36	Qualification to EuroCup group stage
5	RPK Araski (Note: RPK Araski resigned to play European competitions.)	22	12	10	1363	1345	+18	34	
6	Cadí La Seu	22	11	11	1448	1433	+15	33	Qualification to EuroCup group stage
7	Durán Maquinaria Ensino	22	11	11	1434	1432	+2	33	
8	Ciudad de La Laguna Tenerife	22	11	11	1481	1599	−118	33	Qualification to EuroCup qualification round
9	Mann Filter Casablanca	22	9	13	1381	1509	−128	31	
10	Campus Promete	22	8	14	1298	1387	−89	30	
11	IDK Euskotren	22	8	14	1353	1437	−84	30	
12	Nissan Al-Qázeres Extremadura	22	6	16	1230	1493	−263	28	
13	Quesos El Pastor	22	6	16	1393	1581	−188	28	
14	Embutidos Pajariel Bembibre PDM	22	4	18	1245	1455	−210	26	

Source: FEB

=== Positions by round ===
The table lists the positions of teams after completion of each round. In order to preserve chronological evolvements, any postponed matches are not included in the round at which they were originally scheduled, but added to the full round they were played immediately afterwards. For example, if a match is scheduled for round 13, but then postponed and played between rounds 16 and 17, it will be added to the standings for round 16.

Team ╲ Round	1	2	3	4	5	6	7	8	9	10	11	12	13	14	15	16	17	18	19	20	21	22
Perfumerías Avenida	1	1	1	1	1	1	2	2	2	2	2	2	2	2	2	2	1	1	1	1	1	1
Spar CityLift Girona	3	2	2	2	2	2	1	1	1	1	1	1	1	1	1	1	2	3	3	3	2	2
Lointek Gernika	7	3	5	4	3	4	4	4	3	3	3	3	4	4	4	4	3	2	2	2	3	3
Valencia Basket	12	5	4	3	4	3	3	3	4	4	4	4	3	3	3	3	4	4	4	4	4	4
RPK Araski	2	6	8	7	8	7	7	6	7	7	7	6	7	7	5	5	5	5	5	5	5	5
Cadí La Seu	6	4	3	5	7	5	5	5	5	6	6	5	6	5	6	6	6	8	8	7	6	6
Durán Maquinaria Ensino	9	14	11	11	13	12	10	9	10	8	8	8	8	8	8	8	7	6	6	6	7	7
Ciudad de La Laguna Tenerife	5	9	7	6	6	6	6	7	6	5	5	7	5	6	7	7	8	9	9	8	8	8
Mann Filter Casablanca	14	13	13	10	9	9	9	11	9	11	9	10	9	10	10	9	9	7	7	9	9	9
Campus Promete	10	8	9	12	10	10	11	12	11	12	12	12	12	11	12	10	10	10	10	10	10	10
IDK Euskotren	11	11	12	13	12	11	12	10	12	10	11	11	11	12	11	11	11	11	11	11	11	11
Nissan Al-Qázeres	8	7	6	8	5	8	8	8	8	9	10	9	10	9	9	12	12	12	12	12	12	12
Quesos El Pastor	4	10	10	9	11	13	13	13	14	14	13	13	13	13	13	13	13	13	13	13	13	13
Embutidos Pajariel Bembibre	13	12	14	14	14	14	14	14	13	13	14	14	14	14	14	14	14	14	14	14	14	14

Leader and qualification to playoffs
Qualification to playoffs
Relegation to Liga Femenina 2

Source: FEB

=== Results ===
Home \ Away	CAD	PRO	TFE	ENS	BEM	GIP	GER	MAN	ALQ	AVE	ZAM	ARA	GIR	VAL
Cadí La Seu	—	61–81	81–57	74–68	77–81	55–56	67–74	71–62	91–50	37–73		61–59	54–56	51–66
Campus Promete	59–78	—	60–68	55–60	57–49	69–77			49–51	57–66	64–59	59–51	57–73	62–40
Ciudad de La Laguna Tenerife	72–83	58–77	—		76–61	67–66	62–72	81–82	68–63	57–84		86–78	61–79	75–58
Durán Maquinaria Ensino	60–68	76–55	64–52	—		70–61	47–72		100–52	68–62	59–46	68–72	77–70	70–73
Embutidos Pajariel Bembibre	69–61	52–56	55–61	57–69	—	63–70	60–75	62–53	72–42	39–93	54–67	53–66		
IDK Euskotren		43–57	71–72	59–58	68–59	—		61–62	80–72	58–82	66–76	56–62	45–67	57–58
Lointek Gernika	66–43	74–57	78–80	67–48	60–55	67–70	—	78–58	66–59		82–56		60–69	91–89
Mann Filter Casablanca	61–65	72–67	74–66	71–68	58–51	57–48	48–68	—	66–57	53–84	83–75			42–69
Nissan Al-Qázeres	68–74		61–56		74–60	59–55	50–81	70–68	—	55–69	50–53	45–67	42–70	40–57
Perfumerías Avenida	71–61		89–37	80–50	87–50		63–59	74–45		—	96–52	70–46	57–68	61–58
Quesos El Pastor	60–76	67–64	94–98	73–79		73–67	62–70	103–102	64–67	63–82	—	63–65	31–65	
RPK Araski	64–59	72–53		52–68	67–42	79–64	40–59	65–60		42–60	69–59	—	56–68	61–69
Spar CityLift Girona		64–51		66–58	62–48	53–55	65–68	52–40	61–55	60–55	61–48	59–68	—	67–52
Valencia Basket		76–32	69–71	95–49	56–53		66–63	74–64	66–48	57–82	62–49	64–62	62–73	—

Source: FEB
Legend: Blue = home team win; Red = away team win.

== Awards ==
All official awards of the 2019–20 Liga Femenina de Baloncesto.

=== MVP ===
Pos.	Player	Team
C	(United States) Tinara Moore	Cadí La Seu

=== National MVP ===
Pos.	Player	Team
SG	(Spain) Queralt Casas	Valencia Basket

=== All–League Team ===
Pos.	Player	Team
PG	(Spain) Silvia Domínguez	Perfumerías Avenida
SG	(Spain) Queralt Casas	Valencia Basket
SF	(United States) Julie Wojta	Lointek Gernika Bizkaia
PF	(United States) Tanaya Atkinson	Ciudad de La Laguna Tenerife
C	(United States) Tinara Moore	Cadí La Seu

=== Best Young Player Award ===
Pos.	Player	Team
C	(Spain) Raquel Carrera	RPK Araski

=== Best Coach ===
Coach	Team
(Spain) Madelen Urieta	RPK Araski

=== Player of the round ===
==== Regular season ====
Round	Player	Team	Eff.	Ref
1	(United States) Brittany McPhee	Quesos El Pastor	32	
2	(United States) Lyndra Weaver	Ciudad de La Laguna Tenerife	28	
3	(United States) Tanaya Atkinson	Ciudad de La Laguna Tenerife	36	
4	(United States) Brittany McPhee (2)	Quesos El Pastor	28	
5	(United States) Brittany McPhee (3)	Quesos El Pastor	37	
5	(United States) Lyndra Weaver (2)	Ciudad de La Laguna Tenerife	37	
6	(United States) Cierra Dillard	Mann Filter Casablanca	28	
7	(France) Magali Mendy	Spar CityLift Girona	28	
8	(United States) Tinara Moore	Cadí La Seu	32	
9	(United States) Blake Dietrick	Lointek Gernika Bizkaia	29	
9	(Mali) Meiya Tireira	Valencia Basket	29	
10	(Canada) Quinn Dornstauder	Quesos El Pastor	39	
11	(Nigeria) Atonye Nyingifa	Durán Maquinaria Ensino	31	
12	(United States) Tinara Moore (2)	Cadí La Seu	40	
13	(United States) Jennie Simms	Nissan Al-Qázeres Extremadura	27	
13	(Mozambique) Leia Dongue	Campus Promete	27	
14	(Mozambique) Tamara Seda	RPK Araski	31	
15	(Senegal) Toch Sarr	IDK Euskotren	28	
16	(Serbia) Nikolina Milić	Lointek Gernika Bizkaia	28	
17	(Nigeria) Atonye Nyingifa (2)	Durán Maquinaria Ensino	27	
17	(Jamaica) Shereesha Richards	Durán Maquinaria Ensino	27	
18	(Serbia) Nikolina Milić (2)	Lointek Gernika Bizkaia	33	
19	(Serbia) Nikolina Milić (3)	Lointek Gernika Bizkaia	28	
20	(Nigeria) Atonye Nyingifa (3)	Durán Maquinaria Ensino	26	
20	(Mozambique) Tamara Seda (2)	RPK Araski	26	
20	(United States) Tinara Moore (3)	Cadí La Seu	26	
21	(Canada) Quinn Dornstauder (2)	Quesos El Pastor	28	
22	(United States) Ariel Edwards	IDK Euskotren	28	
22	(Spain) Laura García	IDK Euskotren	28	
22	(Netherlands) Laura Cornelius	Quesos El Pastor	28	
22	(United States) Merritt Hempe	Mann Filter Casablanca	28	

== Spanish clubs in international competitions ==
FIBA Europe competitions
Team	Competition	Progress	Result
Spar CityLift Girona	EuroLeague	Regular season Group B	6th of 8 teams (6–8)
Spar CityLift Girona	EuroCup	Quarter-finals	0–0
Perfumerías Avenida	EuroCup	Quarter-finals	10–0
Valencia Basket	EuroCup	Quarter-finals	9–1
Lointek Gernika Bizkaia	EuroCup	Round of 8	7–5
Cadí La Seu	EuroCup	Round of 16	6–4
