= 2020–21 EuroLeague Women =

EuroLeague Women
- Season: 2020–21
- Dates: Qualifying: 28 October 2020; Competition proper: 1 December 2020 – 18 April 2021
- Teams: Competition proper: 16; Total: 18

Regular season
- Season MVP: (Ukraine) Alina Iagupova (Fenerbahçe Öznur Kablo)

Finals
- Champions: (Russia) UMMC Ekaterinburg (6th title)
- Runners-up: (Spain) Perfumerías Avenida
- Third place: (Turkey) Fenerbahçe
- Fourth place: (Hungary) Sopron Basket
- Final Four MVP: (United States) Breanna Stewart (UMMC Ekaterinburg)

The 2020–21 EuroLeague Women was the 63rd edition of the European women's club basketball championship organized by FIBA, and the 25th edition since being rebranded as the EuroLeague Women.

== Team allocation ==
A total of 18 teams from 10 countries participated in the 2020–21 EuroLeague Women.

=== Teams ===
League positions of the previous season shown in parentheses:

- Abd-: League positions of abandoned season due to the COVID-19 pandemic as determined by the leagues

Regular season
(Czech Republic) ZVVZ USK Praha (Abd-1st)	(Poland) VBW Arka Gdynia (Abd-1st)
(France) LDLC ASVEL Féminin (Abd)	(Russia) UMMC Ekaterinburg (Abd-1st)
(France) Tango Bourges Basket (Abd)	(Russia) Dynamo Kursk (Abd-2nd)
(France) Basket Landes (Abd)	(Russia) Nadezhda Orenburg (Abd-3rd)
(Hungary) Sopron Basket (Abd-1st)	(Spain) Perfumerías Avenida (Abd)
(Italy) Famila Schio (Abd)	(Turkey) Fenerbahçe (Abd)
(Latvia) TTT Riga (Abd-1st)	(Turkey) Galatasaray (Abd)
Qualifying round
(Hungary) Aluinvent DVTK Miskolc (Abd-2st)	(Spain) Spar Girona (Abd)
(Romania) ACS Sepsi SIC (Abd)	(Turkey) İzmit Belediyespor (Abd)

== Referees ==
Referees of the 2020–21 season^{1}
(Austria) Christoph Rohacky; (Azerbaijan) Alakbar Hasanov; (Belarus) Lizaveta Famina; (Belgium) Tom Dehondt; (Belgium) Martin Van Hoye; (Bosnia and Herzegovina) Haris Bijedić; (Bosnia and Herzegovina) Mila Čavara; (Bosnia and Herzegovina) Ivan Miličević; (Cameroon) Arnaud Kom Njilo; (Croatia) Franko Gracin; (Croatia) Alfred Jovović; (Croatia) Nikola Perlić; (Croatia) Jelena Tomić; (Cyprus) Maria Ignatiou; (Czech Republic) Jan Baloun; (Czech Republic) Veronika Vávrová; (Denmark) Andrada Monika Csender; (Denmark) Rune Ressel Larsen; (Estonia) Mart Uuehendrik; (France) Amel Dahra; (France) Alexandre Maret	(Gibraltar) James Kerry Dominique; (Greece) Anastasios Kardaris; (Greece) Stylianos Simeonidis; (Greece) Nikolaos Somos; (Greece) Nikolaos Tziopanos; (Hungary) Tamás Földházi; (Hungary) Cecília Tóth; (Italy) Silvia Marziali; (Italy) Alessandro Perciavalle; (Lithuania) Juozas Barkauskas; (Luxembourg) Marc Mouton; (Malta) Bernard Vassallo; (Moldova) Dumitru Stasiev; (Montenegro) Nataša Dragojević; (Montenegro) Ognjen Jokić; (North Macedonia) Alija Ferevski; (North Macedonia) Aleksandar Milojević; (North Macedonia) Zoran Mitrovski; (Norway) Nikola Bejat; (Norway) Gizella Viola Györgyi; (Poland) Paulina Gajdosz	(Poland) Łukasz Jankowski; (Portugal) José Pedroso; (Portugal) Sonia Teixeira; (Romania) Alin Faur; (Romania) Bogdan Podar; (Romania) Alexandra Stan; (Russia) Elena Chernova; (Russia) Sergey Mikhaylov; (Russia) Semen Ovinov; (Serbia) Ivana Ivanović; (Serbia) Jasmina Juras; (Serbia) Nemanja Ninković; (Serbia) Jelena Smiljanić; (Slovakia) Pavel Fuska; (Slovakia) Peter Ženiš; (Slovenia) Marko Vučkovič; (Spain) Esperanza Mendoza Holgado; (Spain) Alberto Sánchez Sixto; (Turkey) Ali Şakacı; (Turkey) Özge Şentürk; (Ukraine) Vladyslav Isachenko	Notes: 1. Every BCL official is eligible to referee the EuroLeague Women.

== Round and draw dates ==
=== Schedule ===
Phase	Round	Round date
Qualifying round		28 October 2020
Regular season	Matchday 1	1 December 2020
Regular season	Matchday 2	2–3 December 2020
Regular season	Matchday 3	4 December 2020
Regular season	Matchday 4	19 January 2021
Regular season	Matchday 5	21 January 2021
Regular season	Matchday 6	22 January 2021
Quarterfinals	First leg	17 March 2021
Quarterfinals	Second leg	19 March 2021
Final Four	Semifinals	16 April 2021
Final Four	Final	18 April 2021

=== Draw ===
The draw was held on 17 August 2020 in Munich, Germany. The 16 teams were drawn into two groups of eight. For the draw, the teams were seeded into eight seeds.

The format of the competition was changed on 17 September 2020.

Seed 1	Seed 2	Seed 3	Seed 4
(Russia) UMMC Ekaterinburg (Russia) Dynamo Kursk	(Hungary) Sopron Basket (Czech Republic) ZVVZ USK Praha	(Turkey) Fenerbahçe (France) Tango Bourges Basket	(Italy) Famila Schio (Russia) Nadezhda Orenburg

Seed 5	Seed 6	Seed 7	Seed 8
(Spain) Perfumerías Avenida (Latvia) TTT Riga	(Turkey) Galatasaray (France) LDLC ASVEL Féminin	(France) Basket Landes (Poland) VBW Arka Gdynia	Qualifier 1 Qualifier 2

== Qualifying round ==
Team 1	Score	Team 2
Aluinvent DVTK Miskolc (Hungary)	68–85	(Turkey) İzmit Belediyespor
Spar Girona (Spain)	76–54	(Romania) ACS Sepsi SIC

== Regular season ==
Location of teams of the 2020–21 Euroleague Women regular season.
Red: Group A; Green: Group B; Blue: Group C; Yellow: Group D.

The two top teams of each group will qualify to the quarterfinals.

If teams are level on record at the end of the Regular Season, tiebreakers are applied in the following order:

1. Head-to-head record
2. Head-to-head point differential
3. Head-to-head points scored
4. Point differential for the entire regular season
5. Points scored for the entire regular season

=== Group A ===
Pos	Team	Pld	W	L	PF	PA	PD	Pts	Qualification	AVE	KUR	NAD	IZM
1	(Spain) Perfumerías Avenida	6	6	0	530	376	+154	12	Quarterfinals		79–70	93–38	98–72
2	(Russia) Dynamo Kursk	6	3	3	453	414	+39	9	Quarterfinals	74–89		74–77	84–46
3	(Russia) Nadezhda Orenburg	6	3	3	379	441	−62	9		42–70	62–86		80–40
4	(Turkey) İzmit Belediyespor	6	0	6	377	508	−131	6		80–101	61–65	78–80	

Source: FIBA
Legend: Blue = home team win; Red = away team win.

=== Group B ===
Pos	Team	Pld	W	L	PF	PA	PD	Pts	Qualification	FEN	ASV	USK	GDY
1	(Turkey) Fenerbahçe	6	5	1	481	416	+65	11	Quarterfinals		70–84	77–70	88–57
2	(France) LDLC ASVEL Féminin	6	4	2	481	424	+57	10	Quarterfinals	65–67		85–74	89–57
3	(Czech Republic) ZVVZ USK Praha	6	3	3	459	483	−24	9		70–99	80–79		80–67
4	(Poland) VBW Arka Gdynia	6	0	6	403	501	−98	6		70–80	76–79	76–85	

Source: FIBA
Legend: Blue = home team win; Red = away team win.

=== Group C ===
Pos	Team	Pld	W	L	PF	PA	PD	Pts	Qualification	EKA	GIR	FAM	TTT
1	(Russia) UMMC Ekaterinburg	6	6	0	445	298	+147	12	Quarterfinals		90–83	83–61	104–71
2	(Spain) Spar Girona	6	3	3	389	383	+6	9	Quarterfinals	67–94		85–81	82–52
3	(Italy) Beretta Famila Schio	6	3	3	431	456	−25	9		58–74	77–74		76–72
4	(Latvia) TTT Riga	6	0	6	383	511	−128	6		41–90	79–81	68–78	

Source: FIBA
Legend: Blue = home team win; Red = away team win.

=== Group D ===
Pos	Team	Pld	W	L	PF	PA	PD	Pts	Qualification	SOP	GAL	BOU	LAN
1	(Hungary) Sopron Basket	6	6	0	437	364	+73	12	Quarterfinals		69–66	74–67	84–54
2	(Turkey) Galatasaray	6	3	3	446	413	+33	9	Quarterfinals	58–70		75–65	89–63
3	(France) Tango Bourges Basket	6	2	4	437	430	+7	8		60–70	87–80		92–62
4	(France) Basket Landes	6	1	5	366	479	−113	7		59–70	59–78	69–66	

Source: FIBA
Legend: Blue = home team win; Red = away team win.

== Quarterfinals ==
Team 1	Agg.	Team 2	1st leg	2nd leg
Spar Girona (Spain)	131–145	(Spain) Perfumerías Avenida	66–74	65–71
Galatasaray (Turkey)	145–152	(Turkey) Fenerbahçe	74–91	71–61
Dynamo Kursk (Russia)	126–174	(Russia) UMMC Ekaterinburg	67–80	59–94
LDLC ASVEL Féminin (France)	141–156	(Hungary) Sopron Basket	66–94	75–62

=== First leg ===
17 March 2021	Dynamo Kursk (Russia)	67–80	(Russia) UMMC Ekaterinburg	Sopron
15:00 (UTC+1)	Scoring by quarter: 15–35, 21–17, 16–18, 15–10
	Pts: Frolkina 18; Rebs: Musina 8 Asts: Ogunbowale 5	Boxscore	Pts: Griner 28; Rebs: Stewart 12; Asts: Meesseman 6	Arena: Aréna Sopron; Referees: Özlem Yalman (TUR), Josip Jurčević (CRO), Veronika Vávrová (CZE)

17 March 2021	Galatasaray (Turkey)	74–91	(Turkey) Fenerbahçe	Salamanca
17:00 (UTC+1)	Scoring by quarter: 15–19, 26–25, 12–20, 21–27
	Pts: Prince 20; Rebs: Šteinberga 12; Asts: three players 3	Boxscore	Pts: Iagupova 32; Rebs: Stokes 8 Asts: Iagupova 7	Arena: Pabellón Municipal Würzburg; Referees: Gizella Viola Gyorgyi (NOR), Thomas Bissuel (FRA), José Pedroso (POR)

17 March 2021	LDLC ASVEL Féminin (France)	66–94	(Hungary) Sopron Basket	Sopron
18:00 (UTC+1)	Scoring by quarter: 20–20, 12–25, 14–23, 20–26
	Pts: Crvendakić, Plouffe 14; Rebs: Ciak 6 Asts: Crvendakić 3	Boxscore	Pts: Williams 24; Rebs: Krajišnik 7 Asts: Fegyverneky, January 6	Arena: Aréna Sopron; Referees: Marko Vučkovič (SLO), Vladimir Jevtović (SRB), Jan Baloun (CZE)

17 March 2021	Spar Girona (Spain)	66–74	(Spain) Perfumerías Avenida	Salamanca
20:00 (UTC+1)	Scoring by quarter: 12–20, 15–19, 14–16, 25–19
	Pts: Reisingerová 16; Rebs: Reisingerová 6 Asts: Palau 3	Boxscore	Pts: Milić 13; Rebs: Hof 10; Asts: three players 3	Arena: Pabellón Municipal Würzburg; Referees: Sonia Teixeira (POR), Valerio Grigioni (ITA), Rune Ressel Larsen (DEN)

=== Second leg ===
19 March 2021	Fenerbahçe (Turkey)	61–71 (152–145 agg.)	(Turkey) Galatasaray	Salamanca
16:00 (UTC+1)	Scoring by quarter: 27–21, 16–20, 14–9, 4–21
	Pts: Iagupova 18; Rebs: Stokes 13; Asts: Iagupova 4	Boxscore	Pts: Russell 24; Rebs: Russell 14; Asts: Bilgiç 5	Arena: Pabellón Municipal Würzburg; Referees: Sonia Teixeira (POR), Valerio Grigioni (ITA), Amel Dahra (FRA)

19 March 2021	UMMC Ekaterinburg (Russia)	94–59 (174–126 agg.)	(Russia) Dynamo Kursk	Sopron
17:00 (UTC+1)	Scoring by quarter: 32–9, 23–19, 21–20, 18–11
	Pts: Stewart, Vadeeva 16; Rebs: Jones 12; Asts: Torrens 4	Boxscore	Pts: Ogunbowale 14; Rebs: Lisec 5 Asts: Frolkina 3	Arena: Aréna Sopron; Referees: Marko Vučkovič (SLO), Vladimir Jevtović (SRB), Ali Şakacı (TUR)

19 March 2021	Perfumerías Avenida (Spain)	71–65 (145–131 agg.)	(Spain) Spar Girona	Salamanca
19:00 (UTC+1)	Scoring by quarter: 18–15, 14–19, 22–18, 17–13
	Pts: Hayes 16; Rebs: Hof 5 Asts: Hayes 3	Boxscore	Pts: Eldebrink 16; Rebs: Araújo 6 Asts: Gray, Palau 3	Arena: Pabellón Municipal Würzburg; Referees: Gizella Viola Györgyi (NOR), Thomas Bissuel (FRA), Nikola Perlić (CRO)

19 March 2021	Sopron Basket (Hungary)	62–75 (156–141 agg.)	(France) LDLC ASVEL Féminin	Sopron
20:05 (UTC+1)	Scoring by quarter: 14–19, 21–30, 15–14, 12–12
	Pts: Walker 14; Rebs: Brooks 12; Asts: Williams 4	Boxscore	Pts: Johannès 16; Rebs: Plouffe 8 Asts: Crvendakić, Johannès 4	Arena: Aréna Sopron; Referees: Özlem Yalman (TUR), Josip Jurčević (CRO), Blaž Zupančič (SLO)

== Final Four ==
=== Bracket ===
Semifinals
16 April
(Spain) Perfumerías Avenida	72
(Hungary) Sopron Basket	61
16 April
(Turkey) Fenerbahçe	84
(Russia) UMMC Ekaterinburg	88

Final
18 April
(Spain) Perfumerías Avenida	68
(Russia) UMMC Ekaterinburg	78
Third place
18 April
(Hungary) Sopron Basket	58
(Turkey) Fenerbahçe	64

=== Semifinals ===
16 April 2021	Fenerbahçe (Turkey)	84–88	(Russia) UMMC Ekaterinburg	Istanbul
16:00 (UTC+3)	Scoring by quarter: 21–22, 27–33, 13–13, 23–20
	Pts: Iagupova 26; Rebs: Stokes 7 Asts: Iagupova 8	Boxscore	Pts: Quigley 27; Rebs: Griner, Stewart 8 Asts: Vandersloot 6	Arena: Volkswagen Arena; Referees: Carsten Straube (GER), Beniamino Manuel Attard (ITA), Gatis Saliņš (LAT)

16 April 2021	Perfumerías Avenida (Spain)	72–61	(Hungary) Sopron Basket	Istanbul
21:00 (UTC+3)	Scoring by quarter: 16–10, 14–22, 20–10, 22–19
	Pts: Hayes 25; Rebs: Kar. Samuelson 6 Asts: Domínguez 7	Boxscore	Pts: January 15; Rebs: Krajišnik 11; Asts: January 4	Arena: Volkswagen Arena; Referees: Jasmina Juras (SRB), Ventsislav Velikov (BUL), Martin Vulić (CRO)

=== Third place game ===
18 April 2021	Sopron Basket (Hungary)	58–64	(Turkey) Fenerbahçe	Istanbul
15:00 (UTC+3)	Scoring by quarter: 9–22, 22–14, 15–11, 12–17
	Pts: Brooks 21; Rebs: Krajišnik 17; Asts: Fegyverneky 7	Boxscore	Pts: McBride 15; Rebs: McBride 10; Asts: Çakır, Iagupova 4	Arena: Volkswagen Arena; Referees: Andrada Csender (ROU), Ventsislav Velikov (BUL), Amel Dahra (FRA)

=== Final ===
18 April 2021	Perfumerías Avenida (Spain)	68–78	(Russia) UMMC Ekaterinburg	Istanbul
19:00 (UTC+3)	Scoring by quarter: 21–16, 9–23, 23–20, 15–19
	Pts: Hayes 29; Rebs: Kat. Samuelson 6 Asts: Rodríguez 5	Boxscore	Pts: Meesseman 19; Rebs: Jones 11; Asts: Vandersloot 12	Arena: Volkswagen Arena; Referees: Özlem Yalman (TUR), Jasmina Juras (SRB), Martin Vulić (CRO)

== Awards ==
=== EuroLeague MVP ===
- (Ukraine) Alina Iagupova ( (Turkey) Fenerbahçe)

=== EuroLeague Final Four MVP ===
- (United States) Breanna Stewart ( (Russia) (UMMC Ekaterinburg)

=== All-EuroLeague Teams ===
First Team		Second Team	
(Hungary) Courtney Vandersloot	(Russia) UMMC Ekaterinburg	(France) Marine Johannès	(France) LDLC ASVEL Féminin
(Ukraine) Alina Iagupova	(Turkey) Fenerbahçe	(Spain) Alba Torrens	(Russia) UMMC Ekaterinburg
(France) Gabby Williams	(Hungary) Sopron Basket	(United States) Breanna Stewart	(Russia) UMMC Ekaterinburg
(United States) Katie Lou Samuelson	(Spain) Perfumerías Avenida	(Serbia) Jelena Brooks	(Hungary) Sopron Basket
(Belgium) Emma Meesseman	(Russia) UMMC Ekaterinburg	(Germany) Satou Sabally	(Turkey) Fenerbahçe

=== Defensive Player of the Year ===
- (France) Gabby Williams ( (Hungary) Sopron Basket)

=== Young Player of the Year ===
- (France) Iliana Rupert ( (France) Tango Bourges Basket)

=== Coach of the Year ===
- (Spain) Roberto Íñiguez ( (Spain) Perfumerías Avenida)

=== Gameday MVP ===
Regular season

Gameday	Player	Team	EFF	Ref.
1	(Germany) Satou Sabally	(Turkey) Fenerbahçe	33	
2	(France) Marine Johannès	(France) LDLC ASVEL Féminin	33	
3	(France) Sandrine Gruda	(Italy) Beretta Famila Schio	37	
4	(Spain) María Araújo	(Spain) Spar Girona	30	
5	(United States) Katie Lou Samuelson	(Spain) Perfumerías Avenida	28	
6	(Canada) Natalie Achonwa	(Italy) Beretta Famila Schio	36	

Quarterfinals

Game	Player	Team	EFF	Ref.
1	(Ukraine) Alina Iagupova	(Turkey) Fenerbahçe	39	
2	(United States) Mercedes Russell	(Turkey) Galatasaray	40	

== See also ==
- 2020–21 EuroCup Women
