= Queralt Casas =

Spanish basketball player

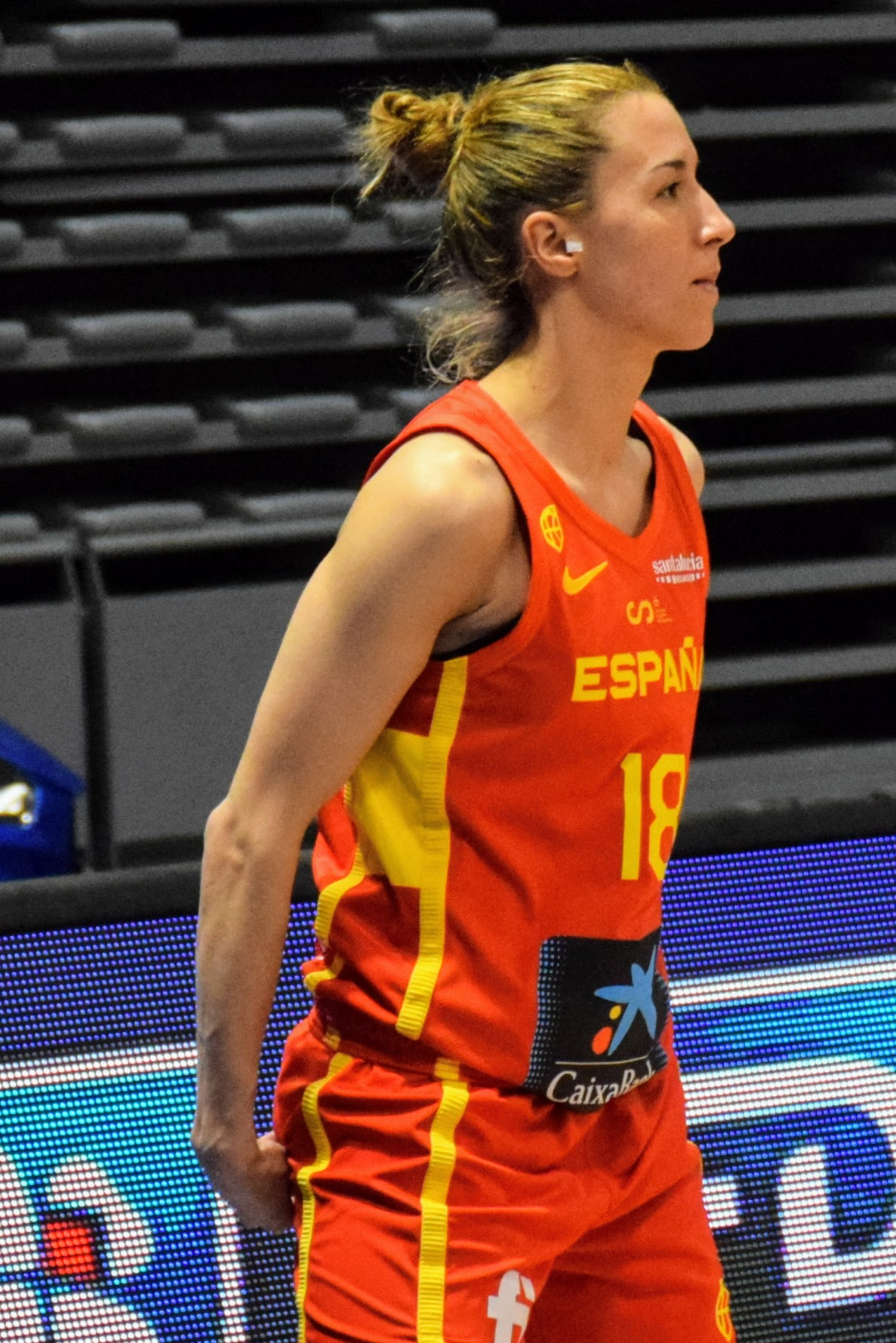

No. 10 – Valencia Basket
- Position: Shooting guard
- League: LF

Personal information
- Born: 18 November 1992 (age 33) Bescanó, Girona, Spain
- Listed height: 5 ft 11 in (1.80 m)
- Listed weight: 142 lb (64 kg)

Career information
- Playing career: 2012–present

Career history
- 2006–2010: Segle XXI (youth/LF2)
- 2010–2012: CDB Zaragoza
- 2012–2014: Rivas Ecópolis
- 2014–2015: Galatasaray SK
- 2015–2016: Nantes Rezé Basket
- 2016–2018: Basket Landes
- 2018: Flammes Carolo
- 2018-2019: Sopron Basket
- 2019-present: Valencia Basket

Career highlights
- Spanish League champion (2014); Spanish Cup champion (2013); Turkish League champion (2015); EuroCup champion (2021)

Queralt Casas Carreras (Note: In this Spanish name, the first or paternal surname is Casas and the second or maternal family name is Carreras.) (born 18 November 1992) is a Spanish basketball player. She plays as a forward in the Spanish League for Valencia Basket. Also a member of the Spanish national team, she won the gold medal at the EuroBasket Women in 2013 and 2019 with the senior team.

== Club career ==
Casas started playing with the youth teams of Segle XXI in 2006, reaching the senior team and playing in the Spanish League second tier for the last two seasons. From 2010 to 2012 she played for defunct club CDB Zaragoza in the Spanish League top tier. In April 2012 she signed a training camp contract with WNBA's Minnesota Lynx. She signed for one of the top teams of the moment, Rivas Ecópolis, winning the 2013 Cup and the 2014 League.

In 2014 she transferred to Turkish team Galatasaray Odeabank, winning the Turkish League in 2015. She then moved to France, where she played one season for Nantes Rezé Basket, two seasons for Basket Landes and a few months for Flammes Carolo Basket. In December 2018 she signed for Sopron Basket of the Hungarian League.

She returned to Spain after 5 years to play for Valencia Basket in the 2018-19 league.

=== European cups statistics ===
EuroCup winner

Season	Team	GP	MPP	PPP	RPP	APP
2010–11 EuroCup	(Spain) CDB Zaragoza	10	12.2	4.5	1.4	0.8
2012–13 EuroLeague	(Spain) Rivas Ecopolis	15	21.0	7.5	2.0	1.3
2013–14 EuroLeague	(Spain) Rivas Ecopolis	11	30.2	11.5	3.1	1.6
2014–15 EuroLeague	(Turkey) Galatasaray S.K	14	30.9	5.4	3.1	2.1
2015–16 EuroCup	(France) Nantes Rezé Basket	10	33.8	17.0	6.5	3.9
2016–17 EuroCup	(France) Basket Landes	2	31.0	16.5	4.0	3.0
2017–18 EuroCup	(France) Basket Landes	8	28.0	12.8	4.9	3.3
2018–19 EuroLeague	(France) Flammes Carolo	4	27.1	11.8	4.3	4.0
2018–19 EuroLeague	(Hungary) Sopron Basket	13	31.7	8.4	5.2	3.7
2020-21 EuroCup	(Spain) Valencia Basket	7	26.4	10.6	3.9	3.6

== National team ==
Casas started playing with Spain's youth teams at 15, winning a total of six medals from 2008 to 2012. She made her debut with the senior team in 2013, when she was 20 years old. She won the gold medal at the EuroBasket Women 2013. After participating in a few friendlies in 2014 and 2015, she played again official games in February 2018, when coach Lucas Mondelo called her up for the 2019 EuroBasket qualifiers. Up to 2021, she had 78 caps with 3.5 PPG.

- 2008 FIBA Europe Under-16 Championship (youth) (All-Tournament Team)
- 2009 FIBA Europe Under-18 Championship (youth)
- 2010 FIBA Europe Under-18 Championship (youth) (All-Tournament Team)
- 2011 FIBA Europe Under-20 Championship (youth) (MVP)
- 2011 FIBA Under-19 World Championship (youth)
- 2012 FIBA Europe Under-20 Championship (youth) (All-Tournament Team)
- 2013 Eurobasket
- 2018 World Championship
- 2019 Eurobasket
- 7th 2021 Eurobasket
- 6th 2020 Summer Olympics
- 2023 Eurobasket
