= Porta XI Ensino =

Spanish basketball team

Durán Maquinaria Ensino
- Leagues: Liga Femenina
- Founded: 1980
- History: CD Ensino (1980–2005); Porta XI CBF (2005–2019) Ensino Lugo Club de Baloncesto (2019-present)
- Arena: Pazo dos Deportes
- Location: Lugo, Spain
- Team colors: Red
- President: Manuel Durán
- Head coach: Carlos Cantero
- Championships: 1 Liga Femenina 2
- Website: ensinolugo.com
Home	Away

Ensino Lugo Club de Baloncesto, also known for sponsorship reasons as Durán Maquinaria Ensino is a Spanish women's basketball team, currently competing in the Spanish First Division.

== History ==
Founded in 1980 as CD Ensino, the club debuted in the third tier of the Spanish league system, called 2ª División Nacional, with most players coming from the Compañía de María school in Lugo. In its seventh season, the club finished 3rd and promoted to the second tier league, called the 1ª División B. The club played in this division for seven of the next eight seasons, with a relegation to the third tier and an immediate promotion, until 1995, when they were promoted for the first time to the first tier league, called Primera División, with Manel Sánchez as coach.

The club played for 12 consecutive seasons in the Spanish top tier league, since its promotion in 1995 to its relegation in 2007, finishing third in three seasons (1999, 2000, 2004). Its best regular season was in 1998-99, when they finished first. In addition it reached the final of the national Cup twice (1999, 2002), with Juan Corral as coach.

After eleven seasons and five failed promotion playoffs, Ensino came back to Liga Femenina in 2018. It achieved a streak of 19 consecutive wins, including the four games of the promotion playoffs, in the third season of Juan Nécega as head coach.

Following its return to Liga Femenina in 2018, Ensino established itself as a regular member of Spain's top division despite operating with one of the league's more modest budgets. The club progressively strengthened its sporting structure and became recognized for its competitive performances against some of the country's leading teams, while also reinforcing its commitment to developing women's basketball in Galicia.

During the first half of the 2020s, Ensino continued its sporting growth, qualifying for the Copa de la Reina for the first time in the club's history and becoming a consistent contender for the Liga Femenina playoffs. The club's stability on and off the court, together with increasing attendance at the Pazo dos Deportes, consolidated Ensino as one of the reference women's basketball projects in north-western Spain.

The 2025–26 season was one of the most successful in the club's history. Ensino qualified for the Copa de la Reina after finishing the first half of the Liga Femenina season among the top eight teams and later reached the Liga Femenina playoffs after recording one of its best regular-season campaigns since returning to the top flight in 2018. The team's performances established Ensino as a consistent contender in Spain's premier women's basketball competition.

== Sponsorship naming ==
- CD Ensino (1980-1993)
- Fonxesta Ensino (1994–1997)
- Ensino Universidade (1998–1999)
- Ensino Yaya María (1999–2001)
- Yaya María Breogán (2001–2005)
- Yaya María Porta XI (2005–2006)
- Durán Maquinaria Ensino (2007–present)

== Current roster ==
Roster for the 2021-22 Liga Femenina.

Note: Flags indicate national team eligibility at FIBA-sanctioned events. Players may hold other non-FIBA nationalities not displayed.

Durán Maquinaria Ensino Lugo - 2021-22 roster
Players
Coaches

Pos.	No.	Nat.	Name	Ht.	Age
SG	4	(Spain)	Prieto, Alba	1.80 m (5 ft 11 in)	27 – 15 June 1999
F	5	(Spain)	Eraunzetamurgil, Maria	1.85 m (6 ft 1 in)	27 – 28 July 1998
PF	6	(Spain)	Abalde, Tamara	1.92 m (6 ft 4 in)	37 – 6 February 1989
PG	7	(Italy)	Orsili, Alessandra	1.67 m (5 ft 6 in)	24 – 4 October 2001
PG	9	(Spain)	Lizarazu, Marina	1.72 m (5 ft 8 in)	31 – 10 January 1995
SF	10	(Netherlands)	van den Adel, Natalie	1.85 m (6 ft 1 in)	35 – 25 October 1990
SF	12	(Spain)	Aliaga Romero, Laura	1.86 m (6 ft 1 in)	31 – 4 November 1994
PF	14	(Spain)	Bahí, Georgina	1.89 m (6 ft 2 in)	37 – 1 June 1989
SF	16	(Spain)	Oma, Helena	1.80 m (5 ft 11 in)	29 – 23 October 1996
C	18	(Portugal)	da Silva, Sofía	1.90 m (6 ft 3 in)	35 – 30 July 1990
C	32	(United States)	White, Chatrice	1.91 m (6 ft 3 in)	30 – 20 June 1996
SF	77	(Paraguay)	Ferrari, Paola	1.78 m (5 ft 10 in)	40 – 16 September 1985
PG	97	(Spain)	Hoyuelos, Paula	1.66 m (5 ft 5 in)	22 – 19 June 2004
C	99	(Spain)	Lijó, Elena	1.94 m (6 ft 4 in)	23 – 13 February 2003

Head coach

- (Spain) Miguel Ángel Ortega

Assistant coach(es)

- (Spain) Fernán Varela

Athletic trainer(s)

- (Spain) Jairo Díaz

Physiotherapist(s)

- (Spain) Judith Ferreiros

Legend

- (C) Team captain
- Injured

- Roster
Updated: November 25, 2021

== Season by season ==
Season	Tier	Division	Pos.	Copa de la Reina	
1980–81	3	2ª División			
1981–82	3	2ª División			
1982–83	3	2ª División			
1983–84	3	2ª División			
1984–85	3	2ª División			
1985–86	3	2ª División			
1986–87	3	2ª División	2nd		
1987–88	2	1ª División B			
1988–89	2	1ª División B			
1989–90	2	1ª División B	R		
1990–91	3	2ª División	1st		
1991–92	2	1ª División B			
1992–93	2	1ª División B			
1993–94	2	1ª División B			
1994–95	2	1ª División B	1st		
1995–96	1	1ª División	10th	Second round	
1996–97	1	Liga Femenina	7th	Quarterfinalist	
1997–98	1	Liga Femenina	5th	Quarterfinalist	
1998–99	1	Liga Femenina	3rd	Runner-up	
1999–00	1	Liga Femenina	3rd	Quarterfinalist	
2000–01	1	Liga Femenina	4th	Semifinalist	
2001–02	1	Liga Femenina	6th	Runner-up	
2002–03	1	Liga Femenina	12th		
2003–04	1	Liga Femenina	3rd		
2004–05	1	Liga Femenina	12th		
2005–06	1	Liga Femenina	10th	Quarterfinalist	
2006–07	1	Liga Femenina	13th		
2007–08	2	Liga Femenina 2	8th		
2008–09	2	Liga Femenina 2	13th		
2009–10	2	Liga Femenina 2	3rd		
2010–11	2	Liga Femenina 2	7th		
2011–12	2	Liga Femenina 2	4th		
2012–13	2	Liga Femenina 2	4th		
2013–14	2	Liga Femenina 2	3rd		
2014–15	2	Liga Femenina 2	2nd		
2015–16	2	Liga Femenina 2	7th		
2016–17	2	Liga Femenina 2	10th		
2017–18	2	Liga Femenina 2	1°		
2018–19	1	Liga Femenina	10th		
2019–20	1	Liga Femenina	7th	Quarterfinalist	
2020–21	1	Liga Femenina	7th	Quarterfinalist	
2021–22	1	Liga Femenina	10th		EuroCup Group Stage
2022–23	1	Liga Femenina	11th		
2023–24	1	Liga Femenina			

== Xuncas Baloncesto ==
Porta XI Ensino CBF is not to be confused with an older women's basketball club from Lugo, Xuncas Baloncesto, which played in the first tier league from 1986-87 to 1991-92, when it was dissolved. In its short spell in the Liga Femenina, Xuncas was league runner-up twice (1987 and 1989) and Cup runner-up three times (1987, 1988 and 1989). For sponsorship reasons, the club was known as:

- Arjeriz Xuncas (until 1988)
- Pizarras Inlusa Xuncas (1988-1989)
- Magefesa Xuncas (1989–1992)

Season	Tier	Division	Pos.	Copa de la Reina
1985–86	2	1ª División B	P	
1986–87	1	1ª División	2nd	Runner-up
1987–88	1	1ª División	5th	Runner-up
1988–89	1	1ª División	2nd	Runner-up
1989–90	1	1ª División	9th	
1990–91	1	1ª División	11th	Round of 16
1991–92	1	1ª División	14th	
