= 2020–21 EuroCup Women =

EuroCup Women
- Season: 2020–21
- Dates: Qualifying: 16–17 December 2020; Competition proper: 19 January – 11 April 2021
- Teams: Competition proper: 31; Total: 34

Finals
- Champions: (Spain) Valencia Basket
- Runners-up: (Italy) Reyer Venezia
- Final Four MVP: (Spain) Queralt Casas (Valencia Basket)

The 2020–21 EuroCup Women was the nineteenth edition of FIBA Europe's second-tier international competition for women's basketball clubs under such name.

== Teams ==
Teams were confirmed by FIBA Europe on 10 August 2020.

Regular season
Conference 1		Conference 2	
(Hungary) Aluinvent DVTK Miskolc (EL Q)	(Hungary) Atomerőmű KSC Szekszárd	(Romania) ACS Sepsi SIC (EL Q)	(Italy) Reyer Venezia
(Russia) Sparta&K M.R. Vidnoje (4th)	(Hungary) UNI Győr Mély-Út	(France) Landerneau Bretagne Basket (5th)	(Belgium) Castors Braine
(Russia) PBC MBA Moscow (6th)	(Hungary) VBW CEKK Cegléd	(France) Flammes Carolo Basket (4th)	(Belgium) Basket Hema SKW
(Turkey) Orman Gençlik (4th)	(Poland) AZS AJP Gorzów Wielkopolski	(France) Roche Vendée Basket (7th)	(Belgium) Phantoms Basket Boom
(Turkey) Kayseri Basketbol (8th)	(Czech Republic) KP Brno	(France) ESBVA-LM (8th)	(Switzerland) BCF Elfic Fribourg
(Turkey) Elazığ İl Özel İdarespor (10th)	(Sweden) A3 Basket Umeå	(Spain) Lointek Gernika Bizkaia (3rd)	
(Turkey) Adana Basketbol (9th)	(Israel) Neve David Ramla	(Spain) Valencia Basket (4th)	
(Turkey) Hatay BB (11th)	(Ukraine) BC Prometey	(Spain) Cadi La Seu (6th)	
Qualification round
Conference 1		Conference 2	
		(France) Saint-Amand Hainaut Basket	(Belgium) Kangoeroes Mechelen
		(Spain) CDB Clarinos De La Laguna (8th)	(Switzerland) BC Winterthur
		(Belgium) Basket Namur Capitale	(Luxembourg) BBC Grengewald Hueschtert

== Schedule ==
Phase	Round	Round date
Qualifying round		16–17 December 2020
Regular season	Matchday 1	19 January 2021
Regular season	Matchday 2	20–21 January 2021
Regular season	Matchday 3	22 January 2021
Play-offs	Round of 16	16–17 March 2021
Play-offs	Quarterfinals	18–19 March 2021
Play-offs	Semifinals	9 April 2021
Play-offs	Finals	11 April 2021

== Qualification round ==
Draw for the qualification round and the group stage was made on 17 August 2020 in Munich, Germany.

Team 1	Score	Team 2
Saint-Amand Hainaut Basket (France)	85–57	(Switzerland) BC Winterthur
Kangoeroes Mechelen (Belgium)	84–90	(Spain) CDB Clarinos De La Laguna
Basket Namur Capitale (Belgium)	88–68	(Luxembourg) BBC Grengewald Hueschtert

== Group stage ==
Draw for the qualification round and the group stage was made on 17 August 2020 in Munich, Germany.

=== Conference 1 ===
==== Group A ====
Pos	Team	Pld	W	L	PF	PA	PD	Pts	Qualification	SZE	KAY	GYO	PRO
1	(Hungary) Atomerőmű KSC Szekszárd	3	3	0	269	218	+51	6	Round of 16	—	—	75–67	106–80
2	(Turkey) Kayseri Basketbol	3	2	1	263	242	+21	5	Round of 16	71–88	—	—	106–82
3	(Hungary) UNI Győr Mély-Út (H)	3	1	2	222	217	+5	4		—	72–86	—	—
4	(Ukraine) BC Prometey	3	0	3	218	295	−77	3		—	—	56–83	—

Source: FIBA
Rules for classification: 1) Points; 2) Head-to-head record; 3) Head-to-head point differential; 4) General point differential; 5) Points scored.
(H) Hosts

==== Group B ====
Pos	Team	Pld	W	L	PF	PA	PD	Pts	Qualification	RAM	MIS	ORM	UME
1	(Israel) Neve David Ramla	2	2	0	177	124	+53	4	Round of 16	—	—	97–63	—
2	(Hungary) Aluinvent DVTK Miskolc	2	1	1	154	162	−8	3	Round of 16	61–80	—	—	—
3	(Turkey) Orman Gençlik (H)	2	0	2	145	190	−45	2		—	82–93	—	—
4	(Sweden) A3 Basket Umeå	0	0	0	0	0	0	0	Withdrawn	—	—	—	—

Source: FIBA
Rules for classification: 1) Points; 2) Head-to-head record; 3) Head-to-head point differential; 4) General point differential; 5) Points scored.
(H) Hosts

==== Group C ====
Pos	Team	Pld	W	L	PF	PA	PD	Pts	Qualification	SPA	CEG	HAT	ADA
1	(Russia) Sparta&K M.R. Vidnoje	3	2	1	220	185	+35	5	Round of 16	—	78–61	—	—
2	(Hungary) VBW CEKK Cegléd	3	2	1	218	196	+22	5	Round of 16	—	—	85–66	72–52
3	(Turkey) Hatay BB (H)	3	2	1	222	210	+12	5		77–72	—	—	79–53
4	(Turkey) Adana Basketbol	3	0	3	152	221	−69	3		47–70	—	—	—

Source: FIBA
Rules for classification: 1) Points; 2) Head-to-head record; 3) Head-to-head point differential; 4) General point differential; 5) Points scored.
(H) Hosts

==== Group D ====
Pos	Team	Pld	W	L	PF	PA	PD	Pts	Qualification	ELA	GOR	BRN	MBA
1	(Turkey) Elazığ İl Özel İdarespor	3	3	0	246	211	+35	6	Round of 16	—	88–76	—	—
2	(Poland) AZS AJP Gorzów Wielkopolski	3	1	2	243	236	+7	4	Round of 16	—	—	70–72	—
3	(Czech Republic) KP Brno (H)	3	1	2	205	221	−16	4		61–73	—	—	72–78
4	(Russia) PBC MBA Moscow	3	1	2	228	254	−26	4		74–85	76–97	—	—

Source: FIBA
Rules for classification: 1) Points; 2) Head-to-head record; 3) Head-to-head point differential; 4) General point differential; 5) Points scored.
(H) Hosts

=== Conference 2 ===
==== Group E ====
Pos	Team	Pld	W	L	PF	PA	PD	Pts	Qualification	VEN	FRI	BRE	BOO
1	(Italy) Reyer Venezia	3	3	0	320	178	+142	6	Round of 16	—	116–63	86–62	—
2	(Switzerland) BCF Elfic Fribourg	3	2	1	231	243	−12	5	Round of 16	—	—	69–68	99–59
3	(France) Landerneau Bretagne Basket (H)	3	1	2	224	199	+25	4		—	—	—	94–44
4	(Belgium) Phantoms Basket Boom	3	0	3	156	311	−155	3		53–118	—	—	—

Source: FIBA
Rules for classification: 1) Points; 2) Head-to-head record; 3) Head-to-head point differential; 4) General point differential; 5) Points scored.
(H) Hosts

==== Group F ====
Pos	Team	Pld	W	L	PF	PA	PD	Pts	Qualification	CAR	GER	TEN	RVB
1	(France) Flammes Carolo Basket	3	2	1	206	182	+24	5	Round of 16	—	50–57	—	79–66
2	(Spain) Lointek Gernika Bizkaia	3	2	1	199	178	+21	5	Round of 16	—	—	60–61	82–67
3	(Spain) Tenerife	3	2	1	201	203	−2	5		59–77	—	—	—
4	(France) Roche Vendée Basket	3	0	3	199	242	−43	3		—	—	66–81	—

Source: FIBA
Rules for classification: 1) Points; 2) Head-to-head record; 3) Head-to-head point differential; 4) General point differential; 5) Points scored.

==== Group G ====
Pos	Team	Pld	W	L	PF	PA	PD	Pts	Qualification	SEP	ESB	SED	NAM
1	(Romania) ACS Sepsi SIC (H)	3	2	1	212	171	+41	5	Round of 16	—	70–73	57–50	—
2	(France) ESBVA-LM	3	2	1	217	186	+31	5	Round of 16	—	—	69–71	75–45
3	(Spain) Cadí La Seu	3	2	1	172	171	+1	5		—	—	—	51–45
4	(Belgium) Basket Namur Capitale	3	0	3	138	211	−73	3		48–85	—	—	—

Source: FIBA
Rules for classification: 1) Points; 2) Head-to-head record; 3) Head-to-head point differential; 4) General point differential; 5) Points scored.
(H) Hosts

==== Group H ====
Pos	Team	Pld	W	L	PF	PA	PD	Pts	Qualification	VAL	SAI	CAS	SKW
1	(Spain) Valencia Basket (H)	3	3	0	231	139	+92	6	Round of 16	—	71–50	—	82–42
2	(France) Saint-Amand Hainaut Basket	3	2	1	208	198	+10	5	Round of 16	—	—	82–64	—
3	(Belgium) BC Castors Braine	3	1	2	188	211	−23	4		47–78	—	—	77–51
4	(Belgium) Basket Hema SKW	3	0	3	156	235	−79	3		—	63–76	—	—

Source: FIBA
Rules for classification: 1) Points; 2) Head-to-head record; 3) Head-to-head point differential; 4) General point differential; 5) Points scored.
(H) Hosts

=== Seeding ===
Results against fourth-placed teams were disregarded in all groups of four to rank the 16 qualified teams for the play-offs.

Seed	Grp	Team	Pld	W	L	PF	PA	PD	Pts
1	E	(Italy) Reyer Venezia	2	2	0	202	125	+77	4
2	B	(Israel) Neve David Ramla	2	2	0	177	124	+53	4
3	H	(Spain) Valencia Basket	2	2	0	149	97	+52	4
4	A	(Hungary) Atomerőmű KSC Szekszárd	2	2	0	163	138	+25	4
5	D	(Turkey) Elazığ İl Özel İdarespor	2	2	0	161	137	+24	4
6	C	(Russia) Sparta&K M.R. Vidnoje	2	1	1	150	138	+12	3
7	F	(France) Flammes Carolo Basket	2	1	1	127	116	+11	3
8	F	(Spain) Lointek Gernika Bizkaia	2	1	1	117	111	+6	3
9	G	(Romania) ACS Sepsi SIC	2	1	1	127	123	+4	3
10	C	(Hungary) VBW CEKK Cegléd	2	1	1	146	144	+2	3
11	G	(France) ESBVA-LM	2	1	1	142	141	+1	3
12	A	(Turkey) Kayseri Basketbol	2	1	1	157	160	−3	3
13	H	(France) Saint-Amand Hainaut Basket	2	1	1	132	135	−3	3
14	B	(Hungary) Aluinvent DVTK Miskolc	2	1	1	154	162	−8	3
15	E	(Switzerland) BCF Elfic Fribourg	2	1	1	132	184	−52	3
16	D	(Poland) AZS AJP Gorzów Wielkopolski	2	0	2	146	160	−14	2

Source: FIBA.com
Rules for classification: 1) Points; 2) Points difference; 3) Points scored.

== Playoffs ==
=== Bracket ===
Round of 16
16 March – Sfântu Gheorghe
1 (Italy) Reyer Venezia	72
16 (Poland) AZS AJP Gorzów Wielkopolski	63
16 March – Sfântu Gheorghe
8 (Spain) Lointek Gernika Bizkaia	73
9 (Romania) ACS Sepsi SIC (OT)	76
16 March – Kayseri
4 (Hungary) Atomerőmű KSC Szekszárd	66
13 (France) Saint-Amand Hainaut Basket	53
16 March – Kayseri
5 (Turkey) Elazığ İl Özel İdarespor	88
12 (Turkey) Kayseri Basketbol	86
17 March – Sfântu Gheorghe
2 (Israel) Neve David Ramla	73
15 (Switzerland) BCF Elfic Fribourg	78
17 March – Sfântu Gheorghe
7 (France) Flammes Carolo Basket	81
10 (Hungary) VBW CEKK Cegléd	46
16 March – Valencia
3 (Spain) Valencia Basket	80
14 (Hungary) Aluinvent DVTK Miskolc	57
16 March – Valencia
6 (Russia) Sparta&K M.R. Vidnoje	62
11 (France) ESBVA-LM	69

Quarterfinals
18 March – Sfântu Gheorghe
(Italy) Reyer Venezia	78
(Romania) ACS Sepsi SIC	64
18 March – Kayseri
(Hungary) Atomerőmű KSC Szekszárd	77
(Turkey) Elazığ İl Özel İdarespor	67
19 March – Sfântu Gheorghe
(Switzerland) BCF Elfic Fribourg	56
(France) Flammes Carolo Basket	85
18 March – Valencia
(Spain) Valencia Basket	81
(France) ESBVA-LM	67

Semifinals
9 April – Szekszárd
(Italy) Reyer Venezia	63
(Hungary) Atomerőmű KSC Szekszárd	58
9 April – Szekszárd
(France) Flammes Carolo Basket	68
(Spain) Valencia Basket	80

Final
11 April – Szekszárd
(Italy) Reyer Venezia	81
(Spain) Valencia Basket	82
Third place
11 April – Szekszárd
(Hungary) Atomerőmű KSC Szekszárd	68
(France) Flammes Carolo Basket	55

== See also ==
- 2020–21 EuroLeague Women
