= Katie Lou Samuelson =

American basketball player (born 1997)

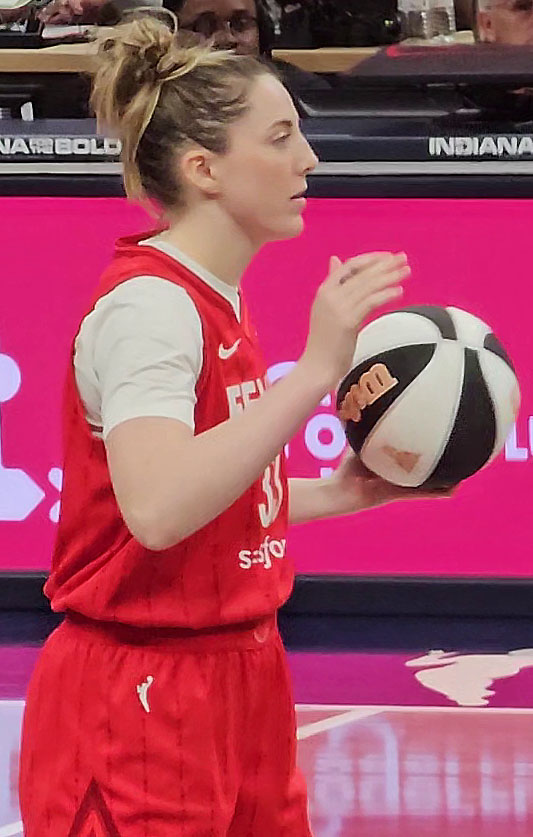
- Samuelson in 2024 playing for the Indiana Fever

No. 33 – Seattle Storm
- Position: Small forward
- League: WNBA

Personal information
- Born: June 13, 1997 (age 29) Fullerton, California, U.S.
- Listed height: 6 ft 3 in (1.91 m)
- Listed weight: 163 lb (74 kg)

Career information
- High school: Mater Dei (Santa Ana, California)
- College: UConn (2015–2019)
- WNBA draft: 2019: 1st round, 4th overall pick
- Drafted by: Chicago Sky
- Playing career: 2019–present

Career history
- 2019: Chicago Sky
- 2019: Flammes Carolo Basket
- 2020: Dallas Wings
- 2020–2022: CB Avenida
- 2021: Seattle Storm
- 2022–2023: Los Angeles Sparks
- 2024: Indiana Fever
- 2025: Phantom BC
- 2025–present: Seattle Storm

Career highlights
- Commissioner’s Cup champion (2021); Liga Femenina Endesa Finals MVP (2021); NCAA champion (2016); Second-team All-American – USBWA (2019); 2× All-American – USBWA (2017, 2018); 3× WBCA All-American (2017–2019); Third-team All-American – AP (2019); 2× First-team All-American – AP (2017, 2018); 2× AAC Player of the Year (2017, 2018); AAC tournament MOP (2017); 3× First-team All-AAC (2017–2019); AAC All-Freshman Team (2016); Naismith Prep Player of the Year (2015); Morgan Wootten Player of the Year (2015); McDonald's All-American (2015); Gatorade National Player of the Year (2015)
- Stats at WNBA.com
- Stats at Basketball Reference
Medals
Women's basketball
Representing the United States
FIBA AmeriCup
Gold medal – first place	2019 Puerto Rico	Team
FIBA Under-17 World Cup
Gold medal – first place	2014 Czech Republic	Team
FIBA Americas Under-16 Championship
Gold medal – first place	2013 Mexico	Team
Women's 3x3 basketball
Representing United States
FIBA 3x3 AmeriCup
Gold medal – first place	2023 San Juan	Team
Youth Olympic Games
Gold medal – first place	2014 China	Team
Bronze medal – third place	2014 China	Shoot-out
FIBA 3x3 Under-18 World Cup
Gold medal – first place	2013 Indonesia	Team

Katie Lou Samuelson (born June 13, 1997) is an American professional basketball player for the Seattle Storm of the Women's National Basketball Association (WNBA). She played college basketball for the UConn Huskies. Samuelson is also the director of player development for the Vanderbilt Commodores women's basketball program.

== Early life ==
Samuelson played for the Mater Dei High School basketball team for three seasons. As a sophomore in 2012–13, she averaged 20.9 points and 6.9 rebounds per game and helped Mater Dei to a 30–2 record. The following season, Samuelson averaged 29.2 points and 9.4 rebounds. She was named the 2014 California Player of the Year and was a USA Today first-team All-American. As a senior, Samuelson averaged 24.9 points and 8.5 rebounds. She helped Mater Dei win their third consecutive Trinity League championship and the 2015 state regional championship; the team finished 31–3. Following the 2014–15 season, Samuelson was named the national player of the year by Gatorade, USA Today, McDonald's, and the Women's Basketball Coaches Association, won the Naismith Trophy, and made the consensus All-American first team. During her high school career, she set Mater Dei single-season records for points average (29.2), field goal percentage (62.0), free throw percentage (89.4), free throws made (178), free throws attempted (211), and three-pointers made (117).

== College career ==
Samuelson was a freshman at the University of Connecticut in 2015–16. She played in 37 of the Huskies' 38 games, including 22 starts. She missed the national championship game due to an injury. During the season, Samuelson scored 11.0 points per game and led the team with 78 made three-pointers, which was the second-most ever by a Connecticut freshman. She scored a season-high 22 points against Robert Morris on March 19. Samuelson was named the 2016 national freshman of the year by ESPNw. She was also named to the American Athletic Conference all-freshman team and the AAC all-tournament team.

In 2016–17, Samuelson started in all 37 of the Huskies' games. Her 20.2 points per game and 42.0 three-point field goal percentage both ranked second in the AAC. Her 119 made three-pointers that season was the second-highest in school history. On March 6, 2017, Samuelson scored a career-high 40 points against USF; she also set the NCAA single-game record for most three-pointers made without a miss, with 10. She was named the 2017 AAC co-player of the year and the AAC tournament most outstanding player. She was also selected as a first team All-American by the AP, WBCA, and USBWA, and made the AAC first team.

On January 13, 2019, Samuelson surpassed the 2,000 career point mark in a win over South Florida. She became the tenth UConn player to achieve this milestone.

== National team career ==
Samuelson was part of the United States under-17 team who won the 2013 FIBA Americas U-16 Championship and subsequent 2014 FIBA U-17 World Championship. Samuelson was part of the United States women's national 3x3 team that would compete in the inaugural Olympic tournament at the 2020 Summer Olympics, but wound up off the team as she contracted COVID-19 just prior to the start of the games. Samuelson returned to the team in the 2023 FIBA 3x3 AmeriCup.

== Professional career ==
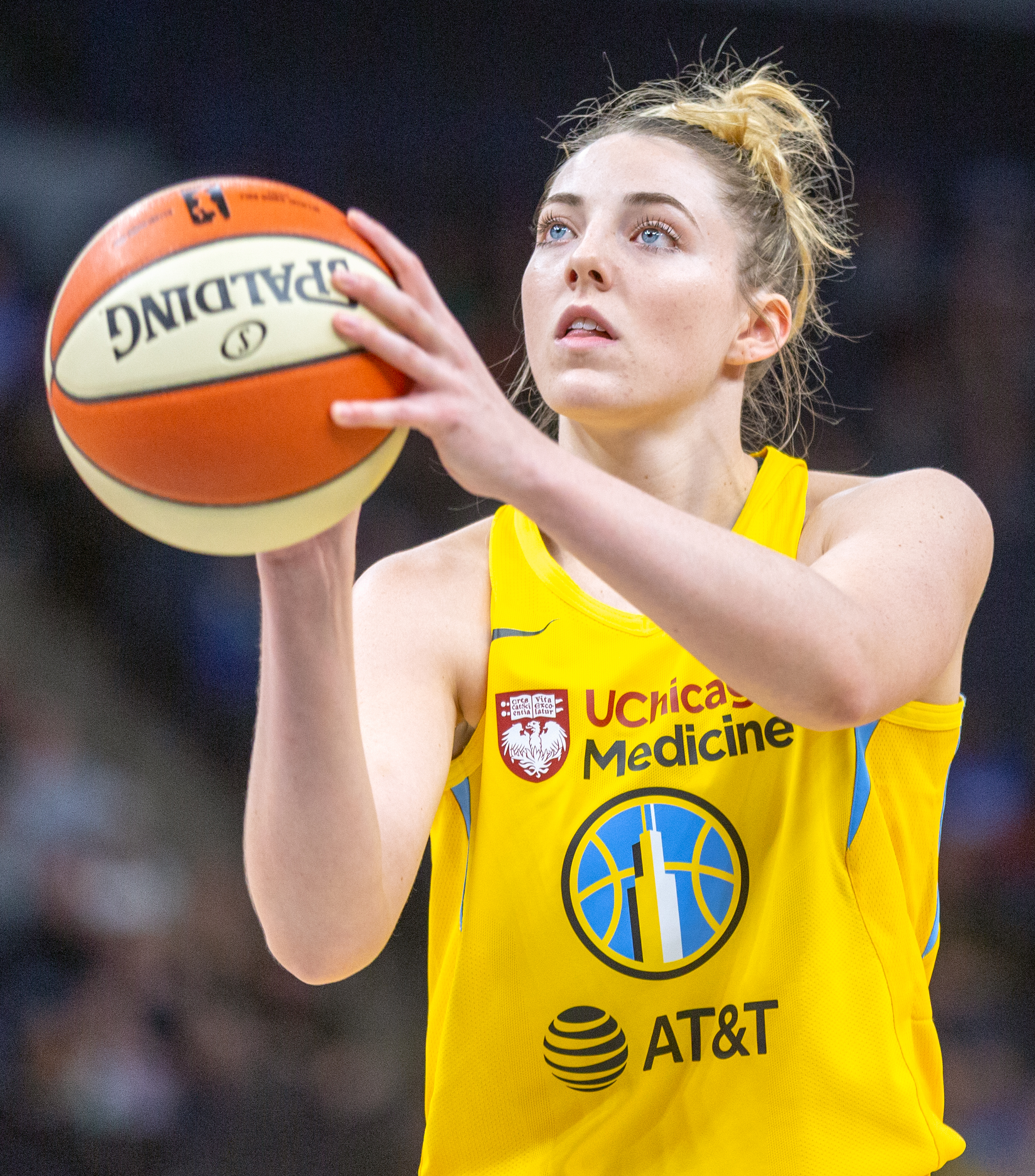
Samuelson playing for the Chicago Sky in 2019

=== Chicago Sky (2019) ===
Samuelson was drafted 4th overall by the Chicago Sky in the 2019 WNBA draft, with whom she spent her rookie season. Across 20 games, she averaged 2.4 points, 0.9 rebounds, and 0.4 assists during 7.7 minutes per game.

=== Dallas Wings and Perfumerías Avenida (2020-2021) ===
Samuelson was traded to the Dallas Wings for Azurá Stevens on February 14, 2020, making Katie Lou and her sister Karlie teammates for the first time as professionals. However, Karlie was waived before the season began. The sisters still wound up playing together in Spain as Samuelson signed with Karlie's team Perfumerías Avenida. Samuelson helped Avenida win the Spanish championship and finish second in the continental EuroLeague, being listed on the team of the tournament in both championships.

=== Seattle Storm (2021) ===
Samuelson was traded on February 10, 2021, to the Seattle Storm for the number one overall pick in the 2021 WNBA draft, who became Charli Collier. While with Seattle, Samuelson became a full-time starter for the first time in her career, having started 24 of the 27 games she played for them while averaging career highs of 7 points, 3.5 rebounds, and 1.7 assists per game. Katie Lou’s sister Karlie later joined the Storm and played three games with them in August and September 2021.

=== Los Angeles Sparks (2022) ===
Her tenure with the Storm ended on February 3, 2022, when she and the 2022 WNBA draft ninth pick were traded to the Los Angeles Sparks in exchange for Gabby Williams. Samuelson was a teammate with Williams for three years at UConn and both women were selected fourth overall by the Chicago Sky in consecutive years, Williams having been picked in 2018.

=== Indiana Fever (2024) ===
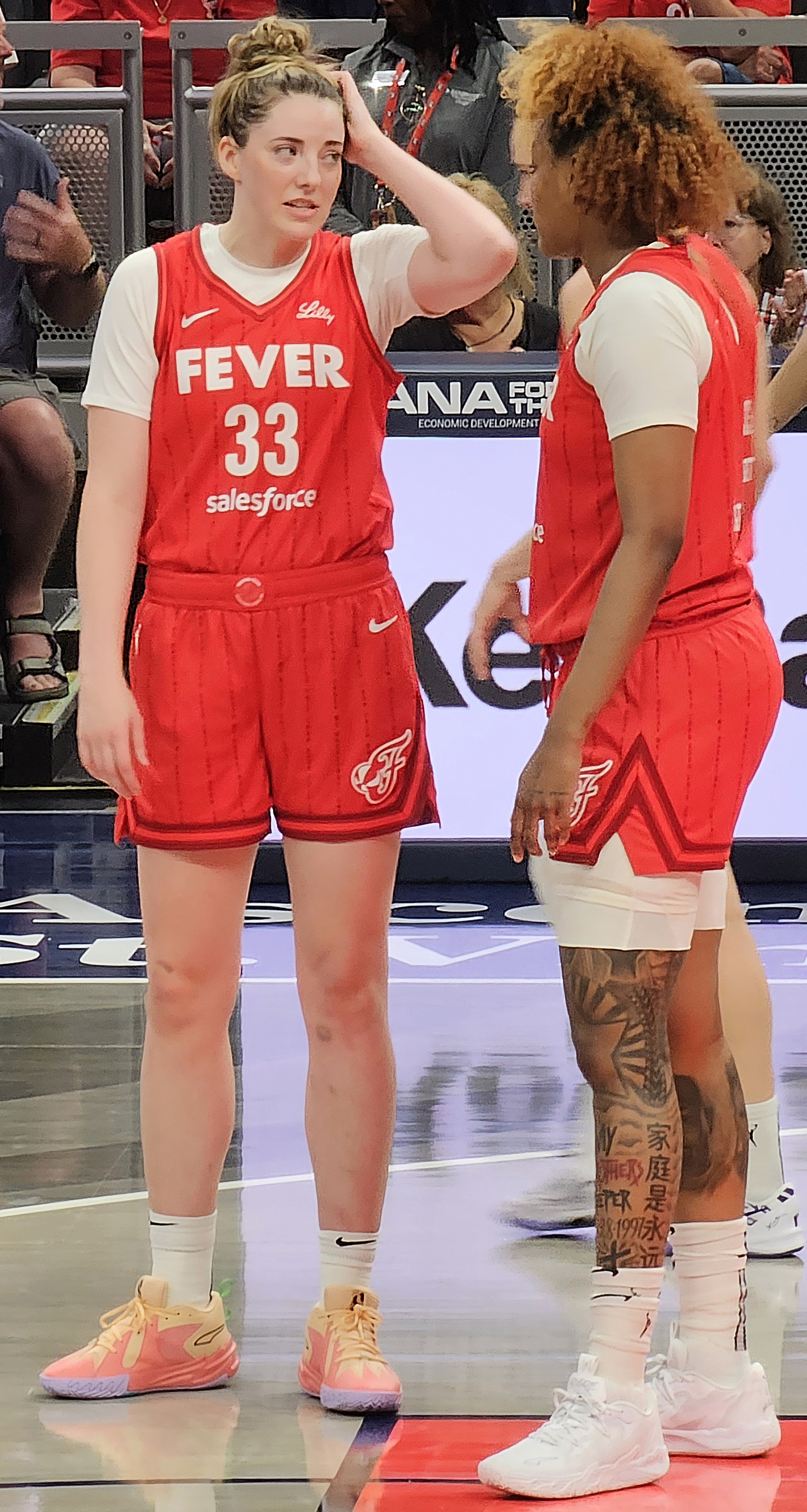
Samuelson (left) speaking with teammate, NaLyssa Smith, (right) during a game in 2024

After not playing the 2023 season due to her pregnancy, Samuelson signed with the Indiana Fever prior to the 2024 WNBA season on February 1, 2024.

On February 10, 2025, Samuelson was waived by the Fever and signed a mutual contract termination agreement with the team.

=== Phantom BC and second stint with Seattle Storm (2025–present) ===
On December 20, 2024, it was announced that Samuelson had signed with Phantom BC (filling their wildcard spot) for the inaugural 2025 season of Unrivaled, the women’s 3-on-3 basketball league founded by Napheesa Collier and Breanna Stewart.

On February 21, 2025, Samuelson signed with the Seattle Storm for a one-year deal, returning to the franchise after four years. On May 3, the Storm announced that Samuelson sustained a right ACL tear during practice on May 1.

On April 13, 2026, it was announced that Samuelson had been re-signed by the Storm. Samuelson made 32 appearances (including one start) for Seattle during the 2026 WNBA season, recording averages of 4.4 points and 2.1 rebounds. On September 11, Samuelson was ruled out for the remainder of the season after undergoing arthroscopic surgery on her left knee.

== Career statistics ==
Legend
GP	Games played	GS	Games started	MPG	Minutes per game	FG%	Field goal percentage
3P%	3-point field goal percentage	FT%	Free throw percentage	RPG	Rebounds per game	APG	Assists per game
SPG	Steals per game	BPG	Blocks per game	TO	Turnovers per game	PPG	Points per game
**Bold**	Career high	*	Led Division I

*	Denotes season(s) in which Samuelson won an NCAA Championship

=== WNBA ===
==== Regular season ====
Stats current through end of 2026 regular season

WNBA regular season statistics
Year	Team	GP	GS	MPG	FG%	3P%	FT%	RPG	APG	SPG	BPG	TO	PPG
2019	Chicago	20	0	7.6	.316	.276	.800	0.9	0.4	0.3	0.1	**0.2**	2.4
2020	Dallas	22	4	20.0	.417	.317	.733	2.4	1.4	0.7	**0.4**	0.6	5.0
2021	Seattle	27	24	21.0	**.456**	.351	.731	**3.5**	1.7	0.7	0.3	1.1	7.0
2022	Los Angeles	32	**29**	**29.5**	.373	**.352**	.837	3.0	**1.9**	**1.0**	0.2	1.1	**9.7**
2023	Did not play (maternity leave)												
2024	Indiana	**37**	15	18.2	.349	.330	**.960**	2.3	1.4	0.3	0.2	0.5	4.3
2025	Seattle	Did not play (injury)											
2026	Seattle	32	1	15.3	.405	.321	.786	2.1	0.8	0.8	0.1	0.5	4.4
**Career**	6 years, 5 teams	170	73	19.2	.391	.334	.816	2.4	1.3	0.6	0.2	0.7	5.6

==== Playoffs ====
WNBA playoff statistics
Year	Team	GP	GS	MPG	FG%	3P%	FT%	RPG	APG	SPG	BPG	TO	PPG
2019	Chicago	**2**	0	2.0	—	—	—	0.5	**0.5**	0.0	0.0	**0.0**	0.0
2022	Seattle	1	**1**	**35.0**	**.600**	**.667**	**1.000**	**5.0**	0.0	**1.0**	0.0	1.0	**18.0**
2024	Indiana	1	0	5.0	.000	—	—	0.0	0.0	0.0	0.0	**0.0**	0.0
**Career**	3 years, 3 teams	4	1	11.0	.545	.667	1.000	1.5	0.3	0.3	0.0	0.3	4.5

=== College ===
NCAA statistics
Year	Team	GP	GS	MPG	FG%	3P%	FT%	RPG	APG	SPG	BPG	TO	PPG
2015–16*	Connecticut	**37**	22	23.5	.493	.394	.837	3.4	2.2	1.0	0.2	**1.2**	11.0
2016–17	Connecticut	**37**	**37**	32.1	.486	.420	.840	3.9	3.2	**1.5**	0.3	1.4	**20.2**
2017–18	Connecticut	32	32	29.7	**.530**	**.475***	.835	4.5	3.8	1.2	0.2	1.3	17.4
2018–19	Connecticut	34	34	**33.1**	.453	.376	**.876**	**6.3**	**3.9**	1.2	**0.6**	1.6	18.5
**Career**		140	125	29.6	.491	.416	.847	4.5	3.3	1.2	0.3	1.4	16.8

== Off the court ==
=== Personal life ===
Samuelson was born in Fullerton, California. Her father Jon played basketball at Cal State Fullerton and professionally in Europe. Her mother Karen was a netball player from England. Katie Lou has two older sisters who both played at Stanford: Bonnie, who after college decided to instead study optometry; and Karlie, who has played in the WNBA and currently plays for the Portland Fire.

She became engaged to fellow basketball player Devin Cannady on February 4, 2022; they got married on April 22, 2023. Samuelson revealed on February 10, 2023, via Instagram that she and Cannady were expecting a baby, and their daughter was born on August 4.

=== Philanthropy ===
In February 2024, Samuelson joined the WNBA Changemakers Collective and their collaboration with VOICEINSPORT (VIS) as a mentor, "aimed at keeping girls in sport and developing diverse leaders on the court and beyond the game."

== See also ==
- List of NCAA Division I women's basketball career 3-point scoring leaders
