= Valencia Basket (women) =

Spanish basketball club

- Nickname: Taronjas (Oranges); Naranja Mecánica (Clockwork Orange)
- Leagues: Liga Femenina Endesa; EuroLeague Women
- Founded: 2014; 12 years ago
- Arena: Roig Arena
- Capacity: 15,600
- Location: Valencia, Spain
- Team colors: Orange and Blue
- President: Vicent J. Solá
- Head coach: Rubén Burgos
- Ownership: Juan Roig
- Championships: 4 Spanish Women’s League; 2 Spanish Cup; 3 Spanish SuperCup; 1 EuroCup; 1 Europe SuperCup
- Website: valenciabasket.com
Home	Away	Third

Valencia Basket Club, S. A. D. is a Spanish professional women's basketball team based in Valencia, Spain. The team was started in 2014 and promoted to Liga Femenina Endesa in 2018, currently plays in the Liga Femenina Endesa and EuroLeague with home games played at the Roig Arena, with a capacity of up to 20,000 spectators. It is the women's team of the namesake club.

The orange club has a total of thirteen official titles in the men's section and eleven in the women's section. Valencia is the only Spanish club to win the top basketball category in Spain in both sections: the 2016-17 ACB (in addition to two runner-up finishes) and the 2022-23, 2023-24, 2024-25 and 2025-26 Women’s League, as well as the EuroCup (ULEB Cup) on four occasions, where it is the most successful club in the competition, and the 2020–21 EuroCup Women.

The club is owned by retail tycoon Juan Roig.

== History ==
The women's team of Valencia Basket was created in 2014 after integrating the youth teams of Ros Casares Valencia, former EuroLeague Women champion club which dissolved its senior squad in 2012, into the structure of the club.

In its first season, Valencia Basket played in Primera División, the third tier of Spanish women's basketball.

The club promoted in 2016 to Liga Femenina 2, and two years later, it qualified for the promotion playoffs to the top tier as champions of the Group B and achieved promotion to Liga Femenina, the top tier of Spanish women's basketball, in front of 6,200 spectators. In their debut season, Valencia Basket reached the semifinals.

== Season by season ==
Season	Tier	Division	Pos.	Copa de la Reina	European competitions			Other cups	
2014–15	3	1ª División	2nd						
2015–16	3	1ª División	1st						
2016–17	2	Liga Femenina 2	10th						
2017–18	2	Liga Femenina 2	1st						
2018–19	1	Liga Femenina	4th	Quarterfinalist					
2019–20	1	Liga Femenina	4th	Semifinalist	2 EuroCup	QF	9–1		
2020–21	1	Liga Femenina	2nd	Finalist	2 EuroCup	C	7–0	FIBA SuperCup	C
2021–22	1	Liga Femenina	2nd	Semifinalist	2 EuroCup	QF	10–2	Supercopa	C
2022–23	1	Liga Femenina	1st	Semifinalist	1 EuroLeague	QF	10–7	Supercopa	RU
2023–24	1	Liga Femenina	1st	Champions	1 EuroLeague	RS	8–6	Supercopa	C
2024–25	1	Liga Femenina	1st	Quarterfinalist	1 EuroLeague	4th	5-1	Supercopa	C

== Players ==
=== Current roster ===

Note: Flags indicate national team eligibility at FIBA-sanctioned events. Players may hold other non-FIBA nationalities not displayed.

Valencia Basket roster
Players
Coaches

Pos.	No.	Nat.	Name	Ht.	Age
PG	1	(United States) (Germany)	Peterson, Alexis	1.65 m (5 ft 5 in)	31 – 20 June 1995
C	2	(Hungary)	Takács-Kiss, Virág	1.94 m (6 ft 4 in)	28 – 12 April 1998
SF	4	(Nigeria)	Balogun, Elizabeth	1.85 m (6 ft 1 in)	26 – 9 September 2000
SG	6	(Spain)	Buenavida, Elena	1.74 m (5 ft 9 in)	22 – 8 March 2004
SF	7	(France)	Chery, Kendra	1.87 m (6 ft 2 in)	19 – 16 July 2007
PF	8	(Spain)	Araújo, María	1.82 m (6 ft 0 in)	29 – 1 August 1997
PG	10	(Spain)	Romero, Leticia	1.72 m (5 ft 8 in)	31 – 28 May 1995
C	11	(Poland)	Borkowska, Kamila	2.01 m (6 ft 7 in)	24 – 26 July 2002
SF	13	(Spain)	Pueyo, Helena	1.83 m (6 ft 0 in)	25 – 13 February 2001
PF	14	(Spain)	Carrera, Raquel	1.88 m (6 ft 2 in)	25 – 31 October 2001
PF	16	(Spain)	Suárez, Marta	1.91 m (6 ft 3 in)	24 – 7 May 2002
SG	18	(Spain)	Flórez, Alicia	1.75 m (5 ft 9 in)	22 – 19 April 2004
PF	24	(United States)	Jenkins, Alisia	1.85 m (6 ft 1 in)	32 – 21 February 1994

Head coach

- (Spain) Javier Torralba

Assistant coach(es)

- (Spain) Roberto Hernández
- (Spain) Mireia Capdevila
- (Spain) Marta Sorlí
- (Spain) Jago Pérez

Legend

- (C) Team captain
- Injured

- Roster
Updated: 6 October 2026
