= María Araújo =

Spanish basketball player

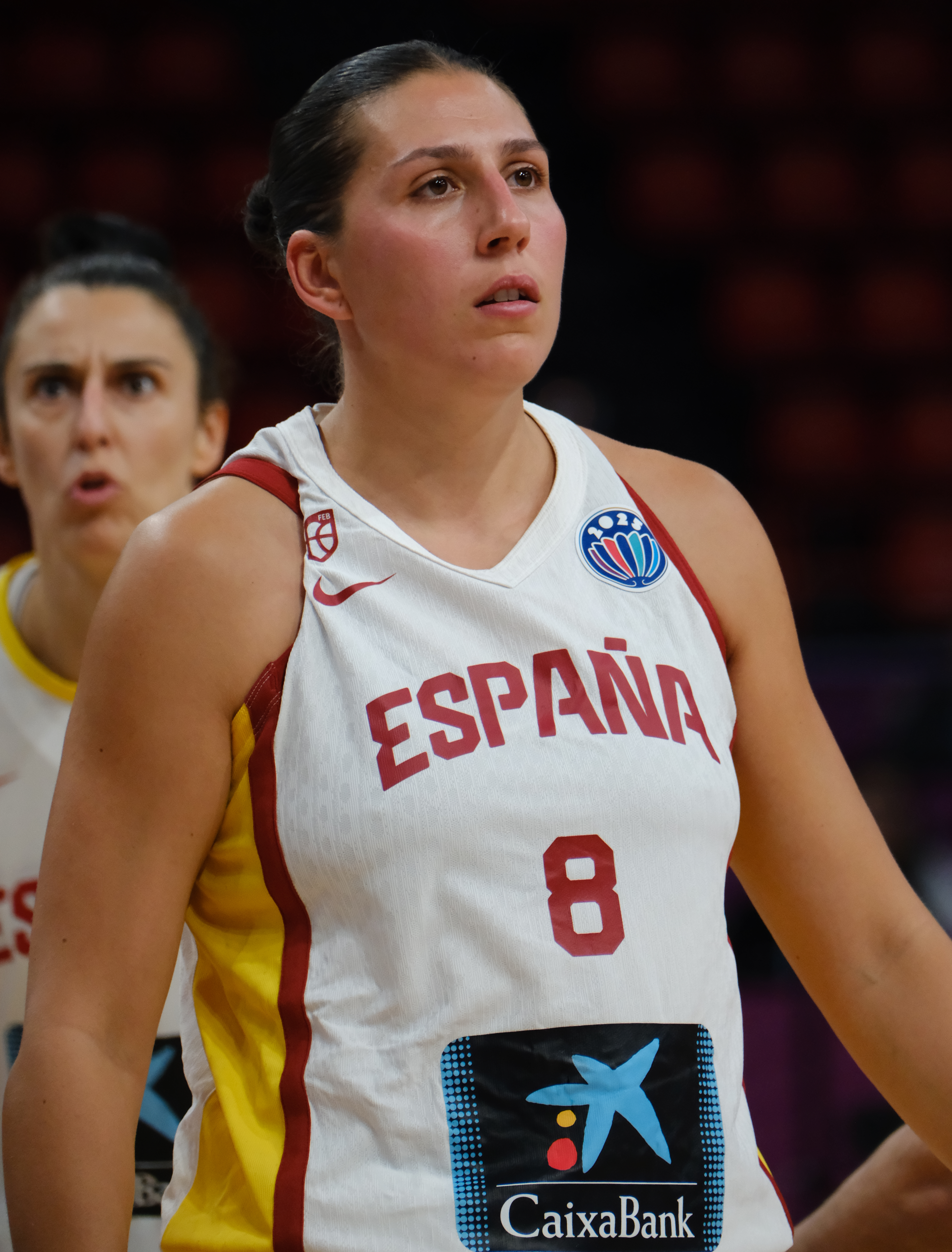

No. 8 – Valencia Basket
- Position: Power forward / Small forward
- League: LF

Personal information
- Born: 1 August 1997 (age 29) Vigo
- Listed height: 180 cm (5 ft 11 in)

Career history
- 2012-2015: Celta de Vigo Baloncesto (LF2)
- 2015-2018: Universitario de Ferrol
- 2018-2019: Wisła Can-Pack Kraków
- 2019-2023: Uni Girona CB
- 2023-2025: ÇBK Mersin
- 2025-present: Valencia Basket

Career highlights
- Spanish Cup winner (2021); FIBA Europe U-20 Championship MVP (2017)

María Araújo

María Pérez Araújo (born 1 August 1997), known professionally as María Araújo is a Spanish basketball player for Valencia Basket. She was the MVP at the 2017 FIBA Europe Under-20 Championship for Women, where the Spain women's national under-20 basketball team won the gold medal. In November 2017 she received her first call-up for the senior national team. In 2018 she signed for Polish team Wisła Can-Pack Kraków. In 2019 she signed for Spanish team Uni Girona CB.

== Club career ==
Araújo started in the youth levels of Celta de Vigo Baloncesto, where her mother had played professionally. She played her first game with the senior team in the Spanish second tier at 14, where she continued until 2015. She played the next three seasons for Universitario de Ferrol in the Spanish top tier. In May 2018 she signed for the Polish team Wisła Can-Pack Kraków. In 2019 she signed for Spanish team Uni Girona CB.

=== European cups stats ===
Season	Team	GP	MPP	PPP	RPP	APP
2018-19 EuroCup	(Poland) Wisła Can-Pack Kraków	10	24.7	6.7	6.6	2.1
2019-20 EuroLeague	(Spain) Uni Girona CB	14	21.7	3.7	5.7	0.6
2020-21 EuroLeague	(Spain) Uni Girona CB	9	24.7	10.4	6.2	0.8

== National team ==
She played in the youth teams of the Spanish national team from 2014 to 2017, reaching the final in all the tournaments that she played. She made her debut with the senior team in 2017 at 20 years of age, for the EuroBasket Women 2019 qualification games:

- 2014 FIBA Under-17 World Championship for Women (youth)
- 2015 FIBA Europe Under-18 Championship for Women (youth)
- 2017 FIBA Europe Under-20 Championship for Women (youth) (MVP)
