= 2019–20 WPBL season =

Women's basketball season

Russian Women's Basketball Premier League
- League: Russian Women's Basketball Premier League
- Season: 2019–20
- Duration: 29 September 2019 – 16 February 2020 (First round); 22 February – 15 March 2020 (Second round)
- Games played: 94
- Teams: 9

Finals
- Champions: UMMC Ekaterinburg (14th title)
- Runners-up: Dynamo Kursk

Records
- Biggest home win: MBA Moscow 114–53 Spartak Noginsk (20 October 2019)
- Biggest away win: Dynamo Novosibirsk 22–86 Dynamo Kursk (3 October 2019); Dynamo Moscow 54–118 UMMC (14 December 2019); Sparta & K 54–118 UMMC (1 March 2020)
- Winning streak: 20 games UMMC Ekaterinburg
- Losing streak: 22 games Dynamo Moscow

The 2019–20 WPBL season is the 29th season of the Russian Women's Basketball Premier League. UMMC Ekaterinburg are the defending champions.

On 16 March 2020, the Russian Basketball Federation temporarily suspended all competitions due to the COVID-19 pandemic. On 27 March, the competition was ended prematurely. UMMC Ekaterinburg was named champions.

== First round ==
Pos	Team	Pld	W	L	PF	PA	PD	Pts	Qualification
1	UMMC Ekaterinburg	16	16	0	1499	956	+543	32	1st–5th place
2	Dynamo Kursk	16	14	2	1345	1051	+294	30	1st–5th place
3	Nadezhda Orenburg	16	10	6	1162	1065	+97	26	1st–5th place
4	Sparta & K	16	8	8	1180	1262	−82	24	1st–5th place
5	Enisey Krasnoyarsk	16	8	8	1158	1146	+12	24	1st–5th place
6	Dynamo Novosibirsk	16	7	9	1093	1230	−137	23	6th–9th place
7	MBA Moscow	16	6	10	1191	1174	+17	22	6th–9th place
8	Spartak Noginsk	16	3	13	1060	1337	−277	19	6th–9th place
9	Dynamo Moscow	16	0	16	932	1399	−467	16	6th–9th place

Source: RBF

== Second round ==
=== 1st–5th place ===
Pos	Team	Pld	W	L	PF	PA	PD	Pts	Qualification
1	UMMC Ekaterinburg	20	20	0	1901	1219	+682	40	Playoffs
2	Dynamo Kursk	20	17	3	1673	1357	+316	37	Playoffs
3	Nadezhda Orenburg	20	11	9	1438	1362	+76	31	Playoffs
4	Sparta & K	20	9	11	1425	1600	−175	29	Playoffs
5	Enisey Krasnoyarsk	20	9	11	1432	1467	−35	29	Playoffs

Source: RBF

=== 6th–9th place ===
Pos	Team	Pld	W	L	PF	PA	PD	Pts	Qualification
6	MBA Moscow	22	12	10	1683	1505	+178	34	Playoffs
7	Dynamo Novosibirsk	22	10	12	1522	1648	−126	32	Playoffs
8	Spartak Noginsk	22	6	16	1430	1771	−341	28	Playoffs
9	Dynamo Moscow	22	0	22	1289	1864	−575	22	

Source: RBF

== Playoffs ==
Quarterfinals
1
8
4
5
2
7
3
6

Semifinals

Final
Third place

== Russian clubs in European competitions ==
Club	Competition	Progress
UMMC Ekaterinburg	EuroLeague	Quarterfinals
Nadezhda Orenburg	EuroLeague	Quarterfinals
Dynamo Kursk	EuroLeague	Regular season
Dynamo Kursk	EuroCup	Quarterfinals
Enisey Krasnoyarsk	EuroCup	Round of 16
MBA Moscow	EuroCup	Round of 16
Sparta & K	EuroCup	Round of 8
Spartak Noginsk	EuroCup	Qualification round
