= 2016–17 EuroCup Women =

- League: EuroCup Women
- Sport: Basketball

Regular season

Final
- Champions: (Turkey) Yakın Doğu Üniversitesi
- Runners-up: (Turkey) Bellona AGÜ

EuroCup Women seasons
- ← 2015–16 2017–18 →

The 2016–17 EuroCup Women is the fifteenth edition of FIBA Europe's second-tier international competition for women's basketball clubs under such name.

== Teams ==
Teams were confirmed by FIBA Europe on 22 June 2016.

Regular season
Conference 1		Conference 2	
(Russia) Sparta&K Moscow Region (4th)	(Hungary) Aluinvent DVTK Miskolc (4th)	(France) Cavigal Nice Basket (3rd)	(Belgium) Mithra Castors Braine (1st)
(Russia) PBC MBA Moscow (5th)	(Slovakia) Good Angels Košice (1st)	(France) Basket Landes (4th)	(Belgium) Belfius Namur Capitale (2nd)
(Russia) Dynamo Novosibirsk (6th)	(Lithuania) Hoptrans Sirenos (1st)	(Czech Republic) Basketball Nymburk (2nd)	(Sweden) Luleå BBK (1st)
(Turkey) AGÜ Spor (4th)	(Israel) Maccabi Bnot Ashdod (1st)	(Spain) Spar CityLift Girona (2nd)	(Sweden) Udominate Basket (2nd)
(Turkey) Galatasaray Odeabank (5th)	(Latvia) TTT Riga (1st)	(Italy) Virtus Eirene Ragusa (3rd)	(Germany) TSV 1880 Wasserburg (1st)
(Hungary) PINKK-Pécsi 424 (3rd)	(Greece) Olympiacos (1st)	(Italy) Umana Reyer Venezia (4th)	(Portugal) Clube União Sportiva (1st)
Qualification round
Conference 1		Conference 2	
(Russia) Enisey Krasnoyarsk (7th)	(Turkey) Yakın Doğu Üniversitesi(8th)*	(France) Flammes Carolo Basket (6th)	(Germany) Stars Keltern (4th)
(Russia) Chevakata (8th)	(Hungary) PEAC-Pécs (5th)	(France) Nantes Reze (8th)	(Germany) Eisvögel USC Freiburg (9th)
(Turkey) İstanbul Üniversitesi (6th)	(Hungary) Cegléd (6th)	(Czech Republic) Valosun KP Brno (5th)	(Switzerland) Elfic Fribourg Basket (2nd)
(Turkey) Canik Belediye (7th)	(Slovakia) Piešťanské Čajky (2nd)	(Poland) Basket 90 Gdynia (5th)	(Netherlands) Amsterdam Angels (n/a)

* Since Northern Cyprus is not a member of FIBA, Northern Cypriot Yakin Dogu University registered in Turkey's basketball league to compete in FIBA Eurocup.

== Pots ==
Draw seedings for Conference 1 Qualifiers:

Seed1	Seed2
(Turkey) İstanbul Üniversitesi	(Slovakia) Piešťanské Čajky
(Hungary) PEAC-Pécs	(Turkey) Canik Belediye
(Russia) Chevakata	(Hungary) Cegléd
(Russia) Enisey Krasnoyarsk	(Turkey) Yakın Doğu Üniversitesi

Draw seedings for Conference 1 Regular Season:

Seed1	Seed2	Seed3	Seed4
(Turkey) Galatasaray Odeabank	(Hungary) Aluinvent DVTK Miskolc	(Russia) Dynamo Novosibirsk	Winner Qualifier 1
(Russia) Sparta&K Moscow Region	(Israel) Maccabi Bnot Ashdod	(Russia) PBC MBA Moscow	Winner Qualifier 2
(Turkey) AGÜ Spor	(Hungary) PINKK-Pécsi 424	(Lithuania) Hoptrans Sirenos	Winner Qualifier 3
(Slovakia) Good Angels Košice	(Latvia) TTT Riga	(Greece) Olympiacos	Winner Qualifier 4

Draw seedings for Conference 2 Qualifiers:

Seed1	Seed2
(France) Nantes Reze	(Netherlands) Amsterdam Angels
(France) Flammes Carolo Basket	(Poland) Basket 90 Gdynia
(Czech Republic) Valosun KP Brno	(Germany) Stars Keltern
(Switzerland) Elfic Fribourg Basket	(Germany) Eisvögel USC Freiburg

Draw seedings for Conference 2 Regular Season:

Seed1	Seed2	Seed3	Seed4
(Belgium) Mithra Castors Braine	(Czech Republic) Basketball Nymburk	(Sweden) Luleå BBK	Winner Qualifier 5
(France) Basket Landes	(Italy) Umana Reyer Venezia	(Portugal) Clube União Sportiva	Winner Qualifier 6
(Belgium) Belfius Namur Capitale	(Sweden) Udominate Basket	(France) Cavigal Nice Basket	Winner Qualifier 7
(Germany) TSV 1880 Wasserburg	(Spain) Spar CityLift Girona	(Italy) Virtus Eirene Ragusa	Winner Qualifier 8

== Qualification round ==
=== Conference 1 ===
Team 1	Agg.	Team 2	1st leg	2nd leg
PEAC-Pécs (Hungary)	142–138	(Slovakia) Piešťanské Čajky	64–74	78–64
Canik Belediye (Turkey)	152–140	(Russia) Chevakata	82–79	70–61
Yakın Doğu Üniversitesi (Turkey)	139–121	(Turkey) İstanbul Üniversitesi	82–53	57–68
Cegléd (Hungary)	159–139	(Russia) Enisey Krasnoyarsk	94–72	65–67

=== Conference 2 ===
Team 1	Agg.	Team 2	1st leg	2nd leg
Basket 90 Gdynia (Poland)	126–149	(Switzerland) Elfic Fribourg Basket	74–64	52–85
Eisvögel USC Freiburg (Germany)	121–151	(France) Flammes Carolo Basket	64–71	57–80
Amsterdam Angels (Netherlands)	148–164	(France) Nantes Reze	66–87	82–77
Stars Keltern (Germany)	142–114	(Czech Republic) Valosun KP Brno	69–59	73–55

== Group stage ==
=== Conference 1 ===
==== Group A ====
Pos	Team	Pld	W	L	PF	PA	PD	Pts	Qualification	MAC	CEG	SPA	HOP
1	(Israel) Maccabi Bnot Ashdod	6	5	1	434	389	+45	11	Advance to round of 16	—	63–59	63–50	84–65
2	(Hungary) VBW Cegléd	6	4	2	425	382	+43	10	Advance to round of 16	81–82	—	62–50	68–60
3	(Russia) Sparta&K Moscow Region	6	2	4	383	402	−19	8		60–71	66–79	—	78–59
4	(Lithuania) Hoptrans Sirenos	6	1	5	387	456	−69	7		74–71	61–76	68–79	—

Source: FIBA.com
Rules for classification: 1) Points; 2) Head-to-head record; 3) Head-to-head point differential. 4) General point differential 5) Points scored 6) Sum of quotients of points scored and points allowed in each Regular Season game

==== Group B ====
Pos	Team	Pld	W	L	PF	PA	PD	Pts	Qualification	AGÜ	PEA	DMO	PEC
1	(Turkey) Bellona AGÜ	6	6	0	444	370	+74	12	Advance to round of 16	—	74–73	81–69	65–47
2	(Hungary) PEAC-Pécs	6	3	3	436	391	+45	9	Advance to round of 16	62–69	—	87–61	71–48
3	(Russia) MBA Moscow	6	3	3	398	436	−38	9		51–71	73–69	—	67–63
4	(Hungary) PINKK-Pécsi 424	6	0	6	351	432	−81	6		62–84	66–74	65–71	—

Source: FIBA.com
Rules for classification: 1) Points; 2) Head-to-head record; 3) Head-to-head point differential. 4) General point differential 5) Points scored 6) Sum of quotients of points scored and points allowed in each Regular Season game

==== Group C ====
Pos	Team	Pld	W	L	PF	PA	PD	Pts	Qualification	GAL	TTT	DNO	CAN
1	(Turkey) Galatasaray	6	6	0	485	377	+108	12	Advance to round of 16	—	77–66	75–52	87–66
2	(Latvia) TTT Rīga	6	4	2	461	372	+89	10	Advance to round of 16	60–83	—	78–59	98–62
3	(Russia) Dynamo Novosibirsk	6	1	5	369	424	−55	7		58–73	56–65	—	89–70
4	(Turkey) Canik Belediye	6	1	5	371	513	−142	7		75–90	35–94	63–55	—

Source: FIBA.com
Rules for classification: 1) Points; 2) Head-to-head record; 3) Head-to-head point differential. 4) General point differential 5) Points scored 6) Sum of quotients of points scored and points allowed in each Regular Season game

==== Group D ====
Pos	Team	Pld	W	L	PF	PA	PD	Pts	Qualification	YAK	KOŠ	OLY	MIS
1	(Turkey) Yakın Doğu Üniversitesi	6	6	0	441	326	+115	12	Advance to round of 16	—	70–46	83–63	93–46
2	(Slovakia) Good Angels Košice	6	3	3	410	404	+6	9	Advance to round of 16	65–69	—	72–59	82–67
3	(Greece) Olympiacos	6	3	3	414	406	+8	9		53–55	85–78	—	93–58
4	(Hungary) Aluinvent Miskolc	6	0	6	338	467	−129	6		53–71	54–67	60–61	—

Source: FIBA.com
Rules for classification: 1) Points; 2) Head-to-head record; 3) Head-to-head point differential. 4) General point differential 5) Points scored 6) Sum of quotients of points scored and points allowed in each Regular Season game

=== Conference 2 ===
==== Group E ====
Pos	Team	Pld	W	L	PF	PA	PD	Pts	Qualification	RAG	NYM	NAN	NAM
1	(Italy) Virtus Eirene Ragusa	6	5	1	363	300	+63	11	Advance to round of 16	—	50–52	67–50	59–56
2	(Czech Republic) Nymburk	6	4	2	364	329	+35	10	Advance to round of 16	53–58	—	66–54	70–41
3	(France) Nantes Rezé	6	3	3	373	364	+9	9		46–65	72–62	—	74–52
4	(Belgium) Namur	6	0	6	298	405	−107	6		43–64	54–61	52–57	—

Source: FIBA.com
Rules for classification: 1) Points; 2) Head-to-head record; 3) Head-to-head point differential. 4) General point differential 5) Points scored 6) Sum of quotients of points scored and points allowed in each Regular Season game

==== Group F ====
Pos	Team	Pld	W	L	PF	PA	PD	Pts	Qualification	GIR	KEL	BRA	CUS
1	(Spain) Spar CityLift Girona	6	6	0	457	357	+100	12	Advance to round of 16	—	65–54	74–60	89–67
2	(Germany) Rutronik Stars Keltern	6	3	3	405	391	+14	9	Advance to round of 16	66–83	—	68–69	73–62
3	(Belgium) Mithra Castors Braine	6	3	3	424	355	+69	9		56–65	62–68	—	97–42
4	(Portugal) União Sportiva	6	0	6	313	496	−183	6		54–81	50–76	38–80	—

Source: FIBA.com
Rules for classification: 1) Points; 2) Head-to-head record; 3) Head-to-head point differential. 4) General point differential 5) Points scored 6) Sum of quotients of points scored and points allowed in each Regular Season game

==== Group G ====
Pos	Team	Pld	W	L	PF	PA	PD	Pts	Qualification	VEN	NIC	FRI	LAN
1	(Italy) Reyer Venezia	6	4	2	413	377	+36	10	Advance to round of 16	—	65–42	63–56	89–78
2	(France) Cavigal Nice	6	4	2	371	376	−5	10	Advance to round of 16	57–52	—	80–55	67–64
3	(Switzerland) Elfic Fribourg	6	2	4	360	391	−31	8		61–64	62–68	—	62–54
4	(France) Landes	6	2	4	419	419	0	8		83–80	78–57	62–64	—

Source: FIBA.com
Rules for classification: 1) Points; 2) Head-to-head record; 3) Head-to-head point differential. 4) General point differential 5) Points scored 6) Sum of quotients of points scored and points allowed in each Regular Season game

==== Group H ====
Pos	Team	Pld	W	L	PF	PA	PD	Pts	Qualification	FLA	WAS	UDO	LUL
1	(France) Flammes Carolo	6	6	0	484	367	+117	12	Advance to round of 16	—	69–62	83–72	79–47
2	(Germany) Wasserburg	6	3	3	475	396	+79	9	Advance to round of 16	51–70	—	82–83	75–59
3	(Sweden) Umeå Udominate	6	3	3	435	488	−53	9		68–86	66–99	—	73–71
4	(Sweden) Luleå	6	0	6	360	503	−143	6		67–97	49–86	67–73	—

Source: FIBA.com
Rules for classification: 1) Points; 2) Head-to-head record; 3) Head-to-head point differential. 4) General point differential 5) Points scored 6) Sum of quotients of points scored and points allowed in each Regular Season game

== Round of 16 ==
=== Qualified teams ===
The winners and runners-up of each of the eight groups in the group stage qualify for the final stages.

Group	Winners	Runners-up
A	(Israel) Maccabi Bnot Ashdod	(Hungary) VBW Cegléd
B	(Turkey) Bellona AGÜ	(Hungary) PEAC-Pécs
C	(Turkey) Galatasaray	(Latvia) TTT Rīga
D	(Turkey) Yakın Doğu Üniversitesi	(Slovakia) Good Angels Košice
E	(Italy) Virtus Eirene Ragusa	(Czech Republic) Nymburk
F	(Spain) Spar CityLift Girona	(Germany) Rutronik Stars Keltern
G	(Italy) Reyer Venezia	(France) Cavigal Nice
H	(France) Flammes Carolo	(Germany) Wasserburg

=== Seeding ===
The qualified teams are seeded in the round of 16 according to their results in the group stage.

Seed	Grp	Team	Pld	W	L	PF	PA	PD	Pts
1	H	(France) Carolo	6	6	0	484	367	+117	12
2	D	(Turkey) Yakın Doğu Üniversitesi	6	6	0	441	326	+115	12
3	C	(Turkey) Galatasaray	6	6	0	485	377	+108	12
4	F	(Spain) Spar CityLift Girona	6	6	0	457	357	+100	12
5	B	(Turkey) Bellona AGÜ	6	6	0	444	370	+74	12
6	E	(Italy) Virtus Eirene Ragusa	6	5	1	363	300	+63	11
7	A	(Israel) Maccabi Bnot Ashdod	6	5	1	434	389	+45	11
8	C	(Latvia) TTT Rīga	6	4	2	461	372	+89	10
9	A	(Hungary) VBW Ceglédi	6	4	2	425	382	+43	10
10	G	(Italy) Reyer Venezia	6	4	2	413	377	+36	10
11	E	(Czech Republic) Nymburk	6	4	2	364	329	+35	10
12	G	(France) Cavigal Nice	6	4	2	371	376	−5	10
13	H	(Germany) Wasserburg	6	3	3	475	396	+79	9
14	B	(Hungary) PEAC-Pécs	6	3	3	436	391	+45	9
15	F	(Germany) Rutronik Stars Keltern	6	3	3	405	391	+14	9
16	D	(Slovakia) Good Angels Košice	6	3	3	410	404	+6	9

Source: FIBA
Rules for classification: 1) Points; 2) Points difference; 3) Points scored.

=== Games ===
Seed in parentheses.

Team 1	Agg.	Team 2	1st leg	2nd leg
(16) Good Angels Košice (Slovakia)	141–136	(France) Flammes Carolo (1)	83–64	58–72
(15) Rutronik Stars Keltern (Germany)	120–161	(Turkey) Yakın Doğu Üniversitesi (2)	62–76	58–85
(14) PEAC-Pécs (Hungary)	116–152	(Turkey) Galatasaray (3)	67–71	49–81
(13) Wasserburg (Germany)	133–145	(Spain) Spar CityLift Girona (4)	62–66	71–79
(12) Cavigal Nice (France)	106–144	(Turkey) Bellona AGÜ (5)	50–78	56–66
(11) Nymburk (Czech Republic)	110–128	(Italy) Virtus Eirene Ragusa (6)	53–57	57–71
(10) Reyer Venezia (Italy)	130–103	(Israel) Maccabi Bnot Ashdod (7)	58–52	72–51
(9) VBW Ceglédi (Hungary)	130–127	(Latvia) TTT Rīga (8)	73–66	57–61

== Round of 8 ==
Team 1	Agg.	Team 2	1st leg	2nd leg
Good Angels Košice (Slovakia)	156–134	(Hungary) VBW Ceglédi	79–64	77–70
Reyer Venezia (Italy)	110–122	(Turkey) Yakın Doğu Üniversitesi	65–56	45–66
Virtus Eirene Ragusa (Italy)	133–145	(Turkey) Galatasaray	67–77	66–68
Spar CityLift Girona (Spain)	125–148	(Turkey) Bellona AGÜ	71–63	54–85

== Final bracket ==
=== Qualified teams ===
The quarter-finals involves eight teams: the four teams which qualified as winners of the Rounf of 8, the two fifth-placed and the two sixth-placed teams from the Euroleague Regular Season.

Each tie is played, as the Round of 16 and Round of 8, over two legs, with each team playing one leg at home.

Qualified from Round of 8	Transferred from Euroleague
(Turkey) Bellona AGÜ	(Poland) Wisła Can-Pack Kraków
(Turkey) Yakın Doğu Üniversitesi	(Turkey) Hatay BŞB
(Turkey) Galatasaray	(France) BLMA
(Slovakia) Good Angels Košice	(France) Villeneuve-d'Ascq

=== Bracket ===
Quarterfinals; March 7 and 10
(Poland) Wisła Can-Pack Kraków	57	76	133
(Turkey) Hatay BŞB	69	77	146
(France) BLMA	65	68	133
(Turkey) Bellona AGÜ	85	73	158
(Slovakia) Good Angels Košice	73	66	139
(Turkey) Galatasaray	62	82	144
(France) Villeneuve-d'Ascq	67	61	128
(Turkey) Yakın Doğu Üniversitesi	68	73	141

Semifinals; March 21 and 24
(Turkey) Hatay BŞB	65	58	123
(Turkey) Bellona AGÜ	71	64	135
(Turkey) Galatasaray	81	68	149
(Turkey) Yakın Doğu Üniversitesi	87	81	168

Finals; April 5 and 12
(Turkey) Bellona AGÜ	69	58	127
(Turkey) Yakın Doğu Üniversitesi	73	63	136

2016–17 EuroCup Women Champions

Yakın Doğu Üniversitesi
1st title

== See also ==
- 2016–17 EuroLeague Women
