= 2015–16 EuroCup Women =

- League: EuroCup Women
- Sport: Basketball

Regular season

Final
- Champions: (France) Tango Bourges Basket
- Runners-up: (France) Villeneuve-d'Ascq

EuroCup Women seasons
- ← 2014–15 2016–17 →

The 2015–16 EuroCup Women is the fourteenth edition of FIBA Europe's second-tier international competition for women's basketball clubs under such name.

== Teams ==
Teams and seedings were unveiled by FIBA Europe on 3 July 2015.

Regular season
Conference 1		Conference 2	
(Russia) Sparta&K Moscow Region (4th)	(Turkey) Orduspor (7th)	(Hungary) Aluinvent DVTK Miskolc (2nd)	(Czech Republic) Valosun KP Brno (5th)
(Russia) Chevakata (5th)	(Turkey) EB Edirnespor (8th)	(Hungary) PEAC-Pécs (3rd)	(Italy) Umana Reyer Venezia (3rd)
(Russia) NP SC Energia (6th)	(Sweden) Luleå BBK (1st)	(Hungary) UNI Győr (4th)	(Italy) Dike Basket Napoli (4th)
(Russia) Dynamo Moscow (7th)	(Sweden) Basket Umea (2nd)	(Hungary) PINKK-Pécsi 424 (5th)	(Germany) TSV 1880 Wasserburg (1st)
(Russia) Enisey Krasnoyarsk (8th)	(Bulgaria) Dunav Ruse (1st)	(France) Basket Landes (4th)	(Belgium) Belfius Namur Capitale (2nd)
(Turkey) Adana ASKİ (4th)	(Belarus) Tsmoki Minsk (1st)	(France) Union Angers (5th)	(Portugal) Sportiva Azores Airlines (1st)
(Turkey) İstanbul Üniversitesi (5th)	(Slovakia) Piešťanské Čajky (2nd)	(France) Nantes Rezé Basket (8th)	(ELW QR)
(Turkey) Beşiktaş (6th)		(Czech Republic) Basketball Nymburk (3rd)	
Qualification round
Conference 1		Conference 2	
(Austria) Flying Foxes SVS Post (1st)	(Latvia) TTT Rīga (1st)	(Netherlands) Orange Blizzards (1st)	(Switzerland) Elfic Fribourg Basket (2nd)

== Pots ==
Teams were first divided into conferences based on geographical location, then seeded based on their club rankings.

Conference 1
Pot 1	Pot 2	Pot 3	Pot 4
(Russia) Sparta&K Moscow Region	(Turkey) Beşiktaş Istanbul	(Turkey) Orduspor	(Turkey) EB Edirnespor
(Russia) Dynamo Moscow	(Bulgaria) WBC Dunav Ruse	(Russia) WBC Enisey Krasnoyarsk	(Slovakia) Piešťanské Čajky
(Turkey) İstanbul Üniversitesi	(Sweden) Udominate Basket	(Russia) NP SC Energia	(Sweden) Luleå BBK
(Russia) Chevakata Vologda	(Belarus) BC Tsmoki-Minsk	(Turkey) Adana ASKİ	Qualifier 1
Conference 2
Pot 1	Pot 2	Pot 3	Pot 4
Euroleague Women Qualifier ^{a}	(Hungary) PEAC-Pécs	(Czech Republic) Basketball Nymburk	(Italy) Umana Reyer Venezia
(Hungary) UNI Győr	(Germany) TSV 1880 Wasserburg	(Hungary) PINKK-Pécsi 424	(Italy) Dike Basket Napoli
(France) Nantes Rezé Basket	(Belgium) Belfius Namur Capitale	(France) Union Angers	(Portugal) Sportiva Azores Airlines
(France) Basket Landes	(Hungary) Aluinvent DVTK Miskolc	(Czech Republic) Valosun KP Brno	Qualifier 2

^a Following the withdrawal of BK Brno from both Euroleague and Eurocup competition for the year, Orange Blizzards and Fribourg both qualified for the final tournament. The spot previously held by the loser of the Euroleague qualifying round was awarded to Orange Blizzards.

== Group stage ==
=== Group A ===
Pos	Team	Pld	W	L	PF	PA	PD	Pts	Qualification	SPA	BEŞ	ADA	PIE
1	(Russia) Sparta&K Moscow Region	6	5	1	472	387	+85	11	Advance to round of 16	—	109 – 58	91 – 70	63 – 48
2	(Turkey) Beşiktaş Istanbul	6	3	3	443	475	−32	9	Advance to round of 16	76 – 66	—	87 – 70	75 – 79
3	(Turkey) Adana ASKİ	6	2	4	448	467	−19	8	Eliminated	67 – 73	91 – 82	—	63 – 72
4	(Slovakia) Piešťanské Čajky	6	2	4	389	423	−34	8	Eliminated	68 – 70	60 – 65	62 – 87	—

Updated to match(es) played on 17 December 2015. Source:

=== Group B ===
Pos	Team	Pld	W	L	PF	PA	PD	Pts	Qualification	ORD	TTT	DMO	UDO
1	(Turkey) Orduspor	6	4	2	468	425	+43	10	Advance to round of 16	—	80 – 78	87 – 72	87 – 68
2	(Latvia) TTT Riga	6	4	2	426	385	+41	10	Advance to round of 16	75 – 69	—	71 – 58	79 – 57
3	(Russia) Dynamo Moscow	6	4	2	408	420	−12	10	Eliminated	64 – 60	61 – 59	—	66 – 59
4	(Sweden) Udominate Basket	6	0	6	328	381	−53	6	Eliminated	68 – 85	60 – 64	84 – 87	—

Updated to match(es) played on 17 December 2015. Source:

=== Group C ===
Pos	Team	Pld	W	L	PF	PA	PD	Pts	Qualification	ENI	EDI	CHE	MIN
1	(Russia) WBC Enisey Krasnoyarsk	6	5	1	416	379	+37	11	Advance to round of 16	—	73 – 70	74 – 69	79 – 56
2	(Turkey) EB Edirnespor	6	4	2	433	407	+26	10	Advance to round of 16	70 – 68	—	97 – 94	73 – 61
3	(Russia) Chevakata Vologda	6	3	3	426	419	+7	9	Eliminated	64 – 69	65 – 62	—	65 – 58
4	(Belarus) BC Tsmoki-Minsk	6	0	6	330	400	−70	6	Eliminated	50 – 53	46 – 61	59 – 69	—

Updated to match(es) played on 17 December 2015. Source:

=== Group D ===
Pos	Team	Pld	W	L	PF	PA	PD	Pts	Qualification	IST	LUL	DUN	IVA
1	(Turkey) İstanbul Üniversitesi	6	6	0	466	385	+81	12	Advance to round of 16	—	97 – 82	83 – 71	72 – 59
2	(Sweden) Luleå BBK	6	3	3	467	480	−13	9	Advance to round of 16	77 – 86	—	77 – 74	82 – 71
3	(Bulgaria) WBC Dunav Ruse	6	2	4	408	424	−16	8	Eliminated	48 – 71	75 – 65	—	80 – 61
4	(Russia) NP SC Energia	6	1	5	383	435	−52	7	Eliminated	48 – 57	77 – 84	67 – 60	—

Updated to match(es) played on 17 December 2015. Source:

=== Group E ===
Pos	Team	Pld	W	L	PF	PA	PD	Pts	Qualification	VEN	NAN	WAS	PEC
1	(Italy) Umana Reyer Venezia	6	4	2	418	375	+43	10	Advance to round of 16	—	69 – 59	80 – 60	62 – 49
2	(France) Nantes Rezé Basket	6	4	2	440	407	+33	10	Advance to round of 16	73 – 65	—	85 – 74	88 – 57
3	(Germany) TSV 1880 Wasserburg	6	3	3	427	422	+5	9	Eliminated	73 – 68	78 – 79	—	72 – 55
4	(Hungary) PINKK-Pécsi 424	6	1	5	341	422	−81	7	Eliminated	61 – 74	64 – 56	55 – 70	—

Updated to match(es) played on 17 December 2015. Source:

=== Group F ===
Pos	Team	Pld	W	L	PF	PA	PD	Pts	Qualification	LAN	NYM	PEA	FRI
1	(France) Basket Landes	6	5	1	421	375	+46	11	Advance to round of 16	—	62 – 59	71 – 51	81 – 67
2	(Czech Republic) Basketball Nymburk	6	4	2	419	383	+36	10	Advance to round of 16	82 – 61	—	82 – 68	79 – 54
3	(Hungary) PEAC-Pécs	6	2	4	402	403	−1	8	Eliminated	62 – 79	84 – 43	—	64 – 65
4	(Switzerland) Elfic Fribourg Basket	6	1	5	357	438	−81	7	Eliminated	54 – 67	54 – 74	63 – 73	—

Updated to match(es) played on 17 December 2015. Source:

=== Group G ===
Pos	Team	Pld	W	L	PF	PA	PD	Pts	Qualification	MIS	NAP	BRN	ORA
1	(Hungary) Aluinvent DVTK Miskolc	6	6	0	451	379	+72	12	Advance to round of 16	—	68 – 64	83 – 58	79 – 57
2	(Italy) Mapei Dike Napoli	6	4	2	393	372	+21	10	Advance to round of 16	53 – 60	—	68 – 60	72 – 59
3	(Czech Republic) Valosun KP Brno	6	2	4	406	400	+6	8	Eliminated	73 – 77	62 – 64	—	72 – 49
4	(Netherlands) Orange Blizzards	6	0	6	361	460	−99	6	Eliminated	74 – 84	63 – 72	59 – 81	—

Updated to match(es) played on 16 December 2015. Source:

=== Group H ===
Pos	Team	Pld	W	L	PF	PA	PD	Pts	Qualification	CUS	ANG	NAM	GYO
1	(Portugal) Sportiva Azores Airlines	6	5	1	442	379	+63	11	Advance to round of 16	—	73 – 69	68 – 59	72 – 49
2	(France) Union Angers	6	4	2	425	400	+25	10	Advance to round of 16	73 – 72	—	88 – 84	69 – 51
3	(Belgium) Belfius Namur Capitale	6	3	3	426	429	−3	9	Eliminated	62 – 81	67 – 56	—	80 – 74
4	(Hungary) CMB Cargo UNI Győr	6	0	6	356	441	−85	6	Eliminated	67 – 76	53 – 70	62 – 74	—

Updated to match(es) played on 17 December 2015. Source:

== Round of 16 ==
Round of 16 was played on 7 and 14 January 2016.

Team #1	Agg.	Team #2	1st	2nd
Beşiktaş (Turkey)	152–148	(Turkey) İstanbul Üniversitesi	82–68	70–80
Luleå BBK (Sweden)	134–176	(Hungary) Aluinvent DVTK Miskolc	62–86	72–90
Dike Basket Napoli (Italy)	119–143	(Russia) Sparta&K Moscow Region	59–81	60–62
Union Angers (France)	130–125	(Portugal) Spoortiva Azores Airlines	72–58	58–67
EB Edirnespor (Turkey)	148–150	(France) Basket Landes	68–61	80–89
Nantes Rezé Basket (France)	136–121	(Russia) Enisey Krasnoyarsk	72–53	64–68
Basketball Nymburk (Czech Republic)	163–153	(Turkey) Orduspor	76–72	87–81
TTT Rīga (Latvia)	122–136	(Italy) Umana Reyer Venezia	61–67	61–69

== Round of 8 ==
Round of 8 was played on 28 January and 4 February 2016.

Team #1	Agg.	Team #2	1st	2nd
Beşiktaş (Turkey)	139–129	(Italy) Umana Reyer Venezia	75–67	64–62
Basketball Nymburk (Czech Republic)	114–146	(Hungary) Aluinvent DVTK Miskolc	64–69	50–77
Nantes Rezé Basket (France)	124–139	(Russia) Sparta&K Moscow Region	60–57	64–82
Union Angers (France)	92–118	(France) Basket Landes	37–55	55–63

== Quarter-finals ==
Quarter-finals will be played on 8 and 11 March 2016.

Team #1	Agg.	Team #2	1st	2nd
AGÜ Spor (Turkey)	142–139	(Turkey) Beşiktaş	79–68	63–71
Basket Landes (France)	146–123	(Hungary) Aluinvent DVTK Miskolc	89–65	57–58
Villeneuve-d'Ascq (France)	118–110	(Slovakia) Good Angels Košice	58–42	60–68
Tango Bourges Basket (France)	131–120	(Russia) Sparta&K Moscow Region	68–58	63–62

== Semifinals ==
Team #1	Agg.	Team #2	1st	2nd
AGÜ Spor (Turkey)	122–128	(France) Tango Bourges Basket	55–68	67–60
Villeneuve-d'Ascq (France)	150–108	(France) Basket Landes	80–54	70–54

== Final ==
Team #1	Agg.	Team #2	1st	2nd
Tango Bourges Basket (France)	105–93	(France) Villeneuve-d'Ascq	51–40	54–53

== See also ==
- 2015–16 EuroLeague Women
