= 2014–15 EuroCup Women =

- League: EuroCup Women
- Sport: Basketball

Regular season

Final
- Champions: (France) ESB Villeneuve-d'Ascq
- Runners-up: (Belgium) Royal Castors Braine

EuroCup Women seasons
- ← 2013–14 2015–16 →

The 2014–15 EuroCup Women is the thirteenth edition of FIBA Europe's second-tier international competition for women's basketball clubs under such name. It will be contested by 31 teams from 11 countries and will start on 6 November 2014.

== Teams ==
Key to colors
| Champion | Runner-up | Semifinalist | Quarterfinalist | Top 16 | Group stage |

Group stage teams
| Country (League) | Teams | Teams (rankings in 2013–14 national championships) | | | | |
|---|---|---|---|---|---|---|
| Russia (PremierLiga) | 5 | Dynamo Moscow (4) | Sparta&K M.R. Vidnoje (5) | Chevakata Vologda (6) | Enisey Krasnoyarsk (9) | Spartak Noginsk (10) |
| Turkey (TKBL) | 5 | İstanbul Üniversitesi (4) | Botaş SK (5) | Mersin BB SK (6) | Beşiktaş JK (7) | Orduspor (8) |
| Hungary (NB I/A) | 5 | PINKK-Pécsi 424 (1) | PEAC-Pécs (2) | UNIQA Euroleasing Sopron (3) | DVTK Miskolc (4) | UNI Győr (5) |
| France (LFB) | 4 | ESB Villeneuve-d'Ascq (3) | Basket Landes (4) | Nantes Rezé Basket (6) | Flammes Carolo Basket (7) | |
| Belgium (N1D) | 3 | Belfius Namur Capitale (1) | Royal Castors Braine (2) | Lotto Young Cats | | |
| Lithuania (LMKL) | 3 | Kibirkstis-VICI (1) | Fortūna Klaipėda (4) | Utena (7) | | |
| Belarus (PremierLiga) | 2 | BC Tsmoki-Minsk (1) | BC Horizont (2) | | | |
| Germany (DBBL) | 1 | TSV Wasserburg (1) | | | | |
| Portugal (LPB) | 1 | Quinta Dos Lombos (1) | | | | |
| Sweden (Basketligan) | 1 | Udominate Basket (1) | | | | |
| Israel (Ligat ha'Al) | 1 | Maccabi Bnot Ashdod (1) | | | | |

== Pots ==
As last season, the participating teams were in a first time divided into two conferences based on geographical criteria.

Conference 1
| Pot 1 | Pot 2 | Pot 3 | Pot 4 |
|---|---|---|---|
| (Russia) Dynamo Moscow | (Turkey) İstanbul Üniversitesi | (Belarus) BC Tsmoki-Minsk | (Lithuania) Kibirkstis-VICI |
| (Russia) Sparta&K M.R. Vidnoje | (Turkey) Mersin BB SK | (Belarus) BC Horizont | (Lithuania) BC Fortūna Klaipėda |
| (Russia) Chevakata Vologda | (Turkey) Botaş SK | (Russia) Enisey Krasnoyarsk | (Lithuania) Utena |
| (Russia) Spartak Noginsk | (Turkey) Beşiktaş JK | (Turkey) Orduspor | (Israel) Maccabi Bnot Ashdod |
Conference 2
| Pot 1 | Pot 2 | Pot 3 | Pot 4 |
| (Hungary) UNIQA Euroleasing Sopron | (France) Villeneuve-d'Ascq | (Germany) TSV Wasserburg | (Belgium) Belfius Namur |
| (Hungary) UNI Győr | (France) Basket Landes | (Hungary) PINKK-Pécsi 424 | (Belgium) Lotto Young Cats |
| (Hungary) PEAC-Pécs | (France) Nantes Rezé Basket | (Sweden) Udominate Basket | (Belgium) Royal Castors Braine |
| (Hungary) DVTK Miskolc | (France) Flammes Carolo Basket | (Portugal) Quinta Dos Lombos | |

== Group stage ==
The draw took place on 6 July 2014 in Munich, Germany. The teams were divided into seven groups of four and one group of three teams each. The top two teams advance to the Eight-Finals.

=== Group A ===
| Pos | Team | Pld | W | L | PF | PA | PD | Pts | ASH | BOT | MOS | KRA |
|---|---|---|---|---|---|---|---|---|---|---|---|---|
| 1 | (Israel) Maccabi Bnot Ashdod | 6 | 5 | 1 | 433 | 367 | +66 | 11 | | 62–72 | 78–71 | 69–46 |
| 2 | (Turkey) Botaş SK | 6 | 4 | 2 | 454 | 438 | +16 | 10 | 61–78 | | 76–56 | 92–90 |
| 3 | (Russia) Dynamo Moscow | 6 | 2 | 4 | 437 | 458 | −21 | 8 | 59–76 | 82–90 | | 81–74 |
| 4 | (Russia) Enisey Krasnoyarsk | 6 | 1 | 5 | 402 | 463 | −61 | 7 | 58–70 | 70–63 | 64–88 | |

=== Group B ===
| Pos | Team | Pld | W | L | PF | PA | PD | Pts | VOL | İST | UTE | TSM |
|---|---|---|---|---|---|---|---|---|---|---|---|---|
| 1 | (Russia) Chevakata Vologda | 6 | 5 | 1 | 400 | 382 | +18 | 11 | | 61–59 | 69–59 | 66–57 |
| 2 | (Turkey) İstanbul Üniversitesi | 6 | 4 | 2 | 439 | 343 | +96 | 10 | 77–69 | | 72–49 | 66–47 |
| 3 | (Lithuania) Utena | 6 | 2 | 4 | 387 | 419 | −32 | 8 | 68–70 | 72–70 | | 77–66 |
| 4 | (Belarus) BC Tsmoki-Minsk | 6 | 1 | 5 | 349 | 431 | −82 | 7 | 62–65 | 45–95 | 72–62 | |

=== Group C ===
| Pos | Team | Pld | W | L | PF | PA | PD | Pts | SPA | MER | ORD | KLA |
|---|---|---|---|---|---|---|---|---|---|---|---|---|
| 1 | (Russia) Sparta&K M.R. Vidnoje | 6 | 5 | 1 | 462 | 345 | +117 | 11 | | 85–77 | 81–48 | 86–37 |
| 2 | (Turkey) Mersin BB SK | 6 | 5 | 1 | 462 | 387 | +75 | 11 | 66–54 | | 79–66 | 92–61 |
| 3 | (Turkey) Orduspor | 6 | 2 | 4 | 410 | 420 | −10 | 8 | 49–66 | 62–65 | | 94–69 |
| 4 | (Lithuania) BC Fortūna Klaipėda | 6 | 0 | 6 | 354 | 536 | −182 | 6 | 68–90 | 59–83 | 60–91 | |

=== Group D ===
| Pos | Team | Pld | W | L | PF | PA | PD | Pts | BEŞ | NOG | HOR | KIB |
|---|---|---|---|---|---|---|---|---|---|---|---|---|
| 1 | (Turkey) Beşiktaş JK | 6 | 5 | 1 | 433 | 354 | +79 | 11 | | 93–72 | 56–46 | 72–52 |
| 2 | (Russia) Spartak Noginsk | 6 | 5 | 1 | 442 | 414 | +28 | 11 | 65–50 | | 103–100 | 66–51 |
| 3 | (Belarus) Horizont Minsk | 6 | 1 | 5 | 394 | 444 | −50 | 7 | 66–78 | 67–73 | | 51–73 |
| 4 | (Lithuania) Kibirkstis-VICI | 6 | 1 | 5 | 343 | 400 | −57 | 7 | 53–84 | 53–63 | 61–64 | |

=== Group E ===
| Pos | Team | Pld | W | L | PF | PA | PD | Pts | RCB | FLA | MIS | QDL |
|---|---|---|---|---|---|---|---|---|---|---|---|---|
| 1 | (Belgium) Royal Castors Braine | 6 | 6 | 0 | 512 | 357 | +155 | 12 | | 70–51 | 87–65 | 92–68 |
| 2 | (France) Flammes Carolo Basket | 6 | 4 | 2 | 405 | 416 | −11 | 10 | 58–85 | | 70–65 | 74–68 |
| 3 | (Hungary) DVTK Miskolc | 6 | 1 | 5 | 404 | 438 | −34 | 7 | 59–78 | 59–69 | | 80–53 |
| 4 | (Portugal) Quinta Dos Lombos | 6 | 1 | 5 | 395 | 505 | −110 | 7 | 56–100 | 69–83 | 81–76 | |

=== Group F ===
| Pos | Team | Pld | W | L | PF | PA | PD | Pts | ESB | UDO | UNI |
|---|---|---|---|---|---|---|---|---|---|---|---|
| 1 | (France) ESB Villeneuve-d'Ascq | 4 | 4 | 0 | 321 | 249 | +72 | 8 | | 83–59 | 82–59 |
| 2 | (Sweden) Udominate Basket | 4 | 2 | 2 | 258 | 283 | −25 | 6 | 53–75 | | 72–58 |
| 3 | (Hungary) UNI Győr | 4 | 0 | 4 | 260 | 307 | −47 | 4 | 78–79 | 65–74 | |

=== Group G ===
| Pos | Team | Pld | W | L | PF | PA | PD | Pts | NAN | PCP | WAS | LYC |
|---|---|---|---|---|---|---|---|---|---|---|---|---|
| 1 | (France) Nantes Rezé Basket | 6 | 5 | 1 | 424 | 335 | +89 | 11 | | 64–62 | 76–53 | 76–41 |
| 2 | (Hungary) PEAC-Pécs | 6 | 4 | 2 | 410 | 378 | +32 | 10 | 61–54 | | 86–74 | 81–57 |
| 3 | (Germany) TSV Wasserburg | 6 | 3 | 3 | 437 | 379 | +58 | 9 | 61–62 | 75–52 | | 86–63 |
| 4 | (Belgium) Lotto Young Cats | 6 | 0 | 6 | 312 | 491 | −179 | 6 | 57–92 | 54–68 | 40–88 | |

=== Group H ===
| Pos | Team | Pld | W | L | PF | PA | PD | Pts | SOP | NAM | LAN | PKP |
|---|---|---|---|---|---|---|---|---|---|---|---|---|
| 1 | (Hungary) UNIQA Euroleasing Sopron | 6 | 6 | 0 | 458 | 369 | +89 | 12 | | 83–76 | 81–54 | 65–59 |
| 2 | (Belgium) Belfius Namur | 6 | 3 | 3 | 401 | 422 | −21 | 9 | 54–83 | | 56–55 | 69–75 |
| 3 | (France) Basket Landes | 6 | 2 | 4 | 366 | 382 | −16 | 8 | 62–65 | 65–73 | | 61–52 |
| 4 | (Hungary) PINKK-Pécsi 424 | 6 | 1 | 5 | 366 | 418 | −52 | 7 | 64–81 | 61–73 | 55–69 | |

== Round of 16 ==
| Team #1 | Agg. | Team #2 | 1st | 2nd |
|---|---|---|---|---|
| Flammes Carolo Basket (France) | 126-148 | (Belgium) Royal Castors Braine | 74-87 | 52-61 |
| Belfius Namur (Belgium) | 108-145 | (France) ESB Villeneuve-d'Ascq | 54-60 | 54-85 |
| Udominate Basket (Sweden) | 155-184 | (Hungary) UNIQA Euroleasing Sopron | 79-103 | 76-81 |
| PEAC-Pécs (Hungary) | 106-135 | (Turkey) Beşiktaş JK | 56-63 | 50-72 |
| İstanbul Üniversitesi (Turkey) | 137-133 | (Russia) Sparta&K M.R. Vidnoje | 69-71 | 68-62 |
| Chevakata Vologda (Russia) | 117-131 | (Israel) Maccabi Bnot Ashdod | 67-71 | 50-60 |
| Nantes Rezé Basket (France) | 153-160 | (Turkey) Botaş SK | 84-70 | 69-90 |
| Spartak Noginsk (Russia) | 139-157 | (Turkey) Mersin BB SK | 59-82 | 80-75 |

== Quarterfinals ==
| Team #1 | Agg. | Team #2 | 1st | 2nd |
|---|---|---|---|---|
| Botaş SK (Turkey) | 115–137 | (France) ESB Villeneuve-d'Ascq | 63–76 | 52–61 |
| Maccabi Bnot Ashdod (Israel) | 165–137 | (Hungary) UNIQA Euroleasing Sopron | 78–77 | 87–60 |
| İstanbul Üniversitesi (Turkey) | 132–126 | (Turkey) Beşiktaş JK | 72–68 | 60–58 |
| Mersin BB SK (Turkey) | 153–154 | (Belgium) Royal Castors Braine | 77–72 | 76–82 |

== Semifinals ==
| Team #1 | Agg. | Team #2 | 1st | 2nd |
|---|---|---|---|---|
| İstanbul Üniversitesi (Turkey) | 138–155 | (Belgium) Royal Castors Braine | 73–77 | 65–78 |
| Maccabi Bnot Ashdod (Israel) | 122–129 | (France) ESB Villeneuve-d'Ascq | 66–57 | 56–72 |

== Final ==
| Team #1 | Agg. | Team #2 | 1st | 2nd |
|---|---|---|---|---|
| Royal Castors Braine (Belgium) | 121–137 | (France) ESB Villeneuve-d'Ascq | 68–64 | 53–73 |

2013–14 EuroCup Women champions

ESB Villeneuve-d'Ascq
1st title
