= 2013–14 EuroCup Women =

- League: EuroCup Women
- Sport: Basketball

Regular season
- Top scorer: (United States) DeLisha Milton-Jones (168 points)

Final
- Champions: (Russia) Dynamo Moscow
- Runners-up: (Russia) Dynamo Kursk

EuroCup Women seasons
- ← 2012–13 2014–15 →

The 2013–14 EuroCup Women was the twelfth edition of FIBA Europe's second-tier international competition for women's basketball clubs. It was contested by 28 teams from 11 countries, and started on 6 November 2013.

== Teams ==
Group stage teams
Country (League)	Teams	Teams (rankings in 2012–13 national championships)				
Russia (PremierLiga)	5	Dynamo Moscow (4)	Dynamo Kursk (5)	Chevakata Vologda (6)	Spartak Noginsk (8)	Dynamo-GUVD Novosibirsk (9)
Turkey (TKBL)	5	İstanbul Üniversitesi (4)	Mersin BB SK (5)	Tarsus Belediyespor (6)	Homend Antakya (7)	Botaş SK (10)
France (LFB)	4	Tarbes Gespe Bigorre (5)	Basket Landes (6)	Nantes Rezé Basket (7)	Villeneuve-d'Ascq (8)	
Hungary (NBI/A)	3	PINKK-Pécsi 424 (3)	DVTK Miskolc (4)	PEAC-Pécs (5)		
Belgium (N1D)	3	BC Namur-Capitale (1)	Lotto Young Cats (2)	3 Walloon Teams (3)		
Belarus (PremierLiga)	3	Olimpia Grodno (1)	BC Minsk 2006 (2)	Horizont Minsk (3)		
Romania (Liga I)	1	ACS Sepsi SIC (5)				
Bulgaria (NBL)	1	Dunav 8806 Ruse (1)				
Germany (DBBL)	1	TSV Wasserburg (1)				
Slovakia (Extraliga)	1	MBK Ružomberok (2)				
Sweden (Basketligan)	1	Norrköping Dolphins (1)				

== Pots ==
FIBA Europe divided the teams into two conferences based on geographical criteria.

Conference 1
Pot 1	Pot 2	Pot 3	Pot 4
(Russia) Dynamo Moscow	(Turkey) İstanbul Üniversitesi	(Russia) Spartak Noginsk	(Belarus) Horizont Minsk
(Russia) Dynamo Kursk	(Turkey) Mersin BB SK	(Turkey) Homend Antakya	(Belarus) Tsmoki Minsk
(Russia) Chevakata Vologda	(Turkey) Botaş SK	(Bulgaria) Dunav 8806 Ruse	(Belarus) Olimpia Grodno
(Russia) Dynamo-GUVD Novosibirsk	(Turkey) Tarsus Belediyespor	(Romania) ACS Sepsi SIC	(Sweden) Norrköping Dolphins
Conference 2
Pot 1	Pot 2	Pot 3	Pot 4
(France) Tarbes Gespe Bigorre	(France) Villeneuve-d'Ascq	(Hungary) PINKK-Pécsi 424	(Belgium) Lotto Young Cats
(France) Basket Landes	(Germany) TSV Wasserburg	(Hungary) DVTK Miskolc	(Belgium) Beflius Namur
(France) Nantes Rezé	(Slovakia) MBK Ružomberok	(Hungary) PEAC-Pécs	(Belgium) 3 Walloon Teams

== Group stage ==
The draw took place on 5 July 2013 in Munich, Germany. The teams were divided in seven groups of four teams each. The top two teams and the two best third-placed teams advanced to the Eight-Finals.

The top two teams of each group
The two best third-placed teams

=== Group A ===
	Team	Pld	W	L	PF	PA	Diff	Pts
1.	(Russia) Dynamo Kursk	6	6	0	463	361	+102	12
2.	(Turkey) Botaş SK	6	4	2	405	366	+39	10
3.	(Turkey) Homend Antakya	6	2	4	405	414	–9	8
4.	(Belarus) Tsmoki Minsk	6	0	6	345	477	–132	6

	KUR	ANT	BOT	TSM
(Russia) Dynamo Kursk		58–53	78–65	92–53
(Turkey) Antakya Belediyespor	76–82		66–73	83–64
(Turkey) Botaş SK	62–65	68–50		75–58
(Belarus) Tsmoki Minsk	52–88	75–58	49–62	

=== Group B ===
	Team	Pld	W	L	PF	PA	Diff	Pts
1.	(Sweden) Norrköping Dolphins	6	4	2	362	352	+10	10
2.	(Turkey) Mersin BB SK	6	4	2	444	441	+3	10
3.	(Russia) Chevakata Vologda	6	4	2	406	379	+27	10
4.	(Bulgaria) Dunav 8806 Ruse	6	0	6	366	436	–70	6

	VOL	DUN	MER	NOR
(Russia) Chevakata Vologda		84–65	65–73	56–50
(Bulgaria) Dunav 8806 Ruse	54–65		69–73	56–57
(Turkey) Mersin BB SK	83–80	91–62		56–66
(Sweden) Norrköping Dolphins	54–56	66–60	69–68	

=== Group C ===
	Team	Pld	W	L	PF	PA	Diff	Pts
1.	(Belarus) Horizont Minsk	6	4	2	412	395	+17	10
2.	(Turkey) Tarsus Belediyespor	6	3	3	475	441	+34	9
3.	(Russia) Dynamo-GUVD Novosibirsk	6	3	3	407	393	+14	9
4.	(Romania) Sepsi SIC	6	2	4	396	461	–65	8

	NOV	SEP	TAR	HOR
(Russia) Dynamo-GUVD Novosibirsk		88–64	69–66	70–43
(Romania) Sepsi SIC	57–53		88–93	53–47
(Turkey) Tarsus Belediyespor	91–62	83–69		70–75
(Belarus) Horizont Minsk	72–65	97–65	78–72	

=== Group D ===
	Team	Pld	W	L	PF	PA	Diff	Pts
1.	(Turkey) İstanbul Üniversitesi	6	5	1	504	407	+97	11
2.	(Russia) Dynamo Moscow	6	5	1	509	404	+105	11
3.	(Russia) Spartak Noginsk	6	2	4	392	457	–65	8
4.	(Belarus) Olimpia Grodno	6	0	6	358	495	–137	6

	MOS	NOG	İST	GRO
(Russia) Dynamo Moscow		88–57	92–86	84–54
(Russia) Spartak Noginsk	62-87		51–73	76–61
(Turkey) İstanbul Üniversitesi	82–71	90–71		78–49
(Belarus) Olimpia Grodno	63–87	58–75	73–95	

=== Group E ===
	Team	Pld	W	L	PF	PA	Diff	Pts
1.	(France) Basket Landes	6	6	0	474	384	+90	12
2.	(Hungary) DVTK Miskolc	6	3	3	447	393	+54	9
3.	(Germany) TSV Wasserburg	6	3	3	376	401	–25	9
4.	(Belgium) Lotto Young Cats	6	0	6	382	501	–119	6

	LAN	LYC	TSV	MIS
(France) Basket Landes		87–54	92–75	90–71
(Belgium) Lotto Young Cats	72–82		73–79	61–80
(Germany) TSV Wasserburg	45–51	67–62		57–54
(Hungary) DVTK Miskolc	67–72	106–60	69–53	

=== Group F ===
	Team	Pld	W	L	PF	PA	Diff	Pts
1.	(France) Villeneuve-d'Ascq	6	4	2	396	362	+34	10
2.	(France) Nantes Rezé	6	4	2	408	420	–12	10
3.	(Hungary) PEAC-Pécs	6	3	3	371	342	+29	9
4.	(Belgium) Beflius Namur	6	1	5	364	415	–51	7

	NAN	NAM	VIL	PEA
(France) Nantes Rezé		80–79	72–61	69–64
(Belgium) Beflius Namur	73–69		60–67	51–58
(France) Villeneuve-d'Ascq	83–56	73–53		49–64
(Hungary) PEAC-Pécs	60–62	68–48	57–63	

=== Groupe G ===
	Team	Pld	W	L	PF	PA	Diff	Pts
1.	(France) Tarbes Gespe Bigorre	6	4	2	408	359	+49	10
2.	(Slovakia) MBK Ružomberok	6	3	3	384	364	+20	9
3.	(Belgium) 3 Walloon Teams	6	3	3	416	442	–26	9
4.	(Hungary) PINKK-Pécsi 424	6	2	4	363	406	–43	8

	TGB	WAL	MBK	PIN
(France) Tarbes Gespe Bigorre		85–68	55–35	71–48
(Belgium) 3 Walloon Teams	77–71		76–68	77–71
(Slovakia) MBK Ružomberok	78–56	79–55		63–72
(Hungary) PINKK-Pécsi 424	53–70	69–63	50–62	

== Round of 16 ==
Team #1	Agg.	Team #2	1st	2nd
MBK Ružomberok (Slovakia)	101 – 147	(Russia) Dynamo Kursk	60-82	41-65
Tarsus Belediyespor (Turkey)	150 – 157	(France) Basket Landes	87-85	63-72
PEAC-Pécs (Hungary)	112 – 147	(Russia) Dynamo Moscow	55-69	57-78
DVTK Miskolc (Hungary)	131 – 169	(Turkey) İstanbul Üniversitesi	55-87	76-82
Nantes Rezé Basket (France)	129 – 111	(France) Tarbes Gespe Bigorre	72-54	57-57
Norrköping Dolphins (Sweden)	107 – 115	(Turkey) Botaş SK	53-55	54-60
Horizont Minsk (Belarus)	101 – 151	(France) Villeneuve-d'Ascq	61-65	40-86
Chevakata Vologda (Russia)	124 – 133	(Turkey) Mersin BB SK	61-59	63-74

== Quarterfinals ==
Team #1	Agg.	Team #2	1st	2nd
Villeneuve-d'Ascq (France)	149–142	(France) Basket Landes	64–72	85–70
Botaş SK (Turkey)	117-151	(Russia) Dynamo Moscow	64–72	53–79
Nantes Rezé Basket (France)	137-139	(Turkey) İstanbul Üniversitesi	74–74	63–65
Mersin BB SK (Turkey)	112-142	(Russia) Dynamo Kursk	66–76	46–66

== Semifinals ==
Team #1	Agg.	Team #2	1st	2nd
Villeneuve-d'Ascq (France)	155–169	(Russia) Dynamo Moscow	89–83	66–86
İstanbul Üniversitesi (Turkey)	132–143	(Russia) Dynamo Kursk	70–86	62–57

== Final ==
Team #1	Agg.	Team #2	1st	2nd
Dynamo Moscow (Russia)	158–150	(Russia) Dynamo Kursk	97-65	61-85

2013–14 EuroCup Women Champions

Dynamo Moscow
3rd title
