= 2016–17 EuroLeague Women =

EuroLeague Women
- Season: 2016–17
- Duration: 26 October 2016 – 16 April 2017
- Games played: 126
- Teams: 16 (Regular Season)

Finals
- Champions: (Russia) Dynamo Kursk
- Runners-up: (Turkey) Fenerbahçe
- Third place: (Russia) UMMC Ekaterinburg
- Fourth place: (Czech Republic) ZVVZ USK Praha
- Final Four MVP: (United States) Angel McCoughtry (Dynamo Kursk)

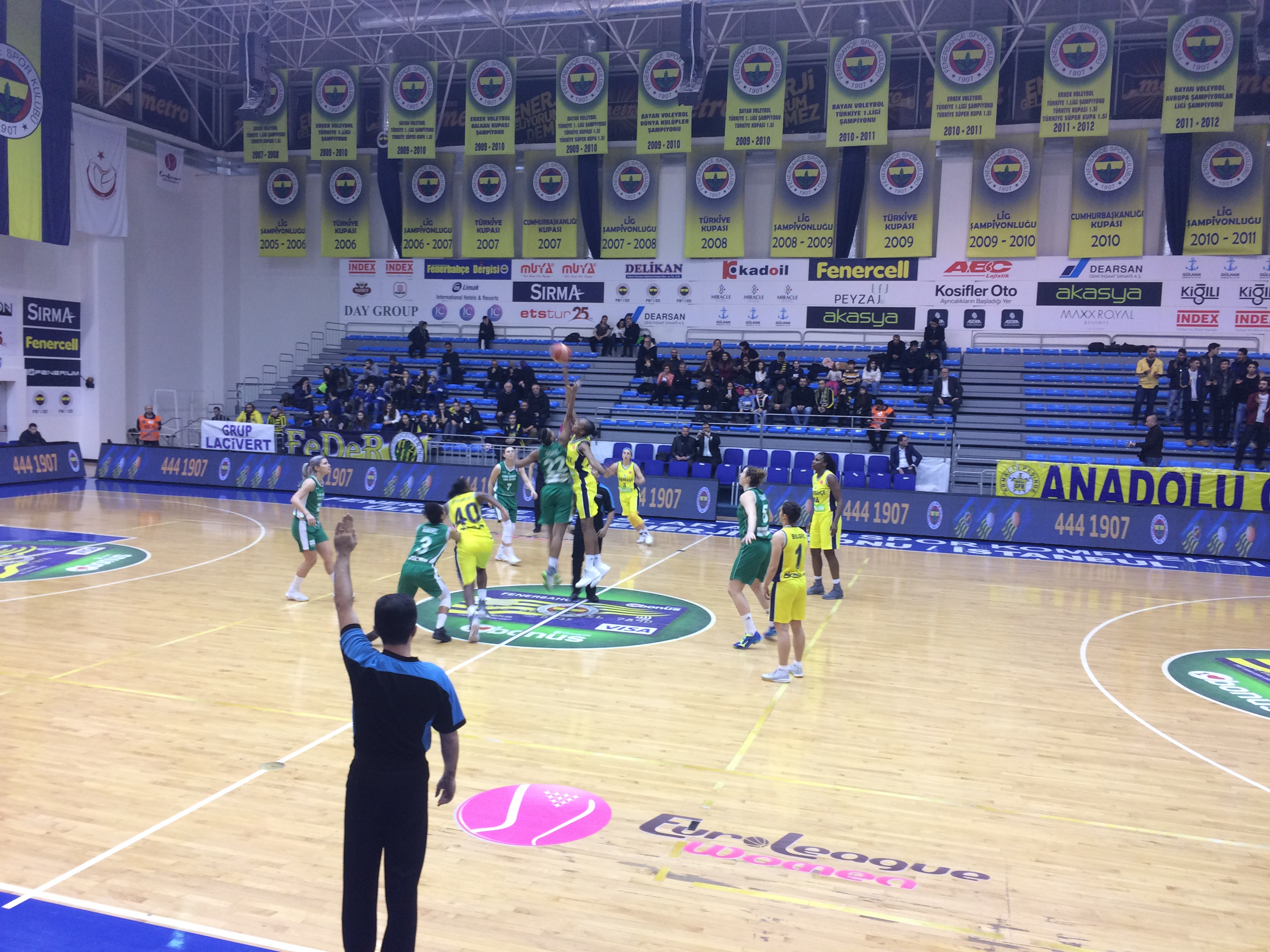
Fenerbahçe - Uni Györ match

The 2016–17 EuroLeague Women season is the 21st edition of EuroLeague Women under its current name. The season started on 26 October 2016.

== Teams ==
Teams were confirmed by FIBA Europe on 22 June 2016.

Regular season
(Russia) UMMC Ekaterinburg (1st)	(Turkey) Hatay BŞB (2nd)	(France) Villeneuve-d'Ascq (3rd)	(Poland) Wisła Can-Pack Kraków (1st)
(Russia) Nadezhda Orenburg (2nd)	(Turkey) Mersin BŞB (3rd)	(Czech Republic) ZVVZ USK Praha (1st)	(Spain) CB Avenida (1st)
(Russia) Dynamo Kursk (3rd)	(France) BLMA (1st)	(Hungary) Uniqa Sopron (1st)	(Italy) Famila Schio (1st)
(Turkey) Fenerbahçe (1st)	(France) Tango Bourges Basket (2nd)	(Hungary) UNI Győr (2nd)	
Qualification round
(Spain) CB Conquero (3rd)	(Poland) CCC Polkowice (4th)		

== Draw ==
- 17 teams registered for EuroLeague Women 2016–17, resulting in 15 direct qualifiers, and one preliminary round to be played between CB Conquero and CCC Polkowice. Following the withdrawal of Spanish club CB Conquero, CCC Polkowice promoted to the regular season.
- 16 EuroLeague Women teams will be drawn directly into two Regular Season groups of eight teams each. The clubs have been seeded based on the ranking of their performance in European club competitions in the last three seasons:

Seed	Regular Season	
1	(Russia) UMMC Ekaterinburg	(Turkey) Fenerbahçe
2	(Czech Republic) ZVVZ USK Praha	(Russia) Nadezhda Orenburg
3	(Russia) Dynamo Kursk	(France) Tango Bourges Basket
4	(France) Villeneuve-d'Ascq	(Poland) Wisła Can-Pack Kraków
5	(Italy) Famila Schio	(Spain) CB Avenida
6	(Hungary) Uniqa Sopron	(France) BLMA
7	(Turkey) Mersin BŞB	(Poland) CCC Polkowice
8	(Hungary) UNI Győr	(Turkey) Hatay BŞB

== Regular season ==
Location of teams of the 2016–17 Euroleague Women regular season.
Green: Group A; Red: Group B.

Regular season will start on October 26, 2016 and will finish on February 22, 2017.

The four top teams of each group will qualify to the quarterfinals.

If teams are level on record at the end of the Regular Season, tiebreakers are applied in the following order:

1. Head-to-head record.
2. Head-to-head point differential.
3. Point differential during the Regular Season.
4. Points scored during the regular season.
5. Sum of quotients of points scored and points allowed in each Regular Season game.

=== Group A ===
Pos	Team	Pld	W	L	PF	PA	PD	Pts	Qualification	KUR	FEN	USK	FAM	BLM	WIS	MER	UNI
1	(Russia) Dynamo Kursk	14	14	0	1096	856	+240	28	Advance to quarterfinals	—	86–79	69–66	70–64	65–43	96–59	73–67	90–55
2	(Turkey) Fenerbahçe	14	11	3	1010	916	+94	25	Advance to quarterfinals	69–72	—	75–71	77–64	69–63	71–60	75–52	66–53
3	(Czech Republic) ZVVZ USK Praha	14	9	5	1023	902	+121	23	Advance to quarterfinals	49–73	63–71	—	74–73	61–59	84–63	96–47	83–56
4	(Italy) Famila Schio	14	7	7	1012	929	+83	21	Advance to quarterfinals	75–79	73–75	71–63	—	70–53	80–54	71–64	77–65
5	(France) BLMA	14	7	7	869	917	−48	21	Transfer to EuroCup Women	50–88	58–56	55–58	69–66	—	74–68	76–63	69–50
6	(Poland) Wisła Can-Pack Kraków	14	5	9	950	1009	−59	19	Transfer to EuroCup Women	61–67	64–72	70–90	75–76	77–61	—	59–56	66–47
7	(Turkey) Mersin BŞB	14	2	12	906	1044	−138	16	Eliminated	70–84	73–89	69–75	65–61	68–74	74–83	—	65–74
8	(Hungary) UNI Győr	14	1	13	783	1076	−293	15	Eliminated	49–84	64–66	51–90	46–91	58–65	61–91	54–73	—

Source: FIBA.com

=== Group B ===
Pos	Team	Pld	W	L	PF	PA	PD	Pts	Qualification	EKA	NAD	AVE	BOU	HAT	VIL	SOP	POL
1	(Russia) UMMC Ekaterinburg	14	13	1	1190	900	+290	27	Advance to quarterfinals	—	88–81	74–68	81–66	103–40	91–69	82–61	94–57
2	(Russia) Nadezhda Orenburg	14	10	4	934	881	+53	24	Advance to quarterfinals	59–88	—	65–62	69–61	63–54	58–48	65–57	50–60
3	(Spain) Perfumerías Avenida	14	7	7	999	938	+61	21	Advance to quarterfinals	83–72	49–64	—	63–50	92–62	79–70	84–67	81–60
4	(France) Tango Bourges Basket	14	7	7	909	928	−19	21	Advance to quarterfinals	63–97	58–60	69–63	—	68–55	63–42	80–59	65–60
5	(Turkey) Hatay BŞB	14	7	7	912	1005	−93	21	Transfer to EuroCup Women	64–73	58–70	68–64	69–51	—	76–81	74–66	58–54
6	(France) Villeneuve-d'Ascq	14	6	8	969	1004	−35	20	Transfer to EuroCup Women	69–88	83–71	69–68	74–81	71–72	—	78–63	75–55
7	(Hungary) Uniqa Sopron	14	4	10	975	1087	−112	18	Eliminated	56–82	69–89	77–68	77–69	95–98	62–72	—	76–64
8	(Poland) CCC Polkowice	14	2	12	863	1008	−145	16	Eliminated	64–77	46–70	71–75	59–65	54–64	77–68	82–90	—

Source: FIBA.com

== Quarter-finals ==
In the quarter-finals, teams playing against each other had to win two games to win the series. Thus, if one team win two games, before all three games have been played, the game that remain is omitted.

Team 1	Agg.	Team 2	1st leg	2nd leg	3rd leg
Dynamo Kursk (Russia)	2–0	(France) Tango Bourges Basket	76–71	104–92	–
Fenerbahçe (Turkey)	2–1	(Spain) Perfumerías Avenida	78–68	66–76	87–80
UMMC Ekaterinburg (Russia)	2–0	(Italy) Famila Schio	92–47	102–67	–
Nadezhda Orenburg (Russia)	1–2	(Czech Republic) ZVVZ USK Praha	80–57	55–64	57–70

== Final four ==
Host Final Four – Yekaterinburg, Russia.

Semifinals; April 14
(Russia) Dynamo Kursk	87
(Czech Republic) ZVVZ USK Praha	80
(Turkey) Fenerbahçe	70
(Russia) UMMC Ekaterinburg	61

Final; April 16
(Russia) Dynamo Kursk	77
(Turkey) Fenerbahçe	63
Third place
(Czech Republic) ZVVZ USK Praha	63
(Russia) UMMC Ekaterinburg	68

All times are local (UTC+5).

=== Semifinals ===
14 April 2017
19:00

Report

Fenerbahçe (Turkey)	70–61	(Russia) UMMC Ekaterinburg
Scoring by quarter: 10–14, 18–19, 21–13, 21–15
Pts: Lavender 21; Rebs: Parker 15; Asts: Vardarlı 7		Pts: Taurasi 26; Rebs: Griner 7 Asts: four players 2

DIVS Sport Hall, Yekaterinburg
Attendance: 5,000
Referees:
Jasmina Juras (SRB)
Michele Rossi (ITA)
Marko Vučković (SLO)

14 April 2017
21:30

Report

Dynamo Kursk (Russia)	87–80 (OT)	(Czech Republic) ZVVZ USK Praha
Scoring by quarter: 24–26, 22–18, 14–17, 17–16, Overtime: 10–3
Pts: McCoughtry 28; Rebs: Vidmer 11; Asts: McCoughtry 5		Pts: Dupree 39; Rebs: Dupree 13; Asts: Palau 13

DIVS Sport Hall, Yekaterinburg
Attendance: 2,500
Referees:
Fabiana Martinescu-Badalan (ROM)
Janusz Calik (POL)
Artūras Šukys (LTU)

=== Third place game ===
16 April 2017
16:30

Report

ZVVZ USK Praha (Czech Republic)	63–68	(Russia) UMMC Ekaterinburg
Scoring by quarter: 17–18, 20–14, 14–18, 12–18
Pts: Petrović 19; Rebs: three players 7 Asts: Palau 8		Pts: Toliver 18; Rebs: Meesseman 12; Asts: Barič 5

DIVS Sport Hall, Yekaterinburg
Attendance: 3,500
Referees:
Michele Rossi (ITA)
Artūras Šukys (LTU)
Vasiliki Tsaroucha (GRE)

=== Final ===
16 April 2017
19:00

Report

Dynamo Kursk (Russia)	77–63	(Turkey) Fenerbahçe
Scoring by quarter: 17–18, 27–16, 18–21, 15–8
Pts: McCoughtry 20; Rebs: Ogwumike 10; Asts: Prince 7		Pts: Quigley 19; Rebs: Lavender 9 Asts: Quigley 3

DIVS Sport Hall, Yekaterinburg
Attendance: 3,500
Referees:
Jasmina Juras (SRB)
Fabiana Martinescu-Badalan (ROM)
Marko Vučković (SLO)

2016–17 EuroLeague Women Champions

Dynamo Kursk
First title

== Statistical leaders ==
=== Points ===
Rk	Name	Team	Games	Points	PPG
1	(United States) Yvonne Turner	(Hungary) Uniqa Sopron	13	244	18.8
2	(United States) Diana Taurasi	(Russia) UMMC Ekaterinburg	15	269	17.9
3	(United States) Angel McCoughtry	(Russia) Dynamo Kursk	18	311	17.3
4	(Serbia) Sonja Petrović	(Czech Republic) ZVVZ USK Praha	19	314	16.5
5	(Lithuania) Gintarė Petronytė	(Turkey) Mersin BŞB	14	226	16.1

=== Rebounds ===
Rk	Name	Team	Games	Rebounds	RPG
1	(United States) Nneka Ogwumike	(Russia) Dynamo Kursk	17	174	10.2
2	(Sweden) Amanda Zahui	(Russia) Nadezhda Orenburg	16	149	9.3
3	(Croatia) Marija Režan	(Poland) CCC Polkowice	14	118	8.4
4	(Brazil) Clarissa dos Santos	(France) Tango Bourges Basket	13	107	8.2
5	(United States) Elizabeth Williams	(Russia) Nadezhda Orenburg	17	134	7.9

=== Assists ===
Rk	Name	Team	Games	Assists	APG
1	(Spain) Laia Palau	(Czech Republic) ZVVZ USK Praha	19	149	7.8
2	(Turkey) Nilay Kartaltepe	(Turkey) Mersin BŞB	14	82	5.9
3	(Turkey) Birsel Vardarlı	(Turkey) Fenerbahçe	19	111	5.8
4	(Serbia) Miljana Bojović	(France) Tango Bourges Basket	16	90	5.6
5	(Spain) Anna Cruz	(Russia) Dynamo Kursk	17	94	5.5

== See also ==
- 2016–17 EuroCup Women
