= 2013–14 Turkish Women's Basketball League =

- League: Turkish Women's Basketball League
- Sport: Basketball
- Games: 182 (Regular Season)
- Teams: 14

Regular Season
- Season champions: Galatasaray Odeabank

TKBL Finals
- Champions: Galatasaray Odeabank
- Runners-up: Fenerbahçe

TKBL seasons
- ← 2012–13 2014–15 →

The 2013–14 Turkish Women's Basketball League is the 34th edition of the top-flight professional women's basketball league in Turkey.

Fenerbahçe are the defending champions.

== Regular season ==
=== League table ===
Pos	Team	Pld	W	L	PF	PA	PD	Pts	Qualification or relegation
1	Galatasaray Odeabank	26	24	2	1927	1459	+468	50	Qualified for the Playoffs
2	Fenerbahçe	26	23	3	1986	1604	+382	49	Qualified for the Playoffs
3	Kayseri Kaski	26	19	7	1902	1772	+130	45	Qualified for the Playoffs
4	İstanbul Üniversitesi B.G.D.	26	18	8	1833	1682	+151	44	Qualified for the Playoffs
5	Botaş	26	15	11	1772	1760	+12	41	Qualified for the Playoffs
6	Mersin BŞB	26	13	13	1731	1704	+27	39	Qualified for the Playoffs
7	Beşiktaş	26	11	15	1673	1731	−58	37	Qualified for the Playoffs
8	Orduspor	26	11	15	1817	1938	−121	37	Qualified for the Playoffs
9	Homend Antakya	26	10	16	1734	1908	−174	36	
10	Canik Belediye	26	10	16	1777	1911	−134	36	
11	Tarsus Belediye	26	9	17	1821	1866	−45	35	
12	Konak Belediye	26	8	18	1619	1773	−154	34	
13	Ceyhan Belediyespor	26	8	18	1742	1830	−88	34	Relegation to TKB2L
14	TED Ankara Kolejliler	26	3	23	1662	1958	−296	29	Relegation to TKB2L

Source: Turkish Women Basketball League

== Play-off ==
Quarterfinals
1	Galatasaray Odeabank	2
8	Orduspor	0
4	İstanbul Üniversitesi B.G.D.	1
5	Botaş	2
2	Fenerbahçe	2
7	Beşiktaş	0
3	Kayseri Kaski	2
6	Mersin Bş.Bld.	0

Semifinals
1	Galatasaray Odeabank	3
5	Botaş	0
2	Fenerbahçe	3
3	Kayseri Kaski	0

Finals
1	Galatasaray Medical Park	3
2	Fenerbahçe	2

Source: Turkish Women Basketball League
