= 2015–16 Nemzeti Bajnokság I/A (women's basketball) =

NB I/A
- Duration: October 1, 2015 - March 1, 2016 (regular season)
- Teams: 10
- TV partner(s): M4 Sport

The 2014–15 Nemzeti Bajnokság I/A was the 79th season of the Nemzeti Bajnokság I/A, the highest tier professional basketball league in Hungary.

== Teams ==
Location of teams in 2015-16 Nemzeti Bajnokság I/A

The following 10 clubs competed in the NB I/A during the 2015–16 season:

Team	Position 2014-15	City	Arena	Capacity
ELTE-BEAC	1st (NB I/B)	Budapest	Gabányi László Sportcsarnok	400
Ceglédi EKK	7th	Cegléd	Gál János Sportcsarnok	1,200
Diósgyőri VTK	Runner-up	Miskolc	Generali Aréna	1,688
UNI Győr	Third place	Győr	Egyetemi Csarnok	2,036
PEAC-Pécs	4th	Pécs	Lauber Dezső Sportcsarnok	2,791
PINKK Pécsi 424	5th	Komló	Komlói Sportközpont	800
UNIQA Sopron	Champion	Sopron	NOVOMATIC Aréna	2,500
KSC Szekszárd	8th	Szekszárd	Városi Sportcsarnok	1,100
Vasas Akadémia	9th	Budapest	Pasaréti Sportcentrum	300
Zalaegerszegi TE	6th	Zalaegerszeg	Városi Sportcsarnok	2,000

=== Personnel and kits ===
Team	Head coach	Team captain	Kit manufacturer	Shirt sponsor
ELTE-BEAC	(Hungary) Judit Balogh		Toti Sport	
Ceglédi EKK	(Hungary) László Cziczás			VBW Hungary Kft.
Diósgyőri VTK	(Spain) Maikel López		Toti Sport	
UNI Győr	(Hungary) Péter Völgyi		Erreà	CMB Cargo
PEAC-Pécs	(Spain) Roberto Hernández		Spalding	Pannonpower, Terra 21
PINKK Pécsi 424	(Italy) Sandro Orlando		Toti Sport	
UNIQA Sopron	(Hungary) László Sterbenz		Toti Sport	UNIQA
KSC Szekszárd	(Hungary) Gergely Magyar		Toti Sport	Tolle
Vasas Akadémia	(Hungary) Gábor Halmai		Toti Sport	MKB Euroleasing
Zalaegerszeg	(Hungary) Tamás Gáll		RECOP	Honda

== Regular season (Alapszakasz) ==
Pos	Team	Pld	W	L	PF	PA	PD	Pts	Qualification
1	UNIQA Sopron	18	16	2	1540	1147	+393	34	Playoffs
2	Aluinvent DVTK Miskolc	18	13	5	1433	1139	+294	31	Playoffs
3	CMB CARGO UNI GYŐR	18	13	5	1334	1195	+139	31	Playoffs
4	PINKK-Pécsi 424	18	12	6	1384	1226	+158	30	Playoffs
5	PEAC-Pécs	18	12	6	1245	1130	+115	30	Playoffs
6	Ceglédi EKK	18	10	8	1295	1227	+68	28	Playoffs
7	Atomerőmű KSC Szekszárd	18	8	10	1190	1208	−18	26	Playoffs
8	ZTE Női Kosárlabda Klub	18	3	15	1137	1298	−161	21	Playoffs
9	ELTE-BEAC Újbuda	18	2	16	926	1416	−490	20	Play-out
10	Vasas Akadémia	18	1	17	1001	1499	−498	19	Play-out

Updated to match(es) played on 1 November 2015. Source: Kosarsport.hu
Rules for classification: 1) Points; 2) Goal difference; 3) Goals scored.

=== Results ===
Home \ Away	BEAC	CEKK	DVTK	GYŐR	PEAC	PINK	SOP	SZE	VAS	ZTE
ELTE-BEAC Újbuda										
Ceglédi EKK										
DVTK Miskolc										
UNI Győr										
PEAC-Pécs										
PINKK-Pécsi 424										
UNIQA Sopron										
KSC Szekszárd										
Vasas Akadémia										
Zalaegerszegi TE										

Legend: Blue = home team win; Yellow = draw; Red = away team win.

== Playoffs ==
Teams in bold won the playoff series. Numbers to the left of each team indicate the team's original playoff seeding. Numbers to the right indicate the score of each playoff game.

Quarterfinals
1	**UNIQA Sopron**	**87**	**79**
8	ZTE Női Kosárlabda Klub	44	61
4	**PINKK-Pécsi 424**	**62**	64	**58**
5	PEAC-Pécs	60	**73**	50
2	**Aluinvent DVTK Miskolc**	**63**	61	**76**
7	Atomerőmű KSC Szekszárd	57	**62**	68
3	**CMB CARGO UNI GYŐR**	**70**	63	**86**
6	Ceglédi EKK	60	**72**	76

Semifinals
1	**UNIQA Sopron**	**77**	**67**
4	PINKK-Pécsi 424	39	47
2	Aluinvent DVTK Miskolc	**83**	67	53
3	**CMB CARGO UNI GYŐR**	73	**68**	**65**

Finals
1	**UNIQA Sopron**	**77**	**83**	**81**
3	CMB CARGO UNI GYŐR	45	67	60
Third place
2	Aluinvent DVTK Miskolc	**66**	55	59
4	**PINKK-Pécsi 424**	53	**62**	**67**

=== Finals ===
In the finals, teams play against each other which must win three games to win the title. Thus, if one team win three games before all five games have been played, the remaining games are omitted. The team that finished in the higher Regular season place will be played the first, the third and the fifth (if it is necessary) game of the series at home.

Team 1	Agg.	Team 2	Game 1	Game 2	Game 3	Game 4	Game 5
**UNIQA Sopron**	3–0	CMB CARGO UNI GYŐR	77–45	83–67	81–60	—	—

==== Game 1 ====
19 April 2016	**UNIQA Sopron**	**77**–45	CMB CARGO UNI GYŐR	Sopron
17:30 (CEST)	Scoring by quarter: **24**–12, **18**–7, **15**–14, **20**–12
	Pts: D. Peters 19; Rebs: D. Peters 13; Asts: 9 PIR: D. Peters 29	Report	Pts: C. Goree 13; Rebs: C. Goree 7 Asts: 8 PIR: C. Goree 17	Arena: NOVOMATIC Aréna; Attendance: 1,200; Referees: Tamás Benczur, Tamás Söjtöry, László Minár

==== Game 2 ====
22 April 2016	CMB CARGO UNI GYŐR	67–**83**	**UNIQA Sopron**	Győr
18:00 (CEST)	Scoring by quarter: 22–**23**, 12–**17**, 18–**24**, 15–**19**
	Pts: C. Goree 23; Rebs: M. Grigalauskytė 5 Asts: 6 PIR: C. Goree 24	Report	Pts: D. Peters 21; Rebs: D. Peters 7 Asts: 5 PIR: D. Peters 31	Arena: Egyetemi Csarnok; Attendance: 800; Referees: Tamás Földházi, Csaba Cziffra, Péter Frányó

==== Game 3 ====
25 April 2016	**UNIQA Sopron**	**81**–60	CMB CARGO UNI GYŐR	Sopron
17:00 (CEST)	Scoring by quarter: **22**–15, **23**–16, **18**–11, 18–18
	Pts: I. Ciglar 18; Rebs: S. Krnjić 6 Asts: 7 PIR: A. Crvendakić 31	Report	Pts: C. Goree 20; Rebs: M. Grigalauskytė 12; Asts: 8 PIR: C. Goree 21	Arena: NOVOMATIC Aréna; Attendance: 1,450; Referees: Péter Papp, Gellért Kapitány, Tibor Hegedüs

UNIQA Sopron won the FINAL series 3–0.

2015–16 NB I/A
Winner
**Szolnoki Olaj**
**7th title**

6 Ákos Keller, 8 Krisztián Wittmann, 9 Dávid Vojvoda (c), 10 Péter Kovács, 11 Goran Vrbanc, 12 Gergely Somogyi, 15 Miloš Borisov, 18 Balázs Peringer, 21 Jarrod Jones, 22 Péter Zsíros, 24 Strahinja Milošević, 32 Gábor Kovács, 33 Dino Gregory, Gábor Rudner
Head coach: Stojan Ivković

== Play-out ==
9th placed team hosted Games 1, plus Game 3 if necessary. 10th placed team hosted Game 2.

9th placed team	Agg.	10th placed team	1st leg	2nd leg	3rd leg
ELTE-BEAC Újbuda	2–1	Vasas Akadémia	78–60	56–64	74–64

== Hungarian clubs in European competitions ==
=== EuroLeague Women ===
- UNIQA Sopron

Round	Club	Home	Away	Aggregate
Regular Season (Group A)	(Turkey) Fenerbahçe	52-69	69-86	8th
Regular Season (Group A)	(Turkey) Galatasaray	60-76	56-81	8th
Regular Season (Group A)	(Russia) Dynamo Kursk	68-102	63-98	8th
Regular Season (Group A)	(Slovakia) Good Angels Košice	70-86	53-81	8th
Regular Season (Group A)	(Italy) Famila Schio	65-75	61-97	8th
Regular Season (Group A)	(France) Villeneuve-d'Ascq	50-69	44-78	8th
Regular Season (Group A)	(Spain) Perfumerías Avenida	73-67	60-74	8th

=== EuroCup Women ===
- Aluinvent DVTK

Round	Club	Home	Away	Aggregate
Regular Season (Group G)	(Netherlands) Orange Blizzards	79-57	84-74	1st
Regular Season (Group G)	(Czech Republic) Valosun KP Brno	83-58	77-73	1st
Regular Season (Group G)	(Italy) DIKE Napoli	68-64	60-53	1st
Round of 16	(Sweden) Luleå BBK	90-72	86-62	176–134
Round of 8	(Czech Republic) Basketball Nymburk	77-50	69-64	146–114
Quarter-finals	(France) Basket Landes	58-57	65-89	123–146

- PEAC-Pécs

Round	Club	Home	Away	Aggregate
Regular Season (Group F)	(France) Basket Landes	68-82	79-62	3rd
Regular Season (Group F)	(Czech Republic) Basketball Nymburk	84-43	68-82	3rd
Regular Season (Group F)	(Switzerland) Elfic Fribourg	65-64	68-82	3rd

- UNI GYŐR

Round	Club	Home	Away	Aggregate
Regular Season (Group H)	(Belgium) Belfius Namur Capitale	62-74	74-80	4th
Regular Season (Group H)	(France) Union Angers	53-70	51-69	4th
Regular Season (Group H)	(Portugal) Spoortiva Azores Airlines	67-76	49-72	4th

- PINKK-Pécsi 424

Round	Club	Home	Away	Aggregate
Regular Season (Group E)	(France) Nantes Rezé Basket	64-56	57-88	4th
Regular Season (Group E)	(Germany) TSV 1880 Wasserburg	55-70	55-72	4th
Regular Season (Group E)	(Italy) Umana Reyer Venezia	61-74	49-62	4th
