= Elena Volkova (basketball) =

Russian basketball player

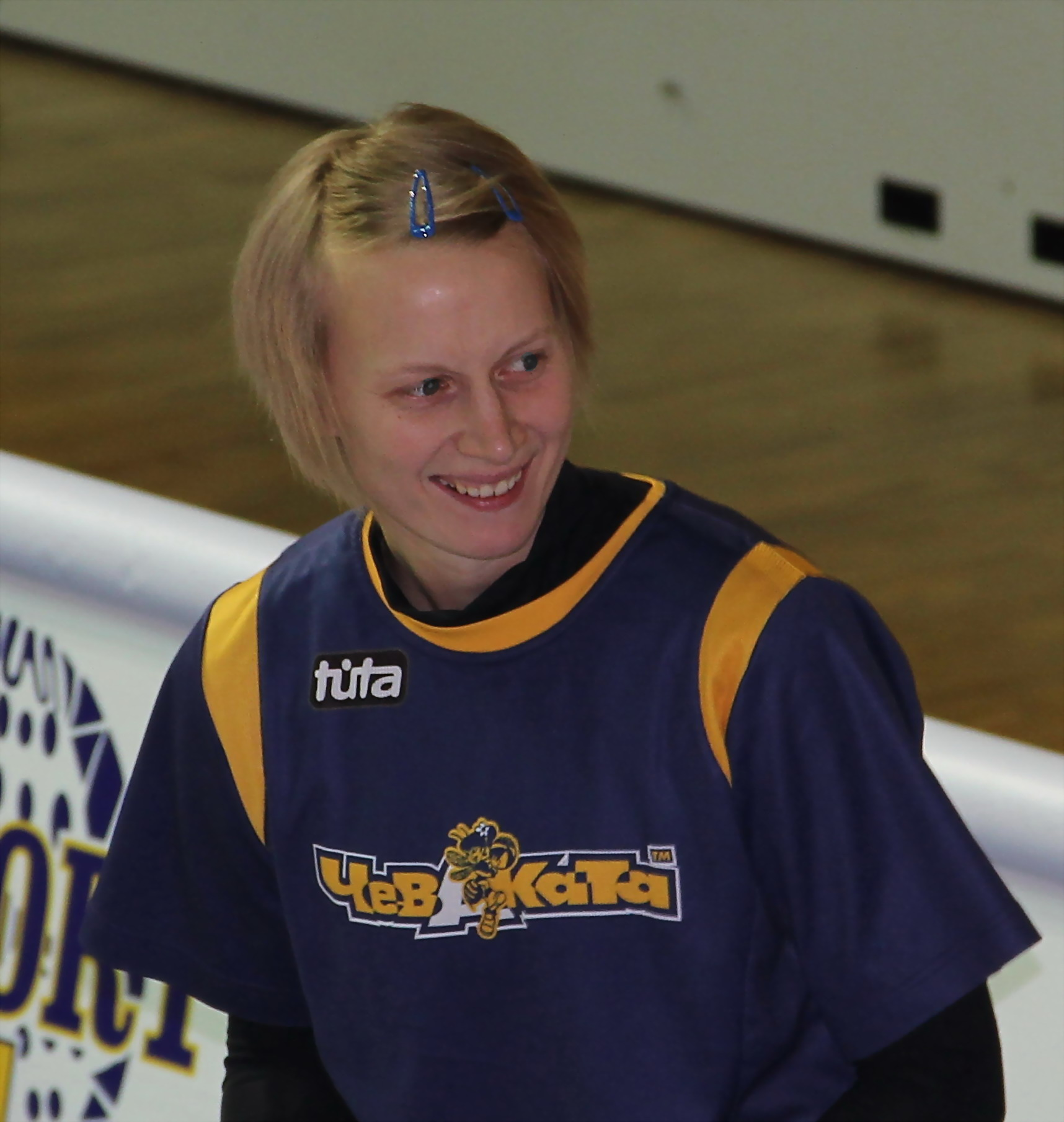
- Volkova in 2012

Personal information
- Born: 9 April 1983 (age 43) Vologda, Russia
- Height: 176 cm (5 ft 9 in)
- Weight: 65 kg (143 lb)

Sport
- Sport: Basketball
- Club: Chevakata Vologda (1998–2009); UMMC Ekaterinburg (2009–10); Chevakata Vologda (2010–13); Dynamo Kursk (2013–14); Nadezhda Orenburg (2014–15); Chevakata Vologda (2015–2016)
Medal record
Representing Russia
European Championships
| Silver medal – second place | 2009 Latvia | Team |

Elena Veniaminovna Volkova (Russian: Елена Вениаминовна Волкова, born 9 April 1983) is a Russian basketball shooting guard. She was part of the Russian national team that won the silver medal at the 2009 European Championships. Her club Dynamo Kursk also placed second at the 2013–14 EuroCup.
