= 2015–16 Women's Basketball Super League =

- League: Women's Basketball Super League
- Sport: Basketball
- Games: 182 (Regular Season)
- Teams: 14

Regular Season
- Season champions: Fenerbahçe

TKBL Finals
- Champions: Fenerbahçe (12th title)
- Runners-up: Hatay BŞB

TKBL seasons
- ← 2014–15 2016–17 →

The 2015–16 Women's Basketball Super League is the 36th edition of the top-flight professional women's basketball league in Turkey.

== League Champions ==
Fenerbahçe are the champions, beating Hatay BŞB in the play-off finals, by 3–0.

== Regular season ==
=== League table ===
Pos	Team	Pld	W	L	PF	PA	PD	Pts	Qualification or relegation
1	Fenerbahçe	26	23	3	2038	1624	+414	49	Qualified for the Playoffs
2	Hatay BŞB	26	20	6	1983	1824	+159	46	Qualified for the Playoffs
3	Mersin BŞB	26	18	8	1980	1807	+173	44	Qualified for the Playoffs
4	Abdullah Gül Üniversitesi	26	17	9	1900	1856	+44	43	Qualified for the Playoffs
5	Galatasaray	26	18	8	1942	1654	+288	43 (Note: 1 point deducted?)	Qualified for the Playoffs
6	İstanbul Üniversitesi	26	12	14	1802	1888	−86	38	Qualified for the Playoffs
7	Canik Belediye	26	12	14	1911	1914	−3	38	Qualified for the Playoffs
8	İstanbul BGD	26	11	15	1884	1902	−18	37	Qualified for the Playoffs
9	Beşiktaş	26	10	16	1850	1996	−146	36	
10	Yakın Doğu Üniversitesi	26	10	16	1890	1987	−97	36	
11	Botaş	26	10	16	1901	1917	−16	36	
12	Adana ASKİ	26	9	17	1881	1993	−112	35	
13	Edirne Belediyesi Edirnespor	26	8	18	1870	1928	−58	34	Relegation to TKB2L
14	Orduspor	26	4	22	1841	2383	−542	30	Relegation to TKB2L

Updated to match(es) played on 6 April 2016. Source: Women's Basketball Super League

=== Results ===
Home \ Away	AGÜ	ADA	BEŞ	BOT	CAN	EDİ	FEN	GAL	HAT	BGD	İÜN	MER	ORD	YDÜ
Abdullah Gül Üniversitesi	—	83–68	65–71	58–77	69–56	85–77	70–68	72–70	52–56	74–80	81–72	76–73	88–70	80–74
Adana ASKİ	84–74	—	81–78	75–72	69–76	60–55	69–93	68–82	81–87	70–87	81–71	65–75	92–84	61–62
Beşiktaş	68–73	83–77	—	84–80	69–79	81–76	71–78	61–97	84–77	71–73	76–62	69–84	63–87	90–62
Botaş	83–81	85–75	69–70	—	72–78	67–88	65–75	73–70	58–66	70–63	52–65	68–86	72–64	67–76
Canik Belediye	69–79	69–61	74–65	81–73	—	87–84	77–72	70–73	63–82	75–59	69–77	72–77	122–50	79–76
Edirne Belediyesi Edirnespor	65–70	76–64	77–70	67–76	69–55	—	71–86	64–69	78–80	90–83	66–73	63–72	72–75	79–72
Fenerbahçe	96–61	76–66	68–74	83–59	88–57	81–60	—	75–62	60–53	92–48	70–49	71–67	113–69	78–69
Galatasaray	58–78	78–69	92–50	83–73	78–57	82–55	0–20	—	60–67	74–54	92–44	76–67	106–59	85–74
Hatay BŞB	78–61	71–59	79–82	75–59	82–78	78–66	72–74	75–70	—	78–72	87–59	70–67	84–77	99–104
İstanbul BGD	62–66	87–72	80–52	70–71	71–59	88–76	67–75	53–82	69–87	—	84–58	77–88	80–69	72–62
İstanbul Üniversitesi	64–77	80–63	66–60	96–60	75–63	84–57	48–94	67–74	75–61	71–68	—	76–82	78–68	70–71
Mersin BŞB	77–58	47–67	76–68	81–69	83–72	74–66	74–79	68–66	72–77	79–73	78–73	—	120–59	74–66
Orduspor	66–88	77–89	87–78	48–155	76–93	72–106	77–100	71–79	80–84	59–86	80–87	58–82	—	94–80
Yakın Doğu Üniversitesi	74–81	85–95	77–62	59–76	85–81	44–67	69–73	70–84	64–78	82–78	74–62	73–57	86–65	—

Updated to match(es) played on 6 April 2016. Source: TWBL Fixtures
Legend: Blue = home team win; Red = away team win.

== Play-off ==
Quarterfinals
1	Fenerbahçe	78	66	X
8	İstanbul BGD	70	52	X
4	Abdullah Gül Üniversitesi	67	40	84
5	Galatasaray	55	56	79
2	Hatay BŞB	78	57	X
7	Canik Belediye	64	53	X
3	Mersin BŞB	78	77	X
6	İstanbul Üniversitesi	72	74	X

Semifinals
1	Fenerbahçe	82	76	62	72	X
4	Abdullah Gül Üniversitesi	77	58	75	62	X
2	Hatay BŞB	80	68	57	85	X
3	Mersin BŞB	85	67	55	78	X

Finals
1	Fenerbahçe	75	64	68	X	X
2	Hatay BŞB	73	59	66	X	X
