= 2014–15 Turkish Women's Basketball League =

- League: Turkish Women's Basketball League
- Sport: Basketball
- Games: 182 (Regular Season)
- Teams: 14

Regular Season
- Season champions: Galatasaray OdeaBank

TKBL Finals
- Champions: Galatasaray OdeaBank
- Runners-up: Abdullah Gül Üniversitesi

TKBL seasons
- ← 2013–14 2015–16 →

The 2014–15 Turkish Women's Basketball League was the 35th edition of the top-flight professional women's basketball league in Turkey.

Galatasaray OdeaBank were the champions of the season after beating Abdullah Gül Üniversitesi in the playoffs final by 3–1.

== Regular season ==
=== League table ===
Pos	Team	Pld	W	L	PF	PA	PD	Pts	Qualification or relegation
1	Galatasaray OdeaBank	26	23	3	1918	1410	+508	49	Qualified for the Playoffs
2	Abdullah Gül Üniversitesi	26	22	4	1952	1725	+227	48	Qualified for the Playoffs
3	Fenerbahçe	26	20	6	2008	1661	+347	46	Qualified for the Playoffs
4	İstanbul Üniversitesi B.G.D.	26	17	9	1921	1818	+103	43	Qualified for the Playoffs
5	Adana ASKİ	26	16	10	1901	1847	+54	42	Qualified for the Playoffs
6	Beşiktaş	26	14	12	1914	1922	−8	40	Qualified for the Playoffs
7	Orduspor	26	12	14	1890	1861	+29	38	Qualified for the Playoffs
8	Edirne Belediyesi Edirnespor	26	12	14	1725	1845	−120	38	Qualified for the Playoffs
9	Botaş	26	12	14	1757	1832	−75	38	
10	Canik Belediye	26	9	17	1768	1954	−186	35	
11	Mersin BŞB	26	8	18	1762	1891	−129	34	
12	Hatay BŞB	26	7	19	1692	1869	−177	33	
13	Orman Gençlik	26	5	21	1874	2170	−296	31	Relegation to TKB2L
14	Osmaniye Gençlik	26	5	21	1686	1963	−277	31	Relegation to TKB2L

Source: Turkish Women Basketball League

== Play-off ==
Quarterfinals
1	Galatasaray OdeaBank	2
8	Edirne Belediyesi Edirnespor	0
4	İstanbul Üniversitesi B.G.D.	0
5	Adana ASKİ	2
2	Abdullah Gül Üniversitesi	2
7	Orduspor	1
3	Fenerbahçe	2
6	Beşiktaş	0

Semifinals
1	Galatasaray OdeaBank	3
5	Adana ASKİ	0
2	Abdullah Gül Üniversitesi	3
3	Fenerbahçe	0

Finals
1	Galatasaray OdeaBank	3
2	Abdullah Gül Üniversitesi	1

Source: Turkish Women Basketball League

== Individual statistics ==
=== Points ===
Rank	Name	Team	Games	Points	PPG
1.	(Sweden) Frida Eldebrink	Beşiktaş	8	154	19.25
2.	(United States) Angel McCoughtry	Fenerbahçe	8	148	18.50
3.	(United States) Lindsey Harding	Edirne Belediyesi Edirnespor	10	178	17.80

=== Rebounds ===
Rank	Name	Team	Games	Rebounds	RPG
1.	(United States) Courtney Paris	İstanbul Üniversitesi B.G.D.	10	129	12.90
2.	(United States) Lauren Ervin	Botaş	9	96	10.67
3.	(United States) Erlana Larkins	Adana ASKİ	10	102	10.20

=== Assists ===
Rank	Name	Team	Games	Assists	APG
1.	(United States) Natasha Lacy	Mersin BŞB	9	70	7.78
2.	(Turkey) Nilay Kartaltepe	Adana ASKİ	10	57	5.70
3.	(United States) Tanisha Wright	Abdullah Gül Üniversitesi	10	56	5.60

=== Blocks ===
Rank	Name	Team	Games	Blocks	BPG
1.	(Croatia) Luca Ivanković	Edirne Belediyesi Edirnespor	10	24	2.40
2.	(United States) Kara Braxton	Orman Gençlik	10	12	1.20
3.	(United States) / (Turkey) Kristen Newlin	İstanbul Üniversitesi B.G.D.	8	9	1.13

=== Steals ===
Rank	Name	Team	Games	Steals	SPG
1.	(United States) Angel McCoughtry	Fenerbahçe	8	21	2.63
2.	(Serbia) Ana Dabović	Orman Gençlik	10	24	2.40
3.	(United States) Tan White	Orduspor	10	23	2.30
