= Simay Karaman =

Turkish basketball player

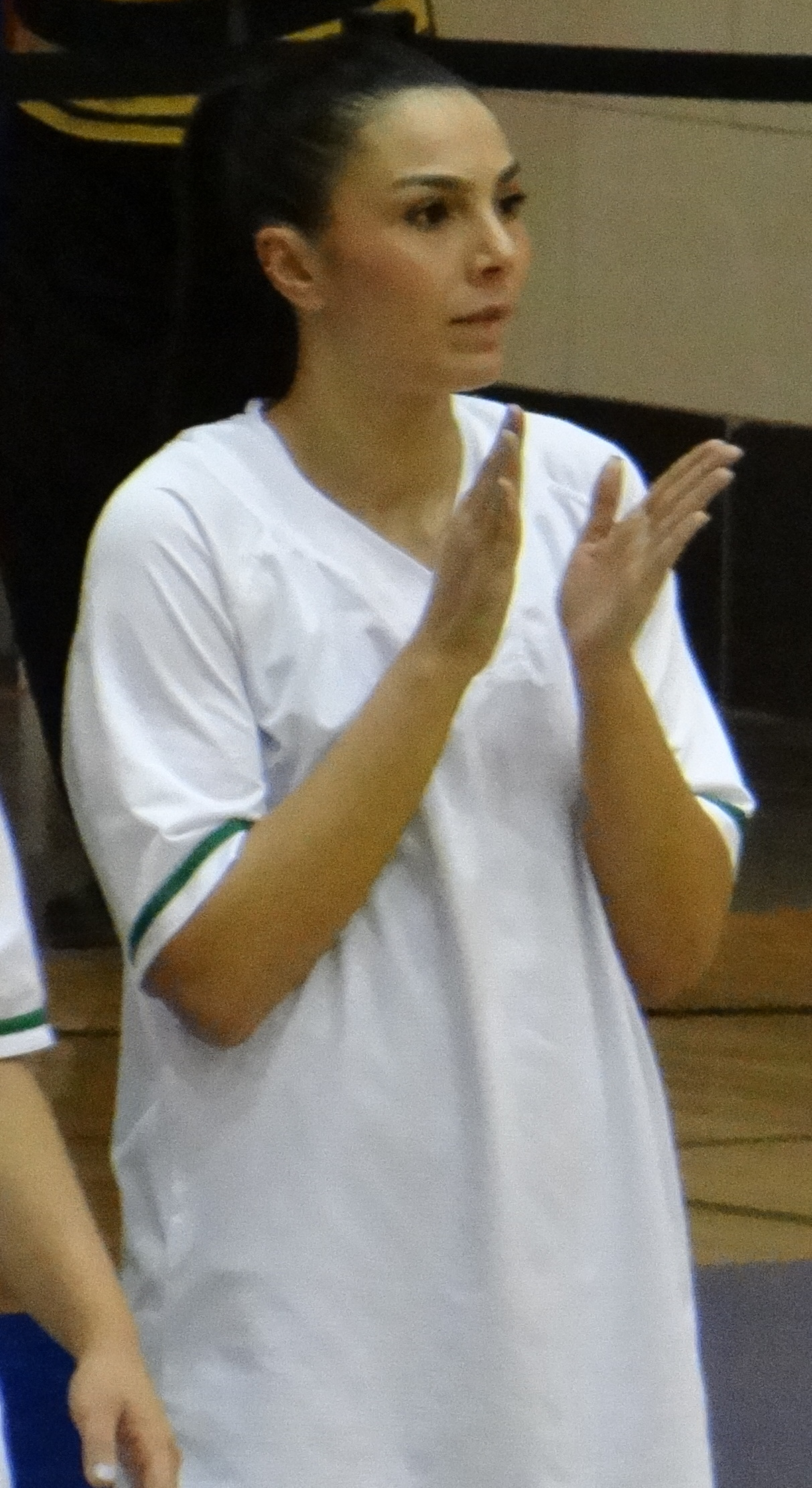
- Simay Karaman (October 2017)

Personal information
- Born: 11 March 1991 (age 35) Bakırköy, Istanbul, Turkey
- Listed height: 1.82 m (6 ft 0 in)
- Listed weight: 72 kg (159 lb)
- Position: Forward

Career history
- 2011–2013: Orduspor
- 2013–2015: BGD
- 2015–2016: Yakın Doğu Üniversitesi
- 2016–2017: Girne American University

Safiye Simay Karaman (born 11 March 1991) is a Turkish professional basketball player. She was a member of the Turkey women's national basketball team.

== Private life ==
Safiye Simay Karaman was born in Bakırköy district of Istanbul Province, Turkey on 11 March 1991.

On 5 June 2017, she got engaged with Göksenin Köksal, captain of the Galatasaray men's basketball team. After eight years of togetherness, the couple married on 7 July 2018. On 26 March 2020, she gave birth to a son named Ayaz.

== Club ==
Karaman began playing basketball in Galatasaray at the age of seven. She then played in youth, juniors and women's teams of İstanbul Üniversitesi SK. From 2011 to 2013, she played three seasons for Orduspor in the Turkish Women's Basketball Second League (TKB2L), and capped 81 times. She was coached by Alper Durur for more than ten years. In the 2014–15 season, she played for the Turkish Women's Basketball League's (TKBL) new team "Basketbolu Geliştirme Derneği" (BGD). She started the 2015-16 Women's Basketball Super League (TKBSL) season with the BGD team, transferred, however, by late November 2015 to the Yakın Doğu Üniversitesi of Northern Cyprus team, which play in the Turkish League. In the 2016–17 season, she also played for Northern Cyprus basketball team of Girne American University.

The 1.82 m (5 ft 11 1/2 in) tall sportswoman plays in the forward position.

== International ==
Simay was admitted to the Turkey women's national under-16 and under-17 basketball team, and took part in the 2007 FIBA Europe Under-16 Championship for Women in Valmiera, Latvia.

She was called up to the Turkey women's national basketball team, and played preparation matches for the EuroBasket Women 2017. She did not take part at the championship.

As of 2017, she had worn the Turkey national team's jersey 85 times.
