= BC Castors Braine =

Castors Braine
- Leagues: Belgian League; EuroLeague Women
- Founded: 1939; 86 years ago
- Arena: Salla André Renauld; Complexe Sportif Gaston Reiff
- Location: Braine-l'Alleud, Belgium
- Website: castorsbraine.be
Home	Away

BC Castors Braine (English: Basketball Club Braine Beavers) is a basketball club, with both men's and women's sections, based in the municipality of Braine-l'Alleud, Belgium. The women's team plays in the National First Division and won the title in 2014. The men's team plays in the provincial division.

== History ==
The club was founded in 1939.

The men's team participated in the Korać Cup in 1987–88, 1990–91 and 1996–97.

The women's team reached the national first division in 2011. In 2014, the female Castors Braine squad won the national championship and the national cup. They followed the title by being runners-up in the 2014–15 EuroCup Women, the first Belgian team to reach a European final. Castors Braine has since won the next four Belgian championships, winning the Belgian Cup as well in 2015 and 2017, with BC Namur-Capitale taking the title instead.

At the beginning of the 2015–2016 season, the Royal Castors Braine took the name of Mithra Castors Braine following the partnership with Mithra Pharmaceuticals, including the presentation of the team in the FIBA Europe site for Euroligue.

The 2019–20 season was finished prematurely because of the COVID-19 pandemic. Castors were named champions for the fifth straight time because the team was highest in the standings at the time.

== Current roster ==
BC Namur Capitale roster
Players
Coaches

Pos.	No.	Nat.	Name	Ht.	Wt.	Age
PG	2	(Slovenia)	Krošelj, Aleksandra	1.73 m (5 ft 8 in)		26 – 25 February 1999
PG	4	(Belgium)	Leblon, Emmeline	1.65 m (5 ft 5 in)		25 – 26 May 2000
PF	6	(Senegal) (Spain)	Sarr, Toch	1.88 m (6 ft 2 in)		41 – 25 January 1984
PG	7	(Croatia)	Tadić, Matea	1.76 m (5 ft 9 in)		25 – 25 October 1999
SG	8	(Serbia)	Bogićević, Nina	1.81 m (5 ft 11 in)		35 – 30 October 1989
SG	13	(Hungary)	Lelik, Réka	1.81 m (5 ft 11 in)		26 – 14 April 1999
PG	18	(France)	Fébrissy, Maëva	1.72 m (5 ft 8 in)		19 – 26 April 2006
C	19	(Ukraine)	Uro-Nile, Miriam	1.88 m (6 ft 2 in)		30 – 21 October 1994
PF	20	(Belgium)	Marblie, Lisa	1.79 m (5 ft 10 in)		20 – 21 January 2005
PF	21	(United States)	Lindstrom, Jessica	1.85 m (6 ft 1 in)		29 – 28 February 1996
PG	30	(Belgium)	Devos, Alice	1.60 m (5 ft 3 in)		20 – 19 February 2005
F	35	(Belgium)	Devos, Lore	1.85 m (6 ft 1 in)		26 – 14 April 1999
PG	40	(Belgium)	Robert, Nina	1.72 m (5 ft 8 in)		26 – 25 August 1999
C	44	(Canada)	Fogg, Abigail	1.93 m (6 ft 4 in)		31 – 31 March 1994

Head coach

- (France) Frédéric Dusart

Assistant coach(es)

- (Belgium) Gerrit Driessens

Legend

- (C) Team captain
- Injured

- Roster
Updated: 2022-12-08

== Honours ==
=== Women's ===
Belgian Women's Basketball League

- Champions (7): 2014, 2015, 2016, 2017, 2018, 2019, 2020, 2025

=== Men's ===
First National Division (tier 1)

- Runners-up (5): 1986–87, 1987–88, 1988–89, 1989–90, 1991–92
