= Orduspor (women's basketball) =

- Founded: 9 September 2011
- Arena: Vali Kemal Yazıcıoğlu Sport Hall
- Location: Ordu, Turkey
- Website: http://www.orduspor.org.tr
Home	Away

Orduspor Women's Basketball is the women basketball section of Orduspor, a major sports club in Ordu, Turkey.

== History ==
The team was founded in 2011 and first played in the TKBL. In 2013, it was promoted to the top-tier KBSL. In its three season in the KBSL, it made the playoffs twice before being relegated at the end of the 2015–16 season. On the continental stage, it competed in the EuroCup Women in 2014–15 and 2015–16.

In October 2017, the team folded after three games in the Turkish Women's Basketball League after all the players left the team and the head coach resigned due to its financial difficulties.

== Notable players ==
- (Canada) Miranda Ayim
- (Hungary) Tijana Krivačević
- (Montenegro) Iva Perovanović
- (Montenegro) Snežana Aleksić
- (Turkey) Melek Bilge
- (Turkey) Simay Karaman
- (Serbia) Jelena Milovanović
- (United States) Barbara Turner
- (United States) Marcedes Walker
- (United States) Tan White

== KSBL Season by season ==
Season	Tier	League	Pos.	W–L	Playoffs
2013–14	1	KSBL	8th	11–15	First-round
2014–15	1	KSBL	7th	12–14	First-round
2015–16	1	KSBL	14	4–22	DNQ
