= Marcedes Walker =

American-Azerbaijani basketball player (born 1986)

Personal information
- Born: October 17, 1986 (age 40) Philadelphia, Pennsylvania, U.S.
- Listed height: 6 ft 3 in (1.91 m)
- Listed weight: 253 lb (115 kg)

Career information
- High school: University City (Philadelphia, Pennsylvania)
- College: Pittsburgh (2004–2008)
- WNBA draft: 2008: undrafted
- Playing career: 2008–present
- Position: Center

Career history
- 2008: Houston Comets
- 2009–2011: Pallacanestro Pozzuoli
- 2011: Elitzur Netanya
- 2011–2012: Elitzur Holon
- 2012: Orduspor
- 2012: KK Row Rybnik
- 2012–2013: TED Ankara Kolejliler
- 2013–2014: Edirne Spor
- 2014–2015: Canik Belediyespor
- 2015–2017: Çankaya Üniversitesi
- 2017–2018: Osmaniye GSK
- 2018–2019: Aci Koleji
- Stats at Basketball Reference

Marcedes Marie Walker (born October 17, 1986) is an American-Azerbaijani basketball player who is a member of the Azerbaijan women's national 3x3 team. She played college basketball for the Pittsburgh Panthers and later played professionally in the Women's National Basketball Association (WNBA) for the Houston Comets.

== Early life ==
Walker was born on October 17, 1986, in Philadelphia, Pennsylvania. She attended University City High School in Philadelphia, where she was a standout three-sport athlete, competing in basketball, volleyball and track and field. For the basketball team, she served as a three-year team captain and led the team in scoring and rebounding all three of those years, being a three-time All-City selection. She averaged 21.9 points and 8.9 rebounds per game as a senior and was named an honorable mention McDonald's All-American.

== College career ==
Although Walker had a number of offers to play college basketball for powerhouse teams, she chose to commit to the Pittsburgh Panthers; Ron Cook of the Pittsburgh Post-Gazette noted that at the time, Pittsburgh "was a joke in women's basketball", but credited Walker with having "resurrected the program from the dead". She saw significant playing time as a freshman in 2004–05, starting 26 games before injury and averaging 13.3 points and 9.1 rebounds; she led Pittsburgh in scoring and was the Big East Conference leader in rebounding. She was named honorable mention All-Big East and to the All-Big East Rookie Team.

As a sophomore, Walker appeared in all 33 games and started 31, placing top 10 in the Big East Conference in scoring, rebounds and field-goal percentage. She led the Panthers in four categories: scoring (16.8), rebounds (9.1), steals (49) and blocks (36). A team captain, she was named first-team All-Big East at the end of the season. She then started 32 games in the 2006–07 season, being named first-team All-Big East and to the Kodak/WCA District I All-America team after helping Pittsburgh appear in the NCAA Tournament. As a senior, she was named an All-American and second-team All-Big East selection, leading Pittsburgh to their furthest-ever placement in the NCAA Tournament. As of 2024, she is Pittsburgh's all-time leading rebounder (1,162) and is sixth all-time in scoring (1,870).

== Professional career ==
After going unselected in the 2008 WNBA draft, Walker signed with the Houston Comets. She survived the roster cutdowns and made the opening-day roster. She appeared in two games, scoring no points, before being released on June 16, 2008.

After her brief stint in the WNBA, Walker played the rest of her career abroad. She played for Pallacanestro Pozzuoli in Italy from 2009 to 2011, then moved to Israel and played for Elitzur Netanya B.C. in 2011. She played for Elitzur Holon from 2011 to 2012 before moving to Turkey, joining Orduspor in 2012. She also played for KK Row Rybnik and TED Ankara Kolejliler in 2012, staying with the latter until 2013, when she left for Edirne Spor. She was named the most valuable player of the Turkish second division in 2014 and led her team to the league championship, being a first-team all-conference choice. She played for Canik Belediyespor from 2014 to 2015, Çankaya Üniversitesi from 2015 to 2017, and Osmaniye GSK from 2017 to 2018 before finishing her career with Aci Koleji from 2018 to 2019. In her last season, with Aci Koleji, she appeared in 25 games and averaged 14.0 points.

== 3x3 career ==
Walker, along with WNBA player Tiffany Hayes, became an Azerbaijani citizen in 2015, to compete for the Azerbaijan women's national 3x3 team at the 2015 European Games. She competed for the team at several tournaments in the following years and helped them qualify for the 2024 Summer Olympics; she was one of four players chosen to compete for the team at the Olympics.

On August 26, 2024, the press service of the Azerbaijan Basketball Federation announced that Marcedes Walker has ended her career.
