= Hatayspor (women's basketball) =

Turkish women's basketball team

- Leagues: Turkish Super League; EuroCup Women
- Founded: 2010
- History: Antakya Belediyespor (2010–2014); Hatay Büyükşehir Belediyespor (2014–2021)
- Arena: Antakya Sport Hall (capacity: 1,560)
- Location: Antakya, Hatay
- Team colors
- President: Nihat Tazeaslan
- Head coach: Ekin Baş
- Championships: 2 Presidential Cup: 2016, 2018

Hatayspor Women Basketball is the women basketball section of Hatayspor, a major sports club in Hatay, Turkey. The team was founded in 2010 and currently competing in the Turkish Super League and EuroCup Women.

== Previous names ==
- Antakya Belediyespor (2010–2014)
- Hatay Büyükşehir Belediyespor (2014–2021)
- Hatayspor (2021–present)

== Honours ==
=== International competitions ===
- EuroCup Women
  - Semifinals (1): 2016–17

=== National competitions ===
- Turkish Super League
  - Runners-up (1): 2015–16
- Turkish Cup
  - Runners-up (1): 2018
- Turkish President Cup
  - Champions (2): 2016, 2018

== Current roster ==
Hatayspor 2021–22 roster
Players
Coaches

Pos.	No.	Nat.	Name	Ht.	Wt.	Age
G	3	(United States)	Ellenberg-Wiley, Aaryn	1.70 m (5 ft 7 in)		33 – 19 July 1992
G	6	(Turkey)	Akbaş, Büşra	1.75 m (5 ft 9 in)		30 – 8 March 1995
F	8	(Turkey)	Akgün, Büşra	1.85 m (6 ft 1 in)		32 – 9 June 1993
F	9	(Turkey)	Çağlar Ökten, Bahar	1.91 m (6 ft 3 in)		36 – 28 September 1988
C	13	(Greece)	Louka, Vasiliki	1.92 m (6 ft 4 in)		29 – 5 July 1996
G	23	(United States)	Jones, Jazmine	1.83 m (6 ft 0 in)		28 – 15 October 1996
F	24	(Turkey)	Emirtekin, Elif	1.84 m (6 ft 0 in)		31 – 12 August 1994
F	29	(Turkey)	Lafatan, Dilara	1.88 m (6 ft 2 in)		33 – 7 November 1991

Head coach

- (Turkey) Ekin Baş

Assistant coach(es)

- (Turkey) İstemihan Örücü
- (Turkey) İbrahim Zafer Burhanlıoğlu
- (Turkey) Mesut Yılmaz

Legend

- (C) Team captain
- (DC) Dual citizenship
- Injured

- Roster
Updated: 2022

== Notable players ==
- (United States) Kalani Brown
- (United States) Alexis Prince

== League Performances ==
Season	League	Pos	Pld	W	L	PF	PA
2010–11	TKB2L	2	28	22	6	1990	1551
2011–12	TKBL	8	22	11	11	1571	1630
	TKBL Playoffs	Quarter Finalist	2	0	2	118	156
2012–13	EuroCup	Round of 16	6	3	3	419	409
	TKBL	7	26	14	12	1916	1725
	TKBL Playoffs	Quarter Finalist	2	0	2	113	134
	Spor Toto Turkish Cup	Quarter Finalist	4	2	2	275	270
2013–14	EuroCup	Group Stage	6	2	4	405	414
	TKBL	9	26	10	16	1734	1908
	Spor Toto Turkish Cup	Group Stage	3	1	2	220	247
2014–15	TKBL	12	26	7	19	1692	1869
	Spor Toto Turkish Cup	Group Stage	3	1	2	199	190
2015–16	TKBL	2	26	20	6	1983	1824
	TKBL Playoffs	Finalist	9	5	4	623	609
	Spor Toto Turkish Cup	Quarter Finalist	4	2	2	293	267
	Turkish President Cup	Champions	1	1	0	60	55
2016–17	EuroLeague Women – Group B	5	14	7	7	912	1005
	EuroCup Women	Semi Finalist	2	2	0	146	133
	TKBL	7	20	11	9	1390	1349
	Spor Toto Turkish Cup	Quarter Finalist	1	0	1	61	71
