= Dynamo Kursk =

- Leagues: Russian Premier League; ~~EuroLeague Women~~ (suspended)
- Founded: 1994; 32 years ago
- History: Svetlana Kursk (1994–1997); Dynamo Kursk (1997–present)
- Arena: Dynamo Arena; Kursk Technic State University
- Location: Kursk, Russia
- Team colors: White, Blue
- President: Alexander Yager
- Championships: 1 EuroLeague Women; 1 EuroCup Women; 4 Russian Cups
- Website: kurskbasket.ru
Home	Away

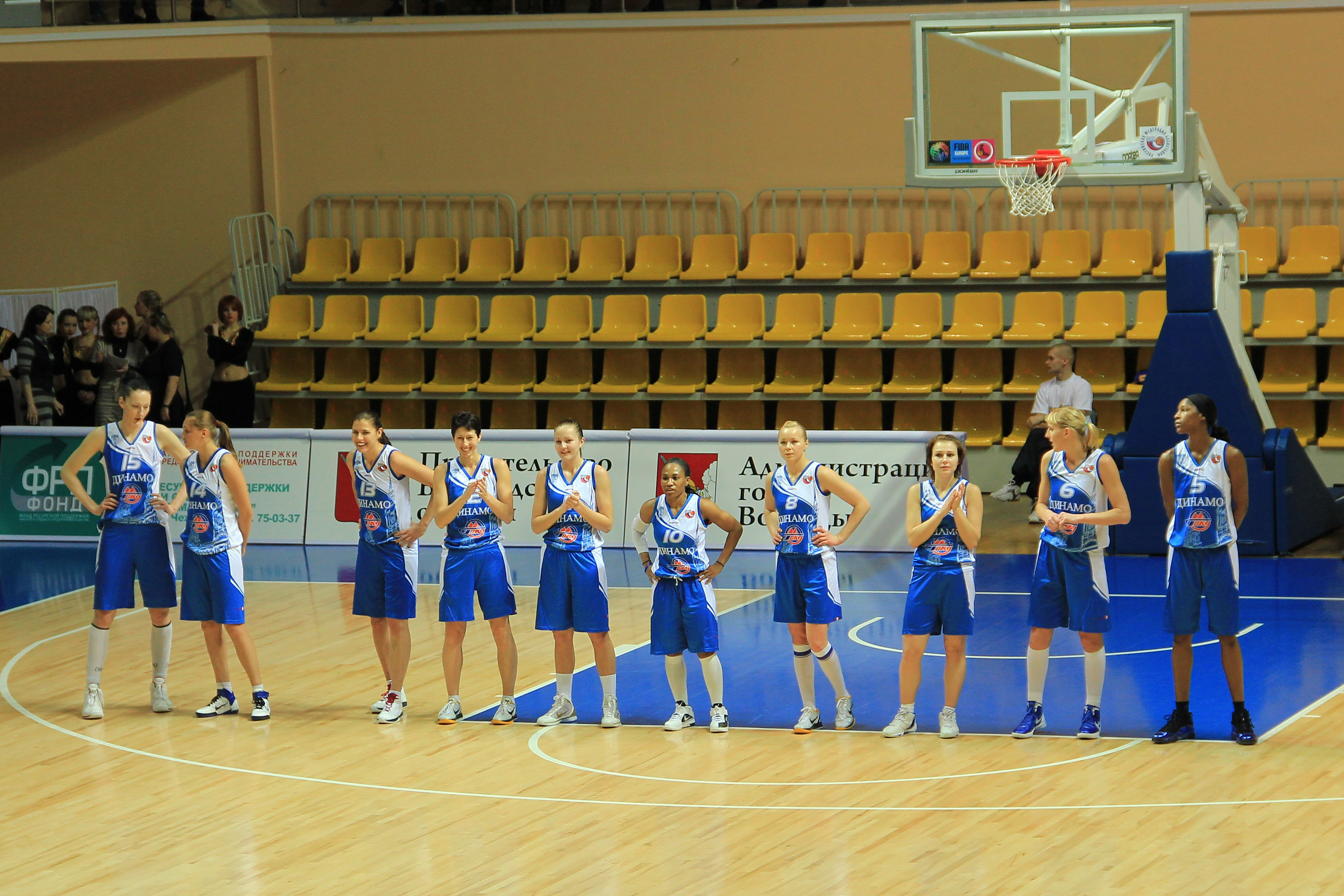
"Dynamo" Kursk's Basketball players, 2012.

WBC Dynamo Kursk (Russian: ЖБК «Динамо» Курск) is a Russian professional women's basketball club from Kursk playing in the Russian Premier League. They won their first FIBA Eurocup title in 2012. In the 2016–17 season, Kursk won the EuroLeague Women after going undefeated in the competition. In reaction to the 2022 Russian invasion of Ukraine, in February 2022 EuroLeague Women suspended the club.

== History ==
- 1994: WBC "Svetlana" Kursk formed.
- 1997: renamed Dynamo Kursk.
- 1999: started participating in the Russian Women's Super League.
- 2008–09: qualified to semi-final in FIBA Eurocup.
- 2009–10 and 2010–11: 4th place in the Russian Women's Super League.
- 2012: for the first time won the FIBA Eurocup.
- 2014–15: in their debut 2014–15 Euroleague won bronze.
- 2016–17: for the first time entered final of the 2016–17 Euroleague.
- 2022: Suspended by Euroleague Women.

== Titles ==
- FIBA Euroleague:
  - Winners: 2016–17
  - Runners-up: 2018–19
  - (bronze) Third place: 2014–15, 2017–18
- FIBA Eurocup:
  - Winners: 2011–12
  - Runners-up: 2013–14
- Baltic Women's Basketball League:
  - Winners: 2016–17
- Russian Championships:
  - Runners-up: 2016–17, 2017–18, 2018–19, 2019–20, 2020–21
  - (bronze) Third place: 2013–14, 2014–15, 2015–16
- Russian Cup:
  - Winners: 2014–15, 2015–16, 2017–18, 2019–20
  - Runners-up: 2016–17, 2018–19, 2020–21
  - (bronze) Third place: 2013–14

=== Other achievements ===
- FIBA Euroleague: Quarterfinals (2015)
- FIBA Eurocup: Semi-Final (2009)
- Russian Women's Basketball Premier League: 4th place (2010, 2011)

== Roster ==
Dynamo Kursk roster
Players	Coaches
Pos. / No. / Nat. / Name / Ht. / Wt. / Age; PG / 9 / (Russia) / Levchenko, Xenia / 1.67 m (5 ft 6 in) / 54 kg (119 lb) / 30 – 29 March 1996	Head coach Assistant coach(es): (Spain) Cesar Ruperez; (Spain) Roberto Hernández; (Russia) Kalyu Korstin; Legend: (C) Team captain; Injured; Roster; Updated: 2019-03-11

== Former notable players ==
- (Turkey) Işıl Alben
- (Russia) Anna Petrakova
- (Latvia) Gunta Baško
- (Lithuania) Aušra Bimbaitė
- (United States) Temeka Johnson
- (United States) Michelle Snow
- (United States) Breanna Stewart
