= Kayseri Basketbol =

Melikgazi Basketbol
- Leagues: Super League
- Founded: 1986; 40 years ago
- History: TED Kayseri Koleji; 2005–2007; Panküp TED Kayseri Koleji; 2007–2009; Panküp Kayseri Şekerspor; 2009–2011; Kayseri Kaski Spor; 2011–2014; Abdullah Gül Üniversitesi; 2014–2018; Melikgazi Kayseri Basketbol; 2018–2026; Melikgazi Basketbol; 2026–present
- Arena: Kadir Has Spor Salonu (capacity 7,200)
- Location: Kayseri, Turkey
- Team colors: Red and yellow
- President: (Turkey) Yakup Yüksel
- Head coach: (Turkey) Emin Süel
- Website: kayseribasketbol.com
Home	Away

Melikgazi Basketbol Spor Kulübü is a Turkish women's basketball club based in Kayseri, Turkey. The club was founded in 1986.

== History ==
- 2005–2007: TED Kayseri Koleji
- 2007–2011: Panküp TED Kayseri Koleji
- 2011–2014: Kayseri Kaski Spor
- 2014–2018: AGÜ Spor (Abdullah Gül Üniversitesi)
- 2018–2026: Melikgazi Kayseri Basketbol
- 2026–present: Melikgazi Basketbol

== Current roster ==
Melikgazi Basketbol roster
Players
Coaches

Pos.	No.	Nat.	Name	Ht.	Age
SF	1	(Turkey)	Takmaz, Gamze	1.80 m (5 ft 11 in)	35 – 1 February 1991
G	4	(United States)	Littleton, Destiny	1.75 m (5 ft 9 in)	27 – 1 July 1999
SG	5	(Turkey)	Gülçelik, Pelin	1.78 m (5 ft 10 in)	24 – 16 May 2002
G/F	6	(Turkey)	Uçar, Rana	1.75 m (5 ft 9 in)	23 – 3 October 2002
PG	7	(Turkey)	Uygül, Merve	1.70 m (5 ft 7 in)	38 – 30 September 1988
F	11	(Turkey)	İplikci, Melis		19 – 10 October 2006
F	12	(Turkey)	Emirtekin, Elif	1.85 m (6 ft 1 in)	32 – 12 August 1994
C	15	(Turkey)	Güçlü, İnci	2.05 m (6 ft 9 in)	27 – 26 February 1999
C	23	(India)	Kaur, Honey	1.93 m (6 ft 4 in)	23 – 5 June 2003
G	24	(United States) (Lebanon)	Jones, Morgan (DC)	1.87 m (6 ft 2 in)	26 – 2 October 1999
F/C	32	(United States) (Hungary)	Mompremier, Beatrice (DC)	1.93 m (6 ft 4 in)	30 – 8 August 1996
G/F	33	(Turkey)	Alper, Doğa Bengisu	1.78 m (5 ft 10 in)	26 – 29 September 2000
PG	38	(Turkey)	Dalkılıç, Feray	1.68 m (5 ft 6 in)	21 – 30 April 2005
G		(United States)	McDonald, Aari	1.68 m (5 ft 6 in)	28 – 20 August 1998

Head coach

- (Turkey) Emin Süel

Assistant coach(es)

- (Turkey) Nihat Kahraman

Legend

- (C) Team captain
- (DC) Dual citizenship
- Injured

- Roster
Updated: 30 September 2026

== Notable players ==
- (United States) Kalani Brown
- (United States) Destiny Slocum
- (Somalia) (Sweden) Farhiya Abdi

== Honours ==
Kayseri Basketbol
Medal record

Women's basketball

Representing Kayseri Kaski S.K.

EuroCup Women
Silver medal – second place	EuroCup Women	2011–12
Silver medal – second place	EuroCup Women	2012–13

Turkish Women's Basketball League
Bronze medal – third place	Turkish League	2010–11
Bronze medal – third place	Turkish League	2011–12
Bronze medal – third place	Turkish League	2013–14
Silver medal – second place	Turkish League	2014–15

=== European competitions ===
- EuroLeague Women

Quarter-Finalists (1): 2013–14

- EuroCup Women

Runners-up (3): 2011–12, 2012–13, 2016–17
Quarter-Finalists (1): 2019–20, 2023–24,

=== Domestic competitions ===
- Turkish Women's Basketball League

Runners-up (1): 2014–15

- Turkish Women's Basketball Cup

Runners-up (1): 2016–17

- Turkish Women's Second Basketball League

Winners (1): 2005–06
