= French Federation of Basketball =

Governing body of basketball in France

French Basketball Federation
- Sport: Basketball
- Jurisdiction: France
- Abbreviation: FFBB
- Founded: 1932
- Affiliation: FIBA
- Regional affiliation: FIBA Europe
- Headquarters: Paris
- CEO: Jean-Pierre Siutat

Official website
- www.ffbb.com
- (France)

The French Basketball Federation (French: Fédération française de basket-ball, FFBB) is the governing body of basketball in France. It was founded in 1932 and has been a member of FIBA since 1933.

The Federation operates the France national teams and organises the Coupe de France (French Cup) and the amateurs national championships; for the professional championship, the Ligue Nationale de Basketball (LNB) (men) and the LFB (women) have a delegation from the FFBB. It publishes BasketBall Magazine (formerly known as Basket-Ball).

== France 1st Division ==
=== Men's Clubs (Pro A) ===
Clubs are listed by their geographical designations on the official LNB website.

(2021–22 season)

- Boulogne-Levallois (Metropolitans 92)
- Bourg-en-Bresse (JL Bourg Basket)
- Cholet (Cholet Basket)
- Chalon-Reims (Champagne Basket)
- Dijon (JDA Dijon)
- Fos-sur-Mer (Fos Provence Basket)
- Gravelines-Dunkerque (BCM Gravelines-Dunkerque)
- Le Mans (Le Mans Sarthe Basket)
- Le Portel (ESSM Le Portel)
- Limoges (Limoges CSP)
- Lyon-Villeurbanne (ASVEL Basket)
- Monaco (AS Monaco Basket)
- Nanterre (Nanterre 92)
- Orléans (Orléans Loiret Basket)
- Paris (Paris Basketball)
- Pau-Lacq-Orthez (Élan Béarnais)
- Roanne (Chorale Roanne Basket)
- Strasbourg (Strasbourg IG)

=== Women's Clubs (LFB) ===
As in the list of men's clubs above, geographic designations are those found on LFB's official site.

(2021–22 season)

- Angers (Union Féminine Angers Basket 49)
- Bourges (Tango Bourges Basket)
- Charleville-Mézières (Flammes Carolo Basket Ardennes)
- Charnay (Charnay Basket Bourgogne Sud)
- Landerneau (Landerneau Bretagne Basket)
- Landes (Basket Landes)
- Lyon (ASVEL Féminin)
- Montpellier (BLMA)
- Roche Vendée (Roche Vendée Basket Club)
- Saint-Amand (Saint-Amand Hainaut Basket)
- Tarbes (Tarbes Gespe Bigorre)
- Villeneuve-d’Ascq (ESBVA-LM)

== See also ==
- List of basketball clubs in France
