= Adana ASKİ SK =

Turkish sports club

Adana ASKİ Spor Kulübü
- Leagues: TKBL; EuroCup Women
- Founded: 2000
- History: Ceyhan Belediyespor (2000–2014); Adana ASKİ SK (2014–present)
- Arena: Menderes Sports Hall
- Location: Adana, Turkey
- Team colors: Blue and white
- President: Rahmi Pekar
- Head coach: Kaan Artun
- Website: www.adanaaskispor.com

Adana ASKİ SK is a sports club in Adana. Its principal branch is the women's basketball, currently performing at the top flight of the Turkish Women’s Basketball Super League (KBSL). The venue of the basketball team is Menderes Sports Hall.

== History ==
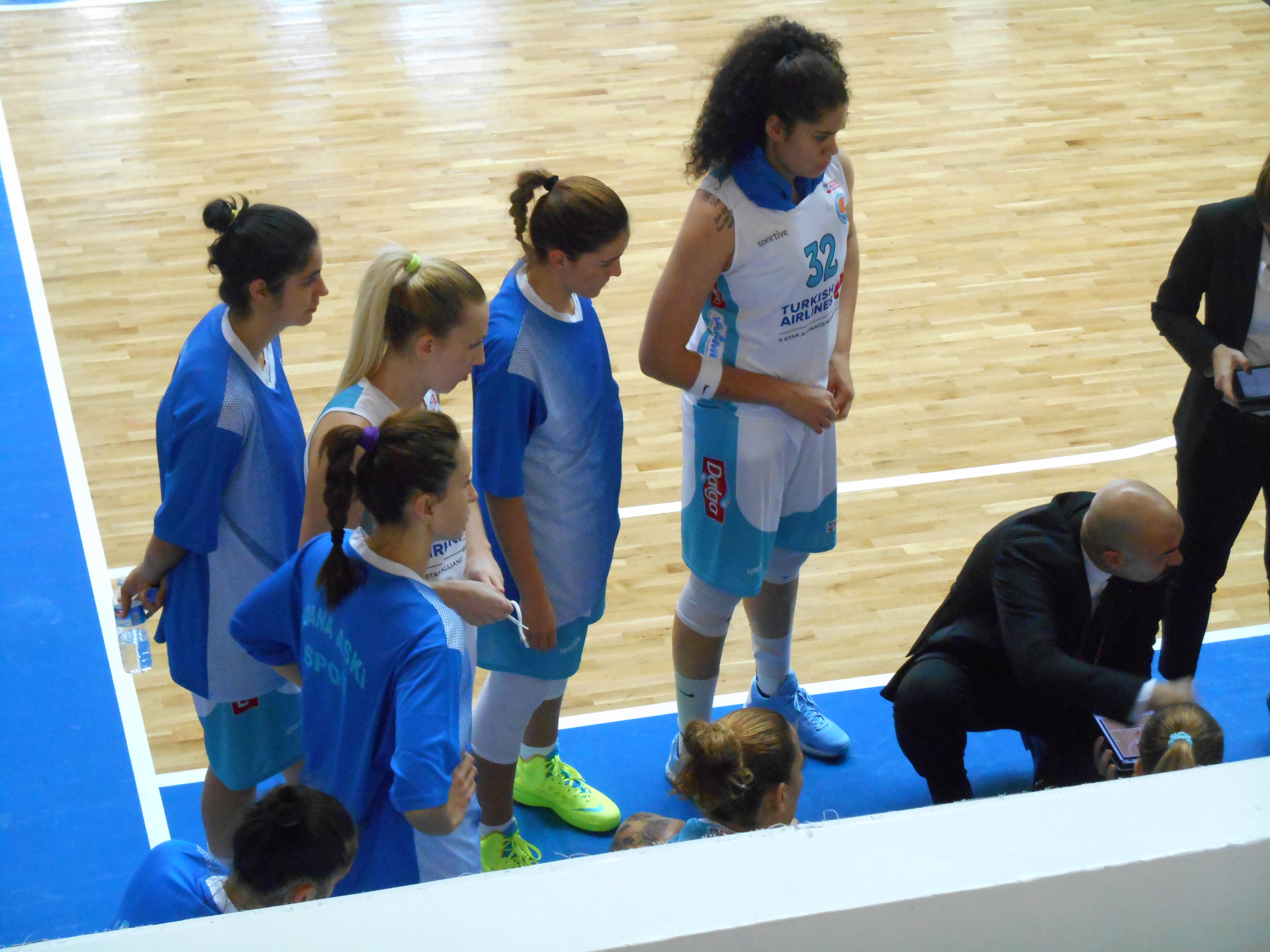
Before the game

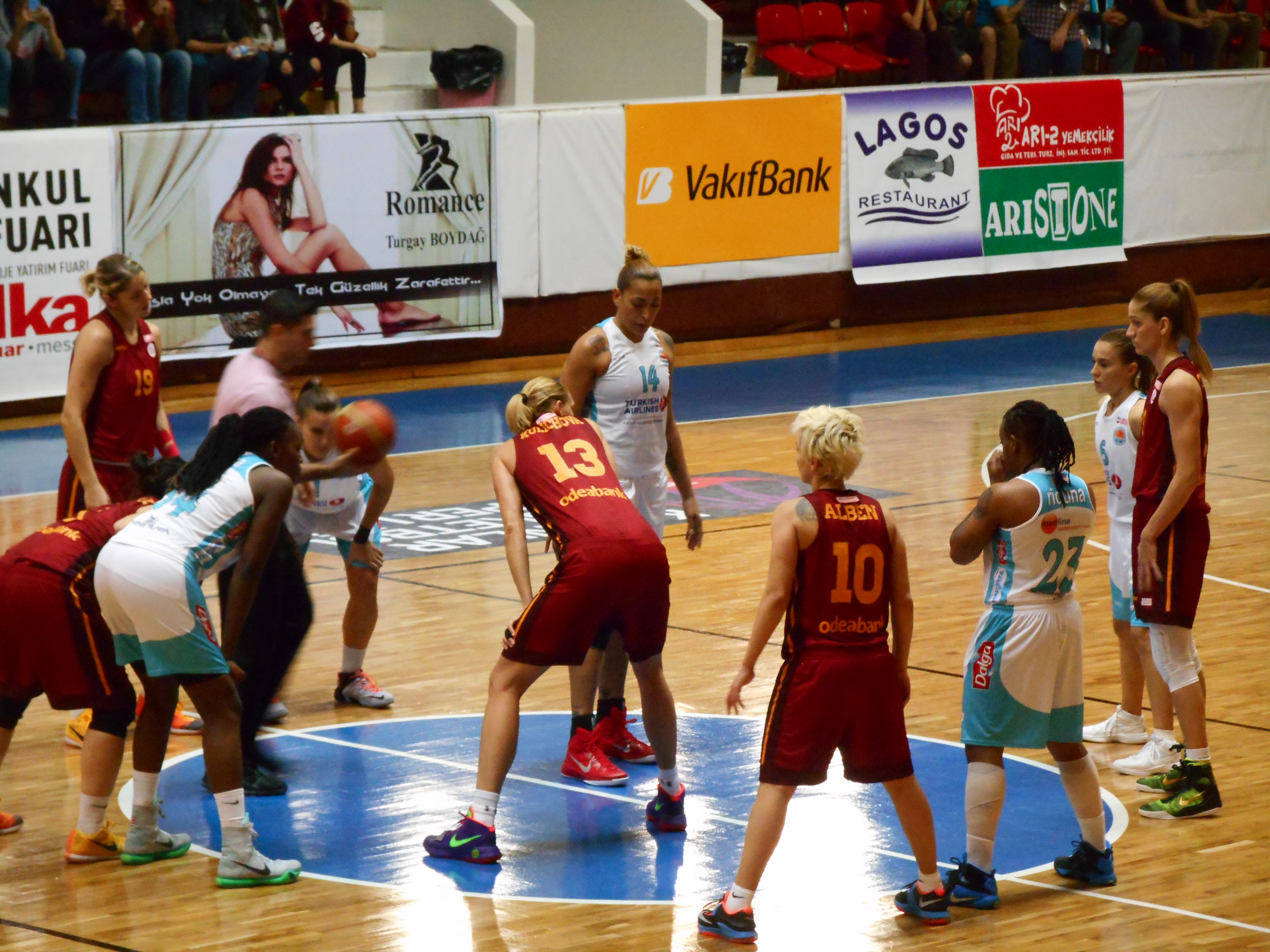
At game start

The club was founded in Ceyhan in 2000, under the name 'Ceyhan Belediyespor' by the Ceyhan Municipality. The first branch of the club was wrestling, and the year after, the women's basketball team was formed. In its first year, at the 2nd Division of TKBL, Ceyhan Belediyespor was promoted to 1st Division without losing a game. At the top flight of Turkey's basketball, the club performed for 12 straight years, before moving to Adana. Tarsus Belediye were consolidated into Adana ASKİ. In 2014, the club was taken by the Water and Sanitary Management Department of the Adana Metropolitan Municipality and renamed as Adana ASKİ. After the move, the club performed the best season ever (2014–15), playing final at the Turkish Women's Cup and semi-final at the TKBL First Division.

== Honors ==
- Turkish Women's Basketball League
  - Semi-finals (1): 2014–15
- Turkish Women's Cup Basketball
  - Runner-up (2): 2010–11, 2014–15

== Women's basketball 2016–17 season ==
=== Depth chart ===
Pos.	Starting 5	Bench
C	Avery Warley	Edita Sujanova
PF	Alysha Clark	Sanem Zerem
SF	Kubra Erat
SG	Asana Yalcin	Ezgi Manlaci
PG	Alex Bentley	Oyku Taskin

== Notable players ==
- (United States) (Israel) Alysha Clark
