= Chevakata Vologda =

Russian basketball club

- Leagues: Russian Premier League
- Founded: 1995
- Arena: SCC Spectr
- Location: Vologda, Russia
- Team colors: Blue and yellow
- President: Evgeny Shulepov
- Head coach: Dmitry Donskov
- Website: chevakata.ru
| Home | Away |

BC Chevakata Vologda (Russian: БК Вологда-Чеваката) is a Russian women's basketball club from Vologda playing in the Russian Premier League. Created in 1995 as Politehnik Vologda, it took its current name the following year after its founders Valentina Cherepanova and Tatiana Karamysheva. Usually ranking between the 5th and 8th positions in the championship, in 2001 it was 3rd and in 2008 it reached the play-off semifinals. Since 2001 it has been a regular in the FIBA Eurocup, reaching the semifinals in 2011 and 2012.

== Notable players ==
- Emma Cannon (born 1989), American basketball player for the Israeli team Elitzur Ramla
