= Basket Landes =

- Leagues: La Boulangère Wonderligue
- Founded: 2003
- Arena: Espace Francois Mitterrand (capacity: 2,500)
- Location: Mont de Marsan, France
- Team colors: Blue and White
- President: (France) Audrey Lacroix
- Head coach: (France) Julie Barennes
- Website: https://www.basket-landes.com/
Home	Away

The Basket Landes is a French professional women's basketball club from Mont de Marsan, that currently plays in the La Boulangère Wonderligue (French's first division for women's basketball).

== Honours ==
- Ligue Féminine
  - Winners (1): 2021
- French Cup
  - Winners (2): 2022, 2023

== Players ==
=== Current roster ===
Note: Flags indicate national team eligibility at FIBA-sanctioned events. Players may hold other non-FIBA nationalities not displayed.

Basket Landes roster
Players
Coaches

Pos.	No.	Nat.	Name	Ht.	Age
PG	3	(Puerto Rico)	San Antonio, Trinity	1.74 m (5 ft 9 in)	22 – 28 October 2003
PG	4	(France)	Dechanoz, Emma	1.69 m (5 ft 7 in)	19 – 3 March 2007
PG	5	(France)	Pardon, Marie	1.78 m (5 ft 10 in)	25 – 5 January 2001
SF	6	(France)	Elenga, Sophia	1.84 m (6 ft 0 in)	31 – 1 June 1995
SG	7	(France)	Droguet, Camille	1.78 m (5 ft 10 in)	27 – 15 June 1999
SF	9	(France)	Daramy, Mariama	1.80 m (5 ft 11 in)	24 – 11 August 2002
SG	10	(France)	Peytour, Emma	1.72 m (5 ft 8 in)	26 – 11 August 2000
C	11	(Nigeria)	Musa, Murjanatu	1.88 m (6 ft 2 in)	26 – 5 May 2000
C	13	(France)	Macquet, Sixtine	1.96 m (6 ft 5 in)	25 – 5 December 2000
C	14	(France)	Diagne, Aminata	1.93 m (6 ft 4 in)	19 – 6 March 2007
PF	23	(Latvia)	Gulbe, Aleksa	1.91 m (6 ft 3 in)	26 – 5 February 2000
PF	25	(Belgium)	Massey, Becky	1.86 m (6 ft 1 in)	26 – 21 March 2000

Head coach

- (France) Julie Barennes

Assistant coach(es)

- (France) Marie-Julie Levant
- (France) Olivier Constant

Legend

- (C) Team captain
- Injured

- Roster
Updated: 30 September 2026
