= Mersin Büyükşehir Belediyespor (women's basketball) =

Turkish basketball team

Mersin Büyükşehir Belediyesi S.K. Women's Basketball
- Leagues: Turkish Women's Basketball League
- Founded: 1993
- Arena: Edip Buran Arena (capacity : 1,750); Servet Tazegül Arena (capacity : 7,500)
- Location: Mersin, Turkey
- Team colors: Orange and Blue
- President: (Turkey) Erol Ertan
- Head coach: (Turkey) Murat Alkas
- Website: Mersin Büyükşehir Belediyesi

Mersin Büyükşehir Belediyesi S.K. Women's Basketball is the women basketball section of Mersin Büyükşehir Belediyesi S.K., a major sports club in Mersin, Turkey.

The team plays their home games at the 1,750-seating capacity Edip Buran Arena.
After 2013 Mediterranean Games, they played their matches in Servet Tazegül Arena (capacity : 7,500).

== Achievements ==
- Turkish Women's Basketball League:
  - Runners-up (1): 2008-09
- President Cup:
  - Winners (1): 2008-09

== Roster ==
Note: Flags indicate national team eligibility at FIBA-sanctioned events. Players may hold other non-FIBA nationalities not displayed.

Mersin BB women's roster
Players
Coaches

Pos.	No.	Nat.	Name	Ht.	Wt.	Age
G	21	(United States)	Faulkner, Jamierra	1.68 m (5 ft 6 in)		34 – 17 February 1992
G	24	(Ukraine)	Moss, D'Andra	1.78 m (5 ft 10 in)		38 – 21 February 1988
G/F	7	(Turkey)	Derin, Rana	1.75 m (5 ft 9 in)		34 – 26 June 1992
F	13	(Ukraine)	Malashenko, Olesia	1.91 m (6 ft 3 in)		35 – 21 February 1991
C	2	(United States)	Snow, Michelle	1.94 m (6 ft 4 in)		46 – 20 March 1980
G	4	(Turkey)	Duman, Gulsah	1.77 m (5 ft 10 in)		33 – 19 January 1993
G	4	(Croatia)	Ivezić, Jelena	1.82 m (6 ft 0 in)		42 – 17 March 1984
F	17	(Turkey)	Akkaya, Gülşah	1.81 m (5 ft 11 in)		48 – 6 October 1977
F	35	(Turkey)	Yildaz, Ferda	1.83 m (6 ft 0 in)		32 – 26 July 1993
F/C	3	(Turkey)	Guler, Emel	1.85 m (6 ft 1 in)		34 – 16 January 1992

Head coach

(Turkey) Murat Alkas

Legend

- (C) Team captain
- Injured

- Roster
Updated: October 22, 2016
