= BC Namur-Capitale =

Belgian women's basketball club

Namur-Capitale
- Leagues: Belgian Championship
- Founded: 2010; 16 years ago
- Arena: Hall Octave Henry
- Capacity: 1,500
- Location: Namur, Belgium
- President: Jean-François Davreux
- Head coach: José Miguel Araujo
- Championships: 16 Belgian Leagues; 11 Belgian Cup
Home	Away

Basketball Club Namur-Capital, also known as Belfius Namur-Capitale for sponsorship reasons, is a Belgian women's basketball club from Namur. It was founded in 2010 from the merge of local teams Saint Servais and Novia.

St. Servais was the most successful team in the Belgian Championship with sixteen championships between 1991 and 2009. In its first season following the merge BC Namur-Capitale was 4th, qualifying for the 2012 Eurocup.

== Current roster ==
BC Namur Capitale roster
Players
Coaches

Pos.	No.	Nat.	Name	Ht.	Wt.	Age
PG	4	(Portugal)	Matos Viana, Inès	1.66 m (5 ft 5 in)		32 – 10 July 1994
F	6	(Russia)	Ogun, Kamilla	1.85 m (6 ft 1 in)		27 – 7 May 1999
F	8	(Belgium)	Dossou, Sarah	1.73 m (5 ft 8 in)		26 – 7 January 2000
F	9	(Belgium)	Baggio, Laura	1.76 m (5 ft 9 in)		28 – 5 March 1998
F	10	(Belgium)	Matthys, Sarah	1.78 m (5 ft 10 in)		25 – 29 October 2000
G/F	12	(Belgium)	Davreux, Clarisse	1.71 m (5 ft 7 in)		28 – 20 February 1998
F	24	(United States)	Range, Courtney	1.90 m (6 ft 3 in)		31 – 22 March 1995
G		(Netherlands)	Klerx, Jacobine	1.75 m (5 ft 9 in)		31 – 1 December 1994
C		(Belgium) (Democratic Republic of the Congo)	Nawezhi, Hatty	1.86 m (6 ft 1 in)		32 – 7 September 1994

Head coach

- (Belgium) Aurélien Garraux

Assistant coach(es)

- (Belgium) Jérémie Palix

Legend

- (C) Team captain
- Injured

- Roster
Updated: 2021-06-28

== Titles ==
- Belgian Championship
  - Winners (16): 1991, 1992, 1993, 1994, 1997, 1998, 1999, 2000, 2001, 2002, 2003, 2004, 2005, 2006, 2007, 2009, 2013
- Belgian Cup
  - Winners (9): 1992, 1993, 1994, 1998, 1999, 2000, 2002, 2003, 2004, 2005, 2006, 2013, 2016, 2018

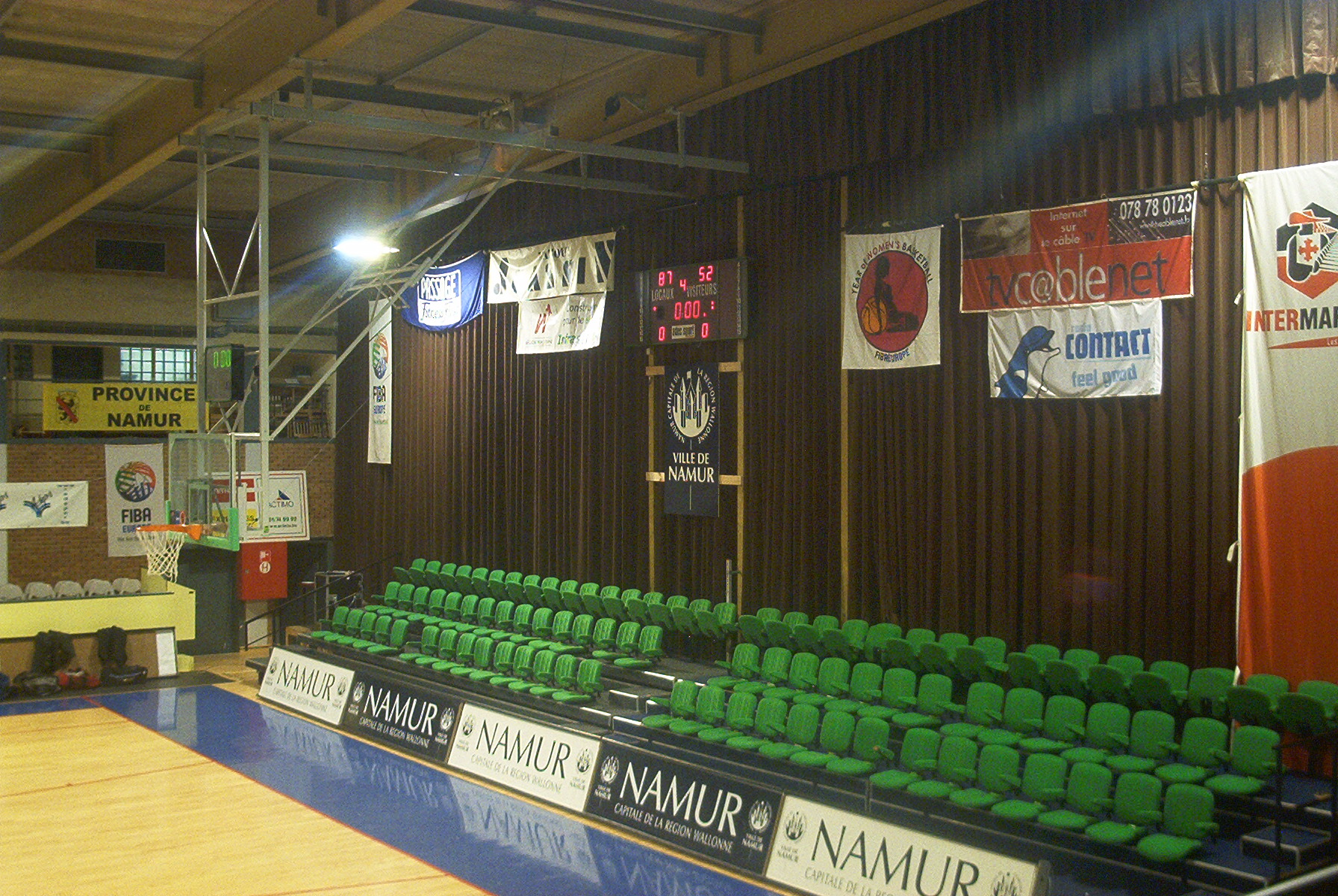
The Hall Henry Namur

== Notable former players ==
- (Belgium) Marjorie Carpréaux
- (Belgium) Antonia Delaere
- (Belgium) Serena-Lynn Geldof
- (Belgium) Sofie Hendrickx
- (Belgium) Kyara Linskens
- (Belgium) Hanne Mestdagh
- (Slovakia) (United States) Erin Lawless
- (Spain) Mariona Ortiz
- (Romania) Annemarie Părău
