= İstanbul Üniversitesi SK =

Turkish women's basketball team

- Leagues: Turkish Regional League (KBBL)
- Founded: 1953; 72 years ago
- Arena: Şehit Mustafa Özel Spor Kompleksi
- Location: Istanbul, Turkey
- Team colors: Green and Yellow
- President: (Turkey) Bülent Bayraktar
- Head coach: (Turkey) Emre Özsarı
- Championships: 1 Turkish Super League: 1988-1989; 2 Turkish Basketball Championship: 1960-1961, 1961-1962
- Website: İstanbul Üniversitesi

İstanbul Üniversitesi SK is a Turkish women's basketball club based in Istanbul, Turkey. The club plays in the Turkish Regional League (KBBL), the third level women's basketball league in Turkey. İstanbul Üniversitesi has a championship in the Turkish Super League, the highest basketball women's league in Turkey.

== Honours ==
- Turkish Super League
  - Winners (1): 1988-89
