= 2020 Magyar Kupa (women's basketball) =

63rd season of the Hungarian Basketball Cup

2020 Killik László Magyar Kupa
Tournament details
- Arena: Lauber Dezső Sportcsarnok; Pécs, Hungary
- Dates: 5–7 March

Final positions
- Champions: Sopron Basket (9th title)
- Runners-up: Atomerőmű KSC Szekszárd
- Third place: ZTE Női Kosárlabda Klub
- Fourth place: TFSE MTK

Awards and statistics
- MVP: (Serbia) Aleksandra Crvendakić
- Top scorer(s): (Serbia) Aleksandra Crvendakić

The 2020 László Killik Női Magyar Kupa is the 63rd season of the Hungarian Basketball Cup.

== Qualification ==
Eight highest ranked teams after the first half of the 2019–20 NB I/A regular season qualified to the tournament.

1. Sopron Basket
2. Aluinvent DVTK
3. ZTE Női Kosárlabda Klub
4. Atomerőmű KSC Szekszárd
5. PEAC-Pécs
6. Uni Győr MÉLY-ÚT
7. NKE-FCSM Csata
8. TFSE MTK

== Bracket ==
Quarterfinals; February 28
TFSE MTK	82
PEAC-Pécs	78
Aluinvent DVTK	55
Sopron Basket	62
Uni Győr MÉLY-ÚT	76
ZTE Női Kosárlabda Klub	77
NKE-FCSM Csata	65
Atomerőmű KSC Szekszárd	85

Semifinals; March 1
TFSE MTK	90
Sopron Basket	99
ZTE Női Kosárlabda Klub	59
Atomerőmű KSC Szekszárd	86

Final; March 2
Sopron Basket	54
Atomerőmű KSC Szekszárd	42
Third place
TFSE MTK	75
ZTE Női Kosárlabda Klub	94

=== Semifinals ===
6 March Semifinal I	TFSE MTK	90–99	Sopron Basket	Pécs
16:30 (CET)	Scoring by quarter: 30–24, 13–25, 24–23, 23–27
	Pts: C. Jenkins 31; Rebs: C. Jenkins 6 Asts: Doktor 4 PIR: C. Jenkins 31	Boxscore	Pts: Brooks 21; Rebs: Brooks, Krajišnik 5 Asts: Dénesné Fegyverneky 7 PIR: January, Brooks 26	Arena: Lauber Dezső Sportcsarnok; Referees: J. Ádám, A. Fodor, V. Nagy, (L. Fekete)

6 March Semifinal II	ZTE Női Kosárlabda Klub	59–86	Atomerőmű KSC Szekszárd	Pécs
19:00 (CET)	Scoring by quarter: 20–15, 9–30, 17–20, 13–21
	Pts: Hayes 19; Rebs: Kuttor 9 Asts: Nagy, Horti, Kovács 3 PIR: Hayes 24	Boxscore	Pts: Marshall 21; Rebs: Marshall, McCall, Růžičková, Theodoreán 6 Asts: Marshall, Á. Studer 4 PIR: Marshall 32	Arena: Lauber Dezső Sportcsarnok; Referees: D. Tőzsér, L. Goda, Gy. Balogh, (Zs. Hartyáni)

=== Bronze match ===
7 March Bronze match	TFSE MTK	75–94	ZTE Női Kosárlabda Klub	Pécs
14:30 (CET)	Scoring by quarter: 16–22, 14–32, 22–14, 23–26
	Pts: A. Jenkins 24; Rebs: A. Jenkins 6 Asts: C. Jenkins 7 PIR: A. Jenkins 34	Boxscore	Pts: Hayes 33; Rebs: Hayes, Nagy 11; Asts: Burkholder, Horti 5 PIR: Hayes 47	Arena: Lauber Dezső Sportcsarnok; Referees: L. Minár, N. Kovács, R. Győrfy, (J. Gincsai)

=== Final ===
7 March Final	Sopron Basket	54–42	Atomerőmű KSC Szekszárd	Pécs
17:00 (CET)	Scoring by quarter: 20–13, 8–11, 16–14, 10–4
	Pts: Crvendakić 13; Rebs: Crvendakić 10; Asts: Crvendakić 3 PIR: Crvendakić 22	Boxscore	Pts: Krnjić 12; Rebs: McCall 9 Asts: Á. Studer, Dojkić, Krnjić, Theodoreán 2 PIR: Krnjić 21	Arena: Lauber Dezső Sportcsarnok; Referees: Cs. Cziffra, C. Tóth, B. Csabai-Kaskötő, J. Ádám, (Zs. Várhalmi)

Starters:			Pts	Reb	Ast
PG	20	(United States) Briann January	11	4	2
SG	14	(Hungary) Zsófia Fegyverneky	4	4	2
F	11	(Serbia) Aleksandra Crvendakić	13	10	3
PF	9	(Serbia) Jelena Brooks	9	5	2
C	44	(Hungary) Bernadett Határ	4	4	0
Reserves:					
PF	10	(United States) Candice Dupree	9	0	1
SG	27	(Hungary) Virág Weninger	4	1	1
F/C	33	(Serbia) Tina Krajišnik	0	4	1
SF	4	(Hungary) Debóra Dubei	DNP		
SF	12	(Hungary) Dalma Czukor	DNP		
SG		(Hungary) Aliz Varga	DNP		
PG	13	(Hungary) Kamilla Varga	DNP		
Head coach:
(Hungary) Dávid Gáspár

Sopron	Szekszárd

Sopron	Statistics	Szekszárd
16/42 (38%)	2 point field goals	10/43 (23%)
5/14 (36%)	3 point field goals	3/13 (23%)
7/9 (78%)	Free throws	13/16 (81%)
32	Rebounds	30
12	Assists	9
7	Steals	7
12	Turnovers	13
3	Blocks	3
18 (16)	Fouls	16 (18)

2020 Magyar Kupa Winners
Sopron Basket
9th title
MVP
(Serbia) Aleksandra Crvendakić

Starters:			Pts	Reb	Ast
PG	9	(Hungary) Ágnes Studer	6	3	2
SG	18	(Croatia) Ivana Dojkić	2	2	2
SF	15	(United States) Tyaunna Marshall	7	5	1
PF	24	(United States) Erica McCall	6	9	0
C	14	(Slovakia) Marie Růžičková	6	3	0
Reserves:					
C	12	(Serbia) Sara Krnjić	12	6	2
G/F	3	(Hungary) Alexandra Theodoreán	0	1	2
SF	31	(Hungary) Bálint Réka	3	1	0
G/F	10	(Hungary) Melinda Miklós	DNP		
PF	20	(Hungary) Dóra Horváth	DNP		
G/F		(Hungary) Rebeka Holcz	DNP		
PG	4	(Hungary) Zsuzsa Studer	DNP		
Head coach:
(Serbia) Željko Đokić

==== Final standings ====
	Team
Hungarian Cup	Sopron Basket
Silver medal	Atomerőmű KSC Szekszárd
Bronze medal	20px ZTE Női Kosárlabda Klub
4.	20px TFSE MTK
5.	Aluinvent DVTK Miskolc
5.	NKE-FCSM Csata
5.	Uni Győr MÉLY-ÚT
5.	PEAC-Pécs

== See also ==
- 2019–20 Nemzeti Bajnokság I/A
