= 2020–21 Nemzeti Bajnokság I/A (women's basketball) =

Női NB I. A csoport
- Season: 2020–21
- Duration: October 2, 2020 - March 10, 2021 (regular season); March 25 – May 7, 2021 (playoffs)
- Games played: 132 (regular season)
- Teams: 12
- TV partner(s): M4 Sport

Finals
- Champions: Sopron Basket (14th title)
- Runners-up: Atomerőmű KSC Szekszárd
- Semifinalists: UNI Győr Mély-Út; Aluinvent DVTK

Statistical leaders
Points	(United States) Keyona Hayes	23.92
Rebounds	(Lithuania) Daugilė Šarauskaitė	12.11
Assists	(Hungary) Dóra Medgyessy	8.18
Index Rating	(United States) Keyona Hayes	33.25

Records
- Biggest home win: Sopron Basket 98–33 Ludovika-FCSM Csata (13 February 2021)
- Biggest away win: Zalaegerszegi TE NKK 42–129 Atomerőmű KSC Szekszárd (21 October 2020)

The 2020–21 Nemzeti Bajnokság I/A was the 84th season of the Nemzeti Bajnokság I/A, the highest tier professional basketball league in Hungary. The season was the first to be played after the previous season was abandoned due to the COVID-19 pandemic. The previous season was cancelled in March 2020.

== Teams ==
Location of teams in 2020-21 Nemzeti Bajnokság I/A

The following 12 clubs compete in the NB I/A during the 2020–21 season.

Team	City	Arena	Capacity
ELTE BEAC Újbuda	Budapest	Gabányi László Sportcsarnok	400
VBW CEKK Cegléd	Cegléd	Gál János Sportcsarnok	1,200
Ludovika-FCSM Csata	Budapest	Ludovika Aréna	1,500
Aluinvent DVTK	Miskolc	Generali Aréna	1,688
Uni Győr MÉLY-ÚT	Győr	Egyetemi Csarnok	1,378
TFSE-MTK	Budapest	Városmajori Csarnok	400
PEAC-Pécs	Pécs	Lauber Dezső Sportcsarnok	2,791
PINKK-Pécsi 424	Pécs	Gandhi-csarnok	300
Sopron Basket	Sopron	Novomatic Aréna	2,200
Atomerőmű KSC Szekszárd	Szekszárd	City Sports Hall	1,100
Vasas Akadémia	Budapest	Pasaréti Sportcentrum	300
Zalaegerszegi TE NKK	Zalaegerszeg	Városi Sportcsarnok	2,000

=== Personnel and kits ===
Team	Head coach	Team captain	Kit manufacturer	Shirt sponsor
ELTE BEAC Újbuda	(Hungary) Judit Balogh			
VBW CEKK Cegléd	(Greece) Kostas Keramidas			
Ludovika-FCSM Csata	(Hungary) Krisztián Tursics			
Aluinvent DVTK	(Hungary) Attila Földi			
Uni Győr MÉLY-ÚT	(Hungary) Dalma Iványi			
TFSE-MTK	(Hungary) Bianka Magyar			
PEAC-Pécs	(Hungary) Ferenc Csirke			
PINKK Pécsi 424	(Serbia) Vanja Miljković			
Sopron Basket	(Hungary) Dávid Gáspár			
Atomerőmű KSC Szekszárd	(Serbia) Željko Djokić			
Vasas Akadémia	(Serbia) Miloš Pavlović			
Zalaegerszegi TE NKK	(Hungary) Péter Ambrus			

==== Managerial changes ====
Team	Outgoing manager	Manner of departure	Date of vacancy	Position in table	Replaced by	Date of appointment
Zalaegerszegi TE NKK	(Hungary) Zsófia Horváth	Signed by Atomerőmű KSC Szekszárd as an Assistant coach	End of 2019–20 season	Pre-season	(Hungary) Péter Ambrus	August 2020

== Regular season ==
Pos	Team	Pld	W	L	PF	PA	PD	Pts	Qualification
1	Sopron Basket	22	22	0	1932	1221	+711	44	Playoffs
2	Uni Győr MÉLY-ÚT	22	19	3	1819	1532	+287	41	Playoffs
3	Atomerőmű KSC Szekszárd	22	18	4	1850	1527	+323	40	Playoffs
4	Aluinvent DVTK	22	13	9	1726	1590	+136	35	Playoffs
5	PEAC-Pécs	22	12	10	1485	1437	+48	34	Playoffs
6	Ludovika-FCSM Csata	22	12	10	1658	1608	+50	34	Playoffs
7	TFSE-MTK	22	10	12	1650	1677	−27	32	Playoffs
8	Vasas Akadémia	22	9	13	1532	1672	−140	31	Playoffs
9	VBW CEKK Cegléd	22	9	13	1515	1528	−13	31	Play-out
10	ELTE BEAC Újbuda	22	5	17	1546	1777	−231	27	Play-out
11	PINKK-Pécsi 424	22	3	19	1435	1792	−357	25	Play-out
12	Zalaegerszegi TE NKK	22	0	22	1281	2068	−787	22	Play-out

Updated to match(es) played on 6 April 2021. Source: hunbasket.hu
Rules for classification: 1) Games played; 2) Points; 3) Wins; 4) Defeats; 5) Points for; 6) Points against; 7) Victories/Defeats series; 8) in Home games; 9) as a Guest; 10) Last 5 matches.

=== Results ===
Home \ Away	DVTK	SZEK	BEAC	CSATA	PEAC	PINK	SOP	MTK	GYŐR	VAS	CEKK	ZTE
Aluinvent DVTK		79–93	108–65	73–79	75–69	90–73	66–73	87–79	57–77	87–68	71–69	90–57
Atomerőmű KSC Szekszárd	67–57		99–70	87–83	87–76	114–66	49–74	81–75	78–84	96–69	94–83	96–62
ELTE BEAC Újbuda	68–73	79–92		80–88	64–71	87–71	52–77	63–78	65–82	56–70	69–86	73–64
Ludovika-FCSM Csata	85–84	78–99	106–66		65–76	86–59	62–82	75–69	77–66	54–42	61–69	99–47
PEAC-Pécs	66–71	51–54	65–59	76–65		69–60	53–72	76–59	54–69	81–69	68–58	110–47
PINKK-Pécsi 424	63–81	71–85	93–95	47–85	48–60		53–104	76–75	63–97	61–76	59–64	76–56
Sopron Basket	82–62	79–56	86–55	98–33	88–53	105–52		98–67	83–50	89–69	74–51	104–48
TFSE-MTK	92–84	54–75	82–64	69–72	83–62	76–63	38–97		71–74	87–75	71–57	90–57
Uni Győr MÉLY-ÚT	73–70	75–64	95–89	92–75	88–56	92–78	79–85	91–82		98–70	93–60	98–76
Vasas Akadémia	64–70	63–90	63–58	88–83	42–58	73–72	71–100	82–83	71–83		66–61	86–62
VBW CEKK Cegléd	65–78	57–65	54–61	80–56	58–53	68–59	55–78	93–89	66–71	69–73		102–70
Zalaegerszegi TE NKK	63–113	42–129	74–108	59–91	56–82	54–72	47–104	75–81	42–92	74–82	49–90	

Source: hunbasket.hu
Legend: Blue = home team win; Yellow = draw; Red = away team win.

=== Statistical leaders ===
==== Efficiency ====
Pos	Player	Club	PIR
1	(United States) Keyona Hayes	Aluinvent DVTK	33.25
2	(United States) Alisia Jenkins	TFSE-MTK	29.76
3	(United States) Brianna Fraser	Vasas Akadémia	26.27
4	(United States) Beatrice Mompremier	Uni Győr MÉLY-ÚT	26.10
5	(Serbia) Tina Krajišnik	Sopron Basket	26.05

==== Points ====
Pos	Player	Club	PPG
1	(United States) Keyona Hayes	Aluinvent DVTK	23.92
2	(United States) Brianna Fraser	Vasas Akadémia	21.32
3	(United States) Alisia Jenkins	TFSE-MTK	19.57
4	(Bosnia and Herzegovina) Miljana Džombeta	Zalaegerszegi TE NKK	18.05
5	(United States) Chanise Jenkins	TFSE-MTK	17.86

==== Rebounds ====
Pos	Player	Club	RPG
1	(Lithuania) Daugilė Šarauskaitė	PINKK-Pécsi 424	12.11
2	(United States) Alisia Jenkins	TFSE-MTK	11.81
3	(United States) Beatrice Mompremier	Uni Győr MÉLY-ÚT	10.95
4	(Ghana) Batabe Zempare	Ludovika-FCSM Csata	10.70
5	(United States) Keyona Hayes	Aluinvent DVTK	10.58

==== Assists ====
Pos	Player	Club	APG
1	(Hungary) Dóra Medgyessy	Aluinvent DVTK	8.18
2	(Bosnia and Herzegovina) Miljana Džombeta	Zalaegerszegi TE NKK	6.77
3	(Hungary) Ágnes Studer	Atomerőmű KSC Szekszárd	6.36
4	(Spain) Mariona Ortiz	VBW CEKK Cegléd	6.33
5	(United States) Brianna Kiesel	Uni Győr MÉLY-ÚT	6.24

== Playoffs ==
Teams in bold won the playoff series. Numbers to the left of each team indicate the team's original playoff seeding. Numbers to the right indicate the score of each playoff game.

Quarter-finals
1	**Sopron Basket**	**2**
8	Vasas Akadémia	1
4	**Aluinvent DVTK**	**2**
5	PEAC-Pécs	0
2	**Uni Győr MÉLY-ÚT**	**2**
7	TFSE-MTK	0
3	**Atomerőmű KSC Szekszárd**	**2**
6	Ludovika-FCSM Csata	0

Semi-finals
1	**Sopron Basket**	**2**
4	Aluinvent DVTK	0
2	Uni Győr MÉLY-ÚT	0
3	**Atomerőmű KSC Szekszárd**	**2**

Finals
1	Sopron Basket	**3**
3	Atomerőmű KSC Szekszárd	1
Third place
4	Aluinvent DVTK	0
2	**Uni Győr MÉLY-ÚT**	**2**

=== Quarter-finals ===
In the quarterfinals, teams playing against each other had to win two games to win the series. Thus, if one team wins two games before all three games have been played, the games that remain are omitted. The team that finished in the higher regular season place, played the first and the third (if it was necessary) games of the series at home.

Team 1	Agg.	Team 2	Game 1	Game 2	Game 3
**Sopron Basket**	2–1	Vasas Akadémia	0–20 (Note: The match was originally won by Sopron at 102-44, but due to Megan Walker’s unauthorized play (she didn’t have a valid sports medicine license), the Association judged the victory to be 20-0 to Vasas.)	92–40	107–35
**Uni Győr MÉLY-ÚT**	2–0	TFSE-MTK	93–75	85–75	—
**Atomerőmű KSC Szekszárd**	2–0	Ludovika-FCSM Csata	89–61	69–63	—
**Aluinvent DVTK**	2–0	PEAC-Pécs	20–0 (Note: The match, scheduled for 23 March 2021, were assessed by Association after PEAC had several cases of positive CODIV-19 tests and unable to play.)	84–81	—

=== Semi-finals ===
In the semifinals, teams playing against each other had to win two games to win the series. Thus, if one team wins two games before all three games have been played, the games that remain are omitted. The team that finished in the higher regular season place, played the first and the third (if it was necessary) games of the series at home.

Team 1	Agg.	Team 2	Game 1	Game 2	Game 3
**Sopron Basket**	2–0	Aluinvent DVTK	89–64	80–57	—
Uni Győr MÉLY-ÚT	0–2	**Atomerőmű KSC Szekszárd**	57–66	75–90	—

=== Finals ===
In the finals, teams playing against each other had to win three games to win the title. Thus, if one team won three games before all five games were played, the remaining games were omitted. The team that finished in the higher regular season place, played the first, the third, and the fifth (if it was necessary) games of the series at home.

Team 1	Agg.	Team 2	Game 1	Game 2	Game 3	Game 4
Sopron Basket	3–1	Atomerőmű KSC Szekszárd	80–57	69–72	81–46	62–54

==== Game 1 ====
25 April 2021	Sopron Basket	**80**–57 (Series: **1–0**)	Atomerőmű KSC Szekszárd	Sopron
15:45 (CEST)	Scoring by quarter: **21**–9, **19**–16, **25**–18, **15**–14
	Pts: T Krajišnik 18; Rebs: J Brooks 8 Asts: J Brooks, B January 6 PIR: J Brooks 30	Report	Pts: C Goree 12; Rebs: E McCall 8 Asts: Á Studer 4 PIR: E McCall 19	Arena: Novomatic Aréna; Attendance: BCD; Referees: T Földházi, G Kapitány, K Varga-Záry, (Zs Várhalmi)

==== Game 2 ====
28 April 2021	Atomerőmű KSC Szekszárd	**72**–69 (Series: **1–1**)	Sopron Basket	Szekszárd
15:45 (CEST)	Scoring by quarter: **19**–16, 13–**15**, **27**–22, 13–**16**
	Pts: Á Studer 17; Rebs: E McCall 12; Asts: Á Studer 6 PIR: Á Studer, E McCall 24	Report	Pts: M Walker 16; Rebs: T Krajišnik 5 Asts: Zs Fegyverneky 5 PIR: M Walker 21	Arena: City Sports Hall; Attendance: BCD; Referees: P Papp, C Tóth, D Tőzsér, (M Faidt)

==== Game 3 ====
1 May 2021	Sopron Basket	**81**–46 (Series: **2–1**)	Atomerőmű KSC Szekszárd	Sopron
14:15 (CEST)	Scoring by quarter: **17**–10, **23**–14, **23**–7, **18**–15
	Pts: B Határ 19; Rebs: B Határ 11; Asts: B January 6 PIR: B Határ 38	Report	Pts: E McCall 9 Rebs: E McCall 8 Asts: Á Studer, S Krnjić 2 PIR: E McCall 11	Arena: Novomatic Aréna; Attendance: 400; Referees: Cs Cziffra, P Praksch, B Csabai-Kaskötő, (J Dr. Gincsai)

==== Game 4 ====
4 May 2021	Atomerőmű KSC Szekszárd	54–**62** (Series: **1–3**)	Sopron Basket	Szekszárd
16:30 (CEST)	Scoring by quarter: 12–**21**, **14**–12, 9–**20**, **19**–9
	Pts: Z Friškovec 17; Rebs: E McCall 11; Asts: Á Studer 3 PIR: Á Studer 17	Report	Pts: J Brooks 15; Rebs: J Brooks, T Krajišnik 7 Asts: B January 5 PIR: J Brooks 24	Arena: City Sports Hall; Attendance: 800; Referees: T Földházi, P Győrffy, J Ádám, (I Bodrogváry)

=== Third place ===
In the series for the third place, teams playing against each other had to win two games to win the 3rd place in the final rankings of the season. Thus, if one team won two games before all three games had been played, the remaining games were omitted. The team that finished in the higher regular season place, played the first and the third (if it was necessary) games of the series at home.

Team 1	Agg.	Team 2	Game 1	Game 2	Game 3
**Uni Győr MÉLY-ÚT**	**2**–0	Aluinvent DVTK	95–77	83–74	

== Playout ==
Pos	Team	Pld	W	L	PF	PA	PD	Pts	Qualification or relegation
9	VBW CEKK Cegléd	28	13	15	414	384	+30	41	
10	ELTE BEAC Újbuda	28	10	18	478	385	+93	38	
11	PINKK-Pécsi 424	28	6	22	418	423	−5	34	
12	Zalaegerszegi TE NKK	28	0	28	353	471	−118	28	Relegation to Nemzeti Bajnokság I/B

Updated to match(es) played on 24 April 2021. Source: hunbasket.hu
Rules for classification: 1) Games played; 2) Points; 3) Wins; 4) Defeats; 5) Points for; 6) Points against; 7) Victories/Defeats series; 8) in Home games; 9) as a Guest; 10) Last 5 matches.

=== Results ===
Home \ Away	BEAC	PINK	CEKK	ZTE
ELTE BEAC Újbuda		70–63	78–66	83–45
PINKK-Pécsi 424	78–99		64–77	85–63
VBW CEKK Cegléd	70–63	54–57		69–48
Zalaegerszegi TE NKK	63–85	60–71	74–78	

Source: hunbasket.hu
Legend: Blue = home team win; Yellow = draw; Red = away team win.

== Final standings ==
Pos	Team	Qualification or Relegation
1st place, gold medalist(s)	Sopron Basket	Qualification to the EuroLeague
2nd place, silver medalist(s)	Atomerőmű KSC Szekszárd	Qualification to the EuroLeague
3rd place, bronze medalist(s)	Uni Győr MÉLY-ÚT	Qualification to the EuroCup
4	Aluinvent DVTK	Qualification to the EuroCup
5	Ludovika-FCSM Csata	Qualification to the EuroCup
6	Vasas Akadémia	Qualification to the EuroCup
7	PEAC-Pécs	
8	TFSE-MTK	
9	VBW CEKK Cegléd	
10	ELTE BEAC Újbuda	
11	PINKK-Pécsi 424	
12	Zalaegerszegi TE NKK	Relegation to Nemzeti Bajnokság I/B

== See also ==
- 2021 Magyar Kupa
