= 2016–17 Nemzeti Bajnokság I/A (women's basketball) =

Női NB I. A csoport
- Season: 2016–17
- Duration: September 30, 2016 - March 5, 2017 (regular season); April 6 – May 4, 2017 (playoffs)
- Games played: 100 (regular season)
- Teams: 10
- TV partner: M4 Sport

Finals
- Champions: UNIQA Sopron (11th title)
- Runners-up: Atomerőmű KSC Szekszárd
- Semifinalists: VBW CEKK Cegléd; CMB CARGO UNI GYÔR

Statistical leaders
Points	(United States) Jessica Kuster	17.45
Rebounds	(Serbia) Tina Jovanović	11.20
Assists	(Hungary) Dóra Medgyessy	8.95
Index Rating	(Hungary) Dóra Medgyessy	27.45

The 2016–17 Nemzeti Bajnokság I/A is the 80th season of the Nemzeti Bajnokság I/A, the highest tier professional basketball league in Hungary.

== Teams ==
Location of teams in 2016-17 Nemzeti Bajnokság I/A

The following 11 clubs compete in the NB I/A during the 2016–17 season. MTK-Budapest promoted as champions of the Division B, the second tier.

Team	Position 2015-16	City	Arena	Capacity
BEAC Újbuda	9th	Budapest	Gabányi László Sportcsarnok	400
Ceglédi EKK	6th	Cegléd	Gál János Sportcsarnok	1,200
Diósgyőri VTK	4th	Miskolc	Generali Aréna	1,688
UNI Győr	Runner-up	Győr	Egyetemi Csarnok	2,036
MTK-Budapest	1st (NB I/B)	Budapest	Városmajori Csarnok	400
PEAC-Pécs	5th	Pécs	Lauber Dezső Sportcsarnok	2,791
PINKK-Pécsi 424	Third place	Pécs	Gandhi-csarnok	300
UNIQA Sopron	Champion	Sopron	NOVOMATIC Aréna	2,500
KSC Szekszárd	7th	Szekszárd	Városi Sportcsarnok	1,100
Vasas Akadémia	10th	Budapest	Pasaréti Sportcentrum	300
Zalaegerszegi TE	8th	Zalaegerszeg	Városi Sportcsarnok	2,000

=== Personnel and kits ===
Team	Head coach	Team captain	Kit manufacturer	Shirt sponsor
BEAC Újbuda	(Hungary) Judit Balogh		Toti Sport	tippmixPro^{1}
Ceglédi EKK	(Hungary) László Cziczás		Toti Sport	VBW Hungary Kft.
Diósgyőri VTK	(Spain) Maikel López		Nike	Borsodi, tippmixPro^{1}
UNI Győr	(Hungary) Péter Völgyi		Spalding	CMB Cargo, tippmixPro^{1}
MTK-Budapest	(Hungary) László Cziegler		Spalding	tippmixPro^{1}
PEAC-Pécs	(Serbia) Boris Maljković		Spalding	tippmixPro^{1}, Pannonpower
PINKK Pécsi 424	(Hungary) Gábor Halmai		Toti Sport	tippmixPro^{1}, HR-Rent
UNIQA Sopron	(Hungary) László Sterbenz		Toti Sport	UNIQA
KSC Szekszárd	(Serbia) Željko Đokić		Toti Sport	tippmixPro^{1}, Tolle
Vasas Akadémia	(Serbia) Igor Skočovski		Toti Sport	MKB Euroleasing
Zalaegerszegi TE	(Hungary) Dávid Gáspár		Spalding	tippmixPro^{1}

==== Managerial changes ====
Team	Outgoing manager	Manner of departure	Date of vacancy	Position in table	Replaced by	Date of appointment
PINKK-Pécsi 424	(Hungary) Miklós Laczka	Resigned	28 November 2016	10th	(Hungary) Gábor Halmai	26 November 2016

== Regular season ==
Pos	Team	Pld	W	L	PF	PA	PD	Pts	Qualification
1	Atomerőmű KSC Szekszárd	20	17	3	1484	1190	+294	37	Playoffs
2	UNIQA Sopron	20	16	4	1671	1303	+368	36	Playoffs
3	CMB CARGO UNI GYÔR	20	15	5	1496	1303	+193	35	Playoffs
4	PEAC-Pécs	20	14	6	1473	1342	+131	34	Playoffs
5	VBW CEKK Cegléd	20	13	7	1549	1376	+173	33	Playoffs
6	Aluinvent DVTK Miskolc	20	13	7	1471	1241	+230	33	Playoffs
7	ZTE Női Kosárlabda Klub	20	9	11	1342	1401	−59	29	Playoffs
8	Vasas Akadémia	20	5	15	1224	1480	−256	25	Playoffs
9	PINKK-Pécsi 424	20	4	16	1231	1501	−270	24	Play-out
10	BEAC Újbuda	20	3	17	1243	1566	−323	23	Play-out
11	MTK-Budapest	20	1	19	1143	1624	−481	21	Play-out

Updated to match(es) played on 6 March 2017. Source: Kosarsport.hu
Rules for classification: 1) Games played; 2) Points; 3) Wins; 4) Defeats; 5) Points for; 6) Points against; 7) Victories/Defeats series; 8) in Home games; 9) as a Guest; 10) Last 5 matches.

=== Results ===
Home \ Away	BEAC	CEKK	DVTK	GYŐR	MTK	PEAC	PINK	SOP	SZEK	VAS	ZTE
BEAC Újbuda		68–88	61–91	33–58	70–54	68–69	81–68	67–98	60–96	63–69	49–72
Ceglédi EKK	79–58		67–57	70–68	93–69	90–66	87–56	58–64	55–61	79–65	90–63
Diósgyőri VTK	74–56	72–75		79–75	91–44	54–59	83–58	86–74	51–56	89–50	79–65
UNI Győr	93–68	89–69	63–64		76–50	83–75	73–64	88–79	62–67	87–71	76–52
MTK-Budapest	74–88	63–104	48–79	49–71		57–66	66–55	52–90	59–79	78–80	61–90
PEAC-Pécs	76–61	87–76	78–68	90–60	77–55		94–58	80–82	72–70	75–63	71–62
PINKK-Pécsi 424	74–64	68–83	54–85	61–81	72–56	54–62		67–80	63–81	72–57	63–71
UNIQA Sopron	105–72	90–68	62–50	75–85	110–51	69–54	107–55		79–53	95–52	72–52
KSC Szekszárd	78–52	73–70	83–67	56–58	100–56	64–56	72–52	77–56		81–57	89–58
Vasas SC	66–52	57–70	55–65	64–76	66–54	67–85	63–54	63–92	52–76		57–66
Zalaegerszegi TE	84–52	81–78	58–87	67–74	67–47	81–79	53–63	73–92	55–72	71–50	

Legend: Blue = home team win; Yellow = draw; Red = away team win.

== Playoffs ==
Teams in bold won the playoff series. Numbers to the left of each team indicate the team's original playoff seeding. Numbers to the right indicate the score of each playoff game.

Quarter-finals
1	**Atomerőmű KSC Szekszárd**	**2**
8	Vasas Akadémia	0
4	PEAC-Pécs	1
5	**VBW CEKK Cegléd**	**2**
2	**UNIQA Sopron**	**2**
7	ZTE Női Kosárlabda Klub	0
3	**CMB CARGO UNI GYÔR**	**2**
6	Aluinvent DVTK Miskolc	1

Semi-finals
1	**Atomerőmű KSC Szekszárd**	**2**
5	VBW CEKK Cegléd	0
2	**UNIQA Sopron**	**2**
3	CMB CARGO UNI GYÔR	0

Finals
1	Atomerőmű KSC Szekszárd	1
2	**UNIQA Sopron**	**3**
Third place
3	CMB CARGO UNI GYÔR	1
5	**VBW CEKK Cegléd**	**2**

=== Quarter-finals ===
In the quarterfinals, teams playing against each other had to win two games to win the series. Thus, if one team wins two games before all three games have been played, the games that remain are omitted. The team that finished in the higher regular season place, played the first and the third (if it was necessary) games of the series at home.

Team 1	Agg.	Team 2	Game 1	Game 2	Game 3
**Atomerőmű KSC Szekszárd**	2–0	Vasas Akadémia	102–37	85–51	—
**UNIQA Sopron**	2–0	ZTE Női Kosárlabda Klub	77–47	75–60	—
**CMB CARGO UNI GYÔR**	2–1	Aluinvent DVTK Miskolc	74–57	68–69	74–73
PEAC-Pécs	1–2	**VBW CEKK Cegléd**	82–76	56–66	43–53

=== Semi-finals ===
In the semifinals, teams playing against each other had to win two games to win the series. Thus, if one team wins two games before all three games have been played, the games that remain are omitted. The team that finished in the higher regular season place, played the first and the third (if it was necessary) games of the series at home.

Team 1	Agg.	Team 2	Game 1	Game 2	Game 3
**Atomerőmű KSC Szekszárd**	2–0	VBW CEKK Cegléd	82–58	74–67	—
**UNIQA Sopron**	2–0	ZTE Női Kosárlabda Klub	80–53	83–65	—

=== Finals ===
In the finals, teams playing against each other had to win three games to win the title. Thus, if one team won three games before all five games were played, the remaining games were omitted. The team that finished in the higher regular season place, played the first, the third, and the fifth (if it was necessary) games of the series at home.

Team 1	Agg.	Team 2	Game 1	Game 2	Game 3	Game 4	Game 5
Atomerőmű KSC Szekszárd	1–3	**UNIQA Sopron**	45–61	62–66	77–73	56–82	—

==== Game 1 ====
25 April 2017	Atomerőmű KSC Szekszárd	45–**61** (Series: **0–1**)	**UNIQA Sopron**	Szekszárd
20:30 (CEST)	Scoring by quarter: 12–**20**, 13–**16**, 8–**10**, 12–**15**
	Pts: Lisec 15; Rebs: Lisec 10; Asts: Á. Studer 4 PIR: Piršić 17	Report	Pts: Johnson 15; Rebs: George 8 Asts: Turner 5 PIR: Fegyverneky 20	Arena: Városi Sportcsarnok; Attendance: 1,000; Referees: Cs. Cziffra, P. Papp, P. Praksch, (Zs. Hartyáni)

==== Game 2 ====
28 April 2017	**UNIQA Sopron**	**66**–62 (Series: **2–0**)	Atomerőmű KSC Szekszárd	Sopron
18:00 (CEST)	Scoring by quarter: 18–**19**, **18**–17, **22**–13, 8–**13**
	Pts: Turner 18; Rebs: George, Krnjić 9 Asts: Turner 8 PIR: Turner 28	Report	Pts: Bálint 14; Rebs: Lisec 8 Asts: Á. Studer 7 PIR: Theodorean 19	Arena: NOVOMATIC Aréna; Attendance: 1,200; Referees: G. Kapitány, T. Benczur, Sz. Gorka, (L. Fekete)

==== Game 3 ====
1 May 2017	**Atomerőmű KSC Szekszárd**	**77**–73(OT) (Series: **1–2**)	UNIQA Sopron	Szekszárd
19:00 (CEST)	Scoring by quarter: **23**–7, 14–**27**, 10–**15**, **13**–11, Overtime: **17**–13
	Pts: Lisec 27; Rebs: Piršić 12; Asts: Erkić, Á. Studer 5 PIR: Lisec 28	Report	Pts: Johnson 19; Rebs: Johnson, Fegyverneky 7 Asts: Fegyverneky 4 PIR: Johnson 25	Arena: Városi Sportcsarnok; Attendance: 800; Referees: T. Földházi, P. Frányó, D. Tőzsér, (K. Páli)

==== Game 4 ====
4 May 2017	**UNIQA Sopron**	**82**–56 (Series: **3–1**)	Atomerőmű KSC Szekszárd	Sopron
17:00 (CEST)	Scoring by quarter: **21**–13, **19**–18, **18**–14, **22**–11
	Pts: Crvendakić 19; Rebs: Johnson, George 8 Asts: Johnson 5 PIR: Crvendakić 22	Report	Pts: Lisec, Erkić 12; Rebs: Lisec 10; Asts: four players 2 PIR: Lisec 18	Arena: NOVOMATIC Aréna; Attendance: 1,600; Referees: T. Benczur, P. Győrffy, P. Praksch, (Zs. Várhalmi)

UNIQA Sopron won the FINAL series.

2016–17 Nemzeti Bajnokság I/A
Champion

**11th title**

=== Third place ===
In the series for the third place, teams playing against each other had to win two games to win the 3rd place in the final rankings of the season. Thus, if one team won two games before all three games had been played, the remaining games were omitted. The team that finished in the higher regular season place, played the first and the third (if it was necessary) games of the series at home.

Team 1	Agg.	Team 2	Game 1	Game 2	Game 3
CMB CARGO UNI GYÔR	1–2	**VBW CEKK Cegléd**	91–64	60–66	69–77

== Playout ==
Pos	Team	Pld	W	L	PF	PA	PD	Pts	Qualification or relegation
9	BEAC Újbuda	24	6	18	0	0	0	30	
10	PINKK-Pécsi 424	24	6	18	0	0	0	30	
11	MTK-Budapest	24	2	22	0	0	0	26	Relegation to Nemzeti Bajnokság I/B

Updated to match(es) played on 28 April 2017. Source: Kosarsport.hu
Rules for classification: 1) Games played; 2) Points; 3) Wins; 4) Defeats; 5) Points for; 6) Points against; 7) Victories/Defeats series; 8) in Home games; 9) as a Guest; 10) Last 5 matches.

=== Results ===
Home \ Away	BEAC	MTK	PINK
BEAC Újbuda		71–62	66–53
MTK-Budapest	49–60		71–62
PINKK-Pécsi 424	69–65	71–70	

Legend: Blue = home team win; Yellow = draw; Red = away team win.

== Final standings ==
Pos	Team	Qualification or Relegation
1st place, gold medalist(s)	UNIQA Sopron	Qualification to the EuroLeague
2nd place, silver medalist(s)	Atomerőmű KSC Szekszárd	Qualification to the EuroLeague
3rd place, bronze medalist(s)	VBW CEKK Cegléd	Qualification to the EuroCup
4	CMB CARGO UNI GYÔR	Qualification to the EuroCup
5	Aluinvent DVTK Miskolc	Qualification to the EuroCup
6	PEAC-Pécs	Qualification to the EuroCup
7	ZTE Női Kosárlabda Klub	
8	Vasas Akadémia	
9	BEAC Újbuda	
10	PINKK-Pécsi 424	
11	MTK-Budapest	Relegation to Nemzeti Bajnokság I/B

== See also ==
- 2017 Magyar Kupa
