= 2021–22 Nemzeti Bajnokság I/A (women's basketball) =

Hungarian basketball league season

Tippmix Női NB I/A^{1}
- Season: 2021–22
- Dates: 25 September 2021 – 23 April 2022
- Teams: 14
- TV partner: M4 Sport

Regular season
- Top seed: Sopron Basket

Finals
- Champions: Sopron Basket (15th title)
- Runners-up: Atomerőmű KSC Szekszárd
- Third place: DVTK
- Fourth place: NKA Universitas PEAC
- All statistics correct as of complete.^{1} Sponsored league name, referring to Tippmix.

The 2021–22 Nemzeti Bajnokság I/A season, also known as Tippmix Női NB I/A for sponsorship reasons, was the 85th season of the Nemzeti Bajnokság I/A, the highest professional basketball league in Hungary. Falco Vulcano were the defending champions, but Sopron Basket eventually became champions, winning their 15th league title. It started on 25 September 2021, with the first round of the regular season, and ended on 23 April 2022, with the last game of the finals.

== Regular season ==
=== League table ===
Pos	Team	Pld	W	L	PF	PA	PD	Pts	Qualification
1	Sopron Basket	22	21	1	1818	1221	+597	43	Advance to playoffs
2	Atomerőmű KSC Szekszárd	22	19	3	1801	1429	+372	41	Advance to playoffs
3	NKA Universitas PEAC	22	15	7	1599	1523	+76	37	Advance to playoffs
4	UNI Győr MÉLY-ÚT	22	15	7	1695	1509	+186	37	Advance to playoffs
5	DVTK	22	14	8	1646	1435	+211	36	Advance to playoffs
6	Ludovika-FCSM Csata	22	12	10	1633	1584	+49	34	Advance to playoffs
7	Vasas Akadémia	22	10	12	1427	1473	−46	32	Advance to playoffs
8	TFSE-MTK	22	9	13	1478	1660	−182	31	Advance to playoffs
9	ELTE BEAC Újbuda	22	9	13	1460	1564	−104	31	Qualification for Relegation round
10	VBW CEKK Cegléd	22	4	18	1365	1669	−304	26	Qualification for Relegation round
11	BKG-PRIMA Szigetszentmiklós	22	2	20	1409	1728	−319	24	Qualification for Relegation round
12	PINKK-Pécsi 424	22	2	20	1307	1843	−536	24	Qualification for Relegation round

Updated to match(es) played on 20 March 2022. Source: Kosarsport.hu
Rules for classification: 1) Games played; 2) Points; 3) Wins; 4) Defeats; 5) Points scored; 6) Points against; 7) Victories/Defeats series; 8) in Home games; 9) as a Guest; 10) Last 5 matches.

== Playoffs ==
Quarterfinals semifinals and the third place series were played in a best-of-three format, the finals were played in a best-of-five format. The higher seeded team playing the first, third and fifth (if it was necessary) game at home.

Quarterfinals
1	Sopron Basket	2
8	TFSE-MTK	0
4	UNI Győr MÉLY-ÚT	0
5	DVTK	2
2	Atomerőmű KSC Szekszárd	2
7	Vasas Akadémia	0
3	NKA Universitas PEAC	2
6	Ludovika-FCSM Csata	0

Semifinals
1	Sopron Basket	2
5	DVTK	1
2	Atomerőmű KSC Szekszárd	2
3	NKA Universitas PEAC	1

Finals
1	Sopron Basket	3
2	Atomerőmű KSC Szekszárd	0
Third place
3	NKA Universitas PEAC	1
5	DVTK	2

=== Quarterfinals ===
Team 1	Series	Team 2	Game 1	Game 2	Game 3
Sopron Basket	2–0	TFSE-MTK	95–34	93–45	–
Atomerőmű KSC Szekszárd	2–0	Vasas Akadémia	89–71	88–55	–
NKA Universitas PEAC	2–0	Ludovika-FCSM Csata	81–50	84–58	–
UNI Győr MÉLY-ÚT	0–2	DVTK	73–77	63–75	–

=== Semifinals ===
Team 1	Series	Team 2	Game 1	Game 2	Game 3
Sopron Basket	2–1	DVTK	68–49	60–66	86–52
Atomerőmű KSC Szekszárd	2–1	NKA Universitas PEAC	81–67	65–76	75–54

=== Third place series ===
Team 1	Series	Team 2	Game 1	Game 2	Game 3
NKA Universitas PEAC	1–2	DVTK	77–63	57–58	56–73

=== Finals ===
Team 1	Series	Team 2	Game 1	Game 2	Game 3	Game 4	Game 5
Sopron Basket	3–0	Atomerőmű KSC Szekszárd	73–71	66–62	74–52	–	–

==== Game 1 ====
16 April 2022	Sopron Basket	73–71 (Series: 1–0)	Atomerőmű KSC Szekszárd	Sopron
19:30 (CEST)	Scoring by quarter: 18–13, 23–15, 20–28, 12–15
	Pts: Határ 17; Rebs: Határ 10; Asts: January, Brooks 5 PIR: Határ 26	Report	Pts: Milić 22; Rebs: Milić 9 Asts: Studer 8 PIR: Milić 31	Arena: NOVOMATIC Aréna; Attendance: 1,200; Referees: Gellért Kapitány, Dénes Kelemen Tőzsér, Katalin Varga-Záray

==== Game 2 ====
20 April 2022	Atomerőmű KSC Szekszárd	62–66 (Series: 0–2)	Sopron Basket	Szekszárd
18:00 (CEST)	Scoring by quarter: 15–13, 16–21, 17–17, 14–15
	Pts: Goree 18; Rebs: Milić 9 Asts: Studer 6 PIR: Goree, Milić 19	Report	Pts: Williams 20; Rebs: Williams, Határ 8 Asts: Fegyverneky 5 PIR: Williams 32	Arena: Városi Sportcsarnok; Attendance: 1,270; Referees: Csaba Zsolt Cziffra, Péter Árpád Praksch, Márton Makrai

==== Game 3 ====
23 April 2022	Sopron Basket	74–52 (Series: 3–0)	Atomerőmű KSC Szekszárd	Sopron
14:30 (CEST)	Scoring by quarter: 29–14, 21–14, 15–15, 9–9
	Pts: Brooks 24; Rebs: Brooks 8 Asts: Brooks 4 PIR: Brooks 36	Report	Pts: Milić 17; Rebs: Milić 13; Asts: Studer 6 PIR: Milić 25	Arena: NOVOMATIC Aréna; Attendance: 2,000; Referees: Tamás Péter Földházi, Cecília Tóth, Dr. Balázs Mészáros

== Final standings ==
Pos	Team	Pld	W	L	Qualification or relegation
1	Sopron Basket (C)	30	28	2	Qualification to EuroLeague regular season
2	Atomerőmű KSC Szekszárd	30	23	7	Qualification to EuroLeague regular season
3	NKA Universitas PEAC	30	19	11	Qualification to EuroLeague qualifying rounds
4	UNI Győr MÉLY-ÚT	28	19	9	Qualification to EuroCup second qualifying round
5	DVTK	30	19	11	Qualification to EuroCup second qualifying round
6	Ludovika-FCSM Csata	22	12	10	Qualification to EuroCup first qualifying round
7	Vasas Akadémia	22	10	12	
8	TFSE-MTK	22	9	13	
9	ELTE BEAC Újbuda	22	9	13	
10	VBW CEKK Cegléd	22	4	18	
11	BKG-PRIMA Szigetszentmiklós	22	2	20	
12	PINKK-Pécsi 424	22	2	20	

Source: MKOSZ
(C) Champions

== Statistics ==
=== Number of teams by counties and regions ===
Number of teams by counties
Pos.	County (megye)	No. of teams	Teams
1	Budapest	4	ELTE BEAC Újbuda, NKE-Csata, TFSE-MTK and Vasas Akadémia
2	Baranya	2	NKA Universitas PEAC and PINKK-Pécsi 424
2	Győr-Moson-Sopron	2	Sopron Basket and UNI Győr
2	Pest	2	BKG-PRIMA Akadémia and Ceglédi EKK
5	Borsod-Abaúj-Zemplén	1	DVTK
5	Tolna	1	KSC Szekszárd

Number of teams by regions
Transdanubia	Central Hungary	Great Plain and North
NKA Universitas PEAC; PINKK-Pécsi 424; Sopron Basket; KSC Szekszárd; UNI Győr	BKG-PRIMA Akadémia; Ceglédi EKK; ELTE BEAC Újbuda; NKE-Csata; TFSE-MTK; Vasas Akadémia	DVTK
5 Team	6 Team	1 Team

== Hungarian clubs in European competitions ==
	Competition	Team	Progress	Result	Total W–L
FIBA					
FIBA	EuroLeague	Sopron Basket	Final	vs (Turkey) Fenerbahçe (W)	12-6
FIBA	EuroLeague	Sopron Basket	Semifinal	vs (Spain) Perfumerías Avenida (W)	12-6
FIBA	EuroLeague	Sopron Basket	Quarter-finals	vs (France) BLMA (W)	12-6
FIBA	EuroLeague	Sopron Basket	Regular season	2nd of 8 teams (8-6)	12-6
FIBA	EuroLeague	KSC Szekszárd	Regular season	8th of 8 teams (0-14) transfer to EuroCup	2-14
FIBA	EuroLeague	KSC Szekszárd	Qualifying round	1st of 3 teams (2-0)	2-14
FIBA	EuroCup	KSC Szekszárd	Quarter-finals	transfer from EuroLeague vs (Turkey) Galatasaray (L)	0-2
FIBA	EuroCup	UNI Győr	Regular season	4th of 4 teams (2-4)	2-4
FIBA	EuroCup	DVTK	Play-off Round 1	vs (Czech Republic) Žabiny Brno (L)	4-4
FIBA	EuroCup	DVTK	Regular season	1st of 4 teams (4-2)	4-4
FIBA	EuroCup	Ludovika-FCSM Csata	Regular season	4th of 4 teams (1-5)	3-5
FIBA	EuroCup	Ludovika-FCSM Csata	Qualification round	vs (Sweden) A3 Basket Umeå (W)	3-5
FIBA	EuroCup	NKA Universitas PEAC	Play-off Round 1	vs (Turkey) Nesibe Aydın (L)	5-5
FIBA	EuroCup	NKA Universitas PEAC	Regular season	3rd of 4 teams (3-3)	5-5
FIBA	EuroCup	NKA Universitas PEAC	Qualification round	vs (Greece) Niki Lefkadas (W)	5-5

== See also ==
- 2022 Magyar Kupa – 64th season of the Hungarian Basketball Cup
