= 2019 Magyar Kupa (women's basketball) =

62nd season of the Hungarian Basketball Cup

2019 Killik László Magyar Kupa
Tournament details
- Arena: City Hall University; Győr, Hungary
- Dates: 28 February–2 March

Final positions
- Champions: Sopron Basket (8th title)
- Runners-up: Atomerőmű KSC Szekszárd
- Third place: Aluinvent DVTK Miskolc
- Fourth place: ZTE NKK

Awards and statistics
- MVP: (Hungary) Zsófia Fegyverneky
- Top scorer(s): (United States) Yvonne Turner

The 2019 László Killik Női Magyar Kupa is the 62nd season of the Hungarian Basketball Cup.

== Qualification ==
Eight highest ranked teams after the first half of the 2018–19 NB I/A regular season qualified to the tournament.

1. Sopron Basket
2. Aluinvent DVTK
3. ZTE Női Kosárlabda Klub
4. Atomerőmű KSC Szekszárd
5. PEAC-Pécs
6. CMB CARGO UNI GYÔR
7. NKE-Csata
8. ELTE BEAC Újbuda

== Bracket ==
Quarterfinals; February 28
ZTE NKK	76
ELTE BEAC Újbuda	63
NKE-FCSM Csata	54
Atomerőmű KSC Szekszárd	84
CMB CARGO UNI GYÔR	55
Sopron Basket	69
PEAC-Pécs	81
Aluinvent DVTK	87

Semifinals; March 1
ZTE NKK	64
Atomerőmű KSC Szekszárd	74
Sopron Basket	72
Aluinvent DVTK	51

Final; March 2
Atomerőmű KSC Szekszárd	72
Sopron Basket	81
Third place
ZTE NKK	59
Aluinvent DVTK	79

=== Semifinals ===
1 March Semifinal I	ZTE NKK	64–74	Atomerőmű KSC Szekszárd	Győr
15:30 (CET)	Scoring by quarter: 23–20, 13–23, 19–21, 9–10
	Pts: Maltsi 27; Rebs: Horti 7 PIR: Maltsi 34	Boxscore	Pts: Bishop 18; Rebs: Eldebrink 9 PIR: Bishop 27	Arena: University Hall; Attendance: 200; Referees: P. Papp, P. Frányó, B. Mészáros, (Sz. Gorka)

1 March Semifinal II	Sopron Basket	72–51	Aluinvent DVTK Miskolc	Győr
18:00 (CET)	Scoring by quarter: 18–19, 12–8, 19–7, 23–17
	Pts: Dupree 14; Rebs: Crvendakić 9 PIR: Dupree, Turner 18	Boxscore	Pts: Mokango, Škorić 13; Rebs: Mokango 10; PIR: Mokango 22	Arena: University Hall; Attendance: 600; Referees: G. Kapitány, P. Praksch, C. Tóth, (K. Páli)

=== Bronze match ===
2 March Bronze match	Aluinvent DVTK Miskolc	79–59	ZTE NKK	Győr
14:30 (CET)	Scoring by quarter: 20–12, 18–19, 23–13, 18–15
	Pts: Medgyessy 22; Rebs: Mokango, Kiss 5 PIR: Medgyessy 40	Boxscore	Pts: Hegedüs-Őri 13; Rebs: Horti 6 PIR: Hegedüs-Őri 16	Arena: University Hall; Attendance: 300; Referees: P. Győrffy, D. Tőzsér, B. Csabai-Kaskötő, (L. Fekete)

=== Final ===
2 March Final	Sopron Basket	81–72	Atomerőmű KSC Szekszárd	Győr
17:05 (CET)	Scoring by quarter: 20–11, 19–17, 18–11, 24–33
	Pts: Turner 20; Rebs: Crvendakić 8 PIR: Turner 31	Boxscore	Pts: McCall 19; Rebs: McCall 11; PIR: McCall 32	Arena: University Hall; Attendance: 1,300; Referees: T. Földházi, Cs. Cziffra, J. Ádám, (I. Bodrogváry)

Starters:			Pts	Reb	Ast
G	22	(United States) Yvonne Turner	20	4	
SG	4	(Hungary) Zsófia Fegyverneky	17	2	
F	11	(Serbia) Aleksandra Crvendakić	7	8	
PF	13	(United States) Candice Dupree	13	1	
C	14	(Hungary) Bernadett Határ	8	4	
Reserves:					
SF	41	(Hungary) Debóra Dubei	5	1	0
PF		(Serbia) Tina Jovanović	7	7	0
PF	17	(Sweden) Amanda Zahui B.	4	2	0
G	10	(Hungary) Katalin Honti	DNP		
SF	12	(Hungary) Dalma Czukor	DNP		
PG	13	(Hungary) Kamilla Varga	DNP		
SG	9	(Hungary) Virág Weninger	DNP		
Head coach:
(Spain) Roberto Íñiguez

Sopron	Szekszárd

Sopron	Statistics	Szekszárd
26/49 (52%)	2 point field goals	16/33 (48%)
1/6 (17%)	3 point field goals	7/25 (28%)
26/34 (76%)	Free throws	19/20 (95%)
29	Rebounds	28
	Assists	
	Steals	
	Turnovers	
2	Blocks	2
21 (28)	Fouls	28 (21)

2019 Magyar Kupa Winners
Sopron Basket
8th title
MVP
(Hungary) Zsófia Fegyverneky

Starters:			Pts	Reb	Ast
G	18	(Croatia) Ivana Dojkić	7	3	
G	6	(Sweden) Frida Eldebrink	14	0	
SF	10	(Hungary) Lívia Gereben	0	2	
F	5	(Australia) Abby Bishop	15	9	
C	24	(United States) Erica McCall	19	11	
Reserves:					
PG	9	(Hungary) Ágnes Studer	12	2	0
SF	3	(Hungary) Alexandra Theodoreán	3	1	
F	13	(Hungary) Bálint Réka	2	0	
C	2	(Hungary) Virág Kiss	DNP		
G	4	(Hungary) Zsuzsa Studer	DNP		
PF	12	(Hungary) Manty Mansaré	DNP		
F	21	(Hungary) Nikolett Vicze	DNP		
Head coach:
(Serbia) Željko Đokić

==== Final standings ====
	Team
Hungarian Cup	Sopron Basket
Silver medal	Atomerőmű KSC Szekszárd
Bronze medal	Aluinvent DVTK Miskolc
4.	20px ZTE NKK
5.	ELTE BEAC Újbuda
5.	NKE-FCSM Csata
5.	CMB CARGO UNI GYÔR
5.	PEAC-Pécs

== See also ==
- 2018–19 Nemzeti Bajnokság I/A
