= Nemzeti Bajnokság I/A (women's basketball) =

Hungarian sports league

Hungarian national championship for women's
- Current season, competition or edition: 2025–26 Nemzeti Bajnokság I/A (women's basketball)
- Sport: Basketball
- Founded: 1933
- First season: 1933
- No. of teams: 12
- Country: Hungary Hungary
- Continent: FIBA Europe (Europe)
- Most recent champion: Sopron Basket (16th title)
- Most titles: BSE Budapest (21 titles)
- Website: kosarsport.hu

The Hungarian national championship for women's (English: National Championship I/A, commonly abbreviated NB I/A) is the top professional league for women's basketball in Hungary, organized and supervised by the Magyar Kosárlabdázók Országos Szövetsége.

== Clubs of the 2020–21 season ==
Location of teams in 2020-21 Nemzeti Bajnokság I/A

Team	City	Arena	Capacity
ELTE BEAC Újbuda	Budapest	Gabányi László Sportcsarnok	400
VBW CEKK Cegléd	Cegléd	Gál János Sportcsarnok	1,200
Ludovika-FCSM Csata	Budapest	Ludovika Aréna	1,500
Aluinvent DVTK	Miskolc	Generali Aréna	1,688
Uni Győr MÉLY-ÚT	Győr	Egyetemi Csarnok	1,378
TFSE-MTK	Budapest	Városmajori Csarnok	400
PEAC-Pécs	Pécs	Lauber Dezső Sportcsarnok	2,791
PINKK-Pécsi 424	Pécs	Gandhi-csarnok	300
Sopron Basket	Sopron	Novomatic Aréna	2,200
Atomerőmű KSC Szekszárd	Szekszárd	City Sports Hall	1,100
Vasas Akadémia	Budapest	Pasaréti Sportcentrum	300
Zalaegerszegi TE NKK	Zalaegerszeg	Városi Sportcsarnok	2,000

== List of champions ==
Season	Winner	Result	Runner-up
1933	TFSE	Not held Play off	
1939	TFSE	Not held Play off	
1939–40	BSZKRT SE	Not held Play off	
1940–41	Gamma SE	Not held Play off	
1941–42	TFSE	Not held Play off	
1943	Nagykovácsi Áruház	Not held Play off	
1944	TFSE	Not held Play off	
1945	IX Madisz Dózsa	Not held Play off	
1945–46	IX Madisz Dózsa	Not held Play off	
1946–47	Közalkalmazottak SE	Not held Play off	
1947–48	Közalkalmazottak SE	Not held Play off	
1948–49	Közalkalmazottak SE	Not held Play off	
1949–50	Közalkalmazottak SE	Not held Play off	
1950	Közalkalmazottak SE		
1951	Budapesti Petőfi		
1952	Budapesti Petőfi		
1953	Budapesti Vörös Lobogó		
1954	Budapesti Petőfi		
1955	Budapesti Petőfi		
1956	Budapesti Vörös Lobogó		
1957	Budapesti Petőfi		
1957–58	Budapesti Vörös Meteor		
1958–59	Budapesti Petőfi		
1959–60	Budapesti Petőfi		
1960–61	Budapesti Vörös Meteor		
1961–62	MTK Budapest		
1962–63	MTK Budapest		
1964	MTK Budapest		
1965	MTK Budapest		
1966	MTK Budapest		
1967	Budapesti VTSK		
1968	MTK Budapest		
1969	MTK Budapest		
1970	MTK Budapest		
1971	TFSE		
1972	MTK Budapest		
1973	BSE Budapest		
1974	BSE Budapest		
1975	Budapesti Spartacus		
1976	Budapesti Spartacus		
1977	BSE Budapest		
1978	BSE Budapest		
1979	BSE Budapest		
1980–81	BSE Budapest		
1981–82	Budapesti Spartacus		
1982–83	Tungsram Budapest		
1983–84	Tungsram Budapest		
1984–85	Tungsram Budapest		
1985–86	BSE Budapest		
1986–87	Tungsram Budapest		
1987–88	BSE Budapest		
1988–89	MTK Budapest		
1989–90	BEAC Budapest		
1990–91	MTK Budapest		
1991–92	Pécsi VSK		
1992–93	Gysev Sopron		
1993–94	Tungsram Budapest		
1994–95	Pécsi VSK Dália		
1995–96	Pécsi VSK Dália		
1996–97	Ferencvárosi TC		
1997–98	Pécsi VSK Dália		
1998–99	Gysev Sopron		
1999–00	Mizo Pécsi VSK		
2000–01	Mizo Pécsi VSK		
2001–02	Gysev Sopron		
2002–03	Mizo Pécsi VSK		
2003–04	Mizo Pécsi VSK		
2004–05	Mizo Pécsi VSK		
2005–06	Mizo Pécs		
2006–07	MKB Euroleasing Sopron		
2007–08	MKB Euroleasing Sopron		
2008–09	MKB Euroleasing Sopron		
2009–10	Pécs 2010		
2010–11	MKB Sopron		
2011–12	Seat Győr		
2012–13	UNIQA Euroleasing Sopron		
2013–14	PINKK-Pécsi 424		
2014–15	UNIQA Euroleasing Sopron		
2015–16	UNIQA Sopron	3–0	CMB CARGO UNI Győr
2016–17	UNIQA Sopron	3–1	Atomerőmű KSC Szekszárd
2017–18	Sopron Basket	3–0	Atomerőmű KSC Szekszárd
2018–19	Sopron Basket	3–0	Aluinvent DVTK
2019–20	season was abandoned due to the COVID-19 pandemic		
2020–21	Sopron Basket	3–1	Atomerőmű KSC Szekszárd
2021-22	Sopron Basket	3–0	Atomerőmű KSC Szekszárd
2022-23	Sopron Basket	3–0	SERCO UNI Győr

== Selected foreign players ==
The following list contains players who played in the WNBA and/or achieved a medal on a major international tournament such as Olympic Games and World Championship or significantly contributed to the development of the league.

- (Australia) Allison Tranquilli
- (Australia) Jenny Whittle
- (Australia) Hanna Zavecz
- (Cuba) Liset Castillo
- (Jamaica) Simone Edwards
- (Latvia) Zane Tamane
- (Lithuania) Jolanta Vilutytė
- (Bulgaria) Albena Branzova
- (Russia) Yekaterina Lisina
- (Russia) Maria Stepanova
- (Serbia) Aleksandra Crvendakić
- (Serbia) Sara Krnjić
- (Serbia) Jelena Milovanović
- (Serbia) Dragana Stanković
- (Serbia) Slobodanka Tuvić
- (Spain) Lucila Pascua
- (United States) Essence Carson
- (United States) Kelsey Griffin
- (United States) (France) Bria Hartley
- (United States) Quanitra Hollingsworth
- (United States) Amber Holt
- (United States) Briann January
- (United States) Vickie Johnson
- (United States) Brianna Kiesel
- (United States) Kelly Mazzante
- (United States) Kayla McBride
- (United States) Erica McCall
- (United States) Angel McCoughtry
- (United States) Beatrice Mompremier
- (United States) Nicole Ohlde
- (United States) Abi Olajuwon
- (United States) (Serbia) Danielle Page
- (United States) (Hungary) Allie Quigley
- (United States) Megan Walker
- (United States) (France) Gabby Williams
