= 2019–20 EuroCup Women =

EuroCup Women
- Season: 2019–20
- Dates: 26 September 2019 – 15 April 2020

The 2019–20 EuroCup Women was the eighteenth edition of FIBA Europe's second-tier international competition for women's basketball clubs under such name.

On 16 June 2020, FIBA Europe announced the season was declared void and would not be finished due to the COVID-19 pandemic.

== Teams ==
Teams were confirmed by FIBA Europe on 17 June 2019.

Quarterfinals
(Italy) Reyer Venezia (EL RS)	(Belgium) Castors Braine (EL RS)	(Russia) Dynamo Kursk (EL RS)	(Spain) Spar Citylift Girona (EL RS)
Regular season
Conference 1		Conference 2	
(Turkey) Botaş SK (EL Q)	(Poland) AZS AJP Gorzów Wielkopolski (2nd)	(Greece) Olympiacos (EL Q)	(Spain) AE Sedis Bàsquet (3rd)
(Russia) PBC MBA Moscow (4th)	(Poland) Artego Bydgoszcz (6th)	(Hungary) Aluinvent DVTK Miskolc (EL Q)	(Spain) Valencia BC (4th)
(Russia) Sparta&K M.R. Vidnoje (6th)	(Slovakia) MBK Ružomberok (1st)	(France) Flammes Carolo Basket (4th)	(Spain) Lointek Gernika Bizkaia (5th)
(Russia) Enisey Krasnoyarsk (7th)	(Sweden) A3 Basket Umeå (1st)	(France) Roche Vendée Basket (5th)	(Belgium) Basket Hema SKW (2nd)
(Turkey) Galatasaray (4th)	(Sweden) Luleå Basket (5th)	(France) Basket Landes (6th)	(Belgium) Basket Namur Capitale (3rd)
(Turkey) Hatay BB (5th)	(Romania) ACS Sepsi SIC (1st)	(Hungary) UNI Győr Mély-Út (4th)	(Belgium) VOO Liège Panthers (5th)
(Turkey) Beşiktaş (7th)	(Israel) Neve David Ramla (1st)	(Hungary) Atomerőmű KSC Szekszárd (5th)	(Germany) Herner TC (1st)
(Turkey) Orman Gençlik (8th)	(Belarus) Tsmoki-Minsk (1st)	(Hungary) PEAC-Pécs (6th)	(Germany) Rutronik Stars Keltern (2nd)
(Czech Republic) KP Brno (3rd)	(Kosovo) BC Prishtina (1st)	(Hungary) VBW CEKK Cegléd (8th)	(Switzerland) BCF Elfic Fribourg (1st)
(Poland) CCC Polkowice (1st)		(Spain) CB Avenida (2nd)	(Portugal) Olivais Futebol Clube (1st)
Qualification round
Conference 1		Conference 2	
(Russia) Spartak Noginsk (9th)	(Turkey) Kayseri Basketbol (10th)		

== Schedule ==
Phase	Round	Round date
Qualifying round	First leg	26 September 2019
Qualifying round	Second leg	3 October 2019
Regular season	Matchday 1	16–17 October 2019
Regular season	Matchday 2	23–24 October 2019
Regular season	Matchday 3	30–31 October 2019
Regular season	Matchday 4	6–7 November 2019
Regular season	Matchday 5	27–28 November 2019
Regular season	Matchday 6	4–5 December 2019
Play-off Round 1	First leg	18–19 December 2019
Play-off Round 1	Second leg	8–9 January 2020
Round of 16	First leg	22–23 January 2020
Round of 16	Second leg	28–29 January 2020
Round of 8	First leg	19–20 February 2020
Round of 8	Second leg	26–27 February 2020
Quarterfinals	First leg	10–12 March 2020
Quarterfinals	Second leg	19 March 2020
Semifinals	First leg	26 March 2020
Semifinals	Second leg	2 April 2020
Final	First leg	8 April 2020
Final	Second leg	15 April 2020

== Qualification round ==
Team 1	Agg.	Team 2	1st leg	2nd leg
Spartak Noginsk (Russia)	138–163	(Turkey) Kayseri Basketbol	67–81	71–82

== Group stage ==
Draw for the group stage was made on 23 July 2019 in Munich, Germany.

=== Conference 1 ===
==== Group A ====
Pos	Team	Pld	W	L	PF	PA	PD	Pts	Qualification	GOR	BOT	RAM	BRN
1	(Poland) InvestInTheWest ENEA Gorzów	6	3	3	473	410	+63	9	Play-off Round 1	—	72–67	88–95	93–57
2	(Turkey) Botaş SK	6	3	3	448	432	+16	9	Play-off Round 1	49–83	—	91–64	75–80
3	(Israel) Ramla	6	3	3	449	462	−13	9		71–70	70–78	—	80–63
4	(Czech Republic) KP Brno	6	3	3	406	472	−66	9		71–67	63–88	72–69	—

Source: FIBA
Rules for classification: 1) Points; 2) Head-to-head record; 3) Head-to-head point differential; 4) General point differential; 5) Points scored.

==== Group B ====
Pos	Team	Pld	W	L	PF	PA	PD	Pts	Qualification	MBA	SPA	BES	PRI
1	(Russia) MBA Moscow	6	5	1	506	397	+109	11	Round of 16	—	62–60	97–76	90–58
2	(Russia) Sparta & K	6	4	2	556	400	+156	10	Play-off Round 1	80–60	—	80–71	115–42
3	(Turkey) Beşiktaş TRC İnşaat	6	3	3	523	478	+45	9	Play-off Round 1	81–96	102–95	—	98–52
4	(Kosovo) Mabetex Prishtina	6	0	6	315	625	−310	6		42–101	63–126	58–95	—

Source: FIBA
Rules for classification: 1) Points; 2) Head-to-head record; 3) Head-to-head point differential; 4) General point differential; 5) Points scored.

==== Group C ====
Pos	Team	Pld	W	L	PF	PA	PD	Pts	Qualification	ORM	POL	KAY	UME
1	(Turkey) Orman Gençlik	6	5	1	508	409	+99	11	Round of 16	—	89–85	69–62	99–59
2	(Poland) CCC Polkowice	6	4	2	462	398	+64	10	Play-off Round 1	75–55	—	59–64	83–70
3	(Turkey) Bellona Kayseri Basketbol	6	3	3	394	429	−35	9		63–87	54–69	—	68–65
4	(Sweden) A3 Basket Umeå	6	0	6	405	533	−128	6		65–109	66–91	80–83	—

Source: FIBA
Rules for classification: 1) Points; 2) Head-to-head record; 3) Head-to-head point differential; 4) General point differential; 5) Points scored.

==== Group D ====
Pos	Team	Pld	W	L	PF	PA	PD	Pts	Qualification	HAT	ENI	TSM	RUZ
1	(Turkey) Hatay BB	6	5	1	468	437	+31	11	Round of 16	—	92–86	79–71	80–79
2	(Russia) Enisey Krasnoyarsk	6	4	2	449	413	+36	10	Play-off Round 1	70–65	—	68–70	82–59
3	(Belarus) Tsmoki-Minsk	6	3	3	401	393	+8	9	Play-off Round 1	66–67	68–70	—	64–53
4	(Slovakia) MBK Ružomberok	6	0	6	371	446	−75	6		65–85	59–73	56–62	—

Source: FIBA
Rules for classification: 1) Points; 2) Head-to-head record; 3) Head-to-head point differential; 4) General point differential; 5) Points scored.

==== Group E ====
Pos	Team	Pld	W	L	PF	PA	PD	Pts	Qualification	ART	SEP	GAL	LUL
1	(Poland) Artego Bydgoszcz	6	4	2	453	421	+32	10	Play-off Round 1	—	72–67	79–75	78–82
2	(Romania) ACS Sepsi SIC	6	4	2	418	402	+16	10	Play-off Round 1	50–76	—	78–62	64–48
3	(Turkey) Galatasaray	6	3	3	438	433	+5	9		85–76	70–78	—	74–55
4	(Sweden) Luleå BBK	6	1	5	388	441	−53	7		62–72	74–81	67–72	—

Source: FIBA
Rules for classification: 1) Points; 2) Head-to-head record; 3) Head-to-head point differential; 4) General point differential; 5) Points scored.

=== Conference 2 ===
==== Group F ====
Pos	Team	Pld	W	L	PF	PA	PD	Pts	Qualification	AVE	GER	GYO	OLI
1	(Spain) Perfumerías Avenida	6	6	0	479	287	+192	12	Round of 16	—	62–59	83–43	92–49
2	(Spain) Lointek Gernika Bizkaia	6	4	2	432	312	+120	10	Play-off Round 1	56–69	—	77–41	96–34
3	(Hungary) UNI Győr Mély-Út	6	2	4	319	410	−91	8		35–67	60–74	—	76–62
4	(Portugal) Olivais F.C.	6	0	6	283	504	−221	6		45–106	46–70	47–64	—

Source: FIBA
Rules for classification: 1) Points; 2) Head-to-head record; 3) Head-to-head point differential; 4) General point differential; 5) Points scored.

==== Group G ====
Pos	Team	Pld	W	L	PF	PA	PD	Pts	Qualification	VAL	OLY	CEG	NAM
1	(Spain) Valencia Basket Club SAD	6	6	0	450	330	+120	12	Round of 16	—	77–66	93–49	75–44
2	(Greece) Olympiacos	6	4	2	465	358	+107	10	Play-off Round 1	75–78	—	93–53	70–41
3	(Hungary) VBW CEKK Cegléd	6	2	4	344	466	−122	8		51–77	54–78	—	69–64
4	(Belgium) Namur	6	0	6	310	415	−105	6		45–50	55–83	61–68	—

Source: FIBA
Rules for classification: 1) Points; 2) Head-to-head record; 3) Head-to-head point differential; 4) General point differential; 5) Points scored.

==== Group H ====
Pos	Team	Pld	W	L	PF	PA	PD	Pts	Qualification	BLA	SEU	DVT	PEA
1	(France) Basket Landes	6	6	0	446	364	+82	12	Round of 16	—	65–60	81–66	83–48
2	(Spain) Cadí La Seu	6	3	3	440	392	+48	9	Play-off Round 1	57–70	—	94–72	89–57
3	(Hungary) Aluinvent DVTK Miskolc	6	3	3	434	423	+11	9	Play-off Round 1	71–72	73–69	—	75–47
4	(Hungary) PEAC-Pécs	6	0	6	329	470	−141	6		62–75	55–71	60–77	—

Source: FIBA
Rules for classification: 1) Points; 2) Head-to-head record; 3) Head-to-head point differential; 4) General point differential; 5) Points scored.

==== Group I ====
Pos	Team	Pld	W	L	PF	PA	PD	Pts	Qualification	SZE	SKW	KEL	HER
1	(Hungary) KSC Szekszárd	6	5	1	435	353	+82	11	Round of 16	—	59–55	83–48	85–61
2	(Belgium) Basket Hema SKW	6	4	2	380	343	+37	10	Play-off Round 1	67–48	—	63–53	73–64
3	(Germany) Rutronik Stars Keltern	6	2	4	375	437	−62	8		63–90	74–68	—	65–79
4	(Germany) Herner TC	6	1	5	362	419	−57	7		59–70	45–54	54–72	—

Source: FIBA
Rules for classification: 1) Points; 2) Head-to-head record; 3) Head-to-head point differential; 4) General point differential; 5) Points scored.

==== Group J ====
Pos	Team	Pld	W	L	PF	PA	PD	Pts	Qualification	CAR	RVB	FRI	LIE
1	(France) Flammes Carolo Basket	6	5	1	503	361	+142	11	Round of 16	—	81–84	96–64	81–48
2	(France) Roche Vendée Basket Club	6	4	2	437	394	+43	10	Play-off Round 1	58–80	—	71–51	90–51
3	(Switzerland) BCF Elfic Fribourg Basket	6	3	3	380	453	−73	9	Play-off Round 1	59–98	73–60	—	74–73
4	(Belgium) VOO Liège Panthers	6	0	6	333	445	−112	6		48–67	58–74	55–59	—

Source: FIBA
Rules for classification: 1) Points; 2) Head-to-head record; 3) Head-to-head point differential; 4) General point differential; 5) Points scored.

=== Ranking of third-placed teams ===
==== Conference 1 ====
Pos	Grp	Team	Pld	W	L	PF	PA	PD	Pts	Qualification
1	B	(Turkey) Beşiktaş TRC İnşaat	6	3	3	523	478	+45	9	Play-off Round 1
2	D	(Belarus) Tsmoki-Minsk	6	3	3	401	393	+8	9	Play-off Round 1
3	E	(Turkey) Galatasaray	6	3	3	438	433	+5	9	
4	A	(Israel) Ramla	6	3	3	449	462	−13	9	
5	C	(Turkey) Bellona Kayseri Basketbol	6	3	3	394	429	−35	9	

Source: FIBA.com
Rules for classification: 1) Points; 2) Points difference; 3) Points scored.

==== Conference 2 ====
Pos	Grp	Team	Pld	W	L	PF	PA	PD	Pts	Qualification
1	H	(Hungary) Aluinvent DVTK Miskolc	6	3	3	434	423	+11	9	Play-off Round 1
2	J	(Switzerland) BCF Elfic Fribourg Basket	6	3	3	380	453	−73	9	Play-off Round 1
3	I	(Germany) Rutronik Stars Keltern	6	2	4	375	437	−62	8	
4	F	(Hungary) UNI Győr Mély-Út	6	2	4	319	410	−91	8	
5	G	(Hungary) VBW CEKK Cegléd	6	2	4	344	466	−122	8	

Source: FIBA.com
Rules for classification: 1) Points; 2) Points difference; 3) Points scored.

=== Seeding ===
Seed	Grp	Team	Pld	W	L	PF	PA	PD	Pts	Qualification
1	F	(Spain) Perfumerías Avenida	6	6	0	479	287	+192	12	Round of 16
2	G	(Spain) Valencia Basket Club SAD	6	6	0	450	330	+120	12	Round of 16
3	H	(France) Basket Landes	6	6	0	446	364	+82	12	Round of 16
4	J	(France) Flammes Carolo Basket	6	5	1	503	361	+142	11	Round of 16
5	B	(Russia) MBA Moscow	6	5	1	506	397	+109	11	Round of 16
6	C	(Turkey) Orman Gençlik	6	5	1	508	409	+99	11	Round of 16
7	I	(Hungary) KSC Szekszárd	6	5	1	435	353	+82	11	Round of 16
8	D	(Turkey) Hatay BB	6	5	1	468	437	+31	11	Round of 16
9	B	(Russia) Sparta & K	6	4	2	556	400	+156	10	Play-off Round 1
10	F	(Spain) Lointek Gernika Bizkaia	6	4	2	432	312	+120	10	Play-off Round 1
11	G	(Greece) Olympiacos	6	4	2	465	358	+107	10	Play-off Round 1
12	C	(Poland) CCC Polkowice	6	4	2	462	398	+64	10	Play-off Round 1
13	J	(France) Roche Vendée Basket Club	6	4	2	437	394	+43	10	Play-off Round 1
14	I	(Belgium) Basket Hema SKW	6	4	2	380	343	+37	10	Play-off Round 1
15	D	(Russia) Enisey Krasnoyarsk	6	4	2	449	413	+36	10	Play-off Round 1
16	E	(Poland) Artego Bydgoszcz	6	4	2	453	421	+32	10	Play-off Round 1
17	E	(Romania) ACS Sepsi SIC	6	4	2	418	402	+16	10	Play-off Round 1
18	A	(Poland) InvestInTheWest ENEA Gorzów	6	3	3	473	410	+63	9	Play-off Round 1
19	H	(Spain) Cadí La Seu	6	3	3	440	392	+48	9	Play-off Round 1
20	B	(Turkey) Beşiktaş TRC İnşaat	6	3	3	523	478	+45	9	Play-off Round 1
21	A	(Turkey) Botaş SK	6	3	3	448	432	+16	9	Play-off Round 1
22	H	(Hungary) Aluinvent DVTK Miskolc	6	3	3	434	423	+11	9	Play-off Round 1
23	D	(Belarus) Tsmoki-Minsk	6	3	3	401	393	+8	9	Play-off Round 1
24	J	(Switzerland) BCF Elfic Fribourg Basket	6	3	3	380	453	−73	9	Play-off Round 1

Source: FIBA.com
Rules for classification: 1) Points; 2) Points difference; 3) Points scored.

== Play-offs ==
=== Bracket ===
Play-off Round 1
24 (Switzerland) BCF Elfic Fribourg Basket	72	63	135
9 (Russia) Sparta & K	89	79	168
17 (Romania) ACS Sepsi SIC	61	79	140
16 (Poland) Artego Bydgoszcz	70	71	141

Round of 16
9 (Russia) Sparta & K	90	70	160
8 (Turkey) Hatay BB	71	77	148
16 (Poland) Artego Bydgoszcz	64	67	131
1 (Spain) Perfumerías Avenida	78	80	158

Round of 8
9 (Russia) Sparta & K	65	61	126
1 (Spain) Perfumerías Avenida	77	92	169

Play-off Round 1
23 (Belarus) Tsmoki-Minsk	52	56	108
10 (Spain) Lointek Gernika Bizkaia	57	83	140
18 (Poland) InvestInTheWest Gorzów	67	77	144
15 (Russia) Enisey Krasnoyarsk	66	93	159

Round of 16
10 (Spain) Lointek Gernika Bizkaia	91	75	166
7 (Hungary) KSC Szekszárd	73	79	152
15 (Russia) Enisey Krasnoyarsk	60	49	109
2 (Spain) Valencia Basket Club SAD	55	64	119

Round of 8
10 (Spain) Lointek Gernika Bizkaia	61	50	111
2 (Spain) Valencia Basket Club SAD	71	72	143

Play-off Round 1
22 (Hungary) Aluinvent DVTK Miskolc	59	73	132
11 (Greece) Olympiacos	54	84	138
19 (Spain) Cadí La Seu	59	72	131
14 (Belgium) Basket Hema SKW	46	63	109

Round of 16
11 (Greece) Olympiacos	72	59	131
6 (Turkey) Orman Gençlik	64	83	147
19 (Spain) Cadí La Seu	64	50	114
3 (France) Basket Landes	50	81	131

Round of 8
6 (Turkey) Orman Gençlik	79	64	143
3 (France) Basket Landes	82	102	184

Play-off Round 1
21 (Turkey) Botaş SK	56	35	91
12 (Poland) CCC Polkowice	75	84	159
20 (Turkey) Beşiktaş TRC İnşaat	79	82	161
13 (France) Roche Vendée Basket	83	73	156

Round of 16
12 (Poland) CCC Polkowice	83	82	165
5 (Russia) MBA Moscow	60	82	142
20 (Turkey) Beşiktaş TRC İnşaat	76	72	148
4 (France) Flammes Carolo Basket	92	86	178

Round of 8
12 (Poland) CCC Polkowice	82	73	155
4 (France) Flammes Carolo Basket	84	83	167

Quarterfinals
(Belgium) Castors Braine
(Spain) Valencia Basket Club SAD
(France) Flammes Carolo Basket	74	74
(France) Basket Landes	74	74
(Russia) Dynamo Kursk
(Spain) Perfumerías Avenida
(Italy) Reyer Venezia
(Spain) Spar Citylift Girona

Semifinals

Final

== See also ==
- 2019–20 EuroLeague Women
