= 2018–19 Nemzeti Bajnokság I/A (women's basketball) =

Nemzeti Bajnokság I/A
- Season: 2018–19
- Dates: 28 September 2018 - 2019
- Games played: 182 (regular season)
- Teams: 14
- TV partner: M4 Sport

Finals
- Champions: Sopron Basket (13th title)
- Runners-up: Aluinvent DVTK
- Semifinalists: ZTE NKK; UNI Győr

The 2018–19 Nemzeti Bajnokság I/A (transl. National Championship I/A) is the 82nd season of the Nemzeti Bajnokság I/A, the highest professional basketball league in Hungary. Sopron Basket is the defending champion.

== Teams ==
Location of teams in 2018–19 Nemzeti Bajnokság I/A

The following 12 clubs compete in the NB I/A during the 2018–19 season. NKE-Csata was promoted to this season as champions from the Hungarian 2018–19 NB I/B.

=== Arenas and locations ===
Team	City	Hall	Capacity
BEAC	Budapest	Gabányi László Sportcsarnok	1,000
Ceglédi EKK	Cegléd	Gál József Sportcsarnok	1,100
NKE-Csata	Budapest	Ludovika Aréna	1,500
Diósgyőri VTK	Miskolc	Városi Sportcsarnok	1,900
UNI Győr	Győr	Egyetemi Csarnok	3,036
MTK-Budapest	Budapest	MTK Kosárlabda Csarnok	299
PEAC-Pécs	Pécs	Lauber Dezső Sportcsarnok	2,191
PINKK-Pécsi 424	Pécs	Kozármisleny Sportcsarnok	1,500
Sopron Basket	Sopron	Novomatic Aréna	2,200
KSC Szekszárd	Szekszárd	Városi Sportcsarnok	1,270
Vasas Akadémia	Budapest	Vasas Pasaréti Sportcentrum	299
Zalaegerszegi TE	Zalaegerszeg	Városi Sportcsarnok	2,800

=== Personnel and kits ===
Team	Head coach	Team captain	Kit manufacturer	Shirt sponsor
BEAC	(Hungary) Judit Balogh		Toti Sport	tippmix^{1}
Ceglédi EKK	(Serbia) Petar Janković		Toti Sport	VBW, tippmix^{1}
NKE-Csata	(Hungary) Krisztián Tursics		Spalding	tippmix^{1}
Diósgyőri VTK	(Hungary) László Cziczás		2Rule	Aluinvent, Borsodi, Apollo Tyres, tippmix^{1}
UNI Győr	(Italy) Sandro Orlando		Spalding	CBM Cargo, tippmix^{1}
MTK-Budapest	(Hungary) Dorottya Nagy		Spalding	tippmix^{1}
PEAC-Pécs	(Hungary) Róbert Meszlényi		Peak	tippmix^{1}, Pannonpower
PINKK-Pécsi 424	(Hungary) Miklós Laczka		Toti Sport	tippmix^{1}
Sopron Basket	(Spain) Roberto Íñiguez		Toti Sport	tippmix^{1}
KSC Szekszárd	(Serbia) Željko Đokić		Toti Sport	Tarr TV, tippmix^{1}
Vasas Akadémia	(Hungary) Attila Földi		Toti Sport	Car-Net, tippmix^{1}
Zalaegerszegi TE	(Hungary) Dávid Gáspár		Spalding	tippmix^{1}

==== Managerial changes ====
Team	Outgoing manager	Manner of departure	Date of vacancy	Position in table	Replaced by	Date of appointment
Ceglédi EKK	(Hungary) László Cziczás	Signed by Diósgyőri VTK	End of 2017–18 season	Pre-season	(Serbia) Petar Janković	2 May 2018
Diósgyőri VTK	(Hungary) Erzsébet Ambrus	End of caretaker spell	End of 2017–18 season	Pre-season	(Hungary) László Cziczás	19 June 2016

== Regular season ==
=== League table ===
Pos	Team	Pld	W	L	PF	PA	PD	Pts	Qualification
1	Sopron Basket	22	22	0	1869	1213	+656	44	Qualification for Playoffs
2	Aluinvent DVTK	22	18	4	1820	1516	+304	40	Qualification for Playoffs
3	Atomerőmű KSC Szekszárd	22	17	5	1638	1390	+248	39	Qualification for Playoffs
4	PEAC-Pécs	22	14	8	1642	1517	+125	36	Qualification for Playoffs
5	ZTE Női Kosárlabda Klub	22	14	8	1616	1479	+137	36	Qualification for Playoffs
6	CMB CARGO UNI GYÔR	22	12	10	1686	1530	+156	34	Qualification for Playoffs
7	NKE-FCSM Csata	22	11	11	1557	1544	+13	33	Qualification for Playoffs
8	VBW CEKK Cegléd	22	7	15	1527	1656	−129	29	Qualification for Playoffs
9	Vasas Akadémia	22	6	16	1451	1670	−219	28	Qualification for Playout
10	ELTE BEAC Újbuda	22	5	17	1423	1812	−389	27	Qualification for Playout
11	PINKK-Pécsi 424	22	4	18	1348	1700	−352	26	Qualification for Playout
12	MTK-Budapest	22	2	20	1221	1771	−550	24	Qualification for Playout

Updated to match(es) played on 6 May 2019. Source: Kosarsport.hu
Rules for classification: 1) Games played; 2) Points; 3) Wins; 4) Defeats; 5) Points for; 6) Points against; 7) Victories/Defeats series; 8) in Home games; 9) as a Guest; 10) Last 5 matches.

=== Results ===
Home \ Away	BEA	CEK	CSA	DIÓ	GYŐ	MTK	PEA	PIN	SOP	SZE	VAS	ZTE
BEAC Újbuda	—	62–68	51–67	81–121	60–101	65–60	56–83	55–56	54–84	54–73	84–80	58–81
Cegléd	76–79	—	72–66	71–79	65–63	78–68	70–71	84–70	65–90	57–69	71–89	84–78
NKE-Csata	108–81	72–50	—	64–76	84–62	74–47	75–81	71–58	58–104	54–61	73–78	80–63
Diósgyőri VTK	95–67	79–61	64–67	—	87–78	94–57	86–75	101–60	58–72	83–73	80–71	67–50
UNI Győr	100–76	91–86	92–60	74–79	—	85–71	74–61	77–63	53–82	68–78	90–75	63–65
MTK-Budapest	49–80	48–77	45–70	61–96	48–84	—	75–86	68–65	64–83	60–74	61–83	44–83
PEAC-Pécs	101–46	73–68	88–72	77–82	64–71	76–47	—	78–52	55–75	58–88	87–67	81–68
PINKK-Pécsi 424	73–66	77–70	56–87	77–104	53–79	56–63	56–80	—	54–82	71–92	72–70	38–62
Sopron	96–45	96–53	93–55	82–65	71–52	100–45	92–43	75–51	—	82–48	88–40	81–54
KSC Szekszárd	86–55	87–77	79–74	67–72	68–64	102–51	55–50	82–55	56–67	—	81–54	64–58
Vasas Akadémia	60–72	64–63	64–68	51–81	59–96	80–45	62–83	70–59	73–79	51–88	—	57–60
Zalaegerszegi TE	94–76	85–61	79–58	80–71	75–69	80–45	81–91	84–76	72–95	75–67	89–53	—

Updated to match(es) played on 6 May 2019. Source: Kosarsport.hu
Legend: Blue = home team win; Red = away team win.

== Playoffs ==
Teams in bold won the playoff series. Numbers to the left of each team indicate the team's original playoff seeding. Numbers to the right indicate the score of each playoff game.

Quarter-finals
1	**Sopron Basket**	**2**
8	VBW CEKK Cegléd	0
4	PEAC-Pécs	0
5	**ZTE NKK**	**2**
2	**Aluinvent DVTK**	**2**
7	NKE-Csata	0
3	KSC Szekszárd	1
6	**UNI Győr**	**2**

Semi-finals
1	**Sopron Basket**	**2**
5	ZTE NKK	0
2	**Aluinvent DVTK**	**2**
6	UNI Győr	1

Finals
1	**Sopron Basket**	**3**
2	Aluinvent DVTK	0
Third place
5	**ZTE NKK**	**2**
6	UNI Győr	1

=== Quarter-finals ===
In the quarterfinals, teams playing against each other had to win two games to win the series. Thus, if one team wins three games before all five games have been played, the games that remain are omitted. The team that finished in the higher regular season place, played the first, third (if it was necessary) games of the series at home.

Team 1	Series	Team 2	Game 1	Game 2	Game 3
**Sopron Basket**	3–0	VBW CEKK Cegléd	90–34	75–31	–
PEAC-Pécs	0–2	**ZTE Női Kosárlabda Klub**	72–77	75–58	–
**Aluinvent DVTK**	2–0	NKE-FCSM Csata	81–70	69–49	–
Atomerőmű KSC Szekszárd	1–2	**CMB CARGO UNI GYÔR**	70–48	60–57	60–65

=== Semi-finals ===
In the semifinals, teams playing against each other had to win three games to win the series. Thus, if one team wins three games before all five games have been played, the games that remain are omitted. The team that finished in the higher regular season place, played the first, third (if it was necessary) games of the series at home.

Team 1	Series	Team 2	Game 1	Game 2	Game 3
**Sopron Basket**	2–0	ZTE Női Kosárlabda Klub	72–37	90–62	–
**Aluinvent DVTK**	2–1	CMB CARGO UNI GYÔR	64–52	82–87	75–61

=== Finals ===
In the finals, teams playing against each other had to win three games to win the title. Thus, if one team won three games before all five games were played, the remaining games were omitted. The team that finished in the higher regular season place, played the first, the third, and the fifth (if it was necessary) games of the series at home.

Team 1	Series	Team 2	Game 1	Game 2	Game 3	Game 4	Game 5
**Sopron Basket**	3–0	Aluinvent DVTK	74–60	62–45	67–53	–	–

=== Third place ===
In the series for the third place, teams playing against each other had to win two games to win the 3rd place in the final rankings of the season. Thus, if one team won two games before all three games had been played, the remaining games were omitted. The team that finished in the higher regular season place, played the first and the third (if it was necessary) games of the series at home.

Team 1	Series	Team 2	Game 1	Game 2	Game 3
**ZTE Női Kosárlabda Klub**	2–1	CMB CARGO UNI GYÔR	68–74	69–49	80–60

== Hungarian clubs in European competitions ==
Club	Competition	Progress
Sopron Basket	EuroLeague	Fourth place
KSC Szekszárd	EuroLeague	Qualifying round
KSC Szekszárd	EuroCup	Round of 8
UNI Győr	EuroCup	Regular season
Ceglédi EKK	EuroCup	Regular season
Diósgyőri VTK	EuroCup	Round of 16

== See also ==
- 2019 Magyar Kupa
