= 2019–20 EuroLeague Women =

Basketball competition

EuroLeague Women
- Season: 2019–20
- Dates: 25 September – 2 October 2019 (qualifying); 16 October 2019 – 11 March 2020 (competition proper)
- Teams: 16 (competition proper); 19 (total)

Regular season
- Season MVP: (Ukraine) Alina Iagupova (Fenerbahçe Öznur Kablo)

Finals
- Champions: Null and void

The 2019–20 EuroLeague Women was the 62nd edition of the European women's club basketball championship organized by FIBA, and the 24th edition since being rebranded as the EuroLeague Women. The season was ended prematurely due to the COVID-19 pandemic.

On 16 June 2020, FIBA Europe announced the season was declared void and would not be finished due to the COVID-19 pandemic.

== Team allocation ==
A total of 19 teams from 11 countries will participate in the 2019–20 EuroLeague Women.

=== Teams ===
League positions of the previous season shown in parentheses (TH: EuroLeague Women title holders):

Regular season
(Belgium) Castors Braine (1st)	(Italy) Famila Schio (1st)	(Spain) Spar Citylift Girona (1st)
(Czech Republic) USK Praha (1st)	(Latvia) TTT Riga (1st)	(Turkey) Fenerbahçe (1st)
(France) LDLC ASVEL Féminin (1st)	(Russia) UMMC Ekaterinburg^{TH} (1st)	(Turkey) Çukurova Basketbol (2nd)
(France) Tango Bourges Basket (3rd)	(Russia) Dynamo Kursk (2nd)	
(Hungary) Sopron Basket (1st)	(Russia) Nadezhda Orenburg (3rd)	
Qualifying round
(France) BLMA (2nd)	(Hungary) Aluinvent DVTK Miskolc (2nd)	(Poland) Arka Gdynia (3rd)
(Greece) Olympiacos (1st)	(Italy) Reyer Venezia (3rd)	(Turkey) Botaş SK (3rd)

== Round and draw dates ==
=== Schedule ===
Phase	Round	Draw date	Round date
Qualifying round	First leg	23 July 2019	25 September 2019
Qualifying round	Second leg	23 July 2019	2 October 2019
Regular season	Matchday 1	23 July 2019	16–17 October 2019
Regular season	Matchday 2	23 July 2019	23–24 October 2019
Regular season	Matchday 3	23 July 2019	30–31 October 2019
Regular season	Matchday 4	23 July 2019	6–7 November 2019
Regular season	Matchday 5	23 July 2019	27–28 November 2019
Regular season	Matchday 6	23 July 2019	4–5 December 2019
Regular season	Matchday 7	23 July 2019	11–12 December 2019
Regular season	Matchday 8	23 July 2019	18–19 December 2019
Regular season	Matchday 9	23 July 2019	8–9 January 2020
Regular season	Matchday 10	23 July 2019	15–16 January 2020
Regular season	Matchday 11	23 July 2019	22–23 January 2020
Regular season	Matchday 12	23 July 2019	28 January 2020
Regular season	Matchday 13	23 July 2019	19–20 February 2020
Regular season	Matchday 14	23 July 2019	26 February 2020
Quarterfinals	First leg	23 July 2019	11 March 2020
Quarterfinals	Second leg	23 July 2019	18 March 2020
Quarterfinals	Third leg	23 July 2019	25 March 2020
Final Four	Semifinals	23 July 2019	17 April 2020
Final Four	Final	23 July 2019	19 April 2020

=== Draw ===
The draw was held on 23 July 2019 in Munich, Germany. The 16 teams were drawn into two groups of eight. For the draw, the teams were seeded into eight seeds.

Seed 1	Seed 2	Seed 3	Seed 4
(Russia) UMMC Ekaterinburg (Russia) Dynamo Kursk	(Czech Republic) ZVVZ USK Praha (Turkey) Fenerbahçe	(Hungary) Sopron Basket (France) Tango Bourges Basket	(Italy) Famila Schio (Russia) Nadezhda Orenburg

Seed 5	Seed 6	Seed 7	Seed 8
(Latvia) TTT Riga (Spain) Spar Citylift Girona	(Belgium) Castors Braine (France) Lyon ASVEL Féminin	(Turkey) Çukurova Basketbol; Qualifier 1	Qualifier 2 Qualifier 3

== Qualifying round ==
Team 1	Agg.	Team 2	1st leg	2nd leg
Botaş SK (Turkey)	147–172	(Poland) Arka Gdynia	72–88	75–84
Olympiacos (Greece)	130–152	(France) BLMA	63–66	67–86
Aluinvent DVTK Miskolc (Hungary)	153–156	(Italy) Reyer Venezia	85–75	68–81

== Regular season ==
Location of teams of the 2019–20 Euroleague Women regular season.
Red: Group A; Green: Group B.

The four top teams of each group will qualify to the quarterfinals.

If teams are level on record at the end of the Regular Season, tiebreakers are applied in the following order:

1. Head-to-head record
2. Head-to-head point differential
3. Head-to-head points scored
4. Point differential for the entire regular season
5. Points scored for the entire regular season

=== Group A ===
Pos	Team	Pld	W	L	PF	PA	PD	Pts	Qualification	EKA	USK	NAD	BOU	VEN	CAS	CUK	TTT
1	(Russia) UMMC Ekaterinburg	14	13	1	1258	853	+405	27	Advance to quarterfinals		88–65	89–67	86–47	97–44	101–73	112–37	87–67
2	(Czech Republic) ZVVZ USK Praha	14	12	2	1199	846	+353	26	Advance to quarterfinals	67–74		87–63	82–64	89–57	102–62	82–28	98–48
3	(Russia) Nadezhda Orenburg	14	9	5	938	911	+27	23	Advance to quarterfinals	50–71	67–86		74–65	78–51	62–55	74–64	69–61
4	(France) Tango Bourges Basket	14	8	6	969	961	+8	22	Advance to quarterfinals	51–87	64–93	66–57		68–45	80–59	92–62	79–75
5	(Italy) Reyer Venezia	14	5	9	800	961	−161	19	Transfer to EuroCup Women	61–86	50–77	61–63	73–63		58–75	70–61	20–0
6	(Belgium) Castors Braine	14	3	11	924	1073	−149	17	Transfer to EuroCup Women	79–87	65–89	47–80	63–72	58–61		90–59	76–71
7	(Turkey) Gelecek Koleji Çukurova	14	3	11	787	1177	−390	17		56–112	50–109	53–69	50–88	86–81	70–60		60–55
8	(Latvia) TTT Riga	14	3	11	866	959	−93	16 (Note: Due to cancelled match, TTT Riga lost by 20–0 and did not receive any points in the standings.)		89–81	66–73	55–65	55–70	60–68	81–62	83–51	

Source: FIBA

=== Group B ===
Pos	Team	Pld	W	L	PF	PA	PD	Pts	Qualification	FEN	ASV	FAM	BLM	KUR	GIR	SOP	GDY
1	(Turkey) Fenerbahçe Öznur Kablo	14	11	3	1003	838	+165	25	Advance to quarterfinals		82–67	58–43	74–58	76–55	86–82	70–52	68–48
2	(France) LDLC ASVEL Féminin	14	8	6	1020	984	+36	22	Advance to quarterfinals	78–65		85–48	78–77	84–59	89–67	62–59	71–87
3	(Italy) Famila Schio	14	8	6	794	793	+1	22	Advance to quarterfinals	54–75	69–59		65–60	70–53	58–55	20–0	51–47
4	(France) BLMA	14	7	7	969	980	−11	21	Advance to quarterfinals	76–74	80–73	60–73		76–64	45–57	53–66	85–79
5	(Russia) Dynamo Kursk	14	7	7	957	993	−36	21	Transfer to EuroCup Women	54–73	79–64	70–65	78–90		76–64	78–47	64–58
6	(Spain) Spar Citylift Girona	14	6	8	904	913	−9	20	Transfer to EuroCup Women	57–62	63–65	65–53	56–55	79–61		64–58	70–68
7	(Hungary) Sopron Basket	14	6	8	803	846	−43	19 (Note: Due to cancelled match, Sopron Basket lost by 20–0 and did not receive any points in the standings.)		62–60	67–53	59–51	70–77	61–74	66–56		59–61
8	(Poland) Arka Gdynia	14	3	11	926	1029	−103	17		52–80	82–92	47–74	73–77	86–92	71–69	67–77	

Source: FIBA

== Quarterfinals ==
Team 1	Series	Team 2	Game 1	Game 2	Game 3
UMMC Ekaterinburg (Russia)	Cancelled	(France) BLMA			
LDLC ASVEL (France)	Cancelled	(Russia) Nadezhda Orenburg	78–80		
ZVVZ USK Praha (Czech Republic)	Cancelled	(Italy) Famila Schio			
Fenerbahçe Öznur Kablo (Turkey)	Cancelled	(France) Tango Bourges Basket	84–75		

=== First leg ===
Cancelled	UMMC Ekaterinburg (Russia)	vs.	(France) BLMA	Verkhnyaya Pyshma
		Boxscore		Arena: UMMC Sports Palace

11 March 2020	Fenerbahçe Öznur Kablo (Turkey)	84–75 (Series: 1–0)	(France) Tango Bourges Basket	Istanbul
19:30 (UTC+3)	Scoring by quarter: 31–14, 17–15, 20–19, 16–22
	Pts: Williams 30; Rebs: Williams 14; Asts: Iagupova 8	Boxscore	Pts: Dabović 20; Rebs: Coleman 10; Asts: Eldebrink 5	Arena: Metro Energy Sports Hall; Referees: Aleksandar Milojević (MKD), Esperanza Mendoza (ESP), Nemanja Ninković (SRB)

Cancelled	ZVVZ USK Praha (Czech Republic)	vs.	(Italy) Famila Schio	Prague
		Boxscore		Arena: Královka Arena

11 March 2020	LDLC ASVEL Féminin (France)	78–80 (Series: 0–1)	(Russia) Nadezhda Orenburg	Lyon
20:00 (UTC+1)	Scoring by quarter: 13–15, 17–25, 16–15, 32–25
	Pts: Johannès 24; Rebs: Clark 8 Asts: Allemand 4	Boxscore	Pts: Raincock-Ekunwe, Shilova 19; Rebs: Raincock-Ekunwe 11; Asts: Verameyenka, Wheeler 7	Arena: Gymnase Mado Bonnet; Referees: Özlem Yalman (TUR), Nikolaos Somos (GRE), Alexandra Stan (ROU)

== Awards ==
=== EuroLeague MVP ===
- (Ukraine) Alina Iagupova ( (Turkey) Fenerbahçe Öznur Kablo)

=== All-EuroLeague Teams ===
First Team		Second Team	
(Ukraine) Alina Iagupova	(Turkey) Fenerbahçe Öznur Kablo	(Hungary) Courtney Vandersloot	(Russia) UMMC Ekaterinburg
(Italy) Cecilia Zandalasini	(Turkey) Fenerbahçe Öznur Kablo	(France) Marine Johannès	(France) LDLC ASVEL Féminin
(United States) Alyssa Thomas	(Czech Republic) ZVVZ USK Praha	(France) Gabby Williams	(France) BLMA
(Belgium) Emma Meesseman	(Russia) UMMC Ekaterinburg	(United States) Brionna Jones	(Czech Republic) ZVVZ USK Praha
(France) Sandrine Gruda	(Italy) Famila Schio	(United States) Brittney Griner	(Russia) UMMC Ekaterinburg

=== Coach of the Year ===
- (Spain) Víctor Lapeña ( (Turkey) Fenerbahçe Öznur Kablo)

=== Defensive Player of the Year ===
- (United States) Alyssa Thomas ( (Czech Republic) ZVVZ USK Praha)

=== Young Player of the Year ===
- (France) Iliana Rupert ( (France) Tango Bourges Basket)

=== MVP of the Week ===
Regular season

Week	Player	Team	EFF	Ref.
1	(Ukraine) Alina Iagupova	(Turkey) Fenerbahçe Öznur Kablo	29	
2	(Russia) Maria Vadeeva	(Russia) UMMC Ekaterinburg	39	
3	(United States) Stephanie Mavunga	(France) BLMA	40	
4	(Ukraine) Alina Iagupova (2)	(Turkey) Fenerbahçe Öznur Kablo	41	
5	(France) Romane Bernies	(France) BLMA	28	
5	(Spain) Cristina Ouviña	(Czech Republic) ZVVZ USK Praha	28	
6	(United States) Celeste Trahan-Davis	(Belgium) Castors Braine	36	
7	(United States) Alyssa Thomas	(Czech Republic) ZVVZ USK Praha	45	
8	(United States) Alyssa Thomas (2)	(Czech Republic) ZVVZ USK Praha	40	
9	(United States) Stephanie Mavunga (2)	(France) BLMA	30	
10	(United States) Marissa Coleman	(France) Tango Bourges Basket	32	
10	(France) Gabby Williams	(France) BLMA	32	
11	(France) Sandrine Gruda	(Italy) Famila Schio	32	
12	(Russia) Epiphanny Prince	(Russia) Dynamo Kursk	32	
13	(United States) Brionna Jones	(Czech Republic) ZVVZ USK Praha	33	
14	(United States) Brionna Jones (2)	(Czech Republic) ZVVZ USK Praha	27	
