= Beatrice Mompremier =

American basketball player (born 1996)

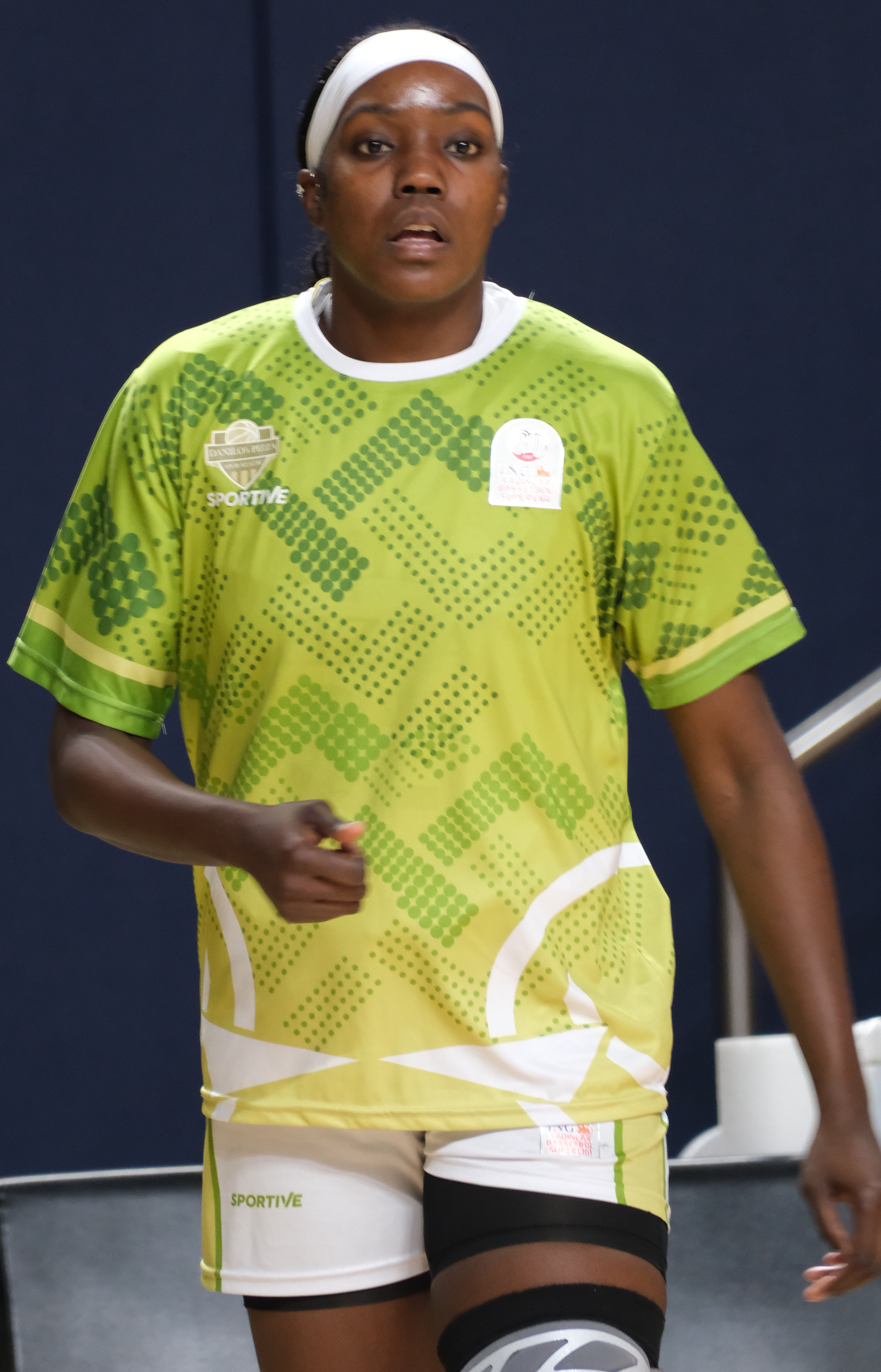

Danilo's Pizza SK
- Position: Forward / center
- League: WNBA

Personal information
- Born: August 8, 1996 (age 30) Miami, Florida, U.S.
- Listed height: 6 ft 4 in (1.93 m)
- Listed weight: 190 lb (86 kg)

Career information
- High school: Miami Senior (Miami, Florida)
- College: Baylor (2015–2017); Miami (Florida) (2018–2020)
- WNBA draft: 2020: 2nd round, 20th overall pick
- Drafted by: Los Angeles Sparks
- Playing career: 2020–present

Career history
- 2020–2021: Connecticut Sun
- 2022: Atlanta Dream
- 2024-present: Danilo's Pizza

Career highlights
- First-team All-ACC (2019); Big 12 All-Freshman Team (2016); McDonald's All-American (2015)
- Stats at WNBA.com
- Stats at Basketball Reference
Medals
Women's basketball
Representing the United States
Pan American Games
| Silver medal – second place | 2019 Lima | Team |
FIBA Under-18 Americas Championship
| Gold medal – first place | 2014 United States | Team |

Beatrice Mompremier (born August 8, 1996) is an American basketball player who last played for the Atlanta Dream in the Women's National Basketball Association (WNBA). She was drafted 20th overall in the 2020 WNBA draft by the Los Angeles Sparks after playing college basketball for the Miami Hurricanes.

== College career ==
Mompremier attended Baylor University after graduating from Miami Senior High School in 2015. After two seasons, she transferred to her hometown Miami Hurricanes.

During the 2018–19 season, Mompremier was a named an honorable mention All-American by the Associated Press as well as a first-team All-ACC selection. Despite being eligible for the 2019 WNBA draft, she opted to return to Miami for her senior season. Following the 2019–20 season, Mompremier was named an Honorable Mention All-American by the Associated Press.

== Professional career ==
=== Los Angeles Sparks ===
She was selected with the 20th overall pick in the 2020 WNBA draft by the Los Angeles Sparks. Following the draft, she signed a contract with the Sparks but was released on June 1 - ultimately not making the roster.

=== Connecticut Sun ===
On June 23, 2020, she signed with the Connecticut Sun as a replacement for all-star Jonquel Jones, who chose to sit-out the 2020 WNBA season. On May 4, 2022, Mompremier was waived from training camp.

=== Atlanta Dream ===
On May 6, 2022, the Dream claimed Mompremier off of the waiver wire.

== Career statistics ==
Legend
| GP | Games played | GS | Games started | MPG | Minutes per game | RPG | Rebounds per game |
| APG | Assists per game | SPG | Steals per game | BPG | Blocks per game | PPG | Points per game |
| TO | Turnovers per game | FG% | Field-goal percentage | 3P% | 3-point field-goal percentage | FT% | Free-throw percentage |
| **Bold** | Career best | ° | League leader |

=== College ===
| Year | Team | GP | GS | MPG | FG% | 3P% | FT% | RPG | APG | SPG | BPG | TO | PPG |
|---|---|---|---|---|---|---|---|---|---|---|---|---|---|
| 2015–16 | Baylor | **38** | 26 | 14.9 | .535 | .000 | .406 | 6.1 | 0.7 | 0.7 | **1.6** | 1.8 | 7.2 |
| 2016–17 | Baylor | 32 | 10 | 14.5 | **.550** | .000 | .578 | 6.5 | 0.5 | 0.1 | 1.5 | **1.7** | 8.3 |
| 2017–18 | Miami | Redshirt | | | | | | | | | | | |
| 2018–19 | Miami | 33 | **32** | **29.5** | .528 | **.333** | .579 | **12.2** | **0.9** | 0.9 | 1.0 | 2.8 | 16.7 |
| 2019–20 | Miami | 17 | 14 | 25.9 | .521 | .308 | **.705** | 9.8 | 0.6 | **1.1** | 1.4 | 3.4 | **16.8** |
| Career | 5 years, 2 team | 120 | 82 | 20.4 | .532 | .313 | .565 | 8.4 | 0.7 | 0.6 | 1.4 | 2.3 | 11.5 |

=== WNBA career statistics ===
==== Regular season ====
| Year | Team | GP | GS | MPG | FG% | 3P% | FT% | RPG | APG | SPG | BPG | TO | PPG |
|---|---|---|---|---|---|---|---|---|---|---|---|---|---|
| 2020 | Connecticut | 21 | 0 | **8.9** | .426 | .000 | **.444** | **3.3** | 0.1 | 0.2 | **0.6** | 0.7 | **2.3** |
| 2021 | Connecticut | **32** | 0 | 8.6 | **.491** | .000 | .417 | 2.4 | 0.2 | **0.4** | 0.3 | **0.6** | 1.8 |
| 2022 | Atlanta | 21 | 0 | 8.3 | .455 | .000 | .385 | 2.8 | **0.4** | 0.1 | **0.6** | 0.7 | 2.1 |
| Career | 3 years, 2 teams | 74 | 0 | 8.6 | .458 | .000 | .419 | 2.8 | 0.2 | 0.3 | 0.5 | 0.6 | 2.0 |

=== Postseason ===
| Year | Team | GP | GS | MPG | FG% | 3P% | FT% | RPG | APG | SPG | BPG | TO | PPG |
|---|---|---|---|---|---|---|---|---|---|---|---|---|---|
| 2020 | Connecticut | **7** | 0 | **12.3** | .333 | .000 | **.400** | **3.6** | **0.1** | **0.6** | **0.9** | **0.4** | **1.7** |
| 2021 | Connecticut | 2 | 0 | 3.5 | **.500** | .000 | .000 | 1.0 | 0.5 | 0.0 | 0.0 | 0.5 | 1.0 |
| Career | 2 years, 1 team | 53 | 0 | 8.7 | .460 | .000 | .433 | 2.8 | 0.2 | 0.3 | 0.4 | 0.6 | 2.0 |

=== Overseas ===
==== National competition ====
===== Regular season =====
| Season | Team | League | GP | GS | MPG | FG% | 3P% | FT% | RPG | APG | SPG | BPG | TO | PPG |
|---|---|---|---|---|---|---|---|---|---|---|---|---|---|---|
| 2020–21 | UNI Győr | (Hungary) NB I/A | **20** | **20** | 25.2 | .644 | .000 | **.592** | 11.0 | 1.0 | 0.4 | 1.5 | 2.8 | 16.2 |
| 2021–22 | UNI Győr | (Hungary) NB I/A | 17 | 16 | **28.6** | .591 | .000 | .553 | **11.9**° | 1.1 | **0.9** | 1.2 | 2.7 | **18.4**° |
| 2022–23 | UNI Győr | (Hungary) NB I/A | 17 | 17 | 27.0 | **.662** | .000 | .580 | 11.1° | **2.5** | 0.8 | **2.1**° | 2.8 | 13.5 |
| 2023–24 | Sopron Basket | (Hungary) NB I/A | 13 | 12 | 21.2 | .613 | .000 | .432 | 8.3 | 1.3 | 0.5 | 1.0 | **1.9** | 11.2 |
| 2024–25 | Bursa Uludağ Basketbol | (Turkey) KBSL | | | | | | | | | | | | |

===== Playoff =====
| Season | Team | League | GP | GS | MPG | FG% | 3P% | FT% | RPG | APG | SPG | BPG | TO | PPG |
|---|---|---|---|---|---|---|---|---|---|---|---|---|---|---|
| 2020–21 | UNI Győr | (Hungary) NB I/A | 6 | 6 | **29.7** | **.564** | .000 | **.742** | **13.5** | 1.2 | **1.7** | 0.8 | 3.0 | **18.5** |
| 2021–22 | UNI Győr | (Hungary) NB I/A | 6 | 6 | 26.8 | .542 | .000 | .556 | 13.3 | 1.0 | 0.7 | **1.5** | 3.8 | 17.5 |
| 2022–23 | UNI Győr | (Hungary) NB I/A | Suffered a season-ending injury in the regular season | | | | | | | | | | | |
| 2023–24 | Sopron Basket | (Hungary) NB I/A | 4 | 0 | 21.8 | .560 | .000 | .529 | 7.0 | **1.3** | 0.3 | 1.0 | **1.8** | 9.3 |

==== International competition ====
| Season | Team | League | GP | GS | MPG | FG% | 3P% | FT% | RPG | APG | SPG | BPG | TO | PPG |
|---|---|---|---|---|---|---|---|---|---|---|---|---|---|---|
| 2020–21 | UNI Győr | EuroCup | 3 | 3 | 26.8 | **.512** | .000 | .500 | 10.3 | 0.7 | 0.3 | 1.0 | 3.0 | **18.0** |
| 2021–22 | UNI Győr | EuroCup | 5 | 5 | **31.0** | .442 | .000 | .421 | **14.0** | **2.0** | 0.8 | 1.0 | 4.4 | 15.2 |
| 2022–23 | UNI Győr | EuroCup | **8** | **8** | 30.8 | .494 | .000 | **.696** | 10.6 | 1.3 | **1.0** | **2.9** | **2.6** | 12.8 |

== Personal ==
Mompremier is of Haitian descent and speaks Haitian Creole as well as English.
