= KSC Szekszárd =

Hungarian women's basketball team

Atomerőmű KSC Szekszárd
- Leagues: NB I/A
- Arena: City Sports Hall
- Location: Szekszárd
- Team colors: Blue and white
- Head coach: Magyar Bianka
- Website: http://kscszekszard.hu/

Atomerőmű KSC Szekszárd, is a Hungarian women's basketball team, that is based in Szekszárd (Hungary), and that competes in the top flight of the Hungarian women's basketball leagues.

== History ==
The club played first time at the Hungarian First class of women in 1975. The head coach of the self-educated team was Pál Buttás. The name of the team at that time was Szekszárd Vasas Sport Kör. The Basketball Sport Club Szekszárd was founded in February 1988, and since 1989 it has been playing its home games in the Szekszárd City Sports Hall. In 1991, the first foreign player to join the team, while in 2005 the first American basketball player. Until 2000, the difficult financial situation of the club also determined the team's performance, when the Paks Nuclear Power Plant became the name-giving sponsor of the team. In the 2016-2017 and subsequent seasons, the club played in the finals of the Hungarian championship, but beaten by Sopron Basket on both occasions. In the 2017-2018 season, they were able to celebrate the Hungarian Cup victory.

== Players ==
=== Current squad ===
Atomerőmű KSC Szekszárd roster
Players
Coaches

Pos.	No.	Nat.	Name	Ht.	Age
C	5	(United States)	Hebard, Ruthy	1.93 m (6 ft 4 in)	27 – 28 April 1998
G/F	7	(Hungary)	Miklós, Melinda	1.84 m (6 ft 0 in)	22 – 10 October 2003
G	9	(Hungary)	Studer, Ágnes	1.69 m (5 ft 7 in)	27 – 10 September 1998
SF	11	(Hungary)	Mányoky, Réka	1.86 m (6 ft 1 in)	24 – 11 August 2001
SF	13	(Hungary)	Bálint, Réka	1.85 m (6 ft 1 in)	34 – 6 March 1991
C	20	(Hungary)	Horváth, Dóra	1.92 m (6 ft 4 in)	22 – 22 April 2003
F	22	(United States) (Hungary)	Goree, Cyesha	1.90 m (6 ft 3 in)	32 – 4 August 1993
SG	23	(United States) (United Kingdom)	Wallace, Sydney	1.75 m (5 ft 9 in)	32 – 16 December 1993
SG	24	(Hungary)	Boros, Júlia	1.78 m (5 ft 10 in)	23 – 3 September 2002
F	35	(United States)	Vivians, Victoria	1.83 m (6 ft 0 in)	31 – 17 November 1994
G/F	66	(Hungary)	Holcz, Rebeka	1.78 m (5 ft 10 in)	21 – 3 June 2004
C	88	(Hungary)	Szűcs, Gréta	1.85 m (6 ft 1 in)	19 – 6 October 2006

Head coach

- (Serbia) Željko Djokić

Assistant coach(es)

- (Hungary) Zsófia Horváth

Athletic trainer(s)

- (Serbia) Alen Ninkov

Legend

- (C) Team captain
- Injured

- Roster
Updated: 2022-09-19

=== Depth chart ===
Pos.	Starting 5	Bench
C	Ruthy Hebard	Dóra Horváth
PF	Cyesha Goree	Gréta Szűcs
SF	Victoria Vivians	Réka Bálint
SG	Júlia Boros	Réka Mányoky
PG	Ágnes Studer	Melinda Miklós

== Honours ==
=== International competitions ===
- EuroCup

3rd Place (1): 2020–21

=== Domestic competitions ===
- Hungarian Women's National Championship

Runners-up (4): 2016–17, 2017–18, 2020–21, 2021–22

- Hungarian Cup

Winner (1): 2018
Runners-up (2): 2019, 2020

== Season by season ==
Season	Tier	League	Pos.	Magyar kupa	European competitions	
2008–09	1	NB I/A	9th			
2009–10	1	NB I/A	5th-8th	Quarterfinalist		
2010–11	1	NB I/A	9th	First round		
2011–12	1	NB I/A	7th	Quarterfinalist		
2012–13	1	NB I/A	7th	Quarterfinalist		
2013–14	1	NB I/A	5th	Quarterfinalist		
2014–15	1	NB I/A	8th	Quarterfinalist		
2015–16	1	NB I/A	7th	Quarterfinalist		
2016–17	1	NB I/A	2nd	Quarterfinalist		
2017–18	1	NB I/A	2nd	Champion	1 EuroLeague	QR
2017–18	1	NB I/A	2nd	Champion	2 EuroCup	L12
2018–19	1	NB I/A	5th	Runner-up	2 EuroCup	L12
2019–20	1	NB I/A	abandoned due to the COVID-19 pandemic	Runner-up	2 EuroCup	L20
2020–21	1	NB I/A	2nd	3rd	2 EuroCup	3RD
2021–22	1	NB I/A	2nd	3rd	1 EuroLeague	RS
2021–22	1	NB I/A	2nd	3rd	2 EuroCup	QF

=== In European competition ===
Source: basketball.eurobasket.com

- Participations in EuroLeague: 2x
- Participations in EuroCup: 5x

Season	Competition	Round	Club	Home	Away	Aggregate
2017–18	EuroLeague	Qual. Round	(France) Basket Lattes	80-79	71-86	151–165
2017–18	EuroCup					
2017–18	EuroCup	Regular season (Group H)	(Italy) Virtus Eirene Ragusa	56–74	59–72	2nd
2017–18	EuroCup	Regular season (Group H)	(Czech Republic) Basketball Nymburk	73–66	86–69	2nd
2017–18	EuroCup	Regular season (Group H)	(Portugal) G.D.E.S. Santo Andre	91–65	70–56	2nd
2017–18	EuroCup	Last 28	(Hungary) UNI Győr	76–62	80–67	156–134
2017–18	EuroCup	Last 20	(Poland) Ślęza Wrocław	72–77	84–74	156–151
2017–18	EuroCup	Last 12	(Turkey) Hatay	74–76	65–98	139–174
2018–19	EuroCup	Regular season (Group H)	(Slovakia) MBK Ružomberok	87–72	58–65	1st
2018–19	EuroCup	Regular season (Group H)	(Czech Republic) Basketball Nymburk	72–65	72–49	1st
2018–19	EuroCup	Regular season (Group H)	(Slovenia) ZKK Cinkarna Celje	90–56	75–68	1st
2018–19	EuroCup	Last 20	(Poland) Artego Bydgoszcz	60–77	86–60	146–137
2018–19	EuroCup	Last 12	(Spain) Spar CityLift Girona	79–73	73–80	152–153
2019–20	EuroCup	Regular season (Group I)	(Belgium) Basket Hema SKW	59–55	48–67	1st
2019–20	EuroCup	Regular season (Group I)	(Germany) Rutronik Stars Keltern	83–48	90–63	1st
2019–20	EuroCup	Regular season (Group I)	(Germany) Herner TC	85–61	70–59	1st
2019–20	EuroCup	Last 20	(Spain) Lointek Gernika Bizkaia	73–91	79–75	152–166
2020–21	EuroCup	Regular season (Group A)	(Turkey) Kayseri Basketbol	88–71	—	1st
2020–21	EuroCup	Regular season (Group A)	(Hungary) UNI Győr Mély-Út	75–67	—	1st
2020–21	EuroCup	Regular season (Group A)	(Ukraine) BC Prometey	106–80	—	1st
2020–21	EuroCup	Last 16	(France) Saint-Amand Hainaut Basket	66-53		
2020–21	EuroCup	Quarterfinal	(Turkey) Elazığ İl Özel İdarespor	77-67		
2020–21	EuroCup	Semifinal (F4)	(Italy) Reyer Venezia	58-63		
2020–21	EuroCup	Third place (F4)	(France) Flammes Carolo Basket	68-55		
2021–22	EuroLeague	Qual. Round	(Turkey) Kayseri Basketbol	80-70		1st
2021–22	EuroLeague	Qual. Round	(Romania) ACS Sepsi SIC	79-78		1st
2021–22	EuroLeague	Regular season (Group A)	(Italy) Umana Reyer Venezia	51–65	59–80	8th
2021–22	EuroLeague	Regular season (Group A)	(France) BLMA	65–72	57–82	8th
2021–22	EuroLeague	Regular season (Group A)	(Czech Republic) ZVVZ USK Praha	51–89	56–83	8th
2021–22	EuroLeague	Regular season (Group A)	(Russia) MBA Moscow	64–73	62–65	8th
2021–22	EuroLeague	Regular season (Group A)	(Russia) UMMC Ekaterinburg	67–82	52–89	8th
2021–22	EuroLeague	Regular season (Group A)	(Spain) Perfumerías Avenida	84–88	54–96	8th
2021–22	EuroLeague	Regular season (Group A)	(Latvia) TTT Riga	65–68	68–69	8th
2021–22	EuroCup	Quarterfinal	(Turkey) Galatasaray	60–88	69–76	129–164
2022–23	EuroLeague	Regular season (Group A)	(Czech Republic) ZVVZ USK Praha	56–95	71–82	7th
2022–23	EuroLeague	Regular season (Group A)	(Turkey) Fenerbahçe Alagöz Holding	103–101	71–91	7th
2022–23	EuroLeague	Regular season (Group A)	(Spain) Valencia BC	54–75	59–74	7th
2022–23	EuroLeague	Regular season (Group A)	(Greece) Olympiacos	78–69	68–87	7th
2022–23	EuroLeague	Regular season (Group A)	(France) Tango Bourges	61–77	62–83	7th
2022–23	EuroLeague	Regular season (Group A)	(Italy) Virtus Segafredo Bologna	73–64	59–89	7th
2022–23	EuroLeague	Regular season (Group A)	(Poland) BC Polkowice	76–94	56–89	7th
2023–24	EuroCup	Regular season (Group K)	(Czech Republic) Levhartice Chomutov	76–65	95–89	3rd
2023–24	EuroCup	Regular season (Group K)	(Spain) Movistar Estudiantes	54–56	69–83	3rd
2023–24	EuroCup	Regular season (Group K)	(Italy) BDS Dinamo Sassari	83–76	69–85	3rd
2023–24	EuroCup	Last 32	(Spain) Spar Girona	77–89	51–63	128–152
2024–25	EuroLeague	Qual. Round	(Czech Republic) Žabiny Brno			
