= Aleksandra Crvendakić =

Serbian basketball player (born 1996)

No. 11 – LDLC ASVEL Féminin
- Position: Power forward
- League: Ligue Féminine de Basketball; EuroLeague

Personal information
- Born: 17 March 1996 (age 30) Loznica, Serbia, FR Yugoslavia
- Listed height: 6 ft 2 in (1.88 m)

Career information
- Playing career: 2009–present

Career history
- 2009–2011: Loznica
- 2011–2014: Crvena zvezda
- 2014–2020: Sopron Basket
- 2020-2022: LDLC ASVEL Féminin
- 2022-2023: CB Avenida
- 2023: Çukurova Basketbol Mersin
- 2023-2024: Sopron Basket

Career highlights
- 2× Serbian Player of the Year (2018, 2023)
Medals
Women's basketball
Representing Serbia
Olympic Games
Bronze medal – third place	2016 Rio de Janeiro	Team
EuroBasket
Gold medal – first place	2021 France/Spain
Bronze medal – third place	2019 Latvia/Serbia
European U18 Championship
Bronze medal – third place	2012 Romania	Team
Bronze medal – third place	2013 Croatia	Team

Aleksandra Crvendakić (Serbian Cyrillic: Александра Црвендакић, born 17 March 1996) is a Serbian former professional women's basketball player. She was a member of the Serbian national basketball team. Her last club was Sopron Basket.

== International career ==
She was in the Serbian national basketball team at the 2016 Olympic Games.
