= Erica McCall =

American basketball player (born 1995)

Stanford Cardinal
- Title: Assistant coach
- Conference: Atlantic Coast Conference

Personal information
- Born: August 21, 1995 (age 31) Bakersfield, California, U.S.
- Listed height: 6 ft 2 in (1.88 m)
- Listed weight: 184 lb (83 kg)

Career information
- High school: Ridgeview (Bakersfield, California)
- College: Stanford (2013–2017)
- WNBA draft: 2017: 2nd round, 17th overall pick
- Drafted by: Indiana Fever
- Playing career: 2017–2021
- Position: Forward

Career history

Playing
- 2017–2020: Indiana Fever
- 2020: Atlanta Dream
- 2020: Minnesota Lynx
- 2021: Washington Mystics

Coaching
- 2023–present: Stanford (assistant)

Career highlights
- Pac-12 Tournament MOP (2017); 2× All-Pac-12 Team (2016, 2017); Pac-12 All-Defensive Team (2016); McDonald's All-American (2013)
- Stats at WNBA.com
- Stats at Basketball Reference
Medals
Women's basketball
Representing the United States
FIBA Under-17 World Cup
Gold medal – first place	2012 Netherlands	Team
2015 Summer Universiade
Gold medal – first place	2015 Gwangju	Team
FIBA Americas Under-16 Championship
Gold medal – first place	2011 Mexico	Team
Women's 3x3 basketball
Representing the United States
FIBA 3x3 U-18 World Championships
Gold medal – first place	2012 Spain	Team

Erica Angelyn McCall (born August 21, 1995) is an American professional basketball player. She played college basketball at Stanford University and completed her high school education at Ridgeview High School in Bakersfield, California.

== Early life ==
Erica was born on August 21, 1995, to Greg and Sonya McCall. She has two siblings, brother Justin McCall, and sister DeWanna Bonner, who plays basketball for the Atlanta Dream in the WNBA.

== USA Basketball ==
McCall was named to the USA Basketball U16 team, which competed in the Second FIBA Americas U16 Championship in 2011, held in Merida, Mexico. The team won all five contests, with an average margin of victory of 43 points per game. The win secured the gold medal for the competition, as well as an automatic bid to the Second FIBA U17 World Championship For Women - 2012 held in Amsterdam. McCall played in four of the five games, averaging three points per game.

McCall continued with the team as the U16 team became the U17 team and competed in the world championship event held in Amsterdam. The USA team won all eight contests to win the world championship and the gold-medal for the event. McCall played in all eight contests and averaged 3.8 points per game.

McCall was named to the 3x3 U18 team for the USA, along with teammates Kaela Davis, Diamond DeShields, and Brianna Turner. The event, formally known as the 3x3 Youth World Championship, was renamed to be the FIBA 3x3 U18 World Championship For Women. The 2012 championship was held in Alcobendas, Spain. The team started by winning their first four contest easily. In the fifth game they were matched against China. Both Davis and DeShields fouled out in regulation, leaving McCall and Turner to take on the three players for China. Despite the imbalance they took the game to overtime. In the overtime. The contest continued with two players against three, but McCall and Turner were unable to outscore their opponents in China won the game 13–12. The team went on to win the remaining games including the metal rounds to end up with a 7–1 record and the gold-medal representing the championship.

McCall was named to the USA team for the 2015 World University games held July 4–13 in Gwangju, South Korea. She played a key role in the success of the team, averaging 15 points per game and leading all players at the tournament and field-goal percentage, hitting 59.7% of her field-goal attempts. She had a double double in the opening game against Italy with 22 points and 18 rebounds. In the semifinal game against Japan she had a noble another double double with 19 points and 11 rebounds in a game that went to double overtime, with USA winning 102–98. In the gold-medal game against Canada the team had only a three-point lead starting the fourth quarter but score 34 points in the final quarter to win the gold-medal for the event.

== Stanford University Statistics ==
Legend
GP	Games played	GS	Games started	MPG	Minutes per game
FG%	Field goal percentage	3P%	3-point field goal percentage	FT%	Free throw percentage
RPG	Rebounds per game	APG	Assists per game	SPG	Steals per game
BPG	Blocks per game	PPG	Points per game	**Bold**	Career high

Year	Team	GP	Points	FG%	3P%	FT%	RPG	APG	SPG	BPG	PPG
2013-14	Stanford	36	118	43.9%	0.0%	54.5%	3.2	0.3	0.1	0.6	3.3
2014-15	Stanford	36	203	**51.7%**	0.0%	51.1%	5.4	0.2	0.2	1.4	5.6
2015-16	Stanford	34	508	50.9%	**39.3%**	68.6%	**9.4**	0.6	**0.9**	**1.9**	**14.9**
2016-17	Stanford	**38**	**547**	44.6%	26.4%	**68.8%**	9.0	**0.6**	0.6	1.7	14.4
Career		144	1376	47.9%	30.0%	64.8%	6.8	0.4	0.5	1.4	9.6

== WNBA ==
McCall was selected as the fifth pick of the second round (17th overall) of the 2017 WNBA draft by the Indiana Fever. On April 22, 2020, McCall was released by the Fever. On July 12, 2020, McCall signed with the Atlanta Dream. She was released from the Dream on July 29, 2020, to clear a roster spot for Glory Johnson, who was cleared to play after previously testing positive for the coronavirus One day later, McCall signed with the Minnesota Lynx to replace the injured Karima Christmas-Kelly. On February 5, 2021, McCall was traded to the Washington Mystics for a 2022 third-round draft pick.

== WNBA career statistics ==
Legend
GP	Games played	GS	Games started	MPG	Minutes per game	RPG	Rebounds per game
APG	Assists per game	SPG	Steals per game	BPG	Blocks per game	PPG	Points per game
TO	Turnovers per game	FG%	Field-goal percentage	3P%	3-point field-goal percentage	FT%	Free-throw percentage
**Bold**	Career best	°	League leader

=== Regular season ===
Year	Team	GP	GS	MPG	FG%	3P%	FT%	RPG	APG	SPG	BPG	TO	PPG
2017	Indiana	30	1	10.7	.406	**.333**	.682	2.3	0.2	0.1	0.3	0.7	3.3
2018	Indiana	**34**	2	12.3	.385	.125	.684	2.7	0.4	0.4	**0.5**	0.4	2.9
2019	Indiana	15	0	6.9	.136	.000	**1.000**	1.8	0.4	0.1	0.4	0.2	0.9
2020	Atlanta	1	0	0.0	.000	.000	.000	2.0	0.0	**1.0**	0.0	0.0	0.0
2020	Minnesota	19	0	9.4	.356	.250	.818	2.5	0.2	0.3	0.4	0.5	2.7
2021	Washington	23	**6**	**15.5**	**.500**	.000	.625	**4.3**	**0.6**	0.3	0.4	0.9	**4.1**
Career	5 years, 4 teams	122	9	11.3	.396	.188	.718	2.8	0.3	0.3	0.4	0.5	2.9

=== Playoffs ===
Year	Team	GP	GS	MPG	FG%	3P%	FT%	RPG	APG	SPG	BPG	TO	PPG
2020	Minnesota	3	0	5.3	.667	.000	1.000	2.0	0.0	0.0	0.3	0.0	2.3
Career	1 year, 1 team	3	0	5.3	.667	.000	1.000	2.0	0.0	0.0	0.3	0.0	2.3
