= Bernadett Határ =

Hungarian basketball player (born 1994)

Washington Mystics
- Position: Center
- League: WNBA

Personal information
- Born: August 24, 1994 (age 32) Pásztó, Hungary
- Listed height: 6 ft 10 in (2.08 m)
- Listed weight: 208 lb (94 kg)

Career information
- WNBA draft: 2021: undrafted
- Playing career: 2012–present

Career history
- 2012–2015: MBK Euroleasing Vasas
- 2015–2023: Sopron Basket
- 2021: Indiana Fever
- 2023: Connecticut Sun
- 2023–2024: Perfumerías Avenida
- 2024: Washington Mystics
- 2024: Valencia Basket
- 2024–2025: Elitzur Ramla
- 2025–: Reyer Venezia
- Stats at Basketball Reference

Bernadett Határ (born August 24, 1994) is a Hungarian basketball player for the Reyer Venezia of the EuroCup Women and the Hungarian national team. She participated at the EuroBasket Women 2015 and EuroBasket Women 2017.

Határ is the third-tallest Women's National Basketball Association (WNBA) player at 2.08 m (6 ft 10 in) tall, behind fellow centers, China's Han Xu, at 2.11 m (6 ft 11 in) and Poland's late Margo Dydek, who stood 2.18 m (7 ft 2 in).

== WNBA career ==
=== Indiana Fever ===
Határ signed with the Indiana Fever in February 2020 on a training camp deal. She became injured prior to the 2020 training camp and the Fever announced that she wouldn't play during the year and that her contract would be suspended. Határ signed again with the Fever in March 2021. During the 2021 season, Határ scored 12 points - her career and season-high - on May 21 against the Atlanta Dream. She earned her first start on July 3, but was injured and missed the rest of the season.

Prior to the 2022 season, Határ became injured again overseas while playing with Sopron Basket and would miss the entire WNBA season. Határ planned to return to Indiana for the 2023 season, signing another training camp contract with the Fever. She was suspended prior to the season due to her Hungarian National Team commitments with EuroBasket Women 2023. On June 8, 2023, the Fever announced that they would be waiving Határ.

=== Connecticut Sun ===
Határ signed with the Connecticut Sun on July 26, 2023, on a rest of season contract.

=== Washington Mystics ===
On May 7, 2024, Határ's rights were traded to the Washington Mystics, alongside a second-round pick in the 2025 WNBA draft, in exchange for Queen Egbo.

== WNBA career statistics ==
Legend
GP	Games played	GS	Games started	MPG	Minutes per game	RPG	Rebounds per game
APG	Assists per game	SPG	Steals per game	BPG	Blocks per game	PPG	Points per game
TO	Turnovers per game	FG%	Field-goal percentage	3P%	3-point field-goal percentage	FT%	Free-throw percentage
**Bold**	Career best	°	League leader

=== Regular season ===
Year	Team	GP	GS	MPG	FG%	3P%	FT%	RPG	APG	SPG	BPG	TO	PPG
2021	Indiana	**7**	**2**	**15.1**	**.483**	—	**.857**	**2.6**	**0.3**	0.4	**0.4**	1.6	**4.9**
2023	Connecticut	6	0	7.8	.375	—	—	1.5	0.2	**0.7**	0.3	**0.7**	2.0
Career	2 years, 2 teams	13	2	11.8	.444	—	.857	2.1	0.2	0.5	0.4	1.2	3.5
