= Jelena Brooks =

Serbian basketball player (born 1989)

No. 32 – Sopron Basket
- Position: Power forward
- League: EuroLeague

Personal information
- Born: 28 April 1989 (age 37) Kragujevac, SR Serbia, SFR Yugoslavia
- Listed height: 6 ft 3 in (1.91 m)
- Listed weight: 182 lb (83 kg)

Career information
- WNBA draft: 2009: 2nd round, 24th overall pick
- Drafted by: Washington Mystics
- Playing career: 2004–present

Career history
- 2001–2002: Šumadija Kragujevac
- 2002–2004: Dubočica Leskovac
- 2004–2007: Vojvodina
- 2007–2010: MKB Euroleasing Sopron
- 2010–2012: Spartak Moscow Region
- 2012–2013: UNIQA Euroleasing Sopron
- 2013–2015: Dynamo Kursk
- 2014: Washington Mystics
- 2015–2016: Orduspor
- 2016: Beşiktaş
- 2016–2017: Perfumerías Avenida
- 2017–present: Sopron Basket

Career highlights
- EuroLeague Women champion (2021–22); Serbian Player of the Year (2017)
- Stats at WNBA.com
- Stats at Basketball Reference
Medals
Women's basketball
Representing Serbia
Olympic Games
Bronze medal – third place	2016 Rio de Janeiro	Team
EuroBasket
Gold medal – first place	2015 Hungary/Romania
Gold medal – first place	2021 France/Spain
Bronze medal – third place	2019 Latvia/Serbia
European U20 Championship
Bronze medal – third place	2008 Italy	Team
World U19 Championship
Bronze medal – third place	2007 Slovakia	Team
European U18 Championship
Gold medal – first place	2007 Serbia	Team
Silver medal – second place	2006 Spain	Team
European U16 Championship
Silver medal – second place	2004 Italy	Team

Jelena Brooks (née Milovanović; Serbian Cyrillic: Јелена Брукс, née Миловановић; born 28 April 1989) is a Serbian professional women's basketball player for Sopron Basket. Standing at 1.91 m (6 ft 3 in), she plays at the power forward position. She also represents the Serbian national basketball team.

She formerly played for the WNBA's Washington Mystics. She was a second-leading scorer of 2012–13 EuroLeague Women.

== International career ==
She represented Serbian national basketball team at the EuroBasket 2015 in Budapest where they won the gold medal, and qualified for the 2016 Olympics, first in the history for the Serbian team.

== Achievements ==
- Euroleague: 2010-11 runner-up with WBC Spartak Moscow Region
- EuroCup: 2013-14 runner-up with Dynamo Kursk

== Personal life ==
Her mother is Ljubica Milovanović, former basketball player, and her brother is Nenad, basketball coach. She is married to David Brooks.

== See also ==
- List of Serbian WNBA players

Sporting positions
Preceded by Milica Dabović	Serbia captain 2017 – present	Succeeded by Incumbent
