= MTK (basketball team) =

MTK is the basketball branch of Hungarian sports club Magyar Testgyakorlók Köre.

== Women's branch ==
MTK women's basketball team was founded is 1945, the other successor Vörös Meteor was founded in 1949, they merged in 1975 under the name MTK-VM. They dominated the Hungarian Championship through the 1960s with 9 titles between 1960 and 1970 (7 MTK and 2 Vörös Meteor). After the mergery they won two more championships in 1989 and 1991, appearing in the European Cup and the Ronchetti Cup. The team dissolved in 1997.

In 2013 the women's branch has been reinvented and they merged with the 21-times champion BSE under the name MTK-Budapest. In 2014–15 they finished at 10th (last) place, in 2015–16 they won the 2nd division, in 2016–17 they are playing in the top division again. In 2018–19 they finished at 12th (last) place, and they merged with TFSE, winner of the 2nd tier.

== Men's branch ==
The men's team has no great history, they appeared in the first division in the 1950s, then they merged with Kistext. In 2011 MTK was re-founded and started a partnership with Elite Basket, they play in Törökbálint in the second division.

== Titles ==
- Women
  - Hungarian Championship (16)
    - MTK: 1953, 1956, 1962, 1963, 1964, 1965, 1966, 1968, 1969, 1972
    - Vörös Meteor: 1958, 1961, 1970
    - MTK-VM: 1989, 1991
  - Hungarian Cup (9)
    - 1955, 1962, 1963, 1964, 1965, 1967, 1968, 1969, 1972
