= Zsófia Fegyverneky =

Hungarian basketball player

No. 4 – Sopron Basket
- Position: Point guard
- League: NB I/A

Personal information
- Born: September 29, 1984 (age 42) Pécs, Hungary
- Listed height: 5 ft 10 in (1.78 m)
- Listed weight: 125 lb (57 kg)

Zsófia Fegyverneky (born September 29, 1984) is a Hungarian basketball player for Sopron Basket and the Hungarian national team. She participated at the EuroBasket Women 2017.
