= Aréna Sopron =

- Previous logo

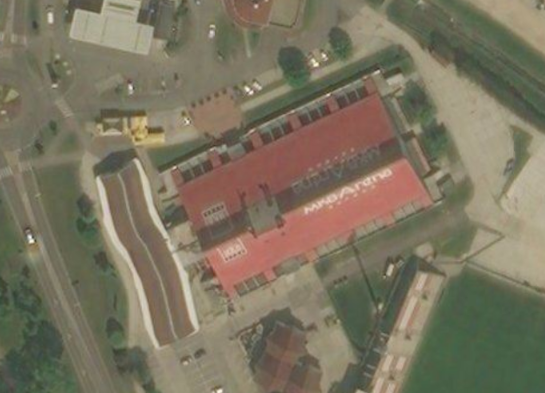
- Interactive map of Aréna Sopron
- Full name: Novomatic Musical Aréna Sopron
- Former names: MKB Aréna Sopron
- Location: Sopron, Hungary
- Coordinates: 47.6926°N 16.5831°E
- Operator: Raabersport Kft.
- Capacity: 2,500 (basketball)
- Surface: Parquette

Construction
- Opened: 1987
- Renovated: 2005
- Architect: Ferenc Kangyal

Tenants
- UNIQA Sopron; Soproni KC

Website
- www.novomaticarenasopron.hu

Aréna Sopron (official sponsored name Novomatic Musical Aréna Sopron, previously MKB Aréna) is a multi-purpose indoor arena in Sopron, Hungary. Its best known tenant is the women's basketball club UNIQA Sopron, one of the top teams of the Hungarian championship. They also play in the EuroLeague Women where they have reached the Final Four in 2009. The arena hosts other indoor sports as well as cultural events, exhibitions, shows, and musicals. In addition, it features a hotel, a restaurant, and a fitness center.

In 2005, the managing company of Uniqua Euroleasing Sopron, Raabersport Kft. acquired the operating rights of the arena, and completely renovated it.

== Events ==
- Ligno Novum Wood Tech Expo
- 2006 FIBA Europe Women's Under-20 European Championship
- 2015 FIBA Europe Women's European Championship
