= Lauber Dezső Sports Hall =

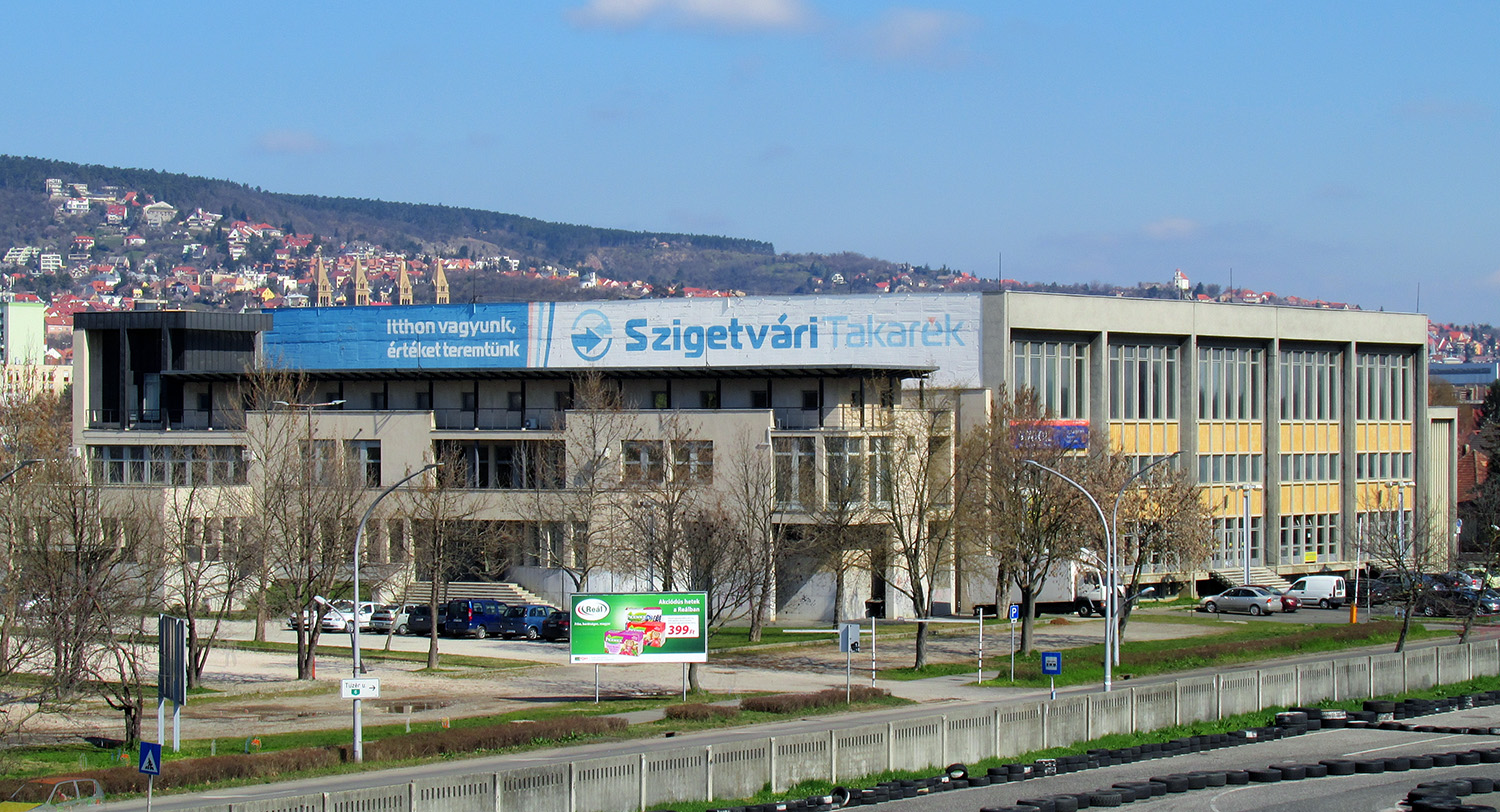
- Interactive map of Lauber Dezső Sports Hall
- Location: Pécs, Hungary
- Coordinates: 46°3′52″N 18°12′39″E
- Owner: Pécs
- Capacity: 3000

Construction
- Opened: 1976
- Renovated: 1997

Tenants
- PEAC-Pécs; PVSK Panthers

The Lauber Dezső Sports Hall is a sports hall in Pécs named after Dezső Lauber. This is the home of both Hungarian Championship A participant women's and men's basketball team of the city: PEAC-Pécs and PVSK-Pannonpower (and was the home of the former women's basketball club Pécs 2010.) It hosted the EuroBasket 1997 Women group stage and EuroLeague Women 2003–04 final four.

Besides sport events, it also hosts other type of events. Mostly Hungarian performers have concerts, but international performers like Gilbert Bécaud have hit the stage. In 2008 Ole Nydahl buddhist lama has held presentation.

Address: Dr. Veress Endre street 10.
