= Ágnes Studer =

Hungarian basketball player

No. 9 – NKA Pécs
- Position: Point guard
- League: NB I/A

Personal information
- Born: September 10, 1998 (age 28) Szekszárd, Hungary
- Listed height: 5 ft 6 in (1.68 m)
- Listed weight: 156 lb (71 kg)

Ágnes Studer (born September 10, 1998) is a Hungarian basketball player for NKA Pécs and the Hungarian national team.

She participated at the EuroBasket Women 2019.
