= PEAC-Pécs =

PEAC-PÉCS
- Founded: 1923
- Arena: Lauber Dezső Sports Hall
- Location: Pécs
- Team colors: Black, white
- Head coach: Željko Đokić
- Website: www.peacpecs.hu

PEAC-Pécs is the first-class women basketball team of Pécs, Hungary. The team started in the Hungarian Championship division A in 2012/2013 season. Beside the Hungarian Championship the team also attending the Hungarian Cup and the MŽRKL also known as the Women's Adriatic League.

== The Team ==
Number	Name	Position	Date of birth	Height	Weight
	Željko Đokić	Head coach	1993.11.28.		
	Imreh Ajtony	secondary coach	1995.04.15.		
	Lukács Béla	fizikoterapeut	1994.06.24.		
No. 4	Balla Dorottya	3–4	1994.04.02.	183 CM	70 kg
No. 5	Czirják Noémi	1	1993.07.27.	172 CM	66 kg
No. 6	Czukor Tünde	3–4	1984.09.27.	183 CM	71 kg
No. 7	Sánta Petra	1	1995.07.19.	170 CM	63 kg
No. 8	Fűrész Diána	1–2	1984.01.15.	173 CM	67 kg
No. 9	Csutorás Fanni	2–3	1994.11.17.	180 CM	70 kg
No. 10	Latinka Dušanić	3–4	1990.02.14.	180 CM	72 kg
No. 12	Horváth Lilla	3–4	1990.12.04.	183 CM	74 kg
No. 13	Barbour Andrea Martikams	1–2	1989.02.03.	180 CM	72 kg
No. 14	Raus Vivien	2–3	1995.11.24.	175 CM	60 kg
No. 15	Szamosi Amadea Dóra	4–5	1994.02.01.	189 CM	75 kg
No. 16	Szűcs Réka	1	1995.04.28.	169 CM	57 kg
No. 20	Demeter Hanna	3	1994.11.21.	183 CM	
No. 21	Hutlassa Fanni	3	1988.12.08	183 CM	
No. 22	Amy Betsy Jaeschke	5	1989.04.26.	196 CM	100 kg
No. 23	Kiss Virág	5	1998.04.12.	193 CM	85 kg
