= EuroBasket Women 2021 squads =

This article displays the rosters for the teams competing at the EuroBasket Women 2021. Each team had to submit 12 players.

== Group A ==
=== Belarus ===
The roster was announced on 12 June 2021.

Belarus women's national basketball team roster
Players
Coaches

Pos.	No.	Name	Age – Date of birth	Height	Club	Ctr.
SG	4	Alena Karasevich	27 – 4 April 1994	1.79 m (5 ft 10 in)	Olimpia Grodno	(Belarus)
PG	5	Aliaksandra Tarasava	32 – 23 June 1988	1.72 m (5 ft 8 in)	TK Hannover	(Germany)
SF	7	Yuliya Rytsikava	34 – 8 September 1986	1.80 m (5 ft 11 in)	Horizont Minsk	(Belarus)
SG	8	Tatsiana Likhtarovich	33 – 29 March 1988	1.80 m (5 ft 11 in)	Basket Esch	(Luxembourg)
PG	9	Volha Ziuzkova	38 – 14 June 1983	1.71 m (5 ft 7 in)	Horizont Minsk	(Belarus)
PF	10	Anastasiya Verameyenka	33 – 10 July 1987	1.92 m (6 ft 4 in)	Horizont Minsk	(Belarus)
PF	13	Maryia Papova	26 – 13 July 1994	1.88 m (6 ft 2 in)	UMMC Ekaterinburg	(Russia)
G	17	Yuliya Vasilevich	19 – 21 June 2001	1.72 m (5 ft 8 in)	Olimpia Grodno	(Belarus)
PF	18	Hanna Brych	24 – 8 March 1997	1.86 m (6 ft 1 in)	Kazanochka Kazan	(Russia)
PG	20	Alex Bentley	30 – 27 October 1990	1.73 m (5 ft 8 in)	Dynamo Kursk	(Russia)
C	21	Viktoryia Hasper	33 – 9 January 1988	1.92 m (6 ft 4 in)	Horizont Minsk	(Belarus)
SF	23	Yanina Inkina	23 – 16 October 1997	1.86 m (6 ft 1 in)	Horizont Minsk	(Belarus)

Head coach

- (Belarus) Nataliya Trafimava

Assistant coach(es)

- (Belarus) Aliaksei Pyntsikau
- (Bosnia and Herzegovina) Zlatan Prešić

Legend

- Club – describes last
  club before the tournament
- Age – describes age
  on 17 June 2021

=== Slovakia ===
The roster was announced on 15 June 2021.

Slovakia women's national basketball team roster
Players
Coaches

Pos.	No.	Name	Age – Date of birth	Height	Club	Ctr.
C	3	Ivana Jakubcová	26 – 20 August 1994	1.97 m (6 ft 6 in)	Basket Femminile Le Mura	(Italy)
PF	4	Veronika Remenárová	24 – 16 March 1997	1.86 m (6 ft 1 in)	KP Brno	(Czech Republic)
PG	5	Radka Stašová	24 – 14 May 1997	1.69 m (5 ft 7 in)	MBK Ružomberok	(Slovakia)
PG	6	Timea Sujová	37 – 26 February 1984	1.72 m (5 ft 8 in)	ŠBK Šamorín	(Slovakia)
SG	8	Natália Martišková	22 – 14 June 1999	1.70 m (5 ft 7 in)	Piešťanské Čajky	(Slovakia)
SF	9	Terézia Páleníková	25 – 16 August 1995	1.78 m (5 ft 10 in)	Piešťanské Čajky	(Slovakia)
PF	11	Sabína Oroszová	28 – 5 June 1993	1.92 m (6 ft 4 in)	Uni Győr	(Hungary)
G	13	Miroslava Praženicová	24 – 2 June 1997	1.83 m (6 ft 0 in)	MBK Ružomberok	(Slovakia)
PF	14	Michaela Fekete	26 – 28 July 1994	1.88 m (6 ft 2 in)	Dinamo Lab	(Italy)
PG	15	Nikola Kováčiková	22 – 6 January 1999	1.80 m (5 ft 11 in)	Penn Quakers	(United States)
C	16	Alica Moravčíková	26 – 5 December 1994	1.90 m (6 ft 3 in)	USC Heidelberg	(Germany)
PG	77	Nikola Dudášová	26 – 17 March 1995	1.78 m (5 ft 10 in)	PEAC-Pécs	(Hungary)

Head coach

- (Slovakia) Juraj Suja

Assistant coach(es)

- (Slovakia) Peter Jankovič

Legend

- Club – describes last
  club before the tournament
- Age – describes age
  on 17 June 2021

=== Spain ===
The roster was announced on 9 June 2021.

Spain women's national basketball team roster
Players
Coaches

Pos.	No.	Name	Age – Date of birth	Height	Club	Ctr.
PG	5	Cristina Ouviña	30 – 18 September 1990	1.73 m (5 ft 8 in)	Valencia Basket	(Spain)
G	6	Sílvia Domínguez	34 – 31 January 1987	1.65 m (5 ft 5 in)	Perfumerías Avenida	(Spain)
PG	9	Laia Palau	41 – 10 September 1979	1.78 m (5 ft 10 in)	Uni Girona CB	(Spain)
SG	11	Leonor Rodríguez	29 – 21 October 1991	1.80 m (5 ft 11 in)	Perfumerías Avenida	(Spain)
PG	12	Maite Cazorla	23 – 18 June 1997	1.78 m (5 ft 10 in)	Perfumerías Avenida	(Spain)
C	14	Raquel Carrera	19 – 31 October 2001	1.90 m (6 ft 3 in)	Valencia Basket	(Spain)
SF	18	Queralt Casas	28 – 18 November 1992	1.80 m (5 ft 11 in)	Valencia Basket	(Spain)
C	20	Paula Ginzo	23 – 16 February 1998	1.89 m (6 ft 2 in)	Lointek Gernika Bizkaia	(Spain)
SF	22	María Conde	24 – 14 January 1997	1.86 m (6 ft 1 in)	USK Praha	(Czech Republic)
C	24	Laura Gil	29 – 24 April 1992	1.90 m (6 ft 3 in)	Valencia Basket	(Spain)
SF	33	Laura Quevedo	27 – 15 April 1994	1.83 m (6 ft 0 in)	CB Estudiantes	(Spain)
C	45	Astou Ndour	26 – 22 August 1994	1.98 m (6 ft 6 in)	Hatay BB	(Turkey)

Head coach

- (Spain) Lucas Mondelo

Assistant coach(es)

- (Spain) Roberto Hernández
- (Spain) Madelén Urieta

Legend

- Club – describes last
  club before the tournament
- Age – describes age
  on 17 June 2021

=== Sweden ===
The roster was announced on 12 June 2021.

Sweden women's national basketball team roster
Players
Coaches

Pos.	No.	Name	Age – Date of birth	Height	Club	Ctr.
PF	4	Nathalie Fontaine	27 – 3 October 1993	1.88 m (6 ft 2 in)	Olympiacos	(Greece)
F	5	Kalis Loyd	32 – 5 April 1989	1.84 m (6 ft 0 in)	Toulouse	(France)
SG	6	Frida Eldebrink	33 – 4 January 1988	1.75 m (5 ft 9 in)	Uni Girona CB	(Spain)
PG	7	Klara Lundquist	21 – 28 August 1999	1.73 m (5 ft 8 in)	Arka Gdynia	(Poland)
F	8	Ellen Nyström	27 – 15 September 1993	1.85 m (6 ft 1 in)	Luleå Basket	(Sweden)
G	9	Elin Eldebrink	33 – 4 January 1988	1.70 m (5 ft 7 in)	Tango Bourges Basket	(France)
F	10	Binta Drammeh	29 – 21 May 1992	1.81 m (5 ft 11 in)	Uni Girona CB	(Spain)
F	12	Matilda Ekh	19 – 19 April 2002	1.82 m (6 ft 0 in)	Luleå Basket	(Sweden)
SG	16	Stephanie Visscher	22 – 4 March 1999	1.80 m (5 ft 11 in)	Stephen F. Austin Ladyjacks	(United States)
C	22	Emma Johansson	17 – 28 August 2003	1.87 m (6 ft 2 in)	Wetterbygden Sparks	(Sweden)
C	24	Paulina Hersler	27 – 16 May 1994	1.90 m (6 ft 3 in)	Pallacanestro Battipaglia	(Italy)
F	58	Allis Nyström	27 – 12 December 1993	1.84 m (6 ft 0 in)	Luleå Basket	(Sweden)

Head coach

- (Italy) Marco Crespi

Assistant coaches

- (Sweden) Viktor Bengtsson
- (Sweden) Mats Levin

Legend

- Club – describes last
  club before the tournament
- Age – describes age
  on 17 June 2021

== Group B ==
=== Greece ===
The roster was announced on 9 June 2021.

Greece women's national basketball team roster
Players
Coaches

Pos.	No.	Name	Age – Date of birth	Height	Club	Ctr.
PG	4	Anna Niki Stamolamprou	25 – 26 August 1995	1.70 m (5 ft 7 in)	Olympiacos	(Greece)
F	5	Eleni Bosgana	17 – 4 December 2003	1.88 m (6 ft 2 in)	ACS Athens	(Greece)
PG	6	Dionysia Alexandri	31 – 24 October 1989	1.70 m (5 ft 7 in)	Olympiacos	(Greece)
PG	8	Pinelopi Pavlopoulou	25 – 3 March 1996	1.72 m (5 ft 8 in)	ACS Sepsi	(Romania)
PG	11	Angeliki Nikolopoulou	30 – 2 May 1991	1.74 m (5 ft 9 in)	Olympiacos	(Greece)
PF	12	Katerina Sotiriou	37 – 3 January 1984	1.86 m (6 ft 1 in)	VBW CEKK Cegléd	(Hungary)
C	13	Vasiliki Louka	24 – 5 July 1996	1.92 m (6 ft 4 in)	A3 Basket	(Sweden)
PF	15	Artemis Spanou	28 – 1 January 1993	1.86 m (6 ft 1 in)	CCC Polkowice	(Poland)
SF	19	Christina Anastasopoulou	18 – 25 November 2002	1.82 m (6 ft 0 in)	Proteas Voulas B.C.	(Greece)
G	23	Elena Tsineke	21 – 11 July 1999	1.76 m (5 ft 9 in)	Lefkadas BC	(Greece)
SG	26	Ioanna Diela	31 – 2 June 1990	1.81 m (5 ft 11 in)	Panathinaikos	(Greece)
C	34	Mariella Fasoula	23 – 2 September 1997	1.92 m (6 ft 4 in)	CB Avenida	(Spain)

Head coach

- (Greece) Vasileios Maslarinos

Assistant coach(es)

- (Greece) Dimitra Kalentzou
- (Greece) Athanasios Niklas

Legend

- Club – describes last
  club before the tournament
- Age – describes age
  on 17 June 2021

=== Italy ===
The roster was announced on 14 June 2021.

Italy women's national basketball team roster
Players
Coaches

Pos.	No.	Name	Age – Date of birth	Height	Club	Ctr.
SF	0	Jasmine Keys	23 – 8 October 1997	1.90 m (6 ft 3 in)	Beretta Famila Schio	(Italy)
PG	3	Nicole Romeo	31 – 29 August 1989	1.66 m (5 ft 5 in)	Virtus Eirene Ragusa	(Italy)
C	4	Martina Bestagno	30 – 14 August 1990	1.89 m (6 ft 2 in)	Reyer Venezia	(Italy)
PG	5	Debora Carangelo	29 – 10 February 1992	1.67 m (5 ft 6 in)	Reyer Venezia	(Italy)
SF	9	Cecilia Zandalasini	25 – 16 March 1996	1.85 m (6 ft 1 in)	Fenerbahçe	(Turkey)
SG	11	Francesca Pan	24 – 27 May 1997	1.80 m (5 ft 11 in)	Reyer Venezia	(Italy)
SF	13	Valeria De Pretto	29 – 16 November 1991	1.85 m (6 ft 1 in)	Beretta Famila Schio	(Italy)
C	22	Olbis Andrè	22 – 25 December 1998	1.92 m (6 ft 4 in)	Beretta Famila Schio	(Italy)
C	23	Sabrina Cinili	32 – 22 April 1989	1.91 m (6 ft 3 in)	Beretta Famila Schio	(Italy)
PG	30	Beatrice Attura	26 – 5 November 1994	1.70 m (5 ft 7 in)	Reyer Venezia	(Italy)
C	31	Lorela Cubaj	22 – 8 January 1999	1.93 m (6 ft 4 in)	Georgia Tech Yellow Jackets	(United States)
C	41	Elisa Penna	25 – 13 November 1995	1.91 m (6 ft 3 in)	Reyer Venezia	(Italy)

Head coach

- (Italy) Lino Lardo

Assistant coach(es)

- (Italy) Giovanni Lucchesi
- (Italy) Massimo Romano

Legend

- Club – describes last
  club before the tournament
- Age – describes age
  on 17 June 2021

=== Montenegro ===
The roster was announced on 11 June 2021.

Montenegro women's national basketball team roster
Players
Coaches

Pos.	No.	Name	Age – Date of birth	Height	Club	Ctr.
PF	1	Jelena Dubljević	34 – 7 May 1987	1.91 m (6 ft 3 in)	Elazığ İl Özel İdarespor	(Turkey)
F	5	Jovana Pašić	29 – 12 May 1992	1.83 m (6 ft 0 in)	ACS Sepsi SIC	(Romania)
SG	8	Dragana Živković	20 – 23 January 2001	1.79 m (5 ft 10 in)	ŽKK Budućnost Podgorica	(Montenegro)
PG	9	Snežana Aleksić	32 – 14 January 1989	1.73 m (5 ft 8 in)	WBC Montana 2003	(Bulgaria)
PF	10	Kristina Raković	26 – 26 September 1994	1.85 m (6 ft 1 in)	Club Bàsquet Santfeliuenc	(Spain)
PG	11	Božica Mujović	25 – 7 January 1996	1.76 m (5 ft 9 in)	PINKK-Pécsi 424	(Hungary)
G	12	Milena Jakšić	22 – 27 December 1998	1.83 m (6 ft 0 in)	ŽKK Budućnost Podgorica	(Montenegro)
PF	13	Bojana Kovačević	24 – 16 October 1996	1.86 m (6 ft 1 in)	Campus Promete	(Spain)
C	19	Violeta Lazarević	24 – 13 June 1997	1.90 m (6 ft 3 in)	ŽKK Budućnost Podgorica	(Montenegro)
PG	25	Marija Leković	17 – 21 July 2003	1.66 m (5 ft 5 in)	ŽKK Budućnost Podgorica	(Montenegro)
F	30	Milica Jovanović	31 – 14 August 1989	1.89 m (6 ft 2 in)	İzmit Belediyespor	(Turkey)
C	34	Markeisha Gatling	28 – 14 July 1992	1.96 m (6 ft 5 in)	Nadezhda Orenburg	(Russia)

Head coach

- (Montenegro) Jelena Škerović

Assistant coach(es)

- (Montenegro) Dušan Dubljević

Legend

- Club – describes last
  club before the tournament
- Age – describes age
  on 17 June 2021

=== Serbia ===
The roster was announced on 15 June 2021.

Serbia women's national basketball team roster
Players
Coaches

Pos.	No.	Name	Age – Date of birth	Height	Club	Ctr.
SF	5	Sonja Vasić	32 – 18 February 1989	1.89 m (6 ft 2 in)	Spar Girona	(Spain)
SG	6	Saša Čađo	31 – 13 July 1989	1.78 m (5 ft 10 in)	Carolo Basket	(France)
SG	8	Nevena Jovanović	30 – 30 June 1990	1.79 m (5 ft 10 in)	Sopron Basket	(Hungary)
PF	9	Jelena Brooks	32 – 28 April 1989	1.90 m (6 ft 3 in)	Sopron Basket	(Hungary)
G	10	Dajana Butulija	35 – 23 February 1986	1.75 m (5 ft 9 in)
PF	11	Aleksandra Crvendakić	25 – 17 March 1996	1.87 m (6 ft 2 in)	ASVEL Féminin	(France)
PG	12	Yvonne Anderson	31 – 8 March 1990	1.75 m (5 ft 9 in)	Reyer Venezia	(Italy)
SG	23	Ana Dabović	31 – 18 August 1989	1.83 m (6 ft 0 in)	Basket Lattes	(France)
PF	24	Maja Škorić	31 – 11 October 1989	1.84 m (6 ft 0 in)	KSC Szekszárd	(Hungary)
SF	25	Maša Janković	21 – 1 February 2000	1.87 m (6 ft 2 in)	ŽKK Crvena zvezda	(Serbia)
PF	32	Angela Dugalić	19 – 29 December 2001	1.93 m (6 ft 4 in)	Oregon Ducks	(United States)
C	33	Tina Krajišnik	30 – 12 January 1991	1.90 m (6 ft 3 in)	Galatasaray	(Turkey)

Head coach

- (Serbia) Marina Maljković

Assistant coach(es)

- (Serbia) Miloš Pađen
- (Serbia) Vladimir Vuksanović

Legend

- Club – describes last
  club before the tournament
- Age – describes age
  on 17 June 2021

== Group C ==
=== Belgium ===
The roster was announced on 6 June 2021.

Belgium women's national basketball team roster
Players
Coaches

Pos.	No.	Name	Age – Date of birth	Height	Club	Ctr.
SG	5	Kim Mestdagh	31 – 12 March 1990	1.80 m (5 ft 11 in)	PF Schio	(Italy)
SF	6	Antonia Delaere	26 – 1 August 1994	1.82 m (6 ft 0 in)	IDK Euskotren	(Spain)
PG	9	Marjorie Carpréaux	33 – 17 September 1987	1.64 m (5 ft 5 in)	Castors Braine	(Belgium)
PF	11	Emma Meesseman	28 – 13 May 1993	1.93 m (6 ft 4 in)	UMMC Ekaterinburg	(Russia)
C	13	Kyara Linskens	24 – 13 November 1996	1.93 m (6 ft 4 in)	Magnolia Campobasso	(Italy)
F	22	Hanne Mestdagh	28 – 19 April 1993	1.78 m (5 ft 10 in)	Namur-Capitale	(Belgium)
C	23	Serena-Lynn Geldof	24 – 2 March 1997	1.96 m (6 ft 5 in)	Campus Promete	(Spain)
C	25	Becky Massey	21 – 21 March 2000	1.86 m (6 ft 1 in)	Kangoeroes Basket Mechelen	(Belgium)
F	32	Heleen Nauwelaers	25 – 14 March 1996	1.80 m (5 ft 11 in)	CDB Clarinos Tenerife	(Spain)
C	34	Billie Massey	21 – 21 March 2000	1.86 m (6 ft 1 in)	Kangoeroes Basket Mechelen	(Belgium)
PG	35	Julie Vanloo	28 – 10 February 1993	1.68 m (5 ft 6 in)	Basket Zaragoza	(Spain)
PG	55	Julie Allemand	24 – 7 July 1996	1.74 m (5 ft 9 in)	Lyon ASVEL	(France)

Head coach

- (Belgium) Philip Mestdagh

Assistant coach(es)

- (Belgium) Sven Van Camp
- (Belgium) Pierre Cornia

Legend

- Club – describes last
  club before the tournament
- Age – describes age
  on 17 June 2021

=== Bosnia and Herzegovina ===
Bosnia and Herzegovina women's national basketball team roster
Players
Coaches

Pos.	No.	Name	Age – Date of birth	Height	Club	Ctr.
PG	4	Milica Deura	30 – 22 July 1990	1.78 m (5 ft 10 in)	Rutronik Stars Keltern	(Germany)
PG	5	Miljana Džombeta	26 – 5 July 1994	1.75 m (5 ft 9 in)	ZTE Női Kosárlabda Klub	(Hungary)
G	7	Nikolina Babić	26 – 16 February 1995	1.77 m (5 ft 10 in)	ŽKK Budućnost Podgorica	(Montenegro)
G	9	Dragana Domuzin	20 – 3 November 2000	1.74 m (5 ft 9 in)	Herner TC	(Germany)
PF	10	Marica Gajić	26 – 27 April 1995	1.85 m (6 ft 1 in)	Flammes Carolo Basket Ardennes	(France)
SG	11	Nikolina Delić	24 – 1 November 1996	1.84 m (6 ft 0 in)	ŽKD Ježica	(Slovenia)
PF	13	Melisa Brčaninović	22 – 19 February 1999	1.93 m (6 ft 4 in)	Lointek Gernika Bizkaia	(Spain)
PF	15	Nikolina Džebo	25 – 11 August 1995	1.86 m (6 ft 1 in)	ZKK Feniks Banja Luka	(Bosnia and Herzegovina)
PG	21	Irena Vrančić	31 – 21 March 1990	1.73 m (5 ft 8 in)	Horizont Minsk	(Belarus)
SG	24	Matea Tavić	29 – 29 May 1992	1.78 m (5 ft 10 in)	Rutronik Stars Keltern	(Germany)
SG	25	Anđela Delić	24 – 1 November 1996	1.81 m (5 ft 11 in)	WBC Beroe	(Bulgaria)
C	35	Jonquel Jones	27 – 5 January 1994	1.98 m (6 ft 6 in)	UMMC Ekaterinburg	(Russia)

Head coach

- (Bosnia and Herzegovina) Goran Lojo

Assistant coach(es)

- (Bosnia and Herzegovina) Armin Sečerović

Legend

- Club – describes last
  club before the tournament
- Age – describes age
  on 17 June 2021

=== Slovenia ===
The roster was announced on 14 June 2021.

Slovenia women's national basketball team roster
Players
Coaches

Pos.	No.	Name	Age – Date of birth	Height	Club	Ctr.
C	1	Eva Lisec	26 – 17 June 1995	1.92 m (6 ft 4 in)	Dynamo Kursk	(Russia)
SG	3	Teja Oblak	30 – 20 December 1990	1.72 m (5 ft 8 in)	ZVVZ USK Praha	(Czech Republic)
G	6	Aleksandra Krošelj	22 – 25 February 1999	1.72 m (5 ft 8 in)	Kangoeroes Basket Mechelen	(Belgium)
PF	7	Maruša Seničar	24 – 5 May 1997	1.87 m (6 ft 2 in)	Cinkarna Celje	(Slovenia)
C	8	Teja Goršič	21 – 7 July 1999	1.89 m (6 ft 2 in)	TK Hannover	(Germany)
F	9	Annamaria Prezelj	23 – 30 July 1997	1.75 m (5 ft 9 in)	Quesos El Pastor	(Spain)
PF	10	Tina Jakovina	28 – 11 August 1992	1.82 m (6 ft 0 in)	Club Polideportivo Bembibre	(Spain)
SG	13	Zala Friškovec	21 – 10 October 1999	1.80 m (5 ft 11 in)	KSC Szekszárd	(Hungary)
SG	20	Lea Debeljak	19 – 25 October 2001	1.77 m (5 ft 10 in)	Cinkarna Celje	(Slovenia)
C	30	Shante Evans	29 – 8 July 1991	1.85 m (6 ft 1 in)	Perfumerias Avenida Salamanca	(Spain)
PF	31	Tina Trebec	31 – 10 March 1990	1.89 m (6 ft 2 in)	Montbrison Féminin	(France)
PG	92	Nika Barič	28 – 2 September 1992	1.69 m (5 ft 7 in)	Dynamo Kursk	(Russia)

Head coach

- (Slovenia) Damir Grgić

Assistant coach(es)

- (Slovenia) Alojzij Duščak
- (Slovenia) Jure Krajnc

Legend

- Club – describes last
  club before the tournament
- Age – describes age
  on 17 June 2021

=== Turkey ===
The roster was announced on 15 June 2021.

Turkey women's national basketball team roster
Players
Coaches

Pos.	No.	Name	Age – Date of birth	Height	Club	Ctr.
PG	1	Pelin Bilgiç	26 – 15 July 1994	1.73 m (5 ft 8 in)	Galatasaray	(Turkey)
SG	2	Sevgi Uzun	23 – 25 November 1997	1.75 m (5 ft 9 in)	Fenerbahçe	(Turkey)
PG	4	Olcay Çakır Turgut	27 – 13 July 1993	1.82 m (6 ft 0 in)	Fenerbahçe	(Turkey)
SF	5	Melis Gülcan	25 – 28 May 1996	1.87 m (6 ft 2 in)	Kayseri Basketbol	(Turkey)
SF	9	Bahar Çağlar Ökten	32 – 28 September 1988	1.90 m (6 ft 3 in)	BOTAŞ	(Turkey)
PF	12	Tuğçe Canıtez	30 – 10 November 1990	1.88 m (6 ft 2 in)	Fenerbahçe	(Turkey)
C	13	Quanitra Hollingsworth	32 – 15 November 1988	1.97 m (6 ft 6 in)	Çukurova Basketbol	(Turkey)
PF	23	Meltem Yıldızhan	21 – 5 August 1999	1.88 m (6 ft 2 in)	Nesibe Aydın GSK	(Turkey)
C	24	İnci Güçlü	22 – 26 February 1999	2.05 m (6 ft 9 in)	İzmit Belediyespor	(Turkey)
PG	25	Alperi Onar	25 – 2 January 1996	1.70 m (5 ft 7 in)	Fenerbahçe	(Turkey)
C	33	Esra Ural Topuz	29 – 18 August 1991	1.98 m (6 ft 6 in)	Kayseri Basketbol	(Turkey)
SF	99	Gökşen Fitik	19 – 11 August 2001	1.75 m (5 ft 9 in)	Çukurova Basketbol	(Turkey)

Head coach

- (Turkey) Ceyhun Yıldızoğlu

Assistant coach(es)

- (Turkey) Erman Okerman
- (Turkey) Olcay Orak

Legend

- Club – describes last
  club before the tournament
- Age – describes age
  on 17 June 2021

== Group D ==
=== Croatia ===
The roster was announced on 14 June 2021.

Croatia women's national basketball team roster
Players
Coaches

Pos.	No.	Name	Age – Date of birth	Height	Club	Ctr.
PG	1	Karla Erjavec	22 – 17 June 1999	1.80 m (5 ft 11 in)	Miami Hurricanes	(United States)
F	2	Mia Mašić	28 – 4 April 1993	1.80 m (5 ft 11 in)	TK Hannover	(Germany)
PF	4	Ana-Marija Begić	27 – 17 January 1994	1.91 m (6 ft 3 in)	Arka Gdynia	(Poland)
SG	6	Iva Slonjšak	24 – 16 April 1997	1.83 m (6 ft 0 in)	Saint-Amand Hainaut Basket	(France)
C	7	Ivana Tikvić	27 – 20 March 1994	1.94 m (6 ft 4 in)	CDB Clarinos Tenerife	(Spain)
F	10	Andrijana Cvitković	27 – 28 April 1994	1.90 m (6 ft 3 in)	Club Baloncesto Zona Press	(Spain)
PG	11	Ana Petrak	22 – 27 July 1998	1.68 m (5 ft 6 in)	ŽKK Medveščak	(Croatia)
PF	14	Nina Premasunac	28 – 25 October 1992	1.88 m (6 ft 2 in)	Magnolia Campobasso	(Italy)
PG	18	Ivana Dojkić	23 – 24 December 1997	1.80 m (5 ft 11 in)	Virtus Segafredo Bologna	(Italy)
PG	19	Matea Tadić	22 – 25 October 1998	1.76 m (5 ft 9 in)	Piešťanské Čajky	(Slovakia)
PF	22	Lea Miletić	25 – 22 August 1995	1.83 m (6 ft 0 in)	Piešťanské Čajky	(Slovakia)
SG	24	Klaudia Periša	24 – 10 December 1996	1.80 m (5 ft 11 in)	Saarlouis Royals	(Germany)

Head coach

- (Croatia) Stipe Bralić

Assistant coach(es)

- (Croatia) Iva Borović
- (Croatia) Goran Gunjević

Legend

- Club – describes last
  club before the tournament
- Age – describes age
  on 17 June 2021

=== Czech Republic ===
The roster was announced on 12 June 2021.

Czech Republic women's national basketball team roster
Players
Coaches

Pos.	No.	Name	Age – Date of birth	Height	Club	Ctr.
SG	0	Renáta Březinová	31 – 6 January 1990	1.85 m (6 ft 1 in)	KP Brno	(Czech Republic)
SF	4	Gabriela Andělová	25 – 21 March 1996	1.73 m (5 ft 8 in)	Saarlouis Royals	(Germany)
SG	5	Romana Hejdová	33 – 9 May 1988	1.80 m (5 ft 11 in)	Basket Landes	(France)
SG	6	Kristýna Brabencová	21 – 16 December 1999	1.81 m (5 ft 11 in)	USK Praha	(Czech Republic)
PF	7	Alena Hanušová	30 – 29 May 1991	1.91 m (6 ft 3 in)	Bretagne Basket	(France)
SG	8	Veronika Voráčková	21 – 21 June 1999	1.80 m (5 ft 11 in)	USK Praha	(Czech Republic)
PG	10	Eliška Hamzová	20 – 10 January 2001	1.82 m (6 ft 0 in)	BK Brno	(Czech Republic)
SF	11	Kateřina Elhotová	31 – 14 October 1989	1.80 m (5 ft 11 in)	USK Praha	(Czech Republic)
PG	12	Tereza Vyoralová	27 – 16 January 1994	1.76 m (5 ft 9 in)	USK Praha	(Czech Republic)
C	18	Natálie Stoupalová	22 – 13 July 1998	1.85 m (6 ft 1 in)	BK Brno	(Czech Republic)
G	21	Veronika Šípová	22 – 20 March 1999	1.81 m (5 ft 11 in)	USK Praha	(Czech Republic)
C	44	Julia Reisingerová	23 – 17 April 1998	1.94 m (6 ft 4 in)	Uni Girona CB	(Spain)

Head coach

- (Czech Republic) Štefan Svitek

Assistant coach(es)

- (Czech Republic) Ivan Beneš
- (Czech Republic) Veronika Bortelová

Legend

- Club – describes last
  club before the tournament
- Age – describes age
  on 17 June 2021

=== France ===
The roster was announced on 2 June 2021.

France women's national basketball team roster
Players
Coaches

Pos.	No.	Name	Age – Date of birth	Height	Club	Ctr.
PG	0	Olivia Époupa	27 – 30 April 1994	1.64 m (5 ft 5 in)	Charnay Basket	(France)
PF	5	Endéné Miyem	33 – 15 May 1988	1.88 m (6 ft 2 in)	Flammes Carolo	(France)
PF	6	Alexia Chartereau	22 – 5 September 1998	1.90 m (6 ft 3 in)	Tango Bourges Basket	(France)
C	7	Sandrine Gruda	33 – 25 June 1987	1.93 m (6 ft 4 in)	PF Schio	(Italy)
C	8	Héléna Ciak	31 – 15 December 1989	1.97 m (6 ft 6 in)	ASVEL Féminin	(France)
SG	10	Sarah Michel	32 – 10 January 1989	1.80 m (5 ft 11 in)	Tango Bourges Basket	(France)
SF	11	Valériane Vukosavljević	27 – 29 April 1994	1.84 m (6 ft 0 in)	Basket Lattes	(France)
C	12	Iliana Rupert	19 – 12 July 2001	1.94 m (6 ft 4 in)	Tango Bourges Basket	(France)
F	15	Gabby Williams	24 – 9 September 1996	1.80 m (5 ft 11 in)	Sopron Basket	(Hungary)
SG	23	Marine Johannès	26 – 21 January 1995	1.77 m (5 ft 10 in)	ASVEL Féminin	(France)
PG	39	Alix Duchet	23 – 30 December 1997	1.68 m (5 ft 6 in)	Tango Bourges Basket	(France)
SF	93	Diandra Tchatchouang	30 – 14 June 1991	1.89 m (6 ft 2 in)	Basket Lattes	(France)

Head coach

- (France) Valérie Garnier

Assistant coach(es)

- (France) Grégory Halin
- (France) Olivier Lafargue

Legend

- Club – describes last
  club before the tournament
- Age – describes age
  on 17 June 2021

=== Russia ===
The roster was announced on 11 June 2021.

Russia women's national basketball team roster
Players
Coaches

Pos.	No.	Name	Age – Date of birth	Height	Club	Ctr.
SG	1	Daria Kurilchuk	23 – 14 February 1998	1.81 m (5 ft 11 in)	BC Enisey	(Russia)
SF	4	Raisa Musina	23 – 31 March 1998	1.90 m (6 ft 3 in)	Dynamo Kursk	(Russia)
G	5	Marina Goldyreva	27 – 19 June 1993	1.69 m (5 ft 7 in)	WBC Dynamo Novosibirsk	(Russia)
SF	6	Kamilla Ogun	22 – 7 May 1999	1.81 m (5 ft 11 in)	BC Namur-Capitale	(Belgium)
C	7	Maria Vadeeva	22 – 16 July 1998	1.93 m (6 ft 4 in)	UMMC Ekaterinburg	(Russia)
PG	8	Ekaterina Fedorenkova	27 – 12 August 1993	1.77 m (5 ft 10 in)	NIKA Syktyvkar	(Russia)
SF	10	Anastasia Shilova	30 – 10 January 1991	1.86 m (6 ft 1 in)	Nadezhda Orenburg	(Russia)
SG	22	Elizaveta Komarova	26 – 1 February 1995	1.74 m (5 ft 9 in)	Nadezhda Orenburg	(Russia)
PF	55	Nina Glonti	24 – 14 January 1997	1.89 m (6 ft 2 in)	MBA Moscow	(Russia)
C	63	Aleksandra Shtanko	30 – 21 February 1991	1.91 m (6 ft 3 in)	MBA Moscow	(Russia)
C	97	Elizaveta Shabanova	23 – 7 December 1997	1.97 m (6 ft 6 in)	Dynamo Kursk	(Russia)
PG	99	Kseniia Levchenko	25 – 29 March 1996	1.67 m (5 ft 6 in)	Sparta & K	(Russia)

Head coach

- (Russia) Alexander Kovalev

Assistant coach(es)

- (Russia) Alexander Vasin
- (Russia) Dmitry Shumikhin

Legend

- Club – describes last
  club before the tournament
- Age – describes age
  on 17 June 2021
