= Belarus at the 2016 Summer Olympics =

- IOC code: BLR
- NOC: Belarus Olympic Committee
- Website: www.noc.by (in Russian and English)

in Rio de Janeiro
- Competitors: 124 in 21 sports
- Flag bearers: Vasil Kiryienka (opening); Ivan Tsikhan (closing)
- Medals Ranked 40th: Gold 1 Silver 4 Bronze 4 Total 9

Summer Olympics appearances (overview)
- 1996; 2000; 2004; 2008; 2012; 2016; 2020; 2024; 2028

Other related appearances
- Russian Empire (1900–1912); Poland (1924–1936); Soviet Union (1952–1988); Unified Team (1992); Individual Neutral Athletes (2024)

Belarus competed at the 2016 Summer Olympics in Rio de Janeiro, Brazil, from 5 to 21 August 2016. It was the nation's sixth consecutive appearance at the Summer Olympics in the post-Soviet era.

== Medalists ==
Medal	Name	Sport	Event	Date
Gold	Uladzislau Hancharou	Gymnastics	Men's trampoline	13 August
Silver	Darya Naumava	Weightlifting	Women's 75 kg	12 August
Silver	Vadzim Straltsou	Weightlifting	Men's 94 kg	13 August
Silver	Maryia Mamashuk	Wrestling	Women's 63 kg	18 August
Silver	Ivan Tsikhan	Athletics	Men's hammer throw	19 August
Bronze	Aliaksandra Herasimenia	Swimming	Women's 50 m freestyle	13 August
Bronze	Javid Hamzatau	Wrestling	Men's Greco-Roman 85 kg	15 August
Bronze	Ibrahim Saidau	Wrestling	Men's freestyle 125 kg	20 August
Bronze	Marharyta Makhneva; Nadzeya Liapeshka; Volha Khudzenka; Maryna Litvinchuk	Canoeing	Women's K-4 500 m	20 August

Medals by sport
Sport	1st place, gold medalist(s)	2nd place, silver medalist(s)	3rd place, bronze medalist(s)	Total
Gymnastics	1	0	0	1
Weightlifting	0	2	0	2
Wrestling	0	1	2	3
Athletics	0	1	0	1
Canoeing	0	0	1	1
Swimming	0	0	1	1
Total	1	4	4	9

== Competitors ==
The following is the list of number of competitors participating in the Games. Note that reserves in fencing, field hockey, football, and handball are not counted as athletes:

Sport	Men	Women	Total
Archery	1	0	1
Athletics	14	22	36
Basketball	0	12	12
Boxing	3	0	3
Canoeing	0	4	4
Cycling	2	2	4
Diving	2	0	2
Fencing	1	0	1
Gymnastics	2	10	12
Judo	1	1	2
Modern pentathlon	0	1	1
Rowing	5	5	10
Sailing	1	1	2
Shooting	3	1	4
Swimming	4	2	6
Synchronized swimming	—	2	2
Table tennis	1	2	3
Taekwondo	1	0	1
Tennis	2	0	2
Weightlifting	5	3	8
Wrestling	6	2	8
Total	54	70	124

== Archery ==
One Belarusian archer has qualified for the men's individual recurve at the Olympics by virtue of a top five national finish at the 2016 Archery World Cup meet in Antalya, Turkey.

Athlete	Event	Ranking round		Round of 64	Round of 32	Round of 16	Quarterfinals	Semifinals	Final / BM	
Athlete	Event	Score	Seed	Opposition Score	Opposition Score	Opposition Score	Opposition Score	Opposition Score	Opposition Score	Rank
Anton Prylepau	Men's individual	643	52	Soto (CHI); L 5 (27)–5 (29)	Did not advance					

== Athletics ==
Belarusian athletes have so far achieved qualifying standards in the following athletics events (up to a maximum of 3 athletes in each event):

A total of 36 athletes (14 men and 22 women) were named to the Belarusian track and field roster, as part of the nation's official team announcement on 25 July 2016, including two-time Olympic medalist Ivan Tsikhan, 2015 Worlds middle-distance champion Maryna Arzamasava, hurdler Alina Talai, and javelin thrower Tatsiana Khaladovich.

Key

- Note–Ranks given for track events are within the athlete's heat only
- Q = Qualified for the next round
- q = Qualified for the next round as a fastest loser or, in field events, by position without achieving the qualifying target
- NR = National record
- N/A = Round not applicable for the event
- Bye = Athlete not required to compete in round

Track & road events
Men

Athlete	Event	Final	
Athlete	Event	Result	Rank
Aliaksandr Liakhovich	20 km walk	1:25:04	43
Uladzislau Pramau	Marathon	2:22:48	83
Stsiapan Rahautsou	Marathon	2:20:34	69
Dzianis Simanovich	20 km walk	DNF	
Ivan Trotski	50 km walk	DNF	

Women

Athlete	Event	Heat		Semifinal		Final	
Athlete	Event	Result	Rank	Result	Rank	Result	Rank
Maryna Arzamasava	800 m	1:58.44	2 Q	1:58.87	4 q	1:59.10	7
Katsiaryna Belanovich	400 m hurdles	56.55	6	Did not advance			
Maryna Damantsevich	Marathon	—N/a				2:37:34	45
Nastassia Ivanova	Marathon	—N/a				DNF	
Yuliya Karol	800 m	2:01.09	5	Did not advance			
Sviatlana Kudzelich	3000 m steeplechase	9:32.93	10	—N/a		Did not advance	
Volha Mazuronak	Marathon	—N/a				2:24:48	5
Katsiaryna Paplauskaya	100 m hurdles	13.45	7	Did not advance			
Nastassia Puzakova	3000 m steeplechase	10:14.08	17	—N/a		Did not advance	
Alina Talai	100 m hurdles	12.74	2 Q	13.66	8	Did not advance	
Nastassia Yatsevich	20 km walk	—N/a				1:32:53	17

Field events
Men

Athlete	Event	Qualification		Final	
Athlete	Event	Distance	Position	Distance	Position
Artsem Bandarenka	Triple jump	15.43	37	Did not advance	
Pavel Bareisha	Hammer throw	73.33	13	Did not advance	
Kanstantsin Barycheuski	Long jump	7.67	23	Did not advance	
Andrei Churyla	High jump	2.22	=30	Did not advance	
Siarhei Kalamoyets	Hammer throw	74.29	8 q	74.22	9
Dzmitry Nabokau	High jump	2.17	43	Did not advance	
Maksim Niastsiarenka	Triple jump	16.52	20	Did not advance	
Dzmitry Platnitski	Triple jump	16.52	19	Did not advance	
Ivan Tsikhan	Hammer throw	76.51	2 Q	77.79	2nd place, silver medalist(s)

Women

Athlete	Event	Qualification		Final	
Athlete	Event	Distance	Position	Distance	Position
Alena Abramchuk	Shot put	17.78	11 q	17.37	11
Aliona Dubitskaya	Shot put	17.76	12 q	18.23	8
Tatsiana Khaladovich	Javelin throw	63.78	5 Q	64.60	5
Tatsiana Korzh	Javelin throw	56.16	26	Did not advance	
Yuliya Leantsiuk	Shot put	17.66	17	Did not advance	
Hanna Malyshchyk	Hammer throw	71.12	8 q	71.90	7
Alena Sobaleva	Hammer throw	67.06	20	Did not advance	
Volha Sudarava	Long jump	6.29	26	Did not advance	
Iryna Vaskouskaya	Triple jump	13.35	31	Did not advance	
Natallia Viatkina	Triple jump	13.25	35	Did not advance	
Iryna Yakaltsevich	Pole vault	4.15	34	Did not advance	

== Basketball ==
=== Women's tournament ===
Belarus women's basketball team qualified for the Olympics by winning the fifth-place match over South Korea and securing the last of five remaining berths at the 2016 FIBA World Olympic Qualifying Tournament in Nantes, France, signifying the nation's return to the sport for the first time since 2008.

Team roster

The following is the Belarus roster for the women's basketball tournament of the 2016 Summer Olympics.

Belarus women's national basketball team – 2016 Summer Olympics roster
Players
Coaches

Pos.	No.	Name	Age – Date of birth	Height	Club	Ctr.
F	4	Maryia Papova	22 – 13 July 1994	1.89 m (6 ft 2 in)	Galatasaray	(Turkey)
PG	5	Aliaksandra Tarasava	28 – 23 June 1988	1.70 m (5 ft 7 in)	TSV 1880 Wasserburg	(Germany)
SF	6	Katsiaryna Snytsina	30 – 2 September 1985	1.88 m (6 ft 2 in)	Hatay BŞB	(Turkey)
SG	8	Tatsiana Likhtarovich	28 – 29 March 1988	1.80 m (5 ft 11 in)	Aluinvent DVTK	(Hungary)
PG	9	Volha Ziuzkova	33 – 14 June 1983	1.71 m (5 ft 7 in)	BK Tsmoki-Minsk	(Belarus)
C	10	Anastasiya Verameyenka	29 – 10 July 1987	1.92 m (6 ft 4 in)	Fenerbahçe	(Turkey)
C	11	Yelena Leuchanka	33 – 30 April 1983	1.95 m (6 ft 5 in)	Yakın Doğu	(Turkey)
G	12	Lindsey Harding	31 – 26 October 1984	1.73 m (5 ft 8 in)	New York Liberty	(United States)
F	13	Tatyana Troina	35 – 30 June 1981	1.88 m (6 ft 2 in)	Basket Gdynia	(Poland)
F	14	Nataliya Trafimava	37 – 16 June 1979	1.84 m (6 ft 0 in)	BK Gorizont Minsk	(Belarus)
PF	18	Maryia Filonchyk	24 – 10 January 1992	1.89 m (6 ft 2 in)	SBK Olimpia Grodno	(Belarus)
SG	41	Yuliya Rytsikava	29 – 8 September 1986	1.80 m (5 ft 11 in)	BK Gorizont Minsk	(Belarus)

Head coach

- (Belarus) Anatoli Buyalski

Assistant coach(es)

- (Belarus) Mikalai Buzliakou

Legend

- (C) Team captain
- Club – describes last
  club before the tournament
- Age – describes age
  on 6 August 2016

Group play

Pos	Team	Pld	W	L	PF	PA	PD	Pts	Qualification
1	Australia	5	5	0	400	345	+55	10	Quarter-finals
2	France	5	3	2	344	343	+1	8 (Note: Head-to-head record: France 3 pts, +8 PD; Turkey 3 pts, −2 PD; Japan 3 pts, −6 PD)	Quarter-finals
3	Turkey	5	3	2	324	325	−1	8	Quarter-finals
4	Japan	5	3	2	386	378	+8	8	Quarter-finals
5	Belarus	5	1	4	347	361	−14	6	
6	Brazil (H)	5	0	5	335	384	−49	5	

Source: FIBA
Rules for classification: 1) points; 2) head-to-head points; 3) head-to-head points difference; 4) head-to-head number of points scored.
(H) Hosts
Notes:

6 August 2016
19:45

Boxscore

Belarus	73–77	Japan
Scoring by quarter: 21–26, 19–15, 20–19, 13–17
Pts: Leuchanka 15; Rebs: Verameyenka 10; Asts: Harding 5		Pts: Kurihara 20; Rebs: Yoshida 9 Asts: Yoshida 8

Youth Arena, Rio de Janeiro
Attendance: 2,586
Referees: Damir Javor (SLO), Chahinaz Boussetta (MAR), Hwang In-tae (KOR)

7 August 2016
19:45

Boxscore

France	73–72	Belarus
Scoring by quarter: 14–22, 20–20, 18–11, 21–19
Pts: Epoupa 16; Rebs: Michel 8 Asts: Epoupa 5		Pts: Likhtarovich 16; Rebs: Leuchanka 13; Asts: Harding 8

Youth Arena, Rio de Janeiro
Attendance: 2,075
Referees: Ferdinand Pascual (PHI), Duan Zhu (CHN), Vaughan Mayberry (AUS)

9 August 2016
15:30

Boxscore

Brazil	63–65	Belarus
Scoring by quarter: 28–16, 12–19, 10–15, 13–15
Pts: Dantas 23; Rebs: Dos Santos 11; Asts: Pinto 4		Pts: Troina 18; Rebs: Leuchanka, Verameyenka 6 Asts: Harding 6

Youth Arena, Rio de Janeiro
Attendance: 2,075
Referees: Sreten Radović (CRO), Natalia Cuello (DOM), Leandro Lezcano (ARG)

11 August 2016
12:15

Boxscore

Belarus	71–74	Turkey
Scoring by quarter: 19–13, 14–20, 21–24, 17–17
Pts: Harding 17; Rebs: Leuchanka 10; Asts: Verameyenka 7		Pts: Yılmaz 26; Rebs: Sanders 11; Asts: Vardarlı 7

Youth Arena, Rio de Janeiro
Attendance: 1,784
Referees: Carlos Peruga (ESP), Hwang In-tae (KOR), Carlos Júlio (ANG)

13 August 2016
12:15

Boxscore

Australia	74–66	Belarus
Scoring by quarter: 22–25, 14–14, 16–20, 22–7
Pts: Cambage 17; Rebs: Cambage 9 Asts: Lavey 6		Pts: Harding 16; Rebs: Leuchanka 7 Asts: Likhtarovich, Leuchanka 4

Youth Arena, Rio de Janeiro
Attendance: 3,081
Referees: Karen Lasuik (CAN), Duan Zhu (CHN), Nadege Zouzou (CIV)

== Boxing ==
Belarus has entered three boxers to compete in the following weight classes into the Olympic boxing tournament. Bantamweight boxer Dzmitry Asanau became the first Belarusian to be selected to the Olympic team, following a top three finish and a box-off victory at the 2015 World Championships. Meanwhile, Pavel Kastramin and London 2012 Olympian Mikhail Dauhaliavets had claimed their Olympic spots at the 2016 AIBA World Qualifying Tournament in Baku, Azerbaijan.

Athlete	Event	Round of 32	Round of 16	Quarterfinals	Semifinals	Final	
Athlete	Event	Opposition Result	Opposition Result	Opposition Result	Opposition Result	Opposition Result	Rank
Dzmitry Asanau	Men's bantamweight	García (DOM); W 2–1	Erdenebat (MGL); L 1–2	Did not advance			
Pavel Kastramin	Men's welterweight	Adi (THA); L 1–2	Did not advance				
Mikhail Dauhaliavets	Men's light heavyweight	Manfredonia (ITA); W 2–1	Niyazymbetov (KAZ); L 0–3	Did not advance			

== Canoeing ==
=== Sprint ===
Belarusian canoeists have qualified one boat in each of the following events through the 2015 ICF Canoe Sprint World Championships. On 16 July 2016, the International Canoe Federation (ICF) imposed a one-year suspension on the entire Belarusian canoeing team for a widespread doping that would effectively banned them from the Olympics. Despite that the Belarusian canoeists managing to file their appeal to the Court of Arbitration for Sport (CAS), only the women were cleared to compete.

Athlete	Event	Heats		Semifinals		Final	
Athlete	Event	Time	Rank	Time	Rank	Time	Rank
Maryna Litvinchuk	Women's K-1 500 m	1:53.966	2 Q	1:55.641	1 FA	1:54.474	4
Nadzeya Liapeshka; Maryna Litvinchuk	Women's K-2 500 m	1:42.285	1 FA	Bye		1:46.967	6
Volha Khudzenka; Nadzeya Liapeshka; Maryna Litvinchuk; Marharyta Makhneva	Women's K-4 500 m	1:30.320	1 FA	Bye		1:36.908	3rd place, bronze medalist(s)

Qualification Legend: FA = Qualify to final (medal); FB = Qualify to final B (non-medal)

== Cycling ==
=== Road ===
Belarusian riders qualified for the following quota places in the men's and women's Olympic road race by virtue of their top 15 final national ranking in the 2015 UCI Europe Tour (for men) and top 22 in the 2016 UCI World Ranking (for women).

Athlete	Event	Time	Rank
Vasil Kiryienka	Men's road race	Did not finish	
Vasil Kiryienka	Men's time trial	1:16:05.70	17
Kanstantsin Sivtsov	Men's road race	6:30:05	49
Kanstantsin Sivtsov	Men's time trial	1:18:58.75	25
Alena Amialiusik	Women's road race	3:53:37	13
Alena Amialiusik	Women's time trial	46:05.73	11

=== Track ===
Following the completion of the 2016 UCI Track Cycling World Championships, Belarus has entered one rider to compete in women's omnium at the Olympics, by virtue of her final individual UCI Olympic ranking in that event.

Omnium

Athlete	Event	Scratch race		Individual pursuit			Elimination race		Time trial			Flying lap			Points race		Total points	Rank
Athlete	Event	Rank	Points	Time	Rank	Points	Rank	Points	Time	Rank	Points	Time	Rank	Points	Points	Rank	Total points	Rank
Tatsiana Sharakova	Women's omnium	1	40	3:37.204	10	22	7	28	37.007	17	8	14.564	13	16	50	4	164	9

== Diving ==
Belarusian divers qualified for the following individual and synchronized team spots at the 2016 Summer Olympics through the World Championships and FINA World Cup series.

Athlete	Event	Preliminaries		Semifinals		Final	
Athlete	Event	Points	Rank	Points	Rank	Points	Rank
Vadim Kaptur	Men's 10 m platform	353.85	24	Did not advance			
Yauheni Karaliou	Men's 10 m platform	347.80	26	Did not advance			

== Fencing ==
Belarus has entered one fencer into the Olympic competition. London 2012 Olympian Aliaksandr Buikevich had claimed his Olympic spot in the men's sabre by finishing among the top 14 individual fencers in the FIE Adjusted Official Rankings.

Athlete	Event	Round of 32	Round of 16	Quarterfinal	Semifinal	Final / BM	
Athlete	Event	Opposition Score	Opposition Score	Opposition Score	Opposition Score	Opposition Score	Rank
Aliaksandr Buikevich	Men's sabre	Polossifakis (CAN); W 15–6	Szilágyi (HUN); L 12–15	Did not advance			

== Gymnastics ==
=== Artistic ===
Belarus has entered two artistic gymnasts into the Olympic competition. Andrey Likhovitskiy and American-born Kylie Dickson had claimed their Olympic spots each in the men's and women's apparatus and all-around events, respectively, at the Olympic Test Event in Rio de Janeiro.

Men

Athlete	Event	Qualification								Final							
Athlete	Event	Apparatus						Total	Rank	Apparatus						Total	Rank
Athlete	Event	F	PH	R	V	PB	HB	Total	Rank	F	PH	R	V	PB	HB	Total	Rank
Andrey Likhovitskiy	All-around	14.200	15.233	13.866	13.966	14.900	14.600	86.765	16 Q	14.300	15.033	13.933	14.033	14.966	14.366	86.631	18

Women

Athlete	Event	Qualification						Final					
Athlete	Event	Apparatus				Total	Rank	Apparatus				Total	Rank
Athlete	Event	V	UB	BB	F	Total	Rank	V	UB	BB	F	Total	Rank
Kylie Dickson	All-around	13.866	12.833	10.333	10.766	47.798	58	Did not advance					

=== Rhythmic ===
Belarus has qualified a squad of rhythmic gymnasts for the individual and group all-around by finishing in the top 15 (for individual) and top 10 (for group) at the 2015 World Championships in Stuttgart, Germany. The rhythmic gymnastics squad was named as part of the nation's official team announcement on 25 July 2016.

Athlete	Event	Qualification						Final					
Athlete	Event	Hoop	Ball	Clubs	Ribbon	Total	Rank	Hoop	Ball	Clubs	Ribbon	Total	Rank
Katsiaryna Halkina	Individual	17.733	17.733	17.200	17.466	70.132	9 Q	17.966	17.966	17.650	17.350	70.932	6
Melitina Staniouta	Individual	18.400	17.650	18.350	18.175	72.575	4 Q	18.200	18.250	16.633	18.050	71.133	5

Athlete	Event	Qualification				Final			
Athlete	Event	5 ribbons	3 clubs 2 hoops	Total	Rank	5 ribbons	3 clubs 2 hoops	Total	Rank
Hanna Dudzenkova; Maria Kadobina; Maryia Katsiak; Valeriya Pischelina; Arina Tsitsilina	Team	17.583	17.850	35.433	3 Q	17.283	18.016	35.299	5

=== Trampoline ===
Belarus has qualified a total of three gymnasts (one male and two females) in both men's and women's trampoline by virtue of a top eight finish at the 2015 World Championships in Odense, Denmark.

Athlete	Event	Qualification		Final	
Athlete	Event	Score	Rank	Score	Rank
Uladzislau Hancharou	Men's	111.090	2 Q	61.745	1st place, gold medalist(s)
Hanna Harchonak	Women's	100.275	6 Q	5.700	8
Tatsiana Piatrenia	Women's	104.515	1 Q	54.650	5

== Judo ==
Belarus has qualified two judokas for each of the following weight classes at the Games. Dzmitry Shershan was ranked among the top 22 eligible judokas for men in the IJF World Ranking List of 30 May 2016, while Darya Skrypnik at women's half-lightweight (52 kg) earned a continental quota spot from the European region as the highest-ranked Belarusian judoka outside of direct qualifying position.

Athlete	Event	Round of 64	Round of 32	Round of 16	Quarterfinals	Semifinals	Repechage	Final / BM	
Athlete	Event	Opposition Result	Opposition Result	Opposition Result	Opposition Result	Opposition Result	Opposition Result	Opposition Result	Rank
Dzmitry Shershan	Men's −66 kg	Bye	Sobirov (UZB); L 000–001	Did not advance					
Darya Skrypnik	Women's −52 kg	—N/a	Kräh (GER); L 001–011	Did not advance					

== Modern pentathlon ==
Belarus has entered one modern pentathlete into the women's event at the Games. Going to her third straight Olympics, Anastasiya Prokopenko was ranked among the top 10 modern pentathletes, not yet qualified, based on the UIPM World Rankings as of 1 June 2016.

Athlete	Event	Fencing (épée one touch)				Swimming (200 m freestyle)			Riding (show jumping)			Combined: shooting/running (10 m air pistol)/(3200 m)			Total points	Final rank
Athlete	Event	RR	BR	Rank	MP points	Time	Rank	MP points	Penalties	Rank	MP points	Time	Rank	MP Points	Total points	Final rank
Anastasiya Prokopenko	Women's	10–25	2	34	162	2:25.69	35	263	11	15	289	12:12.98	4	558	1272	22

== Rowing ==
Belarus has qualified five boats for each of the following rowing classes into the Olympic regatta. Four rowing crews had confirmed Olympic places for their boats each in the men's single sculls, men's four, women's pair, and women's double sculls at the 2015 FISA World Championships in Lac d'Aiguebelette, France, while a women's single sculls rower had added one more boat to the Belarusian roster as a result of her top three finish at the 2016 European & Final Qualification Regatta in Lucerne, Switzerland.

Men

Athlete	Event	Heats		Repechage		Quarterfinals		Semifinals		Final	
Athlete	Event	Time	Rank	Time	Rank	Time	Rank	Time	Rank	Time	Rank
Stanislau Shcharbachenia	Single sculls	7:11.49	2 QF	Bye		6:55.19	3 SA/B	7:06.69	2 FA	6:48.78	5
Vadzim Lialin; Dzianis Mihal; Ihar Pashevich; Mikalai Sharlap	Four	6:02.93	4 R	6:36.50	2 SA/B	—N/a		6:22.46	4 FB	6:00.57	9

Women

Athlete	Event	Heats		Repechage		Quarterfinals		Semifinals		Final	
Athlete	Event	Time	Rank	Time	Rank	Time	Rank	Time	Rank	Time	Rank
Ekaterina Karsten	Single sculls	8:21.21	2 QF	Bye		7:28.03	3 SA/B	7:48.89	5 FB	7:25.03	8
Alena Furman; Inna Nikulina	Pair	7:35.23	5 R	8:07.16	6 FC	—N/a		Bye		8:32.54	15
Yuliya Bichyk; Tatsiana Kukhta	Double sculls	7:27.22	3 SA/B	Bye		—N/a		6:57.64	5 FB	7:40.48	8

Qualification Legend: FA=Final A (medal); FB=Final B (non-medal); FC=Final C (non-medal); FD=Final D (non-medal); FE=Final E (non-medal); FF=Final F (non-medal); SA/B=Semifinals A/B; SC/D=Semifinals C/D; SE/F=Semifinals E/F; QF=Quarterfinals; R=Repechage

== Sailing ==
Belarusian sailors have qualified one boat in each of the following classes through the 2014 ISAF Sailing World Championships, the individual fleet Worlds, and European qualifying regattas. Meanwhile, the men's RS:X spot had been re-allocated to the Belarusian team as the next highest-ranked eligible NOC, after New Zealand decided to reject the berth won by JP Tobin at the 2014 World Championships.

Athlete	Event	Race													Net points	Final rank
Athlete	Event	1	2	3	4	5	6	7	8	9	10	11	12	M*	Net points	Final rank
Mikita Tsirkun	Men's RS:X	23	27	25	16	8	~~32~~	16	19	22	24	18	17	EL	215	22
Tatiana Drozdovskaya	Women's Laser Radial	22	10	5	13	25	17	26	~~30~~	13	6	—N/a		EL	137	19

M = Medal race; EL = Eliminated – did not advance into the medal race

== Shooting ==
Belarusian shooters have achieved quota places for the following events by virtue of their best finishes at the 2014 and 2015 ISSF World Championships, the 2015 ISSF World Cup series, and European Championships or Games, as long as their minimum qualifying scored (MQS) were fulfilled by 31 March 2016.

Rifle shooters Vitali Bubnovich, Illia Charheika, and Yury Shcherbatsevich, as well as pistol ace and four-time Olympian Viktoria Chaika, were officially named to the Olympic roster on 13 July 2016. Having missed a chance to defend his Olympic title in men's 50 m rifle prone, Sergei Martynov offered a special role at the Games as the head coach of the Belarusian rifle shooting team.

Athlete	Event	Qualification		Semifinal		Final	
Athlete	Event	Points	Rank	Points	Rank	Points	Rank
Vitali Bubnovich	Men's 10 m air rifle	622.9	17	—N/a		Did not advance	
Vitali Bubnovich	Men's 50 m rifle prone	626.2	4 Q	—N/a		144.2	5
Illia Charheika	Men's 10 m air rifle	625.5	8 Q	—N/a		121.6	6
Illia Charheika	Men's 50 m rifle 3 positions	1166	31	—N/a		Did not advance	
Yury Shcherbatsevich	Men's 50 m rifle prone	622.1	18	—N/a		Did not advance	
Yury Shcherbatsevich	Men's 50 m rifle 3 positions	1170	18	—N/a		Did not advance	
Viktoria Chaika	Women's 10 m air pistol	380	16	—N/a		Did not advance	
Viktoria Chaika	Women's 25 m pistol	575	24	Did not advance			

Qualification Legend: Q = Qualify for the next round; q = Qualify for the bronze medal (shotgun)

== Swimming ==
Belarusian swimmers have so far achieved qualifying standards in the following events (up to a maximum of 2 swimmers in each event at the Olympic Qualifying Time (OQT), and potentially 1 at the Olympic Selection Time (OST)): To secure their nomination to the Olympic team, swimmers must attain a top two finish under the FINA Olympic qualifying A standard in each of the individual pool events at the Belarusian Open (20 to 23 April) in Brest.

Six swimmers (four men and two women) were selected to the Belarusian team for the Games, with double silver medalist Aliaksandra Herasimenia and butterfly stalwart Pavel Sankovich leading them and racing in the pool at their third straight Olympics.

Athlete	Event	Heat		Semifinal		Final	
Athlete	Event	Time	Rank	Time	Rank	Time	Rank
Pavel Sankovich	Men's 100 m butterfly	53.00	28	Did not advance			
Viktar Staselovich	Men's 100 m backstroke	55.68	32	Did not advance			
Yauhen Tsurkin	Men's 100 m freestyle	49.37	35	Did not advance			
Yauhen Tsurkin	Men's 100 m butterfly	53.24	=30	Did not advance			
Mikita Tsmyh	Men's 100 m backstroke	54.97	29	Did not advance			
Mikita Tsmyh	Men's 200 m backstroke	2:00.96	25	Did not advance			
Aliaksandra Herasimenia	Women's 50 m freestyle	24.42	3 Q	24.53	8 Q	24.11 NR	3rd place, bronze medalist(s)
Aliaksandra Herasimenia	Women's 100 m freestyle	54.25	13 Q	54.34	13	Did not advance	
Yuliya Khitraya	Women's 50 m freestyle	25.18	27	Did not advance			

== Synchronized swimming ==
Belarus has fielded a squad of two synchronized swimmers to compete only in the women's duet by picking up one of four spare berths freed by the continental selection for being the next highest ranking nation at the FINA Olympic test event in Rio de Janeiro, signifying their nation's Olympic comeback to the sport since 2008.

Athlete	Event	Technical routine		Free routine (preliminary)			Free routine (final)		
Athlete	Event	Points	Rank	Points	Total (technical + free)	Rank	Points	Total (technical + free)	Rank
Iryna Limanouskaya; Veronika Yesipovich	Duet	78.9913	21	79.0000	157.9913	21	Did not advance		

== Table tennis ==
Belarus has entered three athletes into the table tennis competition at the Games. Olympic veterans Vladimir Samsonov and Viktoria Pavlovich were automatically selected among the top 22 eligible players each in their respective singles events based on the ITTF Olympic Rankings. Meanwhile, London 2012 Olympian Aleksandra Privalova was granted an invitation from ITTF to compete in the women's singles as one of the next seven highest-ranked eligible players, not yet qualified, on the Olympic Ranking List.

Athlete	Event	Preliminary	Round 1	Round 2	Round 3	Round of 16	Quarterfinals	Semifinals	Final / BM	
Athlete	Event	Opposition Result	Opposition Result	Opposition Result	Opposition Result	Opposition Result	Opposition Result	Opposition Result	Opposition Result	Rank
Vladimir Samsonov	Men's singles	Bye			Karlsson (SWE); W 4–2	Drinkhall (GBR); W 4–2	Ovtcharov (GER); W 4–2	Zhang Jk (CHN); L 1–4	Mizutani (JPN); L 1–4	4
Viktoria Pavlovich	Women's singles	Bye	Edem (NGR); W 4–1	Mikhailova (RUS); W 4–2	Cheng I-c (TPE); L 3–4	Did not advance				
Aleksandra Privalova	Women's singles	Bye	Shahsavari (IRI); W 4–3	Chen S-y (TPE); L 2–4	Did not advance					

== Taekwondo ==
Belarus entered one athlete into the taekwondo competition for the first time at the Olympics. Arman-Marshall Silla secured a place in the men's heavyweight category (+80 kg) by virtue of his top two finish at the 2016 European Qualification Tournament in Istanbul, Turkey.

Athlete	Event	Round of 16	Quarterfinals	Semifinals	Repechage	Final / BM	
Athlete	Event	Opposition Result	Opposition Result	Opposition Result	Opposition Result	Opposition Result	Rank
Arman-Marshall Silla	Men's +80 kg	Cha D-m (KOR); L DSQ	Did not advance				

== Tennis ==
Belarus has entered two tennis players into the Olympic tournament. Two-time Australian Open champion and double Olympic medalist Victoria Azarenka (world no. 39) qualified directly as one of the top 56 eligible players in the WTA World Rankings as of 6 June 2016. Reigning mixed doubles champion and four-time Olympian Max Mirnyi teamed up with his London 2012 partner Aliaksandr Bury to compete for the second time in the men's doubles.

On 15 July 2016, Azarenka announced her withdrawal from the Games due to expected pregnancy with her first child, leaving only Bury and Mirnyi on the tennis team.

Athlete	Event	Round of 32	Round of 16	Quarterfinals	Semifinals	Final / BM	
Athlete	Event	Opposition Score	Opposition Score	Opposition Score	Opposition Score	Opposition Score	Rank
Aliaksandr Bury; Max Mirnyi	Men's doubles	Marach / Peya (AUT); L 6–7^{(4–7)}, 5–7	Did not advance				

== Weightlifting ==
Belarusian weightlifters have qualified a maximum of six men's and four women's quota places for the Rio Olympics based on their combined team standing by points at the 2014 and 2015 IWF World Championships. The team must allocate these places to individual athletes by 20 June 2016.

On 22 June 2016, the International Weightlifting Federation had decided to strip of one Olympic men's and women's entry place each from Belarus because of "multiple positive cases" of doping throughout the qualifying period.

Men

Athlete	Event	Snatch		Clean & Jerk		Total	Rank
Athlete	Event	Result	Rank	Result	Rank	Total	Rank
Petr Asayonak	−85 kg	170	=6	207	6	377	6
Pavel Khadasevich	−85 kg	170	=6	195	=9	365	7
Aliaksandr Bersanau	−94 kg	173	=7	208	8	381	8
Vadzim Straltsou	−94 kg	175	4	220	2	395	2nd place, silver medalist(s)
Aliksei Mzhachyk	+105 kg	187	=9	224	12	411	12

Women

Athlete	Event	Snatch		Clean & Jerk		Total	Rank
Athlete	Event	Result	Rank	Result	Rank	Total	Rank
Anastasiya Mikhalenka	−69 kg	~~103~~	DNF	—	—	—	DNF
Darya Pachabut	−69 kg	105	8	132	7	237	7
Darya Naumava	−75 kg	116	2	142	2	258	2nd place, silver medalist(s)

== Wrestling ==
Belarus has qualified a total of eight wrestlers for each the following weight classes into the Olympic competition. Two of them finished among the top six to book Olympic spots each in the men's Greco-Roman 59 kg and women's freestyle 75 kg at the 2015 World Championships, while three more berths were awarded to the Belarusian wrestlers, who progressed to the top two finals at the 2016 European Qualification Tournament.

Two further wrestlers had claimed the remaining Olympic slots each in men's Greco-Roman 85 & 98 kg to round out the Belarusian roster at the initial meet of the World Qualification Tournament in Ulaanbaatar.

On 28 July 2016, United World Wrestling awarded an additional Olympic license to Belarus in men's freestyle 57 kg, as the next highest-ranked nation, not yet qualified, at the World Championships one year earlier, and as a response to the previous doping bans on Russian qualified wrestlers, and to the implications in the McClaren Report on Russian state-sponsored doping allegations.

Key:

- VT – Victory by Fall.
- PP – Decision by Points – the loser with technical points.
- PO – Decision by Points – the loser without technical points.
- ST – Technical superiority – the loser without technical points and a margin of victory of at least 8 (Greco-Roman) or 10 (freestyle) points.
- SP – Technical superiority – the loser with technical points and a margin of victory of at least 8 (Greco-Roman) or 10 (freestyle) points.

Men's freestyle

Athlete	Event	Qualification	Round of 16	Quarterfinal	Semifinal	Repechage 1	Repechage 2	Final / BM	
Athlete	Event	Opposition Result	Opposition Result	Opposition Result	Opposition Result	Opposition Result	Opposition Result	Opposition Result	Rank
Asadulla Lachinau	−57 kg	Ansari (MAR); W 4–1 ^{SP}	Higuchi (JPN); L 0–4 ^{ST}	Did not advance		Yang K-i (PRK); L 1–3 ^{PP}	Did not advance		7
Amarhajy Mahamedau	−86 kg	Kakhidze (KAZ); W 3–1 ^{PP}	Cox (USA); L 1–3 ^{PP}	Did not advance					9
Ibrahim Saidau	−125 kg	Bye	Shabanbay (KAZ); W 3–0 ^{PO}	Akgül (TUR); L 0–4 ^{ST}	Did not advance	Bye	Jargalsaikhan (MGL); W 3–1 ^{PP}	Berianidze (ARM); W 3–1 ^{PP}	3rd place, bronze medalist(s)

Men's Greco-Roman

Athlete	Event	Qualification	Round of 16	Quarterfinal	Semifinal	Repechage 1	Repechage 2	Final / BM	
Athlete	Event	Opposition Result	Opposition Result	Opposition Result	Opposition Result	Opposition Result	Opposition Result	Opposition Result	Rank
Soslan Daurov	−59 kg	Bye	Berge (NOR); L 0–3 ^{PO}	Did not advance					15
Javid Hamzatau	−85 kg	Bye	Peng F (CHN); W 3–0 ^{PO}	Hrustanović (AUT); W 4–0 ^{ST}	Beleniuk (UKR); L 0–3 ^{PO}	Bye		Bayryakov (BUL); W 3–1 ^{PP}	3rd place, bronze medalist(s)
Tsimafei Dzeinichenka	−98 kg	Schön (SWE); L 1–3 ^{PP}	Did not advance						14

Women's freestyle

Athlete	Event	Qualification	Round of 16	Quarterfinal	Semifinal	Repechage 1	Repechage 2	Final / BM	
Athlete	Event	Opposition Result	Opposition Result	Opposition Result	Opposition Result	Opposition Result	Opposition Result	Opposition Result	Rank
Maryia Mamashuk	−63 kg	Bye	Larionova (KAZ); W 3–1 ^{PP}	Johansson (SWE); W 3–1 ^{PP}	Pirozhkova (USA); W 3–1 ^{PP}	Bye		Kawai (JPN); L 0–3 ^{PO}	2nd place, silver medalist(s)
Vasilisa Marzaliuk	−75 kg	Bye	Vescan (FRA); W 5–0 ^{VT}	Gray (USA); W 3–1 ^{PP}	Wiebe (CAN); L 0–3 ^{PO}	Bye		Zhang Fl (CHN); L 1–3 ^{PP}	5

== See also ==
- Belarus at the 2016 Summer Paralympics
