= 2017 Magyar Kupa (women's basketball) =

Basketball tournament season

2017 Killik László Magyar Kupa
Tournament details
- Arena: Lauber Dezső Sports Hall; Pécs, Hungary
- Dates: 31 March – 2 April 2017

Final positions
- Champions: UNIQA Sopron (7th title)
- Runners-up: VBW CEKK Cegléd
- Third place: CMB Cargo UNI Győr
- Fourth place: PEAC-Pécs

Awards and statistics
- MVP: (United States) Shenise Johnson

The 2017 Tippmix László Killik Női Magyar Kupa was the 51st season of the Hungarian Basketball Cup.

== Bracket ==
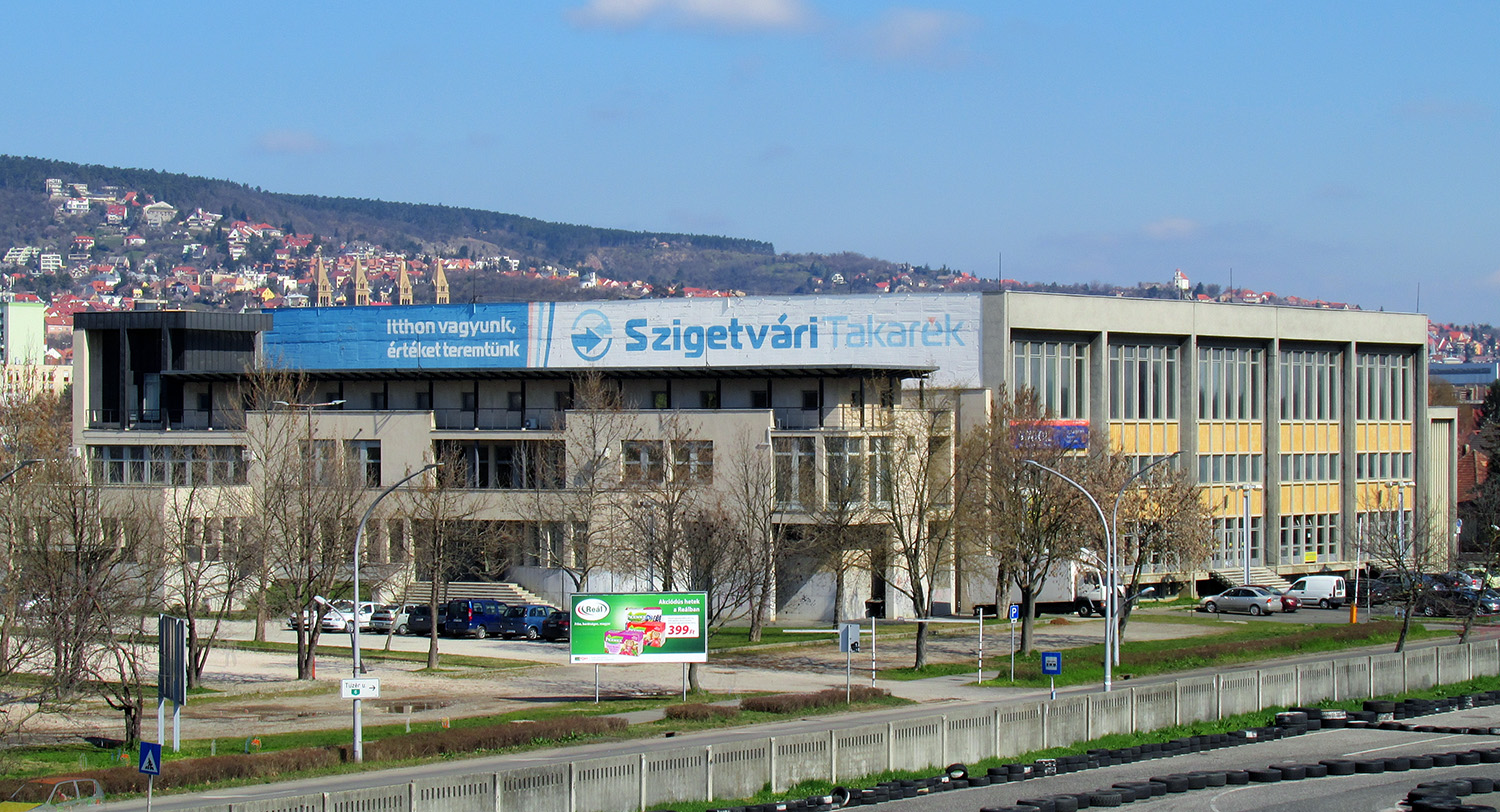
Lauber Dezső Sportcsarnok hosted the tournament

Quarterfinals; March 31
Uniqa Sopron	77
ZTE NKK	61
Atomerőmű KSC Szekszárd	53
CMB Cargo UNI Győr	67
PEAC-Pécs	94
Vasas Akadémia	46
VBW CEKK Cegléd	68
Aluinvent DVTK Miskolc	66

Semifinals; April 1
Uniqa Sopron	78
CMB Cargo UNI Győr	59
PEAC-Pécs	77
VBW CEKK Cegléd	79

Final; April 2
Uniqa Sopron	94
VBW CEKK Cegléd	64

== Matches ==
=== Bronze medal match ===
2 April 2017 Bronze match	PEAC-Pécs	66–71	CMB Cargo UNI Győr	Pécs
16:00 (CEST)	Scoring by quarter: 15–22, 18–11, 20–15, 13–23
	Pts: Kuster 23; Rebs: Šikšniūtė 8 Asts: Fűrész, Mandić 3 PIR: Kuster 35	Boxscore	Pts: Kiesel 24; Rebs: Goree 7 Asts: Likhtarovich 6 PIR: Kiesel 35	Arena: Lauber Dezső Sports Hall; Attendance: 800; Referees: Z. Pálla, Gy. Balogh, J. Vida, (Z. Farkas)

=== Final ===
2 April 2017 Final	VBW CEKK Cegléd	64–94	UNIQA Sopron	Pécs
18:30 (CEST)	Scoring by quarter: 25–27, 15–17, 10–28, 14–22
	Pts: Škorić 22; Rebs: Škorić 8 Asts: Medgyessy 6 PIR: Škorić 25	Boxscore	Pts: Johnson 31; Rebs: Crvendakić 8 Asts: Turner 8 PIR: Johnson 40	Arena: Lauber Dezső Sports Hall; Attendance: 1,200; Referees: T. Földházi, Cs. Cziffra, D. Tőzsér, (J. Gincsai)

== See also ==
- 2016–17 Nemzeti Bajnokság I/A
