= Belarus women's national basketball team =

Belarus
- FIBA ranking: NR (14 September 2026)
- FIBA zone: FIBA Europe (suspended)
- National federation: Belarusian Basketball Federation
- Coach: Nataliya Trafimava

Olympic Games
- Appearances: 2
- Medals: None

World Cup
- Appearances: 2
- Medals: None

EuroBasket
- Appearances: 8
- Medals: Bronze (2007)
Home	Away

The Belarus women's national basketball team (Belarusian: Жаночая зборная Беларусі па баскетболе, romanized: Zhanochaya zbornaya Byelarusi pa basketbolye)represented Belarus in international women's basketball tournaments. The team is controlled by the Belarusian Basketball Federation.

After the 2022 Russian invasion of Ukraine, the FIBA suspended Belarus from participating in basketball and 3x3 basketball competitions.

== Competitive record ==
Belarus was part of the Soviet Union until 1991.

=== Olympic Games ===
Olympic Games
Year	Position	Pld	W	L
(Australia) 2000	Did not qualify			
(Greece) 2004	Did not qualify			
(China) 2008	6th	6	2	4
(United Kingdom) 2012	Did not qualify			
(Brazil) 2016	9th	5	1	4
(Japan) 2020	Did not qualify			
(France) 2024	Banned			
(United States) 2028	To be determined			

=== FIBA World Cup ===
FIBA Women's Basketball World Cup
Year	Position	Pld	W	L
(Australia) 1994	Did not qualify			
(Germany) 1998	Did not qualify			
(China) 2002	Did not qualify			
(Brazil) 2006	Did not qualify			
(Czech Republic) 2010	4th	9	4	5
(Turkey) 2014	10th	4	2	2
(Spain) 2018	Did not qualify			
(Australia) 2022	Withdrew			
(Germany) 2026	Banned			
(Japan) 2030	To be determined			

=== EuroBasket ===
EuroBasket					Qualification		
Year	Position	Pld	W	L	Pld	W	L
(Czech Republic) 1995	Did not qualify				3	1	2
(Hungary) 1997	Did not qualify				7	5	2
(Poland) 1999	Did not qualify						
(France) 2001	Did not qualify						
(Greece) 2003	Did not qualify						
(Turkey) 2005	Did not qualify						
(Italy) 2007	3rd	9	5	4			
(Latvia) 2009	4th	9	4	5			
(Poland) 2011	9th	6	3	3			
(France) 2013	5th	9	5	4	8	6	2
(Hungary) / (Romania) 2015	4th	10	5	5			
(Czech Republic) 2017	15th	3	0	3	4	2	2
(Latvia) / (Serbia) 2019	13th	3	1	2			
(France) / (Spain) 2021	4th	6	3	3	4	3	1
(Israel) / (Slovenia) 2023	Excluded				Excluded		
(Czech Republic) / (Germany) / (Italy) / (Greece) 2025	Excluded				Excluded		
(Belgium) / (Finland) / (Sweden) / (Lithuania) 2027	To be determined				To be determined		
Total		55	26	29	26	17	9

== Current roster ==
Roster for EuroBasket Women 2021.

Belarus women's national basketball team roster
Players
Coaches

Pos.	No.	Name	Age – Date of birth	Height	Club	Ctr.
SG	4	Alena Karasevich	27 – 4 April 1994	1.79 m (5 ft 10 in)	Olimpia Grodno	(Belarus)
PG	5	Aliaksandra Tarasava	32 – 23 June 1988	1.72 m (5 ft 8 in)	TK Hannover	(Germany)
SF	7	Yuliya Rytsikava	34 – 8 September 1986	1.80 m (5 ft 11 in)	Horizont Minsk	(Belarus)
SG	8	Tatsiana Likhtarovich	33 – 29 March 1988	1.80 m (5 ft 11 in)	Basket Esch	(Luxembourg)
PG	9	Volha Ziuzkova	38 – 14 June 1983	1.71 m (5 ft 7 in)	Horizont Minsk	(Belarus)
PF	10	Anastasiya Verameyenka	33 – 10 July 1987	1.92 m (6 ft 4 in)	Horizont Minsk	(Belarus)
PF	13	Maryia Papova	26 – 13 July 1994	1.88 m (6 ft 2 in)	UMMC Ekaterinburg	(Russia)
G	17	Yuliya Vasilevich	19 – 21 June 2001	1.72 m (5 ft 8 in)	Olimpia Grodno	(Belarus)
PF	18	Hanna Brych	24 – 8 March 1997	1.86 m (6 ft 1 in)	Kazanochka Kazan	(Russia)
PG	20	Alex Bentley	30 – 27 October 1990	1.73 m (5 ft 8 in)	Dynamo Kursk	(Russia)
C	21	Viktoryia Hasper	33 – 9 January 1988	1.92 m (6 ft 4 in)	Horizont Minsk	(Belarus)
SF	23	Yanina Inkina	23 – 16 October 1997	1.86 m (6 ft 1 in)	Horizont Minsk	(Belarus)

Head coach

- (Belarus) Nataliya Trafimava

Assistant coach(es)

- (Belarus) Aliaksei Pyntsikau
- (Bosnia and Herzegovina) Zlatan Prešić

Legend

- Club – describes last
  club before the tournament
- Age – describes age
  on 17 June 2021

== 3x3 team ==
Natallia Dashkevich and Maryna Ivashchanka both stand 1.90m (6 ft 3in) and hence have a size advantage against most opponents. Belarus finished with bronze at the 2019 European Games on home soil.
