= 2024–25 Belarusian Women's Premier League (basketball) =

Women's basketball league in Belarus

Belarusian Women's Premier League
- Season: 2024–25
- Dates: Regular season: 21 September – 30 October 2024; Winners and losers stage: 15 November – 13 April 2025; Play Offs: 16 April – 19 May 2025

Regular season
- Season MVP: (United States) Keira Robinson

Finals
- Champions: Horizont Minsk (7th title)
- Runners-up: ŽBK Minsk
- Finals MVP: (Belarus) Anastasiya Verameyenka

Statistical leaders
| Points | (Belarus) Ilona Katsyro | 18.2 |
| Rebounds | (Belarus) Olga Trigribtseva | 9.7 |
| Assists | (Belarus) Ilona Katsyro | 5.6 |
| Steals | (Belarus) Anastasia Chupakhina | 3.7 |
| Blocks | (Belarus) Anastasiya Verameyenka (Belarus) Alena Tsitavets | 1.2 |

The 2024–25 Belarusian Women's Premier League is the 33rd season of the top division women's basketball league in Belarus since its establishment in 1992. It starts in September 2024 with the first round of the regular season and ended in May 2025.

ŽBK Minsk are the defending champions.

Horizont Minsk won their Seventh title after beating ŽBK Minsk in the final.

== Format ==
In the first round, each team plays each other once. The top five progress to the winners stage while the bottom four advance to the losers stage. In the winners stage, teams play each other six times and the top two make the semifinals while the clubs finishing third, fourth and fifth reach the quarterfinals. In the losers stage, teams play each other six times and only the sixth place team advances to the quarterfinals. The quarterfinals are played as a best of three series while the semifinals and final is played as a best of five series.

== Regular season ==
| Pos | Team | Pld | W | L | PF | PA | PD | Pts | Qualification |
|---|---|---|---|---|---|---|---|---|---|
| 1 | ŽBK Minsk | 8 | 8 | 0 | 765 | 365 | +400 | 16 | Winners stage |
| 2 | Horizont Minsk | 8 | 7 | 1 | 744 | 370 | +374 | 15 | Winners stage |
| 3 | Olimpia Grodno | 8 | 6 | 2 | 691 | 404 | +287 | 14 | Winners stage |
| 4 | ŽBK Minsk Youth | 8 | 5 | 3 | 608 | 443 | +165 | 13 | Winners stage |
| 5 | Horizont Minsk 2 | 8 | 4 | 4 | 496 | 582 | −86 | 12 | Winners stage |
| 6 | Gomel | 8 | 3 | 5 | 557 | 574 | −17 | 11 | Losers stage |
| 7 | Victoria Brest | 8 | 2 | 6 | 379 | 686 | −307 | 10 | Losers stage |
| 8 | Victoria Grodno | 8 | 1 | 7 | 401 | 702 | −301 | 9 | Losers stage |
| 9 | Gomel 2 | 8 | 0 | 8 | 257 | 772 | −515 | 8 | Losers stage |

Source: Belarusian Women's Basketball League
Rules for classification: 1) Points; 2) Points difference; 3) Points scored.

=== Winners stage ===
| Pos | Team | Pld | W | L | PF | PA | PD | Pts | Qualification |
|---|---|---|---|---|---|---|---|---|---|
| 1 | Horizont Minsk | 32 | 29 | 3 | 2602 | 1596 | +1006 | 61 | Semifinals |
| 2 | Olimpia Grodno | 32 | 23 | 9 | 2334 | 1724 | +610 | 55 | Semifinals |
| 3 | ŽBK Minsk | 32 | 22 | 10 | 2437 | 1699 | +738 | 54 | Quarterfinals |
| 4 | Horizont Minsk 2 | 32 | 8 | 24 | 1638 | 2358 | −720 | 40 (Note: Horizont Minsk 2 3–2 ŽBK Minsk Youth) | Quarterfinals |
| 5 | ŽBK Minsk Youth | 32 | 8 | 24 | 1765 | 2259 | −494 | 40 | Quarterfinals |

Source: Belarusian Women's Basketball League
Rules for classification: 1) Points; 2) Points difference; 3) Points scored.

=== Losers stage ===
| Pos | Team | Pld | W | L | PF | PA | PD | Pts | Qualification |
|---|---|---|---|---|---|---|---|---|---|
| 6 | Gomel | 26 | 16 | 10 | 2059 | 1650 | +409 | 42 | Quarterfinals |
| 7 | Victoria Brest | 26 | 13 | 13 | 1585 | 1756 | −171 | 39 | |
| 8 | Victoria Grodno | 26 | 12 | 14 | 1646 | 1813 | −167 | 38 | |
| 9 | Gomel 2 | 26 | 1 | 25 | 1045 | 2256 | −1211 | 27 | Relegation |

Source: Belarusian Women's Basketball League
Rules for classification: 1) Points; 2) Points difference; 3) Points scored.

== Play offs ==
Quarterfinals
3 | ŽBK Minsk | 90 | 96 | 2
6 | Gomel | 52 | 60 | 0
4 | Horizont Minsk 2 | 43 | 63 | 2
5 | ŽBK Minsk Youth | 39 | 60 | 0

Semifinals
1 | Horizont Minsk | 89 | 95 | 96 | 3
4 | Horizont Minsk 2 | 32 | 48 | 67 | 0
2 | Olimpia Grodno | 47 | 47 | 61 | 61 | 66 | 2
3 | ŽBK Minsk | 68 | 61 | 56 | 59 | 70 | 3

Final
1 | Horizont Minsk | 64 | 72 | 68 | 53 | 52 | 3
3 | ŽBK Minsk | 65 | 57 | 65 | 55 | 45 | 2
Third place
4 | Horizont Minsk 2 | 45 | 62 | 0
2 | Olimpia Grodno | 78 | 86 | 2

Champions of Belarus

Horizont Minsk
Seventh title
