= 2012–13 EuroCup Women =

- League: EuroCup Women
- Sport: Basketball

Regular season

Final
- Champions: (Russia) Dynamo Moscow
- Runners-up: (Turkey) Kayseri Kaski SK

EuroCup Women seasons
- ← 2011–12 2013–14 →

The EuroCup Women 2012–13 was the eleventh edition of FIBA Europe's second-tier international competition for women's basketball clubs under such name. It was contested by 30 teams from 15 countries from 24 October 2012 to 14 March 2013.

== Group stage ==
#	Team	Pld	W	L	PF	PA
1	(France) Lattes	6	5	1	485	362
2	(Russia) Chevakata Vologda	6	5	1	470	379
3	(Romania) Satu Mare	6	2	4	363	461
4	(Denmark) SISU Copenhague	6	0	6	341	487

	LAT	CHE	SAT	SIS
Lattes		87–76	84–41	79–44
Chevakata	69–67		74–38	88–63
S. Mare	67–77	74–77		86–73
SISU	65–91	50–86	46–57	

#	Team	Pld	W	L	PF	PA
1	(France) Hainaut	6	5	1	480	368
2	(Belarus) Olimpia Grodno	6	3	3	416	395
3	(Turkey) Ankara Kolejliler	6	3	3	395	421
4	(Belgium) Young Cats	6	1	5	402	509

	HAI	OLI	ANK	YOU
Hainaut		65–60	82–66	86–42
Olimpia	70–65		69–54	74–75
Ankara	51–82	63–55		81–64
Y. Cats	79–100	73–88	69–80	

#	Team	Pld	W	L	PF	PA
1	(France) Tarbes	6	5	1	446	365
2	(Turkey) Mersin	6	5	1	407	384
3	(Russia) Spartak Noginsk	6	2	4	328	350
4	(Belgium) Namur-Capitale	6	0	6	367	449

	TAR	MER	SPA	NAM
Tarbes		71–77	71–42	82–72
Mersin	68–80		62–53	80–68
Spartak	47–65	46–50		63–43
Namur	59–77	66–70	59–77	

#	Team	Pld	W	L	PF	PA
1	(Russia) Dynamo Novosibirsk	6	5	1	407	323
2	(France) Nantes Rezé	6	5	1	470	375
3	(Germany) Wasserburg	6	2	4	418	426
4	(Belgium) Sint-Katelijne-Waver	6	0	6	355	526

	DYN	NAN	WAS	KAT
Dynamo		61–53	55–54	91–57
Nantes	63–58		83–66	110–63
Wasserburg	55–72	68–81		87–58
St-Katelijne	41–70	59–80	77–88	

#	Team	Pld	W	L	PF	PA
1	(Turkey) Kayseri	4	3	1	304	245
2	(Belarus) Horizont Minsk	4	2	2	267	278
3	(Sweden) Södertälje	4	1	3	247	295

	KAI	HOR	SÖD
Kayseri		70–55	81–51
Horizont	78–73		65–64
Södertälje	61–80	71–69	

#	Team	Pld	W	L	PF	PA
1	(Russia) Dynamo Kursk	4	4	0	344	262
2	(Turkey) Botaş	4	2	2	294	315
3	(Bulgaria) Dunav Ruse	4	0	4	286	347

	DYN	BOT	DUN
Dynamo		79–64	80–66
Botaş	62–86		84–80
Dunav	70–99	70–84	

#	Team	Pld	W	L	PF	PA
1	(Russia) Dynamo Moscow	6	4	2	451	388
2	(Czech Republic) VS Prague	6	3	3	405	438
3	(Serbia) Partizan Belgrade	6	3	3	436	439
4	(France) Landes	6	2	4	400	427

	DYN	PRA	PAR	LAN
Dynamo		83–40	70–65	66–51
Prague	73–86		75–81	68–58
Partizan	80–73	61–78		77–57
Landes	79–73	69–71	86–72	

#	Team	Pld	W	L	PF	PA
1	(Turkey) Antakya	4	2	2	294	275
2	(Slovakia) Ružomberok	4	2	2	263	256
3	(Lithuania) Kibirkšties	4	2	2	257	283
4	(Israel) Elitzur Ramla	Walkover				

	ANT	RUZ	KIB	ELI
Antakya		65–77	66–70	69–63
Ružomberok	62–70		54–59	Not P.
Kibirkšties	66–93	62–70		Not P.
Elitzur	Not P.	77–70	Not P.	

== Round of 16 ==
Team #1	Agg.	Team #2	1st	2nd
Kayseri (Turkey)	154–142	(Turkey) Mersin	91–87	63–55
VS Prague (Czech Republic)	114–147	(Russia) Dynamo Kursk	63–66	51–81
Ružomberok (Slovakia)	126–120	(Russia) Dynamo Novosibirsk	57–60	69–60
Olimpia Grodno (Belarus)	121–144	(France) Nantes Rezé	59–77	62–67
Dynamo Moscow (Russia)	142–135	(France) Tarbes	54–55	88–80
Botaş (Turkey)	128–138	(France) Lattes	62–69	66–69
Antakya (Turkey)	125–134	(Russia) Chevakata Vologda	79–61	46–73
Horizont Minsk (Belarus)	110–122	(France) Hainaut	58–60	52–62

== Quarterfinals ==
Team #1	Agg.	Team #2	1st	2nd
Kayseri (Turkey)	165–163	(Russia) Dynamo Kursk	101–86	64–77
Ružomberok (Slovakia)	130–113	(France) Nantes Rezé	51–56	79–57
Dynamo Moscow (Russia)	159–135	(France) Lattes	73–51	86–84
Chevakata Vologda (Russia)	145–96	(France) Hainaut	79–51	66–45

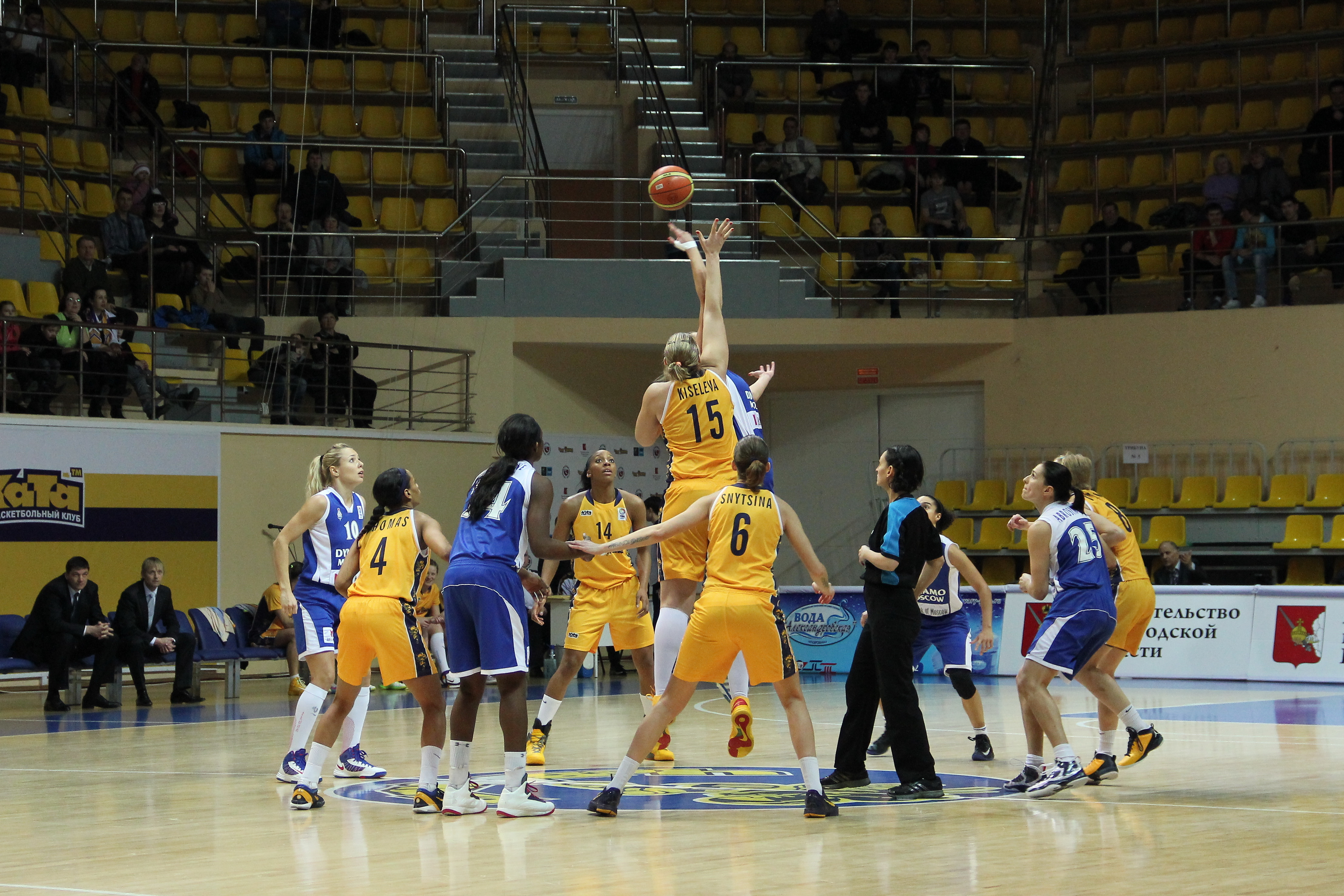
Second semifinal game «Chevakata Vologda» — «Dynamo Moscow»

== Semifinals ==
Team #1	Agg.	Team #2	1st	2nd
Dynamo Moscow (Russia)	150–135	(Russia) Chevakata Vologda	82–73	68–62
Ružomberok (Slovakia)	125–152	(Turkey) Kayseri	60–79	65–73

== Final ==
Team #1	Agg.	Team #2	1st	2nd
Dynamo Moscow (Russia)	136–135	(Turkey) Kayseri	66–61	70–74
