= Diósgyőri VTK (basketball) =

DVTK
- Leagues: NB I/A
- Founded: 1946, 2011
- Arena: DVTK Arena
- Location: Miskolc, Hungary
- Team colors: Red and white
- President: Tamás Szabó
- Head coach: Péter Völgyi
- Championships: 1 Hungarian Championship, 5 Hungarian Cups
- Website: http://kosarlabda.dvtk.hu/
Home	Away

Diósgyőri VTK is a Hungarian women's basketball club playing in the Hungarian Championship. It was founded after World War II. In 1991, it separated from the Diósgyőri VTK football club and began to play as Diósgyőri KSK. It won the National Cup in 1993 and 1994 and it was a regular in the Ronchetti Cup through the 1990s. It has subsequently made four appearances in the Eurocup. In 2006, the club dissolved but was re-founded in 2011. In 2013, the club re-joined the DVTK. The club made history by reaching first time the Euroleague in 2022 and the next year they were very close to Final Four. And the most awaited moment has come in 2024 when DVTK won the Hungarian Championship first time in the club history.

== Titles ==
- Hungarian Championship
  - Champion (1): 2023/2024
  - Runner-up (6): 1991/1992, 1993/1994, 1995/1996, 2014/2015, 2018/2019, 2024/2025
  - Bronze medal (4): 1958/1959, 1992/1993, 1994/1995, 2004/2005
- Hungarian Cup
  - Winner (5): 1992/1993, 1993/1994, 2015/2016, 2021/2022, 2024/2025
  - Runner-up (5): 1996/1997, 2004/2005, 2014/2015, 2020/2021, 2023/2024

== Current roster ==
DVTK HUN-Therm roster
Players
Coaches

Pos.	No.	Nat.	Name	Ht.	Wt.	Age
PG	0	(Hungary)	Aho, Tyra	1.68 m (5 ft 6 in)		20 – 5 September 2005
PG	5	(United States)	Charles, Kaila	1.84 m (6 ft 0 in)		27 – 23 March 1998
PG	7	(Hungary)	Kányási, Veronika	1.78 m (5 ft 10 in)		26 – 27 May 1999
PG	10	(Hungary)	Aho, Nina	1.75 m (5 ft 9 in)		28 – 24 June 1997
SG	13	(Hungary)	Lelik, Réka	1.79 m (5 ft 10 in)		26 – 14 April 1999
PF	14	(Australia)	Garbin, Darcee	1.88 m (6 ft 2 in)		31 – 24 June 1994
C	15	(France)	Tadić, Ana	1.98 m (6 ft 6 in)		27 – 21 September 1998
PF	16	(Hungary)	Farbás, Eliza	1.91 m (6 ft 3 in)		19 – 5 May 2006
PF	18	(Lithuania)	Grigalauskytė, Monika	1.91 m (6 ft 3 in)		33 – 17 February 1992
PG	25	(Hungary)	Tenyér, Zsófia	1.77 m (5 ft 10 in)		26 – 27 April 1999
C	27	(Hungary)	Vég-Dudás, Anna	1.92 m (6 ft 4 in)		24 – 8 January 2002
F	35	(Montenegro)	Jovanović, Milica	1.89 m (6 ft 2 in)		36 – 14 August 1989
SF	42	(Hungary)	Toman, Petra	1.88 m (6 ft 2 in)		20 – 13 February 2005
PG	47	(Hungary)	Oláh, Fruzsina	1.75 m (5 ft 9 in)		21 – 2 March 2004

Head coach

- (Hungary) Péter Völgyi

Assistant coach(es)

- (Hungary) Márta Ábrahám

Legend

- (C) Team captain
- Injured

- Roster
Updated: 2024-05-09

== 2022–2023 roster ==
DVTK HUN-Therm roster
Players
Coaches

Pos.	No.	Nat.	Name	Ht.	Wt.	Age
PG	0	(Hungary)	Aho, Tyra	1.68 m (5 ft 6 in)		20 – 5 September 2005
F	5	(United Kingdom)	Green, Cheridene	1.90 m (6 ft 3 in)		30 – 19 September 1995
PG	7	(Hungary)	Kányási, Veronika	1.78 m (5 ft 10 in)		26 – 27 May 1999
PG	10	(Hungary)	Aho, Nina	1.75 m (5 ft 9 in)		28 – 24 June 1997
PF	14	(Australia)	Garbin, Darcee	1.88 m (6 ft 2 in)		31 – 24 June 1994
PF	18	(Lithuania)	Grigalauskytė, Monika	1.91 m (6 ft 3 in)		33 – 17 February 1992
SG	23	(Hungary)	Bacsó, Zsófia	1.70 m (5 ft 7 in)		23 – 11 October 2002
SG	24	(Puerto Rico)	Guirantes, Arella	1.80 m (5 ft 11 in)		28 – 15 October 1997
C	27	(Hungary)	Vég-Dudás, Anna	1.92 m (6 ft 4 in)		24 – 8 January 2002
C	30	(Hungary)	Kiss, Angelika	1.90 m (6 ft 3 in)		24 – 12 March 2001
F	35	(Montenegro)	Jovanović, Milica	1.89 m (6 ft 2 in)		36 – 14 August 1989
SF	43	(Hungary)	Márkusz, Lilla	1.80 m (5 ft 11 in)		21 – 1 June 2004
PG	47	(Hungary)	Oláh, Fruzsina	1.75 m (5 ft 9 in)		21 – 2 March 2004
PG	92	(Hungary)	Bernáth, Réka	1.73 m (5 ft 8 in)		26 – 24 July 1999

Head coach

- (Hungary) Péter Völgyi

Assistant coach(es)

- (Hungary) Márta Ábrahám

Legend

- (C) Team captain
- Injured

- Roster
Updated: 2023-01-12

== 2021–2022 roster ==
Head coach: (Hungary) Attila Földi until 22. November 2021. (Hungary) Péter Völgyi from 22. November 2021.

The 2021–2022 roster is shown below.

- #5 (1.91) (United Kingdom) Sheridene Green
- #7 (1.79) (Hungary) Veronika Kányási
- #8 (1.80) (Serbia) Snežana Bogičević
- #10 (1.75) (Hungary) Nina Aho
- #11 (1.75) (Hungary) Dóra Medgyessy
- #20 (1.85) (United States) Keyona Hayes
- #23 (1.71) (Hungary) Zsófia Bacsó
- #24 (1.87) (Hungary) Franka Tóth
- #27 (1.93) (Hungary) Anna Vég-Dudás
- #30 (1.92) (Hungary) Angelika Kiss
- #35 (1.87) (Montenegro) Milica Jovanović
- #43 (???) (Hungary) Márkusz Lilla
- #47 (???) (Hungary) Oláh Fruzsina
- #92 (1.77) (Hungary) Bernáth Réka

== 2020–2021 roster ==
Head coach: (Hungary) Attila Földi

The 2020–2021 roster is shown below.

- #1 (1.85) (Hungary) Szonja Vukov
- #3 (1.80) (Hungary) Petra Pusztai
- #7 (1.79) (Hungary) Veronika Kányási
- #10 (1.75) (Hungary) Nina Aho
- #11 (1.75) (Hungary) Dóra Medgyessy
- #20 (1.89) (United States) Keyona Hayes
- #23 (1.71) (Hungary) Zsófia Bacsó
- #24 (1.87) (Hungary) Franka Tóth
- #27 (1.93) (Hungary) Anna Vég-Dudás
- #30 (1.92) (Hungary) Angelika Kiss
- #45 (1.95) (Democratic Republic of the Congo) Chanel Mokango
- #99 (1.73) (Hungary) Nikolett Frindt

Left the team during the season

- #28 (1.93) (Latvia) Kristine Vitola

== 2019–2020 roster ==
Head coach: (Hungary) László Cziczás

The 2019–2020 roster is shown below.

- #3 (1.80) (Hungary) Petra Pusztai
- #5 (1.164) (Hungary) Karina Kecskés
- #7 (1.79) (Hungary) Veronika Kányási
- #8 (1.71) (Hungary) Réka Szűcs
- #11 (1.75) (Hungary) Dóra Medgyessy
- #12 (1.80) (Hungary) Szidónia Katona
- #15 (1.85) (Hungary) Dorina Zele
- #17 (1.94) (Chile) Ziomara Morrison
- #21 (1.72) (Hungary) Nóra Szegeczki
- #18 (1.88) (Hungary) (United States) Cyesha Goree
- #23 (1.71) (Hungary) Zsófia Bacsó
- #24 (1.87) (Serbia) Maja Škorić
- #27 (1.93) (Hungary) Anna Vég-Dudás
- #30 (1.92) (Hungary) Angelika Kiss
- #32 (1.80) (United States) Shatori Walker-Kimbrough
- #33 (1.74) (Hungary) Bianka Kababik
- #45 (1.95) (Democratic Republic of the Congo) Chanel Mokango
- #99 (1.73) (Hungary) Nikolett Frindt

== 2018–2019 roster ==
Head coach: (Hungary) László Cziczás

The 2018–2019 roster is shown below.

- #5 (1.78) (Hungary) Fanni Szabó
- #7 (1.79) (Hungary) Veronika Kányási
- #8 (1.71) (Hungary) Réka Szűcs
- #10 (1.74) (Hungary) Nóra Eperjesi
- #11 (1.75) (Hungary) Dóra Medgyessy
- #12 (1.80) (Hungary) Szidónia Katona
- #14 (1.91) (Lithuania) Eglė Šulčiūtė
- #15 (1.85) (Hungary) Dorina Zele
- #22 (1.91) (Latvia) Aija Putniņa
- #24 (1.87) (Serbia) Maja Škorić
- #30 (1.88) (Hungary) Angelika Kiss
- #32 (1.80) (United States) Shatori Walker-Kimbrough
- #33 (1.74) (Hungary) Bianka Kababik
- #45 (1.95) (Democratic Republic of the Congo) Chanel Mokango
- #99 (1.73) (Hungary) Nikolett Frindt

== 2017–2018 roster ==
Head coach: (Slovakia) Štefan Svitek; (Hungary) Erzsébet Ambrus

The 2017–2018 roster is shown below.

- #1 (1.77) (Hungary) Gréta Schmidt
- #3 (1.78) (Hungary) Boglárka Bach
- #5 (1.78) (Hungary) Fanni Szabó
- #6 (1.80) (Hungary) Krisztina Raksányi
- #8 (1.70) (Hungary) Dóra Nagy
- #14 (1.90) (Czech Republic) Tereza Peckova
- #15 (1.85) (Hungary) Dorina Zele
- #21 (1.91) (Hungary) Aldazabal Laura
- #22 (1.94) (Lithuania) Zenta Melnika
- #25 (1.85) (Hungary) Szonja Vukov
- #30 (1.88) (Hungary) Angelika Kiss
- #32 (1.91) (United States) Alyssia Brewer
- #33 (1.77) (United States) Asleigh Fontenette

Left the team during the season

- #11 (1.82) (United States) Kirby Burkholder 08/03/2017

== 2016–2017 roster ==
Head coach: (Spain) Maikel López

The 2016–2017 roster is shown below.

- #2 (1.93) (Australia) (United Kingdom) Louella Tomlinson
- #4 (1.78) (United States) Tierra Ruffin-Pratt
- #6 (1.89) (Hungary) Dorottya Győri
- #7 (1.79) (Hungary) Jázmin Vörösházi
- #8 (1.70) (Hungary) Bernadett Horváth
- #10 (1.82) (Hungary) Lilla Adamecz
- #11 (1.77) (Hungary) Tímea Czank
- #12 (1.78) (Hungary) Boglárka Bach
- #14 (1.92) (Serbia) Tina Jovanović
- #15 (1.82) (Hungary) Ágnes Gorjanácz
- #17 (1.81) (Hungary) Zsófia Arad
- #18 (1.78) (Hungary) Dorina Kalocsai
- #21 (1.91) (Hungary) Rita Rasheed
- #23 (1.89) (Hungary) Orsolya Szécsi
- #41 (1.82) (Hungary) Emőke Sikora

Left the team during the season

- #1 (1.70) (United States) Samantha Prahalis
- #13 (1.93) (United States) Cierra Robertson-Warren
- #42 (1.91) (United States) Kaylon Williams

== 2015–2016 roster ==
Head coach: (Spain) Maikel López

The 2015–2016 roster is shown below.

- #5 (1.95) (Hungary) Dóra Horti
- #6 (1.80) (Belarus) Tatsiana Likhtarovich
- #8 (1.70) (Hungary) Bernadett Horváth
- #10 (1.84) (Hungary) Petra Szabó
- #11 (1.77) (Hungary) Tímea Czank
- #12 (1.78) (Hungary) Boglárka Bach
- #13 (1.82) (Hungary) Réka Bálint
- #14 (1.92) (Serbia) Tina Jovanović
- #15 (1.80) (United States) Roneeka Hodges
- #18 (1.78) (Hungary) Dorina Kalocsai
- #21 (1.82) (Hungary) Rasheed Rita
- #23 (1.89) (Hungary) Orsolya Szécsi
- #32 (1.90) (United States) Alyssia Brewer
- #41 (1.82) (Hungary) Emőke Sikora
- #44 (1.92) (Hungary) Daniella Bartucz
- #51 (1.81) (Hungary) Zsófia Arad

Left the team during the season

- #3 (1.77) (United States) D'shara Strange
- #4 (1.75) (United States) Tayler Hill

== 2014–2015 roster ==
Head coach: (Spain) Maikel López

The 2014–2015 roster is shown below.

- #1 (1.87) (United States) Rachel Allison
- #4 (1.85) (Hungary) Debóra Dubei
- #5 (1.80) (Belgium) Romina Ciappina
- #8 (1.70) (Hungary) Bernadett Horváth
- #10 (1.84) (Hungary) Petra Szabó
- #11 (1.77) (Hungary) Tímea Czank
- #12 (1.81) (Hungary) Zsófia Arad
- #13 (1.82) (Hungary) Réka Bálint
- #14 (1.82) (Hungary) Emőke Sikora
- #15 (1.91) (Mali) (France) Naignouma Coulibaly
- #21 (1.82) (Hungary) Rasheed Rita
- #23 (1.89) (Hungary) Orsolya Szécsi
- #55 (1.89) (Australia) Abby Bishop

Left the team during the season

- (United States) Italee Lucas after pre-season
- (Belarus) Katsiaryna Snytsina 1/1/2015
- (United States) Tiffany Bias 1/1/2015

== 2013–2014 roster ==
Head coach: (Hungary) Ákos Peresztegi Nagy; (Spain) Maikel López

The 2013–2014 roster is shown below.

- #4 (1.84) (Iceland) Helena Sverrisdóttir
- #5 (1.82) (United States) Brittainy Raven
- #6 (1.83) (Hungary) Brigitta Szabó
- #8 (1.70) (Hungary) Bernadett Horváth
- #9 (1.72) (Hungary) Mónika Bukovszki
- #10 (1.84) (Hungary) Petra Szabó
- #11 (1.76) (Hungary) Tímea Czank
- #12 (1.89) (Hungary) Viktória Vincze
- #13 (1.82) (Hungary) Réka Bálint
- #32 (1.95) (United States) Rebecca Tobin
- #44 (1.81) (Hungary) Debóra Dubei
- #45 (1.90) (Latvia) Liene Jansone

== 2012–2013 roster ==
Head coach: (Hungary) Ákos Peresztegi Nagy

- (1.92) (Hungary) Fruzsina Fejes
- (1.90) (Hungary) Bettina Bozóki
- (1.90) (United States) Lenita Sanford
- (1.84) (Serbia) Maja Škorić
- (1.83) (United States) Brittainey Raven
- (1.83) (Hungary) Dóra Reiner
- (1.83) (Hungary) Petra Szabó
- (1.82) (Hungary) Brigitta Szabó
- (1.80) (Hungary) Debóra Dubei
- (1.80) (Hungary) Emőke Sikora
- (1.75) (Serbia) Brankica Hadžović
- (1.74) (Hungary) Kata Fürtös
- (1.71) (Hungary) Mónika Bukovszki
- (1.88) (Hungary) Zsófia Arad
- (1.73) (Hungary) Tamara Hájer
- (1.75) (Hungary) Barbara Ocsenás
