= 2017 Magyar Kupa =

2017 Magyar Kupa may refer to the following competitions in Hungary:

- 2017 Magyar Kupa (men's basketball)
- 2017 Magyar Kupa (women's basketball)
- 2017 Magyar Kupa (men's water polo)
- 2017 Magyar Kupa (women's water polo)
- 2017 Magyar Kupa Final, a men's football match
