= Völgyi =

Völgyi is a Hungarian surname. Notable people with the surname include:

- Dániel Völgyi (born 1987), Hungarian footballer
- Péter Völgyi, Hungarian sprint canoeist
