= 2011–12 EuroCup Women =

- League: EuroCup Women
- Sport: Basketball

Regular season

Final
- Champions: (Russia) Dynamo Kursk
- Runners-up: (Turkey) Kayseri Kaski SK

EuroCup Women seasons
- ← 2010–11 2012–13 →

The EuroCup Women 2011–12 was the tenth edition of FIBA Europe's second-tier international competition for women's basketball clubs under such name. It ran from 2 November 2011 to 22 March 2012.

Dynamo Kursk won the competition beating Kayseri Kaski SK in the final by overcoming a 14-points first leg loss. It was the fourth time the EuroCup went to Russia, following Baltiyskaya Zvezda, Spartak Moscow Region and Dynamo Moscow's wins between 2004 and 2007.

== Group stage ==
=== Group A ===
#	Team	Pld	W	L	PF	PA
1	(Turkey) Botaş	6	6	0	503	364
2	(Belarus) Horizont Minsk	6	2	4	440	459
3	(Russia) Dynamo Moscow	6	2	4	430	461
4	(Portugal) Quinta dos Lombos	6	2	4	396	485

=== Group B ===
#	Team	Pld	W	L	PF	PA
1	(Turkey) Beşiktaş	6	5	1	421	386
2	(Belgium) Young Cats	6	3	3	423	436
3	(Russia) Dynamo Novosibirsk	6	2	4	400	405
4	(Sweden) Södertälje	6	2	4	417	434

=== Group C ===
#	Team	Pld	W	L	PF	PA
1	(Turkey) Kolejliler	6	5	1	440	410
2	(Belgium) Namur	6	4	2	429	425
3	(France) Rezé	6	3	3	442	397
4	(Portugal) Vagos	6	0	6	343	422

=== Group D ===
#	Team	Pld	W	L	PF	PA
1	(France) Hainaut	6	5	1	438	374
2	(Spain) Islas Canarias	6	4	2	390	383
3	(Austria) Flying Foxes	6	3	3	383	376
4	(Lithuania) Klaipeda	6	0	6	390	468

=== Group E ===
#	Team	Pld	W	L	PF	PA
1	(Russia) Chevakata	6	5	1	482	336
2	(France) Arras	6	4	2	463	334
3	(Denmark) SISU	6	1	5	346	371
4	(Belgium) St. Katelijne	6	1	5	307	457

=== Group F ===
#	Team	Pld	W	L	PF	PA
1	(Russia) Dynamo Kursk	6	6	0	508	386
2	(Turkey) Kayseri Kaski	6	3	3	436	454
3	(Belarus) Olimpia Grodno	6	2	4	399	477
4	(Israel) Maccabi Bnot Ashdod	6	1	5	401	453

=== Group G ===
#	Team	Pld	W	L	PF	PA
1	(Slovakia) Ružomberok	6	4	2	485	435
2	(France) Landes	6	3	3	418	421
3	(Switzerland) Hélios	6	3	3	433	457
4	(Serbia) Partizan Belgrade	6	2	4	435	458

=== Group H ===
#	Team	Pld	W	L	PF	PA
1	(Israel) Elitzur Ramla	4	4	0	305	224
2	(France) Mondeville	4	2	2	231	245
3	(Russia) Spartak Noginsk	4	0	4	212	279

== Round of 16 ==
Team #1	Agg.	Team #2	1st	2nd
Kayseri Kaski (Turkey)	143–139	(Israel) Elitzur Ramla	79–69	64–70
Namur (Belgium)	122–146	(France) Hainaut	63–69	59–77
Islas Canarias (Spain)	147–121	(Turkey) Beşiktaş	69–60	78–61
Mondeville (France)	136–140	(Turkey) Botaş	69–58	67–82
Landes (France)	98–125	(France) Arras	50–73	45–55
Young Cats (Belgium)	108–163	(Russia) Chevakata	55–82	53–81
Ružomberok (Slovakia)	147–132	(Turkey) Kolejliler	71–65	76–67
Horizont Minsk (Belarus)	108–160	(Russia) Dynamo Kursk	55–82	53–78

== Quarter-finals ==
Team #1	Agg.	Team #2	1st	2nd
Kayseri Kaski (Turkey)	127–118	(France) Hainaut	68–59	59–59
Islas Canarias (Spain)	119–129	(Turkey) Botaş	64–67	55–62
Arras (France)	127–151	(Russia) Chevakata	71–80	56–71
Ružomberok (Slovakia)	149–155	(Russia) Dynamo Kursk	80–81	69–74

== Semifinals ==
Team #1	Agg.	Team #2	1st	2nd
Kayseri Kaski (Turkey)	143–136	(Turkey) Botaş	77–65	66–71
Chevakata (Russia)	113–130	(Russia) Dynamo Kursk	62–71	51–59

== Final ==
Team #1	Agg.	Team #2	1st	2nd
Kayseri Kaski (Turkey)	121–130	(Russia) Dynamo Kursk	69–55	52–75
