= Maikel López =

Spanish basketball coach

Personal information
- Born: 17 April 1972 (age 54) Canary Islands, Spain
- Position: Head coach
- Coaching career: 2002–present

Career history

Coaching
- 2002–2003: CB Islas Canarias (assistant)
- 2003–2008: CB Islas Canarias
- 2009–2011: Torpan Pojat
- 2011–2013: CB Islas Canarias
- 2013–2017: Diósgyőri VTK
- 2017–2018: CB Islas Canarias
- 2018–2019: CSM Satu Mare
- 2019–2020: Shanxi Loongs (assistant)
- 2020–2022: CSM Satu Mare
- 2023–2025: Adelitas de Chihuahua
- 2024: Dorados de Chihuahua
- 2025: Dorados de Chihuahua

Miguel de Jesus López Alonzo (born 17 April 1972) is a Spanish basketball coach. He is the head coach of the Dorados de Chihuahua.

== Coaching career ==
López started his coaching career in Spain with CB Islas Canarias. In 2009, he signed with Torpan Pojat in Finland. In 2013 he joined Diósgyőri VTK. In 2018 he joined CSM Satu Mare. In 2019 he joined the staff of Shanxi Loongs.

On 2023, López signed with the Adelitas de Chihuahua and a season later he joined Dorados de Chihuahua.
