= Antonia Delaere =

Belgian basketball player

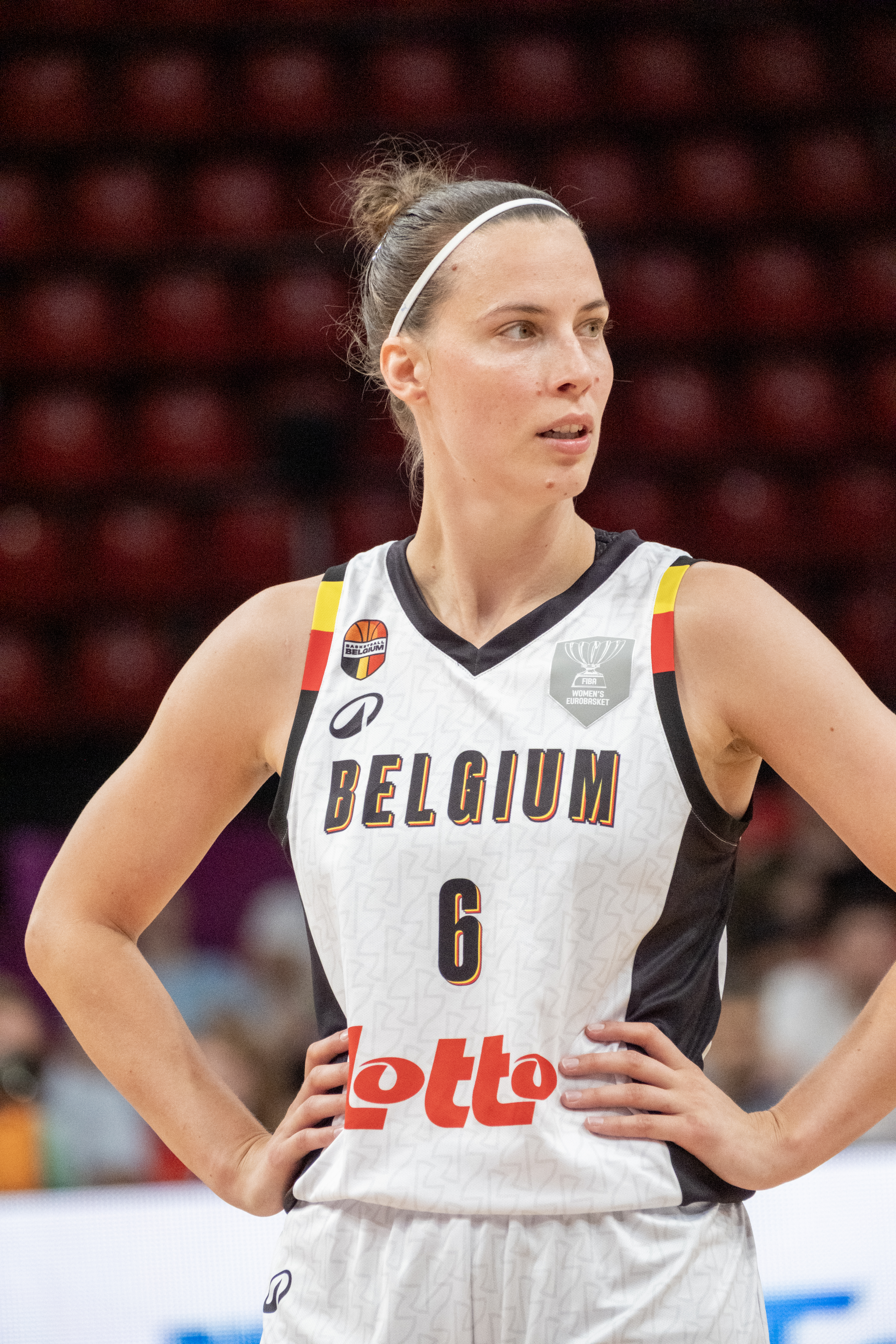
- Delaere with Belgium during the 2025 EuroBasket

No. 8 – Minnesota Lynx
- Position: Guard
- League: WNBA

Personal information
- Born: 1 August 1994 (age 32) Antwerp, Belgium
- Listed height: 5 ft 11 in (1.80 m)
- Listed weight: 155 lb (70 kg)

Career information
- WNBA draft: 2016: undrafted

Career history
- 2010–2015: BBC Kangoeroes Boom
- 2015–2016: BC Namur-Capitale
- 2016–2019: BC Castors Braine
- 2019–2020: Nantes Rezé Basket
- 2021–2022: Basket Zaragoza
- 2022–2023: Reyer Venezia
- 2023–2024: CB Avenida
- 2026–present: Minnesota Lynx

Career highlights
- Belgian League champion (2017, 2018, 2019); FIBA EuroBasket champion (2023, 2025)
- Stats at WNBA.com
- Stats at Basketball Reference

Antonia Delaere (born 1 August 1994) is a Belgian basketball player for the Minnesota Lynx in the WNBA. She plays internationally for the Belgian national team.

She participated at the EuroBasket Women 2017, the EuroBasket Women 2021 where Belgium won the bronze medal. She was also part of the Belgian squad that became European champion in 2023 and 2025. In that latter tournament, she became the unlikely match winner for Belgium in both the semi-final against Italy and the final against Spain making clutch match winning baskets allowing Belgium to overtake the lead in both games with reps. 17 and 5 seconds left on the clock.

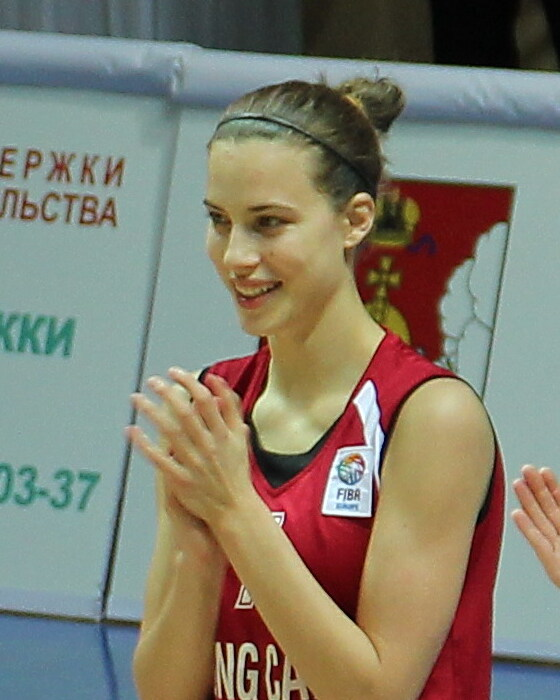
Delaere with the Lotto Young Cats in 2012

== Honours ==
=== Club ===
(Belgium) BC Namur-Capitale

- Belgian Cup: 2016

(Belgium) Castors Braine

- Belgian Championship: 2016–17, 2017–18, 2018–19
- Belgian Cup: 2017, 2019

=== National team ===
- FIBA World Cup: (4th place) 2018
- EuroBasket Women: (gold) 2023, 2025 (bronze) 2017, 2021
- Belgian Sports team of the Year: 2020, 2023, 2025

== Career statistics ==
Legend
GP	Games played	GS	Games started	MPG	Minutes per game	RPG	Rebounds per game
APG	Assists per game	SPG	Steals per game	BPG	Blocks per game	PPG	Points per game
TO	Turnovers per game	FG%	Field-goal percentage	3P%	3-point field-goal percentage	FT%	Free-throw percentage
**Bold**	Career best	°	League leader

=== WNBA ===
==== Regular season ====
WNBA regular season statistics
Year	Team	GP	GS	MPG	FG%	3P%	FT%	RPG	APG	SPG	BPG	TO	PPG
2026	Minnesota	39	0	11.7	.452	.413	1.000	.8	1.1	.4	.0	.5	3.0
**Career**	1 year, 1 team	39	0	11.7	.452	.413	1.000	.8	1.1	.4	.0	.5	3.0

==== Playoffs ====
WNBA playoff statistics
Year	Team	GP	GS	MPG	FG%	3P%	FT%	RPG	APG	SPG	BPG	TO	PPG
2026	Minnesota	1	0	2.0	—	—	—	.0	.0	.0	.0	.0	.0
**Career**	1 year, 1 team	1	0	2.0	—	—	—	.0	.0	.0	.0	.0	.0
