= Bernadett Horváth =

Hungarian handball player (born 1990)

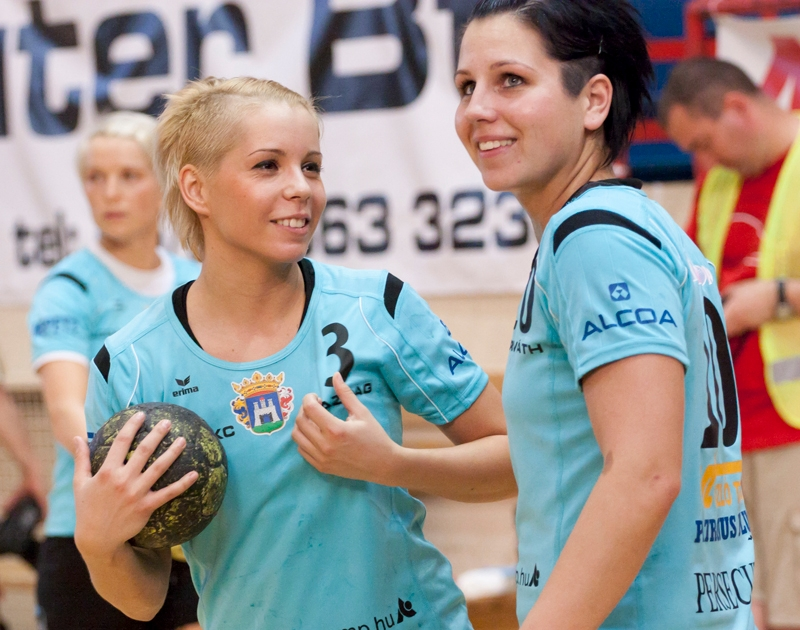
- Horváth (right) in 2011

Personal information
- Nationality: Hungarian
- Born: 10 May 1990 (age 36) Kapuvár, Hungary
- Height: 1.73 m (5 ft 8 in)

Sport
- Sport: Handball
- Position: Line player
- Current club: Mosonmagyaróvári KC SE
- Number: 10

Youth career
- Years: Team
- –2005: Fertőszentmiklósi KC
- 2005–2007: Győri ETO KC

Senior clubs
- Years: Team
- 2007–2009: Győri ETO KC
- 2009–2016: Alba Fehérvár KC
- 2016–2017: Dunaújvárosi KKA
- 2017–2021: Mosonmagyaróvári KC SE
National team
Years	Team	Apps	(Gls)
2012–2014	Hungary	8	(7)
- Updated on 22 July 2018

Bernadett Horváth (born 10 May 1990) is a retired Hungarian handballer.

She has been capped 27 times for the Hungarian junior national team, in which she has scored 55 goals.

== Achievements ==
- Nemzeti Bajnokság I:
  - Winner: 2008, 2009
- Nemzeti Bajnokság I/B:
  - Winner: 2018
- Magyar Kupa:
  - Winner: 2008, 2009
  - Bronze Medallist: 2011
- EHF Champions League:
  - Finalist: 2009
  - Semifinalist: 2008
- Junior European Championship:
  - Silver Medallist: 2009
