= Dóra Medgyessy =

Hungarian basketball player

No. 11 – Aluinvent DVTK
- Position: Point guard
- League: NB I/A

Personal information
- Born: July 21, 1986 (age 40) Debrecen, Hungary
- Listed height: 5 ft 8 in (1.73 m)

Career information
- Playing career: 2006–present

Career history
- 2006–2007: Kecskeméti KC
- 2007–2010: Debreceni EAC
- 2010–2012: KSC Szekszárd
- 2012–2013: Ceglédi EKK
- 2013–2015: MTK-Budapest
- 2015–2018: Ceglédi EKK
- 2018–present: Aluinvent DVTK
Medals
Women's 3x3 basketball
Representing Hungary
World Cup
Silver medal – second place	2019 Amsterdam	Team

Dóra Medgyessy (born July 21, 1986) is a Hungarian basketball player for Aluinvent DVTK and the Hungarian national team.

She participated at the EuroBasket Women 2017.
