= Dorina Zele =

Hungarian basketball player

PEAC-Pécs
- Position: Shooting guard
- League: NB I/A

Personal information
- Born: February 13, 1992 (age 34) Szolnok, Hungary
- Listed height: 6 ft 1 in (1.85 m)

Dorina Zele (born February 13, 1992) is a Hungarian basketball player who plays for PEAC-Pécs and the Hungarian national team.

She participated at the EuroBasket Women 2017.
