= Jessica Kuster =

American basketball player

Personal information
- Born: 20 August 1992 (age 34) Columbus, Ohio
- Listed height: 6 ft 2 in (1.88 m)

Career information
- High school: Reagan (San Antonio, Texas)
- College: Rice (2010–2014)
- WNBA draft: 2014: undrafted
- Playing career: 2014–2020
- Position: Forward
- Number: 30

Career history
- 2014–2015: CSU Alba Iulia
- 2015–2016: Basketball Nymburk
- 2016–2017: PEAC-Pécs
- 2017–2019: Ragusa
- 2019–2020: Sydney Uni Flames

Career highlights
- CUSA Defensive Player of the Year (2013); CUSA Freshman of the Year (2011); CUSA All-Freshman Team (2011); 4x CUSA All-Defensive Team (2011–2014); 4x First-team All-CUSA (2011–2014)

Jessica Kuster (born 20 August 1992) is an American professional basketball player.

== College ==
Kuster played college basketball at Rice University in Houston, Texas for the Owls.

=== Statistics ===
Year	Team	GP	GS	MPG	FG%	3P%	FT%	RPG	APG	SPG	BPG	TO	PPG
2010–11	Rice	32	22	29.0	.459	.352	.737	10.6	0.9	0.9	2.0	2.1	14.0
2011–12	Rice	30	30	32.0	.430	.281	.716	11.1	0.9	1.9	1.6	2.7	17.3
2012–13	Rice	30	30	34.0	.402	.228	.766	10.0	2.5	0.9	1.4	2.8	16.1
2013–14	Rice	30	30	37.0	.434	.339	.810	13.3	2.5	1.6	1.4	3.1	20.9
Career		122	112	25.1	.430	.299	.757	11.2	1.7	1.3	1.6	2.7	17.0

== Career ==
=== College career ===
The Rice all-time leading scorer (women or men) with 2,081 points... C-USA and Rice all-time leader in career double-doubles (67) ... C-USA and Rice all-time leader in rebounds (1,376) .... Only player to be named to both the First-Team All-Conference and the All-Defensive Team all four seasons ... One of 145 players in NCAA Div. I history to record over 2,000 career points and 1,000 career rebounds ... Joined Middle Tennessee's Ebony Rowe as the only players to have averaged a double double in each of their four seasons ... The quickest Rice player to reach 1,000 career points (two seasons and two games), the eighth to reach the milestone as the junior and the 18th Rice player overall to reach 1,000 points ... Rice record holder for career field goals made (745) and career made free throws (550).

=== WNBA ===
After going undrafted in 2014, Kuster was then signed by the San Antonio Stars to a training camp contract. Kuster was waived before the beginning of the season.

In 2015, Kuster was signed as a free-agent to the Tulsa Shock training camp roster. Kuster was waived in June during the final cuts ahead of the season.

=== Europe ===
In 2014, Kuster travelled to Europe to begin her professional career, signing with CSU Alba Iulia in the Liga Națională in Romania. In 2015, Kuster would remain in Europe, signing with Basketball Nymburk in the Czech National League. In her 2015–16 season with Nymburk, Kuster was both a Czech Cup champion and MVP. She was also named to the all import team. In her third professional year, Kuster signed with PEAC-Pécs in Hungary's Nemzeti Bajnokság I/A for 2016–17. In 2017, Kuster would debut in the Italian league, Serie A1, after signing with Ragusa. She would play two seasons with Ragusa and was an Italian Cup in her second season with the club.

=== WNBL ===
In May 2019, Kuster was signed by the Sydney Uni Flames in Australia's WNBL for the 2019–20 season. After a successful debut season in Australia, Kuster then announced that she would retire from basketball to pursue full-time ministry.
