= Aliaksandra Tarasava =

Belarusian basketball player

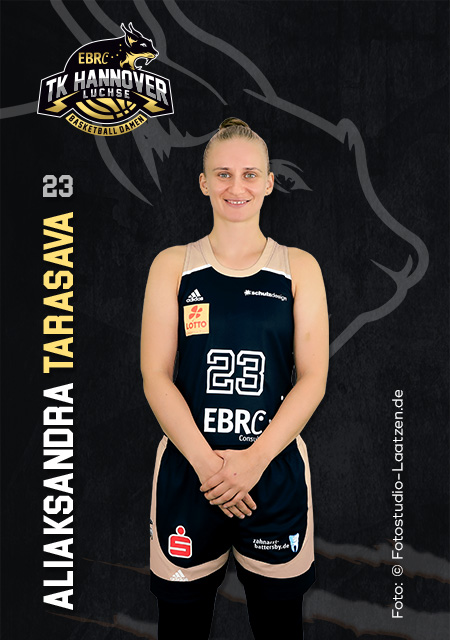

TSV 1880 Wasserburg
- Position: Point guard
- League: DBBL

Personal information
- Born: June 23, 1988 (age 38) Grodno, Soviet Union
- Listed height: 5 ft 7 in (1.70 m)

Aliaksandra Tarasava (born June 23, 1988) is a Belarusian basketball player for TSV 1880 Wasserburg and the Belarusian national team, where she participated at the 2014 FIBA World Championship.
