= Yanina Inkina =

Belarusian basketball player

No. 23 – FCC Baschet Arad
- Position: Power forward
- League: Liga Națională

Personal information
- Born: October 16, 1997 (age 27); Zhlobin, Belarus
- Listed height: 6 ft 2 in (1.88 m)

Career information
- College: South Plains (2015–2017); Little Rock (2017–2019)
- WNBA draft: 2019: undrafted

Career history
- 2019–present: FCC Baschet Arad

Yanina Inkina (born October 16, 1997) is a Belarusian basketball player for BC Horizont in Belarus and the Belarusian national team. She was a college player at the University of Arkansas at Little Rock for two seasons after moving from South Plains College.

She participated at the EuroBasket Women 2017.
