= Maja Škorić =

Serbian basketball player

No. 58 – KSC Szekszárd
- Position: Small forward
- League: First League of Hungary; EuroCup

Personal information
- Born: 10 November 1989 (age 37) Rijeka, SR Croatia, SFR Yugoslavia
- Listed height: 6 ft 1 in (1.85 m)

Career information
- WNBA draft: 2011: undrafted
- Playing career: 2005–present

Career history
- 2008–2009: Čelarevo
- 2009–2011: Hemofarm
- 2011–2013: Aluinvent Miskolc
- 2013–2014: ŠBK Šamorín
- 2014–2017: VBW CEKK Ceglèd
- 2017–2018: Basket Landes
- 2018–2020: Aluinvent Miskolc
- 2020: VBW CEKK Ceglèd
- 2020–present: KSC Szekszárd
Medals
Women's basketball
Representing Serbia
EuroBasket
Gold medal – first place	2021 France/Spain
Bronze medal – third place	2019 Latvia/Serbia

Maja Škorić (Serbian: Маја Шкорић; born 10 November 1989) is a Serbian professional basketball player for KSC Szekszárd of the Hungarian First League and the EuroCup Women. She represents Serbia national team internationally.

== Playing career ==
Škorić played for Čelarevo, Hemofarm (Serbia), Aluinvent Miskolc (Hungary), ŠBK Šamorín (Slovakia), VBW CEKK Ceglèd (Hungary) and Basket Landes (France).

== National team career ==
Škorić was a member of the Serbia national team that participated at the EuroBasket Women 2017 in the Czech Republic. Over four tournament games, she averaged 4.5 points, 3.8 rebounds and 1.2 assists per game. She was a member of the national team that won bronze medal at the EuroBasket Women 2019 in Serbia. Over five tournament games, she averaged 2.8 points and 1.2 rebounds per game.
