= Péter Völgyi =

Hungarian sprint canoeist

Medal record

Men's canoe sprint

World Championships
Silver medal – second place	1971 Belgrade	K-1 10000 m
Silver medal – second place	1973 Tampere	K-1 10000 m
Bronze medal – third place	1970 Copenhagen	K-1 10000 m
Bronze medal – third place	1974 Mexico City	K-1 10000 m

Péter Völgyi is a Hungarian sprint canoeist who competed in the early 1970s. He won four medals in the K-1 10000 m events at the ICF Canoe Sprint World Championships with two silvers (1971, 1973) and two bronzes (1970, 1974).
