= Volha Ziuzkova =

Belarusian basketball player

No. 9 – Hoptrans Sirenos
- Position: Point guard
- League: LMKL

Personal information
- Born: June 14, 1983 (age 43) Masty, Soviet Union
- Listed height: 5 ft 8 in (1.73 m)

Volha Ziuzkova (born June 14, 1983) is a Belarusian basketball player for Hoptrans Sirenos and the Belarusian national team, where she participated at the 2014 FIBA World Championship.
