= Anastasiya Verameyenka =

Belarusian basketball player

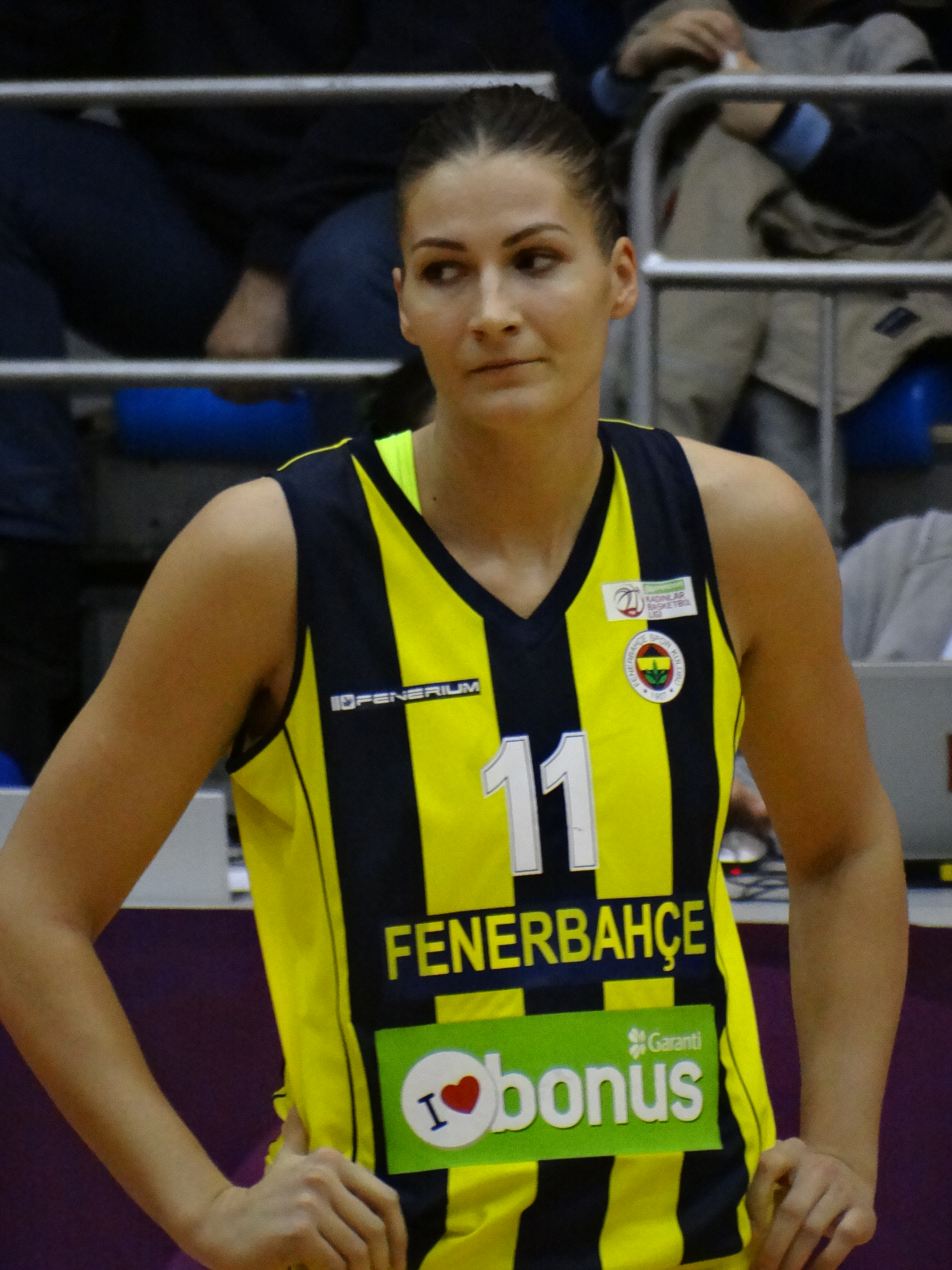
- Verameyenka in 2017

No. 11 – Horizont Minsk
- Position: Power forward
- League: TKBL; EuroLeague Women

Personal information
- Born: 10 July 1987 (age 39) Kohtla-Järve, Estonian SSR, Soviet Union
- Listed height: 6 ft 4 in (1.93 m)
- Listed weight: 180 lb (82 kg)

Career information
- Playing career: 2004–present

Career history
- 2004–2005: BK Minsk
- 2005–2012: Nadezhda Orenburg
- 2012–2014: Fenerbahçe Istanbul
- 2014–2015: Horizont Minsk
- 2015–2019: Fenerbahçe Istanbul
- 2020–present: Horizont Minsk

Anastasiya Uladzimirawna Verameyenka (Belarusian: Анастасія Уладзіміраўна Верамеенка, Russian: Анастасия Владимировна Веремеенко, born 10 July 1987) is a Belarusian professional women's basketball player who plays for Horizont Minsk. Veremeyenka was part of the Belarus women's national basketball teams that won a bronze medal at EuroBasket Women 2007 and placed sixth at the 2008 Olympics. Her elder brother Vladimir Veremeenko is also a professional basketball player.
