= Yuliya Rytsikava =

Belarusian basketball player

No. 7 – Horizont Minsk
- Position: Shooting guard
- League: BPL

Personal information
- Born: September 8, 1986 (age 40) Smarhon, Soviet Union
- Listed height: 5 ft 11 in (1.80 m)

Yuliya Rytsikava (born September 8, 1986) is a Belarusian basketball player. She represented Belarus in the basketball competition at the 2016 Summer Olympics.
