= Nataliya Trafimava =

Belarusian basketball player

Personal information
- Born: 16 June 1979 (age 47) Choir, Mongolia
- Listed height: 6 ft 0 in (1.83 m)
- Listed weight: 171 lb (78 kg)
- Position: Forward

Nataliya Trafimava (born 16 June 1979) is a retired Belarusian basketball player who competed in the 2008 Summer Olympics.
