= Horizont Minsk =

Belarusian basketball club

BC Horizont Minsk
- Leagues: Belarusian League
- Founded: 2010
- Location: Minsk region, Belarus
- Team colors: White and purple
- President: Dmitriy Lvovich
- Head coach: Natalia Trofimova
- Championships: 6 Belarusian League: 2011, 2012, 2016, 2021, 2022, 2023; 8 Belarusian Cup: 2012, 2013, 2014, 2016, 2021, 2022, 2024, 2025; 1 EWBL: 2021
- Website: bc-horizont.com
| Home | Away |

BC Horizont is a Belarusian women's basketball club from Minsk region. The team has been Belarusian League champions in 2011, 2012, 2016, 2021, 2022, and 2023, Belarusian Cup winners in 2012, 2013, 2014, 2016, 2021, 2022, 2024, and 2025, and EWBL champions in 2021.

It has appeared in the Ronchetti Cup (1993, 1994) and the FIBA EuroCup.

== 2022-23 squad ==
- (United States) Adrianna Webb (1.78)
- (Serbia) Irena Vrancic (1.65)
- (Belarus) Yulia Rytsikava (1.80)
- (Belarus) Olga Ziuzkova (1.71)
- (Belarus) Natallia Anufrienko (1.74)
- (Belarus) Maria Trafimenkava (1.67)
- (Belarus) Viktoryia Hasper (1.93)
- (Belarus) Yanina Inkina (1.86)
- (Belarus) Anastasiya Veremeenko (1.95)
- (Belarus) Yana Lebedich (1.88)
