= Olimpia Grodno =

Belarusian basketball club

- Leagues: BPL
- Arena: Grodno Sports Centre
- Location: Grodno, Belarus
- Team colors: White and black
- President: Viktor Shnipko
- Head coach: Valentina Melnikova
- Championships: 2 Belarusian Leagues
Home	Away

SBK Olimpia Grodno is a Belarusian women's basketball club from Grodno. It won the Belarusian Championship in 2007 and 2009, and in 2012 it made its debut in the FIBA Eurocup.
