= Tatsiana Likhtarovich =

Belarusian basketball player

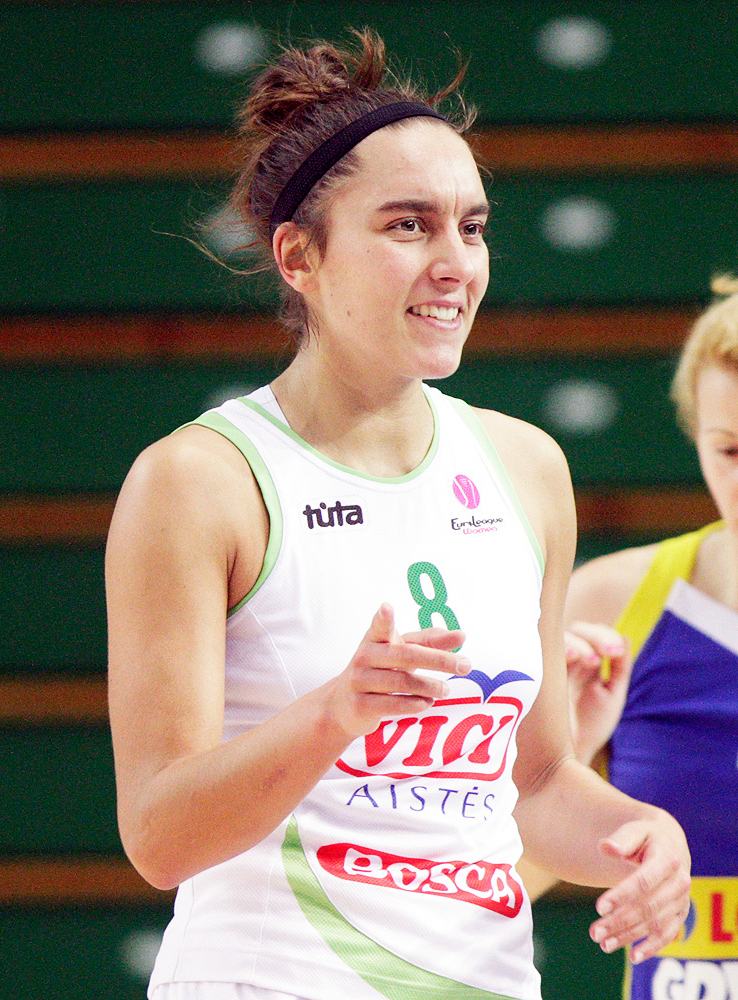

No. 8 – UNI Győr
- Position: Shooting guard
- League: NB I/A

Personal information
- Born: 29 March 1988 (age 38) Minsk, Soviet Union
- Listed height: 5 ft 10 in (1.78 m)

Tatsiana Likhtarovich (Таццяна Аляксандраўна Ліхтаровіч, born 29 March 1988) is a Belarusian basketball player who competed in the 2008 Summer Olympics.
