= EuroBasket Women 2011 squads =

This article displays the rosters for the teams competing at the EuroBasket Women 2011. Each teams had to submit 12 players.

== Group A ==
=== Lithuania ===
Lithuania Women's National Basketball Team roster
Players
Coaches

Pos.	No.	Name	Age – Date of birth	Height	Club
PG	4	Gabriele Gutkauskaite	20 – 26 October 1990	1.72 m (5 ft 8 in)	Lemminkainen Klaipėda	(Lithuania)
G	5	Milda Sauliute	29 – 28 August 1981	1.75 m (5 ft 9 in)	VICI Aistes Kaunas	(Lithuania)
G/F	6	Marina Solopova	21 – 13 February 1990	1.80 m (5 ft 11 in)	VICI Aistes Kaunas	(Lithuania)
SG	7	Ausra Bimbaite	28 – 10 October 1982	1.79 m (5 ft 10 in)	Vici Aistes Kaunas	(Lithuania)
F/C	8	Agne Abromaite	32 – 15 January 1979	1.90 m (6 ft 3 in)	Ros Casares Valencia	(Spain)
PG	9	Rima Valentiene	33 – 10 June 1978	1.70 m (5 ft 7 in)	VICI Aistes Kaunas	(Lithuania)
G/F	10	Mante Kvederaviciute	20 – 28 November 1990	1.80 m (5 ft 11 in)	Laisve Kaunas	(Lithuania)
C	11	Gintarė Petronytė	22 – 19 March 1989	1.96 m (6 ft 5 in)	Galatasaray Medical Park	(Turkey)
F/C	12	Giedre Paugaite	20 – 15 July 1990	1.92 m (6 ft 4 in)	VICI Aistes Kaunas	(Lithuania)
G	13	Sandra Linkeviciene	29 – 1 February 1982	1.76 m (5 ft 9 in)	Dynamo Kursk	(Russia)
PF	14	Egle Sulciute	25 – 31 August 1985	1.90 m (6 ft 3 in)	Banco Simeón Celta de Vigo	(Spain)
PF	15	Vaida Sipaviciute	25 – 6 November 1985	1.93 m (6 ft 4 in)	Atletico Faenza	(Italy)

Head coach

- (Lithuania) Algirdas Paulauskas

Legend

- (C) Team captain
- nat field describes country
  of last club
  before the tournament
- field is age on June 18, 2011

=== Russia ===
The roster was announced on June 16.

Russia Women's National Basketball Team roster
Players
Coaches

Pos.	No.	Name	Age – Date of birth	Height	Club
F	4	Olga Arteshina	28 – 27 November 1982	1.88 m (6 ft 2 in)	UMMC Ekaterinburg	(Russia)
G	5	Evgenia Belyakova	24 – 27 June 1986	1.82 m (6 ft 0 in)	Spartak St. Petersburg	(Russia)
G	6	Tatiana Popova	26 – 17 September 1984	1.79 m (5 ft 10 in)	WBC Dynamo Moscow	(Russia)
C	7	Marina Kuzina	25 – 19 July 1985	1.95 m (6 ft 5 in)	WBC Dynamo Moscow	(Russia)
SG	8	Elena Danilochkina	25 – 27 January 1986	1.82 m (6 ft 0 in)	Chevakata Vologda	(Russia)
C	9	Natalya Myasoedova	24 – 13 February 1987	1.93 m (6 ft 4 in)	Dynamo GUVD	(Russia)
G/F	10	Ilona Korstin	31 – 30 May 1980	1.83 m (6 ft 0 in)	Sparta&K M. R. Vidnoje	(Russia)
C	11	Maria Stepanova	32 – 23 February 1979	2.03 m (6 ft 8 in)	UMMC Ekaterinburg	(Russia)
F/C	12	Irina Osipova	30 – 5 June 1981	1.96 m (6 ft 5 in)	Sparta&K M. R. Vidnoje	(Russia)
F	13	Liudmila Sapova	27 – 3 May 1984	1.85 m (6 ft 1 in)	Nadezhda Orenburg	(Russia)
F	14	Svetlana Abrosimova	30 – 9 July 1980	1.85 m (6 ft 1 in)	UMMC Ekaterinburg	(Russia)
C	15	Tatiana Vidmer	25 – 8 January 1986	1.91 m (6 ft 3 in)	UMMC Ekaterinburg	(Russia)

Head coach

- (Russia) Boris Sokolovsky

Legend

- (C) Team captain
- nat field describes country
  of last club
  before the tournament
- field is age on June 18, 2011

=== Slovakia ===
Slovakia Women's National Basketball Team roster
Players
Coaches

Pos.	No.	Name	Age – Date of birth	Height	Club
G	4	Zuzana Brezániova	24 – 4 March 1987	1.75 m (5 ft 9 in)	Whirlpool Poprad	(Slovakia)
PG	5	Darina Misurová	29 – 25 September 1981	1.69 m (5 ft 7 in)	Atletico Faenza	(Italy)
F	6	Lucia Kupčíková	26 – 28 August 1984	1.86 m (6 ft 1 in)	Good Angels Košice	(Slovakia)
F/C	7	Katarina Tetemondová	22 – 24 September 1988	1.88 m (6 ft 2 in)	MBK Ružomberok	(Slovakia)
G	9	Michaela Ábelová	25 – 27 August 1985	1.78 m (5 ft 10 in)	SV Halle Lions	(Germany)
C	10	Regina Palusna	22 – 6 June 1989	1.92 m (6 ft 4 in)	Pécs 2010	(Hungary)
C	11	Klaudia Lukacovicová	30 – 25 November 1980	1.93 m (6 ft 4 in)	MBK Ružomberok	(Slovakia)
C	12	Anna Jurcenkova	25 – 26 July 1985	1.95 m (6 ft 5 in)	Good Angels Košice	(Slovakia)
PG	13	Gabriela Kubatova	27 – 26 May 1984	1.72 m (5 ft 8 in)	Roche Vendée Basket	(France)
C	14	Romana Vynuchalova	24 – 3 September 1986	1.92 m (6 ft 4 in)	Extrugasa Vilagarcia	(Spain)
SG	15	Luisa Michulková	26 – 26 July 1984	1.80 m (5 ft 11 in)	Banco Simeón Celta de Vigo	(Spain)
PF	35	Erin Lawless	26 – 6 May 1985	1.85 m (6 ft 1 in)	Good Angels Košice	(Slovakia)

Head coach

- (Slovakia) Natalia Hejkova

Legend

- (C) Team captain
- nat field describes country
  of last club
  before the tournament
- field is age on June 18, 2011

=== Turkey ===
Turkey Women's National Basketball Team roster
Players
Coaches

Pos.	No.	Name	Age – Date of birth	Height	Club
SG	4	Tuğba Palazoğlu	30 – 4 December 1980	1.72 m (5 ft 8 in)	Galatasaray Medical Park	(Turkey)
SG	5	Seda Erdoğan	23 – 6 August 1987	1.75 m (5 ft 9 in)	Tarsus Belediyesi	(Turkey)
PG	6	Birsel Vardarlı	26 – 12 July 1984	1.75 m (5 ft 9 in)	Fenerbahçe	(Turkey)
PG	7	Nilay Kartaltepe	32 – 13 January 1979	1.72 m (5 ft 8 in)	Beşiktaş Cola Turka	(Turkey)
PF	8	Nevin Nevlin	26 – 8 May 1985	1.95 m (6 ft 5 in)	Fenerbahçe	(Turkey)
F	9	Gülşah Akkaya	33 – 6 October 1977	1.81 m (5 ft 11 in)	Samsun Basketbol	(Turkey)
G	10	Işıl Alben	25 – 22 February 1986	1.72 m (5 ft 8 in)	Galatasaray Medical Park	(Turkey)
C	11	Nevriye Yılmaz	31 – 16 June 1980	1.94 m (6 ft 4 in)	Fenerbahçe	(Turkey)
F/C	12	Naile İvegin	26 – 29 May 1985	1.85 m (6 ft 1 in)	Tarsus Belediyesi	(Turkey)
F/C	13	Yasemin Horasan	27 – 1 August 1983	1.87 m (6 ft 2 in)	Beşiktaş Cola Turka	(Turkey)
F	14	Şaziye İvegin	29 – 8 February 1982	1.82 m (6 ft 0 in)	Fenerbahçe	(Turkey)
PF	15	Bahar Çağlar	22 – 28 September 1988	1.88 m (6 ft 2 in)	Galatasaray Medical Park	(Turkey)

Head coach

- (Turkey) Ceyhun Yıldızoğlu

Legend

- (C) Team captain
- nat field describes country
  of last club
  before the tournament
- field is age on June 18, 2011

== Group B ==
=== Belarus ===
Belarus Women's National Basketball Team roster
Players
Coaches

Pos.	No.	Name	Age – Date of birth	Height	Club
G	4	Sviatlana Valko	21 – 12 July 1989	1.75 m (5 ft 9 in)	BC Horizont Minsk	(Belarus)
G	5	Aliaksandra Tarasava	22 – 23 June 1988	1.70 m (5 ft 7 in)	MBK Ružomberok	(Slovakia)
SF	6	Katsiaryna Snytsina	25 – 2 September 1985	1.88 m (6 ft 2 in)	Nadezhda Orenburg	(Russia)
F	7	Yuliya Dureika	24 – 8 September 1986	1.79 m (5 ft 10 in)	BC Horizont Minsk	(Belarus)
G/F	8	Tatsiana Likhtarovich	23 – 29 March 1988	1.77 m (5 ft 10 in)	BC Horizont Minsk	(Belarus)
G	9	Natallia Anufryienka	26 – 11 June 1985	1.74 m (5 ft 9 in)	BC Horizont Minsk	(Belarus)
C	10	Anastasiya Verameyenka	23 – 10 July 1987	1.92 m (6 ft 4 in)	Nadezhda Orenburg	(Russia)
C	11	Yelena Leuchanka	28 – 30 April 1983	1.96 m (6 ft 5 in)	TS Wisła Can-Pack Kraków	(Poland)
G	12	Natallia Marchanka	32 – 19 May 1979	1.70 m (5 ft 7 in)	WBC Dynamo Moscow	(Russia)
F	13	Tatyana Troina	29 – 30 June 1981	1.88 m (6 ft 2 in)	BC Horizont Minsk	(Belarus)
PF	14	Nataliya Trafimava	32 – 16 June 1979	1.86 m (6 ft 1 in)	CCC Polkowice	(Poland)
C	15	Marina Kress	30 – 23 August 1980	1.92 m (6 ft 4 in)	Sony Athinaikos Athens	(Greece)

Head coach

- (Belarus) Anatoli Buyalski

Legend

- (C) Team captain
- nat field describes country
  of last club
  before the tournament
- field is age on June 18, 2011

=== Czech Republic ===
Czech Republic Women's National Basketball Team roster
Players
Coaches

Pos.	No.	Name	Age – Date of birth	Height	Club
F	4	Jana Veselá	27 – 31 December 1983	1.94 m (6 ft 4 in)	Ros Casares Valencia	(Spain)
PF	5	Alena Hanušová	20 – 29 May 1991	1.90 m (6 ft 3 in)	Frisco SIKA Brno	(Czech Republic)
PF	6	Romana Hejdova	23 – 9 May 1988	1.84 m (6 ft 0 in)	Frisco SIKA Brno	(Czech Republic)
F	7	Michaela Zrůstová	24 – 4 April 1987	1.86 m (6 ft 1 in)	VALOSUN Brno	(Czech Republic)
C	8	Ilona Burgrová	27 – 15 March 1984	1.94 m (6 ft 4 in)	CJM Bourges	(France)
PG	9	Katerina Bartonova	21 – 17 January 1990	1.72 m (5 ft 8 in)	USK Praha	(Czech Republic)
G	10	Veronika Bortelová	33 – 11 June 1978	1.69 m (5 ft 7 in)	Energa Toruń	(Poland)
SG	11	Katerina Elhotova	21 – 14 October 1989	1.80 m (5 ft 11 in)	USK Praha	(Czech Republic)
C	12	Michala Hartigová	27 – 14 November 1983	1.92 m (6 ft 4 in)	Sokol Hradec Králové	(Czech Republic)
C	13	Petra Kulichová	26 – 13 September 1984	1.98 m (6 ft 6 in)	USK Praha	(Czech Republic)
C	14	Zora Skrabalová	29 – 13 October 1981	1.90 m (6 ft 3 in)	WBC Czech coal Aldast Strakonice	(Czech Republic)
SF	15	Eva Vitecková	29 – 26 January 1982	1.90 m (6 ft 3 in)	USK Praha	(Czech Republic)

Head coach

- (Czech Republic) Lubor Blažek

Legend

- (C) Team captain
- nat field describes country
  of last club
  before the tournament
- field is age on June 18, 2011

=== Great Britain ===
The roster was announced on June 14.

Great Britain Women's National Basketball Team roster
Players
Coaches

Pos.	No.	Name	Age – Date of birth	Height	Club
G	4	Natalie Stafford	34 – 8 December 1976	1.75 m (5 ft 9 in)	Standard Life Senior Women	(England)
PF	5	Rosalee Mason	32 – 24 April 1979	1.80 m (5 ft 11 in)	City of Sheffield Hatters	(England)
SG	6	Stefanie Collins	28 – 30 December 1982	1.68 m (5 ft 6 in)	Cardiff Metropolitan University	(Wales)
PG	7	Rachael Vanderwal	27 – 27 June 1983	1.76 m (5 ft 9 in)	University of Limerick	(Republic of Ireland)
SF	8	Chantelle Handy	24 – 16 June 1987	1.91 m (6 ft 3 in)	Marshall University	(United States)
SF	9	Kate Butters	24 – 25 July 1986	1.78 m (5 ft 10 in)	Cardiff Metropolitan University	(Wales)
PF	10	Julie Page	28 – 21 April 1983	1.88 m (6 ft 2 in)	Pays d'Aix Basket 13	(France)
PF	11	Kimberly Butler	28 – 7 September 1982	1.86 m (6 ft 1 in)	Panionios	(Greece)
G	12	Lauren Thomas-Johnson	23 – 25 May 1988	1.80 m (5 ft 11 in)	Marquette University	(United States)
G	13	Johannah Leedham	23 – 5 December 1987	1.80 m (5 ft 11 in)	Franklin Pierce University	(United States)
C	14	Azania Stewart	22 – 13 March 1989	1.95 m (6 ft 5 in)	University of Florida	(United States)
G	15	Rose Anderson	23 – 23 March 1988	1.78 m (5 ft 10 in)	University of Central Oklahoma	(United States)

Head coach

- (United Kingdom) Tom Maher

Legend

- (C) Team captain
- nat field describes country
  of last club
  before the tournament
- field is age on June 18, 2011

=== Israel ===
Israel Women's National Basketball Team roster
Players
Coaches

Pos.	No.	Name	Age – Date of birth	Height	Club
PF	4	Liad Suez Karni	30 – 21 April 1981	1.87 m (6 ft 2 in)	Elitzur Netanya	(Israel)
SG	5	Meirav Dori	25 – 25 May 1986	1.78 m (5 ft 10 in)	Electra Ramat HaSharon	(Israel)
G	6	Noa Ganor	25 – 6 April 1986	1.72 m (5 ft 8 in)	Electra Ramat HaSharon	(Israel)
G	7	Liron Cohen	28 – 5 August 1982	1.73 m (5 ft 8 in)	Beretta Famila Schio	(Italy)
G	8	Shay Doron	26 – 1 April 1985	1.75 m (5 ft 9 in)	Elitzur Ramla	(Israel)
PG	9	Shiran Zairy	25 – 18 January 1986	1.66 m (5 ft 5 in)	Elitzur Ramla	(Israel)
PG	10	Laine Selwyn	30 – 16 May 1981	1.72 m (5 ft 8 in)	Elitzur Ramla	(Israel)
F	12	Michal Epstein	30 – 5 March 1981	1.80 m (5 ft 11 in)	Maccabi Ramat Hen	(Israel)
F	13	Ekaterina Abramzon	23 – 1 July 1987	1.85 m (6 ft 1 in)	Electra Ramat HaSharon	(Israel)
PF	14	Katia Levitsky	25 – 2 November 1985	1.90 m (6 ft 3 in)	Maccabi Bnot Ashdod	(Israel)
C	15	Jennifer Fleischer	27 – 17 February 1984	1.93 m (6 ft 4 in)	Challes-les-Eaux Savoie	(France)
PG	21	Naama Shafir	21 – 28 February 1990	1.70 m (5 ft 7 in)	Toledo Rockets	(United States)

Head coach

- (Israel) Eli Rabi

Legend

- (C) Team captain
- nat field describes country
  of last club
  before the tournament
- field is age on June 18, 2011

== Group C ==
=== Germany ===
Germany Women's National Basketball Team roster
Players
Coaches

Pos.	No.	Name	Age – Date of birth	Height	Club
PG	4	Lea Mersch	23 – 28 September 1987	1.70 m (5 ft 7 in)	evo NB Oberhausen	(Germany)
SG	5	Anne Breitreiner	26 – 7 September 1984	1.83 m (6 ft 0 in)	Athletico Faenza	(Italy)
PG	6	Dorothea Richter	28 – 25 April 1983	1.78 m (5 ft 10 in)	HELI Donau-Ries	(Germany)
C	7	Lisa Koop	25 – 23 September 1985	1.97 m (6 ft 6 in)	BC pharmaserv Marburg	(Germany)
SG	8	Sarah Austmann	26 – 31 January 1985	1.78 m (5 ft 10 in)	evo NB Oberhausen	(Germany)
SF	9	Stephanie Wagner	20 – 8 July 1990	1.81 m (5 ft 11 in)	Rhein Main Baskets	(Germany)
SF	10	Romy Bär	24 – 17 May 1987	1.87 m (6 ft 2 in)	Challes-les-Eaux Savoie	(France)
PG	11	Tina Menz	22 – 24 August 1988	1.74 m (5 ft 9 in)	Leeds Carnegie	(United Kingdom)
SG	12	Birte Thimm	24 – 6 March 1987	1.80 m (5 ft 11 in)	evo NB Oberhausen	(Germany)
PF	13	Svenja Greunke	21 – 22 July 1989	1.87 m (6 ft 2 in)	Rhein Main Baskets/TV Langen	(Germany)
C	14	Katharina Kühn	30 – 1 October 1980	1.92 m (6 ft 4 in)	TSV Wasserburg	(Germany)
C	15	Petra Gläser	29 – 5 October 1981	1.94 m (6 ft 4 in)	Kvarnby Basket	(Sweden)

Head coach

- (Germany) Bastian Wernthaler

Legend

- (C) Team captain
- nat field describes country
  of last club
  before the tournament
- field is age on June 18, 2011

=== Montenegro ===
Montenegro Women's National Basketball Team roster
Players
Coaches

Pos.	No.	Name	Age – Date of birth	Height	Club
F	4	Sanja Knežević	27 – 23 January 1984	1.85 m (6 ft 1 in)	Jedinstvo Bijelo Polje	(Montenegro)
G	5	Jelena Škerović	30 – 23 December 1980	1.77 m (5 ft 10 in)	Frisco SIKA Brno	(Czech Republic)
SG	6	Anna DeForge	35 – 14 April 1976	1.78 m (5 ft 10 in)	Hondarribia Irún	(Spain)
F	7	Ana Baletić	25 – 19 July 1985	1.85 m (6 ft 1 in)	Sony Athinaikos Athens	(Greece)
C	8	Milica Jovanović	21 – 14 August 1989	1.89 m (6 ft 2 in)	Liomatic Umbertide	(Italy)
G	9	Snežana Aleksić	22 – 14 January 1989	1.73 m (5 ft 8 in)	Gospić	(Croatia)
F	10	Jelena Dubljević	24 – 7 May 1987	1.88 m (6 ft 2 in)	Tarbes Gespe Bigorre	(France)
C	11	Milka Bjelica	29 – 22 June 1981	1.93 m (6 ft 4 in)	Lotos VBW Clima Gdynia	(Poland)
C	12	Iva Perovanović	27 – 1 September 1983	1.88 m (6 ft 2 in)	Lattes Montpellier	(France)
C	13	Ana Turčinović	17 – 20 October 1993	1.90 m (6 ft 3 in)	Merkur Celje	(Slovenia)
C	14	Nataša Popović	29 – 14 April 1982	1.95 m (6 ft 5 in)	Jedinstvo Bijelo Polje	(Montenegro)
G	15	Maja Milutinović	23 – 2 October 1987	1.75 m (5 ft 9 in)	Voždovac	(Serbia)

Head coach

- (Montenegro) Miodrag Baletić

Legend

- (C) Team captain
- nat field describes country
  of last club
  before the tournament
- field is age on June 18, 2011

=== Poland ===
The roster was announced on June 16.

Poland Women's National Basketball Team roster
Players
Coaches

Pos.	No.	Name	Age – Date of birth	Height	Club
G	4	Katarzyna Dźwigalska	25 – 25 August 1985	1.74 m (5 ft 9 in)	AZS PWSZ Gorzów Wielkopolski	(Poland)
PG	5	Anna Pietrzak	23 – 5 November 1987	1.67 m (5 ft 6 in)	CCC Polkowice	(Poland)
PG	6	Paulina Pawlak	26 – 1 July 1984	1.70 m (5 ft 7 in)	TS Wisła Can-Pack Kraków	(Poland)
F	7	Agnieszka Szott	29 – 23 March 1982	1.86 m (6 ft 1 in)	Artego Bydgoszcz	(Poland)
F	8	Justyna Żurowska	26 – 8 March 1985	1.88 m (6 ft 2 in)	AZS PWSZ Gorzów Wielkopolski	(Poland)
F	9	Małgorzata Babicka	25 – 6 September 1985	1.87 m (6 ft 2 in)	KS Cukierki Odra Brzeg	(Poland)
SG	11	Elżbieta Mowlik	32 – 24 April 1979	1.80 m (5 ft 11 in)	AZS Poznań	(Poland)
PF	12	Patrycja Gulak	29 – 16 May 1982	1.90 m (6 ft 3 in)	Basket Ardennes	(France)
C	13	Ewelina Kobryn	29 – 7 May 1982	1.93 m (6 ft 4 in)	TS Wisła Can-Pack Kraków	(Poland)
C	15	Aleksandra Chomać	26 – 24 April 1985	1.90 m (6 ft 3 in)	Lider Pruszków	(Poland)
PF	20	Agnieszka Kaczmarczyk	22 – 23 May 1989	1.88 m (6 ft 2 in)	AZS PWSZ Gorzów Wielkopolski	(Poland)
F	22	Agnieszka Skobel	22 – 16 January 1989	1.78 m (5 ft 10 in)	AZS PWSZ Gorzów Wielkopolski	(Poland)

Head coach

- (Poland) Dariusz Maciejewski

Legend

- (C) Team captain
- nat field describes country
  of last club
  before the tournament
- field is age on June 18, 2011

=== Spain ===
The roster was announced on June 16.

Spain Women's National Basketball Team roster
Players
Coaches

Pos.	No.	Name	Age – Date of birth	Height	Club
C	4	Laura Nicholls	22 – 26 February 1989	1.89 m (6 ft 2 in)	Rivas Ecópolis	(Spain)
F/C	5	Cindy Lima	29 – 21 June 1981	1.96 m (6 ft 5 in)	Ros Casares Valencia	(Spain)
PG	6	Silvia Dominguez	24 – 31 January 1987	1.67 m (5 ft 6 in)	Perfumerías Avenida Baloncesto	(Spain)
G	7	Alba Torrens	21 – 30 August 1989	1.92 m (6 ft 4 in)	Perfumerías Avenida Baloncesto	(Spain)
C	8	Lucila Pascua	28 – 21 March 1983	1.95 m (6 ft 5 in)	Mann Filter Zaragoza	(Spain)
G	9	Laia Palau	31 – 10 September 1979	1.78 m (5 ft 10 in)	Ros Casares Valencia	(Spain)
G	10	Elisa Aguilar	34 – 15 October 1976	1.72 m (5 ft 8 in)	Rivas Ecópolis	(Spain)
G	11	Marta Xargay	20 – 20 December 1990	1.80 m (5 ft 11 in)	Perfumerías Avenida Baloncesto	(Spain)
PF	12	Anna Montañana	30 – 24 October 1980	1.86 m (6 ft 1 in)	Perfumerías Avenida Baloncesto	(Spain)
SF	13	Amaya Valdemoro	34 – 18 August 1976	1.83 m (6 ft 0 in)	Rivas Ecópolis	(Spain)
PF	14	Sancho Lyttle	27 – 20 September 1983	1.90 m (6 ft 3 in)	Perfumerías Avenida Baloncesto	(Spain)
G/F	15	Anna Cruz	24 – 27 October 1986	1.74 m (5 ft 9 in)	Rivas Ecópolis	(Spain)

Head coach

- (Spain) Jose Ignacio Hernandez

Legend

- (C) Team captain
- nat field describes country
  of last club
  before the tournament
- field is age on June 18, 2011

== Group D ==
=== Croatia ===
Croatia Women's National Basketball Team roster
Players
Coaches

Pos.	No.	Name	Age – Date of birth	Height	Club
SG	4	Sandra Mandir	33 – 4 August 1977	1.74 m (5 ft 9 in)	Gospić	(Croatia)
SF	5	Lisa Karčić	24 – 11 November 1986	1.77 m (5 ft 10 in)	Keflavik	(Iceland)
G	6	Antonija Mišura	23 – 19 May 1988	1.78 m (5 ft 10 in)	Šibenik	(Croatia)
G	7	Marta Čakić	28 – 16 August 1982	1.75 m (5 ft 9 in)	Šibenik	(Croatia)
F	8	Neda Lokas	25 – 5 August 1985	1.79 m (5 ft 10 in)	Šibenik	(Croatia)
F/C	9	Mirna Mazić	25 – 24 December 1985	1.88 m (6 ft 2 in)	Panionios	(Greece)
PG	10	Iva Ciglar	25 – 12 December 1985	1.69 m (5 ft 7 in)	Spartak Saint Petersburg	(Russia)
F	11	Ana Lelas	28 – 2 April 1983	1.82 m (6 ft 0 in)	Lattes-Montpellier	(France)
F/C	12	Iva Slišković	26 – 4 September 1984	1.90 m (6 ft 3 in)	Banco Simeón Celta de Vigo	(Spain)
C	13	Sena Pavetić	25 – 12 January 1986	1.98 m (6 ft 6 in)	Gospić	(Croatia)
C	14	Luca Ivanković	23 – 26 September 1987	1.99 m (6 ft 6 in)	Šibenik	(Croatia)
SF	15	Jelena Ivezić	27 – 17 March 1984	1.80 m (5 ft 11 in)	Gospić	(Croatia)

Head coach

- (Croatia) Stipe Bralić

Legend

- (C) Team captain
- nat field describes country
  of last club
  before the tournament
- field is age on June 18, 2011

=== France ===
France Women's National Basketball Team roster
Players
Coaches

Pos.	No.	Name	Age – Date of birth	Height	Club
C	4	Isabelle Yacoubou-Dehoui	25 – 21 April 1986	1.90 m (6 ft 3 in)	Beretta Famila Schio	(Italy)
PF	5	Endene Miyem	23 – 15 May 1988	1.88 m (6 ft 2 in)	CJM Bourges	(France)
G	6	Clémence Beikes	27 – 19 October 1983	1.80 m (5 ft 11 in)	Union Hainaut	(France)
C	7	Sandrine Gruda	23 – 25 June 1987	1.93 m (6 ft 4 in)	UMMC Ekaterinburg	(Russia)
PG	8	Edwige Lawson-Wade	32 – 14 May 1979	1.66 m (5 ft 5 in)	San Antonio Silver Stars	(United States)
PG	9	Celine Dumerc	28 – 9 July 1982	1.69 m (5 ft 7 in)	UMMC Ekaterinburg	(Russia)
F	10	Jennifer Digbeu	24 – 14 April 1987	1.90 m (6 ft 3 in)	CJM Bourges	(France)
SG	11	Émilie Gomis	27 – 18 October 1983	1.78 m (5 ft 10 in)	ESB Lille Metropole	(France)
G	12	Florence Lepron	26 – 16 January 1985	1.83 m (6 ft 0 in)	Tarbes Gespe Bigorre	(France)
G/F	13	Marion Laborde	24 – 9 December 1986	1.78 m (5 ft 10 in)	Basket Landes	(France)
C	14	Emmeline Ndongue	28 – 25 April 1983	1.92 m (6 ft 4 in)	CJM Bourges	(France)
F/C	15	Aurélie Bonnan	27 – 1 August 1983	1.87 m (6 ft 2 in)	USO Mondeville	(France)

Head coach

- (France) Pierre Vincent

Legend

- (C) Team captain
- nat field describes country
  of last club
  before the tournament
- field is age on June 18, 2011

=== Greece ===
Greece Women's National Basketball Team roster
Players
Coaches

Pos.	No.	Name	Age – Date of birth	Height	Club
G	4	Dimitra Kalentzou	33 – 3 January 1978	1.74 m (5 ft 9 in)	Sony Athinaikos Athens	(Greece)
SG	5	Evdokia Stamati	26 – 2 August 1984	1.78 m (5 ft 10 in)	FEA Neas	(Greece)
SF	6	Zoi Dimitrakou	24 – 25 May 1987	1.88 m (6 ft 2 in)	Pays d'Aix Basket 13	(France)
G/F	7	Olga Chatzinikolaou	29 – 4 July 1981	1.81 m (5 ft 11 in)	Sony Athinaikos Athens	(Greece)
F	8	Styliani Kaltsidou	28 – 12 January 1983	1.88 m (6 ft 2 in)	CJM Bourges	(France)
G/F	9	Evanthia Maltsi	32 – 30 December 1978	1.80 m (5 ft 11 in)	USK Praha	(Czech Republic)
PF	10	Pelagia Papamichail	25 – 29 April 1986	1.89 m (6 ft 2 in)	COB Calais	(France)
PG	11	Thalia Kasapoglou	26 – 11 September 1984	1.72 m (5 ft 8 in)	Α.Ε.Ο. Proteas	(Greece)
F	12	Katerina Sotiriou	27 – 3 January 1984	1.85 m (6 ft 1 in)	Sony Athinaikos Athens	(Greece)
C	13	Emmanouela Androulaki	21 – 22 July 1989	1.89 m (6 ft 2 in)	Panionios	(Greece)
F	14	Anna Spyridopoulou	22 – 2 November 1988	1.84 m (6 ft 0 in)	Aris	(Greece)
F/C	15	Artemis Spanou	18 – 1 January 1993	1.90 m (6 ft 3 in)	Robert Morris Colonials	(United States)

Head coach

- (Greece) Konstantinos Missas

Legend

- (C) Team captain
- nat field describes country
  of last club
  before the tournament
- field is age on June 18, 2011

=== Latvia ===
Latvia Women's National Basketball Team roster
Players
Coaches

Pos.	No.	Name	Age – Date of birth	Height	Club
PG	4	Elina Babkina	22 – 24 April 1989	1.73 m (5 ft 8 in)	Lotos VBW Clima Gdynia	(Poland)
F	5	Sabine Niedola	20 – 29 April 1991	1.84 m (6 ft 0 in)	Nantes-Rezé	(France)
G	6	Zane Eglite	26 – 10 December 1984	1.68 m (5 ft 6 in)	Termocarispe La Spezia	(Italy)
C	7	Zane Tamane	27 – 24 September 1983	2.00 m (6 ft 7 in)	MKB Euroleasing Sopron	(Hungary)
G/F	8	Gunta Basko	31 – 27 April 1980	1.81 m (5 ft 11 in)	TS Wisła Can-Pack Kraków	(Poland)
F/C	9	Liene Jansone	30 – 22 May 1981	1.92 m (6 ft 4 in)	Pool Commense	(Italy)
G/F	10	Liene Priede	21 – 23 April 1990	1.76 m (5 ft 9 in)	Independence Pirates	(United States)
C	11	Aija Putnina	23 – 15 January 1988	1.92 m (6 ft 4 in)	ASPTT Arras	(France)
F	12	Karline Nimane	91 – 16 November 1919	1.87 m (6 ft 2 in)	TTT Riga	(Latvia)
PG	13	Kristine Karklina	27 – 30 September 1983	1.75 m (5 ft 9 in)	Sedis Bàsquet	(Spain)
C	14	Ieva Kublina	28 – 8 July 1982	1.93 m (6 ft 4 in)	SEAT Foton Gyõr	(Hungary)
F	15	Zane Jakobsone	25 – 30 November 1985	1.80 m (5 ft 11 in)	TTT Riga	(Latvia)

Head coach

- (Greece) George Dikeoulakos

Legend

- (C) Team captain
- nat field describes country
  of last club
  before the tournament
- field is age on June 18, 2011
