= Basketball at the 2016 Summer Olympics – Women's team rosters =

This article shows the rosters of all participating teams at the women's basketball tournament at the 2016 Summer Olympics in Rio de Janeiro.

== Group A ==
=== Australia ===
The following is the Australia roster in the women's basketball tournament of the 2016 Summer Olympics.

Australia women's national basketball team – 2016 Summer Olympics roster
Players
Coaches

Pos.	No.	Name	Age – Date of birth	Height	Club	Ctr.
PG	4	Tessa Lavey	23 – 29 March 1993	1.71 m (5 ft 7 in)	Perth Lynx	(Australia)
G	5	Leilani Mitchell	31 – 15 June 1985	1.65 m (5 ft 5 in)	Adelaide Lightning	(Australia)
SF	6	Stephanie Talbot	22 – 15 June 1994	1.86 m (6 ft 1 in)	Gorzów Wlkp.	(Poland)
G	7	Penny Taylor (C)	35 – 24 May 1981	1.85 m (6 ft 1 in)	Phoenix Mercury	(United States)
C	8	Liz Cambage	24 – 18 August 1991	2.03 m (6 ft 8 in)	Shanghai Boashan Dahua	(China)
F/C	9	Natalie Burton	27 – 23 March 1989	1.94 m (6 ft 4 in)	Perth Lynx	(Australia)
PF	10	Rachel Jarry	24 – 6 December 1991	1.86 m (6 ft 1 in)	Basket Lattes	(France)
F/C	11	Laura Hodges	32 – 13 December 1983	1.90 m (6 ft 3 in)	Adelaide Lightning	(Australia)
SG	12	Katie-Rae Ebzery	26 – 8 January 1990	1.78 m (5 ft 10 in)	Dynamo Moscow	(Russia)
G	13	Erin Phillips	31 – 19 May 1985	1.73 m (5 ft 8 in)	Dallas Wings	(United States)
C	14	Marianna Tolo	27 – 2 July 1989	1.96 m (6 ft 5 in)	Canberra Capitals	(Australia)
F	15	Cayla George	27 – 1 May 1989	1.94 m (6 ft 4 in)	UNIQA Sopron	(Hungary)

Head coach

- (Australia) Brendan Joyce

Assistant coach(es)

- (Australia) Scott Butler
- (Australia) Lori Chizik
- (Australia) Damian Cotter

Legend

- (C) Team captain
- Club – describes last
  club before the tournament
- Age – describes age
  on 6 August 2016

=== Belarus ===
The following is the Belarus roster for the women's basketball tournament of the 2016 Summer Olympics.

Belarus women's national basketball team – 2016 Summer Olympics roster
Players
Coaches

Pos.	No.	Name	Age – Date of birth	Height	Club	Ctr.
F	4	Maryia Papova	22 – 13 July 1994	1.89 m (6 ft 2 in)	Galatasaray	(Turkey)
PG	5	Aliaksandra Tarasava	28 – 23 June 1988	1.70 m (5 ft 7 in)	TSV 1880 Wasserburg	(Germany)
SF	6	Katsiaryna Snytsina	30 – 2 September 1985	1.88 m (6 ft 2 in)	Hatay BŞB	(Turkey)
SG	8	Tatsiana Likhtarovich	28 – 29 March 1988	1.80 m (5 ft 11 in)	Aluinvent DVTK	(Hungary)
PG	9	Volha Ziuzkova	33 – 14 June 1983	1.71 m (5 ft 7 in)	BK Tsmoki-Minsk	(Belarus)
C	10	Anastasiya Verameyenka	29 – 10 July 1987	1.92 m (6 ft 4 in)	Fenerbahçe	(Turkey)
C	11	Yelena Leuchanka	33 – 30 April 1983	1.95 m (6 ft 5 in)	Yakın Doğu	(Turkey)
G	12	Lindsey Harding	31 – 26 October 1984	1.73 m (5 ft 8 in)	New York Liberty	(United States)
F	13	Tatyana Troina	35 – 30 June 1981	1.88 m (6 ft 2 in)	Basket Gdynia	(Poland)
F	14	Nataliya Trafimava	37 – 16 June 1979	1.84 m (6 ft 0 in)	BK Gorizont Minsk	(Belarus)
PF	18	Maryia Filonchyk	24 – 10 January 1992	1.89 m (6 ft 2 in)	SBK Olimpia Grodno	(Belarus)
SG	41	Yuliya Rytsikava	29 – 8 September 1986	1.80 m (5 ft 11 in)	BK Gorizont Minsk	(Belarus)

Head coach

- (Belarus) Anatoli Buyalski

Assistant coach(es)

- (Belarus) Mikalai Buzliakou

Legend

- (C) Team captain
- Club – describes last
  club before the tournament
- Age – describes age
  on 6 August 2016

=== Brazil ===
The following is the Brazil roster for the women's basketball tournament of the 2016 Summer Olympics.

Brazil women's national basketball team – 2016 Summer Olympics roster
Players
Coaches

Pos.	No.	Name	Age – Date of birth	Height	Club	Ctr.
G	4	Adriana Moisés Pinto	37 – 6 December 1978	1.65 m (5 ft 5 in)	América Basquete	(Brazil)
G	5	Tainá Paixão	24 – 29 November 1991	1.73 m (5 ft 8 in)	América Basquete	(Brazil)
G	6	Joice Rodrigues	29 – 6 September 1986	1.76 m (5 ft 9 in)	Corinthians/Americana	(Brazil)
F	7	Palmira Marçal	32 – 20 May 1984	1.78 m (5 ft 10 in)	Sampaio Basquete	(Brazil)
G/F	8	Izi Castro Marques	34 – 13 March 1982	1.81 m (5 ft 11 in)	Sampaio Basquete	(Brazil)
F	9	Isabela Ramona	22 – 23 January 1994	1.79 m (5 ft 10 in)	Sampaio Basquete	(Brazil)
F	10	Tatiane Pacheco	25 – 16 October 1990	1.81 m (5 ft 11 in)	América Basquete	(Brazil)
C	11	Clarissa dos Santos	28 – 10 March 1988	1.84 m (6 ft 0 in)	Chicago Sky	(United States)
F	12	Damiris Dantas	23 – 17 November 1992	1.93 m (6 ft 4 in)	Corinthians/Americana	(Brazil)
C	13	Nádia Colhado	27 – 25 February 1989	1.93 m (6 ft 4 in)	Sampaio Basquete	(Brazil)
C	14	Érika de Souza	34 – 9 March 1982	1.96 m (6 ft 5 in)	Chicago Sky	(United States)
C	15	Kelly Santos	36 – 10 November 1979	1.93 m (6 ft 4 in)	América Basquete	(Brazil)

Head coach

- (Brazil) Antonio Carlos Barbosa

Assistant coach(es)

- (Brazil) Cristiano Cedra
- (Brazil) Júlio César Patrício

Legend

- Club – describes last
  club before the tournament
- Age – describes age
  on 6 August 2016

=== France ===
The following is the France roster for the women's basketball tournament of the 2016 Summer Olympics

France women's national basketball team – 2016 Summer Olympics roster
Players
Coaches

Pos.	No.	Name	Age – Date of birth	Height	Club
C	4	Isabelle Yacoubou (C)	30 – 21 April 1986	1.90 m (6 ft 3 in)	Familia Schio	(Italy)
C	5	Endéné Miyem	28 – 15 May 1988	1.88 m (6 ft 2 in)	Dynamo Kursk	(Russia)
C	7	Sandrine Gruda	29 – 25 June 1987	1.93 m (6 ft 4 in)	UMMC Ekaterinburg	(Russia)
F	10	Sarah Michel	27 – 10 January 1989	1.80 m (5 ft 11 in)	Basket Lattes	(France)
SF	11	Valériane Ayayi	22 – 29 April 1994	1.84 m (6 ft 0 in)	Basket Lattes	(France)
C	12	Gaëlle Skrela	33 – 24 January 1983	1.77 m (5 ft 10 in)	Basket Lattes	(France)
C	16	Héléna Ciak	26 – 15 December 1989	1.97 m (6 ft 6 in)	CJM Bourges Basket	(France)
G	17	Marine Johannès	21 – 21 January 1995	1.77 m (5 ft 10 in)	USO Mondeville	(France)
PG	20	Amel Bouderra	27 – 26 March 1989	1.63 m (5 ft 4 in)	Flammes Carolo Basket	(France)
F	21	Laetitia Kamba	29 – 10 January 1987	1.87 m (6 ft 2 in)	ESB Villeneuve-d'Ascq	(France)
G	22	Olivia Époupa	22 – 30 April 1994	1.64 m (5 ft 5 in)	Toulouse Métropole Basket	(France)
C	25	Marielle Amant	26 – 9 December 1989	1.90 m (6 ft 3 in)	ESB Villeneuve-d’Ascq	(France)

Head coach

- (France) Valérie Garnier

Assistant coach(es)

- (France) Grégory Halin
- (France) Olivier Lafargue

Legend

- (C) Team captain
- Club – describes last
  club before the tournament
- Age – describes age
  on 6 August 2016

=== Japan ===
The following is Japan's roster for the women's basketball tournament of the 2016 Summer Olympics.

Japan women's national basketball team – 2016 Summer Olympics roster
Players
Coaches

Pos.	No.	Name	Age – Date of birth	Height	Club	Ctr.
G	4	Kaede Kondo	24 – October 6, 1991	5 ft 8 in (1.73 m)	Toyota Antelopes	(Japan)
F	5	Yuki Miyazawa	23 – June 2, 1993	6 ft 0 in (1.83 m)	JX-Eneos Sunflowers	(Japan)
C	6	Yuka Mamiya	26 – April 3, 1990	6 ft 0 in (1.83 m)	JX-Eneos Sunflowers	(Japan)
F	7	Mika Kurihara	27 – May 14, 1989	5 ft 9 in (1.75 m)	Toyota Antelopes	(Japan)
F	8	Maki Takada	26 – August 23, 1989	6 ft 0 in (1.83 m)	Denso Iris	(Japan)
G	9	Naho Miyoshi	22 – December 21, 1993	5 ft 5 in (1.65 m)	Chanson V-Magic	(Japan)
F	10	Ramu Tokashiki	25 – June 11, 1991	6 ft 3 in (1.91 m)	Seattle Storm	(United States)
F	11	Moeko Nagaoka	22 – December 29, 1993	5 ft 11 in (1.8 m)	Fujitsu Red Wave	(Japan)
G	12	Asami Yoshida (C)	28 – October 9, 1987	5 ft 4 in (1.63 m)	JX-Eneos Sunflowers	(Japan)
G	13	Rui Machida	23 – March 8, 1993	5 ft 3 in (1.6 m)	Fujitsu Red Wave	(Japan)
G	14	Sanae Motokowa	24 – April 2, 1992	5 ft 9 in (1.75 m)	Chanson V-Magic	(Japan)
C	15	Asako O	28 – December 16, 1987	6 ft 2 in (1.88 m)	Mitsubishi Koalas	(Japan)

Head coach

- (Japan) Tomohide Utsumi

Assistant coach(es)

- (Japan) Eiki Umezaki

Legend

- (C) Team captain
- Club – describes last
  club before the tournament
- Age – describes age
  on 6 August 2016

=== Turkey ===
The following is the Turkey roster in the women's basketball tournament of the 2016 Summer Olympics.

Turkey women's national basketball team – 2016 Summer Olympics roster
Players
Coaches

Pos.	No.	Name	Age – Date of birth	Height	Club	Ctr.
PG	4	Olcay Çakır	23 – 13 July 1993	1.82 m (6 ft 0 in)	Fenerbahçe	(Turkey)
PF	5	Tuğçe Canıtez	25 – 10 November 1990	1.88 m (6 ft 2 in)	Fenerbahçe	(Turkey)
PG	7	Birsel Vardarlı	32 – 12 July 1984	1.75 m (5 ft 9 in)	Fenerbahçe	(Turkey)
C	8	Esra Ural	24 – 18 August 1991	1.98 m (6 ft 6 in)	Abdullah Gül	(Turkey)
PF	9	Bahar Çağlar	27 – 28 September 1988	1.90 m (6 ft 3 in)	Galatasaray	(Turkey)
PG	10	Işıl Alben	30 – 22 February 1986	1.72 m (5 ft 8 in)	Galatasaray	(Turkey)
C	11	Nevriye Yılmaz	36 – 16 June 1980	1.92 m (6 ft 4 in)	Galatasaray	(Turkey)
C	12	LaToya Sanders	29 – 11 September 1986	1.91 m (6 ft 3 in)	Abdullah Gül	(Turkey)
SG	13	Ayşe Cora	23 – 3 March 1993	1.75 m (5 ft 9 in)	Beşiktaş	(Turkey)
F	14	Şaziye İvegin	34 – 8 February 1982	1.80 m (5 ft 11 in)	Beşiktaş	(Turkey)
PF	15	Tilbe Şenyürek	21 – 26 April 1995	1.89 m (6 ft 2 in)	Botaşspor	(Turkey)
PF	33	Şebnem Kimyacıoğlu	33 – 14 June 1983	1.82 m (6 ft 0 in)	Yakın Doğu	(Turkey)

Head coach

- (Turkey) Ekrem Memnun

Assistant coach(es)

- (Turkey) Aziz Akkaya
- (Turkey) Murat Bilge

Legend

- (C) Team captain
- Club – describes last
  club before the tournament
- Age – describes age
  on 6 August 2016

== Group B ==
=== Canada ===
The following was the Canada roster in the women's basketball tournament of the 2016 Summer Olympics.

Canada women's national basketball team – 2016 Summer Olympics roster
Players
Coaches

Pos.	No.	Name	Age – Date of birth	Height	Club	Ctr.
G	4	Miah-Marie Langlois	24 – 21 September 1991	1.70 m (5 ft 7 in)	Dynamo Guvd Novosibirsk	(Russia)
G	5	Kia Nurse	20 – 22 February 1996	1.77 m (5 ft 10 in)	Connecticut Huskies	(United States)
G	6	Shona Thorburn	33 – 7 August 1982	1.75 m (5 ft 9 in)	Nantes Reze Basket	(France)
F	7	Nayo Raincock-Ekunwe	25 – 2 August 1991	1.87 m (6 ft 2 in)	Bendigo Spirit	(Australia)
G	8	Kim Gaucher	32 – 7 May 1984	1.80 m (5 ft 11 in)	Basket Lattes	(France)
F	9	Miranda Ayim	28 – 6 May 1988	1.87 m (6 ft 2 in)	Basket Landres	(France)
G	10	Nirra Fields	22 – 3 December 1993	1.70 m (5 ft 7 in)	Phoenix Mercury	(United States)
F	11	Natalie Achonwa	23 – 22 November 1992	1.90 m (6 ft 3 in)	Indiana Fever	(United States)
F	12	Lizanne Murphy	32 – 15 March 1984	1.82 m (6 ft 0 in)	UF Angers Basket	(France)
F	13	Tamara Tatham	30 – 19 August 1985	1.82 m (6 ft 0 in)	Dynamo Guvd Novosibirsk	(Russia)
F	14	Katherine Plouffe	23 – 15 September 1992	1.90 m (6 ft 3 in)	Nantes Reze Basket	(France)
F	15	Michelle Plouffe	23 – 15 September 1992	1.90 m (6 ft 3 in)	Basket Lattes	(France)

Head coach

- (Canada) Lisa Thomaidis

Assistant coach(es)

- (Canada) Shawnee Harle
- (Canada) Bev Smith

Legend

- (C) Team captain
- Club – describes last
  club before the tournament
- Age – describes age
  on 6 August 2016

=== China ===
The following is the China roster for the women's basketball tournament of the 2016 Summer Olympics.

China women's national basketball team – 2016 Summer Olympics roster
Players
Coaches

Pos.	No.	Name	Age – Date of birth	Height	Club	Ctr.
PG	4	Zhao Zhifang	21 – 11 August 1994	1.68 m (5 ft 6 in)	Tianjin University of Finance and Economics	(China)
SG	5	Chen Xiaojia	28 – 2 April 1988	1.82 m (6 ft 0 in)	Jiangsu Phoenix	(China)
PG	6	Li Shanshan	29 – 3 March 1987	1.78 m (5 ft 10 in)	Jiangsu Phoenix	(China)
G/F	7	Shao Ting	26 – 10 December 1989	1.84 m (6 ft 0 in)	Beijing Great Wall	(China)
SG	8	Wu Di	22 – 27 October 1993	1.82 m (6 ft 0 in)	Tianjin University of Finance and Economics	(China)
SF	9	Sun Mengxin	23 – 8 April 1993	1.90 m (6 ft 3 in)	Bayi Kylin	(China)
SF	10	Lu Wen (C)	26 – 26 February 1990	1.88 m (6 ft 2 in)	Bayi Kylin	(China)
PF	11	Huang Sijing	20 – 8 January 1996	1.90 m (6 ft 3 in)	Guangdong Dolphins	(China)
PF	12	Gao Song	24 – 16 April 1992	1.90 m (6 ft 3 in)	Beijing Great Wall	(China)
F/C	13	Sun Mengran	24 – 16 July 1992	1.95 m (6 ft 5 in)	Bayi Kylin	(China)
C	14	Huang Hongpin	27 – 23 April 1989	1.95 m (6 ft 5 in)	Shanxi Xingrui Flame	(China)
C	15	Chen Nan	33 – 8 January 1983	1.95 m (6 ft 5 in)	Bayi Kylin	(China)

Head coach

- (Australia) Tom Maher

Assistant coach(es)

- (Australia) Michele Timms
- (China) Xu Limin

Legend

- (C) Team captain
- Club – describes last
  club before the tournament
- Age – describes age
  on 6 August 2016

=== Senegal ===
The following is the Senegal roster for the women's basketball tournament of the 2016 Summer Olympics.

Senegal women's national basketball team – 2016 Summer Olympics roster
Players
Coaches

Pos.	No.	Name	Age – Date of birth	Height	Club	Ctr.
G	4	Oumoul Thiam	26 – 3 February 1990	1.79 m (5 ft 10 in)	C.D. Promete	(Spain)
G	5	Aya Traoré	33 – 27 July 1983	1.83 m (6 ft 0 in)	CB Conquero	(Spain)
PG	6	Bintou Diémé	32 – 1 February 1984	1.67 m (5 ft 6 in)	Tarbes Gespe Bigorre	(France)
PG	7	Fatou Dieng	32 – 18 August 1983	1.67 m (5 ft 6 in)	CB Al-Qázeres	(Spain)
F	8	Mame Diodio Diouf	31 – 15 December 1984	1.70 m (5 ft 7 in)	Reus Deportiu	(Spain)
C	9	Lala Wane	27 – 5 July 1989	1.79 m (5 ft 10 in)	Wasquehal Fémina	(France)
PF	10	Astou Traoré	35 – 30 April 1981	1.85 m (6 ft 1 in)	Saint-Amand	(France)
C	11	Maimouna Diarra	25 – 30 January 1991	1.98 m (6 ft 6 in)	Primeiro de Agosto	(Angola)
PF	12	Mame-Marie Sy	31 – 25 March 1985	1.85 m (6 ft 1 in)	ESB Villeneuve-d'Ascq	(France)
PF	13	Oumou Touré	28 – 18 February 1988	1.89 m (6 ft 2 in)	Toulouse	(France)
C	14	Marie-Sadio Rosche	28 – 10 August 1987	1.87 m (6 ft 2 in)	Avenir Basket Chartres	(France)
G	15	Aida Fall	29 – 11 October 1986	1.93 m (6 ft 4 in)	AL Le Havre	(France)

Head coach

- (Senegal) Mamadou Gaye

Assistant coach(es)

- (Senegal) Papa Courbary
- (Senegal) Elhadji Diop

Legend

- (C) Team captain
- Club – describes last
  club before the tournament
- Age – describes age
  on 6 August 2016

=== Serbia ===
The following is the Serbia roster in the women's basketball tournament of the 2016 Summer Olympics.

Serbia women's national basketball team – 2016 Summer Olympics roster
Players
Coaches

Pos.	No.	Name	Age – Date of birth	Height	Club
G	4	Tamara Radočaj	28 – 23 December 1987	1.70 m (5 ft 7 in)	UNI Győr	(Hungary)
F	5	Sonja Petrović	27 – 18 February 1989	1.89 m (6 ft 2 in)	Phoenix Mercury	(United States)
G	6	Saša Čađo	27 – 13 July 1989	1.78 m (5 ft 10 in)	İstanbul Üniversitesi SK	(Turkey)
C	7	Sara Krnjić	25 – 15 July 1991	1.93 m (6 ft 4 in)	UNIQA Sopron	(Hungary)
G	8	Nevena Jovanović	26 – 30 June 1990	1.79 m (5 ft 10 in)	PEAC-Pécs	(Hungary)
F	9	Jelena Milovanović	27 – 28 April 1989	1.90 m (6 ft 3 in)	Perfumerías Avenida	(Spain)
G	10	Dajana Butulija	30 – 23 February 1986	1.75 m (5 ft 9 in)	Lyon Basket	(France)
PF	11	Aleksandra Crvendakić	20 – 17 March 1996	1.87 m (6 ft 2 in)	UNIQA Sopron	(Hungary)
C	12	Dragana Stanković	21 – 18 January 1995	1.95 m (6 ft 5 in)	PEAC-Pécs	(Hungary)
G	13	Milica Dabović (C)	34 – 16 February 1982	1.70 m (5 ft 7 in)	Lyon Basket	(France)
G	14	Ana Dabović	26 – 18 August 1989	1.83 m (6 ft 0 in)	Los Angeles Sparks	(United States)
F	15	Danielle Page	29 – 14 November 1986	1.88 m (6 ft 2 in)	CJM Bourges Basket	(France)

Head coach

- (Serbia) Marina Maljković

Assistant coach(es)

- (Serbia) Bojan Janković
- (Serbia) Miloš Pađen
- (Serbia) Dragan Ratković

Legend

- (C) Team captain
- Club – describes last
  club before the tournament
- Age – describes age
  on 6 August 2016

=== Spain ===
The following is the Spain roster in the women's basketball tournament of the 2016 Summer Olympics.

Spain women's national basketball team – 2016 Summer Olympics roster
Players
Coaches

Pos.	No.	Name	Age – Date of birth	Height	Club	Ctr.
G	2	Leticia Romero	21 – 28 May 1995	1.74 m (5 ft 9 in)	Florida State Seminoles	(United States)
C	4	Laura Nicholls	27 – 26 February 1989	1.90 m (6 ft 3 in)	Wisla Krakow	(Poland)
G	6	Silvia Domínguez	29 – 31 January 1987	1.67 m (5 ft 6 in)	Perfumerías Avenida	(Spain)
F	7	Alba Torrens	26 – 30 August 1989	1.91 m (6 ft 3 in)	UMMC Ekaterinburg	(Russia)
G	9	Laia Palau	36 – 10 September 1979	1.81 m (5 ft 11 in)	ZVVZ USK Praha	(Czech Republic)
F	10	Marta Xargay	25 – 20 December 1990	1.80 m (5 ft 11 in)	ZVVZ USK Praha	(Czech Republic)
F	11	Leonor Rodríguez	24 – 21 October 1991	1.80 m (5 ft 11 in)	Perfumerías Avenida	(Spain)
C	13	Lucila Pascua	33 – 21 March 1983	1.96 m (6 ft 5 in)	Mann Filter	(Spain)
F	15	Anna Cruz	29 – 27 October 1986	1.79 m (5 ft 10 in)	Nadezhda Orenburg	(Russia)
F	19	Laura Quevedo	20 – 15 April 1996	1.82 m (6 ft 0 in)	Star Center Uni Ferrol	(Spain)
C	24	Laura Gil	24 – 24 April 1992	1.91 m (6 ft 3 in)	Cadí La Seu	(Spain)
C	45	Astou Ndour	21 – 22 August 1994	1.96 m (6 ft 5 in)	Perfumerías Avenida	(Spain)

Head coach

- (Spain) Lucas Mondelo

Assistant coach(es)

- (Spain) Víctor Lapeña
- (Spain) Isabel Sánchez

Legend

- Club – describes last
  club before the tournament
- Age – describes age
  on 6 August 2016

=== United States ===
The following was the United States roster for the women's basketball tournament of the 2016 Summer Olympics.

United States women's national basketball team – 2016 Summer Olympics roster
Players
Coaches

Pos.	No.	Name	Age – Date of birth	Height	Club	Ctr.
G	4	Lindsay Whalen	34 – May 9, 1982	5 ft 9 in (1.75 m)	Minnesota Lynx	(United States)
F	5	Seimone Augustus	32 – April 30, 1984	6 ft 0 in (1.83 m)	Minnesota Lynx	(United States)
G	6	Sue Bird	35 – October 16, 1980	5 ft 9 in (1.75 m)	Seattle Storm	(United States)
F	7	Maya Moore	27 – June 11, 1989	6 ft 0 in (1.83 m)	Minnesota Lynx	(United States)
F	8	Angel McCoughtry	29 – September 10, 1986	6 ft 1 in (1.85 m)	Atlanta Dream	(United States)
F/C	9	Breanna Stewart	21 – August 27, 1994	6 ft 4 in (1.93 m)	Seattle Storm	(United States)
F	10	Tamika Catchings	37 – July 21, 1979	6 ft 1 in (1.85 m)	Indiana Fever	(United States)
G/F	11	Elena Delle Donne	26 – September 5, 1989	6 ft 5 in (1.96 m)	Chicago Sky	(United States)
G	12	Diana Taurasi	34 – June 11, 1982	6 ft 0 in (1.83 m)	Phoenix Mercury	(United States)
C	13	Sylvia Fowles	30 – October 6, 1985	6 ft 6 in (1.98 m)	Minnesota Lynx	(United States)
C	14	Tina Charles	27 – December 5, 1988	6 ft 4 in (1.93 m)	New York Liberty	(United States)
C	15	Brittney Griner	25 – October 18, 1990	6 ft 8 in (2.03 m)	Phoenix Mercury	(United States)

Head coach

- Geno Auriemma

Assistant coach(es)

- Doug Bruno
- Cheryl Reeve
- Dawn Staley
- Jerry Colangelo (executive director)

Legend

- Club – describes last
  club before the tournament
- Age – describes age
  on August 6, 2016

== Statistics ==
=== Head coaches representation by country ===
Head Coaches in bold represent their own country.

No.	Country	Head coaches
2	Australia	**Brendan Joyce**, Tom Maher (China)
1	Belarus	**Anatoli Buyalski**
1	Canada	**Lisa Thomaidis**
1	Brazil	**Antonio Carlos Barbosa**
1	France	**Valérie Garnier**
1	Japan	**Tomohide Utsumi**
1	Senegal	**Mamadou Gaye**
1	Serbia	**Marina Maljković**
1	Spain	**Lucas Mondelo**
1	Turkey	**Ekrem Memnun**
1	United States	**Geno Auriemma**

== See also ==
- Basketball at the 2016 Summer Olympics – Men's team rosters
