= Basketball at the 2011 Summer Universiade – Women's tournament =

The women's tournament of basketball at the 2011 Summer Universiade in China began on August 14 and ended on August 21.

== Teams ==
| Americas | Asia | Europe | Oceania |
|---|---|---|---|
| Brazil; Canada; United States | China; Chinese Taipei; Japan | Czech Republic; Finland; Great Britain; Lithuania; Poland; Russia; Slovakia; Sweden | Australia |

== Preliminary round ==
=== Group A ===
| Team | Pld | W | L | PF | PA | PD | Pts. |
|---|---|---|---|---|---|---|---|
| Chinese Taipei | 3 | 3 | 0 | 226 | 163 | +63 | 6 |
| Finland | 3 | 2 | 1 | 156 | 184 | −28 | 5 |
| China | 3 | 1 | 2 | 181 | 178 | +3 | 4 |
| Lithuania | 3 | 0 | 3 | 173 | 211 | −38 | 3 |

August 14, 2011
18:00

Report

| China | 71–59 | Lithuania |
Scoring by quarter: 14–15, 17–16, 17–14, 23–14
| Pts: Shao T 24; Rebs: Gong Y 8 Asts: Zhai H 3 | | Pts: Mazionyte, Rickevičiūtė 10; Rebs: Taraseviciute 8 Asts: Sniokaite, Aglinskaite 1 |

Main Gymnasium of Universiade Center, Shenzhen
Referees: Tomasz Kudlicki (POL)

August 14, 2011
18:00

Report

| Chinese Taipei | 78–45 | Finland |
Scoring by quarter: 26–9, 17–9, 18–17, 17–10
| Pts: Huang P. 14; Rebs: Chen Y. 7 Asts: Huang P. 11 | | Pts: Gross 16; Rebs: Sten 13; Asts: Kesanen 2 |

Shenzhen Luohu Gymnasium, Shenzhen
Referees: Flavia Renata de Almeida (BRA)

August 15, 2011
18:00

Report

| Finland | 42–40 | China |
Scoring by quarter: 7–15, 7–12, 14–7, 14–6
| Pts: Sten 13; Rebs: Kesanen, Vapamaa, Gross 8 Asts: Kesanen 4 | | Pts: Shao T 12; Rebs: Shao T 10; Asts: five players 1 |

Main Gymnasium of Universiade Center, Shenzhen
Referees: Lauren Holtkamp Bass (USA)

August 15, 2011
18:00

Report

| Lithuania | 48–71 | Chinese Taipei |
Scoring by quarter: 17–22, 10–21, 5–15, 16–13
| Pts: Mazionyte 14; Rebs: Mazionyte 14; Asts: four players 1 | | Pts: Huang P. 17; Rebs: Chang N., Wu S., Huang P. 5 Asts: Huang F., Hsu C. 3 |

Shenzhen Luohu Gymnasium, Shenzhen
Referees: Robert Paulik (CZE)

August 16, 2011
20:30

Report

| China | 70–77 | Chinese Taipei |
Scoring by quarter: 12–26, 24–18, 14–14, 20–19
| Pts: Wu 19; Rebs: Shao 14; Asts: Zhai 3 | | Pts: Huang F. 19; Rebs: Chen Y. 8 Asts: Chen Y. 5 |

Main Gymnasium of Universiade Center, Shenzhen
Referees: Richard Ivan Stehlik (CAN)

August 16, 2011
20:30

Report

| Finland | 69–66 | Lithuania |
Scoring by quarter: 16–16, 11–8, 24–19, 18–23
| Pts: Lehtoranta 19; Rebs: Saarinen, Gross 8 Asts: Kesanen, Makitalo 2 | | Pts: Aglinskaite 17; Rebs: Sniokaite 5 Asts: Sniokaite 3 |

Shenzhen Luohu Gymnasium, Shenzhen
Referees: Kaili Lyn Kimura (USA)

=== Group B ===
| Team | Pld | W | L | PF | PA | PD | Pts. |
|---|---|---|---|---|---|---|---|
| United States | 3 | 3 | 0 | 311 | 154 | +157 | 6 |
| Brazil | 3 | 2 | 1 | 186 | 211 | −25 | 5 |
| Great Britain | 3 | 1 | 2 | 152 | 204 | −52 | 4 |
| Slovakia | 3 | 0 | 3 | 163 | 243 | −80 | 3 |

August 14, 2011
10:00

Report

| United States | 112–53 | Brazil |
Scoring by quarter: 25–6, 31–11, 28–23, 27–13
| Pts: Delle Donne 17; Rebs: Peters, Johnson 9 Asts: Diggins 5 | | Pts: Colhado 16; Rebs: Colhado 12; Asts: Santos, Paixao, Zabani 2 |

Main Gymnasium of Universiade Center, Shenzhen
Referees: Nadine Renée Crowley (CAN)

August 14, 2011
10:00

Report

| Great Britain | 64–51 | Slovakia |
Scoring by quarter: 8–16, 14–13, 23–13, 19–9
| Pts: Handy 25; Rebs: Allen 8 Asts: Anderson 2 | | Pts: Kmeťová 13; Rebs: Tetemondová 10; Asts: Tetemondová, Čarnoká, Baburová 2 |

Shenzhen Luohu Gymnasium, Shenzhen
Referees: Mindaugas Vecerskis (LTU)

August 15, 2011
10:00

Report

| Slovakia | 68–114 | United States |
Scoring by quarter: 20–30, 14–30, 19–25, 15–29
| Pts: Felixová 13; Rebs: Felixová 4 Asts: seven players 1 | | Pts: Diggins, Peters, Ogwumike 14; Rebs: Delle Donne 10; Asts: Sims 5 |

Main Gymnasium of Universiade Center, Shenzhen
Referees: Serkan Emlek (TUR)

August 15, 2011
12:30

Report

| Brazil | 68–55 | Great Britain |
Scoring by quarter: 15–16, 15–8, 21–16, 17–15
| Pts: Colhado 21; Rebs: Colhado, Carvalli 11; Asts: Carvalli, Lacerda 2 | | Pts: Handy 16; Rebs: Clark 8 Asts: Jones 4 |

Main Gymnasium of Universiade Center, Shenzhen
Referees: Omer Esteron (ISR)

August 16, 2011
15:30

Report

| Slovakia | 44–65 | Brazil |
Scoring by quarter: 12–14, 10–14, 15–21, 7–16
| Pts: Benuskova, Pindrochova 9 Rebs: Simova 5 Asts: Felixova, Kmetova 2 | | Pts: Zabani 13; Rebs: Colhado 14; Asts: Ribeiro 3 |

Main Gymnasium of Universiade Center, Shenzhen
Referees: Nadine Renée Crowley (CAN)

August 16, 2011
18:00

Report

| United States | 85–33 | Great Britain |
Scoring by quarter: 23–11, 30–6, 14–7, 18–9
| Pts: Diggins 13; Rebs: Johnson 8 Asts: Diggins 4 | | Pts: Oyefuwa 9 Rebs: Oyefuwa 8 Asts: Anderson 2 |

Main Gymnasium of Universiade Center, Shenzhen
Referees: Jurgis Lauranovicius (LTU)

=== Group C ===
| Team | Pld | W | L | PF | PA | PD | Pts. |
|---|---|---|---|---|---|---|---|
| Russia | 2 | 2 | 0 | 126 | 91 | +35 | 4 |
| Canada | 2 | 1 | 1 | 98 | 123 | −25 | 3 |
| Poland | 2 | 0 | 2 | 95 | 105 | −10 | 2 |

August 14, 2011
10:00

Report

| Poland | 50–52 | Canada |
Scoring by quarter: 15–15, 10–11, 10–12, 15–14
| Pts: Skobel 15; Rebs: Kotnis, Kaczmarczyk, Skobel 5 Asts: five players 1 | | Pts: Ross 13; Rebs: Ross 8 Asts: Colley, Miyazaki 3 |

Gymnasium of the Senior High Division of Shenzhen Foreign Languages School, Shenzhen
Referees: Boris Schmidt (GER)

August 15, 2011
10:00

Report

| Canada | 46–73 | Russia |
Scoring by quarter: 11–19, 8–15, 19–20, 8–19
| Pts: Ross 13; Rebs: Ross 7 Asts: Colley 2 | | Pts: Sumets 11; Rebs: Cherepanova 7 Asts: Logunova 3 |

Shenzhen Luohu Gymnasium, Shenzhen
Referees: Kaili Lyn Kimura (USA)

August 16, 2011
20:30

Report

| Russia | 53–45 | Poland |
Scoring by quarter: 14–7, 15–18, 8–11, 16–9
| Pts: Myasoedova 11; Rebs: Cherepanova 11; Asts: Cherepanova, Vieru 2 | | Pts: Trebicka, Skobel 11; Rebs: Skobel 6 Asts: no assists |

Gymnasium of Pingshan Sports Center, Shenzhen
Referees: Robert Paulik (CZE)

=== Group D ===
| Team | Pld | W | L | PF | PA | PD | Pts. |
|---|---|---|---|---|---|---|---|
| Australia | 3 | 3 | 0 | 269 | 179 | +90 | 6 |
| Sweden | 3 | 2 | 1 | 238 | 207 | +31 | 5 |
| Czech Republic | 3 | 1 | 2 | 228 | 243 | −17 | 4 |
| Japan | 3 | 0 | 3 | 212 | 318 | −106 | 3 |

August 14, 2011
18:00

Report

| Australia | 71–58 | Sweden |
Scoring by quarter: 15–15, 24–14, 20–14, 12–15
| Pts: Bishop, Penaluna 14; Rebs: Bishop, Penaluna 8 Asts: Hunt, Ebzery 4 | | Pts: F. Eldebrink 12; Rebs: F. Eldebrink 9 Asts: Halvarsson 2 |

Gymnasium of Pingshan Sports Center, Shenzhen
Referees: Rafael Ganiev (RUS)

August 14, 2011
18:00

Report

| Czech Republic | 97–86 | Japan |
Scoring by quarter: 16–20, 31–20, 26–24, 24–22
| Pts: Stepanova 34; Rebs: Stepanova 10; Asts: Elhotova 7 | | Pts: Sato 24; Rebs: Shinozaki 8 Asts: Sato, Iju, Shinozaki 1 |

Gymnasium of the Senior High Division of Shenzhen Foreign Languages School, Shenzhen
Referees: Lauren Holtkamp Bass (USA)

August 15, 2011
12:30

Report

| Japan | 53–113 | Australia |
Scoring by quarter: 12–31, 18–23, 11–25, 12–34
| Pts: Sato 21; Rebs: Sato 6 Asts: Abe 1 | | Pts: Tolo 22; Rebs: Francis 18; Asts: Ebzery, Francis 4 |

Shenzhen Luohu Gymnasium, Shenzhen
Referees: Sergey Krug (RUS)

August 15, 2011
12:30

Report

| Sweden | 72–63 | Czech Republic |
Scoring by quarter: 20–16, 21–19, 16–11, 15–17
| Pts: Abdi 17; Rebs: F Eldebrink 8 Asts: E Eldebrin, Abdi 2 | | Pts: Pecková 16; Rebs: Pecková 7 Asts: Bartonova 3 |

Gymnasium of Pingshan Sports Center, Shenzhen
Referees: Boris Schmidt (GER)

August 16, 2011
15:30

Report

| Japan | 73–108 | Sweden |
Scoring by quarter: 23–29, 13–28, 23–23, 14–28
| Pts: Sato 19; Rebs: Amano 6 Asts: Sato 5 | | Pts: Eldebrink 24; Rebs: Loyd 12; Asts: four players 3 |

Shenzhen Luohu Gymnasium, Shenzhen
Referees: Liu Wei (CHN)

August 16, 2011
18:00

Report

| Australia | 85–68 | Czech Republic |
Scoring by quarter: 25–17, 26–16, 10–20, 24–15
| Pts: Bishop 25; Rebs: Bishop 9 Asts: Hunt 7 | | Pts: Hejdova 19; Rebs: Hejdova 11; Asts: Elhotova 3 |

Shenzhen Luohu Gymnasium, Shenzhen
Referees: Lauren Holtkamp Bass (USA)

== Quarterfinal round ==
=== Classification 9th–15th place ===
August 18, 2011
10:00

Report

| China | 75–73 | Slovakia |
Scoring by quarter: 16–14, 21–17, 18–16, 20–6
| Pts: Wang 27; Rebs: Shao 10; Asts: Zhai 4 | | Pts: Tetemondová 13; Rebs: Tetemondová 9 Asts: Černáková, Baburová 2 |

Main Gymnasium of Universiade Center, Shenzhen
Referees: Rafael Ganiev (RUS)

August 18, 2011
10:00

Report

| Great Britain | 69–79 | Lithuania |
Scoring by quarter: 12–23, 14–14, 14–22, 29–20
| Pts: Handy 16; Rebs: Buchan 7 Asts: Thomas-Johnson, Jones, Handy 2 | | Pts: Aglinskaite 21; Rebs: Mazionyte, Aglinskaite, Galdikaite 5 Asts: Sniokaite 6 |

Shenzhen Luohu Gymnasium, Shenzhen
Referees: Flavia Renata de Almeida (BRA)

August 18, 2011
10:00

Report

| Poland | 66–73 | Japan |
Scoring by quarter: 22–15, 11–22, 13–19, 20–17
| Pts: Kaczmarczyk 23; Rebs: Kaczmarczyk 16; Asts: Pietrzak 4 | | Pts: Shinozaki 19; Rebs: Shinozaki 8 Asts: five players 2 |

Gymnasium of Pingshan Sports Center, Shenzhen
Referees: Nadine Renée Crowley (CAN)

=== Quarterfinals ===
August 18, 2011
20:30

Report

| Chinese Taipei | 65–54 | Brazil |
Scoring by quarter: 19–10, 8–8, 20–13, 18–23
| Pts: Huang PJ 21; Rebs: Chen YC 8 Asts: Huang PJ 5 | | Pts: Colhado 24; Rebs: Colhado 16; Asts: Carvalli 4 |

Main Gymnasium of Universiade Center, Shenzhen
Referees: Timothy Andrew Brown (NZL)

August 18, 2011
20:30

Report

| United States | 96–30 | Finland |
Scoring by quarter: 32–10, 21–7, 20–7, 23–6
| Pts: Peters, Delle Donne 17; Rebs: Johnson 9 Asts: Diggins 7 | | Pts: Vapamaa 6 Rebs: Sten 6 Asts: no assists |

Shenzhen Luohu Gymnasium, Shenzhen
Referees: Mindaugas Vecerskis (LTU)

August 18, 2011
20:30

Report

| Russia | 60–68 | Sweden |
Scoring by quarter: 10–14, 10–15, 23–18, 17–21
| Pts: Petrushina 13; Rebs: Cherepanova 9 Asts: Khrustaleba 3 | | Pts: F. Eldebrink 22; Rebs: F. Eldebrink, Halvarsson 8 Asts: Halvarsson 2 |

Gymnasium of Pingshan Sports Center, Shenzhen
Referees: Liu Wei (CHN)

August 18, 2011
20:30

Report

| Australia | 79–44 | Canada |
Scoring by quarter: 25–14, 16–16, 27–9, 11–5
| Pts: Madgen, Francis 14; Rebs: Tolo 12; Asts: Hunt 5 | | Pts: Ross 15; Rebs: Ross 8 Asts: Langlois 2 |

Gymnasium of the Senior High Division of Shenzhen Foreign Languages School, Shenzhen
Referees: Robert Vyklicky (CZE)

== Semifinal round ==
=== Classification 13th–15th place ===
August 19, 2011
10:00

Report

| Slovakia | 53–45 | Poland |
Scoring by quarter: 14–10, 14–9, 13–12, 12–14
| Pts: Kmetova 11; Rebs: Tetemondová 11; Asts: Pindrochnova, Kmetova 1 | | Pts: Skobel 17; Rebs: Antczak 6 Asts: Durak 3 |

Main Gymnasium of Universiade Center, Shenzhen
Referees: Liu Wei (CHN)

=== Classification 9th–12th place ===
August 19, 2011
10:00

Report

| China | 57–55 | Japan |
Scoring by quarter: 15–12, 16–12, 18–14, 8–17
| Pts: Wang 25; Rebs: Guo 12; Asts: four players 2 | | Pts: Shinozaki 18; Rebs: Amano 7 Asts: four players 2 |

Shenzhen Luohu Gymnasium, Shenzhen
Referees: Petri Mäntylä (FIN),

August 19, 2011
12:30

Report

| Lithuania | 59–82 | Czech Republic |
Scoring by quarter: 10–25, 12–16, 18–17, 19–24
| Pts: Aglinskaite 12; Rebs: Mazionyte 7 Asts: Sniokaite 2 | | Pts: Pecková 27; Rebs: Stepanova 6 Asts: Bartakova 4 |

Shenzhen Luohu Gymnasium, Shenzhen
Referees: Scott Paul Beker (AUS)

=== Classification 5th–8th place ===
August 19, 2011
18:00

Report

| Brazil | 58–65 | Russia |
Scoring by quarter: 14–16, 10–7, 9–23, 25–19
| Pts: Colhado 15; Rebs: Colhado 14; Asts: Colhado, Costa 2 | | Pts: Cherepanova 18; Rebs: Petrushina, Myasoedova 10; Asts: Vieru, Myasoedova 2 |

Shenzhen Luohu Gymnasium, Shenzhen
Referees: Serkan Emlek (TUR)

August 19, 2011
20:30

Report

| Finland | 66–71 | Canada |
Scoring by quarter: 25–16, 10–26, 18–10, 13–19
| Pts: Vapamaa 19; Rebs: Gross 8 Asts: Salomaa, Sten 3 | | Pts: Ross 17; Rebs: Ross 11; Asts: Colley, Ross, Raincock 2 |

Shenzhen Luohu Gymnasium, Shenzhen
Referees: Lauren Holtkamp Bass (USA)

=== Semifinals ===
August 19, 2011
18:00

Report

| Chinese Taipei | 71–70 (OT) | Sweden |
Scoring by quarter: 13–23, 17–4, 24–19, 10–18, Overtime: 7–6
| Pts: Chen YC 22; Rebs: Huang YL 8 Asts: Huang PJ 5 | | Pts: Halvarsson 20; Rebs: F. Eldebrink, Loyd 11; Asts: F. Eldebrink, Loyd 3 |

Main Gymnasium of Universiade Center, Shenzhen
Referees: Milija Vojinovic (SRB)

August 19, 2011
20:30

Report

| United States | 79–67 | Australia |
Scoring by quarter: 20–17, 11–10, 22–19, 26–21
| Pts: Delle Donne 22; Rebs: Delle Donne 11; Asts: Diggins 4 | | Pts: Hunt 18; Rebs: Francis 14; Asts: Hunt 3 |

Main Gymnasium of Universiade Center, Shenzhen
Referees: Boris Schmidt (GER)

== Final round ==
=== 13th-place match ===
August 21, 2011
10:00

Report

| Slovakia | 69–56 | Great Britain |
Scoring by quarter: 12–16, 17–11, 15–13, 25–16
| Pts: Tetemondová 17; Rebs: Tetemondová 14; Asts: Pindrochnova 3 | | Pts: Thomas-Johnson, Barroilhet 11; Rebs: Handy 10; Asts: Handy 2 |

Gymnasium of Pingshan Sports Center, Shenzhen
Referees: Hu Ji (CHN)

=== 11th-place match ===
August 21, 2011
10:00

Report

| Japan | 66–80 | Lithuania |
Scoring by quarter: 12–25, 14–13, 12–20, 27–22
| Pts: Shinozaki 16; Rebs: Amano 5 Asts: Shinozaki 4 | | Pts: Mazionyte 16; Rebs: Mazionyte 12; Asts: Mazionyte, Rickevičiūtė 4 |

Shenzhen Luohu Gymnasium, Shenzhen
Referees: Robert Vyklicky (CZE)

=== 9th-place match ===
August 21, 2011
12:30

Report

| China | 68–93 | Czech Republic |
Scoring by quarter: 26–23, 14–23, 5–18, 23–29
| Pts: Shao Ting 21; Rebs: Shao Ting 11; Asts: Shao Ting 4 | | Pts: Stepanova 26; Rebs: Stepanova 11; Asts: Elhotova 3 |

Gymnasium of Pingshan Sports Center, Shenzhen
Referees: Shigeyuki Arisawa (JPN)

=== 7th-place match ===
August 22, 2011
12:30

Report

| Brazil | 62–47 | Finland |
Scoring by quarter: 14–10, 16–8, 22–8, 10–21
| Pts: Colhado 21; Rebs: Colhado 11; Asts: Colhado, Carvalli 3 | | Pts: Gross 17; Rebs: Gross 11; Asts: four players 2 |

Shenzhen Luohu Gymnasium, Shenzhen
Referees: Carlos Mateus (FRA)

=== 5th-place match ===
August 21, 2011
10:00

Report

| Russia | 71–52 | Canada |
Scoring by quarter: 20–14, 14–6, 22–16, 15–16
| Pts: Khrustaleba, Cherepanova, Paskalenko 12; Rebs: Paskalenko 10; Asts: Cherepanova 3 | | Pts: Ross 17; Rebs: Ross 7 Asts: Langlois, Colley, Pinske 3 |

Main Gymnasium of Universiade Center, Shenzhen
Referees: Kaili Lyn Limura (USA)

=== Bronze-medal match ===
August 21, 2011
19:00

Report

| Sweden | 56–66 | Australia |
Scoring by quarter: 13–14, 16–14, 14–8, 13–30
| Pts: Halvarsson 20; Rebs: E Eldebrink 6 Asts: F Eldebrinkk, Loyd 1 | | Pts: Bishop 21; Rebs: Tolo 8 Asts: Cumming 3 |

Main Gymnasium of Universiade Center, Shenzhen
Referees: Lauren Holtkamp Bass (USA)

=== Gold-medal match ===
August 21, 2011
21:30

Report

| Chinese Taipei | 66–101 | United States |
Scoring by quarter: 21–29, 17–26, 16–20, 12–26
| Pts: Chen YC 21; Rebs: Huang PJ 4 Asts: Huang FS 4 | | Pts: N Ogwumike 24; Rebs: Delle Donne 11; Asts: Diggins 6 |

Main Gymnasium of Universiade Center, Shenzhen
Referees: Nadine Renée Crowley (CAN)

== Final standings ==
| Place | Team | Score |
|---|---|---|
| 1st place, gold medalist(s) | United States | 6–0 |
| 2nd place, silver medalist(s) | Chinese Taipei | 5–1 |
| 3rd place, bronze medalist(s) | Australia | 5–1 |
| 4 | Sweden | 3–3 |
| 5 | Russia | 4–1 |
| 6 | Canada | 2–3 |
| 7 | Brazil | 3–3 |
| 8 | Finland | 2–4 |
| 9 | Czech Republic | 3–2 |
| 10 | China | 3–3 |
| 11 | Lithuania | 2–4 |
| 12 | Japan | 1–5 |
| 13 | Slovakia | 2–4 |
| 14 | Great Britain | 1–4 |
| 15 | Poland | 0–4 |
