= Mikulášiková =

Mikulášiková is a Slovak surname. Notable people with the surname include:

- Rebeka Mikulášiková (born 1999), Slovak basketball player
- Viera Mikulášiková (born 1981), Slovak Paralympic swimmer
