= Czubak =

Czubak is a Polish surname of several possible origins: from nicknames: a bird czubak, waxwing, or a person with a prominent chub or czupryna, or a patronymic surname derived from the given name/nickname Chub or Chuba. Archaic feminine forms: Chubakowa (by husband), Czubakówna (by father); currently these are used colloquially. Ukrainian equivalent: Chubak. Notable people with the surname include:

- Dawid Czubak (born 1998), Polish road and track cyclist
- Genowefa Czubak (1904–1982), Polish nun, Righteous Among the Nations
- Karol Czubak (born 2000), Polish footballer
- Katarzyna Czubak (born 1985), Polish basketball player
- Krystyna Czubak (born 1933), Polish craftsman and political activist, member of the Sejm
- Patryk Czubak (born 1993), Polish football manager and player
- Tomasz Czubak (born 1973), Polish 400 metres runner
