= Małgorzata Babicka =

Polish basketball player (born 1985)

Personal information
- Born: 6 September 1985 (age 41) Jelenia Góra, Poland
- Listed height: 1.87 m (6 ft 2 in)
- Position: Small forward / power forward

Career history
- 2007-2008: AZS Gorzów
- 2008-2009: Jelenia Gora
- 2009: Juventus Basket Pontedera
- 2009-2011: Orzel Polkowice
- 2011: KS Cukierki Odra Brzeg
- 2011-2012: Cavigal Nice Basket
- 2012-2013: St. Etienne

Małgorzata Babicka (born 6 September 1985) is a former Polish female professional basketball player.
