= Gülşah Akkaya =

Turkish basketball player

Personal information
- Born: October 6, 1977 (age 49) Bornova, İzmir, Turkey
- Listed height: 1.81 m (5 ft 11 in)
- Listed weight: 67 kg (148 lb)

Career information
- College: Lynn University (1997–1999)
- Playing career: 1995–2017
- Position: Forward

Career history
- 1995–96: (Turkey) Fenerbahçe
- 1997–99: (United States) Lynn University
- 1999–00: (Turkey) Fenerbahçe
- 2002–03: (Greece) Panserraikos
- 2003: (Israel) YES Ramat HaSharon
- 2003: (Turkey) Erdemirspor
- 2005–06: (Turkey) Beşiktaş
- 2006–07: (Turkey) Mersin B.B.
- 2007–08: (Turkey) Galatasaray
- 2008–09: (Spain) El Cadi La Seu D'Urgell
- 2009–11: (Turkey) Samsun B.K.
- 2011–12: (Turkey) TED Ankara Kolejliler
- 2012: (Turkey) Canik
- 2013: (Turkey) Beşiktaş

Gülşah Akkaya (born October 6, 1977) is a former Turkish professional woman basketball player in forward position. The 1.81 m (5' 11½") tall national player has been a top scorer in the Turkish Women's Basketball League.

Akkaya started playing basketball at the age of 13. She debuted in Deniz Nakliyat and then transferred to Fenerbahçe İstanbul where she played in the 1995–96 season. In 1997, she moved to the US and played in the American NCAA with the Lynn University team in two seasons until 1999. She still ranks 4th with an average of 23.8 points in the all-time list of single season points per season for her time at Boca Raton, Florida.

After Akkaya returned home, she was with Fenerbahçe İstanbul in the 1999–00 season. She transferred to the Greek club Panserraikos in Thessaloniki for the 2002–03 season and became top scorer with 204 points. In 2003, Akkaya played in YES Ramat HaSharon club in Ramat HaSharon, Israel. She helped her team win the championship by scoring a basket at the latest second. Returning to Turkey in 2003, Akkaya played for Erdemirspor in Zonguldak.

Akkaya was part of the gold medal-winning Turkish national team at the 2005 Mediterranean Games in Almería, Spain.

She was top scorer in Turkish Women's Basketball League with her average of 22.0 points in 25 games in the 2004–05 season.

She played for Beşiktaş for the 2005–06 season, helping the team to the league finals. For the 2006–2007 season, she returned to Mersin B.B. sports club and played with an average of 17.0 points per game and helped Mersin to play in playoffs. She also played for Galatasaray in the 2007–08 season.

She was a member of Spanish club El Cadi La Seu D'Urgell for the 2008–09 season. She played for Samsun B.K. from 2009 till 2011.

Akkaya played in the national team that won the silver medal at the EuroBasket Women 2011 championship held in Poland.

During the 2011–12 season, Gülşah played for TED Ankara Kolejliler. By the start of the season 2012–13, she was transferred to Canik, after playing half of the season with Canik, Gülşah returned to Beşiktaş in January 2013, and played with 12.4 points and 4.3 rebounds for the rest of the season.

== Honors ==
=== Individual ===
- Turkish Women's Basketball League 2004-05 Top Scorer

=== National team ===
- 2005 Mediterranean Games (gold)
- EuroBasket Women 2011 (silver)

== See also ==
- Turkish women in sports
