= Basketball at the 2016 Summer Olympics – Men's team rosters =

This article shows the rosters of all participating teams at the men's basketball tournament at the 2016 Summer Olympics in Rio de Janeiro.

== Group A ==
=== Australia ===
The following is the Australia roster in the men's basketball tournament of the 2016 Summer Olympics.

Australia men's national basketball team – 2016 Summer Olympics roster
Players
Coaches

Pos.	No.	Name	Age – Date of birth	Height	Club	Ctr.
SG	4	Chris Goulding	27 – 24 October 1988	1.92 m (6 ft 4 in)	Melbourne United	(Australia)
PG	5	Patty Mills	27 – 11 August 1988	1.83 m (6 ft 0 in)	San Antonio Spurs	(United States)
C	6	Andrew Bogut	31 – 28 November 1984	2.06 m (6 ft 9 in)	Dallas Mavericks	(United States)
SF	7	Joe Ingles	28 – 2 October 1987	2.03 m (6 ft 8 in)	Utah Jazz	(United States)
G	8	Matthew Dellavedova	25 – 8 September 1990	1.93 m (6 ft 4 in)	Milwaukee Bucks	(United States)
G/F	9	Ryan Broekhoff	25 – 23 August 1990	2.01 m (6 ft 7 in)	Lokomotiv-Kuban	(Russia)
F/C	10	Cameron Bairstow	25 – 7 December 1990	2.06 m (6 ft 9 in)	Brisbane Bullets	(Australia)
G	11	Kevin Lisch	30 – 16 May 1986	1.88 m (6 ft 2 in)	Sydney Kings	(Australia)
C	12	Aron Baynes	29 – 9 December 1986	2.08 m (6 ft 10 in)	Boston Celtics	(United States)
F/C	13	David Andersen (C)	36 – 23 June 1980	2.11 m (6 ft 11 in)	ASVEL Basket	(France)
PF	14	Brock Motum	25 – 16 October 1990	2.08 m (6 ft 10 in)	Žalgiris Kaunas	(Lithuania)
PG	15	Damian Martin	31 – 5 September 1984	1.86 m (6 ft 1 in)	Perth Wildcats	(Australia)

Head coach

- (Australia) Andrej Lemanis

Assistant coach(es)

- (Australia) Trevor Gleeson
- (Australia) Luc Longley
- (Australia) Will Weaver
- (Australia) Dr. Adrian Hurley
- (Australia) Mick Downer

Legend

- (C) Team captain
- Club – describes last
  club before the tournament
- Age – describes age
  on 6 August 2016

=== China ===
The following is the China roster for the men's basketball tournament of the 2016 Summer Olympics.

China men's national basketball team – 2016 Summer Olympics roster
Players
Coaches

Pos.	No.	Name	Age – Date of birth	Height	Club	Ctr.
PG	4	Zhao Jiwei	20 – 25 August 1995	1.85 m (6 ft 1 in)	Liaoning Flying Leopards	(China)
G	5	Sui Ran	24 – 25 June 1992	1.94 m (6 ft 4 in)	Shandong Golden Stars	(China)
G	6	Guo Ailun	22 – 14 November 1993	1.92 m (6 ft 4 in)	Liaoning Flying Leopards	(China)
SF	8	Ding Yanyuhang	22 – 20 August 1993	2.00 m (6 ft 7 in)	Shandong Golden Stars	(China)
SF	9	Zhai Xiaochuan	23 – 24 March 1993	2.05 m (6 ft 9 in)	Beijing Ducks	(China)
G/F	10	Zhou Peng (C)	26 – 11 October 1989	2.06 m (6 ft 9 in)	Guangdong Southern Tigers	(China)
PF	11	Yi Jianlian	31 – 27 October 1984	2.13 m (7 ft 0 in)	Guangdong Southern Tigers	(China)
G/F	12	Li Gen	28 – 27 October 1987	1.96 m (6 ft 5 in)	Xinjiang Flying Tigers	(China)
C	13	Li Muhao	24 – 2 June 1992	2.18 m (7 ft 2 in)	Shenzhen Leopards	(China)
F/C	14	Zou Yuchen	20 – 5 July 1996	2.08 m (6 ft 10 in)	Bayi Rockets	(China)
F/C	15	Zhou Qi	20 – 16 January 1996	2.16 m (7 ft 1 in)	Xinjiang Flying Tigers	(China)
F/C	31	Wang Zhelin	22 – 20 January 1994	2.14 m (7 ft 0 in)	Fujian Sturgeons	(China)

Head coach

- (China) Gong Luming

Assistant coach(es)

- (China) Li Nan
- (China) Hu Xuefeng
- (China) Wu Qinglong
- (China) Cui Wanjun
- (Greece) Giannis Christopoulos

Legend

- (C) Team captain
- Club – describes last
  club before the tournament
- Age – describes age
  on 6 August 2016

=== France ===
The following is the France roster in the men's basketball tournament of the 2016 Summer Olympics.

France men's national basketball team – 2016 Summer Olympics roster
Players
Coaches

Pos.	No.	Name	Age – Date of birth	Height	Club	Ctr.
PG	4	Thomas Heurtel	27 – 10 April 1989	1.88 m (6 ft 2 in)	Anadolu Efes S.K.	(Turkey)
SF	5	Nicolas Batum	27 – 14 December 1988	2.03 m (6 ft 8 in)	Charlotte Hornets	(United States)
G	6	Antoine Diot	27 – 17 January 1989	1.93 m (6 ft 4 in)	Valencia BC	(Spain)
F/C	7	Joffrey Lauvergne	24 – 30 September 1991	2.09 m (6 ft 10 in)	Denver Nuggets	(United States)
SF	8	Charles Lombahe-Kahudi	30 – 19 July 1986	1.97 m (6 ft 6 in)	ASVEL Basket	(France)
PG	9	Tony Parker	34 – 17 May 1982	1.86 m (6 ft 1 in)	San Antonio Spurs	(United States)
PF	11	Florent Piétrus	35 – 19 January 1981	2.01 m (6 ft 7 in)	SLUC Nancy	(France)
G	12	Nando de Colo	29 – 23 June 1987	1.96 m (6 ft 5 in)	CSKA Moscow	(Russia)
PF	13	Boris Diaw	34 – 16 April 1982	2.03 m (6 ft 8 in)	Utah Jazz	(United States)
SF	15	Mickaël Gelabale	33 – 22 May 1983	2.01 m (6 ft 7 in)	Le Mans Sarthe	(France)
C	16	Rudy Gobert	24 – 26 June 1992	2.16 m (7 ft 1 in)	Utah Jazz	(United States)
C	17	Kim Tillie	28 – 15 July 1988	2.11 m (6 ft 11 in)	Saski Baskonia	(Spain)

Head coach

- (France) Vincent Collet

Assistant coach(es)

- (France) Jacques Commères
- (France) Ruddy Nelhomme

Legend

- Club – describes last
  club before the tournament
- Age – describes age
  on 6 August 2016

=== Serbia ===
The following is the Serbia roster in the men's basketball tournament of the 2016 Summer Olympics

Serbia men's national basketball team – 2016 Summer Olympics roster
Players
Coaches

Pos.	No.	Name	Age – Date of birth	Height	Club	Ctr.
PG	4	Miloš Teodosić (C)	29 – March 19, 1987	1.95 m (6 ft 5 in)	CSKA Moscow	(Russia)
SF	5	Marko Simonović	30 – May 30, 1986	2.01 m (6 ft 7 in)	Crvena Zvezda	(Serbia)
SG	7	Bogdan Bogdanović	23 – August 18, 1992	1.98 m (6 ft 6 in)	Fenerbahce	(Turkey)
PG	9	Stefan Marković	28 – April 25, 1988	1.95 m (6 ft 5 in)	Baloncesto Málaga	(Spain)
SF	10	Nikola Kalinić	24 – November 8, 1991	2.02 m (6 ft 8 in)	Fenerbahce	(Turkey)
G	11	Nemanja Nedović	25 – June 16, 1991	1.92 m (6 ft 4 in)	Baloncesto Málaga	(Spain)
PF	12	Stefan Birčević	26 – December 13, 1989	2.10 m (6 ft 11 in)	Estudiantes	(Spain)
C	13	Miroslav Raduljica	28 – January 5, 1988	2.13 m (7 ft 0 in)	Panathinaikos	(Greece)
C	14	Nikola Jokić	21 – February 19, 1995	2.08 m (6 ft 10 in)	Denver Nuggets	(United States)
C	15	Vladimir Štimac	28 – September 25, 1987	2.11 m (6 ft 11 in)	Crvena Zvezda	(Serbia)
PG	24	Stefan Jović	25 – November 3, 1990	1.98 m (6 ft 6 in)	Crvena Zvezda	(Serbia)
PF	25	Milan Mačvan	26 – November 16, 1989	2.06 m (6 ft 9 in)	Emporio Armani	(Italy)

Head coach

- (Serbia) Aleksandar Đorđević

Assistant coach(es)

- (Serbia) Miroslav Nikolić
- (Serbia) Jovica Antonić
- (Serbia) Milan Minić

Conditioning trainer

- (Serbia) Mladen Mihajlović

Legend

- (C) Team captain
- Club – describes last
  club before the tournament
- Age – describes age
  on 6 August 2016

=== United States ===
The following is the United States roster in the men's basketball tournament of the 2016 Summer Olympics.

United States men's national basketball team – 2016 Summer Olympics roster
Players
Coaches

Pos.	No.	Name	Age – Date of birth	Height	Club	Ctr.
G	4	Jimmy Butler	26 – September 14, 1989	6 ft 7 in (2.01 m)	Chicago Bulls	(United States)
F	5	Kevin Durant	27 – September 29, 1988	6 ft 10 in (2.08 m)	Golden State Warriors	(United States)
C	6	DeAndre Jordan	28 – July 21, 1988	6 ft 11 in (2.11 m)	Los Angeles Clippers	(United States)
G	7	Kyle Lowry	30 – March 25, 1986	6 ft 0 in (1.83 m)	Toronto Raptors	(Canada)
F	8	Harrison Barnes	24 – May 30, 1992	6 ft 8 in (2.03 m)	Dallas Mavericks	(United States)
G	9	DeMar DeRozan	26 – August 7, 1989	6 ft 7 in (2.01 m)	Toronto Raptors	(Canada)
G	10	Kyrie Irving	24 – March 23, 1992	6 ft 3 in (1.91 m)	Cleveland Cavaliers	(United States)
G	11	Klay Thompson	26 – February 8, 1990	6 ft 7 in (2.01 m)	Golden State Warriors	(United States)
C	12	DeMarcus Cousins	25 – August 13, 1990	6 ft 10 in (2.08 m)	Sacramento Kings	(United States)
F	13	Paul George	26 – May 2, 1990	6 ft 9 in (2.06 m)	Indiana Pacers	(United States)
F	14	Draymond Green	26 – March 4, 1990	6 ft 6 in (1.98 m)	Golden State Warriors	(United States)
F	15	Carmelo Anthony	32 – May 29, 1984	6 ft 7 in (2.01 m)	New York Knicks	(United States)

Head coach

- Mike Krzyzewski

Assistant coach(es)

- Jim Boeheim
- Tom Thibodeau
- Monty Williams
- Jerry Colangelo (executive director)

Legend

- Club – describes last
  club before the tournament
- Age – describes age
  on August 6, 2016

=== Venezuela ===
The following is the Venezuela roster for the men's basketball tournament of the 2016 Summer Olympics.

Venezuela men's national basketball team – 2016 Summer Olympics roster
Players
Coaches

Pos.	No.	Name	Age – Date of birth	Height	Club	Ctr.
C	0	Gregory Echenique	25 – 23 November 1990	2.06 m (6 ft 9 in)	Guaros de Lara	(Venezuela)
G/F	2	Dwight Lewis	28 – 7 October 1987	1.97 m (6 ft 6 in)	Trotamundos de Carabobo	(Venezuela)
C	4	Miguel Marriaga	32 – 6 June 1984	2.06 m (6 ft 9 in)	Toros de Aragua	(Venezuela)
PG	5	Gregory Vargas	30 – 18 February 1986	1.80 m (5 ft 11 in)	Maccabi Haifa	(Israel)
SG	6	John Cox	35 – 7 June 1981	1.94 m (6 ft 4 in)	Bucaneros de La Guaira	(Venezuela)
PG	8	David Cubillán	29 – 27 July 1987	1.81 m (5 ft 11 in)	Trotamundos de Carabobo	(Venezuela)
G/F	10	José Vargas (C)	34 – 23 January 1982	1.95 m (6 ft 5 in)	Marinos de Anzoátegui	(Venezuela)
PF	14	Miguel Ruiz	25 – 20 December 1990	2.02 m (6 ft 8 in)	Trotamundos de Carabobo	(Venezuela)
F/C	15	Windi Graterol	29 – 10 September 1986	2.04 m (6 ft 8 in)	Guaros de Lara	(Venezuela)
PG	19	Heissler Guillént	29 – 17 December 1986	1.86 m (6 ft 1 in)	Guaros de Lara	(Venezuela)
F	23	Anthony Pérez	22 – 29 September 1993	2.05 m (6 ft 9 in)	Ole Miss Rebels	(United States)
PF	43	Néstor Colmenares	28 – 5 September 1987	2.03 m (6 ft 8 in)	Guaros de Lara	(Venezuela)

Head coach

- (Argentina) Néstor García

Assistant coach(es)

- (Venezuela) Nelson Solórzano
- (Venezuela) Daniel Seoane

Legend

- (C) Team captain
- Club – describes last
  club before the tournament
- Age – describes age
  on 6 August 2016

== Group B ==
=== Argentina ===
The following is the Argentina roster in the men's basketball tournament of the 2016 Summer Olympics.

Argentina men's national basketball team – 2016 Summer Olympics roster
Players
Coaches

Pos.	No.	Name	Age – Date of birth	Height	Club	Ctr.
PF	4	Luis Scola (C)	36 – 30 April 1980	2.06 m (6 ft 9 in)	Brooklyn Nets	(United States)
SG	5	Manu Ginóbili	39 – 28 July 1977	1.98 m (6 ft 6 in)	San Antonio Spurs	(United States)
PG	7	Facundo Campazzo	25 – 23 March 1991	1.80 m (5 ft 11 in)	CB Murcia	(Spain)
PG	8	Nicolás Laprovíttola	26 – 31 January 1990	1.90 m (6 ft 3 in)	Movistar Estudiantes	(Spain)
SG	9	Nicolás Brussino	23 – 2 March 1993	2.00 m (6 ft 7 in)	Peñarol	(Argentina)
SF	10	Carlos Delfino	33 – 29 August 1982	1.98 m (6 ft 6 in)	Unattached
C	12	Marcos Delía	24 – 8 April 1992	2.09 m (6 ft 10 in)	Obras Sanitarias	(Argentina)
SF	13	Andrés Nocioni	36 – 30 November 1979	2.02 m (6 ft 8 in)	Real Madrid	(Spain)
SF	14	Gabriel Deck	21 – 8 February 1995	2.00 m (6 ft 7 in)	Quimsa	(Argentina)
PF	19	Leo Mainoldi	31 – 4 March 1985	2.04 m (6 ft 8 in)	Gimnasia Indalo	(Argentina)
G/F	29	Patricio Garino	23 – 17 May 1993	1.98 m (6 ft 6 in)	George Washington Colonials	(United States)
C	35	Roberto Acuña	25 – 14 September 1990	2.08 m (6 ft 10 in)	Peñarol	(Argentina)

Head coach

- (Argentina) Sergio Hernández

Assistant coach(es)

- (Argentina) Nicolás Casalanguida
- (Argentina) Gonzalo García
- (Argentina) Silvio Santander

Legend

- (C) Team captain
- Club – describes last
  club before the tournament
- Age – describes age
  on 6 August 2016

=== Brazil ===
The following is the Brazil roster for the men's basketball tournament of the 2016 Summer Olympics.

Brazil men's national basketball team – 2016 Summer Olympics roster
Players
Coaches

Pos.	No.	Name	Age – Date of birth	Height	Club	Ctr.
PG	5	Raulzinho Neto	24 – 19 May 1992	1.92 m (6 ft 4 in)	Utah Jazz	(United States)
C	6	Cristiano Felício	24 – 7 July 1992	2.08 m (6 ft 10 in)	Chicago Bulls	(United States)
SG	8	Vítor Benite	26 – 20 February 1990	1.90 m (6 ft 3 in)	UCAM Murcia	(Spain)
PG	9	Marcelinho Huertas	33 – 25 May 1983	1.91 m (6 ft 3 in)	Los Angeles Lakers	(United States)
G/F	10	Alex Garcia	36 – 4 March 1980	1.92 m (6 ft 4 in)	Bauru	(Brazil)
F	12	Guilherme Giovannoni	36 – 2 June 1980	2.04 m (6 ft 8 in)	Brasília	(Brazil)
F/C	13	Nenê	33 – 13 September 1982	2.11 m (6 ft 11 in)	Houston Rockets	(United States)
SF	14	Marquinhos Vieira	32 – 31 May 1984	2.07 m (6 ft 9 in)	Flamengo	(Brazil)
SG	19	Leandro Barbosa	33 – 28 November 1982	1.94 m (6 ft 4 in)	Phoenix Suns	(United States)
F/C	23	Augusto Lima	24 – 17 September 1991	2.06 m (6 ft 9 in)	Real Madrid	(Spain)
F/C	30	Rafael Hettsheimeir	30 – 16 June 1986	2.08 m (6 ft 10 in)	Bauru	(Brazil)
PG	55	Rafael Luz	24 – 11 February 1992	1.88 m (6 ft 2 in)	Flamengo	(Brazil)

Head coach

- (Argentina) Rubén Magnano

Assistant coach(es)

- (Brazil) José Alves Neto
- (Brazil) Gustavo de Conti
- (Brazil) Demétrius Conrado Ferraciú

Legend

- Club – describes last
  club before the tournament
- Age – describes age
  on 6 August 2016

On 27 July, Anderson Varejão left the squad due to injury and was replaced by Cristiano Felício.

=== Croatia ===
The following is the Croatia roster in the men's basketball tournament of the 2016 Summer Olympics.

Croatia men's national basketball team – 2016 Summer Olympics roster
Players
Coaches

Pos.	No.	Name	Age – Date of birth	Height	Club	Ctr.
SF	4	Luka Babić	24 – 29 September 1991	2.01 m (6 ft 7 in)	Cedevita	(Croatia)
SG	5	Filip Krušlin	27 – 18 March 1989	1.96 m (6 ft 5 in)	Cedevita	(Croatia)
PG	6	Rok Stipčević	30 – 20 May 1986	1.85 m (6 ft 1 in)	Dinamo Sassari	(Italy)
SG	7	Krunoslav Simon	31 – 24 June 1985	1.97 m (6 ft 6 in)	Armani Milano	(Italy)
SF	8	Mario Hezonja	21 – 25 February 1995	2.03 m (6 ft 8 in)	Orlando Magic	(United States)
PF	9	Dario Šarić	22 – 8 April 1994	2.08 m (6 ft 10 in)	Anadolu Efes	(Turkey)
PG	10	Roko Ukić (C)	31 – 5 December 1984	1.96 m (6 ft 5 in)	Pallacanestro Cantù	(Italy)
C	12	Darko Planinić	25 – 22 November 1990	2.11 m (6 ft 11 in)	Laboral Kutxa	(Spain)
C	15	Miro Bilan	27 – 21 July 1989	2.15 m (7 ft 1 in)	Cedevita	(Croatia)
PF	33	Željko Šakić	28 – 14 April 1988	2.03 m (6 ft 8 in)	Cibona	(Croatia)
PF	35	Marko Arapović	20 – 20 July 1996	2.07 m (6 ft 9 in)	Cedevita	(Croatia)
SG	44	Bojan Bogdanović	27 – 18 April 1989	2.00 m (6 ft 7 in)	Brooklyn Nets	(United States)

Head coach

- (Croatia) Aleksandar Petrović

Assistant coach(es)

- (Croatia) Dražen Anzulović
- (Croatia) Ivica Skelin
- (Croatia) Dražen Orešković

Legend

- (C) Team captain
- Club – describes last
  club before the tournament
- Age – describes age
  on 6 August 2016

=== Lithuania ===
The following is the Lithuania roster in the men's basketball tournament of the 2016 Summer Olympics.

Lithuania men's national basketball team – 2016 Summer Olympics roster
Players
Coaches

Pos.	No.	Name	Age – Date of birth	Height	Club	Ctr.
PG	5	Mantas Kalnietis	29 – 6 September 1986	1.95 m (6 ft 5 in)	Olimpia Milano	(Italy)
G	7	Adas Juškevičius	27 – 3 January 1989	1.94 m (6 ft 4 in)	Lietuvos Rytas	(Lithuania)
SF	8	Jonas Mačiulis	31 – 10 February 1985	1.98 m (6 ft 6 in)	Real Madrid	(Spain)
SG	10	Renaldas Seibutis	31 – 23 July 1985	1.96 m (6 ft 5 in)	Žalgiris	(Lithuania)
F/C	11	Domantas Sabonis	20 – 3 May 1996	2.11 m (6 ft 11 in)	Gonzaga Bulldogs	(United States)
C	12	Antanas Kavaliauskas	31 – 19 September 1984	2.08 m (6 ft 10 in)	Lietuvos Rytas	(Lithuania)
PF	13	Paulius Jankūnas	32 – 29 April 1984	2.05 m (6 ft 9 in)	Žalgiris	(Lithuania)
C	15	Robertas Javtokas (C)	36 – 20 March 1980	2.11 m (6 ft 11 in)	Žalgiris	(Lithuania)
C	17	Jonas Valančiūnas	24 – 6 May 1992	2.13 m (7 ft 0 in)	Toronto Raptors	(Canada)
SF	19	Mindaugas Kuzminskas	26 – 19 October 1989	2.05 m (6 ft 9 in)	Unicaja Málaga	(Spain)
G/F	40	Marius Grigonis	22 – 26 April 1994	1.98 m (6 ft 6 in)	ICL Manresa	(Spain)
G	93	Vaidas Kariniauskas	22 – 16 November 1993	1.97 m (6 ft 6 in)	Kymis B.C.	(Greece)

Head coach

- (Lithuania) Jonas Kazlauskas

Assistant coach(es)

- (Lithuania) Darius Maskoliūnas
- (Lithuania) Gintaras Krapikas

Legend

- Club – describes last
  club before the tournament
- Age – describes age
  on 6 August 2016

=== Nigeria ===
The following is the Nigeria roster for the 2016 Summer Olympics. Captain Olumide Oyedeji quit the squad due to personal problems.

Nigeria men's national basketball team – 2016 Summer Olympics roster
Players
Coaches

Pos.	No.	Name	Age – Date of birth	Height	Club	Ctr.
PG	4	Ben Uzoh	28 – 18 March 1988	1.91 m (6 ft 3 in)	Unattached
PG	5	Michael Umeh	31 – 18 September 1984	1.88 m (6 ft 2 in)	Ironi Nahariya	(Israel)
F/C	6	Ike Diogu	32 – 11 September 1983	2.06 m (6 ft 9 in)	Guangdong Southern Tigers	(China)
G/F	7	Ebi Ere	35 – 2 August 1981	1.95 m (6 ft 5 in)	Capitanes de Arecibo	(Puerto Rico)
PG	8	Josh Akognon	30 – 10 February 1986	1.8 m (5 ft 11 in)	Dinamo Sassari	(Italy)
G/F	9	Chamberlain Oguchi	30 – 28 April 1986	1.98 m (6 ft 6 in)	Anwil Włocławek	(Poland)
G/F	10	Stan Okoye	25 – 10 April 1991	1.97 m (6 ft 6 in)	Pallacanestro Trapani	(Italy)
C	11	Andy Ogide	28 – 1 October 1987	2.04 m (6 ft 8 in)	Hapoel Migdal HaEmek	(Israel)
G	12	Michael Gbinije	24 – 5 June 1992	2.01 m (6 ft 7 in)	Syracuse Orange	(United States)
C	13	Shane Lawal	29 – 8 October 1986	2.06 m (6 ft 9 in)	FC Barcelona Lassa	(Spain)
F/C	14	Alade Aminu	28 – 14 September 1987	2.11 m (6 ft 11 in)	Hapoel Eilat B.C.	(Israel)
F/C	15	Ekene Ibekwe	31 – 19 July 1985	2.06 m (6 ft 9 in)	CEZ Nymburk	(Czech Republic)

Head coach

- (United States) Will Voigt

Assistant coach(es)

- (United States) John Kirk Bryant
- (Norway) Mathias Eckhoff

Legend

- (C) Team captain
- Club – describes last
  club before the tournament
- Age – describes age
  on 6 August 2016

=== Spain ===
The following is the Spain roster in the men's basketball tournament of the 2016 Summer Olympics.

Spain men's national basketball team – 2016 Summer Olympics roster
Players
Coaches

Pos.	No.	Name	Age – Date of birth	Height	Club	Ctr.
C	4	Pau Gasol	36 – 6 June 1980	2.13 m (7 ft 0 in)	Chicago Bulls	(United States)
SF	5	Rudy Fernández	31 – 4 April 1985	1.97 m (6 ft 6 in)	Real Madrid	(Spain)
PG	6	Sergio Rodríguez	30 – 12 June 1986	1.90 m (6 ft 3 in)	Real Madrid	(Spain)
SG	7	Juan Carlos Navarro	36 – 13 June 1980	1.93 m (6 ft 4 in)	FC Barcelona Lassa	(Spain)
PG	8	José Manuel Calderón	34 – 28 September 1981	1.91 m (6 ft 3 in)	New York Knicks	(United States)
PF	9	Felipe Reyes	36 – 16 March 1980	2.06 m (6 ft 9 in)	Real Madrid	(Spain)
PF	10	Víctor Claver	27 – 30 August 1988	2.06 m (6 ft 9 in)	Lokomotiv Kuban	(Russia)
C	14	Willy Hernangómez	22 – 27 May 1994	2.10 m (6 ft 11 in)	Real Madrid	(Spain)
SF	21	Álex Abrines	23 – 1 August 1993	1.98 m (6 ft 6 in)	FC Barcelona Lassa	(Spain)
SG	23	Sergio Llull	28 – 15 November 1987	1.92 m (6 ft 4 in)	Real Madrid	(Spain)
PF	44	Nikola Mirotić	25 – 11 February 1991	2.08 m (6 ft 10 in)	Chicago Bulls	(United States)
PG	79	Ricky Rubio	25 – 21 October 1990	1.93 m (6 ft 4 in)	Minnesota Timberwolves	(United States)

Head coach

- (Italy) Sergio Scariolo

Assistant coach(es)

- (Spain) Jaume Ponsarnau
- (Spain) Txus Vidorreta
- (Spain) Ángel Sánchez-Cañete

Legend

- Club – describes last
  club before the tournament
- Age – describes age
  on 6 August 2016

== See also ==
- Basketball at the 2016 Summer Olympics – Women's team rosters
