= Karlīne Nīmane =

Latvian basketball player

TTT Riga
- Position: Power forward
- League: LWBL

Personal information
- Born: 1990 (age 35–36) Cēsis, Latvia

Karlīne Nīmane is a Latvian basketball player. She plays for TTT Riga and Latvia women's national basketball team. She has represented national team in EuroBasket Women 2011.
