= Kate Butters =

British basketball player

Personal information
- Born: 25 July 1986 (age 40) Eastbourne, United Kingdom
- Listed height: 1.78 m (5 ft 10 in)

Career information
- Playing career: 2008–present
- Position: Small forward

Career history
- 2008-2009: Nottingham Wildcats
- 2009-present: Cardiff Archers

Kate Butters (born 25 July 1986) is a British female professional basketball player.
