= Mamadou Gaye =

Senegalese basketball coach

Mamadou Gaye is a Senegalese basketball coach. He coached the Senegalese national team at the 2016 Summer Olympics, where the team finished twelfth.
