= Mantė Kvederavičiūtė =

Lithuanian basketball player

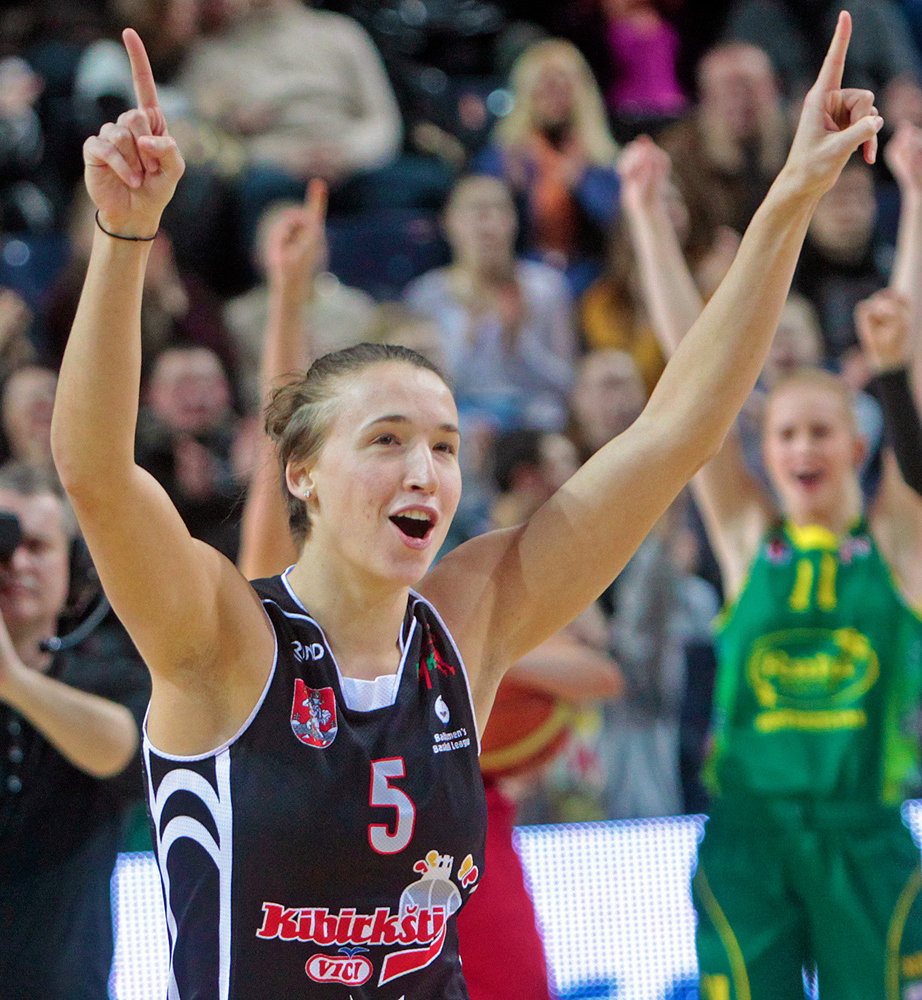
- Kvederavičiūtė in 2013

Proteas Voulas
- Position: Shooting guard
- League: Greek First League

Personal information
- Born: 28 November 1990 (age 35) Prienai, Lithuania
- Listed height: 180 cm (5 ft 11 in)
- Listed weight: 67 kg (148 lb)

Career information
- WNBA draft: 2012: undrafted
- Playing career: 2008–present

Career history
- 2008–2011: Laisve Kaunas
- 2011–2012: Kaunas VIČI-Aistės
- 2012–2014: Kibirkstis Vilnius
- 2014–2015: Udominate Umeå
- 2015–2016: Utena
- 2016–present: Proteas Voulas

Mantė Kvederavičiūtė (born 28 November 1990) is a Lithuanian basketball player who plays at shooting guard position. She has competed for Lithuania in all major European tournaments since 2011.
