= Marie-Sadio Rosche =

Senegalese basketball player

Avenir Basket Chartres
- Position: Center
- League: LFB

Personal information
- Born: August 10, 1987 (age 39)
- Listed height: 6 ft 3 in (1.91 m)

Marie-Sadio Beatrice Rosche (born August 10, 1987) is a Senegalese basketball player. She represented Senegal in the basketball competition at the 2016 Summer Olympics.
