= Antonio Carlos Barbosa =

Brazilian basketball coach

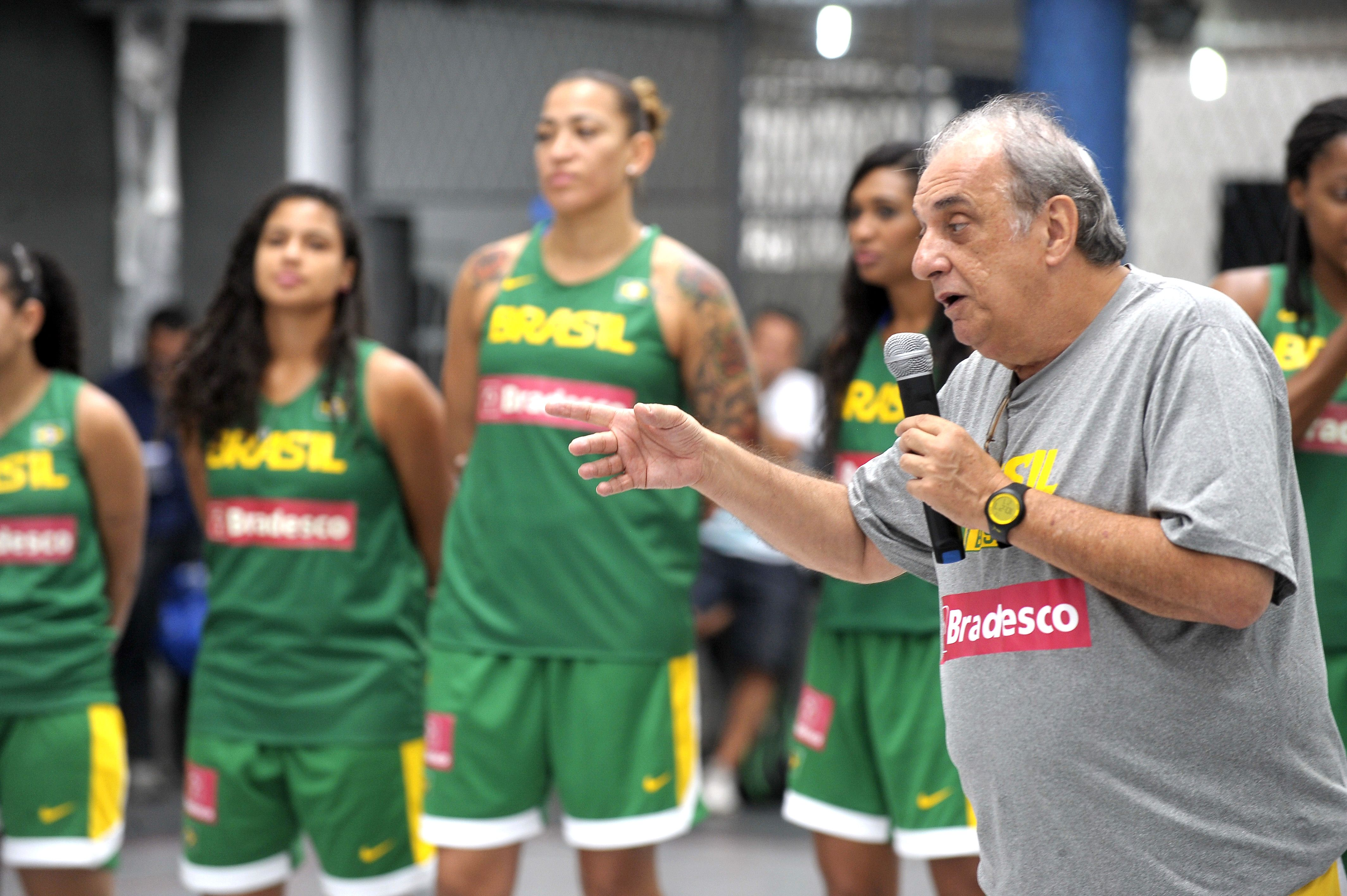
Antonio Carlos Barbosa

Antonio Carlos Barbosa is a Brazilian basketball coach. He coached the Brazilian national team at the 2016 Summer Olympics, where the team finished eleventh.
