= Tereza Krakovičová =

Czech basketball player

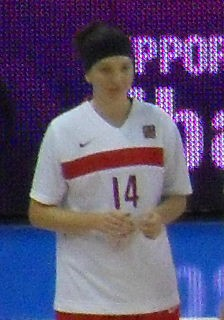
- Tereza Pecková in 2010

BK Brno
- Position: Forward
- League: ZBL

Personal information
- Born: 10 July 1987 (age 39) Ústí nad Labem, Czechoslovakia
- Listed height: 6 ft 2 in (1.88 m)

Tereza Krakovičová (née Pecková, Czech pronunciation: [ˈtɛrɛza ˈpɛtskovaː]; born 10 July 1987) is a Czech professional basketball player. She plays for Czech Republic women's national basketball team. She competed in the 2012 Summer Olympics where the Czech team came 7th.
