= Zane Jākobsone =

Latvian basketball player

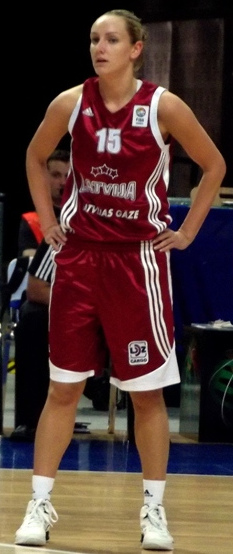

TTT Riga
- Position: Small forward
- League: LWBL

Personal information
- Born: November 30, 1985 (age 40) Riga, Latvian SSR, Soviet Union

Zane Jākobsone is a Latvian basketball player. She plays for TTT Riga and Latvia women's national basketball team. She has represented national team in EuroBasket Women 2011.
