= Lauren Thomas-Johnson =

British basketball player

No. 6 – Manchester Mystics
- Position: Small forward
- League: WBBL

Personal information
- Born: 25 May 1988 (age 38) Stockport, United Kingdom
- Listed height: 1.80 m (5 ft 11 in)

Career information
- Playing career: 20??–present

Career history
- ?: Notre Dame Academy
- 2006-2008: Kirkwood Community College
- 2008-2010: Marquette University
- ?: Haukar
- ?: CB Islas Canarias
- 2011-2012: Sheffield Hatters
- 2012-2013: Pallacanestro Muraltese
- 2013-2016: Sheffield Hatters
- 2016-2020: Manchester Mystics

Lauren Thomas-Johnson (born 25 May 1988) is a British female professional basketball player.
