= AZS AJP Gorzów Wielkopolski =

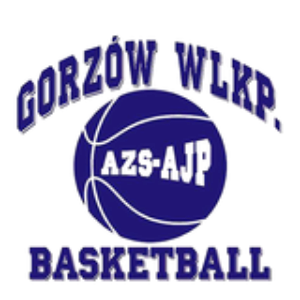
- Nickname: Akademiczki
- League: Basket Liga Kobiet; EuroCup
- Founded: 2001; 25 years ago
- History: AZS PWSZ Gorzów Wielkopolski (2001–2015); AZS AJP Gorzów Wielkopolski (2016–present)
- Arena: Arena Gorzów
- Capacity: 5,191
- Location: Gorzów Wielkopolski, Poland
- Team colours: Navy, azure, white
- Main sponsor: Kostrzyn–Słubice Special Economic Zone; Enea
- President: Michał Kugler
- Head coach: Dariusz Maciejewski
- Team captain: Klaudia Gertchen
- Retired numbers: 1 (4)
- Website: azsajpgorzow.pl
Home	Away

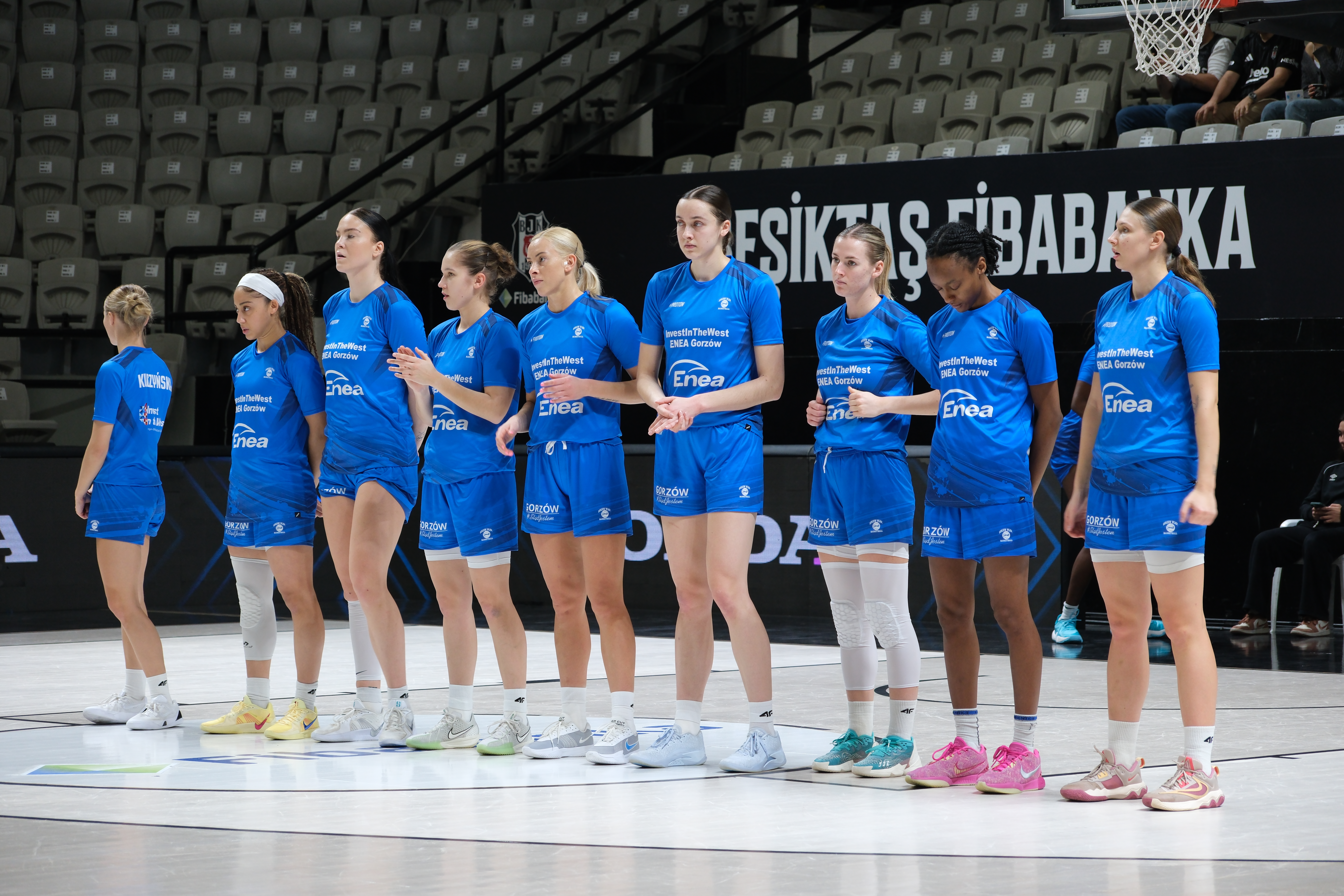
AZS AJP in season 2024–25

AZS AJP Gorzów Wielkopolski is a Polish professional women's basketball club that was founded in 2001 in the city of Gorzów Wielkopolski. Club plays in the Basket Liga Kobiet – the highest competition in Poland, and internationally in the EuroCup Women.

== Honours ==
=== Domestic ===
- Polish League
  - Runners-up (5): 2008–09, 2009–10, 2018–19, 2023–24, 2024–25
  - Third (6): 2007–08, 2010–11, 2019–20, 2020–21, 2022–23, 2025–26
- Polish Cup
  - Winners (1): 2025
  - Runners-up (2): 2023, 2026
- Polish Super Cup
  - Winners (1): 2025

== Season by season ==
Season	Tier	Division	Pos.	European competitions	
2001–02	2	I Liga	5th		
2002–03	2	I Liga	5th		
2003–04	2	I Liga	1st		
2004–05	1	BLK	8th		
2005–06	1	BLK	5th		
2006–07	1	BLK	4th		
2007–08	1	BLK	3rd	2 EuroCup Women	R16
2008–09	1	BLK	2nd	2 EuroCup Women	RS
2009–10	1	BLK	2nd	1 EuroLeague Women	RS
2010–11	1	BLK	3rd	1 EuroLeague Women	RS
2011–12	1	BLK	7th		
2012–13	1	BLK	6th		
2013–14	1	BLK	5th		
2014–15	1	BLK	5th		
2015–16	1	BLK	10th		
2016–17	1	BLK	6th		
2017–18	1	BLK	7th	2 EuroCup Women	RS
2018–19	1	BLK	2nd	2 EuroCup Women	R16
2019–20	1	BLK	3rd	2 EuroCup Women	R32
2020–21	1	BLK	3rd	2 EuroCup Women	R16
2021–22	1	BLK	4th	2 EuroCup Women	RS
2022–23	1	BLK	3rd	2 EuroCup Women	R16
2023–24	1	BLK	2nd	2 EuroCup Women	R16
2024–25	1	BLK	2nd	2 EuroCup Women	R32
2025–26	1	BLK	3rd	2 EuroCup Women	RS

== Players ==
=== Current roster ===
Note: Flags indicate national team eligibility at FIBA-sanctioned events. Players may hold other non-FIBA nationalities not displayed.

PolskaStrefaInwestycji Enea Gorzów Wielkopolski roster
Players
Coaches

Pos.	No.	Nat.	Name	Ht.	Wt.	Age
SG	91	(Poland)	Bęczkowska, Julia	1.74 m (5 ft 9 in)		20 – 1 February 2006
SG	1	(United States)	Miller, Diamond	1.91 m (6 ft 3 in)	76 kg (168 lb)	25 – 11 February 2001
F	15	(Poland)	Gertchen, Klaudia (C)	1.82 m (6 ft 0 in)		30 – 11 July 1996
SG	94	(Poland)	Kobylińska, Joanna	1.80 m (5 ft 11 in)		24 – 19 January 2002
G/F	20	(Poland)	Kośla, Emilia	1.78 m (5 ft 10 in)		25 – 10 January 2001
PG	2	(Poland)	Kuczyńska, Wiktoria	1.68 m (5 ft 6 in)		25 – 24 January 2001
SF	95	(Poland)	Lebiecka, Gabriela	1.80 m (5 ft 11 in)		22 – 23 September 2003
F/C	7	(Slovakia)	Mikulášiková, Rebeka	1.93 m (6 ft 4 in)		27 – 31 July 1999
G/F	92	(Poland)	Molik, Julia	1.78 m (5 ft 10 in)		19 – 13 January 2007
F/C	94	(Poland)	Steblecka, Weronika	1.85 m (6 ft 1 in)		21 – 17 June 2005
F/C	99	(Poland)	Śmiałek, Ewelina	1.90 m (6 ft 3 in)		24 – 29 March 2002
PG	5	(Greece)	Tsineke, Elena	1.73 m (5 ft 8 in)		27 – 11 July 1999
SG	32	(United States)	Walker-Kimbrough, Shatori	1.80 m (5 ft 11 in)	64 kg (141 lb)	31 – 18 May 1995

Head coach

- (Poland) Dariusz Maciejewski

Assistant coach(es)

- (Poland) Janusz Kopaczewski
- (Poland) Robert Pieczyrak

Athletic trainer(s)

Legend

- (C) Team captain
- Injured

- Roster
- Transactions
Updated: November 7, 2024

=== Retired numbers ===
AZS AJP Gorzów Wielkopolski retired numbers
Pos.	No.	Nat.	Name	Tenure	Date of the ceremony
PG	4	(Poland)	Dźwigalska, Katarzyna	2001–22	30 October 2022

=== Notable players ===
Note: Flags indicate national team eligibility at FIBA-sanctioned events. Players may hold other non-FIBA nationalities not displayed.

Criteria

To appear in this section a player must have either:

- Set a club record or won an individual award while at the club
- Played at least one official international match for their national team at any time
- Played at least one official NBA match at any time.

- (Australia) Chloe Bibby
- (United States) Kahleah Copper
- (Poland) Katarzyna Dźwigalska
- (Poland) Klaudia Gertchen
- (Bosnia and Herzegovina) Courtney Hurt
- (Lithuania) Laura Juškaitė
- (Slovakia) Rebeka Mikulášiková
- (United States) Diamond Miller
- (Slovenia) Annamaria Prezelj
- (Australia) Samantha Richards
- (Belarus) Yuliya Rytsikava
- (Australia) Alanna Smith
- (Poland) Agnieszka Szott
- (Poland) Weronika Telenga
- (Greece) Elena Tsineke
- (United States) Shatori Walker-Kimbrough
- (United States) Sharnee Zoll-Norman
- (Poland) Justyna Żurowska-Cegielska

Stephanie Talbot

Liudmila Sapova

Yelena Leuchanka

Kyara Lyskens

== Coaches ==
- (Poland) Dariusz Maciejewski (2001– )
