= KS Cukierki Odra Brzeg =

KS Cukierki Odra Brzeg is a Polish women basketball team, based in Brzeg, playing in Ford Germaz Ekstraklasa (PLKK). The club was founded in 1977.

The team's websites are: odra.e-basket.pl www.odra.polskikosz.pl

== 2003/2004 season ==
KS Cukierki Odra Brzeg won 8th place in Sharp Torell Basket Liga.

== 2004/2005 season ==
KS Cukierki Odra Brzeg won 7th place in Torell Basket Liga.

== 2005/2006 season ==
KS Cukierki Odra Brzeg won 6th place in Ford Germaz Basket Liga.

== 2006/2007 season ==
KS Cukierki Odra Brzeg won 9th place in Ford Germaz Ekstraklasa.
