= Rebeka Mikulášiková =

Slovak basketball player (born 1999)

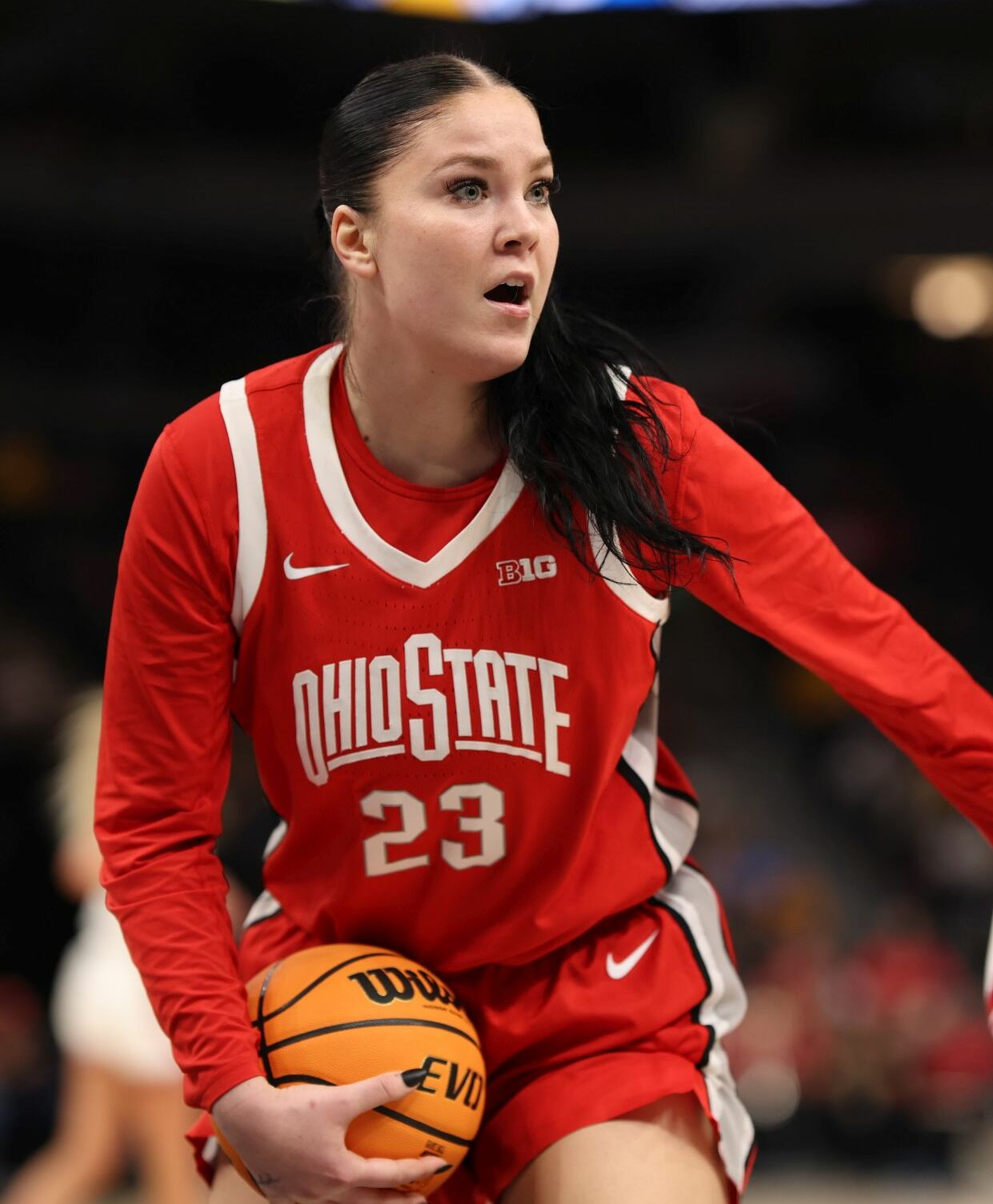
- Mikulášiková with Ohio State in 2023

No. 23 – Ohio State Buckeyes
- Position: Forward
- League: Big Ten Conference

Personal information
- Born: July 31, 1999 (age 27) Nitra, Slovakia
- Listed height: 6 ft 4 in (1.93 m)

Career information
- College: Ohio State (2019–2024)

Career history
- 2016–2019: Piešťanské Čajky

Career highlights
- Slovak Cup winner (2017)

Rebeka Mikulášiková (born July 31, 1999) is a Slovak college basketball that played for the Ohio State Buckeyes of the Big Ten Conference.

== Early life ==
In 2013 at the age of 14, Mikulášiková started her career in the youth division in the Slovak extra league in her native Nitra. She was recognised in the Young Sportsperson of the Year awards in Nitra for 2014. At the age of 16, she transferred in July 2016 to the Piešťanské Čajky team, where she played three seasons. In 2017, she won the Slovak Cup with the team. Following the end of the 2018–19 season, Mikulášiková left Piešťanské Čajky to study and play basketball in the United States.

== College career ==
Mikulášiková moved to Columbus, Ohio to study and play for collegiate basketball program the Ohio State Buckeyes. In 2019–20, a season impacted by the COVID-19 pandemic in the United States, she played 29 games for her college in what was her first season.

Mikulášiková finished the 2022–23 season with 10.1 average points, as well as averages of 3.7 rebounds and 1.5 assists, missing just one game. During the season she recorded a career-high 23 points in a 82–64 win against Boston College in November 2022. Mikulášiková continued playing on the team in the 2023–24 season as a graduate student. In December 2023, Mikulášiková reached 1,000 points for Ohio State, becoming the 37th player to do so.

== National team career ==
Mikulášiková played in the 2016 FIBA U18 Women's European Championship in Sopron, Hungary. Slovakia finished the tournament in 15th and were relegated out of division A. Mikulášiková participated in the EuroBasket Women 2017. In 2018, she missed playing with the Slovak national team at the 2018 FIBA U20 Women's European Championship in Sopron due a knee injury.
