= Nádia Colhado =

Brazilian basketball player (born 1989)

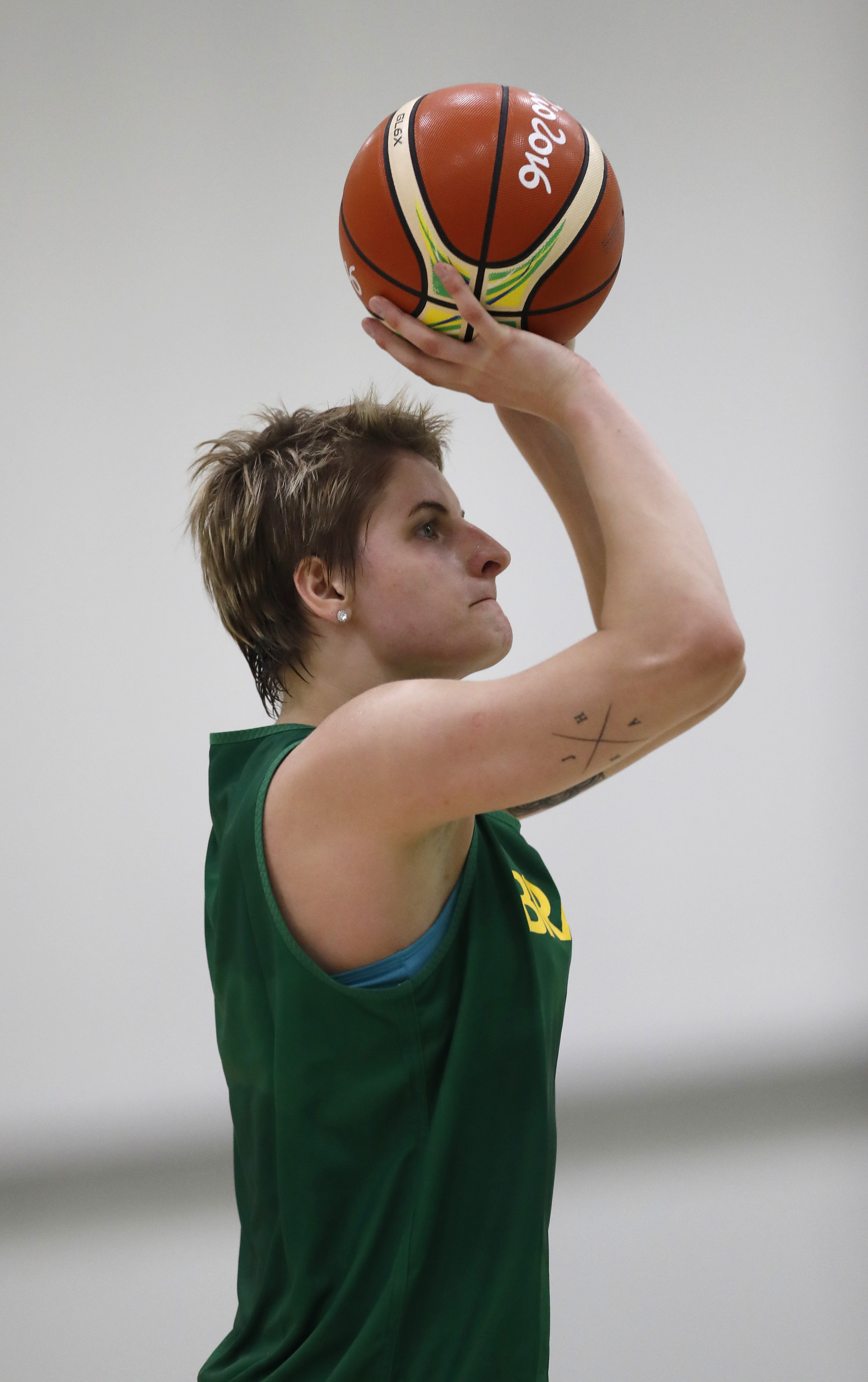
- Colhado with Brazil at the 2016 Summer Olympics

Personal information
- Born: February 25, 1989 (age 37) Marialva, Paraná, Brazil
- Listed height: 6 ft 4 in (1.93 m)
- Listed weight: 196 lb (89 kg)

Career information
- Playing career: 2007–2024; retired
- Position: Center

Career history
- 2011–2012: Santo André
- 2012–2013: São José
- 2013–2014: Sport Recife
- 2014–2015: Atlanta Dream
- 2014–2015: São José
- 2015–2016: Sampaio Basquete
- 2016–2017: IDK Gipuzkoa
- 2017: Indiana Fever
- 2017-2019: Uni Girona CB
- 2019-20: Flammes Carolo Basket
- 2020-2021: Gernika KESB
- 2021-2023: Sampaio Basquete
- 2024: Ponta Grossa

Career highlights
- Brazilian National League champion (2016); Spanish National League champion (2019); Spanish National League MVP (2016-17)
- Stats at WNBA.com
- Stats at Basketball Reference

Nádia Gomes Colhado (Marialva, February 25, 1989) is a retired Brazilian professional basketball player. She has competed for the Brazil women's national basketball team at the 2012 and 2016 Summer Olympics, the 2014 FIBA World Championship for Women, and FIBA Americas tournaments.

During the 2013–14 Brazilian championship (LBF), Colhado played with Érika de Souza and Tiffany Hayes, both from the WNBA's Atlanta Dream, for Sport Recife. While Dream coach Michael Cooper visited his players, he was impressed with Colhado and invited her to the team's training camp prior to the 2014 WNBA season. She eventually passed the tests to join Atlanta, and despite having limited minutes due to the Dream's abundance of centers, took part in 16 games of the regular season. Colhado played 6 more games in the 2015 WNBA season before being waived by the Dream. Following the dismissal she returned to Brazil, signing with Sampaio Basquete and winning the 2015-16 national championship. During the 2016–17 season, she played in Spain, in IDK Gipuzkoa from San Sebastian and was named MVP of the competition. In 2017, Colhado signed with the Fever. In the offseason, she played for another Spanish team, Uni Girona, with whom she eventually won the 2018-19 Liga Femenina de Baloncesto. Colhado played the 2020-21 LFB for Gernika KESB. In 2024, having finished the LBF season for Ponta Grossa, Colhado announced her retirement.

== Non-WNBA club history ==
- Divino/COC/Jundiaí (Brazil)
- Universidad Leon (Spain)
- São Caetano (Brazil)
- Santo André (Brazil)
- São José (Brazil)
- Sport Recife (Brazil)
- Sampaio Basquete (Brazil)
- IDK Gipuzkoa (Spain)
- Uni Girona (Spain)
- Flammes Carolo Basket (France)
- Gernika KESB (Spain)
- Campinas (Brazil)
- Ponta Grossa (Brazil)
