= Anatoli Buyalski =

Belarusian basketball coach

Anatoli Buyalski is a Belarusian basketball coach. He coached the Belarusian national team at the 2016 Summer Olympics, where the team finished ninth.
