= Rose Anderson =

Scottish basketball player (born 1988)

UWIC Archers
- Position: Guard
- League: English Basketball League Women's Division 1

Personal information
- Born: 23 March 1988 (age 38) Scotland

Career information
- College: University of Central Oklahoma

Career history
- 2008–: UWIC Archers

Rose Anderson (born 23 March 1988, Edinburgh) is a Scottish female basketball player. She currently plays for UWIC Archers in the English Basketball League, and was part of the British team for the 2012 Summer Olympics.

== Career ==
Anderson attended Portobello High School in Edinburgh. She appeared on the Scottish junior basketball team, and gradually moved up in the age brackets until she was captain of the Great Britain under-20s basketball team, and played for Edinburgh Kool Kats. She moved to the United States in 2006 on a scholarship to attend the Northern Oklahoma College, before going moving onto the University of Central Oklahoma in 2008. Because of college eligibility rules, she couldn't play for the University's basketball team during her final season, and so took up rowing in the meanwhile.

She currently plays for the UWIC Archers in the Women's Division 1 of the English Basketball League. She was a member of the team that won the Division for the first time in the club's history during the 2011-12 season. She was first announced as part of the 18 strong training squad for Great Britain at the Olympics, and when on 23 June the final squad was announced, she remained part of it.

It was the first time that Great Britain has put forward a female basketball team for the Olympics, and she also became the first alumni of the University of Central Oklahoma to be named to an Olympic squad. When Rose played against Australia in Great Britain's first match on 28 July 2012, Anderson became the first Scottish player ever to play basketball in the Olympics as, although the British men's team contained two Scottish players, they did not play their game until the day after the Australia game.

== Personal life ==
Her brother is boxer Kenny Anderson, and at one point in her career she thought of following him into the ring instead of the basketball court.
