= Katarzyna Dźwigalska =

Polish basketball player

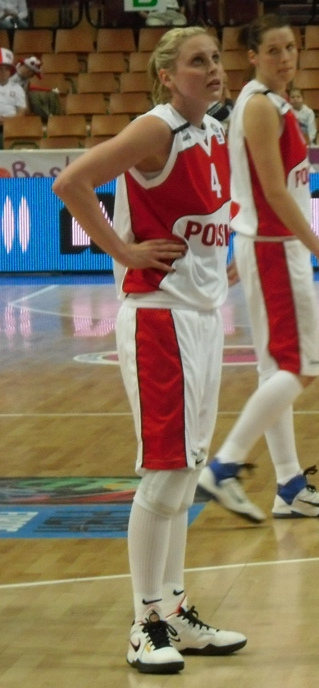
- Katarzyna Dźwigalska(Polish basketball player), during the 2011 European Women's Basketball Championship in Katowice.

No. 4 – AZS Gorzów
- Position: Shooting guard
- League: PLKK

Personal information
- Born: 25 August 1985 (age 41) Gorzów Wielkopolski, Poland
- Listed height: 1.74 m (5 ft 9 in)

Career information
- Playing career: 2004–present

Career history
- 2004-present: AZS Gorzów

Katarzyna Czubak, married Dźwigalska (born 25 August 1985) is a Polish female professional basketball player.
