= Fenerbahçe (women's basketball) past rosters =

== 1990 Era ==
=== 1998/99 ===
Roster

- (Hungary) Andrea Nagy
- (Turkey) Arzu Özyiğit
- (Turkey) Ceren Ateş
- (Turkey) Ceyda Evrengül
- (United States) Clarissa Davis
- (Turkey) Didem Akın
- (Turkey) Nalan Mete
- (Turkey) Serap Yücesir
- (Turkey) Tuğba Cengiz
- (Turkey) Yeliz Şahin

Head coach: (Turkey) Murat Yosmaoğlu

=== 1999/00 ===
Roster

- (Hungary) Andrea Nagy
- (Turkey) Arzu Özyiğit
- (United States) Bridgette Gordon
- (Turkey) Ceyda Evrengül
- (United States) Clarissa Davis
- (Turkey) Didem Akın
- (Russia) Elena Baranova
- (Bulgaria) Gergena Baranzova
- (Turkey) Gülşah Akkaya
- (Turkey) Nalan Mete
- (Turkey) Serap Yücesir
- (United States) Shannon Johnson
- (United States) Tonya Edwards
- (Turkey) Yeliz Şahin

Head coach: (Turkey) Zafer Kalaycıoğlu

== 2000 Era ==
=== 2000/01 ===
Roster

- (Turkey) Arzu Özyiğit
- (Turkey) Burcu Yenigün
- (Turkey) Ceyda Evrengül
- (Turkey) Didem Akın
- (Turkey) Nalan Mete
- (Russia) Oksana Zakalyuzhnaya
- (Turkey) Serap Yücesir
- (United States) Tiffani Johnson
- (United States) Tonya Edwards
- (Turkey) Yeliz Şahin

Head coach: (Turkey) Zafer Kalaycıoğlu

=== 2001/02 ===
Roster

- (Turkey) Arzu Özyiğit
- (Turkey) Ceyda Evrengül
- (United States) Danielle McCulley
- (Turkey) Didem Akın
- (Turkey) Didem Tok
- (Turkey) Esmeral Özçelik
- (Turkey) Melis Ülker
- (Turkey) Nalan Mete
- (Russia) Oksana Zakalyuzhnaya
- (Turkey) Sariye Gökçe
- (Turkey) Serap Yücesir
- (Turkey) Sezen Mercan
- (Turkey) Şükran Albayrak
- (United States) Vicki Hall

Head coach: (Turkey) Zafer Kalaycıoğlu

=== 2002/03 ===
Roster

- (Turkey) Ceyda Evrengül
- (United States) Coco Miller
- (Turkey) Devran Tanaçan
- (Turkey) Esmeral Tunçluer
- (Bulgaria) Gergena Baranzova
- (United States) Kelly Miller
- (Turkey) Melike Bakırcıoğlu
- (Czech Republic) Michaela Pavlíčková
- (Turkey) Nalan Mete
- (Turkey) Sariye Gökçe
- (Turkey) Serap Yücesir
- (Turkey) Şükran Albayrak

Head coach: (Turkey) Zafer Kalaycıoğlu

=== 2003/04 ===
Roster

- (Turkey) Arzu Özyiğit
- (United States) Bethany Donaphin
- (Turkey) Ceyda Evrengül
- (United States) Coco Miller
- (Turkey) Devran Tanaçan
- (Turkey) Esra Şencebe
- (United States) Kelly Miller
- (Turkey) Melike Bakırcıoğlu
- (Turkey) Müjde Yüksel
- (Turkey) Nalan Mete
- (Turkey) Nilay Yiğit
- (United States) Summer Erb
- (Turkey) Şükran Albayrak
- (Turkey) Tuğçe İnöntepe

Head coach: (Turkey) Zafer Kalaycıoğlu

=== 2004/05 ===
Roster

- (Turkey) Arzu Özyiğit
- (Turkey) Esra Şencebe
- (Serbia) Ivona Jerković
- (Croatia) Korana Longin-Zanze
- (United States) Marie Ferdinand-Harris
- (Turkey) Müjde Yüksel
- (Turkey) Nalan Mete
- (Turkey) Nazlı Güler
- (Turkey) Nilay Yiğit
- (Turkey) Serap Yücesir
- (Turkey) Şaziye İvegin
- (Turkey) Şükran Albayrak
- (United States) Tiffani Johnson

Head coach: (Turkey) Zafer Kalaycıoğlu

=== 2005/06 ===
Roster

- (United States) Andrea Gardner
- (Turkey) Begüm Dalgalar
- (Turkey) Birsel Vardarlı
- (Turkey) Esra Şencebe
- (Turkey) Korel Engin
- (Croatia) Korana Longin-Zanze
- (Turkey) Melike Bakırcıoğlu
- (Turkey) Nalan Mete
- (Turkey) Nevriye Yılmaz
- (United States) Nicole Powell
- (Turkey) Nilay Yiğit
- (Turkey) Serap Yücesir
- (Turkey) Şaziye İvegin
- (United States) Tan White
- (Turkey) Şükran Albayrak

Head coach: (Turkey) Zafer Kalaycıoğlu

=== 2006/07 ===
Roster

- (United States) Barbara Turner
- (Turkey) Begüm Dalgalar
- (Turkey) Birsel Vardarlı
- (Turkey) Burcu Erbaş
- (United States) Cappie Pondexter
- (Turkey) Duygu Fırat
- (Turkey) Esmeral Tunçluer
- (Germany) Linda Frohlich
- (Turkey) Melike Bakırcıoğlu
- (Turkey) Nalan Ramazanoğlu
- (Turkey) Nevriye Yılmaz
- (Turkey) Nilay Yiğit
- (Turkey) Selin Ekiz
- (Turkey) Şaziye İvegin-Karslı
- (Canada) Tammy Sutton-Brown
- (Turkey) Tuğçe Murat

Head coach: (Turkey) Zafer Kalaycıoğlu

=== 2007/08 ===
Roster

- (Turkey) Begüm Dalgalar
- (Turkey) Birsel Vardarlı
- (Turkey) Burcu Erbaş
- (United States) Cappie Pondexter
- (United States) Ebony Hoffman
- (Turkey) Esmeral Tunçluer
- (Bulgaria) Gergena Baranzova
- (Turkey) Melike Bakırcıoğlu
- (Turkey) Nalan Ramazanoğlu
- (Turkey) Nevriye Yılmaz
- (Turkey) Selin Ekiz
- (Belarus) Sviatlana Volnaya
- (Canada) Tammy Sutton-Brown
- (Turkey) Tuğçe Murat

Head coach: (Turkey) Zafer Kalaycıoğlu

=== 2008/09 ===
Roster

- (Turkey) Begüm Dalgalar
- (Turkey) Birsel Vardarlı
- (Turkey) Burcu Erbaş
- (Turkey) Duygu Fırat
- (France) Émilie Gomis
- (Turkey) Esmeral Tunçluer
- (Bulgaria) Gergena Baranzova
- (United States) Katie Smith
- (United States) Matee Ajavon
- (Turkey) Melike Bakırcıoğlu
- (Turkey) Nalan Ramazanoğlu
- (Turkey) Nevin Nevlin
- (Turkey) Nevriye Yılmaz
- (United States) Nicole Powell
- (Turkey) Selin Ekiz
- (Canada) Tammy Sutton-Brown
- (Turkey) Tuğçe Murat

Head coach: (Turkey) Haydar Kemal Ateş

=== 2009/10 ===
Roster

- (Turkey) Begüm Dalgalar
- (Turkey) Birsel Vardarlı
- (Turkey) Devran Tanaçan
- (United States) Ebony Hoffman
- (Turkey) Esmeral Tunçluer
- (United States) Matee Ajavon
- (Turkey) Melike Bakırcıoğlu
- (Turkey) Nevin Nevlin
- (Turkey) Nevriye Yılmaz (C)
- (United States) Nicole Powell
- (Australia) Penny Taylor
- (Canada) Tammy Sutton-Brown

Head coach: (Turkey) Aydın Uğuz

== 2010 Era ==
=== 2010/11 ===
Roster

- (Latvia) Anete Jēkabsone-Žogota
- (United States) Angel McCoughtry
- (Hungary) Anna Vajda
- (Turkey) Begüm Dalgalar
- (Turkey) Birsel Vardarlı
- (Turkey) Devran Tanaçan
- (United States) Diana Taurasi
- (Turkey) Ecem Güler
- (Turkey) Esmeral Tunçluer
- (Czech Republic) Hana Horáková
- (Serbia) Ivana Matović
- (Turkey) Nevin Nevlin
- (Turkey) Nevriye Yılmaz (C)
- (Turkey) Olcay Çakır
- (Turkey) Özge Kavurmacıoğlu
- (Australia) Penny Taylor
- (Turkey) Şaziye İvegin
- (Canada) Tammy Sutton-Brown

Head coach: (Hungary) László Rátgéber

=== 2011/12 ===
Roster

- (United States) Angel McCoughtry
- (Turkey) Birsel Vardarlı
- (United States) Cappie Pondexter
- (Turkey) Devran Tanaçan
- (Turkey) Ecem Güler
- (Latvia) Elīna Babkina
- (Turkey) Emel Türkyılmaz
- (Turkey) Esmeral Tunçluer
- (Serbia) Ivana Matović
- (Turkey) Kübra Siyahdemir
- (Turkey) Nevin Nevlin
- (Turkey) Nevriye Yılmaz (C)
- (Turkey) Olcay Çakır
- (Turkey) Özge Kavurmacıoğlu
- (Australia) Penny Taylor
- (Latvia) Zane Tamane
- Head coach: (Greece) George Dikeoulakos

=== 2012/13 ===
Roster

- (Poland) Agnieszka Bibrzycka
- (Belarus) Anastasiya Verameyenka
- (United States) Angel McCoughtry
- (Turkey) Birsel Vardarlı (C)
- (United States) Cappie Pondexter
- (Turkey) Devran Tanaçan
- (Turkey) Ecem Güler
- (Turkey) Emel Türkyılmaz
- (Turkey) Esmeral Tunçluer
- (Serbia) Ivana Matović
- (Turkey) Kübra Siyahdemir
- (Turkey) Nevin Nevlin
- (Turkey) Olcay Çakır
- (Turkey) Özge Kavurmacıoğlu
- Head coach: (Spain) Roberto Íñiguez

=== 2013/14 ===
Roster

- (Poland) Agnieszka Bibrzycka
- (Belarus) Anastasiya Verameyenka
- (United States) Angel McCoughtry
- (Turkey) Birsel Vardarlı (C)
- (United States) Cappie Pondexter
- (Turkey) Esmeral Tunçluer
- (Serbia) Ivana Matović
- (France) Isabelle Yacoubou
- (Turkey) Kübra Siyahdemir
- (Turkey) Nevin Nevlin
- (Turkey) Olcay Çakır
- (Turkey) Quanitra Hollingsworth
- (Turkey) Tuğçe Canıtez
- Head coach: (Spain) Roberto Íñiguez

=== 2014/15 ===
Roster

- (Poland) Agnieszka Bibrzycka
- (United States) Angel McCoughtry
- (Spain) Astou Ndour
- (Turkey) Birsel Vardarlı (C)
- (Turkey) Kübra Siyahdemir
- (Serbia) Miljana Bojović
- (Turkey) Olcay Çakır
- (Turkey) Quanitra Hollingsworth
- (United States) Shavonte Zellous
- (United States) Tina Charles
- (Turkey) Tuğba Palazoğlu
- (Turkey) Tuğçe Canıtez
- Head coach: (Poland) Jacek Winnicki

=== 2015/16 ===
Roster

- (Hungary) Allie Quigley
- (Belarus) Anastasiya Verameyenka
- (Turkey) Birsel Vardarlı (C)
- (Turkey) Gökçe Doğan
- (Lithuania) Kamilė Nacickaitė
- (Turkey) Hülya Çoklar
- (United States) Jantel Lavender
- (United States) Marissa Coleman
- (Turkey) Melis Gülcan
- (Turkey) Melisa Korkmaz
- (Turkey) Olcay Çakır
- (Turkey) Quanitra Hollingsworth
- (Turkey) Tuğçe Canıtez
- Head coach: (Greece) George Dikeoulakos

=== 2016/17 ===
Roster

- (Hungary) Allie Quigley
- (Belarus) Anastasiya Verameyenka
- (Turkey) Ayşe Cora
- (Turkey) Birsel Vardarlı (C)
- (United States) Candace Parker
- (Turkey) Esra Ural
- (United States) Jantel Lavender
- (Turkey) Melis Gülcan
- (Turkey) Melisa Korkmaz
- (Turkey) Pelin Bilgiç
- (France) Sandrine Gruda
- (Turkey) Tuğçe Canıtez
- Head coach: (Turkey) Fırat Okul

=== 2017/18 ===
Roster

- (Serbia) Ana Dabović
- (Belarus) Anastasiya Verameyenka
- (Turkey) Ayşe Cora
- (Turkey) Birsel Vardarlı (C)
- (Turkey) Esra Ural
- (Italy) Giorgia Sottana
- (United States) Kelsey Plum
- (United States) Kia Vaughn
- (Turkey) Melisa Korkmaz
- (Turkey) Pelin Bilgiç
- (Turkey) Tilbe Şenyürek
- (Turkey) Tuğçe Canıtez
- Head coach: (France) Valérie Garnier

=== 2018/19 ===
Roster

- (Belarus) Anastasiya Verameyenka
- (Turkey) Ayşe Cora
- (Turkey) Birsel Vardarlı (C)
- (France) Bria Hartley
- (Italy) Cecilia Zandalasini
- (Turkey) Esra Ural
- (Italy) Giorgia Sottana
- (United States) Kelsey Plum
- (Czech Republic) Kia Vaughn
- (United States) Kiah Stokes
- (Turkey) Özge Yavaş
- (Turkey) Tilbe Şenyürek
- (Turkey) Tuğçe Canıtez
- Head coach: (France) Valérie Garnier

=== 2019/20 ===
Roster

- (Ukraine) Alina Iagupova
- (Turkey) Ayşe Cora
- (Italy) Cecilia Zandalasini
- (United States) Chelsea Gray
- (United States) Elizabeth Williams
- (Turkey) Esra Ural
- (United States) (Turkey) Kiah Stokes
- (Spain) Laura Nicholls
- (Turkey) Olcay Çakır Turgut
- (Turkey) Sevgi Uzun
- (Turkey) Tuğçe Canıtez (C)
- Head coach: (Spain) Víctor Lapeña

== 2020 Era ==
=== 2020/21 ===
Roster

- (Ukraine) Alina Iagupova
- (Italy) Cecilia Zandalasini
- (United States) Jasmine Thomas
- (United States) Kayla McBride
- (Czech Republic) Kia Vaughn
- (Turkey) (United States) Kiah Stokes
- (Spain) Laura Nicholls
- (Turkey) Olcay Çakır Turgut
- (Germany) Satou Sabally
- (Turkey) Sevgi Uzun
- (Turkey) Tuğçe Canıtez (C)

Head coach: (Spain) Víctor Lapeña

=== 2021/22 ===
Roster

- (Ukraine) Alina Iagupova
- (Turkey) Alperi Onar
- (Sweden) Amanda Zahui B.
- (France) (United States) Bria Hartley
- (United States) Elizabeth Williams
- (United States) Kayla McBride
- (Turkey) (United States) Kiah Stokes
- (Turkey) Manolya Kurtulmuş
- (Turkey) Olcay Çakır Turgut
- (Germany) Satou Sabally
- (Turkey) Tuğçe Canıtez (C)

Head coach: (Spain) Víctor Lapeña

=== 2022/23 ===
Roster

- (Ukraine) Alina Iagupova
- (Turkey) Alperi Onar
- (United States) Breanna Stewart
- (France) (United States) Bria Hartley
- (United States) Courtney Vandersloot
- (Belgium) Emma Meesseman
- (Serbia) Ivana Raca
- (United States) Kayla McBride
- (Turkey) (United States) Kiah Stokes
- (Turkey) Manolya Kurtulmuş
- (Turkey) Merve Aydın
- (Turkey) Olcay Çakır Turgut (C)
- (France) Olivia Époupa
- (Germany) Satou Sabally

Head coach: (Serbia) Marina Maljković

=== 2023/24 ===
Roster

- (Turkey) Alperi Onar (C)
- (Belgium) Emma Meesseman
- (United States) Kayla McBride
- (Turkey) (United States) Kiah Stokes
- (Latvia) Kitija Laksa
- (France) Marième Badiane
- (Montenegro) Marija Leković
- (Turkey) Merve Aydın
- (United States) Natasha Howard
- (Serbia) Nikolina Milić
- (Turkey) Sevgi Uzun
- (Turkey) Tilbe Şenyürek
- (United States) Yvonne Anderson

Head coach: (France) Valérie Garnier

=== 2024/25 ===
Roster

- (Turkey) Alperi Onar (C)
- (United States) Ariel Atkins
- (Belgium) Emma Meesseman
- (France) (United States) Gabby Williams
- (Belgium) Julie Allemand
- (United States) Kayla McBride
- (France) Marième Badiane
- (Montenegro) Marija Leković
- (Serbia) Nikolina Milić
- (Germany) Nyara Sabally
- (Turkey) Olcay Çakır Turgut
- (Turkey) Sevgi Uzun
- (Turkey) Tilbe Şenyürek
- (United States) Tina Charles

Head coach: (France) Valérie Garnier

=== 2025/26 ===
Roster

- (Turkey) Alperi Onar (C)
- (United States) Breanna Stewart
- (Belgium) Emma Meesseman
- (France) (United States) Gabby Williams
- (Turkey) İdil Saçalır
- (France) (Martinique) Iliana Rupert
- (Belgium) Julie Allemand
- (United States) Kayla McBride
- (United States) (Spain) Megan Gustafson
- (Turkey) Meltem Avcı Yılmaz
- (United States) Monique Billings
- (Serbia) Nikolina Milić
- (Turkey) Olcay Çakır Turgut
- (Australia) Rebecca Allen
- (Turkey) Sevgi Uzun
- (United States) (Turkey) Teaira McCowan
- (Turkey) Tilbe Şenyürek

Head coach: (Spain) Miguel Méndez

=== 2026/27 ===
Roster

- (Turkey) Alperi Onar (C)
- (Belgium) Emma Meesseman
- (France) (Martinique) Iliana Rupert
- (Belgium) Julie Allemand
- (Lithuania) Laura Juškaitė
- (United States) Lauren Betts
- (France) Leila Lacan
- (Germany) Luisa Geiselsöder
- (Turkey) Manolya Kurtulmuş
- (France) Nell Angloma
- (Turkey) Olcay Çakır Turgut
- (Turkey) (United States) Quanitra Hollingsworth
- (France) Tima Pouye
- (Serbia) (United States) Yvonne Anderson
- (Turkey) Zeynep Şevval Gül

Head coach: (Turkey) Ahmet Çakı

== See also ==
See also Fenerbahçe (men's basketball) past rosters
