= Women's Basketball Super League =

- Formerly: TBF Turkish Women’s First Basketball League
- Founded: 1980; 46 years ago
- First season: 1980–81
- Country: Turkey
- Confederation: FIBA
- Number of teams: 12
- Level on pyramid: 1
- Relegation to: TKBL
- Domestic cup: Turkish Cup
- Supercup: Presidential Cup
- International cup(s): EuroLeague; EuroCup
- Current champions: Fenerbahçe (20th title)
- Most championships: Fenerbahçe (20 titles)
- TV partners: HT Spor
- Website: tbf.org.tr
- 2026–27 Women's Basketball Super League

The Women's Basketball Super League (Turkish: Kadınlar Basketbol Süper Ligi, KBSL), also known as the Halkbank Women's Basketball Super League for sponsorship reasons, is the top women's professional basketball division of the Turkish women's basketball league system. The league was established in 1980 and is organized by the Turkish Basketball Federation, it replaced the former Turkish Women's Basketball League which ran between 1956 and 1980. There is also a Turkish Women's Basketball League (TKBL), the second level in the Turkish women's basketball league system. The present TKBL should not be confused with the former TKBL, which ran between 1956 and 1980; after the KBSL was founded, the TKBL became a second-tier league.

Fenerbahçe are the most successful team in the competition's history, having won 20 titles to date.

== Competition system ==
The competition is played in two phases: regular season and playoffs. There are 14 teams in the league and they play against each other twice in the league manner, once at their home and the other away. At the end of the season, the top eight teams qualify for the playoff games. The two lowest placed teams of the Super League, ranking 13th and 14th, relegate into the Second League (TKBL). The two top teams of the Second League are promoted to the Super League.

The playoffs follow a tournament format in three rounds for eight teams: quarterfinals, semifinals and finals. The four winners of the quarterfinals advance to the semifinal round. The two victors of the semifinals compete in the final playoff round for the championship title.

== Performance by club ==
Club	Titles	Years won
Fenerbahçe	20	1999, 2002, 2004, 2006, 2007, 2008, 2009, 2010, 2011, 2012, 2013, 2016, 2018, 2019, 2021, 2022, 2023, 2024, 2025, 2026
Galatasaray	13	1988, 1990, 1991, 1992, 1993, 1994, 1995, 1996, 1997, 1998, 2000, 2014, 2015
Beşiktaş	3	1984, 1985, 2005
Middle East Technical University	3	1981, 1982, 1983
Botaş SK	2	2001, 2003
MTA	2	1986, 1987
İstanbul University	1	1989
Near East University	1	2017

== Current clubs (2025–26 season) ==
Club	City	Arena
Beşiktaş	Istanbul	Akatlar Arena
Botaş	Ankara	Ankara Arena
Çanakkale Belediyespor	Çanakkale	Sporcu Gelişim Merkezi
ÇBK Mersin	Mersin	Servet Tazegül Arena
Emlak Konut SK	Istanbul	Başakşehir Sports Complex
Fenerbahçe	Istanbul	Metro Enerji Sports Hall
Galatasaray	Istanbul	Sinan Erdem Dome
Kayseri Basketbol	Kayseri	Kadir Has Spor Salonu
Kocaeli Women's Basketball	Kocaeli	Şehit Polis Recep Topaloğlu Sports Hall
Nesibe Aydın	Ankara	TOBB Sport Hall
Ormanspor	Ankara	M. Sait Zarifoğlu Sports Hall

== Champions ==
Before the Play-off System
Season	Champion	Runner-up	Third Place		Champion's Coach
1980–81	ODTÜ	DSİ Spor	TED Kolejliler		(Turkey) Osman Erverdi
1981–82	ODTÜ	TED Kolejliler	DSİ Spor		(Turkey) Osman Erverdi
1982–83	ODTÜ	TED Kolejliler	Kocaeli Kağıtspor		(Turkey) Kaya Gültekin
1983–84	Beşiktaş	İstanbul Üniversitesi	TED Kolejliler		(Turkey) Fehmi Sadıkoğlu
1984–85	Beşiktaş	M.T.A	TED Kolejliler		(Turkey) Fehmi Sadıkoğlu
1985–86	M.T.A	Beşiktaş	İstanbul Üniversitesi		(Turkey) Erdinç Talu
1986–87	M.T.A	İstanbul Üniversitesi	Beşiktaş		(Turkey) Erdinç Talu
1987–88	Galatasaray	İstanbul Üniversitesi	Lassa		(Turkey) Fehmi Sadıkoğlu
1988–89	İstanbul Üniversitesi	Galatasaray	Yükseliş Koleji		(Turkey) İsmet Kurteşi
1989–90	Galatasaray	İstanbul Üniversitesi	Yükseliş Koleji		(United States) Betsy Bailey
1990–91	Galatasaray	Fenerbahçe	Yükseliş Koleji		(United States) Betsy Bailey
1991–92	Galatasaray	Fenerbahçe	İstanbul Üniversitesi		(United States) Betsy Bailey
1992–93	Galatasaray	Fenerbahçe	BOTAŞ		(United States) Betsy Bailey
After the Play-off System
Season	Champion	Runner-up	Semi-finalists		Champion's Coach
1993–94	Galatasaray	Brisa Spor	BOTAŞ	İstanbul Üniversitesi	(United States) Betsy Bailey
1994–95	Galatasaray	Fenerbahçe	İstanbul Üniversitesi	Brisa Spor	(Turkey) Zafer Kalaycıoğlu
1995–96	Galatasaray	Fenerbahçe	Brisa Spor	BOTAŞ	(Turkey) Zafer Kalaycıoğlu
1996–97	Galatasaray	Brisa Spor	Beşiktaş	İstanbul Üniversitesi	(Turkey) Ekrem Memnun
1997–98	Galatasaray	Brisa Spor	Beşiktaş	Fenerbahçe	(Turkey) Ekrem Memnun
1998–99	Fenerbahçe	Galatasaray	BOTAŞ	Beşiktaş	(Turkey) Göksel Zeren
1999–00	Galatasaray	Fenerbahçe	Brisa Spor	Beşiktaş	(Turkey) Ekrem Memnun
2000–01	BOTAŞ	Fenerbahçe	Beşiktaş	Galatasaray	(Turkey) Ceyhun Yıldızoğlu
2001–02	Fenerbahçe	BOTAŞ	Migros	Erdemir	(Turkey) Zafer Kalaycıoğlu
2002–03	BOTAŞ	Erdemir	Fenerbahçe	Migros	(Turkey) Ceyhun Yıldızoğlu
2003–04	Fenerbahçe	Erdemir	Migros	BOTAŞ	(Turkey) Zafer Kalaycıoğlu
2004–05	Beşiktaş	Fenerbahçe	Mersin BB	Erdemir	(Turkey) Aziz Akkaya
2005–06	Fenerbahçe	Beşiktaş	BOTAŞ	İstanbul Üniversitesi	(Turkey) Zafer Kalaycıoğlu
2006–07	Fenerbahçe	Beşiktaş	Galatasaray	BOTAŞ	(Turkey) Zafer Kalaycıoğlu
2007–08	Fenerbahçe	Galatasaray	TED Kayseri	Beşiktaş	(Turkey) Zafer Kalaycıoğlu
2008–09	Fenerbahçe	Mersin BB	Galatasaray	Samsun Basketbol	(Turkey) Haydar Kemal Ateş
2009–10	Fenerbahçe	Galatasaray	BOTAŞ	Mersin BB	(Turkey) Aydın Uğuz
2010–11	Fenerbahçe	Galatasaray	TED Kayseri	BOTAŞ	(Hungary) László Rátgéber
2011–12	Fenerbahçe	Galatasaray	Kayseri KASKİ	Mersin BB	(Greece) George Dikeoulakos
2012–13	Fenerbahçe	Galatasaray	Kayseri KASKİ	İstanbul Üniversitesi	(Spain) Roberto Íñiguez
2013–14	Galatasaray	Fenerbahçe	BOTAŞ	Kayseri KASKİ	(Turkey) Ekrem Memnun
2014–15	Galatasaray	AGÜ Spor	Adana ASKİ	Fenerbahçe	(Turkey) Ekrem Memnun
2015–16	Fenerbahçe	Hatay BB	AGÜ Spor	Mersin BB	(Greece) George Dikeoulakos
2016–17	Yakın Doğu Üniversitesi	Fenerbahçe	Beşiktaş	Galatasaray	(Turkey) Zafer Kalaycıoğlu
2017–18	Fenerbahçe	Yakın Doğu Üniversitesi	Hatay BB	Çukurova Basketbol	(France) Valérie Garnier
2018–19	Fenerbahçe	Çukurova Basketbol	Galatasaray	BOTAŞ	(France) Valérie Garnier
2019–20	Canceled due to the COVID-19 pandemic in Turkey				
2020–21	Fenerbahçe	Galatasaray	Çankaya Üniversitesi	Nesibe Aydın	(Spain) Víctor Lapeña
2021–22	Fenerbahçe	Çukurova Basketbol	Nesibe Aydın	Ormanspor	(Serbia) Marina Maljković
2022–23	Fenerbahçe	Çukurova Basketbol	Galatasaray	BOTAŞ	(Serbia) Marina Maljković
2023–24	Fenerbahçe	Çukurova Basketbol	Galatasaray	Beşiktaş	(France) Valérie Garnier
2024–25	Fenerbahçe	ÇBK Mersin	Beşiktaş	Galatasaray	(Spain) Miguel Méndez
2025–26	Fenerbahçe	Galatasaray	ÇBK Mersin	Emlak Konut	(Spain) Miguel Méndez

== Notable players ==
Domestic Players

- Birsel Vardarlı
- Sevgi Uzun
- Işıl Alben
- Tuğçe Canıtez
- Melike Bakırcıoğlu
- Olcay Çakır
- Begüm Dalgalar
- Selin Ekiz
- Burcu Erbaş
- Seda Erdoğan
- Duygu Fırat
- Ecem Güler
- Gülşah Gümüşay
- Yasemin Horasan
- Tuğçe İnöntepe
- Naile İvegin
- Şaziye İvegin
- Özge Kavurmacıoğlu
- Ceyda Kozluca
- Şebnem Kimyacıoğlu
- Sariye Kumral
- Tuğçe Murat
- Arzu Özyiğit
- Tuğba Palazoğlu
- Nalan Ramazanoğlu
- Kübra Siyahdemir
- Yasemen Saylar
- Esra Şencebe
- Devran Tanaçan
- Esmeral Tunçluer (Netherlands)
- Gülşah Akkaya
- Aylin Yıldızoğlu
- Nevriye Yılmaz (Bulgaria)
- Nilay Yiğit
- Serap Yücesir
- Müjde Yüksel

European Players

Belarus

- Anastasiya Verameyenka
- Marina Kress
- Sviatlana Volnaya
- Yelena Leuchanka

Belgium

- Emma Meesseman
- Julie Allemand

Bulgaria

- Gergena Baranzova (Turkey)

Croatia

- Korana Longin-Zanze

Czech Republic

- Hana Horáková

Spain

- Alba Torrens

Germany

- Linda Frohlich

France

- Émilie Gomis (Senegal)
- Gabby Williams (United States)
- Iliana Rupert
- Isabelle Yacoubou (Benin)
- Marine Johannès

Hungary

- Andrea Nagy
- Anna Vajda
- Dorka Juhász

Israel

- Shay Doron

Latvia

- Elīna Babkina
- Anete Jēkabsone-Žogota
- Zane Tamane

Lithuania

- Gintarė Petronytė

Poland

- Agnieszka Bibrzycka

Russia

- Elena Baranova
- Epiphanny Prince (United States)

Serbia

- Milica Dabović
- Ivona Jerković
- Ivana Matović
- Ivanka Matić
- Jelena Spirić

Non-European Players

Australia

- Penny Taylor (England)

Canada

- Tammy Sutton-Brown

United States

- Candace Parker
- Matee Ajavon (Liberia)
- Chantelle Anderson
- Seimone Augustus
- Kara Braxton
- Kiesha Brown
- Tamika Catchings
- Tina Charles
- Marissa Coleman
- Monique Currie
- Clarissa Davis
- Diamond DeShields
- Bethany Donaphin
- Katie Douglas
- Summer Erb
- Marie Ferdinand-Harris
- Sylvia Fowles
- Andrea Gardner
- Lindsey Harding
- Laura Harper
- Vanessa Hayden
- Doneeka Hodges
- Ebony Hoffman
- Alexis Hornbuckle
- Katrina McClain Johnson
- Shannon Johnson
- Vickie Johnson
- Erlana Larkins
- Ivory Latta
- Doneeka Lewis
- Stacey Lovelace-Tolbert
- Angel McCoughtry
- Danielle McCulley
- Taj McWilliams-Franklin
- Coco Miller
- Kelly Miller
- Peony Nazario
- Courtney Paris
- Jia Perkins
- Cappie Pondexter
- Nicole Powell
- Sheri Sam
- Katie Smith
- Tangela Smith
- Breanna Stewart
- Andrea Stinson
- Diana Taurasi
- Nikki Teasley
- Barbara Turner
- Tan White
- Sophia Young

== See also ==
- Men's
  - Turkish Men's Basketball League
  - Turkish Men's Basketball Cup
  - Turkish Men's Basketball Presidential Cup
- Women's
  - Turkish Women's Basketball League
  - Turkish Women's Basketball Cup
  - Turkish Women's Basketball Presidential Cup
