= EuroBasket Women 2005 squads =

== Group B ==
=== Turkey ===
Turkey Women's National Basketball Team roster
Players
Coaches

Pos.	No.	Name	Age – Date of birth	Height	Club
	4	Şaziye İvegin-Karslı	–
	5	Birsel Vardarlı	–
	6	Müjde Yüksel	–
	7	Nilay Yiğit	–
	8	Şebnem Kimyacıoğlu	–
	9	Esmeral Tunçluer	–
	10	Aylin Yıldızoğlu	–
	11	Nevriye Yılmaz	–
	12	Serap Yücesir	–
	13	Yasemin Horasan	–
	14	Arzu Bildirir	–
	15	Korel Engin	–

Head coach

- Cem Akdağ

Legend

- (C) Team captain
- nat field describes country
  of last club
  before the tournament
- Age field is age on June 7, 2005

=== Serbia and Montenegro ===
Serbia and Montenegro roster
Players
Coaches

Pos.	No.	Name	Age – Date of birth	Height	Club
	4	Jelena Škerović	–
	5	Milica Dabović	–
	6	Ivana Matović	–
	7	Katarina Manić	–
	8	Monika Veselovski	–
	9	Biljana Stanković	–
	10	Ana Joković	–
	11	Ivanka Matić	–
	12	Iva Perovanović	–
	13	Ines Ajanović	–
	14	Aleksandra Vujović	–
	15	Dara Kovačević	–

Head coach

- Zoran Kovačić

Legend

- (C) Team captain
- nat field describes country
  of last club
  before the tournament
- Age field is age on June 7, 2005
