= Fenerbahçe S.K. (women's basketball) =

Fenerbahçe Tarfin
- 2026–27 Fenerbahçe S.K. (women's basketball) season
- Nickname: Sarı Kanaryalar (The Yellow Canaries); Sarı Lacivertliler (The Yellow-Navy Blues); Potanın Kraliçeleri (The Queens of the Hoop)
- Leagues: WBSL; EuroLeague Women
- Founded: 1954; 72 years ago
- Arena: Metro Enerji Sports Hall
- Capacity: 2,500
- Location: Istanbul, Turkey
- Team colors: Yellow, navy blue
- Main sponsor: Tarfin
- President: Aziz Yıldırım
- Team manager: Arzu Özyiğit
- Head coach: Ahmet Çakı
- Team captain: Alperi Onar
- Championships: 3 European Super Cups; 2023, 2024, 2026; 3 EuroLeague Women; 2023, 2024, 2026; 20 Turkish Basketball Super League; 1999, 2002, 2004, 2006, 2007, 2008, 2009, 2010, 2011, 2012, 2013, 2016, 2018, 2019, 2021, 2022, 2023, 2024, 2025, 2026; 3 Turkish Basketball Championship; 1956, 1957, 1958; 15 Turkish Cups; 1999, 2000, 2001, 2004, 2005, 2006, 2007, 2008, 2009, 2015, 2016, 2019, 2020, 2024, 2026; 14 Turkish Presidential Cups; 1999, 2000, 2001, 2004, 2005, 2007, 2010, 2012, 2013, 2014, 2015, 2019, 2024, 2025; 2 Triple Crowns; 2024, 2026
- Retired numbers: 1 (7)
- Website: fenerbahce.org
Home	Away	Third

Fenerbahçe Women's Basketball (Turkish pronunciation: [feˈnæɾbahtʃe]), also known as Fenerbahçe Tarfin for sponsorship reasons, are the women's basketball department of Fenerbahçe SK, a major Turkish multi-sport club based in Istanbul, Turkey. The team play their matches at the club's own 2,500-seat Metro Enerji Sports Hall.

Founded in 1954, they became the most successful club in domestic competitions, having won a grand total of 52 trophies, and achieved considerable success in European competitions, winning four European titles in a row, an unparalleled feat in Turkish women's basketball history. Fener became EuroLeague winners in the 2022–23, 2023–24 and 2025–26 seasons and were the runners-up on four occasions, in the 2012–13, 2013–14, 2016–17, and 2021–22 seasons. The club reached third place three times in 2015–16, 2020–21, and 2024–25 season. They also became fourth in the 2011–12 and 2014–15 seasons. Furthermore, Fenerbahçe became runners-up in the EuroCup in 2004–05.

In 2023, Fenerbahçe became the first and only Turkish club to win the FIBA Europe SuperCup by crushing France's LDLC ASVEL Féminin on their own homeground with a dominating victory and a point differential of 57, a record in the SuperCup's history. The team managed to repeat this success by beating arch-rivals Beşiktaş in the 2024 edition with a score of 79–63.

Domestically, Fenerbahçe won a record 23 Turkish championship titles (3 in the former Turkish Women's Basketball Championship and 20 in the Turkish Women's Basketball Super League), a record 15 Turkish Cups, and a record 14 Turkish Presidential Cups, among others. The team hold the record of winning 8 season titles in a row on two separate occasions.

Fener scored a perfect season in the 2023–24 season by winning all 35 season games. The team also achieved a historical feat by winning all the other competitions in which they competed in the same season; namely the 2024 Turkish Cup, 2024 Europe SuperCup and 2023–24 EuroLeague. The club continued on to repeat this success again in the 2025–26 season, winning all competitions they competed in.

== Previous names ==
- Fenerbahçe (1954–2019)
- Fenerbahçe Öznur Kablo (2019–2021)
- Fenerbahçe Safiport (2021–2022)
- Fenerbahçe Alagöz Holding (2022–2024)
- Fenerbahçe Opet (2024–2026)
- Fenerbahçe Tarfin (2026–present)

== Players ==
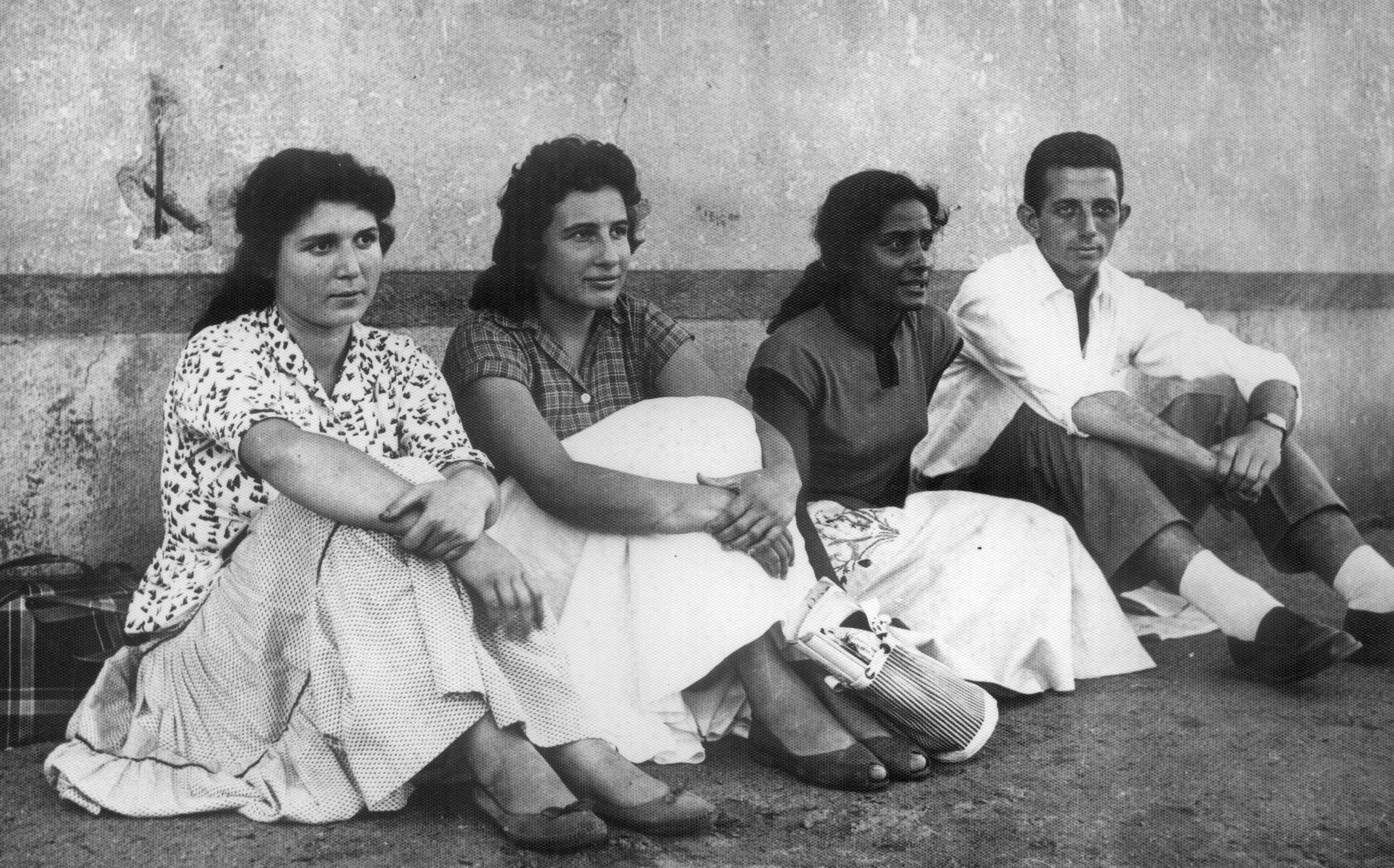
Fenerbahçe women's basketball and volleyball team founders Ayten Salih and İnci Önen with their teammates Süheda Özçiçekçi and their first coach Altan Dinçer.

=== Team roster ===
Fenerbahçe Tarfin roster
Players
Coaches

Pos.	No.	Nat.	Name	Ht.	Wt.	Age
PG	1	(Serbia) (United States)	Anderson, Yvonne	1.75 m (5 ft 9 in)		36 – 8 March 1990
SF	2	(Lithuania)	Juškaitė, Laura	1.87 m (6 ft 2 in)	85 kg (187 lb)	29 – 22 September 1997
G/F	3	(Turkey)	Kurtulmuş, Manolya	1.75 m (5 ft 9 in)		28 – 1 January 1998
PG	4	(Turkey)	Çakır, Olcay	1.80 m (5 ft 11 in)	60 kg (132 lb)	33 – 13 July 1993
SF	9	(Turkey)	Kaplan, Sıla	1.84 m (6 ft 0 in)		21 – 19 November 2004
PG	10	(Turkey)	Onar, Alperi (C)	1.70 m (5 ft 7 in)	57 kg (126 lb)	30 – 2 January 1996
PF	11	(Belgium)	Meesseman, Emma	1.93 m (6 ft 4 in)	87 kg (192 lb)	33 – 13 May 1993
PF	12	(Turkey)	Gül, Zeynep Şevval	1.93 m (6 ft 4 in)		25 – 1 January 2001
F	13	(Turkey)	Vural, Tuana	1.77 m (5 ft 10 in)		19 – 3 April 2007
C	15	(Germany)	Geiselsöder, Luisa	1.93 m (6 ft 4 in)	93 kg (205 lb)	26 – 10 February 2000
PG	22	(Belgium)	Allemand, Julie	1.73 m (5 ft 8 in)	67 kg (148 lb)	30 – 7 July 1996
C	24	(Turkey) (United States)	Hollingsworth, Quanitra	1.98 m (6 ft 6 in)	91 kg (201 lb)	38 – 15 November 1987
F	25	(Turkey)	Baş, Selen	1.80 m (5 ft 11 in)		22 – 1 February 2004
SG	32	(France)	Pouye, Tima	1.75 m (5 ft 9 in)		27 – 7 April 1999
F	33	(France)	Angloma, Nell	1.85 m (6 ft 1 in)		20 – 12 June 2006
C	51	(United States)	Betts, Lauren	2.01 m (6 ft 7 in)	105 kg (231 lb)	22 – 15 October 2003
G	71	(France)	Lacan, Leïla	1.80 m (5 ft 11 in)		22 – 2 June 2004
C		(France) (Martinique)	Rupert, Iliana (injured)	1.94 m (6 ft 4 in)	86 kg (190 lb)	25 – 12 July 2001

Head coach

- (Turkey) Ahmet Çakı

Assistant coach(es)

- (Turkey) Fatih Emre Gezer
- (Turkey) Yağız Sertoğlu
- (Turkey) Semih Akdemir

Team manager

- (Turkey) Arzu Özyiğit

Legend

- (C) Team captain
- (DC) Dual citizenship
- Injured

- Roster
Updated: 10 September 2026

=== Depth chart ===
Pos.	Starting 5	Bench 1	Bench 2	Bench 3	Inactive
C	Lauren Betts	Luisa Geiselsöder	Quanitra Hollingsworth		Iliana Rupert
PF	Emma Meesseman	Laura Juškaitė	Zeynep Şevval Gül
SF	Nell Angloma	Sıla Kaplan	Tuana Vural	Selen Baş
SG	Leïla Lacan	Tima Pouye	Manolya Kurtulmuş
PG	Julie Allemand	Yvonne Anderson	Alperi Onar	Olcay Çakır

=== Team captains ===
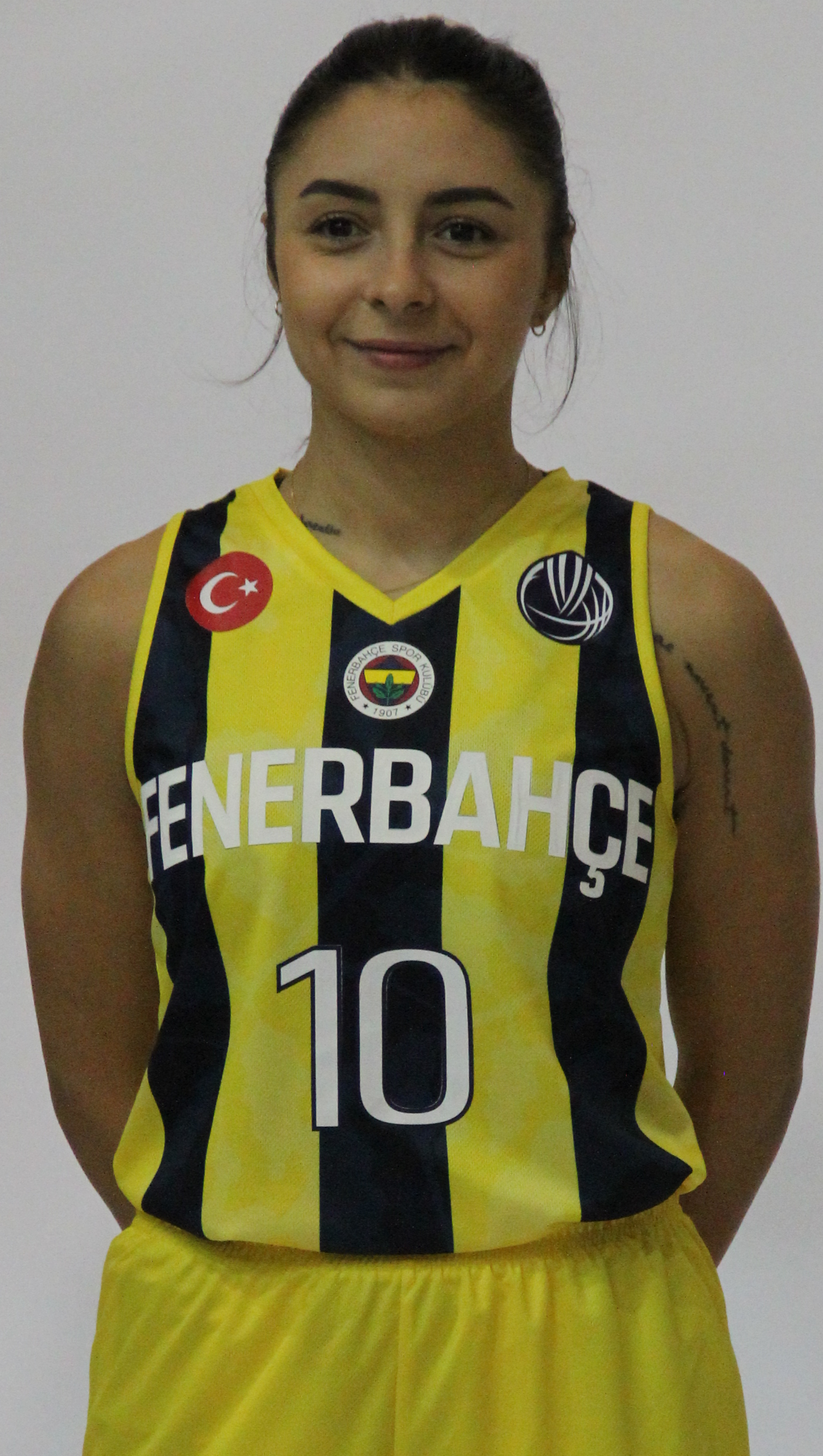
Alperi Onar

This is a list of the senior team's captains in the recent years.

Period	Captain
1996–2006	(Turkey) Serap Yücesir
2006–2009	(Turkey) Nalan Ramazanoğlu
2009–2012	(Turkey) Nevriye Yılmaz
2012–2019	(Turkey) Birsel Vardarlı
2019–2022	(Turkey) Tuğçe Canıtez
2022–2023	(Turkey) Olcay Çakır
2023–present	(Turkey) Alperi Onar

=== Retired numbers ===
Fenerbahçe retired numbers
No	Nat.	Player	Position	Tenure	Ceremony date
7	(Turkey)	Birsel Vardarlı	Point guard	2006–2019	22/12/2019

=== Head coaches ===
Period	Head coach
1955–1960	(Turkey) Önder Dai
196?–1968	(Turkey) Mehmet Baturalp
1980–1985	(Turkey) Yaman Eymür
1987–2000	(Turkey) Göksel Zeren
2000–2009	(Turkey) Zafer Kalaycıoğlu
2009–2010	(Turkey) Haydar Kemal Ateş
2010	(Turkey) Aydın Uğuz
2010–2011	(Hungary) László Rátgéber
2011–2012	(Greece) George Dikeoulakos
2012–2014	(Spain) Roberto Íñiguez
2014–2015	(Poland) Jacek Winnicki
2015–2017	(Greece) George Dikeoulakos
2017–2018	(Turkey) Fırat Okul
2018–2019	(France) Valérie Garnier
2019–2022	(Spain) Víctor Lapeña
2022–2023	(Serbia) Marina Maljković
2023–2025	(France) Valérie Garnier
2025–2026	(Spain) Miguel Méndez
2026–present	(Turkey) Ahmet Çakı

=== Notable players ===
- (Turkey) Alperi Onar (6 seasons: '21-...)
- (Turkey) Arzu Özyiğit (7 seasons: '98-'05)
- (Turkey) Ayşe Cora (4 seasons: '16-'20)
- (Turkey) Begüm Dalgalar (6 seasons: '05-'11)
- (Turkey) Birsel Vardarlı (12 seasons: '07-'19)
- (Turkey) Burcu Erbaş (3 seasons: '06-'09)
- (Turkey) Devran Tanaçan (5 seasons: '02-'04, '09-'12)
- (Turkey) Didem Akın (4 seasons: '98-'02)
- (Turkey) Duygu Fırat (3 seasons: '06-'09)
- (Turkey) Ecem Güler (2 seasons: '10-'12)
- (Turkey) Esmeral Tunçluer (9 seasons: '00-'02, '07-'14)
- (Turkey) Esra Şencebe (4 seasons: '03-'06, '12-'13)
- (Turkey) Esra Ural Topuz (4 seasons: '16-'20)
- (Turkey) Gülşah Akkaya (2 seasons: '95-'96, '99-'00)
- (Turkey) (United States) Korel Engin (1 season: '05-'06)
- (Turkey) Kübra Siyahdemir (3 seasons: '11-'14)
- (Turkey) Melike Bakırcıoğlu (5 seasons: '05-'10)
- (Turkey) Melis Gülcan (2 seasons: '15-'17)
- (Turkey) Meltem Avcı (1 season: '25-'26)
- (Turkey) Müjde Yüksel (2 seasons: '03-'05)
- (Turkey) Nalan Ramazanoğlu (11 seasons: '98-'09)
- (Turkey) (United States) Nevin Nevlin (5 seasons: '08-'13)
- (Turkey) (Bulgaria) Nevriye Yılmaz (7 seasons: '05-'12)
- (Turkey) Nilay Yiğit (3 seasons: '04-'07)
- (Turkey) Olcay Çakır (11 seasons: '10-'16, '19-'21, '24-...)
- (Turkey) Özge Kavurmacıoğlu (2 seasons: '10-'12)
- (Turkey) Pelin Bilgiç (2 seasons: '16-'18)
- (Turkey) (United States) Quanitra Hollingsworth (2 seasons: '13-'15)
- (Turkey) Sariye Kumral (3 seasons: '00-'03)
- (Turkey) Selin Ekiz (3 seasons: '06-'09)
- (Turkey) Serap Yücesir (7 seasons: '98-'03, '04-'06)
- (Turkey) Sevgi Uzun (5 seasons: '19-'21, '23-'26)
- (Turkey) Şaziye İvegin (4 seasons: '04-'07, '10-'11)
- (Turkey) Şükran Albayrak (6 seasons: '00-'06)
- (Turkey) Tilbe Şenyürek (5 seasons: '17-'19, '23-'26)
- (Turkey) (United States) Teaira McCowan (1 season: '25-'26)
- (Turkey) Tuğba Palazoğlu (1 season: '14-'15)
- (Turkey) Tuğçe Canıtez (9 seasons: '13-'22)
- (Turkey) Tuğçe Murat (3 seasons: '06-'09)
- (Turkey) Yasemin Horasan (1 season: '12-'13)
- (Australia) Penny Taylor (3 seasons: '09-'12)
- (Australia) Rebecca Allen (1 season: '25-'26)
- (Bosnia and Herzegovina) (The Bahamas) Jonquel Jones (1 season: '25-'26)
- (Belarus) Anastasiya Verameyenka (6 seasons: '12-'14,'15-'19)
- (Belarus) Sviatlana Volnaya (1 season: '07-'08)
- (Belgium) Emma Meesseman (5 seasons: '22-...)
- (Belgium) Julie Allemand (3 seasons: '24-...)
- (Bulgaria) (Turkey) Gergena Baranzova (3 seasons: '02-'03, '07-'09)
- (Canada) Tammy Sutton-Brown (5 seasons: '06-'11)
- (Croatia) Korana Longin-Zanze (2 seasons: '04-'06)
- (Czech Republic) Hana Horáková (1 season: '10-'11)
- (Czech Republic) Michaela Pavlíčková (1 season: '02-'03)
- (England) Andrea Congreaves (1 season: '98-'99)
- (France) (Senegal) Émilie Gomis (1 season: '08-'09)
- (France) (United States) Gabby Williams (2 seasons: '24-'26)
- (France) (Martinique) (Morocco) Iliana Rupert (1 season: '25-...)
- (France) (Benin) Isabelle Yacoubou (1 season: '13-'14)
- (France) (Chad) Leïla Lacan (1 season: '26-...)
- (France) (Senegal) Marième Badiane (2 seasons: '23-'25)
- (France) (Cameroon) Olivia Époupa (1 season: '22-'23)
- (France) (Martinique) Sandrine Gruda (1 season: '16-'17)
- (Germany) Linda Fröhlich (1 season: '06-'07)
- (Germany) Luisa Geiselsöder (1 season: '26-...)
- (Germany) (The Gambia) (United States) Nyara Sabally (1 season: '24-'25)
- (Germany) (The Gambia) (United States) Satou Sabally (3 seasons: '20-'23)
- (Hungary) (United States) Allie Quigley (2 seasons: '15-'17)
- (Hungary) Andrea Nagy (1 season: '98-'99)
- (Hungary) Anna Vajda (1 season: '10-'11)
- (Italy) Cecilia Zandalasini (3 seasons: '18-'21)
- (Italy) Giorgia Sottana (2 seasons: '17-'19)
- (Latvia) Anete Jēkabsone-Žogota (1 season: '10-'11)
- (Latvia) Elīna Babkina (1 season: '11-'12)
- (Latvia) Ieva Kubliņa (1 season: '12-'13)
- (Latvia) Zane Tamane (1 season: '11-'12)
- (Lithuania) Kamilė Nacickaitė (1 season: '15-'16)
- (Lithuania) Laura Juškaitė (1 season: '26-...)
- (Poland) Agnieszka Bibrzycka (3 seasons: '12-'15)
- (Poland) Ewelina Kobryn (1 season: '15-'16)
- (Russia) Elena Baranova (1 season: '99-'00)
- (Russia) Oksana Zakalyuzhnaya (2 seasons: '00-'02)
- (Serbia) Ana Dabović (1 season: '17-'18)
- (Serbia) Ivana Matović (4 seasons: '10-'14)
- (Serbia) Ivona Jerković (1 season: '04-'05)
- (Serbia) Miljana Bojović (1 season: '14-'15)
- (Serbia) Nikolina Milić (3 seasons: '23-'25, '25-'26)
- (Spain) Anna Cruz (1 season: '19-'20)
- (Spain) (Senegal) Astou Ndour (1 season: '14-'15)
- (Spain) (Curaçao) Laura Nicholls (2 seasons: '19-'21)
- (Sweden) (Ivory Coast) Amanda Zahui B. (1 season: '21-'22)
- (Ukraine) Alina Iagupova (2 seasons: '21-'23)
- (United States) Aerial Powers (1 season: '17-'18)
- (United States) Andrea Gardner (1 season: '05-'06)
- (United States) Angel McCoughtry (4 seasons: '10-'14)
- (United States) Ariel Atkins (1 season: '24-'25)
- (United States) (Turkey) Barbara Turner (1 season: '06-'07)
- (United States) Bethany Donaphin (1 season: '03-'04)
- (United States) Breanna Stewart (2 seasons; '22-'23, '25-'26)
- (United States) (France) Bria Hartley (1 season: '18-'19)
- (United States) Bridgette Gordon (1 season: '99-'00)
- (United States) Candace Parker (1 season: '16-'17)
- (United States) Cappie Pondexter (5 seasons: '06-'08,'11-'14)
- (United States) Chelsea Gray (1 season: '19-'20)
- (United States) Clarissa Davis (2 seasons: '97-'99)
- (United States) Coco Miller (2 seasons: '02-'04)
- (United States) Danielle McCulley (1 season: '01-'02)
- (United States) (Argentina) Diana Taurasi (1 season: '10-'11)
- (United States) (Sierra Leone) Ebony Hoffman (2 seasons: '07-'08, '09-'10)
- (United States) (Nigeria) Elizabeth Williams (2 seasons: '19-'20, '21-'22)
- (United States) Jantel Lavender (2 seasons: '15-'17)
- (United States) Katie Smith (1 season: '08-'09)
- (United States) Kayla McBride (6 seasons: '20-'25, '25-'26)
- (United States) Kelly Miller (2 seasons: '02-'04)
- (United States) Kelsey Plum (2 seasons: '17-'19)
- (United States) (Czech Republic) Kia Vaughn (3 seasons: '17-'19, '20-'21)
- (United States) (Turkey) Kiah Stokes (6 seasons: '18-'24)
- (United States) Lauren Betts (1 season: '26-...)
- (United States) Marissa Coleman (1 season: '15-'16)
- (United States) (Haiti) Marie Ferdinand-Harris (1 season: '04-'05)
- (United States) (Liberia) Matee Ajavon (2 seasons: '08-'10)
- (United States) (Spain) Megan Gustafson (1 season: '25-'26)
- (United States) Monique Billings (1 season: '25-'26)
- (United States) (Sierra Leone) Napheesa Collier (1 seasons; '23-'24)
- (United States) Nicole Powell (3 seasons: '05-'06, '08-'10)
- (United States) Shannon Johnson (1 season: '99-'00)
- (United States) (Croatia) Shavonte Zellous (1 season: '15-'16)
- (United States) Shekinna Stricklen (1 season: '16-'17)
- (United States) Summer Erb (1 season: '03-'04)
- (United States) Tan White (1 season: '05-'06)
- (United States) Tina Charles (2 seasons: '14-'15, '24-'25)
- (United States) Tonya Edwards (1 season: '99-'00)

Italic written players still play for the club.

== Honours ==
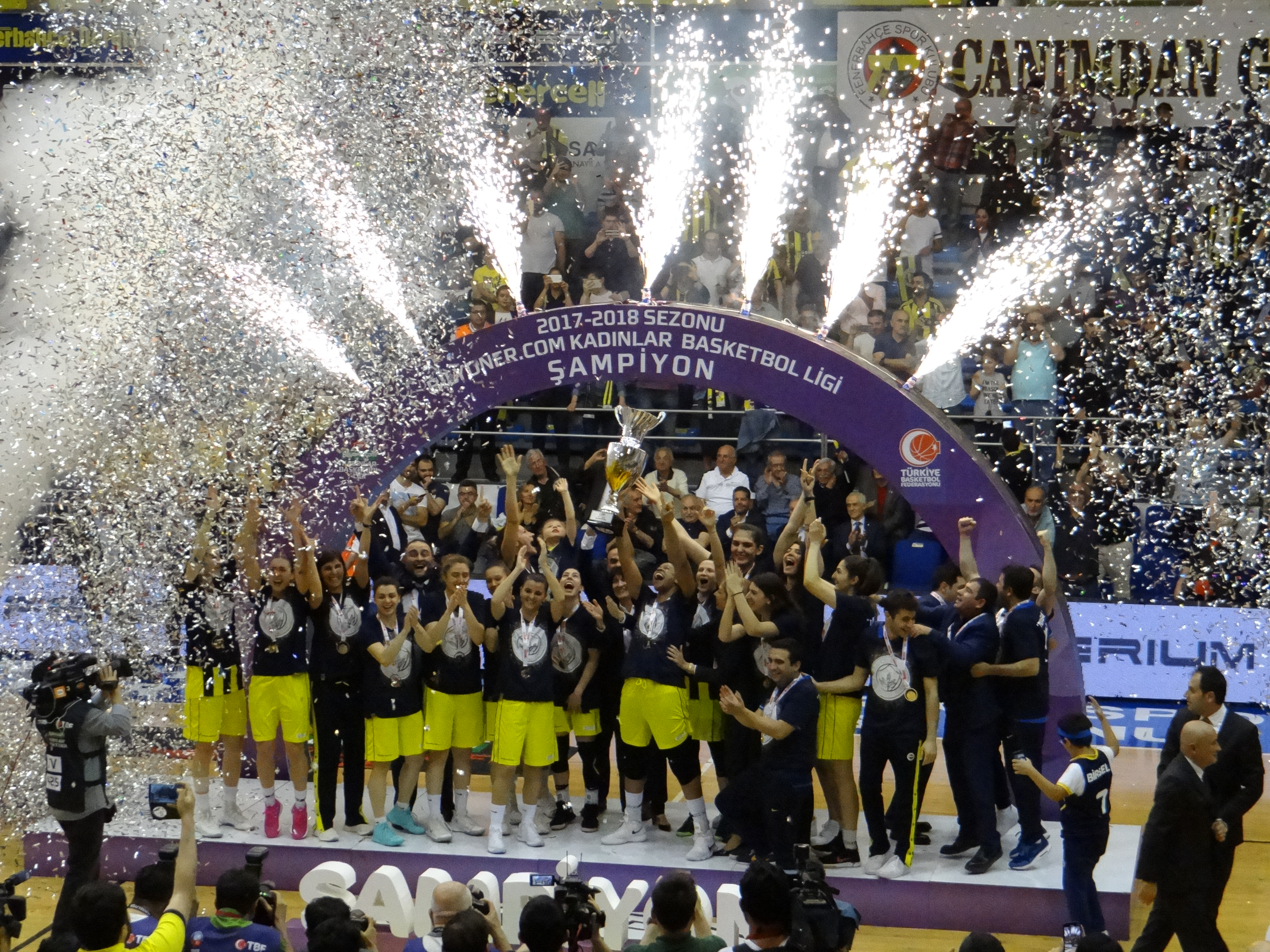
2017–18 Turkish Women's Basketball League championship ceremony

=== European competitions ===
Fenerbahçe S.K.
Medal record

Women's basketball

Representing Fenerbahçe

FIBA Europe SuperCup Women
Gold medal – first place	FIBA Europe SuperCup Women	2023
Gold medal – first place	FIBA Europe SuperCup Women	2024
Gold medal – first place	FIBA Europe SuperCup Women	2026

EuroLeague Women
Gold medal – first place	FIBA EuroLeague Women	2022–23
Gold medal – first place	FIBA EuroLeague Women	2023–24
Gold medal – first place	FIBA EuroLeague Women	2025–26
Silver medal – second place	FIBA EuroLeague Women	2012–13
Silver medal – second place	FIBA EuroLeague Women	2013–14
Silver medal – second place	FIBA EuroLeague Women	2016–17
Silver medal – second place	FIBA EuroLeague Women	2021–22
Bronze medal – third place	FIBA EuroLeague Women	2015–16
Bronze medal – third place	FIBA EuroLeague Women	2020–21
Bronze medal – third place	FIBA EuroLeague Women	2024–25

FIBA EuroCup
Silver medal – second place	FIBA EuroCup Women	2004–05

- FIBA Europe SuperCup Women

Winners (3) (Turkish record): 2023, 2024, 2026

- EuroLeague Women

Winners (3) (Turkish record): 2022–23, 2023–24, 2025–26
Runners-up (4): 2012–13, 2013–14, 2016–17, 2021–22
Third place (3): 2015–16, 2020–21, 2024–25
Fourth place (2): 2011–12, 2014–15

- EuroCup Women

Runners-up (1): 2004–05
Fourth place (1): 2003–04

=== Team honours ===
- Triple Crown

Winnners (2) (Turkish record): 2023–24, 2025–26

=== National competitions ===
- Turkish Basketball Super League

Winners (20) (record): 1998–99, 2001–02, 2003–04, 2005–06, 2006–07, 2007–08, 2008–09, 2009–10, 2010–11, 2011–12, 2012–13, 2015–16, 2017–18, 2018–19, 2020–21, 2021–22, 2022–23, 2023–24, 2024–25, 2025–26
Runners-up (10): 1990–91, 1991–92, 1992–93, 1994–95, 1995–96, 1999–00, 2000–01, 2004–05, 2013–14, 2016–17

- Turkish Basketball Championship (defunct)

Winners (3): 1955–56, 1956–57, 1957–58
Runners-up (1): 1958–59

- Turkish Cup

Winners (15) (record): 1998–99, 1999–00, 2000–01, 2003–04, 2004–05, 2005–06, 2006–07, 2007–08, 2008–09, 2014–15, 2015–16, 2018–19, 2019–20, 2023–24, 2025–26
Runners-up (6): 1994–95, 2009–10, 2011–12, 2012–13, 2013–14, 2021–22

- Turkish Presidential Cup

Winners (14) (record): 1999, 2000, 2001, 2004, 2005, 2007, 2010, 2012, 2013, 2014, 2015, 2019, 2024, 2025
Runners-up (10): 1995, 2002, 2006, 2008, 2009, 2011, 2016, 2017, 2018, 2022

=== Regional competitions ===
- Istanbul Basketball League (defunct)

Winners (6): 1954–55, 1955–56, 1956–57, 1957–58, 1958–59, 1960–61
Runners-up (7): 1959–60, 1962–63, 1963–64, 1964–65, 1965–66, 1966–67, 1967–68

== Season by season ==
Season	Division	Pos.	Pos.	Turkish Cup	Presidential Cup	European competitions		European Super Cup
1998–99	KBSL		Champion	Champion	—	—	—	—
1999–00	KBSL		Runners-up	Champion	Champion	1 EuroLeague Women	GS	—
2000–01	KBSL		Runners-up	Champion	Champion	2 Ronchetti Cup	8F	—
2001–02	KBSL		Champion	Semifinalist	Champion	1 EuroLeague Women	GS	—
2002–03	KBSL	1st	Semifinalist	Semifinalist	Runners-up	2 EuroLeague Women	GS	—
2003–04	KBSL		Champion	Champion	—	2 EuroCup Women	F4	—
2004–05	KBSL		Runners-up	Champion	Champion	2 EuroCup Women	RU	—
2005–06	KBSL		Champion	Champion	Champion	2 EuroCup Women	8F	—
2006–07	KBSL		Champion	Champion	Runners-up	1 EuroLeague Women	QF	—
2007–08	KBSL		Champion	Champion	Champion	1 EuroLeague Women	QF	—
2008–09	KBSL		Champion	Champion	Runners-up	1 EuroLeague Women	QF	—
2009–10	KBSL		Champion	Runners-up	Runners-up	1 EuroLeague Women	QF	—
2010–11	KBSL	2nd	Champion	Semifinalist	Champion	1 EuroLeague Women	QF	—
2011–12	KBSL	1st	Champion	Runners-up	Runners-up	1 EuroLeague Women	F4	—
2012–13	KBSL	1st	Champion	Runners-up	Champion	1 EuroLeague Women	RU	—
2013–14	KBSL	2nd	Runners-up	Runners-up	Champion	1 EuroLeague Women	RU	—
2014–15	KBSL	3rd	Semifinalist	Champion	Champion	1 EuroLeague Women	F4	—
2015–16	KBSL	1st	Champion	Champion	Champion	1 EuroLeague Women	F4	—
2016–17	KBSL	2nd	Runners-up	Semifinalist	Runners-up	1 EuroLeague Women	RU	—
2017–18	KBSL	3rd	Champion	Semifinalist	Runners-up	1 EuroLeague Women	QF	—
2018–19	KBSL	2nd	Champion	Champion	Runners-up	1 EuroLeague Women	QF	—
2019–20	KBSL	CX	Cancelled	Champion	Champion	1 EuroLeague Women	CX	—
2020–21	KBSL	1st	Champion	Runners-up	Cancelled	1 EuroLeague Women	F4	—
2021–22	KBSL	1st	Champion	Runners-up	Cancelled	1 EuroLeague Women	RU	—
2022–23	KBSL	2nd	Champion	Cancelled	Runners-up	1 EuroLeague Women	C	—
2023–24	KBSL	1st	Champion	Champion	Cancelled	1 EuroLeague Women	C	Champion
2024–25	KBSL	1st	Champion	Semifinalist	Champion	1 EuroLeague Women	F4	Champion
2025–26	KBSL	1st	Champion	Champion	Champion	1 EuroLeague Women	C	—
2026–27	KBSL					1 EuroLeague Women		Champion

== Sponsorship and kit manufacturers ==
Period	Kit sponsors
2005–2006	Koç Allianz^{1} ^{2} – Marshall^{3} – Molped^{3}
2006–2007	Aras Cargo^{1} – Marshall^{3} – Molped^{3}
2007–2009	Aras Cargo^{1} – Marshall^{3}
2009–2010	Aras Cargo^{1} – Filli Boya^{3}
2010–2013	Bonus^{1} – Aras Cargo^{2}
2013–2016	Bonus^{1} – Turkuaz Petrol^{2}
2016–2018	Bonus^{1} – Akasya^{2}
2019–2021	Öznur Kablo^{1}
2021–2022	Safiport^{1} – Alagöz Holding^{2} – Getir^{3}
2022–2023	Alagöz Holding^{1} – Yemeksepeti^{2} – Smart^{3}
2023–2024	Alagöz Holding^{1} - Yemeksepeti^{2} - Yükselen^{3} - Gain^{4} - DSV^{5}
2024–2026	Opet^{1}
2026–present	Tarfin^{1}

Period	Kit manufacturers
2000–2023	Fenerium
2023–	Adidas

== See also ==
- Fenerbahçe SK
- Fenerbahçe Basketball
