= Şükran =

Şükran is a unisex Turkish given name. Notable people with the name include:

- Şükran Albayrak (born 1982), Turkish TV presenter and basketball player
- Şükran Moral (born 1962), Turkish artist
- Şükran Ovalı (born 1985), Turkish actress
