= Zafer Kalaycıoğlu =

Turkish basketball coach (born 1965)

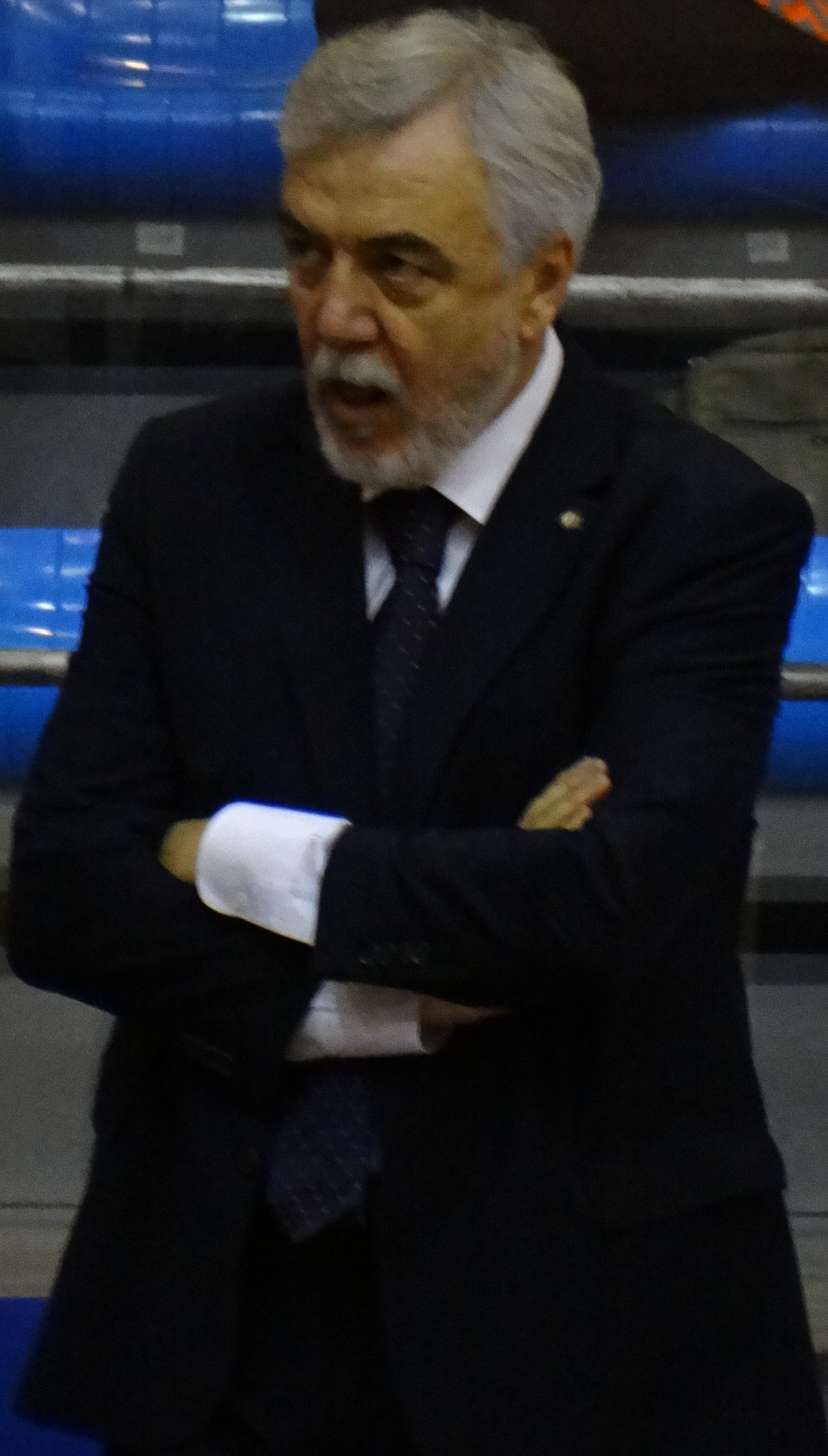
- Kalaycıoğlu in 2018

Personal information
- Born: 1 March 1965 (age 61) Kayseri, Turkey
- Position: Head coach
- Coaching career: 1994–present

Career history

Coaching
- 1994–1996: Galatasaray
- 2000–2009: Fenerbahçe
- 2009–2010: Galatasaray
- 2010–2012: Mersin BB
- 2012: Samsun Basketbol
- 2014–2015: Hatay BB
- 2015–2016: Mersin BB
- 2016–2018: Yakın Doğu Üniversitesi
- 2020–2021: Botaş
- 2022: Çukurova Basketbol

Career highlights
- As head coach: EuroCup Women champion (2017); 8× Turkish Super League champion (1995, 1996, 2002, 2004, 2006, 2007, 2008, 2017); 11× Turkish Cup champion (1995, 1996, 2001, 2004, 2005, 2006, 2007, 2008, 2010, 2017, 2018); 8× Presidential Cup (1994, 1995, 2000, 2001, 2004, 2005, 2007, 2017)

Zafer Kalaycıoğlu (born 1 March 1965 Kayseri, Turkey) is a Turkish professional basketball coach.

== Managing career ==
- 1994–1996 Galatasaray
- 2000–2009 Fenerbahçe
- 2009–2010 Galatasaray
- 2010–2012 Mersin Büyükşehir Belediyespor
- 2012 Samsun Basketbol
- 2014–2015 Hatay Büyükşehir Belediyespor
- 2015–2016 Mersin Büyükşehir Belediyespor
- 2016–2018 Yakın Doğu Üniversitesi
- 2020–2021 Botaş
- 2022 Çukurova Basketbol

== Honors ==
=== Galatasaray ===
- Turkish Championship
  - Winners (2): 1995, 1996
- Turkish Cup
  - Winners (3): 1995, 1996, 2010
- Turkish Presidents Cup
  - Winners (2): 1994, 1995

=== Fenerbahçe ===
- Turkish Championship
  - Winners (5): 2002, 2004, 2006, 2007, 2008
- Turkish Cup
  - Winners (6): 2001, 2004, 2005, 2006, 2007, 2008
- Turkish Presidents Cup
  - Winners (5): 2000, 2001, 2004, 2005, 2007

=== Yakın Doğu Üniversitesi ===
- EuroCup Women
  - Winners (1): 2017
- Turkish Championship
  - Winners (1): 2017
- Turkish Cup
  - Winners (2): 2017, 2018
- Turkish Presidents Cup
  - Winners (1): 2017
