= Duygu =

- Gender: Female
- Language: Turkish

Origin
- Word/name: Turkish
- Meaning: "Sensation", "Emotion", "Affection"

Duygu is a common Turkish given name. It is also a word used in everyday language.

== People ==
=== Given name ===
- Duygu Alıcı (born 2001), Turkish weightlifter
- Duygu Asena (1946–2006), Turkish journalist
- Duygu Aynacı (born 1996), Turkish weightlifter
- Duygu Bal (born 1987), Turkish volleyball player
- Duygu Çete (born 1989), Turkish Paralympic judoka
- Duygu Doğan (born 2000), Turkish rhythmic gymnast
- Duygu Fırat (born 1990), Turkish basketball player
- Duygu Kuzum (born 1983), Turkish-American electrical engineer
- Duygu Özaslan (born 1991), Turkish YouTuber and internet celebrity
- Duygu Ulusoy (born 1987), Turkish alpine skier
- Duygu Yılmaz (born 1988), Turkish footballer
