= Ceyda Kozluca =

Turkish basketball player

Adana ASKİ
- Position: Shooting guard
- League: Turkish Women's Basketball League

Personal information
- Born: May 12, 1984 (age 42) İzmit, Turkey
- Listed height: 5 ft 11 in (1.80 m)

Career information
- Playing career: 2004–present

Career history
- 2000-2004: Migrosspor
- 2004-2005: Beşiktaş Cola Turka
- 2005-2006: Erdemirspor
- 2006-2007: Sakarya As Akyazı
- 2008-2010: Kocaeli BŞB
- 2010-2011: Galatasaray Medical Park
- 2011: → Samsun Basketbol
- 2011-present: Ceyhan Belediye

Ceyda Kozluca (born May 12, 1984 in İzmit, Turkey) is a Turkish professional female basketball player. She is a shooting guard playing for Adana ASKİ SK.

== Career ==
On 21 July 2010, Galatasaray Medical Park announced that Ceyda had joined the team on a one-year contract.

== Awards and achievements ==
- Turkish University National Team -2007
- World University Championships in Bangkok -2007
- Turkish TBB2L Champion -2009
- All-Turkish TBB2L 1st Team -2009

== See also ==
- Turkish women in sports
