= Serap Yücesir =

Turkish basketball player

Fenerbahçe Istanbul (15 seasons: 1990-2003, 2004-2006)
- Position: Power forward

Personal information
- Born: March 18, 1973 (age 53) Kars, Turkey
- Listed height: 6 ft 3 in (1.91 m)
- Listed weight: 165 lb (75 kg)

Career information
- Playing career: 1990–2008

Career history
- 2007-2008: Panküp TED Kayseri College
- 2006-2007: Istanbul University
- 2004-2006: Fenerbahçe Istanbul
- 2003-2004: Galatasaray Medical Park
- 1990-2003: Fenerbahçe Istanbul

Serap Yücesir (*18 March 1973 in Kars, Turkey) is a former Turkish female basketball player. The 1.91 m (6 ft 3 in) national competitor played in the power forward position.

She started playing basketball at the age of 13 with Bayraklıspor in İzmir and later played for Urla Gençlik. Yücesir moved to Fenerbahçe İstanbul in 1990, where she played 13 seasons long. She transferred then to Galatasaray Medical Park, but returned to her previous club after one season. The captain won 12 championship titles. After playing for Istanbul University, she transferred in the season 2007–2008 to Turkish Women's Basketball League team Panküp TED Kayseri College. After ending her active sports career, she serves together with her former teammate Arzu Özyiğit as trainer in a women's basketball school in Kartal, Istanbul.

Yücesir played in the gold medal winning national team at the 2005 Mediterranean Games in Almería, Spain.

Yücesir studied pharmacy, although she had not been able to perform her profession because of basketball, she has now been running her own community pharmacy in Maltepe, Istanbul. She has a son.

== Achievements with Fenerbahçe ==
Turkish Championship

- Winners (4): 1999, 2002, 2004, 2006

Turkish Federation Cup

- Winners (6): 1999, 2000, 2001, 2004, 2005, 2006

Turkish Super Cup

- Winners (5): 1999, 2000, 2001, 2004, 2005

== See also ==
- Turkish women in sports
