= Didem Akın =

Turkish basketball player (born 1971)

Personal information
- Born: May 1, 1971 Ankara, Turkey

Career information
- Playing career: 1985–present

Career history

Playing
- 1985–1990: İTÜ
- 1990–1991: İstanbul Üniversitesi SK
- 1991–1993: Deniz Nakliyat SK
- 1993–1998: Galatasaray Istanbul
- 1998–2002: Fenerbahçe Istanbul

Coaching
- 2005–2007: Fenerbahçe Istanbul
- 2007–2008: Migrosspor
- 2007–2008: U21 National Team
- 2008–2019: Fenerbahçe Istanbul

Didem Akın (born May 1, 1971, in Ankara) is a Turkish former basketball player. She is (pivot/combo guard) Fenerbahce Women's Basketball Team manager.

Known as one of the best female Turkish basketball players of her time, Didem Akın has been working as a basketball team manager since 2005. She won Turkish Women's Basketball League Championship in the total of 14, a large number of Women's Basketball Turkish Cup and won the President Cup as both player and manager during her sports career. Nicknamed “Dido”, Didem played 99 times for Turkey, including the National Women's Basketball Team and Junior National Team and as a player she competed in the EuroLeague Women 7 times.

== Early sports career ==
Didem played basketball for the first time in Ayse Abla Elementary School where her interest in basketball began. She achieved her first success scoring two points in a 2–0 win match. During her educational life in the TED Ankara College, she was eliminated because she was shorter than many of the nominees in the team auditions. Didem did not give up her dream of basketball, and with the support and encouragement of her coach Mustafa Erkoç and his brother Koray Kantarcı, who is a TED Ankara College Sports Club player, she was qualified for the team at her second attempt.
TED Ankara College organized 'Mustafa Erkoç Women's Basketball Tournament”, named after the coach Mustafa Erkoç who holds an important place in Didem's basketball life.

== Professional sports career ==
In 1985, she moved to Istanbul with her family and attended Doğuş High School where she has started her professional basketball life by winning women basketball league championship at Istanbul University Sports Club. That year, the Young National Women's Basketball Team was set up and Didem took part as the captain. While studying at Istanbul Technical University, she participated in Istanbul Technical University Girls Basketball Team and ITU became the winner of the Interuniversity Sport championship for the first time. (and ITU won the championship for the first time at Inter-University Basketball Championships) . She played basketball at Istanbul University Sports Club (İÜSK) for 5 seasons while she was still a student, Deniz Nakliyat Sports Club for 2 seasons, Galatasaray Sports Club for 5 seasons. The rest of her basketball career has continued in Fenerbahce Sports Club. Having played several times in Junior National and National Women's Basketball Teams and competed in European Championships Qualifier, 15. Balkan Championships and Mediterranean Games, The National Team that she had played in and won the silver medal in the Mediterranean Games for the first time. So many times she was named as “point queen”, selected to All-Star, competed in EuroLeague Women. She is one of the rare players who continued to play basketball after giving birth.

== Fenerbahçe career ==
=== As a player ===
The turning point of her career is when Aziz Yıldırım became Fenerbahçe's chairman in 1998. That time, she has been transferred to Fenerbahçe Women's Basketball team in the 1998 -1999 season when Fenerbahçe became champion by beating the Galatasaray hegemony of 8 years and took the 3 cups which are League Cup, Turkish Cup, President Cup. The public Interest in women's basketball also increased with Fenerbahce's first championship. Fenerbahçe'nin bu ilk şampiyonluğu ile kadın basketbol'una olan ilgi arttı.

Her participation in Fenerbahçe during 1998–2002, The Team became champion 2 times, took the Turkish Cup 3 times and President Cup 3 times. She competed in the EuroLeague Women in 2000 and 2002. Didem playing with number 10, was one of the players who scored the most points. She left her career as a player with a jubilee in the 2001–2002 season following an anterior ligamentus injury.

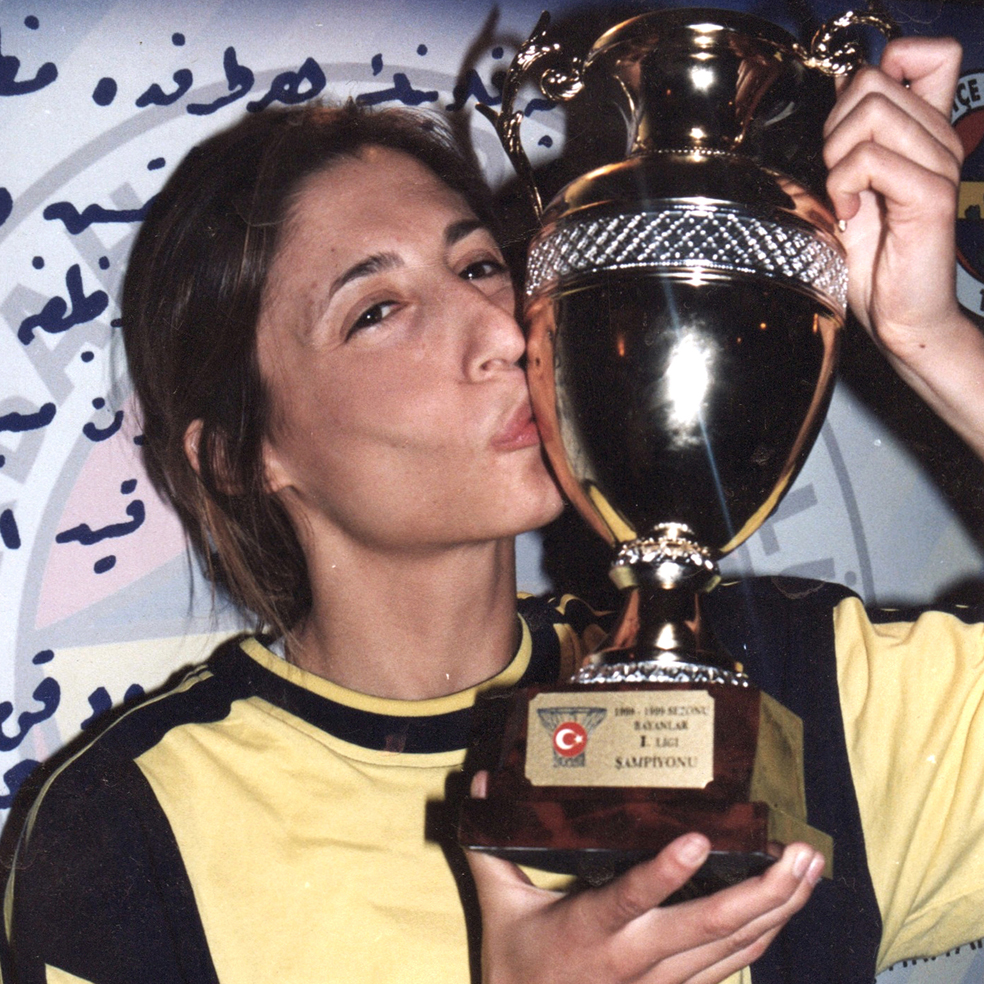
Didem Akın, 1998-99 Season, Fenerbahçe's First Championship

Fenerbahçe Basketball Player Career	League Championship	Turkish Cup	President Cup
1998 - 1999			
1999 - 2000			
2000 - 2001			
2001 - 2002		-	

^{* Championship Cup =, Runner Up =, Third Place =}

=== As manager ===
Didem who could not stay away from basketball for a long time, served as assistant coach in Universiade, World University Summer Games 2005 held in Izmir. Having served as the manager for Fenerbahce during 2005–2006 season and after managing Migros team and the U21 National Team during the 2007–2008 season; Didem has finally got back to her previous post as manager at Fenerbahce; where she still works.

During her management period, Fenerbahçe won the League Championship 5 times, Turkish Cup 3 times and President Cup 2 times. Fenerbahçe also competed in EuroCup once, and in EuroLeague Women 5 times. Fenerbahçe has achieved stuff competing in 2012 EuroLeague Women 8 final series with a fourth degree and still following its path to success.

Fenerbahçe Manager Career	League Championship	Turkish Cup	President Cup	Euroleague Women
2005 - 2006				-
2006 - 2007				-
2008 - 2009				-
2009 - 2010				-
2010 - 2011		-		-
2011 - 2012				-
2012 - 2013				
2013 - 2014				
2014 - 2015	-			-
2015 - 2016				

^{* Championship Cup =, Runner Up =, Third Place =}

== FIBA Europe EuroLeague Women chart ==
EuroLeague Women Statistics belonging to player career.

	Points Per Game	Rebounds Per Game	Assists Per Game
1994	11.3	2.0	1.0
1995	3.3	2.5	0.9
1996	9.2	3.7	1.0
1997	8.5	2.1	1.3
1998	5.4	1.6	0.9
2000	13.4	3.5	2.5
2002	9.7	3.9	2.9

== Management period chart ==
League Results of the teams which she has managed.

Seasons	Team	GP	Win	Loss	Score	Score Against	PTS	Ranking
2011 - 2012	Fenerbahçe Women's Basketball Team	22	19	3	1909	1616	41	1
2010 - 2011	Fenerbahçe Women's Basketball Team	22	20	2	1931	1500	42	1
2009 - 2010	Fenerbahçe Women's Basketball Team	22	22	0	1836	1483	44	1
2008 - 2009	Fenerbahçe Women's Basketball Team	20	17	3	1598	1391	37	1
2007 - 2008	Migrosspor Women's Basketball Team	22	6	16	1525	1674	28	10
2006 - 2007	Fenerbahçe Women's Basketball Team	22	20	2	1728	1395	42	1
2005 - 2006	Fenerbahçe Women's Basketball Team	22	21	1	1765	1435	43	1

== Family life ==
Didem Akın, who is daughter of Muammer Kantarcı and Ayşe Kantarcı has a sister called Zeynep Onur Kantarcı and a brother called Koray Kantarcı. She is married to Raşit Akın with whom she played in the school team during the same time. Her first child Merve was born in 2001, her second child Can, was born in 2003.

== News related Didem Akın ==
- , "F.Bahçe'nin yeni hocası İstanbul'da", Hürriyet, 23/08/2012.
- , "TKBL'de 2012-2013 Sezonu fikstürü belirlendi.", www.fenerbahce.org, 16/08/2012.
- , "Tarih tekerrür etti, Akın Başkana gitti", Hürriyet, 21/04/2012.
- , "Üst üste şampiyonluklarımız tesadüf değil", Hürriyet, 20/04/2012.
- , "Bu kupayı başkanımız Aziz Yıldırım'a armağan ediyoruz", Hürriyet, 20/04/2012.
- , ""Beşiktaş'ı yeneceğiz"", Hürriyet, 27/02/2012.
- , "Çok iyi oynadık", Hürriyet, 2/02/2012.
- , "Abdi İpekçi'ye kazanmak için gidiyoruz", Hürriyet, 07/02/2012.
- , "Pondexter'lı Fener Avenida karşısında", Hürriyet, 31/01/2012.
- , "3'te 3 yapmak istiyoruz", Hürriyet, 01/11/2011.
- , "F.Bahçe'nin kızları bir arada", Hürriyet, 27/08/2011.
- , "Amacımız zoru başarmak", Hürriyet, 11/07/2011.
- , "Fenerbahçe Ülker Arena için tanıtım gezisi yapıldı", Milliyet, 18/04/2012.
- , "Ülker Arena tanıtıldı", Hürriyet, 18/04/2011.
- , "Spor Toto Kadınlar Türkiye Kupası'nda Eşleşmeler belirlendi.", www.gazetegercek.com, 23/02/2011.
- , "Kupa ayrı bir heyecan katacak", Hürriyet, 3/02/2011.
- , "Avantajımızı kullanacağız", Hürriyet, 21/02/2011.
- , "2. maçı da kazanmak istiyoruz", Hürriyet, 03/02/2011.
- , "Umarım biz kazanırız", Hürriyet, 20/10/2010.
- , "Taurasi ve Taylor turp gibiler", Hürriyet, 14/10/2010.
- , "Bu sezon Avrupa'da Fener'in yılı olacak", Hürriyet, 11/10/2010.
- , "F.Bahçe'de imzalar atıldı", Hürriyet, 28/05/2010.
- , "Avrupa'da başarılı olacağız", Hürriyet, 05/05/2010.
- , "Fenerbahçe Bayan Basketbol Takımı'nın hedefi şampiyonluk", Milliyet, 03/05/2010.
- , "Şampiyon kızlar taraftarla buluştu", Hürriyet, 10/05/2009.
- , "Bayanlar All Star-2009 kadroları belli oldu", Hürriyet, 05/01/2009.
- , "F.Bahçe Alman Fröhlich’i aldı", Hürriyet, 12/08/2006.
- , "F.Bahçe Bayan Basketbol Takımı'na Alman oyuncu", Hürriyet, 11/08/2006.
- , "F.Bahçe’ye süper ABD’li", Hürriyet, 29/07/2006.
- , "F.Bahçe Bayan Basketbol Takımı'na Kanadalı pivot", Hürriyet, 25/07/2006.
- , "Dişi Kanarya EuroLeague Women’de", Hürriyet, 19/07/2006.
- , "F.Bahçe: Beşiktaş Cola Turka'yı yenip, ikinci kupayı alacağız", Hürriyet, 03/05/2006.
- , "Fenerli bayanların gözü Avrupa’da", Hürriyet, 04/11/2005.
- , "Fener'in kızları kupaya galibiyetle başlamak istiyor", Hürriyet, 19/10/2005.
- , "Fenerbahçe kısa kısa", Hürriyet, 15/10/2005.
- , "Fenerbahçe'de kupa sevinci yaşanıyor", Hürriyet, 14/10/2005.
