= Birsel Vardarlı =

Turkish basketball player

Birsel Vardarlı Demirmen
- Birsel Vardarlı

Personal information
- Born: July 12, 1984 (age 42) İzmir, Turkey
- Listed height: 5 ft 9 in (1.75 m)
- Listed weight: 143 lb (65 kg)

Career information
- Playing career: 2000–2019
- Position: Point guard

Career history
- 2000–2006: Migrosspor
- 2006–2019: Fenerbahçe

Career highlights
- 10× Turkish Super League champion (2007, 2008, 2009, 2010, 2011, 2012, 2013, 2016, 2018, 2019); 6× Turkish Presidential Cup champion (2007, 2010, 2012, 2013, 2014, 2015); 6× Turkish Cup champion (2007, 2008, 2009, 2015, 2016, 2019)

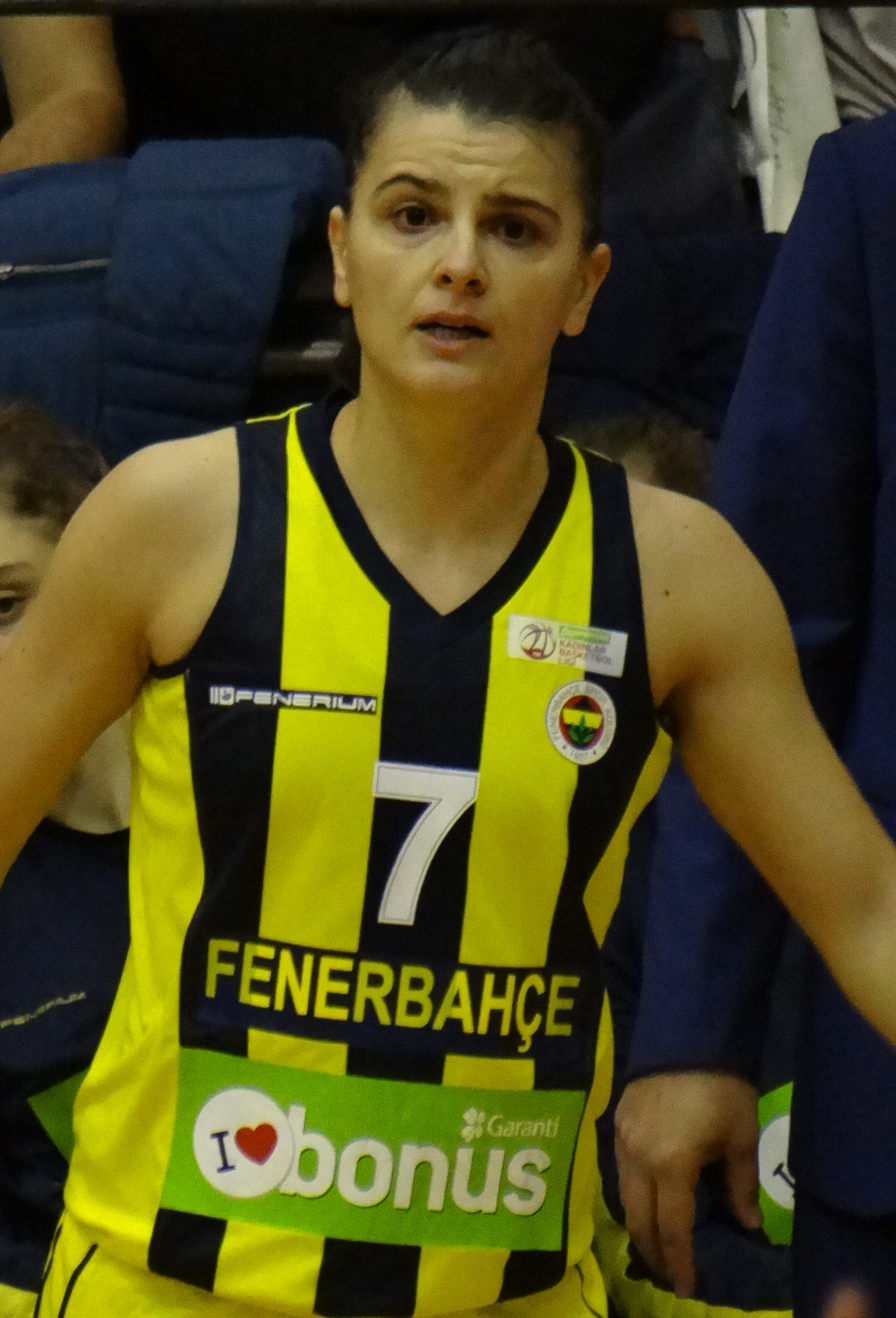
Vardarlı playing for Fenerbahçe

Birsel Vardarlı Demirmen (born Birsel Vardarlı on 12 July 1984) is a Turkish former basketball player. She is considered to be one of the best Turkish female basketball players.

Vardarlı Demirmen played thirteen seasons for Fenerbahçe, where she won twenty-two trophies. She was also the captain of the team for seven seasons. After announcing retirement in June 2019, her number 7 was retired by Fenerbahçe in December 2019.

She made 243 appearances for the Turkey women's national basketball team. She won silver medal in EuroBasket 2011 and bronze in EuroBasket 2013 with the team.

== Early life ==
Vardarlı-Demirmen was born in İzmir. She has two siblings. After playing football, she started playing basketball at the age of 11. She moved from İzmir to Istanbul at the age of 16 to play for Migrosspor.

== Professional career ==
=== Migrosspor ===
Vardarlı-Demirmen started her professional career in Migrosspor and played there for 6 seasons. In her last season at Migrosspor, she contributed to her team playing in the 2006 Turkish Cup final.

=== Fenerbahçe ===
She signed with Fenerbahçe in the summer of 2006. After the 2011–12 season, Nevriye Yılmaz's contract expired and Vardarlı-Demirmen became the captain of Fenerbahçe. She played 675 games for Fenerbahçe in 13 seasons and won 22 trophies, including 10 Turkish Super League, 6 Turkish Cups and 6 Turkish Presidential Cups. She also played in the EuroLeague finals in 2013, 2014 and 2017.

Vardarlı-Demirmen announced her retirement in June 2019.

== Personal life ==
Birsel Vardarlı married Emre Demirmen in June 2014. The couple has a daughter named Lina.

== Honors ==
- Turkish Super League
  - Winners (10): 2007, 2008, 2009, 2010, 2011, 2012, 2013, 2016, 2018, 2019
- Turkish Cup
  - Winners (6): 2007, 2008, 2009, 2015, 2016, 2019
- Turkish Presidential Cup
  - Winners (6): 2007, 2010, 2012, 2013, 2014, 2015

=== Turkey women's national team ===
- EuroBasket 2011: Silver
- EuroBasket 2013: Bronze

== See also ==
- Turkish women in sports
