= Tuğçe İnöntepe =

Turkish basketball player

Tuğçe İnöntepe (born February 15, 1987, in Istanbul, Turkey) is a Turkish female basketball player. The young national plays for Mersin Büyükşehir Belediyesi on loan from Fenerbahçe Istanbul with her team-mate Tuğçe Murat.

She is 172 cm tall and plays as guard and forward. She also played 3 years for Migrosspor on loan.

== See also ==
- Turkish women in sports
