= Kübra Siyahdemir =

Turkish basketball player

Personal information
- Born: 21 June 1986 (age 40) İzmit, Turkey
- Listed height: 5 ft 12 in (1.83 m)
- Listed weight: 143 lb (65 kg)

Career information
- Playing career: 2004–present
- Position: Small forward

Career history
- 2004–2008: Migrosspor
- 2008: Galatasaray
- 2009: Panküp TED Kayseri Koleji
- 2009–2011: Tarsus Belediyesi
- 2011–2015: Fenerbahçe
- 2015–2016: Yakın Doğu Üniversitesil
- 2016-Present: Beşiktaş JK

Kübra İmren Siyahdemir (born 21 June 1986) is a Turkish professional basketball player who played for Tarsus Belediyesi in 2010–11 season and transferred to Turkish Women's Basketball League champion Fenerbahçe Istanbul.

== Honors ==
- (Turkey) Galatasaray
  - Turkish Presidents Cup: 2008
- (Turkey) Fenerbahçe
  - Turkish Championship: 2011–12, 2012–13
  - Turkish Presidents Cup: 2014
  - Turkish Cup: 2015

== See also ==
- Turkish women in sports
