= Jelena Špirić =

Serbian basketball player

Personal information
- Born: August 11, 1983 (age 43) Belgrade, SFR Yugoslavia
- Listed height: 1.91 m (6 ft 3 in)
- Listed weight: 78 kg (172 lb)

Career information
- WNBA draft: 2005: undrafted
- Playing career: –2008
- Position: Small forward

Career history
- Partizan
- Crvena zvezda
- Radivoj Korać
- –2002: Vojvodina
- 2006–2007: Nebraska Cornhuskers
- 2007–2008: Beşiktaş JK
Medals
Women's basketball
Representing Serbia
European U16 Championship
Silver medal – second place	1999 Romania	Team

Jelena Špirić (Serbian Cyrillic: Јелена Шпирић; born 11 August 1983, in Belgrade) is a former Serbian women's basketball player and she played at forward position for the University of Nebraska, Lincoln and national team of Serbia.

== UMass Lowell and Nebraska statistics ==
Legend
GP	Games played	GS	Games started	MPG	Minutes per game
FG%	Field goal percentage	3P%	3-point field goal percentage	FT%	Free throw percentage
RPG	Rebounds per game	APG	Assists per game	SPG	Steals per game
BPG	Blocks per game	PPG	Points per game	**Bold**	Career high

Year	Team	GP	Points	FG%	3P%	FT%	RPG	APG	SPG	BPG	PPG
2002-03	UMass Lowell	30	**268**	**46.7%**	29.8%	72.7%	3.1	**2.3**	**2.5**	**0.3**	**8.9**
2003-04	Colby CC	Not found									
2004-05	Nebraska	**32**	259	46.0%	22.6%	**78.9%**	4.1	1.8	1.7	0.1	8.1
2005-06	Nebraska	Medical redshirt									
2006-07	Nebraska	**32**	199	40.9%	**33.8%**	73.3%	**4.3**	2.2	1.0	0.1	6.2
Career		94	726	44.7%	29.1%	75.6%	3.9	2.1	1.7	0.1	7.7

== Sources ==
- Profile at eurobasket.com
- Profile at huskers.com
