= Devran Tanaçan =

Turkish basketball player

Espérance Sportive Pully
- Position: Center

Personal information
- Born: November 17, 1986 (age 39) Istanbul, Turkey
- Listed height: 6 ft 5 in (1.96 m)
- Listed weight: 198 lb (90 kg)

Career information
- College: Albany Great Danes (2005–2007); Colorado State Rams (2007–2009)
- Playing career: 2002–present

Career history
- 2009–2012: Fenerbahçe
- 2012–2013: Edremit Belediyespor
- 2013–2014: Çankaya Üniversitesi
- 2014–2015: Osmaniye GSK
- 2015–2018: Hatay Büyükşehir Belediyespor
- 2018–2019: CAB Madeira
- 2019: Olimpia CSU Brașov
- 2019–2021: Antalya 07 Basketbol
- 2021: Emlak Konut SK
- 2021–2022: GISA Lions SV Halle
- 2022–2023: Galatasaray
- 2023–: Espérance Sportive Pully

Devran Tanaçan (born November 17, 1986) is a Turkish basketball player for Espérance Sportive Pully. She is 195 cm (6 ft 5 in) tall and weighs 90 kg (200 lb).

== Honors ==
- Turkish Championship
  - Winners (5): 2004, 2009, 2010, 2011, 2012
- Turkish Cup
  - Winners (2): 2004, 2009
- Turkish Presidents Cup
  - Winners (2): 2003, 2010

== Professional career ==
=== Galatasaray ===
On 8 August 2022, she signed with Galatasaray of the Turkish Women's Basketball Super League (TKBL).

As of July 2023, his contract has expired. Galatasaray club said goodbye to the player on July 6, 2023 by publishing a thank you message.
