= Korana Longin-Zanze =

Croatian basketball player

Personal information
- Born: 13 June 1973 (age 53) Zadar, SR Croatia, SFR Yugoslavia
- Listed height: 1.94 m (6 ft 4 in)
- Listed weight: 90 kg (198 lb)

Career information
- Playing career: 1988–2009
- Position: Center

Career history
- 1988–1991: Elemes Šibenik
- 1991–1993: Bari
- 1993–1994: Split
- 1994–1996: Centar Banka Zagreb
- 1996–1998: Jolly JBS Šibenik
- 1998–1999: Galatasaray S.K.
- 2000–2001: Barcelona
- 2003–2006: Fenerbahçe
- 2006–2007: Taranto Cras
- 2007–2009: Beşiktaş JK
Medals
Women's basketball
Representing Croatia
Mediterranean Games
Gold medal – first place	1997 Bari	Team
Gold medal – first place	2001 Tunis	Team

Korana Longin-Zanze (born 13 June 1973) is a retired Croatian female basketball player. She is 194 cm tall and weighs 90 kg. She is a veteran of the Croatian national team and has played for a variety of European clubs.

She was born in Zadar (then SFR Yugoslavia) and has played for the local clubs Elemes Šibenik (1988–1991), KK Split (1993–1994), KK Centar Banka Zagreb (1994–1996), Jolly JBS Šibenik (1996–1998). She spent the 1991-1993 period playing for Bari, Italy.

She went abroad to play for the Turkish club Galatasaray in the 1998–99 season. In the 2000–2001 season she was at Universitat de Barcelona/FC Barcelona Bàsquet in Spain.

Longin-Zanze played for the Turkish club Fenerbahçe İstanbul between 2003 and 2006.

The South Korean club Kumholife Redwings hired her for the 2006 Summer league. In the 2006–2007 season, she played for the Italian club Levoni Taranto. She then transferred to the Turkish side Beşiktaş Cola Turka as center position. She also played for Besiktas in the 2008–2009 season.

She was part of the Croatia women's national basketball team, with whom she played at the Mediterranean Games in Bari in 1997 and Tunis in 2001, and the European women's basketball championship in Poland in 1999. She retired from the national team in 2005.
