= Esmeral Tunçluer =

Dutch-Turkish basketball player

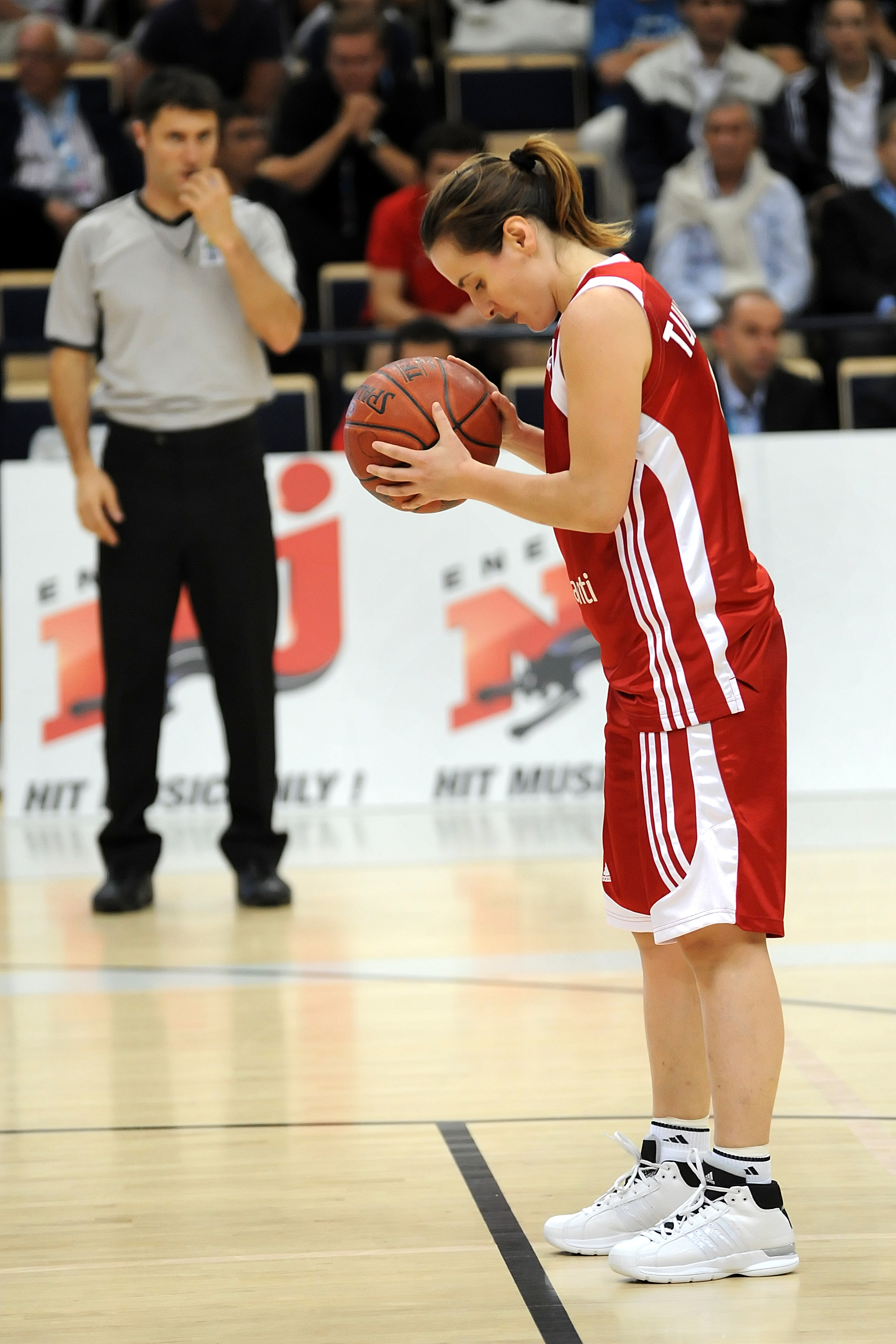

Personal information
- Born: 7 April 1980 (age 46) Ede, Netherlands
- Listed height: 5 ft 8 in (1.73 m)
- Listed weight: 135 lb (61 kg)

Career information
- Playing career: 1997–2014
- Position: Guard

Career history

Playing
- 1997–2000: Beşiktaş
- 2000–2002: Fenerbahçe
- 2002–2004: Botaş SK
- 2004–2005: Beşiktaş
- 2005–2006: Mersin Büyükşehir Belediyespor
- 2006–2007: Beşiktaş
- 2007–2014: Fenerbahçe

Coaching
- 2016–2019: İstanbulgücü
- 2018–2019: Turkish national team (assistant coach)
- 2019–2020: Sakarya Yükseliş

Career highlights
- 10× Turkish Super League champion (2002, 2003, 2005, 2007, 2008, 2009, 2010, 2011, 2012, 2013); 9× Turkish Presidential Cup champion (2000, 2001, 2002, 2003, 2006, 2007, 2010, 2012, 2013); 5× Turkish Cup champion (2001, 2003, 2007, 2008, 2009)

Esmeral Özçelik Tunçluer (born 7 April 1980) is a Dutch-Turkish former basketball player for Fenerbahçe İstanbul. The 1.75 m (5 ft 9 in) national competitor played in the guard position.

She played with Beşiktaş Cola Turka, Fenerbahçe, Botaş Spor and Mersin Metropolitan Municipality. Tunçluer won the Turkish Women's Basketball League champion title with Beşiktaş in 2005 and with Fenerbahçe İstanbul in 2007 to 2011.

Tunçluer was a member of the gold-medal-winning national team at the 2005 Mediterranean Games in Almería, Spain. She played 170 times for the Turkey national women's basketball team.

== See also ==
- Turkish women in sports
