= Nalan Ramazanoğlu =

Turkish basketball player (born 1980)

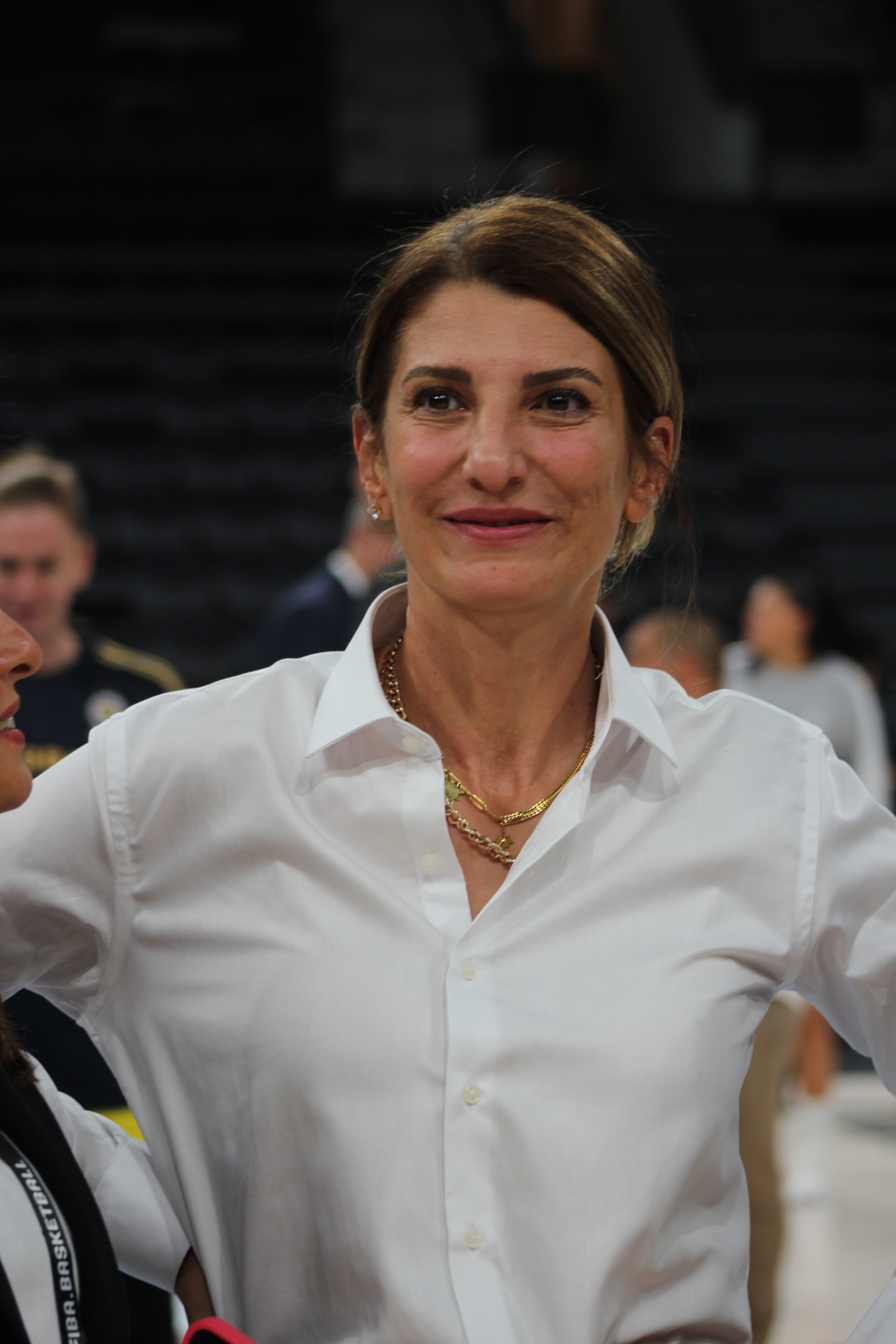

Personal information
- Born: 23 January 1980 (age 46) Rize, Turkey
- Listed height: 6 ft 2 in (1.88 m)
- Listed weight: 165 lb (75 kg)

Career information
- Playing career: 1996–2009
- Position: Forward

Career history
- 1996–2009: Fenerbahçe

Nalan Ramazanoğlu (nee Mete; born 23 January 1980 in Istanbul, Turkey), also known as Nalan Mete Ramazanoğlu, is a retired Turkish professional basketball player. She was captain of Fenerbahçe İstanbul for nine years, and played in the national team. She is 1.87 m tall and weighs 75 kg. She also played in Galatasaray Istanbul. She played for Fenerbahçe İstanbul since 1998 in the senior level. She played seventy times for Turkey national women's basketball team, and was part of the team that won gold medal at the 2005 Mediterranean Games in Almería, Spain.

== Life ==
Nalan Ramazanoğlu, nee Mete, was born 23 January 1980 in Istanbul, Turkey. She was a professional basketball player; she is 1.87 m tall and weighed 75 kg when playing. She began with Fenerbahçe Women's Basketball Team in Istanbul in 1992, because her sister was a friend of the coach. She graduated from the youth team to the A team in 1996. Ramazanoğlu was captain of Fenerbahçe for nine years, and played in the national team. She also played in Galatasaray Istanbul before come back her youth level team Fenerbahçe İstanbul. She was general manager of the Fenerbahce team for the 2023–24 season, resigning from that position in March 2025.

Ramazanoğlu played for Fenerbahçe İstanbul since 1998 in senior level. She played seventy times for Turkey national women's basketball team, including in nine Turkish Cup championships, and six Presidential Cup championships.

Ramazanoğlu was the team leader in free-throw average with 88.9% and second in three-point shot average with 39.2% (after Nicole Powell with 42.3%) in 2005–06 season. Ramazanoğlu was a member of the national team, which won gold medal at the 2005 Mediterranean Games in Almería, Spain. She also played in one Euroleague Women and one FIBA Super Cup match.

== Achievements with Fenerbahçe ==
- Turkish Championship
  - Winners (6): 1999, 2002, 2003, 2004, 2006, 2007
- Turkish Cup
  - Winners (7): 1999, 2000, 2001, 2004, 2005, 2006, 2007
- Turkish presidents Cup
  - Winners (6): 1999, 2000, 2001, 2004, 2005, 2007

== See also ==
- Turkish women in sports
