= Sariye Kumral =

Turkish basketball player

Personal information
- Born: February 23, 1979 (age 47) Samsun, Turkey
- Listed height: 5 ft 10 in (1.78 m)
- Listed weight: 154 lb (70 kg)

Career information
- Playing career: 1994–present
- Position: Shooting guard

Sariye Kumral (born 23 February 1979) is a Turkish professional female basketball player, formally of Galatasaray Medical Park .

Gökçe also played for Beşiktaş (1994-00), Fenerbahçe Istanbul (2000–03), Erdemir (2003–04), Ceyhan Belediyesi (2004–05), Mersin Büyükşehir Belediyesi (2005–06), Beşiktaş Cola Turka (2006–07), Galatasaray Istanbul (2007–08).

== See also ==
- Turkish women in sports
