= Gergana Branzova =

Bulgarian basketball player (born 1976)

Albena Branzova-Dimitrova
Personal information
- Born: 25 July 1976 (age 50) Burgas, Bulgaria

Career information
- College: FIU (1994–1998)
- WNBA draft: 1998: 3rd round, 24th overall pick
- Drafted by: Detroit Shock
- Position: Center

Career history
- 1998: Detroit Shock

Career highlights
- Conference USA Player of the Year (1995); 3x First-team All-Conference USA (1993–1995)
- Stats at Basketball Reference

Gergana 'Gigi' Branzova (Bulgarian: Гергана Брънзова) (born 25 July 1976 in Burgas, Bulgaria) is a former professional basketball player from Bulgaria. She was a member of the Bulgarian National team. She began her career in Nephtohimik, Burgas. Before attending Florida International University in Miami 1994–98, she was voted MVP for the season in 1993-94 while competing for DZU Stara Zagora, Bulgaria under the coaching of Boycho Branzov (her father and a legendary basketball player in Bulgaria). After graduating she was drafted by Detroit Shock WNBA and thus becoming the first Bulgarian player to compete in WNBA. Also played for Reims, France, Asteras Exarhion, Greece, Fenerbahçe İstanbul, Migrosspor, Mersin Metropolitan Municipality B.K., Kosice, Slovakia and Beşiktaş Cola Turka in Turkey where she ended her active career in 2010.

She was married to Turkish basketballer Harun Erdenay in 2003 and divorced in 2014. They have three children. Branzova was diagnosed with multiple sclerosis in 2001.

== Career statistics ==
Legend
GP	Games played	GS	Games started	MPG	Minutes per game	RPG	Rebounds per game
APG	Assists per game	SPG	Steals per game	BPG	Blocks per game	PPG	Points per game
TO	Turnovers per game	FG%	Field-goal percentage	3P%	3-point field-goal percentage	FT%	Free-throw percentage
**Bold**	Career best	°	League leader

=== WNBA ===
Year	Team	GP	GS	MPG	FG%	3P%	FT%	RPG	APG	SPG	BPG	TO	PPG
1998	Detroit	26	0	7.8	.446	.000	.550	1.6	.3	.1	.2	.8	2.7
