= Tuğçe Murat =

Turkish basketball player

No. 35 – Çankaya Üniversitesi
- Position: Center
- League: Turkish Super League

Personal information
- Born: July 9, 1991 (age 35) Konak, İzmir
- Listed height: 6 ft 4 in (1.93 m)

Career information
- Playing career: 2006–present

Career history
- 2006–2010: Fenerbahçe
- 2010–2011: Mersin Büyükşehir Belediyespor
- 2011–2012: Samsun Basket
- 2012–2013: TED Ankara Kolejliler
- 2013–2014: Altay Konak Belediyespor
- 2014–2015: Adana ASKİ
- 2015: Yakın Doğu Üniversitesi
- 2015–2017: Adana ASKİ
- 2017–2018: Çukurova Basketbol
- 2018–2019: Urla Belediyespor
- 2019–2021: Edremit Belediye Gürespor
- 2021: Antalya 07 Basketbol
- 2021–present: Çankaya Üniversitesi

Tuğçe Murat (born July 9, 1991) is a Turkish basketball player for Çankaya Üniversitesi of the Turkish Super League.

Tuğçe Murat was born in 1991 in Istanbul. With the height of 193 cm, Tuğçe plays at the centre position and performed 10 times for Turkey national women's basketball team.

== Honors ==
- Turkish Championship
  - Winners (1): 2007
- Turkish Cup
  - Winners (1): 2007
- Turkish Presidents Cup
  - Winners (1): 2007

== See also ==
- Turkish women in sports
