= Beşiktaş JK (women's basketball) =

Turkish basketball team

Beşiktaş
- Leagues: Turkish Super League
- Founded: 1956
- Arena: BJK Akatlar Arena
- Location: Istanbul, Turkey
- Team colors: Black and White
- President: Serdal Adalı
- Head coach: Ayhan Avcı
- Team captain: Özge Yavaş
- Championships: 3 Turkish Championships: 1984, 1985, 2005; 1 Turkish President's Cup: 2006
- Website: besiktasjk.com.tr
Home	Away

Beşiktaş Women's Basketball Team, or Beşiktaş BOA, as per the sponsorship agreement, is Beşiktaş JK's basketball team competing in the Turkish Super League.

== Roster ==
Beşiktaş Women's Basketball Team roster
Players
Coaches

Pos.	No.	Nat.	Name	Ht.	Age
PG	0	(Croatia)	Lazić, Mihaela	1.68 m (5 ft 6 in)	25 – 20 November 2000
G	1	(Turkey)	Kurtulan, Sedef		17 – 16 June 2009
G	2	(United States)	Simms, Jennie	1.83 m (6 ft 0 in)	32 – 21 April 1994
G	3	(Turkey)	Ülkü, Elif		20 – 12 May 2006
PF	5	(Turkey)	Yıldızhan, Meltem	1.86 m (6 ft 1 in)	27 – 5 August 1999
G	7	(Turkey)	Günay, Ayşegül	1.73 m (5 ft 8 in)	33 – 26 October 1992
PG	8	(Turkey)	Duman, Gülşah	1.77 m (5 ft 10 in)	33 – 19 January 1993
SF	9	(Turkey)	Saçalır, İdil	1.78 m (5 ft 10 in)	24 – 4 January 2002
F	11	(Turkey)	Doğrucu, Elanur		18 – 26 June 2008
F/C	12	(Turkey)	Can, Zeynep		20 – 22 November 2005
C	14	(United States)	Alleyne, Jillian	1.91 m (6 ft 3 in)	32 – 8 September 1994
C	15	(Turkey)	Başaran, Gizem	1.92 m (6 ft 4 in)	34 – 28 September 1992
C	25	(France) (Senegal)	Badiane, Marième	1.93 m (6 ft 4 in)	31 – 24 October 1994
F	99	(United States)	Davis, Rennia	1.85 m (6 ft 1 in)	27 – 24 February 1999

Head coach

- (Turkey) Erman Okerman

Assistant coach(es)

- (Turkey) Rıfat Ömer Petorak

Legend

- (C) Team captain
- Injured

- Roster
Updated: 30 September 2026

== Honours ==
=== National competitions ===
- Turkish Women's Basketball League
  - Champions (3): 1984, 1985, 2005
  - Runners-up (3): 1986, 2006, 2007
- Turkish Cup
  - Runners-up (4): 1997, 2002, 2005, 2007
- Turkish President's Cup
  - Champions (1): 2006
  - Runners-up (2): 2005, 2007

=== International competitions ===
- FIBA EuroCup
  - Final (1): 2024
  - Quarter Finals (3): 2006, 2015, 2016

== Notable players ==
Turkey

- Gülşah Akkaya
- Melike Bakırcıoğlu
- Korel Engin
- İnci Güçlü
- Yasemin Horasan
- Şaziye İvegin
- Şebnem Kimyacıoğlu
- Ceyda Kozluca
- Sariye Kumral
- Arzu Özyiğit
- Tuğba Palazoğlu
- Esra Şencebe
- Yağmur Kübra Taşar
- Tuğba Taşçı
- Esmeral Tunçluer
- Nilay Yiğit
- Müjde Yüksel

Russia

- Ilona Korstin

Nigeria

- Evelyn Akhator

United States

- Kara Braxton
- Laura Harper
- Amber Harris
- Vanessa Hayden
- Khaalia Hillsman
- Ebony Hoffman
- Alexis Hornbuckle
- Jantel Lavender
- Stacey Lovelace-Tolbert
- Cappie Pondexter
- Sheri Sam
- Courtney Vandersloot
- Candice Wiggins

Brazil

- Kelly Santos
- Izi Castro Marques

Bulgaria

- Gergena Baranzova

Croatia

- Sandra Mandir
- Shavonte Zellous
- Korona Longin-Zanze

China

- Li Yueru

Israel

- Shay Doron

Serbia

- Jelena Spirić
- Milica Dabović
- Tijana Krivačević
- Jelena Milovanović
- Jovana Nogić
- Kristina Topuzovic
