= Yasemin Begüm Dalgalar =

Turkish basketball player

Adana ASKİ
- Position: Power forward
- League: TKBL

Personal information
- Born: 8 June 1988 (age 38) Istanbul, Turkey
- Listed height: 6 ft 1 in (1.85 m)

Career information
- Playing career: 2006–present

Career history
- 1998–11: Fenerbahçe
- 2011–12: Tarsus Belediyespor
- 2012–13: Kayseri Kaski
- 2013–15: Beşiktaş
- 2015–16: Adana ASKİ

Yasemin Begüm Dalgalar (born 8 June 1988) is a Turkish female basketball player for Adana ASKİ in the Power forward position. She is 1.85 m (6 ft 1 in) tall and 70 kg (150 lb) weight.

She started her career at Fenerbahçe of Istanbul in 1998 in youth level, and continued in senior level between 2005–2011. She played for Tarsus Belediyespor in the 2011–2012 season before moving to her current team Kayseri Kaski in the 2012–2013 season.

As of July 2012, she has 105 appearances for Turkey women's national basketball team.

She has been in the rooster of the Turkey women's national basketball team that ranked 5th at the 2012 Summer Olympics.

== Honors ==
- Turkish Championship
  - Winners (6): 2006, 2007, 2008, 2009, 2010, 2011
- Turkish Cup
  - Winners (4): 2006, 2007, 2008, 2009
- Turkish Presidents Cup
  - Winners (2): 2007, 2010

== See also ==
- Turkish women in sports
