= Samsun B.K. =

Turkish basketball club

Samsun Basketbol Kulübü
- Leagues: Turkish Women's Basketball League
- Founded: April 4, 2003
- Arena: Yaşar Doğu Spor Salonu
- Location: Samsun, Turkey
- Team colors: Red, White and Black
- President: (Turkey) Ahmet Öztürk
- Head coach: (Turkey) Kaan Artun
- Website: samsunbasketbol.com
| Home | Away |

Samsun B.K. is a women's basketball club based in Samsun, Turkey, founded in 2003.

== Achievements ==
- Turkish Women's Basketball Second League:
  - Runners-up (1): 2007-08

== Technical staff ==
| Name | Job |
|---|---|
| Filiz Yükrük | Manager |
| Kaan Artun | Head Coach |
| Serkan İshakoğlu | Assistant |
| Eyüp Elmas | Masseur |

== 2011-12 Roster ==
Samsun Basketball roster
Players
Coaches

| Pos. | No. | Nat. | Name | Ht. | Wt. |
|---|---|---|---|---|---|
| F | 4 | (Turkey) | Aslan, Cansu | 1.70 m (5 ft 7 in) | 70 kg (154 lb) |
| F | 5 | (Turkey) | Bakırcıoğlu, Melike | 1.90 m (6 ft 3 in) | 76 kg (168 lb) |
| F | 6 | (Turkey) | Çolakoğlu, Deniz | 1.85 m (6 ft 1 in) | 70 kg (154 lb) |
| F | 7 | (Turkey) | Doğan, Gökçe | 1.78 m (5 ft 10 in) | 76 kg (168 lb) |
| G | 8 | (Turkey) | Çelebi, Gülşah | 1.67 m (5 ft 6 in) | 78 kg (172 lb) |
| G | 9 | (United States) | Miller, Coco (C) | 1.78 m (5 ft 10 in) | 60 kg (132 lb) |
| G | 10 | (United States) | Miller, Kelly | 1.75 m (5 ft 9 in) | 76 kg (168 lb) |
| C | 11 | (United States) | Appel, Jayne | 1.93 m (6 ft 4 in) | 78 kg (172 lb) |
| C | 12 | (Turkey) | Murat, Tuğçe | 1.91 m (6 ft 3 in) | 78 kg (172 lb) |
| C | 14 | (Turkey) | Karataş, Gamze | 1.98 m (6 ft 6 in) | 70 kg (154 lb) |
| G | 15 | (Turkey) | Ayyıldız, Aygün | 1.68 m (5 ft 6 in) | 65 kg (143 lb) |
| F | 17 | (United States) | Robbins, Jillian | 1.84 m (6 ft 0 in) | 60 kg (132 lb) |
| F | 20 | (Turkey) | Comba, Doğa | 1.80 m (5 ft 11 in) | 60 kg (132 lb) |

Head coach

- (Turkey) Kaan Artun

Assistant coach(es)

- (Turkey) Serkan İshakoğlu

Legend

- (C) Team captain
- Injured

- Roster
Updated: 2012-03-09
