= Şükran Albayrak =

Turkish presenter

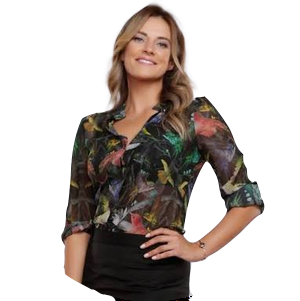

Personal information
- Born: May 12, 1982 (age 44) Kartal, Istanbul, Turkey
- Listed height: 1.86 m (6 ft 1 in)
- Position: Power forward

Career history
- 1992–2006: Fenerbahçe Istanbul

Şükran Albayrak (born 12 May 1982) is a Turkish TV presenter, sport hostess, and retired professional female basketball player.

1.86 m (6 ft 1 in) tall at 74 kg (163 lb), she played as forward for Fenerbahçe Istanbul and Turkish National team between 1992 and 2006.

Albayrak co-presents "Sport Center", a sports news program on Sport TV every weekday evening.

== Sport achievements ==
- Euro Cup Finalist 2004 Italy
- Turkish Championship
  - Winners (4): 2002, 2003, 2004, 2006
- Turkish Cup
  - Winners (5): 2000, 2001, 2004, 2005, 2006
- Turkish Presidents Cup
  - Winners (4): 2000, 2001, 2004, 2005

== See also ==
- Turkish women in sports
