= Müjde Yüksel =

Turkish basketball player

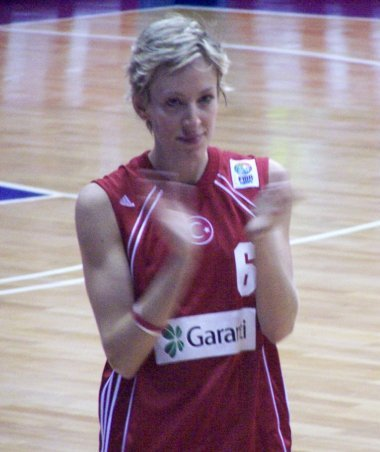

Personal information
- Born: March 9, 1981 (age 45) Kadıköy, Istanbul, Turkey
- Listed height: 5 ft 11 in (1.80 m)
- Position: Forward

Career history
- ?: Migrosspor
- 2003-05: Fenerbahçe Beşiktaş (2005-06); Mersin BŞB (2006-07)
- Turkey
Medals
Women's basketball
Representing Turkey
Mediterranean Games
Gold medal – first place	2005 Almeria	Team
Representing Fenerbahçe
Turkish League
Silver medal – second place	2004-05	Team
Gold medal – first place	2003-04	Team
Turkish Cup
Gold medal – first place	2004-05	Team
Gold medal – first place	2003-04	Team
Turkish President Cup
Gold medal – first place	2003-04	Team

Müjde Yüksel (born 9 March 1981) is a former Turkish female basketball player. The 1.80 m (5 ft 11 in) national competitor played in the forward position.

After Yüksel played for Migrosspor, she transferred to Fenerbahçe Istanbul. She played for two seasons with Fenerbahçe and won one Turkish Women's Basketball League championship, two Turkey Cup and one President's Cup title. Yüksel signed a contract with Beşiktaş J.K. for the 2005–06 season, then transferred to Mersin BŞB for the 2006–07 season.

Yüksel played in the national team, which participated in the 2005 Mediterranean Games in Almería, Spain where she won a gold medal.

Upon earning her PhD from the Isenberg School of Management at the University of Massachusetts Amherst, Yuksel joined the Sawyer Business School at Suffolk University in August 2014 as an assistant professor of Marketing.

In October 2015 Müjde married Clint Palermo in Harvard, Massachusetts. In November 2017 they had a baby.

== See also ==
- Turkish women in sports
