= Ivona Jerković =

Serbian basketball player

Personal information
- Born: July 2, 1984 (age 42) Belgrade, SFR Yugoslavia
- Listed height: 2.00 m (6 ft 7 in)

Career information
- WNBA draft: 2006: undrafted
- Playing career: 2003–2016
- Position: Center

Career history
- 2003–2004: Crvena zvezda
- 2004–2005: Fenerbahçe Istanbul
- 2005–2006: Migrosspor
- 2006–2008: Szolnoki NKK
- 2008–2009: AEL Limassol WBC
- 2009–2010: Partizan
- 2011–2012: Etoile de Voiron
- 2012: Partizan
- 2013: Čelik Zenica
- 2013–2014: CEKK Cegléd
- 2014–2015: Feytiat
- 2015–2016: Renner

Ivona Jerković (born July 2, 1984, in Belgrade, SFR Yugoslavia) is a Serbian women's basketball player. She plays for ŽKK Partizan in Serbia. She also played for Fenerbahçe İstanbul and Migrosspor in Turkey. She is 200 cm and plays center position. With ŽKK Partizan she won national Championship (2009–10).

== Achievements ==
- EuroCup Women - runner-up in 2004 with Fenerbahçe İstanbul
