= Selin Ekiz =

Turkish basketball player

Selin Ekiz (born September 27, 1989 in Istanbul, Turkey) is a Turkish female basketball player. The young national plays for Fenerbahçe as center position. She is 190 cm tall and 80 kg weights. She is playing for Fenerbahçe since 2001 in youth level and since 2006–07 in senior level. She played 60 times for Turkey national women's basketball team.

== Honors ==
- Turkish Championship
  - Winners (1): 2007
- Turkish Cup
  - Winners (1): 2007
- Turkish Presidents Cup
  - Winners (1): 2007

== See also ==
- Turkish women in sports
