= Ivana Matović =

Serbian basketball player

Personal information
- Born: 11 September 1983 (age 43) Šabac, SFR Yugoslavia
- Listed height: 1.97 m (6 ft 6 in)
- Listed weight: 90 kg (198 lb)

Career information
- WNBA draft: 2004: undrafted
- Playing career: 2000–2015
- Position: Center

Career history
- 2000–2003: Vojvodina
- 2003–2004: Usk Blex
- 2004–2007: MKB Euroleasing Sopron
- 2007–2008: WBC Spartak Moscow
- 2008–2010: Lotos Gdynia
- 2010–2014: Fenerbahçe
- 2014–2015: USK Praha

Career highlights
- 1x Yugoslavian Cup (2001); 1x Hungarian League (2007); 1x Hungarian Cups (2007); 1x Russian League (2008); 2x EuroLeague Women (2008, 2015); 2x Polish League (2009, 2010); 1x Polish Cup (2010); 3x Turkish League (2011, 2012, 2013); 3x President Cup (2011, 2012, 2013); 1x Czech League (2015); 1x Czech Cup (2015)
Medals
Women's basketball
Representing Serbia
European U16 Championship
| Silver medal – second place | 1999 Romania | Team |

Ivana Matović (Serbian Cyrillic: Ивана Матовић, born 11 September 1983) is a former Serbian female basketball player. She is 197 cm and plays center position. She also played for Vojvodina, Usk Blex, MKB Euroleasing Sopron, WBC Spartak Moscow, Lotos Gdynia, Fenerbahçe and again USK Praha.

She played 25 points, 15 rebounds and 6 assists per game in Euroleague'05 season and she played with 15.5 points 4.9 rebounds and 2.5 assists per game in Euroleague'09.
