= Sviatlana Volnaya =

Belarusian basketball player (born 1979)

Sviatlana Volnaya (en: Svetlana Volnaya) (born April 4, 1979, in Minsk, Belarusian Soviet Socialist Republic, USSR) is a Belarusian women's former basketball player. She played for Dynamo Moscow as guard and forward position. She is 187 cm tall and weighs 72 kg. She also played for Virginia (U.S.) in college basketball.

== Virginia statistics ==
Ratios
Year	Team	GP	FG%	3P%	FT%	RBG	APG	BPG	SPG	PPG
1998-99	Virginia	29	34.9%	26.3%	70.0%	3.40	0.97	0.21	0.45	6.40
1999-00	Virginia	33	44.5%	42.9%	75.5%	4.06	1.55	0.21	0.30	13.85
2000-01	Virginia	31	43.4%	45.0%	63.9%	4.00	1.60	0.30	0.70	12.60
Career		93	41.9%	39.4%	70.1%	3.85	1.38	0.24	0.49	11.12

Totals
Year	Team	GP	FG	FGA	3P	3PA	FT	FTA	REB	A	BK	ST	PTS
1998-99	Virginia	29	65	186	21	80	35	50	99	28	6	13	186
1999-00	Virginia	33	149	335	54	126	105	139	134	51	7	10	457
2000-01	Virginia	31	132	304	49	109	78	122	125	49	9	23	391
Career		93	346	825	124	315	218	311	358	128	22	46	1034
