= Burcu Erbaş =

Turkish basketball player

Burcu Erbaş (born 8 January 1988 in Istanbul, Turkey) is a Turkish female basketball player. The young national plays for Fenerbahçe İstanbul as point guard. Burcu is 175 cm tall and 60 kg weights. She is playing for Fenerbahçe İstanbul since 2000 in youth level and since 2006-07 in senior level. She played 35 times for Turkey national women's basketball team.

== Honors ==
- Turkish Championship
  - Winners (1): 2007
- Turkish Cup
  - Winners (1): 2007
- Turkish Presidents Cup
  - Winners (1): 2007

== See also ==
- Turkish women in sports
