= Ecem Güler =

Turkish basketball player

Emel Ecem Güler
No. 8 – Fenerbahçe Istanbul
- Position: Power Forward
- League: Turkish Women's Basketball League-Euroleague Women

Personal information
- Born: January 16, 1992 (age 34) Soma, Turkey
- Listed height: 6 ft 2 in (1.88 m)
- Listed weight: 167 lb (76 kg)

Career information
- Playing career: 2010–present

Emel Ecem Güler (born 16 January 1992 in Soma, Turkey) is a Turkish basketball player. She plays for Fenerbahçe İstanbul as both small and power forward position. She is 187 cm tall and 75 kg weights. She has played for Fenerbahçe İstanbul since 2004 in youth level and since 2010 in senior level.

== Honors ==
- Turkish Championship (3): 2010–11, 2011–12, 2012–13
- Turkish Presidents Cup (1): 2010

== See also ==
- Turkish women in sports
