= Melike Bakırcıoğlu =

Turkish basketball player (born 1987)

Melike Bakırcıoğlu (born February 24, 1987, in Istanbul, Turkey) is a Turkish female basketball player. She plays for Fenerbahçe as forward position. She is 190 cm tall and weighs 79 kg. She is playing for Beşiktaş Cola Turka and also played between 2005 and 2010 for Turkey national women's basketball team.

Bakırcıoğlu is the designated double teaming player on defense.

== Honors ==
- Turkish Championship
  - Winners (3): 2006, 2007, 2009 with Fenerbahçe
- Turkish Cup
  - Winners (3): 2006, 2007, 2009 with Fenerbahçe
- Turkish Presidents Cup
  - Winners (2): 2007, 2009 with Fenerbahçe

== See also ==
- Turkish women in sports
