= Duygu Fırat =

Turkish basketball player

Duygu Fırat (born July 15, 1990 in İzmir, Turkey) is a Turkish female basketball player. The young national plays for Fenerbahçe İstanbul as center position. Duygu is 188 cm tall and weighs 74 kg. She currently plays for Burhaniye Belediyespor on loan from Fenerbahçe İstanbul where she played since 2005. She also played for Bucaspor in youth level. She played 37 times for Turkey national women's basketball team.

== Honors ==
- Turkish Championship
  - Winners (1): 2007
- Turkish Cup
  - Winners (1): 2007
- Turkish Presidents Cup
  - Winners (1): 2007

== See also ==
- Turkish women in sports
