= Arzu Özyiğit =

Turkish basketball player

Fenerbahçe
- Position: General manager
- League: Women's Basketball Super League; Euroleague Women

Personal information
- Born: October 16, 1972 (age 54) Tarsus, Mersin, Turkey
- Listed height: 1.88 m (6 ft 2 in)

Career information
- Playing career: 1984–2013

Career history
- Botaş Spor
- Fenerbahçe
- Galatasaray
- Beşiktaş
- Istanbul University
- Panserraikos
- Mersin BB
- Canik Belediyespor
- Samsun

Arzu Özyiğit Bildirir (born Arzu Özyiğit; October 16, 1972) is a Turkish female former basketball player. The 1.88 m (6 ft 2 in) international competitor played in the center position. She is currently serving as a general manager of Fenerbahçe.

Özyiğit started basketball in 1984 with Botaş Spor in Adana. After she played with several clubs like İÜSK, Fenerbahçe, Galatasaray, Özyiğit moved to the Greek club Panserraikos in 2002. Özyiğit returned home and played for Fenerbahçe, Kocaeli BB and Beşiktaş.

She was a 5-time member of the Turkish girls’ and 190-time member of the Turkish women's national team, a record in the country. Özyiğit won 18 champion titles with her clubs. She is the first player in Turkey to win the championship with four different teams, the latest one with Beşiktaş as the team's captain in 2005. She transferred to the Mersin BB team in July 2005.

Özyiğit was also captain of the gold medal-winning team at the 2005 Mediterranean Games in Almería, Spain. She could not play the final match because of complications with her pregnancy, but the team dedicated the medal to her.

In 2009, she became trainer of the Turkey under-20 women's national basketball team that competed at the 2009 FIBA U20 championships held in Gdynia, Poland. She served in 2010 also as trainer at a basketball school in Kartal, Istanbul. In November 2010, Arzu Özyiğit returned to active sports transferring to Canik Belediyespor, a club in Samsun Province, which plays in the Turkish Women's Basketball Second League (TKB2L).

In June 2003, she married businessman Mustafa Bildirir. He owns an Italian cuisine restaurant "Pulcinella" at Kozyatağı neighborhood in Kadıköy district of Istanbul, where she also helps out whenever she finds time.

== See also ==
- Turkish women in sports
