= Nevriye Yılmaz =

Turkish basketball player (born 1980)

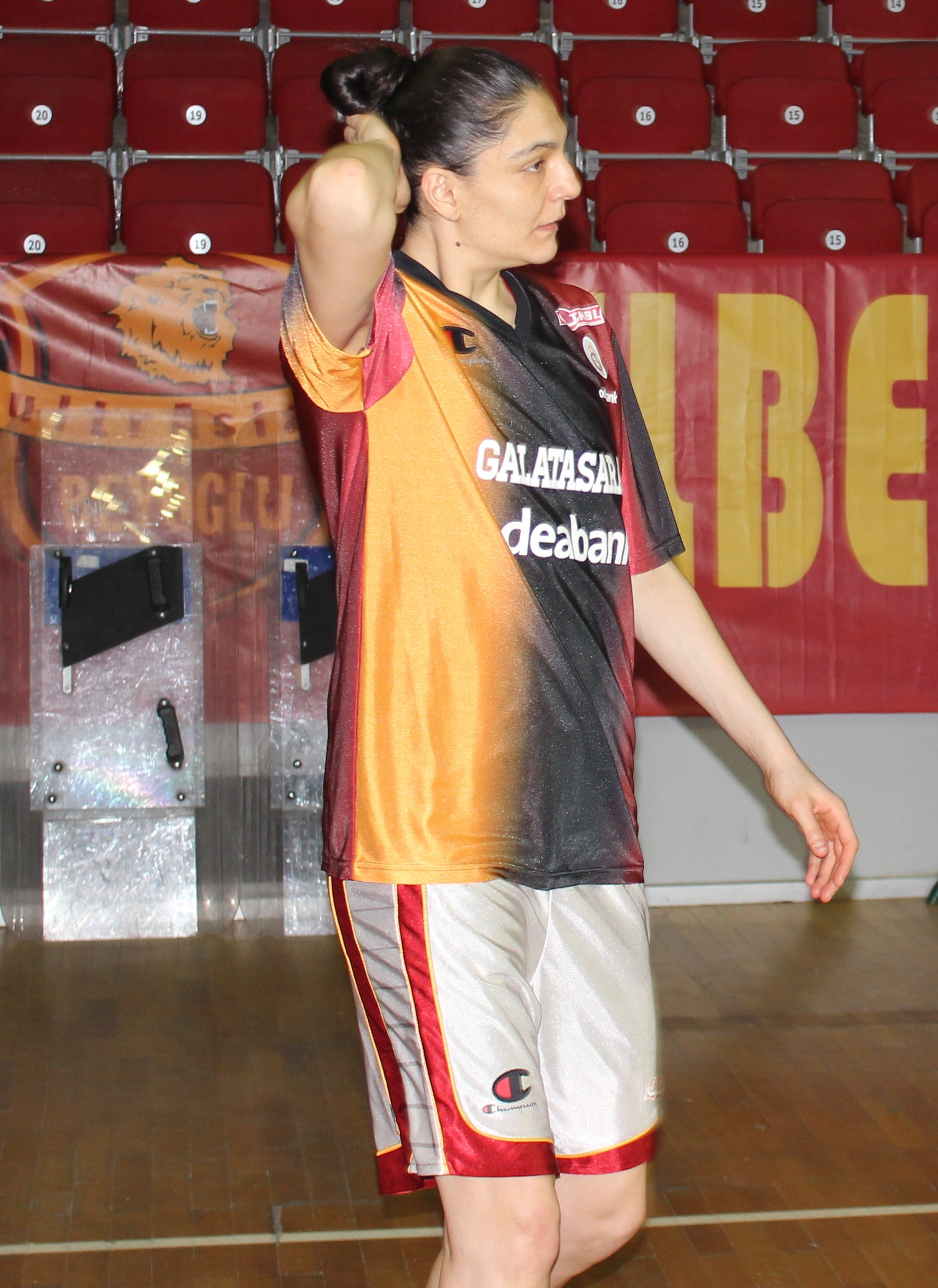

Personal information
- Born: 16 June 1980 (age 46) Plovdiv, Bulgaria
- Listed height: 6 ft 4 in (1.93 m)
- Listed weight: 192 lb (87 kg)

Career information
- Playing career: 1997–2016
- Position: Center

Career history
- 1997–1999: I.U.S.B.K.
- 1999–2001: Galatasaray
- 2001–2002: Apollon Ptolemaida
- 2002: Academic Plovdiv
- 2002–2003: Termini Imerese
- 2003–2004: La Spezia Basket
- 2004–2005: Pool Comense Como
- 2005–2012: Fenerbahçe
- 2012–2016: Galatasaray
- Stats at Basketball Reference

Nevriye Yılmaz (pronounced [ˈnevɾiːye jɯɫˈmaz]; born 16 June 1980) is a Turkish retired basketball player. Yılmaz, who grew up in Bulgaria in a Turkish family, moved to Istanbul, Turkey with her parents when she was nine years old.

In 1997, she won the World High School Basketball Championship with Boğaziçi Lisesi.

== Career in Europe ==
She began her basketball career with I.U.S.B.K. (1997–99) and then she played Galatasaray (1999–01) where she won her first Turkish Championship in Turkey.

She moved first to the Greek team Apollon Ptolemaida (2001–02) then later to the Bulgarian team Academic Plovdiv (2002). Yılmaz moved then to Italy to play for Termini Imerese (2002–03), La Spezia Basket (2003–04) and Pool Comense Como (2004–05).

== WNBA ==
Yılmaz is the first Turkish woman to play in the Women's National Basketball Association (WNBA). In 1999, she participated in the Charlotte Sting's training camp, but was released before the season started. In 2000, she attended the training camp for the now-defunct Miami Sol, but was also released prior to the start of the regular season. Then in 2003, Yılmaz signed a free agent contract with the Phoenix Mercury and played five games for them. The following year, 2004, she played seven games for the San Antonio Silver Stars.

== Fenerbahçe ==
In 2005, she returned home to play in Fenerbahçe Istanbul.

She won 2005 Europe Cup Ribaund Quenn and 2007 EuroLeague Women All-Star player honor.

== Galatasaray ==
On 6 July 2012, she signed a two-year contract with Galatasaray Women’s Basketball Team.

Yılmaz officially announced her retirement from active sport on 24 October 2016.

She won Euroleague cup 2014 with Galatasaray.

== National team ==
She participated at the 2005 Mediterranean Games in Almería, Spain and won a gold medal with Turkey national women's basketball team.

With more than 180 games (188 games until 7 December 2007) played Yılmaz the most capped national player or Turkey. She was a student in the Sports Academy at the Istanbul University.

She participated London Olympic games 2012 and Rio Olympic games 2016.

== Honors ==
- Turkish Championship
  - Galatasaray Istanbul: 2000, 2014, 2015
  - Fenerbahçe Istanbul: 2006, 2007, 2008, 2009, 2010, 2011, 2012
- Turkish Cup
  - Fenerbahçe Istanbul: 2006, 2007, 2008, 2009
- Turkish Presidents Cup
  - Fenerbahçe Istanbul: 2007, 2010
- EuroLeague Women
  - Galatasaray Istanbul: 2014
- Triple Crown
  - Galatasaray Istanbul: 2014
- Eurobasket
  - National team: 2011 (silver)
  - All tournament team, Eurobasket Women 2011

== See also ==
- Turkish women in sports
