= 2024 Turkish Women's Basketball Presidential Cup =

Fenerbahçe	ÇBK Mersin
65	64
- Date: 4 December 2024
- Venue: Ankara Arena, Ankara
- MVP: (Belgium) Emma Meesseman

The 2024 Turkish Women's Basketball Presidential Cup (Turkish: 2024 Kadınlar Basketbol Cumhurbaşkanlığı Kupası) was the 29th edition of the Turkish Women's Basketball Presidential Cup. The game was played between Fenerbahçe Opet, champions of the 2023–24 Women's Basketball Super League and winners of the 2024 Turkish Women's Basketball Cup, and ÇBK Mersin, runners-up of the 2023–24 Women's Basketball Super League and the 2024 Turkish Women's Basketball Cup.

Fenerbahçe won 13 championship in their 22 final appearance, while ÇBK Mersin played a total of 3 President's Cup finals and won only 1 of them.

== Venue ==
Ankara	2024 Turkish Women's Basketball Presidential Cup (Turkey)
Ankara Arena	2024 Turkish Women's Basketball Presidential Cup (Turkey)
Capacity: 10,400	2024 Turkish Women's Basketball Presidential Cup (Turkey)

== Match details ==
=== Summary ===
Fenerbahçe Opet and ÇBK Mersin met for the third time in the final of the Presidential Cup. Fenerbahçe had won the final in 2019, while ÇBK Mersin claimed the title in 2022. The game was officiated by referees Ali Serkan Emlek, Yücel Çilingir, and Orkun Yurttaş. The match was played at the Ankara Arena and was broadcast live on TRT Spor and the official YouTube channel of the Turkish Basketball Federation. The trophy was presented to Fenerbahçe captain Alperi Onar and the Final MVP Emma Meesseman, who secured Fenerbahçe's 13th Presidential Cup title, by the Minister of Youth and Sports Osman Aşkın Bak and the President of the Turkish Basketball Federation Hidayet Türkoğlu.

=== Details ===
4 December 2024	Fenerbahçe Opet	65–64	ÇBK Mersin	Ankara
19:00 TRT (UTC+3)	Scoring by quarter: 22–21, 18–11, 11–10, 14–22
	Pts: Meesseman 20; Rebs: Meesseman 9 Asts: Meesseman 7 PIR: Meesseman 33	Boxscore	Pts: Howard 21; Rebs: Howard, McCowan 10; Asts: Fauthoux 6 PIR: McCowan 16	Arena: Ankara Arena; Referees: Ali Serkan Emlek, Yücel Çilingir, Orkun Yurttaş

Starters:			Pts	Reb	Ast
PG	22	(Belgium) Julie Allemand	0	2	5
SG	2	(Turkey) Sevgi Uzun	13	3	4
SF	5	(United States) Gabby Williams	4	4	4
PF	11	(Belgium) Emma Meesseman	20	9	7
C	31	(United States) Tina Charles	15	6	0
Reserves:					
PF	1	(Turkey) Sudenur Akarpa	DNP		
PG	4	(Turkey) Olcay Çakır	7	2	2
F	9	(Turkey) İdil Saçalır	DNP		
PG	10	(Turkey) Alperi Onar	6	2	1
PF	15	(Turkey) Tilbe Şenyürek	0	2	0
SG	24	(Turkey) Selen İrem Baş	DNP		
PG	30	(Turkey) Ayşe Yılmaz	0	0	0
Head coach:
(French Federation of Basketball) Valérie Garnier

Fenerbahçe	Mersin

Fenerbahçe	Statistics	Mersin
20/42 (47.6%)	2-pt field goals	22/49 (44.9%)
5/21 (23.8%)	3-pt field goals	2/17 (11.8%)
10/11 (90.9%)	Free throws	14/25 (56%)
4	Offensive rebounds	16
26	Defensive rebounds	27
30	Total rebounds	43
23	Assists	20
13	Turnovers	14
6	Steals	11
3	Blocks	3
21	Fouls	17

2024 Turkish Women's Presidential Cup champions
Fenerbahçe Opet
(13th title)

Starters:			Pts	Reb	Ast
PG	1	(United States) Yvonne Anderson	8	5	5
SG	4	(France) Marine Fauthoux	3	5	6
SF	10	(Turkey) Sinem Ataş	6	1	3
PF	00	(United States) Natasha Howard	21	10	1
C	12	(France) Iliana Rupert	7	9	1
Reserves:					
PG	0	(Turkey) Asena Yalçın	0	0	0
SF	3	(Turkey) Feride Şevval Akalan	5	3	3
SF	7	(Turkey) Eslem Güler	DNP		
SG	9	(Turkey) Derin Yaya	0	0	0
SF	13	(Turkey) Ayşenaz Harma	DNP		
C	15	(Turkey) Teaira McCowan	14	10	1
SF	22	(Turkey) Şuğranur Hatice Sönmez	DNP		
Head coach:
(Spanish Basketball Federation) Víctor Lapeña
