= 2025 Turkish Women's Basketball Presidential Cup =

Fenerbahçe	ÇBK Mersin
104	77
- Date: 3 December 2025
- Venue: Ankara Arena, Ankara
- MVP: (Belgium) Emma Meesseman
- Attendance: 2,907

The 2025 Turkish Women's Basketball Presidential Cup (Turkish: 2025 Kadınlar Basketbol Cumhurbaşkanlığı Kupası) was the 30th edition of the Turkish Women's Basketball Presidential Cup. The game was played between Fenerbahçe Opet, champions of the 2024–25 Women's Basketball Super League, and Çimsa ÇBK Mersin, winners of the 2025 Turkish Women's Basketball Cup and runners-up of the 2024–25 Women's Basketball Super League.

Fenerbahçe won 14 championship in their 23 final appearance, while ÇBK Mersin played a total of 4 President's Cup finals and won only 1 of them.

== Venue ==
Ankara	2025 Turkish Women's Basketball Presidential Cup (Turkey)
Ankara Arena	2025 Turkish Women's Basketball Presidential Cup (Turkey)
Capacity: 10,400	2025 Turkish Women's Basketball Presidential Cup (Turkey)

== Match details ==
=== Summary ===
Fenerbahçe Opet and Çimsa ÇBK Mersin met for the fourth time in the final of the Presidential Cup. Fenerbahçe had won the final in 2019 and 2024, while ÇBK Mersin claimed the title in 2022. The game was officiated by referees Aydın Karaçam, Ozan Gönen, and Yiğit Gönültaş. The match played at the Ankara Arena and broadcast live on HT Spor.

ÇBK Mersin fell behind 14–7 in the first four minutes, unable to contain the scoring of Fenerbahçe's Kayla McBride, but closed the opening quarter ahead 25–22 thanks to Julie Vanloo's effective play, in a period where both teams combined for nine three-pointers. Seeking to increase the tempo, the Mersin side extended the lead to seven points (36–29) in the first three minutes of the second quarter with contributions from Esra Ural and Sinem Ataş off the bench. Although Fenerbahçe began to utilize the paint more effectively through Emma Meesseman and Alperi Onar after a timeout and managed to level the score, ÇBK Mersin responded through baskets by Kennedy Burke and Julie Vanloo and went into halftime with a 47–45 advantage.

With the score tied at 54–54 midway through the third quarter, Fenerbahçe capitalized on their opponent's declining shooting efficiency. Behind Teaira McCowan's interior scoring, Meesseman's mid-range baskets and McBride's perimeter shooting, they produced a 19–5 run and entered the final period leading 73–59.

In the fourth quarter, Fenerbahçe continued to build momentum, with Alperi Onar facilitating the offense and Meesseman and McBride sustaining the scoring. As ÇBK Mersin struggled to keep pace, the margin widened steadily, and Fenerbahçe secured a 104–77 victory.

Emma Meesseman led Fenerbahçe with 23 points, 7 rebounds and 6 assists, earning the Most Valuable Player award. The trophy was presented to Fenerbahçe captain Alperi Onar and Kayla McBride, by the Minister of Youth and Sports Osman Aşkın Bak and the President of the Turkish Basketball Federation Hidayet Türkoğlu.

=== Details ===
3 December 2025	Fenerbahçe Opet	104–77	Çimsa ÇBK Mersin	Ankara
19:00 TRT (UTC+3)	Scoring by quarter: 22–25, 23–22, 28–12, 31–18
	Pts: McBride 24; Rebs: Meesseman 7 Asts: Onar 9 PIR: Meesseman 34	Boxscore	Pts: Burke, Vanloo 18; Rebs: Ural 7 Asts: Vanloo 5 PIR: Burke 22	Arena: Ankara Arena; Attendance: 2,907; Referees: Aydın Karaçam, Ozan Gönen, Yiğit Gönültaş

Starters:			Pts	Reb	Ast
PG	10	(Turkey) Alperi Onar	16	1	9
SG	2	(Turkey) Sevgi Uzun	7	2	3
SF	21	(United States) Kayla McBride	24	3	6
PF	11	(Belgium) Emma Meesseman	23	7	6
C	12	(France) Iliana Rupert	10	6	4
Reserves:					
PF	1	(Turkey) Sudenur Akarpa	DNP		
PG	4	(Turkey) Olcay Çakır	0	0	1
F	5	(France) Gabby Williams	3	0	0
SF	13	(Turkey) Tuana Vural	0	0	0
C	14	(Turkey) Teaira McCowan	18	6	0
PG	22	(Belgium) Julie Allemand	3	0	3
F	24	(Turkey) Selen Baş	0	0	0
Head coach:
(Spanish Basketball Federation) Miguel Méndez

Fenerbahçe	Mersin

Fenerbahçe	Statistics	Mersin
30/39 (76.9%)	2-pt field goals	17/36 (47.2%)
11/27 (40.7%)	3-pt field goals	13/37 (35.1%)
11/12 (91.7%)	Free throws	4/9 (44.4%)
2	Offensive rebounds	14
23	Defensive rebounds	19
25	Total rebounds	33
32	Assists	17
8	Turnovers	15
3	Steals	4
4	Blocks	1
14	Fouls	16

2025 Turkish Women's Presidential Cup champions
Fenerbahçe Opet
(14th title)

Starters:			Pts	Reb	Ast
PG	3	(Turkey) Manolya Kurtulmuş	14	3	2
SG	35	(Belgium) Julie Vanloo	18	4	5
SF	22	(United States) Kennedy Burke	18	5	3
PF	12	(Lithuania) Laura Juškaitė	8	6	4
C	5	(Turkey) Ayşenaz Harma	2	2	1
Reserves:					
PF	1	(Turkey) Sevgi Tonguç	0	2	0
PG	6	(Turkey) Büşra Akbaş	2	1	0
PG	8	(Turkey) Asena Yalçın	0	0	0
SG	10	(Turkey) Sinem Ataş	7	3	0
C	18	(Germany) Luisa Geiselsöder	DNP		
SG	23	(Turkey) Eslem Güler	0	0	0
C	33	(Turkey) Esra Ural	8	7	2
Head coach:
(Hellenic Basketball Federation) George Dikeoulakos
