= Emma Meesseman =

Belgian basketball player (born 1993)

- Meesseman in 2026

No. 11 – Fenerbahçe
- Position: Power forward
- League: Turkish Super League; EuroLeague Women

Personal information
- Born: 13 May 1993 (age 33) Ypres, Belgium
- Listed height: 6 ft 4 in (1.93 m)
- Listed weight: 191 lb (87 kg)

Career information
- WNBA draft: 2013: 2nd round, 19th overall pick
- Drafted by: Washington Mystics
- Playing career: 2009–present

Career history
- 2009–2012: Blue Cats Ieper
- 2009–2012: Lotto Young Cats
- 2012–2014: ESB Villeneuve-d'Ascq
- 2013–2020: Washington Mystics
- 2014–2016: WBC Sparta&K
- 2016–2022: UMMC Ekaterinburg
- 2022: Chicago Sky
- 2025: New York Liberty
- 2022–present: Fenerbahçe

Career highlights
- Olympics Basketball Tournament All-Star Five (2020, 2024); 2× FIBA EuroBasket Champion, MVP, All-Star Team (2023, 2025); FIBA Europe Under-18 Championship Champion, MVP, All-Tournament Team (2011); WNBA champion (2019); WNBA Finals MVP (2019); 2× WNBA All-Star (2015, 2022); 7× EuroLeague champion (2016, 2018, 2019, 2021, 2023, 2024, 2026); 6× FIBA Europe SuperCup Women winner: 2016, 2018, 2019, 2023, 2024, 2026; FIBA Europe SuperCup Women MVP: 2026; 3× Euroleague MVP (2023, 2024, 2025); Euroleague Final Four MVP (2018); 6× All-EuroLeague First Team (2020, 2021, 2023, 2024, 2025, 2026); 3× Triple Crown (2019, 2024, 2026); 4× Turkish Super League champion (2023, 2024, 2025, 2026); 2× Turkish Super League Finals MVP (2023, 2025); 2× Turkish Cup winner (2024, 2026); 2× Turkish Cup Final MVP (2024, 2026); 2× Turkish Presidential Cup champion (2024, 2025); 2× Turkish Presidential Cup MVP (2024, 2025); 6× Russian National League champion (2016–2021); 2× Russian Cup winner (2017, 2019); Belgian National League champion (2012); Belgian National League championship MVP (2012); FIBA Europe Young Women's Player of the Year (2011)
- Stats at WNBA.com
- Stats at Basketball Reference

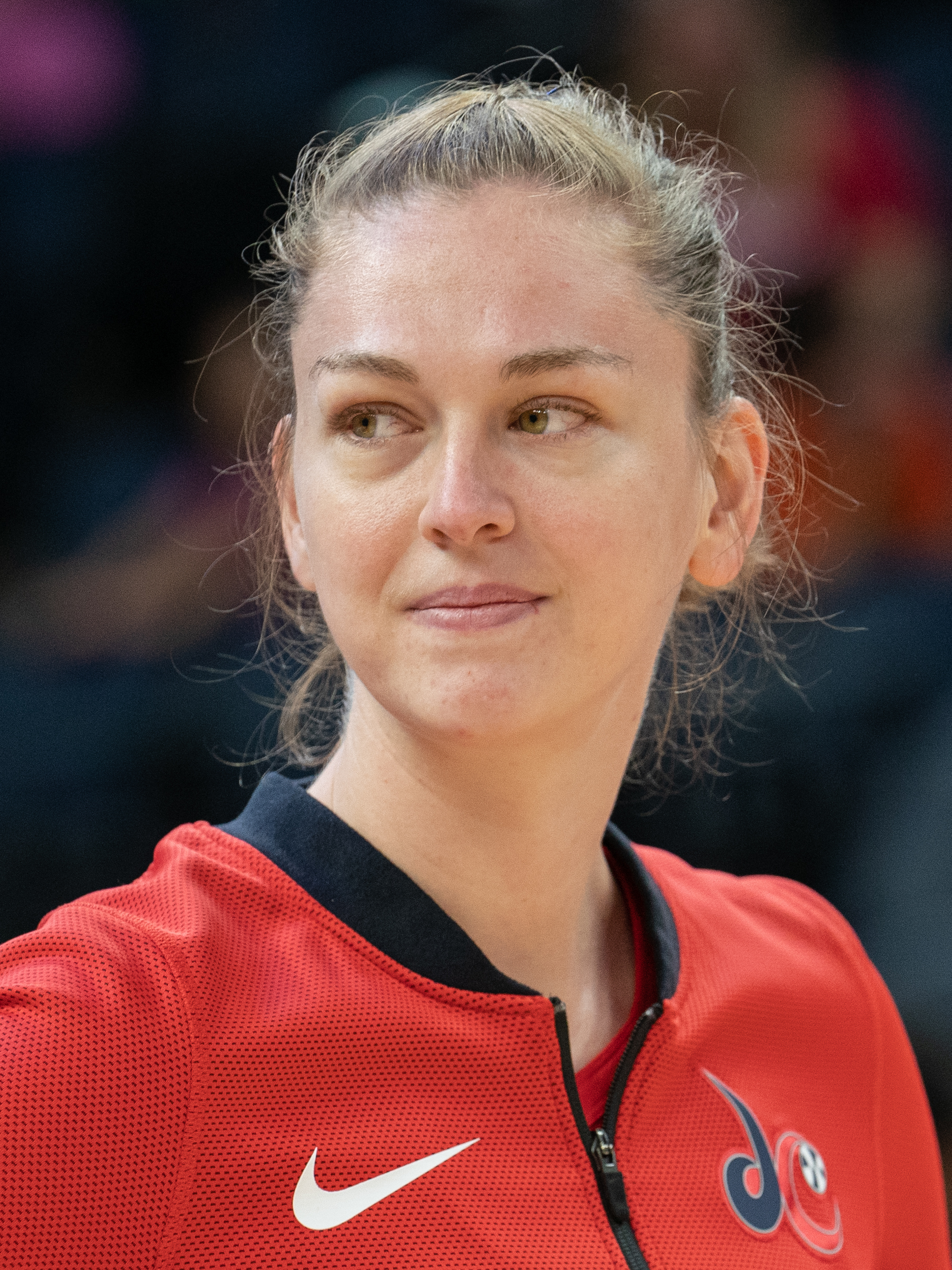
Meesseman with the Washington Mystics in 2019

Emma Meesseman (born 13 May 1993) is a Belgian professional basketball player for Fenerbahçe of the Women's Basketball Super League and EuroLeague Women. After playing basketball in Belgium, Meesseman was drafted by the Washington Mystics with the 19th overall pick in the second round of the 2013 WNBA draft. She has also played for the Belgian national team and several European professional teams. She was named the 2011 FIBA Europe Young Women's Player of the Year and the 2019 WNBA Finals MVP. Meesseman studied physical education at Vrije Universiteit Brussel.

== Professional career ==
=== Europe ===
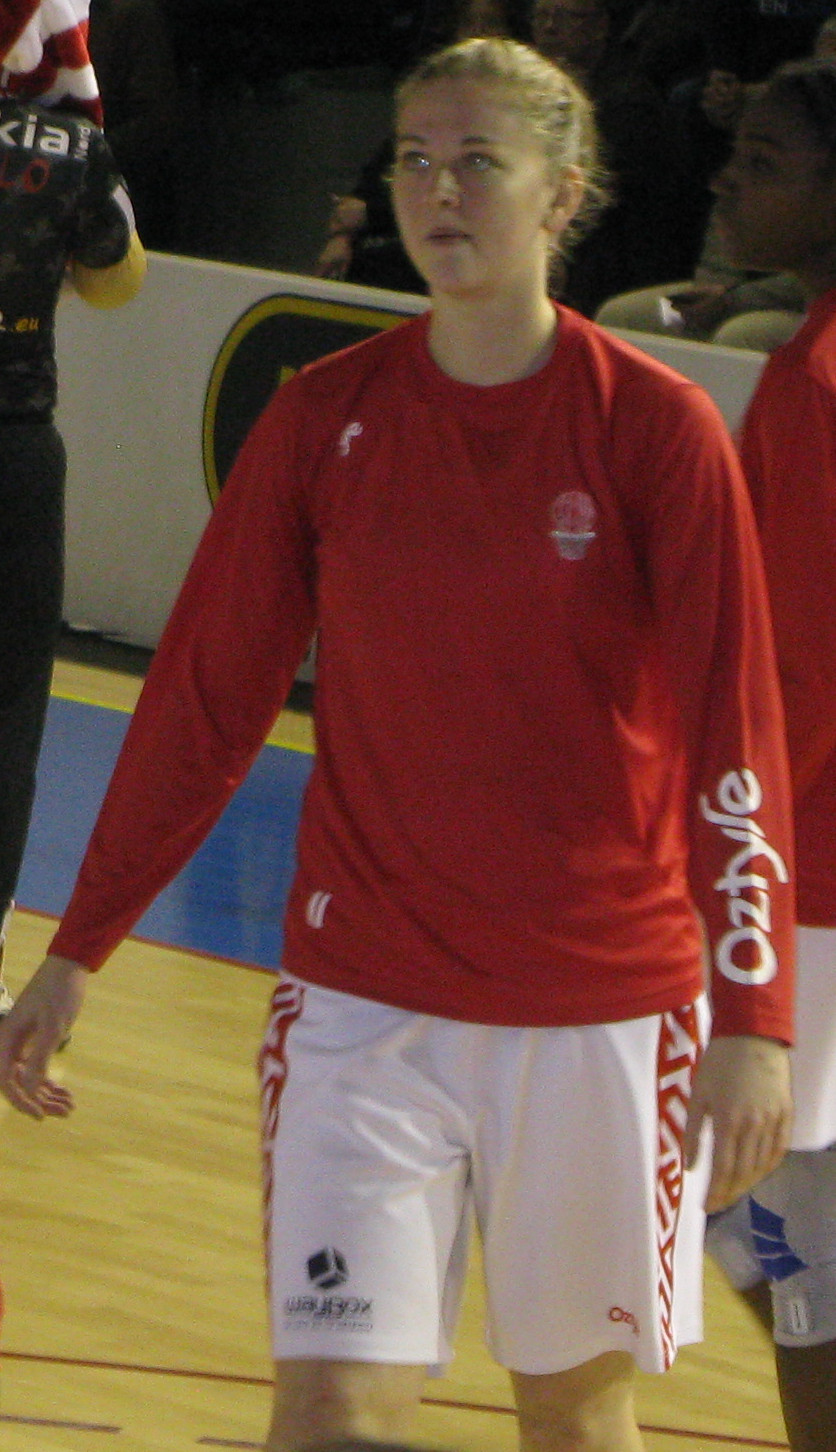
Meesseman in 2013

Meesseman's club career began at the age of 16. She played domestically for the Blue Cats, based in her birth town of Ypres, and in the EuroCup for Lotto Young Cats, also in her native Belgium. In her second season with the Blue Cats, she helped win the team its first national title and was named Belgium Championship MVP.

In 2012, she joined ESB Villeneuve-d'Ascq of the Ligue Féminine de Basketball. In her second year with the club she played in her third EuroCup, reaching the semi-finals before falling to WBC Dynamo Moscow.

==== Russia ====
Meesseman played for Spartak Moscow from 2014 to 2016, competing in two EuroCup tournaments. In February 2016, she was acquired by UMMC Ekaterinburg.

With UMMC Ekaterinburg, Meesseman won the Russian National League championship in 2016, 2017, 2018, 2019 and 2020. Meesseman and UMMC Ekaterinburg won the 2015–16 EuroLeague, Europe's premium basketball competition for women, in April 2016. Having missed out on the final in 2017 and finished 3rd, Meesseman and UMMC Ekaterinburg won the 2017–18 EuroLeague. Meesseman, averaging 19 points in the Final Four tournament, was elected Final Four MVP. Meesseman and UMMC Ekaterinburg followed this up with further Euroleague wins in seasons 2018–19 and 2020–21.

==== Fenerbahçe ====
She signed with Fenerbahçe Istanbul on 1 July 2022 for EuroLeague Women season. Meesseman, who won 2022–23 EuroLeague Women championship and the 2022–23 Basketball Super League championship with the Fenerbahçe Alagöz Holding jersey in the 2022–2023 season, was selected as the regular season MVP in EuroLeague Women and also been in 2022–23 All-EuroLeague First Team.

On 26 July 2023, she signed with the club for one-year deal. In the 2023–24 season, she helped her club back to back win the 2023–24 EuroLeague Women championship and the 2023–24 Basketball Super League championship for the sixth time in a row, also selected as the regular season MVP in EuroLeague Women and also been in 2023–24 All-EuroLeague First Team.

On 4 August 2024, she renewed her contract with the team for 2024–25 season. She won the EuroLeague with Fenerbahçe in April 2026, becoming the only player to have won the title for a record of seven times in the modern era. She also moved past the landmark of 2,000 points in that EuroLeague season.

=== WNBA ===
Meesseman was drafted 19th overall in the second round of the 2013 WNBA draft by the Washington Mystics. In her rookie season, Meesseman was a back-up center on the Mystics' roster, averaging 4.4 points per game and 3.1 rebounds per game in 34 games with 1 start.

In the 2014 season, Meesseman became the starting center for the Mystics and averaged 10.1 points per game and a career-high 6.4 rebounds per game.

In the 2015 season, Meesseman would play outside her natural position after being moved to power forward in the Mystics' starting line-up to make room for Stefanie Dolson at the center position. Meesseman would have a breakout season in 2015, averaging 11.6 points per game, 6.3 rebounds per game, was ranked fifth in blocks per game and also added three-point shooting to her skill set. Meesseman scored a career-high 24 points to go along with 10 rebounds in a loss against the Tulsa Shock on 19 June 2015. She also made her first career all-star game appearance after being voted into the 2015 WNBA All-Star Game.

In 2016, Meesseman signed a three-year contract extension with the Mystics. During the 2016 season, Meesseman would have the best season of her career thus far, averaging a career-high 15.2 points per game and led the league in three-point field goal percentage.

In 2017, after the Mystics traded Dolson to the Chicago Sky, Meesseman continued her role at the power forward spot in the starting lineup. In the Mystics' season opener, Meesseman scored 13 points along with 8 rebounds in an 89–74 victory over the San Antonio Stars. During the 2017 season, Meesseman left the Mystics after the first four games due to overseas commitment to play for her national team during the FIBA world championship qualifying tournament. She returned on 12 May 2017 for practice and was activated to play on the Mystics' roster on 28 June 2017. On 30 July 2017 Meesseman scored a new career-high of 30 points along with 10 rebounds in a 77–70 victory over the Atlanta Dream. The Mystics secured a playoff berth as the #6 seed in the league with an 18–16 record. In the first round elimination game, the Mystics defeated the Dallas Wings 86–76, Meesseman scored 16 points and grabbed 10 rebounds. They advanced to the second round elimination game, where they defeated the #3-seeded New York Liberty, 82–68, advancing to the semi-finals, making it the first time in franchise history where the Mystics have advanced past the second round. Meeeseman scored 5 points and grabbed 5 rebounds in the win. In the semi-finals, the Mystics were defeated by the Minnesota Lynx in a 3-game sweep.

In January 2018, it was announced that Meesseman would sit out the entire 2018 season to play for Team Belgium in the 2018 FIBA Women's Basketball World Cup tournament. Without Meesseman, the Mystics would make a run to the WNBA Finals, but were defeated in a 3-game sweep by the Seattle Storm.

In 2019, Meesseman returned to the Mystics and played most of the season off the bench. With her return and strong contribution off the bench, the Mystics would finish as the number 1 seed with a 26–8 record, receiving a double-bye to the semi-finals. In the semi-finals, the Mystics defeated the Las Vegas Aces 3–1, advancing to the WNBA Finals for the second year in a row. Meesseman's presence and off-the-bench heroics earned her Finals MVP honors as the Mystics defeated the Connecticut Sun in five games. Meesseman became the first European player to be named Finals MVP and only the second international player in league history (the first was Lauren Jackson).

In 2020, the season was delayed and shortened to 22 games in a bubble at IMG Academy due to the COVID-19 pandemic. On 5 August 2020 Meesseman scored a season-high 24 points along with 13 rebounds in a 83–77 victory over the Las Vegas Aces. During the season, the Mystics were shorthanded with key players leaving in free agency and sitting out for health concerns as they finished 9–13 with the number 8 seed. Meesseman had returned to the starting lineup with increased playing time. They would lose 85–84 to the Phoenix Mercury in the first round elimination game.

Ahead of the 2022 season, Meesseman signed with the Chicago Sky, where she was reunited with her Belgian national teammates Julie Allemand and Ann Wauters (with the latter serving as an assistant coach).

In July 2025, Meesseman committed to play for the New York Liberty.

=== International ===
Meesseman made her debut for Belgium at the 2011 FIBA Europe Under-18 Championship for Women. In the final, Meesseman led the team to victory 77–49 over France, herself scoring 25 points, and was named tournament MVP. On 25 November 2015 she scored 31 points, made seventeen rebounds and five assists for the women's senior team in a EuroBasket Women 2017 qualifier against Belarus.

==== EuroBasket ====
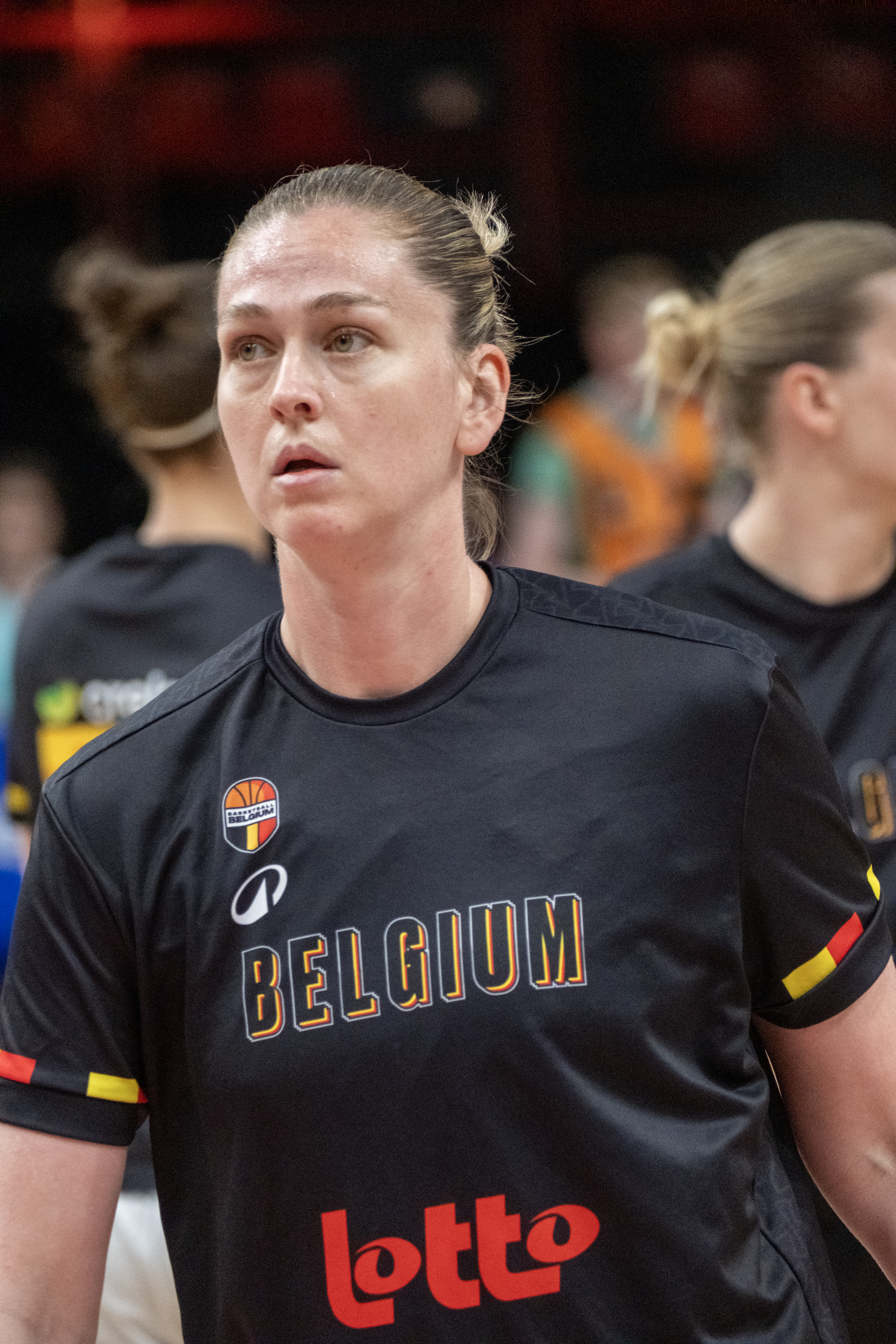
Meesseman with Belgium during 2025 EuroBasket

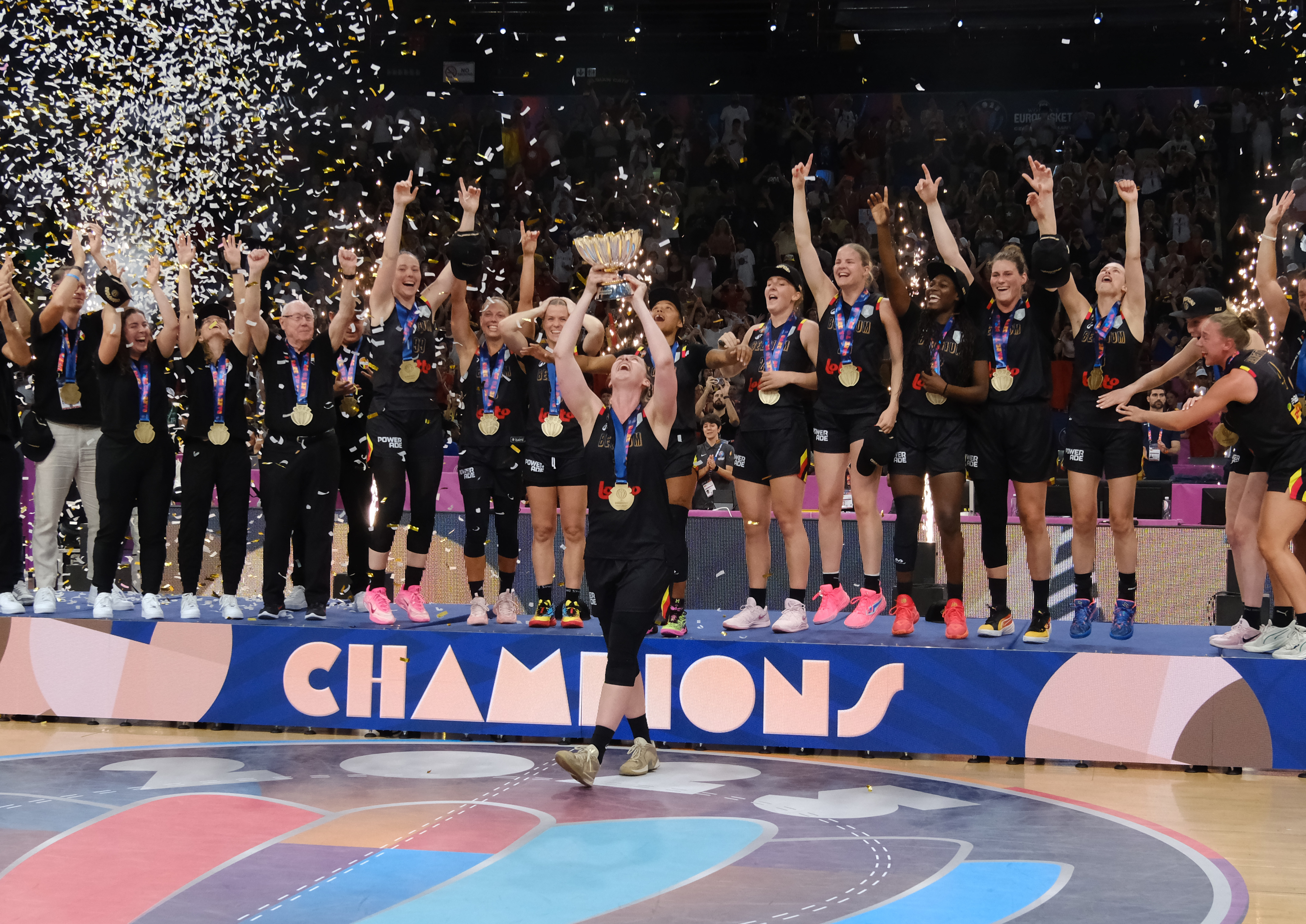
Meesseman holding up the 2025 EuroBasket championship cup.

Meesseman led Belgium to a best ever finish in EuroBasket Women 2017, a bronze medal, and was named to the All-Star Five of the tournament. With this finish in the top 5 of EuroBasket Women 2017, the Belgium women's national basketball team qualified for the 2018 FIBA Women's Basketball World Cup. Before this, the Belgium women's national basketball team had never qualified for a World Championships or the Olympic Games.

Continuing on from her strong performance at EuroBasket Women 2017, Meesseman led the Belgium women's national basketball team to a top finish in group C, besting (then second-ranked team in the world) Spain. The Belgian Cats next beat (the then third-ranked team in the world) France in the quarter-final only to lose against the top-ranked team in the world (USA) in the semi-final. Beaten in the bronze medal game by Spain, the Belgian women registered a 4th-place finish at their first FIBA Women's Basketball World Cup. Meesseman, averaging the most rebounds per game (10.7) and the second most points per game (18.5) at the tournament, was selected to the Tournament All-Star Five.

Meesseman led Belgium to their first ever title in EuroBasket Women 2023 at the final after defeating Spain, was named MVP of the tournament and to the All-Star Five of the tournament. Meesseman also made history after becoming the first ever player to claim a triple-double at the event. With their first ever title by winning the EuroBasket Women 2023, the Belgium women's national basketball team qualified for the Paris 2024 Olympic Qualifying Tournaments. She then repeated this feat in 2025, leading Belgium to a repeat second title in EuroBasket Women 2025, beating Spain in the final for a second time in a row, being named a historic back-to-back MVP and was again elected to the All-Star Five of the tournament. With 16 points, 11 rebounds and 7 assists in the final, she also became the first player to have 15+ points, 10+ rebounds and 5+ assists in a Women’s EuroBasket Final over the last 30 years. With this win, Belgium became only the third team in history to successfully defend their EuroBasket Women title with only the Soviet Union and Spain having done it before and became the first team in Eurobasket history to win two titles despite trailing at half-time in Final on both occasions.

==== Olympic Games ====
In 2020 the Belgian Cats, with Meesseman, qualified for the Olympic games in Tokyo. She was later also named the TISSOT MVP at the FIBA Women's Olympic Qualifying Tournament in Ostend. At the 2020 Summer Games, she led the Belgium women's national basketball team to the quarter-finals, having defeated Australia and Puerto Rico and lost to China in the pool phase. In the quarterfinals, Belgium then suffered a loss to home team Japan. At the end of the tournament, she was elected to the All-Star Five of the tournament, having posted the best points per game, steals and efficiency in the tournament.

In February 2024, Belgium hosted one of the three Olympic Qualifying Tournaments in Antwerp and secured on home soil a Paris 2024 quota spot. Meesseman was later one of Belgium's flag bearers at the opening ceremony of the 2024 Summer Olympics, becoming the first Belgium basketball player to receive this honor.

In the Paris Olympics, the Belgian national team advanced to the semifinals for the first time ever after defeating Spain 79–66 in the quarterfinals. Meesseman was the best scorer in the Belgian team with 19 points, 9 rebounds and 4 blocks. In the semifinal overtime loss, 75–81, against France, Meesseman was the game's top scorer with 19 points, including a game-tying three-pointer 8 seconds before the end of regulation. In the bronze medal game, Meesseman scored 23 points, but Belgium lost to Australia 81–85, missing out on a medal. At the end of the tournament, she was once again elected to the All-Star Five of the tournament, having posted the best points per game and efficiency in the tournament.

== Career statistics ==
Legend
GP	Games played	GS	Games started	MPG	Minutes per game	RPG	Rebounds per game
APG	Assists per game	SPG	Steals per game	BPG	Blocks per game	PPG	Points per game
TO	Turnovers per game	FG%	Field-goal percentage	3P%	3-point field-goal percentage	FT%	Free-throw percentage
**Bold**	Career best	°	League leader

†	Denotes seasons in which Meesseman won a WNBA championship

=== WNBA ===
==== Regular season ====
WNBA regular season statistics
Year	Team	GP	GS	MPG	FG%	3P%	FT%	RPG	APG	SPG	BPG	TO	PPG
2013	Washington	34	1	14.7	.446	.000	.810	3.1	1.2	0.5	0.7	**0.8**	4.4
2014	Washington	34	34	27.4	.520	.000	**.909**	**6.4**	2.5	**1.4**	1.0	1.7	10.1
2015	Washington	34	34	27.2	.556	.462	.829	6.3	1.7	0.9	1.3	1.2	11.6
2016	Washington	34	34	29.3	.533	.448°	.800	5.6	2.3	1.2	0.7	1.2	**15.2**
2017	Washington	23	21	28.4	.482	.318	.870	5.7	2.8	0.9	**1.5**	1.7	14.1
2019^{†}	Washington	23	6	23.6	.552	.422	.905	4.2	3.2	0.9	0.7	1.0	13.1
2020	Washington	20	20	**31.7**	.454	.289	.829	5.3	**4.5**	1.2	0.8	2.0	13.0
2022	Chicago	**36**	**36**	28.6	.571	.342	.887	5.5	3.8	**1.4**	0.8	1.4	12.4
2025	New York	17	12	25.9	**.572**	**.667**	.865	5.1	3.2	1.2	0.8	2.1	13.4
**Career**	9 years, 3 teams	255	198	26.1	.525	.394	.855	5.3	2.7	1.1	0.9	1.4	11.6

==== Playoffs ====
WNBA playoff statistics
Year	Team	GP	GS	MPG	FG%	3P%	FT%	RPG	APG	SPG	BPG	TO	PPG
2013	Washington	3	0	12.5	.455	.000	.667	1.3	1.0	0.0	1.0	1.3	4.0
2014	Washington	2	2	33.3	.526	.000	**1.000**	**8.0**	0.0	1.5	1.0	4.0	12.5
2015	Washington	3	3	33.1	.379	.250	.667	6.7	1.3	0.0	1.3	1.6	9.0
2017	Washington	5	5	31.2	.302	.231	.700	5.4	2.6	1.4	**1.6**	0.6	9.6
2019^{†}	Washington	**9**	3	28.2	**.582**	.516	.824	5.6	2.4	1.1	0.9	0.9	**19.3**
2020	Washington	1	1	**35.0**	.533	**1.000**°	.000	3.0	**4.0**	**2.0**	1.0	**0.0**	18.0
2022	Chicago	8	**8**	29.6	.470	.300	.833	4.0	3.5	1.5	0.9	1.1	11.1
2025	New York	3	0	13.3	.278	.000	.500	5.3	2.0	0.0	0.0	1.7	4.3
**Career**	8 years, 3 teams	34	22	27.2	.467	.423	.755	4.9	2.4	1.0	1.0	1.2	11.9

=== EuroLeague ===
†	Denotes seasons in which Meesseman won a EuroLeague championship

EuroLeague statistics
Year	Team	GP	GS	MPG	FG%	3P%	FT%	RPG	APG	SPG	BPG	TO	PPG	PIR
2015–16^{†}	(Russia) UMMC Ekaterinburg	5	1	24.4	.535	.333	.750	6.0	2.2	0.8	0.6	1.5	10.6	14.6
2016–17	(Russia) UMMC Ekaterinburg	**18**	3	10.3	.567	.389	.839	5.5	1.7	1.6	0.6	1.1	10.3	15.1
2017–18^{†}	(Russia) UMMC Ekaterinburg	**18**	**17**	27.7	.578	.263	.870	5.3	1.9	0.9	0.8	0.9	13.7	17.1
2018–19^{†}	(Russia) UMMC Ekaterinburg	17	15	26.0	.533	.400	.857	5.7	1.8	1.1	0.9	1.1	11.2	15.2
2019–20	(Russia) UMMC Ekaterinburg	13	12	22.4	**.672**°	**.647**	.923	4.6	3.2	1.8	0.4	1.3	14.1	19.6
2020–21^{†}	(Russia) UMMC Ekaterinburg	7	6	26.6	.500	.333	**1.000**°	5.3	3.6	1.3	0.3	**0.7**	11.3	17.1
2021–22	(Russia) UMMC Ekaterinburg	14	14	27.2	.545	.333	.750	**7.2**	4.2	1.6	0.6	1.6	11.6	18.9
2022–23^{†}	(Turkey) Fenerbahçe	15	15	**30.6**	.622°	.308	.800	6.5	3.4	**2.2**	0.9	1.1	15.2	22.6
2023–24^{†}	(Turkey) Fenerbahçe	16	16	30.5	.589°	.450	.821	5.9	**4.8**	1.7	**1.1**	1.3	**17.9**°	**24.3**°
2024–25	(Turkey) Fenerbahçe	14	14	30.0	.588	.500	.893	6.6	4.5	1.7	0.7	2.0	16.9	23.0°
2025–26^{†}	(Turkey) Fenerbahçe	15	15	30.2	.573	.273	.750	5.8	3.9	1.5	0.9	1.7	14.9	19.9
Career		152	128	27.2	.580	.398	.839	5.9	3.2	1.5	0.8	1.3	13.7	19.1

=== EuroCup ===
EuroCup statistics
Year	Team	GP	GS	MPG	FG%	3P%	FT%	RPG	APG	SPG	BPG	TO	PPG	PIR
2010–11	(Belgium) Lotto Young Cats	8	2	33.0	.479	.000	.737	8.4	1.3	**2.3**	**1.6**	3.0	**15.8**	18.0
2011–12	(Belgium) Lotto Young Cats	8	8	30.4	.466	—	.733	8.6	2.8	1.8	1.5	1.6	14.8	19.9
2013–14	(France) ESB Villeneuve-d'Ascq	**12**	**11**	**33.4**	.516	—	**.882**	6.5	2.8	1.2	1.3	2.2	11.9	16.3
2014–15	(Russia) WBC Sparta&K	8	7	28.3	.529	—	.786	6.0	**3.0**	1.9	0.5	1.6	12.6	17.0
2015–16	(Russia) WBC Sparta&K	10	10	32.0	**.575**°	**.400**	.833	**9.2**	**3.0**	2.0	1.4	**1.5**	14.4	23.6
Career		46	38	31.6	.512	.333	.788	7.7	2.6	1.8	1.3	2.0	13.7	18.9

=== SuperCup ===
SuperCup statistics
Year	Team	GP	GS	MPG	FG%	3P%	FT%	RPG	APG	SPG	BPG	TO	PPG	PIR
2016^{†}	(Russia) UMMC Ekaterinburg	1	1	28.7	.444	**1.000**	**1.000**	8.0	1.0	1.0	0.0	2.0	11.0	14.0
2018^{†}	(Russia) UMMC Ekaterinburg	1	1	23.1	.167	—	—	5.0	**5.0**	**2.0**	**4.0**	2.0	2.0	11.0
2019^{†}	(Russia) UMMC Ekaterinburg	0	0	Did not play.										
2021	(Russia) UMMC Ekaterinburg	1	1	28.0	.429	—	—	7.0	4.0	0.0	0.0	**1.0**	6.0	12.0
2023^{†}	(Turkey) Fenerbahçe	1	1	22.4	**.625**	—	—	**13.0**	4.0	**2.0**	2.0	**1.0**	10.0	**27.0**
2024^{†}	(Turkey) Fenerbahçe	1	1	**30.0**	.583	.000	—	6.0	4.0	1.0	1.0	2.0	**14.0**	19.0
Career		5	5	26.5	.476	.500	1.000	7.8	3.6	1.2	1.4	1.6	8.6	16.6

== Personal life ==
Meeseman's mother, Sonja Tankrey, is a former basketball player. She was the Belgian Women's Basketball Player of the Year in 1983.

Meesseman speaks fluent Dutch, French and English. Meesseman was also born with 50% hearing. She wears hearing devices behind both ears to compensate for her lack of hearing.

== Honours and awards ==
=== Basketball ===
==== Team ====
(Belgium) Blue Cats Ieper

- Belgian League: (gold) 2011–12
- Belgian Cup: (gold) 2011–12

(France) ESB Villeneuve-d'Ascq

- French Cup: (silver) 2013–14

(Russia) UMMC Ekaterinburg

- EuroLeague Women: (gold) 2015–16, 2017–18, 2018–19, 2020–21
- FIBA Europe SuperCup Women: (gold) 2016, 2018, 2019
- Russian League: (gold) 2015–2016, 2016–17, 2017–18, 2018–19, 2019–20, 2020–21 (silver) 2021–22
- Russian Cup: (gold) 2017, 2019
- Russian Super Cup: (gold) 2021
- UMMC Cup: (gold) 2016, 2018

(United States) Washington Mystics

- WNBA: (gold) 2019

(United States) Chicago Sky

- WNBA: (semi-final) 2022

(Turkey) Fenerbahçe

- EuroLeague Women: (gold) 2022–23, 2023–24, 2025–26
- FIBA Europe SuperCup Women: (gold) 2023, 2024, 2026
- Turkish Super League: (gold) 2022–23, 2023–24, 2024–25, 2025–26
- Turkish Cup: (gold) 2024, 2026
- Turkish Presidential Cup: (gold) 2024, 2025

(Belgium) National Team

- FIBA U17 World Cup: (4th place) 2010
- U18 European Championship: (gold) 2011
- FIBA World Cup: (4th place) 2018
- European Championship: (gold) 2023, 2025 (bronze) 2017, 2021

==== Individual ====
- MVP Belgian Pro Basketball League: 2010–11
- MVP U18 European Championship: 2011
- All-Star Five U18 European Championship: 2011
- FIBA Europe Young Women's Player of the Year: 2011
- WNBA All-Star Game selection: 2015
- WNBA 3-point field goal percentage leader: (2016)
- Eastern Conference Player of the Week: June 2016
- Most 3 points WNBA: 2016
- Final Four MVP EuroLeague Women: 2017-18
- All-Star Five FIBA Women's Basketball World Cup: 2018
- WNBA Finals MVP: 2019
- All-Star Five EuroLeague Women: 2019-20, 2020-21, 2022–23, 2023–24, 2024–25, 2025–26
- TISSOT MVP during the Olympic Qualifying tournament in Ostend: 2020
- All-Star Five Olympics Woman's Basketball Tournament: Tokyo 2020
- Top Scorer Olympics Woman's Basketball Tournament: Tokyo 2020
- All-Star Five European Championship: 2017, 2021, 2023, 2025
- MVP EuroLeague Women: 2022–23, 2023–24, 2024–25
- MVP of Turkish Women's Basketball Super League Finals: 2023, 2025
- MVP of Turkish Women's Basketball Presidential Cup: 2024, 2025
- MVP of Turkish Women's Basketball Cup Finals: 2024, 2026
- MVP European Championship: 2023, 2025
- Top scorer European Championship: 2023
- All-Star Five Olympics Woman's Basketball Tournament: Paris 2024
- Belgian National Sports Merit Award: 2025

=== Other ===
- Belgian Sportswoman of the Year: 2020, 2025
- Belgian Sports Team of the Year: 2020, 2023, 2025
- Vlaamse Reus: 2019
- Flemish Sportsjewel: 2019
- Badge of Honor of the Flemish Community: 2023
