= Miguel Méndez (basketball) =

Spanish basketball coach (born 1967)

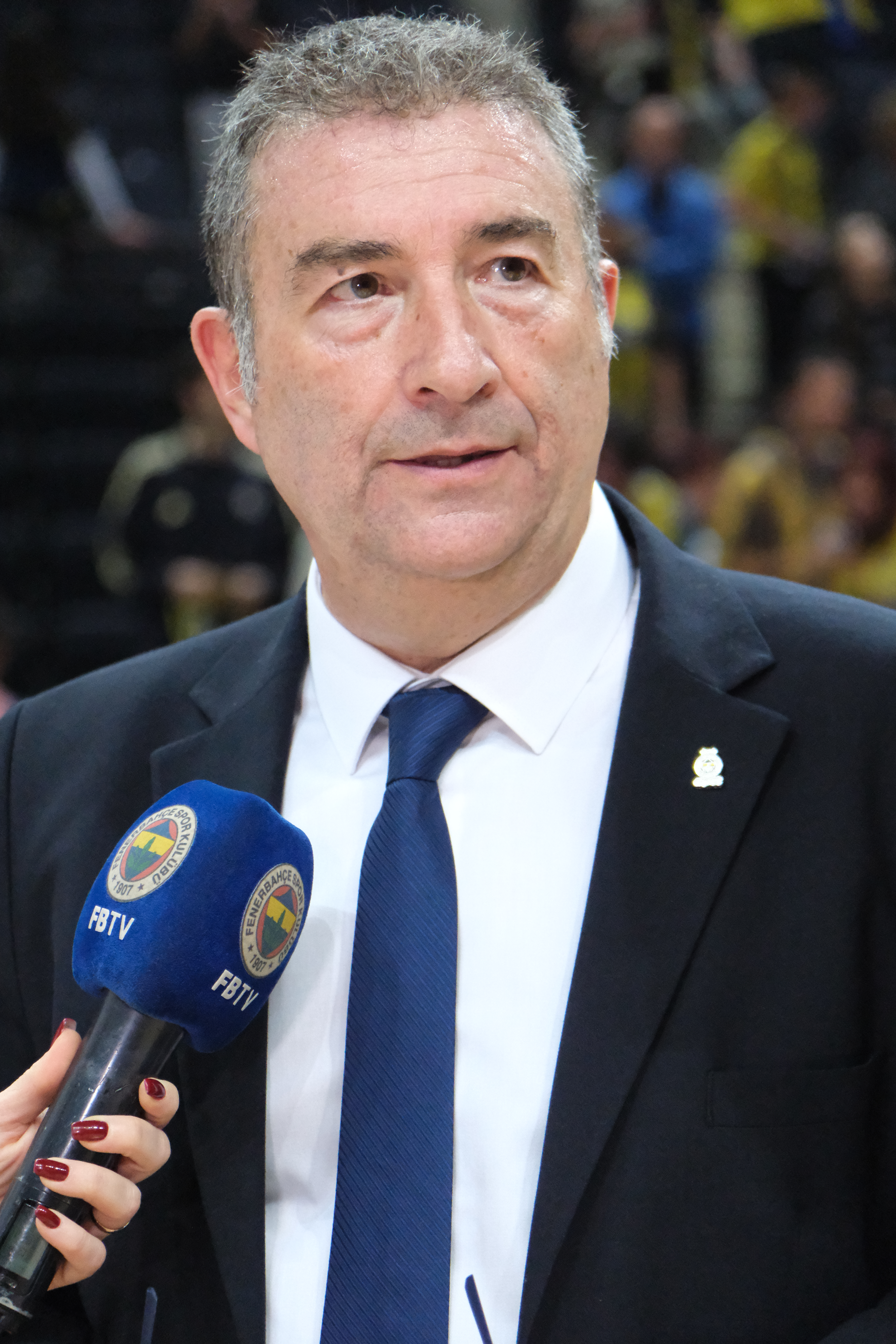
- Méndez in 2025

Personal information
- Born: 2 March 1967 (age 59) Vigo, Spain
- Position: Head coach
- Coaching career: 2001–present

Career history

Coaching
- 2001–2011: Celta de Vigo
- 2011–2013: Baloncesto Rivas
- 2013–2017: Schio
- 2018–2022: UMMC Ekaterinburg
- 2021–present: Spain
- 2022: Virtus Bologna
- 2025–2026: Fenerbahçe

Career highlights
- As head coach: 2× European Triple Crown winner (2019, 2026); 4× EuroLeague Women champion (2018, 2019, 2021, 2026); 2× SuperCup Women winner (2018, 2019); 2× Turkish Super League champion (2025, 2026); Turkish Cup champion (2026); Turkish Presidential Cup champion (2025); 4× Russian League winner (2018–2021); Russian Cup champion (2019); Russian Super Cup champion (2021); Copa de la Reina winner (2013); 3× LBF champion (2014–2016); 2× Coppa Italia winner (2014, 2015); 4× Supercoppa Italiana winner (2013–2016)
Medals
Women's basketball
Head coach for Spain
World Cup Women
Bronze medal – third place	2026 Germany
EuroBasket Women
Silver medal – second place	2023 Israel/Slovenia
Silver medal – second place	2025 Cyprus/Finland/Poland/Latvia

Miguel Méndez Martínez (born 2 March 1967) is a Spanish professional basketball coach who most recently coached Fenerbahçe of the Turkish Women's Basketball League and EuroLeague Women. He is also the head coach of the Spain women's national basketball team.

== Coaching career ==
=== Celta de Vigo and Baloncesto Rivas ===
Méndez began his coaching career in 2001, when he began coaching Celta de Vigo. In 2011, he signed a contract with Baloncesto Rivas. Under Méndez's tenure, Rivas reached the EuroLeague final and won the Copa de la Reina.

=== Schio ===
In 2013, Méndez signed a contract with the Italian club Schio. In his first season with the club, Schio won the Supercoppa Italiana, Coppa Italia and the LBF title in the 2013–14 season, a feat they repeated the following season. Schio won another league title in the 2015–16 season and played in the EuroLeague in their first season there. At the beginning of the 2016–17 season Méndez won his fourth (and final) Supercoppa Italiana with the team.

=== UMMC Ekaterinburg ===
In 2018, Méndez was hired by UMMC Ekaterinburg. Under his tenure, UMMC won four straight Russian league titles between 2018 and 2021 and the EuroLeague championship 2018, 2019, and 2021.

=== Fenerbahçe ===
On 15 April 2025, he signed with the Turkish powerhouse Fenerbahçe.

== National team coaching career ==
On 24 September 2021, Méndez was introduced as the new head coach of the Spanish women's team. With this coach, the Spain competed in the FIBA Women's EuroBasket 2023, where they lost to Belgium in the final.
