= 2024 Turkish Women's Basketball Cup =

- Season: 2023–24
- Duration: 2–5 January 2024
- Games played: 7
- Teams: 8
- TV partner: TRT Spor Yıldız

Finals
- Champions: Fenerbahçe (14th title)
- Runners-up: ÇBK Mersin

Awards
- Final MVP: (Belgium) Emma Meesseman

The 2024 Turkish Women's Basketball Cup (Turkish: 2024 Basketbol Kadınlar Türkiye Kupası), also known as ING Kadınlar Türkiye Kupası for sponsorship reasons, was the 30th edition of Turkey's top-tier level professional women's domestic basketball cup competition. The quarterfinals of tournament were held on 2 January 2024 in 4 different venues in Istanbul, followed by the semi-finals and the final held from 4 to 5 January 2024 at the Şehit Turgut Solak Spor Salonu in Balıkesir, Turkey.

== Qualified teams ==
The top eight placed teams after the first half of the top-tier level Women's Basketball Super League 2023–24 season qualified for the tournament. The four highest-placed teams played against the lowest-seeded teams in the quarter-finals. The competition will be played under a single elimination format.

Pos	Team	Pld	W	L	PF	PA	PD	Pts	Seeding
1	Fenerbahçe	14	14	0	1247	855	+392	28	Seeded
2	ÇBK Mersin	14	11	3	1141	962	+179	25	Seeded
3	Beşiktaş	14	9	5	1121	1017	+104	23	Seeded
4	OGM Ormanspor	14	9	5	1125	1095	+30	23	Seeded
5	Galatasaray	14	9	5	1127	1104	+23	23	Unseeded
6	İzmit Belediyespor	14	8	6	1075	1043	+32	22	Unseeded
7	Nesibe Aydın	14	7	7	1060	1025	+35	21	Unseeded
8	Emlak Konut	14	7	7	1013	1048	−35	21	Unseeded

Source: KBSL

== Eşleşmeler ==
Quarterfinals; 2 January
1	Fenerbahçe	96
7	Nesibe Aydın	57
8	Emlak Konut	63
4	OGM Ormanspor	72
5	Galatasaray	65
2	ÇBK Mersin	76
3	Beşiktaş	95
6	İzmit Belediyespor	85

Semifinals; 4 January
1	Fenerbahçe	93
4	OGM Ormanspor	86
2	ÇBK Mersin	87
3	Beşiktaş	84

Final; 5 January
1	Fenerbahçe	79
2	ÇBK Mersin	76

== Quarterfinals ==
Note: All times are TRT (UTC+3) as listed by Turkish Basketball Federation.

2 January 2024 QF	Fenerbahçe	96–57	Nesibe Aydın	Istanbul
13:00	Scoring by quarter: 24–12, 22–19, 32–12, 18–14
	Pts: Howard 23; Rebs: Howard, Meesseman 9 Asts: Onar 8 PIR: Howard 27	Boxscore	Pts: Cannon 16; Rebs: Cannon 10; Asts: Thomas 8 PIR: Cannon 17	Arena: Metro Enerji Sports Hall; Referees: Murat Ciner, Aydın Karaçam, Kadir Giray Esen

2 January 2024 QF	Emlak Konut	63–71	OGM Ormanspor	Istanbul
15:30	Scoring by quarter: 19–21, 18–14, 13–19, 13–18
	Pts: Çidal 23; Rebs: Turan 11; Asts: Wiese 4	Boxscore	Pts: Onyenwere 19; Rebs: Topuz 9 Asts: Sutton, Fitik 5	Arena: Şehit Mustafa Özel Spor Kompleksi; Referees: Orhan Çağrı Hekimoğlu, Orkun Yurttaş, Mustafa Çeltiker

2 January 2024 QF	Galatasaray	65–76	ÇBK Mersin	Istanbul
18:00	Scoring by quarter: 22–19, 15–18, 15–17, 13–22
	Pts: Yıldızhan, Vanloo 16; Rebs: Smith, Allen 8 Asts: Allen, Vanloo 6	Boxscore	Pts: Williams 30; Rebs: Williams 7 Asts: Mabrey 6	Arena: Ahmet Cömert Spor Salonu; Referees: Ali Serkan Emlek, Turgut Işık, Barış Turgut

2 January 2024 QF	Beşiktaş	95–85	İzmit Belediyespor	Istanbul
20:30	Scoring by quarter: 24–23, 21–17, 20–13, 30–32
	Pts: Evans 27; Rebs: Li 13; Asts: Evans 12	Boxscore	Pts: Nared 27; Rebs: Nared 8 Asts: Calhoun, Cora 4	Arena: Akatlar Arena; Attendance: Kaan Büyükçil, İbrahim Altıntaş, Barış Burak Durmuş

== Semifinals ==
Note: All times are TRT (UTC+3) as listed by Turkish Basketball Federation.

4 January 2024 SF	Fenerbahçe	93–86	OGM Ormanspor	Balıkesir
17:00	Scoring by quarter: 26–24, 24–15, 20–19, 23–28
	Pts: Meesseman 22; Rebs: Howard 9 Asts: McBride 6 PIR: Meesseman 27	Boxscore	Pts: Dantas 33; Rebs: three players 6 Asts: Fıtık, Sutton 7 PIR: Dantas 25	Arena: Şehit Turgut Solak Spor Salonu; Referees: Alper Özgök, Münevver Özemre, Uğur Akyıldız

4 January 2024 SF	ÇBK Mersin	87–84(OT)	Beşiktaş	Balıkesir
20:00	Scoring by quarter: 16–19, 17–20, 28–20, 15–17, Overtime: 11–8
	Pts: Mabrey 34; Rebs: Williams, Mabrey 7 Asts: Mabrey 9	Boxscore	Pts: Evans 25; Rebs: Bayram 11; Asts: Evans 9	Arena: Şehit Turgut Solak Spor Salonu; Referees: Mehmet Şahin, Nihat Çetin, Atakan Kaymak

== Final ==
5 January 2024 F	Fenerbahçe	79–76(OT)	ÇBK Mersin	Balıkesir
19:00	Scoring by quarter: 19–15, 18–13, 19–22, 15–21, Overtime: 8–5
	Pts: McBride 17; Rebs: Howard 14; Asts: Anderson, McBride 6 PIR: McBride 21	Boxscore	Pts: Mabrey 23; Rebs: Williams 15; Asts: Mabrey 9 PIR: Williams 28	Arena: Şehit Turgut Solak Spor Salonu; Referees: Fatih Arslanoğlu, Halil Erkoç, Alper Gökçebel

Starters:			Pts	Reb	Ast
PG	12	(Serbia) Yvonne Anderson	13	2	6
SG	10	(Turkey) Alperi Onar	14	2	1
SF	21	(United States) Kayla McBride	17	4	6
PF	6	(United States) Natasha Howard	15	14	1
C	11	(Belgium) Emma Meesseman	8	9	4
Reserves:					
PF	1	(Turkey) Sudenur Akarpa	DNP		
SG	2	(Turkey) Sevgi Uzun	11	0	1
PG	4	(Turkey) Duygu Özen	DNP		
PF	8	(Turkey) Selin Rachel Gül	DNP		
F	9	(Turkey) İdil Saçalır	0	0	0
PF	15	(Turkey) Tilbe Şenyürek	1	4	0
PG	30	(Turkey) Ayşe Yılmaz	DNP		
Head coach:
(French Federation of Basketball) Valérie Garnier

Fenerbahçe	Mersin

Fenerbahçe	Statistics	Mersin
22/48 (45.8%)	2-point field goals	19/47 (40.4%)
9/22 (40.9%)	3-point field goals	7/25 (28%)
8/12 (66.7%)	Free throws	17/22 (77.3%)
7	Offensive rebounds	19
29	Defensive rebounds	34
36	Total rebounds	53
19	Assists	24
10	Steals	8
13	Turnovers	18
4	Blocks	1
20	Fouls	17

Starters:			Pts	Reb	Ast
PG	0	(Turkey) Asena Yalçın	3	1	0
SG	4	(United States) Marina Mabrey	23	11	9
SF	10	(Turkey) Sinem Ataş	3	2	2
PF	1	(United States) Elizabeth Williams	15	15	7
C	13	(Turkey) Quanitra Hollingsworth	20	13	1
Reserves:					
C	2	(Hungary) Virág Kiss	0	4	0
PF	3	(Turkey) Melis Gülcan	6	2	1
PG	5	(Netherlands) Laura Cornelius	6	2	2
SG	6	(Turkey) Derin Yaya	0	2	2
PF	12	(Turkey) Elif Bati	DNP		
PF	14	(Turkey) Meltem Avcı	DNP		
Head coach:
(Turkish Basketball Federation) Ceyhun Yıldızoğlu

== See also ==
- 2023–24 Women's Basketball Super League
