= Tilbe Şenyürek =

Turkish basketball player

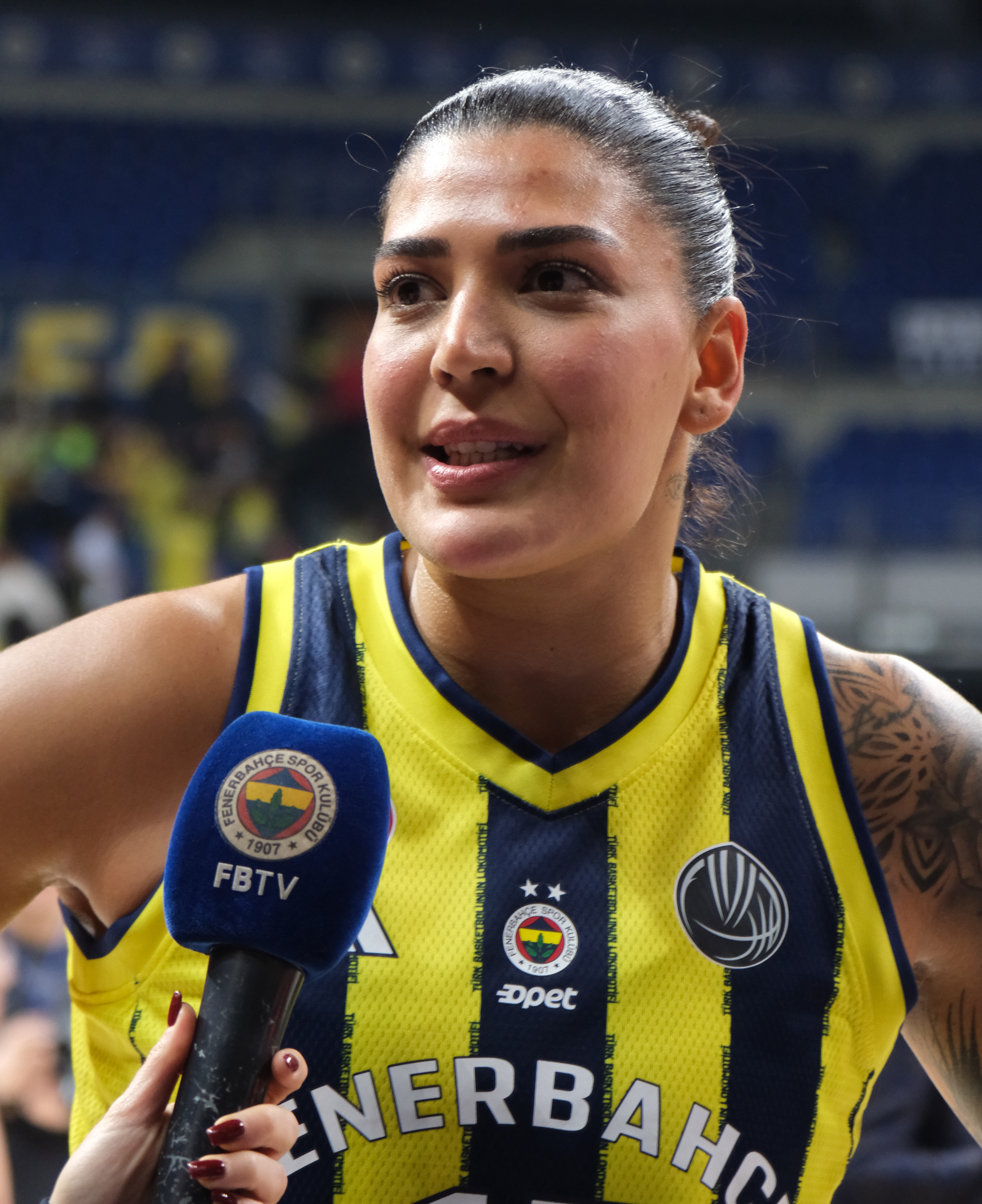
- Şenyürek in 2025

Bàsquet Girona
- Position: Power forward / center
- League: Turkish Super League

Personal information
- Born: 26 April 1995 (age 31) Seyhan, Adana, Turkey
- Listed height: 6 ft 2 in (1.88 m)
- Listed weight: 190 lb (86 kg)

Career history
- 2012–2017: Botaş SK
- 2017–2019: Fenerbahçe
- 2019–2020: Galatasaray
- 2020–2022: Botaş SK
- 2022–2023: AZS AJP Gorzów Wielkopolski
- 2023–2026: Fenerbahçe
- 2026–present: Spar Girona

Career highlights
- 5× Turkish Super League champion (2018, 2019, 2024, 2025, 2026); 3× Turkish Cup champion (2019, 2024, 2026); 2× Turkish Super Cup champion (2024, 2025); 2× EuroLeague champion (2024, 2026); 2× FIBA Europe SuperCup Women champion (2023, 2024); Triple Crown (2024, 2026)

Tilbe Şenyürek Arslan (born 26 April 1995) is a Turkish professional basketball player for Spar Girona of the Liga Femenina Endesa and EuroLeague Women .

== Honours ==
- EuroLeague Women
  - Championship (2) 2023-24, 2025-26
  - 3rd place (2) 2021-22, 2024-25
- FIBA Europe SuperCup Women:
  - Championship (2) 2023, 2024
- Women's Basketball Super League of Turkey
  - Championship (5) 2017–18, 2018–19, 2023-24, 2024-25, 2025-26
- Women's Basketball Super League of Poland
  - 3rd place (1) 2022-23
- Turkish Cup
  - Championship (3) 2018–19, 2023-24, 2025-26
- Polish Cup
  - Runners-up (1) 2022-23
- Turkish Basketball Presidential Cup
  - Championship (2) 2024, 2025
  - Runners-up (1) 2018

== See also ==
- Turkish women in sports
