= 2020 FIBA Women's Olympic Qualifying Tournaments – Ostend =

2020 FIBA World Olympic Qualifying Tournament for Women
Ostend, Belgium

Tournament details
- Host country: Belgium
- Dates: 6–9 February
- Teams: 4
- Venue(s): 1 (in 1 host city)

Final positions
- Champions: Canada

Tournament statistics
- MVP: (Belgium) Emma Meesseman
- Top scorer: (Belgium) Meesseman (20.3)
- Top rebounds: (Japan) Tokashiki (8.7)
- Top assists: (Belgium) Allemand (Japan) Motohashi (5.3)
- PPG (Team): Japan (75.7)
- RPG (Team): Canada (42.3)
- APG (Team): Belgium (18.0)

Official website
- WOQT Belgium

The 2020 FIBA Women's Olympic Qualifying Tournament in Ostend was one of four 2020 FIBA Women's Olympic Qualifying Tournaments. The tournament was held in Ostend, Belgium, from 6 to 9 February 2020.

Canada and Belgium qualified for the Olympics, alongside Japan, who were pre-qualified as the host.

== Teams ==
Team	Qualification	Date of qualification	FIBA World Ranking
Belgium	5th at the EuroBasket Women 2019	6 July 2019	9th
Canada	1st at the Americas pre-qualifying tournaments–Group A	16 November 2019	4th
Japan	Host nation for the Olympics	–	10th
Sweden	6th at the EuroBasket Women 2019	6 July 2019	22nd

== Venue ==
Ostend	2020 FIBA Women's Olympic Qualifying Tournaments – Ostend (Belgium)
Sea'Arena	2020 FIBA Women's Olympic Qualifying Tournaments – Ostend (Belgium)
Capacity: 5,000	2020 FIBA Women's Olympic Qualifying Tournaments – Ostend (Belgium)

== Standings ==
Pos	Team	Pld	W	L	PF	PA	PD	Pts	Qualification
1	Canada	3	3	0	211	174	+37	6	Summer Olympics
2	Belgium (H)	3	2	1	209	198	+11	5	Summer Olympics
3	Japan (Note: Japan has already qualified as the host nation.)	3	1	2	227	216	+11	4	
4	Sweden	3	0	3	157	216	−59	3	

Source: FIBA
Rules for classification: 1) Points; 2) Head-to-head results; 3) Points difference; 4) Points scored.
(H) Hosts

== Results ==
All times are local (UTC+1).

6 February 2020
18:05

Boxscore

Japan	75–54	Sweden
Scoring by quarter: 10–12, 15–8, 28–18, 22–16
Pts: Tokashiki 21; Rebs: Tokashiki 12; Asts: Motohashi 6		Pts: Loyd 18; Rebs: Magarity, Zahui 8 Asts: Loyd 3

Sea'Arena, Ostend
Referees: Yener Yılmaz (TUR), Amy Bonner (USA), Ryan Jones (NZL)

6 February 2020
20:35

Boxscore

Canada	61–56	Belgium
Scoring by quarter: 12–7, 18–16, 16–19, 15–14
Pts: Nurse 19; Rebs: Carleton, Raincock-Ekunwe 6 Asts: Nurse 3		Pts: Meesseman 14; Rebs: K. Mestdagh 7 Asts: Allemand, K. Mestdagh 4

Sea'Arena, Ostend
Referees: Ademir Zurapović (BIH), Gina Cross (USA), Andreia Silva (BRA)

8 February 2020
18:05

Boxscore

Belgium	92–84	Japan
Scoring by quarter: 13–22, 27–12, 28–19, 24–31
Pts: Meesseman 23; Rebs: Meesseman 7 Asts: Allemand 7		Pts: Hayashi 24; Rebs: Motohashi, Tokashiki 5 Asts: Yoshida 7

Sea'Arena, Ostend
Referees: Ademir Zurapović (BIH), Gina Cross (USA), Andreia Silva (BRA)

8 February 2020
20:35

Boxscore

Sweden	50–80	Canada
Scoring by quarter: 14–17, 17–20, 10–22, 9–21
Pts: F. Eldebrink 14; Rebs: Halvarsson 6 Asts: three players 2		Pts: Achonwa 16; Rebs: Achonwa 8 Asts: Raincock-Ekunwe 4

Sea'Arena, Ostend
Referees: Amy Bonner (USA), Yener Yılmaz (TUR), Yuen Chun Yip (HKG)

9 February 2020
15:00

Boxscore

Sweden	53–61	Belgium
Scoring by quarter: 14–14, 9–7, 10–21, 20–19
Pts: F. Eldebrink 14; Rebs: Magarity 12; Asts: E. Eldebrink 4		Pts: Meesseman 24; Rebs: three players 5 Asts: Allemand 5

Sea'Arena, Ostend
Referees: Ademir Zurapović (BIH), Amy Bonner (USA), Andreia Silva (BRA)

9 February 2020
18:05

Boxscore

Canada	70–68	Japan
Scoring by quarter: 15–17, 16–13, 21–19, 18–19
Pts: Nurse 19; Rebs: Achonwa 8 Asts: Langlois 5		Pts: Hayashi 21; Rebs: Akaho, Tokashiki 9 Asts: Motohashi 4

Sea'Arena, Ostend
Referees: Yener Yılmaz (TUR), Ryan Jones (NZL), Yuen Chun Yip (HKG)

== Statistics and awards ==
=== Statistical leaders ===
Players

Points

Name	PPG
(Belgium) Emma Meesseman	20.3
(Canada) Kia Nurse	16.0
(Japan) Saki Hayashi	15.0
(Canada) Natalie Achonwa	13.3
(Sweden) Kalis Loyd	12.3

Rebounds

Name	RPG
(Japan) Ramu Tokashiki	8.7
(Sweden) Regan Magarity	7.3
(Canada) Natalie Achonwa	6.3
(Belgium) Emma Meesseman	6.0
(Sweden) Amanda Zahui B.	5.7

Assists

Name	APG
(Belgium) Julie Allemand	5.3
(Japan) Nako Motohashi	5.3
(Japan) Rui Machida	3.7
(Canada) Miah-Marie Langlois	3.3
(Belgium) Emma Meesseman	3.3

Blocks

Name	BPG
(Belgium) Kyara Linskens	1.7
(Japan) Ramu Tokashiki	1.3
(Belgium) Julie Allemand	0.7
(Belgium) Antonia Delaere	0.7
(Belgium) Jana Raman	0.7
(Canada) Natalie Achonwa	0.7
(Canada) Kayla Alexander	0.7
(Canada) Kim Gaucher	0.7
(Japan) Himawari Akaho	0.7

Steals

Name	SPG
(Canada) Miah-Marie Langlois	2.0
(Canada) Kia Nurse	2.0
(Belgium) Emma Meesseman	1.7
(Belgium) Kyara Linskens	1.3
(Sweden) Regan Magarity	1.3

Teams

Points

Team	PPG
Japan	75.7
Canada	70.3
Belgium	69.7
Sweden	52.3

Rebounds

Name	RPG
Canada	42.3
Belgium	35.3
Japan	34.3
Sweden	34.0

Assists

Name	APG
Belgium	18.0
Japan	16.7
Canada	15.3
Sweden	8.0

Blocks

Name	BPG
Belgium	3.7
Canada	3.0
Japan	2.3
Sweden	2.0

Steals

Name	SPG
Canada	7.7
Belgium	6.7
Sweden	5.0
Japan	4.7

=== Awards ===
The all star-teams and MVP were announced on 9 February 2020.

All-Star Team
Guards	Forwards	Center
(Japan) Saki Hayashi (Belgium) Julie Allemand	(Canada) Natalie Achonwa (Japan) Ramu Tokashiki	(Belgium) Emma Meesseman
MVP: (Belgium) Emma Meesseman
