= Alperi Onar =

Turkish basketball player

- Alperi Onar

No. 10 – Fenerbahçe
- Position: Point guard
- League: Turkish Super League; EuroLeague Women

Personal information
- Born: 2 January 1996 (age 30) Seyhan, Adana, Turkey
- Listed height: 5 ft 7 in (1.70 m)

Career history
- 2012–2015: BOTAŞ
- 2015–2016: Çankaya Üniversitesi
- 2016–2018: Ormanspor
- 2018–2020: Galatasaray
- 2020–2021: Ormanspor
- 2021–present: Fenerbahçe

Career highlights
- 3× EuroLeague champion (2023, 2024, 2026); 3× FIBA Europe SuperCup Women champion (2023, 2024, 2026); 6× Turkish Super League champion (2021, 2022, 2023, 2024, 2025, 2026); 2× Turkish Cup winner (2024, 2026); 2× Turkish Presidential Cup champion (2024, 2025); 2× Triple Crown (2024, 2026)

Şerife Alperi Onar (born 2 January 1996) is a Turkish basketball player for Fenerbahçe and the Turkish national team.

She is 1.70 m tall and plays the point guard position in both her Turkish league team Fenerbahçe.

== Honours ==
- EuroLeague Women
  - Championship (3) 2022-23, 2023-24, 2025-26
  - 3rd place (1) 2021-22
- FIBA Europe SuperCup Women:
  - Championship (3) 2023, 2024, 2026
- Women's Basketball Super League of Turkey
  - Championship (6) 2020-21, 2021-22, 2022-23, 2023-24, 2024-25, 2025-26
- Turkish Cup
  - Championship (2) 2023-24, 2025-26
  - Runners-up (1) 2021-22
- Turkish Basketball Presidential Cup
  - Championship (2) 2024, 2025
  - Runners-up (1) 2022
