= Sonja Tankrey =

Belgian basketball player

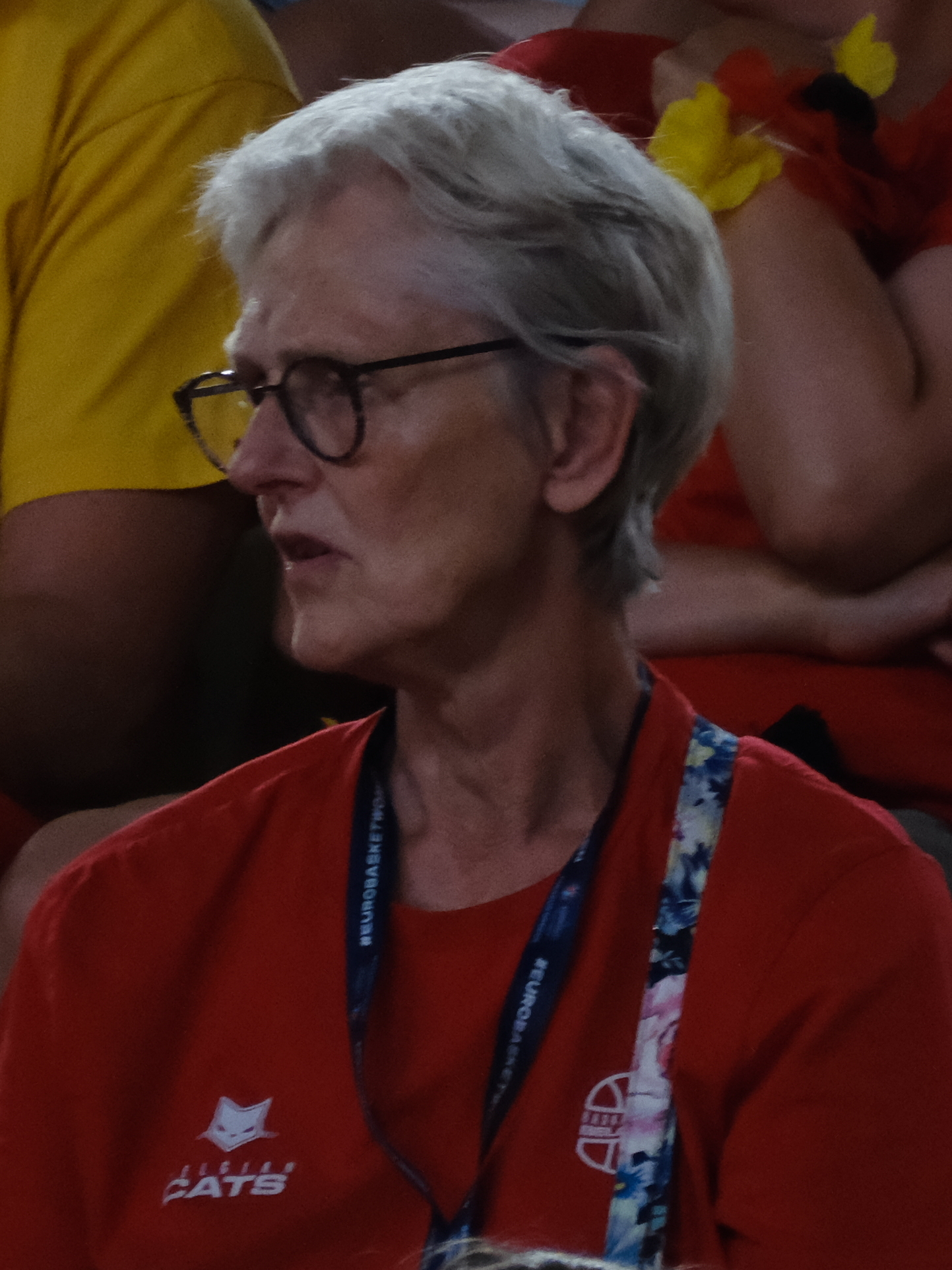
- Tankrey in 2025

Personal information
- Born: 30 April 1960 (age 66) Ypres, Belgium
- Position: Center
- Number: 11 (club and international)

Career history
- ?: Blue Cats Ieper
- 1980–1984: BBC Koksijde

Sonja Tankrey (born 30 April 1960) is a former Belgium international basketball player who represented at the EuroBasket Women 1980 and EuroBasket Women 1985.

She was the Belgian Women's Basketball Player of the Year in 1983.

She is mother of Belgian professional basketball player Emma Meesseman who is 2019 WNBA and six time EuroLeague Women champion and currently plays for Fenerbahçe of the Women's Basketball Super League and EuroLeague Women.

== Honours ==
=== Club ===
- Belgian Women's Basketball League (5) : 1980, 1981, 1982, 1983, 1984
- Belgium Cup (5) : 1980, 1981, 1982, 1983, 1984

=== Individual ===
- Belgian Women's Basketball Player of the Year (1): 1983
