= Sevgi Uzun =

Turkish basketball player (born 1997)

No. 10 – Galatasaray
- Position: Shooting guard
- League: Turkish Super League; EuroLeague Women

Personal information
- Born: 25 November 1997 (age 28) Fatih, Istanbul, Turkey
- Listed height: 5 ft 10 in (1.78 m)
- Listed weight: 141 lb (64 kg)

Career history
- 2013–2018: Beşiktaş
- 2018–2019: Çukurova Basketbol
- 2019–2021: Fenerbahçe
- 2021–2022: Ormanspor
- 2022–2023: Botaş SK
- 2023–2026: Fenerbahçe
- 2024: Dallas Wings
- 2025: Phoenix Mercury
- 2025: Chicago Sky
- 2026: Los Angeles Sparks
- 2026–present: Galatasaray

Career highlights
- 2× EuroLeague champion (2024, 2026); 2× FIBA Europe SuperCup Women champion (2023, 2024); 4× Turkish Super League champion (2021, 2024, 2025, 2026); Turkish Super League Finals MVP (2026); 3× Turkish Presidential Cup champion (2019, 2024, 2025); 3× Turkish Cup champion (2020, 2024, 2026); 2× Triple Crown (2024, 2026)
- Stats at WNBA.com
- Stats at Basketball Reference

Sevgi Uzun (born 25 November 1997) is a Turkish professional basketball player who plays as point guard position.

She most recently played for Galatasaray of the Turkish Super League and EuroLeague Women. She also plays for the Turkish national team.

== Career ==
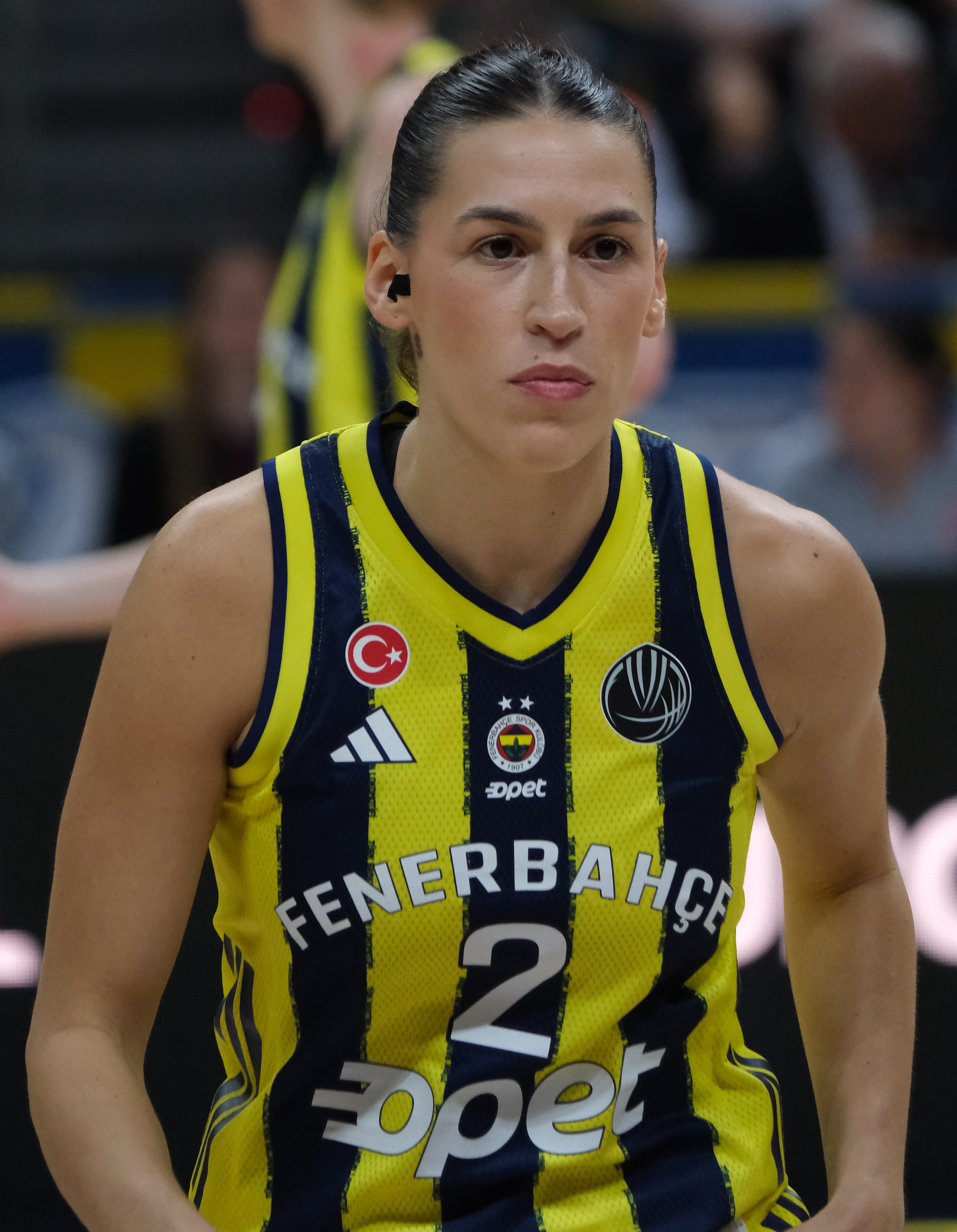
Uzun in 2025

Sevgi Uzun, who started playing basketball in her primary school years, started playing in the Beşiktaş youth academy in 2013 and stepped into professional basketball, playing in 86 matches in 5 seasons.

After successful seasons in Beşiktaş and Europe, she was transferred to Çukurova Basketbol team in the 2018-19 season and scored a total of 201 points with an average of 5.29 per game in 38 matches.

The 1.78 cm tall basketball player played for Fenerbahçe between 2019-2021, and won the 2020-21 undefeated championship of the Turkish Super League, won the 2019 Turkish Presidential Cup and also won the 2019-20 Turkish Cup with Fenerbahçe in her first era with the team.

She transferred to Ormanspor in the 2021-22 season and then played for Botaş SK in the 2022-23 season.

On 26 July 2023, she signed two years contract with Fenerbahçe where she became a EuroLeague Women champion in 2024, and also won FIBA Europe SuperCup Women in 2023 and 2024. In domestic competition, she won 2023–24 and 2024–25 Turkish Super League, 2024 Turkish Presidential Cup and 2024 Turkish Cup in her second era with Fenerbahçe.

On 25 July 2024, she extended her contract until the end of the 2025-26.

On July 18, 2026, she signed a two-year contract with Galatasaray.

=== WNBA career ===
On 23 February 2024, she was transferred to the Dallas Wings of the WNBA and became the second Turkish basketball player to play in the WNBA after Nevriye Yılmaz. In 2025, she was transferred to another WNBA team, Phoenix Mercury.

On 19 April 2026, Los Angeles Sparks signed Uzun to a training camp contract.

== International ==
Turkish National Women's Youth Basketball Team came third in the 2015 FIBA Europe Under-18 Championship for Women Division B held in Bucharest, Romania, and selected All-Star Five.

With her successful performance in the league and EuroLeague Women, she played for the national team over 150 times.

== Honours ==
- EuroLeague Women
  - Championship (2) 2023-24, 2025-26
  - 3rd place (1) 2020-21
- FIBA Europe SuperCup Women:
  - Championship (2) 2023, 2024
- Women's Basketball Super League of Turkey
  - Championship (4) 2020-21, 2023-24, 2024-25, 2025-26
  - Runners-up (1) 2018-19
- Turkish Cup
  - Championship (3) 2019-20, 2023-24, 2025-26
- Turkish Basketball Presidential Cup
  - Championship (3) 2019, 2024, 2025
- Triple Crown (2) : 2024, 2026

== Career statistics ==
Legend
GP	Games played	GS	Games started	MPG	Minutes per game	RPG	Rebounds per game
APG	Assists per game	SPG	Steals per game	BPG	Blocks per game	PPG	Points per game
TO	Turnovers per game	FG%	Field-goal percentage	3P%	3-point field-goal percentage	FT%	Free-throw percentage
**Bold**	Career best	°	League leader

=== WNBA ===
==== Regular season ====
Stats current through end of 2025 regular season

WNBA regular season statistics
Year	Team	GP	GS	MPG	FG%	3P%	FT%	RPG	APG	SPG	BPG	TO	PPG
2024	Dallas	**40**	**19**	**20.5**	.342	**.238**	**.826**	**1.6**	**3.0**	**0.9**	0.3	1.8	**4.4**
2025	Phoenix	7	0	14.6	.214	.125	.667	0.9	2.0	0.6	**0.4**	**1.4**	1.6
2025	Chicago	18	3	18.7	**.346**	.182	.700	1.4	2.7	0.5	0.0	1.8	3.7
**Career**	3 years, 3 teams	65	22	19.4	.337	.219	.769	1.5	2.8	0.8	0.2	1.8	3.9
