= 2025–26 Women's Basketball Super League =

Women's basketball league in Turkey

Women's Basketball Super League
- Season: 2025–26
- Dates: Regular season: 4 October 2025 – 28 February 2026; Play Offs: 2 March – 4 April 2026
- Games played: 110 (Regular season); 15 (Play offs)
- Teams: 11

Regular season
- Relegated: Kocaeli Women's Basketball

Finals
- Champions: Fenerbahçe (20th title)
- Runners-up: Galatasaray
- Finals MVP: (Turkey) Sevgi Uzun

Statistical leaders
Points	(United States) Rennia Davis	20.5
Rebounds	(United States) Rennia Davis	11.8
Assists	(Belgium) Julie Vanloo	6.9
Steals	(France) Gabby Williams	2.5
Blocks	(Finland) Awak Kuier	2.0
Efficiency	(United States) Rennia Davis	25.9

Records
- Biggest home win: Fenerbahçe 129–43 Çanakkale Bld. (17 January 2026)
- Biggest away win: Çanakkale Bld. 56–100 ÇBK Mersin (27 December 2025)
- Highest scoring: Botaş 144–91 Kocaeli (23 November 2025)

The 2025–26 Women's Basketball Super League was the 46th season of the top division women's basketball league in Turkey since its establishment in 1980. It started on 4 October 2025 with the first round of the regular season and ended on 4 April 2026.

Fenerbahçe are the defending champions.

Fenerbahçe won their twentieth title after sweeping Galatasaray in the finals.

== Format ==
Each team plays each other twice. The top eight teams qualify for the play offs. The quarterfinals and semifinals are played as a best of three series while the final is played as a best of five series.

== Teams ==
Location of teams in 2025–26 Women's Basketball Super League

=== Promotion and relegation (pre-season) ===
▲ Promoted from TKBL	▼ Relegated to TKBL
Edremit Belediyesi Gürespor; Çanakkale Belediyespor; Kocaeli Women's Basketball (replacement)	Tarsus Belediyesi; Bodrum Basketbol; Danilos Pizza (Withdrew) (Note: Danilos Pizza withdrew from the league and their rights were transferred to Kocaeli Women's Basketball.)

=== Venues and locations ===
Location of teams in 2025–26 Women's Basketball Super League in Istanbul.
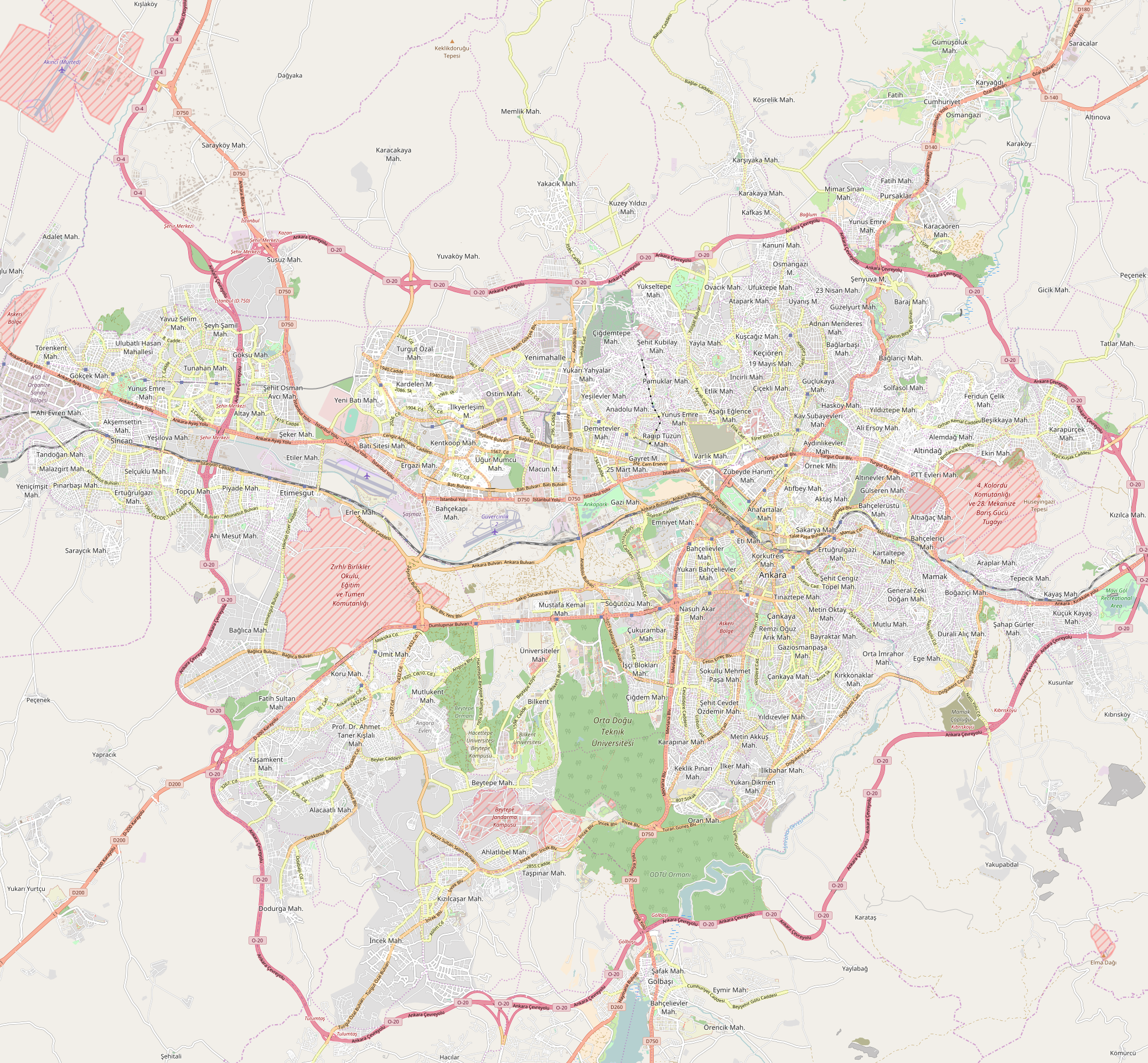
Location of teams in 2025–26 Women's Basketball Super League in Ankara.

Teams	City	Arena	Head coach
Beşiktaş	Istanbul	Akatlar Arena	(Turkey) Ayhan Avcı
Botaş	Ankara	Ankara Arena	(Turkey) Cemal İlker Gözeneli
Çanakkale Belediyespor	Çanakkale	Sporcu Gelişim Merkezi	(Turkey) Tuğçe Canbaz
ÇBK Mersin	Mersin	Servet Tazegül Arena	(Turkey) Ekrem Memnun
Emlak Konut SK	Istanbul	Başakşehir Sports Complex	(Turkey) Murat Alkaş
Fenerbahçe	Istanbul	Metro Enerji Sports Hall	(Spain) Miguel Méndez
Galatasaray	Istanbul	Sinan Erdem Dome	(Turkey) Hasan Fırat Okul
Kayseri Basketbol	Kayseri	Kadir Has Spor Salonu	(Turkey) Emre Özsarı
Kocaeli Women's Basketball	Kocaeli	Şehit Polis Recep Topaloğlu Sports Hall	(Turkey) Efe Güven
Nesibe Aydın	Ankara	TOBB Sport Hall	(Turkey) Erman Okerman
Ormanspor	Ankara	M. Sait Zarifoğlu Sports Hall	(Turkey) Ahmet Furkan Sağlık

== League standings ==
Pos	Team	Pld	W	L	PF	PA	PD	Pts	Qualification
1	Fenerbahçe	20	20	0	1778	1261	+517	40	Advance to playoffs
2	Galatasaray	20	17	3	1482	1183	+299	37	Advance to playoffs
3	Emlak Konut SK	20	14	6	1495	1290	+205	34	Advance to playoffs
4	ÇBK Mersin	20	14	6	1578	1343	+235	34	Advance to playoffs
5	Beşiktaş	20	11	9	1485	1446	+39	31	Advance to playoffs
6	Botaş	20	11	9	1532	1448	+84	31	Advance to playoffs
7	Nesibe Aydın	20	11	9	1514	1478	+36	31	Advance to playoffs
8	Kayseri Basketbol	20	6	14	1328	1502	−174	26	Advance to playoffs
9	Ormanspor	20	4	16	1211	1513	−302	24	
10	Çanakkale Belediyespor	20	2	18	1217	1756	−539	22	
11	Kocaeli Women's Basketball (Note: On 28 November 2025, Kocaeli Women's Basketball withdrew from the league.)	20	0	20	0	400	−400	0	Relegation to TKBL

Source: KBSL
Rules for classification: 1) Points; 2) Points difference; 3) Points scored.

== Results ==
Home \ Away	BES	BOT	CAN	MER	KON	FEN	GAL	KAY	KOC	NES	ORM
Beşiktaş	—	81–87	102–76	76–81	70–99	68–105	67–75	84–75	20–0	83–80	80–72
Botaş	65–83	—	117–79	83–67	76–78	68–90	53–75	93–72	144–91	93–72	93–56
Çanakkale Belediyespor	61–107	66–91	—	56–100	62–91	81–103	64–96	53–82	20–0	74–91	68–74
ÇBK Mersin	76–45	101–89	112–78	—	84–78	70–94	71–75	83–70	20–0	81–63	80–63
Emlak Konut SK	83–84	79–62	85–54	86–80	—	70–88	74–68	84–71	69–57	87–85	109–59
Fenerbahçe	107–78	104–84	129–43	90–81	71–53	—	75–70	118–76	20–0	108–78	109–60
Galatasaray	84–73	90–58	112–52	79–68	64–60	71–75	—	75–52	20–0	87–76	80–68
Kayseri Basketbol	57–86	76–85	91–72	68–98	72–94	79–93	70–95	—	20–0	73–81	72–57
Kocaeli Women's Basketball	0–20	0–20	80–67	0–20	0–20	70–86	0–20	0–20	—	79–85	0–20
Nesibe Aydın	90–83	113–104	90–75	88–90	75–66	69–99	64–79	92–67	20–0	—	73–60
Ormanspor	73–95	66–91	83–63	62–115	65–79	62–80	63–67	59–65	79–54	69–94	—

Source: KBSL
Legend: Blue = home team win; Red = away team win.

== Play offs ==
Note: All times are TRT (UTC+3) as listed by Turkish Basketball Federation.

Quarterfinals
1	Fenerbahçe	113	95	2
8	Kayseri Basketbol	42	59	0
4	ÇBK Mersin	91	99	2
5	Beşiktaş	83	95	0
2	Galatasaray	86	94	2
7	Nesibe Aydın	61	75	0
3	Emlak Konut SK	105	76	2
6	Botaş	96	66	0

Semifinals
1	Fenerbahçe	73	95	2
4	ÇBK Mersin	62	65	0
2	Galatasaray	82	85	2
3	Emlak Konut SK	74	76	0

Final
1	Fenerbahçe	85	77	87	3
2	Galatasaray	70	75	76	0

=== Quarterfinals ===
Team 1	Series	Team 2	Game 1	Game 2	Game 3
Fenerbahçe	2–0	Kayseri Basketbol	113–42	95–59	—
ÇBK Mersin	2–0	Beşiktaş	91–83	99–95	—
Galatasaray	2–0	Nesibe Aydın	86–61	94–75	—
Emlak Konut SK	2–0	Botaş	105–96	76–66	—

==== Fenerbahçe vs Kayseri Basketbol ====
2 March 2026
13:00

Boxscore

Fenerbahçe	113–42	Kayseri Basketbol
Scoring by quarter: 32–14, 29–13, 29–10, 23–5
Pts: Milić 22; Rebs: McCowan 13; Asts: Allemand 7		Pts: Collier 17; Rebs: Dangerfield 6 Asts: Dangerfield 4

Metro Enerji Sports Hall, Istanbul
Attendance: 100
Referees: Fatih Güler, Münevver Özemre, Ali Osman Kanık

3 March 2026
13:00

Boxscore

Kayseri Basketbol	59–95	Fenerbahçe
Scoring by quarter: 17–24, 13–26, 13–23, 16–22
Pts: Arı 18; Rebs: Dangerfield 9 Asts: Arı 5		Pts: Rupert 19; Rebs: McCowan 6 Asts: Allemand 9

Metro Enerji Sports Hall, Istanbul
Attendance: 50
Referees: Orkun Yurttaş, Niyazi Yasin Kahraman, Halil Ata Günal

Fenerbahçe won the series 2–0

==== ÇBK Mersin vs Beşiktaş ====
6 March 2026
15:00

Boxscore

ÇBK Mersin	91–83	Beşiktaş
Scoring by quarter: 24–30, 27–12, 23–17, 17–24
Pts: Burke 20; Rebs: Ural 9 Asts: Iagupova, Akbaş 6		Pts: Fraser 15; Rebs: Fasoula 11; Asts: Bilgiç, Whitcomb 5

Servet Tazegül Arena, Mersin
Attendance: 200
Referees: İbrahim Altıntaş, Ahmet Kemal Digilli, Metehan Alaçam

21 March 2026
19:00

Boxscore

Beşiktaş	95–99 (OT)	ÇBK Mersin
Scoring by quarter: 25–25, 21–20, 20–25, 20–16, Overtime: 9–13
Pts: Fasoula 25; Rebs: Fasoula 16; Asts: Bilgiç 8		Pts: Ural 18; Rebs: Ural 12; Asts: Vanloo 10

Akatlar Arena, Istanbul
Attendance: 350
Referees: Aydın Karaçam, Haldun Çoban, Ömer Sarı

ÇBK Mersin won the series 2–0

==== Galatasaray vs Nesibe Aydın ====
6 March 2026
13:00

Boxscore

Galatasaray	86–61	Nesibe Aydın
Scoring by quarter: 16–22, 28–14, 23–17, 19–8
Pts: Smalls 18; Rebs: Bayram 8 Asts: Fitik 7		Pts: Green 15; Rebs: three players 5 Asts: Davis 6

Sinan Erdem Dome, Istanbul
Attendance: 100
Referees: Ahmet Taner İbin, Nihat Çetin, Erdoğan Çelebi

21 March 2026
16:30

Boxscore

Nesibe Aydın	75–94	Galatasaray
Scoring by quarter: 20–30, 20–19, 20–19, 15–26
Pts: Green 22; Rebs: Davis 13; Asts: Green 6		Pts: Williams 21; Rebs: Williams 8 Asts: Cora 10

TOBB Sport Hall, Ankara
Attendance: 200
Referees: Barış Turgut, Melikşah Mercan, Aygün Akgül

Galatasaray won the series 2–0

==== Emlak Konut SK vs Botaş ====
2 March 2026
15:00

Boxscore

Emlak Konut SK	105–96	Botaş
Scoring by quarter: 26–18, 26–30, 26–24, 27–24
Pts: Thomas 32; Rebs: Başaran 12; Asts: Thomas 7		Pts: Bejedi 28; Rebs: Poyraz 16; Asts: Bejedi 7

Ahmet Cömert Sport Hall, Istanbul
Attendance: 80
Referees: Ozan Gönen, Batuhan Mert Gül, Hakan Gerey

4 March 2026
17:00

Boxscore

Botaş	66–76	Emlak Konut SK
Scoring by quarter: 16–19, 14–20, 19–16, 17–21
Pts: Bejedi 19; Rebs: Poyraz 12; Asts: Günay 5		Pts: Thomas, Macaulay 18; Rebs: Sertoğlu 11; Asts: Thomas 9

Ankara Arena, Ankara
Attendance: 200
Referees: Turgut Işık, Barış Turgut, Ramazan Sezer Baran

Emlak Konut won the series 2–0

=== Semifinals ===
Team 1	Series	Team 2	Game 1	Game 2	Game 3
Fenerbahçe	2–0	ÇBK Mersin	73–62	95–65	—
Galatasaray	2–0	Emlak Konut SK	82–74	85–76	—

==== Fenerbahçe vs ÇBK Mersin ====
23 March 2026
18:30

Boxscore

Fenerbahçe	73–62	ÇBK Mersin
Scoring by quarter: 22–15, 15–16, 21–15, 15–16
Pts: Meesseman 22; Rebs: Meesseman 11; Asts: Allemand 10		Pts: Juškaitė 16; Rebs: Juškaitė 8 Asts: Burke 5

Metro Enerji Sports Hall, Istanbul
Attendance: 250
Referees: Mesut Öztürk, Yarkın Keskin, Özkan Talo

25 March 2026
18:30

Boxscore

ÇBK Mersin	65–95	Fenerbahçe
Scoring by quarter: 16–22, 14–19, 16–31, 19–23
Pts: Juškaitė 17; Rebs: Ural, Juškaitė 8 Asts: Vanloo 6		Pts: Williams, Meesseman 19; Rebs: Meesseman 12; Asts: Allemand 12

Servet Tazegül Arena, Mersin
Attendance: 1,600
Referees: Önder Yılmaz, Hüseyin Çamcı, Niyazi Yasin Kahraman

Fenerbahçe won the series 2–0

==== Galatasaray vs Emlak Konut SK ====
24 March 2026
19:00

Boxscore

Galatasaray	82–74	Emlak Konut SK
Scoring by quarter: 22–21, 28–19, 18–15, 14–19
Pts: Kuier 17; Rebs: Williams 9 Asts: Erdoğan 11		Pts: Thomas 15; Rebs: Macaulay, Ndour 7 Asts: Thomas 7

Sinan Erdem Dome, Istanbul
Attendance: 553
Referees: Yiğit Gönültaş, İsmail Binbir, Burak Erkan

26 March 2026
17:00

Boxscore

Emlak Konut SK	76–85	Galatasaray
Scoring by quarter: 15–21, 10–26, 16–16, 35–22
Pts: Thomas 38; Rebs: Ndour 11; Asts: Thomas 4		Pts: Kuier 17; Rebs: Bayram 8 Asts: Fitik 5

Başakşehir Spor Kompleksi, Istanbul
Attendance: 180
Referees: Berk Kurtulmuş, Abdullah Koputan, Furkan Keseratar

Galatasaray won the series 2–0

=== Final ===
Team 1	Series	Team 2	Game 1	Game 2	Game 3	Game 4	Game 5
Fenerbahçe	3–0	Galatasaray	85–70	77–75	87–76	—	—

==== Fenerbahçe vs Galatasaray ====
29 March 2026
16:00

Boxscore

Fenerbahçe	85–70	Galatasaray
Scoring by quarter: 18–17, 21–14, 32–17, 14–22
Pts: Rupert 19; Rebs: Meesseman 8 Asts: Meesseman 6		Pts: Johannès 22; Rebs: Kuier 6 Asts: Fitik, Erdoğan 4

Metro Enerji Sports Hall, Istanbul
Attendance: 871
Referees: İbrahim Altıntaş, Ahmet Taner İbin, Ahmet Kemal Digilli

1 April 2026
19:30

Boxscore

Fenerbahçe	77–75	Galatasaray
Scoring by quarter: 29–17, 14–19, 20–19, 14–20
Pts: Meesseman 20; Rebs: Meesseman 12; Asts: Allemand 8		Pts: Kuier 18; Rebs: Kuier 5 Asts: Erdoğan 6

Metro Enerji Sports Hall, Istanbul
Attendance: 781
Referees: Aydın Karaçam, Fatih Güler, Samet Biner

4 April 2026
16:00

Boxscore

Galatasaray	76–87	Fenerbahçe
Scoring by quarter: 17–22, 23–23, 13–24, 23–18
Pts: Johannès 17; Rebs: Kuier, Williams 6 Asts: Johannès 4		Pts: Rupert 24; Rebs: Rupert 10; Asts: Allemand 13

Sinan Erdem Dome, Istanbul
Attendance: 1,470
Referees: Orkun Yurttaş, Ozan Gönen, Berk Kurtulmuş

Fenerbahçe won the series 3–0

Champions of Turkey

Fenerbahçe
20th title

== Statistical leaders ==
=== Efficiency ===
Pos	Player	Club	PIR
1	(United States) Rennia Davis	Nesibe Aydın	25.90
2	(Belgium) Emma Meesseman	Fenerbahçe	25.26
3	(France) Iliana Rupert	Fenerbahçe	20.43
4	(Greece) Mariella Fasoula	Beşiktaş	19.74
5	(United States) Kiana Williams	Botaş	19.08

=== Points ===
Pos	Player	Club	PPG
1	(United States) Rennia Davis	Nesibe Aydın	20.45
2	(United States) Morgan Green	Nesibe Aydın	19.21
3	(United States) Kiana Williams	Botaş	18.58
4	(Brazil) Damiris Dantas	Botaş	18.37
5	(Cameroon) Jessica Thomas	Emlak Konut SK	18.05

=== Rebounds ===
Pos	Player	Club	RPG
1	(United States) Rennia Davis	Nesibe Aydın	11.75
2	(Turkey) Tuba Poyraz	Botaş	9.59
3	(Nigeria) Victoria Macaulay	Emlak Konut SK	7.91
4	(Greece) Mariella Fasoula	Beşiktaş	7.89
5	(Belgium) Emma Meesseman	Fenerbahçe	7.63

=== Assists ===
Pos	Player	Club	APG
1	(Belgium) Julie Vanloo	ÇBK Mersin	6.93
2	(Finland) Sara Bejedi	Botaş	6.70
3	(Belgium) Julie Allemand	Fenerbahçe	6.33
4	(Belgium) Emma Meesseman	Fenerbahçe	6.05
5	(Cameroon) Jessica Thomas	Emlak Konut SK	6.05

=== Steals ===
Pos	Player	Club	SPG
1	(France) Gabby Williams	Fenerbahçe	2.50
2	(United States) Brooque Williams	Kayseri Basketbol	2.08
3	(United States) Crystal Dangerfield	Kayseri Basketbol	1.80
4	(Cameroon) Jessica Thomas	Emlak Konut SK	1.64
5	(Turkey) Kennedy Burke	ÇBK Mersin	1.55

=== Blocks ===
Pos	Player	Club	BPG
1	(Finland) Awak Kuier	Galatasaray	1.96
2	(Greece) Mariella Fasoula	Beşiktaş	0.95
3	(United States) Elizabeth Williams	Galatasaray	0.71
4	(Germany) Luisa Geiselsöder	ÇBK Mersin	0.62
5	(Turkey) Melek Uzunoğlu	Emlak Konut SK	0.59

Source: Kadınlar Basketbol Süper Ligi

== Awards ==
All official awards of the 2025–26 Kadınlar Basketbol Süper Ligi.

=== MVP of the Round ===
Gameday	Player	Team	EFF	Ref.
1	(Greece) Mariella Fasoula	Beşiktaş	39	
2	(Turkey) Ayşegül Günay	Botaş	28	
3	(France) Iliana Rupert	Fenerbahçe	28	
4	(United States) Rennia Davis	Nesibe Aydın	40	
5	(Belgium) Emma Meesseman	Fenerbahçe	42	
6	(United States) Morgan Green	Nesibe Aydın	36	
7	(United States) Kiana Williams	Botaş	53	
8	(United States) Kristine Anigwe	Ormanspor	31	
9	(Brazil) Damiris Dantas	Botaş	35	
10	(Nigeria) Victoria Macaulay	Emlak Konut SK	30	
11	(Australia) Sami Whitcomb	Beşiktaş	26	
12	(Hungary) Dorka Juhász	Galatasaray	29	
13	(Turkey) Tuba Poyraz	Botaş	35	
14	(Turkey) Kennedy Burke	ÇBK Mersin	40	
15	(Brazil) Damiris Dantas (x2)	Botaş	39	
16	(Serbia) Nikolina Milić	Fenerbahçe	41	
17	(France) Gabby Williams	Fenerbahçe	32	
18	(United States) Rennia Davis (x2)	Nesibe Aydın	49	
19	(Turkey) Alperi Onar	Fenerbahçe	25	
20	(United States) Kelsey Bone	Nesibe Aydın	36	
21	(France) Iliana Rupert (x2)	Fenerbahçe	31	
22	(France) Iliana Rupert (x3)	Fenerbahçe	29	

=== Starting Five of the Round ===
Round	PG	SG	SF	PF	C	Ref.
1	(United States) Crystal Dangerfield (Kayseri Basketbol)	(United States) Yvonne Turner (Nesibe Aydın)	(Turkey) Elif Bayram (Galatasaray)	(Belgium) Emma Meesseman (Fenerbahçe)	(Greece) Mariella Fasoula (Beşiktaş)	
2	(Turkey) Ayşegül Günay (Botaş)	(Turkey) Büşra Akbaş (ÇBK Mersin)	(Belgium) Julie Allemand (Fenerbahçe)	(Belgium) Antonia Delaere (Emlak Konut SK)	(United States) Elizabeth Williams (Galatasaray)	
3	(Turkey) Pelin Bilgiç (Beşiktaş)	(United States) Marquesha Davis (Botaş)	(Hungary) Dorka Juhász (Galatasaray)	(United States) Rennia Davis (Nesibe Aydın)	(France) Iliana Rupert (Fenerbahçe)	
4	(Cameroon) Jessica Thomas (Emlak Konut SK)	(Slovenia) Teja Oblak (Galatasaray)	(Nigeria) Amy Okonkwo (Beşiktaş)	(United States) Rennia Davis (Nesibe Aydın)	(United States) Kristine Anigwe (Ormanspor)	
5	(Cameroon) Jessica Thomas (Emlak Konut SK)	(Turkey) Merve Arı (Kayseri Basketbol)	(Belgium) Emma Meesseman (Fenerbahçe)	(Turkey) Kennedy Burke (ÇBK Mersin)	(Finland) Awak Kuier (Galatasaray)	
6	(Belgium) Julie Vanloo (ÇBK Mersin)	(United States) Morgan Green (Nesibe Aydın)	(United States) Jazmine Jones (Kocaeli Women's Basketball)	(Cameroon) Jessica Thomas (Emlak Konut SK)	(Spain) Megan Gustafson (Fenerbahçe)	
7	(Cameroon) Jessica Thomas (Emlak Konut SK)	(United States) Kiana Williams (Botaş)	(United States) Kayla McBride (Fenerbahçe)	(Turkey) Kennedy Burke (ÇBK Mersin)	(United States) Kelsey Bone (Nesibe Aydın)	
8	(Turkey) Kübra Erat (Ormanspor)	(Lithuania) Laura Juškaitė (ÇBK Mersin)	(Spain) Astou Ndour (Emlak Konut SK)	(Belgium) Emma Meesseman (Fenerbahçe)	(United States) Kristine Anigwe (Ormanspor)	
9	(Belgium) Julie Vanloo (ÇBK Mersin)	(Turkey) Kennedy Burke (ÇBK Mersin)	(United States) Rennia Davis (Nesibe Aydın)	(Belgium) Emma Meesseman (Fenerbahçe)	(Brazil) Damiris Dantas (Botaş)	
10	(Turkey) Sevgi Uzun (Fenerbahçe)	(Turkey) Tuba Poyraz (Botaş)	(Belgium) Emma Meesseman (Fenerbahçe)	(Nigeria) Victoria Macaulay (Emlak Konut SK)	(Finland) Awak Kuier (Galatasaray)	
11	(Australia) Sami Whitcomb (Beşiktaş)	(Turkey) Meltem Yıldızhan (Beşiktaş)	(France) Iliana Rupert (Fenerbahçe)	(Nigeria) Victoria Macaulay (Emlak Konut SK)	(Finland) Awak Kuier (Galatasaray)	
12	(United States) Kiana Williams (Botaş)	(United States) Brooque Williams (Kayseri Basketbol)	(France) Gabby Williams (Fenerbahçe)	(Hungary) Dorka Juhász (Galatasaray)	(Brazil) Damiris Dantas (Botaş)	
13	(Turkey) Asena Yalçın (ÇBK Mersin)	(Turkey) Tuba Poyraz (Botaş)	(Turkey) Ayşe Cora (Galatasaray)	(Spain) Megan Gustafson (Fenerbahçe)	(Australia) Lauren Scherf (Botaş)	
14	(Turkey) Derin Erdoğan (Galatasaray)	(Australia) Sami Whitcomb (Beşiktaş)	(United States) Rennia Davis (Nesibe Aydın)	(Turkey) Elif Bayram (Galatasaray)	(Turkey) Kennedy Burke (ÇBK Mersin)	
15	(United States) Kiana Williams (Botaş)	(Turkey) Melek Uzunoğlu (Emlak Konut SK)	(Greece) Mariella Fasoula (Beşiktaş)	(Brazil) Damiris Dantas (Botaş)	(Finland) Awak Kuier (Galatasaray)	
16	(United States) Crystal Dangerfield (Kayseri Basketbol)	(Turkey) Melek Uzunoğlu (Emlak Konut SK)	(Turkey) Kennedy Burke (ÇBK Mersin)	(Serbia) Nikolina Milić (Fenerbahçe)	(Finland) Awak Kuier (Galatasaray)	
17	(Turkey) Sevgi Uzun (Fenerbahçe)	(Australia) Sami Whitcomb (Beşiktaş)	(France) Gabby Williams (Fenerbahçe)	(Turkey) Kennedy Burke (ÇBK Mersin)	(Hungary) Dorka Juhász (Galatasaray)	
18	(United States) Rennia Davis (Nesibe Aydın)	(United States) Kayla McBride (Fenerbahçe)	(Turkey) Sinem Ataş (ÇBK Mersin)	(United States) Brianna Fraser (Beşiktaş)	(Belgium) Emma Meesseman (Fenerbahçe)	
19	(Turkey) Alperi Onar (Fenerbahçe)	(Turkey) Kübra Erat (Ormanspor)	(Turkey) Berfin Sertoğlu (Emlak Konut SK)	(Turkey) Kennedy Burke (ÇBK Mersin)	(Belgium) Emma Meesseman (Fenerbahçe)	
20	(Cameroon) Jessica Thomas (Emlak Konut SK)	(Finland) Sara Bejedi (Botaş)	(Turkey) Olcay Çakır (Fenerbahçe)	(France) Iliana Rupert (Fenerbahçe)	(United States) Kelsey Bone (Nesibe Aydın)	
21	(Turkey) İdil Yeniçulha (Botaş)	(United States) Kayla McBride (Fenerbahçe)	(France) Iliana Rupert (Fenerbahçe)	(Turkey) Zeynep Şevval Gül (Galatasaray)	(United States) Kelsey Bone (Nesibe Aydın)	
22	(Turkey) Berfin Sertoğlu (Emlak Konut SK)	(United States) Kayla McBride (Fenerbahçe)	(Turkey) Meltem Yıldızhan (Beşiktaş)	(Turkey) Elif Bayram (Galatasaray)	(France) Iliana Rupert (Fenerbahçe)	

=== Featured Player of the Round ===
Gameday	Player	Team	EFF	Ref.
1	(United States) Kelsey Bone	Nesibe Aydın	22	
2	(Turkey) Ayşenaz Harma	ÇBK Mersin	20	
3	(Turkey) Tuba Poyraz	Botaş	22	
4	(Turkey) Gökşen Fitik	Galatasaray	14	
5	(United States) Tiffany Hayes	ÇBK Mersin	21	
6	(Turkey) Sinem Ataş	ÇBK Mersin	24	
7	(Turkey) Ceren Akpınar	Emlak Konut SK	17	
8	(Turkey) Alperi Onar	Fenerbahçe	25	
9	(Turkey) Sevgi Uzun	Fenerbahçe	20	
10	(Turkey) Ceren Akpınar (x2)	Emlak Konut SK	16	
11	(Belgium) Antonia Delaere	Emlak Konut SK	17	
12	(France) Iliana Rupert	Fenerbahçe	23	
13	(Turkey) Gökşen Fitik (x2)	Galatasaray	13	
14	(Turkey) Pelin Bilgiç	Beşiktaş	21	
15	(Turkey) Ayşe Cora	Galatasaray	13	
16	(Belgium) Julie Vanloo	ÇBK Mersin	22	
17	(United States) Brianna Fraser	Beşiktaş	21	
18	(Australia) Sami Whitcomb	Beşiktaş	20	
19	(Turkey) Manolya Kurtulmuş	ÇBK Mersin	20	
20	(Turkey) Berfin Sertoğlu	Emlak Konut SK	16	
21	(United States) Rennia Davis	Nesibe Aydın	28	
22	(Turkey) Ferda Yıldız	Emlak Konut SK	19	
