= Iliana Rupert =

French basketball player (born 2001)

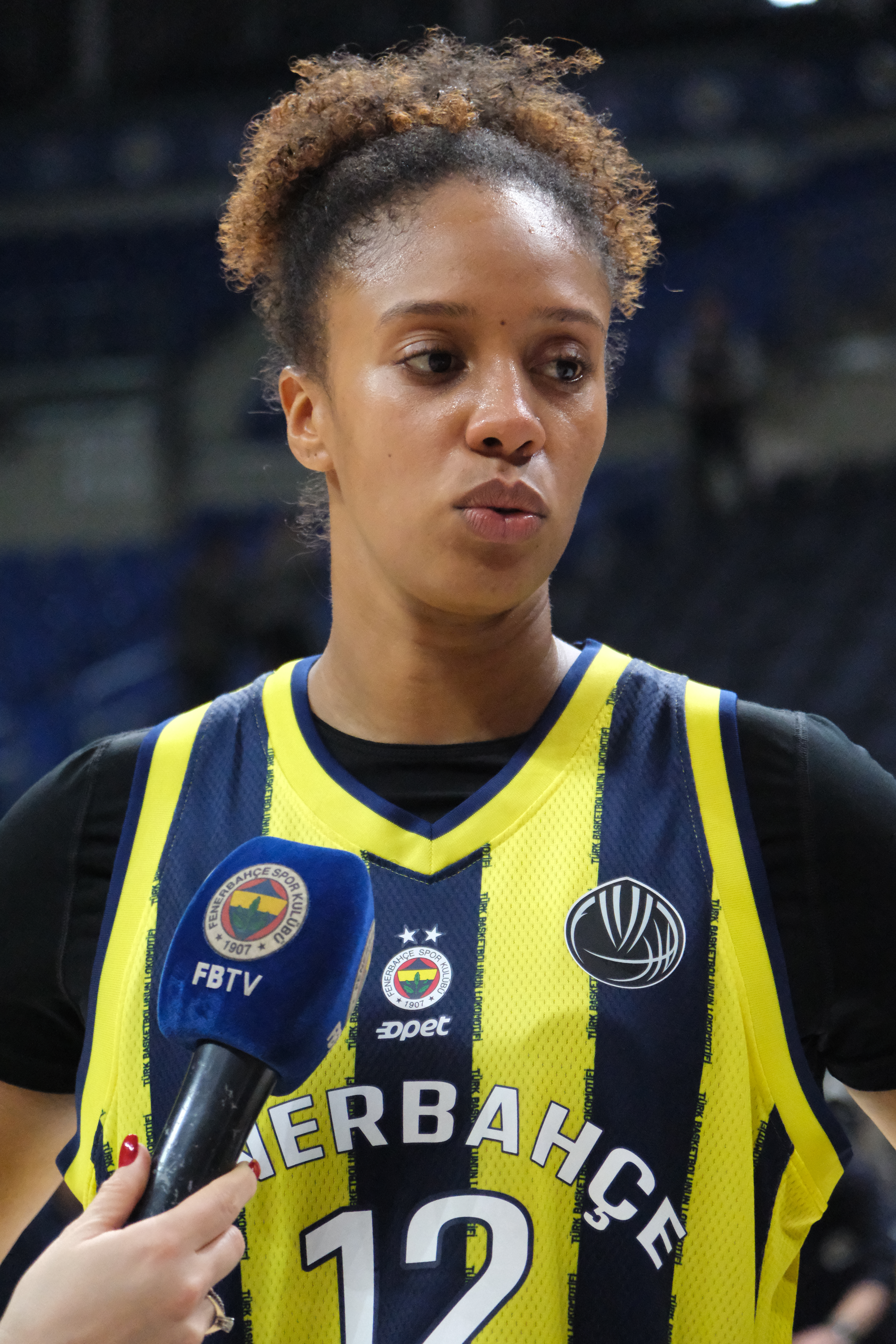
- Rupert with Fenerbahçe in 2025

No. 12 – Golden State Valkyries
- Position: Center
- League: WNBA

Personal information
- Born: 12 July 2001 (age 25) Sèvres, France
- Listed height: 1.94 m (6 ft 4 in)
- Listed weight: 189 lb (86 kg)

Career information
- WNBA draft: 2021: 1st round, 12th overall pick
- Drafted by: Las Vegas Aces

Career history
- 2018–2022: Tango Bourges Basket
- 2021–2022: Las Vegas Aces
- 2022–2024: Virtus Bologna
- 2023: Atlanta Dream
- 2024–2025: Çukurova Basketbol
- 2025–present: Golden State Valkyries
- 2025–present: Fenerbahçe

Career highlights
- 2x WNBA champion (2022, 2026); Commissioner’s Cup champion (2022); EuroLeague champion (2026); Turkish Super League champion (2026); Turkish Presidential Cup champion (2025); 2× Turkish Cup champion (2025, 2026); EuroCup Women Final Four MVP (2022)
- Stats at Basketball Reference
Medals
women's basketball
Representing (France) France
Olympic Games
Silver medal – second place	2024 Paris	Team
Bronze medal – third place	2020 Tokyo	Team
EuroBasket
Silver medal – second place	2019 Serbia/Latvia
Silver medal – second place	2021 Spain/France
Bronze medal – third place	2023 Israel/Slovenia

Iliana Rupert (born 12 July 2001) is a French professional basketball player for the Golden State Valkyries of the Women’s National Basketball Association and Fenerbahçe of the Turkish Super League.

== Professional career ==
=== Europe ===
Rupert signed with Fenerbahçe of the Turkish Super League for the 2025–26 season.

=== WNBA ===
On 6 December 2024, Rupert was selected as the Golden State Valkyries' pick from the Atlanta Dream's roster in the 2024 WNBA expansion draft. She signed her contract with the Valkyries on 16 July 2025.

On April 7, 2026, Rupert signed a multi-year contract with the Golden State Valkyries, ahead of the 2026 WNBA season.

== International career ==
She represented France at the FIBA Women's EuroBasket 2019.

== Personal life ==
Rupert is the daughter of Thierry Rupert, former power forward of the French national team. She is of Martiniquais and Moroccan descent. Her brother is Rayan Rupert, of the Philadelphia 76ers.

== WNBA career statistics ==
Legend
GP	Games played	GS	Games started	MPG	Minutes per game	RPG	Rebounds per game
APG	Assists per game	SPG	Steals per game	BPG	Blocks per game	PPG	Points per game
TO	Turnovers per game	FG%	Field-goal percentage	3P%	3-point field-goal percentage	FT%	Free-throw percentage
**Bold**	Career best	°	League leader

†	Denotes seasons in which Rupert won a WNBA championship

=== Regular season ===
Year	Team	GP	GS	MPG	FG%	3P%	FT%	RPG	APG	SPG	BPG	TO	PPG
2022^{†}	Las Vegas	17	0	13.1	**.463**	.368	.333	2.3	0.9	0.4	0.0	0.5	3.8
2023	Atlanta	20	0	7.9	.353	.273	.625	2.0	0.5	0.4	0.4	0.5	1.8
2025	Golden State	**21**	**11**	**23.1**	.438	**.442**	**.938**°	**3.9**	**1.6**	**0.6**	**0.6**	**1.0**	**9.3**
Career	3 years, 3 teams	58	11	14.9	.432	.402	.778	2.7	1.0	0.5	0.3	0.7	5.1

=== Playoffs ===
Year	Team	GP	GS	MPG	FG%	3P%	FT%	RPG	APG	SPG	BPG	TO	PPG
2022^{†}	Las Vegas	**7**	0	7.0	.313	**.357**	.000	0.4	0.0	0.0	0.1	**0.4**	2.1
2023	Atlanta	1	0	14.0	**1.000**	.000	.000	**3.0**	0.0	0.0	**1.0**	2.0	2.0
2025	Golden State	2	**1**	**24.0**	.429	.333	.000	2.5	**3.0**	0.0	**1.0**	2.5	**4.0**
Career	3 years, 3 teams	10	1	11.1	.375	.350	.000	1.1	0.6	0.0	0.4	1.0	2.5
