= Ayşenaz Harma =

Turkish basketball player (born 2007)

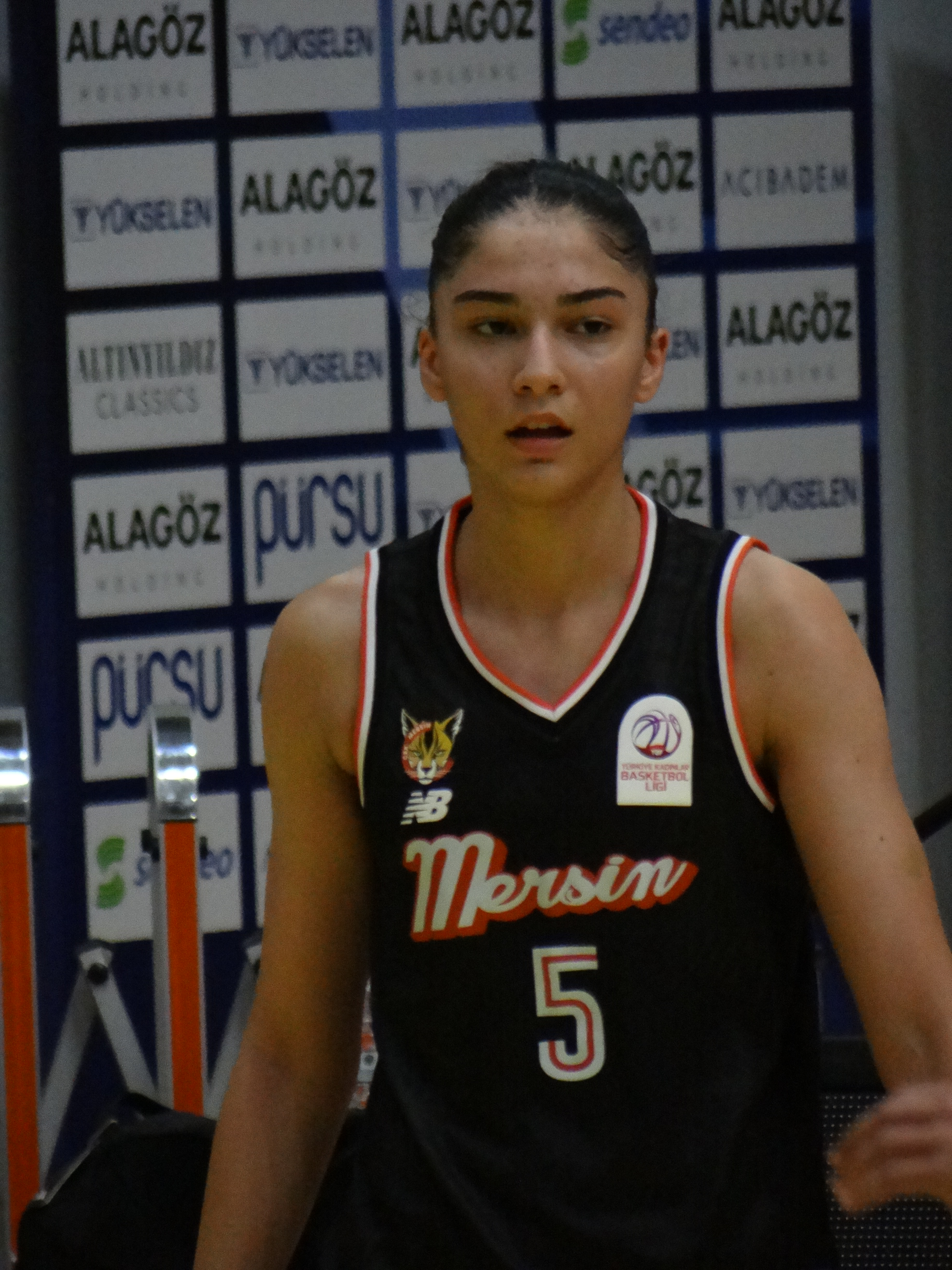
- Ayşenaz Harma of ÇBK Mersin

No. 5 – ÇBK Mersin
- Position: Power forward
- League: Turkish Super League; EuroLeague Women

Personal information
- Born: 22 November 2007 (age 18) Turkey
- Listed height: 188 cm (6 ft 2 in)

Career history
- 2024–2025: Bodrum Basketbol
- 2025–present: ÇBK Mersin

Career highlights
- EuroCup winner (2026); FIBA U16 EuroBasket Div. B runner-up (2022); Turkish Presidential Cup runner-up (2025)

Ayşenaz Harma (born 22 November 2007) is a Turkish basketball player for ÇBK Mersin. She was part of the Turkey national U-16 and U-18 teams.

== Cllub career ==
Harma was grown from the infrastructure of ÇBK Mersin.

She was in the 2024–25 season with Bodrum Basketbol.

Mersin Basketbol announced on 28 September 2025 that Harma of ÇBK Mersin joins the team for the 2025– 26 Türkiye Basketbol Ligi season on a double-license base. She furthermore played for ÇBK Mersin. With ÇBK Mersin, she played final play-offs series in the 2025– 26 League against Fenerbahçe.

With ÇBK Mersin, she played at the 2025–26 EuroLeague Women. Her team became champion of the 2025 Turkish Women's Basketball Cup, and played so at the 2025 Turkish Women's Basketball Presidential Cup, which they finished as runners-up. She became winner of the 2025–26 EuroCup Women.

== International career ==
Harma was included in the Turkey girls' national U-16 team, and played a friendly match tournament against Bulgaria for preparation of the 2023 FIBA U16 Women's European Championship.. She was part of the Turkey women's national U-18 team. She took part at the 2025 FIBA U18 Women's EuroBasket in Palma, Spain.
