= 2016 FIBA Europe SuperCup Women =

Tournament details
- Arena: Palacium hall Villeneuve-d'Ascq, France
- Dates: 20 October 2016

Final positions
- Champions: (Russia) UMMC Ekaterinburg
- Runners-up: (France) ESB Villeneuve-d'Ascq

Awards and statistics
- Top scorer(s): (Ukraine) Alina Iagupova (Russia) Olga Arteshina (both 17 points)

The 2016 FIBA Europe SuperCup Women was the sixth edition of the FIBA Europe SuperCup Women. It was held on 20 October 2016 at the Palacium hall in Villeneuve-d'Ascq, France.

== Time ==
Times are CET (UTC+1).

== Final ==
20 October 2016
20:30

Report

ESB Villeneuve-d'Ascq (France)	63–66	(Russia) UMMC Ekaterinburg
Scoring by quarter: 20:22, 10:17, 13:15, 20:12
Pts: Iagupova 17; Rebs: Ayayi, Gaye 7 Asts: Brémont 5		Pts: Arteshina 17; Rebs: Griner 11; Asts: Barič 9

Palacium hall, Villeneuve-d'Ascq
Attendance: 1.790
Referees: Sonia Teixeira (POR), Andrada Monika Csender (ROU), Kate Webb (ENG)

2016 FIBA Europe SuperCup Women winner

UMMC Ekaterinburg
2nd Title
