= 2019 FIBA Europe SuperCup Women =

Tournament details
- Arena: DIVS Sport Hall; Yekaterinburg, Russia
- Dates: 10 October 2019

Final positions
- Champions: (Russia) UMMC Ekaterinburg
- Runners-up: (Russia) Nadezhda Orenburg

The 2019 FIBA Europe SuperCup Women was the 9th edition of the FIBA Europe SuperCup Women. It was held on 10 October 2019 at the DIVS Sport Hall in Yekaterinburg, Russia.

== Final ==
10 October 2019
19:00 (UTC+5)

Boxscore

UMMC Ekaterinburg (Russia)	87–67	(Russia) Nadezhda Orenburg
Scoring by quarter: 21–19, 17–17, 27–14, 22–17
Pts: Griner 28; Rebs: Griner 11; Asts: Vandersloot 10		Pts: Wheeler 20; Rebs: Raincock-Ekunwe, Wheeler 5 Asts: Wheeler 9

DIVS Sport Hall, Yekaterinburg
Attendance: 4,400
Referees: Özlem Yalman (TUR), Jelena Tomić (CRO), Alexandra Stan (ROU)

2019 FIBA Europe SuperCup Women winner

UMMC Ekaterinburg
4th title
