= 2018 FIBA Europe SuperCup Women =

Tournament details
- Arena: DIVS Sport Hall; Yekaterinburg, Russia
- Dates: 17 October 2018

Final positions
- Champions: (Russia) UMMC Ekaterinburg
- Runners-up: (Turkey) Galatasaray

The 2018 FIBA Europe SuperCup Women was the 8th edition of the FIBA Europe SuperCup Women. It was held on 17 October 2018 at the DIVS Sport Hall in Yekaterinburg, Russia.

== Final ==
17 October 2018
19:00 (UTC+5)

Boxscore

UMMC Ekaterinburg (Russia)	79–40	(Turkey) Galatasaray
Scoring by quarter: 22–8, 16–22, 22–6, 19–4
Pts: McBride 18; Rebs: Torrens, Vadeeva 6 Asts: Vandersloot 6		Pts: Macaulay 13; Rebs: Macaulay 10; Asts: three players 2

DIVS Sport Hall, Yekaterinburg
Attendance: 4 200
Referees: Jasmina Juras (SRB), Andrada Csender (ROU), Esperanza Mendoza (ESP)

2018 FIBA Europe SuperCup Women winner

UMMC Ekaterinburg
3rd Title
