= 2023–24 Women's Basketball Super League =

Women's Basketball Super League
- Season: 2023–24
- Dates: October 2023 – April 2024
- Games played: 210 + Playoff games
- Teams: 15

Finals
- Champions: Fenerbahçe (18th title)
- Runners-up: ÇBK Mersin Yenişehir Bld.

Seasons
- ← 2022–23 2024–25 →

The 2023–24 Women's Basketball Super League (Turkish: Kadınlar Basketbol Süper Ligi), officially called the ING Women's Basketball Super League, was the 44th edition of the top-tier level professional women's basketball league in Turkey. The season ended with Fenerbahçe winning their sixth straight championship, defeating ÇBK Mersin Yenişehir Bld. in the play-off finals.

== Regular season ==
=== League table ===
Pos	Team	Pld	W	L	GF	GA	GD	Pts	Qualification or relegation
1	Fenerbahçe Alagöz Holding	28	28	0	2621	1856	+765	56	Qualification to playoffs
2	Beşiktaş Boa	28	20	8	2389	2096	+293	48	Qualification to playoffs
3	OGM Ormanspor	28	19	9	2250	2154	+96	47	Qualification to playoffs
4	Mehmet Kavan Yapı İzmit Belediyespor	28	19	9	2326	2167	+159	47	Qualification to playoffs
5	Galatasaray Çağdaş Faktoring	28	18	10	2407	2289	+118	46	Qualification to playoffs
6	ÇBK Mersin	28	17	11	2263	1998	+265	45	Qualification to playoffs
7	Nesibe Aydın	28	15	13	2248	2116	+132	43	Qualification to playoffs
8	BOTAŞ	28	14	14	2122	2109	+13	42	Qualification to playoffs
9	Melikgazi Kayseri Basketbol	28	12	16	2352	2314	+38	40	
10	Emlak Konut	28	11	17	2091	2225	−134	39	
11	Antalya Toroslar Basketbol	28	10	18	2220	2435	−215	38	
12	İlkem Yapı Tarsus Spor	28	9	19	2120	2248	−128	37	
13	Bursa Uludağ Basketbol	28	10	18	2076	2252	−176	38	
14	Çankaya Üniversitesi	28	8	20	2315	2602	−287	36	
15	Hatay BB	28	0	28	2023	2962	−939	28	

Source: TBF

== Playoffs ==
Quarterfinals
1	Fenerbahçe Alagöz Holding	89	89	X
8	BOTAŞ	56	73	X
4	Mehmet Kavan Yapı İzmit Belediyespor	64	95	75
5	Galatasaray Çağdaş Faktoring	90	83	78
2	Beşiktaş Boa	89	98	X
7	Nesibe Aydın	71	93	X
3	OGM Ormanspor	75	76	X
6	ÇBK Mersin	80	85	X

Semifinals
1	Fenerbahçe Alagöz Holding	83	109	X	X	X
5	Galatasaray Çağdaş Faktoring	66	71	X	X	X
2	Beşiktaş Boa	67	64	X	X	X
6	ÇBK Mersin	77	91	X	X	X

Finals
1	Fenerbahçe Alagöz Holding	99	85	80	X	X
6	ÇBK Mersin	76	64	56	X	X
