= Turkish Women's Basketball Presidential Cup =

- Current season, competition or edition: 2025 Turkish Women's Basketball Presidential Cup
- Sport: Basketball
- Founded: 1992
- First season: 1993
- No. of teams: 2
- Country: Turkey
- Confederation: FIBA Europe
- Most recent champion: Fenerbahçe (14th title)
- Most titles: Fenerbahçe (14 titles)
- Related competitions: Turkish Super League; Turkish Cup
- Website: tbf.org.tr

The Turkish Women's Basketball Presidential Cup (Turkish: Kadınlar Cumhurbaşkanlığı Kupası), or Turkish Women's Basketball Super Cup, is the professional basketball women's club super cup competition that takes place each year in Turkey. It usually takes place between the winners of the Turkish Women's Super League and the winners of the Turkish Cup. If the same team wins both the Turkish League and the Turkish Cup in the same season, then the competition takes place between the two league finalists from the Turkish League.

== Performance by club ==
| Club | Titles |
|---|---|
| Fenerbahçe | 14 |
| Galatasaray | 8 |
| Botaş | 2 |
| Hatay Büyükşehir Belediyespor | 2 |
| Beşiktaş | 1 |
| Mersin Büyükşehir Belediyespor | 1 |
| Near East University | 1 |
| Çukurova Basketbol | 1 |

== Winners ==
| Year | Winners | Score | Runners-up | MVP |
|---|---|---|---|---|
| 1993 | Galatasaray | 102–71 | Botaş | (United States) Clarissa Davis |
| 1994 | Galatasaray | 94–63 | Brisa | |
| 1995 | Galatasaray | 85–67 | Fenerbahçe | (United States) Clarissa Davis |
| 1996 | Galatasaray | 80–51 | Brisa | (Turkey) Handan Özbek |
| 1997 | Galatasaray | 79–58 | Botaş | (Turkey) Çelen Kılınç |
| 1998 | Galatasaray | 79–59 | Brisa | (Croatia) Korana Zanze |
| 1999 | Fenerbahçe | 45–43 | Galatasaray | (United States) Bridgette Gordon |
| 2000 | Fenerbahçe | 67–65 | Galatasaray | (United States) Tamecka Dixon |
| 2001 | Fenerbahçe | 72–65 | Botaş | (United States) Danielle McCulley |
| 2002 | Botaş | 62–54 | Fenerbahçe | (Croatia) Katarina Maloča |
| 2003 | Botaş | 75–60 | Erdemirspor | (United States) Lindsay Taylor |
| 2004 | Fenerbahçe | 79–72 | Erdemirspor | (Turkey) Şaziye İvegin |
| 2005 | Fenerbahçe | 61–52 | Beşiktaş | (United States) Tan White |
| 2006 | Beşiktaş | 79–72 | Fenerbahçe | (United States) Stacey Lovelace |
| 2007 | Fenerbahçe | 65–58 | Beşiktaş | (United States) Cappie Pondexter |
| 2008 | Galatasaray | 71–55 | Fenerbahçe | (United States) Seimone Augustus |
| 2009 | Mersin BB | 86–74 | Fenerbahçe | (United States) Ivory Latta |
| 2010 | Fenerbahçe | 75–58 | Galatasaray | (Turkey) Nevriye Yılmaz |
| 2011 | Galatasaray Medical Park | 85–77 | Fenerbahçe | (United States) Tina Charles |
| 2012 | Fenerbahçe | 62–45 | Galatasaray | (United States) Angel McCoughtry |
| 2013 | Fenerbahçe | 63–53 | Galatasaray | (United States) Cappie Pondexter |
| 2014 | Fenerbahçe | 56–48 | Galatasaray | (United States) Tina Charles |
| 2015 | Fenerbahçe | 52–48 | Galatasaray | (United States) Jantel Lavender |
| 2016 | Hatay BB | 60–55 | Fenerbahçe | (Belgium) Katsiaryna Snytsina |
| 2017 | Near East University | 75–59 | Fenerbahçe | (United States) Kayla McBride |
| 2018 | Hatay BB | 61–47 | Fenerbahçe | (Belgium) Hind Ben Abdelkader |
| 2019 | Fenerbahçe | 86–62 | ÇBK Mersin | (Ukraine) Alina Iagupova |
| 2020 | Cancelled due to the COVID-19 pandemic. | | | |
| 2021 | Cancelled due to the COVID-19 pandemic. | | | |
| 2022 | ÇBK Mersin | 84–78 | Fenerbahçe | (United States) Chelsea Gray |
| 2023 | Cancelled after the 2023 Turkey–Syria earthquake. | | | |
| 2024 | Fenerbahçe | 65–64 | ÇBK Mersin | (Belgium) Emma Meesseman |
| 2025 | Fenerbahçe | 104–77 | ÇBK Mersin | (Belgium) Emma Meesseman |
| 2026 | | | | |

== See also ==
- Men's
  - Turkish Men's Basketball League
  - Turkish Men's Basketball Cup
  - Turkish Men's Basketball Presidential Cup
- Women's
  - Turkish Women's Super League
  - Turkish Women's Basketball Cup
  - Turkish Women's Basketball Presidential Cup
