= 2024–25 Women's Basketball Super League =

Women's basketball league in Turkey

Women's Basketball Super League
- Season: 2024–25
- Dates: Regular season: 28 September 2024 – 16 March 2025; Play Offs: 26 March – 20 April 2025
- Teams: 12

Regular season
- Season MVP: (Belgium) Emma Meesseman
- Relegated: Tarsus Belediyesi; Bodrum Basketbol

Finals
- Champions: Fenerbahçe (19th title)
- Runners-up: ÇBK Mersin
- Finals MVP: (Belgium) Emma Meesseman

Statistical leaders
Points	(United States) Jillian Alleyne	18.6
Rebounds	(United States) Jillian Alleyne	13.8
Assists	(Belgium) Julie Vanloo	8.4
Steals	(France) Gabby Williams	2.6
Blocks	(South Korea) Park Ji-su	1.6

The 2024–25 Women's Basketball Super League was the 45th season of the top division women's basketball league in Turkey since its establishment in 1980. It started in September 2024 with the first round of the regular season and ended in April 2025.

Fenerbahçe are the defending champions.

Fenerbahçe won their nineteenth title after beating ÇBK Mersin in the final.

== Format ==
Each team plays each other twice. The top eight teams qualify for the play offs. The quarterfinals and semifinals are played as a best of three series while the final is played as a best of five series.

== Regular season ==
Pos	Team	Pld	W	L	PF	PA	PD	Pts	Qualification
1	Fenerbahçe	22	18	4	1873	1458	+415	40	Play Offs
2	ÇBK Mersin	22	17	5	1772	1506	+266	39 (Note: ÇBK Mersin 129–128 Galatasaray)	Play Offs
3	Galatasaray	22	17	5	1706	1447	+259	39	Play Offs
4	Emlak Konut	22	15	7	1705	1577	+128	37	Play Offs
5	Beşiktaş	22	11	11	1676	1602	+74	33	Play Offs
6	Botaş	22	10	12	1602	1632	−30	32 (Note: Botaş 2–0 Nesibe Aydın)	Play Offs
7	Nesibe Aydın	22	10	12	1730	1795	−65	32	Play Offs
8	Kayseri Basketbol	22	9	13	1688	1675	+13	31 (Note: Kayseri Basketbol 157–146 Ormanspor)	Play Offs
9	Ormanspor	22	9	13	1632	1657	−25	31	
10	Danilos Pizza	22	7	15	1664	1798	−134	29	
11	Tarsus Belediyesi	22	6	16	1716	1921	−205	28	Relegation to TKBL
12	Bodrum Basketbol	22	3	19	1315	2011	−696	25	Relegation to TKBL

Source: KBSL
Rules for classification: 1) Points; 2) Points difference; 3) Points scored.

== Play offs ==
Quarterfinals
1	Fenerbahçe	98	98	2
8	Kayseri Basketbol	74	56	0
4	Emlak Konut	82	82	63	1
5	Beşiktaş	77	92	68	2
2	ÇBK Mersin	86	91	91	2
7	Nesibe Aydın	95	72	60	1
3	Galatasaray	87	84	2
6	Botaş	64	70	0

Semifinals
1	Fenerbahçe	91	77	2
5	Beşiktaş	42	73	0
2	ÇBK Mersin	83	74	2
3	Galatasaray	78	61	0

Final
1	Fenerbahçe	77	85	79	3
2	ÇBK Mersin	70	54	78	0

Champions of Turkey

Fenerbahçe
Nineteenth title
