= 2023–24 EuroLeague Women qualification round =

EuroLeague Women qualification round
- Season: 2023–24
- Dates: 20–27 September 2023
- Games played: 6
- Teams: 6 (from 6 countries)

The 2023–24 EuroLeague Women qualification round decided the final three teams in the regular season.

== Format ==
Six teams were divided into three play offs, where the winners on aggregate advanced to the regular season.

== Teams ==
Location of teams of the 2023–24 EuroLeague Women Qualification Round.
Orange: Play Off 1; Green: Play Off 2; Deep Pink: Play Off 3.

Teams
(United Kingdom) London Lions
(Hungary) DVTK HUN-Therm
(Latvia) TTT Riga
(Poland) KGHM BC Polkowice
(Romania) ACS Sepsi SIC
(Turkey) Beşiktaş

== Draw ==
The draw took place in Munich, Germany on the 9 August 2023. The bold text means which teams advanced.

Seeded	Unseeded
(Latvia) TTT Riga (Poland) **KGHM BC Polkowice** (Hungary) **DVTK HUN-Therm**	(Romania) **ACS Sepsi SIC** (Turkey) Beşiktaş (United Kingdom) London Lions

== Matches ==
The three winners on aggregate advanced to the regular season.

Team 1	Agg.	Team 2	1st leg	2nd leg
London Lions (United Kingdom)	121–135	(Hungary) **DVTK HUN-Therm**	48–63	73–72
**ACS Sepsi SIC** (Romania)	122–116	(Latvia) TTT Riga	59–54	63–62
Beşiktaş (Turkey)	121–136	(Poland) **KGHM BC Polkowice**	57–58	64–78

All times are local.

20 September
19:00

Boxscore

London Lions (United Kingdom)	48–**63**	(Hungary) **DVTK HUN-Therm**
Scoring by quarter: **15**–14, 11–**17**, 13–**14**, 9–**18**
Pts: Gustafson 13; Rebs: Fagbenle, Gustafson 7 Asts: Landrum, Winterburn 4		Pts: Garbin 16; Rebs: Charles 13; Asts: Aho 6

Copper Box, London
Attendance: 1,300
Referees: Amel Dahra (France), Nikola Perlic (Croatia), Martin Van Hoye (Belgium)

27 September
18:00

Boxscore

DVTK HUN-Therm (Hungary)	72–**73**	(United Kingdom) **London Lions**
Scoring by quarter: 15–**19**, 14–14, **27**–16, 16–**24**
Pts: Garbin 16; Rebs: Aho 8 Asts: Aho 7		Pts: Winterburn 27; Rebs: Gustafson, Landrum 7 Asts: Landrum 5

DVTK Arena, Miskolc
Attendance: 2,000
Referees: Can Mavisu (Turkey), Ivana Ivanovic (Serbia), Veronika Obertova (Slovakia)

DVTK HUN-Therm won 135–121 on aggregate

20 September
19:00

Boxscore

**ACS Sepsi SIC** (Romania)	**59**–54	(Latvia) TTT Riga
Scoring by quarter: **14**–12, 20–**21**, 10–**14**, **15**–7
Pts: Hristova 20; Rebs: Mununga 15; Asts: Gereben 4		Pts: Cohen 15; Rebs: Cohen 12; Asts: Jasa 3

Sepsi Arena, Sfântu Gheorghe
Attendance: 1,500
Referees: Özlem Yalman (Turkey), Sinisa Prpa, (Serbia), Gellert Kapitany, (Hungary)

27 September
19:00

Boxscore

TTT Riga (Latvia)	62–**63**	(Romania) **ACS Sepsi SIC**
Scoring by quarter: **14**–12, 13–**18**, 12–**16**, **23**–17
Pts: Jasa 17; Rebs: Sila 6 Asts: Pulvere 6		Pts: Nystrom 21; Rebs: Mununga 9 Asts: Green 15

Rimi Olympic Centre
Attendance: 700
Referees: Lukasz Jankowski (Poland), Paulina Karolina Gajdosz (Poland), Nemanja Ninkovic (Serbia)

ACS Sepsi SIC won 122–116 on aggregate

20 September
19:00

Boxscore

Beşiktaş (Turkey)	57–**58**	(Poland) **KGHM BC Polkowice**
Scoring by quarter: **24**–11, 11–**18**, 3–**12**, **19**–17
Pts: Nogić 21; Rebs: Bayram 12; Asts: Lazic 8		Pts: Stankovic 15; Rebs: Stankovic 10; Asts: Baric 6

Besiktas Akatlar Arena, Istanbul
Attendance: 250
Referees: Silvia Marziali (Italy), Alin Faur (Romania), Kirile Tvauri (Georgia)

27 September
19:00

Boxscore

**KGHM BC Polkowice** (Poland)	**78**–64	(Turkey) Beşiktaş
Scoring by quarter: **21**–18, **19**–15, **22**–20, **16**–11
Pts: Fraser 17; Rebs: Fraser 10; Asts: Baric, Gajda 7		Pts: Nogić 18; Rebs: Krivacevic 9 Asts: Nogić 8

City Sports Hall, Polkowice
Attendance: 650
Referees: Gintaras Vitkauskas (Lithuania), Valerio Grigioni (Italy), Nikola Bejat (Norway)

KGHM BC Polkowice won 136–121 on aggregate

== See also ==
- 2023–24 EuroLeague Women
- 2023–24 EuroCup Women
- 2023 FIBA Europe SuperCup Women
- 2023–24 EuroCup Women qualification round
