= 2023–24 EuroCup Women =

European women's basketball tournament

EuroCup Women
- Season: 2023–24
- Dates: Qualifying: 20–27 September 2023; Regular season: 11 October – 30 November 2023; Knockout stage: 13 December 2023 – 10 April 2024
- Games played: 212
- Teams: Competition proper: 48; Total: 51 (from 20 countries)

Finals
- Champions: (British Basketball) London Lions (1st title)
- Runners-up: (Turkish Basketball Federation) Beşiktaş
- Finals MVP: (United States) Karlie Samuelson

Statistical leaders
- Points: (United States) Dana Evans (362 points)
- Rebounds: (United States) Myisha Hines-Allen (140 rebounds)
- Assists: (Belgium) Julie Vanloo (101 assists)

Records
- Biggest home win: Flammes Carolo Basket 108–42 Eleftheria Moschatou (11 October 2023)
- Biggest away win: ŽKK Ragusa Dubrovnik 34–113 Umana Reyer Venice (1 November 2023)
- Highest scoring: Tango Bourges Basket 124–92 Antalya Toroslar BC (11 October 2023)
- Highest attendance: 5,200; Spar Girona 77–64 Galatasaray Cagdas Factoring (22 February 2024)
- Lowest attendance: 100 (nine games)

The 2023–24 EuroCup Women was the 22nd edition of FIBA Europe's second-tier international competition for women's basketball clubs under such name. LDLC ASVEL Féminin are the defending champions, but won't defend their title because they're taking part in the 2023–24 EuroLeague Women.

London Lions became the first British team to ever win a European title in basketball after beating Beşiktaş in the final.

== Format ==
After the qualifiers, 48 teams are divided into 12 groups of 4. with the top 2 plus the 8 best third place teams advancing to the knockout stage. In the knockout stage, teams are seeded based on their results in the regular season. Each tie in the knockout stage is played in a home and away format, where the winner on aggregate wins the tie and advances to the next round.

== Rankings ==
The results are based on the results of the past three seasons.

Rank	Association	Average points	Teams
1	Turkey	217.33	6
2	Spain	180.00	4
3	France	152.67	5
4	Hungary	126.67	2
5	Russia	109.33	0
6	Italy	87.33	2
7	Czech Republic	57.33	4
8	Poland	44.00	3
9	Belgium	27.33	3
10	Israel	20.67	2
11	Latvia	18.00	1
12	Greece	17.67	3
13	Romania	14.00	2
14	Switzerland	12.67	1

Rank	Association	Average points	Teams
15	Slovakia	7.33	3
16	Ukraine	6.33	0
17	Serbia	5.33	0
17	(United Kingdom) Great Britain	5.33	2
19	Portugal	4.00	3
19	Luxembourg	4.00	2
21	Germany	2.67	1
21	Lithuania	2.67	1
23	Croatia	2.00	1
23	Belarus	2.00	0
23	Sweden	2.00	0
26	Bulgaria	1.33	0
26	Iceland	1.33	0
28	Norway	0.67	0

== Rule change ==
Starting this year, FIBA Europe has decided to change the format to a pan-European competition and scrapped conferences in the regular season.

== Teams ==
The teams were announced on 13 July 2023. The teams with the S in the qualifying round means they were seeded. Teams with EL lost their EuroLeague Women Qualification round Play Off and dropped down to the EuroCup.

Regular season
(United Kingdom) London Lions ^{EL}	(Latvia) TTT Riga ^{EL}	(Turkey) Beşiktaş ^{EL}	(Belgium) Kangoeroes Basket Mechelen (1st)
(Belgium) Castors Braine (2nd)	(Belgium) Basket Namur Capitale (3rd)	(Croatia) ŽKK Ragusa Dubrovnik (1st)	(Czech Republic) Žabiny Brno (2nd)
(Czech Republic) KP TANY Brno (3rd)	(Czech Republic) Levharti Chomutov (4th)	(France) Lattes Montpellier (3rd)	(France) Tango Bourges Basket (4th)
(France) Roche Vendée Basket (6th)	(France) Union Féminine Angers (7th)	(France) Flammes Carolo Basket (8th)	(Germany) Rutronik Stars Keltern (1st)
(United Kingdom) Caledonia Gladiators (3rd)	(Greece) Olympiacos SFP (1st)	(Greece) Panathinaikos AC (2nd)	(Hungary) KSC Szekszárd (4th)
(Hungary) NKA Universitas Pecs (5th)	(Israel) Elitzur Landco Ramla (1st)	(Israel) Ramat Hasharon (4th)	(Italy) Umana Reyer Venice (3rd)
(Italy) BDS Dinamo Sassari (5th)	(Lithuania) Kibirkštis (1st)	(Luxembourg) BBC Gréngewald Hueschtert (1st)	(Luxembourg) T71 Diddeleng (2nd)
(Poland) InvestInTheWest Enea Gorzow (3rd)	(Poland) MB Zagłębie Sosnowiec (4th)	(Poland) VBW Arka Gdynia (6th)	(Portugal) GDESSA-Barreiro (1st)
(Portugal) SL Benfica (2nd)	(Romania) CMS Constanța (2nd)	(Slovakia) Piešťanské Čajky (1st)	(Slovakia) Slavia Banská Bystrica (2nd)
(Spain) Spar Girona (5th)	(Spain) Lointek Gernika Bizkaia (6th)	(Spain) Cadí La Seu (7th)	(Spain) Movistar Estudiantes (8th)
(Switzerland) BCF Elfic Fribourg (1st)	(Turkey) Galatasaray Cagdas Factoring (3rd)	(Turkey) Emlak Konut SK (5th)	(Turkey) Bursa Uludag Basketbol (10th)
(Turkey) Melikgazi Kayseri (11th)			
Qualification round
(Czech Republic) Ostrava (7th)	(Greece) Eleftheria Moschatou ^{S} (3rd)	(Portugal) Sportiva Azoris Hotels ^{S} (3rd)	(Romania) CS Universitatea Cluj (6th)
(Slovakia) MBK Ružomberok ^{S} (3rd)	(Turkey) Antalya Toroslar BC (12th)		

== Schedule ==
Phase	Round	Dates
Draw		9 August 2023
Qualification round	Gameday 1	21 September 2023
Qualification round	Gameday 2	28 September 2023
Regular season	Gameday 1	12 October 2023
Regular season	Gameday 2	19 October 2023
Regular season	Gameday 3	26 October 2023
Regular season	Gameday 4	1 November 2023
Regular season	Gameday 5	23 November 2023
Regular season	Gameday 6	30 November 2023
Play-off round 1	Gameday 1	14 December 2023
Play-off round 1	Gameday 2	21 December 2023
Round of 16	Gameday 1	11 January 2024
Round of 16	Gameday 2	18 January 2024
Quarter-finals	Gameday 1	22 February 2024
Quarter-finals	Gameday 2	29 February 2024
Semi-finals	Gameday 1	7 March 2024
Semi-finals	Gameday 2	14 March 2024
Finals	Gameday 1	3 April 2024
Finals	Gameday 2	10 April 2024

== Draw ==
The seeding was announced on the 4 August 2023. The draw was on the 9 August 2023. The seeding was decided by the FIBA Club Rankings. The only restriction was that, unlike previous seasons, clubs from the same country could not be drawn into the same group.

Pot 1	Pot 2	Pot 3	Pot 4
(N/A) EL Play-Off Loser 1 (Note: The eventual team in this slot was London Lions.) (N/A) EL Play-Off Loser 2 (Note: The eventual team in this slot was TTT Riga.) (N/A) EL Play-Off Loser 3 (Note: The eventual team in this slot was Beşiktaş.) (Spain) Spar Girona (France) Tango Bourges Basket (Turkey) Galatasaray Cagdas Factoring (Italy) Umana Reyer Venice (Hungary) KSC Szekszárd (France) Lattes Montpellier (France) Flammes Carolo Basket (Israel) Elitzur Landco Ramla (Switzerland) BCF Elfic Fribourg	(Poland) VBW Arka Gdynia (Greece) Olympiacos SFP (Spain) Cadí La Seu (Belgium) Castors Braine (Spain) Lointek Gernika Bizkaia (Poland) InvestInTheWest Enea Gorzow (Belgium) Kangoeroes Basket Mechelen (France) Union Féminine Angers (Hungary) NKA Universitas Pecs (Czech Republic) KP TANY Brno (Belgium) Basket Namur Capitale (Spain) Movistar Estudiantes	(France) Roche Vendée Basket (Czech Republic) Žabiny Brno (Turkey) Melikgazi Kayseri (Italy) BDS Dinamo Sassari (Greece) Panathinaikos AC (Slovakia) Piešťanské Čajky (Portugal) SL Benfica (Lithuania) Kibirkštis (Luxembourg) BBC Gréngewald Hueschtert (Germany) Rutronik Stars Keltern (Turkey) Bursa Uludag Basketbol (Israel) Ramat Hasharon	(Slovakia) Slavia Banská Bystrica (Luxembourg) T71 Diddeleng (Croatia) ŽKK Ragusa Dubrovnik (Turkey) Emlak Konut SK (Czech Republic) Levharti Chomutov (Poland) MB Zagłębie Sosnowiec (Romania) CMS Constanța (United Kingdom) Caledonia Gladiators (Portugal) GDESSA-Barreiro (N/A) Play Off Winner 1 (Note: The eventual team in this slot was MBK Ružomberok.) (N/A) Play Off Winner 2 (Note: The eventual team in this slot was Antalya Toroslar BC.) (N/A) Play Off Winner 3 (Note: The eventual team in this slot was Eleftheria Moschatou.)

== Qualification round ==
The draw for the qualification round was conducted on 9 August 2023. The first legs were held on 20–21 September 2023 while the second legs were held on 27 September 2023.

Team 1	Agg.	Team 2	1st leg	2nd leg
Ostrava (Czech Republic)	94–115	(Slovakia) MBK Ružomberok	45–59	49–56
Antalya Toroslar BC (Turkey)	131–110	(Portugal) Sportiva Azoris Hotels	66–49	65–61
CS Universitatea Cluj (Romania)	107–127	(Greece) Eleftheria Moschatou	47–62	60–65

== Regular season ==
Location of teams of the 2023–24 EuroCup Women regular season.
Brown: Group A; Green: Group B; Deep Pink: Group C; Yellow: Group D;
Red: Group E; Cyan: Group F; Blue: Group G; Purple: Group H;
Pink: Group I; Turquoise: Group J; Spring Green: Group K; Orange: Group L.

48 teams are divided into 12 groups of 4, where the top 2, plus the eight best third placed teams, advance to play-off round 1.

If teams are level on record at the end of the regular season, tiebreakers are applied in the following order:

1. Head-to-head record
2. Head-to-head point differential
3. Head-to-head points scored
4. Point differential for the entire regular season
5. Points scored for the entire regular season
Location of Benelux teams of the 2023–24 EuroCup Women group stage.
Green: Group B; Red: Group E;
Blue: Group G; Purple: Group H;
Pink: Group I.

This season, Caledonia Gladiators, CMS Constanța, MB Zagłębie Sosnowiec, GDESSA-Barreiro, Levharti Chomutov, Eleftheria Moschatou, Emlak Konut SK and Antalya Toroslar BC are making their debuts this year in the regular season.

=== Group A ===
Pos	Team	Pld	W	L	PF	PA	PD	Pts	Qualification	CAD	ZAB	FLA	ELE
1	(Spain) Cadí La Seu	6	5	1	431	410	+21	11	Play-off round 1	—	69–66	48–73	70–61
2	(Czech Republic) Žabiny Brno	6	3	3	453	406	+47	9 (Note: Žabiny Brno 2–0 Flammes Carolo Basket)	Play-off round 1	76–82	—	76–70	93–45
3	(France) Flammes Carolo Basket	6	3	3	487	372	+115	9	Play-off round 1	70–74	70–74	—	108–42
4	(Greece) Eleftheria Moschatou	6	1	5	340	523	−183	7		64–88	70–68	58–96	—

Source: FIBA
Legend: Blue = home team win; Red = away team win.
Rules for classification: 1) Points; 2) Head-to-head record; 3) Head-to-head point differential. 4) General point differential 5) Points scored

=== Group B ===
Pos	Team	Pld	W	L	PF	PA	PD	Pts	Qualification	GIR	GOR	PIE	DID
1	(Spain) Spar Girona	6	6	0	495	380	+115	12	Play-off round 1	—	94–68	73–45	97–71
2	(Poland) InvestInTheWest Enea Gorzow	6	3	3	479	461	+18	9	Play-off round 1	75–77	—	83–81	83–92
3	(Slovakia) Piešťanské Čajky	6	2	4	394	407	−13	8		53–68	64–77	—	81–54
4	(Luxembourg) T71 Diddeleng	6	1	5	390	510	−120	7		68–86	53–93	52–70	—

Source: FIBA
Legend: Blue = home team win; Red = away team win.
Rules for classification: 1) Points; 2) Head-to-head record; 3) Head-to-head point differential. 4) General point differential 5) Points scored

=== Group C ===
Pos	Team	Pld	W	L	PF	PA	PD	Pts	Qualification	GAL	ANG	KIR	CON
1	(Turkey) Galatasaray Cagdas Factoring	6	6	0	500	408	+92	12	Play-off round 1	—	74–62	102–66	83–77
2	(France) Union Féminine Angers	6	4	2	481	356	+125	10	Play-off round 1	70–71	—	90–52	95–61
3	(Lithuania) Kibirkštis	6	2	4	389	518	−129	8		57–87	50–96	—	87–78
4	(Romania) CMS Constanța	6	0	6	405	493	−88	6		76–83	48–68	65–77	—

Source: FIBA
Legend: Blue = home team win; Red = away team win.
Rules for classification: 1) Points; 2) Head-to-head record; 3) Head-to-head point differential. 4) General point differential 5) Points scored

=== Group D ===
Pos	Team	Pld	W	L	PF	PA	PD	Pts	Qualification	LAT	GER	SOS	RAM
1	(France) Lattes Montpellier	4	3	1	303	268	+35	7	Play-off round 1	—	66–67	86–62	Canc.
2	(Spain) Lointek Gernika Bizkaia	4	2	2	283	265	+18	6	Play-off round 1	69–70	—	78–59	Canc.
3	(Poland) MB Zagłębie Sosnowiec	4	1	3	261	314	−53	5	Play-off round 1	70–81	70–69	—	Canc.
4	(Israel) Ramat Hasharon (Note: Ramat Hasharon withdrew due to the Gaza war.)	0	0	0	0	0	0	0	Withdrew	Canc.	Canc.	Canc.	—

Source: FIBA
Legend: Blue = home team win; Red = away team win.
Rules for classification: 1) Points; 2) Head-to-head record; 3) Head-to-head point differential. 4) General point differential 5) Points scored

=== Group E ===
Pos	Team	Pld	W	L	PF	PA	PD	Pts	Qualification	BES	MEC	PAN	SLA
1	(Turkey) Beşiktaş	6	4	2	501	416	+85	10 (Note: Beşiktaş 2–2, +13 PD; Kangoeroes Basket Mechelen 2–2, –5 PD; Panathinaikos AC 2–2, –8 PD)	Play-off round 1	—	93–79	79–80	97–69
2	(Belgium) Kangoeroes Basket Mechelen	6	4	2	517	470	+47	10	Play-off round 1	83–74	—	87–91	88–72
3	(Greece) Panathinaikos AC	6	4	2	446	448	−2	10	Play-off round 1	62–71	80–84	—	66–64
4	(Slovakia) Slavia Banská Bystrica	6	0	6	371	501	−130	6		43–87	60–96	63–67	—

Source: FIBA
Legend: Blue = home team win; Red = away team win.
Rules for classification: 1) Points; 2) Head-to-head record; 3) Head-to-head point differential. 4) General point differential 5) Points scored

=== Group F ===
Pos	Team	Pld	W	L	PF	PA	PD	Pts	Qualification	TTT	KAY	OLY	RUZ
1	(Latvia) TTT Riga	6	6	0	439	362	+77	12	Play-off round 1	—	71–69	59–55	81–56
2	(Turkey) Melikgazi Kayseri	6	3	3	463	430	+33	9 (Note: Melikgazi Kayseri 164–158 Olympiacos SFP)	Play-off round 1	60–80	—	69–85	83–58
3	(Greece) Olympiacos SFP	6	3	3	408	392	+16	9	Play-off round 1	68–77	73–95	—	68–46
4	(Slovakia) MBK Ružomberok	6	0	6	323	449	−126	6		54–71	63–87	46–59	—

Source: FIBA
Legend: Blue = home team win; Red = away team win.
Rules for classification: 1) Points; 2) Head-to-head record; 3) Head-to-head point differential. 4) General point differential 5) Points scored

=== Group G ===
Pos	Team	Pld	W	L	PF	PA	PD	Pts	Qualification	NAM	CAL	BEN	RAM
1	(Belgium) Basket Namur Capitale	4	3	1	240	210	+30	7 (Note: Basket Namur Capitale 107–99 Caledonia Gladiators)	Play-off round 1	—	65–50	73–59	Canc.
2	(United Kingdom) Caledonia Gladiators	4	3	1	236	212	+24	7	Play-off round 1	49–42	—	73–52	Canc.
3	(Portugal) SL Benfica	4	0	4	216	270	−54	4		52–60	53–64	—	Canc.
4	(Israel) Elitzur Landco Ramla (Note: Elitzur Landco Ramla withdrew due to the Gaza war and the inability to play their games.)	0	0	0	0	0	0	0	Withdrew	Canc.	Canc.	Canc.	—

Source: FIBA
Legend: Blue = home team win; Red = away team win.
Rules for classification: 1) Points; 2) Head-to-head record; 3) Head-to-head point differential. 4) General point differential 5) Points scored

=== Group H ===
Pos	Team	Pld	W	L	PF	PA	PD	Pts	Qualification	TAN	BRN	ANT	GRE
1	(France) Tango Bourges Basket	6	6	0	569	370	+199	12	Play-off round 1	—	86–51	124–92	93–59
2	(Czech Republic) KP TANY Brno	6	3	3	459	416	+43	9	Play-off round 1	59–70	—	101–63	95–59
3	(Turkey) Antalya Toroslar BC	6	2	4	465	565	−100	8	Play-off round 1	67–99	79–77	—	74–73
4	(Luxembourg) BBC Gréngewald Hueschtert	6	1	5	383	525	−142	7		42–97	59–76	91–90	—

Source: FIBA
Legend: Blue = home team win; Red = away team win.
Rules for classification: 1) Points; 2) Head-to-head record; 3) Head-to-head point differential. 4) General point differential 5) Points scored

=== Group I ===
Pos	Team	Pld	W	L	PF	PA	PD	Pts	Qualification	LON	CAS	RUT	GDE
1	(United Kingdom) London Lions	6	6	0	521	357	+164	12	Play-off round 1	—	93–53	78–63	79–60
2	(Belgium) Castors Braine	6	4	2	443	446	−3	10	Play-off round 1	76–87	—	97–69	66–60
3	(Germany) Rutronik Stars Keltern	6	2	4	427	475	−48	8		50–93	74–80	—	89–59
4	(Portugal) GDESSA-Barreiro	6	0	6	365	478	−113	6		55–91	63–71	68–82	—

Source: FIBA
Legend: Blue = home team win; Red = away team win.
Rules for classification: 1) Points; 2) Head-to-head record; 3) Head-to-head point differential. 4) General point differential 5) Points scored

=== Group J ===
Pos	Team	Pld	W	L	PF	PA	PD	Pts	Qualification	REY	NKA	BUR	RAG
1	(Italy) Umana Reyer Venice	6	6	0	529	304	+225	12	Play-off round 1	—	73–58	105–58	91–38
2	(Hungary) NKA Universitas Pecs	6	3	3	418	368	+50	9 (Note: NKA Universitas Pecs 153–130 Bursa Uludag Basketbol)	Play-off round 1	52–67	—	78–52	77–66
3	(Turkey) Bursa Uludag Basketbol	6	3	3	401	440	−39	9	Play-off round 1	64–80	78–75	—	60–50
4	(Croatia) ŽKK Ragusa Dubrovnik	6	0	6	272	508	−236	6		34–113	32–78	52–89	—

Source: FIBA
Legend: Blue = home team win; Red = away team win.
Rules for classification: 1) Points; 2) Head-to-head record; 3) Head-to-head point differential. 4) General point differential 5) Points scored

=== Group K ===
Pos	Team	Pld	W	L	PF	PA	PD	Pts	Qualification	MOV	DIN	SZE	LEV
1	(Spain) Movistar Estudiantes	6	6	0	436	381	+55	12	Play-off round 1	—	54–47	83–69	101–80
2	(Italy) BDS Dinamo Sassari	6	3	3	437	413	+24	9 (Note: BDS Dinamo Sassari 157–152 KSC Szekszárd)	Play-off round 1	65–72	—	85–69	88–65
3	(Hungary) KSC Szekszárd	6	3	3	446	450	−4	9	Play-off round 1	54–56	83–72	—	76–65
4	(Czech Republic) Levharti Chomutov	6	0	6	435	510	−75	6		66–70	70–80	89–95	—

Source: FIBA
Legend: Blue = home team win; Red = away team win.
Rules for classification: 1) Points; 2) Head-to-head record; 3) Head-to-head point differential. 4) General point differential 5) Points scored

=== Group L ===
Pos	Team	Pld	W	L	PF	PA	PD	Pts	Qualification	ARK	VEN	FRI	KON
1	(Poland) VBW Arka Gdynia	6	4	2	454	390	+64	10 (Note: VBW Arka Gdynia 163–145 Roche Vendée Basket)	Play-off round 1	—	86–61	77–47	69–53
2	(France) Roche Vendée Basket	6	4	2	445	451	−6	10	Play-off round 1	84–77	—	101–68	72–61
3	(Switzerland) BCF Elfic Fribourg	6	2	4	425	488	−63	8 (Note: BCF Elfic Fribourg 144–142 Emlak Konut SK)	Play-off round 1	93–89	73–79	—	82–71
4	(Turkey) Emlak Konut SK	6	2	4	394	389	+5	8		52–56	86–48	71–62	—

Source: FIBA
Legend: Blue = home team win; Red = away team win.
Rules for classification: 1) Points; 2) Head-to-head record; 3) Head-to-head point differential. 4) General point differential 5) Points scored

=== Ranking of third place teams ===
Due to the withdrawal of both Israeli teams, the games involving the fourth place teams in each group were not counted for the third place ranking.

Pos	Grp	Team	Pld	W	L	PF	PA	PD	Pts	Qualification
1	E	(Greece) Panathinaikos AC	4	2	2	313	321	−8	6	Play-off round 1
2	A	(France) Flammes Carolo Basket	4	1	3	283	272	+11	5	Play-off round 1
3	F	(Greece) Olympiacos SFP	4	1	3	281	300	−19	5	Play-off round 1
4	K	(Hungary) KSC Szekszárd	4	1	3	275	296	−21	5	Play-off round 1
5	D	(Poland) MB Zagłębie Sosnowiec	4	1	3	261	314	−53	5	Play-off round 1
6	L	(Switzerland) BCF Elfic Fribourg	4	1	3	281	346	−65	5	Play-off round 1
7	J	(Turkey) Bursa Uludag Basketbol	4	1	3	252	338	−86	5	Play-off round 1
8	H	(Turkey) Antalya Toroslar BC	4	1	3	301	401	−100	5	Play-off round 1
9	G	(Portugal) SL Benfica	4	0	4	216	270	−54	4	
10	B	(Slovakia) Piešťanské Čajky	4	0	4	243	301	−58	4	
11	I	(Germany) Rutronik Stars Keltern	4	0	4	256	348	−92	4	
12	C	(Lithuania) Kibirkštis	4	0	4	225	375	−150	4	

Source: FIBA.com
Rules for classification: 1) Points; 2) Points difference; 3) Points scored.

=== Seeding ===
Due to the withdrawal of both Israeli teams, the games involving the fourth place teams in each group were not counted.

Seed	Grp	Team	Pld	W	L	PF	PA	PD	Pts
1	H	(France) Tango Bourges Basket	4	4	0	379	269	+110	8
2	I	(United Kingdom) London Lions	4	4	0	351	242	+109	8
3	J	(Italy) Umana Reyer Venice	4	4	0	325	232	+93	8
4	C	(Turkey) Galatasaray Cagdas Factoring	4	4	0	334	255	+79	8
5	B	(Spain) Spar Girona	4	4	0	312	241	+71	8
6	F	(Latvia) TTT Riga	4	4	0	287	252	+35	8
7	K	(Spain) Movistar Estudiantes	4	4	0	265	235	+30	8
8	D	(France) Lattes Montpellier	4	3	1	303	268	+35	7
9	G	(Belgium) Basket Namur Capitale	4	3	1	240	210	+30	7
10	G	(United Kingdom) Caledonia Gladiators	4	3	1	236	212	+24	7
11	L	(France) Roche Vendée Basket	4	3	1	325	304	+21	7
12	A	(Spain) Cadí La Seu	4	3	1	273	285	−12	7
13	C	(France) Union Féminine Angers	4	2	2	318	247	+71	6
14	L	(Poland) VBW Arka Gdynia	4	2	2	329	285	+44	6
15	D	(Spain) Lointek Gernika Bizkaia	4	2	2	283	265	+18	6
16	E	(Turkey) Beşiktaş	4	2	2	317	304	+13	6
17	A	(Czech Republic) Žabiny Brno	4	2	2	292	291	+1	6
18	E	(Belgium) Kangoeroes Basket Mechelen	4	2	2	333	338	−5	6
19	E	(Greece) Panathinaikos AC	4	2	2	313	321	−8	6
20	B	(Poland) InvestInTheWest Enea Gorzow	4	2	2	303	316	−13	6
21	I	(Belgium) Castors Braine	4	2	2	306	323	−17	6
22	A	(France) Flammes Carolo Basket	4	1	3	283	272	+11	5
23	J	(Hungary) NKA Universitas Pecs	4	1	3	263	270	−7	5
24	K	(Italy) BDS Dinamo Sassari	4	1	3	269	278	−9	5
25	H	(Czech Republic) KP TANY Brno	4	1	3	288	298	−10	5
26	F	(Turkey) Melikgazi Kayseri	4	1	3	293	309	−16	5
27	F	(Greece) Olympiacos SFP	4	1	3	281	300	−19	5
28	K	(Hungary) KSC Szekszárd	4	1	3	275	296	−21	5
29	D	(Poland) MB Zagłębie Sosnowiec	4	1	3	261	314	−53	5
30	L	(Switzerland) BCF Elfic Fribourg	4	1	3	281	346	−65	5
31	J	(Turkey) Bursa Uludag Basketbol	4	1	3	252	338	−86	5
32	H	(Turkey) Antalya Toroslar BC	4	1	3	301	401	−100	5

Source: FIBA.com
Rules for classification: 1) Points; 2) Points difference; 3) Points scored.

== Knockout stage ==
=== Bracket ===
Round of 32
24	(Italy) BDS Dinamo Sassari	79	63	142
9	(Belgium) Basket Namur Capitale	73	52	125
25	(Czech Republic) KP TANY Brno	71	59	130
8	(France) Lattes Montpellier	63	89	152
17	(Czech Republic) Žabiny Brno	73	58	131
16	(Turkey) Beşiktaş	63	78	141
32	(Turkey) Antalya Toroslar BC	51	69	120
1	(France) Tango Bourges Basket	108	90	198
21	(Belgium) Castors Braine	62	83	145
12	(Spain) Cadí La Seu	84	87	171
28	(Hungary) KSC Szekszárd	77	51	128
5	(Spain) Spar Girona	89	63	152
20	(Poland) InvestInTheWest Enea Gorzow	74	75	149
13	(France) Union Féminine Angers	67	68	135
29	(Poland) MB Zagłębie Sosnowiec	90	65	155
4	(Turkey) Galatasaray Cagdas Factoring	90	91	181
22	(France) Flammes Carolo Basket	71	73	144
11	(France) Roche Vendée Basket	71	78	149
27	(Greece) Olympiacos SFP	53	65	118
6	(Latvia) TTT Riga	72	70	142
19	(Greece) Panathinaikos AC	56	63	119
14	(Poland) VBW Arka Gdynia	66	67	133
30	(Switzerland) BCF Elfic Fribourg	63	51	114
3	(Italy) Umana Reyer Venice	83	72	155
26	(Turkey) Melikgazi Kayseri	81	76	157
7	(Spain) Movistar Estudiantes	55	63	118
23	(Hungary) NKA Universitas Pecs	75	61	136
10	(United Kingdom) Caledonia Gladiators	51	50	101
18	(Belgium) Kangoeroes Basket Mechelen	75	58	133
15	(Spain) Lointek Gernika Bizkaia	70	69	139
31	(Turkey) Bursa Uludag Basketbol	53	69	116
2	(United Kingdom) London Lions	77	122	199

Round of 16
24	(Italy) BDS Dinamo Sassari	66	69	135
8	(France) Lattes Montpellier	69	79	148
16	(Turkey) Beşiktaş	83	76	159
1	(France) Tango Bourges Basket	74	79	153
12	(Spain) Cadí La Seu	52	39	91
5	(Spain) Spar Girona	68	68	136
20	(Poland) InvestInTheWest Enea Gorzow	73	91	164
4	(Turkey) Galatasaray Cagdas Factoring	87	85	172
11	(France) Roche Vendée Basket	70	61	131
6	(Latvia) TTT Riga	87	69	156
14	(Poland) VBW Arka Gdynia	68	59	127
3	(Italy) Umana Reyer Venice	77	80	157
26	(Turkey) Melikgazi Kayseri	76	70	146
23	(Hungary) NKA Universitas Pecs	65	72	137
15	(Spain) Lointek Gernika Bizkaia	69	59	128
2	(United Kingdom) London Lions	76	87	163

Quarter-finals
8	(France) Lattes Montpellier	59	72	131
16	(Turkey) Beşiktaş	73	75	148
5	(Spain) Spar Girona	77	83	160
4	(Turkey) Galatasaray Cagdas Factoring	64	81	145
6	(Latvia) TTT Riga	70	78	148
3	(Italy) Umana Reyer Venice	83	88	171
26	(Turkey) Melikgazi Kayseri	79	70	149
2	(United Kingdom) London Lions	87	82	169

Semi-finals
16	(Turkey) Beşiktaş	81	68	149
5	(Spain) Spar Girona	60	66	126
3	(Italy) Umana Reyer Venice	68	59	127
2	(United Kingdom) London Lions	69	71	140

Final
16	(Turkey) Beşiktaş	75	70	145
2	(United Kingdom) London Lions	68	81	149

=== Play-off round 1 ===
Team 1	Agg.	Team 2	1st leg	2nd leg
Antalya Toroslar BC (Turkey)	120–198	(France) Tango Bourges Basket	51–108	69–90
Bursa Uludag Basketbol (Turkey)	116–199	(United Kingdom) London Lions	53–77	63–122 (Note: This game was marred with controversy as due to visa issues, Bursa Uludag Basketbol fielded only five players for the game, including injured player, Eda Şahin.)
BCF Elfic Fribourg (Switzerland)	114–155	(Italy) Umana Reyer Venice	63–83	51–72
MB Zagłębie Sosnowiec (Poland)	155–181	(Turkey) Galatasaray Cagdas Factoring	90–90	65–91
KSC Szekszárd (Hungary)	128–152	(Spain) Spar Girona	77–89	51–63
Olympiacos SFP (Greece)	118–142	(Latvia) TTT Riga	53–72	65–70
Melikgazi Kayseri (Turkey)	157–118	(Spain) Movistar Estudiantes	81–55	76–63
KP TANY Brno (Czech Republic)	130–152	(France) Lattes Montpellier	71–63	59–89
BDS Dinamo Sassari (Italy)	142–125	(Belgium) Basket Namur Capitale	79–73	63–52
NKA Universitas Pecs (Hungary)	136–101	(United Kingdom) Caledonia Gladiators	75–51	61–50
Flammes Carolo Basket (France)	144–149	(France) Roche Vendée Basket	71–71	73–78
Castors Braine (Belgium)	145–171	(Spain) Cadí La Seu	62–84	83–87
InvestInTheWest Enea Gorzow (Poland)	149–135	(France) Union Féminine Angers	74–67	75–68
Panathinaikos AC (Greece)	119–133	(Poland) VBW Arka Gdynia	56–66	63–67
Kangoeroes Basket Mechelen (Belgium)	133–139	(Spain) Lointek Gernika Bizkaia	75–70	58–69
Žabiny Brno (Czech Republic)	131–141	(Turkey) Beşiktaş	73–63	58–78

=== Round of 16 ===
Team 1	Agg.	Team 2	1st leg	2nd leg
Beşiktaş (Turkey)	159–153	(France) Tango Bourges Basket	83–74	76–79
Lointek Gernika Bizkaia (Spain)	128–163	(United Kingdom) London Lions	69–76	59–87
VBW Arka Gdynia (Poland)	127–157	(Italy) Umana Reyer Venice	68–77	59–80
InvestInTheWest Enea Gorzow (Poland)	164–172	(Turkey) Galatasaray Cagdas Factoring	73–87	91–85
Cadí La Seu (Spain)	91–136	(Spain) Spar Girona	52–68	39–68
Roche Vendée Basket (France)	131–156	(Latvia) TTT Riga	70–87	61–69
Melikgazi Kayseri (Turkey)	146–137 (Note: Order of legs reversed after original draw.)	(Hungary) NKA Universitas Pecs	76–65	70–72
BDS Dinamo Sassari (Italy)	135–148	(France) Lattes Montpellier	66–69	69–79

=== Quarterfinals ===
Team 1	Agg.	Team 2	1st leg	2nd leg
Beşiktaş (Turkey)	148–131 (Note: Order of legs reversed after original draw.)	(France) Lattes Montpellier	73–59	75–72
Melikgazi Kayseri (Turkey)	149–169	(United Kingdom) London Lions	79–87	70–82
TTT Riga (Latvia)	148–171	(Italy) Umana Reyer Venice	70–83	78–88
Spar Girona (Spain)	160–145	(Turkey) Galatasaray Cagdas Factoring	77–64	83–81

=== Matches ===
22 February 2024
20:00

Report

Beşiktaş (Turkey)	73–59	(France) Lattes Montpellier
Scoring by quarter: 21–11, 24–15, 16–16, 12–17
Pts: Nogić 17; Rebs: Li Yue 13; Asts: Nogić 7		Pts: Rabot 21; Rebs: Jenkins 11; Asts: Alston 6

Besiktas Akatlar Arena, Istanbul
Attendance: 1,500
Referees: Silvia Marziali (ITA), Alakbar Hasanov (AZE), Mladen Lucic (MNE)

29 February 2024
20:00

Report

Lattes Montpellier (France)	72–75	(Turkey) Beşiktaş
Scoring by quarter: 18–26, 19–17, 11–16, 24–16
Pts: Naigre 13; Rebs: Rabot 8 Asts: Bernies 4		Pts: Evans 17; Rebs: Lazic 9 Asts: Nogić 5

Palais des Sports de Lattes, Lattes
Attendance: 810
Referees: Alin Faur (ROU), Elvis Binders–Coders (LAT), Andrea Bongiorni (ITA)

Beşiktaş won 148–131 on aggregate

22 February 2024
18:30

Report

Melikgazi Kayseri (Turkey)	79–87	(United Kingdom) London Lions
Scoring by quarter: 26–30, 14–16, 19–22, 20–19
Pts: Hamby 23; Rebs: Hamby 13; Asts: Gunay 7		Pts: Gustafson 26; Rebs: Peddy 10; Asts: Fagbenle 10

Kadir Has Kongre ve Spor Merkezi, Kayseri
Attendance: 1,500
Referees: Yasmina Alcaraz (ESP), Jelena Tomic (CRO), Kirile Tvauri (GEO)

28 February 2024
19:00

Report

London Lions (United Kingdom)	82–70	(Turkey) Melikgazi Kayseri
Scoring by quarter: 17–10, 21–16, 29–25, 15–19
Pts: Gustafson 24; Rebs: Samuelson 9 Asts: Winterburn 6		Pts: Hamby 18; Rebs: Cuic Hamby 9 Asts: Ellenberg-Wiley 5

Copper Box, London
Attendance: 1,413
Referees: Amel Dahra (FRA), Paulina Karolina Gajdosz (POL), Tijmen Last (NED)

London Lions won 169–149 on aggregate

22 February 2024
19:30

Report

TTT Riga (Latvia)	70–83	(Italy) Umana Reyer Venice
Scoring by quarter: 15–21, 18–31, 20–23, 17–8
Pts: Pulvere 22; Rebs: Lambert 7 Asts: Lambert 7		Pts: Berkani, Shepard 16; Rebs: Shepard 14; Asts: Makurat 5

Rimi Olympic Centre, Riga
Attendance: 450
Referees: Vladimir Jevtovic (SRB), Peter Zenis (SVK), Alexandre Maret (FRA)

29 February 2024
19:30

Report

Umana Reyer Venice (Italy)	88–78	(Latvia) TTT Riga
Scoring by quarter: 26–21, 27–20, 15–23, 20–14
Pts: Fassina 19; Rebs: Shepard 17; Asts: Makurat 6		Pts: Lambert 19; Rebs: Otto 8 Asts: Lambert 5

Palasport Taliercio, Venice
Attendance: 1,514
Referees: Joaquin Garcia Gonzalez (ESP), Alexandra-Ioana Stan (ROU), Hrvoje Cavar (BIH)

Umana Reyer Venice won 171–148 on aggregate

22 February 2024
19:00

Report

Spar Girona (Spain)	77–64	(Turkey) Galatasaray Cagdas Factoring
Scoring by quarter: 21–22, 19–12, 20–15, 17–15
Pts: Ygueravide 15; Rebs: Lopez, Magarity 9 Asts: Lopez, Ygueravide 5		Pts: Smith 16; Rebs: Smith 12; Asts: Vanloo 6

Pavelló Fontajau, Girona
Attendance: 5,200
Referees: Cecília Tóth (HUN), Nikola Bejat (NOR), Ewa Matuszewska (POL)

29 February 2024
20:00

Report

Galatasaray Cagdas Factoring (Turkey)	81–83	(Spain) Spar Girona
Scoring by quarter: 23–20, 15–19, 17–19, 26–25
Pts: McCowan 20; Rebs: Smith 11; Asts: Vanloo 5		Pts: Ygueravide 21; Rebs: Ygueravide 8 Asts: Mendy 7

Ahmet Cömert Sport Hall, Istanbul
Attendance: 800
Referees: Vladimir Evtovic (SRB), Nikolaos Tziopanos (GRE), Christian Theis (GER)

Spar Girona won 160–145 on aggregate

=== Semifinals ===
London Lions became the first British club to reach a final of a club basketball competition.

Team 1	Agg.	Team 2	1st leg	2nd leg
Beşiktaş (Turkey)	149–126 (Note: Order of legs reversed after original draw.)	(Spain) Spar Girona	81–60	68–66
Umana Reyer Venice (Italy)	127–140	(United Kingdom) London Lions	68–69	59–71

=== Matches ===
7 March 2024
20:00

Report

Beşiktaş (Turkey)	81–60	(Spain) Spar Girona
Scoring by quarter: 27–21, 14–14, 15–18, 25–7
Pts: Evans 28; Rebs: Li Yue 10; Asts: Evans 6		Pts: Magarity 19; Rebs: Canella 9 Asts: Canella 5

Besiktas Akatlar Arena, Istanbul
Attendance: 2,550
Referees: Igor Mitrovski (NMK), Lukasz Jankowski (POL), Nemanja Ninkovic (SRB)

14 March 2024
19:00

Report

Spar Girona (Spain)	66–68	(Turkey) Beşiktaş
Scoring by quarter: 13–21, 10–17, 22–12, 21–18
Pts: Canella 13; Rebs: Magarity 9 Asts: Ygueravide 5		Pts: Evans, Nogić 14; Rebs: Li Yue 15; Asts: Evans, Lazić 3

Pavelló Fontajau, Girona
Attendance: 1,500
Referees: Cecília Tóth (HUN), Ivor Matejek (CZE), Josip Jercevic (CRO)

Beşiktaş won 149–126 on aggregate

6 March 2024
19:30

Report

Umana Reyer Venice (Italy)	68–69	(United Kingdom) London Lions
Scoring by quarter: 21–20, 3–20, 19–10, 25–19
Pts: Villa 14; Rebs: Shepard 7 Asts: Villa 4		Pts: Fagbenle 24; Rebs: Gustafson 12; Asts: Winterburn 8

Palasport Taliercio, Venice
Attendance: 2,500
Referees: Ciprian Stoica (ROU), Jan Baloun (CZE), Elvis Binders-Coders (LAT)

12 March 2024
19:00

Report

London Lions (United Kingdom)	71–59	(Italy) Umana Reyer Venice
Scoring by quarter: 19–13, 12–20, 24–12, 16–14
Pts: Gustafson 19; Rebs: Fagbenle 9 Asts: Winterburn 5		Pts: Shepard 21; Rebs: Shepard 13; Asts: Berkani 5

Copper Box, London
Attendance: 1,630
Referees: Viola Györgyi (ROU), Stylianos Simeonidis (GRE), Franko Gracin (CRO)

London Lions won 140–127 on aggregate

=== Final ===
Team 1	Agg.	Team 2	1st leg	2nd leg
Beşiktaş (Turkey)	145–149	(United Kingdom) London Lions	75–68	70–81

=== Matches ===
3 April 2024
20:30

Report

Beşiktaş (Turkey)	75–68	(United Kingdom) London Lions
Scoring by quarter: 20–15, 20–12, 11–16, 24–25
Pts: Evans 20; Rebs: Bayram 11; Asts: Nogić 7		Pts: Winterburn 23; Rebs: Fagbenle 9 Asts: Winterburn 5

Besiktas Akatlar Arena, Istanbul
Attendance: 1,854
Referees: Beniamino Manuel Attard (ITA), Amal Dahra (FRA), Sinisa Prpa (SRB)

10 April 2024
19:00

Report

London Lions (United Kingdom)	81–70	(Turkey) Beşiktaş
Scoring by quarter: 23–17, 22–18, 15–20, 21–15
Pts: Samuelson 19; Rebs: Winterburn 9 Asts: Peddy 5		Pts: Evans 17; Rebs: Bayram 12; Asts: Evans 8

Copper Box, London
Attendance: 4,630
Referees: Geert Jacobs (BEL), Yasmina Alcaraz (ESP), Ventsislav Velikov (BUL)

London Lions won 149–145 on aggregate

2023–24 EuroCup Women Champions

London Lions
First title

== Awards ==
=== Finals MVP ===
Player	Team	Ref.
(United States) Karlie Samuelson	(United Kingdom) London Lions	

=== MVP of the Month ===
Month	Player	Team	Ref.
October	(United States) Myisha Hines-Allen	(Turkey) Galatasaray Cagdas Factoring	
November	(United States) Jessica Shepard	(Italy) Umana Reyer Venice	
December	(United States) NaLyssa Smith	(Turkey) Galatasaray Cagdas Factoring	
January	(Lithuania) Gintarė Petronytė	(Turkey) Melikgazi Kayseri	
February	(United States) Karlie Samuelson	(United Kingdom) London Lions	
March	(China) Li Yueru	(Turkey) Beşiktaş	

=== MVP of the Round ===
==== Regular season ====
Round	PG	SG	SF	PF	C
1	(United States) Dana Evans ( (Turkey) Beşiktaş)	(Germany) Alexandra Wilke ( (Germany) Rutronik Stars Keltern)	(United States) Myisha Hines-Allen ( (Turkey) Galatasaray Cagdas Factoring)	(United States) Kelsey Bone ( (Turkey) Antalya Toroslar BC)	(Australia) Lauren Scherf ( (France) Flammes Carolo Basket)
2	(United States) Aaryn Ellenberg-Wiley ( (Turkey) Melikgazi Kayseri)	(United States) Karlie Samuelson ( (United Kingdom) London Lions)	(Sweden) Regan Magarity ( (Spain) Spar Girona)	(United States) Trinity Baptiste ( (Turkey) Bursa Uludag Basketbol)	(United States) Kelsey Bone ( (Turkey) Antalya Toroslar BC)
3	(United States) Aisha Sheppard ( (Turkey) Antalya Toroslar BC)	(United Kingdom) Holly Winterburn ( (United Kingdom) London Lions)	(Canada) Kayla Alexander ( (France) Tango Bourges Basket)	(United States) Kelsey Bone ( (Turkey) Antalya Toroslar BC)	(United States) Myisha Hines-Allen ( (Turkey) Galatasaray Cagdas Factoring)
4	(France) Marine Dursus ( (France) Union Féminine Angers)	(Lithuania) Kamilė Nacickaitė ( (France) Tango Bourges Basket)	(United States) Jessica Shepard ( (Italy) Umana Reyer Venice)	(United States) Jacinta Monroe ( (Hungary) KSC Szekszárd)	(United States) Rennia Davis ( (Poland) VBW Arka Gdynia)
5	(United States) Samantha Logic ( (Luxembourg) BBC Gréngewald Hueschtert)	(United Kingdom) Holly Winterburn ( (United Kingdom) London Lions)	(United States) Amanda Cahill ( (Luxembourg) BBC Gréngewald Hueschtert)	(Canada) Kayla Alexander ( (France) Tango Bourges Basket)	(Lithuania) Gintarė Petronytė ( (Turkey) Melikgazi Kayseri)
6	(France) Pauline Astier ( (France) Tango Bourges Basket)	(Czech Republic) Karolina Šotolová ( (Czech Republic) Žabiny Brno)	(United States) Mia Loyd ( (Luxembourg) T71 Diddeleng)	(United States) Jessica Shepard ( (Italy) Umana Reyer Venice)	(United States) Kelsey Bone ( (Turkey) Antalya Toroslar BC)

==== Playoffs ====
Play-off Round 1

Round	PG	SG	SF	PF	C
First leg	(Latvia) Ieva Pulvere ( (Latvia) TTT Riga)	(United States) Jessica January ( (Poland) MB Zagłębie Sosnowiec)	(United States) Joyner Holmes ( (Turkey) Melikgazi Kayseri)	(United States) NaLyssa Smith ( (Turkey) Galatasaray Cagdas Factoring)	(Australia) Lauren Scherf ( (France) Flammes Carolo Basket)
Second leg	(Belarus) Katsiaryna Snytsina ( (United Kingdom) London Lions)	(United States) Jazmine Jones ( (Greece) Panathinaikos AC)	(Puerto Rico) Mya Hollingshed ( (Italy) BDS Dinamo Sassari)	(United States) Myisha Hines-Allen ( (Turkey) Galatasaray Cagdas Factoring)	(United States) Channon Fluker ( (Turkey) Bursa Uludag Basketbol)

Round of 16

Round	PG	SG	SF	PF	C
First leg	(United States) Kyra Lambert ( (Latvia) TTT Riga)	(Serbia) Jovana Nogić ( (Turkey) Beşiktaş)	(United States) NaLyssa Smith ( (Turkey) Galatasaray Cagdas Factoring)	(United States) Myisha Hines-Allen ( (Turkey) Galatasaray Cagdas Factoring)	(Lithuania) Gintarė Petronytė ( (Turkey) Melikgazi Kayseri)
Second leg	(Belgium) Julie Vanloo ( (Turkey) Galatasaray Cagdas Factoring)	(United States) Dana Evans ( (Turkey) Beşiktaş)	(United States) Alisia Jenkins ( (France) Lattes Montpellier)	(Poland) Weronika Telenga ( (Poland) InvestInTheWest Enea Gorzow)	(Lithuania) Gintarė Petronytė ( (Turkey) Melikgazi Kayseri)

Quarterfinals

Round	PG	SG	SF	PF	C
First leg	(Spain) Ygueravide ( (Spain) Spar Girona)	(United States) Karlie Samuelson ( (United Kingdom) London Lions)	(France) Garance Rabot ( (France) Lattes Montpellier)	(United States) Megan Gustafson ( (United Kingdom) London Lions)	(United States) Dearica Hamby ( (Turkey) Melikgazi Kayseri)
Second leg	(United Kingdom) Karlie Samuelson ( (United Kingdom) London Lions)	(France) Magali Mendy ( (Spain) Spar Girona)	(United States) Megan Gustafson ( (United Kingdom) London Lions)	(United States) Jessica Shepard ( (Italy) Umana Reyer Venice)	(China) Li Yueru ( (Turkey) Beşiktaş)

Semifinals

Round	PG	SG	SF	PF	C
First leg	(Italy) Matilde Villa ( (Italy) Umana Reyer Venice)	(United States) Dana Evans ( (Turkey) Beşiktaş)	(United Kingdom) Temi Fagbenle ( (United Kingdom) London Lions)	(Sweden) Regan Magarity ( (Spain) Spar Girona)	(China) Li Yueru ( (Turkey) Beşiktaş)
Second leg	(Spain) Marta Canella ( (Spain) Spar Girona)	(United Kingdom) Holly Winterburn ( (United Kingdom) London Lions)	(United Kingdom) Temi Fagbenle ( (United Kingdom) London Lions)	(United States) Jessica Shepard ( (Italy) Umana Reyer Venice)	(China) Li Yueru ( (Turkey) Beşiktaş)

== Marketing ==
On 3 August 2023, FIBA Europe unveiled a new logo for the tournament. Their reasons behind the logo refresh were:

The approach to the logo refresh was to elevate the initial logo concept to a more dynamic 3D look with greater depth and character. While keeping its core elements, it adds a new and vibrant dimension to the logo, offering a fresh modern feel together with the new typography.

== See also ==
- 2023–24 EuroLeague Women
- 2023–24 EuroLeague Women qualification round
- 2023 FIBA Europe SuperCup Women
- 2023–24 EuroCup Basketball
