= Valérie Garnier =

French basketball coach

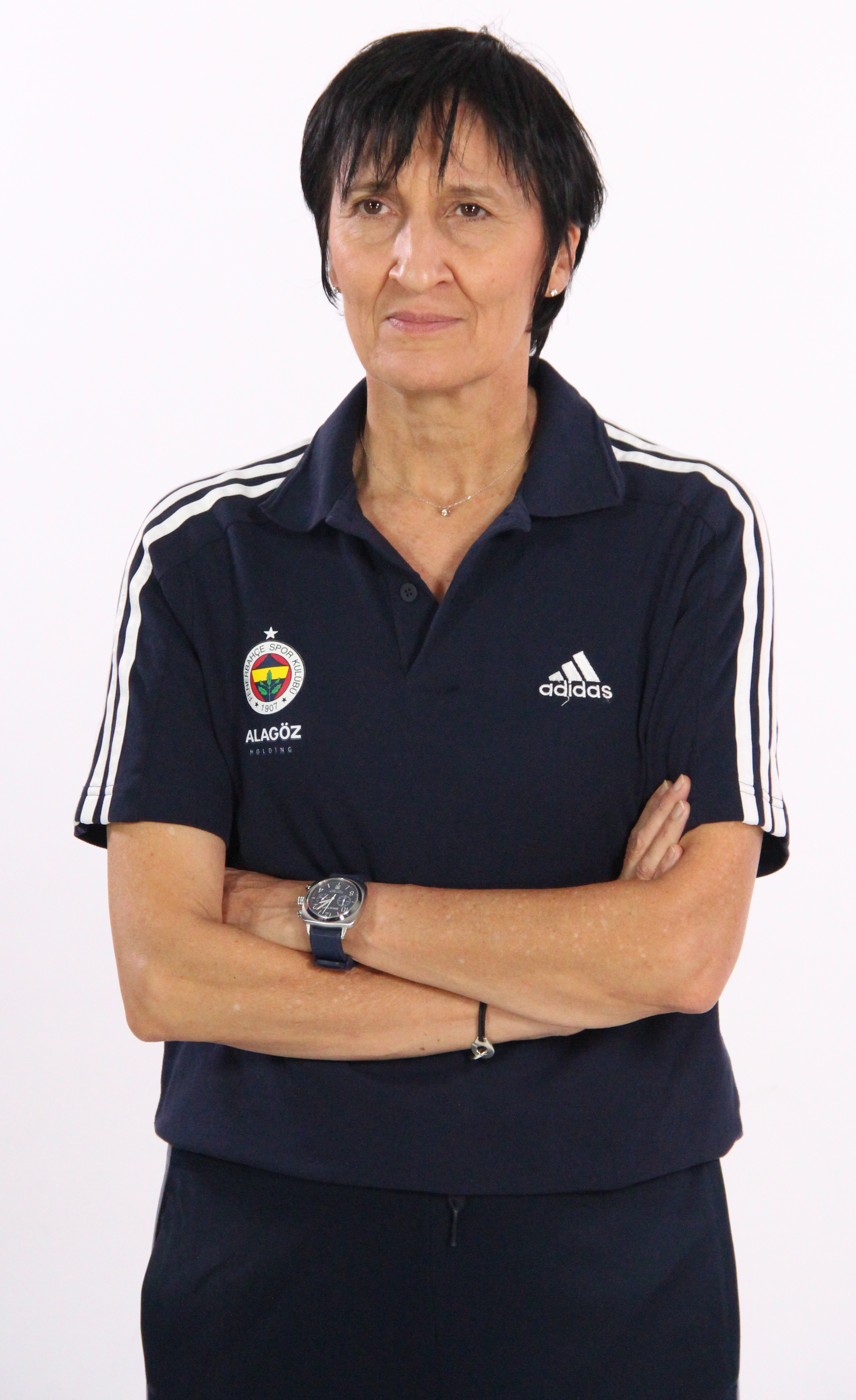
- Garnier in 2023

Personal information
- Born: 9 January 1965 (age 61) Cholet, France

Career information
- Playing career: 1983–1994
- Position: Point guard / shooting guard
- Coaching career: 2002–present

Career history

Playing
- 1983–1991: BAC Mirande
- 1991–1993: ASPTT Aix-en-Provence
- 1993–1994: RC Strasbourg

Coaching
- 2000–2005: Lattes-Montpellier
- 2004–2006: France (assistant)
- 2005–2008: Le Temple-sur-Lot
- 2008–2011: Toulouse Métropole Basket
- 2011–2017: Tango Bourges Basket
- 2012–2013: France (assistant)
- 2013–2021: France
- 2018–2019: Fenerbahçe SK
- 2022–2023: Tours Métropole Basket
- 2023–2025: Fenerbahçe SK

Career highlights
- As player: French NF1A League champion (1988, 1989, 1990); As head coach: EuroLeague Women winner (2024); 2× FIBA Europe SuperCup Women champion (2023, 2024); EuroCup Women winner (2016); 3× French LFB League champion (2012, 2013, 2015); 2× French Cup winner (2014, 2017); 3× Turkish Super League champion (2018, 2019, 2024); 2× Turkish Cup winner (2019, 2024); Turkish Presidential Cup champion (2024); Knight of the Legion of Honor (2013); Officer of the Legion of Honor (2021)
- FIBA Hall of Fame
Medals
Women's basketball
Head coach for France
Bronze medal – third place	2020 Tokyo	Team
EuroBasket
Silver medal – second place	2013 France
Silver medal – second place	2015 Hungary/Romania
Silver medal – second place	2017 Czech Republic
Silver medal – second place	2019 Serbia/Latvia
Silver medal – second place	2021 Spain/France

Valérie Garnier (born 9 January 1965) is a French basketball coach for the French national team, which participated at the 2014 FIBA World Championship.

She was a French basketball player. She has coached French basketball teams since 1995 and France's women's national basketball team since 2013.

== Honours ==
=== As player ===
BAC Mirande (1983-1991)

- Nationale Féminine 1A: 1988, 1989, 1990

=== As coach ===
Tango Bourges Basket (2011–2017)

- EuroCup Women: 2015–16
- Ligue Féminine: 2012, 2013, 2015
- Coupe de France: 2014, 2017
- Match des Champions: 2014, 2015

Fenerbahçe (2018–2019)

- Turkish Basketball Super League: 2018, 2019
- Turkish Cup: 2019

Fenerbahçe (2023–2025)

- FIBA Europe SuperCup Women: 2023 2024
- EuroLeague Women: 2023–24
- Triple Crown: 2023–24
- Turkish Basketball Super League: 2023–24
- Turkish Cup: 2023–24
