= 2023 FIBA Europe SuperCup Women =

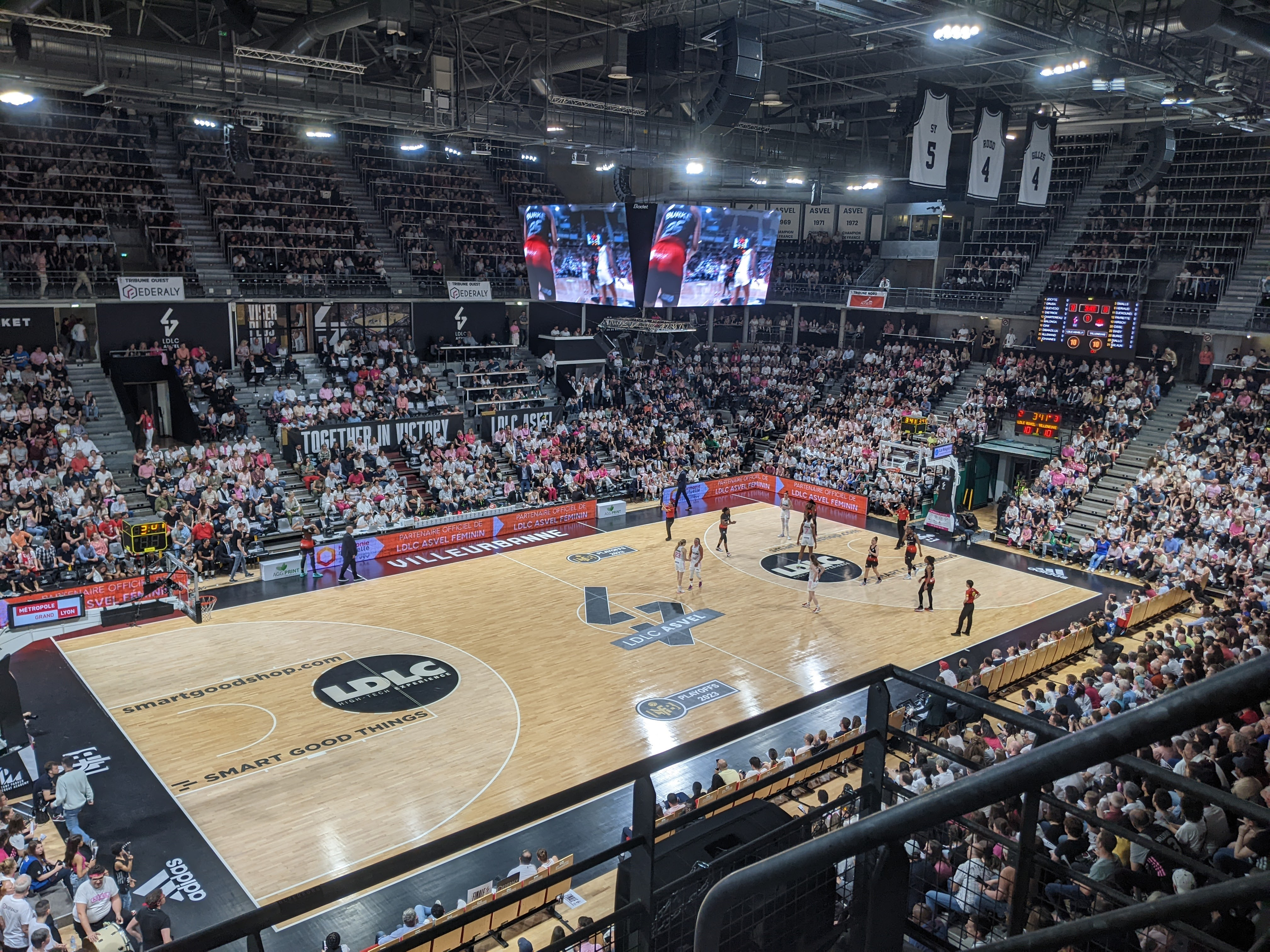
- Astroballe in Lyon, France hosted the SuperCup

Tournament details
- Arena: Lyon, France
- Dates: 28 September 2023

Final positions
- Champions: (Turkey) Fenerbahçe Alagoz Holding (1st title)
- Runners-up: (France) LDLC ASVEL Féminin

Awards and statistics
- MVP: (United States) Napheesa Collier
- Top scorer(s): (United States) Napheesa Collier (20 pts)
- Attendance: 1,006

The 2023 FIBA Europe SuperCup Women was the 12th edition of the FIBA Europe SuperCup Women. It was held on 28 September 2023, in Lyon, France between LDLC ASVEL Féminin and Fenerbahçe Alagoz Holding. Fenerbahçe became the first Turkish club to win the title by crushing France's ASVEL Féminin 109–52 on their own homeground. This win has set the record for the largest margin victory in the SuperCup's history.

== Venue ==
The venue was the Astroballe in Lyon.

2023 FIBA Europe SuperCup Women is located in France	Lyon
2023 FIBA Europe SuperCup Women is located in France	Astroballe
2023 FIBA Europe SuperCup Women is located in France	Capacity: 5,556

== Teams ==
Team	Qualification	Previous participation (bold indicates winners)
(Turkey) Fenerbahçe Alagoz Holding	Winners of the 2022–23 EuroLeague Women	None
(France) LDLC ASVEL Féminin	Winners of the 2022–23 EuroCup Women	None

== Final ==
28 September 2023
20:00 (UTC+2)

Boxscore

LDLC ASVEL Féminin (France)	52–**109**	(Turkey) **Fenerbahçe Alagöz Holding**
Scoring by quarter: 16–**26**, 12–**25**, 10–**33**, 14–**25**
Pts: Chartereau, Ciak 14; Rebs: Camara, Ciak 4 Asts: Fauthoux, Risacher 3		Pts: Collier 20; Rebs: Meesseman 13; Asts: Collier, Uzun 5

Astroballe, Lyon
Attendance: 1,006
Referees: Cecília Montgomery-Tóth (HUN), Esperanza Mendoza Holgado (ESP), Suzana Vujičić (MNE)

Starters:			Pts	Reb	Ast
PG	4	(France) Marine Fauthoux	4	2	3
SG	20	(France) Justine Mouyokolo	4	3	1
SF	9	(Spain) Laura Quevedo	9	1	2
PF	12	(France) Alexia Chartereau	14	2	1
C	16	(France) Héléna Ciak	14	4	1
Reserves:					
C	7	(France) Sandrine Gruda	DNP		
F	17	(France) Noémie Durand	2	1	0
F	18	(France) Ainhoa Risacher	3	3	3
SF	19	(France) Aïcha Camara	0	4	1
SG	21	(France) Maelys Faurat	2	0	1
Head coach:
(French Federation of Basketball) David Gauthier

**ASVEL**	**Fenerbahçe**

ASVEL	Statistics	Fenerbahçe
17/39 (43.6%)	2-pt field goals	34/52 (65.4%)
5/20 (25%)	3-pt field goals	8/20 (40%)
3/4 (75%)	Free throws	17/20 (85%)
8	Offensive rebounds	12
16	Defensive rebounds	29
26	Total rebounds	41
13	Assists	31
27	Turnovers	9
6	Steals	20
1	Blocks	5
14	Fouls	12

2023 FIBA Europe SuperCup Women winner

**Fenerbahçe Alagöz Holding**
**1st title**

Starters:			Pts	Reb	Ast
PG	10	(Turkey) Alperi Onar	12	0	2
SG	12	(United States) Yvonne Anderson	10	3	2
SF	21	(United States) Kayla McBride	9	3	3
PF	24	(United States) Napheesa Collier	20	7	5
C	11	(Belgium) Emma Meesseman	10	13	4
Reserves:					
SG	2	(Turkey) Sevgi Uzun	3	0	5
PG	4	(Turkey) Duygu Özen	0	0	0
C	13	(Serbia) Nikolina Milić	13	2	2
PF	15	(Turkey) Tilbe Şenyürek	11	4	1
PG	23	(Turkey) Merve Aydın	0	3	4
G	25	(Serbia) Marija Leković	3	0	2
SF	33	(Latvia) Kitija Laksa	18	4	1
Head coach:
(French Federation of Basketball) Valérie Garnier

== See also ==
- 2023–24 EuroLeague Women
- 2023–24 EuroCup Women
- 2023–24 EuroLeague Women qualification round
- 2023–24 EuroCup Women qualification round
