= 2023–24 EuroLeague Women =

EuroLeague Women
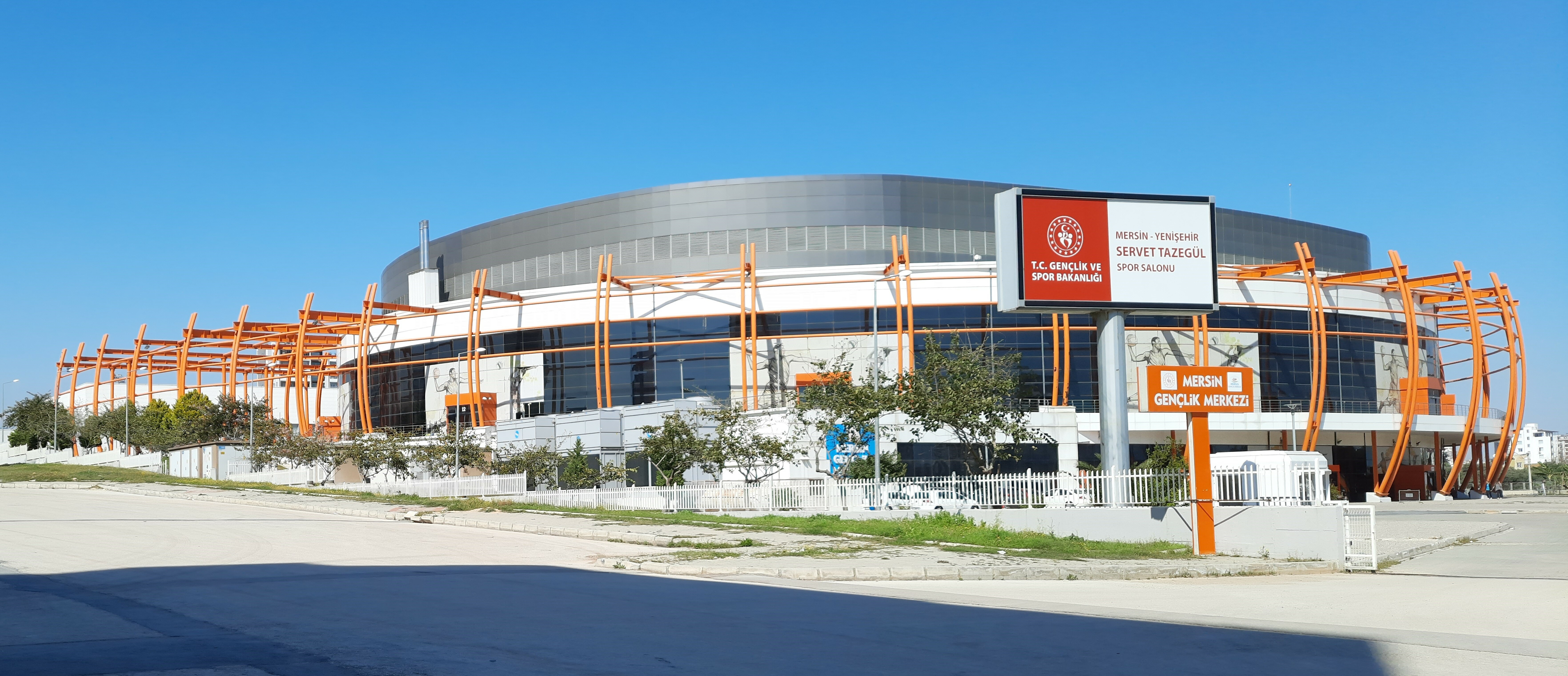
- Servet Tazegul Spor Salonu in Mersin hosted the final four.
- Season: 2023–24
- Dates: Qualifying: 20–27 September 2023; Regular season: 4 October 2023 – 30 January 2024; Quarterfinals: 21 February–6 March 2024; Final Four: 12–14 April 2024
- Games played: 133
- Teams: Competition proper: 16; Total: 19 (from 10 countries)

Regular season
- Season MVP: (Belgium) Emma Meesseman (Fenerbahçe)

Finals
- Champions: (Turkish Basketball Federation) Fenerbahçe Alagoz Holding (2nd title)
- Runners-up: (French Federation of Basketball) Villeneuve d'Ascq LM
- Final Four MVP: (United States) Kayla McBride

Statistical leaders
- Points: (United States) Marina Mabrey (315 points)
- Rebounds: (Australia) Ezi Magbegor (119 rebounds)
- Assists: (United States) Morgan Green (107 assists)

Records
- Biggest home win: Fenerbahçe 106–57 LDLC ASVEL Féminin (11 October 2023)
- Biggest away win: AZS UMCS Lublin 50–85 Fenerbahçe (31 October 2023)
- Highest scoring: Fenerbahçe 98–91 Perfumerías Avenida (21 February 2024)
- Highest attendance: 7,920; Çukurova Basketbol Mersin 86–63 Casademont Zaragoza (6 March 2024)
- Lowest attendance: 250; Beşiktaş 57–58 KGHM BC Polkowice (20 September 2023)

The 2023–24 EuroLeague Women was the 66th edition of the European women's club basketball championship organized by FIBA, and the 27th edition since being rebranded as the EuroLeague Women. Fenerbahçe Alagoz Holding are the defending champions.

The Turkish side successfully defended their crown by defeating first-time finalists Villeneuve d'Ascq LM to become back-to-back champions in the competition.

This season had record-breaking success on digital platforms.

== Format ==
After the qualifiers, sixteen teams play in the regular season. They were divided into 2 groups of 8, with the top 4 advancing to the quarter-finals. In the quarter-finals, the eight teams left played in four best-of-three play-offs, and whoever wins the series make the final four.

== Rankings ==
The results were based on the results of the past three seasons.

- Associations 1–4 can have three teams qualify.
- Associations 5–8 each have two teams qualify.
- Associations 9–10 each have one team qualify directly into the regular season.
- Associations below the top 10 can have one team qualify for the qualification round.

If a club who qualified for the regular season doesn't take the place, it will be given to another club who entered.

Rank	Association	Average points	Teams
1	Turkey	217.33	3
2	Spain	180.00	3
3	France	152.67	3
4	Hungary	126.67	2
5	Russia	109.33	0
6	Italy	87.33	2
7	Czech Republic	57.33	1
8	Poland	44.00	2
9	Belgium	27.33	0
10	Israel	20.67	0
11	Latvia	18.00	1
12	Greece	17.67	0
13	Romania	14.00	1
14	Switzerland	12.67	0

Rank	Association	Average points	Teams
15	Slovakia	7.33	0
16	Ukraine	6.33	0
17	Serbia	5.33	0
17	(United Kingdom) Great Britain	5.33	1
19	Portugal	4.00	0
19	Luxembourg	4.00	0
21	Germany	2.67	0
21	Lithuania	2.67	0
23	Croatia	2.00	0
23	Belarus	2.00	0
23	Sweden	2.00	0
26	Bulgaria	1.33	0
26	Iceland	1.33	0
28	Norway	0.67	0

== Teams ==
The teams were announced on 13 July 2024. League positions of the previous season shown in parentheses (TH EL: EuroLeague Women title holders; TH EC: EuroCup Women title holders). Also, S means that the team in the qualifying round was seeded.

Regular season
(Czech Republic) ZVVZ USK Praha (1st)	(Poland) AZS UMCS Lublin (1st)
(France) LDLC ASVEL Féminin^{TH EC} (1st)	(Spain) Valencia Basket (1st)
(France) Basket Landes (CW, 5th)	(Spain) Casademont Zaragoza (CW, 4th)
(France) ESB Villeneuve-d'Ascq (2nd)	(Spain) Perfumerias Avenida (2nd)
(Hungary) SERCO Uni Győr (2nd)	(Turkey) Fenerbahçe Alagoz Holding^{TH EL} (1st)
(Italy) Beretta Famila Schio (1st)	(Turkey) Çukurova Basketbol Mersin (2nd)
(Italy) Virtus Segafredo Bologna (2nd)
Qualifying round
(United Kingdom) London Lions (1st)	(Poland) KGHM BC Polkowice ^{S} (2nd)
(Hungary) DVTK HUN-Therm ^{S} (3rd)	(Romania) ACS Sepsi SIC (1st)
(Latvia) TTT Riga ^{S} (1st)	(Turkey) Beşiktaş (7th)

== Round and draw dates ==
=== Schedule ===
Phase	Round	Round date
Qualification round		20–27 September 2023
Regular season	Matchday 1	4 October 2023
Regular season	Matchday 2	11 October 2023
Regular season	Matchday 3	18 October 2023
Regular season	Matchday 4	25 October 2023
Regular season	Matchday 5	31 October 2023
Regular season	Matchday 6	22 November 2023
Regular season	Matchday 7	29 November 2023
Regular season	Matchday 8	6 December 2023
Regular season	Matchday 9	13 December 2023
Regular season	Matchday 10	20 December 2023
Regular season	Matchday 11	10 January 2024
Regular season	Matchday 12	17 January 2024
Regular season	Matchday 13	24 January 2024
Regular season	Matchday 14	30 January 2024
Quarter-finals	First leg	21 February 2024
Quarter-finals	Second leg	28 February 2024
Quarter-finals	Third leg	6 March 2024
Final four	Semi-finals	12 April 2024
Final four	Final	14 April 2024

=== Draw ===
The draw was held on 9 August 2023 in Munich, Germany.

Draw rules are as follows.

- A maximum of two clubs from the same country can be in the same regular season group for countries that have up to three clubs in total.
- Each group can have a maximum of two countries that are represented by two clubs each.
- If there are exactly two clubs from the same country, those clubs shall be drawn into different groups if possible.

Seed 1	Seed 2	Seed 3	Seed 4
(Turkey) Fenerbahçe Alagoz Holding (Spain) Perfumerías Avenida	(Italy) Beretta Famila Schio (Czech Republic) ZVVZ USK Praha	(Turkey) Çukurova Basketbol Mersin (Spain) Valencia Basket	(France) LDLC ASVEL Féminin (France) ESB Villeneuve-d'Ascq

Seed 5	Seed 6	Seed 7	Seed 8
(France) Basket Landes (Poland) AZS UMCS Lublin	(Italy) Virtus Segafredo Bologna (Spain) Casademont Zaragoza	(Hungary) SERCO Uni Győr (N/A) Qualifier 1 (Note: The eventual team in this slot was DVTK HUN-Therm.)	(N/A) Qualifier 2 (Note: The eventual team in this slot was ACS Sepsi SIC.) (N/A) Qualifier 3 (Note: The eventual team in this slot was KGHM BC Polkowice.)

== Qualification round ==
The winners advance to the regular season, while the losers drop down to the EuroCup regular season.

Team 1	Agg.	Team 2	1st leg	2nd leg
London Lions (United Kingdom)	121–135	(Hungary) DVTK HUN-Therm	48–63	73–72
ACS Sepsi SIC (Romania)	122–116	(Latvia) TTT Riga	59–54	63–62
Beşiktaş (Turkey)	121–136	(Poland) KGHM BC Polkowice	57–58	64–78

== Regular season ==
Location of teams of the 2023–24 Euroleague Women regular season.
Red: Group A; Green: Group B.

The top four teams in each group will qualify to the Quarterfinals.

If teams are level on record at the end of the regular season, tiebreakers are applied in the following order:

1. Head-to-head record
2. Head-to-head point differential
3. Head-to-head points scored
4. Point differential for the entire regular season
5. Points scored for the entire regular season

Casademont Zaragoza, AZS UMCS Lublin and ACS Sepsi SIC will make their debut, while SERCO Uni Győr and Villeneuve d'Ascq LM return after a seven year and five year absence respectively. EuroCup Women holders, LDLC ASVEL Féminin, return for the first time since 2020–21.

Eight national associations will be represented this season, down by one compared to 2022–23. Belgium and Greece are replaced solely by Romania, who are present in the regular season for the first time since 2012–13. This is the first time since 2020–21 that the regular season contains three French teams. Poland come into this season with two representatives in the regular season for the first time since 2017–18.

=== Group A ===
Pos	Team	Pld	W	L	PF	PA	PD	Pts	Qualification	FEN	DVTK	CAS	SCH	VAL	ASV	SEP	LUB
1	(Turkey) Fenerbahçe Alagoz Holding	14	12	2	1198	909	+289	26	Advance to quarter-finals	—	95–71	71–65	90–64	96–66	106–57	110–63	72–61
2	(Hungary) DVTK HUN-Therm	14	9	5	927	916	+11	23 (Note: DVTK HUN-Therm 3–1, Casademont Zaragoza 2–2, Beretta Famila Schio 1–3)	Advance to quarter-finals	64–81	—	66–63	73–69	67–56	70–64	72–54	74–44
3	(Spain) Casademont Zaragoza	14	9	5	943	875	+68	23	Advance to quarter-finals	71–74	70–68	—	56–51	59–47	63–60	85–57	96–49
4	(Italy) Beretta Famila Schio	14	9	5	996	951	+45	23	Advance to quarter-finals	75–67	55–59	73–59	—	77–72	84–58	88–72	70–50
5	(Spain) Valencia Basket	14	8	6	991	937	+54	22		64–88	84–59	85–56	87–60	—	70–91	68–57	64–45
6	(France) LDLC ASVEL Féminin	14	5	9	1021	1079	−58	19		89–81	57–67	64–67	83–90	61–70	—	94–77	73–72
7	(Romania) ACS Sepsi SIC	14	2	12	923	1108	−185	16 (Note: ACS Sepsi SIC 153–134 AZS UMCS Lublin)		49–82	68–80	68–69	58–70	61–71	86–85	—	88–58
8	(Poland) AZS UMCS Lublin	14	2	12	806	1030	−224	16		50–85	56–37	42–64	67–70	60–87	76–85	76–65	—

Source: FIBA
Legend: Blue = home team win; Red = away team win.
Rules for classification: 1) Points; 2) Points difference; 3) Points scored.

=== Group B ===
Pos	Team	Pld	W	L	PF	PA	PD	Pts	Qualification	PRA	CUK	VIL	AVE	VIR	POL	LAN	GYOR
1	(Czech Republic) ZVVZ USK Praha	14	12	2	1056	914	+142	26	Advance to quarter-finals	—	71–67	74–63	78–64	69–61	72–56	85–63	75–71
2	(Turkey) Çukurova Basketbol Mersin	14	9	5	961	948	+13	23	Advance to quarter-finals	56–77	—	54–70	77–82	64–61	77–57	79–75	75–63
3	(France) Villeneuve d'Ascq LM	14	8	6	1043	985	+58	22 (Note: Villeneuve d'Ascq LM 147–137 Perfumerías Avenida)	Advance to quarter-finals	90–81	60–69	—	82–58	78–62	85–72	74–61	93–92
4	(Spain) Perfumerías Avenida	14	8	6	943	922	+21	22	Advance to quarter-finals	53–64	67–56	79–65	—	58–62	75–66	69–44	56–42
5	(Italy) Virtus Segafredo Bologna	14	7	7	995	999	−4	21		69–90	65–73	65–62	79–75	—	90–69	74–66	76–70
6	(Poland) KGHM BC Polkowice	14	6	8	1026	1070	−44	20		75–68	59–66	77–61	73–78	81–78	—	88–72	92–82
7	(France) Basket Landes	14	4	10	956	1032	−76	18		62–69	70–72	80–71	69–48	70–68	75–81	—	83–75
8	(Hungary) SERCO Uni Győr	14	2	12	1000	1110	−110	16		64–83	71–76	61–89	65–81	74–85	91–80	79–66	—

Source: FIBA
Legend: Blue = home team win; Red = away team win.
Rules for classification: 1) Points; 2) Points difference; 3) Points scored.

== Quarter-finals ==
=== Format ===
The eight remaining teams are divided into four playoffs, played in a best-of-three format. The first team to win two games wins the tie. If needed, a game three will take place with the team who had the higher seed hosting the match.

=== Seeding ===
The seeding is based on the results of the regular season.

Group	1st	2nd	3rd	4th
A	(Turkey) Fenerbahçe Alagoz Holding	(Hungary) DVTK HUN-Therm	(Spain) Casademont Zaragoza	(Italy) Beretta Famila Schio
B	(Czech Republic) ZVVZ USK Praha	(Turkey) Çukurova Basketbol Mersin	(France) Villeneuve d'Ascq LM	(Spain) Perfumerías Avenida

=== Bracket ===
Villeneuve d'Ascq LM became the first unseeded team in seven years to win a series.

Team 1	Series	Team 2	Game 1	Game 2	Game 3
Fenerbahçe Alagoz Holding (Turkey)	2–0	(Spain) Perfumerías Avenida	98–91	73–67	
DVTK HUN-Therm (Hungary)	1–2	(France) Villeneuve d'Ascq LM	78–66	59–63	58–73
ZVVZ USK Praha (Czech Republic)	2–1	(Italy) Beretta Famila Schio	78–60	61–73	74–54
Çukurova Basketbol Mersin (Turkey)	2–1	(Spain) Casademont Zaragoza	79–62	56–57	86–63

=== Matches ===
21 February 2024
19:00

Report

Fenerbahçe Alagoz Holding (Turkey)	98–91	(Spain) Perfumerías Avenida
Scoring by quarter: 30–24, 23–20, 24–20, 21–27
Pts: McBride 27; Rebs: Collier 9 Asts: McBride 8		Pts: Prince 22; Rebs: Carter 6 Asts: Carter 6

Metro Energy Sports Hall, Istanbul
Attendance: 1,900
Referees: Nikola Perlic (CRO), Veronika Obertova (SVK), Paulina Karolina Gajdosz (POL)

28 February 2024
20:30

Report

Perfumerías Avenida (Spain)	67–73	(Turkey) Fenerbahçe Alagoz Holding
Scoring by quarter: 19–15, 17–15, 6–22, 25–21
Pts: Carter, Rodriguez 14; Rebs: Koné 7 Asts: Cakir, Carter 4		Pts: Anderson 15; Rebs: Milić 10; Asts: Uzun 7

Pabellón Municipal Wurzburg, Salamanca
Attendance: 2,400
Referees: Lukasz Jankowski (POL), Edgard Ceccarelli (FRA), Alessandro Perciavalle (ITA)

Fenerbahçe Alagoz Holding won the series 2–0

21 February 2024
18:00

Report

DVTK HUN-Therm (Hungary)	78–66	(France) Villeneuve d'Ascq LM
Scoring by quarter: 14–26, 21–10, 25–15, 18–15
Pts: Charles 18; Rebs: Charles 10; Asts: Kanyasi 6		Pts: Burke 17; Rebs: Mbaka 6 Asts: Smalls 3

DVTK Arena, Miskolc
Attendance: 3,000
Referees: Lukasz Jankowski (POL), Esperanza Mendoza (ESP), Alexandra-Ioana Stan (ROU)

28 February 2024
20:00

Report

Villeneuve d'Ascq LM (France)	63–59	(Hungary) DVTK HUN-Therm
Scoring by quarter: 8–21, 25–13, 17–12, 13–13
Pts: Salaün 24; Rebs: Diaby 9 Asts: Burke, Zellous 3		Pts: Garbin 16; Rebs: Charles 9 Asts: four players

Palacium, Villeneuve d' Ascq
Attendance: 2,000
Referees: Özlem Yalman (TUR), Petr Hrusa (CZE), Arnau Padros (ESP)

6 March 2024
18:00

Report

DVTK HUN-Therm (Hungary)	58–73	(France) Villeneuve d'Ascq LM
Scoring by quarter: 15–23, 11–15, 18–18, 14–17
Pts: Charles 11; Rebs: Lelik 9 Asts: Lelik 5		Pts: Smalls 18; Rebs: Diaby 12; Asts: Burke 5

DVTK Arena, Miskolc
Attendance: 3,400
Referees: Ariadna Chueca (ESP), Sinisa Prpa (SRB), Juozas Barkauskas (LTU)

Villeneuve d'Ascq LM won the series 2–1

21 February 2024
19:00

Report

ZVVZ USK Praha (Czech Republic)	78–60	(Italy) Beretta Famila Schio
Scoring by quarter: 25–8, 15–21, 23–14, 15–17
Pts: Magbegor 15; Rebs: Magbegor 10; Asts: Cazorla 7		Pts: Guirantes 12; Rebs: Juhász 7 Asts: Crippa, Verona 4

Kralovka Arena, Prague
Attendance: 800
Referees: Ciprian Stoica (ROU), Amel Dahra (FRA), Cisil Güngör (TUR)

28 February 2024
20:00

Report

Beretta Famila Schio (Italy)	73–61	(Czech Republic) ZVVZ USK Praha
Scoring by quarter: 16–20, 23–12, 25–19, 9–10
Pts: Guirantes 17; Rebs: Juhász 13; Asts: Sottana 6		Pts: Ayayi 19; Rebs: three players 7 Asts: Ayayi 5

Palasport Livio Romare, Schio
Attendance: 1,900
Referees: Nemanja Ninkovic (SRB), Yasmina Alcaraz (ESP), Jelena Tomic (CRO)

6 March 2024
19:00

Report

ZVVZ USK Praha (Czech Republic)	74–54	(Italy) Beretta Famila Schio
Scoring by quarter: 16–16, 18–9, 20–17, 20–12
Pts: Sabally 19; Rebs: Conde 11; Asts: Cazorla 7		Pts: Juhász 15; Rebs: Juhász 11; Asts: Guirantes 4

Kralovka Arena, Prague
Attendance: 950
Referees: Viola Györgyi (ROU), Özlem Yalman (TUR), Valentin Oliot (FRA)

ZVVZ USK Praha won the series 2–1

21 February 2024
19:30

Report

Çukurova Basketbol Mersin (Turkey)	79–62	(Spain) Casademont Zaragoza
Scoring by quarter: 26–22, 25–20, 15–12, 13–8
Pts: Mabrey 26; Rebs: Epoupa 10; Asts: Mabrey 7		Pts: Fiebich 11; Rebs: three players 5 Asts: Ortiz 4

Servet Tazegul Spor Salonu, Mersin
Attendance: 7,850
Referees: Zoran Mitrovski (NMK), Ivana Ivanovic (SRB), Tijmen Last (NED)

28 February 2024
20:00

Report

Casademont Zaragoza (Spain)	57–56	(Turkey) Çukurova Basketbol Mersin
Scoring by quarter: 9–15, 18–15, 18–9, 12–17
Pts: Diallo 14; Rebs: Ortiz 6 Asts: Atkinson 5		Pts: Copper 17; Rebs: Mavunga 8 Asts: Copper 4

Pabellón Príncipe Felipe, Zaragoza
Attendance: 5,626
Referees: Silvia Marziali (ITA), Alexandre Maret (FRA), Nikola Perlic (CRO)

6 March 2024
19:30

Report

Çukurova Basketbol Mersin (Turkey)	86–63	(Spain) Casademont Zaragoza
Scoring by quarter: 23–11, 21–22, 21–8, 21–22
Pts: Copper 18; Rebs: Mavunga 10; Asts: Mabrey 14		Pts: Fiebich, Gimeno 12; Rebs: Diallo 7 Asts: Ortiz 5

Servet Tazegul Spor Salonu, Mersin
Attendance: 7,920
Referees: Radomir Vojinovic (MNE), Paulina Karolina Gajdosz (POL), Blaz Zupancic (SLO)

Çukurova Basketbol Mersin won the series 2–1

== Final Four ==
The Final Four was held at the Servet Tazegul Spor Salonu in Mersin, Turkey.

=== Bracket ===
Semifinals
12 April
(Turkey) Fenerbahçe Alagoz Holding	89
(Turkey) Çukurova Basketbol Mersin	80
12 April
(Czech Republic) ZVVZ USK Praha	78
(France) Villeneuve d'Ascq LM	84

Final
14 April
(Turkey) Fenerbahçe Alagoz Holding	106
(France) Villeneuve d'Ascq LM	73
Third place
14 April
(Turkey) Çukurova Basketbol Mersin	67
(Czech Republic) ZVVZ USK Praha	95

=== Semifinals ===
12 April 2024
16:00

Report

ZVVZ USK Praha (Czech Republic)	78–84	(France) Villeneuve d'Ascq LM
Scoring by quarter: 27–26, 16–11, 19–26, 16–21
Pts: Ayayi 24; Rebs: three players 6 Asts: Cazorla 6		Pts: Smalls 18; Rebs: Diaby 9 Asts: Salaün, Smalls 7

Servet Tazegul Spor Salonu, Mersin
Attendance: 2,500
Referees: Cecília Montgomery-Tóth (HUN), Viola Györgyi (ROU), Petar Pesic (SRB)

12 April 2024
19:00

Report

Fenerbahçe Alagoz Holding (Turkey)	89–80	(Turkey) Çukurova Basketbol Mersin
Scoring by quarter: 27–20, 21–22, 18–20, 23–18
Pts: McBride 25; Rebs: Milić 11; Asts: Anderson, Meesseman 6		Pts: Mavunga 20; Rebs: Mavunga 8 Asts: Mabrey 8

Servet Tazegul Spor Salonu, Mersin
Attendance: 6,000
Referees: Ariadna Chueca (ESP), Paulo Marques (POR), Gvidas Gedvilas (LTU)

=== Third place game ===
14 April 2024
16:00

Report

Çukurova Basketbol Mersin (Turkey)	67–95	(Czech Republic) ZVVZ USK Praha
Scoring by quarter: 18–25, 18–27, 20–14, 11–29
Pts: Kiss 19; Rebs: Copper, Époupa 7 Asts: Mabrey 6		Pts: Ayayi 21; Rebs: Magbegor 10; Asts: Cazorla 6

Servet Tazegul Spor Salonu, Mersin
Attendance: 1,000
Referees: Paulo Marques (POR), Paulina Karolina Gajdosz (POL), Franko Gracin (CRO)

=== Final ===
14 April 2024
19:00

Report

Fenerbahçe Alagoz Holding (Turkey)	106–73	(France) Villeneuve d'Ascq LM
Scoring by quarter: 28–27, 30–18, 19–16, 29–12
Pts: Collier 33; Rebs: Collier 8 Asts: Anderson 13		Pts: Burke, Zellous 17; Rebs: Salaün 9 Asts: Lisowa-Mbaka 5

Servet Tazegul Spor Salonu, Mersin
Attendance: 6,000
Referees: Ariadna Chueca (ESP), Viola Györgyi (ROU), Gvidas Gedvilas (LTU)

2023–24 EuroLeague Women Champions

Fenerbahçe Alagoz Holding
Second title

== Awards ==
Voting for the awards started on 18 February 2024.

=== EuroLeague MVP ===
Player	Team	Ref.
(Belgium) Emma Meesseman	(Turkey) Fenerbahçe Alagoz Holding	

=== EuroLeague Final Four MVP ===
Player	Team	Ref.
(United States) Kayla McBride	(Turkey) Fenerbahçe Alagoz Holding	

=== All-EuroLeague Teams ===
First Team		Second Team	
(United States) Marina Mabrey	(Turkey) Çukurova Basketbol Mersin	(Serbia) Yvonne Anderson	(Turkey) Fenerbahçe Alagoz Holding
(United States) Kayla McBride	(Turkey) Fenerbahçe Alagoz Holding	(United States) Kennedy Burke	(France) ESB Villeneuve-d'Ascq
(Germany) Leonie Fiebich	(Spain) Casademont Zaragoza	(France) Valériane Ayayi	(Czech Republic) ZVVZ USK Praha
(Belgium) Emma Meesseman	(Turkey) Fenerbahçe Alagoz Holding	(France) Janelle Salaün	(France) ESB Villeneuve-d'Ascq
(Australia) Ezi Magbegor	(Czech Republic) ZVVZ USK Praha	(United States) Elizabeth Williams	(Turkey) Çukurova Basketbol Mersin

=== Defensive Player of the Year ===
Player	Team	Ref.
(Serbia) Yvonne Anderson	(Turkey) Fenerbahçe Alagoz Holding	

=== Young Player of the Year ===
Player	Team	Ref.
(Mali) Sika Koné	(Spain) Perfumerias Avenida	

=== Coach of the Year ===
Player	Team	Ref.
(France) Rachid Meziane	(France) ESB Villeneuve-d'Ascq	

=== Best Play of the Season ===
Player	Team	Ref.
(United States) Destiny Slocum	(Hungary) SERCO Uni Győr	

=== Club Excellence Award ===
Team	Ref.
(Spain) Casademont Zaragoza	

=== MVP of the Month ===
Month	Player	Team	Ref.
October	(United States) Kayla McBride	(Turkey) Fenerbahçe Alagoz Holding	
November	(Belgium) Emma Meesseman	(Turkey) Fenerbahçe Alagoz Holding	
December	(United States) Kennedy Burke	(France) ESB Villeneuve-d'Ascq	
January	(United States) Marina Mabrey	(Turkey) Çukurova Basketbol Mersin	
February	(United States) Napheesa Collier	(Turkey) Fenerbahçe Alagoz Holding	

=== Team of the Month ===
Round	PG	SG	SF	PF	C
October	(United States) Kayla McBride ( (Turkey) Fenerbahçe Alagoz Holding)	(Italy) Cecilia Zandalasini ( (Italy) Virtus Segafredo Bologna)	(Germany) Leonie Fiebich ( (Spain) Casademont Zaragoza)	(Belgium) Emma Meesseman ( (Turkey) Fenerbahçe Alagoz Holding)	(Australia) Ezi Magbegor ( (Czech Republic) ZVVZ USK Praha)
November	(Spain) Mariona Ortiz ( (Spain) Casademont Zaragoza)	(United States) Marina Mabrey ( (Turkey) Çukurova Basketbol Mersin)	(Mali) Sika Koné ( (Spain) Perfumerias Avenida)	(Belgium) Emma Meesseman ( (Turkey) Fenerbahçe Alagoz Holding)	(Germany) Nyara Sabally ( (Czech Republic) ZVVZ USK Praha)
December	(United States) Kayla McBride ( (Turkey) Fenerbahçe Alagoz Holding)	(Azerbaijan) Brianna Fraser ( (Poland) KGHM BC Polkowice)	(United States) Kennedy Burke ( (France) ESB Villeneuve-d'Ascq)	(Belgium) Emma Meesseman ( (Turkey) Fenerbahçe Alagoz Holding)	(Germany) Nyara Sabally ( (Czech Republic) ZVVZ USK Praha)
January	(Puerto Rico) Arella Guirantes ( (Italy) Beretta Famila Schio)	(United States) Marina Mabrey ( (Turkey) Çukurova Basketbol Mersin)	(United States) Kennedy Burke ( (France) ESB Villeneuve-d'Ascq)	(Belgium) Emma Meesseman ( (Turkey) Fenerbahçe Alagoz Holding)	(Spain) Laura Gil ( (Spain) Perfumerias Avenida)
February	(Serbia) Yvonne Anderson ( (Turkey) Fenerbahçe Alagoz Holding)	(Hungary) Réka Lelik ( (Hungary) DVTK HUN-Therm)	(United States) Napheesa Collier ( (Turkey) Fenerbahçe Alagoz Holding)	(France) Janelle Salaün ( (France) ESB Villeneuve-d'Ascq)	(Australia) Ezi Magbegor ( (Czech Republic) ZVVZ USK Praha)

=== MVP of the Round ===
Regular season

Round	PG	SG	SF	PF	C
1	(Italy) Cecilia Zandalasini ( (Italy) Virtus Segafredo Bologna)	(United States) Kayla McBride ( (Turkey) Fenerbahçe Alagoz Holding)	(United States) Kennedy Burke ( (France) ESB Villeneuve-d'Ascq)	(Australia) Ezi Magbegor ( (Czech Republic) ZVVZ USK Praha)	(United Kingdom) Kristine Anigwe ( (Hungary) SERCO Uni Győr)
2	(Italy) Cecilia Zandalasini ( (Italy) Virtus Segafredo Bologna)	(United States) Kayla McBride ( (Turkey) Fenerbahçe Alagoz Holding)	(United States) Napheesa Collier ( (Turkey) Fenerbahçe Alagoz Holding)	(Australia) Ezi Magbegor ( (Czech Republic) ZVVZ USK Praha)	(United States) Elizabeth Williams ( (Turkey) Fenerbahçe Alagoz Holding)
3	(United States) Kayla McBride ( (Turkey) Fenerbahçe Alagoz Holding)	(Germany) Leonie Fiebich ( (Spain) Casademont Zaragoza)	(Sweden) Elin Gustavsson ( (Poland) AZS UMCS Lublin)	(Australia) Ezi Magbegor ( (Czech Republic) ZVVZ USK Praha)	(United Kingdom) Kristine Anigwe ( (Hungary) SERCO Uni Győr)
4	(Spain) Maite Cazorla ( (Czech Republic) ZVVZ USK Praha)	(United States) Destiny Slocum ( (Hungary) SERCO Uni Győr)	(Ukraine) Alina Iagupova ( (Turkey) Çukurova Basketbol Mersin)	(Belgium) Emma Meesseman ( (Turkey) Fenerbahçe Alagoz Holding)	(France) Ana Tadić ( (Hungary) DVTK HUN-Therm)
5	(Hungary) Nina Aho ( (Hungary) DVTK HUN-Therm)	(Poland) Weronika Gajda ( (Poland) KGHM BC Polkowice)	(Puerto Rico) Arella Guirantes ( (Italy) Beretta Famila Schio)	(Germany) Nyara Sabally ( (Czech Republic) ZVVZ USK Praha)	(Serbia) Dragana Stanković ( (Poland) KGHM BC Polkowice)
6	(United States) Marina Mabrey ( (Turkey) Çukurova Basketbol Mersin)	(France) Gabby Williams ( (France) LDLC ASVEL Féminin)	(Mali) Sika Koné ( (Spain) Perfumerias Avenida)	(Belgium) Emma Meesseman ( (Turkey) Fenerbahçe Alagoz Holding)	(Serbia) Nikolina Milić ( (Turkey) Fenerbahçe Alagoz Holding)
7	(Spain) Mariona Ortiz ( (Spain) Casademont Zaragoza)	(Bulgaria) Borislava Hristova ( (Romania) ACS Sepsi SIC)	(Germany) Leonie Fiebich ( (Spain) Valencia Basket)	(Belgium) Emma Meesseman ( (Turkey) Fenerbahçe Alagoz Holding)	(United States) Natasha Howard ( (Turkey) Fenerbahçe Alagoz Holding)
8	(United States) Veronica Burton ( (Poland) AZS UMCS Lublin)	(Bulgaria) Borislava Hristova ( (Romania) ACS Sepsi SIC)	(Azerbaijan) Brianna Fraser ( (Poland) KGHM BC Polkowice)	(Belgium) Emma Meesseman ( (Turkey) Fenerbahçe Alagoz Holding)	(United States) Elizabeth Williams ( (Turkey) Fenerbahçe Alagoz Holding)
9	(United States) Morgan Green ( (Romania) ACS Sepsi SIC)	(United States) Kayla McBride ( (Turkey) Fenerbahçe Alagoz Holding)	(Ivory Coast) Kariata Diaby ( (France) ESB Villeneuve-d'Ascq)	(United States) Natasha Howard ( (Turkey) Fenerbahçe Alagoz Holding)	(United States) Elizabeth Williams ( (Turkey) Çukurova Basketbol Mersin)
10	(United States) Morgan Green ( (Romania) ACS Sepsi SIC)	(United States) Kayla McBride ( (Turkey) Fenerbahçe Alagoz Holding)	(United States) Kennedy Burke ( (France) ESB Villeneuve-d'Ascq)	(Netherlands) Emese Hof ( (Czech Republic) ZVVZ USK Praha)	(Australia) Ezi Magbegor ( (Czech Republic) ZVVZ USK Praha)
11	(United States) Marina Mabrey ( (Turkey) Çukurova Basketbol Mersin)	(Spain) Queralt Casas ( (Spain) Valencia Basket)	(Germany) Leonie Fiebich ( (Spain) Casademont Zaragoza)	(Poland) Aleksandra Zięmborska ( (Poland) AZS UMCS Lublin)	(Australia) Ezi Magbegor ( (Czech Republic) ZVVZ USK Praha)
12	(United States) Marina Mabrey ( (Turkey) Çukurova Basketbol Mersin)	(Canada) Bridget Carleton ( (Hungary) SERCO Uni Győr)	(Spain) Alba Torrens ( (Spain) Valencia Basket)	(United States) Kennedy Burke ( (France) ESB Villeneuve-d'Ascq)	(Belgium) Emma Meesseman ( (Turkey) Fenerbahçe Alagoz Holding)
13	(United States) Marina Mabrey ( (Turkey) Çukurova Basketbol Mersin)	(France) Marine Johannès ( (France) LDLC ASVEL Féminin)	(France) Alexia Chartereau ( (France) LDLC ASVEL Féminin)	(Spain) Laura Gil ( (Spain) Perfumerias Avenida)	(North Macedonia) Merritt Hempe ( (Spain) Valencia Basket)
14	(Spain) Mariona Ortiz ( (Spain) Casademont Zaragoza)	(France) Gabby Williams ( (France) LDLC ASVEL Féminin)	(United States) Nadia Fingall ( (Spain) Valencia Basket)	(Spain) Nerea Hermosa ( (Spain) Casademont Zaragoza)	(Belgium) Emma Meesseman ( (Turkey) Fenerbahçe Alagoz Holding)

Playoffs

Round	PG	SG	SF	PF	C
1	(United States) Marina Mabrey ( (Turkey) Çukurova Basketbol Mersin)	(United States) Kayla McBride ( (Turkey) Fenerbahçe Alagoz Holding)	(United States) Kaila Charles ( (Hungary) DVTK HUN-Therm)	(United States) Napheesa Collier ( (Turkey) Fenerbahçe Alagoz Holding)	(Australia) Ezi Magbegor ( (Czech Republic) ZVVZ USK Praha)
2	(Puerto Rico) Arella Guirantes ( (Italy) Beretta Famila Schio)	(United States) Kennedy Burke ( (France) ESB Villeneuve-d'Ascq)	(France) Valériane Ayayi ( (Czech Republic) ZVVZ USK Praha)	(France) Janelle Salaün ( (France) ESB Villeneuve-d'Ascq)	(Serbia) Nikolina Milić ( (Turkey) Fenerbahçe Alagoz Holding)
3	(United States) Marina Mabrey ( (Turkey) Çukurova Basketbol Mersin)	(Hungary) Réka Lelik ( (Hungary) DVTK HUN-Therm)	(Germany) Nyara Sabally ( (Czech Republic) ZVVZ USK Praha)	(France) Janelle Salaün ( (France) ESB Villeneuve-d'Ascq)	(Ivory Coast) Kariata Diaby ( (France) ESB Villeneuve-d'Ascq)

Final four

Round	PG	SG	SF	PF	C
Semifinals	(France) Olivia Époupa ( (Turkey) Çukurova Basketbol Mersin)	(United States) Kamiah Smalls ( (France) ESB Villeneuve-d'Ascq)	(United States) Kayla McBride ( (Turkey) Fenerbahçe Alagoz Holding)	(France) Valériane Ayayi ( (Czech Republic) ZVVZ USK Praha)	(Serbia) Nikolina Milić ( (Turkey) Fenerbahçe Alagoz Holding)

== Marketing ==
For the first time, FIBA Europe gave out digital medals.

== See also ==
- 2023–24 EuroCup Women
- 2023–24 EuroCup Women qualification round
- 2023 FIBA Europe SuperCup Women
- 2023–24 EuroLeague
