= 2023–24 EuroCup Women qualification round =

EuroCup Women qualification round
- Season: 2023–24
- Dates: 21–28 September 2023
- Games played: 6
- Teams: 6 (from 6 countries)

The 2023–24 EuroCup Women qualification round decided the final three teams in the regular season.

== Format ==
Six teams were divided into three play offs, where the winners on aggregate advanced to the regular season.

== Teams ==
Location of teams of the 2023–24 EuroLeague Women Qualification Round.
Orange: Play Off 1; Green: Play Off 2; Deep Pink: Play Off 3.

Teams
(Czech Republic) Ostrava
(Greece) Eleftheria Moschatou
(Portugal) Sportiva Azoris Hotels
(Romania) CS Universitatea Cluj
(Slovakia) MBK Ružomberok
(Turkey) Antalya Toroslar BC

Location of teams in 2023–24 EuroCup Women Qualification Round (Azores).
Green: Play Off 2.

== Draw ==
The draw took place in Munich, Germany on the 9 August 2023. The bold text means which teams advanced.

| Seeded | Unseeded |
|---|---|
| (Slovakia) **MBK Ružomberok** (Greece) **Eleftheria Moschatou** (Portugal) Sportiva Azoris Hotels | (Turkey) **Antalya Toroslar BC** (Romania) CS Universitatea Cluj (Czech Republic) Ostrava |

== Matches ==
The three winners on aggregate advanced to the regular season.

| Team 1 | Agg. | Team 2 | 1st leg | 2nd leg |
|---|---|---|---|---|
| Ostrava (Czech Republic) | 94–115 | (Slovakia) **MBK Ružomberok** | 45–59 | 49–56 |
| **Antalya Toroslar BC** (Turkey) | 131–110 | (Portugal) Sportiva Azoris Hotels | 66–49 | 65–61 |
| CS Universitatea Cluj (Romania) | 107–127 | (Greece) **Eleftheria Moschatou** | 47–62 | 60–65 |

All times are local.

21 September
18:00

Boxscore

| Ostrava (Czech Republic) | 45–**59** | (Slovakia) **MBK Ružomberok** |
Scoring by quarter: 11–**18**, 9–9, 10–**11**, 15–**21**
| Pts: Little 11; Rebs: Little 10; Asts: Little 4 | | Pts: Yatskovets 17; Rebs: Hadacova 14; Asts: Mikovcakova 9 |

Tatran Hall, Ostrava
Attendance: 350
Referees: Ritvars Helmsteins (LAT), Tomasz Wit Langowski (POL), Elvis Binders-Coders (LAT)

28 September
17:00

Boxscore

| **MBK Ružomberok** (Slovakia) | **56**–49 | (Czech Republic) Ostrava |
Scoring by quarter: **16**–7, 4–**14**, 17–**18**, **19**–10
| Pts: Yatskovets 14; Rebs: Yatskovets 14; Asts: Havranova 4 | | Pts: Little 9 Rebs: Little 7 Asts: Motycakova 2 |

Športová hala Koniareň, Ružomberok
Attendance: 550
Referees: Özlem Yalman (Turkey), Viktor Nagy (Hungary), Josip Mikilic (Croatia)

MBK Ružomberok won 115–94 on aggregate

20 September
15:00

Boxscore

| **Antalya Toroslar BC** (Turkey) | **66**–49 | (Portugal) Sportiva Azoris Hotels |
Scoring by quarter: **21**–7, 6–**17**, **18**–10, **21**–15
| Pts: Bone, Henderson 20; Rebs: Bone 17; Asts: Kavurmacioglu 8 | | Pts: Warren 13; Rebs: Pereira 18; Asts: Serranho 5 |

Antalya Sport Arena, Muratpasa
Attendance: 400
Referees: Jan Baloun (CZE), Nir Meirson (ISR), Nikolaos Tziopanos (GRE)

28 September
20:30

Boxscore

| Sportiva Azoris Hotels (Portugal) | 61–**65** | (Turkey) **Antalya Toroslar BC** |
Scoring by quarter: 20–**21**, 11–**15**, **19**–9, 11–**20**
| Pts: Tamutyte 15; Rebs: Pereira 13; Asts: Carregosa, Serranho 3 | | Pts: Henderson 18; Rebs: Kavurmacioglu 7 Asts: Henderson 6 |

Pavilhão Sidónio Serpa, Ponta Delgada
Attendance: 500
Referees: Arnau Padros (Spain), Laure Coanus (France), James Kerry Dominique (Gibraltar)

Antalya Toroslar BC won 131–110 on aggregate

21 September
18:00

Boxscore

| CS Universitatea Cluj (Romania) | 47–**62** | (Greece) **Eleftheria Moschatou** |
Scoring by quarter: 11–11, 11–**20**, **19**–15, 6–**16**
| Pts: Pana 10; Rebs: Pavel 15; Asts: Pana 5 | | Pts: Zec 22; Rebs: Zec 11; Asts: Pangalos, Spatharou 3 |

BTarena, Cluj-Napoca
Attendance: 1,100
Referees: Vladimir Jevtovic (SRB), Nemanja Ninkovic (SRB), Mikheil Vartanov (GEO)

27 September
19:30

Boxscore

| **Eleftheria Moschatou** (Greece) | **65**–60 | (Romania) CS Universitatea Cluj |
Scoring by quarter: **19**–16, **18**–13, **21**–20, 7–**11**
| Pts: Zec 12; Rebs: Kiser 10; Asts: Spatharou 7 | | Pts: Pavel 26; Rebs: Pavel 14; Asts: Pana 11 |

Eleftheria Moschatou Basketball Arena, Moschato
Attendance: 450
Referees: Jelena Tomic (Croatia), Zoran Mitrovski (North Macedonia), Alakbar Hasanov (Azerbaijan)

Eleftheria Moschatou won 127–107 on aggregate

== See also ==
- 2023–24 EuroCup Women
- 2023–24 EuroLeague Women
- 2023 FIBA Europe SuperCup Women
- 2023–24 EuroLeague Women qualification round
