= Nikolina Milić =

Serbian basketball player (born 1994)

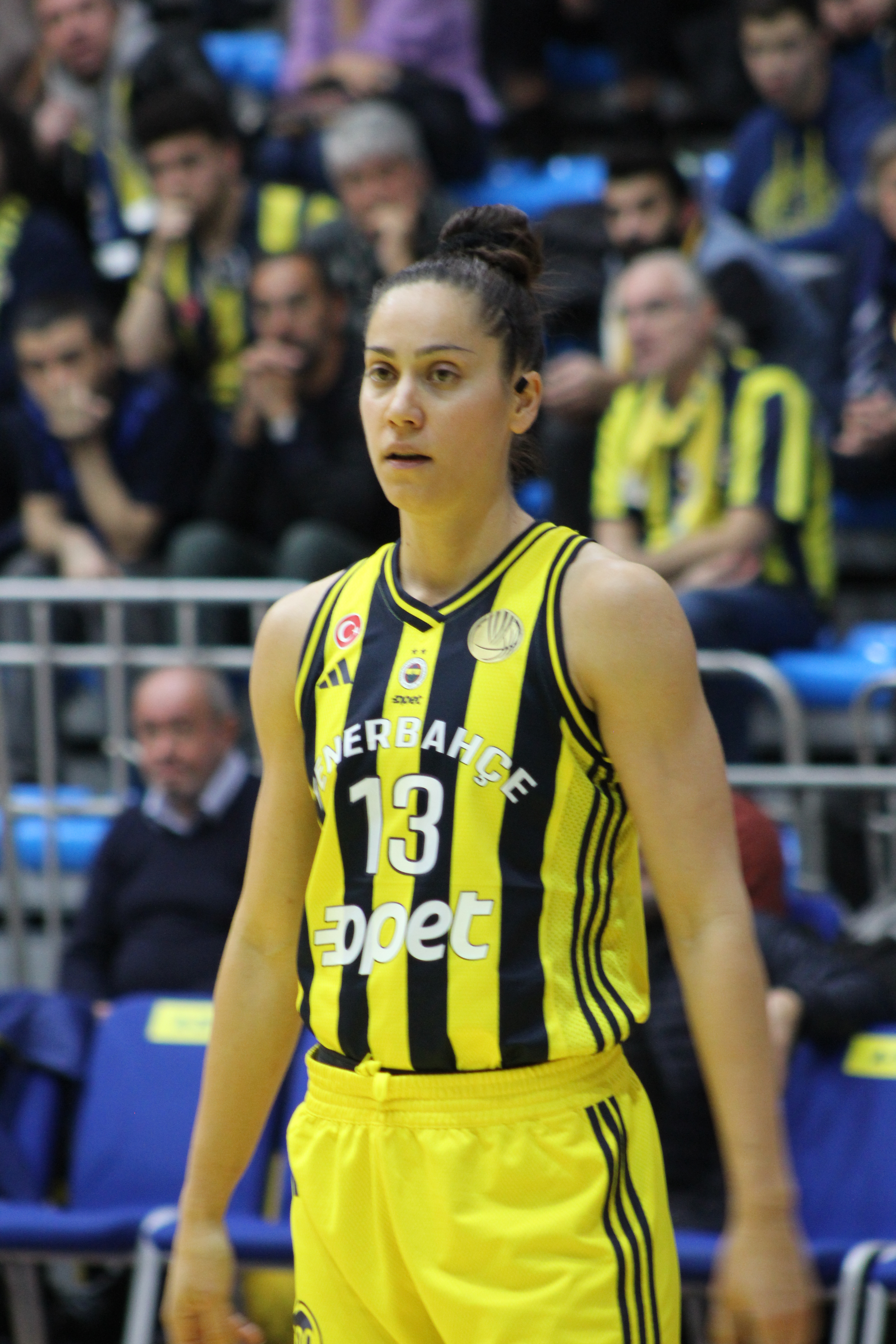
- Milić with the Fenerbahçe in 2024

Personal information
- Born: April 12, 1994 (age 32) Trebinje, Republika Srpska, Bosnia and Herzegovina
- Listed height: 1.91 m (6 ft 3 in)
- Listed weight: 82 kg (181 lb)

Career information
- Playing career: 2008–present
- Position: Center

Career history
- 2008–2009: Neimarstvo Trebinje
- 2009–2010: Borac ML-IEFK Banja Luka
- 2012–2014: Radnički Kragujevac
- 2014–2015: Gesam Gas Lucca
- 2015–2016: C.U.S. Cagliari
- 2016–2018: Royal Castors Braine
- 2018–2019: Pallacanestro Femminile Broni
- 2019–2020: Lointek Gernika Bizkaia
- 2020–2021: Perfumerias Avenida
- 2021–2022: KSC Szekszárd
- 2022–2023: Minnesota Lynx
- 2022–2023: Flammes Carolo
- 2023–2025: Fenerbahçe
- 2025: Beşiktaş
- 2025–2026: Fenerbahçe
- 2026: Toronto Tempo

Career highlights
- 2× EuroLeague champion (2024, 2026); 2× FIBA Europe SuperCup Women champion (2023, 2024); 3× Turkish Super League champion (2024–2026); 2× Turkish Cup champion (2024, 2026); Turkish Super Cup champion (2024); 2× Triple Crown (2024, 2026)
- Stats at Basketball Reference
Medals
Women's basketball
Representing Serbia
EuroBasket
Bronze medal – third place	2019 Serbia/Latvia

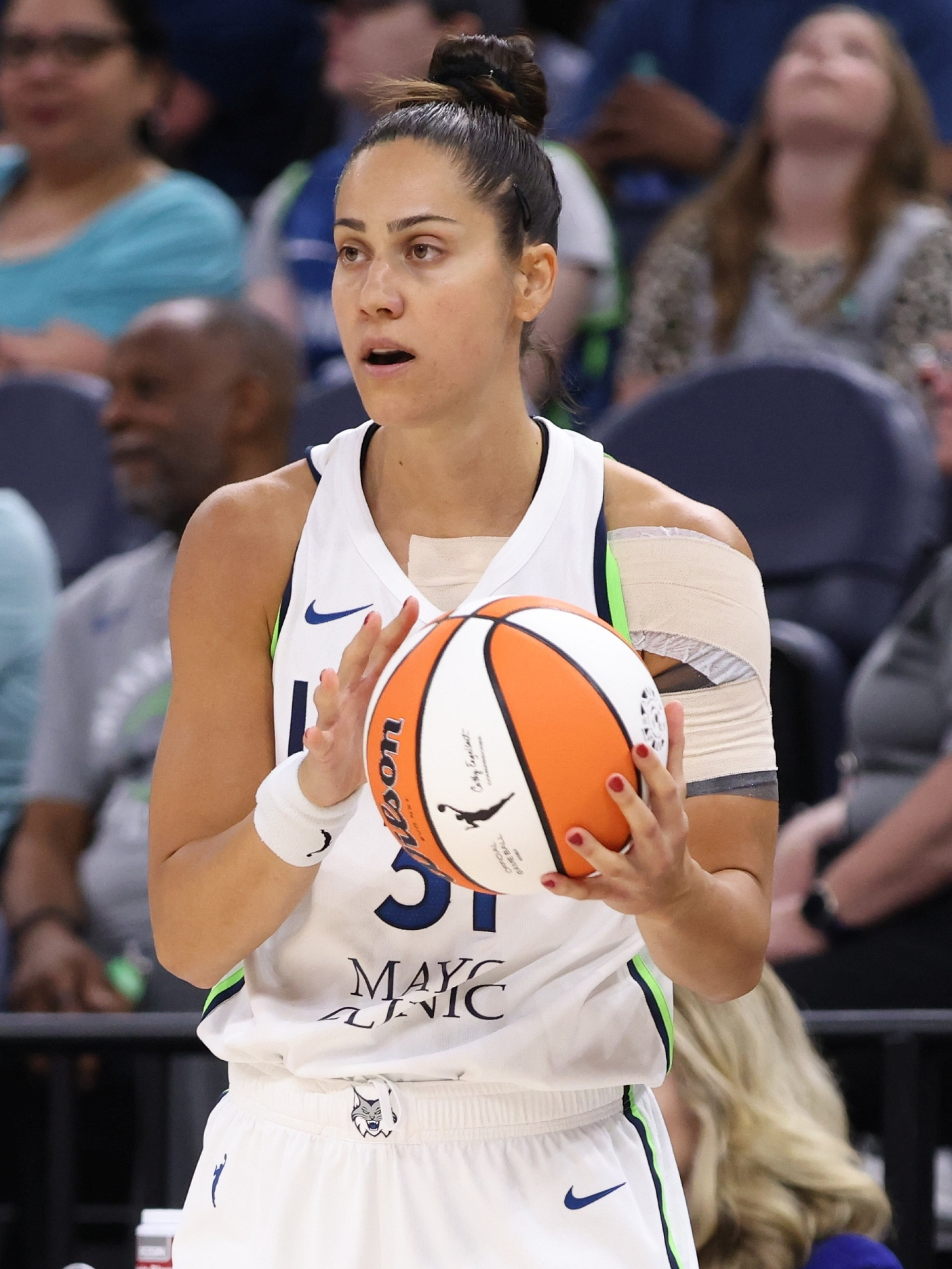
Milić with the Minnesota Lynx in 2023

Nikolina Milić (Serbian Cyrillic: Николина Милић; born April 12, 1994) is a Serbian professional basketball center who most recenlt played for the Toronto Tempo of the Women's National Basketball Association (WNBA) and Fenerbahçe of the Women's Basketball Super League.

She represented Serbian national basketball team at the FIBA Women's EuroBasket 2019 in Serbia and Latvia, where they won the bronze medal.

== Honours ==
=== Club ===
- EuroLeague Women
  - Championship (2) 2024, 2026
- FIBA Europe SuperCup Women
  - Championship (2) 2023, 2024
- Belgian Women's Basketball League
  - Championship (2) 2017, 2018
- Belgian Basketball Cup
  - Championship (1) 2017
- Liga Femenina
  - Championship (1) 2021
- Supercopa de Femenino
  - Championship (1) 2020
- Copa Castilla y León Femenino
  - Championship (1) 2021
- Nemzeti Bajnokság
  - Championship (1) 2022
- Turkish Women's Basketball Super League
  - Championship (3) 2024, 2025, 2026
- Turkish Cup
  - Championship (2) 2024, 2026
- Turkish Super Cup
  - Championship (1) 2024
- Triple Crown (1) : 2024

== WNBA ==
Milić signed with the Minnesota Lynx on 6 May 2022, to a hardship contract. Milić played in 17 games for the Lynx including 3 starts. She scored a career-high in points against the Indiana Fever with 23 points, including 13 in the third quarter alone, on 11 for 19 shooting, along with six rebounds, and three assists. Head Coach Cheryl Reeve stated that she had been looking at Milić to come over after coaching against her during Olympic play and that she really started to figure things out as she got more time on the court during her rookie season. On June 23, 2022, Milić was released from her hardship contract as Sylvia Fowles was cleared to comeback to play. Milić signed a 7-Day Contract to return to the Lynx on June 26, 2022. On 10 August 2022, Milić was released from her Hardship Contract when Aerial Powers became healthy again.

In February 2024, it was reported that Milić planned to sit out the 2024 WNBA season. On 14 April 2024, Milić was traded to the Chicago Sky alongside the 2024 7th overall pick, in exchange for Sika Koné, the 8th overall pick in 2024, a 2025 2nd round pick, and the rights to swap a 2026 1st round pick.

On 5 February 2025, the rights to Milić and Lindsay Allen were traded to the Connecticut Sun in exchange for Rebecca Allen.

On 3 April 2026, she was drafted 19th overall by the Toronto Tempo in the 2026 WNBA expansion draft.

On 4 June 2026, Milić was waived by the Tempo.

== WNBA career statistics ==
Legend
GP	Games played	GS	Games started	MPG	Minutes per game	RPG	Rebounds per game
APG	Assists per game	SPG	Steals per game	BPG	Blocks per game	PPG	Points per game
TO	Turnovers per game	FG%	Field-goal percentage	3P%	3-point field-goal percentage	FT%	Free-throw percentage
**Bold**	Career best	°	League leader

=== Regular season ===
Year	Team	GP	GS	MPG	FG%	3P%	FT%	RPG	APG	SPG	BPG	TO	PPG
2022	Minnesota	31	**4**	11.7	**.548**	.273	.738	**3.0**	0.7	**0.3**	**0.3**	**1.4**	**6.0**
2023	Minnesota	**39**	3	**12.7**	.464	**.364**	**.804**	2.4	**0.8**	0.1	0.1	**1.1**	5.9
Career	2 years, 1 team	70	7	12.3	.498	.318	.776	2.7	0.8	0.2	0.2	1.2	5.9

=== Playoffs ===
Year	Team	GP	GS	MPG	FG%	3P%	FT%	RPG	APG	SPG	BPG	TO	PPG
2023	Minnesota	3	0	7.3	.400	.000	1.000	1.3	0.7	0.0	0.0	0.7	2.0
Career	1 year, 1 team	3	0	7.3	.400	.000	1.000	1.3	0.7	0.0	0.0	0.7	2.0

== See also ==
- List of Serbian WNBA players
