= Arica Carter =

American basketball player (born 1996)

No. 23 – Panathinaikos
- Position: Shooting guard
- League: Greek League

Personal information
- Born: 19 July 1996 (age 30) Los Angeles, California
- Listed height: 5 ft 9 in (1.75 m)
- Listed weight: 143 lb (65 kg)

Career information
- High school: Long Beach Poly (Long Beach, California)
- College: Louisville (2014–2019)
- WNBA draft: 2019: 3rd round, 32nd overall pick
- Drafted by: Phoenix Mercury
- Playing career: 2019–present

Career history
- 2019: Phoenix Mercury
- 2019–2020: Nissan CB Al-Qázeres Extremadura
- 2020–2022: Movistar Estudiantes
- 2022: Astros de Jalisco
- 2022–2023: Panathinaikos
- 2023–2024: Hozono Global Jairis
- 2024–2025: Avenida
- 2025–2026: Uni Girona
- 2026–present: Panathinaikos

Career highlights
- LNBPF Finals MVP (2022); Spanish league best forward of year (2021-22)
- Stats at WNBA.com
- Stats at Basketball Reference

Arica Derris Carter (born July 19, 1996) is an American professional women's basketball who plays for the Greek women's basketball team Panathinaikos of the Greek Women's Basketball League and, previously, was in Perfumerias Avenidas before she won the championship in Mexico after stints with teams in the Spanish Liga Femenina de Baloncesto and Phoenix Mercury of the United States's Women's National Basketball Association (WNBA).

== Early life ==
Carter was born in Los Angeles, California, to parents Derrick Moses and Fern Carter and has six sisters and one brother. She played basketball at Long Beach Poly and was the first player from that school to be drafted and/or play in the WNBA. She later described her mother and sister as role models because "they are three strong women who keep pushing through no matter what the circumstances are".

Carter was a key member of the Long Beach Poly girls basketball team and won tournament MVP by, among the other tournament success, recording 12 points and eight steals in the final of the 2012 Inglewood City of Champions Elite Division. This was followed up with being chosen as Dream Team Player of the Year in 2013, averaging over 11 points per game, as Long Beach Poly won the California Interscholastic Federation (CIF) Division 1 championship in a 46–28 win over Berkley including 11 points from Carter. She averaged 10.5 points, 5.1 steals and 4.3 rebounds in her final 2014 season to win her second CIF championship with the Long Beach Jackrabbits; this time finishing champions in the Open Division with Carter scoring five in the 70–52 victory over Salesian.

Long Beach Poly's coach Carl Buggs said of Carter that ""She has a complete game, She has the ability to score, to score in crunch time, to make an assist, and she plays great defense" and that she chose to attend Louisville after high school because she saw that the players there practised hard - even when the coach was not watching them; he added that "it made me happy to be reminded that there are still players like that. She really cares about winning and about the game."

== College career ==
Carter, known as "AC", played four years, including three as a starter, at Louisville for the Cardinals while studying for a degree in psychology. She did not start in her freshman year, but played in 34 games and had a season that she later described as "a little rough" shooting zero for 15 from three point range. Her coach said that in that season she "couldn't hit the broad side of a barn." She commented that her response to the first season was to spend more time practicing shooting in the gym and that resulted in shooting percentages of nearly 40 percent at 3-point range and 30 minutes per game in later years. Carter did not play in the 2016–17 season due to a hernia, and took a medical redshirt that year, allowing her to be eligible for both the 2017–18 and 2018–19 seasons. During this season, Carter and the Cardinals would win the ACC Tournament. Carter also participated in three NCAA Tournaments during her time at Louisville.

In her college career she was known for her team leadership, mentoring of fellow players (including star guard Asia Durr) and quiet, unflashy but effective scoring and point-management in her role as point guard. Her coach Jeff Walz said that Carter was "just a heady, smart basketball player. AC, she just grinds it out"

=== Louisville statistics ===
Legend
GP	Games played	GS	Games started	MPG	Minutes per game
FG%	Field goal percentage	3P%	3-point field goal percentage	FT%	Free throw percentage
RPG	Rebounds per game	APG	Assists per game	SPG	Steals per game
BPG	Blocks per game	PPG	Points per game	**Bold**	Career high

Year	Team	GP	Points	FG%	3P%	FT%	RPG	APG	SPG	BPG	PPG
2014-15	Louisville	34	83	33.3%	0.0%	58.6%	1.8	1.5	0.9	0.2	2.4
2015-16	Louisville	34	138	39.7%	**41.0%**	66.7%	2.3	2.6	1.2	0.3	4.1
2016-17	Louisville	Medical redshirt year									
2017-18	Louisville	**38**	287	**44.4%**	38.6%	**78.6%**	2.9	**4.0**	**1.4**	0.2	7.6
2018-19	Louisville	34	**290**	38.3%	37.5%	73.5%	**3.1**	2.9	1.0	**0.5**	**8.5**
Career		140	798	39.9%	36.7%	69.5%	2.5	2.8	1.1	0.3	5.7

== Career ==
=== WNBA ===
Carter was selected as the thirty second overall pick of the 2019 WNBA draft by the Phoenix Mercury. After making the final roster with the Mercury, Carter would play under head coach Sandy Brondello and alongside the likes of Brittney Griner, DeWanna Bonner and Diana Taurasi. Carter played in the Mercury's first two games, totaling eight minutes of play. Carter was then waived to make room for Leilani Mitchell on June 1, 2019. Carter would be picked back up by the Mercury in August on a seven-day contract but left to make way for the return of Diana Taurasi.

==== WNBA statistics ====
Year	Team	GP	GS	MPG	FG%	3P%	FT%	RPG	APG	SPG	BPG	TO	PPG
2019	Phoenix	6	0	4.0	.200	.000	–	0.0	0.2	0.2	0.0	0.3	0.3

=== Spanish league ===
After a year's absence Carter joined Nissan CB Al-Qázeres Extremadura in the Spanish Liga Femenina de Baloncesto for the 2019–20 season and moved to Moviestar Estudiantes in the same league for the 2020–21 and 2021–22 season. In her second season at Estudiantes, they qualified for the 2021–22 EuroCup but were eliminated in play-off round 1 to Flammes Carolo Basket of Belgium by only three points in a two-leg match. Carter was voted best forward of the 2021–22 season of the Endesa Women's League and that year posted her career high 26 points and 8 assists in separate matches.

==== Mexican league ====
At the conclusion of the 2021–22 season in Spain, Carter switched to Mexican club Astros de Jalisco in the first season of the Liga Nacional de Baloncesto Profesional Femenil (LNBPF) where she was chosen as MVP of the grand final series for her contribution in winning the Mexican championship for the Astros. They were losing the final series 2-3 when they travelled to the home court of opponents Adelitas of Chihuahua but won the final two games to clinch the championship. Astros were 20 points behind the second last match but Carter posted 31 points and six assists to square the series with a 73–67 victory. Carter took 23 points and 7 assists in her 37 minutes on the court in the final championship match to win the title by 69 points to 64.

==== Spanish and Mexican statistics ====
Competition	Club	G	Min	Pts	2FGP	3FGP	FT	RO	RD	RT	AS	PF	BS	ST	TO	RNK
2019-20 Liga Femenina Endesa	Nissan CB Al-Qázeres Extremadura	22	614	203	34-108	37-106	24-36	11	52	63	35			24	48	95
2020-21 Liga Femenina Endesa	Movistar Estudiantes	33	904	400	93-202	52-160	58-65	13	79	92	68			44	48	343
2021–22 Eurocup	Movistar Estudiantes	6	161	89	25-41	9-32	12-13	4	25	29	21	11	1	4	8	85
2021-22 Liga Femenina Endesa	Movistar Estudiantes	25	781	346	77-177	49-134	45-61	16	64	80	77	55	4	31	54	306
2022 Liga Nacional de Baloncesto Profesional Femenil (LNBPF)	Astros de Jalisco	24	697	353	78-158	50-133	47-61	17	60	77	85	35	1	33	46	296

=== Greek League ===
On June 29, 2022, she was announced by the Greek club Panathinaikos.

== Club honors ==
=== Panathinaikos ===
- 1× Greek Cup Winner: 2023
