= Martina Crippa =

Italian basketball player

No. 14 – Gesam Gas Lucca
- Position: Point guard
- League: LegA

Personal information
- Born: 31 March 1989 (age 37) Sesto San Giovanni, Italy
- Listed height: 5 ft 10 in (1.78 m)

Martina Crippa (born 31 March 1989) is an Italian basketball player for Gesam Gas Lucca and the Italian national team.

She participated at the EuroBasket Women 2017.
