= Holly Winterburn =

British basketball player (born 2000)

- Winterburn Beşiktaş #77

No. 77 – Galatasaray
- Position: Shooting guard
- League: Turkish Super League; EuroLeague Women; WNBA

Personal information
- Born: October 1, 2000 (age 26) Northampton, England
- Listed height: 5 ft 11 in (1.80 m)

Career information
- High school: Quinton House School; Charnwood College
- College: Oregon (2019–2020); Loughborough (2021); East London (2022–2023)
- Playing career: 2015–present

Career history
- 2015–2019: Leicester Riders
- 2019–2020: University of Oregon
- 2020–2021: Leicester Riders
- 2021–2024: London Lions
- 2024–2025: Beşiktaş JK
- 2025–2026: Athinaikos
- 2026: Portland Fire
- 2026–present: Galatasaray

Career highlights
- FIBA EuroCup Women Champion (2024); FIBA EuroCup Women Finalist (2026); Greek Women's Basketball League Champion (2026); Greek Women's Basketball League Play-off Champion (2026); Greek Women's Basketball Cup Champion (2026); 5× WBBL Betty Codona Trophy champion (2018, 2019, 2022, 2023, 2024); 2× WBBL Cup winner (2022, 2023); 3x WBBL League Champion (2022, 2023, 2024); 3x WBBL Play-off Champion (2022, 2023, 2024); 3x WBBL Young Player of the year (2018, 2019, 2021)
- Stats at Basketball Reference

Holly Winterburn (born October 1, 2000) is a British professional basketball player who is currently signed to the Portland Fire in the WNBA. She also plays for the Great Britain women's national basketball team.

== Professional career ==
Starting her career with Leicester Riders in the UK's WBBL, Winterburn won two WBBL Trophies before switching to London Lions in 2021.

There, she was a three-time WBBL league, Trophy and playoff champion (2022-24) while in April 2024, Winterburn became a EuroCup Women's champion, as London Lions became the first British team ever to win a European basketball trophy when they beat Beşiktaş JK (women's basketball) to lift the FIBA EuroCup Women title.

She won a Greek A1 League championship, and playoff and Cup titles with Athinaikos Qualco in 2026 while also helping the team to reach the EuroCup Women final.

On November 17, 2026, she signed a contract with the Turkish giant Galatasaray.

== WNBA ==
On 5 February 2025, the Atlanta Dream announced that they had signed Winterburn to a training camp contract under the rookie scale for the upcoming WNBA season. However, on 7 April, it was announced that she would miss the 2025 season due to an injury.

On 7 May 2026, the Atlanta Dream announced that they had signed Winterburn to the roster for the WNBA season. But on 9 May, the Atlanta Dream announced that she had been waived, just hours before their opening game.

On 13 May 2026, the Portland Fire announced they had signed her to a Development Contract before moving her up to a Standard Contract the following week

== International career ==
Making her senior international debut in 2023, she had a first major tournament appearance at EuroBasket Women 2023.

Winterburn was part of the Great Britain team that qualified for EuroBasket Women 2025 by beating Denmark 75-58, leading all players with 8.4 assists alongside 13.6 points and 5.4 rebounds per game in the qualification round. At EuroBasket 2025, she averaged 13 points and 6.7 assists.

As of summer 2026, she had averaged 12.9 points, 4.9 rebounds, and 6.6 assists per game for GB.

Previously, she featured for her country in FIBA European Championships at Under-16, Under-18 and Under-20 levels.

== Early career ==
Winterburn came through the development programme of Charnwood College and its affiliate club, Leicester Riders.

She spent a single season in the NCAA with the Oregon Ducks women's basketball and appeared in 28 games while averaging 3.4 points and 1.5 rebounds before transferring back to the UK to play collegiately at Loughborough University.

== Career statistics ==
Legend
| GP | Games played | GS | Games started | MPG | Minutes per game | RPG | Rebounds per game |
| APG | Assists per game | SPG | Steals per game | BPG | Blocks per game | PPG | Points per game |
| TO | Turnovers per game | FG% | Field-goal percentage | 3P% | 3-point field-goal percentage | FT% | Free-throw percentage |
| **Bold** | Career best | ° | League leader |

=== Europe ===
==== Season by season ====
| Season | Team | League | GP | GS | MPG | FG% | 3P% | FT% | RPG | APG | SPG | BPG | PPG |
|---|---|---|---|---|---|---|---|---|---|---|---|---|---|
| 2020-21 | Leicester Riders | WBBL | | | 31.8 | | | | **7** | **6.2** | 2.1 | | **14.9** |
| 2021-22 | London Lions | WBBL | 21 | | | | | | 4.2 | 5.4 | 1.5 | | 12.6 |
| 2022-23 | London Lions | EuroCup | 8 | | | | | | 6.1 | 6 | | | 14.4 |
| 2023-24 | London Lions | WBBL | 18 | | | | | | 3.8 | 4.5 | 1.2 | | 13 |
| 2023-24 | London Lions | EuroCup | 14 | | | | | | 4.2 | 5.1 | | | 12.6 |
| 2024-25 | Beşiktaş JK | Turkiye | | | **39.5** | | | | 3.0 | 5.5 | 1.5 | | 11.0 |
| 2024-25 | Beşiktaş JK | EuroCup | 12 | | | | | | 3.7 | 4.1 | | | 11.9 |
| 2025-26 | Athinaikos | Greek A1 | 11 | | 27.8 | 66.7 | | 81.8 | 3.4 | 4.5 | | | 6.1 |
| 2025-26 | Athinaikos | EuroCup | 16 | | | | | | 3.3 | 4.6 | | | 8.6 |

=== WNBA ===
==== Regular season ====
WNBA regular season statistics
| Year | Team | GP | GS | MPG | FG% | 3P% | FT% | RPG | APG | SPG | BPG | TO | PPG |
|---|---|---|---|---|---|---|---|---|---|---|---|---|---|
| 2026 | | | | | | | | | | | | | |
| **Career** | — | — | — | — | — | — | — | — | — | — | — | — | — |
