= Ieva Pulvere =

Latvian basketball player

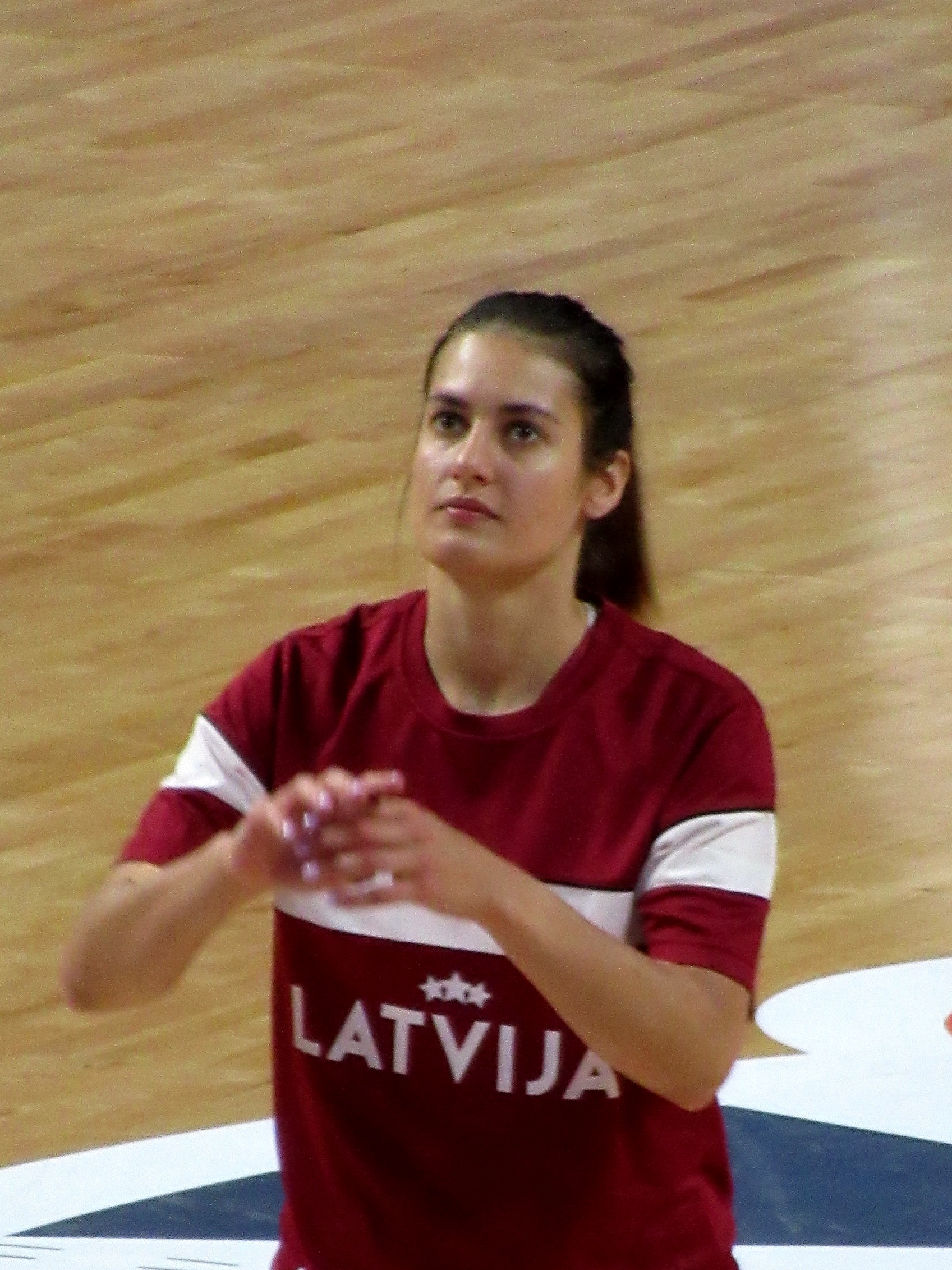

No. 15 – TTT Riga
- Position: Shooting guard

Personal information
- Born: 22 July 1990 (age 36) Cēsis, Latvian SSR, Soviet Union
- Listed height: 5 ft 8 in (1.73 m)
- Listed weight: 152 lb (69 kg)

Career information
- WNBA draft: 2012: undrafted

Career history
- 2005–2010: SK Cēsis
- 2010–2011: Latvijas Universitate
- 2011–2013: TTT Riga
- 2013–2014: VICI Vilnius
- 2014–2022: TTT Riga
- 2022–2023: Galatasaray
- 2023–: TTT Riga

Ieva Pulvere (née Krastiņa; born 22 July 1990) is a Latvian basketball player for TTT Riga and Latvia women's national basketball team.

== Club career ==
=== Galatasaray ===
On 12 August 2022, she signed with Galatasaray of the Turkish Women's Basketball Super League (TKBL).

As of July 2023, his contract has expired. Galatasaray club said goodbye to the player on July 6, 2023, by publishing a thank you message.

== National team career ==
Krastiņa is two-time bronze medallist of the FIBA Europe Under-20 Championship. She is 2009 Latvian champion.
