= 2026–27 Fenerbahçe S.K. (women's basketball) season =

73rd season

Fenerbahçe Tarfin
2026–27 season
- President: Aziz Yıldırım
- Head coach: Ahmet Çakı
- Arena: Metro Enerji Sports Hall; Ülker Sports and Event Hall (EuroLeague matches)
- Basketball Super League: Regular season
- EuroLeague Women: Regular season
- Presidential Cup: Pre-season
- FIBA Europe SuperCup: Winners
Home	Away	Third

The 2026–27 season will be Fenerbahçe's 73rd season in the existence of the club. The team will play in the Basketball Super League and in the EuroLeague Women.

== Club ==
=== Board of directors ===
Position	Staff
Chairman	(Turkey) Aziz Yıldırım
Deputy Chairman	(Turkey) Barış Göktürk
General Secretary	(Turkey) Mahmut Uslu
Board Member	(Turkey) Nihat Özbağı
Board Member	(Turkey) Mustafa Çağlar
Board Member	(Turkey) Ahmet Önder Fırat
Board Member	(Turkey) Cihan Kamer
Board Member	(Turkey) Fatih Öztürk
Board Member	(Turkey) Batuhan Özdemir
Board Member	(Turkey) Tanju Kaya
Board Member	(Turkey) Ahmet Murat İman
Board Member	(Turkey) Özgür Peker
Board Member	(Turkey) Yusuf Buğra Tanık
Board Member	(Turkey) Mehmet Aydın
Board Member	(Turkey) Mehmet Selim Kosif
Board Member	(Turkey) Fatih Aslan
Board Member	(Turkey) Volkan Akan
Board Member	(Turkey) Mustafa Aydın Acun
Board Member	(Turkey) Barış Karagöz
Board Member	(Turkey) Yasemin Babayiğit
Board Member	(Turkey) Savaş Adalet
Board Member	(Turkey) Demre İşçen
Board Member	(Turkey) Feridun Geçgel
Board Member	(Turkey) Mehmet İman
Board Member	(Turkey) İsmail Balcı
Board Member	(Turkey) Ömer Onan
Board Member	(Turkey) Abdullah Çiftçi

Last updated: 10 June 2026
Source: Fenerbahce.org

=== Staff ===
Position	Staff
General Manager	(Turkey) Arzu Özyiğit
Team Manager	(Turkey) Derin Yener
Head Coach	(Turkey) Ahmet Çakı
Youth Development Coordinator	(Turkey) Fatih Emre Gezer
Assistant Coach	(Turkey) Fatih Emre Gezer
Assistant Coach	(Turkey) Yağız Sertoğlu
Assistant Coach	(Turkey) Semih Akdemir
Strength and Conditioning Coach	(Turkey) Enis Baş
Administrative Manager	(Turkey) Oğulcan Türkmen
Communications and Media Officer	(Turkey) Gökhan Deniz
Digital Media Manager	(Turkey) Hazal Karabil
Ticketing Manager	(Turkey) Evren Gençoğlu
Ticketing Officer	(Turkey) Kaan Can Değerli
Marketing Specialist	(Turkey) Arda Doğtaş
Physiotherapist	(Turkey) Ertan Yorgun
Physiotherapist	(Turkey) Efe Özgümüş
Masseur	(Turkey) Berkay Taş
Equipment Manager	(Turkey) Latifşah Sarıca

Last updated: 13 November 2026
Source: Fenerbahce.org

== Players ==
=== Squad information ===
Fenerbahçe Tarfin roster
Players
Coaches

Pos.	No.	Nat.	Name	Ht.	Wt.	Age
PG	1	(Serbia) (United States)	Anderson, Yvonne	1.75 m (5 ft 9 in)		36 – 8 March 1990
SF	2	(Lithuania)	Juškaitė, Laura	1.87 m (6 ft 2 in)	85 kg (187 lb)	29 – 22 September 1997
G/F	3	(Turkey)	Kurtulmuş, Manolya	1.75 m (5 ft 9 in)		28 – 1 January 1998
PG	4	(Turkey)	Çakır, Olcay	1.80 m (5 ft 11 in)	60 kg (132 lb)	33 – 13 July 1993
SF	9	(Turkey)	Kaplan, Sıla	1.84 m (6 ft 0 in)		21 – 19 November 2004
PG	10	(Turkey)	Onar, Alperi (C)	1.70 m (5 ft 7 in)	57 kg (126 lb)	30 – 2 January 1996
PF	11	(Belgium)	Meesseman, Emma	1.93 m (6 ft 4 in)	87 kg (192 lb)	33 – 13 May 1993
PF	12	(Turkey)	Gül, Zeynep Şevval	1.93 m (6 ft 4 in)		25 – 1 January 2001
F	13	(Turkey)	Vural, Tuana	1.77 m (5 ft 10 in)		19 – 3 April 2007
C	15	(Germany)	Geiselsöder, Luisa	1.93 m (6 ft 4 in)	93 kg (205 lb)	26 – 10 February 2000
PG	22	(Belgium)	Allemand, Julie	1.73 m (5 ft 8 in)	67 kg (148 lb)	30 – 7 July 1996
C	24	(Turkey) (United States)	Hollingsworth, Quanitra	1.98 m (6 ft 6 in)	91 kg (201 lb)	39 – 15 November 1987
F	25	(Turkey)	Baş, Selen	1.80 m (5 ft 11 in)		22 – 1 February 2004
SG	32	(France)	Pouye, Tima	1.75 m (5 ft 9 in)		27 – 7 April 1999
F	33	(France)	Angloma, Nell	1.85 m (6 ft 1 in)		20 – 12 June 2006
C	51	(United States)	Betts, Lauren	2.01 m (6 ft 7 in)	105 kg (231 lb)	23 – 15 October 2003
G	71	(France)	Lacan, Leïla	1.80 m (5 ft 11 in)		22 – 2 June 2004
C		(France) (Martinique)	Rupert, Iliana (injured)	1.94 m (6 ft 4 in)	86 kg (190 lb)	25 – 12 July 2001

Head coach

- (Turkey) Ahmet Çakı

Assistant coach(es)

- (Turkey) Fatih Emre Gezer
- (Turkey) Yağız Sertoğlu
- (Turkey) Semih Akdemir

Team manager

- (Turkey) Arzu Özyiğit

Legend

- (C) Team captain
- (DC) Dual citizenship
- Injured

- Roster
Updated: 10 September 2026

=== Depth chart ===
Pos.	Starting 5	Bench 1	Bench 2	Bench 3	Inactive
C	Lauren Betts	Luisa Geiselsöder	Quanitra Hollingsworth		Iliana Rupert
PF	Emma Meesseman	Laura Juškaitė	Zeynep Şevval Gül
SF	Nell Angloma	Sıla Kaplan	Tuana Vural	Selen Baş
SG	Leïla Lacan	Tima Pouye	Manolya Kurtulmuş
PG	Julie Allemand	Yvonne Anderson	Alperi Onar	Olcay Çakır

=== Transactions ===
==== In ====
No.	Pos.	Nat.	Name	Age	Moving from		Ends	Date	Source
12	PF	(Turkey)	Zeynep Şevval Gül	25	Galatasaray Çağdaş Faktoring	(Turkey)	June 2027	10 September 2026	
3	G/F	(Turkey)	Manolya Kurtulmuş	28	ÇBK Mersin	(Turkey)	June 2027	10 September 2026	
32	SG	(France)	Tima Pouye	27	Toronto Tempo	(Canada)	June 2027	10 September 2026	
15	C	(Germany)	Luisa Geiselsöder	26	Portland Fire	(United States)	June 2027	10 September 2026	
33	F	(France)	Nell Angloma	20	Connecticut Sun	(United States)	June 2028	10 September 2026	
51	C	(United States)	Lauren Betts	22	Washington Mystics	(United States)	June 2027	10 September 2026	
2	SF	(Lithuania)	Laura Juškaitė	28	Toronto Tempo	(Canada)	June 2027	10 September 2026	
71	G	(France)	Leïla Lacan	22	Connecticut Sun	(United States)		10 September 2026	
1	PG	(United States) (Serbia)	Yvonne Anderson	36	Valencia Basket	(Spain)	June 2027	19 September 2026	
24	C	(United States) (Turkey)	Quanitra Hollingsworth	37	Free agent		Short term	24 September 2026	

==== Out ====
No.	Pos.	Nat.	Name	Age	Moving to		Date	Source
2	G	(Turkey)	Sevgi Uzun	28	Galatasaray Çağdaş Faktoring	(Turkey)	18 May 2026	
15	PF	(Turkey)	Tilbe Şenyürek	31	Spar Girona	(Spain)	12 June 2026	
5	F	(United States) (France)	Gabby Williams	29	Golden State Valkyries	(United States)	1 July 2026	
14	C	(United States) (Turkey)	Teaira McCowan	29	Free agent		1 July 2026	
21	SG	(United States)	Kayla McBride	34	Minnesota Lynx	(United States)	1 July 2026	
30	PF	(United States)	Breanna Stewart	31	New York Liberty	(United States)	1 July 2026	
31	C	(Serbia)	Nikolina Milić	32	Free agent		1 July 2026	
33	F	(Turkey)	Meltem Avcı	29	Free agent		1 July 2026	
35	C	(The Bahamas) (Bosnia and Herzegovina)	Jonquel Jones	32	New York Liberty	(United States)	1 July 2026	

==== Contract renewals ====
No.	Pos.	Nat.	Name	Age	Cont.	Date	Source
10	PG	(Turkey)	Alperi Onar	30	1-year	9 September 2026	
4	PG	(Turkey)	Olcay Çakır	33	1-year	9 September 2026	
22	PG	(Belgium)	Julie Allemand	30	1-year	9 September 2026	
11	PF	(Belgium)	Emma Meesseman	33	1-year	21 September 2026	

== Pre-season and friendlies ==
=== Friendly matches ===
vs.

== Overview ==
Competition	First match	Last match	Starting round	Final position	Record							
Competition	First match	Last match	Starting round	Final position	Pld	W	D	L	PF	PA	PD	Win %
Basketball Super League	26 September 2026	TBD	Round 1		6	5	0	1	515	415	+100	83.33
EuroLeague Women	14 October 2026	TBD	Round 1		4	3	0	1	341	264	+77	75.00
Presidential Cup	9 December 2026		Final		0	0	0	0	0	0	+0	—
FIBA Europe SuperCup	7 October 2026		Final	Winners	1	1	0	0	79	71	+8	100.00
Total					11	9	0	2	935	750	+185	81.82

Last updated: 7 November 2026
Source: Competitions

== Competitions ==
=== Presidential Cup ===
9 December 2026	Fenerbahçe	vs.	Galatasaray	Gaziantep
19:00 TRT (UTC+3)
		Boxscore		Arena: Kamil Ocak Sport Hall

=== FIBA Europe SuperCup ===
7 October 2026	ÇBK Mersin (Turkish Basketball Federation)	71–79	(Turkish Basketball Federation) Fenerbahçe	Mersin, Turkey
19:30 TRT (UTC+3)	Scoring by quarter: 21–19, 11–19, 16–21, 23–20
	Pts: Leite 17; Rebs: Iagupova, Diaby 8 Asts: Leite 5 PIR: Leite 18	Boxscore	Pts: Çakır 16; Rebs: Meesseman 8 Asts: Meesseman 7 PIR: Meesseman 26	Arena: Servet Tazegül Arena; Attendance: 8,000; Referees: Viola Györgyi, Nataša Dragojević, Milita Stalaucinskaitė

=== Basketball Super League ===
==== League table ====
Pos	Team	Pld	W	L	PF	PA	PD	Pts	Qualification
1	Galatasaray Çağdaş Faktoring	6	6	0	487	409	+78	12	Advance to playoffs
2	Botaş	7	5	2	515	474	+41	12	Advance to playoffs
3	Nesibe Aydın	7	5	2	526	511	+15	12	Advance to playoffs
4	Fenerbahçe Tarfin	6	5	1	515	415	+100	11	Advance to playoffs
5	Beşiktaş Boa	6	4	2	436	376	+60	10	Advance to playoffs
6	Çimsa ÇBK Mersin	6	3	3	437	421	+16	9	Advance to playoffs
7	Ormanspor	7	2	5	492	543	−51	9	Advance to playoffs
8	Melikgazi Basketbol	7	2	5	448	499	−51	9	Advance to playoffs
9	Emlak Konut	6	2	4	431	441	−10	8	
10	İstanbul Gençlik SK	6	1	5	400	453	−53	7	
11	Turgutlu Belediyespor	6	0	6	348	493	−145	6	Relegation to TKBL

Updated to match(es) played on 7 November 2026. Source: KBSL
Rules for classification: 1) Points; 2) Points difference; 3) Points scored.

==== Results summary ====
Overall						Home					Away				
Pld	W	L	PF	PA	PD	W	L	PF	PA	PD	W	L	PF	PA	PD
6	5	1	515	415	+100	3	0	270	205	+65	2	1	245	210	+35

Last updated: 7 November 2026.
Source: TBF.org.tr

==== Results by round ====
Round	1	2	3	4	5	6	7	8	9	10	11	12	13	14	15	16	17	18	19	20	21	22
Ground	H	A	H	A	H	B	A	H	A	H	A	A	H	A	H	A	B	H	A	H	A	H
Result	W	W	W	L	W	B	W															
Position	2	1	1	1	1	5	4															

Updated to match(es) played on 7 November 2026. Source: TBF.org.tr
A = Away; H = Home; B = Bye; W = Win; L = Loss

==== Matches ====
Note: All times are TRT (UTC+3) as listed by Turkish Basketball Federation.

26 September 2026 1	Fenerbahçe	87–78	Emlak Konut	Istanbul
14:00	Scoring by quarter: 30–25, 28–13, 16–20, 13–20
	Pts: Çakır 13; Rebs: Hollingsworth 4 Asts: Pouye 3 PIR: Pouye 15	Boxscore	Pts: Uzunoğlu 14; Rebs: Uzunoğlu 8 Asts: Allen 5 PIR: Uzunoğlu 19	Arena: Metro Enerji Sports Hall; Attendance: 476; Referees: Ozan Gönen, Yarkın Keskin, Furkan Söylemezoğlu

3 October 2026 2	Nesibe Aydın	69–88	Fenerbahçe	Ankara
16:00	Scoring by quarter: 8–25, 24–31, 14–19, 23–13
	Pts: Ivanova, Begić 13; Rebs: Begić 7 Asts: Begić 6 PIR: Nelson 17	Boxscore	Pts: Geiselsöder 18; Rebs: Meesseman 6 Asts: Çakır 9 PIR: Meesseman 23	Arena: TOBB Sport Hall; Attendance: 1,000; Referees: Ahmet Taner İbin, Anıl Veziroğlu, Ömer Sarı

10 October 2026 3	Fenerbahçe	99–70	Melikgazi Basketbol	Istanbul
14:00	Scoring by quarter: 20–23, 31–13, 31–20, 17–14
	Pts: Geiselsöder 16; Rebs: Hollingsworth 8 Asts: Allemand 6 PIR: Allemand 22	Boxscore	Pts: Jones 25; Rebs: Kaur 7 Asts: Littleton 7 PIR: Jones 22	Arena: Metro Enerji Sports Hall; Attendance: 350; Referees: Fatih Güler, Hasan Kamil Takınyalıoğlu, Çağatay Taşkın

17 October 2026 4	Beşiktaş	81–69	Fenerbahçe	Istanbul
14:00	Scoring by quarter: 21–14, 22–26, 22–10, 16–19
	Pts: Badiane 17; Rebs: Alleyne 8 Asts: Simms 5 PIR: Alleyne 18	Boxscore	Pts: Meesseman 16; Rebs: Meesseman 8 Asts: Meesseman, Lacan 4 PIR: Meesseman 26	Arena: Akatlar Arena; Attendance: 222; Referees: Orkun Yurttaş, Hakan Gerey, Gündoğan Ali Balaban

24 October 2026 5	Fenerbahçe	84–57	Turgutlu Belediyespor	Istanbul
14:00	Scoring by quarter: 17–16, 27–14, 20–13, 20–14
	Pts: Betts 17; Rebs: Geiselsöder 8 Asts: Çakır 7 PIR: Betts 22	Boxscore	Pts: Cowling 20; Rebs: Kovačević 9 Asts: Tongar, Cowling 4 PIR: Cowling 14	Arena: Metro Enerji Sports Hall; Attendance: 150; Referees: Mesut Öztürk, Nagehan Şeyda Kurden Aktaş, Şevket Kutluhan Kanburoğlu

6	Bye

7 November 2026 7	Botaş	60–88	Fenerbahçe	Ankara
14:00	Scoring by quarter: 15–17, 17–17, 16–32, 12–22
	Pts: Nared 23; Rebs: Akhator 13; Asts: Yeniçulha 4 PIR: Akhator 23	Boxscore	Pts: Meesseman 16; Rebs: Hollingsworth, Juškaitė 6 Asts: Meesseman 6 PIR: Meesseman, Lacan 19	Arena: Ankara Arena; Attendance: 800; Referees: Yiğit Emre Şimşek, Özkan Talo, Berkin Yücer

21 November 2026 8	Fenerbahçe	vs.	OGM Ormanspor	Istanbul
14:00
		Boxscore		Arena: Metro Enerji Sports Hall

28 November 2026 9	Galatasaray	vs.	Fenerbahçe	Istanbul
19:00
		Boxscore		Arena: Sinan Erdem Dome

5 December 2026 10	Fenerbahçe	vs.	İstanbul Gençlik	Istanbul
14:00
		Boxscore		Arena: Metro Enerji Sports Hall

12 December 2026 11	ÇBK Mersin	vs.	Fenerbahçe	Mersin
14:00
		Boxscore		Arena: Servet Tazegül Arena

12	Emlak Konut	vs.	Fenerbahçe	Istanbul
		Boxscore		Arena: Başakşehir Spor Kompleksi

13	Fenerbahçe	vs.	Nesibe Aydın	Istanbul
		Boxscore		Arena: Metro Enerji Sports Hall

14	Melikgazi Basketbol	vs.	Fenerbahçe	Kayseri
		Boxscore		Arena: Kadir Has Spor Salonu

15	Fenerbahçe	vs.	Beşiktaş	Istanbul
		Boxscore		Arena: Metro Enerji Sports Hall

16	Turgutlu Belediyespor	vs.	Fenerbahçe	Manisa
		Boxscore		Arena: Yıldırım Beyazıt Sports Hall

17	Bye

18	Fenerbahçe	vs.	Botaş	Istanbul
		Boxscore		Arena: Metro Enerji Sports Hall

19	OGM Ormanspor	vs.	Fenerbahçe	Ankara
		Boxscore		Arena: Sait Zarifoğlu Sports Hall

20	Fenerbahçe	vs.	Galatasaray	Istanbul
		Boxscore		Arena: Metro Enerji Sports Hall

21	İstanbul Gençlik	vs.	Fenerbahçe	Istanbul
		Boxscore		Arena: Ahmet Cömert Sport Hall

22	Fenerbahçe	vs.	ÇBK Mersin	Istanbul
		Boxscore		Arena: Metro Enerji Sports Hall

=== EuroLeague Women ===
==== First round ====
===== Group C =====
Pos	Team	Pld	W	L	PF	PA	PD	Pts	Qualification
1	(Turkish Basketball Federation) Fenerbahçe Tarfin (Q)	4	3	1	341	264	+77	7	Second round
2	(French Federation of Basketball) Flammes Carolo Basket (Q)	4	3	1	349	274	+75	7	Second round
3	(Spanish Basketball Federation) Valencia Basket	4	2	2	310	283	+27	6	Second round
4	(Romanian Basketball Federation) CS Rapid București	4	0	4	228	407	−179	4	EuroCup Women

Updated to match(es) played on 3 November 2026. Source: EuroLeague Women
Rules for classification: 1) Points; 2) Points difference; 3) Points scored.
(Q) Qualified for the phase indicated

===== Results summary =====
Overall						Home					Away				
Pld	W	L	PF	PA	PD	W	L	PF	PA	PD	W	L	PF	PA	PD
4	3	1	341	264	+77	1	1	152	144	+8	2	0	189	120	+69

Last updated: 3 November 2026.
Source: EuroLeague Women

===== Results by round =====
Round	1	2	3	4	5	6
Ground	A	A	H	H	H	A
Result	W	W	W	L		
Position	2	1	1	1		

Updated to match(es) played on 3 November 2026. Source: EuroLeague Women
A = Away; H = Home; W = Win; L = Loss

===== Matches =====
14 October 2026 1	Valencia Basket (Spanish Basketball Federation)	69–88	(Turkish Basketball Federation) Fenerbahçe	Valencia
20:00 CEST (UTC+2)	Scoring by quarter: 12–27, 18–23, 21–18, 18–20
	Pts: Takács-Kiss 12; Rebs: Flórez 5 Asts: Romero 4 PIR: Pueyo 13	Boxscore	Pts: Lacan 19; Rebs: Allemand, Betts 5 Asts: Meesseman, Allemand 5 PIR: Lacan 18	Arena: Roig Arena; Attendance: 3,069; Referees: Nataša Dragojević, Bogna Podkowińska, Laure Coanus

21 October 2026 2	CS Rapid București (Romanian Basketball Federation)	51–101	(Turkish Basketball Federation) Fenerbahçe	Bucharest
19:30 EEST (UTC+3)	Scoring by quarter: 13–21, 8–35, 13–21, 17–24
	Pts: Cuic 14; Rebs: Delić 6 Asts: Orban 4 PIR: Cuic 14	Boxscore	Pts: Betts 16; Rebs: Betts 12; Asts: Anderson 5 PIR: Betts 26	Arena: Polyvalent Hall; Attendance: 1,000; Referees: Esperanza Mendoza, Ewa Matuszewska, Romana Rea Car

28 October 2026 3	Fenerbahçe (Turkish Basketball Federation)	81–71	(French Federation of Basketball) Flammes Carolo Basket	Istanbul
20:00 TRT (UTC+3)	Scoring by quarter: 28–13, 18–13, 23–24, 12–21
	Pts: Pouye 14; Rebs: Betts 10; Asts: Meesseman, Lacan 7 PIR: Betts 18	Boxscore	Pts: Love 17; Rebs: Love 9 Asts: Franchelin 9 PIR: Love 17	Arena: Ülker Sports and Event Hall; Referees: Nataša Dragojević, Nemanja Vlahović, Suzana Vujicic

3 November 2026 4	Fenerbahçe (Turkish Basketball Federation)	71–73	(Spanish Basketball Federation) Valencia Basket	Istanbul
20:00 TRT (UTC+3)	Scoring by quarter: 22–23, 20–14, 20–20, 9–16
	Pts: Betts 16; Rebs: Betts 6 Asts: Meesseman 4 PIR: Betts 19	Boxscore	Pts: Peterson 21; Rebs: Carrera 11; Asts: Pueyo 3 PIR: Peterson 17	Arena: Ülker Sports and Event Hall; Referees: Milita Stalausinskaitė, Mikheil Vartanov, Stefan Stefanov

25 November 2026 5	Fenerbahçe (Turkish Basketball Federation)	vs.	(Romanian Basketball Federation) CS Rapid București	Istanbul
20:00 TRT (UTC+3)
		Boxscore		Arena: Ülker Sports and Event Hall

2 December 2026 6	Flammes Carolo Basket (French Federation of Basketball)	vs.	(Turkish Basketball Federation) Fenerbahçe	Charleville-Mézières
19:00 CET (UTC+1)
		Boxscore		Arena: Guinguette Arena
