= 2025–26 Fenerbahçe S.K. (women's basketball) season =

72nd season

Fenerbahçe Opet
2025–26 season
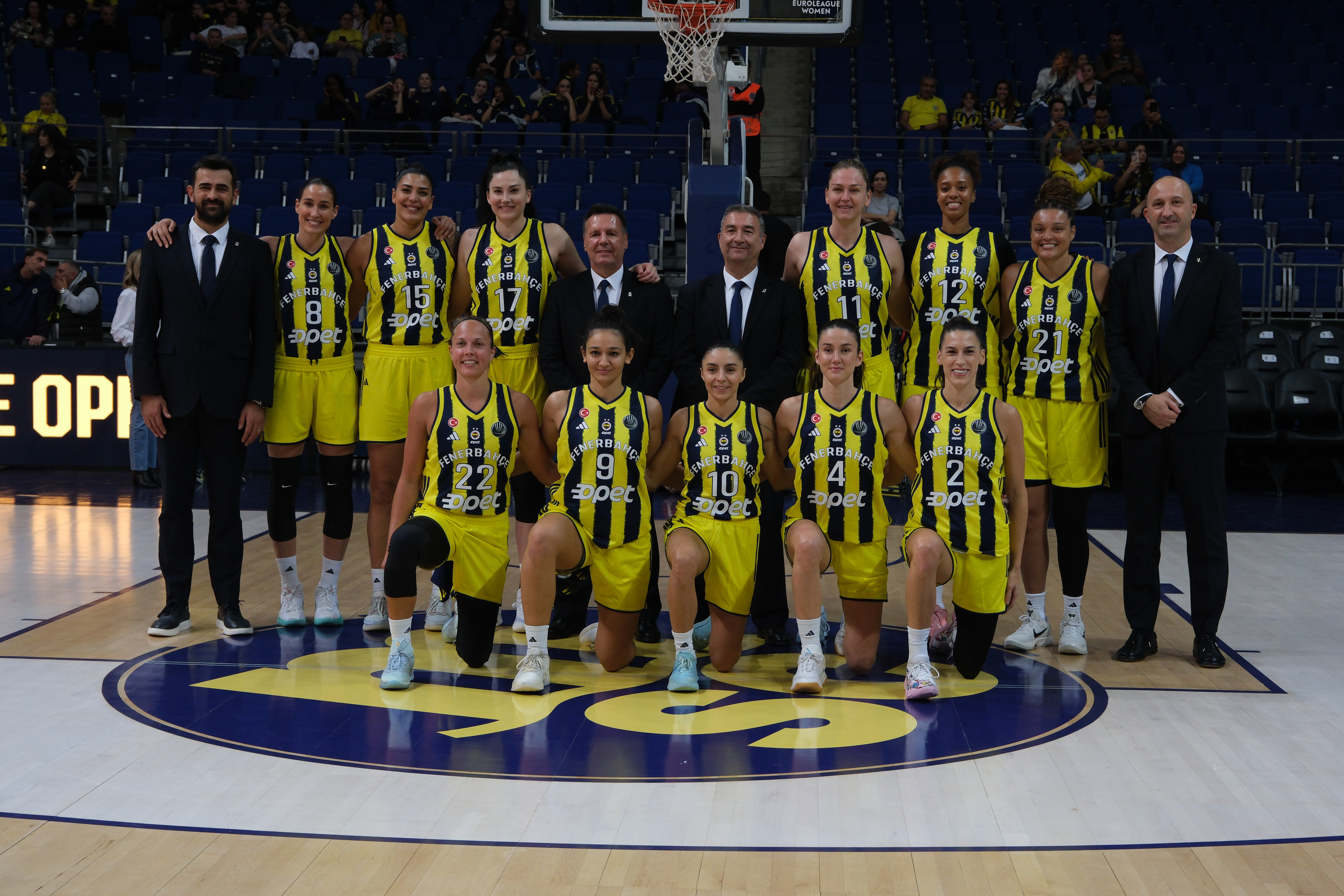
- President: Ali Koç (until 25 September); Sadettin Saran (from 25 September)
- Head coach: Miguel Méndez
- Arena: Metro Enerji Sports Hall; Ülker Sports and Event Hall (EuroLeague matches)
- Basketball Super League: 1st seed
- Playoffs: Winners
- EuroLeague Women: Winners
- Presidential Cup: Winners
- Turkish Basketball Cup: Winners

The 2025–26 season was Fenerbahçe's 72nd season in the existence of the club. The team played in the Basketball Super League and in the EuroLeague Women.

== Club ==
=== Board of directors ===
Position	Staff
Chairman	(Turkey) Sadettin Saran
Deputy Chairman	(Turkey) Murat Salar
General Secretary	(Turkey) Orhan Demirel
Board Member	(Turkey) Adem Köz
Board Member	(Turkey) Taner Sönmezer
Board Member	(Turkey) Ahmet Murat Emanetoğlu
Board Member	(Turkey) İlker Alkun
Board Member	(Turkey) Burçin Gözlüklü
Board Member	(Turkey) Ali Gürbüz
Board Member	(Turkey) Ertan Torunoğulları
Board Member	(Turkey) Ufuk Şansal
Board Member	(Turkey) Olcay Doğan
Board Member	(Turkey) Cem Ciritci
Board Member	(Turkey) Erdem Sezer
Board Member	(Turkey) Ozan Vural
Board Member	(Turkey) Ertuğrul Eren Ergen
Board Member	(Turkey) İlyas Yılmaz
Board Member	(Turkey) Orkan Orakçıoğlu
Board Member	(Turkey) Gürhan Taşkaya
Board Member	(Turkey) İlker Arslan
Board Member	(Turkey) Zeynep Yalım Uzun
Board Member	(Turkey) Serhan Yılmaz

Last updated: 25 September 2025
Source: Fenerbahce.org

=== Staff ===
Position	Staff
General Manager	(Turkey) Arzu Özyiğit
Administrative Manager	(Turkey) Derin Yener
Head Coach	(Spain) Miguel Méndez
Assistant Coach	(Spain) Nacho Martínez
Assistant Coach & Youth Development Coordinator	(Turkey) Fatih Emre Gezer
Assistant Coach	(Turkey) Semih Akdemir
Assistant Operations Support Specialist	(Turkey) Enis Bayrak
Assistant Operations Support Specialist	(Turkey) Oğulcan Türkmen
Communications and Media Officer	(Turkey) Gökhan Deniz
Ticketing Manager	(Turkey) Evren Gençoğlu
Ticketing Officer	(Turkey) Kaan Can Değerli
Strength and Conditioning Coach	(Turkey) Enis Baş
Doctor	(Turkey) Mehmet Yalçınozan
Physiotherapist	(Turkey) Ertan Yorgun
Physiotherapist	(Turkey) Efe Özgümüş
Masseur	(Turkey) İbrahim Koç
Equipment Manager	(Turkey) Latifşah Sarıca

Last updated: 20 October 2025
Source: Fenerbahce.org

== Players ==
=== Squad information ===
Fenerbahçe Opet roster
Players
Coaches

Pos.	No.	Nat.	Name	Ht.	Wt.	Age
G	2	(Turkey)	Uzun, Sevgi	1.75 m (5 ft 9 in)	64 kg (141 lb)	28 – 25 November 1997
PG	3	(Turkey)	Yılmaz, Ayşe	1.71 m (5 ft 7 in)		22 – 13 August 2003
G	4	(Turkey)	Çakır, Olcay	1.80 m (5 ft 11 in)	60 kg (132 lb)	32 – 13 July 1993
F	5	(United States) (France)	Williams, Gabby (DC)	1.80 m (5 ft 11 in)	78 kg (172 lb)	29 – 9 September 1996
PG	10	(Turkey)	Onar, Alperi (C)	1.70 m (5 ft 7 in)	57 kg (126 lb)	30 – 2 January 1996
F/C	11	(Belgium)	Meesseman, Emma	1.93 m (6 ft 4 in)	87 kg (192 lb)	32 – 13 May 1993
F/C	12	(France) (Martinique)	Rupert, Iliana	1.94 m (6 ft 4 in)	86 kg (190 lb)	24 – 12 July 2001
SG	13	(Turkey)	Vural, Tuana	1.77 m (5 ft 10 in)		19 – 3 April 2007
C	14	(United States) (Turkey)	McCowan, Teaira (DC)	2.01 m (6 ft 7 in)	108 kg (238 lb)	29 – 28 September 1996
PF	15	(Turkey)	Şenyürek, Tilbe	1.88 m (6 ft 2 in)	86 kg (190 lb)	30 – 26 April 1995
F	21	(United States)	McBride, Kayla	1.80 m (5 ft 11 in)	81 kg (179 lb)	33 – 25 June 1992
G	22	(Belgium)	Allemand, Julie	1.73 m (5 ft 8 in)	67 kg (148 lb)	29 – 7 July 1996
G/F	24	(Turkey)	Baş, Selen	1.80 m (5 ft 11 in)		22 – 1 February 2004
F	30	(United States)	Stewart, Breanna (E)	1.93 m (6 ft 4 in)	77 kg (170 lb)	31 – 27 August 1994
PF	31	(Serbia)	Milić, Nikolina	1.91 m (6 ft 3 in)	82 kg (181 lb)	32 – 12 April 1994
F	33	(Turkey)	Avcı, Meltem	1.88 m (6 ft 2 in)		29 – 30 January 1997
C	35	(The Bahamas) (Bosnia and Herzegovina)	Jones, Jonquel (injured) (DC)	1.98 m (6 ft 6 in)	98 kg (216 lb)	32 – 5 January 1994

Head coach

- (Spain) Miguel Méndez

Assistant coach(es)

- (Spain) Nacho Martínez
- (Turkey) Fatih Emre Gezer
- (Turkey) Semih Akdemir

Team manager

- (Turkey) Arzu Özyiğit

Legend

- (C) Team captain
- (DC) Dual citizenship
- (E) EuroLeague player
- Injured

- Roster
Updated: 19 April 2026

=== Depth chart ===
Pos.	Starting 5	Bench 1	Bench 2	Bench 3	Inactive
C	Iliana Rupert	Nikolina Milić	Teaira McCowan		Jonquel Jones (injured)
PF	Emma Meesseman	Tilbe Şenyürek	Meltem Avcı		Breanna Stewart
SF	Gabby Williams	Tuana Vural	Selen Baş
SG	Kayla McBride	Sevgi Uzun
PG	Julie Allemand	Alperi Onar	Olcay Çakır	Ayşe Yılmaz

=== Transactions ===
==== In ====
No.	Pos.	Nat.	Name	Age	Moving from		Ends	Date	Source
25	PF	(United States)	Monique Billings	29	Golden State Valkyries	(United States)	Short-term	17 July 2025	
17	PF/C	(United States) (Spain)	Megan Gustafson	28	Las Vegas Aces	(United States)	Short-term	17 July 2025	
14	PF/C	(France)	Dominique Malonga	19	Seattle Storm	(United States)	June 2027	17 July 2025	
12	PF/C	(France)	Iliana Rupert	24	Golden State Valkyries	(United States)	June 2027	17 July 2025	
35	PF/C	(The Bahamas) (Bosnia and Herzegovina)	Jonquel Jones	31	New York Liberty	(United States)	June 2026	17 July 2025	
8	G/F	(Australia)	Rebecca Allen	32	Chicago Sky	(United States)	Short-term	26 September 2025	
14	C	(United States) (Turkey)	Teaira McCowan	29	Dallas Wings	(United States)	June 2026	18 October 2025	
21	SG	(United States)	Kayla McBride	33	Minnesota Lynx	(United States)	June 2026	19 October 2025	
33	PF	(Turkey)	Meltem Avcı	28	Melikgazi Kayseri Basketbol	(Turkey)	June 2026	16 December 2025	
31	C	(Serbia)	Nikolina Milić	31	Beşiktaş Boa	(Turkey)	June 2026	23 December 2025	
30	PF	(United States)	Breanna Stewart	31	Mist BC	(United States)	June 2026	16 February 2026	

==== Out ====
No.	Pos.	Nat.	Name	Age	Moving to		Date	Source
21	C	(France)	Marième Badiane	30	Beretta Famila Schio	(Italy)	1 June 2025	
13	C	(Serbia)	Nikolina Milić	31	Beşiktaş Boa	(Turkey)	1 June 2025	
31	C	(United States)	Tina Charles	36	Connecticut Sun	(United States)	1 June 2025	
9	C	(United States) (Germany)	Nyara Sabally	25	New York Liberty	(United States)	1 June 2025	
14	PF/C	(France)	Dominique Malonga	19	Breeze BC	(United States)	20 October 2025	
8	G/F	(Australia)	Rebecca Allen	33	Lunar Owls BC	(United States)	6 November 2025	
25	PF	(United States)	Monique Billings	29	Hive BC	(United States)	6 November 2025	
9	F	(Turkey)	İdil Saçalır	23	Beşiktaş Boa	(Turkey)	5 December 2025	
17	PF/C	(United States) (Spain)	Megan Gustafson	29	Las Vegas Aces	(United States)	27 December 2025	

==== Contract renewals ====
No.	Pos.	Nat.	Name	Age	Cont.	Date	Source
4	PG	(Turkey)	Olcay Çakır	32	1-year	17 July 2025	
15	PF	(Turkey)	Tilbe Şenyürek	30	1-year	17 July 2025	
11	PF	(Belgium)	Emma Meesseman	32	1-year	17 July 2025	

== Pre-season and friendlies ==
=== Friendly matches ===
18 September 2025 Erciyes Cup	Fenerbahçe Opet (Turkish Basketball Federation)	78–64	(Turkish Basketball Federation) Çimsa ÇBK Mersin	Kayseri
16:00 TRT (UTC+3)
	Pts: Vural 17	Boxscore		Arena: Kadir Has Spor Salonu

19 September 2025 Erciyes Cup	Melikgazi Kayseri Basketbol (Turkish Basketball Federation)	60–80	(Turkish Basketball Federation) Fenerbahçe Opet	Kayseri
18:00 TRT (UTC+3)
		Boxscore	Pts: Onar 15	Arena: Kadir Has Spor Salonu

20 September 2025 Erciyes Cup	Emlak Konut (Turkish Basketball Federation)	72–53	(Turkish Basketball Federation) Fenerbahçe Opet	Kayseri
14:00 TRT (UTC+3)
		Boxscore	Pts: Şenyürek 12	Arena: Kadir Has Spor Salonu

25 September 2025 Fenerbahçe Opet Tournament	Fenerbahçe Opet (Turkish Basketball Federation)	70–69	(Turkish Basketball Federation) Melikgazi Kayseri Basketbol	Istanbul
19:00 TRT (UTC+3)
		Boxscore		Arena: Metro Enerji Sports Hall; Attendance: 0

26 September 2025 Fenerbahçe Opet Tournament	Fenerbahçe Opet (Turkish Basketball Federation)	71–43	(Turkish Basketball Federation) OGM Ormanspor	Istanbul
19:00 TRT (UTC+3)	Scoring by quarter: 22–7, 18–15, 18–6, 13–15
	Pts: Şenyürek 16	Boxscore		Arena: Metro Enerji Sports Hall; Attendance: 0

27 September 2025 Fenerbahçe Opet Tournament	Fenerbahçe Opet (Turkish Basketball Federation)	88–64	(Turkish Basketball Federation) Beşiktaş BOA	Istanbul
16:00 TRT (UTC+3)	Scoring by quarter: 31–17, 21–15, 21–12, 15–20
	Pts: Rupert 20	Boxscore		Arena: Metro Enerji Sports Hall; Attendance: 0

14 April 2026 Friendly	Perfumerías Avenida (Spanish Basketball Federation)	82–95	(Turkish Basketball Federation) Fenerbahçe Opet	Salamanca
	Scoring by quarter: 22–23, 20–33, 14–18, 26–21
		Boxscore	Pts: Milić 22	Arena: Pabellón Municipal de Würzburg Silvia Domínguez

== Overview ==
Competition	First match	Last match	Starting round	Final position	Record							
Competition	First match	Last match	Starting round	Final position	Pld	W	D	L	PF	PA	PD	Win %
Basketball Super League	4 October 2025	4 April 2026	Round 1	Winners	27	27	0	0	2,403	1,710	+693	100.00
EuroLeague Women	9 October 2025	19 April 2026	Round 1	Winners	16	15	0	1	1,307	994	+313	93.75
Turkish Cup	6 January 2026	11 January 2026	Quarterfinal	Winners	3	3	0	0	279	188	+91	100.00
Presidential Cup	3 December 2025		Final	Winners	1	1	0	0	104	77	+27	100.00
Total					47	46	0	1	4,093	2,969	+1124	97.87

Source: Competitions

== Competitions ==
=== Presidential Cup ===
3 December 2025	Fenerbahçe Opet	104–77	Çimsa ÇBK Mersin	Ankara
19:00 TRT (UTC+3)	Scoring by quarter: 22–25, 23–22, 28–12, 31–18
	Pts: McBride 24; Rebs: Meesseman 7 Asts: Onar 9 PIR: Meesseman 34	Boxscore	Pts: Burke, Vanloo 18; Rebs: Ural 7 Asts: Vanloo 5 PIR: Burke 22	Arena: Ankara Arena; Attendance: 2,907; Referees: Aydın Karaçam, Ozan Gönen, Yiğit Gönültaş

=== Basketball Super League ===
==== League table ====
Pos	Team	Pld	W	L	PF	PA	PD	Pts	Qualification
1	Fenerbahçe	20	20	0	1778	1261	+517	40	Advance to playoffs
2	Galatasaray	20	17	3	1482	1183	+299	37	Advance to playoffs
3	Emlak Konut SK	20	14	6	1495	1290	+205	34	Advance to playoffs
4	ÇBK Mersin	20	14	6	1578	1343	+235	34	Advance to playoffs
5	Beşiktaş	20	11	9	1485	1446	+39	31	Advance to playoffs
6	Botaş	20	11	9	1532	1448	+84	31	Advance to playoffs
7	Nesibe Aydın	20	11	9	1514	1478	+36	31	Advance to playoffs
8	Kayseri Basketbol	20	6	14	1328	1502	−174	26	Advance to playoffs
9	Ormanspor	20	4	16	1211	1513	−302	24	
10	Çanakkale Belediyespor	20	2	18	1217	1756	−539	22	
11	Kocaeli Women's Basketball (Note: On 28 November 2025, Kocaeli Women's Basketball withdrew from the league.)	20	0	20	0	400	−400	0	Relegation to TKBL

Source: KBSL
Rules for classification: 1) Points; 2) Points difference; 3) Points scored.

==== Results summary ====
Overall						Home					Away				
Pld	W	L	PF	PA	PD	W	L	PF	PA	PD	W	L	PF	PA	PD
20	20	0	1778	1261	+517	10	0	931	623	+308	10	0	847	638	+209

Source: TBF.org.tr

==== Results by round ====
Round	1	2	3	4	5	6	7	8	9	10	11	12	13	14	15	16	17	18	19	20	21	22
Ground	H	A	A	B	A	H	A	H	A	H	A	A	H	H	B	H	A	H	A	H	A	H
Result	W	W	W	B	W	W	W	W	W	W	W	W	W	W	B	W	W	W	W	W	W	W
Position	3	1	1	3	2	2	1	1	1	1	1	1	1	1	1	1	1	1	1	1	1	1

Source: TBF.org.tr
A = Away; H = Home; B = Bye; W = Win; L = Loss

==== Matches ====
Note: All times are TRT (UTC+3) as listed by Turkish Basketball Federation.

4 October 2025 1	Fenerbahçe Opet	71–53	Emlak Konut	Istanbul
14:00	Scoring by quarter: 21–19, 13–10, 20–9, 17–15
	Pts: Meesseman 16; Rebs: Meesseman 10; Asts: Uzun, Meesseman 7 PIR: Meesseman 25	Boxscore	Pts: Thomas 15; Rebs: Thomas 6 Asts: Thomas 6 PIR: Thomas 16	Arena: Metro Enerji Sports Hall; Attendance: 250; Referees: Umut Özgün Ergün, Mehmet Burak Anlatıcı, Ali Rıza Pinat

12 October 2025 2	OGM Ormanspor	62–80	Fenerbahçe Opet	Ankara
15:00	Scoring by quarter: 12–17, 17–27, 23–18, 10–18
	Pts: Anigwe 22; Rebs: Anigwe 12; Asts: Erat 6 PIR: Anigwe 31	Boxscore	Pts: Billings 22; Rebs: Billings 7 Asts: Allemand 13; PIR: Billings, Allemand 25	Arena: Sait Zarifoğlu Sports Hall; Attendance: 300; Referees: Yiğit Gönültaş, Sezer Bor, Ali Osman Kanık

18 October 2025 3	Kocaeli Women's Basketball	0–20	Fenerbahçe Opet	Kocaeli
16:00	Scoring by quarter: 27–21, 10–25, 11–24, 22–16
	Pts: Sönmez 16; Rebs: Martínez 9 Asts: Bul 6 PIR: Martínez 20	Boxscore	Pts: Rupert, Allen 18; Rebs: Billings 10; Asts: three players 6 PIR: Rupert 28	Arena: Şehit Polis Recep Topaloğlu Sports Hall; Attendance: 350; Referees: Ozan Gönen, Kadir Giray Esen, Musa Onur Savaş
Note: Fenerbahçe had won the match played on 18 October 2025 by 86–70. However, Kocaeli withdrew from the league on 28 November 2025.

4	Bye

1 November 2025 5	Dardanel Çanakkale Belediyespor	81–103	Fenerbahçe Opet	Çanakkale
15:00	Scoring by quarter: 15–36, 25–25, 26–23, 15–19
	Pts: Powers 26; Rebs: Powers 10; Asts: Peddy 8 PIR: Powers 32	Boxscore	Pts: Meesseman 26; Rebs: Meesseman 10; Asts: Meesseman 8 PIR: Meesseman 42	Arena: Çanakkale Sporcu Gelişim Merkezi; Attendance: 1,200; Referees: Hüseyin Çamcı, Burak Durmuş, Burak Aktaş

6 November 2025 6	Fenerbahçe Opet	104–84	Botaş	Istanbul
14:00	Scoring by quarter: 23–26, 36–21, 21–16, 24–21
	Pts: Gustafson 26; Rebs: Gustafson 8 Asts: Çakır 9 PIR: Gustafson 26	Boxscore	Pts: Dantas 21; Rebs: Poyraz 9 Asts: Bejedi 7 PIR: Dantas 19	Arena: Metro Enerji Sports Hall; Attendance: 100; Referees: Fatih Güler, Cemil Uygül, Kamil Alok

23 November 2025 7	Galatasaray Çağdaş Faktoring	71–75	Fenerbahçe Opet	Istanbul
18:30	Scoring by quarter: 15–21, 14–21, 22–15, 20–18
	Pts: Smalls 21; Rebs: Juhász 7 Asts: Oblak 5 PIR: Smalls 28	Boxscore	Pts: Rupert 20; Rebs: Meesseman 8 Asts: Meesseman 6 PIR: Rupert 19	Arena: Sinan Erdem Dome; Attendance: 1,311; Referees: Önder Yılmaz, Berk Kurtulmuş, Burak Erkan

29 November 2025 8	Fenerbahçe Opet	107–78	Beşiktaş BOA	Istanbul
17:00	Scoring by quarter: 28–16, 23–24, 32–13, 24–25
	Pts: McCowan 20; Rebs: Rupert 9 Asts: Meesseman 11; PIR: Meesseman 28	Boxscore	Pts: Fasoula 20; Rebs: Whitcomb 5 Asts: Whitcomb 8 PIR: Whitcomb 18	Arena: Metro Enerji Sports Hall; Attendance: 580; Referees: Umut Özgün Ergün, Mehmet Burak Anlatıcı, İzel Deniz Pehlivan Çakıcı

6 December 2025 9	Melikgazi Kayseri Basketbol	79–93	Fenerbahçe Opet	Kayseri
16:00	Scoring by quarter: 15–26, 16–19, 27–22, 21–26
	Pts: Kunek, Dangerfield 28; Rebs: Avcı 6 Asts: Williams, Dangerfield 4 PIR: Kunek, Dangerfield 28	Boxscore	Pts: Uzun 18; Rebs: Rupert, Gustafson 8 Asts: Meesseman 11; PIR: Meesseman 30	Arena: Kadir Has Spor Salonu; Attendance: 2,800; Referees: Nihat Çetin, Haldun Çoban, Kerem Altıntaş

13 December 2025 10	Fenerbahçe Opet	90–81	Çimsa ÇBK Mersin	Istanbul
17:00	Scoring by quarter: 25–13, 28–24, 25–18, 12–26
	Pts: Meesseman 19; Rebs: McCowan, Meesseman 10; Asts: Allemand 5 PIR: Meesseman 26	Boxscore	Pts: Juškaitė 27; Rebs: Geiselsöder, Burke 6 Asts: Vanloo 6 PIR: Juškaitė 27	Arena: Metro Enerji Sports Hall; Attendance: 440; Referees: Fatih Güler, İsmail Binbir, Münevver Özemre

21 December 2025 11	Nesibe Aydın	69–99	Fenerbahçe Opet	Ankara
14:00	Scoring by quarter: 22–34, 12–23, 21–25, 14–17
	Pts: Bone 27; Rebs: Davis, Bone 7 Asts: Green, Bone 4 PIR: Bone 31	Boxscore	Pts: Rupert 21; Rebs: McCowan 11; Asts: Onar 7 PIR: Rupert 25	Arena: TOBB Sport Hall; Attendance: 1,100; Referees: Mesut Öztürk, Niyazi Yasin Kahraman, Enes Duran

24 December 2025 12	Emlak Konut	70–88	Fenerbahçe Opet	Istanbul
16:30	Scoring by quarter: 23–29, 13–14, 11–21, 23–24
	Pts: Macaulay 24; Rebs: Ndour-Fall 10; Asts: Thomas 6 PIR: Macaulay 22	Boxscore	Pts: Rupert 20; Rebs: Rupert 9 Asts: Williams, McBride 8 PIR: Rupert 23	Arena: Başakşehir Spor Kompleksi; Attendance: 200; Referees: Önder Yılmaz, Uğur Yüksel, Yasin Alkan

27 December 2025 13	Fenerbahçe Opet	109–60	OGM Ormanspor	Istanbul
13:00	Scoring by quarter: 29–10, 28–21, 23–10, 29–19
	Pts: Gustafson 28; Rebs: Gustafson 10; Asts: Allemand 77; PIR: Gustafson 36	Boxscore	Pts: Şimşek, DeShields 15; Rebs: DeShields 10; Asts: Özen 4 PIR: Şimşek 18	Arena: Metro Enerji Sports Hall; Attendance: 160; Referees: İbrahim Altıntaş, Anıl Veziroğlu, Seçkin Şentürk

14	Fenerbahçe Opet	20–0	Kocaeli Women's Basketball	Istanbul
		Boxscore		Arena: Metro Enerji Sports Hall

15	Bye

17 January 2026 16	Fenerbahçe Opet	129–43	Dardanel Çanakkale Belediyespor	Istanbul
13:00	Scoring by quarter: 34–10, 28–7, 31–15, 36–11
	Pts: Milić 25; Rebs: Milić 17; Asts: McBride 8 PIR: Milić 41	Boxscore	Pts: Tokmak 16; Rebs: Tokmak 3 Asts: Tongar 5 PIR: Tokmak 11	Arena: Metro Enerji Sports Hall; Attendance: 100; Referees: Mesut Öztürk, İsmail Binbir, Ali Küçükerdem

25 January 2025 17	Botaş	68–90	Fenerbahçe Opet	Ankara
13:00	Scoring by quarter: 9–19, 23–19, 11–32, 25–20
	Pts: Bejedi, Dantas 21; Rebs: Scherf 7 Asts: Bejedi 7 PIR: Bejedi 18	Boxscore	Pts: Williams 19; Rebs: Williams 8 Asts: Uzun, Williams 7 PIR: Williams 32	Arena: Ankara Arena; Attendance: 300; Referees: Münevver Özemre, Özkan Talo, Ali Osman Kanık

1 February 2026 18	Fenerbahçe Opet	75–70	Galatasaray Çağdaş Faktoring	Istanbul
18:00	Scoring by quarter: 23–25, 14–11, 22–18, 16–16
	Pts: Çakır 13; Rebs: McCowan 8 Asts: McBride 8 PIR: McBride 20	Boxscore	Pts: Kuier 28; Rebs: Williams 6 Asts: Erdoğan 8 PIR: Kuier 23	Arena: Metro Enerji Sports Hall; Attendance: 950; Referees: Orkun Yurttaş, Aydın Karaçam, Ali Rıza Pinat

8 February 2026 19	Beşiktaş BOA	68–105	Fenerbahçe Opet	Istanbul
17:30	Scoring by quarter: 19–28, 18–24, 15–26, 16–27
	Pts: Fraser 17; Rebs: Fasoula 6 Asts: Fasoula 5 PIR: Fraser 15	Boxscore	Pts: Onar 24; Rebs: Meesseman 9 Asts: Meesseman 8 PIR: Meesseman 31	Arena: Akatlar Arena; Attendance: 179; Referees: Önder Yılmaz, Sertan Kırklar, Haldun Çoban

13 February 2026 20	Fenerbahçe Opet	118–76	Melikgazi Kayseri Basketbol	Istanbul
18:00	Scoring by quarter: 34–17, 35–14, 26–25, 23–20
	Pts: Rupert 22; Rebs: McBride, Milić 6 Asts: McBride 8 PIR: Rupert 28	Boxscore	Pts: Collier 31; Rebs: Dangerfield 8 Asts: Dangerfield 6 PIR: Adıcan 23	Arena: Metro Enerji Sports Hall; Attendance: 105; Referees: Göksun Öz, Melikşah Mercan, Kerem Altıntaş

21 February 2026 21	Çimsa ÇBK Mersin	70–94	Fenerbahçe Opet	Mersin
16:00	Scoring by quarter: 23–25, 10–21, 19–21, 18–27
	Pts: Juškaitė 21; Rebs: Geiselsöder 7 Asts: Allen 6 PIR: Juškaitė 21	Boxscore	Pts: McBride 24; Rebs: Rupert 12; Asts: Meesseman 10; PIR: Rupert 31	Arena: Servet Tazegül Arena; Attendance: 3,000; Referees: Turgut Işık, Yiğit Gönültaş, Fatih Kurt

28 February 2026 22	Fenerbahçe Opet	108–78	Nesibe Aydın	Istanbul
16:00	Scoring by quarter: 29–23, 24–23, 23–17, 32–15
	Pts: Rupert 24; Rebs: Meesseman 8 Asts: McBride 10; PIR: Rupert 29	Boxscore	Pts: Davis 26; Rebs: Davis 10; Asts: Green; PIR: Davis 30	Arena: Metro Enerji Sports Hall; Attendance: 150; Referees: İbrahim Altıntaş, Sertan Kırklar, Rahmi Güner

==== Quarterfinals ====
2 March 2026 1	Fenerbahçe Opet	113–42 (Series: 1–0)	Melikgazi Kayseri Basketbol	Istanbul
13:00	Scoring by quarter: 32–14, 29–13, 29–10, 23–5
	Pts: Milić 22; Rebs: McCowan 13; Asts: Allemand 7 PIR: Milić 27	Boxscore	Pts: Collier 17; Rebs: Dangerfield 6 Asts: Dangerfield 4 PIR: Collier 11	Arena: Metro Enerji Sports Hall; Attendance: 100; Referees: Fatih Güler, Münevver Özemre, Ali Osman Kanık

3 March 2026 2	Melikgazi Kayseri Basketbol	59–95 (Series: 0–2)	Fenerbahçe Opet	Istanbul
13:00	Scoring by quarter: 17–24, 13–26, 13–23, 16–22
	Pts: Arı 18; Rebs: Dangerfield 9 Asts: Arı 5 PIR: Arı 22	Boxscore	Pts: Rupert 19; Rebs: McCowan 6 Asts: Allemand 9 PIR: four players 18	Arena: Metro Enerji Sports Hall; Attendance: 50; Referees: Orkun Yurttaş, Niyazi Yasin Kahraman, Halil Ata Günal

==== Semifinals ====
23 March 2026 1	Fenerbahçe Opet	73–62 (Series: 1–0)	Çimsa ÇBK Mersin	Istanbul
18:30	Scoring by quarter: 22–15, 15–16, 21–15, 15–16
	Pts: Meesseman 22; Rebs: Meesseman 11; Asts: Allemand 10; PIR: Meesseman 34	Boxscore	Pts: Juškaitė 16; Rebs: Juškaitė 8 Asts: Burke 5 PIR: Burke 16	Arena: Metro Enerji Sports Hall; Attendance: 250; Referees: Mesut Öztürk, Yarkın Keskin, Özkan Talo

25 March 2026 2	Çimsa ÇBK Mersin	65–95 (Series: 0–2)	Fenerbahçe Opet	Mersin
18:30	Scoring by quarter: 16–22, 14–19, 16–31, 19–23
	Pts: Juškaitė 17; Rebs: Ural, Juškaitė 8 Asts: Vanloo 6 PIR: Juškaitė 14	Boxscore	Pts: Williams, Meesseman 19; Rebs: Meesseman 12; Asts: Allemand 12; PIR: Meesseman 31	Arena: Servet Tazegül Arena; Attendance: 1,600; Referees: Önder Yılmaz, Hüseyin Çamcı, Niyazi Yasin Kahraman

==== Finals ====
29 March 2026 1	Fenerbahçe Opet	85–70 (Series: 1–0)	Galatasaray Çağdaş Faktoring	Istanbul
16:00	Scoring by quarter: 18–17, 21–14, 32–17, 14–22
	Pts: Rupert 19; Rebs: Meesseman 8 Asts: Meesseman 6 PIR: Uzun, Rupert 23	Boxscore	Pts: Johannès 22; Rebs: Kuier 6 Asts: Fitik, Erdoğan 4 PIR: Johannès 16	Arena: Metro Enerji Sports Hall; Attendance: 871; Referees: İbrahim Altıntaş, Ahmet Taner İbin, Ahmet Kemal Digilli

1 April 2026 2	Fenerbahçe Opet	77–75 (Series: 2–0)	Galatasaray Çağdaş Faktoring	Istanbul
19:30	Scoring by quarter: 29–17, 14–19, 20–19, 14–20
	Pts: Meesseman 20; Rebs: Meesseman 12; Asts: Allemand 8 PIR: Meesseman 33	Boxscore	Pts: Kuier 18; Rebs: Kuier 5 Asts: Erdoğan 6 PIR: Kuier 24	Arena: Metro Enerji Sports Hall; Attendance: 781; Referees: Aydın Karaçam, Fatih Güler, Samet Biner

4 April 2026 3	Galatasaray Çağdaş Faktoring	76–87 (Series: 0–3)	Fenerbahçe Opet	Istanbul
16:00	Scoring by quarter: 17–22, 23–23, 13–24, 23–18
	Pts: Johannès 17; Rebs: Kuier, Williams 6 Asts: Johannès 4 PIR: Williams 15	Boxscore	Pts: Rupert 24; Rebs: Rupert 10; Asts: Allemand 13; PIR: Rupert 29	Arena: Sinan Erdem Dome; Attendance: 1,470; Referees: Orkun Yurttaş, Ozan Gönen, Berk Kurtulmuş

=== EuroLeague Women ===
==== First round ====
===== Group C =====
Pos	Team	Pld	W	L	PF	PA	PD	Pts	Qualification
1	(Turkish Basketball Federation) Fenerbahçe Opet	6	6	0	541	364	+177	12	Second round
2	(Spanish Basketball Federation) Valencia Basket	6	4	2	497	399	+98	10	Second round
3	(Hungarian Basketball Federation) DVTK HUN-Therm	6	1	5	389	514	−125	7 (Note: DVTK HUN-Therm 144–132 Olympiacos SFP)	Second round
4	(Hellenic Basketball Federation) Olympiacos SFP	6	1	5	383	533	−150	7	EuroCup Women

Source: EuroLeague Women
Rules for classification: 1) Points; 2) Points difference; 3) Points scored.

===== Results summary =====
Overall						Home					Away				
Pld	W	L	PF	PA	PD	W	L	PF	PA	PD	W	L	PF	PA	PD
6	6	0	541	364	+177	3	0	278	187	+91	3	0	263	177	+86

Source: EuroLeague Women

===== Results by round =====
Round	1	2	3	4	5	6
Ground	A	A	H	H	H	A
Result	W	W	W	W	W	W
Position	1	1	1	1	1	1

Source: EuroLeague Women
A = Away; H = Home; W = Win; L = Loss

===== Matches =====
8 October 2025 1	DVTK HUN-Therm (Hungarian Basketball Federation)	58–89	(Turkish Basketball Federation) Fenerbahçe Opet	Miskolc
18:00 CEST (UTC+2)	Scoring by quarter: 19–22, 7–17, 19–23, 13–27
	Pts: Ginzo 13; Rebs: Kanyasi 6 Asts: Aho 7 PIR: Aho 13	Boxscore	Pts: Rupert 16; Rebs: Allemand, Billings 6 Asts: Allemand 8 PIR: three players 18	Arena: DVTK Arena; Attendance: 2,500; Referees: Silvia Marziali, Jan Baloun, Aurimas Borušas

16 October 2025 2	Valencia Basket (Spanish Basketball Federation)	72–75(OT)	(Turkish Basketball Federation) Fenerbahçe Opet	Valencia
19:15 CEST (UTC+2)	Scoring by quarter: 24–13, 7–15, 17–25, 17–12, Overtime: 7–10
	Pts: Fam, Carrera 17; Rebs: Fam 7 Asts: Romero 12; PIR: Fam 22	Boxscore	Pts: Billings 20; Rebs: Rupert 12; Asts: Allemand 8 PIR: Rupert 25	Arena: Roig Arena; Attendance: 4,048; Referees: Paulina Karolina Gajdosz, Sónia Teixeira, Domen Krajnc

22 October 2025 3	Fenerbahçe Opet (Turkish Basketball Federation)	94–73	(Hellenic Basketball Federation) Olympiacos SFP	Istanbul
20:00 TRT (UTC+3)	Scoring by quarter: 19–23, 26–19, 24–15, 25–16
	Pts: Meesseman 17; Rebs: Rupert 7 Asts: Allemand 12; PIR: Rupert, Allemand 29	Boxscore	Pts: Johnson 17; Rebs: Woolfolk, Johnson 5 Asts: Kollatou, Woolfolk 6 PIR: Johnson 21	Arena: Ülker Sports and Event Hall; Attendance: 4,000; Referees: Amalia Marchiș, Svetlana Stoyanova, Mikheil Vartanov

29 October 2025 4	Fenerbahçe Opet (Turkish Basketball Federation)	113–65	(Hungarian Basketball Federation) DVTK HUN-Therm	Istanbul
20:00 TRT (UTC+3)	Scoring by quarter: 26–13, 27–13, 35–20, 25–19
	Pts: McBride 16; Rebs: Rupert, Allemand 6 Asts: Onar 10; PIR: Rupert, Allemand 22	Boxscore	Pts: Lelik 14; Rebs: Westbeld 6 Asts: Kanyasi, Lelik 4 PIR: Kanyasi 12	Arena: Ülker Sports and Event Hall; Attendance: 4,000; Referees: Esperanza Mendoza, Ewa Matuszewska, Suzana Vujičić

4 November 2025 5	Fenerbahçe Opet (Turkish Basketball Federation)	71–49	(Spanish Basketball Federation) Valencia Basket	Istanbul
20:00 TRT (UTC+3)	Scoring by quarter: 20–9, 15–15, 20–13, 16–12
	Pts: McBride 16; Rebs: Allemand 10; Asts: Allemand 8 PIR: Allemand 33	Boxscore	Pts: Buenavida, Carrera 8 Rebs: Fiebich, Alexander 5 Asts: Buenavida, Romero 3 PIR: Buenavida, Alexander 10	Arena: Ülker Sports and Event Hall; Attendance: 2,000; Referees: Jelena Tomić, Nataša Dragojević, Petr Blahout

26 November 2025 6	Olympiacos SFP (Hellenic Basketball Federation)	47–99	(Turkish Basketball Federation) Fenerbahçe Opet	Piraeus
18:30 EET (UTC+2)	Scoring by quarter: 8–31, 18–18, 13–30, 8–20
	Pts: Christinaki 9 Rebs: Karlafti, Christinaki 5 Asts: Kollatou 4 PIR: Karlafti, Christinaki 9	Boxscore	Pts: Meesseman 19; Rebs: Gustafson 9 Asts: Allemand, Meesseman 8 PIR: Meesseman 29	Arena: Peace and Friendship Stadium; Attendance: 350; Referees: Armin Mutapčić, Hrvoje Ćavar, Veronika Vávrová

==== Second round ====
===== Group F =====
Pos	Team	Pld	W	L	PF	PA	PD	Pts	Qualification
1	(Turkish Basketball Federation) Fenerbahçe Opet	12	11	1	1011	753	+258	23	Semifinal play-in
2	(French Federation of Basketball) Basket Landes	12	8	4	828	780	+48	20	Semifinal play-in
3	(Italian Basketball Federation) Umana Reyer Venezia	12	7	5	812	858	−46	19 (Note: Umana Reyer Venezia 152–141 Casademont Zaragoza)	Quarterfinal play-in
4	(Spanish Basketball Federation) Casademont Zaragoza	12	7	5	871	815	+56	19	Quarterfinal play-in
5	(Spanish Basketball Federation) Valencia Basket	12	6	6	905	825	+80	18	
6	(Hungarian Basketball Federation) DVTK HUN-Therm	12	1	11	768	969	−201	13	

Source: EuroLeague Women
Rules for classification: 1) Points; 2) Points difference; 3) Points scored.

===== Results summary =====
Overall						Home					Away				
Pld	W	L	PF	PA	PD	W	L	PF	PA	PD	W	L	PF	PA	PD
6	5	1	470	389	+81	3	0	243	184	+59	2	1	227	205	+22

Source: EuroLeague Women

===== Results by round =====
Round	7	8	9	10	11	12
Ground	H	A	A	A	H	H
Result	W	W	L	W	W	W
Position	1	1	1	1	1	1

Source: EuroLeague Women
A = Away; H = Home; W = Win; L = Loss

===== Matches =====
10 December 2025 7	Fenerbahçe Opet (Turkish Basketball Federation)	96–48	(Italian Basketball Federation) Umana Reyer Venezia	Istanbul
20:00 TRT (UTC+3)	Scoring by quarter: 30–2, 23–19, 22–20, 21–7
	Pts: Rupert 20; Rebs: Gustafson 13; Asts: Allemand10; PIR: Williams 22	Boxscore	Pts: Dojkić 14; Rebs: Nicolodi 7 Asts: Pasa 4 PIR: Charles 15	Arena: Ülker Sports and Event Hall; Attendance: 3,422; Referees: Nataša Dragojević, Sónia Teixeira, Primož Pipan

18 December 2025 8	Casademont Zaragoza (Spanish Basketball Federation)	64–95	(Turkish Basketball Federation) Fenerbahçe Opet	Zaragoza
20:00 CET (UTC+1)	Scoring by quarter: 15–32, 21–23, 13–21, 15–19
	Pts: Hempe 18; Rebs: Hempe 10; Asts: Ortiz 9 PIR: Hempe 25	Boxscore	Pts: Gustafson 27; Rebs: Meesseman 11; Asts: Allemand 7 PIR: Gustafson 29	Arena: Pabellón Príncipe Felipe; Attendance: 6,170; Referees: Veronika Obertová, Tiago Roxo Perdigão, José Pedroso

14 January 2026 9	Basket Landes (French Federation of Basketball)	80–61	(Turkish Basketball Federation) Fenerbahçe Opet	Mont-de-Marsan
19:30 CET (UTC+1)	Scoring by quarter: 28–18, 15–16, 17–14, 20–13
	Pts: Lacan 28; Rebs: Musa 10; Asts: Droguet 4 PIR: Lacan 25	Boxscore	Pts: Rupert 14; Rebs: Meesseman, Milić 5 Asts: Meesseman 8 PIR: Meesseman 26	Arena: Espace François Mitterrand; Attendance: 2,600; Referees: Esperanza Mendoza, Ivana Ivanović, Karol Kowalski

22 January 2026 10	Umana Reyer Venezia (Italian Basketball Federation)	61–71	(Turkish Basketball Federation) Fenerbahçe Opet	Venice
19:30 CET (UTC+1)	Scoring by quarter: 12–27, 18–24, 19–8, 12–12
	Pts: Dojkić 17; Rebs: Mavunga, Holmes 6 Asts: Charles, Dojkić 3 PIR: Mavunga 16	Boxscore	Pts: Williams, Rupert 18; Rebs: Allemand 8 Asts: Allemand 6 PIR: Williams 23	Arena: Palasport Taliercio; Attendance: 940; Referees: Nemanja Ninković, Alin Faur, Nace Mohorič

28 January 2026 11	Fenerbahçe Opet (Turkish Basketball Federation)	69–67	(Spanish Basketball Federation) Casademont Zaragoza	Istanbul
20:00 TRT (UTC+3)	Scoring by quarter: 22–21, 25–13, 6–19, 16–14
	Pts: Meesseman 21; Rebs: Rupert 8 Asts: Allemand 5 PIR: Meesseman 25	Boxscore	Pts: Leite 12; Rebs: Voráčková 7 Asts: Ortiz 5 PIR: Leite 14	Arena: Ülker Sports and Event Hall; Attendance: 2,000; Referees: Siniša Prpa, Hendrik Laas, Sava Cetković

4 February 2026 12	Fenerbahçe Opet (Turkish Basketball Federation)	78–69	(French Federation of Basketball) Basket Landes	Istanbul
20:00 TRT (UTC+3)	Scoring by quarter: 21–27, 15–8, 16–18, 26–16
	Pts: Meesseman 21; Rebs: Williams 9 Asts: Allemand 10; PIR: Meesseman 28	Boxscore	Pts: Lacan 11; Rebs: Macquet 7 Asts: Lacan 7 PIR: Lacan 16	Arena: Ülker Sports and Event Hall; Attendance: 1,500; Referees: Viola Györgyi, Sara Månsson, Armin Mutapčić

==== Play-in ====
===== Semifinal =====
18 February 2026 1	Fenerbahçe Opet (Turkish Basketball Federation)	87–69 (Series: 1–0)	(Spanish Basketball Federation) Spar Girona	Istanbul
20:00 TRT (UTC+3)	Scoring by quarter: 19–14, 18–21, 30–20, 20–14
	Pts: Rupert 20; Rebs: Allemand 8 Asts: Allemand 11; PIR: Meesseman 25	Boxscore	Pts: Jocytė 13; Rebs: Coulibaly 8 Asts: Holm 3 PIR: Jocytė, Coulibaly 15	Arena: Ülker Sports and Event Hall; Attendance: 2,500; Referees: Sónia Teixeira, Josip Jurčević, Siniša Prpa

25 February 2026 2	Spar Girona (Spanish Basketball Federation)	58–65 (Series: 0–2)	(Turkish Basketball Federation) Fenerbahçe Opet	Girona
19:30 CET (UTC+1)	Scoring by quarter: 18–20, 14–12, 18–21, 8–12
	Pts: Coulibaly 19; Rebs: Coulibaly 9 Asts: Jocytė 5 PIR: Coulibaly 22	Boxscore	Pts: Rupert 21; Rebs: Rupert 9 Asts: Meesseman, Allemand 7 PIR: Rupert 24	Arena: Pavelló Fontajau; Attendance: 3,221; Referees: Nemanja Ninković, Tomasz Wit Langowski, Diogo Martins

==== Final Six ====
===== Semifinal =====
17 April 2026	Fenerbahçe Opet (Turkish Basketball Federation)	76–59	(Spanish Basketball Federation) Spar Girona	Zaragoza
17:30 CEST (UTC+2)	Scoring by quarter: 12–17, 25–10, 17–13, 22–19
	Pts: Meesseman 14; Rebs: Meesseman 6 Asts: Meesseman 6 PIR: Meesseman 23	Boxscore	Pts: Bibby, Holm 16; Rebs: Holm 10; Asts: Holm 5 PIR: Holm 19	Arena: Pabellón Príncipe Felipe; Attendance: 6,707; Referees: Josip Jurčević (CRO), Ewa Matuszweska (POL), Ioannis Agrafiotis (GRE)

===== Final =====
19 April 2026	Galatasaray Çağdaş Faktoring (Turkish Basketball Federation)	55–68	(Turkish Basketball Federation) Fenerbahçe Opet	Zaragoza
20:00 CEST (UTC+2)	Scoring by quarter: 16–17, 16–20, 13–14, 10–17
	Pts: Williams 15; Rebs: Smalls 9 Asts: Kuier 7 PIR: Williams 20	Boxscore	Pts: Meesseman 20; Rebs: Williams, Allemand 8 Asts: Allemand 10; PIR: Allemand 28	Arena: Pabellón Príncipe Felipe; Attendance: 8,737; Referees: Sónia Teixeira (POR), Petar Pešić (SRB), Juozas Barkauskas (LTU)

=== Turkish Basketball Cup ===
6 January 2026 QF	Fenerbahçe Opet	109–56	Nesibe Aydın	Istanbul
20:00 TRT (UTC+3)	Scoring by quarter: 27–17, 24–10, 27–13, 31–16
	Pts: Williams 19; Rebs: Rupert, Avcı 7 Asts: Rupert 7 PIR: Rupert 28	Boxscore	Pts: Davis 21; Rebs: Davis 7 Asts: three players 3 PIR: Davis 29	Arena: Metro Enerji Sports Hall; Attendance: 160; Referees: Hüseyin Çamcı, Münevver Özemre, Burak Durmuş

9 January 2026 SF	Fenerbahçe Opet	84–66	ÇBK Mersin	Denizli
17:00 TRT (UTC+3)	Scoring by quarter: 22–13, 14–28, 25–10, 23–15
	Pts: Uzun 15; Rebs: Rupert 12; Asts: Meesseman 10; PIR: Meesseman 26	Boxscore	Pts: Burke 17; Rebs: Burke 10; Asts: Juškaitė 4 PIR: Burke 26	Arena: Pamukkale University Arena; Attendance: 800; Referees: Turgut Işık, Mesut Öztürk, Yarkın Keskin

11 January 2026 F	Fenerbahçe Opet	86–66	Galatasaray Çağdaş Faktoring	Denizli
16:00 TRT (UTC+3)	Scoring by quarter: 21–16, 26–19, 16–20, 13–11
	Pts: Meesseman 17; Rebs: Meesseman 9 Asts: Uzun 8 PIR: Meesseman 27	Boxscore	Pts: Williams 15; Rebs: Bayram 7 Asts: Smalls, Fitik 5 PIR: Williams 17	Arena: Pamukkale University Arena; Attendance: 3,000; Referees: Berk Kurtulmuş, Samet Biner, Furkan Keseratar

== Statistics ==
Legend
GP	Games played	GS	Games started	MPG	Minutes per game
FG%	Field-goal percentage	3FG%	3-point field-goal percentage	FT%	Free-throw percentage
RPG	Rebounds per game	APG	Assists per game	SPG	Steals per game
BPG	Blocks per game	PPG	Points per game	PIR	PIR per game

Player	Left during season

=== Basketball Super League ===
Player	GP	GS	MPG	2FG%	3FG%	FT%	RPG	APG	SPG	BPG	PPG	PIR
Julie Allemand	24	15	24:23	.667	.246	.885	3.3	6.3	1.5	0.1	6.4	13.6
Sudenur Akarpa	1	0	6:45	1.000	.000	—	1.0	1.0	0	0	4.0	5.0
Meltem Avcı	14	0	12:00	.564	.250	.750	1.2	1.2	0.3	0.1	3.9	5.5
Selen Baş	4	0	7:33	.600	.333	—	0.5	1.3	0.3	0.3	2.3	3.3
Olcay Çakır	24	13	20:39	.675	.378	.833	2.9	3.5	1.2	0.3	6.4	10.3
Ece Erginay	4	0	6:37	.667	.286	.500	0.8	1.8	0.3	0	2.8	3.5
Elma Eymech	1	0	1:29	—	—	—	0	0	0	0	0	0
Kayla McBride	16	13	24:25	.576	.458	.727	4.2	4.9	0.9	0	13.0	17.1
Teaira McCowan	19	11	13:09	.608	.000	.750	4.7	0.8	0.4	0.4	8.1	10.5
Emma Meesseman	19	17	27:33	.669	.458	.825	7.6	6.1	1.4	0.5	15.0	25.3
Nikolina Milić	10	2	12:29	.671	.250	.765	4.6	1.3	1.1	0.3	11.0	14.5
Alperi Onar	19	7	21:16	.674	.385	.944	1.5	3.2	0.7	0	10.4	11.6
Iliana Rupert	21	14	24:23	.685	.407	.762	6.1	2.9	1.1	0.6	15.5	20.4
Tilbe Şenyürek	7	2	15:11	.556	.091	.750	4.1	1.4	0	0	6.6	7.3
Sevgi Uzun	25	19	27:40	.564	.369	.750	2.1	4.5	1.2	0.2	10.2	11.6
Tuana Vural	15	1	7:27	.450	.526	1.000	1.3	0.4	0.4	0	3.3	3.9
Gabby Williams	18	8	22:11	.585	.395	.813	3.7	3.5	2.5	0.1	10.3	14.3
Ayşe Yılmaz	6	0	7:54	.667	.286	—	0.2	0.8	0.5	0	3.0	3.2
Rebecca Allen	5	2	18:20	.539	.522	1.000	4.8	0.6	1.2	0.8	10.6	14.0
Monique Billings	5	2	22:21	.585	.800	.714	5.8	1.6	0.6	0.6	15.0	18.0
Megan Gustafson	6	4	19:41	.851	.333	.667	5.5	0.5	0.5	0.3	17.0	19.3
İdil Saçalır	1	0	1:47	—	—	—	0	0	0	0	0	0

Source: Basketbol Süper Ligi

=== EuroLeague Women ===
Player	GP	GS	MPG	2FG%	3FG%	FT%	RPG	APG	SPG	BPG	PPG	PIR
Julie Allemand	16	16	30.1	.684	.319	.867	6.4	7.6	1.6	0.1	6.9	17.7
Olcay Çakır	14	0	15.1	.480	.462	.857	1.3	2.0	0.6	0.1	3.9	5
Kayla McBride	10	9	29.1	.641	.373	1.000	3.2	3.4	1.7	0.1	14.1	14.4
Teaira McCowan	2	0	7.0	.500	—	1.000	2.0	0.0	0	0	4.0	4.0
Emma Meesseman	15	15	30.2	.594	.273	.750	5.8	3.9	1.5	0.9	14.9	19.9
Nikolina Milić	6	0	13.0	.621	.000	.700	3.3	0.3	0.7	0.2	7.2	7.7
Alperi Onar	11	0	11.5	.583	.385	.846	0.6	2.2	0.5	0	4.9	5.3
Iliana Rupert	16	13	28.2	.689	.339	.882	5.8	1.9	1.8	0.8	15.7	19.3
Breanna Stewart	2	2	25.2	.200	.400	.500	3.5	0	0.5	1.0	6.0	2.0
Tilbe Şenyürek	5	0	10.8	.769	.333	.750	3.8	0.6	0.2	0	6.4	8.4
Sevgi Uzun	16	10	21.7	.439	.405	.941	1.2	3.0	0.9	0.1	6.1	6.9
Tuana Vural	4	0	3.1	.500	—	—	0.5	0	0	0	0.5	0.8
Gabby Williams	10	10	32.7	.467	.358	.714	4.7	3.3	3.0	0.5	12.3	14.6
Ayşe Yılmaz	0	0	—	—	—	—	—	—	—	—	—	—
Rebecca Allen	5	3	25.4	.333	.455	—	4.6	2.0	1.2	0.6	7.2	10.8
Monique Billings	2	1	25.2	.592	.000	.786	6.0	0.5	2.5	1.0	14.5	17.5
Megan Gustafson	6	1	20.8	.657	.300	.833	6.2	1.5	0.3	0.7	14.0	16.3
İdil Saçalır	4	0	6.0	1.000	.333	.750	1.0	0	0.3	0	2.0	2.0

Source: EuroLeague Women
