= Angloma =

Angloma is a surname. Notable people with the surname include:

- Jocelyn Angloma (born 1965), French football manager
- Nell Angloma (born 2006), French basketball player
