= Zeynep Şevval Gül =

Turkish basketball player

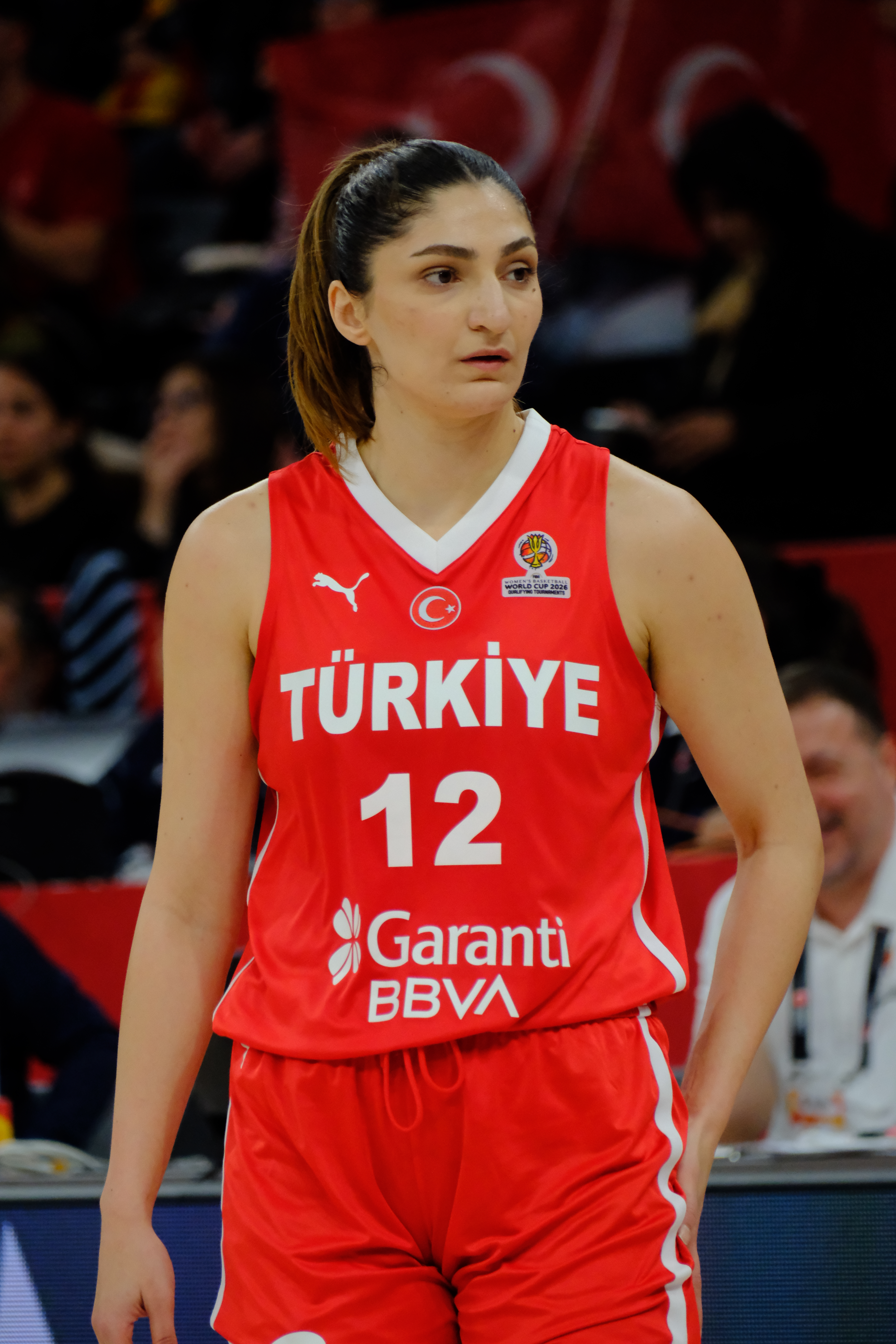
- Zeynep Şevval Gül in 2026

No. 12 – Fenerbahçe
- Position: Power forward
- League: Turkish Super League; EuroLeague Women

Personal information
- Born: 1 January 2001 (age 25) Malatya, Turkey
- Listed height: 1.93 m (6 ft 4 in)

Career information
- College: Arizona (2019–2020); Saint Louis (2020–2023)
- Playing career: 2015–present

Career history
- 2015–2017: Fenerbahçe Academy
- 2017–2019: Fenerbahçe
- 2023–2024: Emlak Konut
- 2024–2025: OGM Ormanspor
- 2025–2026: Galatasaray
- 2026–present: Fenerbahçe

Career highlights
- FIBA Europe SuperCup Women champion (2026); 2× Turkish Basketball Super League champion (2017–18, 2018–19); Turkish Cup winner (2018–19)

Zeynep Şevval Gül

Zeynep Şevval Gül (born 1 January 2001) is a Turkish female basketball player for Turkish Super League and EuroLeague Women giant Fenerbahçe. The 1.93 m (6 ft 4 in) tall national plays Power forward.

== Club career ==
She started her career with Fenerbahçe Academy and also been professionall with Fenerbahçe in 2017. After playing professional basketball at Fenerbahçe between 2017–2019 and won two national championship and one national cup, she went to USA for education at the Arizona University. After her education, she came back to Turkey and played for Emlak Konut (2023–2025), OGM Ormanspor (2024–2025) and Galatasaray (2025–2026).

On 10 September 2026, he signed with Fenerbahçe where she started her career.

== Collage ==
She played collage basketball at Arizona Wildcats in 2019-2020 season and for Saint Louis Billikens between 2020-2023.

== Honours ==
Fenerbahçe

- (European Union) FIBA Europe SuperCup Women: 2026
- (Turkey) Turkish Basketball Super League (2): 2017–18, 2018–19
- (Turkey) Turkish Cup: 2018–19
