= 2018–19 Women's Basketball Super League =

Women's Basketball Super League
- Season: 2018–19
- Dates: October 2018 – May 2019
- Games played: 182 + Playoff games
- Teams: 14
- TV partner: Tivibu

Regular season
- Relegated: Bodrum Basketbol; İstanbul Üniversitesi

Finals
- Champions: Fenerbahçe
- Runners-up: Çukurova Basketbol
- Semifinalists: BOTAŞ; Galatasaray
- Finals MVP: (Turkey) Birsel Vardarlı

Statistical leaders
Points	(United States) Kelsey Mitchell	25.99
Rebounds	(Turkey) Kiah Stokes	11.85
Assists	(Turkey) Asena Yalçın	7.97
Efficiency	(Lithuania) Gintarė Petronytė	26.14

Records
- Biggest home win: Çukurova 158–63 Canik (March 23, 2019)
- Biggest away win: Bodrum 58–140 Çukurova (February 9, 2019)
- Highest scoring: İzmit 137–86 Canik (March 9, 2019)

Seasons
- ← 2017–18 2019–20 →

The 2018–19 Women's Basketball Super League (Turkish: Kadınlar Basketbol Süper Ligi) was the 39th edition of the top-tier level professional women's basketball league in Turkey. Fenerbahçe were the defending champions.

== Regular season ==
=== Standings ===
Pos	Team	Pld	W	L	PF	PA	PD	Pts	Qualification or relegation
1	Çukurova Basketbol	26	23	3	2354	1711	+643	49	Qualification to playoffs
2	Fenerbahçe	26	22	4	2174	1609	+565	48	Qualification to playoffs
3	Hatay Büyükşehir Belediyespor	26	20	6	2052	1765	+287	46	Qualification to playoffs
4	Botaş	26	18	8	1920	1625	+295	44	Qualification to playoffs
5	Mersin Büyükşehir Belediyespor	26	18	8	2166	1808	+358	44	Qualification to playoffs
6	Galatasaray	26	17	9	1915	1779	+136	43	Qualification to playoffs
7	Beşiktaş	26	16	10	2140	1906	+234	42	Qualification to playoffs
8	Ormanspor	26	13	13	1975	1847	+128	39	Qualification to playoffs
9	İzmit Belediyespor	26	11	15	1957	2001	−44	37	
10	Kayseri Basketbol	26	8	18	1841	2007	−166	34	
11	Adana Basketbol	26	8	18	1938	2258	−320	34	
12	Samsun Canik Belediyespor	26	6	20	1799	2442	−643	32	
13	İstanbul Üniversitesi	26	1	25	1569	2128	−559	27	Relegation to TKBL
14	Bodrum Basketbol	26	1	25	1455	2369	−914	27	Relegation to TKBL

Source: TBF

=== Results ===
Home \ Away	ÇUK	FEN	HAT	BOT	MBB	GAL	BJK	ORM	İZB	KAY	ABK	SCA	İÜN	BOD
Çukurova Basketbol	—	88–72	96–82	78–56	64–71	87–58	77–69	75–62	85–74	97–66	107–55	158–63	120–46	105–54
Fenerbahçe	81–65	—	100–65	83–70	81–56	77–60	68–57	79–62	94–66	89–63	102–65	90–62	81–46	106–38
Hatay BB	68–73	72–67	—	83–63	60–64	85–70	88–72	73–70	86–72	82–68	103–49	104–69	80–49	97–54
Botaş	69–70	46–62	71–72	—	86–66	60–68	70–69	71–64	76–53	78–60	83–56	91–58	79–49	99–43
Mersin BB	70–80	93–83	58–65	61–75	—	82–70	92–75	79–80	90–74	89–64	89–72	90–70	90–59	101–37
Galatasaray	64–70	60–68	67–65	56–49	71–78	—	52–65	74–71	73–54	75–69	95–66	91–68	74–59	78–46
Beşiktaş	92–88	61–77	78–70	69–70	103–99	91–77	—	76–78	81–74	66–62	111–71	73–74	93–60	94–61
Ormanspor	64–71	73–90	64–72	64–68	73–69	52–58	66–88	—	87–74	91–96	84–74	94–55	95–53	88–38
İzmit Belediyespor	65–87	47–78	67–76	71–84	65–94	84–86	68–63	87–84	—	77–69	83–75	137–86	65–56	102–71
Kayseri Basketbol	69–73	58–76	65–67	72–86	74–89	62–65	77–79	57–68	60–79	—	95–87	106–81	80–76	81–56
Adana Basketbol	68–93	70–68	70–83	53–79	59–108	80–94	82–95	79–81	84–79	77–83	—	109–92	71–58	95–73
Canik Belediyespor	59–117	49–108	57–81	49–71	65–123	63–116	83–124	71–84	58–70	76–48	85–96	—	79–72	74–50
İstanbul Üniversitesi	56–90	58–89	63–83	48–81	56–80	75–80	64–94	63–88	57–80	70–72	69–78	66–76	—	75–61
Bodrum Basketbol	58–140	59–105	69–90	45–89	47–85	53–80	58–102	57–88	61–90	58–65	66–97	73–77	69–66	—

Source: TBF
Legend: Blue = home team win; Red = away team win.

== Playoffs ==
Quarterfinals
1	Çukurova Basketbol	101	75	X
8	Ormanspor	53	44	X
4	Botaş	51	74	64
5	Mersin BŞB	61	54	62
2	Fenerbahçe	105	81	X
7	Beşiktaş	80	67	X
3	Hatay BŞB	62	59	X
6	Galatasaray	63	70	X

Semifinals
1	Çukurova Basketbol	74	70	72	63	X
4	Botaş	50	46	82	57	X
2	Fenerbahçe	72	48	59	57	54
6	Galatasaray	51	59	74	49	51

Finals
1	Çukurova Basketbol	78	67	70	68	X
2	Fenerbahçe	71	69	88	80	X

== Turkish clubs in European competitions ==
Club	Competition	Progress
Fenerbahçe	EuroLeague	Quarterfinals
Hatay BŞB	EuroLeague	Regular season
Çukurova Basketbol	EuroLeague	Qualifying round
Çukurova Basketbol	EuroCup	Quarterfinals
Botaş	EuroCup	Play-off Round 1
Beşiktaş	EuroCup	Round of 16
Mersin BŞB	EuroCup	Regular season
Galatasaray	EuroCup	Round of 8
Ormanspor	EuroCup	Play-off Round 1
