= Ahmet Çakı =

Turkish basketball coach

Fenerbahçe
- Position: Head coach
- League: WBSL; EuroLeague Women

Personal information
- Born: June 22, 1975 (age 51) Mersin, Turkey

Career history

Coaching
- 1995: Mersin Türkmenspor
- 1997–2004: Darüşşafaka (assistant)
- 2004–2006: Darüşşafaka
- 2007–2008: Mersin Büyükşehir Belediyesi
- 2008–2009: Turkey (assistant)
- 2008: Air Avellino (assistant)
- 2008–2012: Erdemirspor
- 2012–2014: Tofaş
- 2014–2016: Anadolu Efes (assistant)
- 2016: Anadolu Efes
- 2016–2017: Alba Berlin
- 2018: Darüşşafaka
- 2021–2022: Tofaş
- 2023–2024: Çağdaş Bodrumspor
- 2025: Karşıyaka Basket
- 2025–2026: Bursaspor
- 2026–present: Fenerbahçe (women)

Career highlights
- FIBA Europe SuperCup Women champion (2026)

Ahmet Çakı (born June 22, 1975) is a Turkish professional basketball coach who is the head coach for Fenerbahçe of the Women's Basketball Super League (KBSL).

== Coaching career ==
On June 20, 2016, Çaki was appointed as head coach of Alba Berlin of the German Basketball Bundesliga.

On June 20, 2018, Çaki returned to Darüşşafaka for a second stint as the new head coach.

On November 26, 2021, he has signed with Tofaş of the Turkish Basketbol Süper Ligi (BSL).

On December 21, 2023, he signed with Çağdaş Bodrumspor of the Basketbol Süper Ligi (BSL).

On April 27, 2024, Çağdaş Bodrumspor finished the 2023-2024 season 15th place and relegated to second division league with Çaki.

On March 28, 2025, he signed with Karşıyaka Basket of the Basketbol Süper Ligi (BSL).

On November 11, 2025, he signed with Bursaspor of the Basketbol Süper Ligi (BSL).
