= 2026 FIBA Europe SuperCup Women =

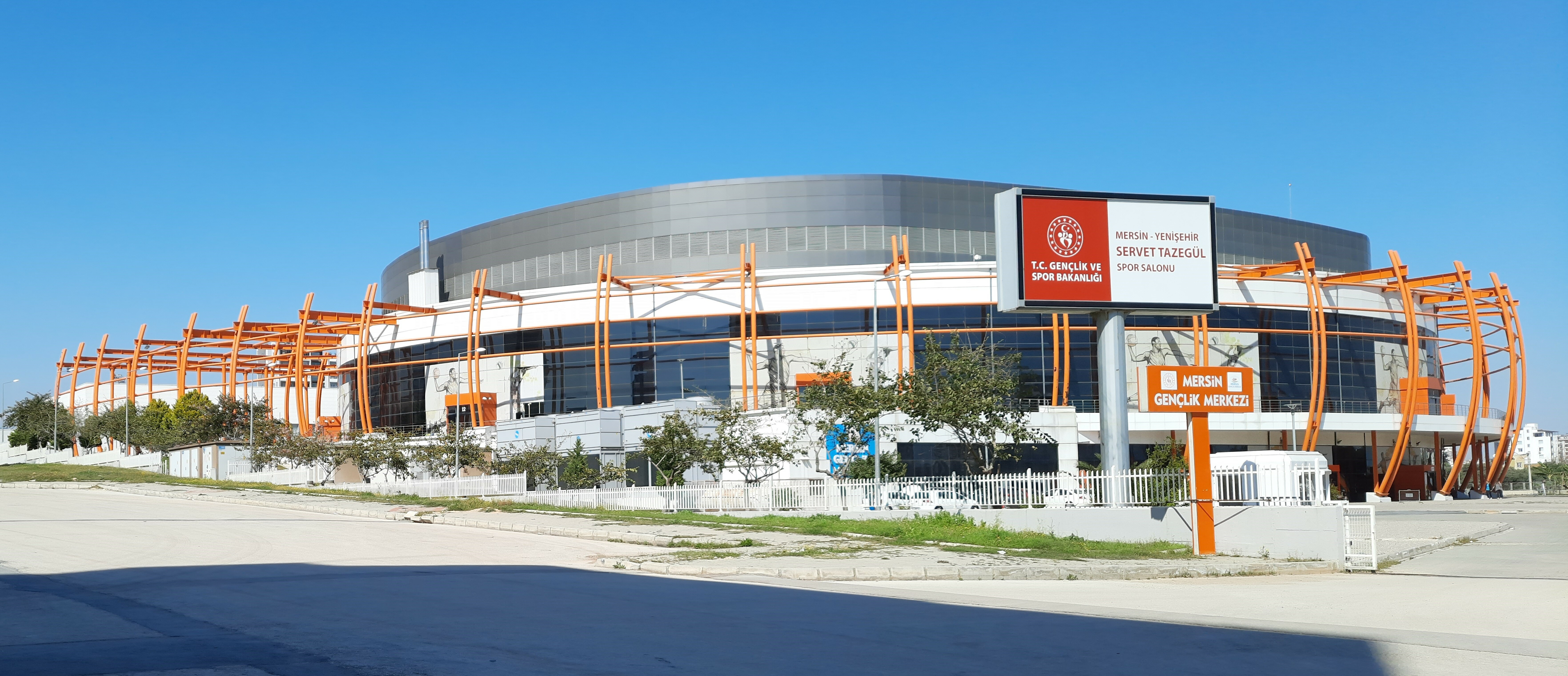
- Servet Tazegül Arena in Mersin, Turkey hosted the SuperCup

Tournament details
- Arena: Servet Tazegül Arena; Mersin, Turkey
- Dates: 7 October 2026

Final positions
- Champions: (Turkish Basketball Federation) Fenerbahçe (3rd title)
- Runners-up: (Turkish Basketball Federation) ÇBK Mersin

Awards and statistics
- MVP: (Basketball Belgium) Emma Meesseman
- Top scorer(s): (French Federation of Basketball) Carla Leite (17 pts)
- Attendance: 8,000

The 2026 FIBA Europe SuperCup Women was the 15th edition of the FIBA Europe SuperCup Women. It was held on 7 October 2026, in Mersin, Turkey between ÇBK Mersin and Fenerbahçe. Fenerbahçe won their third SuperCup with a win over ÇBK Mersin.

== Teams ==
The game was an all Turkish encounter between ÇBK Mersin and Fenerbahçe.

| Team | Qualification | Previous participation (bold indicates winners) |
|---|---|---|
| (Turkey) ÇBK Mersin | Winners of the 2025–26 EuroCup Women | None |
| (Turkey) Fenerbahçe | Winners of the 2025–26 EuroLeague Women | 2 (**2023**, **2024**) |

== Venue ==
The Servet Tazegül Arena in Mersin, Turkey hosted the match.

| Mersin | 2026 FIBA Europe SuperCup Women (Turkey) |
| Servet Tazegül Arena | 2026 FIBA Europe SuperCup Women (Turkey) |
| Capacity: 7,500 | 2026 FIBA Europe SuperCup Women (Turkey) |

== Final ==
| 7 October 2026 | ÇBK Mersin (Turkish Basketball Federation) | 71–**79** | (Turkish Basketball Federation) **Fenerbahçe** | Mersin, Turkey |
| 19:30 (TRT) | Scoring by quarter: **21**–19, 11–**19**, 16–**21**, **23**–20 |
| | Pts: Leite 17; Rebs: Iagupova, Diaby 8 Asts: Leite 5 PIR: Leite 18 | Boxscore | Pts: Çakır 16; Rebs: Meesseman 8 Asts: Meesseman 7 PIR: Meesseman 26 | Arena: Servet Tazegül Arena; Attendance: 8,000; Referees: Viola Györgyi (NOR), Nataša Dragojević (MNE), Milita Stalaucinskaitė (LTU) |

| Starters: | | | Pts | Reb | Ast |
|---|---|---|---|---|---|
| PG | 3 | (Cameroon) Jessica Thomas | 10 | 5 | 4 |
| SG | 0 | (France) Carla Leite | 17 | 3 | 5 |
| SF | 23 | (Ukraine) Alina Iagupova | 4 | 8 | 4 |
| PF | 22 | (Turkey) Kennedy Burke | 14 | 4 | 1 |
| C | 29 | (Ivory Coast) Kariata Diaby | 12 | 8 | 0 |
| Reserves: | | | | | |
| PF | 5 | (Turkey) Ayşenaz Harma | DNP | | |
| PG | 6 | (Turkey) Büşra Akbaş | 2 | 1 | 1 |
| SF | 10 | (Turkey) Sinem Ataş | 0 | 0 | 0 |
| SF | 14 | (Turkey) Azra Erçelik | DNP | | |
| C | 33 | (Turkey) Esra Ural | 0 | 1 | 0 |
| SG | 35 | (Turkey) Eslem Güler | DNP | | |
| SG | 44 | (United Kingdom) Karlie Samuelson | 12 | 4 | 0 |
Head coach:
(Turkish Basketball Federation) Ceyhun Yıldızoğlu

| **Mersin** | **Fenerbahçe** |

| Mersin | Statistics | Fenerbahçe |
|---|---|---|
| 14/32 (43.8%) | 2-pt field goals | 25/39 (64.1%) |
| 7/30 (23.3%) | 3-pt field goals | 6/19 (31.6%) |
| 22/28 (78.6%) | Free throws | 11/15 (73.3%) |
| 12 | Offensive rebounds | 3 |
| 26 | Defensive rebounds | 32 |
| 38 | Total rebounds | 35 |
| 15 | Assists | 23 |
| 14 | Turnovers | 16 |
| 7 | Steals | 5 |
| 0 | Blocks | 1 |
| 15 | Fouls | 24 |

2026 FIBA Europe SuperCup Women winner

Fenerbahçe
3rd SuperCup Women title

| Starters: | | | Pts | Reb | Ast |
|---|---|---|---|---|---|
| PG | 1 | (Serbia) Yvonne Anderson | 6 | 3 | 2 |
| SG | 32 | (France) Tima Pouye | 6 | 1 | 1 |
| SF | 71 | (France) Leïla Lacan | 10 | 1 | 3 |
| PF | 11 | (Belgium) Emma Meesseman | 14 | 8 | 7 |
| C | 15 | (Germany) Luisa Geiselsöder | 9 | 7 | 2 |
| Reserves: | | | | | |
| SF | 2 | (Lithuania) Laura Juškaitė | 0 | 1 | 0 |
| PG | 4 | (Turkey) Olcay Çakır | 16 | 1 | 2 |
| PG | 10 | (Turkey) Alperi Onar | 10 | 1 | 0 |
| C | 12 | (Turkey) Zeynep Şevval Gül | 0 | 0 | 1 |
| PG | 22 | (Belgium) Julie Allemand | 2 | 3 | 4 |
| SG | 33 | (France) Nell Angloma | 6 | 2 | 0 |
| C | 51 | (United States) Lauren Betts | 0 | 6 | 1 |
Head coach:
(Turkish Basketball Federation) Ahmet Çakı

== See also ==
- 2026–27 EuroLeague Women
- 2026–27 EuroCup Women
- 2026–27 EuroLeague Women regular season
- 2026–27 EuroLeague Women qualification round
- 2026–27 EuroCup Women qualification round
- 2026–27 EuroCup Women knockout stage
