= Tima Pouye =

French basketball player (born 1999)

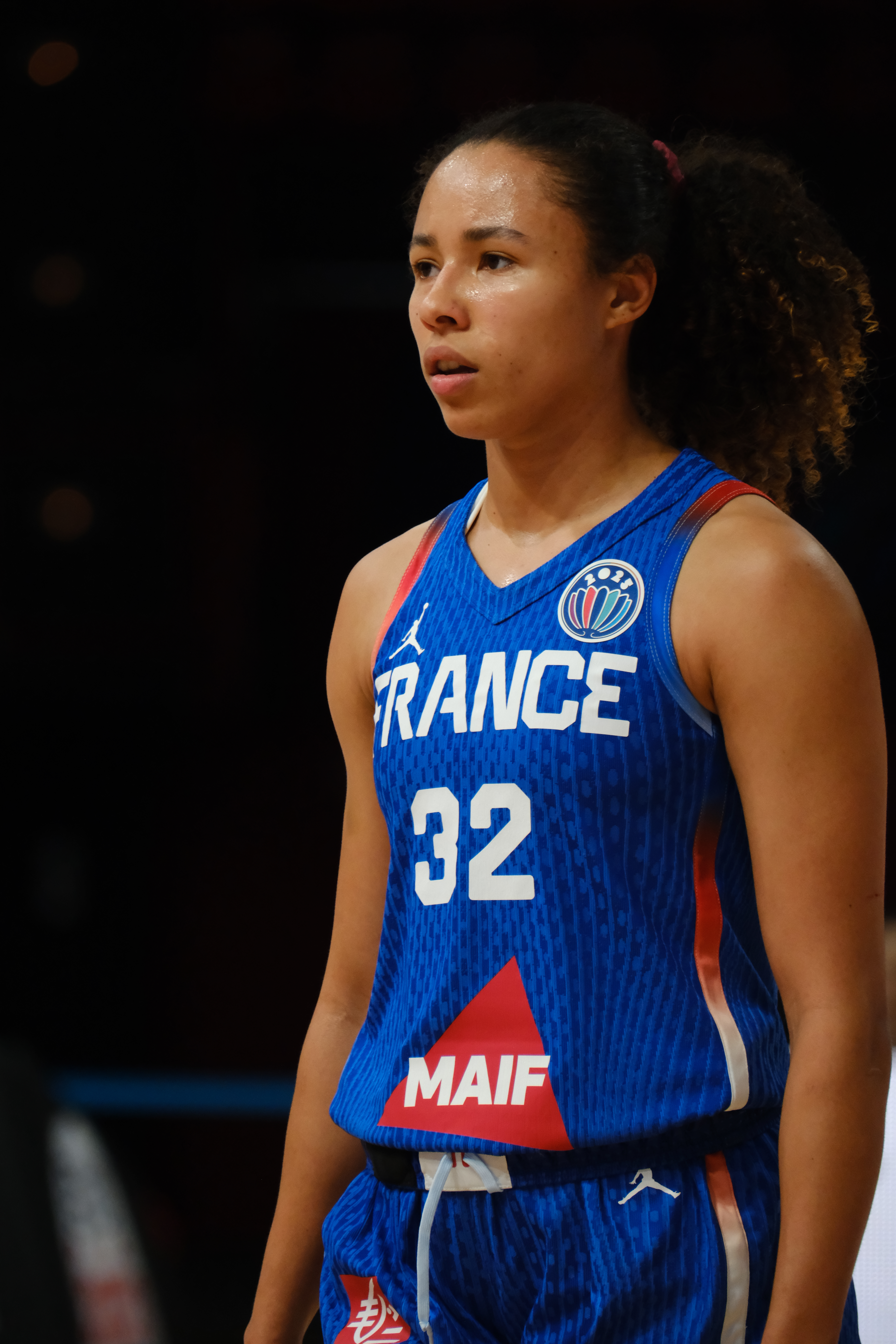
- Pouye in 2025

No. 32 – Fenerbahçe
- Position: Shooting guard
- League: Turkish Super League; EuroLeague Women

Personal information
- Born: 7 April 1999 (age 27) Tulle, France
- Listed height: 5 ft 9 in (1.75 m)

Career history
- 2017–2020: Tarbes Gespe Bigorre
- 2020–2022: Flammes Carolo Basket
- 2022–2023: Roche Vendée
- 2023–2026: Tango Bourges Basket
- 2026: Toronto Tempo
- 2026–present: Fenerbahçe

Career highlights
- FIBA Europe SuperCup Women champion (2026)
- Stats at Basketball Reference

Tima Pouye

Tima Pouye (born April 7, 1999) is a French basketball player for Fenerbahçe of the Turkish Super League.

== Professional career ==
Pouye signed her first professional contract with Tarbes GB, where head coach François Gomez quickly entrusted her with significant responsibilities. After reaching the French championship finals in her debut season and competing in the EuroCup the following year, she established herself in the Ligue Féminine de Basketball during her third season, averaging 14.4 points, 5.2 rebounds and 2.4 assists per game. Her performances led to her transfer to Flammes Carolo, with whom she continued to compete in the EuroCup..

On May 28, 2026, Pouye signed a contract with the Toronto Tempo in the WNBA. On July 31, she was waived to make room for Aneesah Morrow.

On September 10, 2026, Pouye joined the Turkish powerhouse Fenerbahçe.

== National team career ==
Pouye represented France at several youth international levels, winning the gold medal at the 2016 FIBA U18 Women's European Championship, a bronze medal at the 2017 FIBA U18 Women's European Championship, and another bronze medal at the 2019 FIBA U20 Women's European Championship.

She represented France at the EuroBasket Women 2025.
