= Olcay Çakır =

Turkish basketball player

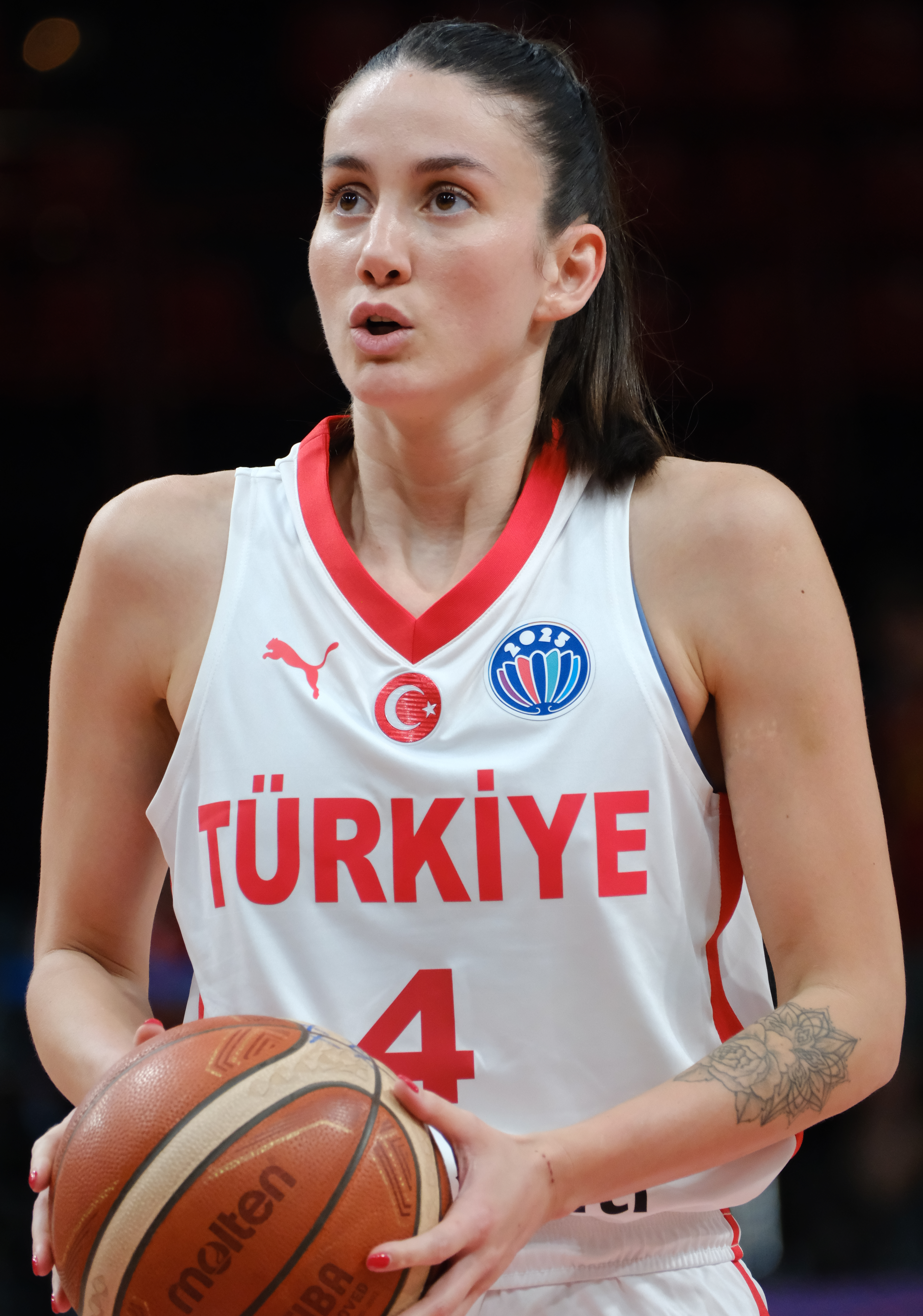

No. 4 – Fenerbahçe
- Position: Point guard
- League: Turkish Super League; EuroLeague Women

Personal information
- Born: 13 July 1993 (age 33) Konak, İzmir, Turkey
- Listed height: 5 ft 11 in (1.80 m)
- Listed weight: 132 lb (60 kg)

Career information
- WNBA draft: 2013: 3rd round, 27th overall pick
- Drafted by: New York Liberty
- Playing career: 2010–present

Career history
- 2010–2016: Fenerbahçe
- 2016–2018: Yakın Doğu Üniversitesi
- 2018–2019: Botaş
- 2019–2023: Fenerbahçe
- 2023–2024: CB Avenida
- 2024–present: Fenerbahçe

Career highlights
- 2× EuroLeague champion (2023, 2026); 2× FIBA Europe SuperCup Women champion (2024, 2026); EuroCup Women champion (2017); 10× Turkish Super League champion (2011, 2012, 2013, 2016, 2017, 2021, 2022, 2023, 2025, 2026); 9× Turkish Presidential Cup champion (2010, 2012, 2013, 2014, 2015, 2017, 2019, 2024, 2025); 6× Turkish Cup champion (2015, 2016, 2017, 2018, 2020, 2026)
- Stats at Basketball Reference

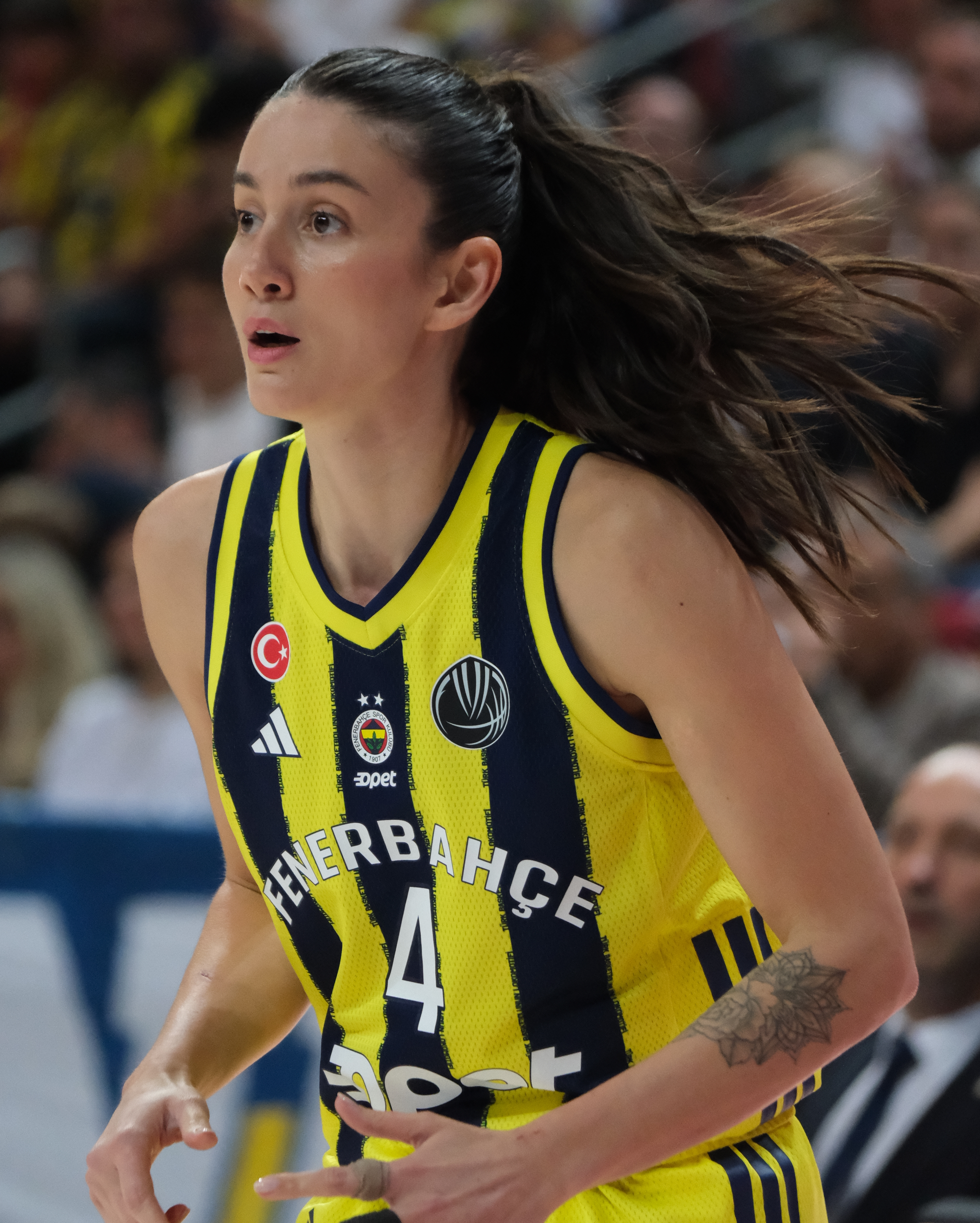

Olcay Çakır Turgut (born 13 July 1993) is a Turkish basketball player for Fenerbahçe of the Turkish Super League.

Çakır was selected 27th overall in the third round of the 2013 WNBA draft by the New York Liberty. She was the first player from Turkey to be drafted into the WNBA.

== Honors ==
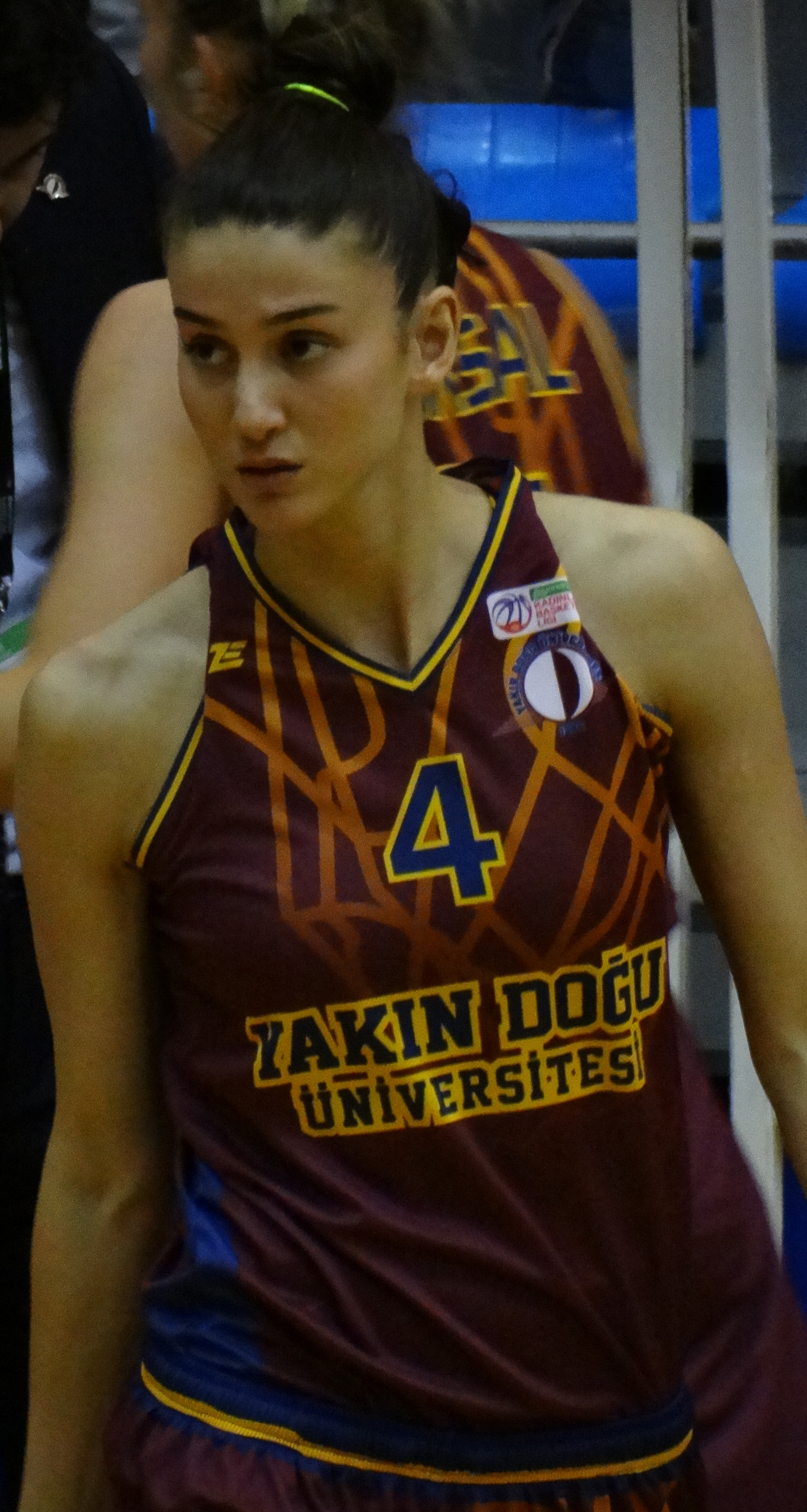
Çakır with Yakın Doğu Üniversitesi in 2018

=== Individual ===
- 2012 FIBA Europe Under-20 Championship for Women – All Tournament Team member

=== Club ===
- 2× EuroLeague Women champion (2023, 2026)
- EuroLeague Women runners-up (2013, 2014, 2022)
- EuroCup Women champion (2017)
- 2× FIBA Europe SuperCup Women champion (2024, 2026)
- FIBA Europe SuperCup Women runners-up (2017)
- 10× Turkish Women's Basketball League champion (2011, 2012, 2013, 2016, 2017, 2021, 2022, 2023, 2025, 2026)
- 2× Turkish Women's Basketball League runners-up (2014, 2018)
- 6× Turkish Women's Basketball Cup champion (2015, 2016, 2017, 2018, 2020, 2026)
- 4× Turkish Women's Basketball Cup runners-up (2012, 2013, 2014, 2019)
- 9× Turkish Women's Basketball Presidential Cup champion (2010, 2012, 2013, 2014, 2015, 2017, 2019, 2024, 2025)
- Turkish Women's Basketball Presidential Cup runners-up (2011)
- Liga Femenina de Baloncesto runners-up (2024)

=== National team ===
- 2012 FIBA Europe Under-20 Championship for Women – Bronze
- 2013 FIBA Europe Under-20 Championship for Women – Bronze

== See also ==
- Turkish women in sports
