= Meltem Avcı =

Turkish basketball player

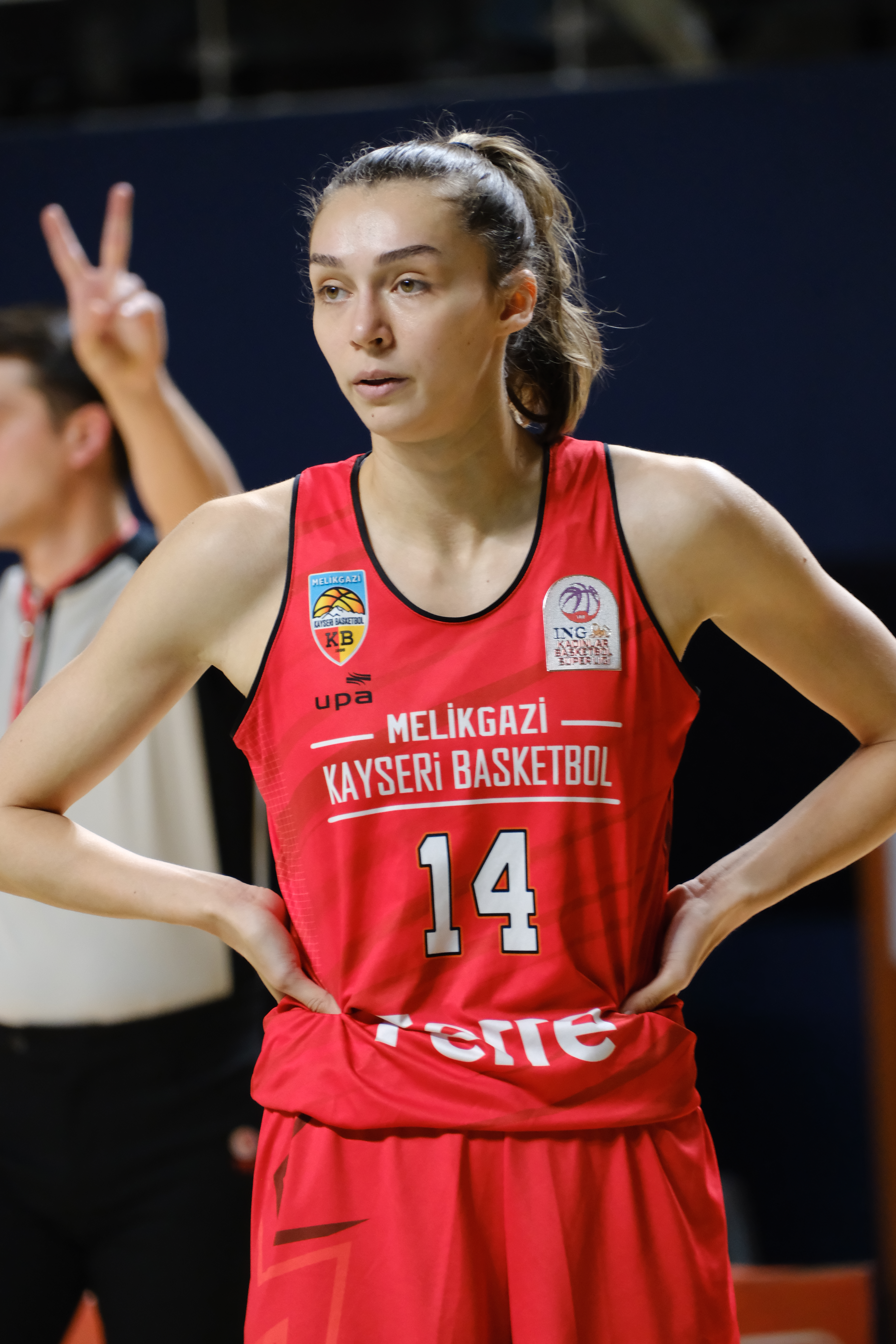

Personal information
- Born: 30 January 1997 (age 29) Balıkesir, Turkey
- Listed height: 6 ft 2 in (1.88 m)

Career information
- Playing career: 2014–present
- Position: Power forward

Career history
- 2014–2018: Beşiktaş
- 2018–2020: Çukurova Basketbol
- 2020–2022: OGM Ormanspor
- 2022–2023: Botaş
- 2023–2024: Çukurova Basketbol
- 2024–2025: Kayseri Basketbol
- 2025–2026: Fenerbahçe

Career highlights
- EuroLeague champion (2026); Turkish Super League champion (2026); Turkish Cup champion (2026)

Meltem Avcı Yılmaz (born 30 January 1997) is a Turkish basketball player.

== Professional career ==
=== Beşiktaş ===
She started her professional basketball career in Beşiktaş in 2014.

=== Fenerbahçe ===
On 16 December 2025, Avcı signed with Fenerbahçe until the end of the season.

== Honours ==
- EuroLeague Women
  - Championship (1) 2026
- Turkish Super League
  - Championship (1) 2025–26
- Turkish Cup
  - Championship (1) 2026

== Personal life ==
She is married to fellow professional basketball player Erkan Yılmaz.
