= Nell Angloma =

French basketball player (born 2006)

- Angloma with Fenerbahçe in 2026

No. 33 – Houston Comets
- Position: Forward
- League: WNBA

Personal information
- Born: 12 June 2006 (age 20) Evreux, France
- Listed height: 6 ft 1 in (1.85 m)

Career information
- WNBA draft: 2026: 1st round, 12th overall pick
- Drafted by: Connecticut Sun
- Playing career: 2024–present

Career history
- 2024–2026: Basket Lattes
- 2026: Connecticut Sun
- 2026–present: Fenerbahçe
- 2027–present: Houston Comets

Career highlights
- FIBA Europe SuperCup Women champion (2026)
- Stats at Basketball Reference
Medals
Women's basketball
Representing France
FIBA Under-17 World Cup
Bronze medal – third place	2022 Hungary	Team

Nell Angloma (born 12 June 2006) is a French professional basketball player for the Houston Comets of the Women's National Basketball Association (WNBA) and Fenerbahçe of the Turkish Super League.

== Playing career ==
Angloma played basketball for three years at INSEP. In June 2024, she signed a three-year contract with Basket Lattes Montpellier Agglomération. During the 2024–25 season, in her first season with the club, she averaged 5.8 points, 3.6 rebounds, and 1.0 assists per game.

On 15 December 2025, against Angers, she scored a career-high 31 points, on 9-for-11 shooting from the field, including two made three-pointers. She was subsequently named the Hoops Agents Player of the Week for round 10. During the 2025–26 season, she averaged 15.5 points and 5.7 rebounds and 2.5 assists per game prior to the 2026 WNBA draft. She ranked second in the league in scoring, behind Angers' Anna Ngo Ndjock, and led the league in efficiency rating.

On 13 April 2026, she was drafted in the first round, 12th overall, by the Connecticut Sun in the 2026 WNBA draft.

On 10 September 2026, she joined Fenerbahçe of the Women's Basketball Super League.

== National team career ==
Angloma made her international debut for France at the 2022 FIBA Under-17 Women's Basketball World Cup. During the tournament she averaged 4.9 points, 3.9 rebounds and 1.4 assists per game and won a bronze medal.

She represented France at the 2024 FIBA U18 Women's EuroBasket where she averaged 14.1 point, 7.3 rebounds and 2.9 assists per game and won the FIBA U18 Women's EuroBasket championship. She was subsequently named MVP and to the All-Tournament Team.

She represented France at the 2025 FIBA Under-19 Women's Basketball World Cup where she led the team in scoring and averaged 17.0 points, 5.5 rebounds, and 2.8 assists per game and finished in fifth place. She was subsequently named to the FIBA U19 World Cup All-Second Team.
