= Luisa Geiselsöder =

German basketball player

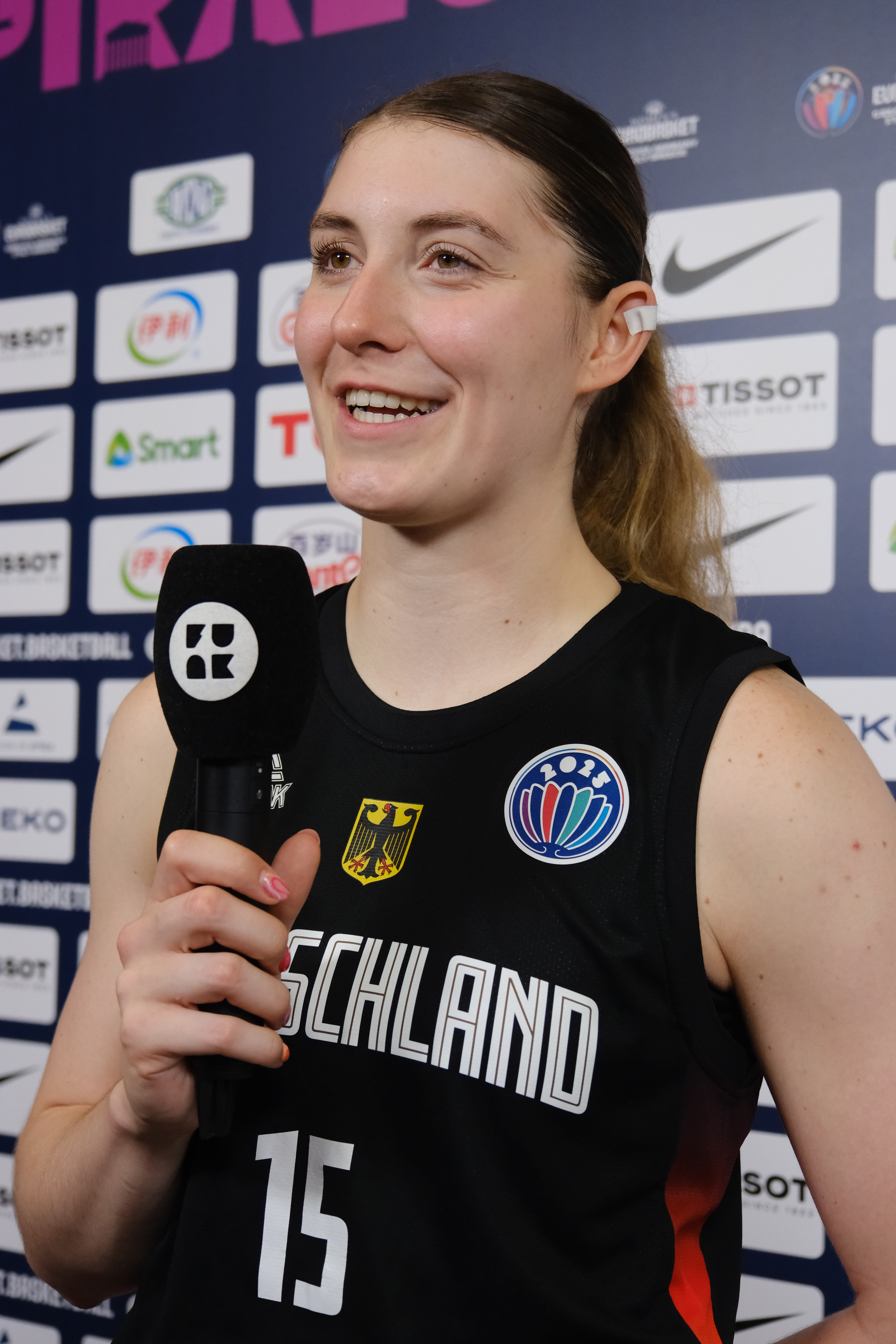
- Geiselsöder in 2025

No. 15 – Fenerbahçe
- Position: Center
- League: Turkish Super League; EuroLeague Women

Personal information
- Born: 10 February 2000 (age 26) Ansbach, Germany
- Listed height: 6 ft 4 in (1.93 m)
- Listed weight: 204 lb (93 kg)

Career information
- WNBA draft: 2020: 2nd round, 21st overall pick
- Drafted by: Dallas Wings
- Playing career: 2015–present

Career history
- 2015–2020: BG Donau-Ries
- 2020–2022: Landerneau
- 2022–2023: Roche Vendee
- 2023–2025: Basket Landes
- 2025: Dallas Wings
- 2025–2026: ÇBK Mersin
- 2026–present: Portland Fire
- 2026–present: Fenerbahçe

Career highlights
- EuroCup champion (2026); FIBA Europe SuperCup Women champion (2026); FIBA U16 Women's European Championship MVP (2016)
- Stats at Basketball Reference
Medals
Representing Germany
Women's basketball
FIBA U16 Women's European Championship
Silver medal – second place	2016 Italy	national team
FIBA U-18 European Championship
Gold medal – first place	2018 Italy	national team

Luisa Christine Geiselsöder (born 10 February 2000) is a German professional basketball player for the Portland Fire of the Women's National Basketball Association (WNBA) and Fenerbahçe of the Turkish Super League. She was selected 21st overall in the 2020 WNBA draft by the Wings.

== Professional career ==
In 2015, Geiselsöder started her career with BG Donau-Ries. In the 2019–20 season, she averaged 18.6 points, 2.3 rebounds and 1.4 assists per game.

In May 2025, Geiselsöder was a member of the Basket Landes team that won the French Ligue Féminine de Basketball Championship.

On September 10, 2026, Geiselsöder joined the Turkish powerhouse Fenerbahçe.

=== WNBA ===
On 17 April 2020, the Dallas Wings selected Geiselsöder as the 21st pick in the 2020 WNBA draft. On 12 March 2021, Geiselsöder signed a training camp contract with the Wings. However, she did not make it to the camp due to an injury and her contract was suspended. In January 2022, she was waived by the Wings.

On 2 February 2025, Geiselsöder once again signed a training camp contract with the Wings.

On 18 May 2025, Geiselsöder reported to College Park Center at UT Arlington, the current home of the Dallas Wings. She made her debut for the Wings on 27 May 2025, scoring a basket against the Connecticut Sun. Geiselsöder set a new career-high on June 13th, scoring 13 points on 6/6 shooting in a loss to the Las Vegas Aces. She left the team temporarily (missing their next game against the Golden State Valkyries) to represent Germany in the upcoming FIBA Women’s EuroBasket tournament through June 28th. On August 27, Geiselsöder suffered a right shoulder injury during the 101-95 loss to the Sun. The injury kept her out of the Wings' next two games and, later, the team confirmed that she would be out for the remainder of the season. Geiselsöder appeared in 28 games, averaging 6.9 points and 4.8 rebounds per game. She led the Wings in rebounding six times and is one of three rookies to rank in the top nine in steals, blocks, field goal percentage, and rebounds.

On 3 April 2026, she was drafted fifth overall by the Portland Fire in the 2026 WNBA expansion draft.

== National team career ==
=== Junior teams ===
Geiselsöder won the silver medal with the German national under-16 basketball team and was named the MVP at the 2016 FIBA Under-16 European Championship where she averaged 14.7 points, 8.9 rebounds and 1.6 assists per game. She also participated at the 2018 FIBA Under-18 European Championship where she won the gold medal and averaged 11.3 points, 6.3 rebounds and 1.4 assists per game. She played at the 2019 FIBA Under-20 European Championship, she averaged 12.6 points, 6.9 rebounds and 1.3 assists per game. She also participated at the 2019 FIBA Under-19 Basketball World Cup where she averaged 13.9 points, 6.9 rebounds and 1.3 assists per game.

=== Senior team ===
In mid-November 2019, she made her debut in the German national basketball team.

== Career statistics ==
Legend
GP	Games played	GS	Games started	MPG	Minutes per game	RPG	Rebounds per game
APG	Assists per game	SPG	Steals per game	BPG	Blocks per game	PPG	Points per game
TO	Turnovers per game	FG%	Field-goal percentage	3P%	3-point field-goal percentage	FT%	Free-throw percentage
**Bold**	Career best	°	League leader

=== WNBA ===
==== Regular season ====
Stats current through end of 2025 season

WNBA regular season statistics
Year	Team	GP	GS	MPG	FG%	3P%	FT%	RPG	APG	SPG	BPG	TO	PPG
2025	Dallas	28	24	22.4	.425	.330	.818	4.8	1.6	0.8	0.7	1.0	6.9
**Career**	1 year, 1 team	28	24	22.4	.425	.330	.818	4.8	1.6	0.8	0.7	1.0	6.9

== Personal life ==
Geiselsöder's elder sister Laura is a professional basketball player in Germany.
