= 2017–18 Women's Basketball Super League =

Women's Basketball Super League
- Season: 2017–18
- Dates: Regular season: 7 October 2017 – 14 April 2018; Play Offs: 24 April – 21 May 2018
- Teams: 14

Regular season
- Relegated: Adana ASKİ SK; Bornova Beckerspor

Finals
- Champions: Fenerbahçe (13th title)
- Runners-up: Yakın Doğu Üniversitesi

The 2017–18 Women's Basketball Super League is the 38th season of the top division women's basketball league in Turkey since its establishment in 1980. It started in October 2017 with the first round of the regular season and ended in May 2018.

Yakın Doğu Üniversitesi are the defending champions.

Fenerbahçe won their thirteenth title after beating Yakın Doğu Üniversitesi in the finals.

== Format ==
Each team plays each other twice. The top eight teams qualify for the play offs. The quarterfinals are played as a best-of-three series while the finals and semifinals are played as a best-of-seven series.

== Regular season ==
=== League table ===
Pos	Team	Pld	W	L	PF	PA	PD	Pts	Qualification or relegation
1	Yakın Doğu Üniversitesi	24	22	2	1920	1511	+409	46	Advance to Playoffs
2	Hatay BŞB	24	20	4	1913	1666	+247	44	Advance to Playoffs
3	Fenerbahçe	24	19	5	1808	1591	+217	43	Advance to Playoffs
4	Botaş	24	15	9	1654	1581	+73	39	Advance to Playoffs
5	Çukurova Basketbol	24	14	10	1762	1729	+33	38	Advance to Playoffs
6	Beşiktaş	24	13	11	1708	1666	+42	37	Advance to Playoffs
7	Mersin BŞB	24	13	11	1798	1708	+90	37	Advance to Playoffs
8	Galatasaray	24	11	13	1767	1700	+67	35	Advance to Playoffs
9	Ormanspor	24	9	15	1694	1834	−140	33	
10	Bellona AGÜ	24	8	16	1527	1724	−197	32	
11	Samsun Canik	24	6	18	1547	1759	−212	30	
12	İstanbul Üniversitesi	24	3	21	1606	1942	−336	27	
13	Adana ASKİ	24	3	21	1467	1760	−293	26	Relegation to TKBL
14	Bornova Beckerspor	0	0	0	0	0	0	0	Excluded

Source: KBSL

=== Results ===
Home \ Away	AGÜ	ASK	BJK	BOT	ÇUK	FEN	GAL	HAT	İÜN	MBB	ORM	SCA	YDÜ
Bellona AGÜ	—	67–70	64–50	66–76	78–81	57–71	72–71	71–82	69–63	40–79	56–70	74–63	72–84
Adana ASKİ	56–72	—	72–79	51–78	62–67	64–77	0–20	44–57	62–71	67–84	61–64	75–84	76–83
Beşiktaş	79–56	98–59	—	68–66	57–62	71–62	62–61	60–73	74–63	65–70	88–58	65–86	68–82
Botaş	54–56	77–57	59–48	—	71–70	78–69	79–72	58–67	66–50	87–80	84–79	67–51	48–51
Çukurova Basketbol	68–58	84–63	78–69	78–83	—	81–80	78–79	76–91	73–72	74–67	88–84	63–61	69–91
Fenerbahçe	78–60	76–55	82–65	86–56	78–73	—	75–68	86–84	75–63	73–78	83–65	76–51	66–65
Galatasaray	86–58	73–62	80–81	70–63	54–75	67–79	—	72–67	91–78	82–73	101–69	78–86	71–77
Hatay BŞB	82–61	81–72	74–71	67–52	67–56	77–72	84–82	—	95–71	87–76	100–70	90–82	65–68
İstanbul Üniversitesi	68–73	83–94	62–92	74–66	66–85	78–83	75–87	64–100	—	66–86	69–77	56–73	42–98
Mersin BŞB	74–68	76–63	75–82	63–71	73–66	55–64	87–77	69–81	72–78	—	84–77	102–62	56–58
Ormanspor	69–67	71–47	84–87	67–72	72–66	54–57	95–85	75–85	79–77	61–68	—	53–62	45–78
Samsun Canik	65–67	54–66	66–70	56–62	60–68	61–82	55–86	62–79	84–72	70–76	66–77	—	47–65
Yakın Doğu Üniversitesi	85–45	84–69	72–59	85–81	93–83	65–78	70–54	96–78	88–45	89–75	103–79	90–40	—

Source: KBSL
Legend: Blue = home team win; Red = away team win.

== Play-off ==
Quarterfinals
1	Yakın Doğu Üniversitesi	90	87
8	Galatasaray	53	81
4	Botaş	61	59
5	Çukurova Basketbol	67	61
2	Hatay BŞB	75	72
7	Mersin BŞB	78	64
3	Fenerbahçe	79	79
6	Beşiktaş	45	64

Semifinals
1	Yakın Doğu Üniversitesi	78	55	76	76
5	Çukurova Basketbol	76	59	64	66
2	Hatay BŞB	58	59	74
3	Fenerbahçe	73	68	77

Finals
1	Yakın Doğu Üniversitesi	76	69	68	53
3	Fenerbahçe	83	61	81	62
