= Laura Juškaitė =

Lithuanian basketball player (born 1997)

- Juškaitė with the Lithuania national team

No. 2 – Fenerbahçe
- Position: Small forward
- League: Turkish Super League; EuroLeague Women

Personal information
- Born: 22 September 1997 (age 29) Skuodas, Lithuania
- Listed height: 1.87 m (6 ft 2 in)
- Listed weight: 85 kg (187 lb)

Career information
- Playing career: 2012–present

Career history
- 2012–2015: Vilniaus Jaunieji talentai
- 2015–2018: Vilniaus Kibirkštis
- 2018–2020: AZS AJP Gorzów Wielkopolski
- 2020–2021: Valencia
- 2021–2022: Saint-Amand Hainaut Basket
- 2022–2023: Vilniaus Kibirkštis
- 2023–2024: Virtus Eirene Ragusa
- 2024: YTR Gayrimenkul Bodrum
- 2024–2025: BK Brno
- 2025–2026: Çukurova Basketbol
- 2026–present: Toronto Tempo
- 2026–present: Fenerbahçe

Career highlights
- 2× EuroCup champion (2021, 2026); FIBA Europe SuperCup Women champion (2026); LMKL All-Star; LMKL best youngest player (2015); LMKL MVP (2018)
- Stats at Basketball Reference

Laura Juškaitė (born 22 September 1997) is a Lithuanian professional basketball player for Toronto Tempo of the WNBA and Fenerbahçe of the Turkish Super League and EuroLeague Women. She also plays for the Lithuania women's national basketball team.

== Career ==
=== Europe ===
In 2012, Juškaitė started her career with Vilniaus Jaunieji talentai. In 2015, she signed a contract with Vilniaus Kibirkštis from LMKL. Her first club outside Lithuania was AZS AJP Gorzów Wielkopolski in Poland, where she played for two years. She won a silver medal in the 2018–19 season and bronze medal in 2019–20 season.

After two seasons in Poland, Juškaitė signed a contract with Valencia of the Liga Femenina de Baloncesto and EuroCup Women.

On 10 September 2026, Juškaitė joined the Turkish powerhouse Fenerbahçe.

=== Toronto Tempo (WNBA) ===
In April 2026, Juškaitė signed a training camp contract with the Toronto Tempo of the Women's National Basketball Association. In early May 2026, the Tempo extended the contract with Juškaitė beyond training camp.

On May 8, 2026, she made her debut for the Tempo, scoring six points, grabbing six rebounds, and recording one steal in a loss to the Washington Mystics. She became the third Lithuanian to play in the WNBA.

On Sept 20, 2026, she scored a career-high 28 points on 10-of-15 shooting in a loss to the New York Liberty.

== Career statistics ==
Legend
GP	Games played	GS	Games started	MPG	Minutes per game	RPG	Rebounds per game
APG	Assists per game	SPG	Steals per game	BPG	Blocks per game	PPG	Points per game
TO	Turnovers per game	FG%	Field-goal percentage	3P%	3-point field-goal percentage	FT%	Free-throw percentage
**Bold**	Career best	°	League leader

=== WNBA ===
WNBA regular season statistics
Year	Team	GP	GS	MPG	FG%	3P%	FT%	RPG	APG	SPG	BPG	TO	PPG
2026	Toronto	44°	36	25.4	.470	.319	.817	4.2	1.8	1.4	.3	2.1	11.3
**Career**	1 year, 1 team	44	36	25.4	.470	.319	.817	4.2	1.8	1.4	.3	2.1	11.3
