= 2024–25 EuroLeague Women regular season =

EuroLeague Women regular season
- Season: 2024–25
- Dates: 9 October 2024 – 28 January 2025
- Games played: 80
- Teams: 16 (from 8 countries)

The 2024–25 EuroLeague Women regular season was played between 9 October 2024 and 28 January 2025.

== Format ==
- First round

After the qualifiers, 16 teams will be split into 4 groups of four, where the top three from each group advances to the second round. The fourth place teams drop down to the EuroCup Women knockout stage. The advancing teams' records from the first round are carried over into the next round.

- Second round

The 12 remaining teams form 2 groups of six and will play the teams they have not played in the first round. In both groups, the top 2 will play the Semi-Final play-ins while 3rd and 4th play the Quarter-Final play-ins. The teams who finish fifth and sixth are eliminated.

== Draw ==
The seeding was announced on 15 July 2024. The draw took place in Munich, Germany on the 18 July 2024. Only a maximum of one club from the same country can be in the same regular season group.

Seed 1	Seed 2	Seed 3	Seed 4
(Turkey) Fenerbahçe Opet (Czech Republic) ZVVZ USK Praha (Turkey) CBK Mersin (Spain) Perfumerias Avenida	(Italy) Beretta Famila Schio (France) ESB Villeneuve-d'Ascq (France) Tango Bourges Basket (Spain) Valencia Basket	(Italy) Umana Reyer Venezia (Hungary) DVTK HUN-Therm (Poland) KGHM BC Polkowice (Greece) Olympiacos SFP	(Hungary) Uni Győr (N/A) Qualifier 1 (Note: The eventual team in this slot was Žabiny Brno.) (N/A) Qualifier 2 (Note: The eventual team in this slot was Casademont Zaragoza.) (N/A) Qualifier 3 (Note: The eventual team in this slot was Basket Landes.)

== First round ==
The schedule was announced on 2 September 2024.

All times are local.

=== Group A ===
Pos	Team	Pld	W	L	PF	PA	PD	Pts	Qualification	LAN	SCH	AVE	DVTK
1	(France) Basket Landes	6	4	2	360	372	−12	10 (Note: Basket Landes 128–123 Beretta Familia Schio)	Second round	—	68–59	59–58	55–54
2	(Italy) Beretta Famila Schio	6	4	2	428	382	+46	10	Second round	64–60	—	92–58	71–57
3	(Spain) Perfumerias Avenida	6	3	3	401	401	0	9	Second round	81–52	69–79	—	67–55
4	(Hungary) DVTK HUN-Therm	6	1	5	356	390	−34	7	EuroCup Women	56–66	70–63	64–68	—

Source: FIBA
Legend: Blue = home team win; Red = away team win.
Rules for classification: 1) Points; 2) Points difference; 3) Points scored.
Notes:

9 October 2024
19:30

Report

Basket Landes (France)	55–54	(Hungary) DVTK HUN-Therm
Scoring by quarter: 12–9, 16–9, 8–17, 19–19
Pts: Lacan 13; Rebs: Macquet 9 Asts: Lacan 4		Pts: Charles 15; Rebs: Charles 11; Asts: Lelik 8

Espace François Mitterrand, Mont-de-Marsan
Attendance: 2,500
Referees: Özlem Yalman (TUR), Vlad-Theodor Cotrobas-Dascalu (ROU), Sandra Sánchez González (ESP)

10 October 2024
20:15

Report

Beretta Famila Schio (Italy)	92–58	(Spain) Perfumerias Avenida
Scoring by quarter: 24–20, 23–15, 20–8, 25–15
Pts: Salaün 24; Rebs: Salaün 9 Asts: Sottana, Zanardi 6		Pts: 12 Fasoula; Rebs: 8 Martín Carrión; Asts: 3 Martín Carrión, Vilaró

Palazzetto Livio Romare, Schio
Attendance: 1,800
Referees: Cecília Montgomery-Tóth (HUN), Ivana Ivanovic (SRB), Jelena Tomic (CRO)

16 October 2024
20:00

Report

DVTK HUN-Therm (Hungary)	70–63	(Italy) Beretta Famila Schio
Scoring by quarter: 15–22, 14–10, 16–10, 25–21
Pts: Kanyasi, Jovanović 17; Rebs: Charles 9 Asts: three players 3		Pts: Salaün 19; Rebs: Salaün 9 Asts: three players 3

DVTK Arena, Miskolc
Attendance: 1,100
Referees: Veronika Obertova (SVK), Duhan Köyici (TUR), Veronika Vavrova (CZE)

17 October 2024
20:30

Report

Perfumerias Avenida (Spain)	81–52	(France) Basket Landes
Scoring by quarter: 23–9, 22–24, 15–11, 21–8
Pts: Koné, Carter 16; Rebs: Koné 13; Asts: Guirantes, Carter 4		Pts: Fuehring 13; Rebs: Djaldi-Tabdi, Bussiere 8 Asts: Slocum 4

Pabellón Municipal de Würzburg, Salamanca
Attendance: 2,352
Referees: Çisil Güngör (TUR), James Kerry Dominique (GIB), Emma Perry (IRL)

23 October 2024
20:00

Report

Beretta Famila Schio (Italy)	64–60	(France) Basket Landes
Scoring by quarter: 22–10, 12–12, 16–21, 14–17
Pts: three players 13; Rebs: Andre 8 Asts: Keys 6		Pts: Djaldi-Tabdi 19; Rebs: Djaldi-Tabdi 8 Asts: three players 3

Palazzetto Livio Romare, Schio
Attendance: 1,300
Referees: Viola Györgyi (NOR), Paulina Karolina Gajdosz (POL), Ioannis Agrafiotis (GRE)

24 October 2024
18:00

Report

DVTK HUN-Therm (Hungary)	64–68	(Spain) Perfumerias Avenida
Scoring by quarter: 16–18, 21–11, 11–24, 16–15
Pts: Lelik 18; Rebs: Charles 9 Asts: Charles 4		Pts: Gil 12; Rebs: Vilaró, Gil 5 Asts: Guirantes 6

DVTK Arena, Miskolc
Attendance: 1,200
Referees: Amal Dahra (FRA), Maria Ignatiou (CYP), Gilbert Hoxha (ALB)

30 October 2024
18:00

Report

DVTK HUN-Therm (Hungary)	56–66	(France) Basket Landes
Scoring by quarter: 17–21, 16–15, 13–17, 10–13
Pts: Kányási 17; Rebs: Charles 9 Asts: Kányási, Lelik 5		Pts: Lacan 13; Rebs: Geiselsöder 10; Asts: Pardon, Bussiere 3

DVTK Arena, Miskolc
Attendance: 1,200
Referees: Jelena Tomic (CRO), Çisil Güngör (TUR), Milita Stalaucinskaite (LTU)

30 October 2024
20:30

Report

Perfumerias Avenida (Spain)	69–79	(Italy) Beretta Famila Schio
Scoring by quarter: 22–25, 13–20, 15–6, 19–28
Pts: Carter, Fasoula 14; Rebs: three players 3 Asts: Carter 6		Pts: Laksa 14; Rebs: Andre, Keys 6 Asts: Keys 6

Pabellón Municipal de Würzburg, Salamanca
Attendance: 2,911
Referees: Özlem Yalman (TUR), Diogo Martins (POR), Josh Bowe (GBR)

20 November 2024
19:30

Report

Basket Landes (France)	59–58	(Spain) Perfumerias Avenida
Scoring by quarter: 25–14, 15–18, 15–17, 4–9
Pts: Geiselsöder 15; Rebs: Geiselsöder 8 Asts: Slocum 5		Pts: Gil 13; Rebs: Koné 8 Asts: Martín 6

Espace François Mitterrand, Mont-de-Marsan
Attendance: 2,600
Referees: Duhan Köyici (TUR), Veronika Obértová (SVK), Nikolaos Tziopanos (GRE)

21 November 2024
20:00

Report

Beretta Famila Schio (Italy)	71–57	(Hungary) DVTK HUN-Therm
Scoring by quarter: 16–23, 16–14, 15–9, 24–11
Pts: Laksa 21; Rebs: Andre 7 Asts: four players 3		Pts: Charles 15; Rebs: Charles 7 Asts: Lelik 5

Palazzetto Livio Romare, Schio
Attendance: 1,650
Referees: Amal Dahra (FRA), Nikola Perlic (CRO), Polat Parlak (TUR)

27 November 2024
19:30

Report

Basket Landes (France)	68–59	(Italy) Beretta Famila Schio
Scoring by quarter: 12–18, 17–16, 25–13, 14–12
Pts: Macquet, Geiselsöder 12; Rebs: Geiselsöder, Treffers 5 Asts: Pardon 8		Pts: Salaün 15; Rebs: Verona 9 Asts: Verona, Salaün 4

Espace François Mitterrand, Mont-de-Marsan
Attendance: 2,600
Referees: Viola Györgyi (NOR), Jelena Tomic (CRO), Paulina Karolina Gajdosz (POL)

27 November 2024
20:30

Report

Perfumerias Avenida (Spain)	67–55	(Hungary) DVTK HUN-Therm
Scoring by quarter: 15–10, 13–14, 12–15, 27–16
Pts: Carter 17; Rebs: Gil 6 Asts: Gil 4		Pts: Charles, Kányási 16; Rebs: Tadić, Gulbe 6 Asts: Miklós 4

Pabellón Municipal de Würzburg, Salamanca
Attendance: 2,915
Referees: Özlem Yalman (TUR), Veronika Vávrová (CZE), Çisil Güngör (TUR)

=== Group B ===
Pos	Team	Pld	W	L	PF	PA	PD	Pts	Qualification	MER	TAN	ZAB	OLY
1	(Turkey) CBK Mersin	6	6	0	477	386	+91	12	Second round	—	80–76	88–74	87–58
2	(France) Tango Bourges Basket	6	4	2	488	407	+81	10	Second round	66–77	—	91–70	82–62
3	(Czech Republic) Žabiny Brno	6	2	4	423	453	−30	8	Second round	45–64	65–85	—	92–61
4	(Greece) Olympiacos SFP	6	0	6	365	507	−142	6	EuroCup Women	67–81	53–88	64–77	—

Source: FIBA
Legend: Blue = home team win; Red = away team win.
Rules for classification: 1) Points; 2) Points difference; 3) Points scored.

8 October 2024
18:00

Report

Žabiny Brno (Czech Republic)	92–61	(Greece) Olympiacos SFP
Scoring by quarter: 22–19, 28–14, 24–16, 18–12
Pts: three players 17; Rebs: Kostowicz 10; Asts: Hamzová 8		Pts: Hempe 21; Rebs: Pilakouta 7 Asts: Lambert 5

Starez Arena Vodova, Brno
Attendance: 1,151
Referees: Alfred Jovović (CRO), Ewa Matuszewska (POL), Viktor Nagy (HUN)

9 October 2024
20:00

Report

Tango Bourges Basket (France)	66–77	(Turkey) CBK Mersin
Scoring by quarter: 22–25, 13–14, 11–20, 20–18
Pts: Astier 19; Rebs: Filip 6 Asts: Astier, Green 4		Pts: Rupert 20; Rebs: Rupert 9 Asts: Araujo, Anderson 4

Palais des sports du Prado, Bourges
Attendance: 3,300
Referees: Veronika Obertova (SVK), Yasmina Alcaraz (ESP), Josh Bowe (GBR)

16 October 2024
18:30

Report

CBK Mersin (Turkey)	88–74	(Czech Republic) Žabiny Brno
Scoring by quarter: 29–13, 24–25, 20–17, 15–19
Pts: Johannès 24; Rebs: Rupert 8 Asts: Fauthoux 7		Pts: Hamzová 22; Rebs: Cunane 13; Asts: Cunane 7

Servet Tazegül Spor Salonu, Mersin
Attendance: 2,500
Referees: Paulina Karolina Gajdosz (POL), Nataša Dragojević (MNE), Amalia Marchiş (ROU)

17 October 2024
18:30

Report

Olympiacos SFP (Greece)	53–88	(France) Tango Bourges Basket
Scoring by quarter: 15–25, 10–20, 15–26, 13–17
Pts: Lambert 15; Rebs: Hempe 7 Asts: Lambert 3		Pts: Okonkwo 20; Rebs: Diaby 12; Asts: Astier 11

Peace and Friendship Stadium, Piraeus
Attendance: 250
Referees: Mehmet Sahin (TUR), Ivana Ivanovic (SRB), Gellert Kapitany (HUN)

23 October 2024
18:30

Report

Olympiacos SFP (Greece)	67–81	(Turkey) CBK Mersin
Scoring by quarter: 15–18, 21–21, 11–24, 20–18
Pts: Raca 14; Rebs: Hempe 8 Asts: Hempe, Lambert 3		Pts: Howard 35; Rebs: Howard 9 Asts: Anderson, Johannès 6

Peace and Friendship Stadium, Piraeus
Attendance: 250
Referees: Cecília Montgomery-Tóth (HUN), Zoran Mitrovski (MKD), Aurimas Borusas (LTU)

24 October 2024
20:00

Report

Tango Bourges Basket (France)	91–70	(Czech Republic) Žabiny Brno
Scoring by quarter: 20–21, 24–23, 26–14, 21–12
Pts: Diaby 25; Rebs: Diaby 8 Asts: Astier 7		Pts: Cunane 15; Rebs: Kostowicz 11; Asts: Hamzová 4

Palais des sports du Prado, Bourges
Attendance: 4,250
Referees: Jelena Tomic (CRO), Silvia Marziali (ITA), Emma Perry (IRL)

29 October 2024
18:30

Report

CBK Mersin (Turkey)	80–76	(France) Tango Bourges Basket
Scoring by quarter: 21–12, 18–28, 23–20, 18–16
Pts: Howard 29; Rebs: Howard 14; Asts: Anderson, Fauthoux 6		Pts: Diaby 18; Rebs: Diaby 7 Asts: Astier 6

Servet Tazegül Spor Salonu, Mersin
Attendance: 3,000
Referees: Ariadna Chueca (ESP), Ewa Matuszewska (POL), Martina Mekelova (SVK)

29 October 2024
18:30

Report

Olympiacos SFP (Greece)	64–77	(Czech Republic) Žabiny Brno
Scoring by quarter: 25–19, 9–19, 18–20, 12–19
Pts: Christinaki 19; Rebs: Spyridopoulou, Tobin 7 Asts: Kollatou, Tobin 5		Pts: Knežević 19; Rebs: Čechová, Cunane 9 Asts: Hamzová, Cunane

Peace and Friendship Stadium, Piraeus
Attendance: 50
Referees: Silvia Marziali (ITA), Yasmina Alcaraz (ESP), Ori Shalhavi (ISR)

20 November 2024
17:00

Report

Žabiny Brno (Czech Republic)	45–64	(Turkey) CBK Mersin
Scoring by quarter: 10–19, 12–19, 11–9, 12–17
Pts: Cunane 11; Rebs: Kostowicz, Cunane 6 Asts: Hamzová 4		Pts: Howard 21; Rebs: Rupert 9 Asts: Anderson 9

Starez Arena Vodova, Brno
Attendance: 1,258
Referees: Zdravko Rutesic (MNE), Zoran Mitrovski (MKD), Branimir Galić (CRO)

20 November 2024
20:00

Report

Tango Bourges Basket (France)	82–62	(Greece) Olympiacos SFP
Scoring by quarter: 26–13, 21–7, 14–18, 21–24
Pts: Okonkwo 17; Rebs: Diaby 11; Asts: Astier 7		Pts: Christinaiki 13; Rebs: Tobin 8 Asts: Lambert 6

Palais des sports du Prado, Bourges
Attendance: 5,000
Referees: Javier Torres (ESP), Sandra Sánchez (ESP), Emma Perry (IRL)

27 November 2024
19:00

Report

CBK Mersin (Turkey)	87–58	(Greece) Olympiacos SFP
Scoring by quarter: 20–14, 18–16, 27–12, 22–16
Pts: Rupert 16; Rebs: Rupert 9 Asts: Anderson, Araújo 6		Pts: Christinaki 20; Rebs: Hempe 8 Asts: Lambert 7

Servet Tazegül Spor Salonu, Mersin
Attendance: 2,000
Referees: Veronika Obertova (SVK), Milosav Kaluđerović (MNE), Ivan Mijalkovski (MKD)

27 November 2024
16:45

Report

Žabiny Brno (Czech Republic)	65–85	(France) Tango Bourges Basket
Scoring by quarter: 20–15, 12–30, 15–24, 18–16
Pts: Knežević 12; Rebs: Cunane 9 Asts: Cunane 4		Pts: Green 21; Rebs: Diaby 12; Asts: Okonkwo, Green 5

Starez Arena Vodova, Brno
Attendance: 1,079
Referees: Yasmina Alcaraz (ESP), Ivana Ivanovic (SRB), Ewa Matuszewska (POL)

=== Group C ===
Pos	Team	Pld	W	L	PF	PA	PD	Pts	Qualification	FEN	CAS	POL	VIL
1	(Turkey) Fenerbahçe Opet	6	6	0	520	409	+111	12	Second round	—	84–64	90–61	95–75
2	(Spain) Casademont Zaragoza	6	4	2	418	412	+6	10	Second round	69–80	—	76–73	68–59
3	(Poland) KGHM BC Polkowice	6	1	5	458	491	−33	7 (Note: KGHM BC Polkowice 173–163 ESB Villeneuve-d'Ascq)	Second round	88–90	63–72	—	90–63
4	(France) ESB Villeneuve-d'Ascq	6	1	5	402	486	−84	7	EuroCup Women	52–81	53–69	100–83	—

Source: FIBA
Legend: Blue = home team win; Red = away team win.
Rules for classification: 1) Points; 2) Points difference; 3) Points scored.
Notes:

8 October 2024
20:00

Report

Casademont Zaragoza (Spain)	76–73	(Poland) KGHM BC Polkowice
Scoring by quarter: 17–15, 30–21, 8–13, 21–24
Pts: Atkinson 23; Rebs: Pueyo 7 Asts: Pueyo 5		Pts: Šteinberga 17; Rebs: Davis 9 Asts: Gajda 6

Pabellón Príncipe Felipe, Zaragoza
Attendance: 4,025
Referees: Josip Jurčević (CRO), Gellert Kapitany (HUN), Valerio Grigioni (ITA)

9 October 2024
20:00

Report

ESB Villeneuve-d'Ascq (France)	52–81	(Turkey) Fenerbahçe Opet
Scoring by quarter: 19–25, 6–24, 17–13, 10–19
Pts: Leite 14; Rebs: Bone 12; Asts: Leite 6		Pts: Meesseman 20; Rebs: Badiane 11; Asts: Allemand 10

Le Palacium, Villeneuve-d'Ascq
Attendance: 2,200
Referees: Jan Baloun (CZE), Martin van Hoye (BEL), Domen Krajnc (SLO)

16 October 2024
18:00

Report

Fenerbahçe Opet (Turkey)	84–64	(Spain) Casademont Zaragoza
Scoring by quarter: 23–9, 25–23, 23–23, 13–9
Pts: Meesseman 22; Rebs: Meesseman 7 Asts: Williams 6		Pts: Pueyo 16; Rebs: Gatling 9 Asts: Ortiz 9

Metro Enerji Sports Hall, Istanbul
Attendance: 925
Referees: Silvia Marziali (ITA), Stylianos Simeonidis (GRE), Mladen Lucic (MNE)

16 October 2024
19:00

Report

KGHM BC Polkowice (Poland)	90–63	(France) ESB Villeneuve-d'Ascq
Scoring by quarter: 13–15, 31–15, 18–12, 28–21
Pts: Cannon 22; Rebs: Cannon 12; Asts: Peterson 9		Pts: Zellous 19; Rebs: Zellous, Iva Slonsjak 6 Asts: Leite, Foppossi 4

City Sports Hall Polkowice, Polkowice
Attendance: 395
Referees: Jelena Tomic (CRO), Yasmina Alcaraz (ESP), Karolina Andersson (FIN)

23 October 2024
19:00

Report

KGHM BC Polkowice (Poland)	88–90	(Turkey) Fenerbahçe Opet
Scoring by quarter: 20–14, 27–23, 18–26, 23–27
Pts: Cannon 28; Rebs: Cannon 10; Asts: Peterson 8		Pts: Meesseman 22; Rebs: Williams 7 Asts: Uzun 7

City Sports Hall Polkowice, Polkowice
Attendance: 550
Referees: Veronika Obertova (SVK), Nataša Dragojević (MNE), Veronika Vavrova (CZE)

23 October 2024
20:00

Report

ESB Villeneuve-d'Ascq (France)	53–69	(Spain) Casademont Zaragoza
Scoring by quarter: 11–22, 12–11, 15–16, 15–20
Pts: Bone 13; Rebs: Paget 7 Asts: Zellous Bone 4		Pts: Gatling 18; Rebs: Hermosa 8 Asts: Ortiz 6

Le Palacium, Villeneuve-d'Ascq
Attendance: 1,900
Referees: Özlem Yalman (TUR), Ivana Ivanovic (SRB), Ewa Matuszewska (POL)

29 October 2024
17:00

Report

Fenerbahçe Opet (Turkey)	95–75	(France) ESB Villeneuve-d'Ascq
Scoring by quarter: 21–16, 26–23, 22–19, 26–17
Pts: Meesseman 23; Rebs: Charles 6 Asts: Allemand 7		Pts: Peters 21; Rebs: Zellous 8 Asts: Paget 6

Metro Enerji Sports Hall, Istanbul
Referees: Marius Ciulin (ROU), Radomir Vojinovic (MNE), Ritvars Helmšteins (LVA)

29 October 2024
19:00

Report

KGHM BC Polkowice (Poland)	63–72	(Spain) Casademont Zaragoza
Scoring by quarter: 24–16, 13–13, 17–17, 9–23
Pts: Šteinberga 21; Rebs: Cannon 12; Asts: Peterson 6		Pts: Nyström 15; Rebs: Czukor, Gatling 7 Asts: Ortiz, Czukor 5

City Sports Hall Polkowice, Polkowice
Attendance: 450
Referees: Gellert Kapitany (HUN), Emma Perry (IRE), Einars Tukiss (LVA)

20 November 2024
20:00

Report

ESB Villeneuve-d'Ascq (France)	100–83	(Poland) KGHM BC Polkowice
Scoring by quarter: 17–26, 29–20, 31–23, 23–14
Pts: Leite 24; Rebs: Bone, Peters 9 Asts: three players 5		Pts: Cannon 23; Rebs: Cannon 10; Asts: Gajda 7

Le Palacium, Villeneuve-d'Ascq
Attendance: 2,100
Referees: Yasmina Alcaraz (ESP), Nikola Bejat (NOR), Nermin Hodzic (GER)

20 November 2024
20:00

Report

Casademont Zaragoza (Spain)	69–80	(Turkey) Fenerbahçe Opet
Scoring by quarter: 11–26, 11–10, 25–23, 22–21
Pts: Pueyo 15; Rebs: Hermosa 9 Asts: Ortiz 6		Pts: Atkins 16; Rebs: Allemand 6 Asts: Allemand 8

Pabellón Príncipe Felipe, Zaragoza
Attendance: 4,658
Referees: Paulina Karolina Gajdosz (POL), Petr Hrůša (CZE), Tom de Lange (BEL)

27 November 2024
19:00

Report

Fenerbahçe Opet (Turkey)	90–61	(Poland) KGHM BC Polkowice
Scoring by quarter: 23–17, 31–14, 27–15, 9–15
Pts: Meesseman 13; Rebs: Badiane 9 Asts: Meesseman 9		Pts: Cannon 23; Rebs: Cannon 7 Asts: Gajda 9

Metro Enerji Sports Hall, Istanbul
Attendance: 2,500
Referees: Kirile Tvauri (GEO), László Goda (HUN), Tomi Panov (MKD)

27 November 2024
20:00

Report

Casademont Zaragoza (Spain)	68–59	(France) ESB Villeneuve-d'Ascq
Scoring by quarter: 20–16, 5–20, 19–11, 24–12
Pts: Pueyo 18; Rebs: Hermosa 10; Asts: Ortiz, Mawuli 3		Pts: Zellous 13; Rebs: Peters 14; Asts: Peters 5

Pabellón Príncipe Felipe, Zaragoza
Attendance: 4,226
Referees: Silvia Marziali (ITA), Tiago Roxo Perdigão (POR), Luís Daniel Mascarenhas de Oliveira (POR)

=== Group D ===
Pos	Team	Pld	W	L	PF	PA	PD	Pts	Qualification	VAL	PRA	REY	GYO
1	(Spain) Valencia Basket	6	5	1	457	406	+51	11	Second round	—	82–60	83–72	74–59
2	(Czech Republic) ZVVZ USK Praha	6	4	2	475	442	+33	10	Second round	64–67	—	100–85	82–62
3	(Italy) Umana Reyer Venezia	6	3	3	460	463	−3	9	Second round	75–67	66–86	—	82–68
4	(Hungary) Uni Győr	6	0	6	404	485	−81	6	EuroCup Women	74–86	76–81	59–80	—

Source: FIBA
Legend: Blue = home team win; Red = away team win.
Rules for classification: 1) Points; 2) Points difference; 3) Points scored.

9 October 2024
20:00

Report

Valencia Basket (Spain)	80–62	(Czech Republic) ZVVZ USK Praha
Scoring by quarter: 14–21, 18–15, 22–16, 26–10
Pts: Casas 10; Rebs: Fingall 7 Asts: Casas 5		Pts: Harrison 15; Rebs: Ayayi, Harrison 8 Asts: Conde 7

Fuente de San Lluís, Valencia
Attendance: 3,672
Referees: Paulina Karolina Gajdosz (POL), Silvia Marziali (ITA), Sinisa Prpa (SRB)

10 October 2024
18:00

Report

Uni Győr (Hungary)	59–80	(Italy) Umana Reyer Venezia
Scoring by quarter: 14–18, 20–16, 11–24, 14–22
Pts: Goree 13; Rebs: Kiss 9 Asts: Dubei 7		Pts: 15 Cubaj; Rebs: 6 three players Asts: 5 Berkani

University Hall of Györ, Győr
Attendance: 250
Referees: Blaz Zupancic (SLO), Maria Ignatiou (CYP), Nataša Dragojević (MNE)

16 October 2024
19:00

Report

ZVVZ USK Praha (Czech Republic)	82–62	(Hungary) Uni Győr
Scoring by quarter: 17–10, 28–24, 25–16, 12–18
Pts: Conde 26; Rebs: Hof 7 Asts: Conde 10		Pts: Dubei 14; Rebs: Garbin 6 Asts: Bach 4

Královka Arena, Prague
Attendance: 892
Referees: Amal Dahra (FRA), Rainis Värv (EST), Ewa Matuszewska (POL)

17 October 2024
21:00

Report

Umana Reyer Venezia (Italy)	75–67	(Spain) Valencia Basket
Scoring by quarter: 14–25, 22–14, 21–14, 18–14
Pts: Berkani 18; Rebs: Cubaj 6 Asts: four players 3		Pts: Iagupova 15; Rebs: Fingall 12; Asts: three players 3

Palasport Taliercio, Venice
Attendance: 1,386
Referees: Özlem Yalman (TUR), Martina Mekelova (SVK), Teo Miletić (CRO)

23 October 2024
20:00

Report

Valencia Basket (Spain)	74–59	(Hungary) Uni Győr
Scoring by quarter: 20–21, 18–11, 21–10, 15–17
Pts: Határ 12; Rebs: Mavunga 12; Asts: Iagupova 7		Pts: Dombai 16; Rebs: Dombai 6 Asts: three players 4

Fuente de San Lluís, Valencia
Attendance: 2,488
Referees: Cisil Güngör (TUR), Henri Hilke (FIN), Milita Stalaucinskaite (LTU)

24 October 2024
19:30

Report

Umana Reyer Venezia (Italy)	66–86	(Czech Republic) ZVVZ USK Praha
Scoring by quarter: 13–22, 24–26, 16–20, 13–18
Pts: Kuier 16; Rebs: Smalls 8 Asts: Berkani 8		Pts: Conde 20; Rebs: Jones 11; Asts: Conde 5

Palasport Taliercio, Venice
Attendance: 1,593
Referees: Viola Györgyi (NOR), Paulina Karolina Gajdosz (POL), Ioannis Agrafiotis (GRE)

29 October 2024
19:00

Report

ZVVZ USK Praha (Czech Republic)	64–67	(Spain) Valencia Basket
Scoring by quarter: 14–19, 24–13, 12–24, 14–11
Pts: Ayayi 14; Rebs: Hof 7 Asts: Voráčková, Conde 4		Pts: Iagupova 13; Rebs: Mavunga 9 Asts: Romero 5

Královka Arena, Prague
Attendance: 1,223
Referees: Ivana Ivanovic (SRB), Nikola Bejat (NOR), Maria Ignatiou (CYP)

30 October 2024
19:30

Report

Umana Reyer Venezia (Italy)	82–68	(Hungary) Uni Győr
Scoring by quarter: 26–25, 16–14, 17–16, 23–13
Pts: Kuier 17; Rebs: Cubaj 7 Asts: Villa 6		Pts: Dubei 14; Rebs: Kiss, Garbin 6 Asts: Wentzel 5

Palasport Taliercio, Venice
Attendance: 973
Referees: Veronika Obertova (SVK), Amal Dahra (FRA), Sandra Sánchez González (ESP)

20 November 2024
20:00

Report

Valencia Basket (Spain)	83–72	(Italy) Umana Reyer Venezia
Scoring by quarter: 19–17, 17–17, 20–15, 27–23
Pts: Romero 17; Rebs: Casas 8 Asts: Romero, Iagupova 8		Pts: Kuier 20; Rebs: Kuier 7 Asts: Stanković 5

Fuente de San Lluís, Valencia
Attendance: 2,439
Referees: Edgard Ceccarelli (FRA), Ewa Matuszewska (POL), Nemanja Ninkovic (SRB)

21 November 2024
18:00

Report

Uni Győr (Hungary)	76–81	(Czech Republic) ZVVZ USK Praha
Scoring by quarter: 21–20, 16–22, 24–16, 15–23
Pts: Kiss 16; Rebs: Telenga 7 Asts: Carleton 5		Pts: Jones 21; Rebs: Ayayi, Jones 10; Asts: Conde 7

University Hall of Györ, Győr
Attendance: 412
Referees: Özlem Yalman (TUR), Jelena Tomić (CRO), Çisil Güngör (TUR)

27 November 2024
18:00

Report

Uni Győr (Hungary)	74–86	(Spain) Valencia Basket
Scoring by quarter: 13–23, 14–24, 23–18, 24–21
Pts: Carleton 18; Rebs: Carleton 10; Asts: Dombai6		Pts: Vītola, Iagupova 15; Rebs: Mavunga 9 Asts: Turner 7

University Hall of Györ, Győr
Attendance: 350
Referees: Josip Jurčević (CRO), Martina Mekelova (SVK), Maria Ignatiou (CYP)

27 November 2024
19:00

Report

ZVVZ USK Praha (Czech Republic)	100–85	(Italy) Umana Reyer Venezia
Scoring by quarter: 27–19, 24–27, 25–13, 24–26
Pts: Cazorla, Conde 18; Rebs: Hof 9 Asts: Ayayi 8		Pts: Stanković 18; Rebs: Stanković, Kuier 8 Asts: Villa, Santucci 8

Královka Arena, Prague
Attendance: 1,026
Referees: Tolga Edis (TUR), Amal Dahra (FRA), Elvis Binders-Čoders (LAT)

== Second round ==
=== Group E ===
Pos	Team	Pld	W	L	PF	PA	PD	Pts	Qualification	MER	SCH	TAN	LAN	AVE	ZAB
1	(Turkey) CBK Mersin	12	11	1	935	776	+159	23	Semifinal play in	—	86–52	80–76	74–67	79–62	88–74
2	(Italy) Beretta Famila Schio	12	9	3	872	812	+60	21	Semifinal play in	83–71	—	67–62	64–60	92–58	76–68
3	(France) Tango Bourges Basket	12	7	5	912	813	+99	19	Quarterfinal play in	66–77	72–84	—	75–61	80–67	91–70
4	(France) Basket Landes	12	6	6	758	796	−38	18	Quarterfinal play in	53–73	68–59	76–73	—	59–58	76–60
5	(Spain) Perfumerias Avenida	12	5	7	783	818	−35	17		73–75	69–79	51–62	81–52	—	64–58
6	(Czech Republic) Žabiny Brno	12	3	9	812	881	−69	15		45–64	71–82	65–85	69–65	63–65	—

Source: FIBA
Legend: Blue = home team win; Red = away team win.
Rules for classification: 1) Points; 2) Points difference; 3) Points scored.

11 December 2024
20:30

Report

Perfumerias Avenida (Spain)	73–75	(Turkey) CBK Mersin
Scoring by quarter: 26–22, 20–25, 11–11, 16–17
Pts: Fasoula 17; Rebs: three players 5 Asts: Martín, Carter 6		Pts: Anderson 21; Rebs: Howard 10; Asts: Anderson 4

Pabellón Municipal de Würzburg, Salamanca
Attendance: 2,985
Referees: Paulina Karolina Gajdosz (POL), Ewa Matuszewska (POL), Alessandro Perciavalle (ITA)

11 December 2024
19:30

Report

Basket Landes (France)	76–73	(France) Tango Bourges Basket
Scoring by quarter: 23–17, 19–22, 22–13, 12–21
Pts: Djaldi-Tabdi, Slocum 14; Rebs: Macquet, Ewodo 6 Asts: Slocum 4		Pts: Pouye 14; Rebs: Spanou 11; Asts: Green 4

Espace François Mitterrand, Mont-de-Marsan
Attendance: 2,600
Referees: Silvia Marziali (ITA), Rainis Värv (EST), Nermin Hodžić (GER)

11 December 2024
20:00

Report

Beretta Famila Schio (Italy)	76–68	(Czech Republic) Žabiny Brno
Scoring by quarter: 12–6, 24–18, 14–18, 26–26
Pts: Laksa 23; Rebs: Andre 11; Asts: Verona 8		Pts: Knežević 15; Rebs: Kostowicz 11; Asts: Kostowicz 4

Palazzetto Livio Romare, Schio
Attendance: 1,223
Referees: Çisil Güngör (TUR), Nataša Dragojević (MNE), Maria Ignatiou (CYP)

17 December 2024
17:00

Report

Žabiny Brno (Czech Republic)	69–65	(France) Basket Landes
Scoring by quarter: 19–13, 15–10, 18–23, 17–19
Pts: Čechová 15; Rebs: Kostowicz 10; Asts: Hamzová, Cunane 4		Pts: Geiselsöder 23; Rebs: Geiselsöder 7 Asts: Lacan 5

Starez Arena Vodova, Brno
Attendance: 1,295
Referees: Özlem Yalman (TUR), Ewa Matuszewska (POL), Sandra Sánchez González (ESP)

18 December 2024
19:00

Report

CBK Mersin (Turkey)	86–52	(Italy) Beretta Famila Schio
Scoring by quarter: 23–8, 24–9, 18–20, 21–15
Pts: Howard 26; Rebs: Rupert 9 Asts: Fauthoux 8		Pts: Dojkić, Laksa 11; Rebs: Andre 10; Asts: Verona 4

Servet Tazegül Spor Salonu, Mersin
Attendance: 3,000
Referees: Yasmina Alcaraz (ESP), Zoran Mitrovski (MKD), Mladen Lučić (MNE)

18 December 2024
20:00

Report

Tango Bourges Basket (France)	80–67	(Spain) Perfumerias Avenida
Scoring by quarter: 18–21, 18–13, 23–19, 21–14
Pts: Okonkwo 25; Rebs: Okonkwo, Diaby 8 Asts: Green 6		Pts: Carter 21; Rebs: Gil 9 Asts: Domínguez, Carter 4

Palais des sports du Prado, Bourges
Attendance: 3,055
Referees: Jelena Tomic (CRO), Veronika Obertová (SVK), Jan Baloun (CZE)

7 January 2025
20:00

Report

Beretta Famila Schio (Italy)	67–62	(France) Tango Bourges Basket
Scoring by quarter: 13–24, 19–19, 8–10, 27–9
Pts: Juhász 14; Rebs: Juhász 12; Asts: Juhász 4		Pts: Okonkwo 22; Rebs: Okonkwo 8 Asts: Green 9

Palazzetto Livio Romare, Schio
Attendance: 1,630
Referees: Özlem Yalman (TUR), Maria Ignatiou (CYP), Branimir Galić (CRO)

8 January 2025
19:30

Report

Basket Landes (France)	53–73	(Turkey) CBK Mersin
Scoring by quarter: 10–13, 17–25, 14–18, 12–17
Pts: Geiselsöder 10; Rebs: Treffers 7 Asts: Pardon 4		Pts: Howard 24; Rebs: Howard 14; Asts: Anderson 9

Espace François Mitterrand, Mont-de-Marsan
Attendance: 2,600
Referees: Paulina Karolina Gajdosz (POL), Ivana Ivanovic (SRB), Nikola Bejat (NOR)

8 January 2025
20:30

Report

Perfumerias Avenida (Spain)	64–58	(Czech Republic) Žabiny Brno
Scoring by quarter: 19–14, 14–18, 18–10, 13–16
Pts: Gil 13; Rebs: Gil 11; Asts: Martín 5		Pts: Dudášová 14; Rebs: Cunane 8 Asts: Zeithammerová, Hamzová 3

Pabellón Municipal de Würzburg, Salamanca
Attendance: 2,725
Referees: Cisil Güngör (TUR), Amal Dahra (FRA), Tiago Roxo Perdigão (POR)

14 January 2025
17:00

Report

Žabiny Brno (Czech Republic)	71–82	(Italy) Beretta Famila Schio
Scoring by quarter: 14–21, 21–25, 17–15, 19–21
Pts: Kostowicz 17; Rebs: Hamzová 8 Asts: Hamzová 6		Pts: Salaün 17; Rebs: Juhász 13; Asts: Dojkić 6

Starez Arena Vodova, Brno
Attendance: 1,351
Referees: Yasmina Alcaraz (ESP), Ewa Matuszewska (POL), Viktor Nagy (HUN)

15 January 2025
19:00

Report

CBK Mersin (Turkey)	79–62	(Spain) Perfumerias Avenida
Scoring by quarter: 30–15, 18–16, 16–20, 15–11
Pts: Rupert 34; Rebs: Carleton 10; Asts: Fauthoux 8		Pts: Koné, Gil 12; Rebs: Gil 7 Asts: Gil 6

Servet Tazegül Spor Salonu, Mersin
Attendance: 3,000
Referees: Silvia Marziali (ITA), Veronika Obertová (SVK), Nemanja Vlahović (SRB)

15 January 2025
20:00

Report

Tango Bourges Basket (France)	75–61	(France) Basket Landes
Scoring by quarter: 17–18, 21–12, 16–16, 21–15
Pts: Pouye 17; Rebs: Diaby 11; Asts: Astier 7		Pts: Ewodo 18; Rebs: Geiselsöder 9 Asts: Slocum 5

Palais des sports du Prado, Bourges
Attendance: 3,395
Referees: Jelena Tomic (CRO), Tijmen Last (NED), Karol Kowalski (FIN)

22 January 2025
19:30

Report

Basket Landes (France)	76–60	(Czech Republic) Žabiny Brno
Scoring by quarter: 18–15, 16–23, 20–10, 22–12
Pts: Lacan 18; Rebs: Geiselsöder 7 Asts: three players 3		Pts: Kostowicz 14; Rebs: Kostowicz, Cunane 8 Asts: Juškaitė 4

Espace François Mitterrand, Mont-de-Marsan
Attendance: 2,600
Referees: Silvia Marziali (ITA), Esperanza Mendoza (ESP), Martin van Hoye (BEL)

22 January 2025
20:00

Report

Beretta Famila Schio (Italy)	83–71	(Turkey) CBK Mersin
Scoring by quarter: 23–16, 25–21, 16–17, 19–17
Pts: Laksa 25; Rebs: Juhász 17; Asts: Verona, Dojkić 6		Pts: Rupert 18; Rebs: Rupert 11; Asts: Fauthoux 8

Palazzetto Livio Romare, Schio
Attendance: 1,830
Referees: Ariadna Chueca (ESP), Cecília Montgomery-Tóth (HUN), Nataša Dragojević (MNE)

22 January 2025
20:30

Report

Perfumerias Avenida (Spain)	51–62	(France) Tango Bourges Basket
Scoring by quarter: 19–19, 16–17, 7–18, 9–8
Pts: Jespersen 12; Rebs: Fasoula 6 Asts: Carter 6		Pts: Okonkwo 21; Rebs: Okonkwo 11; Asts: Green, Astier 3

Pabellón Municipal de Würzburg, Salamanca
Attendance: 2,830
Referees: Özlem Yalman (TUR), Paulina Karolina Gajdosz (POL), Maria Ignatiou (CYP)

28 January 2025
19:00

Report

CBK Mersin (Turkey)	74–67	(France) Basket Landes
Scoring by quarter: 16–29, 24–19, 16–5, 18–14
Pts: Carleton 23; Rebs: Araújo 11; Asts: Fauthoux 7		Pts: Slocum 16; Rebs: Treffers 10; Asts: Slocum 5

Servet Tazegül Spor Salonu, Mersin
Attendance: 3,000
Referees: Jelena Tomic (CRO), Yasmina Alcaraz (ESP), Veronika Vávrová (CZE)

28 January 2025
17:00

Report

Žabiny Brno (Czech Republic)	63–65	(Spain) Perfumerias Avenida
Scoring by quarter: 24–8, 17–21, 14–18, 8–18
Pts: Cunane 13; Rebs: Kostowicz 7 Asts: Záplatová 4		Pts: Martín 20; Rebs: Gil 7 Asts: Carter 5

Starez Arena Vodova, Brno
Attendance: 1,157
Referees: Cisil Güngör (TUR), Nataša Dragojević (MNE), Sara Månsson (SWE)

28 January 2025
20:00

Report

Tango Bourges Basket (France)	72–84	(Italy) Beretta Famila Schio
Scoring by quarter: 19–25, 19–17, 24–16, 10–26
Pts: Diaby 19; Rebs: Pouye 7 Asts: Astier 9		Pts: Salaün 19; Rebs: Juhász, Salaün 8 Asts: Dojkić 5

Palais des sports du Prado, Bourges
Attendance: 3,413
Referees: Esperanza Mendoza (ESP), Alexandra-Ioana Stan (ROU), Veronika Obertová (SVK)

=== Group F ===
Pos	Team	Pld	W	L	PF	PA	PD	Pts	Qualification	FEN	VAL	PRA	CAS	REY	POL
1	(Turkey) Fenerbahçe Opet	10	10	0	823	649	+174	20	Semifinal play in	—	92–56	75–71	84–64	86–66	~~90–61~~
2	(Spain) Valencia Basket	10	7	3	753	732	+21	17	Semifinal play in	71–88	—	82–60	90–82	83–72	~~15 Jan~~
3	(Czech Republic) ZVVZ USK Praha	10	5	5	740	719	+21	15 (Note: ZVVZ USK Praha 140–139 Casademont Zaragoza)	Quarterfinal play in	54–63	64–67	—	72–66	100–85	~~82–45~~
4	(Spain) Casademont Zaragoza	10	5	5	663	680	−17	15	Quarterfinal play in	69–80	64–79	73–68	—	64–56	~~76–73~~
5	(Italy) Umana Reyer Venezia	10	3	7	692	736	−44	13		71–79	75–67	66–86	39–44	—	~~28 Jan~~
6	(Poland) KGHM BC Polkowice (Note: On 4 January 2025, KGHM BC Polkowice withdrew from the competition due to financial reasons. All games involving KGHM BC Polkowice will be annulled and not count for the rankings.)	8	1	7	559	639	−80	9	Withdrew	~~88–90~~	~~56–66~~	~~22 Jan~~	~~63–72~~	~~8 Jan~~	—

Source: FIBA
Legend: Blue = home team win; Red = away team win.
Rules for classification: 1) Points; 2) Points difference; 3) Points scored.
Notes:

11 December 2024
19:00

Report

KGHM BC Polkowice (Poland)	56–66	(Spain) Valencia Basket
Scoring by quarter: 16–20, 20–15, 11–17, 9–14
Pts: Cannon 25; Rebs: Cannon 17; Asts: Davis 6		Pts: Casas 12; Rebs: Mavunga 11; Asts: Turner 6

City Sports Hall Polkowice, Polkowice
Attendance: 343
Referees: Jelena Tomic (CRO), Ivana Ivanovic (SRB), Amal Dahra (FRA)

12 December 2024
18:30

Report

Fenerbahçe Opet (Turkey)	75–71	(Czech Republic) ZVVZ USK Praha
Scoring by quarter: 23–11, 18–28, 20–19, 14–13
Pts: Charles 18; Rebs: Meesseman 9 Asts: Allemand 6		Pts: Jones 19; Rebs: Ayayi 12; Asts: Conde 8

Metro Enerji Sports Hall, Istanbul
Attendance: 600
Referees: Cecília Montgomery-Tóth (HUN), Viola Györgyi (NOR), Yasmina Alcaraz (ESP)

12 December 2024
20:00

Report

Casademont Zaragoza (Spain)	64–56	(Italy) Umana Reyer Venezia
Scoring by quarter: 9–21, 16–12, 24–13, 15–10
Pts: Atkinson 13; Rebs: Hermosa, Gatling 8 Asts: Flores 5		Pts: Kuier 21; Rebs: Kuier 7 Asts: Cubaj 5

Pabellón Príncipe Felipe, Zaragoza
Attendance: 4,318
Referees: Özlem Yalman (TUR), Veronika Obertová (SVK), Branimir Galić (CRO)

17 December 2024
19:15

Report

Valencia Basket (Spain)	90–82 (OT)	(Spain) Casademont Zaragoza
Scoring by quarter: 21–19, 16–16, 20–18, 20–24, Overtime: 13–5
Pts: Mavunga 19; Rebs: Mavunga 11; Asts: Turner, Iagupova 7		Pts: Mawuli 25; Rebs: Atkinson 10; Asts: Ortiz 10

Font de Sant Lluís, Valencia
Attendance: 2,135
Referees: Edgard Ceccarelli (FRA), Paulina Karolin Gajdosz (POL), Andrea Bongiorni (ITA)

18 December 2024
19:00

Report

ZVVZ USK Praha (Czech Republic)	82–45	(Poland) KGHM BC Polkowice
Scoring by quarter: 29–15, 17–12, 21–7, 15–11
Pts: Voráčková, Jones 19; Rebs: Conde 9 Asts: Conde 7		Pts: Cannon 17; Rebs: Cannon 11; Asts: Gajda 5

Královka Arena, Prague
Attendance: 562
Referees: Cisil Güngör (TUR), Silvia Marziali (ITA), Emma Perry (IRL)

18 December 2024
19:30

Report

Umana Reyer Venezia (Italy)	71–79	(Turkey) Fenerbahçe Opet
Scoring by quarter: 13–20, 16–20, 25–16, 17–20
Pts: Kuier 24; Rebs: Kuier 12; Asts: three players 3		Pts: Meesseman 21; Rebs: Meesseman 8 Asts: Meesseman 5

Palasport Taliercio, Venice
Attendance: 837
Referees: Lukasz Jankowski (POL), Ivana Ivanovic (SRB), Elvis Binders-Coders (LAT)

8 January 2025
19:00

Report

Fenerbahçe Opet (Turkey)	92–56	(Spain) Valencia Basket
Scoring by quarter: 22–18, 22–8, 24–11, 24–19
Pts: Williams 14; Rebs: Meesseman, Sabally 4 Asts: Williams, Meesseman 6		Pts: Mavunga 16; Rebs: Alexander 9 Asts: Turner 6

Metro Enerji Sports Hall, Istanbul
Attendance: 1,000
Referees: Silvia Marziali (ITA), Jelena Tomic (CRO), Nataša Dragojević (MNE)

8 January 2025
20:00

Report

Casademont Zaragoza (Spain)	73–68	(Czech Republic) ZVVZ USK Praha
Scoring by quarter: 27–24, 15–14, 20–19, 11–11
Pts: Ortiz 15; Rebs: Atkinson, Gatling 6 Asts: Ortiz 6		Pts: Ayayi 17; Rebs: Jones 10; Asts: Ayayi 4

Pabellón Príncipe Felipe, Zaragoza
Attendance: 4,837
Referees: Lukasz Jankowski (POL), Ewa Matuszewska (POL), Alexandre Maret (FRA)

15 January 2025
19:00

Report

ZVVZ USK Praha (Czech Republic)	54–63	(Turkey) Fenerbahçe Opet
Scoring by quarter: 18–12, 16–23, 11–15, 9–13
Pts: Jones 12; Rebs: Jones 12; Asts: Cazorla, Ayayi 4		Pts: Meesseman 19; Rebs: Meesseman 9 Asts: Allemand 5

Královka Arena, Prague
Attendance: 1,219
Referees: Cecília Montgomery-Tóth (HUN), Viola Györgyi (NOR), Paulina Karolina Gajdosz (POL)

16 January 2025
19:00

Report

Umana Reyer Venezia (Italy)	39–44	(Spain) Casademont Zaragoza
Scoring by quarter: 10–11, 6–14, 13–12, 10–7
Pts: Kuier 10; Rebs: Cubaj 10; Asts: Villa, Santucci 2		Pts: Atkinson 9 Rebs: Atkinson 10; Asts: Ortiz 7

Palasport Taliercio, Venice
Attendance: 927
Referees: Özlem Yalman (TUR), Nikolaos Tziopanos (GRE), Nermin Hodzic (GER)

22 January 2025
19:00

Report

Fenerbahçe Opet (Turkey)	86–66	(Italy) Umana Reyer Venezia
Scoring by quarter: 22–25, 25–8, 23–20, 16–13
Pts: Meesseman 22; Rebs: Charles 10; Asts: Meesseman 9		Pts: Smalls, Kuier 15; Rebs: Kuier 8 Asts: Kuier 3

Metro Enerji Sports Hall, Istanbul
Attendance: 650
Referees: Jelena Tomic (CRO), Veronika Obertová (SVK), Ewa Matuszewska (POL)

22 January 2025
20:00

Report

Casademont Zaragoza (Spain)	64–79	(Spain) Valencia Basket
Scoring by quarter: 23–21, 21–16, 11–25, 9–17
Pts: Gatling 12; Rebs: Gatling 8 Asts: Ortiz 7		Pts: Romero 19; Rebs: three players 5 Asts: Mavunga, Romero 5

Pabellón Príncipe Felipe, Zaragoza
Attendance: 5,892
Referees: Viola Györgyi (NOR), Çisil Güngör (TUR), Amal Dahra (FRA)

28 January 2025
19:00

Report

ZVVZ USK Praha (Czech Republic)	72–66	(Spain) Casademont Zaragoza
Scoring by quarter: 29–23, 19–10, 16–13, 8–20
Pts: Ayayi 19; Rebs: Jones 15; Asts: Cazorla 6		Pts: Mawuli 23; Rebs: Mawuli, Gatling 6 Asts: Mawuli 4

Královka Arena, Prague
Attendance: 1,005
Referees: Özlem Yalman (TUR), Ivana Ivanovic (SRB), Ritvars Helmsteins (LAT)

28 January 2025
19:15

Report

Valencia Basket (Spain)	71–88	(Turkey) Fenerbahçe Opet
Scoring by quarter: 14–29, 17–30, 17–14, 23–15
Pts: Flórez 17; Rebs: Alexander 7 Asts: Flórez 5		Pts: Williams; Rebs: Williams 7 Asts: Allemand 9

Font de Sant Lluís, Valencia
Attendance: 2,504
Referees: Cecília Montgomery-Tóth (HUN), Paulina Karolina Gajdosz (POL), Silvia Marziali (ITA)

==== Cancelled games involving (Poland) KGHM BC Polkowice ====
8 January 2025
19:00

Report

KGHM BC Polkowice (Poland)	vs.	(Italy) Umana Reyer Venezia
Scoring by quarter: –, –, –, –

City Sports Hall Polkowice, Polkowice

15 January 2025
19:15

Report

Valencia Basket (Spain)	vs.	(Poland) KGHM BC Polkowice
Scoring by quarter: –, –, –, –

Font de Sant Lluís, Valencia

22 January 2025
19:00

Report

KGHM BC Polkowice (Poland)	vs.	(Czech Republic) ZVVZ USK Praha
Scoring by quarter: –, –, –, –

City Sports Hall Polkowice, Polkowice

28 January 2025
19:30

Report

Umana Reyer Venezia (Italy)	vs.	(Poland) KGHM BC Polkowice
Scoring by quarter: –, –, –, –

Palasport Taliercio, Venice

== See also ==
- 2024–25 EuroLeague Women
- 2024–25 EuroCup Women
- 2024 FIBA Europe SuperCup Women
- 2024–25 EuroLeague Women qualification round
- 2024–25 EuroCup Women qualification round
- 2024–25 EuroCup Women knockout stage
