= 2024–25 EuroCup Women qualification round =

EuroCup Women qualification round
- Season: 2024–25
- Dates: 18–25 September 2024
- Games played: 10
- Teams: 10 (from 7 countries)

The 2024–25 EuroCup Women qualification round decided the final five teams in the regular season.

== Format ==
Ten teams were divided into five play offs, where the winners on aggregate advanced to the regular season.

== Teams ==
Location of teams of the 2024–25 EuroCup Women qualification round.
Orange: Play Off 1; Green: Play Off 2; Pink: Play Off 3; Cyan: Play Off 4; Purple: Play Off 5.

Teams
(France) UFAB 49
(Germany) GiroLive Panthers Osnabrück
(Greece) Pas Giannina
(Greece) Iraklis SC
(Hungary) TFSE-MTK Budapest
(Italy) BDS Dinamo Sassari
(Italy) O.ME.P.S. Battipaglia
(Romania) CS Universitatea Cluj
(Spain) Baxi Ferrol
(Turkey) Bodrum Basketbol

== Draw ==
The draw took place in Munich, Germany on the 18 July 2024. The bold text means which teams advanced.

Seeded	Unseeded
(Spain) **Baxi Ferrol** (Italy) **BDS Dinamo Sassari** (Turkey) **Bodrum Basketbol** (Romania) CS Universitatea Cluj (France) **UFAB 49**	(Germany) GiroLive Panthers Osnabrück (Greece) **Iraklis SC** (Italy) O.ME.P.S. Battipaglia (Greece) Pas Giannina (Hungary) TFSE-MTK Budapest

== Matches ==
The five winners on aggregate advanced to the regular season.

Team 1	Agg.	Team 2	1st leg	2nd leg
Pas Giannina (Greece)	113–**175**	(Italy) **BDS Dinamo Sassari**	63–80	50–95
GiroLive Panthers Osnabrück (Germany)	102–**148**	(Turkey) **Bodrum Basketbol**	36–78	66–70
O.ME.P.S. Battipaglia (Italy)	92–**178**	(Spain) **Baxi Ferrol**	47–89	45–89
**Iraklis SC** (Greece)	**121**–119	(Romania) CS Universitatea Cluj	61–50	60–69 OT
TFSE-MTK Budapest (Hungary)	134–**173**	(France) **UFAB 49**	57–90	77–83

All times are local.

18 September 2024
20:30

Report

Pas Giannina (Greece)	63–**80**	(Italy) **BDS Dinamo Sassari**
Scoring by quarter: 17–**21**, 17–**23**, 13–**19**, 16–**17**
Pts: Griffith-Wallace 26; Rebs: Sarigiannidou 8 Asts: four players 3		Pts: Gonzales 22; Rebs: Diallo 9 Asts: Carangelo 11

Neo Kleisto Ioanninon, Ioannina
Attendance: 600
Referees: Yasmina Alcaraz (ESP), Sinisa Prpa (SRB), Mladen Lucic (MNE)

25 September 2024
20:30

Report

**BDS Dinamo Sassari** (Italy)	**95**–50	(Greece) Pas Giannina
Scoring by quarter: **28**–10, **25** –4, **27**–20, 15–**16**
Pts: Taylor 26; Rebs: Silvia Pastrello 10; Asts: Chiara Grattini 8		Pts: Sarigiannidou 24; Rebs: two players 6 Asts: Georgia Damoulaki 5

Palaserradimigni, Sassari
Attendance: 574
Referees: Veronika Obertova (SVK), Nikola Perlic (CRO), Domen Krajnc (SLO)

BDS Dinamo Sassari won 175–113 on aggregate

19 September 2024
19:00

Report

GiroLive Panthers Osnabrück (Germany)	36–**78**	(Turkey) **Bodrum Basketbol**
Scoring by quarter: 8–**21**, 6–**22**, **17**–15, 5–**20**
Pts: Sudhoff 8 Rebs: Klug, Monpierre 5 Asts: Monpierre 3		Pts: Taşar, Krajišnik 13; Rebs: Krajišnik 13; Asts: Bilgiç 5

Artland Arena, Quakenbrück
Attendance: 300
Referees: Viola Györgyi (NOR), Veronika Obertova (SVK), Ewa Matuszewska (POL)

25 September 2024
19:00

Report

**Bodrum Basketbol** (Turkey)	**70**–66	(Germany) GiroLive Panthers Osnabrück
Scoring by quarter: **18**–16, **20**–9, **22**–19, 10–**22**
Pts: Thomas, Krajišnik 15; Rebs: Krajišnik 8 Asts: Thomas 6		Pts: Sudhoff 16; Rebs: Sudhoff 10; Asts: Costa 4

Bodrum Spor Salonu, Mugla
Attendance: 400
Referees: Yasmina Alcaraz (ESP), Paulina Karolina Gajdosz (POL), Andrea Bongiorni (ITA)

Bodrum Basketbol won 148–102 on aggregate

19 September 2024
20:30

Report

O.ME.P.S. Battipaglia (Italy)	47–**89**	(Spain) **Baxi Ferrol**
Scoring by quarter: 8–**27**, 13–**25**, 14–**16**, 12–**21**
Pts: Benson 18; Rebs: Benson 12; Asts: Cupido 3		Pts: Melia 17; Rebs: Mestres 12; Asts: Mestres, Menéndez 4

Palazauli, Battipaglia
Referees: Blaz Zupancic (SLO), Maria Ignatiou (CYP), Nataša Dragojević (MNE)

26 September 2024
20:00

Report

**Baxi Ferrol** (Spain)	**89**–45	(Italy) O.ME.P.S. Battipaglia
Scoring by quarter: 16–**17**, **25**–9, **23**–12, **25**–7
Pts: Collins 18; Rebs: Mestres 13; Asts: Mestres, Mataix 5		Pts: Benson 14; Rebs: Seka 8 Asts: Seka 4

Polideportivo A Malata, Ferrol
Attendance: 2,305
Referees: Nermin Hodzic (GER), Aurimas Borusas (LTU), Nikolaos Tziopanos (GRE)

Baxi Ferrol won 178–92 on aggregate

19 September 2024
20:00

Report

**Iraklis SC** (Greece)	**61**–50	(Romania) CS Universitatea Cluj
Scoring by quarter: **13**–12, 16–16, **20**–10, 12–12
Pts: Aftzi 16; Rebs: Westbrook 12; Asts: Aftzi, Westbrook 4		Pts: Carter 17; Rebs: Krupa 10; Asts: Cortez 4

Ivanofio, Thessaloniki
Attendance: 600
Referees: Nemanja Ninkovic (SRB), Ivana Ivanovic (SRB), Tolga Edis (TUR)

26 September 2024
17:30

Report

**CS Universitatea Cluj** (Romania)	**69**–60 (OT)	(Greece) Iraklis SC
Scoring by quarter: **13**–12, **15**–11, **19**–15, **16**–14, Overtime: 6–**8**
Pts: Carter 17; Rebs: Cortez 13; Asts: Stefanczyk 5		Pts: Dickie 26; Rebs: Dickie 10; Asts: Westbrook 3

BTarena, Cluj-Napoca
Attendance: 300
Referees: Cecília Montgomery-Tóth (HUN), Nataša Dragojević (MNE), Sandra Sánchez González (ESP)

Iraklis SC won 121–119 on aggregate

18 September 2024
18:00

Report

TFSE-MTK Budapest (Hungary)	57–**90**	(France) **UFAB 49**
Scoring by quarter: 12–**25**, 10–**17**, 14–**21**, 21–**27**
Pts: Manis 14; Rebs: Manis 8 Asts: Szabo 6		Pts: Dursus 16; Rebs: Merceron 9 Asts: Méndez 6

Dr. Koltai Jeno Sportközpont, Budapest
Attendance: 800
Referees: Josip Jurcevic (CRO), Veronika Vavrova (CZE), Danilo Petkovic (SRB)

25 September 2024
20:00

Report

**UFAB 49** (France)	**83**–77	(Hungary) TFSE-MTK Budapest
Scoring by quarter: 16–**20**, **18**–17, **29**–24, **20**–16
Pts: Tahane 16; Rebs: four players 6 Asts: Méndez 6		Pts: Prechtel 25; Rebs: Prechtel 6 Asts: T. Dul, P. Dul 5

Salle Jean Bouin, Angers
Attendance: 1,600
Referees: Sonia Teixeira (POR), Polat Parlak (TUR), Emma Perry (IRL)

UFAB 49 won 173–134 on aggregate

== See also ==
- 2024–25 EuroLeague Women
- 2024–25 EuroCup Women
- 2024–25 EuroCup Women knockout stage
- 2024 FIBA Europe SuperCup Women
- 2024–25 EuroLeague Women regular season
- 2024–25 EuroLeague Women qualification round
