= 2024–25 EuroCup Women =

European women's basketball tournament

EuroCup Women
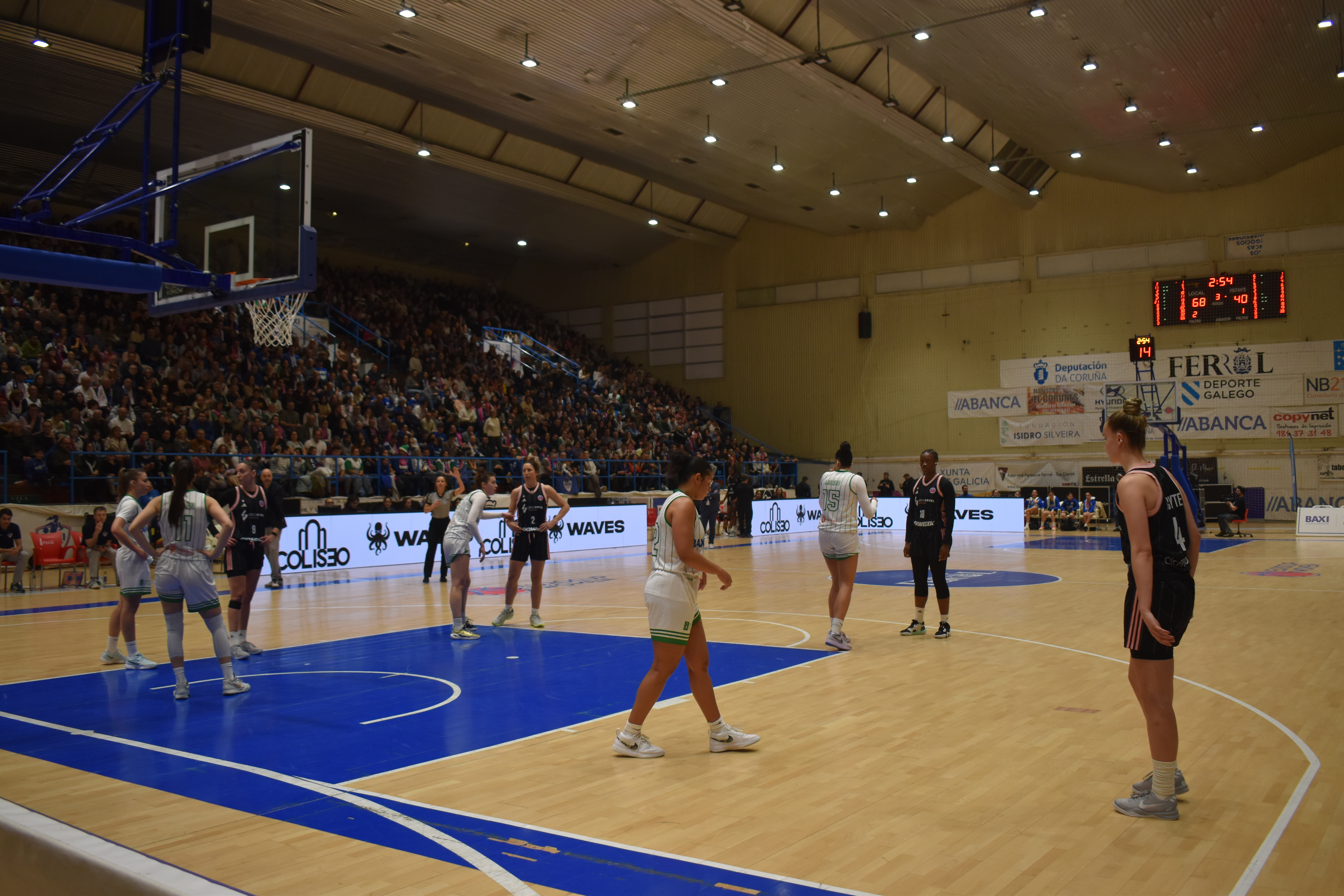
- Baxi Ferrol - LDLC ASVEL Féminin, semifinals
- Season: 2024–25
- Dates: Qualifying: 19–26 September 2024; Regular season: 10 October – 28 November 2024; Knockout stage: 12 December 2024 – 2 April 2025
- Teams: Competition proper: 48; Total: 53 (from 22 countries)

Finals
- Champions: (France) ESB Villeneuve-d'Ascq (2nd title)
- Runners-up: (Spain) Baxi Ferrol
- Finals MVP: (France) Carla Leite

Statistical leaders
- Points: (United States) Sparkle Taylor (304 points)
- Rebounds: (France) Dominique Malonga (154 rebounds)
- Assists: (Australia) Stephanie Reid (88 assists)

Records
- Biggest home win: Tarbes GB 106–39 Iraklis SC (28 November 2024)
- Biggest away win: Iraklis SC 33–119 Tarbes GB (24 October 2024)
- Highest scoring: TARR KSC Szekszárd 106–98 Movistar Estudiantes (27 November 2024)
- Highest attendance: 3,766; Baxi Ferrol 75–78 ESB Villeneuve-d'Ascq (26 April 2025)
- Lowest attendance: 40; Yerevan Foxes 71–99 La Molisana Campobasso (24 October 2024)

The 2024–25 EuroCup Women is the 23rd edition of FIBA Europe's second-tier international competition for women's basketball clubs under such name.

London Lions are the defending champions, but didn't defend their title after not entering European competitions this season due to financial reasons.

ESB Villeneuve-d'Ascq won their second title after beating Baxi Ferrol in the final.

== Format ==
After the qualifiers, 48 teams are divided into 12 groups of 4. with the top 2 plus the 4 best third place teams advancing to the knockout stage. In the knockout stage, the 28 teams, plus the 4 who dropped down from the Euroleague Women, are seeded based on their results in the regular season. Each tie in the knockout stage is played in a home and away format, where the winner on aggregate wins the tie and advances to the next round.

== Rankings ==
The results are based on the results of the past three seasons.

- Associations 1–5 can register five teams.
- Associations 6–10 can register four teams.
- Associations below the top 10 can register three teams.

Rank	Association	Average points	Teams
1	Turkey	250.00	3
2	France	170.67	5 + 1
3	Spain	164.67	5
4	Hungary	113.33	4 + 2
5	Italy	103.33	4
6	Czech Republic	82.67	2
7	Poland	56.00	4
8	Russia	42.00	0
9	Belgium	28.67	3
10	Greece	21.67	4 + 1
11	(United Kingdom) Great Britain	21.33	1
12	Latvia	20.00	1
12	Israel	20.00	1
14	Romania	14.67	3

Rank	Association	Average points	Teams
15	Slovakia	12.00	1
16	Portugal	8.00	2
16	Switzerland	8.00	1
18	Luxembourg	6.00	0
19	Serbia	5.33	1
20	Ukraine	5.00	0
21	Germany	4.67	3
21	Lithuania	4.67	2
23	Croatia	3.33	0
24	Belarus	2.00	0
25	Bulgaria	1.33	0
25	Iceland	1.33	0
27	Norway	0.67	0
27	Sweden	0.67	0

Unranked Federations
Rank	Association	Average points	Teams
1	Armenia	0.00	1
2	Cyprus	0.00	1
3	Finland	0.00	1

== Teams ==
The teams were announced on 9 July 2024. The teams with the S in the qualifying round means they were seeded. Teams with EL took part in the EuroLeague Women Qualification round Play Off or the regular season.

Play Off Round 1
(Hungary) DVTK HUN-Therm ^{EL}	(Greece) Olympiacos SFP ^{EL}	(France) ESB Villeneuve-d'Ascq ^{EL}	(Hungary) Uni Győr ^{EL}
Regular season
(Hungary) TARR KSC Szekszárd ^{EL}	(Romania) CSM Constanța ^{EL}	(Turkey) Beşiktaş ^{EL}	(Armenia) Yerevan Foxes (1st)
(Belgium) Kangoeroes Basket Mechelen (1st)	(Belgium) Castors Braine (2nd)	(Belgium) Basket Namur Capitale (3rd)	(Cyprus) AEL Limassol WBC (1st)
(Czech Republic) KP TANY Brno (3rd)	(Czech Republic) Levharti Chomutov (6th)	(Finland) Peli-Karhut (2nd)	(France) BLMA (3rd)
(France) Tarbes GB (4th)	(France) Charnay Basket (6th)	(France) LDLC ASVEL Feminin (7th)	(Germany) ALBA Berlin (1st)
(Germany) Rutronik Stars Keltern (2nd)	(United Kingdom) Caledonia Gladiators (3rd)	(Greece) Panathinaikos AC (2nd)	(Greece) Proteas Voulas AEO (4th)
(Hungary) Sopron Basket (4th)	(Hungary) NKA Universitas PEAC (5th)	(Israel) Elitzur Landco Ramla (1st)	(Italy) La Molisana Campobasso (3rd)
(Italy) GEAS Basket (6th)	(Latvia) TTT Riga (1st)	(Lithuania) Kibirkštis (1st)	(Lithuania) BC Neptunas-Amberton (3rd)
(Poland) InvestInTheWest Enea Gorzow (2nd)	(Poland) VBW Arka Gdynia (3rd)	(Poland) MB Zagłębie Sosnowiec (5th)	(Poland) AZS UMCS Lublin (6th)
(Portugal) SL Benfica (1st)	(Portugal) Sportiva/AzorisHotels (2nd)	(Romania) ACS Sepsi SIC (3rd)	(Serbia) Crvena zvezda (2nd)
(Slovakia) Piešťanské Čajky (1st)	(Spain) Spar Girona (4th)	(Spain) Hozono Global Jairis CB (5th)	(Spain) Movistar Estudiantes (6th)
(Spain) IDK Euskotren (7th)	(Switzerland) BCF Elfic Fribourg (1st)	(Turkey) Galatasaray Cagdas Faktoring (4th)	
Qualification round
(France) UFAB 49 ^{S} (8th)	(Germany) GiroLive Panthers Osnabrück (6th)	(Greece) Pas Giannina (5th)	(Greece) Iraklis SC (6th)
(Hungary) TFSE-MTK Budapest (7th)	(Italy) BDS Dinamo Sassari ^{S} (9th)	(Italy) O.ME.P.S. Battipaglia (12th)	(Romania) CS Universitatea Cluj ^{S} (5th)
(Spain) Baxi Ferrol ^{S} (8th)	(Turkey) Bodrum Basketbol ^{S} (2nd in TKBL) (Note: Bodrum Basketbol played in the Second division last season and were promoted.)		

== Schedule ==
Phase	Round	Dates
Qualification round	Matchday 1	19 September 2024
Qualification round	Matchday 2	26 September 2024
Regular season	Matchday 1	10 October 2024
Regular season	Matchday 2	17 October 2024
Regular season	Matchday 3	24 October 2024
Regular season	Matchday 4	30 October 2024
Regular season	Matchday 5	21 November 2024
Regular season	Matchday 6	28 November 2024
Play-off round 1	Matchday 1	12 December 2024
Play-off round 1	Matchday 2	19 December 2024
Round of 16	Matchday 1	9 January 2025
Round of 16	Matchday 2	16 January 2025
Quarterfinals	Matchday 1	20 February 2025
Quarterfinals	Matchday 2	27 February 2025
Semifinals	Matchday 1	6 March 2025
Semifinals	Matchday 2	13 March 2025
Finals	Matchday 1	27 March 2025
Finals	Matchday 2	3 April 2025

== Draw ==
The seeding was announced on the 15 July 2024. The draw was on the 18 July 2024. The seeding was decided by the FIBA Club Rankings. The only restriction was that clubs from the same country could not be drawn into the same group.

Pot 1	Pot 2	Pot 3	Pot 4
(N/A) EL Play-Off Loser 1 (Note: The eventual team in this slot was TARR KSC Szekszárd.) (N/A) EL Play-Off Loser 2 (Note: The eventual team in this slot was CSM Constanța.) (N/A) EL Play-Off Loser 3 (Note: The eventual team in this slot was Beşiktaş.) (Hungary) Sopron Basket (Spain) Spar Girona (France) LDLC ASVEL Féminin (Turkey) Galatasaray Cagdas Faktoring (France) BLMA (Latvia) TTT Riga (Poland) AZS UMCS Lublin (Romania) ACS Sepsi SIC (Poland) VBW Arka Gdynia	(Belgium) Castors Braine (Israel) Elitzur Landco Ramla (Belgium) Kangoeroes Basket Mechelen (Hungary) NKA Universitas Pecs (Switzerland) BCF Elfic Fribourg (Poland) InvestInTheWest Enea Gorzow (Spain) Movistar Estudiantes (Czech Republic) KP TANY Brno (Belgium) Basket Namur Capitale (Greece) Panathinaikos AC (Serbia) Crvena zvezda (Slovakia) Piešťanské Čajky	(Germany) Rutronik Stars Keltern (Lithuania) Kibirkštis (Portugal) SL Benfica (France) Tarbes GB (Poland) MB Zagłębie Sosnowiec (United Kingdom) Caledonia Gladiators (Spain) IDK Euskotren (Portugal) Sportiva/AzorisHotels (Czech Republic) Levharti Chomutov (Italy) La Molisana Campobasso (France) Charnay Basket (Spain) Hozono Global Jairis CB	(Italy) GEAS Basket (Greece) Proteas Voulas AEO (Germany) ALBA Berlin (Lithuania) BC Neptunas-Amberton (Armenia) Yerevan Foxes (Cyprus) AEL Limassol WBC (Finland) Peli-Karhut (N/A) Play Off Winner 1 (Note: The eventual team in this slot was BDS Dinamo Sassari.) (N/A) Play Off Winner 2 (Note: The eventual team in this slot was Bodrum Basketbol.) (N/A) Play Off Winner 3 (Note: The eventual team in this slot was Baxi Ferrol.) (N/A) Play Off Winner 4 (Note: The eventual team in this slot was Iraklis SC.) (N/A) Play Off Winner 5 (Note: The eventual team in this slot was UFAB 49.)

== Qualification round ==
The draw for the qualification round was conducted on 18 July 2024. The first legs were held on 19 September 2023 while the second legs were held on 26 September 2023.

Team 1	Agg.	Team 2	1st leg	2nd leg
Pas Giannina (Greece)	113–175	(Italy) BDS Dinamo Sassari	63–80	50–95
GiroLive Panthers Osnabrück (Germany)	102–148	(Turkey) Bodrum Basketbol	36–78	66–70
O.ME.P.S. Battipaglia (Italy)	92–178	(Spain) Baxi Ferrol	47–89	45–89
Iraklis SC (Greece)	121–119	(Romania) CS Universitatea Cluj	61–50	60–69 OT
TFSE-MTK Budapest (Hungary)	134–173	(France) UFAB 49	57–90	77–83

== Regular season ==
Location of teams of the 2024–25 EuroCup Women regular season.
Brown: Group A; Green: Group B; Deep Pink: Group C; Yellow: Group D;
Red: Group E; Cyan: Group F; Blue: Group G; Purple: Group H;
Pink: Group I; Turquoise: Group J; Spring Green: Group K; Orange: Group L.

48 teams are divided into 12 groups of 4, where the top 2, plus the four best third placed teams, advance to play-off round 1.

This season, Peli-Karhut, ALBA Berlin, Proteas Voulas AEO, La Molisana Campobasso, GEAS Basket, Hozono Global Jairis CB, Baxi Ferrol, Bodrum Basketbol and Iraklis SC all make their debut in the regular season.

22 national associations will be represented this season, up by two compared to 2023–24. Finland will make their debut this season, Armenia and Cyprus are both present for the first time since 2009–10, while Serbia returns after being absent last season. Croatia and Luxembourg are not present in the regular season this year.

Tiebreakers

If teams are level on record at the end of the regular season, tiebreakers are applied in the following order:

1. Head-to-head record
2. Head-to-head point differential
3. Head-to-head points scored
4. Point differential for the entire regular season
5. Points scored for the entire regular season

Location of teams in 2024–25 EuroCup Women regular season (Azores).
Turquoise: Group J.

=== Group A ===
Pos	Team	Pld	W	L	PF	PA	PD	Pts	Qualification	ASV	GOR	LEV	LIM
1	(France) LDLC ASVEL Féminin	6	6	0	560	337	+223	12	Play-off Round 1	—	100–79	86–50	115–54
2	(Poland) InvestInTheWest Enea Gorzow	6	3	3	490	422	+68	9 (Note: InvestInTheWest Enea Gorzow 165–149 Levharti Chomutov)	Play-off Round 1	63–73	—	81–59	91–52
3	(Czech Republic) Levharti Chomutov	6	3	3	420	451	−31	9		47–89	90–84	—	90–34
4	(Cyprus) AEL Limassol WBC	6	0	6	309	569	−260	6		44–97	48–92	77–84	—

Source: FIBA
Rules for classification: 1) Points; 2) Head-to-head record; 3) Head-to-head point differential. 4) General point differential 5) Points scored

=== Group B ===
Pos	Team	Pld	W	L	PF	PA	PD	Pts	Qualification	JAI	UFAB	LUB	PAN
1	(Spain) Hozono Global Jairis CB	6	6	0	506	365	+141	12	Play-off Round 1	—	74–57	76–63	101–54
2	(France) UFAB 49	6	4	2	467	414	+53	10	Play-off Round 1	66–80	—	92–69	77–55
3	(Poland) AZS UMCS Lublin	6	2	4	394	464	−70	8		58–83	61–89	—	80–62
4	(Greece) Panathinaikos AC	6	0	6	375	499	−124	6		67–92	75–86	62–63	—

Source: FIBA
Rules for classification: 1) Points; 2) Head-to-head record; 3) Head-to-head point differential. 4) General point differential 5) Points scored

=== Group C ===
Pos	Team	Pld	W	L	PF	PA	PD	Pts	Qualification	EUS	CRV	SEP	PRO
1	(Spain) IDK Euskotren	6	6	0	438	340	+98	12	Play-off Round 1	—	70–64	68–53	85–43
2	(Serbia) Crvena zvezda	6	4	2	456	373	+83	10	Play-off Round 1	78–80	—	76–70	93–53
3	(Romania) ACS Sepsi SIC	6	1	5	380	418	−38	7 (Note: ACS Sepsi SIC 141–140 AEO Proteas Voulas)		54–62	62–72	—	70–63
4	(Greece) AEO Proteas Voulas	6	1	5	322	465	−143	7		48–73	38–73	77–71	—

Source: FIBA
Rules for classification: 1) Points; 2) Head-to-head record; 3) Head-to-head point differential. 4) General point differential 5) Points scored

=== Group D ===
Pos	Team	Pld	W	L	PF	PA	PD	Pts	Qualification	BLMA	NEP	FRI	GLA
1	(France) BLMA	6	6	0	499	339	+160	12	Play-off Round 1	—	74–53	93–60	83–55
2	(Lithuania) BC Neptunas-Amberton	6	3	3	397	391	+6	9 (Note: BC Neptunas-Amberton 127–123 BCF Elfic Fribourg)	Play-off Round 1	62–74	—	68–55	88–56
3	(Switzerland) BCF Elfic Fribourg	6	3	3	389	438	−49	9		58–78	68–59	—	82–78
4	(United Kingdom) Caledonia Gladiators	6	0	6	366	483	−117	6		51–97	64–67	62–66	—

Source: FIBA
Rules for classification: 1) Points; 2) Head-to-head record; 3) Head-to-head point differential. 4) General point differential 5) Points scored

=== Group E ===
Pos	Team	Pld	W	L	PF	PA	PD	Pts	Qualification	SOP	CHA	BOD	PIE
1	(Hungary) Sopron Basket	6	5	1	450	361	+89	11	Play-off Round 1	—	75–63	66–71	74–47
2	(France) Charnay Basket	6	4	2	415	364	+51	10	Play-off Round 1	53–71	—	84–53	81–53
3	(Turkey) Bodrum Basketbol	6	3	3	427	448	−21	9		80–86	66–76	—	78–73
4	(Slovakia) Piešťanské Čajky	6	0	6	329	448	−119	6		47–78	46–58	63–79	—

Source: FIBA
Rules for classification: 1) Points; 2) Head-to-head record; 3) Head-to-head point differential. 4) General point differential 5) Points scored

=== Group F ===
Pos	Team	Pld	W	L	PF	PA	PD	Pts	Qualification	CAS	RUT	CON	PEL
1	(Belgium) Castors Braine	6	4	2	453	436	+17	10 (Note: Castors Braine 145–143 Rutronik Stars Keltern)	Play-off Round 1	—	66–71	79–74	64–65
2	(Germany) Rutronik Stars Keltern	6	4	2	478	422	+56	10	Play-off Round 1	72–79	—	86–67	89–59
3	(Romania) CSM Constanța	6	3	3	471	470	+1	9	Play-off Round 1	74–78	87–72	—	74–70
4	(Finland) Peli-Karhut	6	1	5	423	497	−74	7		80–87	64–88	85–95	—

Source: FIBA
Rules for classification: 1) Points; 2) Head-to-head record; 3) Head-to-head point differential. 4) General point differential 5) Points scored

=== Group G ===
Pos	Team	Pld	W	L	PF	PA	PD	Pts	Qualification	TAR	MOV	SZE	IRA
1	(France) Tarbes GB	6	5	1	527	311	+216	11	Play-off Round 1	—	87–60	86–53	106–39
2	(Spain) Movistar Estudiantes	6	4	2	532	399	+133	10	Play-off Round 1	67–61	—	96–66	102–38
3	(Hungary) TARR KSC Szekszárd	6	3	3	498	420	+78	9	Play-off Round 1	59–68	106–98	—	103–38
4	(Greece) Iraklis SC	6	0	6	223	650	−427	6		33–119	41–109	34–111	—

Source: FIBA
Rules for classification: 1) Points; 2) Head-to-head record; 3) Head-to-head point differential. 4) General point differential 5) Points scored

=== Group H ===
Pos	Team	Pld	W	L	PF	PA	PD	Pts	Qualification	ARK	KIR	RAM	ALBA
1	(Poland) VBW Arka Gdynia	6	5	1	467	403	+64	11	Play-off Round 1	—	80–73	80–67	87–71
2	(Lithuania) Kibirkštis	6	3	3	433	428	+5	9 (Note: Kibirkštis 157–147 Elitzur Landco Ramla)	Play-off Round 1	66–80	—	72–80	80–68
3	(Israel) Elitzur Landco Ramla	6	3	3	435	451	−16	9	Play-off Round 1	82–79	67–85	—	71–76
4	(Germany) ALBA Berlin	6	1	5	371	424	−53	7		44–61	53–57	59–68	—

Source: FIBA
Rules for classification: 1) Points; 2) Head-to-head record; 3) Head-to-head point differential. 4) General point differential 5) Points scored

=== Group I ===
Pos	Team	Pld	W	L	PF	PA	PD	Pts	Qualification	SOS	DIN	MEC	TTT
1	(Poland) MB Zagłębie Sosnowiec	6	6	0	477	380	+97	12	Play-off Round 1	—	83–74	88–55	81–56
2	(Italy) BDS Dinamo Sassari	6	4	2	445	407	+38	10	Play-off Round 1	62–70	—	64–60	83–74
3	(Belgium) Kangoeroes Basket Mechelen	6	1	5	394	444	−50	7 (Note: Kangoeroes Basket Mechelen 140–135 TTT Riga)		79–81	60–76	—	63–64
4	(Latvia) TTT Riga	6	1	5	379	464	−85	7		54–74	60–86	71–77	—

Source: FIBA
Rules for classification: 1) Points; 2) Head-to-head record; 3) Head-to-head point differential. 4) General point differential 5) Points scored

=== Group J ===
Pos	Team	Pld	W	L	PF	PA	PD	Pts	Qualification	GAL	FER	BRN	SPO
1	(Turkey) Galatasaray Cagdas Faktoring	6	5	1	514	363	+151	11 (Note: Galatasaray Cagdas Faktoring 152–139 Baxi Ferrol)	Play-off Round 1	—	69–73	110–62	84–52
2	(Spain) Baxi Ferrol	6	5	1	455	353	+102	11	Play-off Round 1	66–83	—	79–59	82–45
3	(Czech Republic) KP TANY Brno	6	2	4	375	466	−91	8		66–92	59–73	—	56–49
4	(Portugal) Sportiva/AzorisHotels	6	0	6	291	453	−162	6		44–76	38–82	63–73	—

Source: FIBA
Rules for classification: 1) Points; 2) Head-to-head record; 3) Head-to-head point differential. 4) General point differential 5) Points scored

=== Group K ===
Pos	Team	Pld	W	L	PF	PA	PD	Pts	Qualification	BES	GEAS	BEN	NAM
1	(Turkey) Beşiktaş	6	6	0	508	366	+142	12	Play-off Round 1	—	82–71	90–55	103–63
2	(Italy) GEAS Basket	6	4	2	450	362	+88	10	Play-off Round 1	49–63	—	92–58	81–49
3	(Portugal) SL Benfica	6	1	5	387	465	−78	7 (Note: SL Benfica 152–128 Basket Namur Capitale)		55–76	67–79	—	77–52
4	(Belgium) Basket Namur Capitale	6	1	5	356	508	−152	7		73–94	43–78	76–75	—

Source: FIBA
Rules for classification: 1) Points; 2) Head-to-head record; 3) Head-to-head point differential. 4) General point differential 5) Points scored

=== Group L ===
Pos	Team	Pld	W	L	PF	PA	PD	Pts	Qualification	GIR	MAG	NKA	YER
1	(Spain) Spar Girona	6	5	1	525	398	+127	11	Play-off Round 1	—	74–66	79–72	96–35
2	(Italy) La Molisana Campobasso	6	4	2	494	411	+83	10	Play-off Round 1	97–90	—	72–65	103–38
3	(Hungary) NKA Universitas PEAC	6	3	3	505	379	+126	9	Play-off Round 1	71–74	73–57	—	122–55
4	(Armenia) Yerevan Foxes	6	0	6	298	634	−336	6		57–112	71–99	42–102	—

Source: FIBA
Rules for classification: 1) Points; 2) Head-to-head record; 3) Head-to-head point differential. 4) General point differential 5) Points scored

=== Ranking of third place teams ===
Pos	Grp	Team	Pld	W	L	PF	PA	PD	Pts	Qualification
1	L	(Hungary) NKA Universitas PEAC	6	3	3	505	379	+126	9	Play-off Round 1
2	G	(Hungary) TARR KSC Szekszárd	6	3	3	498	420	+78	9	Play-off Round 1
3	F	(Romania) CMS Constanța	6	3	3	471	470	+1	9	Play-off Round 1
4	H	(Israel) Elitzur Landco Ramla	6	3	3	435	451	−16	9	Play-off Round 1
5	E	(Turkey) Bodrum Basketbol	6	3	3	427	448	−21	9	
6	A	(Czech Republic) Levharti Chomutov	6	3	3	420	451	−31	9	
7	D	(Switzerland) BCF Elfic Fribourg	6	3	3	389	438	−49	9	
8	B	(Poland) AZS UMCS Lublin	6	2	4	394	464	−70	8	
9	J	(Czech Republic) KP TANY Brno	6	2	4	375	466	−91	8	
10	C	(Romania) ACS Sepsi SIC	6	1	5	380	418	−38	7	
11	I	(Belgium) Kangoeroes Basket Mechelen	6	1	5	394	444	−50	7	
12	K	(Portugal) SL Benfica	6	1	5	387	465	−78	7	

Source: FIBA
Rules for classification: 1) Points; 2) Points difference; 3) Points scored.

== Knockout stage ==
=== Seeding ===
The seeding was based on the results of the previous round. The four eliminated teams from the EuroLeague Women were pre-seeded into positions 1–4.

Seed	Grp	Team	Pld	W	L	PF	PA	PD	Pts	Qualification
1	A	(Hungary) DVTK HUN-Therm	6	1	5	356	390	−34	7	EuroLeague Women
2	B	(France) ESB Villeneuve-d'Ascq	6	1	5	402	486	−84	7	EuroLeague Women
3	C	(Hungary) Uni Győr	6	0	6	404	485	−81	6	EuroLeague Women
4	D	(Greece) Olympiacos SFP	6	0	6	365	507	−142	6	EuroLeague Women
5	A	(France) LDLC ASVEL Féminin	6	6	0	560	337	+223	12	First place
6	D	(France) BLMA	6	6	0	499	339	+160	12	First place
7	K	(Turkey) Beşiktaş	6	6	0	508	366	+142	12	First place
8	B	(Spain) Hozono Global Jairis CB	6	6	0	506	365	+141	12	First place
9	C	(Spain) IDK Euskotren	6	6	0	438	340	+98	12	First place
10	I	(Poland) MB Zagłębie Sosnowiec	6	6	0	477	380	+97	12	First place
11	G	(France) Tarbes GB	6	5	1	527	311	+216	11	First place
12	J	(Turkey) Galatasaray Cagdas Faktoring	6	5	1	514	363	+151	11	First place
13	L	(Spain) Spar Girona	6	5	1	525	398	+127	11	First place
14	E	(Hungary) Sopron Basket	6	5	1	450	361	+89	11	First place
15	H	(Poland) VBW Arka Gdynia	6	5	1	467	403	+64	11	First place
16	F	(Belgium) Castors Braine	6	4	2	453	436	+17	10	First place
17	J	(Spain) Baxi Ferrol	6	5	1	455	353	+102	11	Second place
18	G	(Spain) Movistar Estudiantes	6	4	2	532	399	+133	10	Second place
19	K	(Italy) GEAS Basket	6	4	2	450	362	+88	10	Second place
20	L	(Italy) La Molisana Campobasso	6	4	2	494	411	+83	10	Second place
21	C	(Serbia) Crvena zvezda	6	4	2	456	373	+83	10	Second place
22	F	(Germany) Rutronik Stars Keltern	6	4	2	478	422	+56	10	Second place
23	B	(France) UFAB 49	6	4	2	467	414	+53	10	Second place
24	E	(France) Charnay Basket	6	4	2	415	364	+51	10	Second place
25	I	(Italy) BDS Dinamo Sassari	6	4	2	445	407	+38	10	Second place
26	A	(Poland) InvestInTheWest Enea Gorzów Wielkopolski	6	3	3	490	422	+68	9	Second place
27	D	(Lithuania) BC Neptūnas-Amberton	6	3	3	397	391	+6	9	Second place
28	H	(Lithuania) Kibirkštis	6	3	3	433	428	+5	9	Second place
29	L	(Hungary) NKA Universitas PEAC	6	3	3	505	379	+126	9	Third place
30	G	(Hungary) TARR KSC Szekszárd	6	3	3	498	420	+78	9	Third place
31	F	(Romania) CSM Constanța	6	3	3	471	470	+1	9	Third place
32	H	(Israel) Elitzur Landco Ramla	6	3	3	435	451	−16	9	Third place

Source: FIBA
Rules for classification: 1) Points; 2) Points difference; 3) Points scored.

=== Bracket ===
Play-off Round 1
21	(Serbia) Crvena zvezda	72	75	147
12	(Turkey) Galatasaray Cagdas Faktoring	95	82	177
28	(Lithuania) Kibirkštis	85	67	152
5	(France) LDLC ASVEL Féminin	85	69	154
20	(Italy) La Molisana Campobasso	73	71	144
13	(Spain) Spar Girona	75	82	157
29	(Hungary) NKA Universitas Pecs	85	75	160
4	(Greece) Olympiacos SFP	63	93	156
24	(France) Charnay Basket	68	66	134
9	(Spain) IDK Euskotren	68	73	141
25	(Italy) BDS Dinamo Sassari	60	71	131
8	(Spain) Hozono Global Jairis	54	74	128
17	(Spain) Baxi Ferrol	83	97	180
16	(Belgium) Castors Braine	58	75	133
32	(Israel) Elitzur Landco Ramla	75	71	146
1	(Hungary) DVTK HUN-Therm	81	77	158
22	(Germany) Rutronik Stars Keltern	60	71	131
11	(France) Tarbes GB	45	50	95
27	(Lithuania) BC Neptūnas-Amberton	60	55	115
6	(France) BLMA	96	65	161
19	(Italy) GEAS Basket	66	45	111
14	(Hungary) Sopron Basket	79	64	143
30	(Hungary) KSC Szekszárd	77	73	150
3	(Hungary) Uni Győr	92	98	190
23	(France) UFAB 49	86	90	176
10	(Poland) MB Zagłębie Sosnowiec	60	88	148
26	(Poland) InvestInTheWest Enea Gorzów Wielkopolski	64	71	135
7	(Turkey) Beşiktaş	80	80	160
18	(Spain) Movistar Estudiantes	82	59	141
15	(Poland) VBW Arka Gdynia	77	59	136
31	(Romania) CSM Constanța	69	71	140
2	(France) ESB Villeneuve-d'Ascq	88	91	179

Round of 16
12	(Turkey) Galatasaray Cagdas Faktoring	77	56	133
5	(France) LDLC ASVEL Féminin	72	87	159
13	(Spain) Spar Girona	73	88	161
29	(Hungary) NKA Universitas Pecs	85	65	150
9	(Spain) IDK Euskotren	50	71	121
25	(Italy) BDS Dinamo Sassari	60	83	143
17	(Spain) Baxi Ferrol	78	60	138
1	(Hungary) DVTK Hun-Therm	73	60	133
22	(Germany) Rutronik Stars Keltern	62	45	107
6	(France) BLMA	56	63	119
14	(Hungary) Sopron Basket	89	80	169
3	(Hungary) Uni Győr	83	62	145
23	(France) UFAB 49	52	76	128
7	(Turkey) Beşiktaş	64	66	130
18	(Spain) Movistar Estudiantes	75	90	165
2	(France) ESB Villeneuve-d'Ascq	65	108	173

Quarterfinals
5	(France) LDLC ASVEL Féminin	72	72	144
13	(Spain) Spar Girona	77	51	128
25	(Italy) BDS Dinamo Sassari	76	70	146
17	(Spain) Baxi Ferrol	95	89	184
6	(France) BLMA	54	69	123
14	(Hungary) Sopron Basket	81	57	138
7	(Turkey) Beşiktaş	72	81	153
2	(France) ESB Villeneuve-d'Ascq	91	81	172

Semifinals
5	(France) LDLC ASVEL Féminin	62	74	136
17	(Spain) Baxi Ferrol	93	63	156
14	(Hungary) Sopron Basket	66	46	112
2	(France) ESB Villeneuve-d'Ascq	73	54	127

Final
17	(Spain) Baxi Ferrol	75	70	145
2	(France) ESB Villeneuve-d'Ascq	78	84	162

=== Play-off Round 1 ===
The first legs were played on 11 and 12 December, and the second legs were played on 17 and 19 December 2024.

Team 1	Agg.	Team 2	1st leg	2nd leg
Elitzur Landco Ramla (Israel)	146–158	(Hungary) DVTK HUN-Therm	75–81	71–77
CSM Constanța (Romania)	140–179	(France) ESB Villeneuve-d'Ascq	69–88	71–91
KSC Szekszárd (Hungary)	150–190	(Hungary) Uni Győr	77–92	73–98
NKA Universitas PEAC (Hungary)	160–156	(Greece) Olympiacos SFP	85–63	75–93
Kibirkštis (Lithuania)	152–154	(France) LDLC ASVEL Féminin	85–85	67–69
BC Neptūnas-Amberton (Lithuania)	115–161 (Note: Order of legs reversed.)	(France) BLMA	60–96	55–65
InvestInTheWest Enea Gorzów Wielkopolski (Poland)	135–160	(Turkey) Beşiktaş	64–80	71–80
BDS Dinamo Sassari (Italy)	131–128	(Spain) Hozono Global Jairis	60–54	71–74
Charnay Basket (France)	134–141	(Spain) IDK Euskotren	68–68	66–73
UFAB 49 (France)	176–148	(Poland) MB Zagłębie Sosnowiec	86–60	90–88
Rutronik Stars Keltern (Germany)	131–95	(France) Tarbes GB	60–45	71–50
Crvena zvezda (Serbia)	147–177	(Turkey) Galatasaray Cagdas Faktoring	72–95	75–82
La Molisana Campobasso (Italy)	144–157	(Spain) Spar Girona	73–75	71–82
GEAS Basket (Italy)	111–143	(Hungary) Sopron Basket	66–79	45–64
Movistar Estudiantes (Spain)	141–136	(Poland) VBW Arka Gdynia	82–77	59–59
Baxi Ferrol (Spain)	180–133	(Belgium) Castors Braine	83–58	97–75

=== Round of 16 ===
The first legs were played on 7 and 8 January, and the second legs were played on 14 and 15 January 2025.

Team 1	Agg.	Team 2	1st leg	2nd leg
Baxi Ferrol (Spain)	138–133	(Hungary) DVTK HUN-Therm	78–73	60–60
Movistar Estudiantes (Spain)	165–173	(France) ESB Villeneuve-d'Ascq	75–65	90–108
Sopron Basket (Hungary)	169–145	(Hungary) Uni Győr	89–83	80–62
Spar Girona (Spain)	161–150 (Note: Order of legs reversed.)	(Hungary) NKA Universitas PEAC	73–85	88–65
Galatasaray Cagdas Faktoring (Turkey)	133–159	(France) LDLC ASVEL Féminin	77–72	56–87
Rutronik Stars Keltern (Germany)	107–119	(France) BLMA	62–56	45–63
UFAB 49 (France)	128–130	(Turkey) Beşiktaş	52–64	76–66
IDK Euskotren (Spain)	121–143 (Note: Order of legs reversed.)	(Italy) BDS Dinamo Sassari	50–60	71–83

=== Quarterfinals ===
The first legs were played on 20 February, and the second legs were played on 27 February 2025.

Team 1	Agg.	Team 2	1st leg	2nd leg
BDS Dinamo Sassari (Italy)	146–184	(Spain) Baxi Ferrol	76–95	70–89
Beşiktaş (Turkey)	153–172	(France) ESB Villeneuve-d'Ascq	72–91	81–81
BLMA (France)	123–138	(Hungary) Sopron Basket	54–81	69–57
LDLC ASVEL Féminin (France)	144–128	(Spain) Spar Girona	72–77	72–51

=== Semifinals ===
The first legs were played on 6 March, and the second legs were played on 13 March 2025.

Team 1	Agg.	Team 2	1st leg	2nd leg
ESB Villeneuve-d'Ascq (France)	127–112	(Hungary) Sopron Basket	73–66	54–46
LDLC ASVEL Féminin (France)	136–156	(Spain) Baxi Ferrol	62–93	74–63

=== Final ===
The first leg was played on 26 March, and the second leg was played on 2 April 2025.

Team 1	Agg.	Team 2	1st leg	2nd leg
Baxi Ferrol (Spain)	145–162	(France) ESB Villeneuve-d'Ascq	75–78	70–84

2024–25 EuroCup Women Champions

ESB Villeneuve-d'Ascq
Second title

== Awards ==
=== Finals MVP ===
Player	Team	Ref.
(France) Carla Leite	(France) ESB Villeneuve-d'Ascq	

=== MVP of the Month ===
Month	Player	Team	Ref.
October	(Poland) Kamila Borkowska	(Poland) MB Zagłębie Sosnowiec	
November	(France) Dominique Malonga	(France) LDLC ASVEL Féminin	
December	(Poland) Kamila Borkowska	(Poland) MB Zagłębie Sosnowiec	
January	(Spain) Angela Mataix	(Spain) Universitario de Ferrol	
February	(France) Dominique Malonga	(France) LDLC ASVEL Féminin	
March	(Republic of Ireland) Claire Melia	(Spain) Universitario de Ferrol	

=== MVP of the Round ===
==== Regular season ====
Round	PG	SG	SF	PF	C
1	(Spain) Aina Ayuso ( (Spain) Hozono Global Jairis)	(Poland) Kamila Borkowska ( (Poland) MB Zagłębie Sosnowiec)	(United States) Taylor Soule ( (Poland) MB Zagłębie Sosnowiec)	(Lithuania) Laura Miškinienė ( (Poland) AZS UMCS Lublin)	(United States Virgin Islands) Anisha George ( (Greece) Proteas Voulas AEO)
2	(Turkey) Gökşen Fitik ( (Turkey) Galatasaray Cagdas Faktoring)	(Poland) Anna Makurat ( (Italy) GEAS Basket)	(Poland) Liliana Banaszak ( (Spain) Movistar Estudiantes)	(United States) Ruthy Hebard ( (Poland) VBW Arka Gdynia)	(Nigeria) Murjanatu Musa ( (France) Tarbes GB)
3	(United States) Alexis Prince ( (Israel) Elitzur Landco Ramla)	(United States) Shatori Walker-Kimbrough ( (Poland) InvestInTheWest Enea Gorzow)	(Poland) Anna Makurat ( (Italy) GEAS Basket)	(Nigeria) Murjanatu Musa ( (France) Tarbes GB)	(Czech Republic) Kateřina Rokošová ( (Czech Republic) Levharti Chomutov)
4	(United States) Madi Williams ( (Serbia) Crvena zvezda)	(United States) Sparkle Taylor ( (Italy) BDS Dinamo Sassari)	(United States) Ruthy Hebard ( (Poland) VBW Arka Gdynia)	(Lithuania) Laura Miškinienė ( (Poland) AZS UMCS Lublin)	(China) Li Yueru ( (Turkey) Bodrum Basketbol)
5	(United States) Deeshyra Thomas ( (Germany) ALBA Berlin)	(United States) Shatori Walker-Kimbrough ( (Poland) InvestInTheWest Enea Gorzow)	(United States) Julie Wojta ( (France) LDLC ASVEL Feminin)	(Nigeria) Murjanatu Musa ( (France) Tarbes GB)	(United States) Cate Reese ( (Belgium) Kangoeroes Basket Mechelen)
6	(United States) Dana Evans ( (Turkey) Beşiktaş JK)	(Australia) Alexandra Sharp ( (Spain) Movistar Estudiantes)	(Australia) Marena Whittle ( (Hungary) KSC Szekszárd)	(United States) Kathryn Westbeld ( (Hungary) KSC Szekszárd)	(Czech Republic) Kateřina Rokošová ( (Czech Republic) Levharti Chomutov)

==== Playoffs ====
Play-off Round 1

Round	PG	SG	SF	PF	C
First leg	(Cameroon) Monique Akoa Makani ( (France) Charnay Basket)	(Slovenia) Zala Friškovec ( (Hungary) Sopron Basket)	(France) Garance Rabot ( (France) BLMA)	(United States) Ruthy Hebard ( (Poland) VBW Arka Gdynia)	(Poland) Kamila Borkowska ( (Poland) MB Zagłębie Sosnowiec)
Second leg	(United States) Sparkle Taylor ( (Italy) BDS Dinamo Sassari)	(United States) Delicia Washington ( (Spain) IDK Euskotren)	(Turkey) Elif Bayram ( (Turkey) Beşiktaş JK)	(Czech Republic) Julia Reisingerova ( (Hungary) NKA Universitas Pecs)	(Poland) Kamila Borkowska ( (Poland) MB Zagłębie Sosnowiec)

Round of 16

Round	PG	SG	SF	PF	C
First leg	(United States) Shaylee Gonzales ( (Italy) BDS Dinamo Sassari)	(Bulgaria) Borislava Hristova ( (Spain) Spar Girona)	(Spain) Ángela Mataix ( (Spain) Baxi Ferrol)	(Czech Republic) Julia Reisingerova ( (Hungary) NKA Universitas Pecs)	(United Kingdom) Temi Fagbenle ( (Turkey) Beşiktaş JK)
Second leg	(Sweden) Klara Lundquist ( (Spain) Spar Girona)	(Croatia) Shavonte Zellous ( (France) ESB Villeneuve-d'Ascq)	(United States) Sparkle Taylor ( (Italy) BDS Dinamo Sassari)	(Australia) Marena Whittle ( (Spain) Movistar Estudiantes)	(France) Aminata Guèye ( (France) ESB Villeneuve-d'Ascq )

Quarterfinals

Round	PG	SG	SF	PF	C
First leg	(France) Carla Leite ( (France) ESB Villeneuve-d’Ascq)	(United Kingdom) Holly Winterburn ( (Turkey) Beşiktaş JK)	(Spain) Noa Morro ( (Spain) Baxi Ferrol)	(United States) Natasha Mack ( (Spain) Spar Giron)	(France) Dominique Malonga ( (France) LDLC ASVEL Féminin)
Second leg	(Germany) Alexis Peterson ( (Turkey) Beşiktaş JK)	(Spain) Àngela Mataix ( (Spain) Baxi Ferrol)	(United States) Shavonte Zellous ( (France) ESB Villeneuve-d’Ascq)	(France) Aminata Gueye ( (France) ESB Villeneuve-d’Ascq)	(France) Dominique Malonga ( (France) LDLC ASVEL Féminin)

Semifinals

Round	PG	SG	SF	PF	C
First leg	(United States) Shavonte Zellous ( (France) ESB Villeneuve-d'Ascq)	(Czech Republic) Julie Pospíšilová ( (Spain) Baxi Ferrol)	(Spain) Blanca Millán ( (Spain) Baxi Ferrol)	(Serbia) Jelena Brooks ( (Hungary) Sopron Basket)	(Republic of Ireland) Claire Melia ( (Spain) Baxi Ferrol)
Second leg	(France) Carla Leite ( (France) ESB Villeneuve-d’Ascq)	(Czech Republic) Julie Pospíšilová ( (Spain) Baxi Ferrol)	(France) Aminata Gueye ( (France) ESB Villeneuve-d’Ascq)	(Spain) Laura Quevedo ( (France) LDLC ASVEL Féminin)	(France) Dominique Malonga ( (France) LDLC ASVEL Féminin)

== See also ==
- 2024–25 EuroLeague Women
- 2024–25 EuroLeague Women regular season
- 2024–25 EuroLeague Women qualification round
- 2024 FIBA Europe SuperCup Women
- 2024–25 EuroCup Basketball
