= Emily Kiser =

American basketball player (born 2000)

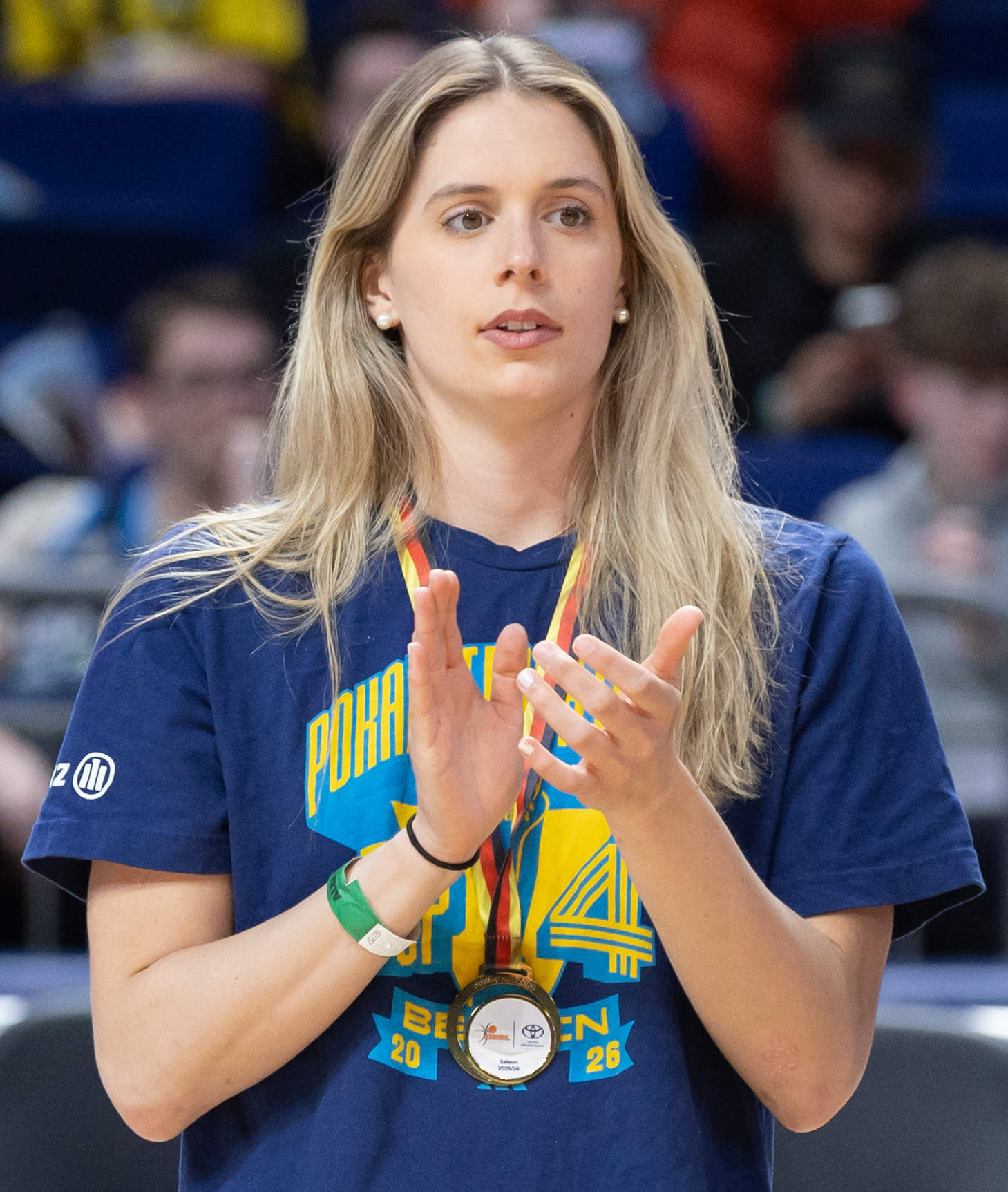
- Kiser with ALBA Berlin in 2026

No. 33 – Rockhampton Cyclones
- Position: Forward
- League: NBL1 North

Personal information
- Born: February 10, 2000 (age 26) Noblesville, Indiana, U.S.
- Listed height: 6 ft 2 in (1.88 m)

Career information
- High school: Noblesville (Noblesville, Indiana)
- College: Michigan (2018–2023)
- Playing career: 2023–present

Career history
- 2023–2024: A.O. Eleutheria Moschatou
- 2024–2026: Alba Berlin Frauen
- 2026–present: Rockhampton Cyclones

Career highlights
- NBL1 North All Star Five First Team (2026); First-team All-Big Ten (2023)

Emily Katherine Kiser (born February 10, 2000) is an American professional basketball player for the Rockhampton Cyclones of the NBL1 North. She played college basketball at Michigan.

== High school career ==
Kiser attended Noblesville High School where she played both volleyball and basketball. She was named a three-time Hoosier Crossroads All-Conference Team honoree. During her junior year in 2017, she averaged 19.6 points and 11.6 rebounds per game and was named to the Indiana Junior All-Star team.

During her senior year in 2018, she averaged 21 points and 13.4 rebounds for the Millers. She had two games with at least 20 points and 20 rebounds and had a triple-double against New Palestine with 18 points, 13 rebounds and 10 assists. Following the season she was named to the IndyStar Indiana Girls All-Stars team. She finished her career with 1,328 points and 927 rebounds, setting the Noblesville record for career rebounds.

She also played volleyball, and during her senior year she led her team in blocks and ranked third in kills, and helped the Millers to a regional final.

== College career ==
Kiser began her collegiate at Michigan during the 2018–19 season. In her freshman year, she appeared in 18 games, averaging 1.9 points and 1.6 rebounds in 5.2 minutes per game. During the 2019–20 season, in her sophomore year, she appeared in 29 games off the bench, averaging 3.0 points and 1.3 rebounds in 8.5 minutes per game. During the 2020–21 season, in her junior year, she appeared in 17 games off the bench, averaging 2.4 points and 2.6 rebounds in 12.5 minutes per game.

After coming off the bench her first three years at Michigan, she became a starter during her senior year. During the 2021–22 season, in her senior year, she was one of two Wolverines to start all 32 games, averaging 9.3 points, 8.1 rebounds and 1.8 assists in 31.2 minutes per game. Her 9.3 points per game ranked third on the team, while her 8.1 rebounds per game ranked second on the team. She recorded 15 double-figure scoring efforts and four double-doubles. On November 16, 2021, she recorded her first career double-double with 13 points and 11 rebounds in a win against UMass Lowell.

On May 26, 2022, Kiser announced she would use her fifth-year of eligibility due to the COVID-19 pandemic and return to Michigan. During the 2022–23 season, in her fifth-year, she started all 33 games, averaging 15.9 points and 7.1 rebounds in 35.0 minutes per game. She recorded 28 double-figure scoring efforts with eight 20-point games. During the Gulf Coast Showcase, she recorded 56 points and 28 rebounds in the three wins over Air Force, South Florida and No. 21 Baylor. During the finals against Baylor she recorded a then career-high 26 points and 13 rebounds and was subsequently named MVP of the Gulf Coast Showcase. On February 23, 2023, Kiser scored a career-high 34 points in a win against Rutgers. Following the season she was named to the All-Big Ten first team by the coaches.

On March 30, 2023, Kiser declared for the 2023 WNBA draft. She finished her career ninth all-time in games played at Michigan with 129 games.

== Professional career ==
On June 29, 2023, Kiser signed with A.O. Eleutheria Moschatou of the Greek Women's Basketball League. She was named the Hoops Agents Player of the Week for the week ending January 11, 2024, after she recorded a double-double of 19 points and 15 rebounds.

For the 2024–25 season, Kiser joined Alba Berlin Frauen of the 1. Damen-Basketball-Bundesliga. She returned to Alba Berlin for the 2025–26 season.

Kiser joined the Rockhampton Cyclones of the NBL1 North for the 2026 NBL1 season. She finished the regular season as the league's rebounds per game leader and earned NBL1 North All Star Five First Team honors.

== Career statistics ==
Legend
GP	Games played	GS	Games started	MPG	Minutes per game	RPG	Rebounds per game
APG	Assists per game	SPG	Steals per game	BPG	Blocks per game	PPG	Points per game
TO	Turnovers per game	FG%	Field-goal percentage	3P%	3-point field-goal percentage	FT%	Free-throw percentage
**Bold**	Career best	°	League leader

=== College ===
Year	Team	GP	GS	MPG	FG%	3P%	FT%	RPG	APG	SPG	BPG	TO	PPG
2018–19	Michigan	18	0	5.1	44.0	0.0	70.6	1.6	0.3	0.1	0.3	0.3	1.9
2019–20	Michigan	29	0	8.5	49.3	**36.4**	72.0	1.3	0.6	0.2	0.4	0.5	3.0
2020–21	Michigan	17	0	12.5	38.5	20.0	75.0	2.6	1.1	0.2	0.2	0.4	2.4
2021–22	Michigan	32	32	31.2	44.4	22.7	69.9	**8.1**	1.8	0.7	**0.9**	2.0	9.3
2022–23	Michigan	**33**	**33**	**35.0**	**54.6**	34.9	**78.6**	7.1	**2.9**	**1.2**	0.8	**2.5**	**15.9**
**Career**		129	65	21.0	49.4	28.7	74.9	4.7	1.5	0.6	0.6	1.3	7.6
Statistics retrieved from Sports-Reference.
