= Euroleague Women 2007–08 Regular Season Group A =

Standings and Results for Group A of the Regular Season phase of the 2007-08 Euroleague Women basketball tournament.

Main page: EuroLeague Women 2007-08

Key to colors
Top four places in each group, advance to Eighth-Final Play-Offs
Eliminated

== Standings ==
	Team	Pld	W	L	PF	PA	Diff
1.	(Russia) CSKA Moscow	10	10	0	891	630	+261
2.	(Turkey) Fenerbahçe	10	6	4	717	732	-15
3.	(Hungary) MKB Euroleasing Sopron	10	5	5	718	729	-11
4.	(France) ESB Lille Metropole	10	4	6	665	758	-93
5.	(Latvia) TTT Riga	10	3	7	629	698	-69
6.	(Italy) Phard Napoli	10	2	8	703	776	-73

== Fixtures and results ==
=== Game 1 ===
November 7, 2007

November 7
18:00

(Report)

Fenerbahçe (Turkey)	85–79 (OT)	(Italy) Phard Napoli
Scoring by quarter: 21-19, 10-17, 22-23, 18-11, 14-8

Istanbul

November 7
19:30

(Report)

CSKA Moscow (Russia)	82–56	(Latvia) TTT Riga
Scoring by quarter: 25-18, 23-8, 19-12, 15-18

Moscow

November 7
20:00

(Report)

ESB Lille (France)	87–67	(Hungary) MBK Sopron
Scoring by quarter: 31-14, 12-24, 29-14, 15-15

Villeneuve d'Ascq

=== Game 2 ===
November 13–15, 2007

November 13
19:00

(Report)

TTT Riga (Latvia)	83–65	(France) ESB Lille
Scoring by quarter: 14-16, 21-12, 26-16, 22-21

Riga

November 14
18:00

(Report)

MBK Sopron (Hungary)	89–79	(Turkey) Fenerbahçe
Scoring by quarter: 19-20, 26-14, 24-21, 20-24

Sopron

November 15
20:45

(Report)

Phard Napoli (Italy)	72–86	(Russia) CSKA Moscow
Scoring by quarter: 15-22, 19-15, 14-30, 24-19

Naples

=== Game 3 ===
November 21, 2007

November 21
18:00

(Report)

MBK Sopron (Hungary)	82–69	(Italy) Phard Napoli
Scoring by quarter: 19-24, 21-14, 17-21, 25-10

Sopron

November 21
19:30

(Report)

Fenerbahçe (Turkey)	71–69	(Latvia) TTT Riga
Scoring by quarter: 23-15, 20-17, 20-17, 8-20

Istanbul

November 21
20:00

(Report)

ESB Lille (France)	48–99	(Russia) CSKA Moscow
Scoring by quarter: 5-24, 12-21, 15-30, 16-24

Villeneuve d'Ascq

=== Game 4 ===
November 28–29, 2007

November 28
19:30

(Report)

CSKA Moscow (Russia)	109–69	(Turkey) Fenerbahçe
Scoring by quarter: 34-19, 29-13, 16-15, 30-22

Moscow

November 28
20:00

(Report)

TTT Riga (Latvia)	77–66	(Hungary) MBK Sopron
Scoring by quarter: 8-19, 27-10, 19-21, 23-16

Riga

November 29
20:45

(Report)

Phard Napoli (Italy)	80–73	(France) ESB Lille
Scoring by quarter: 20-21, 13-25, 18-10, 29-17

Naples

=== Game 5 ===
December 5, 2007

December 5
18:00

(Report)

MBK Sopron (Hungary)	75–80	(Russia) CSKA Moscow
Scoring by quarter: 20-17, 19-18, 20-31, 16-14

Sopron

December 5
20:15

(Report)

Fenerbahçe (Turkey)	75–61	(France) ESB Lille
Scoring by quarter: 18-15, 21-20, 23-14, 13-12

Istanbul

December 5
20:00

(Report)

TTT Riga (Latvia)	63–55	(Italy) Phard Napoli
Scoring by quarter: 14-13, 19-12, 17-9, 13-21

Riga

=== Game 6 ===
December 12–13, 2007

December 12
18:00

(Report)

MBK Sopron (Hungary)	65–61	(France) ESB Lille
Scoring by quarter: 21-20, 17-15, 12-17, 15-9

Sopron

December 12
19:30

(Report)

TTT Riga (Latvia)	56–87	(Russia) CSKA Moscow
Scoring by quarter: 14-20, 12-22, 15-22, 15-23

Riga

December 13
20:45

(Report)

Phard Napoli (Italy)	73–77	(Turkey) Fenerbahçe
Scoring by quarter: 22-21, 13-22, 18-19, 20-15

Naples

=== Game 7 ===
December 19, 2007

December 19
19:30

(Report)

CSKA Moscow (Russia)	89–67	(Italy) Phard Napoli
Scoring by quarter: 26-15, 21-15, 17-16, 25-21

Moscow

December 19
19:30

(Report)

Fenerbahçe (Turkey)	78–61	(Hungary) MBK Sopron
Scoring by quarter: 20-16, 16-14, 23-13, 19-18

Istanbul

December 19
20:00

(Report)

ESB Lille (France)	67–50	(Latvia) TTT Riga
Scoring by quarter: 20-9, 17-14, 11-17, 19-10

Villeneuve d'Ascq

=== Game 8 ===
January 9–10, 2008

January 9
19:30

(Report)

CSKA Moscow (Russia)	101–61	(France) ESB Lille
Scoring by quarter: 24-10, 20-24, 34-13, 23-14

Moscow

January 9
20:00

(Report)

TTT Riga (Latvia)	55–59	(Turkey) Fenerbahçe
Scoring by quarter: 12-8, 19-15, 11-18, 13-18

Riga

January 10
20:45

(Report)

Phard Napoli (Italy)	61–74	(Hungary) MBK Sopron
Scoring by quarter: 22-17, 11-26, 15-12, 13-19

Naples

=== Game 9 ===
January 16, 2008

January 16
18:00

(Report)

MBK Sopron (Hungary)	78–55	(Latvia) TTT Riga
Scoring by quarter: 22-22, 14-9, 23-12, 19-12

Sopron

January 16
19:30

(Report)

Fenerbahçe (Turkey)	65–76	(Russia) CSKA Moscow
Scoring by quarter: 20-22, 11-15, 18-20, 16-19

Istanbul

January 16
20:00

(Report)

ESB Lille (France)	82–79; OT (OT)	(Italy) Phard Napoli
Scoring by quarter: 16-23, 18-14, 18-19, 21-17, Overtime: 9-6

Villeneuve d'Ascq

=== Game 10 ===
January 22–23, 2008

January 22
19:30

(Report)

CSKA Moscow (Russia)	82–61	(Hungary) MBK Sopron
Scoring by quarter: 24-10, 20-16, 26-18, 12-17

Moscow

January 23
20:00

(Report)

ESB Lille (France)	60–59	(Turkey) Fenerbahçe
Scoring by quarter: 18-13, 9-15, 17-21, 16-10

Villeneuve d'Ascq

January 23
20:45

(Report)

Phard Napoli (Italy)	68–65	(Latvia) TTT Riga
Scoring by quarter: 10-13, 17-20, 26-13, 15-19

Naples
