= Kariata Diaby =

Ivorian basketball player (born 1995)

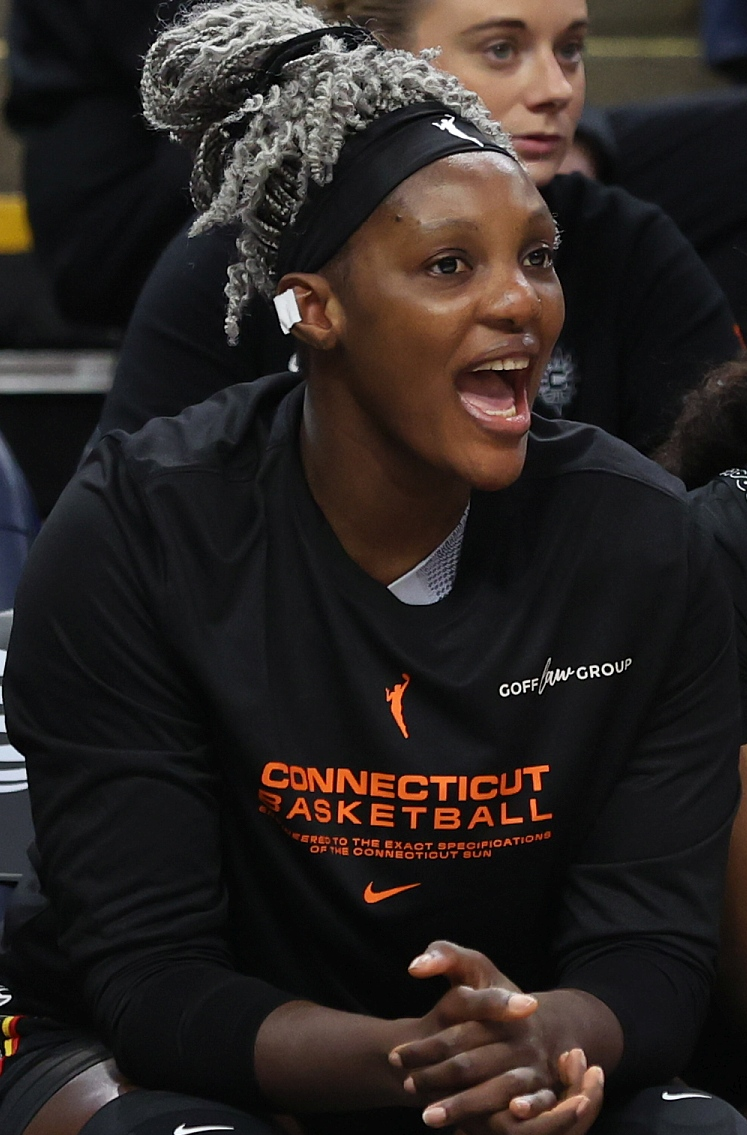
- Diaby with the Connecticut Sun in 2025

No. 23 – Tango Bourges Basket
- Position: Center
- League: La Boulangère Wonderligue

Personal information
- Born: 29 June 1995 (age 31) Daloa, Ivory Coast
- Listed height: 6 ft 4 in (1.93 m)

Career information
- Playing career: 2014–present

Career history
- 2014–2017: Voiron Basket
- 2017–2018: Charnay Basket Bourgogne Sud
- 2018–2019: Landerneau Bretagne Basket
- 2019–2024: ESB Villeneuve-d'Ascq
- 2024–present: Tango Bourges Basket
- 2025: Connecticut Sun
- Stats at Basketball Reference

Kariata Diaby (born 29 June 1995) is an Ivorian professional basketball player for Tango Bourges Basket of the La Boulangère Wonderligue. She also plays for the Ivory Coast women's national basketball team.

== Early life ==
Diaby was born on 29 June 1995 in Daloa, Ivory Coast. She grew up in Ivory Coast and played for the club ABC Fighters. She competed for the Ivory Coast women's national basketball team at the 2013 FIBA Africa Championship for Women. She also competed for the Ivory Coast national team at the 2017 Women's Afrobasket.

== Professional career ==
=== France ===
In 2014, at the age of 19, Diaby moved to France and joined the club Voiron Basket. She played for Voiron from 2014 to 2017, helping them achieve a promotion in 2016 while also competing for them at the Coupe de France Féminine. She then played for Charnay Basket Bourgogne Sud in the 2017–18 season, before signing with Landerneau Bretagne Basket in 2018.

After a season with Charnay, Diaby joined ESB Villeneuve-d'Ascq and played for them in the Ligue Féminine de Basketball (LFB) from 2020 to 2024. She averaged 11 points per game in the 2022–23 season and 11.2 points in the 2023–24 season, helping them win the LFB championship in the latter season. She moved to Tango Bourges Basket in 2024–25 and averaged 14.3 points, leading the team and being named the LFB regular season MVP.

=== WNBA ===
==== Connecticut Sun (2025) ====
On 13 February 2025, Diaby signed a training camp contract with the Connecticut Sun of the Women's National Basketball Association (WNBA). She made the opening day roster and, after her debut on 18 May, became the second Ivorian to play in the WNBA—following Christelle N'Garsanet. On 2 July, she was waived by the Sun.

== Career statistics ==
Legend
GP	Games played	GS	Games started	MPG	Minutes per game	RPG	Rebounds per game
APG	Assists per game	SPG	Steals per game	BPG	Blocks per game	PPG	Points per game
TO	Turnovers per game	FG%	Field-goal percentage	3P%	3-point field-goal percentage	FT%	Free-throw percentage
**Bold**	Career best	°	League leader

=== WNBA ===
Stats current as of game on June 29, 2025

WNBA regular season statistics
Year	Team	GP	GS	MPG	FG%	3P%	FT%	RPG	APG	SPG	BPG	TO	PPG
2025	Connecticut	13	0	7.9	.500	—	.786	1.0	0.4	0.5	0.1	0.9	1.9
**Career**	1 year, 1 team	13	0	7.9	.500	—	.786	1.0	0.4	0.5	0.1	0.9	1.9
