= Aminata Gueye =

French basketball player (born 2002)

- Gueye in 2026

No. 31 – Golden State Valkyries
- Position: Center
- League: WNBA

Personal information
- Born: 10 July 2002 (age 24)
- Listed height: 6 ft 3 in (1.91 m)

Career information
- Playing career: 2017–present

Career history
- 2017–2022: USO Mondeville
- 2022–2023: Toulouse Métropole Basket
- 2023–2025: ESB Villeneuve-d'Ascq
- 2025–2026: Casademont Zaragoza
- 2026–present: USK Praha
- 2026–present: Golden State Valkyries
Medals
Women's basketball
Representing France
FIBA World Cup
Silver medal – second place	2026 Germany

Aminata Gueye (born 10 July 2002) is a French professional basketball player for USK Praha of the Czech Women's Basketball League, as well as the Golden State Valkyries of the Women's National Basketball Association (WNBA), and a member of the France women's national basketball team.

== Playing career ==
Gueye began her career with USO Mondeville's youth academy in 2017. She made her Ligue Féminine de Basketball debut during the 2018–19 season. On 29 June 2022, she joined Toulouse Métropole Basket for the 2022–23 season.

She joined ESB Villeneuve-d'Ascq in 2023. During the 2024–25 EuroCup, she helped Villeneuve-d'Ascq win their second EuroCup in team history. During the round of 16 second leg against Movistar Estudiantes she recorded 18 points, 14 rebounds and three assists for a double-double. During the second leg of the quarterfinals against Beşiktaş she recorded 17 points, six rebounds and five steals. During the second leg of the semifinals against Sopron Basket she recorded 13 points and 12 rebounds.

She joined Casademont Zaragoza during the 2025–26 season. In her first year with the team she averaged 10.3 points and 6.2 rebounds in 18 minutes per game. Along with compatriot Carla Leite, she helped Zaragoza win the Supercopa de España de Baloncesto Femenino, finish the regular season in first place and advanced to the Liga Final. She also helped the team to a third place finish at the 2026 EuroLeague Women Final Six. On 28 May 2026, she left Zaragoza.

On 25 June 2026, she signed with USK Praha for the 2026–27 season.

On 20 September 2026, she signed a rest-of-season hardship contract with the Golden State Valkyries of the Women's National Basketball Association (WNBA).

== National team career ==
On 26 February 2026, she was selected to represent France at the 2026 FIBA Women's Basketball World Cup Qualifying Tournaments. She was the only French newcomer on the roster. During the tournament she averaged 6.4 points, 3.6 rebounds and 0.4 assists per game.

On 29 August 2026, she was selected to represent France at the 2026 FIBA Women's Basketball World Cup. She helped France advance to the 2026 FIBA Women's Basketball World Cup final for the first time in FIBA Women's Basketball World Cup history.

== Career statistics ==
=== WNBA ===
Legend
GP	Games played	GS	Games started	MPG	Minutes per game	RPG	Rebounds per game
APG	Assists per game	SPG	Steals per game	BPG	Blocks per game	PPG	Points per game
TO	Turnovers per game	FG%	Field-goal percentage	3P%	3-point field-goal percentage	FT%	Free-throw percentage
**Bold**	Career best	°	League leader

†	Denotes season(s) in which Gueye won a WNBA championship

==== Regular season ====
WNBA regular season statistics
Year	Team	GP	GS	MPG	FG%	3P%	FT%	RPG	APG	SPG	BPG	TO	PPG
2026^{†}	Golden State	1	0	4.0	.000	—	—	.0	.0	.0	.0	1.0	.0
**Career**	1 year, 1 team	1	0	4.0	.000	—	—	.0	.0	.0	.0	1.0	.0

==== Playoffs ====
WNBA regular season statistics
Year	Team	GP	GS	MPG	FG%	3P%	FT%	RPG	APG	SPG	BPG	TO	PPG
2026^{†}	Golden State	6	0	9.3	.318	.000	1.000	2.3	.7	.7	.3	1.5	3.2
**Career**	1 year, 1 team	6	0	9.3	.318	.000	1.000	2.3	.7	.7	.3	1.5	3.2
