= Nataša Dragojević =

- Dragojević in June 2025

Personal information
- Born: 8 December 1992 (age 33) Nikšić, Montenegro
- Position: Referee
- Officiating career: 2012–present

Nataša Dragojević (née Orbović, born 8 December 1992) is a Montenegrin basketball referee. She regularly officiates in Montenegro's top women's and men's divisions and at international level, officiates in EuroLeague Women and EuroCup Women. In 2025, she was selected as one of the 32 referees for the EuroBasket Women 2025.

== Career ==
Having developed within the Montenegrin refereeing system, Dragojević began officiating in 2012 and has worked in both the Montenegrin First Women's League and First Men's League. In 2019, she obtained her FIBA international license. In European club competitions, she is a regular referee in EuroLeague Women and EuroCup Women. In 2020, local media reported that she had become the first Montenegrin referee to officiate a EuroLeague Women game.

== EuroLeague Women and EuroCup Women ==
- EuroLeague Women: Regular appointments, including during the 2024–25 and 2025–26 seasons.
- EuroCup Women: Appearances in both the qualifying rounds and regular season, including the 2024–25 and 2025–26 seasons.
- SuperCup Women: 2026

== FIBA ==
Holding a FIBA license since 2019, Dragojević has been appointed to EuroBasket Women 2025 Qualifiers and youth competitions. In 2024, she officiated the final of the FIBA U20 Women's EuroBasket Division B, in Sofia. In 2025, she was selected for the FIBA Women's Under-19 World Cup.
