= Nikolina Knežević (basketball) =

Bosnian woman basketball player

BK Žabiny Brno
- Position: Point guard
- League: Czech Women's Basketball League

Personal information
- Born: 16 February 1995 (age 31) Sarajevo, Bosnia and Herzegovina
- Listed height: 177 cm (5 ft 10 in)

Career information
- WNBA draft: 2015: not drafted round, -
- Drafted by: -

Career history
- 2014: ŽKK Play off Sarajevo
- 2016-2020: ŽKK Budućnost Bemax
- 2021: BC Prometey
- 2022: İzmit Belediyespor
- 2022-present: BK Žabiny Brno

Nikolina Knežević, née Babić, (born 16 February 1995) is a 177 cm (5 ft 9 1/2 in) tall Bosnian basketball player, playing as point guard. She plays for BK Žabiny Brno. She is a member of the women's basketball team of Bosnia and Herzegovina.

== Career ==
She spent the first three years of her career in ŽKK Play Off from Sarajevo, and where she won her first professional title 2016. After that she continued her career abroad, playing first for Montenegrin first tier club ŽKK Budućnost Bemax, then, she moved to Ukraine where she played for BC Prometey, and then to the Turkish Women's Basketball Super League where she played for İzmit Belediyespor. Recently, she moved to the Czech Women's Basketball League, where she signed for BK Žabiny Brno, the club which holds record fourteen Czech championship titles.

== Honours ==
Nikolina won title with ŽKK Play Off sarajevo 2016..

== Personal life ==
Nikolina Babić recently married and took her husband's surname Knežević.
