= Matilde Villa =

Italian basketball player (born 2004)

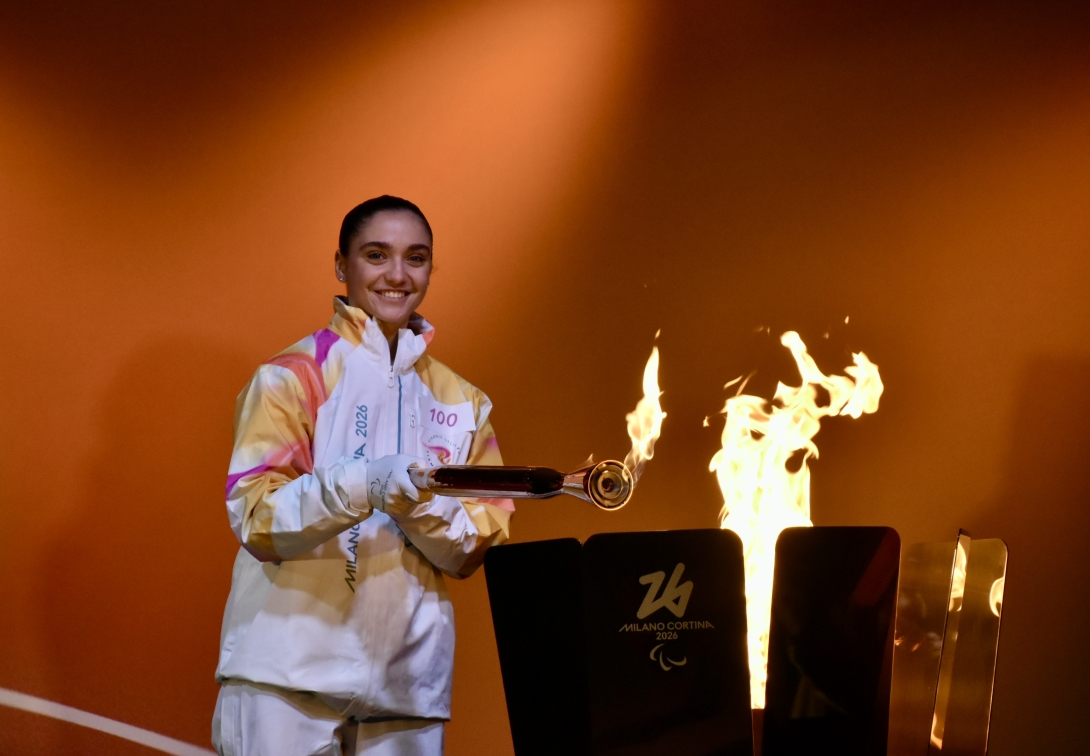
- Villa with the 2026 Winter Paralympics flame

No. 0 – Atlanta Dream
- Position: Shooting guard
- League: WNBA

Personal information
- Born: December 9, 2004 (age 21) Lissone, Carate Brianza, Lombardy, Italy
- Listed height: 5 ft 7 in (1.70 m)

Career information
- WNBA draft: 2024: 3rd round, 32nd overall pick
- Playing career: 2022–present

Career history
- 2022–present: Umana Reyer Venezia
- 2026-present: Atlanta Dream
- Stats at WNBA.com
- Stats at Basketball Reference
Medals
Women's basketball
Representing Italy
FIBA U20 Women's EuroBasket
Bronze medal – third place	2024 Lithuania	Team

Matilde Villa (born 9 December 2004) is an Italian basketball player for the Atlanta Dream of the Women's National Basketball Association (WNBA) and Umana Reyer Venezia of the Lega Basket Femminile. She was drafted by the Atlanta Dream of the Women's National Basketball Association (WNBA) with the 32nd pick in the 2024 WNBA draft.

== Professional career ==
At age 14, she debuted in Serie A1 with the Costa Masnaga sports club first team in the position of point guard. In 2020, she scored 36 points, 8 rebounds, and 4 assists in a match against Dinamo Sassari. Her Serie A record is 20 wins and 3 losses.

Villa has played for Umana Reyer Venezia in Venice, Italy since 2022. In the 2023–2024 season, she led the Italian Serie A with a per-game average of 10 points, 2.6 rebounds, and 3 assists. She had a 52% shot rate from two points, 36% from three, and 78% from the free throw line.

She was selected in the third round, 32nd overall, by the Atlanta Dream in the 2024 WNBA draft. She was the fourth Italian player to be selected in the WNBA, and joined fellow Italian Lorela Cubaj on the team. Villa remained overseas for the 2024 WNBA season.

=== Atlanta Dream (2026–present) ===
On September 15, 2026, Villa signed a developmental contract with the Atlanta Dream.

== International career ==
At the FIBA U20 Women's European Championship in 2023, Villa was named a stand-out player by FIBA. She accumulated an average of 18.9 points per game, 6.7 rebounds per game, 4.9 assists per game, and 2.6 steals per game.

== Personal life ==
Matilde was born in Lissone, Carate Brianza, Lombardy, Italy. Her older brother Edoardo and her twin sister Eleonora are both basketball players, with Eleonora currently playing in the NCAA with the Washington State Cougars. She and her sister Eleonora wanted to be professional dancers growing up, but were discouraged by her dance teacher and advised to change to basketball.
