= GiroLive Panthers Osnabrück =

German basketball team

- Nickname: Panthers
- Leagues: 1. Damen-Basketball-Bundesliga
- Arena: Schlosswallhalle
- Capacity: 1,400
- Location: Osnabrück, Germany
- Head coach: Aleksandar Cuic
- Website: girolive-panthers.de
Home	Away

GiroLive Panthers Osnabrück is a German women's professional basketball team based in Osnabrück. The team currently plays in the 1. Damen-Basketball-Bundesliga, the highest level of basketball in Germany.

== History ==
For the 2022-23 Basketball Bundesliga season, Osnabrück regained youth international Frieda Bühner, who returned to her home club after just four games for the University of Florida. Bühner had been considered one of the top talents of young Europeans. Further, the Panthers had signed Point guard Angela Rodriguez. Yet, Osnabrück had endured setbacks which resulted from the injury to young star and top performer Jenny Strozyk. Other main performers included Marie Reichert, Merrit Brennecke and Emma Eichmeyer.

== Notable players ==
Note: Flags indicate national team eligibility at FIBA-sanctioned events. Players may hold other non-FIBA nationalities not displayed.

Criteria

To appear in this section a player must have either:

- Set a club record or won an individual award while at the club
- Played at least one official international match for their national team at any time
- Played at least one official NBA match at any time.

- (Germany) Frieda Bühner
- (Germany) Marie Reichert
- (Mexico) Angela Rodriguez
- (Netherlands) Noortje Driessen
- (Slovakia) Stella Tarkovicova

== See also ==
- Giro-Live Ballers Osnabrück
