= Sparkle Taylor =

American basketball player (born 1995)

No. 12 – Free Agent
- Position: Guard
- League: WNBA

Personal information
- Born: July 28, 1995 (age 31) Flint, Michigan
- Listed height: 5 ft 10 in (1.78 m)

Career information
- High school: Northwestern High School (Flint, Michigan)
- College: UTEP (2013–2017)
- WNBA draft: 2017: undrafted
- Playing career: 2017–present

Career history
- 2017-2018: Forex Time Apollon Limassol
- 2020-2021: SPAR Gran Canaria
- 2022: Chicago Sky

Career highlights
- All-CUSA Second Team (2017); Conference USA Sixth Player of the Year (2016)
- Stats at Basketball Reference

Sparkle Taylor (born July 28, 1995) is an American professional basketball player who is a free agent in the Women's National Basketball Association (WNBA). She played college basketball at UTEP. Taylor went undrafted during the 2017 WNBA draft. She appeared in the league in 2022 with the Chicago Sky.

== College career ==
During Taylor's freshman season at UTEP, she was known as someone who wasn't afraid of contact and went to the free throw line often. She got to the line 77 times during that season. In her sophomore season, Taylor was inserted into the starting line up and was second on the team in scoring at 10.3 points. She was moved back to the bench during her junior season and averaged 9.8 points, but was award the C-USA Sixth Woman of the Year award in 2016. Her senior year, Taylor's offense exploded when she went over 18.4 points, 6.4 rebounds, and 1.7 assists. On a team full of freshman, Taylor was called upon to do a lot for the Miners. Taylor scored 34 point in back to back games against North Texas and Rice to become the first player in program history to score 30+ points in back-to-backs. She won the Player of the Week on February 20, 2017, for those efforts.

== College statistics ==
Year	Team	GP	Points	FG%	3P%	FT%	RPG	APG	SPG	BPG	PPG
2013–14	UTEP	35	191	.479	.600	.654	2.6	0.3	0.5	0.1	5.5
2014–15	UTEP	28	287	.436	.321	.684	4.4	0.6	0.6	0.4	10.3
2015–16	UTEP	31	304	.472	.200	.685	3.0	0.5	0.5	0.1	9.8
2016–17	UTEP	31	304	.468	.176	.781	6.4	1.7	1.3	0.2	18.4
Career		90	1162	.427	.341	.733	4.6	1.0	0.8	0.2	12.9

== Professional career ==
=== Overseas ===
Following her UTEP career, Taylor signed with Forex Time Apollon Limassol basketball club of Cyprus' Divions A league in 2017.

In the 2021–2022 season, Taylor played for Satu Mare in the Romania-Liga Nationala. In January 2022, Taylor was averaging 23.3 points, 7.7 rebounds, 2.6 assists, and 1.6 steals.

=== WNBA ===
==== Chicago Sky ====
Taylor signed a training camp contract with the Chicago Sky in 2021, but did not make the team and was waived from training camp on May 10, 2021.

Taylor returned the Sky's training camp in 2022 and was once again waived on May 4, 2022. Taylor was brought back right before the season opener on a Hardship Contract player due to Chicago's roster having multiple players missing. Taylor made her WNBA debut on May 6, 2022, against the Los Angeles Sparks. On May 13, 2022, Taylor was released from her hardship contract after appearing in 2 games with the Sky

== WNBA career statistics ==
Legend
GP	Games played	GS	Games started	MPG	Minutes per game	RPG	Rebounds per game
APG	Assists per game	SPG	Steals per game	BPG	Blocks per game	PPG	Points per game
TO	Turnovers per game	FG%	Field-goal percentage	3P%	3-point field-goal percentage	FT%	Free-throw percentage
**Bold**	Career best	°	League leader

=== Regular season ===
Year	Team	GP	GS	MPG	FG%	3P%	FT%	RPG	APG	SPG	BPG	TO	PPG
2022	Chicago	2	0	12.5	.833	.000	1.000	1.0	0.0	0.0	0.0	0.5	5.5
Career	1 year, 1 team	2	0	12.5	.833	.000	1.000	1.0	0.0	0.0	0.0	0.5	5.5
