= Alba Berlin Frauen =

Alba Berlin
- Leagues: 1. Damen-Basketball-Bundesliga
- Founded: 2016; 10 years ago
- Arena: Sömmering-Sporthalle
- Location: Berlin, Germany
- President: Marco Baldi
- Head coach: Cristo Cabrera
- Team captain: Lena Gohlisch
- Website: albaberlin.de
Home	Away	Third

Alba Berlin Frauen (in English: Alba Berlin Women) is a German women's basketball team located in Berlin. It is the women's section of Alba Berlin. The team plays in the DBBL, the "1. Deutsche Basketball Bundesliga" the country's first tier. The team entered the League in 2022 the first time and won the German Championship in 2024. In 2024/25 the team played in the Women's Eurocup for the first time.

Home games of the team are played in the Sömmering-Sporthalle in Berlin-Charlottenburg.

== Honours ==
Regionaliga

- Champions (1): 2017–18

2. DBBL

- Champions (1): 2021–22

1. DBBL

- Champions (1): 2023–24
- Cup (1) : 2025-26
