= ESB Villeneuve-d'Ascq =

French basketball club

Villeneuve-d'Ascq
- League: La Boulangère Wonderligue
- Founded: 1987
- Arena: Le Palacium (capacity: 2,174)
- Location: Villeneuve-d'Ascq, France
- Team colors: Red, White
- President: (France) Carmelo Scarna
- Head coach: (France) Maxime Bézin
- Championships: 2 EuroCup Women (2015, 2025)
- Website: https://esbva-lm.com/
Home	Away

ESB Villeneuve-d'Ascq is a French professional women's basketball club from Villeneuve-d'Ascq playing in the Ligue Féminine de Basketball since 2000.

== Honours ==
- Ligue Féminine
  - Winners (2): 2017, 2024
  - Runner-up (1): 2023
- French Cup
  - Runner-up (3): 2003, 2008, 2014
- EuroCup Women
  - Winners (2): 2015, 2025
- Euroleague Women
  - Runner-up (1): 2024

== Players ==
=== Current roster ===
Note: Flags indicate national team eligibility at FIBA-sanctioned events. Players may hold other non-FIBA nationalities not displayed.

Villeneuve d'Ascq roster
Players
Coaches

Pos.	No.	Nat.	Name	Ht.
PG	0	(France)	Leite, Carla	1.75 m (5 ft 9 in)	22 – 16 April 2004
SG	1	(Croatia)	Zellous, Shavonte	1.78 m (5 ft 10 in)	40 – 28 August 1986
F	2	(France)	Foppossi, Marie-Paule	1.84 m (6 ft 0 in)	28 – 28 January 1998
C	3	(United States)	Bone, Kelsey	1.93 m (6 ft 4 in)	33 – 31 December 1992
PG	4	(France)	Causeur, Clara	1.73 m (5 ft 8 in)	20 – 23 October 2005
PG	6	(France)	Hériaud, Caroline	1.65 m (5 ft 5 in)	29 – 22 December 1996
PF	7	(United States)	Peters, Haley	1.91 m (6 ft 3 in)	33 – 17 September 1992
C	8	(France)	Lutbert, Elodie	1.97 m (6 ft 6 in)	21 – 23 May 2005
PF	13	(France)	Hirsch, Maïa	1.93 m (6 ft 4 in)	22 – 13 November 2003
C	16	(France)	Ciak, Helena	1.98 m (6 ft 6 in)	36 – 15 December 1989
C	31	(France)	Gueye, Aminata	1.94 m (6 ft 4 in)	24 – 10 July 2002
SG	32	(Croatia)	Slonjšak, Iva	1.83 m (6 ft 0 in)	29 – 16 April 1997
SG	49	(Serbia)	Turčinović, Lidija	1.76 m (5 ft 9 in)	32 – 27 August 1994
PG	74	(France)	Eve Paget, Marie	1.71 m (5 ft 7 in)	31 – 28 November 1994

Head coach

- (France) Maxime Bezin

Assistant coach(es)

- (Portugal) Antonio De Barros
- (France) Hugo Rake
- (France) Antoine Jolly

Legend

- (C) Team captain
- Injured

- Roster
Updated: 11 December 2024

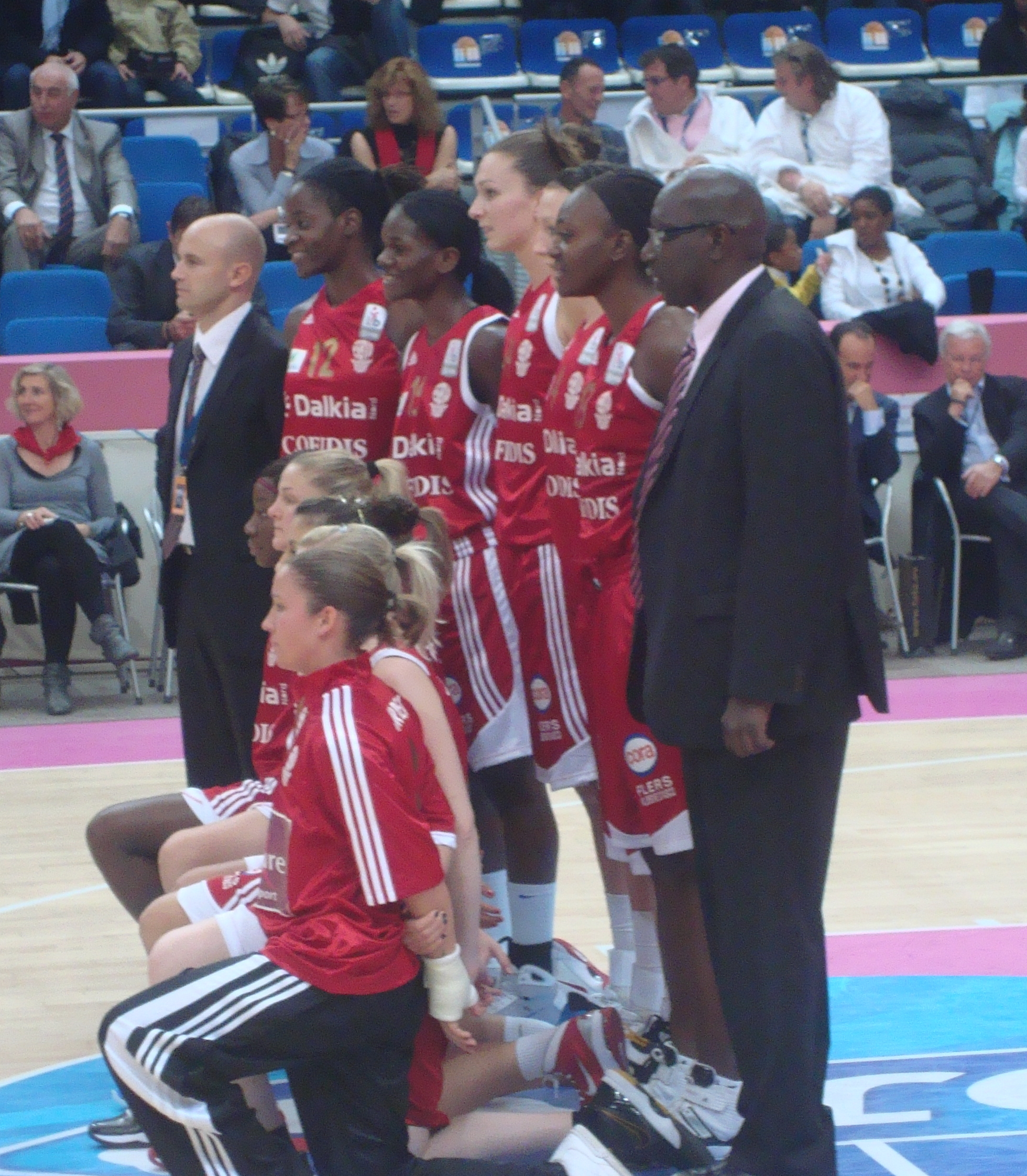
Team in 2010.

== Famous former players ==
- (France) Émilie Gomis
- (Croatia) Vedrana Grgin-Fonseca
- (France) Florence Lepron
- (France) Lætitia Kamba
- (United States) Megan Mahoney
- (Finland) Michaela Moua
- (Belgium) Emma Meesseman
