= 2026–27 Women's Basketball Super League =

Women's basketball league in Turkey

Women's Basketball Super League
- Season: 2026–27
- Dates: Regular season: October 2026 – February 2027; Play Offs: March – April 2027
- Games played: 132 (Regular season) (Play offs)
- Teams: 11

The 2026–27 Women's Basketball Super League is the 47th season of the top division women's basketball league in Turkey since its establishment in 1980. It started on 26 September 2026 with the first round of the regular season and will end in April 2027.

Fenerbahçe are the defending champions.

== Format ==
Each team plays each other twice. The top eight teams qualify for the play offs. The quarterfinals and semifinals are played as a best of three series while the final is played as a best of five series.

== Teams ==
Location of teams in 2026–27 Women's Basketball Super League

=== Promotion and relegation (pre-season) ===
| ▲ Promoted from TKBL | ▼ Relegated to TKBL |
|---|---|
| Samsun Basketbol (withdrew); Turgutlu Belediyespor; İstanbul Gençlik SK (replacement) | Kocaeli Women's Basketball |

=== Venues and locations ===
Location of teams in 2026–27 Women's Basketball Super League in Istanbul.
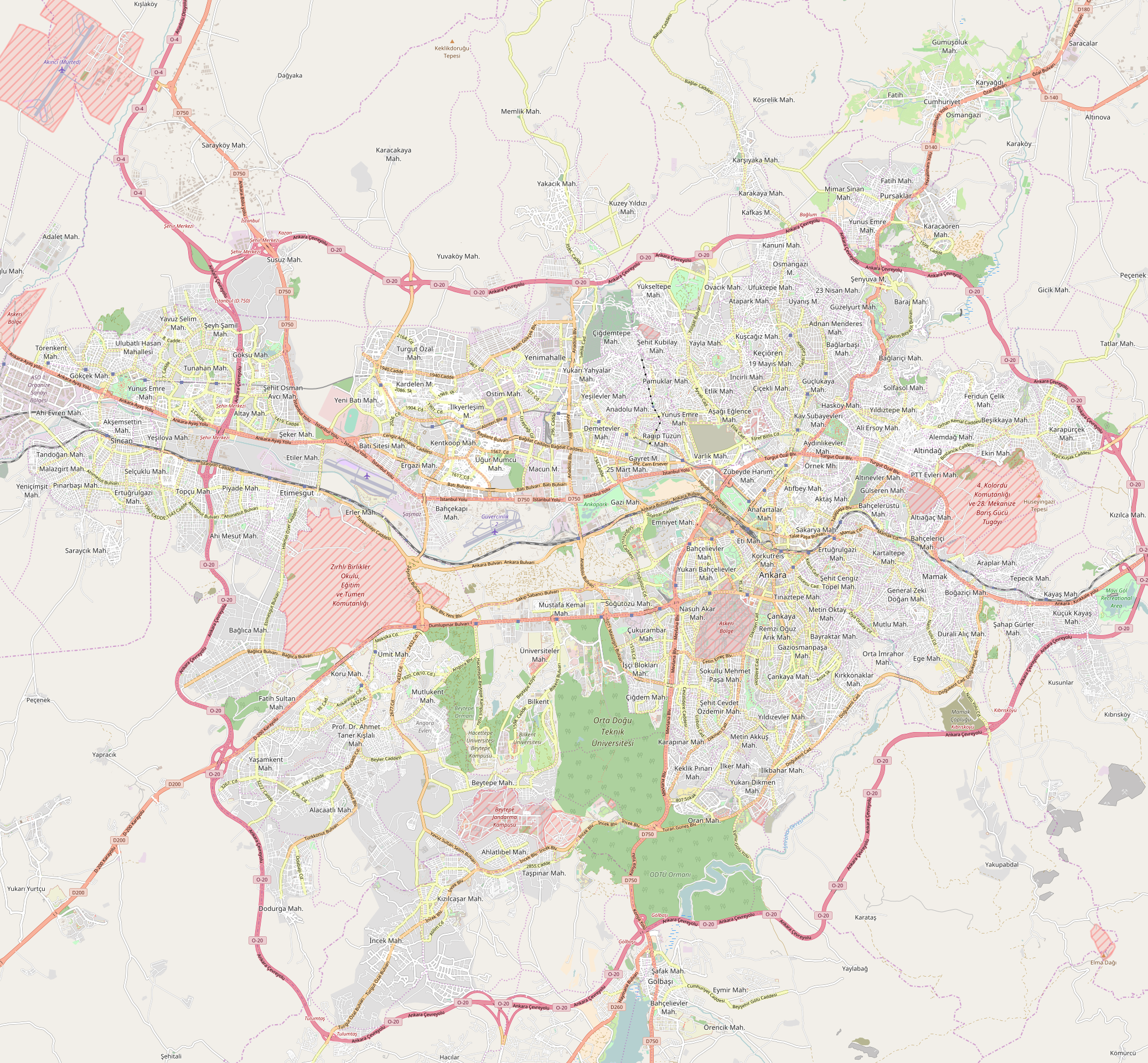
Location of teams in 2026–27 Women's Basketball Super League in Ankara.

| Teams | City | Arena | Head coach |
|---|---|---|---|
| Beşiktaş Boa | Istanbul | Akatlar Arena | (Turkey) Erman Okerman |
| Botaş | Ankara | Ankara Arena | (Turkey) Cemal İlker Gözeneli |
| Çimsa ÇBK Mersin | Mersin | Servet Tazegül Arena | (Turkey) Ceyhun Yıldızoğlu |
| Emlak Konut | Istanbul | Başakşehir Sports Complex | (Turkey) Murat Alkaş |
| Fenerbahçe Tarfin | Istanbul | Metro Enerji Sports Hall | (Turkey) Ahmet Çakı |
| Galatasaray Çağdaş Faktoring | Istanbul | Sinan Erdem Dome | (France) Frédéric Dusart |
| Melikgazi Basketbol | Kayseri | Kadir Has Spor Salonu | (Turkey) Emin Süel |
| İstanbul Gençlik SK | Istanbul | Ahmet Cömert Sport Hall | (Turkey) Alper Durur |
| Nesibe Aydın | Ankara | TOBB Sport Hall | (Turkey) Fırat Okul |
| Ormanspor | Ankara | M. Sait Zarifoğlu Sports Hall | (Turkey) Emre Özsarı |
| Turgutlu Belediyespor | Manisa | Yıldırım Beyazıt Sports Hall | (Turkey) İstemihan Örücü |

=== Managerial changes ===
| Team | Outgoing manager | Manner of departure | Date of vacancy | Position in table | Replaced with | Date of appointment |
|---|---|---|---|---|---|---|
| Nesibe Aydın | (Turkey) Erman Okerman | End of contract | 1 April 2026 | Pre-season | (Turkey) Fırat Okul | 13 May 2026 |
| Beşiktaş Boa | (Turkey) Ayhan Avcı | End of contract | 15 April 2026 | Pre-season | (Turkey) Erman Okerman | 16 May 2026 |
| Melikgazi Basketbol | (Turkey) Emre Özsarı | End of contract | 18 April 2026 | Pre-season | (Turkey) Emin Süel | 7 August 2026 |
| Ormanspor | (Turkey) Ahmet Furkan Sağlık | End of contract | 18 April 2026 | Pre-season | (Turkey) Emre Özsarı | 19 April 2026 |
| ~~Samsun Basketbol~~ | (Turkey) Murat Saat | End of contract | 1 May 2026 | Pre-season | (Turkey) Mehmet Özkan | 22 May 2026 |
| Galatasaray Çağdaş Faktoring | (Turkey) Fırat Okul | End of contract | 15 May 2026 | Pre-season | (France) Frédéric Dusart | 18 August 2026 |
| Fenerbahçe Tarfin | (Spain) Miguel Méndez | End of contract | 12 June 2026 | Pre-season | (Turkey) Ahmet Çakı | 9 September 2026 |
| Çimsa ÇBK Mersin | (Turkey) Ekrem Memnun | End of contract | 28 July 2026 | Pre-season | (Turkey) Ceyhun Yıldızoğlu | 8 August 2026 |

== League standings ==
| Pos | Team | Pld | W | L | PF | PA | PD | Pts | Qualification |
|---|---|---|---|---|---|---|---|---|---|
| 1 | Galatasaray Çağdaş Faktoring | 6 | 6 | 0 | 487 | 409 | +78 | 12 | Advance to playoffs |
| 2 | Botaş | 7 | 5 | 2 | 515 | 474 | +41 | 12 | Advance to playoffs |
| 3 | Nesibe Aydın | 7 | 5 | 2 | 526 | 511 | +15 | 12 | Advance to playoffs |
| 4 | Fenerbahçe Tarfin | 6 | 5 | 1 | 515 | 415 | +100 | 11 | Advance to playoffs |
| 5 | Beşiktaş Boa | 6 | 4 | 2 | 436 | 376 | +60 | 10 | Advance to playoffs |
| 6 | Çimsa ÇBK Mersin | 6 | 3 | 3 | 437 | 421 | +16 | 9 | Advance to playoffs |
| 7 | Ormanspor | 7 | 2 | 5 | 492 | 543 | −51 | 9 | Advance to playoffs |
| 8 | Melikgazi Basketbol | 7 | 2 | 5 | 448 | 499 | −51 | 9 | Advance to playoffs |
| 9 | Emlak Konut | 6 | 2 | 4 | 431 | 441 | −10 | 8 | |
| 10 | İstanbul Gençlik SK | 6 | 1 | 5 | 400 | 453 | −53 | 7 | |
| 11 | Turgutlu Belediyespor | 6 | 0 | 6 | 348 | 493 | −145 | 6 | Relegation to TKBL |

Updated to match(es) played on 7 November 2026. Source: KBSL
Rules for classification: 1) Points; 2) Points difference; 3) Points scored.

== Results ==
| Home \ Away | BES | BOT | MER | KON | FEN | GAL | IST | KAY | NES | ORM | TUR |
|---|---|---|---|---|---|---|---|---|---|---|---|
| Beşiktaş Boa | — | | | | 81–69 | | | 65–56 | | 80–49 | |
| Botaş | 70–66 | — | 83–74 | | 60–88 | | | | 77–79 | | |
| Çimsa ÇBK Mersin | | | — | | | | 73–56 | | 71–73 | 90–64 | |
| Emlak Konut | | 61–75 | 60–67 | — | | 67–73 | | | | | |
| Fenerbahçe Tarfin | | | | 87–78 | — | | | 99–70 | | | 84–57 |
| Galatasaray Çağdaş Faktoring | 83–61 | | 85–62 | | | — | | | 77–71 | | |
| İstanbul Gençlik SK | | | | 61–71 | | 83–84 | — | 58–75 | | | |
| Melikgazi Basketbol | | 61–70 | | | | 65–85 | | — | | | 64–58 |
| Nesibe Aydın | | | | | 69–88 | | 79–66 | | — | 72–67 | |
| Ormanspor | | | | 78–94 | | | 71–76 | 64–57 | | — | 99–74 |
| Turgutlu Belediyespor | 49–83 | 45–80 | | | | | | | 65–83 | | — |

Updated to match(es) played on 7 November 2026. Source: KBSL
Legend: Blue = home team win; Red = away team win.

== Play offs ==
Quarterfinals
1
8
4
5
2
7
3
6

Semifinals

Final

== Awards ==
All official awards of the 2026–27 Kadınlar Basketbol Süper Ligi.

=== MVP of the Round ===
| Round | Player | Team | EFF | Ref. |
|---|---|---|---|---|
| 1 | (United States) Rennia Davis | Beşiktaş | 30 | |
| 2 | (United States) Nia Clouden | Botaş | 32 | |
| 3 | (Poland) Stephanie Mavunga | Emlak Konut | 39 | |
| 4 | (United States) Chelsea Nelson | Nesibe Aydın | 26 | |
| 5 | (Nigeria) Pallas Kunaiyi-Akpannah | Emlak Konut | 29 | |
| 6 | (United States) Rennia Davis (x2) | Beşiktaş | 27 | |
| 7 | (United States) Beatrice Mompremier | Melikgazi Basketbol | 28 | |

=== Starting Five of the Round ===
| Round | PG | SG | SF | PF | C | Ref. |
|---|---|---|---|---|---|---|
| 1 | (Turkey) Olcay Çakır (Fenerbahçe) | (Turkey) Tuba Poyraz (Nesibe Aydın) | (United States) Jaime Nared (Botaş) | (United States) Rennia Davis (Beşiktaş) | (Serbia) Dragana Stanković (İstanbul Gençlik) | |
| 2 | (Turkey) Derin Erdoğan (Galatasaray) | (United States) Nia Clouden (Botaş) | (Ukraine) Alina Iagupova (ÇBK Mersin) | (Belgium) Emma Meesseman (Fenerbahçe) | (United States) Morgan Jones (Melikgazi Basketbol) | |
| 3 | (Turkey) Sevgi Uzun (Galatasaray) | (Belgium) Julie Allemand (Fenerbahçe) | (Turkey) Meltem Yıldızhan (Beşiktaş) | (United States) Raegan Beers (Nesibe Aydın) | (Poland) Stephanie Mavunga (Emlak Konut) | |
| 4 | (United States) Jaime Nared (Botaş) | (France) Carla Leite (ÇBK Mersin) | (United States) Jillian Alleyne (Beşiktaş) | (United States) Chelsea Nelson (Nesibe Aydın) | (Finland) Awak Kuier (Galatasaray) | |
| 5 | (Turkey) Derin Erdoğan (Galatasaray) | (Turkey) Olcay Çakır (Fenerbahçe) | (Nigeria) Pallas Kunaiyi-Akpannah (Emlak Konut) | (Nigeria) Evelyn Akhator (Botaş) | (United States) Kristine Anigwe (Ormanspor) | |
| 6 | (France) Carla Leite (ÇBK Mersin) | (Turkey) Sevgi Uzun (Galatasaray) | (Turkey) İdil Yeniçulha (Botaş) | (United States) Rennia Davis (Beşiktaş) | (United States) Raegan Beers (Nesibe Aydın) | |
| 7 | (France) Leïla Lacan (Fenerbahçe) | (United States) Jaelyn Brown (Melikgazi Basketbol) | (United States) Beatrice Mompremier (Melikgazi Basketbol) | (United States) Raegan Beers (Nesibe Aydın) | (Finland) Awak Kuier (Galatasaray) | |

=== Featured Player of the Round ===
| Round | Player | Team | EFF | Ref. |
|---|---|---|---|---|
| 1 | (Belgium) Emma Meesseman | Fenerbahçe | 23 | |
| 2 | (Cameroon) Jessica Thomas | ÇBK Mersin | 21 | |
| 3 | (Turkey) Tuba Poyraz | Nesibe Aydın | 16 | |
| 4 | (France) Marième Badiane | Beşiktaş | 17 | |
| 5 | (Hungary) Réka Lelik | Emlak Konut | 22 | |
| 6 | (Turkey) Tuba Poyraz (x2) | Nesibe Aydın | 23 | |
| 7 | (Turkey) Derin Erdoğan | Galatasaray | 19 | |
