= 1994–95 FIBA Women's European Champions Cup =

International basketball competition

The 1994–95 FIBA Women's European Champions Cup was the 37th and second-to-last edition of FIBA Europe's international competition for women's basketball national champion clubs. It ran from 7 September 1994 to 23 March 1995.

Defending champion SG Comense won its second title beating defending PB Godella in a rematch of the 1993 and 1994 finals. Comense was the fifth (and last to date) Italian team to win the competition after Geas Basket, Fiat Torino, AS Vicenza and Libertas Trogylos. CSKA Moscow and US Valenciennes Olympic also reached the Final Four, with the Russians ranking third.

== First qualifying round ==
Team #1	Agg.	Team #2	1st leg	2nd leg
Jedinstvo Tuzla (Bosnia and Herzegovina)	66–182	(Czech Republic) USK Prague	36–95	30–87
Bellinzona (Switzerland)	152–110	(Luxembourg) Etzella Ettelbruck	80–57	72–53
Powerbasket Wels (Austria)	106–150	(Belgium) Namur	52–70	54–80
Arvika (Sweden)	122–170	(Russia) CSKA Moscow	61–84	61–86
Keravnos Strovolos (Cyprus)	86–191	(Hungary) Ferencváros	44–106	42–85
Tikveš (North Macedonia)	138–140	(Romania) Arad	86–78	52–62
Tirana (Albania)	135–165	(Bulgaria) Levski Sofia	64–62	61–93

== Second qualifying round ==
Team #1	Agg.	Team #2	1st leg	2nd leg
USK Prague (Czech Republic)	129–108	(Slovenia) Ježica Ljubljana	87–54	42–54
Bellinzona (Switzerland)	124–169	(France) Valenciennes Olympic	61–72	63–97
Namur (Belgium)	116–144	(Greece) Sporting Athens	68–68	48–76
Ferencváros (Hungary)	134–112	(Croatia) Split	90–57	44–55
Arad (Romania)	141–149	(Slovakia) Ružomberok	79–53	62–93
Levski Sofia (Bulgaria)	137–180	(Turkey) Galatasaray	70–97	67–83
GTU Tbilisi (Georgia (country))	135–178	(Ukraine) Dynamo Kyiv	62–73	73–105

== Group stage ==
=== Group A ===
#	Team	Pld	W	L	PF	PA
1	(Russia) CSKA Moscow	10	8	2	806	720
2	(France) Valenciennes Olympic	10	7	3	685	676
3	(Spain) Godella	10	7	3	717	618
4	(Slovakia) Ružomberok	10	3	7	705	701
5	(Greece) Sporting Athens	10	3	7	689	723
6	(Hungary) Ferencváros	10	2	8	634	798

=== Group B ===
#	Team	Pld	W	L	PF	PA
1	(Italy) Comense	10	10	0	796	625
2	(Germany) Wuppertal	10	7	3	742	665
3	(Slovenia) Ježica Ljubljana	10	4	6	660	691
4	(Turkey) Galatasaray	10	4	6	679	747
5	(Ukraine) Dynamo Kyiv	10	3	7	611	640
6	(Czech Republic) USK Prague	10	2	8	630	750

== Quarter-finals ==
Team #1	Agg.	Team #2	1st	2nd	3rd
Galatasaray (Turkey)	1–2	(Russia) CSKA Moscow	90–83	55–94	59–75
Godella (Spain)	2–0	(Germany) Wuppertal	67–62	72–58	
Ružomberok (Slovakia)	0–2	(Italy) Comense	76–80	70–81	
Ježica Ljubljana (Slovenia)	0–2	(France) Valenciennes Olympic	73–77	63–82	

== Final four ==
- Cantù, Italy

Semi-finals
21 March
(Russia) CSKA Moscow	50
(Spain) Godella	71
21 March
(Italy) Comense	70
(France) Valenciennes	66

Final
23 March
(Spain) Godella	57
(Italy) Comense	64
Third place
23 March
(Russia) CSKA Moscow	82
(France) Valenciennes	64

== Individual statistics ==
=== Points ===
Rank	Name	Team	PPG
1.	(United States) Clarissa Davis	(Turkey) Galatasaray	30.5
2.	(United States) Virginia Toler	(Greece) Sporting Athens	24.8
3.	(Ukraine) Elena Marencikova	(Slovakia) Ružomberok	24.6
4.	(Russia) Elena Mozgovaya	(Slovakia) Ružomberok	21.2
5.	(Bosnia and Herzegovina) Razija Mujanović	(Italy) Comense	20.4

=== Rebounds ===
Rank	Name	Team	RPG
1.	(Russia) Elena Baranova	(Russia) CSKA Moscow	9.9
1.	(Lithuania) Jurgita Streimikyte	(France) Valenciennes Olympic	9.9
1.	(Russia) Natalia Zasulskaya	(Spain) Godella	9.9
4.	(United States) Pauline Parie	(Russia) CSKA Moscow	9.5
4.	(Poland) Malgorzata Dydek	(France) Valenciennes Olympic	9.5

=== Assists ===
Rank	Name	Team	RPG
1.	(United States) Teresa Weatherspoon	(Russia) CSKA Moscow	6.0
2.	(France) Audrey Sauret	(France) Valenciennes Olympic	4.1
3.	(United States) Virginia Toler	(Greece) Sporting Athens	3.8
4.	(Russia) Svetlana Antipova	(Russia) CSKA Moscow	3.5
5.	(Russia) Ludmila Konovalova	(Russia) CSKA Moscow	2.9
