= 1996–97 EuroLeague Women =

The 1997 Euroleague Women was the inaugural edition of the competition, a refoundation of the FIBA Women's European Champions Cup, FIBA Europe's premier competition for women's basketball clubs. Running from 2 October 1996 to 10 April 1997, the competition was turned from a European Cup for all national champion clubs to a 16-team semi-closed championship, with champions from lower-seeded national leagues playing instead the second tier Ronchetti Cup; in addition to thirteen national champions the French, German and Italian runners-up were also granted a spot. Other than suppressing the two qualifying rounds, the competition system was the same as that of the 1996 European Cup.

Bourges Basket defeated defending champion BTV Wuppertal to become the first French team to win the competition since the European Cup's foundation in 1959. The Final Four, which took place in Larissa, was contested by the same four teams as the previous edition's, with Ružomberok beating Pool Comense for the bronze.

== Preliminary round ==
=== Group A ===
#	Team	Pld	W	L	PF	PA
1	(Spain) Pool Getafe	14	13	1	1183	952
2	(France) Valenciennes Olympic	14	11	3	1108	992
3	(Slovakia) Ružomberok	14	11	3	1093	955
4	(Turkey) Galatasaray	14	7	7	945	963
5	(Hungary) Pécs	14	5	9	976	1076
6	(Germany) Wildcats Aschaffenburg	14	4	10	979	1017
7	(Italy) Ahena	14	3	11	885	1063
8	Croatia Zagreb	14	2	12	939	1090

=== Group B ===
#	Team	Pld	W	L	PF	PA
1	(France) Bourges	14	11	3	1035	855
2	(Czech Republic) Brno	14	10	4	1155	1119
3	(Italy) Pool Comense	14	10	4	1161	1069
4	(Germany) Wuppertal	14	9	5	1053	957
5	(Greece) Sporting Athens	14	7	7	1059	1010
6	(Slovenia) Ježica	14	3	11	919	1052
7	(Israel) Elitzur Ramla	14	3	11	963	1062
8	(Ukraine) Dynamo Kyiv	14	3	11	868	1059

== Quarter-finals ==
Team #1	Agg.	Team #2	1st	2nd	3rd
Pool Getafe (Spain)	0–2	(Germany) Wuppertal	78–89	66–89	
Valencienns Olympic (France)	1–2	(Italy) Pool Comense	82–74	55–108	68–81
Bourges (France)	2–0	(Turkey) Galatasaray	83–33	72–68	
Brno (Czech Republic)	0–2	(Slovakia) Ružomberok	59–87	57–63	

== Final four ==
- Larissa, Greece

Semi-finals
8 April
(Germany) Wuppertal	87
(Slovakia) Ružomberok	66
8 April
(Italy) Comense	58
(France) Bourges	68

Final
10 April
(Germany) Wuppertal	52
(France) Bourges	71
Third place
10 April
(Slovakia) Ružomberok	75
(Italy) Comense	58
