= 1. Damen-Basketball-Bundesliga =

Sports league

Frauen-Basketball-Bundesliga
- Founded: 1947; 79 years ago
- First season: 1947–48
- Country: Germany
- Confederation: FIBA Europe
- Number of teams: 14
- Level on pyramid: 1
- Domestic cup: German Women's Basketball Cup
- Current champions: Rutronik Stars Keltern (5. titles)
- Most championships: DJK Agon 08 Düsseldorf (12 titles)
- Website: toyota-dbbl.de/
- 2025–26 Damen-Basketball-Bundesliga

The Damen-Basketball-Bundesliga (DBBL) is the premier women's basketball championship in Germany. It was founded in 1947. DJK Agon 08 Düsseldorf and BTV 1846 Wuppertal are the most successful teams in the competition with twelve and eleven titles respectively, while TSV 1880 Wasserburg and Saarlouis Royals have dominated the competition in recent years. The leading teams from the DBBL enjoyed some success in FIBA Europe competitions in the 1980s and the 1990s, with Wuppertal winning the 1996 European Cup and Agon also reaching the competition's final in 1983 and 1986. The competition had been directly run by the German Basketball Federation (DBB) until 2001. On 21 June That year, the Damen-Basketball-Bundesligen GmbH was founded, an association which runs the first and second highest levels of women's club-level basketball in Germany.

== 2025–26 teams ==
- Rheinland Lions
- TK Hannover Luchse
- Eigner Angels Nördlingen
- Rutronik Stars Keltern
- Alba Berlin
- Inexio Royals Saarlouis
- GiroLive Panthers Osnabrück
- Herner TC
- Eisvögel USC Freiburg
- GISA LIONS MBC
- BC Pharmaserv Marburg

== List of champions ==
- 1947 TC Jahn 1883 Munich
- 1948 TC Jahn 1883 Munich
- 1949 TSC Spandau 1880
- 1950 TC Jahn 1883 Munich
- 1951 TC Jahn 1883 Munich
- 1952 Heidelberger TV 1846
- 1953 Neuköllner SF
- 1954 Heidelberger TV 1846
- 1955 Heidelberger TV 1846
- 1956 Heidelberger TV 1846
- 1957 Heidelberger TV 1846
- 1958 Heidelberger TV 1846
- 1959 Heidelberger TV 1846
- 1960 Heidelberger TV 1846
- 1961 TV Augsburg 1847
- 1962 TV Gross-Gerau
- 1963 Heidelberger TV 1846
- 1964 TV Augsburg 1847
- 1965 ATV 1877 Düsseldorf
- 1966 1. SC 05 Göttingen
- 1967 ATV 1877 Düsseldorf
- 1968 1. SC 05 Göttingen
- 1969 VfL Lichtenrade
- 1970 1. SC 05 Göttingen
- 1971 1. SC 05 Göttingen
- 1972 1. SC 05 Göttingen
- 1973 Heidelberger SC
- 1974 1. SC 05 Göttingen
- 1975 DJK Agon 08 Düsseldorf
- 1976 Düsseldorfer BG
- 1977 Düsseldorfer BG
- 1978 Bayer Leverkusen
- 1979 Bayer Leverkusen
- 1980 DJK Agon 08 Düsseldorf
- 1981 DJK Agon 08 Düsseldorf
- 1982 DJK Agon 08 Düsseldorf
- 1983 DJK Agon 08 Düsseldorf
- 1984 DJK Agon 08 Düsseldorf
- 1985 DJK Agon 08 Düsseldorf
- 1986 DJK Agon 08 Düsseldorf
- 1987 DJK Agon 08 Düsseldorf
- 1988 DJK Agon 08 Düsseldorf
- 1989 BTV 1846 Wuppertal
- 1990 DJK Agon 08 Düsseldorf
- 1991 DJK Agon 08 Düsseldorf
- 1992 Lotus Munich
- 1993 BTV 1846 Wuppertal
- 1994 BTV 1846 Wuppertal
- 1995 BTV 1846 Wuppertal
- 1996 BTV 1846 Wuppertal
- 1997 BTV 1846 Wuppertal
- 1998 BTV 1846 Wuppertal
- 1999 BTV 1846 Wuppertal
- 2000 BTV 1846 Wuppertal
- 2001 BTV 1846 Wuppertal
- 2002 BTV 1846 Wuppertal
- 2003 BC Marburg
- 2004 TSV 1880 Wasserburg
- 2005 TSV 1880 Wasserburg
- 2006 TSV 1880 Wasserburg
- 2007 TSV 1880 Wasserburg
- 2008 TSV 1880 Wasserburg
- 2009 Saarlouis Royals
- 2010 Saarlouis Royals
- 2011 TSV 1880 Wasserburg
- 2012 Wolfenbüttel Wildcats
- 2013 TSV 1880 Wasserburg
- 2014 TSV 1880 Wasserburg
- 2015 TSV 1880 Wasserburg
- 2016 TSV 1880 Wasserburg
- 2017 TSV 1880 Wasserburg
- 2018 Rutronik Stars Keltern
- 2019 Herner TC
- 2020 Canceled due to
  the COVID-19 pandemic in Germany
- 2021 Rutronik Stars Keltern
- 2022 Eisvögel USC Freiburg
- 2023 Rutronik Stars Keltern
- 2024 ALBA Berlin
- 2025 Rutronik Stars Keltern
