= BVA Cup =

Balkan Volleyball Association Cup

- Sport: Volleyball
- Founded: 2007; 19 years ago
- Administrator: Balkan Volleyball Association
- Country: Albania; Bosnia and Herzegovina; Bulgaria; Greece; Kosovo; Moldova; Montenegro; North Macedonia; Romania; Serbia; Turkey
- Continent: Europe
- Most recent champions: Men: (Turkey) İstanbul Gençlik SK (1st title); Women: (Greece) Olympiacos Piraeus (1st title)
- Most titles: Men: (Turkey) Fenerbahçe & (Turkey) İstanbul BBSK & (Turkey) Halkbank (2 titles each); Women: (Turkey) Beşiktaş (5 titles)
- Website: Balkan Volleyball

The BVA Cup (Balkan Volleyball Association Cup) is a volleyball competition contested by the respective national volleyball championship winning teams of nations in the Balkans. The tournament was founded in 2008 under the auspices of the Balkan Volleyball Association. The founders of the Balkan Volleyball Association are the volleyball federations of Albania, Bosnia and Herzegovina, Bulgaria, Greece, Kosovo, Moldova, Montenegro, North Macedonia, Romania, Serbia and Turkey. The winners of the BVA Cup get the right to play in the CEV Challenge Cup. The tournament is held in September and October.

== Winners (men) ==
Year	Winners	Runners-up	Third place
2008	(Turkey) İstanbul BBSK	(Greece) AOP Kifisias	(Romania) Știința Explorări
2009	(Turkey) Fenerbahçe	(Greece) Aris	(Serbia) Partizan
2010	(Serbia) Ribnica	(Romania) Știința Explorări	(Albania) Teuta Durrës
2011	(Romania) Universitatea Cluj	(Serbia) Ribnica	(North Macedonia) Shkëndija Tetovo
2012	(Turkey) İstanbul BBSK	(Serbia) Partizan	(Romania) Știința Explorări
2013	(Turkey) Fenerbahçe	(Albania) Studenti	(Serbia) Vojvodina
2014	(Turkey) Spor Toto	(Romania) Știința Explorări	(Greece) PAOK
2015	(Serbia) Spartak Ljig	(Romania) CSM București	(Turkey) Beşiktaş
2016	(Turkey) Galatasaray	(Serbia) Spartak Ljig	(Romania) CSM București
2017	(Turkey) İnegöl Belediye Spor	(Romania) CSM București	(Bosnia and Herzegovina) Radnik Bijeljina
2018	(Turkey) Ziraat Bankası	(Bulgaria) Hebar	(Romania) CSM București
2019	(Turkey) Tokat Belediye Plevnespor	(North Macedonia) Strumica	(Kosovo) Prishtina Volley
2020	(Turkey) Halkbank	(Kosovo) Luboteni Ferizaj	—N/a
2021	(Turkey) Halkbank	(Serbia) Radnički Kragujevac	(Greece) AOP Kifisias
2022	(Turkey) Cizre Belediyespor	(Moldova) DOR	(Kosovo) Peja
2023	(Serbia) Spartak Subotica	(Turkey) Bursa BBSK	(Greece) Pigasos Polichnis
2024	(Turkey) Arkas Spor	(Bulgaria) Beroe 2016	(Romania) Steaua Bucarești
2025	(Romania) Steaua București	(Turkey) Spor Toto	(Greece) OFI
2026	(Turkey) İstanbul Gençlik SK	(Greece) AO Kalamata 1980	(Bulgaria) Metalurg Pernik

=== By club ===
Club	Won	Runner-up	Years won	Years runner-up
(Turkey) İstanbul BBSK	2	0	2008, 2012	
(Turkey) Fenerbahçe	2	0	2009, 2013	
(Turkey) Halkbank	2	0	2020, 2021	
(Turkey) Spor Toto	1	1	2014	2025
(Serbia) Ribnica	1	1	2010	2011
(Serbia) Spartak Ljig	1	1	2015	2016
(Turkey) Galatasaray	1	0	2016	
(Turkey) İnegöl Belediye Spor	1	0	2017	
(Turkey) Ziraat Bankası	1	0	2018	
(Turkey) Tokat Belediye Plevnespor	1	0	2019	
(Turkey) Cizre Belediyespor	1	0	2022	
(Turkey) Arkas Spor	1	0	2024	
(Turkey) İstanbul Gençlik SK	1	0	2026	
(Romania) Universitatea Cluj	1	0	2011	
(Romania) Steaua București	1	0	2025	
(Serbia) Spartak Subotica	1	0	2023	
(Romania) Știința Explorări	0	2		2010, 2014
(Romania) CSM București	0	2		2015, 2017
(Turkey) Bursa BBSK	0	1		2023
(Serbia) Partizan	0	1		2012
(Serbia) Radnički Kragujevac	0	1		2021
(Greece) AOP Kifisias	0	1		2008
(Greece) Aris	0	1		2009
(Greece) AO Kalamata 1980	0	1		2026
(Bulgaria) Hebar	0	1		2018
(Bulgaria) Beroe 2016	0	1		2024
(Albania) Studenti	0	1		2013
(North Macedonia) Strumica	0	1		2019
(Kosovo) Luboteni Ferizaj	0	1		2020
(Moldova) DOR	0	1		2022
Total	19	19		

=== By country ===
Club / Nation	Won	Runner-up	Finals
Turkey	14	2	16
Serbia	3	4	7
Romania	2	4	6
Greece	0	3	3
Bulgaria	0	2	2
Albania	0	1	1
North Macedonia	0	1	1
Kosovo	0	1	1
Moldova	0	1	1
Total	19	19	38

== Winners (women) ==
Year	Winners	Runners-up	Third place
2008	(Turkey) Beşiktaş	(Serbia) Tent	(Bulgaria) Levski Sofia
2009	(Turkey) Beşiktaş	(Serbia) Zrenjanin	(Romania) CSU Medicina Tîrgu Mureş
2010	(Romania) VC Unic LPS Piatra Neamț	(Turkey) İlbank	(Serbia) Zrenjanin
2011	(Turkey) Nilüfer Belediyespor	(Romania) CSM Lugoj	(Serbia) Kolubara
2012	(Turkey) İlbank	(Romania) VC Unic LPS Piatra Neamț	—N/a
2013	(Turkey) Beşiktaş	(Romania) CSM Lugoj	(Serbia) Železničar Lajkovac
2014	(Turkey) Beşiktaş	(Romania) CSM Târgoviște	(Bulgaria) Maritza
2015	(Turkey) İdmanocağı SK	(Serbia) Železničar Lajkovac	(Romania) CSU Medicina Târgu Mureș (Bosnia and Herzegovina) Gacko
2016	(Turkey) Çanakkale Belediyespor	(Bulgaria) Kazanlak Volley	(Montenegro) Rudar Pljevlja
2017	(Serbia) Železničar Lajkovac	(Turkey) Çanakkale Belediyespor	(Romania) Dinamo București
2018	(Turkey) Beşiktaş	(Kosovo) KV Drita Gjilan	(Romania) CSM Lugoj
2019	(Turkey) Türk Hava Yolları	(Romania) Dinamo București	(Serbia) Železničar Lajkovac
2020	(Turkey) Türk Hava Yolları SK	(Serbia) Železničar Lajkovac	—N/a
2021	(Turkey) Aydın Büyükşehir Belediyespor	(Serbia) Jedinstvo Stara Pazova	(Romania) CSO Voluntari
2022	(Turkey) PTT Spor	(Romania) Dinamo București	(Serbia) Partizan
2023	(Turkey) Galatasaray	(Greece) AO Markopoulo	(Albania) Skënderbeu
2024	(Turkey) Galatasaray	(Greece) P.A.O.K. V.C.	(Bosnia and Herzegovina) ZOK Igman
2025	(Greece) AEK	(Montenegro) Herceg Novi	(Kosovo) KV Drita Gjilan
2026	(Greece) Olympiacos Piraeus	(Bulgaria) CSKA Sofia	(Kosovo) KV Drita Gjilan
