= 1995–96 FIBA Women's European Champions Cup =

International basketball competition

The 1995–96 FIBA Women's European Champions Cup was 38th and final edition of the competition, which was refounded the following year as Euroleague Women. It ran from 6 September 1995 to 21 March 1996.

BTV Wuppertal defeated defending champion SG Comense in the final to become the first (and only to date) German team to win the competition since its foundation in 1959. MBK Ružomberok and Bourges Basket also reached the Final Four, with the Slovaks winning the bronze.

== First qualifying round ==
Team #1	Agg.	Team #2	1st leg	2nd leg
Cenex (Bosnia and Herzegovina)	167–188	(Austria) Powerbasket Wels	78–84	89–104
Soubry Kortrijk (Belgium)	151–100	(Luxembourg) Etzella Ettelbruck	77–49	74–51
Tirana (Albania)	79–185	(Romania) Târgovişte	44–76	35–109
Bellinzona (Switzerland)	walkover	(Sweden) Nerike		
ŁKS Łódź (Poland)	150–154	(Israel) Elitzur Holon	79–76	71–78
Student Skopje (North Macedonia)	137–172	(Bulgaria) Montana	81–99	56–73

== Second qualifying round ==
Team #1	Agg.	Team #2	1st leg	2nd leg
Powerbasket Wels (Austria)	141–202	(Germany) Wuppertal	73–111	68–91
Soubry Kortrijk (Belgium)	153–166	(Turkey) Galatasaray	75–86	78–80
Târgovişte (Romania)	136–144	(Slovenia) Ježica Ljubljana	76–62	60–82
Nerike (Sweden)	116–163	(Slovakia) Ružomberok	55–69	61–94
Elitzur Holon (Israel)	147–139	(Hungary) Pécs	74–58	73–81
Montana (Bulgaria)	121–138	(Ukraine) Dynamo Kyiv	57–82	64–56
Becej (Federal Republic of Yugoslavia)	111–162	(Greece) Sporting Athens	58–75	53–87
Croatia Zagreb	117–113	(Czech Republic) USK Prague	70–56	47–57

== Group stage ==
=== Group A ===
#	Team	Pld	W	L	PF	PA
1	(Slovakia) Ružomberok	10	9	1	774	620
2	(Spain) Godella	10	6	4	709	646
3	(Ukraine) Dynamo Kyiv	10	6	4	644	620
4	(Turkey) Galatasaray	10	5	5	714	772
5	(Russia) CSKA Moscow	10	3	7	771	786
6	(Slovenia) Ježica Ljubljana	10	1	9	598	766

=== Group B ===
#	Team	Pld	W	L	PF	PA
1	(Italy) Comense	10	9	1	744	651
2	(Germany) Wuppertal	10	6	4	810	723
3	(France) Bourges	10	5	5	697	643
4	(Greece) Sporting Athens	10	5	5	738	718
5	Croatia Zagreb	10	4	6	687	737
6	(Israel) Elitzur Holon	10	1	9	629	883

== Quarter-finals ==
Team #1	Agg.	Team #2	1st	2nd	3rd
Sporting Athens (Greece)	1–2	(Slovakia) Ružomberok	72–66	62–64	54–69
Dynamo Kyiv (Ukraine)	0–2	(Germany) Wuppertal	62–75	58–80	
Galatasaray (Turkey)	0–2	(Italy) Comense	69–82	81–85	
Bourges (France)	2–0	(Spain) Godella	88–78	72–62	

== Final four ==
- Sofia, Bulgaria

Semi-finals
19 March
(Slovakia) Ružomberok	67
(Germany) Wuppertal	84
19 March
(Italy) Comense	62
(France) Bourges	54

Final
21 March
(Germany) Wuppertal	76
(Italy) Comense	62
Third place
21 March
(Slovakia) Ružomberok	65
(France) Bourges	59

=== Semifinals ===
19 March 1996
17:00 GTM+1

Report

Ružomberok (Slovakia)	67–84	(Germany) Wuppertal
Scoring by half: 34-40, 33-44
Pts: Godályová 20; Rebs: Kovacová 11; Asts: Mozgovaya, Bieliková 4		Pts: Brondello 31; Rebs: Kehrenberg 7 Asts: Kehrenberg, Timms 4

?,
Sofia
Attendance: 1,600

19 March 1996
19:00 GTM+1

Report

Comense (Italy)	62–54	(France) Bourges
Scoring by half: 26-21, 36-33
Pts: Gordon 20; Rebs: Mujanović 14; Asts: Pollini, Todeschini 2		Pts: Fijalkowski 12; Rebs: Kotočová 7 Asts: Kotočová, Souvré 2

?,
Sofia
Attendance: 2,000

=== Final ===
21 March 1996

Report

Wuppertal (Germany)	76–62	(Italy) Comense
Scoring by half: 34-33, 42-29
Pts: Brondello 27; Rebs: Kremer 9 Asts: Timms 8		Pts: Fullin, Gordon, Todeschini 12; Rebs: Mujanović 12; Asts: Pollini 3

?,
Sofia
Attendance: 2,500

== Individual statistics ==
=== Points ===
Rank	Name	Team	PPG
1.	(United States) Clarissa Davis	(Turkey) Galatasaray	25.9
2.	(United States) Cindy Brown	(Israel) Elitzur Holon	23.9
3.	(Russia) Elena Baranova	(Russia) CSKA Moscow	22.4
4.	(Australia) Sandra Brondello	(Germany) Wuppertal	21.8
5.	(United States) Virginia Toler	(Greece) Sporting Athens	20.8

=== Rebounds ===
Rank	Name	Team	PPG
1.	(United States) Venus Lacy	(Greece) Sporting Athens	12.7
2.	(Russia) Elena Baranova	(Russia) CSKA Moscow	12.1
3.	(United States) Cindy Brown	(Israel) Elitzur Holon	10.7
4.	(United States) Daedra Charles	(Turkey) Galatasaray	8.9
5.	(England) Andrea Congreaves	(Spain) Godella	8.8

=== Assists ===
Rank	Name	Team	PPG
1.	(Russia) Svetlana Antipova	(Russia) CSKA Moscow	6.6
2.	(United States) Virginia Toler	(Greece) Sporting Athens	5.7
3.	(Russia) Ludmila Konovalova	(Russia) CSKA Moscow	5.3
4.	(Australia) Michelle Timms	(Germany) Wuppertal	4.9
5.	(Slovakia) Iveta Bieliková	(Slovakia) Ružomberok	4.5
