= Galatasaray S.K. (women's basketball) =

Turkish basketball team

Galatasaray
- 2026–27 Galatasaray S.K. (women's basketball) season
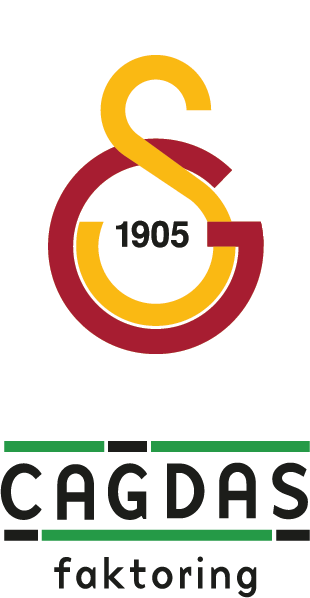
- Nickname: Sarayın Sultanları (Sultans of the Palace)
- Leagues: Turkish Super League; EuroLeague Women
- Founded: 1954; 72 years ago
- History: Galatasaray (1954–2010); Galatasaray Medical Park (2010–2012); Galatasaray (2012–2013); Galatasaray OdeaBank (2013–2015); Galatasaray (2015–2022); Galatasaray Çağdaş Faktoring (2022–present)
- Arena: Sinan Erdem Dome (capacity 16,000)
- Location: Istanbul, Turkey
- Team colors: Yellow and red
- Main sponsor: Çağdaş Faktoring
- President: Dursun Özbek
- Team manager: Melahat Aydın
- Head coach: Frédéric Dusart
- Team captain: Gökşen Fitik
- Championships: Turkish League (13); Turkish Cup (11); President Cup (8); Euroleague (1); FIBA Eurocup (2)
- Website: www.galatasaray.org
Home

Galatasaray Women's Basketball, also known as Galatasaray Çağdaş Faktoring for sponsorship reasons, is the professional women's basketball section of Galatasaray S.K., a major sports club in Istanbul, Turkey. Galatasaray women's basketball team play matches in Ahmet Cömert Sport Hall which has a seating capacity for 2,200 spectators.

The team recently won the 2013–14 EuroLeague Women and the Turkish Women's Basketball League title after beating Fenerbahçe Women's Basketball in the finals. Galatasaray is the second most successful Turkish club in European competitions, having won 3 major trophies (5 less than Fenerbahçe Women's Basketball), and they boast being the first Turkish club to have won the Euroleague competition for women.

Galatasaray women basketball squad in October 25, 2026 against Nesibe Aydın

== Previous names ==
Period	Previous names
1954–2010	Galatasaray
2010–2012	Galatasaray Medical Park
2012–2013	Galatasaray
2013–2015	Galatasaray Odeabank
2015–2022	Galatasaray
2022–present	Galatasaray Çağdaş Faktoring

== Home courts ==
#	Court	Capacity	Period
1	Abdi İpekçi Arena	12,270	2007
2	Ayhan Şahenk Arena	3,500	2008–2009
3	Abdi İpekçi Arena	12,270	2009–2017
4	Ahmet Cömert Sport Hall	3,500	2017–2021
5	Sinan Erdem Dome	16,000	2021
6	Şehit Mustafa Özel Spor Kompleksi	2,100	2021–2022
7	Başakşehir Spor Kompleksi	3,012	2022–2023
8	Ahmet Cömert Sport Hall	2,200	2023–2024
9	Sinan Erdem Dome	16,000	2024–present

== Players ==
=== Current squad ===
Galatasaray roster
Players
Coaches

Pos.	No.	Nat.	Name	Ht.	Wt.	Age
PF	1	(United States)	Howard, Natasha	1.88 m (6 ft 2 in)	78 kg (172 lb)	35 – 2 September 1991
SF	2	(Turkey)	Akalan, Feride	1.85 m (6 ft 1 in)		25 – 14 October 2001
SG	3	(United States) (Bosnia and Herzegovina)	Smalls, Kamiah (DC)	1.78 m (5 ft 10 in)		28 – 17 April 1998
PG	4	(France)	Fauthoux, Marine	1.76 m (5 ft 9 in)		25 – 23 January 2001
PG	5	(United States)	Miles, Olivia	1.78 m (5 ft 10 in)	76 kg (168 lb)	23 – 29 January 2003
PG	6	(Turkey)	Fitik, Gökşen (C)	1.75 m (5 ft 9 in)		25 – 11 August 2001
SF	7	(Turkey)	Sezgin, Aybüke	1.75 m (5 ft 9 in)		19 – 26 June 2007
SF	8	(Turkey)	Yılmaz, Sude	1.82 m (6 ft 0 in)		24 – 15 March 2002
SG	10	(Turkey)	Uzun, Sevgi	1.78 m (5 ft 10 in)	64 kg (141 lb)	28 – 25 November 1997
PG	11	(Turkey)	Erdoğan, Derin	1.68 m (5 ft 6 in)		24 – 28 June 2002
F	13	(France)	Salaün, Janelle	1.88 m (6 ft 2 in)		25 – 5 September 2001
F	14	(Hungary)	Juhász, Dorka	1.96 m (6 ft 5 in)	91 kg (201 lb)	26 – 18 December 1999
G	16	(Turkey)	Bay, Gamze			19 – 26 April 2007
F	17	(Turkey)	Bayram, Elif	1.87 m (6 ft 2 in)		25 – 18 September 2001
SF	18	(Turkey)	Düzcü, Yaren	1.80 m (5 ft 11 in)		19 – 4 March 2007
C	21	(Netherlands)	Hof, Emese	1.91 m (6 ft 3 in)		30 – 29 May 1996
PF	34	(Finland)	Kuier, Awak	1.95 m (6 ft 5 in)		25 – 19 August 2001
PG	54	(Turkey)	Durmuşoğlu, Edanur	1.60 m (5 ft 3 in)		19 – 14 March 2007
SG	77	(United Kingdom)	Winterburn, Holly	1.80 m (5 ft 11 in)		26 – 1 October 2000

Head coach

- (France) Frédéric Dusart

Assistant coach(es)

- (France) Frédéric Sénécaut
- (Turkey) Tuğçe Canbaz
- (Turkey) Batukaan Akkaya

Athletic trainer(s)

- (Turkey) Semih Eroğlu
- (Turkey) Serkan Bodur

Physiotherapist(s)

- (Turkey) Mümin Balcıoğulları
- (Turkey) Sıla Nur Bilgin

Team manager

- (Turkey) Elif Magul

Legend

- (C) Team captain
- (DC) Dual citizenship
- Injured

- Roster
Updated: 20 November 2026

Last updated: 20 November 2026.
Source: Turkish Basketball Federation, FIBA Basketball

=== Depth chart ===
Pos.	Starting 5	Bench 1	Bench 2	Bench 3	Inactive
C	Awak Kuier	Emese Hof
PF	Natasha Howard	Dorka Juhász	Elif Bayram
SF	Janelle Salaün	Feride Akalan	Sude Yılmaz	Yaren Düzcü	Aybüke Sezgin
SG	Sevgi Uzun	Holly Winterburn	Kamiah Smalls		Gamze Bay
PG	Marine Fauthoux	Gökşen Fitik	Derin Erdoğan	Edanur Durmuşoğlu	Olivia Miles

(colours: Turkish or homegrown players; foreign players)

== Honours ==
=== International competitions ===
Galatasaray S.K.
Medal record

Women's basketball

Representing Galatasaray

EuroLeague Women
Bronze medal – third place	FIBA Euroleague Women	1998–99
Gold medal – first place	FIBA Euroleague Women	2013–14
Silver medal – second place	FIBA Euroleague Women	2025–26

FIBA EuroCup
Bronze medal – third place	FIBA Eurocup Women	2007–08
Gold medal – first place	FIBA Eurocup Women	2008–09
Gold medal – first place	FIBA Eurocup Women	2017–18
Bronze medal – third place	FIBA Eurocup Women	2021–22
Silver medal – second place	FIBA Eurocup Women	2022–23

FIBA Europe SuperCup Women
Silver medal – second place	FIBA Europe SuperCup Women	2009
Silver medal – second place	FIBA Europe SuperCup Women	2018

Turkish Women's Basketball League
Gold medal – first place	TBB League	1987–88
Gold medal – first place	TBB League	1989–90
Gold medal – first place	TBB League	1990–91
Gold medal – first place	TBB League	1991–92
Gold medal – first place	TBB League	1992–93
Gold medal – first place	TBB League	1993–94
Gold medal – first place	TBB League	1994–95
Gold medal – first place	TBB League	1995–96
Gold medal – first place	TBB League	1996–97
Gold medal – first place	TBB League	1997–98
Gold medal – first place	TBB League	1999–00
Gold medal – first place	TBB 2nd League	2005–06
Silver medal – second place	TBB League	2007–08
Silver medal – second place	TBB League	2009–10
Silver medal – second place	TBB League	2010–11
Silver medal – second place	TBB League	2011–12
Silver medal – second place	TBB League	2012–13
Gold medal – first place	TBB League	2013–14
Gold medal – first place	TBB League	2014–15
Silver medal – second place	TBB League	2020–21
Silver medal – second place	TBB League	2025–26

Turkish Women's Basketball Cup
Gold medal – first place	Turkish Cup	1992–93
Gold medal – first place	Turkish Cup	1993–94
Gold medal – first place	Turkish Cup	1994–95
Gold medal – first place	Turkish Cup	1995–96
Gold medal – first place	Turkish Cup	1996–97
Gold medal – first place	Turkish Cup	1997–98
Silver medal – second place	Turkish Cup	1998–99
Silver medal – second place	Turkish Cup	1999–00
Silver medal – second place	Turkish Cup	2000–01
Silver medal – second place	Turkish Cup	2008–09
Gold medal – first place	Turkish Cup	2009–10
Gold medal – first place	Turkish Cup	2010–11
Gold medal – first place	Turkish Cup	2011–12
Gold medal – first place	Turkish Cup	2012–13
Gold medal – first place	Turkish Cup	2013–14
Silver medal – second place	Turkish Cup	2015–16
Silver medal – second place	Turkish Cup	2025–26

- EuroLeague Women / FIBA Women's European Champions Cup
  - Winners (1): 2013–14
  - Runners-up (1): 2025–26
  - Third (1): 1998–99
  - Quarter-finals (9): 1994–95, 1995–96, 1996–97, 2000–01, 2011–12, 2012–13, 2014–15, 2015–16, 2020–21
- FIBA EuroCup
  - Winners (2): 2008–09, 2017–18
  - Runners-up (1): 2022–23
  - Third (2): 2007–08, 2021–22
  - Fourth (1): 2016–17
- European Super Cup
  - Runners-up (2): 2009, 2018
- Triple Crown (1) : 2013–14

=== Domestic competitions ===
- Turkish Basketball Super League
  - Winners (13): 1987–88, 1989–90, 1990–91, 1991–92, 1992–93, 1993–94, 1994–95, 1995–96, 1996–97, 1997–1998, 1999–2000, 2013–14, 2014–15
  - Runners-up (6): 2007–08, 2009–10, 2010–11, 2012–13, 2020–21, 2025–26
- Turkish Women's Basketball League
  - Winners (1): 2005–06
- Turkish Cup
  - Winners (11): 1992–93, 1993–94, 1994–95, 1995–96, 1996–97, 1997–98, 2009–10, 2010–11, 2011–12, 2012–13, 2013-14
  - Runners-up (6): 1998–99, 1999–2000, 2000–01, 2008–09, 2015–16, 2025–26
- Turkish Presidential Cup
  - Winners (8): 1993, 1994, 1995, 1996, 1997, 1998, 2008, 2011
  - Runners-up (5): 2010, 2012, 2013, 2014, 2015

== Season by season ==
Season	Division	Pos.	Pos.	Turkish Cup	Presidential Cup	European competitions	
1987–88	KBSL	1st	—				
1988–89	KBSL	2nd	—				
1989–90	KBSL	1st	—				
1990–91	KBSL	1st	—				
1991–92	KBSL	1st	—			1 EuroLeague Women	PR
1992–93	KBSL	1st	—	Champion	Champion	1 EuroLeague Women	PR
1993–94	KBSL		Champion	Champion	Champion	1 EuroLeague Women	PR
1994–95	KBSL		Champion	Champion	Champion	1 EuroLeague Women	QF
1995–96	KBSL		Champion	Champion	Champion	1 EuroLeague Women	QF
1996–97	KBSL		Champion	Champion	Champion	1 EuroLeague Women	QF
1997–98	KBSL		Champion	Champion	Champion	1 EuroLeague Women	RS
1998–99	KBSL		Runners-up			1 EuroLeague Women	4F
1999–00	KBSL		Champion				
2000–01	KBSL		Semifinalist			1 EuroLeague Women	QF
2001–02	KBSL						
2002–03	KBSL						
2003–04	KBSL						
2004–05	KBSL						
2005–06	TKBL		Champion				
2006–07	KBSL		Semifinalist				
2007–08	KBSL		Runners-up			2 EuroCup Women	SF
2008–09	KBSL	4th	Semifinalist			2 EuroCup Women	C
2009–10	KBSL	3rd	Runners-up			1 EuroLeague Women	8F
2010–11	KBSL	1st	Runners-up	Champions		1 EuroLeague Women	8F
2011–12	KBSL	2nd	Runners-up	Champions		1 EuroLeague Women	8F
2012–13	KBSL	2nd	Runners-up	Champions		1 EuroLeague Women	8F
2013–14	KBSL	1st	Champion	Champions	Runners-up	1 EuroLeague Women	C
2014–15	KBSL	1st	Champion			1 EuroLeague Women	QF
2015–16	KBSL	5th	Quarterfinalist	Runners-up		1 EuroLeague Women	QF
2016–17	KBSL	3rd	Semifinalist			2 EuroCup Women	SF
2017–18	KBSL	8th	Quarterfinalist			2 EuroCup Women	C
2018–19	KBSL	6th	Semifinalist	Quarterfinalist	—	2 EuroCup Women	R8
2019–20	KBSL	CX	Cancelled	Quarterfinalist		2 EuroCup Women	CX
2020–21	KBSL	2nd	Runners-up			1 EuroLeague Women	QF
2021–22	KBSL	5th	Quarterfinalist	Quarterfinalist		1 EuroLeague Women; 2 EuroCup Women	RS; SF
2022–23	KBSL	3rd	Semifinalist	Cancelled		2 EuroCup Women	RU
2023–24	KBSL	5th	Semifinalist	Quarterfinalist	—	2 EuroCup Women	QF
2024–25	KBSL	3rd	Semifinalist	Quarterfinalist	—	2 EuroCup Women	R16
2025–26	KBSL	2nd	Runners-up	Runners-up	—	1 EuroLeague Women	RU
2026–27	KBSL					1 EuroLeague Women	

== Technical staff ==
As of 16 October 2026

Staff member	Position
Işıl Alben	General Coordinator
Melahat Aydın	Administrative Manager
Elif Magul	Team Manager
Frédéric Dusart	Head Coach
Frédéric Sénécaut	Assistant Coach
Tuğçe Canbaz	Assistant Coach
Batukaan Akkaya	Assistant Coach
Semih Eroğlu	Conditioner
Serkan Bodur	Conditioner
Tolgahan Korkmaz	Doctor
Mümin Balcıoğulları	Physiotherapist
Sıla Nur Bilgin	Physiotherapist
İbrahim Kalkan	Media and Communications Officer
Zerrin Hatacıkoğlu	Masseuse
Osman Aşbay	Masseur
Alaaddin Akkoyun	Equipment Manager
Özcan Kör	Operation

== Team captains ==
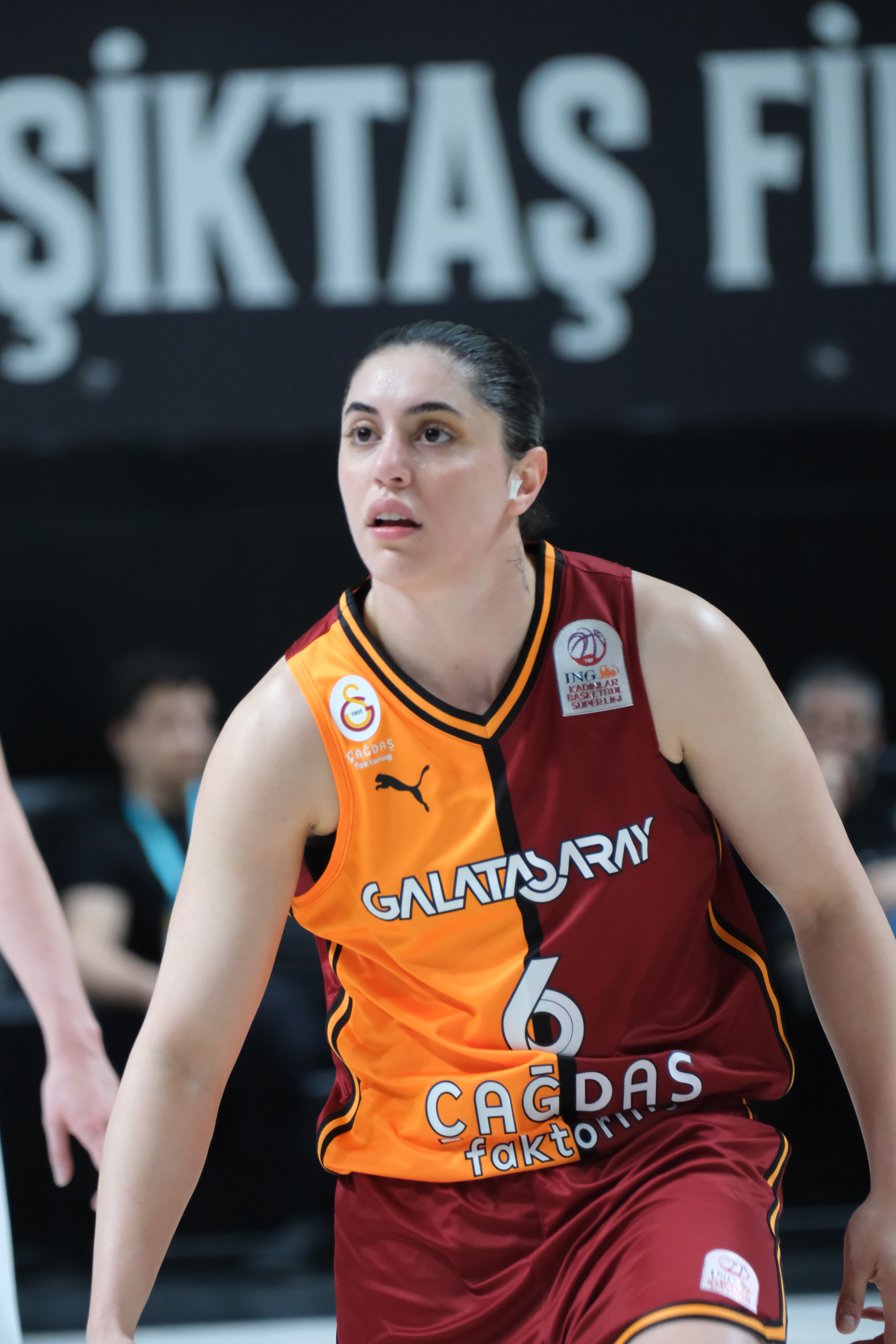
Gökşen Fitik, team captain from 2026 to present

Dates	Name
2008–2010	(Turkey) Yasemin Horasan
2010–2014	(Turkey) Işıl Alben
2014–2015	(Turkey) Nevriye Yılmaz
2015–2020	(Turkey) Işıl Alben
2020–2021	(Turkey) Cansu Köksal
2021–2022	(Turkey) Pelin Bilgiç
2022–2023	(Turkey) Işıl Alben
2023–2024	(Turkey) Meltem Yıldızhan
2024–2026	(Turkey) Ayşe Cora
2026–	(Turkey) Gökşen Fitik

== Head coaches ==
Frédéric Dusart

Dates	Name
1994–1996	(Turkey) Zafer Kalaycıoğlu
1996–2002	(Turkey) Ekrem Memnun
2005–2007	(Turkey) Ayhan Avcı
2007–2009	(Turkey) Cem Akdağ
2009	(Turkey) Hakan Acer
2009	(Turkey) Okan Çevik
2009–2010	(Turkey) Zafer Kalaycıoğlu
2010–2012	(Turkey) Ceyhun Yıldızoğlu
2012–2016	(Turkey) Ekrem Memnun
2016–2018	(Serbia) Marina Maljkovic
2018–2022	(Turkey) Efe Güven
2022–2023	(Turkey) Alper Durur
2023–2024	(Serbia) Miloš Pađen
2024	(Turkey) Tolga Esenci
2024–2025	(Turkey) Ekrem Memnun
2025–2026	(Turkey) Hasan Fırat Okul
2026–	(France) Frédéric Dusart

== See also ==
- See also Galatasaray S.K. (men's basketball)
- See also Galatasaray S.K. (wheelchair basketball)
