= 1998–99 EuroLeague Women =

The 1998–99 Euroleague Women was the third edition of the Euroleague era of FIBA's premier international competition for European women's basketball clubs. It ran between 23 September 1998 and 8 April 1999.

MBK Ruzomberok won its first title beating former champion Pool Comense in the final, becoming the first (and only to date) Slovak team to win the competition. Galatasaray and BTV Wuppertal also reached the Final Four, which took place in Brno, while defending champion CJM Bourges was knocked out by Ruzomberok in the quarterfinals.

== Group stage ==
=== Group A ===
#	Team	Pld	W	L	PF	PA
1	(Slovakia) Ruzomberok	14	10	4	1104	928
2	(Germany) Wuppertal	14	10	4	1063	985
3	(Federal Republic of Yugoslavia) Hemofarm	14	10	4	1078	980
4	(Italy) Pool Comense	14	9	5	1066	966
5	(France) Valenciennes	14	8	6	1048	1020
6	(Hungary) Pécs	14	5	9	1004	1000
7	(Greece) Panathinaikos	14	4	10	96	1131
8	(Israel) Elitzur Ramla	14	0	14	873	1188

=== Group B ===
#	Team	Pld	W	L	PF	PA
1	(Czech Republic) Brno	14	12	2	1043	798
2	(Turkey) Galatasaray	14	11	3	928	873
3	(Russia) Dynamo Moscow	14	11	3	1084	945
4	(France) Bourges	14	8	6	913	814
5	(Italy) Schio	14	5	9	898	932
6	(Slovenia) Ježica	14	4	10	884	1040
7	(Poland) Lotos Gdynia	14	3	11	850	1003
8	(Germany) Wildcats	14	2	12	911	1106

== Quarter-finals ==
Team #1	Agg.	Team #2	1st	2nd	3rd
Ruzomberok (Slovakia)	2–1	(France) Bourges	44–65	51–42	65–58
Wuppertal (Germany)	2–1	(Russia) Dynamo Moscow	73–80	73–63	67–58
Brno (Czech Republic)	0–2	(Italy) Pool Comense	52–74	65–70	
Galatasaray (Turkey)	2–1	(Federal Republic of Yugoslavia) Hemofarm	76–61	78–85	73–68

== Final four ==
- Brno, Czech Republic

Semi-finals
6 April
(Slovakia) Ruzomberok	54
(Turkey) Galatasaray	47
6 April
(Germany) Wuppertal	53
(Italy) Pool Comense	70

Final
8 April
(Slovakia) Ruzomberok	63
(Italy) Pool Comense	48
Third place
8 April
(Turkey) Galatasaray	62
(Germany) Wuppertal	53

== Individual statistics ==
=== Points ===
Rank	Name	Team	PPG
1.	(Australia) Sandra Brondello	(Germany) Wuppertal	19.5
2.	(Greece) Eleni Trialoni	(Greece) Panathinaikos	19.4
3.	(United States) Andrea Stinson	(Turkey) Galatasaray	18.7
3.	(France) Isabelle Fijalkowski	(Italy) Pool Comense	18.7
5.	(Israel) Victoria Savin	(Israel) Elitzur Ramla	18.4

=== Rebounds ===
Rank	Name	Team	PPG
1.	(Germany) Marlies Askamp	(Germany) Wuppertal	12.3
2.	(Czech Republic) Kamila Vodicková	(Czech Republic) Brno	11.3
3.	(Poland) Malgorzata Dydek	(Poland) Lotos Gdynia	9.5
3.	(Germany) Olga Pfeifer	(Germany) Wildcats	9.4
5.	(Moldova) Natalia Svisceva	(Slovakia) Ruzomberok	8.6

=== Assists ===
Rank	Name	Team	PPG
1.	(Spain) Ana Belén Álvaro	(France) Valenciennes	4.8
2.	(Belarus) Elena Ksendzhik	(Russia) Dynamo Moscow	4.1
3.	(France) Yannick Souvré	(France) Bourges	3.5
4.	(Canada) Shawna Molcak	(Germany) Wildcats	2.9
4.	(Slovakia) Iveta Bieliková	(Slovakia) Ruzomberok	2.9
