= Keltern =

German municipality

- Municipality
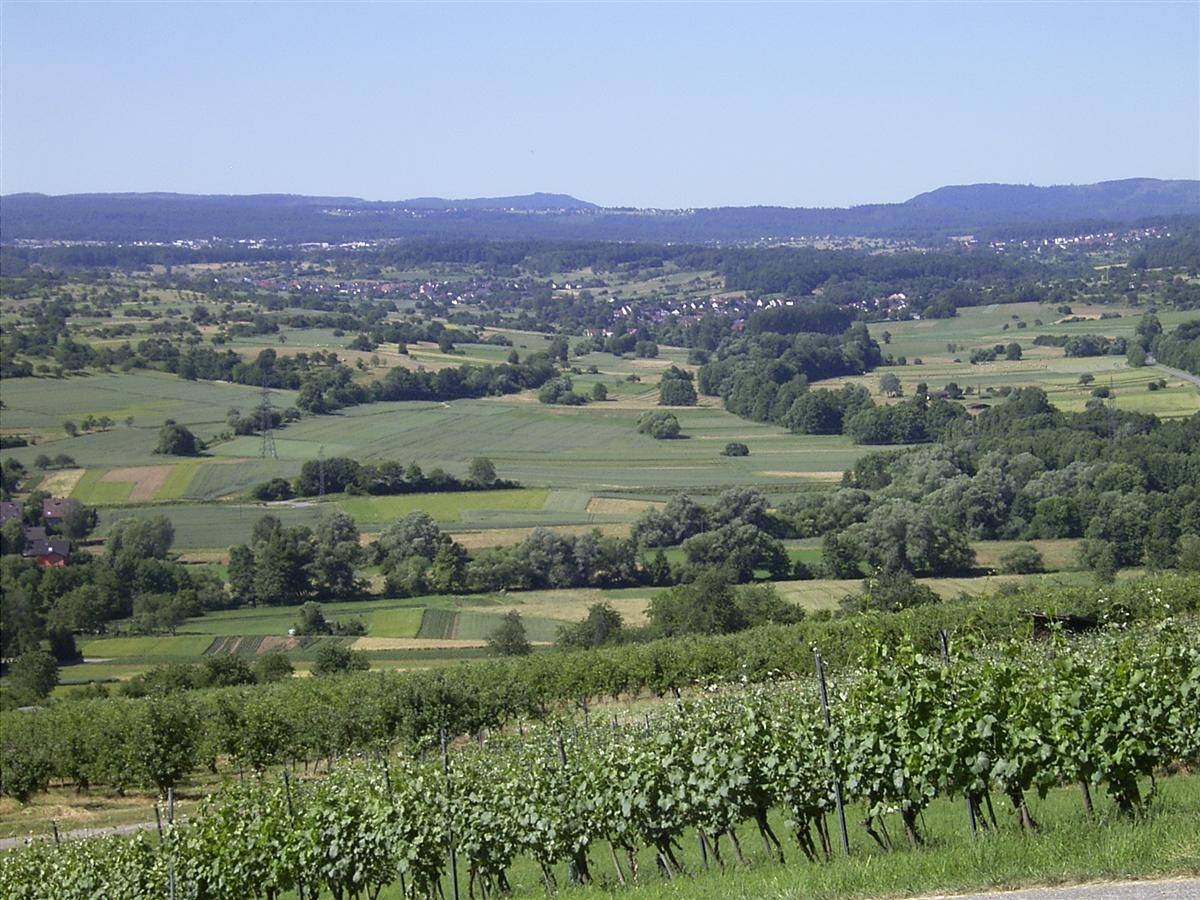
- Countryside of Keltern

- Coat of arms

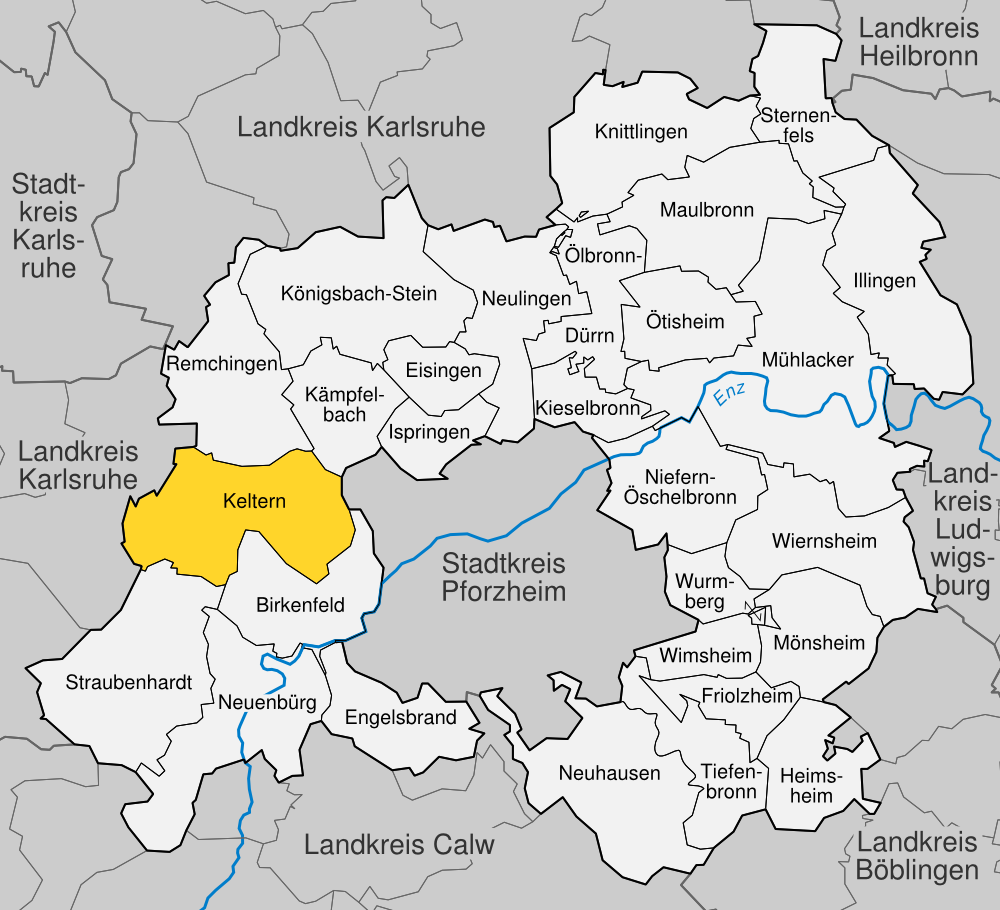
- Location of Keltern within Enzkreis district
- Interactive map of Keltern
- Location within Germany Location within Baden-Württemberg
- Coordinates: 48°54′3″N 8°34′33″E
- Country: Germany
- State: Baden-Württemberg
- Admin. region: Karlsruhe
- District: Enzkreis

Government
  - Mayor (2021–29): Steffen Bochinger

Area
  - Total: 29.82 km^{2} (11.51 sq mi)
- Elevation: 195 m (640 ft)

Population (2025-12-31)
  - Total: 8,687
  - Density: 291.3/km^{2} (754.5/sq mi)
- Time zone: UTC+01:00 (CET)
  - Summer (DST): UTC+02:00 (CEST)
- Postal codes: 75210
- Dialling codes: 07236 07082
- Vehicle registration: PF
- Website: www.keltern.de

Keltern (German pronunciation: [ˈkɛltɐn]) is a municipality in the district of Enz in Baden-Württemberg in Germany.

== History ==
The oldest documentary records for the constituent towns of Keltern are from 827 or 830 for Dietenhausen, 919 for Ellmendingen, sometime in the 11th century for Dietlingen, 1219 for Weiler, and around 1300 for Niebelsbach.

The towns of Dietenhausen, Dietlingen, Ellmendingen, and Weiler were for most of their history part of Baden. They were assigned to Pforzheim's jurisdiction in 1803 when the state became the Grand Duchy of Baden. When the districts were shuffled in 1809, the four towns were assigned to the second Pforzheim Oberamt, and again remained under Pforzheim when the district was recreated as Landkreis Pforzheim on 25 June 1938. Niebelsbach was ceded on 17 October 1806 to the Kingdom of Württemberg, under whom it was assigned to Oberamt Neuenbürg until 1 October 1938, when it was reassigned to Calw. Dietenhausen was incorporated into Ellemendingen on 1 July 1971.

On 30 March 1972, all five townships were joined to form the municipality of Keltern, which was assigned to the Enz district on 1 January 1973.

In 1989, 22 hectares (54 acres) of the Ellmendinger Roggenschleh were designated a Federally-protected nature reserve.

== Geography ==
The municipality (Gemeinde) of Keltern covers an area of 29.83 square kilometers (11.52 mi^{2}) in the Enz district, within the state of Baden-Württemberg and Federal Republic of Germany. It is located where the Black Forest transitions into the Kraichgau to its north; most of the municipality lies in the Pfinzhügelland, whose muschelkalk forms the latter's southern hills, while the buntsandstein under Weiler, towards the west of the municipality, forms the northern edge of the Black Forest. Keltern's primary watercourse is the Pfinz river, whose eastern tributaries flow in a rift parallel to the Upper Rhine Plain. The lowest elevation in the municipality, 172 meters (564 ft) normalnull (NN), is along the Pfinz at the border with Remchingen while the highest elevation, 353 meters (1,158 ft) NN, is found in the east.

== Demographics ==
Population development:

Year	Inhabitants
1990	8,130
2001	8,969
2011	9,086
2021	9,032

== Coat of arms ==
Keltern's coat of arms was approved by the Federal Ministry of the Interior on 11 July 1973 and generally recalls the viticulture practiced in the municipal area since the 15th century. It is divided into three portions by a black Göpel cut that makes up the roof of its lowermost image, a wine press rendered in black and gold. The left section is silver and contains a cluster of blue grapes and the right section is blue and contains a white goblet. The wine press represents those of Dietlingen and Ellmendingen.

== Sports ==
Keltern's Speiterlinghalle is home to the Rutronik Stars Keltern, 2018 and 2021 champion of the 1. Damen-Basketball-Bundesliga.
