= Ferencvárosi TC (disambiguation) =

Ferencvárosi TC is a men's football club in Ferencváros, Hungary.

Ferencvárosi TC may also refer to:

- Ferencvárosi TC (sports club), a sport society
- Ferencvárosi TC (women's football), women's football club
- Ferencvárosi TC (men's handball), men's handball club
- Ferencvárosi TC (women's handball), women's handball club
- Ferencvárosi TC (ice hockey), ice hockey club
- Ferencvárosi TC (men's water polo), men's water polo club
- Ferencvárosi TC (women's water polo), women's water polo club
- Ferencvárosi TC (women's basketball)
