= German Basketball Federation =

Organized basketball governing body in Germany

- Sport: Basketball
- Jurisdiction: Germany
- Abbreviation: DBB
- Founded: 1 October 1949; 76 years ago
- Affiliation: FIBA
- Regional affiliation: FIBA Europe
- Headquarters: Hagen
- President: Ingo Weiss

Official website
- www.basketball-bund.de
- (Germany)

The German Basketball Federation (German: Deutscher Basketball Bund, abbreviated as DBB) is the governing body for basketball in Germany. It is headquartered in Hagen, Germany.

== Competitions ==
The DBB also organizes several competitions:

- Men's competitions:
  - Basketball Bundesliga
  - ProA
  - ProB
  - BBL-Pokal
  - BBL Champions Cup (inactive)
- Men's Under-18 competitions:
  - DBB Albert Schweitzer Tournament
- Women's competitions:
  - Damen-Basketball-Bundesliga
  - Deutscher Pokalsieger
  - German Supercup

== History ==
The predecessor of the German Basketball Federation, called the "Society for the Promotion of Basketball", was founded in 1947. The German Basketball Federation itself was then founded on 1 October 1949, in Düsseldorf, Germany. Siegfried Reiner was the German Basketball Federation's first chairman.

== Presidents ==
President / 1st Chairman	Tenure
Siegfried Reiner	1949–1953
Gerhard Nacke-Erich	1953–1964
Hans-Joachim Höfig	1964–1973
Anton Kartak	1973–1984
Manfred Ströher	1984–1994
Roland Geggus	1994–2006
Ingo Weiss	2006–present

== Broadcasting rights ==
The German Basketball Federation games will stream on Bleacher Report Live in the United States.

== See also ==
- Germany men's national basketball team
- Germany men's national under-20 basketball team
- Germany men's national under-19 basketball team
- Germany men's national under-17 basketball team
- Germany men's national 3x3 team
- Germany women's national basketball team
- Germany women's national under-20 basketball team
- Germany women's national under-19 basketball team
- Germany women's national under-17 basketball team
- Germany women's national 3x3 team
