= German Women's Basketball Cup =

Annual basketball competition between clubs in Germany

- Sport: Basketball
- Founded: 1973
- Country: Germany
- Continent: (European Union) Europe
- Most recent champions: Alba Berlin (1st title)
- Related competitions: Damen-Basketball-Bundesliga; German Supercup
- Website: dbbl.de

The German Women's Basketball Cup (German: Deutscher Pokalsieger) is an annual basketball competition between clubs in Germany. It is Germany's first-tier cup competition and TSV 1880 Wasserburg is its current champion.

== Title holders ==
- 1972–73 SC Göttingen 05
- 1973–74 TV Grafenberg
- 1974–75 USC München
- 1975–76 Tus 04 Leverkusen
- 1976–77 Tus 04 Leverkusen
- 1977–78 Düsseldorfer BG
- 1978–79 Tus 04 Leverkusen
- 1979–80 DJK Agon 08 Düsseldorf
- 1980–81 DJK Agon 08 Düsseldorf
- 1981–82 SG BC USC München
- 1982–83 DJK Agon 08 Düsseldorf
- 1983–84 DJK Agon 08 Düsseldorf
- 1984–85 DJK Agon 08 Düsseldorf
- 1985–86 DJK Agon 08 Düsseldorf
- 1986–87 SG BC USC München
- 1987–88 DJK Agon 08 Düsseldorf
- 1988–89 BTV 1846 Wuppertal
- 1989–90 SG BC USC München
- 1990–91 SG BC USC München
- 1991–92 BTV 1846 Wuppertal
- 1992–93 BTV 1846 Wuppertal
- 1993–94 BTV 1846 Wuppertal
- 1994–95 BTV 1846 Wuppertal
- 1995–96 BTV 1846 Wuppertal
- 1996–97 BTV 1846 Wuppertal
- 1997–98 BTV 1846 Wuppertal
- 1998–99 BTV 1846 Wuppertal
- 1999–00 BTV 1846 Wuppertal
- 2000–01 BTV Gold-Zack Wuppertal
- 2001–02 BTV Gold-Zack Wuppertal
- 2002–03 BC uniVersa Marburg
- 2003–04 BG Dorsten
- 2004–05 TSV 1880 Wasserburg
- 2005–06 TSV 1880 Wasserburg
- 2006–07 TSV 1880 Wasserburg
- 2007–08 TV Saarlouis Royals
- 2008–09 TV Saarlouis Royals
- 2009–10 TV Saarlouis Royals
- 2010–11 TSV 1880 Wasserburg
- 2011–12 evo New Baskets Oberhausen
- 2012–13 Eisvögel USC Freiburg
- 2013–14 TSV 1880 Wasserburg
- 2014–15 TSV 1880 Wasserburg
- 2015–16 TSV 1880 Wasserburg
- 2016–17 TSV 1880 Wasserburg
- 2017–18 TSV 1880 Wasserburg
- 2018-19 Herner TC
- 2019-20 Rutronik Stars Keltern
- 2020-21 Rutronik Stars Keltern
- 2021-22 Herner TC
- 2022-23 TK Hannover Luchse
- 2023-24 TK Hannover Luchse
- 2024-25 Saarlouis Royals
- 2025-26 Alba Berlin

== See also ==
- German Basketball Federation
- Damen-Basketball-Bundesliga
