= Turgutlu Belediyespor =

Turkish women's basketball team

- Leagues: Turkish Super League
- Founded: 1988; 38 years ago
- Arena: Yıldırım Beyazıt Sports Hall
- Capacity: 2,500
- Location: Turgutlu, Manisa, Turkey
- Team colors: Red-Black
- President: Hüseyin Maliz
- Head coach: İstemihan Örücü
Home	Away

Turgutlu Belediyesi Spor Kulübü, commonly known as Turgutlu Belediyespor, is a Turkish professional women's basketball club based in Turgutlu, Turkey.

== History ==
In the 2024–25 season, the team reached the play-off finals of the Turkish Women's Basketball League, losing 3–2 to Çanakkale Belediyespor in a best-of-five series. In the following season, they finished in second place in the league with a record of 23 wins and 5 losses on point differential. They again reached the play-off finals, where they defeated Kırklareli Fen Bilimleri 3–2 to earn promotion to the Turkish Women's Basketball Super League.

Ahead of the 2026–27 season, the club reached a one-year deal with an option for a second year with İstemihan Örücü, who had served as the team's head coach for the previous four seasons and led the team to promotion to the Super League.

== Current roster ==
Turgutlu Belediyespor roster
Players
Coaches

Pos.	No.	Nat.	Name	Ht.	Age
C	0	(United States)	Bone, Kelsey	1.93 m (6 ft 4 in)	34 – 31 December 1991
SF	1	(Turkey)	Yıldız, Ferda	1.83 m (6 ft 0 in)	33 – 26 July 1993
PG	2	(United States)	Fair, Dyaisha	1.65 m (5 ft 5 in)	25 – 7 August 2001
F	3	(United States)	Cowling, Mikayla	1.88 m (6 ft 2 in)	30 – 4 September 1996
PG	5	(Turkey)	Zeybek, Senay	1.72 m (5 ft 8 in)	25 – 6 April 2001
PG	6	(Turkey)	Pala, Yaren		19 – 1 January 2007
F	8	(Turkey)	Kara, Tuana		20 – 24 July 2006
PF	10	(Turkey)	Yalçınkaya, Melike	1.86 m (6 ft 1 in)	33 – 1 September 1993
PF	11	(Turkey)	Temiz, Selin		19 – 8 January 2007
C	12	(Turkey)	Öztosun, Hatice		27 – 19 April 1999
G/F	23	(Turkey)	Dabakoğlu, Nihan	1.75 m (5 ft 9 in)	28 – 5 March 1998
SG	24	(Turkey)	Arğun, Nebahat		18 – 5 July 2008
PG	27	(Turkey)	Tongar, Dilara	1.69 m (5 ft 7 in)	35 – 22 February 1991
G/F	30	(Turkey)	Kıran, Ronahi	1.75 m (5 ft 9 in)	26 – 11 February 2000
PF	33	(Montenegro)	Kovačević, Bojana	1.86 m (6 ft 1 in)	29 – 16 October 1996

Head coach

- (Turkey) İstemihan Örücü

Assistant coach(es)

- (Turkey) Kürşat Keskintimur

Legend

- (C) Team captain
- Injured

- Roster
Updated: 6 October 2026
