= Eisvögel USC Freiburg =

German basketball team

- Nickname: Eisvögel (Kingfishers)
- Leagues: 1. Damen-Basketball-Bundesliga
- Founded: 1972
- Arena: Universitäts-Sporthalle
- Capacity: 1,200
- Location: Freiburg im Breisgau, Germany
- Head coach: Victor Herbosa
- Website: usc-eisvoegel.de
Home	Away

Eisvögel USC Freiburg is a German women's professional basketball team based in Freiburg im Breisgau.

As of 2022, the team is the reigning champion of the 1. Damen-Basketball-Bundesliga, the highest level of basketball in Germany.

The team brought the first national championship to the city of Freiburg im Breisgau in 115 years.

== History ==
After their promotion to the 1st women's basketball league in 2000, Eisvögel went on to be runners-up in the German 2001/02 season Championships. They maintained high ranking in the table when, in the 2005/06 season, the team placed second in the second half of the season.

The following year saw Eisvögel place fourth in the Bundesliga, with a much younger team. The team repeated their fourth position in the Budesliga in the 2007/08 season, achieving third place in the DBBL cup competition. The 2008/09 season ended with Eisvögel in ninth place. Despite this setback, the team went on to finish third, in the season of 2011/12, before going on to win their first national title in 2013, at the final tournament in Freiburg.

In 2017, after seventeen years of playing in the Budesliga, Eisvögel were relegated to the second division. Under coach Pierre Hohn, they returned to the first division in the 2017/18 season, after which point Hohn left the team. He was succeeded by Hanna Ballhaus.

In the 2020/2021 anniversary season, the club's resources were impaired due to COVID-19 associated restrictions and regulations. Consequently, to improve finances, a crowdfunding endeavour was launched by the club, with Betty BBQ, a renowned Freiburg drag queen, acting as an ambassador for the cause. Following the completion of the season, Hanna Ballhaus and Isabel Fernandez departed from the Eisvogel team, with Harald Janson taking their place.

On April 29, 2022, Eisvögel won the German Championship with a 3-1 victory against the Rheinland Lions (formerly SG Bergische Löwen).

In 2021/22, the second team of Eisvögel was promoted to the second Bundesliga. Victor Herbosa, the previous assistant coach of the team, became head coach the same year.

In May 2023, Janson returned to the position of head coach, with Herbosa returning to his native Spain.

== Notable players ==
Note: Flags indicate national team eligibility at FIBA-sanctioned events. Players may hold other non-FIBA nationalities not displayed.

Criteria

To appear in this section a player must have either:

- Set a club record or won an individual award while at the club
- Played at least one official international match for their national team at any time
- Played at least one official NBA match at any time.

- (Germany) Emilly Kapitza
- (Germany) Lina Sontag
- (Israel) Anton Shoutvin
- (United States) Hannah Little
