= TSV 1880 Wasserburg =

- Leagues: Damen-Basketball-Bundesliga
- Founded: 1955 (Basketball department)
- Location: Wasserburg am Inn, Germany
- Team colors: Red, Blue, White,
- Championships: 11 German champions 8 German Basketball Cup
- Website: basketball-wasserburg.de

TSV 1880 Wasserburg is a German multi-sport club, best known for its basketball department. In 2017 its women's basketball team won its fifth national championship in a row and its eleventh overall.

== Titles ==
- Women's basketball
  - Bundesliga
    - 2004, 2005, 2006, 2007, 2008, 2011, 2013, 2014, 2015, 2016, 2017
  - German Basketball Cup
    - 2005, 2006, 2007, 2011, 2014, 2015, 2016, 2017, 2018
