= Feride Akalan =

Turkish basketball player (born 2001)

Feride Şevval Akalan

No. 2 – Galatasaray
- Position: Small forward
- League: Turkish Super League; EuroLeague Women

Personal information
- Born: 14 October 2001 (age 25) Istanbul, Turkey
- Listed height: 1.85 m (6 ft 1 in)

Career information
- Playing career: 2014–present

Career history
- 2014–2019: Istanbul University
- 2019–2022: Çukurova Basketbol
- 2019–2020: →Mersin University
- 2022–2024: Nesibe Aydın GSK
- 2024–2026: Çukurova Basketbol
- 2026–: Galatasaray

Feride Şevval Akalan (born 14 October 2001) is a Turkish female basketball player. The 1.85 m (6 ft 1 in) tall national plays small forward.

== Career ==
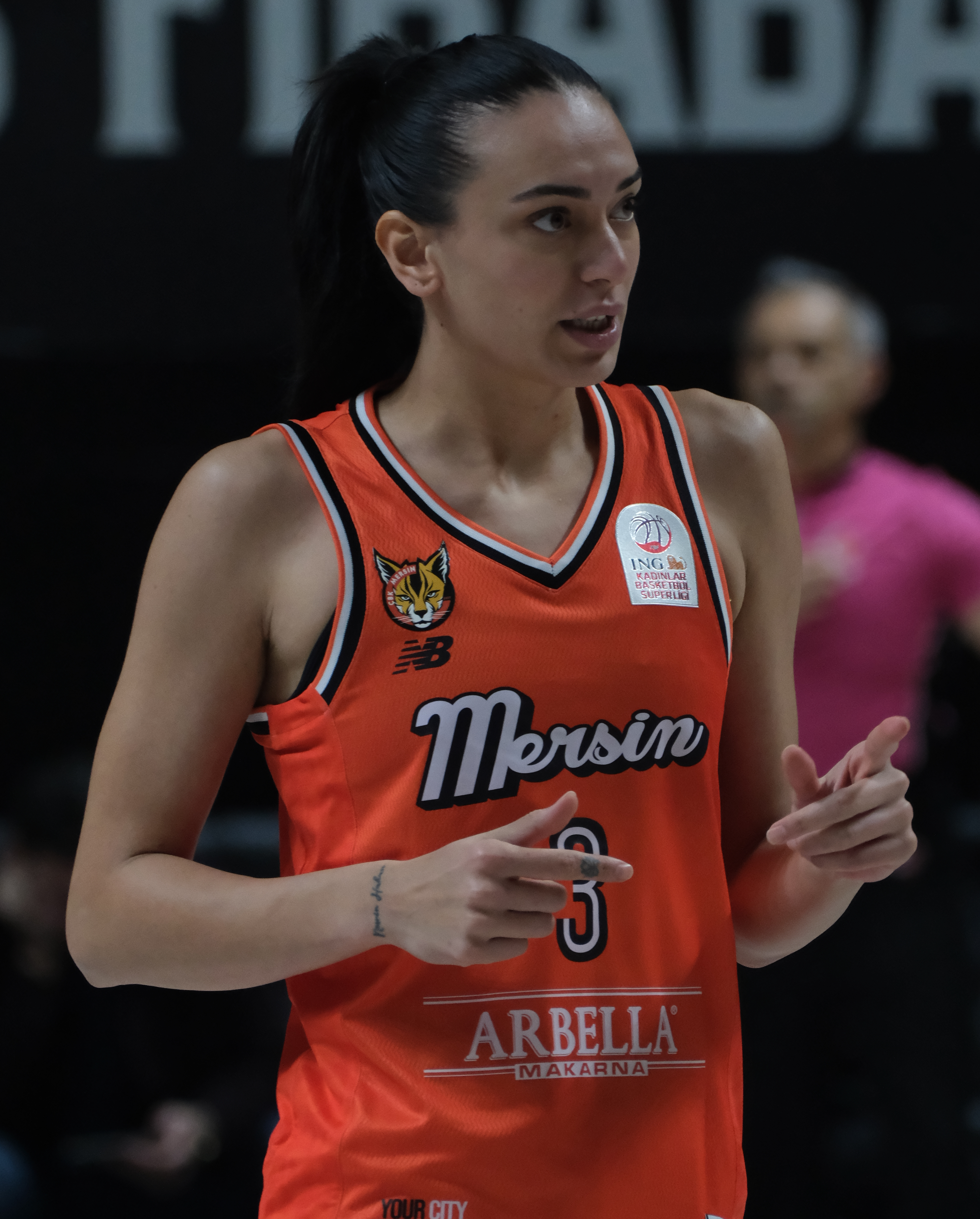
Akalan in 2025

Akalan was a member of Istanbul University and Çukurova Basketbol, which loaned out her to Mersin University. Currently, she plays in the Super League for the Ankara-based club Nesibe Aydın GSK.

On July 24, 2026, she signed a one-year contract with Galatasaray.

== International ==
She was part of the national U-16 team at the 2017 European Youth Summer Olympic Festival in Győr, Hungary that won the bronze medal.

In January 2022, she was admitted to the national team. She took part at the 2022 Mediterranean Games in Oran, Algeria. She played at the EuroBasket Women 2023 qualification.
