= Charli Collier =

American basketball player (born 1999)

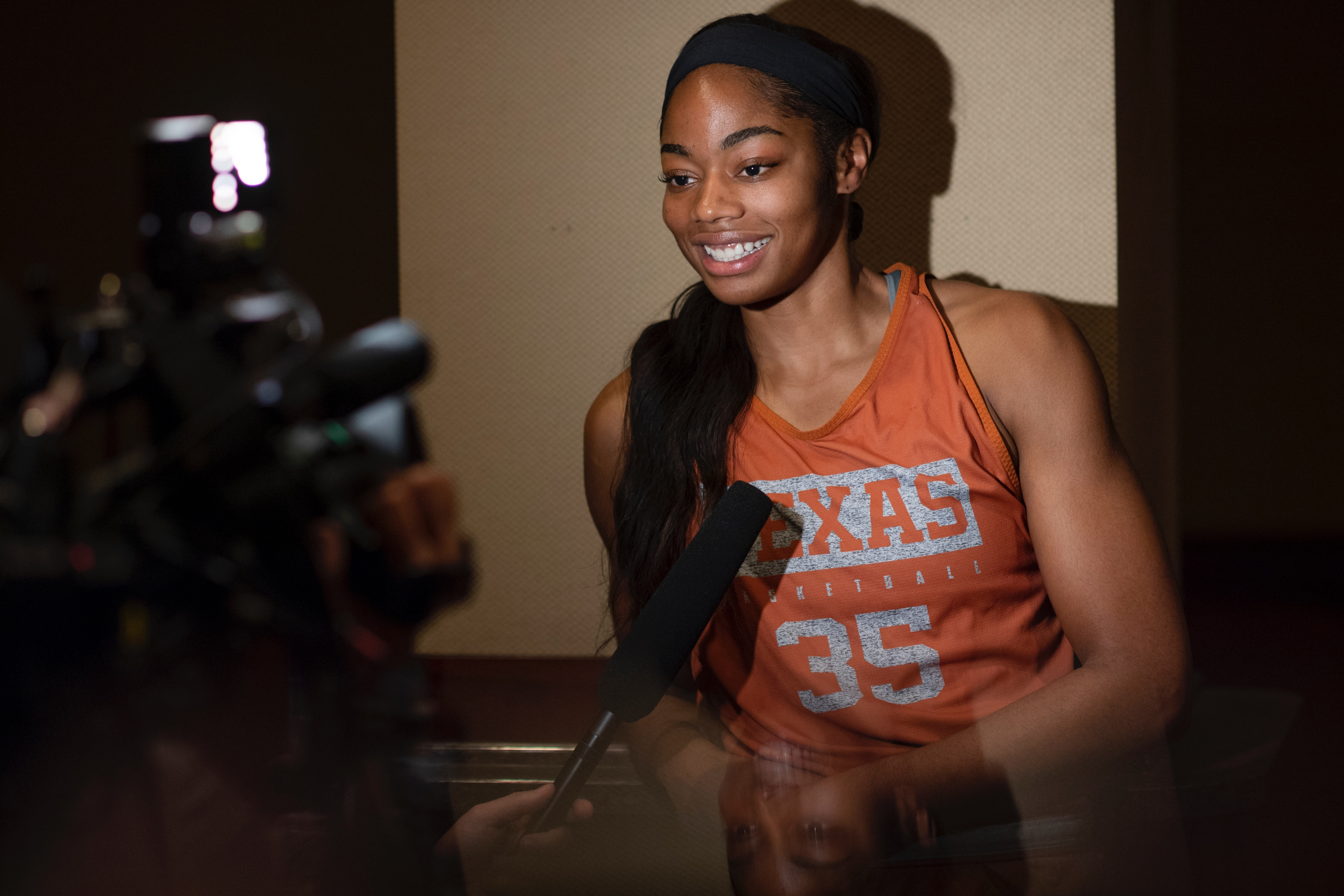

İstanbul Gençlik
- Position: Center
- League: Turkish Super League

Personal information
- Born: September 22, 1999 (age 27) Mont Belvieu, Texas, U.S.
- Listed height: 6 ft 5 in (1.96 m)
- Listed weight: 188 lb (85 kg)

Career information
- High school: Barbers Hill (Mont Belvieu, Texas)
- College: Texas (2018–2021)
- WNBA draft: 2021: 1st round, 1st overall pick
- Drafted by: Dallas Wings
- Playing career: 2021–present

Career history
- 2021–2022: Dallas Wings
- 2021–2022: Beretta Famila Schio
- 2022–2023: Ramat Hasharon
- 2023: KGHM BC Polkowice
- 2023–2024: Heilongjiang Dragons
- 2024–2025: UC Capitals
- 2025–2026: Kayseri Basketbol
- 2026–present: İstanbul Gençlik SK

Career highlights
- WNBA All-Rookie Team (2021); Second-team All-American – AP, USBWA (2021); 2× First-team All-Big 12 (2020, 2021); Big 12 All-Defensive Team (2021); McDonald's All-American (2018); Texas Miss Basketball (2018)
- Stats at Basketball Reference

Charli Elionne Collier (born September 22, 1999) is an American professional basketball player for İstanbul Gençlik SK of the Turkish Super League. She played two seasons for the Dallas Wings in the WNBA, where she was the first overall pick of the 2021 WNBA draft.

Collier played for the Texas Longhorns in college, where she was a second-team All-American and two-time first-team All Big-12 player. Internationally, she has represented the United States and won a bronze medal in the 2016 FIBA Under-17 World Championship for Women.

== High school career ==
Collier was a four-year letter winner for Barbers Hill High School in the greater Houston area. She was ranked the nation's top player in the Class of 2018 according to Prospects Nation and the Blue Star Report, and the No. 2 Player by espnW Hoop Gurlz.

Collier was a 2018 McDonald's All-American, a Jordan Brand Classic participant and the 2017–18 Gatorade State Girls Basketball Player of the Year. She was a USA Today All-USA Texas Girls Basketball First-Team Selection in 2018 and was a finalist for the Naismith Trophy High School Player of the Year Award.

Collier finished her prep career with 3,539 points and 1,406 rebounds.

As a freshman in 2014–15, she averaged 17.3 points per game, 7.3 rebounds per game and 1.7 blocks per game to help her team to a 28–4 record and a Region 5A semifinals appearance.

As a sophomore in 2015–16, Collier averaged 24.6 points per game, 9.8 rebounds per game and 2.3 blocks per game to help Barbers Hill to a 27–8 record and an appearance in the Region 5A semifinals. She was named the 2016 UIL District 21-5A Offensive MVP and was an All-District selection.

As a junior in 2016–17, she helped Barbers hill to a 34–5 record, including an 18–0 record in District 21-5A, as her squad advanced to the Texas Class 5A state semifinals. She averaged 23.8 points per game, 10.0 rebounds per game and 3.0 blocks per game. Collier was named to the 2017 UIL Class 5A State All-Tournament Team and was a nominee for the Gatorade Player of the Year Award.

As a senior in 2017–18, Collier averaged 30.9 points per game, 11.5 rebounds per game, 2.3 steals per game, 2.2 blocks per game and 2.0 assists per game in leading her team to a 38–3 record and an appearance in the Class 5A, Region 3 tournament semifinals.

== College career ==
Collier played college basketball for the Texas Longhorns. As a freshman in 2018–19, Collier played in 31 games with one start, averaging 14.4 minutes per game. She averaged 4.9 points per game, Collier scored in double figures on eight occasions during the year and led the Longhorns with 20 blocks.

Collier didn't see the playing time or success in her freshman season that she had hoped, and struggled adjusting to the timing and physicality of the collegiate game. Instead of looking to transfer, Collier turned inward and focused on improving. Through that experience, Collier has transformed herself into one of the nation's top players.

Collier had a breakout game in her team's win against No. 1 Stanford on December 22, 2019. She brought down a career-high 19 rebounds and scored a game-high 20 points in 37 minutes of play. The 19 rebounds were the eighth-most in a single game in program history. For her efforts, Collier earned espnW and USBWA National Player of the Week honors.

Collier turned in one of the best sophomore seasons in program history, ranking third in rebounds (314) and eighth in blocks (39) among Texas sophomores all-time.

In her junior season, Collier was the only NCAA Division I player to average at least 20.0 points per game and 12.0 rebounds per game. She has increased her points per game average by more than eight points from her sophomore to her junior season. Collier has recorded 20 or more points on 16 occasions as a junior, including a career-high 44 points against North Texas on November 29, 2020, marking the most by a Texas player since 1994. Collier had a breakout sophomore season in 2019–20, earning First-Team All-Big 12 Conference accolades. She started all 30 games at the center position for the Longhorns, playing 29.8 minutes per game. Collier was tied for the team lead in scoring (13.1 points per game) and led the Longhorns in rebounding (10.5 rebounds per game). She ranked 20th nationally in rebounds per game (10.5) and 23rd in total rebounds (314).

Collier was one of only six players in the Big 12 Conference that season to average a double-double on the year. She ranked 16th nationally in double-doubles with 16 and she was one of only four players in program history to average a points-rebounds double-double for a single season.

Collier was one of five finalists for the 2021 Lisa Leslie Award, which recognizes the top center in women's college basketball. She was also a semifinalist for the Naismith Trophy and was one of 15 finalists for the Wooden Award.

== Professional career ==
Collier was selected by the Dallas Wings as the first overall pick in the 2021 WNBA draft. The Wings had both the first and second overall picks that year after a trade with the New York Liberty; Dallas selected Awak Kuier immediately after Collier. Collier played in 28 out of 32 games for the Wings in her rookie season, starting 18 of them. Collier averaged 3.4 points and 3.6 rebounds per game; the Wings finished 14-18 and did not make the playoffs. She was named to the 2021 WNBA Rookie team after the conclusion of the season.

In her second season, Collier's production significantly dropped, as she played only 17 games exclusively off the bench, and averaged only 2.0 points and 0.6 rebounds per game. She was waived by the Wings in May 2023 along with 2019 first-round pick Kalani Brown.

After being released by the Wings, Collier played for professional teams in Italy, Israel, Poland, and China between 2021 and 2023.

In September 2024, she signed with the UC Capitals of the WNBL in Australia.

Collier signed with Kayseri Basketbol of the Turkish Super League for the 2025–26 season.

== National team career ==
Collier was a member of the United States U-17 Women's National Team that won a bronze medal at the 2016 World Championships. She also participated in the 2017 USA U19 World Cup Team Trials and the 2015 USA U16 National Team Trials. She also represented the United States in the inaugural FIBA 3x3 Women's Series in the summer of 2019.

== Career statistics ==
=== Regular season ===
Year	Team	GP	GS	MPG	FG%	3P%	FT%	RPG	APG	SPG	BPG	TO	PPG
2021	Dallas	28	18	12.3	.465	.000	.696	3.6	0.2	0.1	0.2	0.5	3.4
2022	Dallas	17	0	4.6	.444	.000	.714	0.6	0.1	0.1	0.0	0.6	2.0
Career	2 years, 1 team	45	18	9.4	.460	.000	.703	2.5	0.2	0.1	0.1	0.5	2.9

=== College ===
Year	Team	GP	GS	MPG	FG%	3P%	FT%	RPG	APG	SPG	BPG	TO	PPG
2018–19	Texas	31	1	14.3	41.8	29.4	80.0	4.3	0.2	0.4	0.6	1.7	5.9
2019–20	Texas	30	30	29.7	43.2	35.4	77.1	10.5	0.5	0.6	1.3	2.1	13.1
2020–21	Texas	31	31	32.6	51.1	31.3	80.1	11.3	0.4	0.7	1.2	2.7	19.0
Career		92	62	25.5	46.6	33.3	79.3	8.7	0.4	0.6	1.1	2.2	12.7
Statistics retrieved from Sports-Reference.

== Personal life ==
Collier is the daughter of Ponda and the late Elliott Collier. She has a brother, Casey, who played football for the University of Southern California. Her mother played basketball at Southwestern University and her father played basketball at Eastern Montana College.

Collier is interested in pursuing a career in sports broadcasting following her playing career. Collier has hosted her own online show in preparation for her future career, and has interviewed high-profile guests like Kevin Durant of the Houston Rockets.

Growing up, Collier's family was friends with Retha Swindell, the University of Texas' all-time career rebounds leader and the first African-American woman to play basketball for the Longhorns. Collier interviewed Swindell for Longhorn Network during the 2020 season to discuss their common bond.
