= Melahat Aydın =

Turkish basketball player

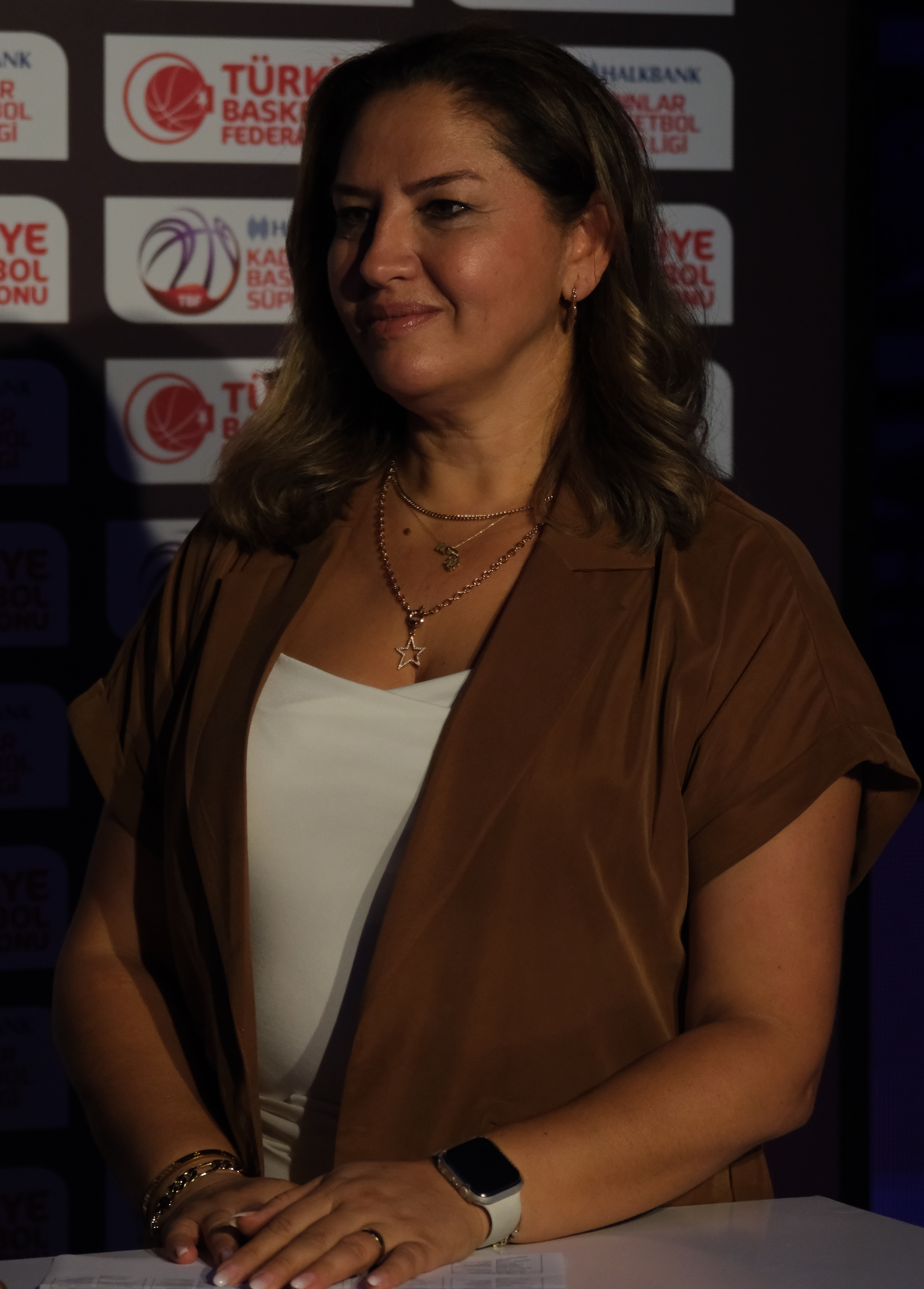

Galatasaray

Personal information
- Born: 14 March 1977 (age 49) Tarsus, Turkey
- Listed height: 5 ft 9 in (1.75 m)

Career information
- Playing career: 1993–2005

Career history

Playing
- –: Botaş SK
- –: Güre Belediyesi
- –: İstanbul Üniversitesi
- –: Migros
- –: Erdemirspor
- –: Ceyhan Belediyesi
- –: Mersin Büyükşehir Belediyespor

Coaching
- 2007–2014: Tarsus Belediye Spor Kulübü (General Manager)
- 2014–2019: Mersin Büyükşehir Belediyespor (General Manager)
- 2020–2022: Turkey U-20 (Team Manager)
- 2021–present: Galatasaray (Administrative Manager)

Melahat Aydın (born 14 March 1977) is a Turkish former professional basketball player. She is currently the administrative manager of the Galatasaray.

== Post-playing career ==
She was appointed as the administrative manager of Galatasaray Women's Basketball Team on 17 November 2021.

== Personal life ==
Aydın, one of the experienced managers of women's basketball, is a graduate of Çukurova University, Department of Physical Education. He is married and has two children.
