= Ekrem Memnun =

Turkish basketball coach

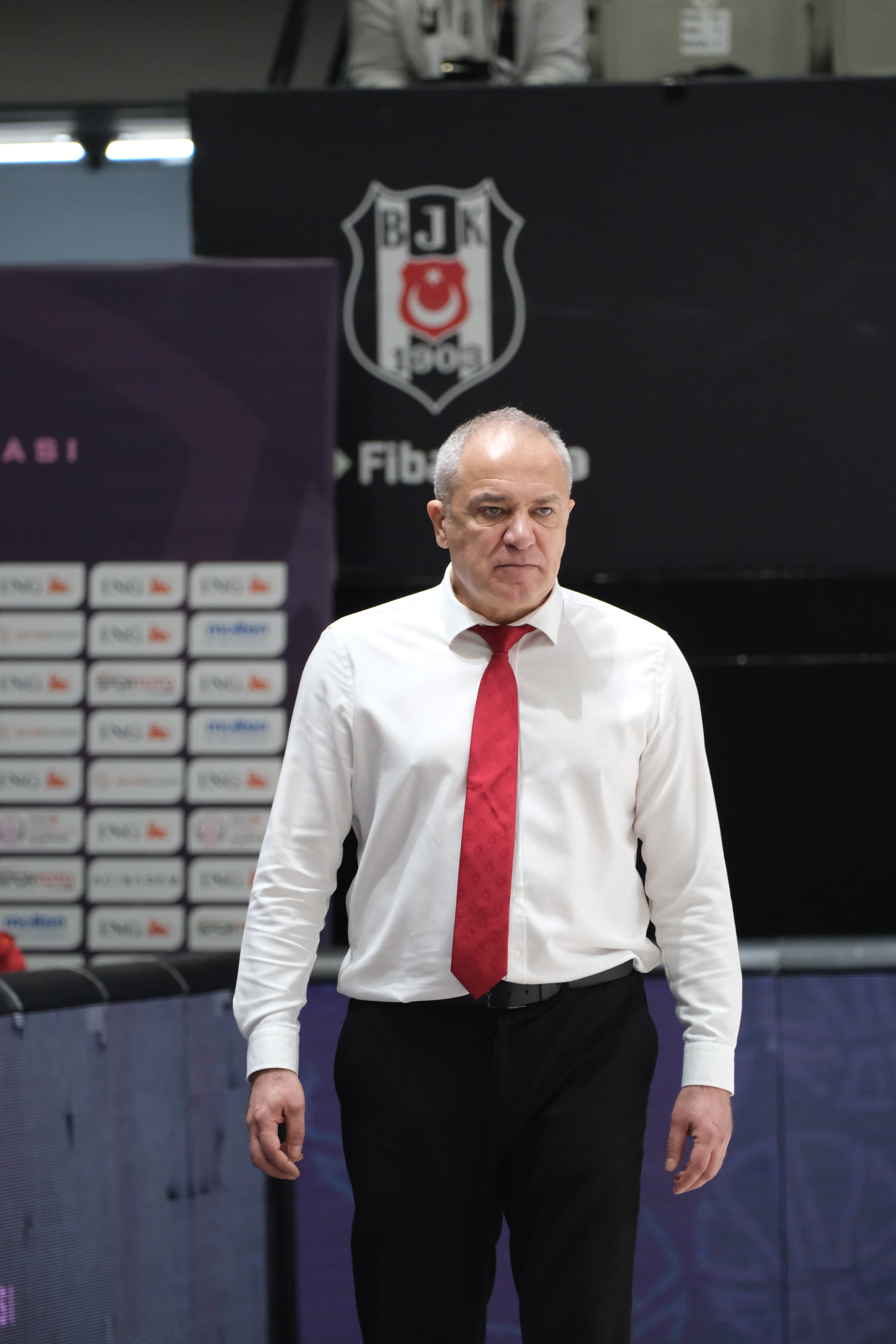
- Ekrem Memnun

Personal information
- Born: July 16, 1969 (age 57)
- Position: Head coach
- Coaching career: 1988–present

Career history

Coaching
- 1988–1992: Galatasaray (women) (assistant)
- 1992–1995: Yıldırımspor
- 1995–1996: Galatasaray (men) (assistant)
- 1996–2002: Galatasaray (women)
- 2002: Galatasaray (men) (assistant)
- 2003–2005: Sigal Prishtina
- 2005–2008: Efes Pilsen (assistant)
- 2008–2010: Darüşşafaka Cooper Tires
- 2012–2016: Galatasaray (women)
- 2015–2018: Turkey (women)
- 2021–2022: Galatasaray (men)
- 2022: Sigal Prishtina
- 2022–2025: Turkey (women)
- 2022–2023: Çukurova Basketbol
- 2024–2025: Galatasaray (women)
- 2026: ÇBK Mersin

Career highlights
- EuroLeague winner (2014); EuroCup winner (2026); EuroLeague Coach of the Year (2014); 5× Turkish Super League champion (1997, 1998, 2000, 2014, 2015); 4× Turkish Cup winner (1997, 1998, 2013, 2014); 3× Turkish Presidential Cup (1996, 1997, 1998); Kosovo Cup winner (2005); Turkish Super League Coach of the Year (2015); Kosovar League Coach of the Year (2005)

Ekrem Memnun (born 16 July 1969) is a Turkish basketball coach.

== Coaching career ==
Ekrem Memnun started his coaching career in the Galatasaray youth team in 1988. After serving as assistant coach of the women's team and in charge of infrastructure, Memnun took over Yıldırım Spor in 1992 and stayed there for three years.

In 1995, he returned to the Galatasaray Men's Basketball Team as assistant coach and became the head coach of Galatasaray women's basketball team between 1996 and 2002, and in the 1998-1999 season, he and his team won the third place in the Euroleague, one of the greatest achievements in women's basketball up to that date. During this time, three Turkish League (1996-1997, 1997-1998, 1999-2000) three President Cup (1996, 1997, 1998) and two in Turkey Cup (1997, 1998) was the head of the winning team.

Working as assistant coach in the Galatasaray Men's Basketball Team under the management of Erman Kunter in 2002, Memnun became the head coach of the Kosovo team Sigal Prishtina in 2003, where he was the regular season leader, a Kosovo Cup, a Kosovo National Cup and a Kosovo Super The trophy saw successes.

=== Efes Pilsen (2005–2008) ===
In 2005, he again returned to Turkey to become the assistant coach of Efes Pilsen coach Oktay Mahmuti, he continued in this position for three seasons.

=== Darüşşafaka Cooper Tires (2008–2010) ===
He became the head coach of Darüşşafaka Cooper Tires in 2008 and stayed there for two seasons.

=== Galatasaray (women) (2012–2016) ===
Ekrem Memnun, who started running the Galatasaray Odeabank Women's Basketball Team on June 13, 2012, beat Fenerbahçe 3-2 in the league and reached the championship after 14 years. On April 13, 2014, she won the championship by overthrowing the arch-rival Fenerbahçe in the Euroleague Women final, and women achieved the greatest success in basketball history on the basis of clubs. Having brought Galatasaray Odebank to the top of the league and Europe, Memnun completed the 2013-14 season with 3 trophies with the victory of the Presidential Cup.

=== Turkey (women) (2015–2018) ===
February 10, 2015 he has started to coach National Women's Basketball Team, and it lasted in two different terms until December 10, 2018.

=== Galatasaray (men) (2021–2022) ===
On January 14, 2021, he has signed with Galatasaray, but it's his first opportunity for the head coach position.

=== Sigal Prishtina (2022) ===
On June 17, 2022, he has signed with KB Prishtina of the Kosovo Basketball Superleague.

=== Turkey (women) (2022–2025) ===
On 30 September 2022, Memnun was appointed as the head coach of the National Women's Basketball Team after parting ways with Ceyhun Yıldızoğlu.

=== Çukurova Basketbol (2022–2023) ===
On 10 December 2022, it was announced that she signed a contract with Çukurova Basketbol, one of the teams of the Turkish Women's Basketball League. It was announced that they parted ways on January 6, 2023.

=== Galatasaray (women) (2024–2025) ===
It was announced that she signed a contract with Galatasaray Çağdaş Faktoring on 22 March 2024. It was reported that the contract will be valid for the 2024–25 and 2025–26 seasons.

On November 14, 2025, it was announced that the team parted ways with Galatasaray by mutual agreement.

== Personal life ==
Memnun is of Albanian descent. His family comes from Preševo.
