= 2026–27 Turkish Women's Basketball League =

Turkish Women's Basketball League
- Season: 2026–27
- Teams: 11

The 2026–27 Turkish Women's Basketball League will be the 33rd season of the second division women's basketball league in Turkey since its establishment in 1994. It will start in October 2026 with the first round of the regular season and end in April 2027.

The fixtures were released on 5 August 2026.

== League standings ==
Pos	Team	Pld	W	L	PF	PA	PD	Pts	Qualification
1	Kırklareli Bld.	5	5	0	410	342	+68	10	Promotion to Women's Basketball Super League
2	TED Kolejliler	5	4	1	433	390	+43	9	Advance to playoffs
3	Mersin Basketbol	5	3	2	395	396	−1	8	Advance to playoffs
4	İstanbul Utku	5	3	2	312	313	−1	8	Advance to playoffs
5	Gallardo	4	3	1	260	251	+9	7	Advance to playoffs
6	Bodrum Basketbol	4	2	2	300	283	+17	6	Advance to playoffs
7	Fenerbahçe Gelişim	5	1	4	366	355	+11	6	Advance to playoffs
8	Konya Basket	4	2	2	223	213	+10	6	Advance to playoffs
9	Burhaniye Belediyespor	4	1	3	291	282	+9	5	Advance to playoffs
10	Emlak Konut Gelişim	4	1	3	246	255	−9	5	
11	Darıca Basketbol Feneri	5	0	5	220	376	−156	5	Relegation to KBBL

Updated to match(es) played on 9 November 2026. Source: TKBL
Rules for classification: 1) Points; 2) Points difference; 3) Points scored.

== Awards ==
All official awards of the 2026–27 Kadınlar Basketbol Ligi.

=== MVP of the Round ===
Round	Player	Team	EFF	Ref.
1	(United States) Monique Spearman	TED Kolejliler	35	
2	(Rwanda) Janai Crooms	İstanbul Utku	42	
3	(United States) Samone Grayson	Bodrum Basketbol	37	
4	(United States) Kirsten Deans	TED Kolejliler	34	
5	(United States) Aliyah Matharu	Mersin Basketbol	30	
