= Samsun Basketbol =

Turkish women's basketball team

- Founded: 2021; 5 years ago
- Arena: Mustafa Dağıstanlı Sports Hall
- Capacity: 2,000
- Location: Samsun, Turkey
- Team colors: Blue-White-Red
- President: Ergin Zorlu
- Head coach: Mehmet Özkan

Zorlu Koleji Samsun Basketbol Kulübü, also shortly known as Samsun Basketbol, is a Turkish women's basketball club based in Samsun, Turkey. The club was founded in 2021 .

== History ==
The club promoted to the Women's Basketball Super League after finishing the Turkish Women's Basketball League season as champions.

Following the conclusion of the season, it was announced that head coach Murat Saat had departed the club. After the team's promotion to the Women's Basketball Super League, a new board of directors, chaired by Ergin Zorlu, was announced on 20 May 2026. On 22 May 2026, Mehmet Özkan was appointed as the club's new head coach.

The club announced its withdrawal from competitive basketball, citing insufficient financial support.
