= 1991–92 FIBA Women's European Champions Cup =

Basket-ball Championship

The 1991–92 FIBA Women's European Champions Cup was the 34th edition of the competition. It was won by Popular Basquet Godella, today known as Ciudad Ros Casares Valencia, beating Dynamo Kyiv (representing the CIS following the breakup of the Soviet Union) in the final. Godella became the first Spanish team to win the competition.

== Competition results ==
=== 2nd Preliminary Round ===
Team 1	Agg.	Team 2	1st leg	2nd leg
Falcon Copenhague (Denmark)	138-202	(Germany) Agon Düsseldorf	69-102	69-100
Elitzur Holon (Israel)	125-156	(Greece) Sporting Athens	68-85	57-71
Magyar Testgyakorlók Köre (Hungary)	170-142	(Albania) 17 Nëntori Tirana	101-72	69-70
Pussihukat Vantaa (Finland)	114-217	(Commonwealth of Independent States) Dynamo Kyiv Aspro	77-155	37-102
SCP Ružomberok (Czechoslovakia)	164-152	(Turkey) Galatasaray S.K.	96-64	68-88
Dorna Godella (Spain)	156-80	(Belgium) BCSS Namur	76-43	80-37
Šibenik (Socialist Federal Republic of Yugoslavia)	(Walkover)	(Romania) Universitatea-Dacia Cluj	-	-
BBC Etzella Ettelbruck (Luxembourg)	98-214	(France) Challes Savoie Basket	48-125	50-89
Lokomotiv Sofia (Bulgaria)	238-107	(Cyprus) Olympias Neapoleos	125-43	113-64
Nuva Den Helder (Netherlands)	106-122	(Poland) Polfa Pabianice	55-58	51-64

=== 3rd Preliminary Round ===
Team 1	Agg.	Team 2	1st leg	2nd leg
Agon Düsseldorf (Germany)	138-191	(Greece) Sporting Athens	68-107	70-84
Magyar Testgyakorlók Köre (Hungary)	142-186	(Commonwealth of Independent States) Dynamo Kyiv Aspro	77-89	65-97
SCP Ružomberok (Czechoslovakia)	151-172	(Spain) Dorna Godella	82-88	69-84
Universitatea-Dacia Cluj (Romania)	128-168	(France) Challes Savoie Basket	61-80	67-88
Lokomotiv Sofia (Bulgaria)	129-196	(Sweden) Sparbanken Arvika Basket	70-109	59-87
Polfa Pabianice (Poland)	122-164	(Italy) Ginnastica Comense	72-86	50-78

=== Semi-final Round ===
	Team	Pld	W	L	PF	PA
1.	(Spain) Dorna Godella	10	10	0	806	693
2.	(Commonwealth of Independent States) Dynamo Kyiv Aspro	10	6	4	781	768
3.	(Italy) Ginnastica Comense	10	5	5	731	699
4.	(Greece) Sporting Athens	10	5	5	718	781
5.	(France) Challes Savoie Basket	10	4	6	629	698
6.	(Sweden) Sparbanken Arvika Basket	10	0	10	729	853

=== Final Four ===
Semi-finals
(Spain) Dorna Godella	87
(Greece) Sporting Athens	61
(Commonwealth of Independent States) Dynamo Kyiv Aspro	85
(Italy) Ginnastica Comense	77

Final
(Spain) Dorna Godella	66
(Commonwealth of Independent States) Dynamo Kyiv	56
Third place
(Italy) Ginnastica Comense	80
(Greece) Sporting Athens	72

=== Awards ===
Euroleague 1991–92 Champions
Dorna Godella
First title
