= Rutronik Stars Keltern =

Coordinates: 48°55′35″N 8°34′22″E

- Leagues: 1. Damen-Basketball-Bundesliga
- Founded: 1981
- Arena: Speiterlinghalle
- Location: Remchingen (seat) and Keltern (stadium and name), Germany
- Team colors: Green, orange
- Main sponsor: Rutronik
- Head coach: Christian Hergenröther
- Ownership: FC Nöttingen
- Championships: 5 German champions 2 German Basketball Cup
- Website: rutronik-stars-keltern.de

The Rutronik Stars Keltern are the women's basketball department of the club FC Nöttingen in Remchingen, Germany. The game is played in the neighboring municipality of Keltern, and the venue for the home games is the sports hall in the Speiterlinghalle.

== History ==
The club was founded in Keltern in 1981. In 2012 the team was taken over by FC Nöttingen. At that time the name Grüner Stern Keltern was still used. In the 2015 season Keltern became champions in the 2nd women's basketball league group south and was promoted to the 1st women's basketball league. With this rise, the name was changed to Rutronik Stars Keltern. The club has been financially supported by the Rutronik company since its promotion. Rutronik is a sponsor of several sports clubs in the Enzkreis and in Pforzheim. In 2018 and 2021, Keltern won the German championship title, each time coached by Christian Hergenröther.

In 2016, 2018 and 2021 they took part in the Eurocup Women. In 2016 they reached the round of 16.

== Successes ==
- German Champion: 2018, 2021, 2023, 2025, 2026
- Eurocup Women participations: 2016, 2018, 2021, 2022, 2023, 2024, 2025, 2026
- German Basketball Cup winner: 2020, 2021

== Notable players ==
Note: Flags indicate national team eligibility at FIBA-sanctioned events. Players may hold other non-FIBA nationalities not displayed.

Criteria

To appear in this section a player must have either:

- Set a club record or won an individual award while at the club
- Played at least one official international match for their national team at any time
- Played at least one official NBA match at any time.

- (Slovakia) Veronika Remenárová
