= İstanbul Gençlik SK =

Turkish women's basketball team

- Leagues: Turkish Super League
- Founded: 1995; 31 years ago
- Arena: Ahmet Cömert Sport Hall
- Capacity: 3,500
- Location: Istanbul, Turkey
- Team colors: Red-Black-White
- President: Ümit Aslan
- Head coach: Alper Durur
Home	Away

İstanbul Gençlik Spor Kulübü, commonly known as İstanbul Gençlik, is a Turkish professional multi-sport club based in Istanbul, Turkey. The club was founded in 1995 and underwent a restructuring in 2019.

Its women's basketball team is currently competing in the Women's Basketball Super League. The team promoted to the Women's Basketball Super League at the end of the 2025–26 season.

== Current roster ==
İstanbul Gençlik Spor Kulübü roster
Players
Coaches

Pos.	No.	Nat.	Name	Ht.	Age
PF	1	(Turkey)	Tonguç, Sevgi	1.86 m (6 ft 1 in)	23 – 27 October 2002
PG	2	(Sweden) (Turkey)	Karaoğlan, Günesh	1.70 m (5 ft 7 in)	29 – 1 June 1997
SF	3	(Turkey)	Topuz, İrem Naz	1.76 m (5 ft 9 in)	29 – 3 February 1997
SF	4	(Turkey)	Sönmez, Şuğranur	1.83 m (6 ft 0 in)	25 – 3 April 2001
G	5	(Turkey)	Topçu, Eydina		27 – 25 August 1999
PG	7	(Turkey)	Gezgin, Damla	1.73 m (5 ft 8 in)	36 – 7 September 1990
SF	8	(Turkey)	Boybeyi, Helin	1.84 m (6 ft 0 in)	31 – 21 April 1995
PG	9	(United States)	Slocum, Destiny	1.70 m (5 ft 7 in)	29 – 9 September 1997
PG	10	(Turkey)	Özışık, Özge	1.70 m (5 ft 7 in)	35 – 27 June 1991
C	14	(Serbia)	Stanković, Dragana	1.96 m (6 ft 5 in)	31 – 18 January 1995
C	19	(Turkey)	Sezer, Gizem	1.94 m (6 ft 4 in)	32 – 20 September 1994
G	24	(Puerto Rico)	Guirantes, Arella	1.80 m (5 ft 11 in)	29 – 15 October 1997
C	35	(United States)	Collier, Charli	1.96 m (6 ft 5 in)	27 – 22 September 1999

Head coach

- (Turkey) Alper Durur

Assistant coach(es)

- (Turkey) Çağatay Saltık

Legend

- (C) Team captain
- Injured

- Roster
Updated: 5 October 2026
