= DJK Agon 08 Düsseldorf =

German football and sports club

- Full name: DJK AGON 08 - Mörsenbroicher Sportverein e.V., Düsseldorf
- Founded: 1908
- Ground: Sportplatz an der St-Franziskus-Straße
- President: Manfred Novacek
- Head coaches: Marc Wilgenbus; Marcus Niggemann
- League: Kreisliga A Gruppe 1 (VIII)
- 2015–16: 3rd
- Website: https://djk-agon08.com/

DJK Agon 08 Düsseldorf is a German football and sports club from Düsseldorf.

Its women's basketball section dominated the Bundesliga through the 1980s winning eleven championships between 1980 and 1991, and reached the final of the European Cup in 1983 and 1986 under the guidance of coach Tony DiLeo. Agon Düsseldorf also has athletics, badminton, handball, tennis, table tennis and volleyball teams. The men's football squad plays in Kreisliga A (VIII).

== Titles ==
- Women's basketball
  - Bundesliga
    - 1975, 1980, 1981, 1982, 1983, 1984, 1985, 1986, 1987, 1988, 1990, 1991
  - German Basketball Cup
    - 1980, 1981, 1983, 1984, 1985, 1986, 1988
- Football
  - Kreisliga A (VIII)
    - 2010
  - Kreisliga B (VIII)
    - 2006
