= Frédéric Dusart =

French basketball coach

Galatasaray
- Position: Head coach
- League: Turkish Super League; EuroLeague Women

Personal information
- Born: March 23, 1978 (age 48) Valenciennes, Nord, France
- Coaching career: 2000–present

Career history

Coaching
- 2000–2004: Saint-Saulve
- 2005–2012: ESB Villeneuve-d'Ascq (assistant)
- 2012–2019: ESB Villeneuve-d'Ascq
- 2019–2025: Castors Braine
- 2025–2026: Sichuan Yuanda Meile
- 2026–present: Galatasaray
- 2026–present: Turkey (women)

Frédéric Dusart (born March 23, 1978) is a French professional basketball coach.

== Career ==
Dusart in 2026

On August 18, 2026, he became the new head coach of the Galatasaray basketball team.

On 19 October 2026, Dusart was appointed head coach of the Turkish women's national team.
