= Damen-Basketball-Bundesliga =

German women's basketball leagues

- Sport: Basketball
- Founded: 2001
- No. of teams: 32
- Country: Germany
- Continent: FIBA Europe (Europe)
- Most recent champion: Rutronik Stars Keltern (5th title)
- Most titles: DJK Agon 08 Düsseldorf (12 titles)
- Level on pyramid: 1 and 2
- Domestic cup: German Basketball Cup
- Website: dbbl.de/de/

The Damen-Basketball-Bundesligen GmbH (DBBL) is a company founded in June 2001, which manages the first and the two second federal leagues of women's basketball in Germany. The shareholders of the GmbH are AG 1. DBBL, AG 2. DBBL and DBB. DBBL is based in Frankfurt am Main. Philipp Reuner has been the managing director since August 2020. His predecessors were Claus-Arwed Lauprecht, Achim Barbknecht, Birgit Kunel and Jürgen Kofner. The DBBL is responsible for marketing, public relations and the organization of game operations in the top leagues and the cup competition of German women's basketball. In 2020 it was decided to relocate the DBBL office from Bergisch Gladbach to Frankfurt.

== Leagues ==
- 1. Damen-Basketball-Bundesliga
- 2. Damen-Basketball-Bundesliga
