= CSM București =

Romanian multi-sports club

- Full name: Clubul Sportiv Municipal București
- Founded: 2007
- Based in: București, Romania
- Colours: Blue, White
- President: Alin Petrache
- Chairman: Gabriela Szabó
- Website: Club home page

Clubul Sportiv Municipal București, commonly known as CSM București is a Romanian professional multi-sports club based in Bucharest.

== Departments ==
Active branches:

- Athletics
- Basketball
- Dancesport
- Handball
- Judo
- Scrabble
- Volleyball

Defunct branches:

- Canoeing
- Chess
- Motorcycle racing
- Rugby union
- Swimming
- Tennis
- Yacht racing

== Teams ==
Active teams:

- CSM București (women's handball)
- CSM București (men's handball)

Defunct teams:

- CSM București (rugby)
- CSM București (women's volleyball)
