= Alper Durur =

Turkish basketball coach

Edremit Belediyesi Gürespor
- Position: Head coach

Personal information
- Born: April 12, 1971 (age 55) Ordu, Turkey
- Coaching career: 1989–present

Career history

Coaching
- 1989–1992: İstanbul Üniversitesi (Youth Coach)
- 1992–1996: Leventspor
- 1996–2000: Galatasaray (assistant coach)
- 2000–2001: Güre Belediyespor
- 2001–2012: İstanbul Üniversitesi
- 2012–2014: Orduspor
- 2015–2016: Yakın Doğu Üniversitesi
- 2017: Çukurova Basketbol
- 2018–2022: OGM Ormanspor
- 2022–2023: Galatasaray
- 2024–: Edremit Belediyesi Gürespor

Alper Durur (born April 12, 1971) is a Turkish professional basketball coach. He is the head coach of Edremit Belediyesi Gürespor.

== Coaching career ==
=== Yakın Doğu Üniversitesi ===
As of 3 July 2015, he was appointed as Head Coach in Yakın Doğu Üniversitesi.

=== Çukurova Basketbol ===
On 5 August 2017, it was announced that an agreement was reached with Çukurova Basketbol. On 3 December 2017, Çukurova Basketbol announced that it was parting ways with head coach Durur.

=== OGM Ormanspor ===
On 10 July 2018, it was announced that he signed a 1-year contract with OGM Ormanspor. On 6 June 2022, OGM Ormanspor announced that it was parting ways with head coach Durur.

=== Galatasaray ===
He signed a one-year contract with Galatasaray on 7 July 2022.

On 17 July 2023, he signed a new 1+1 year contract with Galatasaray.

It was announced by the club that they parted ways with Galatasaray on 9 October 2023.

=== Edremit Belediyesi Gürespor ===
He signed a one-year contract with Ferhatoğlu Edremit Belediyesi Gürespor 2025

2025 Kadınlar Federasyon Kupası'nda namağlup olarak kupa kaldırdı 19.01.2025
