= Ferencvárosi TC (women's basketball) =

- Leagues: Second Division
- Founded: 1993
- History: 1993–2000, 2010–2012
- Arena: FTC Új csarnok
- Location: Budapest, Hungary
- Team colors: Green and white
- President: -
- Championships: 1 Hungarian League; 1 Hungarian Cup
- Website: www.fradikosar.hu
Home

Ferencvárosi Torna Club Női Kosárlabda-Szakosztály was a Hungarian women's basketball team from Budapest. Established in 1993 as a section of sports club Ferencvárosi TC, it won the 1996 national cup and the 1997 national championship. In 1995 and 1998 it played the FIBA Euroleague.

The team was dissolved in 2000, but in 2008 they rebuilt the team. In 2012 they dissolved again.

== Titles ==
- Hungarian Championship (1)
  - 1997
- Hungarian Cup (1)
  - 1996

== 2011–12 roster ==
- (1.93) (Hungary) Dalma Milliner
- (1.90) (Hungary) Kruzsina Fejes
- (1.88) (Hungary) Judit Barnai
- (1.88) (Hungary) Petra Russai
- (1.87) (Hungary) Nikoletta Turoczi
- (1.85) (Hungary) Krisztina Kovacs
- (1.84) (Hungary) Anna Vida
- (1.82) (Hungary) Hajnalka Szlinak
- (1.78) (Hungary) Krisztina Sule
- (1.76) (Hungary) Rita Tamas
- (1.74) (Hungary) Nora Rujak
- (1.70) (Hungary) Orsolya Englert
- (?.??) (Hungary) Borbala Kovacs
