= Lyudmila Konovalova =

Russian basketball player

Lyudmila Vasilyevna Konovalova (Russian: Людмила Васильевна Коновалова; born 7 June 1968 in Sverdlovsk, Russian SFSR, USSR) is a Russian former basketball player who competed in the 1996 Summer Olympics.
