= ASDG Comense 1872 =

Italian multisports club

- Leagues: Serie A1
- Founded: 1872; 1919 (men's basketball); 1945 (women's basketball)
- Arena: PalaSampietro
- Location: Como, Italy
- Team colors: Black and pink
- President: Antonio Pennestrì
- Head coach: Loris Barbiero
- Championships: 2 Euroleagues; 16 Italian Leagues; 5 Italian Cups; 6 Italian Supercups
- Website: comense.it
Home	Away

Associazione Sportiva Dilettantistica Ginnastica Comense 1872 is an Italian multisports club from Como with athletics, basketball, fencing and gymnastics sections. It is best known for its women's basketball team, also known as Pool Comense 1872.

Pool Comense is the most successful team in the Italian Championship with sixteen titles between 1950 and 2004. The 1990s were the team's golden era, winning nine national championships in a row between 1991 and 1999 and two Euroleagues in 1994 and 1995 from five appearances in the final between 1993 and 1999.

Comense last played the Euroleague in 2003. Most recently it was 6th in the 2011 championship.

== Titles ==
- Euroleague
  - 1994, 1995
- Serie A
  - 1950, 1951, 1952, 1953, 1991, 1992, 1993, 1994, 1995, 1996, 1997, 1998, 1998, 1999, 2002, 2004
- Coppa Italia
  - 1993, 1994, 1995, 1997, 2000
- Supercoppa
  - 1996, 1998, 1999, 2000, 2001, 2004
- Triple Crown (2) : 1993–94, 1994-95
