= Turkish Women's Basketball League =

- Formerly: TBF Turkish Women's Basketball League
- Founded: 1980; 46 years ago
- First season: 1980–81
- Country: Turkey
- Confederation: FIBA
- Number of teams: 16
- Level on pyramid: 2
- Promotion to: KBSL
- Relegation to: KBBL
- Current champions: Zorlu Koleji Samsun Basketbol (1st title) (2025–26)
- Website: tbf.org.tr
- 2026–27 Turkish Women's Basketball League

The Turkish Women's Basketball League (Turkish: Türkiye Kadınlar Basketbol Ligi, TKBL), is the second-tier level women's professional basketball division of the Turkish women's basketball league system. The league was established in 1980 and is organized by the Turkish Basketball Federation.

== Format ==
The league has 16 teams. Each team plays others in their group twice during the regular season. The team that finishes in first place promotes to the top-tier level Women's Basketball Super League (KBSL) for the next season.Teams ranked 2nd to 9th compete in a playoff format and the winner of the playoff also promotes. The lowest three teams are relegated to the third-tier level Turkish Women's Regional Basketball League (KBBL).

The Turkish Women's Basketball League continue to be played with 11 teams as of the 2026-27 season.

== Clubs (2026–27 season) ==
Team	Home city	Arena

== Champions ==
- 1994–95: Manisa Spil İhtisas Spor Kulübü
- 1995–96: Urla Belediyespor
- 1996–97: Et Balık Spor Kulübü
- 1997–98: Antalya Büyükşehir Belediyespor
- 1998–99: Urla Belediyespor
- 1999–00: Migrosspor
- 2000–01: Alanya Belediyespor
- 2001–02: İstanbul Üniversitesi
- 2002–03: Küçükköy Belediyespor
- 2003–04: Kocaeli Basket
- 2004–05: Türk Hava Yolları Spor Kulübü
- 2005–06: Galatasaray
- 2006–07: Burhaniye Belediyespor
- 2007–08: Tarsus Belediyespor
- 2008–09: Kocaeli Büyükşehir Belediye Kağıtspor
- 2009–10: Alanya Belediyespor
- 2010–11: TED Ankara Kolejliler
- 2011–12: Edremit Belediyespor
- 2012–13: Altay Konak Belediyespor
- 2013–14: Edirnespor
- 2014–15: Basketbolu Geliştirenler Derneği
- 2015–16: Osmaniye Gençlik ve Spor Kulübü
- 2016–17: Ormanspor
- 2017–18: Bodrum Basketbol SK
- 2018–19: Çankaya Üniversitesi
- 2019–20: Cancelled due to the COVID-19 pandemic.
- 2020–21: Bursa Büyükşehir Belediyespor
- 2021–22: Emlak Konut SK
- 2022–23: Tarsus Belediyesispor
- 2023–24: Zonguldakspor Basket 67
- 2024–25: Edremit Belediyesi Gürespor
- 2025–26: Zorlu Koleji Samsun Basketbol

== See also ==
- Men's
  - Turkish Men's's Basketball League
  - Turkish Men's Basketball Cup
  - Turkish Men's Basketball Presidential Cup
- Women's
  - Women's Basketball Super League
  - Turkish Women's Basketball Cup
  - Turkish Women's Basketball Presidential Cup
