= BTV 1846 Wuppertal =

Barmer TV 1846 Wuppertal
- Founded: 1 October 1846
- Location: Wuppertal, Germany
- Team colors: Blue and white
- President: Ralf Schröder
- Championships: 1 EuroLeague Women (1996)
- Website: www.barmer-tv.de

Barmer TV 1846 Wuppertal (formerly Wuppertal Wings) іs a German women's basketball team from Wuppertal. The team won the EuroLeague Women in the 1995–96 season and multiple German championships.

== Titles ==
- EuroLeague Women (1): 1996
- Bundesliga (11): 1989, 1993–2002
- German Cup (12): 1989, 1992–2002
- Triple Crown (1): 1995–96

== History of club ==
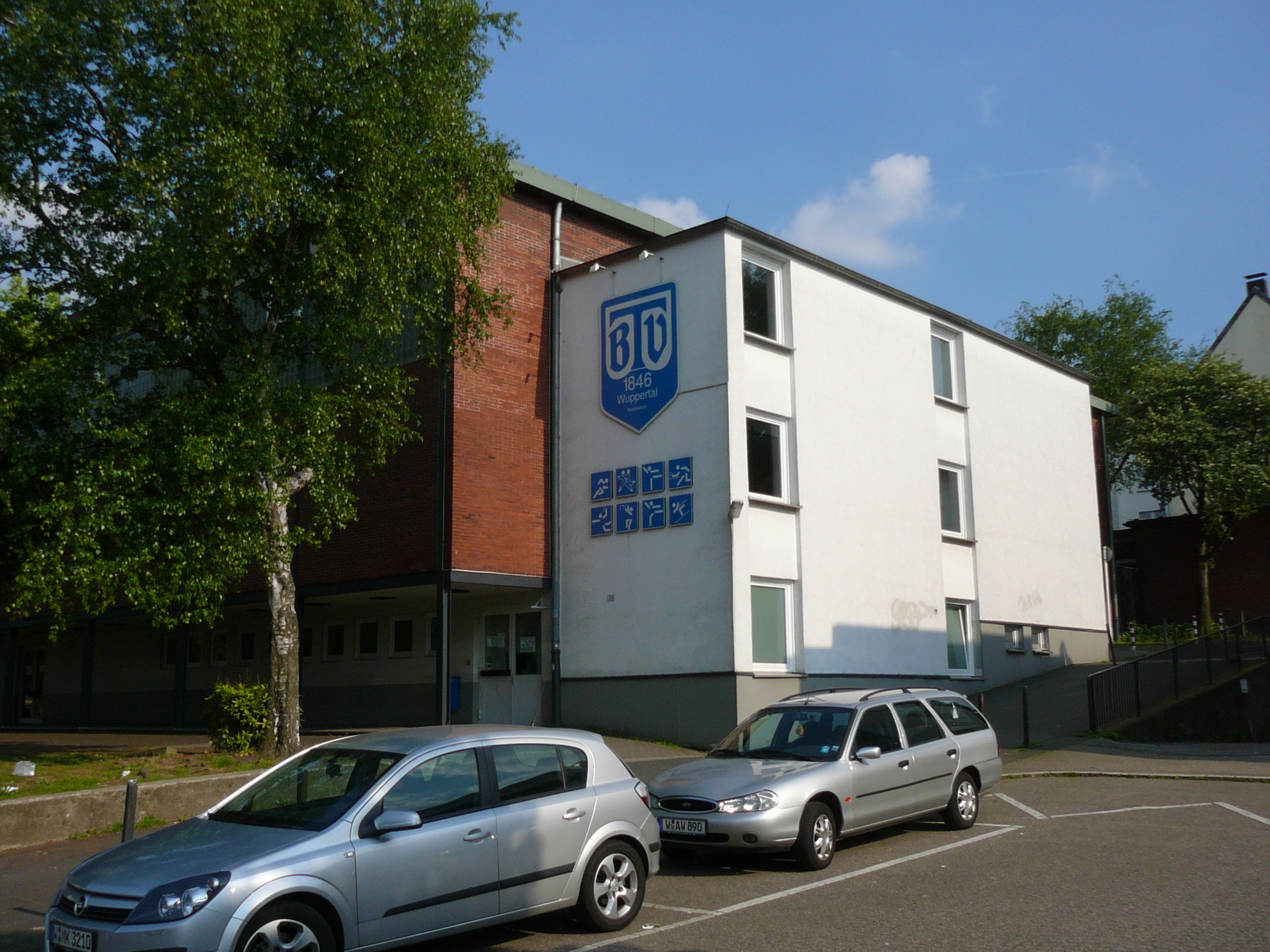

Barmer TV 1846 is a multi-sports club based in Wuppertal, Germany. Founded on 1 October 1846, it is the oldest sports club in the city. As of 2017, the club has around 1,600 members.

The club was founded by gymnasts in Wuppertal. The first chairman was Heinrich Colsmann. Initially focused on gymnastics and fencing, the club expanded in the early 20th century to include additional sports such as athletics and tennis.

By the late 20th century, Barmer TV had developed multiple departments including basketball, which became the most successful section.

=== Athletics ===
The athletics department achieved early national success in the 1930s. Werner Lueg later won a bronze medal in the 1500 metres at the 1952 Summer Olympics.

Christa Vahlensieck was among the world's leading marathon runners in the 1970s and set multiple world best times.

=== Women's basketball ===
The women's basketball team became one of the most successful in Germany, winning multiple national titles during the 1990s and early 2000s.

Internationally, the club won the EuroLeague Women title in 1996.

In 2000, the women's basketball section was separated from the main club. The team competed under the name Goldzack Wuppertal until 2002. After the withdrawal of the main sponsor, the team, known as the Wuppertal Wings, was dissolved.

== Notable members ==
- Marlies Askamp (born 1970), basketball player
- Martin Buß (born 1976), high jumper
- Andrea Harder (born 1977), basketball player
- Martina Kehrenberg (born 1966), basketball player
- Petra Kremer (born 1966), basketball player
- Roli-Ann Nikagbatse (born 1984), basketball player
- Christa Vahlensieck (born 1949), long-distance runner
- Wolfgang Killing (born 1953)
- Christina Hahn (born 1980)
