= 2024–25 EuroLeague Women qualification round =

EuroLeague Women qualification round
- Season: 2024–25
- Dates: 18–25 September 2024
- Games played: 6
- Teams: 6 (from 6 countries)

The 2024–25 EuroLeague Women qualification round decided the final three teams in the regular season.

== Format ==
Six teams were divided into three play offs, where the winners on aggregate advanced to the regular season.

== Teams ==
Location of teams of the 2024–25 EuroLeague Women qualification round.
Orange: Play Off 1; Green: Play Off 2; Deep Pink: Play Off 3.

Teams
(Czech Republic) Žabiny Brno
(France) Basket Landes
(Hungary) TARR KSC Szekszárd
(Romania) CSM Constanța
(Spain) Casademont Zaragoza
(Turkey) Beşiktaş

== Draw ==
The draw took place in Munich, Germany on the 18 July 2024. The bold text means which teams advanced.

Seeded	Unseeded
(France) **Basket Landes** (Spain) **Casademont Zaragoza** (Hungary) TARR KSC Szekszárd	(Turkey) Beşiktaş (Romania) CSM Constanța (Czech Republic) **Žabiny Brno**

== Matches ==
The three winners on aggregate advanced to the regular season.

Team 1	Agg.	Team 2	1st leg	2nd leg
**Žabiny Brno** (Czech Republic)	**147**–139	(Hungary) TARR KSC Szekszárd	67–66	80–73
CSM Constanța (Romania)	109–**146**	(Spain) **Casademont Zaragoza**	57–75	52–71
Beşiktaş (Turkey)	128–**164**	(France) **Basket Landes**	70–84	58–80

All times are local.

18 September 2024
18:00

Boxscore

**Žabiny Brno** (Czech Republic)	**67**–66	(Hungary) TARR KSC Szekszárd
Scoring by quarter: 15–**16**, 16–**18**, **17**–13, 19–19
Pts: Kostowicz 12; Rebs: Čechová 11; Asts: Kostowicz, Zaplatova 4		Pts: Whittle 22; Rebs: Westbeld 11; Asts: Horvath 4

Vodova Aréna, Brno
Attendance: 1,215
Referees: Valentin Oliot (FRA), Paulina Karolina Gajdosz (POL), Zdenko Tomasovic (SVK)

25 September 2024
18:00

Boxscore

TARR KSC Szekszárd (Hungary)	73–**80**	(Czech Republic) **Žabiny Brno**
Scoring by quarter: **23**–21, **22**–20, **18**–15, 10–**24**
Pts: Whittle 23; Rebs: Westbeld 7 Asts: Bejedi, Westbeld 3		Pts: Záplatová 27; Rebs: Hamzová, Cunane 9 Asts: Hamzová 5

Szekszárd Városi Sportcsarnok, Szekszárd
Attendance: 850
Referees: Özlem Yalman (TUR), Jelena Smiljanic (SRB), Alin Faur (ROU)

Žabiny Brno won 147–139 on aggregate

17 September 2024
19:00

Boxscore

CSM Constanța (Romania)	57–**75**	(Spain) **Casademont Zaragoza**
Scoring by quarter: 23–23, 13–13, 11–**21**, 10–**18**
Pts: Marginean 13; Rebs: Dedić 7 Asts: Marginean 14		Pts: Gatling 20; Rebs: Ortiz 11; Asts: Pueyo 16

Sala Sporturilor Constanta, Constanța
Attendance: 1,484
Referees: Stylianos Simeonidis (GRE), Cisil Güngör (TUR), Silvia Marziali (ITA)

25 September 2024
20:00

Boxscore

**Casademont Zaragoza** (Spain)	**71**–52	(Romania) CSM Constanța
Scoring by quarter: **20**–8, **16**–15, **20**–19, **15**–10
Pts: Pueyo 16; Rebs: Brčaninović 7 Asts: Ortiz 3		Pts: Dedić 20; Rebs: Dedić 10; Asts: Džombeta, Logic 4

Pabellón Príncipe Felipe, Zaragoza
Attendance: 4,161
Referees: Amal Dahra (FRA), Nikola Bejat (NOR), Martin van Hoye (BEL)

Casademont Zaragoza won 146–109 on aggregate

18 September 2024
20:00

Boxscore

Beşiktaş (Turkey)	70–**84**	(France) **Basket Landes**
Scoring by quarter: **17**–16, 11–**23**, 19–**21**, 23–**24**
Pts: Hillsman 38; Rebs: Bayram, Hillsman 8 Asts: Lazic, Winterburn 6		Pts: Macquet 15; Rebs: four players 6 Asts: Djekoundade, Slocum 4

Besiktas Akatlar Arena, Istanbul
Attendance: 600
Referees: Sonia Teixeira (POR), Zdravko Rutesic (MNE), Hrvoje Cavar (BIH)

25 September 2024
19:30

Boxscore

**Basket Landes** (France)	**80**–58	(Turkey) Beşiktaş
Scoring by quarter: **25**–15, 9–**15**, **25**–16, **21**–12
Pts: Djaldi-Tabdi 15; Rebs: Macquet 6 Asts: Slocum 18		Pts: Hillsman 16; Rebs: Hillsman, Bayram 7 Asts: Winterburn 5

Espace François Mitterrand, Mont-de-Marsan
Attendance: 2,600
Referees: Nemanja Ninkovic (SRB), Javier Torres Sánchez (ESP), Lukasz Jankowski (POL)

Basket Landes won 164–128 on aggregate

== See also ==
- 2024–25 EuroLeague Women
- 2024–25 EuroLeague Women regular season
- 2024–25 EuroCup Women
- 2024–25 EuroCup Women knockout stage
- 2024 FIBA Europe SuperCup Women
- 2024–25 EuroCup Women qualification round
