= 2024–25 EuroLeague Women =

EuroLeague Women
- Season: 2024–25
- Dates: Qualifying: 18–25 September 2024; Regular season: 9 October 2024 – 28 January 2025; Play Ins: 19–26 February 2025; Final Six: 9–13 April 2025
- Teams: Competition proper: 16; Total: 19 (from 9 countries)

Regular season
- Season MVP: (Belgium) Emma Meesseman (Fenerbahçe)

Finals
- Champions: (Czech Republic) ZVVZ USK Praha (2nd title)
- Runners-up: (Turkey) CBK Mersin
- Final Four MVP: (United States) Brionna Jones (ZVVZ USK Praha)

Statistical leaders
- Points: (United States) Natasha Howard (251 points)
- Rebounds: (Ivory Coast) Kariata Diaby (121 rebounds)
- Assists: (Belgium) Julie Allemand (88 assists)

Records
- Biggest home win: Fenerbahçe Opet 92–56 Valencia Basket (8 January 2025)
- Biggest away win: Olympiacos SFP 53–88 Tango Bourges Basket (17 October 2024)
- Highest scoring: ZVVZ USK Praha 100–85 Umana Reyer Venezia (27 November 2024)
- Highest attendance: 5,892; Casademont Zaragoza 64–79 Valencia Basket (22 January 2025)
- Lowest attendance: 50; Olympiacos SFP 64–77 Žabiny Brno (29 October 2023)

The 2024–25 EuroLeague Women was the 67th edition of the European women's club basketball championship organized by FIBA, and the 28th edition since being rebranded as the EuroLeague Women. Fenerbahçe Opet are the two-time defending champions, but failed to retain their title after they were defeated at the semifinals by ZVVZ USK Praha.

ZVVZ USK Praha won their second title after triumphing over CBK Mersin in the final. With legendary coach, Natália Hejková, winning the title before her retirement.

== Format ==
Starting this season, a new format will be introduced after FIBA Europe announced a change to the format on 10 May 2024. On 15 May 2024, the format was explained.

- Regular season (First round)

After the qualifiers, 16 teams will be split into 4 groups of four, where the top three from each group advances to the second round. The fourth place teams drop down to the EuroCup Women knockout stage. The advancing teams' records from the first round are carried over into the next round.

- Regular season (Second round)

The 12 remaining teams form 2 groups of six and will play the teams they have not played in the first round. In both groups, the top 2 will play the Semi-Final play-ins while 3rd and 4th play the Quarter-Final play-ins. The teams who finish fifth and sixth are eliminated.

- Play Ins

The play ins will decide who makes the final six and where each team will start in the final six. The top 2 play the Semi-Final play-ins and the third and fourth teams play the Quarter-Final play-ins. Both play ins are played in a home and away aggregate format. The higher-seeded teams play the second leg at home.

The winners of the Semi-Final play-ins will automatically progress to the semifinals of the final six, while the victors of the Quarter-Final play-ins will reach the quarterfinals of the final six. The losers of the Quarter-Final play-ins are eliminated.

- Final Six

The final six is held in a centralised venue and decide the champion. The losers of the Semi-Final play-ins plus the winners of the Quarter-Final play-ins contest the quarterfinals. The two winners move on to the semifinals to play the teams who automatically qualify for this round. Whoever triumphs in the semifinals reach the final while the losers play the third place match.

== Rankings ==
The results were based on the results of the past three seasons.

- Associations 1–4 can have three teams qualify.
- Associations 5–8 each have two teams qualify.
- Associations 9–10 each have one team qualify directly into the regular season.
- Associations below the top 10 can have one team qualify for the qualification round.

If a club who qualified for the regular season doesn't take the place, it will be given to another club who entered.

Rank	Association	Average points	Teams
1	Turkey	250.00	3
2	France	170.67	3
3	Spain	164.67	3
4	Hungary	113.33	3
5	Italy	103.33	2
6	Czech Republic	82.67	2
7	Poland	56.00	1
8	Russia	42.00	0
9	Belgium	28.67	0
10	Greece	21.67	1
11	(United Kingdom) Great Britain	21.33	0
12	Latvia	20.00	0
12	Israel	20.00	0
14	Romania	14.67	1

Rank	Association	Average points	Teams
15	Slovakia	12.00	0
16	Portugal	8.00	0
16	Switzerland	8.00	0
18	Luxembourg	6.00	0
19	Serbia	5.33	0
20	Ukraine	5.00	0
21	Germany	4.67	0
21	Lithuania	4.67	0
23	Croatia	3.33	0
24	Belarus	2.00	0
25	Bulgaria	1.33	0
25	Iceland	1.33	0
27	Norway	0.67	0
27	Sweden	0.67	0

== Teams ==
The teams were announced on 5 July 2024. League positions of the previous season shown in parentheses (TH EL: EuroLeague Women title holders). Also, S means that the team in the qualifying round was seeded.

Regular season
(Czech Republic) ZVVZ USK Praha (1st)	(Italy) Beretta Famila Schio (2nd)
(France) ESB Villeneuve-d'Ascq (1st)	(Poland) KGHM BC Polkowice (1st)
(France) Tango Bourges Basket (CW, 5th)	(Spain) Valencia Basket (1st)
(Greece) Olympiacos SFP (1st)	(Spain) Perfumerías Avenida (2nd)
(Hungary) DVTK HUN-Therm (1st)	(Turkey) Fenerbahçe Opet^{TH EL} (1st)
(Hungary) Uni Győr (2nd)	(Turkey) CBK Mersin (2nd)
(Italy) Umana Reyer Venezia (1st)
Qualifying round
(Czech Republic) Žabiny Brno (2nd)	(Romania) CSM Constanța (1st)
(France) Basket Landes ^{S} (2nd)	(Spain) Casademont Zaragoza ^{S} (3rd)
(Hungary) TARR KSC Szekszárd ^{S} (3rd)	(Turkey) Beşiktaş (3rd)

== Round and draw dates ==
=== Schedule ===
Phase	Round	Round date
Qualification round	First Leg	17–18 September 2024
Qualification round	Second Leg	24–25 September 2024
Regular season (First Round)	Matchday 1	9–10 October 2024
Regular season (First Round)	Matchday 2	16–17 October 2024
Regular season (First Round)	Matchday 3	23–24 October 2024
Regular season (First Round)	Matchday 4	29–30 October 2024
Regular season (First Round)	Matchday 5	20–21 November 2024
Regular season (First Round)	Matchday 6	27 November 2024
Regular season (Second Round)	Matchday 7	11 December 2024
Regular season (Second Round)	Matchday 8	18 December 2024
Regular season (Second Round)	Matchday 9	8 January 2025
Regular season (Second Round)	Matchday 10	15 January 2025
Regular season (Second Round)	Matchday 11	22 January 2025
Regular season (Second Round)	Matchday 12	28 January 2025
Play Ins	First Leg	19 February 2025
Play Ins	Second Leg	26 February 2025
Final Six	Quarterfinals	9 April 2025
Final Six	Semifinals	11 April 2025
Final Six	Final	13 April 2025

=== Draw ===
The seeding was announced on 15 July 2024. The draw took place in Munich, Germany on the 18 July 2024. Only a maximum of one club from the same country can be in the same regular season group.

Seed 1	Seed 2	Seed 3	Seed 4
(Turkey) Fenerbahçe (Czech Republic) ZVVZ USK Praha (Turkey) CBK Mersin (Spain) Perfumerias Avenida	(Italy) Beretta Famila Schio (France) ESB Villeneuve-d'Ascq (France) Tango Bourges Basket (Spain) Valencia Basket	(Italy) Umana Reyer Venezia (Hungary) DVTK HUN-Therm (Poland) KGHM BC Polkowice (Greece) Olympiacos SFP	(Hungary) Uni Győr (N/A) Qualifier 1 (Note: The eventual team in this slot was Žabiny Brno.) (N/A) Qualifier 2 (Note: The eventual team in this slot was Casademont Zaragoza.) (N/A) Qualifier 3 (Note: The eventual team in this slot was Basket Landes.)

== Qualification round ==
The winners advance to the regular season, while the losers drop down to the EuroCup regular season.

Team 1	Agg.	Team 2	1st leg	2nd leg
Žabiny Brno (Czech Republic)	147–139	(Hungary) TARR KSC Szekszárd	67–66	80–73
CSM Constanța (Romania)	109–146	(Spain) Casademont Zaragoza	57–75	52–71
Beşiktaş (Turkey)	128–164	(France) Basket Landes	70–84	58–80

== Regular season ==
Location of teams of the 2024–25 Euroleague Women regular season.
Red: Group A; Green: Group B; Yellow: Group C; Blue: Group D.

If teams are level on record at the end of the regular season, tiebreakers are applied in the following order:

1. Head-to-head record
2. Head-to-head point differential
3. Head-to-head points scored
4. Point differential for the entire regular season
5. Points scored for the entire regular season

Overall, eight countries are present in the regular season, with the only difference being Greece taking the of Romania. For the first time since 2014–15, Czech Republic will have two teams in the regular season.

=== First round ===
==== Group A ====
Pos	Team	Pld	W	L	PF	PA	PD	Pts	Qualification	LAN	SCH	AVE	DVTK
1	(France) Basket Landes	6	4	2	360	372	−12	10 (Note: Basket Landes 128–123 Beretta Familia Schio)	Second round	—	68–59	59–58	55–54
2	(Italy) Beretta Famila Schio	6	4	2	428	382	+46	10	Second round	64–60	—	92–58	71–57
3	(Spain) Perfumerias Avenida	6	3	3	401	401	0	9	Second round	81–52	69–79	—	67–55
4	(Hungary) DVTK HUN-Therm	6	1	5	356	390	−34	7	EuroCup Women	56–66	70–63	64–68	—

Source: FIBA
Legend: Blue = home team win; Red = away team win.
Rules for classification: 1) Points; 2) Points difference; 3) Points scored.

==== Group B ====
Pos	Team	Pld	W	L	PF	PA	PD	Pts	Qualification	MER	TAN	ZAB	OLY
1	(Turkey) CBK Mersin	6	6	0	477	386	+91	12	Second round	—	80–76	88–74	87–58
2	(France) Tango Bourges Basket	6	4	2	488	407	+81	10	Second round	66–77	—	91–70	82–62
3	(Czech Republic) Žabiny Brno	6	2	4	423	453	−30	8	Second round	45–64	65–85	—	92–61
4	(Greece) Olympiacos SFP	6	0	6	365	507	−142	6	EuroCup Women	67–81	53–88	64–77	—

Source: FIBA
Legend: Blue = home team win; Red = away team win.
Rules for classification: 1) Points; 2) Points difference; 3) Points scored.

==== Group C ====
Pos	Team	Pld	W	L	PF	PA	PD	Pts	Qualification	FEN	CAS	POL	VIL
1	(Turkey) Fenerbahçe Opet	6	6	0	520	409	+111	12	Second round	—	84–64	90–61	95–75
2	(Spain) Casademont Zaragoza	6	4	2	418	412	+6	10	Second round	69–80	—	76–73	68–59
3	(Poland) KGHM BC Polkowice	6	1	5	458	491	−33	7 (Note: KGHM BC Polkowice 173–163 ESB Villeneuve-d'Ascq)	Second round	88–90	63–72	—	90–63
4	(France) ESB Villeneuve-d'Ascq	6	1	5	402	486	−84	7	EuroCup Women	52–81	53–69	100–83	—

Source: FIBA
Legend: Blue = home team win; Red = away team win.
Rules for classification: 1) Points; 2) Points difference; 3) Points scored.

==== Group D ====
Pos	Team	Pld	W	L	PF	PA	PD	Pts	Qualification	VAL	PRA	REY	GYO
1	(Spain) Valencia Basket	6	5	1	457	406	+51	11	Second round	—	82–60	83–72	74–59
2	(Czech Republic) ZVVZ USK Praha	6	4	2	475	442	+33	10	Second round	64–67	—	100–85	82–62
3	(Italy) Umana Reyer Venezia	6	3	3	460	463	−3	9	Second round	75–67	66–86	—	82–68
4	(Hungary) Uni Győr	6	0	6	404	485	−81	6	EuroCup Women	74–86	76–81	59–80	—

Source: FIBA
Legend: Blue = home team win; Red = away team win.
Rules for classification: 1) Points; 2) Points difference; 3) Points scored.

=== Second round ===
==== Group E ====
Pos	Team	Pld	W	L	PF	PA	PD	Pts	Qualification	MER	SCH	TAN	LAN	AVE	ZAB
1	(Turkey) CBK Mersin	12	11	1	935	776	+159	23	Semifinal play in	—	86–52	80–76	74–67	79–62	88–74
2	(Italy) Beretta Famila Schio	12	9	3	872	812	+60	21	Semifinal play in	83–71	—	67–62	64–60	92–58	76–68
3	(France) Tango Bourges Basket	12	7	5	912	813	+99	19	Quarterfinal play in	66–77	72–84	—	75–61	80–67	91–70
4	(France) Basket Landes	12	6	6	758	796	−38	18	Quarterfinal play in	53–73	68–59	76–73	—	59–58	76–60
5	(Spain) Perfumerias Avenida	12	5	7	783	818	−35	17		73–75	69–79	51–62	81–52	—	64–58
6	(Czech Republic) Žabiny Brno	12	3	9	812	881	−69	15		45–64	71–82	65–85	69–65	63–65	—

Source: FIBA
Legend: Blue = home team win; Red = away team win.
Rules for classification: 1) Points; 2) Points difference; 3) Points scored.

==== Group F ====
Pos	Team	Pld	W	L	PF	PA	PD	Pts	Qualification	FEN	VAL	PRA	CAS	REY	POL
1	(Turkey) Fenerbahçe Opet	10	10	0	823	649	+174	20	Semifinal play in	—	92–56	75–71	84–64	86–66	~~90–61~~
2	(Spain) Valencia Basket	10	7	3	753	732	+21	17	Semifinal play in	71–88	—	82–60	90–82	83–72	~~15 Jan~~
3	(Czech Republic) ZVVZ USK Praha	10	5	5	740	719	+21	15 (Note: ZVVZ USK Praha 140–139 Casademont Zaragoza)	Quarterfinal play in	54–63	64–67	—	72–66	100–85	~~82–45~~
4	(Spain) Casademont Zaragoza	10	5	5	663	680	−17	15	Quarterfinal play in	69–80	64–79	73–68	—	64–56	~~76–73~~
5	(Italy) Umana Reyer Venezia	10	3	7	692	736	−44	13		71–79	75–67	66–86	39–44	—	~~28 Jan~~
6	(Poland) KGHM BC Polkowice (Note: On 4 January 2025, KGHM BC Polkowice withdrew from the competition due to financial reasons. All games involving KGHM BC Polkowice will be annulled and not count for the rankings.)	8	1	7	559	639	−80	9	Withdrew	~~88–90~~	~~56–66~~	~~22 Jan~~	~~63–72~~	~~8 Jan~~	—

Source: FIBA
Legend: Blue = home team win; Red = away team win.
Rules for classification: 1) Points; 2) Points difference; 3) Points scored.

== Play ins ==
Semifinal play ins

Semifinal play in
(Spain) Valencia Basket	89	77	166
(Turkey) CBK Mersin	57	92	149

19 February 2025
19:15

Report

Valencia Basket (Spain)	89–57	(Turkey) CBK Mersin
Scoring by quarter: 25–15, 13–20, 27–7, 24–15
Pts: Iagupova 18; Rebs: Alexander 10; Asts: Romero, Vītola 4		Pts: Fauthoux 23; Rebs: Howard, Anderson 5 Asts: Anderson, Johannès 2

Pavelló Municipal Font de Sant Lluís, Valencia
Attendance: 3,110
Referees: Ciprian Stoica (ROU), Veronika Obertová (SVK), Valerio Grigioni (ITA)

26 February 2025
19:30

Report

CBK Mersin (Turkey)	92–77	(Spain) Valencia Basket
Scoring by quarter: 21–15, 20–19, 25–26, 26–17
Pts: Johannès 21; Rebs: Howard 10; Asts: Fauthoux 8		Pts: Fiebich 16; Rebs: Alexander 13; Asts: Turner 6

Servet Tazegül Spor Salonu, Mersin
Attendance: 3,000
Referees: Viola Györgyi (NOR), Silvia Marziali (ITA), Kirile Tvauri (GEO)

Valencia Basket won 166–149 on aggregate

Semifinal play in
(Italy) Beretta Familia Schio	80	60	140
(Turkey) Fenerbahçe Opet	86	64	150

19 February 2025
19:15

Report

Beretta Familia Schio (Italy)	80–86	(Turkey) Fenerbahçe Opet
Scoring by quarter: 17–24, 13–20, 19–14, 31–28
Pts: Sottana 24; Rebs: Juhász 7 Asts: Verona, Dojkić 5		Pts: Meesseman 29; Rebs: Meesseman 7 Asts: Uzun 7

Palazzetto Livio Romare, Schio
Attendance: 2,400
Referees: Branimir Galić (CRO), Ewa Matuszewska (POL), Alin Faur (ROU)

26 February 2025
19:00

Report

Fenerbahçe Opet (Turkey)	64–60	(Italy) Beretta Familia Schio
Scoring by quarter: 24–17, 18–9, 8–14, 14–20
Pts: Meesseman 19; Rebs: Meesseman 10; Asts: Allemand 7		Pts: Laksa 25; Rebs: Juhász 10; Asts: Verona 6

Metro Enerji Sports Hall, Istanbul
Attendance: 980
Referees: Paulina Karolina Gajdosz (POL), Josip Jurcevic (CRO), Blaž Zupančič (SLO)

Fenerbahçe Opet won 150–140 on aggregate

Quarterfinal play ins

Quarterfinal play in
(Spain) Casademont Zaragoza	55	73	128
(France) Tango Bourges Basket	75	64	139

19 February 2025
20:00

Report

Casademont Zaragoza (Spain)	55–75	(France) Tango Bourges Basket
Scoring by quarter: 14–15, 13–15, 13–24, 15–21
Pts: Pueyo 13; Rebs: Hermosa 6 Asts: three players 2		Pts: Pouye 17; Rebs: Spanou 11; Asts: Green 4

Pabellón Príncipe Felipe, Zaragoza
Attendance: 4,053
Referees: Lukasz Jankowski (POL), Silvia Marziali (ITA), Jan Baloun (CZE)

26 February 2025
20:00

Report

Tango Bourges Basket (France)	64–73	(Spain) Casademont Zaragoza
Scoring by quarter: 19–23, 21–14, 12–15, 12–21
Pts: Okonkwo 17; Rebs: Diaby 8 Asts: Guapo 6		Pts: Mané 15; Rebs: Evans 10; Asts: Ortiz 7

Palais des sports du Prado, Bourges
Attendance: 4,040
Referees: Jelena Tomic (CRO), Mihkel Männiste (EST), Ritvars Helmsteins (LAT)

Tango Bourges Basket won 139–128 on aggregate

Quarterfinal play in
(France) Basket Landes	68	43	111
(Czech Republic) ZVVZ USK Praha	72	69	141

19 February 2025
19:30

Report

Basket Landes (France)	68–72	(Czech Republic) ZVVZ USK Praha
Scoring by quarter: 26–20, 15–15, 10–18, 17–19
Pts: Geiselsöder 13; Rebs: three players 5 Asts: Lacan 4		Pts: Jones 31; Rebs: Jones 16; Asts: Cazorla 12

Espace François Mitterrand, Mont-de-Marsan
Attendance: 2,600
Referees: Zdravko Rutesic (MNE), Paulina Karolina Gajdosz (POL), Nikola Bejat (NOR)

26 February 2025
19:00

Report

ZVVZ USK Praha (Czech Republic)	69–43	(France) Basket Landes
Scoring by quarter: 12–6, 15–16, 21–10, 21–11
Pts: Jones 21; Rebs: Magbegor 11; Asts: Oblak 7		Pts: Geiselsöder 10; Rebs: Geiselsöder 9 Asts: Ewodo 3

Královka Arena, Prague
Attendance: 1,289
Referees: Yasmina Alcaraz (ESP), Petar Pesic (SRB), Juozas Barkauskas (LTU)

ZVVZ USK Praha won 141–111 on aggregate

== Final six ==
On 2 December 2024, the Pabellón Príncipe Felipe in Zaragoza was announced as the host of the final six for the next three years.

=== Bracket ===
Quarterfinals
9 April
(Turkey) CBK Mersin	66
(France) Tango Bourges Basket	59
9 April
(Italy) Beretta Familia Schio	72
(Czech Republic) ZVVZ USK Praha	79

Semifinals
11 April
(Spain) Valencia Basket	66
(Turkey) CBK Mersin	68
11 April
(Turkey) Fenerbahçe Opet	71
(Czech Republic) ZVVZ USK Praha	91

Final
13 April
(Turkey) CBK Mersin	53
(Czech Republic) ZVVZ USK Praha	66
Third place
13 April
(Spain) Valencia Basket	49
(Turkey) Fenerbahçe Opet	59

=== Third place match ===
13 April 2025
17:00

Report

Fenerbahçe Opet (Turkey)	59–49	(Spain) Valencia Basket
Scoring by quarter: 8–12, 21–13, 13–18, 7–16
Pts: Meesseman 16; Rebs: Meesseman 10; Asts: Williams 7		Pts: Fiebich 15; Rebs: Turner, Mavunga 8 Asts: three players 3

Pabellón Príncipe Felipe, Zaragoza
Attendance: 3,217
Referees: Ventsislav Velikov (BUL), Veronika Obertová (SVK), Péter Praksch (HUN)

=== Final ===
13 April 2025
20:00

Report

CBK Mersin (Turkey)	53–66	(Czech Republic) ZVVZ USK Praha
Scoring by quarter: 17–24, 12–18, 13–7, 11–17
Pts: Howard 19; Rebs: Howard, Rupert 7 Asts: Anderson 4		Pts: Jones 24; Rebs: Jones 11; Asts: Oblak 5

Pabellón Príncipe Felipe, Zaragoza
Attendance: 4,287
Referees: Ariadna Chueca (ESP), Paulina Karolina Gajdosz (POL), Mihkel Männiste (EST)

2024–25 EuroLeague Women Champions

ZVVZ USK Praha
Second title

== Awards ==
=== EuroLeague MVP ===
Player	Team	Ref.
(Belgium) Emma Meesseman	(Turkey) Fenerbahçe	

=== EuroLeague Final Six MVP ===
Player	Team	Ref.
(United States) Brionna Jones	(Czech Republic) ZVVZ USK Praha	

=== EuroLeague All-Star Five ===
All-Star Five
(France) Gabby Williams
(France) Valériane Ayayi
(Australia) Ezi Magbegor
(United States) Natasha Howard
(United States) Brionna Jones

=== All-EuroLeague Teams ===
First Team	Second Team	Third Team
(Ukraine) Alina Iagupova	(Belgium) Julie Allemand	(France) Pauline Astier
(Spain) María Conde	(Serbia) Yvonne Anderson	(Spain) Mariona Ortiz
(France) Gabby Williams	(Hungary) Dorka Juhász	(France) Valériane Ayayi
(Belgium) Emma Meesseman	(United States) Brionna Jones	(France) Janelle Salaün
(France) Iliana Rupert	(United States) Natasha Howard	(Nigeria) Amy Okonkwo

=== Defensive Player of the Year ===
Player	Team	Ref.
(France) Gabby Williams	(Turkey) Fenerbahçe	

=== Young Player of the Year ===
Player	Team	Ref.
(Spain) Iyana Martín	(Spain) Perfumerias Avenida	

=== Coach of the Year ===
Player	Team	Ref.
(Spain) Ruben Burgos	(Spain) Valencia Basket	

=== Best Play of the Season ===
Player	Team	Ref.
(Ukraine) Alina Iagupova	(Spain) Valencia Basket	

=== Club Excellence Award ===
Team	Ref.
(France) Basket Landes	

=== MVP of the Month ===
Month	Player	Team	Ref.
October	(Belgium) Emma Meesseman	(Turkey) Fenerbahçe	
November	(Spain) María Conde	(Czech Republic) ZVVZ USK Praha	
December	(France) Gabby Williams	(Turkey) Fenerbahçe	
January	(Hungary) Dorka Juhász	(Italy) Beretta Familia Schio	
February	(Belgium) Emma Meesseman	(Turkey) Fenerbahçe	

=== Team of the Month ===
Round	PG	SG	SF	PF	C	Ref.
October	(France) Gabby Williams ( (Turkey) Fenerbahçe Opet)	(Spain) María Conde ( (Czech Republic) ZVVZ USK Praha)	(France) Janelle Salaün ( (Italy) Beretta Familia Schio)	(Belgium) Emma Meesseman ( (Turkey) Fenerbahçe Opet)	(United States) Natasha Howard ( (Turkey) CBK Mersin)	
November	(Spain) Queralt Casas ( (Spain) Valencia Basket)	(Spain) Helena Pueyo ( (Spain) Casademont Zaragoza)	(Spain) María Conde ( (Czech Republic) ZVVZ USK Praha)	(Belgium) Emma Meesseman ( (Turkey) Fenerbahçe Opet)	(United States) Brionna Jones ( (Czech Republic) ZVVZ USK Praha)	
December	(Serbia) Yvonne Anderson ( (Turkey) CBK Mersin)	(France) Gabby Williams ( (Turkey) Fenerbahçe Opet)	(France) Valériane Ayayi ( (Czech Republic) ZVVZ USK Praha)	(Poland) Stephanie Mavunga ( (Spain) Valencia Basket)	(France) Iliana Rupert ( (Turkey) CBK Mersin)	
January	(Belgium) Julie Allemand ( (Turkey) Fenerbahçe Opet)	(France) Gabby Williams ( (Turkey) Fenerbahçe Opet)	(Hungary) Dorka Juhász ( (Italy) Beretta Familia Schio)	(Belgium) Emma Meesseman ( (Turkey) Fenerbahçe Opet)	(France) Iliana Rupert ( (Turkey) CBK Mersin)	
February	(France) Marine Fauthoux ( (Turkey) CBK Mersin)	(France) Gabby Williams ( (Turkey) Fenerbahçe Opet)	(Canada) Kayla Alexander ( (Spain) Valencia Basket)	(Belgium) Emma Meesseman ( (Turkey) Fenerbahçe Opet)	(United States) Brionna Jones ( (Czech Republic) ZVVZ USK Praha)	

=== MVP of the Round ===
First round

Round	PG	SG	SF	PF	C	Ref.
1	(France) Marine Fauthoux ( (Turkey) CBK Mersin)	(Czech Republic) Eliška Hamzová ( (Czech Republic) Žabiny Brno)	(France) Janelle Salaün ( (Italy) Beretta Famila Schio)	(Belgium) Emma Meesseman ( (Turkey) Fenerbahçe Opet)	(Italy) Lorela Cubaj ( (Italy) Umana Reyer Venezia)	
2	(Czech Republic) Eliška Hamzová ( (Czech Republic) Žabiny Brno)	(Spain) María Conde ( (Czech Republic) ZVVZ USK Praha)	(Mali) Sika Koné ( (Spain) Perfumerías Avenida)	(United States) Emma Cannon ( (Poland) KGHM BC Polkowice)	(Belgium) Emma Meesseman ( (Turkey) Fenerbahçe Opet)	
3	(Germany) Alexis Peterson ( (Poland) KGHM BC Polkowice)	(Spain) María Conde ( (Czech Republic) ZVVZ USK Praha)	(Ivory Coast) Kariata Diaby ( (France) Tango Bourges Basket)	(United States) Natasha Howard ( (Turkey) CBK Mersin)	(United States) Emma Cannon ( (Poland) KGHM BC Polkowice)	
4	(France) Pauline Astier ( (France) Tango Bourges Basket)	(Latvia) Kitija Laksa ( (Italy) Beretta Famila Schio)	(United States) Natasha Howard ( (Turkey) CBK Mersin)	(Belgium) Emma Meesseman ( (Turkey) Fenerbahçe Opet)	(Latvia) Anete Šteinberga ( (Poland) KGHM BC Polkowice)	
5	(France) Carla Leite ( (France) ESB Villeneuve-d'Ascq)	(Spain) Leticia Romero ( (Spain) Valencia Basket)	(France) Valériane Ayayi ( (Czech Republic) ZVVZ USK Praha)	(United States) Kelsey Bone ( (France) ESB Villeneuve-d'Ascq)	(United States) Brionna Jones ( (Czech Republic) ZVVZ USK Praha)	
6	(Spain) Maite Cazorla ( (Czech Republic) ZVVZ USK Praha)	(Spain) María Conde ( (Czech Republic) ZVVZ USK Praha)	(Serbia) Dragana Stanković ( (Italy) Umana Reyer Venezia)	(Spain) María Araújo ( (Turkey) CBK Mersin)	(Belgium) Emma Meesseman ( (Turkey) Fenerbahçe Opet)	

Second round

Round	PG	SG	SF	PF	C	Ref.
7	(Serbia) Yvonne Anderson ( (Turkey) CBK Mersin)	(United States) Yvonne Turner ( (Spain) Valencia Basket)	(United States) Stephanie Kostowicz ( (Czech Republic) Žabiny Brno)	(United States) Emma Cannon ( (Poland) KGHM BC Polkowice)	(United States) Brionna Jones ( (Czech Republic) ZVVZ USK Praha)	
8	(Spain) María Conde ( (Czech Republic) ZVVZ USK Praha)	(France) Gabby Williams ( (Turkey) Fenerbahçe Opet)	(Nigeria) Amy Okonkwo ( (France) Tango Bourges Basket)	(United States) Natasha Howard ( (Turkey) CBK Mersin)	(France) Iliana Rupert ( (Turkey) CBK Mersin)	
9	(Serbia) Yvonne Anderson ( (Turkey) CBK Mersin)	(France) Gabby Williams ( (Turkey) Fenerbahçe Opet)	(Nigeria) Amy Okonkwo ( (France) Tango Bourges Basket)	(United States) Natasha Howard ( (Turkey) CBK Mersin)	(Hungary) Dorka Juhász ( (Italy) Beretta Famila Schio)	
10	(Serbia) Yvonne Anderson ( (Turkey) CBK Mersin)	(Czech Republic) Eliška Hamzová ( (Czech Republic) Žabiny Brno)	(United States) Stephanie Kostowicz ( (Czech Republic) Žabiny Brno)	(France) Iliana Rupert ( (Turkey) CBK Mersin)	(Hungary) Dorka Juhász ( (Italy) Beretta Famila Schio)	
11	(Spain) Leticia Romero ( (Spain) Valencia Basket)	(Latvia) Kitija Laksa ( (Italy) Beretta Famila Schio)	(Nigeria) Amy Okonkwo ( (France) Tango Bourges Basket)	(Belgium) Emma Meesseman ( (Turkey) Fenerbahçe Opet)	(Hungary) Dorka Juhász ( (Italy) Beretta Famila Schio)	
12	(Belgium) Julie Allemand ( (Turkey) Fenerbahçe Opet)	(Canada) Bridget Carleton ( (Turkey) CBK Mersin)	(France) Valériane Ayayi ( (Czech Republic) ZVVZ USK Praha)	(Belgium) Emma Meesseman ( (Turkey) Fenerbahçe Opet)	(Hungary) Dorka Juhász ( (Italy) Beretta Famila Schio)	

Play Ins

Round	PG	SG	SF	PF	C
First Leg	(Turkey) Sevgi Uzun ( (Turkey) Fenerbahçe Opet)	(Ukraine) Alina Iagupova ( (Spain) Valencia Basket)	(France) Gabby Williams ( (Turkey) Fenerbahçe Opet)	(Belgium) Emma Meesseman ( (Turkey) Fenerbahçe Opet)	(United States) Brionna Jones ( (Czech Republic) ZVVZ USK Praha)
Second Leg	(Latvia) Kitija Laksa ( (Italy) Beretta Famila Schio)	(Canada) Bridget Carleton ( (Turkey) CBK Mersin)	(Nigeria) Amy Okonkwo ( (France) Tango Bourges Basket)	(Belgium) Emma Meesseman ( (Turkey) Fenerbahçe Opet)	(Australia) Ezi Magbegor ( (Czech Republic) ZVVZ USK Praha)

Final Six

Round	PG	SG	SF	PF	C
Quarterfinals	(United Kingdom) Karlie Samuelson ( (Turkey) CBK Mersin)	(United States) Brionna Jones ( (Czech Republic) ZVVZ USK Praha)	(France) Valériane Ayayi ( (Czech Republic) ZVVZ USK Praha)	(Serbia) Yvonne Anderson ( (Turkey) CBK Mersin)	(France) Pauline Astier ( (France) Tango Bourges Basket)
Semifinals	(Belgium) Julie Allemand ( (Turkey) Fenerbahçe Opet)	(France) Marine Fauthoux ( (Turkey) CBK Mersin)	(Canada) Kayla Alexander ( (Spain) Valencia Basket)	(Australia) Ezi Magbegor ( (Czech Republic) ZVVZ USK Praha)	(United States) Brionna Jones ( (Czech Republic) ZVVZ USK Praha)

== Statistics ==
=== Individual statistics ===
==== Efficiency ====
Rank	Name	Team	Games	Efficiency	PIR
1.	(Belgium) Emma Meesseman	(Turkey) Fenerbahçe Opet	14	322	23.0
2.	(United States) Brionna Jones	(Czech Republic) ZVVZ USK Praha	13	291	22.4
3.	(France) Gabby Williams	(Turkey) Fenerbahçe Opet	14	269	19.2
3.	(France) Iliana Rupert	(Turkey) CBK Mersin	13	249	19.2
5.	(United States) Natasha Howard	(Turkey) CBK Mersin	15	268	17.9

==== Points ====
Rank	Name	Team	Games	Points	PPG
1.	(United States) Brionna Jones	(Czech Republic) ZVVZ USK Praha	13	233	17.9
2.	(Belgium) Emma Meesseman	(Turkey) Fenerbahçe Opet	14	237	16.9
3.	(Finland) Awak Kuier	(Italy) Umana Reyer Venezia	10	168	16.8
4.	(United States) Natasha Howard	(Turkey) CBK Mersin	15	251	16.7
5.	(Latvia) Kitija Laksa	(Italy) Beretta Famila Schio	15	232	15.5

==== Rebounds ====
Rank	Name	Team	Games	Rebounds	RPG
1.	(United States) Brionna Jones	(Czech Republic) ZVVZ USK Praha	13	118	9.1
2.	(Hungary) Dorka Juhász	(Italy) Beretta Famila Schio	10	84	8.4
3.	(Ivory Coast) Kariata Diaby	(France) Tango Bourges Basket	15	121	8.1
4.	(United States) Elissa Cunane	(Czech Republic) Žabiny Brno	14	107	7.6
4.	(Canada) Kayla Alexander	(Spain) Valencia Basket	10	76	7.6

==== Assists ====
Rank	Name	Team	Games	Assists	APG
1.	(Spain) María Conde	(Czech Republic) ZVVZ USK Praha	8	51	6.4
2.	(Belgium) Julie Allemand	(Turkey) Fenerbahçe Opet	14	88	6.3
3.	(Spain) Mariona Ortiz	(Spain) Casademont Zaragoza	14	76	5.4
3.	(France) Pauline Astier	(France) Tango Bourges Basket	15	81	5.4
5.	(Serbia) Yvonne Anderson	(Turkey) CBK Mersin	16	80	5.0

==== Steals ====
Rank	Name	Team	Games	Steals	SPG
1.	(France) Gabby Williams	(Turkey) Fenerbahçe Opet	14	39	2.8
2.	(Belgium) Julie Allemand	(Turkey) Fenerbahçe Opet	14	33	2.4
3.	(Spain) Mariona Ortiz	(Spain) Casademont Zaragoza	14	31	2.2
4.	(Spain) Helena Pueyo	(Spain) Casademont Zaragoza	14	28	2.0
4.	(France) Valériane Ayayi	(Czech Republic) ZVVZ USK Praha	15	30	2.0
4.	(France) Pauline Astier	(France) Tango Bourges Basket	15	30	2.0

==== Blocks ====
Rank	Name	Team	Games	Blocks	BPG
1.	(France) Iliana Rupert	(Turkey) CBK Mersin	13	21	1.6
2.	(Finland) Awak Kuier	(Italy) Umana Reyer Venezia	10	12	1.2
3.	(Czech Republic) Emma Čechová	(Czech Republic) Žabiny Brno	14	16	1.1
4.	(France) Myriam Djekoundade	(France) Basket Landes	15	13	0.9
5.	(United States) Natasha Howard	(Turkey) CBK Mersin	15	12	0.8
5.	(Serbia) Dragana Stanković	(Italy) Umana Reyer Venezia	10	8	0.8

==== Other statistics ====
Category	Player	Team	Games	Average
Turnovers	(Spain) Mariona Ortiz	(Spain) Casademont Zaragoza	14	3.9
FT %	(Nigeria) Amy Okonkwo	(France) Tango Bourges Basket	15	91.8%
2-Point %	(Germany) Luisa Geiselsöder	(France) Basket Landes	14	61.1%
3-Point %	(Italy) Jasmine Keys	(Italy) Beretta Famila Schio	15	52.8%

=== Individual game highs ===
Category	Player	Team	Statistic	Opponent
Efficiency	(United States) Natasha Howard	(Turkey) CBK Mersin	45	(France) Tango Bourges Basket (29 October 2024)
Points	(Bulgaria) Khaalia Hillsman	(Turkey) Beşiktaş Boa	38	(France) Basket Landes (18 September 2024)
Rebounds	(Hungary) Dorka Juhász	(Italy) Beretta Famila Schio	17	(Turkey) CBK Mersin (22 January 2025)
Assists	(Italy) Costanza Verona	(Italy) Beretta Famila Schio	12	(Czech Republic) ZVVZ USK Praha (9 April 2025)
Assists	(Spain) Maite Cazorla	(Czech Republic) ZVVZ USK Praha	12	(France) Basket Landes (19 February 2025)
Steals	(Spain) Helena Pueyo	(Spain) Casademont Zaragoza	7	(France) ESB Villeneuve-d'Ascq (27 November 2024)
Steals	(France) Pauline Astier	(France) Tango Bourges Basket	7	(Turkey) CBK Mersin (29 October 2024)
Blocks	(France) Myriam Djekoundade	(France) Basket Landes	4	(Turkey) CBK Mersin (8 January 2025)
Blocks	(Poland) Weronika Telenga	(Hungary) Uni Győr	4	(Spain) Valencia Basket (27 November 2024)
Blocks	(Poland) Weronika Telenga	(Hungary) Uni Győr	4	(Czech Republic) ZVVZ USK Praha (21 November 2024)
Blocks	(Czech Republic) Emma Čechová	(Czech Republic) Žabiny Brno	4	(Greece) Olympiacos SFP (30 October 2024)

=== Team statistics ===
Category	Team	Average
Efficiency	(Turkey) Fenerbahçe Opet	101.3
Points	(Turkey) Fenerbahçe Opet	78.8
Rebounds	(Czech Republic) ZVVZ USK Praha	41.1
Assists	(Turkey) Fenerbahçe Opet	24.7
Steals	(Turkey) Fenerbahçe Opet	11.9
Blocks	(Czech Republic) Žabiny Brno	2.9
Turnovers	(Hungary) DVTK HUN-Therm	18
FT %	(Turkey) CBK Mersin	82.6%
2-Point %	(Turkey) Fenerbahçe Opet	56.1%
3-Point %	(Turkey) CBK Mersin	37.1%

=== Team game highs ===
Category	Team	Statistic	Opponent
Efficiency	(Turkey) CBK Mersin	127	(Greece) Olympiacos SFP (27 November 2024)
Efficiency	(Turkey) Fenerbahçe Opet	127	(France) ESB Villeneuve-d'Ascq (29 October 2024)
Efficiency	(Czech Republic) Žabiny Brno	127	(Greece) Olympiacos SFP (8 October 2024)
Points	(Czech Republic) ZVVZ USK Praha	100	(Italy) Umana Reyer Venezia (27 November 2024)
Rebounds	(Spain) Casademont Zaragoza	52	(Italy) Umana Reyer Venezia (16 January 2025)
Assists	(Turkey) CBK Mersin	33	(Czech Republic) Žabiny Brno (16 October 2024)
Steals	(Italy) Umana Reyer Venezia	17	(Spain) Casademont Zaragoza (16 January 2025)
Steals	(Turkey) Fenerbahçe Opet	17	(Spain) Valencia Basket (8 January 2025)
Blocks	(Czech Republic) ZVVZ USK Praha	9	(Hungary) Uni Győr (21 November 2024)

== Attendances ==
Pos	Team	Total	High	Low	Average	Change
1	(Spanish Basketball Federation) Casademont Zaragoza	32,350	5,900	4,100	4,621	n/a
2	(French Federation of Basketball) Tango Bourges Basket	26,550	5,000	3,100	3,793	n/a
3	Final Six in Zaragoza	19,838	4,642	2,180	3,306	n/a
4	(Spanish Basketball Federation) Perfumerías Avenida	16,900	3,000	2,400	2,817	n/a
5	(Turkish Basketball Federation) CBK Mersin	19,500	3,000	2,000	2,786	n/a
6	(Spanish Basketball Federation) Valencia Basket	16,350	3,000	2,150	2,725	n/a
7	(French Federation of Basketball) Basket Landes	20,700	2,600	2,500	2,588	n/a
8	(French Federation of Basketball) ESB Villeneuve-d'Ascq	4,100	2,200	1,900	2,050	n/a
9	(Italian Basketball Federation) Beretta Famila Schio	11,900	2,400	1,250	1,700	n/a
10	(Czech Basketball Federation) Žabiny Brno	8,750	1,400	1,100	1,250	n/a
11	(Hungarian Basketball Federation) DVTK HUN-Therm	3,500	1,200	1,100	1,167	n/a
12	(Italian Basketball Federation) Umana Reyer Venezia	5,800	1,600	850	1,160	n/a
13	(Czech Basketball Federation) ZVVZ USK Praha	6,800	1,300	900	1,133	n/a
14	(Turkish Basketball Federation) Fenerbahçe Opet	5,150	1,000	600	858	n/a
15	(Hungarian Basketball Federation) Uni Győr	1,050	450	250	350	n/a
16	(Hellenic Basketball Federation) Olympiacos SFP	750	250	250	250	n/a
	League total	209,988	5,900	250	2,359	n/a

Source: EuroLeague Women

== See also ==
- 2024–25 EuroCup Women
- 2024–25 EuroCup Women qualification round
- 2024–25 EuroCup Women knockout stage
- 2024 FIBA Europe SuperCup Women
- 2024–25 EuroLeague
