= 2024 FIBA Europe SuperCup Women =

Supercup

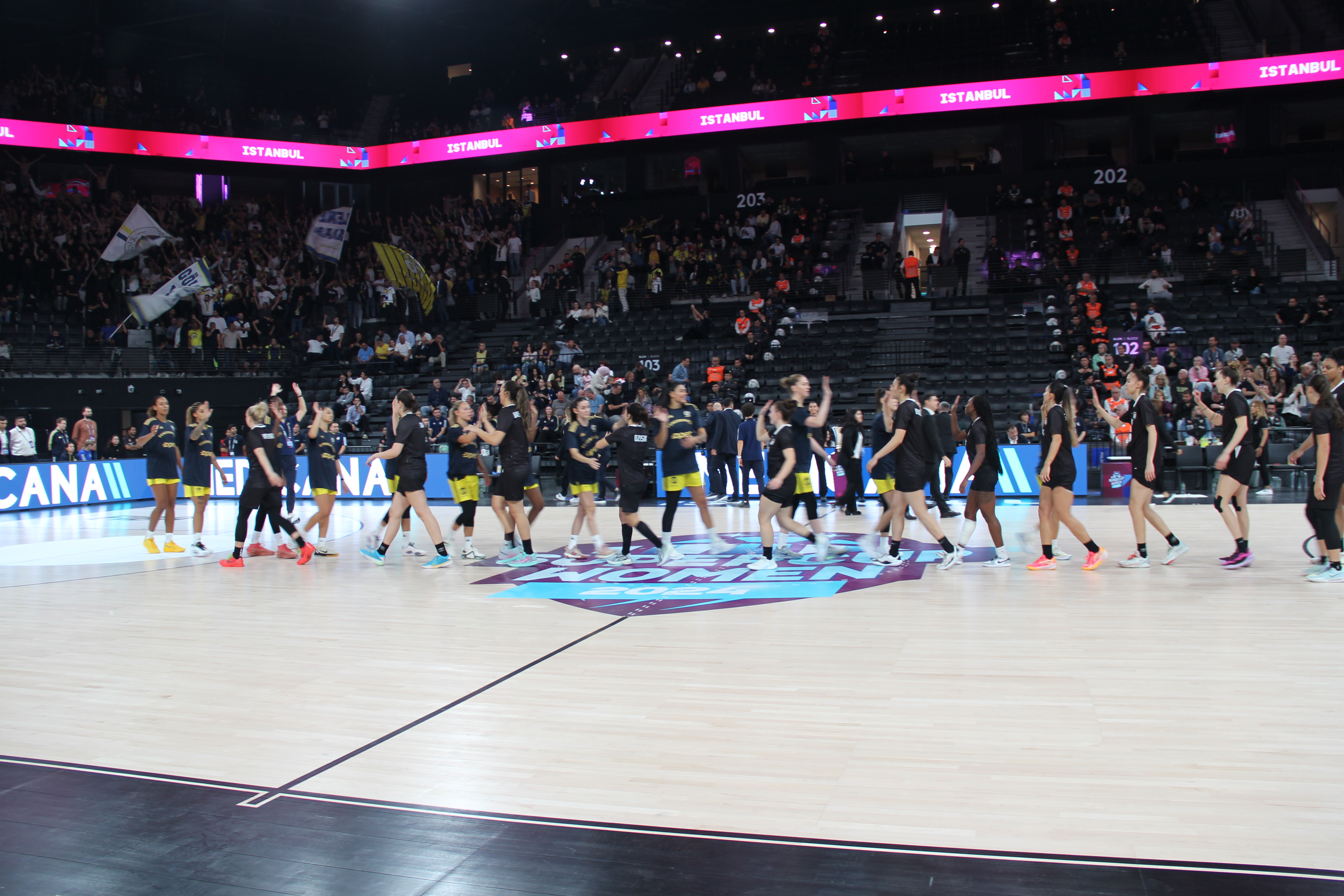
- The match was played at the TBF Basketball Development Center in Istanbul, Turkey.

Tournament details
- Dates: 3 October 2024

Final positions
- Champions: (Turkey) Fenerbahçe (2nd title)
- Runners-up: (Turkey) Beşiktaş

Awards and statistics
- MVP: (France) Gabby Williams
- Top scorer(s): (United States) Khaalia Hillsman (20 pts)
- Attendance: 0 (behind closed doors)

The 2024 FIBA Europe SuperCup Women was the 13th edition of the FIBA Europe SuperCup Women. It was supposed to be held on 2 October 2024, at the TBF Basketball Development Center in Istanbul between Fenerbahçe and Beşiktaş, but was held the following day behind closed doors due to fan trouble. Fenerbahçe won their second SuperCup with a win over Beşiktaş.

== Teams ==
The game will be an all turkish encounter between Fenerbahçe and Beşiktaş, with the latter participating in the game after the EuroCup winners, London Lions, withdrew.

| Team | Qualification | Previous participation (bold indicates winners) |
|---|---|---|
| (Turkey) Fenerbahçe | Winners of the 2023–24 EuroLeague Women | **2023** |
| (Turkey) Beşiktaş | Runners up of the 2023–24 EuroCup Women | None |

== Venue ==
The TBF Basketball Development Center in Istanbul hosted the match

| 2024 FIBA Europe SuperCup Women is located in Istanbul | Istanbul |
|---|---|
| 2024 FIBA Europe SuperCup Women is located in Istanbul | TBF Basketball Development Center |
| 2024 FIBA Europe SuperCup Women is located in Istanbul | Capacity:10,000 |

== Final ==
The match was supposed to be played on 2 October at 19:00 local time. But only a minute and a half after the match started, the game was delayed and later postponed for the following day behind closed doors due to crowd trouble.

Regarding the fan trouble, pyrotechnics were thrown on the count multiple times, also hitting the Beşiktaş bench before they left. It is also reported that fans from both sides were fighting each other outside the arena.

3 October 2024
16:00

Boxscore

| Beşiktaş (Turkey) | 63–**79** | (Turkey) **Fenerbahçe** |
Scoring by quarter: 16–16, **21**–17, 14–**22**, 12–**24**
| Pts: Hillsman 20; Rebs: Hillsman 11; Asts: Mühl 9 | | Pts: Uzun 15; Rebs: Williams 7 Asts: Williams 5 |

Basketball Development Center, Istanbul
Attendance: 0
Referees: Yasmina Alcaraz Moreno (ESP), Amel Dahra (FRA), Veronika Obertova (SVK)

| Starters: | | | Pts | Reb | Ast |
|---|---|---|---|---|---|
| PG | 91 | (Germany) Nika Mühl | 11 | 3 | 9 |
| SG | 0 | (Serbia) Mihaela Lazić | 4 | 3 | 5 |
| SF | 7 | (United Kingdom) Holly Winterburn | 14 | 4 | 2 |
| PF | 11 | (Turkey) Elif Bayram | 14 | 5 | 4 |
| C | 00 | (United States) Khaalia Hillsman | 20 | 11 | 1 |
| Reserves: | | | | | |
| G | 1 | (United States) Dana Evans | DNP | | |
| F | 2 | (Turkey) Esra Güvenç | DNP | | |
| SG | 5 | (Turkey) Pelin Gülçelik | 0 | 0 | 0 |
| G | 10 | (Turkey) Özge Özışık | 0 | 1 | 0 |
| PG | 12 | (Turkey) Zeynep Can | DNP | | |
| C | 15 | (Turkey) Gizem Başaran | 0 | 0 | 0 |
| PF | 30 | (Turkey) Melek Uzunoğlu | 0 | 1 | 1 |
Head coach:
(Turkish Basketball Federation) Aziz Akkaya

| **Beşiktaş** | **Fenerbahçe** |

| Beşiktaş | Statistics | Fenerbahçe |
|---|---|---|
| 20/38 (52.6%) | 2-pt field goals | 26/42 (61.9%) |
| 6/18 (33.3%) | 3-pt field goals | 7/21 (33.3%) |
| 5/8 (62.5%) | Free throws | 6/8 (75%) |
| 4 | Offensive rebounds | 4 |
| 27 | Defensive rebounds | 26 |
| 31 | Total rebounds | 30 |
| 22 | Assists | 22 |
| 20 | Turnovers | 13 |
| 7 | Steals | 8 |
| 0 | Blocks | 1 |
| 17 | Fouls | 14 |

2024 FIBA Europe SuperCup Women winners

**Fenerbahçe**
**Second title**

| Starters: | | | Pts | Reb | Ast |
|---|---|---|---|---|---|
| PG | 22 | (Belgium) Julie Allemand | 7 | 1 | 4 |
| SG | 2 | (Turkey) Sevgi Uzun | 15 | 0 | 2 |
| SF | 5 | (United States) Gabby Williams | 11 | 7 | 5 |
| PF | 11 | (Belgium) Emma Meesseman | 14 | 6 | 4 |
| C | 25 | (France) Marième Badiane | 10 | 3 | 2 |
| Reserves: | | | | | |
| SG | 3 | (United States) Ariel Atkins | 12 | 2 | 1 |
| PG | 4 | (Turkey) Olcay Çakır | 2 | 0 | 1 |
| F | 9 | (Turkey) İdil Saçalır | 0 | 0 | 0 |
| PG | 10 | (Turkey) Alperi Onar | 0 | 0 | 3 |
| C | 13 | (Serbia) Nikolina Milić | 6 | 1 | 0 |
| PF | 15 | (Turkey) Tilbe Şenyürek | 0 | 1 | 0 |
| C | 31 | (United States) Tina Charles | 2 | 4 | 0 |
Head coach:
(French Federation of Basketball) Valérie Garnier

== See also ==
- 2024–25 EuroLeague Women
- 2024–25 EuroCup Women
- 2024–25 EuroLeague Women regular season
- 2024–25 EuroLeague Women qualification round
- 2024–25 EuroCup Women qualification round
- 2024–25 EuroCup Women knockout stage
