= 2024–25 EuroCup Women knockout stage =

EuroCup Women knockout season
- Season: 2024–25
- Dates: 12 December 2024 – 8 April 2025
- Games played: 62
- Teams: 32 (from 14 countries)

The 2024–25 EuroCup Women knockout stage details the matches played to decide the champion of the tournament. Games took place between the 12 December 2024 and 8 April 2025.

== Qualified teams ==
28 teams from the regular season advanced to knockout stage alongside four teams from the EuroLeague Women who dropped down to this tournament due to them finishing last in the first round of the EuroLeague Women.

=== Eliminated from EuroLeague Women ===
Group	Team
A	(Hungary) DVTK HUN-Therm
B	(Greece) Olympiacos SFP
C	(France) ESB Villeneuve-d'Ascq
D	(Hungary) Uni Győr

=== Advanced from regular season ===
Group	Winners	Runners-up	Third place
A	(France) LDLC ASVEL Féminin	(Poland) InvestInTheWest Enea Gorzów Wielkopolski	
B	(Spain) Hozono Global Jairis CB	(France) UFAB 49	
C	(Spain) IDK Euskotren	(Serbia) Crvena zvezda	
D	(France) BLMA	(Lithuania) BC Neptūnas-Amberton	
E	(Hungary) Sopron Basket	(France) Charnay Basket	
F	(Belgium) Castors Braine	(Germany) Rutronik Stars Keltern	(Romania) CSM Constanța
G	(France) Tarbes GB	(Spain) Movistar Estudiantes	(Hungary) TARR KSC Szekszárd
H	(Poland) VBW Arka Gdynia	(Lithuania) Kibirkštis	(Israel) Elitzur Landco Ramla
I	(Poland) MB Zagłębie Sosnowiec	(Italy) BDS Dinamo Sassari	
J	(Turkey) Galatasaray Cagdas Faktoring	(Spain) Baxi Ferrol	
K	(Turkey) Beşiktaş	(Italy) GEAS Basket	
L	(Spain) Spar Girona	(Italy) La Molisana Campobasso	(Hungary) NKA Universitas PEAC

== Seeding ==
The seeding was based on the results of the previous round. The four eliminated teams from the EuroLeague Women were pre-seeded into positions 1–4.

Seed	Grp	Team	Pld	W	L	PF	PA	PD	Pts	Qualification
1	A	(Hungary) DVTK HUN-Therm	6	1	5	356	390	−34	7	EuroLeague Women
2	B	(France) ESB Villeneuve-d'Ascq	6	1	5	402	486	−84	7	EuroLeague Women
3	C	(Hungary) Uni Győr	6	0	6	404	485	−81	6	EuroLeague Women
4	D	(Greece) Olympiacos SFP	6	0	6	365	507	−142	6	EuroLeague Women
5	A	(France) LDLC ASVEL Féminin	6	6	0	560	337	+223	12	First place
6	D	(France) BLMA	6	6	0	499	339	+160	12	First place
7	K	(Turkey) Beşiktaş	6	6	0	508	366	+142	12	First place
8	B	(Spain) Hozono Global Jairis CB	6	6	0	506	365	+141	12	First place
9	C	(Spain) IDK Euskotren	6	6	0	438	340	+98	12	First place
10	I	(Poland) MB Zagłębie Sosnowiec	6	6	0	477	380	+97	12	First place
11	G	(France) Tarbes GB	6	5	1	527	311	+216	11	First place
12	J	(Turkey) Galatasaray Cagdas Faktoring	6	5	1	514	363	+151	11	First place
13	L	(Spain) Spar Girona	6	5	1	525	398	+127	11	First place
14	E	(Hungary) Sopron Basket	6	5	1	450	361	+89	11	First place
15	H	(Poland) VBW Arka Gdynia	6	5	1	467	403	+64	11	First place
16	F	(Belgium) Castors Braine	6	4	2	453	436	+17	10	First place
17	J	(Spain) Baxi Ferrol	6	5	1	455	353	+102	11	Second place
18	G	(Spain) Movistar Estudiantes	6	4	2	532	399	+133	10	Second place
19	K	(Italy) GEAS Basket	6	4	2	450	362	+88	10	Second place
20	L	(Italy) La Molisana Campobasso	6	4	2	494	411	+83	10	Second place
21	C	(Serbia) Crvena zvezda	6	4	2	456	373	+83	10	Second place
22	F	(Germany) Rutronik Stars Keltern	6	4	2	478	422	+56	10	Second place
23	B	(France) UFAB 49	6	4	2	467	414	+53	10	Second place
24	E	(France) Charnay Basket	6	4	2	415	364	+51	10	Second place
25	I	(Italy) BDS Dinamo Sassari	6	4	2	445	407	+38	10	Second place
26	A	(Poland) InvestInTheWest Enea Gorzów Wielkopolski	6	3	3	490	422	+68	9	Second place
27	D	(Lithuania) BC Neptūnas-Amberton	6	3	3	397	391	+6	9	Second place
28	H	(Lithuania) Kibirkštis	6	3	3	433	428	+5	9	Second place
29	L	(Hungary) NKA Universitas PEAC	6	3	3	505	379	+126	9	Third place
30	G	(Hungary) TARR KSC Szekszárd	6	3	3	498	420	+78	9	Third place
31	F	(Romania) CSM Constanța	6	3	3	471	470	+1	9	Third place
32	H	(Israel) Elitzur Landco Ramla	6	3	3	435	451	−16	9	Third place

Source: FIBA
Rules for classification: 1) Points; 2) Points difference; 3) Points scored.

== Bracket ==
Play-off Round 1
21	(Serbia) Crvena zvezda	72	75	147
12	(Turkey) Galatasaray Cagdas Faktoring	95	82	177
28	(Lithuania) Kibirkštis	85	67	152
5	(France) LDLC ASVEL Féminin	85	69	154
20	(Italy) La Molisana Campobasso	73	71	144
13	(Spain) Spar Girona	75	82	157
29	(Hungary) NKA Universitas Pecs	85	75	160
4	(Greece) Olympiacos SFP	63	93	156
24	(France) Charnay Basket	68	66	134
9	(Spain) IDK Euskotren	68	73	141
25	(Italy) BDS Dinamo Sassari	60	71	131
8	(Spain) Hozono Global Jairis	54	74	128
17	(Spain) Baxi Ferrol	83	97	180
16	(Belgium) Castors Braine	58	75	133
32	(Israel) Elitzur Landco Ramla	75	71	146
1	(Hungary) DVTK HUN-Therm	81	77	158
22	(Germany) Rutronik Stars Keltern	60	71	131
11	(France) Tarbes GB	45	50	95
27	(Lithuania) BC Neptūnas-Amberton	60	55	115
6	(France) BLMA	96	65	161
19	(Italy) GEAS Basket	66	45	111
14	(Hungary) Sopron Basket	79	64	143
30	(Hungary) KSC Szekszárd	77	73	150
3	(Hungary) Uni Győr	92	98	190
23	(France) UFAB 49	86	90	176
10	(Poland) MB Zagłębie Sosnowiec	60	88	148
26	(Poland) InvestInTheWest Enea Gorzów Wielkopolski	64	71	135
7	(Turkey) Beşiktaş	80	80	160
18	(Spain) Movistar Estudiantes	82	59	141
15	(Poland) VBW Arka Gdynia	77	59	136
31	(Romania) CSM Constanța	69	71	140
2	(France) ESB Villeneuve-d'Ascq	88	91	179

Round of 16
12	(Turkey) Galatasaray Cagdas Faktoring	77	56	133
5	(France) LDLC ASVEL Féminin	72	87	159
13	(Spain) Spar Girona	73	88	161
29	(Hungary) NKA Universitas Pecs	85	65	150
9	(Spain) IDK Euskotren	50	71	121
25	(Italy) BDS Dinamo Sassari	60	83	143
17	(Spain) Baxi Ferrol	78	60	138
1	(Hungary) DVTK Hun-Therm	73	60	133
22	(Germany) Rutronik Stars Keltern	62	45	107
6	(France) BLMA	56	63	119
14	(Hungary) Sopron Basket	89	80	169
3	(Hungary) Uni Győr	83	62	145
23	(France) UFAB 49	52	76	128
7	(Turkey) Beşiktaş	64	66	130
18	(Spain) Movistar Estudiantes	75	90	165
2	(France) ESB Villeneuve-d'Ascq	65	108	173

Quarterfinals
5	(France) LDLC ASVEL Féminin	72	72	144
13	(Spain) Spar Girona	77	51	128
25	(Italy) BDS Dinamo Sassari	76	70	146
17	(Spain) Baxi Ferrol	95	89	184
6	(France) BLMA	54	69	123
14	(Hungary) Sopron Basket	81	57	138
7	(Turkey) Beşiktaş	72	81	153
2	(France) ESB Villeneuve-d'Ascq	91	81	172

Semifinals
5	(France) LDLC ASVEL Féminin	62	74	136
17	(Spain) Baxi Ferrol	93	63	156
14	(Hungary) Sopron Basket	66	46	112
2	(France) ESB Villeneuve-d'Ascq	73	54	127

Final
17	(Spain) Baxi Ferrol	75	70	145
2	(France) ESB Villeneuve-d'Ascq	78	84	162

== Play-off Round 1 ==
=== Summary ===
The first legs were played on 11 and 12 December, and the second legs were played on 17 and 19 December 2024.

Team 1	Agg.	Team 2	1st leg	2nd leg
Elitzur Landco Ramla (Israel)	146–158	(Hungary) DVTK HUN-Therm	75–81	71–77
CSM Constanța (Romania)	140–179	(France) ESB Villeneuve-d'Ascq	69–88	71–91
KSC Szekszárd (Hungary)	150–190	(Hungary) Uni Győr	77–92	73–98
NKA Universitas PEAC (Hungary)	160–156	(Greece) Olympiacos SFP	85–63	75–93
Kibirkštis (Lithuania)	152–154	(France) LDLC ASVEL Féminin	85–85	67–69
BC Neptūnas-Amberton (Lithuania)	115–161 (Note: Order of legs reversed.)	(France) BLMA	60–96	55–65
InvestInTheWest Enea Gorzów Wielkopolski (Poland)	135–160	(Turkey) Beşiktaş	64–80	71–80
BDS Dinamo Sassari (Italy)	131–128	(Spain) Hozono Global Jairis	60–54	71–74
Charnay Basket (France)	134–141	(Spain) IDK Euskotren	68–68	66–73
UFAB 49 (France)	176–148	(Poland) MB Zagłębie Sosnowiec	86–60	90–88
Rutronik Stars Keltern (Germany)	131–95	(France) Tarbes GB	60–45	71–50
Crvena zvezda (Serbia)	147–177	(Turkey) Galatasaray Cagdas Faktoring	72–95	75–82
La Molisana Campobasso (Italy)	144–157	(Spain) Spar Girona	73–75	71–82
GEAS Basket (Italy)	111–143	(Hungary) Sopron Basket	66–79	45–64
Movistar Estudiantes (Spain)	141–136	(Poland) VBW Arka Gdynia	82–77	59–59
Baxi Ferrol (Spain)	180–133	(Belgium) Castors Braine	83–58	97–75

==== Matches ====
17 December 2024
18:00

Report

Elitzur Landco Ramla (Israel)	75–81	(Hungary) DVTK HUN-Therm
Scoring by quarter: 18–28, 20–29, 14–7, 23–17
Pts: Simms 23; Rebs: Prince 6 Asts: Simms 13		Pts: Charles 24; Rebs: Lelik 10; Asts: Kanyasi 9

DVTK Arena, Miskolc (Note: Due to the Gaza war, teams from Israel play their play their games of the country.)
Attendance: 1,500
Referees: Nikola Perlic (CRO), Alexandra-Ioana Stan (ROU), Michal Sosin (POL)

19 December 2024
18:00

Report

DVTK HUN-Therm (Hungary)	77–71	(Israel) Elitzur Landco Ramla
Scoring by quarter: 15–19, 20–21, 16–14, 26–17
Pts: Charles 18; Rebs: Charles 6 Asts: Kanyasi, Miklos 5		Pts: Prince 24; Rebs: Bulgak 8 Asts: Simms 8

DVTK Arena, Miskolc
Attendance: 1,800
Referees: Branimir Galić (CRO), Amalia Marchiş (ROU), Luka Brekalo (BIH)

DVTK HUN-Therm won 158–146 on aggregate

12 December 2024
19:00

Report

CSM Constanța (Romania)	69–88	(France) ESB Villeneuve-d'Ascq
Scoring by quarter: 14–30, 21–22, 18–19, 16–17
Pts: Marginean 17; Rebs: Williams 12; Asts: Dzombeta 5		Pts: Gueye 23; Rebs: Peters 12; Asts: Heriaud, Leite 6

Sala Sporturilor, Constanța
Attendance: 300
Referees: Nikolaos Tziopanos (GRE), Suzana Vujicic (MNE), Anastasia Tsakiraki (GRE)

18 December 2024
20:00

Report

ESB Villeneuve-d'Ascq (France)	91–71	(Romania) CSM Constanța
Scoring by quarter: 26–18, 16–23, 31–12, 18–18
Pts: Leite 20; Rebs: Peters 9 Asts: Peters 7		Pts: Marginean 25; Rebs: Williams 10; Asts: Williams 6

Palacium, Villeneuve d' Ascq
Attendance: 1,865
Referees: Jurgen Muho (LUX), Milita Stalaucinskaite (LTU), Oleksandr Dotsenko (UKR)

ESB Villeneuve-d'Ascq won 179–140 on aggregate

11 December 2024
18:00

Report

KSC Szekszárd (Hungary)	77–92	(Hungary) Uni Győr
Scoring by quarter: 20–22, 19–22, 18–22, 20–26
Pts: Bejedi 27; Rebs: Westbeld 6 Asts: Johnson 6		Pts: Kiss 24; Rebs: Garbin 9 Asts: Bach, Dombai 5

Szekszárd Városi Sportcsarnok, Szekszárd
Attendance: 550
Referees: Alin Faur (ROU), Stefan Zdravkovic (SRB), Petr Blahout (CZE)

19 December 2024
18:00

Report

Uni Győr (Hungary)	98–73	(Hungary) KSC Szekszárd
Scoring by quarter: 23–22, 27–14, 30–22, 18–15
Pts: Kiss 19; Rebs: Garbin 6 Asts: Dombai 6		Pts: Westbeld 15; Rebs: Johnson 7 Asts: Bejedi 5

University Hall of Györ, Győr
Attendance: 300
Referees: Domen Krajnc (SLO), Danilo Petkovic (SRB), Artjoms Ribakovs (SVK)

Uni Győr won 190–150 on aggregate

11 December 2024
18:00

Report

NKA Universitas PEAC (Hungary)	85–63	(Greece) Olympiacos SFP
Scoring by quarter: 16–17, 23–16, 32–16, 14–19
Pts: Zsebe-Weninger 14; Rebs: Reisingerova 8 Asts: Studer 5		Pts: Christinaki 19; Rebs: Christinaki 10; Asts: three players 3

Lauber Dezső Sports Hall, Pécs
Attendance: 800
Referees: Haris Bijedic (BIH), Nemanja Vlahovic (SRB), Vojkan Zivkovic (SRB)

19 December 2024
18:00

Report

Olympiacos SFP (Greece)	93–75	(Hungary) NKA Universitas PEAC
Scoring by quarter: 26–16, 12–23, 24–18, 31–18
Pts: Christinaki, Raca 22; Rebs: Hempe, Tobin 10; Asts: Lambert 14		Pts: Reisingerova 22; Rebs: Reisingerova 17; Asts: five players 2

Peace and Friendship Stadium, Piraeus
Attendance: 150
Referees: Nir Meirson (ISR), Or Zror (ISR), Stefan Kuburovic (MNE)

NKA Universitas PEAC won 160–156 on aggregate

12 December 2024
19:00

Report

Kibirkštis (Lithuania)	85–85	(France) LDLC ASVEL Féminin
Scoring by quarter: 25–14, 13–23, 25–22, 22–26
Pts: Taylor 20; Rebs: Use 18; Asts: Labuckiene, Miknaite 5		Pts: Jocytė 19; Rebs: Wojta 8 Asts: Harris 6

Active Vilnius Arena, Vilnius
Attendance: 850
Referees: Lukasz Jankowski (POL), Joona Haaja (FIN), Kristine Simanovica (LAT)

18 December 2024
20:00

Report

LDLC ASVEL Féminin (France)	69–67	(Lithuania) Kibirkštis
Scoring by quarter: 21–17, 16–20, 18–18, 14–12
Pts: Malonga 18; Rebs: Malonga, Wojta 10; Asts: Pasa 6		Pts: Taylor 20; Rebs: Labuckiene 11; Asts: Miknaite 5

Gymnase Mado Bonnet, Lyon
Attendance: 611
Referees: Roberto Lucas Martinez (ESP), Sarty Nghixulifwe (NAM), Raul Zambrano Sanchez (ESP)

LDLC ASVEL Féminin won 154–152 on aggregate

12 December 2024
20:00

Report

BLMA (France)	96–60	(Lithuania) BC Neptūnas-Amberton
Scoring by quarter: 32–14, 20–20, 19–16, 25–10
Pts: Rabot 24; Rebs: Angloma 11; Asts: Limouzin 7		Pts: Balaban 18; Rebs: Sventoraite 7 Asts: Solopova 5

Palais des Sports de Lattes, Lattes
Attendance: 1,066
Referees: Bogna Podkowinska (POL), Rafiks Misirovs (LAT), Karol Kowalski (FIN)

18 December 2024
18:00

Report

BC Neptūnas-Amberton (Lithuania)	55–65	(France) BLMA
Scoring by quarter: 19–22, 9–19, 11–12, 16–12
Pts: Sventoraite 12; Rebs: Stipra 8 Asts: Vilka 4		Pts: Fankam 12; Rebs: Limouzin 10; Asts: Bernies 10

Palangos Sporto Centro Arena, Palanga
Attendance: 97
Referees: Alessandro Perciavalle (ITA), Tomasz Wit Langowski (POL), Kirile Tvauri (GEO)

BLMA won 161–115 on aggregate

11 December 2024
18:00

Report

InvestInTheWest Enea Gorzów Wielkopolski (Poland)	64–80	(Turkey) Beşiktaş
Scoring by quarter: 15–13, 14–22, 18–18, 17–27
Pts: Gertchen 15; Rebs: Miller 10; Asts: Kosla, Tsineke 4		Pts: Krajisnik 16; Rebs: Fagbenle 9 Asts: three players 5

Hala sportowa, Gorzów Wielkopolski
Attendance: 1,300
Referees: Jan Baloun (CZE), Milita Stalaucinskaite (LTU), Martina Makelova (SVK)

19 December 2024
20:00

Report

Beşiktaş (Turkey)	80–71	(Poland) InvestInTheWest Enea Gorzów Wielkopolski
Scoring by quarter: 15–19, 23–19, 25–13, 17–20
Pts: Krajisnik 19; Rebs: Krajisnik 10; Asts: Evans 5		Pts: Walker-Kimbrough 24; Rebs: Miller 13; Asts: Tsineke 6

Besiktas Akatlar Arena, Istanbul
Attendance: 300
Referees: Alija Ferevski (MKD) Natasa Dragojoevic (MNE), Mikheil Vartanov (GEO)

Beşiktaş won 160–135 on aggregate

11 December 2024
20:30

Report

BDS Dinamo Sassari (Italy)	60–54	(Spain) Hozono Global Jairis
Scoring by quarter: 16–17, 21–9, 13–11, 10–17
Pts: Carangelo 18; Rebs: Begić 12; Asts: Carangelo 4		Pts: Bertsch 18; Rebs: Nelson 7 Asts: Ayuso 4

Palaserradimigni, Sassari
Attendance: 300
Referees: Alfred Jovovic (CRO), Ilias Karpanos (GRE), Nikola Perlic (CRO)

18 December 2024
20:30

Report

Hozono Global Jairis (Spain)	74–71	(Italy) BDS Dinamo Sassari
Scoring by quarter: 25–22, 23–21, 17–14, 9–14
Pts: Bertsch 22; Rebs: Nelson 9 Asts: Ayuso 8		Pts: Taylor 32; Rebs: Diallo 6 Asts: Taylor 6

Pabellón Municipal Fausto Vicent, Alcantarilla
Attendance: 1,230
Referees: Vladimir Zanev (BUL), Tom Dehondt (BEL), Kyriacos Christou (CYP)

BDS Dinamo Sassari won 131–128 on aggregate

11 December 2024
20:00

Report

Charnay Basket (France)	68–68	(Spain) IDK Euskotren
Scoring by quarter: 16–18, 18–21, 16–10, 18–19
Pts: Thomas 23; Rebs: Thomas 9 Asts: Makani 10		Pts: Prieto 15; Rebs: Halvarsson, Pendande 7 Asts: Buch 6

Salle des Sports, Prissé
Attendance: 900
Referees: Emma Perry (IRL), Gavin Williams (GBR), Anna Belousova (LAT)

18 December 2024
20:00

Report

IDK Euskotren (Spain)	73–66	(France) Charnay Basket
Scoring by quarter: 13–15, 18–8, 16–23, 26–20
Pts: Washington 23; Rebs: Washington 10; Asts: Gonzalez 6		Pts: Makani 21; Rebs: Thomas, Strautmane 9 Asts: Makani 8

Jose Antonio Gasca, San Sebastián
Attendance: 500
Referees: Martin Van Hoye (BEL), Diogo Martins (POR), Skirmantas Letukas (DEN)

IDK Euskotren won 141–134 on aggregate

11 December 2024
20:00

Report

UFAB 49 (France)	86–60	(Poland) MB Zagłębie Sosnowiec
Scoring by quarter: 19–18, 24–18, 21–10, 22–14
Pts: Dursus 20; Rebs: Ndjock 7 Asts: Ndjock 7		Pts: Borkowska 23; Rebs: Borkowska 15; Asts: Nikitinaite 10

Salle Jean Bouin, Angers
Attendance: 600
Referees: Alfonso Olivares Iglesias (ESP), Sandra Sánchez González (ESP), Tiago Roxo Perdigão (POR)

19 December 2024
18:00

Report

MB Zagłębie Sosnowiec (Poland)	88–90	(France) UFAB 49
Scoring by quarter: 20–13, 26–22, 21–19, 21–36
Pts: Borkowska 29; Rebs: Borkowska 18; Asts: Nikitinaite 7		Pts: Merceron, Dursus 17; Rebs: Dornstauder 9 Asts: Méndez 7

ArcelorMittal Park, Sosnowiec
Attendance: 250
Referees: Rainis Värv (EST), Janis Rozenbergs (LAT), Gabrielius Simonavičius (LTU)

UFAB 49 won 176–148 on aggregate

11 December 2024
18:30

Report

Rutronik Stars Keltern (Germany)	60–45	(France) Tarbes GB
Scoring by quarter: 13–10, 11–15, 20–11, 16–9
Pts: Rosic 17; Rebs: Đorđević 14; Asts: Gilles, Konstantinova 3		Pts: Musa 14; Rebs: Musa 9 Asts: Droguet, Fora 3

Speiterlinghalle, Keltern
Attendance: 200
Referees: Petr Hrusa (CZE), Chess van Looy (BEL), Mateusz Skorek (POL)

18 December 2024
18:30

Report

Tarbes GB (France)	50–71	(Germany) Rutronik Stars Keltern
Scoring by quarter: 14–17, 15–14, 10–16, 11–24
Pts: Sivka, Fora 10; Rebs: Musa 15; Asts: Sivka 4		Pts: Đorđević 17; Rebs: Gilles, Kiss-Rusk 7 Asts: Konstantinova 10

Palais des Sports, Tarbes
Attendance: 680
Referees: Bálázs Meszáros (HUN), Giacomo Dori (ITA), Einars Tukiss (LAT)

Rutronik Stars Keltern won 131–95 on aggregate

11 December 2024
17:00

Report

Crvena zvezda (Serbia)	72–95	(Turkey) Galatasaray Cagdas Faktoring
Scoring by quarter: 21–29, 10–25, 21–20, 20–21
Pts: A. Katanić 19; Rebs: Potter 5 Asts: I. Katanić, A. Katanić 4		Pts: Vanloo 23; Rebs: Šteinberga, Hollingsworth 7 Asts: Vanloo 9

Železnik Hall, Belgrade
Attendance: 100
Referees: Ciprian Stoica (ROU), Peter Zenis (SVK), Viktor NAgy (HUN)

18 December 2024
20:00

Report

Galatasaray Cagdas Faktoring (Turkey)	82–75	(Serbia) Crvena zvezda
Scoring by quarter: 23–16, 22–21, 17–27, 20–11
Pts: Li 24; Rebs: Li 11; Asts: Vanloo 9		Pts: Radić 20; Rebs: Potter 8 Asts: A. Katanić 7

Sinan Erdem Dome, Istanbul
Attendance: 2,150
Referees: Ritvars Helmsteins (LAT), Alin Faur (ROU), Emmouil Tsloakos (GRE)

Galatasaray Cagdas Faktoring won 177–147 on aggregate

11 December 2024
20:30

Report

La Molisana Campobasso (Italy)	73–75	(Spain) Spar Girona
Scoring by quarter: 14–18, 18–13, 27–19, 14–25
Pts: Scalia 20; Rebs: Kunaiyi-Akpanah 9 Asts: Trimboli, Morrison 5		Pts: Bibby 22; Rebs: Bibby 7 Asts: Canella 7

La Molisana Arena, Campobasso
Attendance: 550
Referees: Polat Parlak (TUR), Roko Hordov (CRO), Domen Krajnc (SLO)

19 December 2024
20:30

Report

Spar Girona (Spain)	82–71	(Italy) La Molisana Campobasso
Scoring by quarter: 19–15, 30–17, 20–19, 13–20
Pts: Pierre-Louis 18; Rebs: Bibby 6 Asts: Ygueravide 8		Pts: Morrison 18; Rebs: Kunaiyi-Akpanah 10; Asts: Morrison 4

Pavelló Girona-Fontajau, Girona
Attendance: 2,543
Referees: Alexandre Maret (FRA), Josh Bowe (GBR), Jules Gaduel (FRA)

Spar Girona won 157–144 on aggregate

12 December 2024
20:30

Report

GEAS Basket (Italy)	66–79	(Hungary) Sopron Basket
Scoring by quarter: 19–16, 16–21, 11–26, 20–16
Pts: Gwathmey 17; Rebs: Gwathmey 8 Asts: Conti, Makurat 5		Pts: Friškovec 25; Rebs: Monroe, Krivačević 9 Asts: Friškovec, Reid 6

Palaborsani, Castellanza
Attendance: 150
Referees: Duhan Köyici (TUR), Diana Lapanović (SLO), Teo Miletić (CRO)

19 December 2024
18:30

Report

Sopron Basket (Hungary)	64–45	(Italy) GEAS Basket
Scoring by quarter: 16–13, 12–14, 19–7, 17–11
Pts: Friškovec 14; Rebs: Monroe 6 Asts: Reid 5		Pts: Moore 13; Rebs: Moore 9 Asts: Conti 3

Aréna Sopron, Sopron
Attendance: 700
Referees: Petr Hrusa (CZE), Maria Ignatiou (CYP), Roko Hordov (CRO)

Sopron Basket won 143–111 on aggregate

11 December 2024
20:00

Report

Movistar Estudiantes (Spain)	82–77	(Poland) VBW Arka Gdynia
Scoring by quarter: 22–20, 22–15, 20–18, 18–24
Pts: Ángela Salvadores 21; Rebs: Bühner 9 Asts: Salvadores 8		Pts: Hebard 29; Rebs: Jones 11; Asts: Wrzesiński 10

Polideportivo Antonio Magariños, Madrid
Attendance: 353
Referees: Valerio Grigioni (ITA), Martin van Hoye (BEL), James Kerry Dominique (GIB)

18 December 2024
19:15

Report

VBW Arka Gdynia (Poland)	59–59	(Spain) Movistar Estudiantes
Scoring by quarter: 15–4, 15–23, 13–20, 16–12
Pts: Jones 21; Rebs: Hebard, Jones 10; Asts: Wrzesiński 5		Pts: Bühner 19; Rebs: Bühner 10; Asts: Salvadores 7

Polsat Plus Arena Gdynia, Gdynia
Attendance: 400
Referees: Alakbar Hasanov (AZE), Veronika Vávrová (CZE), Denys Povorozniuk (UKR)

Movistar Estudiantes won 141–136 on aggregate

12 December 2024
20:00

Report

Baxi Ferrol (Spain)	83–58	(Belgium) Castors Braine
Scoring by quarter: 27–17, 20–12, 14–15, 22–14
Pts: Mataix 16; Rebs: Pospíšilová, Melia 7 Asts: Melia 6		Pts: Miller, Redmond 13; Rebs: Miller 8

Polideportivo A Malata, Ferrol
Attendance: 1,200
Referees: Alexandre Maret (FRA), Luís Daniel Mascarenhas de Oliveira (POR), Sara Månsson (SWE)

19 December 2024
20:00

Report

Castors Braine (Belgium)	75–97	(Spain) Baxi Ferrol
Scoring by quarter: 10–25, 28–30, 24–17, 13–25
Pts: da Costa 17; Rebs: Vitulová 11; Asts: Redmond 6		Pts: Pospíšilová 21; Rebs: Morro 7 Asts: Millán 7

Stade Gaston Reiff, Braine-l'Alleud
Attendance: 250
Referees: Tijmen Last (NED), Armin Mutapcic (GER), David Tomasson (ISL)

Baxi Ferrol won 180–133 on aggregate

== Round of 16 ==
=== Summary ===
The first legs were played on 7 and 8 January, and the second legs were played on 14 and 15 January 2025.

Team 1	Agg.	Team 2	1st leg	2nd leg
Baxi Ferrol (Spain)	138–133	(Hungary) DVTK HUN-Therm	78–73	60–60
Movistar Estudiantes (Spain)	165–173	(France) ESB Villeneuve-d'Ascq	75–65	90–108
Sopron Basket (Hungary)	169–145	(Hungary) Uni Győr	89–83	80–62
Spar Girona (Spain)	161–150 (Note: Order of legs reversed.)	(Hungary) NKA Universitas PEAC	73–85	88–65
Galatasaray Cagdas Faktoring (Turkey)	133–159	(France) LDLC ASVEL Féminin	77–72	56–87
Rutronik Stars Keltern (Germany)	107–119	(France) BLMA	62–56	45–63
UFAB 49 (France)	128–130	(Turkey) Beşiktaş	52–64	76–66
IDK Euskotren (Spain)	121–143 (Note: Order of legs reversed.)	(Italy) BDS Dinamo Sassari	50–60	71–83

==== Matches ====
9 January 2025
20:00

Report

Baxi Ferrol (Spain)	78–73	(Hungary) DVTK HUN-Therm
Scoring by quarter: 24–11, 11–29, 23–16, 20–17
Pts: Mataix 32; Rebs: Mestres, Mataix 6 Asts: Mestres 5		Pts: Charles 18; Rebs: Charles, Grigalauskytė 7 Asts: Jovanović 7

Polideportivo A Malata, Ferrol
Attendance: 1,564
Referees: Ali Sakaci (TUR), Emma Perry (IRL), Ilias Karpanos (GRE)

16 January 2025
18:00

Report

DVTK HUN-Therm (Hungary)	60–60	(Spain) Baxi Ferrol
Scoring by quarter: 11–10, 16–6, 20–13, 13–31
Pts: Tadić 19; Rebs: Charles 9 Asts: Lelik, Jovanović 6		Pts: Mestres, Mataix 16; Rebs: Pospíšilová, Mataix 8 Asts: Pospíšilová 5

DVTK Arena, Miskolc
Attendance: 2,400
Referees: Polat Parlak (TUR), Martina Mekelová (SVK), Haris Bijedić (BIH)

Baxi Ferrol won 138–133 on aggregate

8 January 2025
20:00

Report

Movistar Estudiantes (Spain)	75–65	(France) ESB Villeneuve-d'Ascq
Scoring by quarter: 24–19, 20–15, 17–18, 14–13
Pts: Salvadores 15; Rebs: Bühner 6 Asts: Salvadores, Whittle 4		Pts: Foppossi 12; Rebs: Guèye 8 Asts: Leite 4

Polideportivo Antonio Magariños, Madrid
Attendance: 691
Referees: Gellert Kapitány (HUN), Andrea Bongiorni (ITA), Diogo Martins (POR)

15 January 2025
20:00

Report

ESB Villeneuve-d'Ascq (France)	108–90 (OT)	(Spain) Movistar Estudiantes
Scoring by quarter: 24–20, 21–15, 16–14, 13–15, Overtime: 9–9, 10–10, 15–7
Pts: Leite 28; Rebs: Guèye 14; Asts: Paget 6		Pts: Salvadores 24; Rebs: Whittle 12; Asts: Camilión 9

Le Palacium, Villeneuve d'Ascq
Attendance: 2,050
Referees: Radomir Vojinovic (MNE), Karolina Andersson (FIN), Armin Mutapcic (GER)

ESB Villeneuve-d'Ascq won 173–165 on aggregate

9 January 2025
18:00

Report

Uni Győr (Hungary)	83–89	(Hungary) Sopron Basket
Scoring by quarter: 22–23, 18–23, 20–26, 23–17
Pts: Kiss, Dubei 15; Rebs: Kiss 8 Asts: Ruff-Nagy 5		Pts: Monroe 20; Rebs: Monroe, Brooks 6 Asts: Pavlopoulou 7

University Hall of Györ, Győr
Attendance: 500
Referees: Jan Baloun (CZE), Sandra Sánchez González (ESP), Peter Zenis (SVK)

15 January 2025
18:30

Report

Sopron Basket (Hungary)	80–62	(Hungary) Uni Győr
Scoring by quarter: 19–14, 23–15, 17–15, 21–18
Pts: Krivačević 20; Rebs: Monroe 8 Asts: Reid 5		Pts: Dombai 12; Rebs: Dombai 8 Asts: Kiss, Dombai 4

Aréna Sopron, Sopron
Attendance: 800
Referees: Mehmet Şahin (TUR), Goran Grbić (SLO), Aleksandar Radonjić (AUT)

Sopron Basket won 169–145 on aggregate

9 January 2025
18:00

Report

NKA Universitas PEAC (Hungary)	85–73	(Spain) Spar Girona
Scoring by quarter: 21–14, 22–28, 18–16, 24–15
Pts: Reisingerova 24; Rebs: Reisingerova 6 Asts: Reisingerova 4		Pts: Hristova 22; Rebs: Canella 8 Asts: Hristova 5

Lauber Dezső Sports Hall, Pécs
Attendance: 700
Referees: Stylianos Simeonidis (GRE), Milita Stalaucinskaite (LTU), Stefan Zdravkovic (SRB)

16 January 2025
19:30

Report

Spar Girona (Spain)	88–65	(Hungary) NKA Universitas PEAC
Scoring by quarter: 20–13, 22–15, 25–19, 21–18
Pts: Lundquist 21; Rebs: Canella 9 Asts: Lundquist 5		Pts: Reisingerova 16; Rebs: Tóth, Reisingerova 8 Asts: Studer 5

Pavelló Girona-Fontajau, Girona
Attendance: 3,122
Referees: Branimir Galić (CRO), Paul Unsworth (GBR), Tiago Roxo Perdigão (POR)

Spar Girona won 161–150 on aggregate

9 January 2025
20:00

Report

Galatasaray Cagdas Faktoring (Turkey)	77–72	(France) LDLC ASVEL Féminin
Scoring by quarter: 18–25, 16–14, 18–21, 25–12
Pts: Fraser 16; Rebs: Fraser 8 Asts: Vanloo 9		Pts: Harris 23; Rebs: Quevedo 7 Asts: Quevedo 4

Sinan Erdem Dome, Istanbul
Attendance: 500
Referees: Nemanja Ninkovic (SRB), Suzana Vujicic (MNE), Alessandro Perciavalle (ITA)

15 January 2025
20:00

Report

LDLC ASVEL Féminin (France)	87–56	(Turkey) Galatasaray Cagdas Faktoring
Scoring by quarter: 18–13, 14–18, 20–9, 35–16
Pts: Jocytė, Malonga 18; Rebs: Quevedo, Malonga 14; Asts: Harris, Pasa 5		Pts: Šteinberga 15; Rebs: Li 5 Asts: Vanloo 5

Palais des Sports Gerland, Lyon
Attendance: 750
Referees: Ciprian Stoica (ROU), David Tomasson (ISL), Henri Hilke (FIN)

LDLC ASVEL Féminin won 159–133 on aggregate

9 January 2025
18:30

Report

Rutronik Stars Keltern (Germany)	62–56	(France) BLMA
Scoring by quarter: 12–14, 16–21, 15–12, 19–9
Pts: Lockett 20; Rebs: Muzet 5 Asts: Lockett 5		Pts: Naigre 12; Rebs: four players 6 Asts: four players 2

Speiterlinghalle, Keltern
Attendance: 300
Referees: Gintaras Vitkauskas (LTU), Anna Belousova (LAT), Michail Papaioannou (SUI)

16 January 2025
20:00

Report

BLMA (France)	63–45	(Germany) Rutronik Stars Keltern
Scoring by quarter: 19–10, 11–11, 22–11, 11–13
Pts: Angloma 17; Rebs: Bailey, Fankam 10; Asts: Suárez 6		Pts: Đorđević 9 Rebs: Turmel 6 Asts: nine players 1

Palais des Sports, Lattes
Attendance: 1,066
Referees: Nikola Bejat (NOR), Sara Månsson (SWE), Chess van Looy (BEL)

BLMA won 119–107 on aggregate

9 January 2025
20:00

Report

UFAB 49 (France)	52–64	(Turkey) Beşiktaş
Scoring by quarter: 17–9, 13–21, 8–12, 14–22
Pts: Alston 22; Rebs: Tahane 7 Asts: Méndez, Brown 3		Pts: Fagbenle 22; Rebs: Fagbenle 11; Asts: Evans 5

Salle Jean Bouin, Angers
Attendance: 1,300
Referees: Valerio Grigioni (ITA), Roberto Lucas Martínez (ESP), Josh Bowe (GBR)

16 January 2025
20:00

Report

Beşiktaş (Turkey)	66–76	(France) UFAB 49
Scoring by quarter: 20–24, 15–19, 12–10, 19–23
Pts: Evans 17; Rebs: Bayram 10; Asts: Evans 6		Pts: Ndjock 16; Rebs: Adams 8 Asts: Alston 6

BJK Akatlar Arena, Istanbul
Attendance: 600
Referees: Zoran Mitrovski (MKD), Zdravko Rutesic (MNE), Marina Shalamberidze (GEO)

Beşiktaş won 130–128 on aggregate

8 January 2025
20:30

Report

BDS Dinamo Sassari (Italy)	60–50	(Spain) IDK Euskotren
Scoring by quarter: 21–16, 13–17, 15–13, 11–4
Pts: Carangelo 19; Rebs: Gonzales, Taylor 7 Asts: Carangelo 5		Pts: Pendande 12; Rebs: Becker 5 Asts: Prieto, González 3

Palaserradimigni, Sassari
Referees: Duhan Köyici (TUR), Diana Lapanović (SLO), Nikola Perlic (CRO)

15 January 2025
20:00

Report

IDK Euskotren (Spain)	71–83	(Italy) BDS Dinamo Sassari
Scoring by quarter: 17–20, 21–29, 13–13, 20–21
Pts: Buch 13; Rebs: Pendande 8 Asts: Buch, González 4		Pts: Taylor 27; Rebs: Toffolo 10; Asts: Carangelo 10

José Antonio Gasca, San Sebastián
Attendance: 400
Referees: Petr Hrůša (CZE), Bogna Podkowińska (POL), Gavin Williams (GBR)

BDS Dinamo Sassari won 143–121 on aggregate

== Quarterfinals ==
=== Summary ===
The first legs were played on 20 February, and the second legs were played on 27 February 2025.

Team 1	Agg.	Team 2	1st leg	2nd leg
BDS Dinamo Sassari (Italy)	146–184	(Spain) Baxi Ferrol	76–95	70–89
Beşiktaş (Turkey)	153–172	(France) ESB Villeneuve-d'Ascq	72–91	81–81
BLMA (France)	123–138	(Hungary) Sopron Basket	54–81	69–57
LDLC ASVEL Féminin (France)	144–128	(Spain) Spar Girona	72–77	72–51

==== Matches ====
20 February 2025
20:30

Report

BDS Dinamo Sassari (Italy)	76–95	(Spain) Baxi Ferrol
Scoring by quarter: 16–14, 22–20, 19–23, 19–38
Pts: Gonzales 22; Rebs: Carangelo, Toffolo 6 Asts: Taylor 6		Pts: Morro 22; Rebs: Mestres 8 Asts: Joiner 6

Palaserradimigni, Sassari
Attendance: 619
Referees: Özlem Yalman (TUR), Ivana Ivanovic (SRB), Nataša Dragojević (MNE)

27 February 2025
20:00

Report

Baxi Ferrol (Spain)	89–70	(Italy) BDS Dinamo Sassari
Scoring by quarter: 22–23, 14–24, 28–12, 25–11
Pts: Mataix 19; Rebs: Melia 8 Asts: Mataix 8		Pts: Taylor 26; Rebs: Gonzales 6 Asts: Carangelo 7

Polideportivo A Malata, Ferrol
Attendance: 3,598
Referees: Çisil Güngor (TUR), Nikola Bejat (NOR), Ventsislav Velikov (BUL)

Baxi Ferrol won 184–146 on aggregate

20 February 2025
20:00

Report

Beşiktaş (Turkey)	72–91	(France) ESB Villeneuve-d'Ascq
Scoring by quarter: 19–23, 14–23, 19–29, 20–16
Pts: Winterburn 20; Rebs: Bayram 12; Asts: Peterson, Krajišnik 5		Pts: Leite 28; Rebs: Gueye 11; Asts: Leite 8

BJK Akatlar Arena, Istanbul
Attendance: 300
Referees: Jelena Tomic (CRO), Peter Zenis (SVK), Nikolaos Tziopanos (GRE)

27 February 2025
20:00

Report

ESB Villeneuve-d'Ascq (France)	81–81	(Turkey) Beşiktaş
Scoring by quarter: 18–30, 27–21, 19–22, 17–8
Pts: Zellous 19; Rebs: Zellous, Gueye 6 Asts: Zellous, Hériaud 4		Pts: Peterson 25; Rebs: Krajišnik 12; Asts: Peterson 8

Le Palacium, Villeneuve-d'Ascq
Attendance: 2,200
Referees: Ariadna Chueca (ESP), Veronika Obertová (SVK), Alessandro Perciavalle (ITA)

ESB Villeneuve-d'Ascq won 172–153 on aggregate

20 February 2025
18:30

Report

Sopron Basket (Hungary)	81–54	(France) BLMA
Scoring by quarter: 18–13, 27–16, 15–9, 21–16
Pts: Friškovec 19; Rebs: Brooks 9 Asts: Reid 12		Pts: Bailey 18; Rebs: Bailey 9 Asts: Bernies, Milapie 3

Aréna Sopron, Sopron
Attendance: 900
Referees: Nemanja Ninkovic (SRB), Esperanza Mendoza (ESP), Zoran Mitrovski (MKD)

27 February 2025
20:00

Report

BLMA (France)	69–57	(Hungary) Sopron Basket
Scoring by quarter: 14–11, 9–21, 19–13, 27–12
Pts: Limouzin 15; Rebs: Bailey 10; Asts: Bernies 10		Pts: Monroe 18; Rebs: Monroe, Brooks 10; Asts: Reid 10

Palais des Sports, Lattes
Attendance: 1,208
Referees: Lukasz Jankowski (POL), Zdravko Rutesic (MNE), Rainis Värv (EST)

Sopron Basket won 138–123 on aggregate

20 February 2025
19:30

Report

Spar Girona (Spain)	77–72	(France) LDLC ASVEL Féminin
Scoring by quarter: 20–14, 25–16, 15–27, 17–15
Pts: Mack 21; Rebs: Mack 13; Asts: Ygueravide 8		Pts: Malonga 23; Rebs: Malonga 10; Asts: Quevedo 4

Pavelló Girona-Fontajau, Girona
Attendance: 3,184
Referees: Gintaras Vitkauskas (LTU), Çisil Güngör (TUR), Viktor Nagy (HUN)

27 February 2025
20:00

Report

LDLC ASVEL Féminin (France)	72–51	(Spain) Spar Girona
Scoring by quarter: 22–16, 18–10, 15–10, 17–15
Pts: Malonga 18; Rebs: Malonga 14; Asts: Harris 5		Pts: Bibby 14; Rebs: Mack 10; Asts: Lundquist 5

Palais des Sports Gerland, Lyon
Attendance: 2,103
Referees: Özlem Yalman (TUR), Elvis Binders-Coders (LAT), Mehmet Sahin (TUR)

LDLC ASVEL Féminin won 144–128 on aggregate

== Semifinals ==
=== Summary ===
The first legs were played on 6 March, and the second legs were played on 13 March 2025.

Team 1	Agg.	Team 2	1st leg	2nd leg
ESB Villeneuve-d'Ascq (France)	127–112	(Hungary) Sopron Basket	73–66	54–46
LDLC ASVEL Féminin (France)	136–156	(Spain) Baxi Ferrol	62–93	74–63

==== Matches ====
6 March 2025
18:30

Report

Sopron Basket (Hungary)	66–73	(France) ESB Villeneuve-d'Ascq
Scoring by quarter: 21–15, 13–18, 19–19, 13–21
Pts: Brooks 18; Rebs: Böröndy 7 Asts: Böröndy 5		Pts: Zellous 17; Rebs: Gueye 8 Asts: Leite 6

Aréna Sopron, Sopron
Attendance: 1,200
Referees: Paulina Karolina Gajdosz (POL), Çisil Güngör (TUR), Branimir Galić (CRO)

13 March 2025
20:00

Report

ESB Villeneuve-d'Ascq (France)	54–46	(Hungary) Sopron Basket
Scoring by quarter: 8–15, 16–6, 14–11, 16–14
Pts: Leite 15; Rebs: Gueye 12; Asts: Leite, Zellous 4		Pts: Reid 11; Rebs: Monroe 9 Asts: Papp, Friškovec 3

Le Palacium, Villeneuve-d'Ascq
Attendance: 2,200
Referees: Özlem Yalman (TUR), Alin Faur (ROU), Jan Baloun (CZE)

ESB Villeneuve-d'Ascq won 127–112 on aggregate

6 March 2025
20:00

Report

Baxi Ferrol (Spain)	93–62	(France) LDLC ASVEL Féminin
Scoring by quarter: 24–19, 25–11, 23–16, 21–16
Pts: Melia 27; Rebs: Mataix 7 Asts: Mataix 6		Pts: Malonga 17; Rebs: Quevedo, Malonga 7 Asts: Risacher 3

Polideportivo A Malata, Ferrol
Attendance: 3,598
Referees: Silvia Marziali (ITA), Ivana Ivanovic (SRB), Nikolaos Tziopanos (GRE)

13 March 2025
20:00

Report

LDLC ASVEL Féminin (France)	74–63	(Spain) Baxi Ferrol
Scoring by quarter: 20–22, 14–6, 27–20, 13–15
Pts: Quevedo 23; Rebs: Malonga 18; Asts: three players 3		Pts: Millán, Melia 13; Rebs: Pospíšilová 11; Asts: Pospíšilová 5

Gymnase Mado Bonnet, Lyon
Attendance: 1,150
Referees: Jelena Tomić (CRO), Viola Györgyi (NOR), Veronika Obértová (SVK)

Baxi Ferrol won 156–136 on aggregate

== Final ==
=== Summary ===
The first leg was played on 26 March, and the second leg was played on 2 April 2025.

Team 1	Agg.	Team 2	1st leg	2nd leg
Baxi Ferrol (Spain)	145–162	(France) ESB Villeneuve-d'Ascq	75–78	70–84

==== Matches ====
26 March 2025
20:00

Report

Baxi Ferrol (Spain)	75–78	(France) ESB Villeneuve-d'Ascq
Scoring by quarter: 25–33, 19–9, 16–21, 15–15
Pts: Mataix 17; Rebs: three players 4 Asts: Mataix 7		Pts: Leite 25; Rebs: Gueye 12; Asts: three players 5

Polideportivo A Malata, Ferrol
Attendance: 3,766
Referees: Michał Proc (POL), Çisil Güngör (TUR), Zdenko Tomasović (SVK)

2 April 2025
20:30

Report

ESB Villeneuve-d'Ascq (France)	84–70	(Spain) Baxi Ferrol
Scoring by quarter: 23–18, 19–12, 24–20, 18–20
Pts: Zellous 23; Rebs: Peters, Paget 5 Asts: Leite 7		Pts: Pospíšilová 19; Rebs: three players 5 Asts: Mataix 8

Le Palacium, Villeneuve-d'Ascq
Attendance: 2,200
Referees: Kerem Baki (TUR), Silvia Marziali (ITA), Petar Pešić (SRB)

ESB Villeneuve-d'Ascq won 162–145 on aggregate

== See also ==
- 2024–25 EuroLeague Women
- 2024–25 EuroLeague Women regular season
- 2024–25 EuroLeague Women qualification round
- 2024–25 EuroCup Women
- 2024 FIBA Europe SuperCup Women
- 2024–25 EuroCup Basketball
