= Eliška Joklová =

Czech basketball player (born 2001)

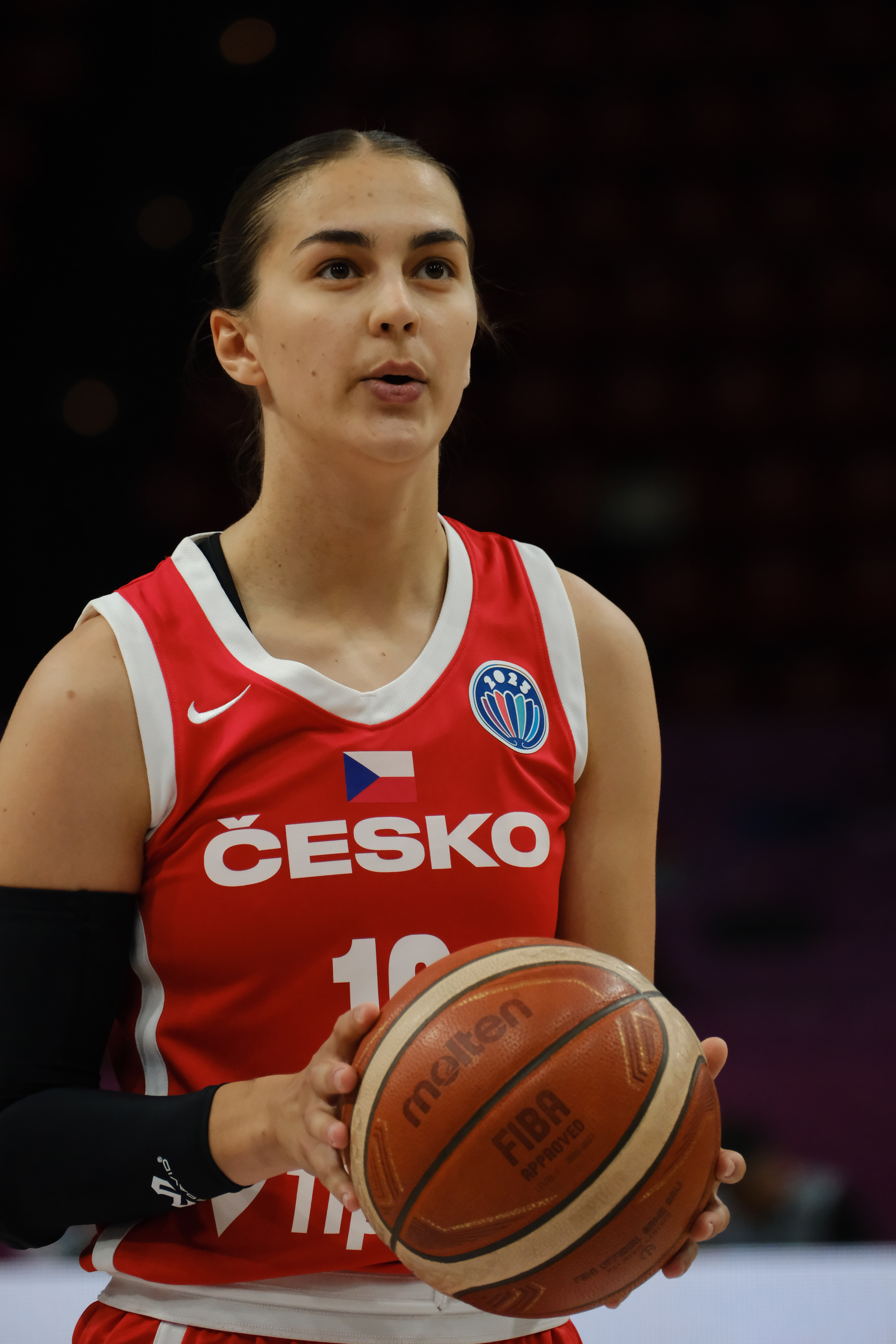
- Joklová in 2025

Žabiny Brno
- Position: Guard
- League: Czech Women's Basketball League

Personal information
- Born: 1 October 2001 (age 25) Brno, Czech Republic
- Listed height: 6 ft 0 in (1.83 m)
- Listed weight: 162 lb (73 kg)

Career information
- Playing career: 2022–present

Career history
- 2022–2026: Žabiny Brno
- 2026: Minnesota Lynx
- 2026–: Žabiny Brno
- Stats at WNBA.com
- Stats at Basketball Reference

Eliška Joklová (born Hamzová; 1 October 2001) is a Czech professional basketball player who plays for Žabiny Brno of the Czech Women's Basketball League. Joklová previously played for the Minnesota Lynx of the Women's National Basketball Association (WNBA).

== Professional career ==
=== Žabiny Brno ===
Joklová began her career with Žabiny Brno, where she's competed in the ZBL, EuroCup, and EuroLeague. On 11 October 2024, fans voted Joklová 2024–25 EuroLeague Women player of the week after she scored 17 points, 8 assists, and 5 rebounds against Olympiacos.

In September 2026, Joklová returned to Žabiny Brno.

=== Minnesota Lynx ===
On 12 April 2026, Joklová signed a training camp contract with the Minnesota Lynx of the WNBA. She made the team's opening day roster. Joklová made her WNBA debut on 12 May against the Phoenix Mercury and recorded two points and one rebound in five minutes. Joklová and her teammate Emma Čechová became the first Czech women to play in the WNBA since Jana Veselá in 2010.

Joklová was waived by the Lynx on 25 May. Three days later, she signed a player development contract with the Lynx. On 10 July, she signed her first seven-day contract with the Lynx. On 13 July, against the Mercury, she scored a career-high eight points in nine minutes. On 17 July, she signed another seven-day contract with the Lynx. After being released on 24 July, Joklová signed her third seven-day contract with the Lynx on 26 July. On 2 August, Joklová signed a rest-of-season hardship contract with the Lynx. The Lynx waived Joklová and signed guard Aari McDonald on 7 September.

== National team career ==
Joklová represented the Czech Republic at the 2025 and 2023 FIBA Women’s EuroBasket tournaments and the 2026 FIBA World Cup Qualifying Tournament. At the FIBA Women's World Cup in September 2026, Joklová led the Czech team in points (14.7 ppg) and efficiency (15.7 epg).

== Personal life ==
Joklová was born as Eliška Hamzová in Brno. Her mother, Romana Hamzová, is a former basketball player who represented the Czech Republic at the 2004 Summer Olympics. Her father, Jiří Hamza, is the chairman of the Czech biathlon association. She has three siblings, Jiří, Maria, and Josef. Her sister, Maria, also played basketball for Žabiny. Her brother, Jiří, plays football for FK Pardubice.

She started using her husband's last name, Joklová, on 2 August 2026.
