= Helena Pueyo =

Spanish basketball player (born 2001)

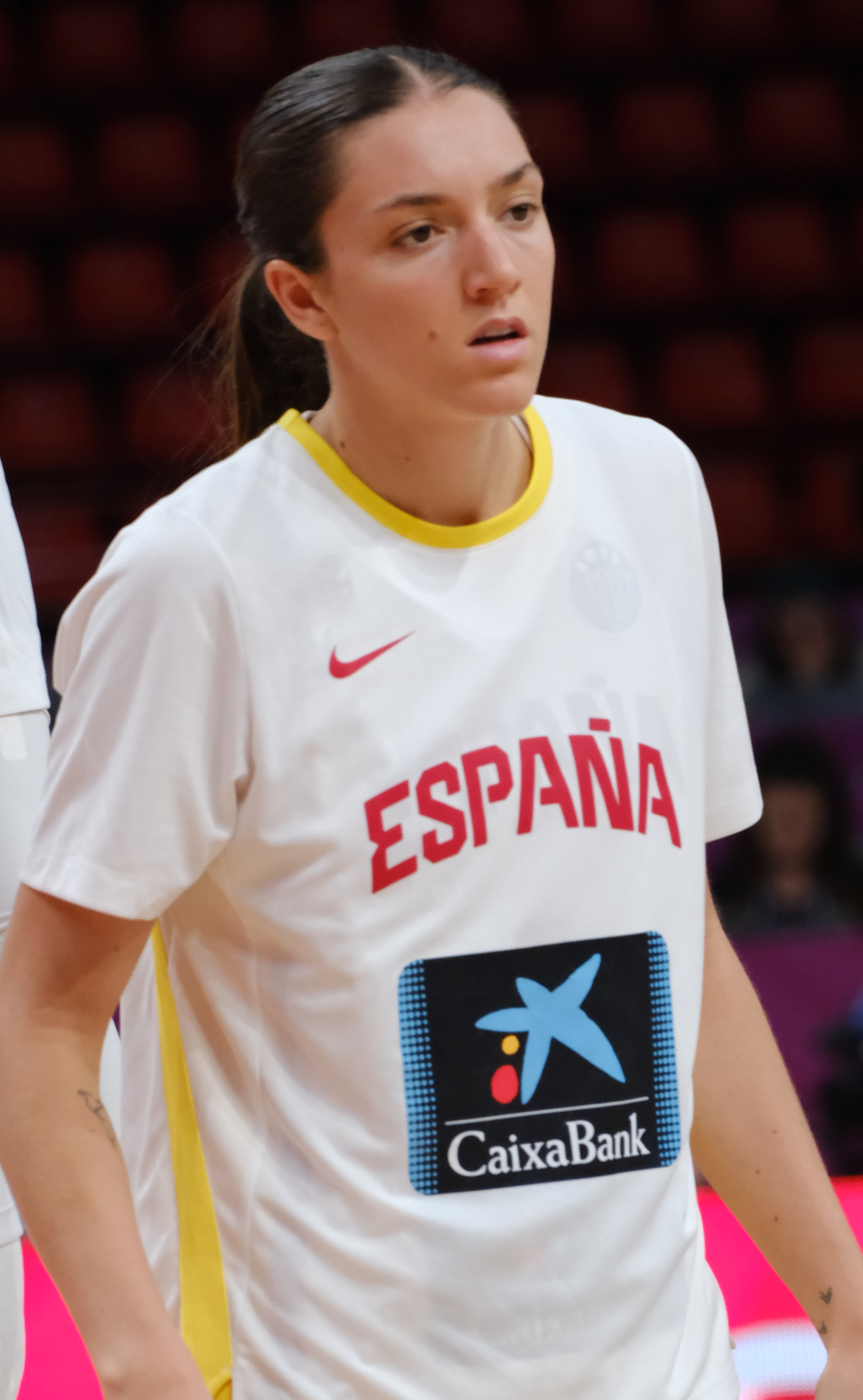
- Pueyo in 2025

No. 6 – Basket Zaragoza
- Position: Guard
- League: Liga Femenina de Baloncesto

Personal information
- Born: 13 February 2001 (age 25) Palma de Mallorca, Spain
- Listed height: 6 ft 0 in (1.83 m)

Career information
- College: Arizona (2019–2024)
- WNBA draft: 2024: 2nd round, 22nd overall pick
- Drafted by: Connecticut Sun
- Playing career: 2024–present

Career history
- 2024–present: Basket Zaragoza

Career highlights
- All-Pac-12 Team (2024); 2× Pac-12 All-Defensive Team (2023, 2024)
- Stats at WNBA.com
- Stats at Basketball Reference
Medals
Women's basketball
Representing Spain
World Cup
Bronze medal – third place	2026 Germany
EuroBasket
Silver medal – second place	2025 Czech Republic/Germany/Italy/Greece
U-19 World Cup
Bronze medal – third place	2019 Thailand U19
U18 Eurobasket
Silver medal – second place	2018 EuroBasket U18

Helena Pueyo

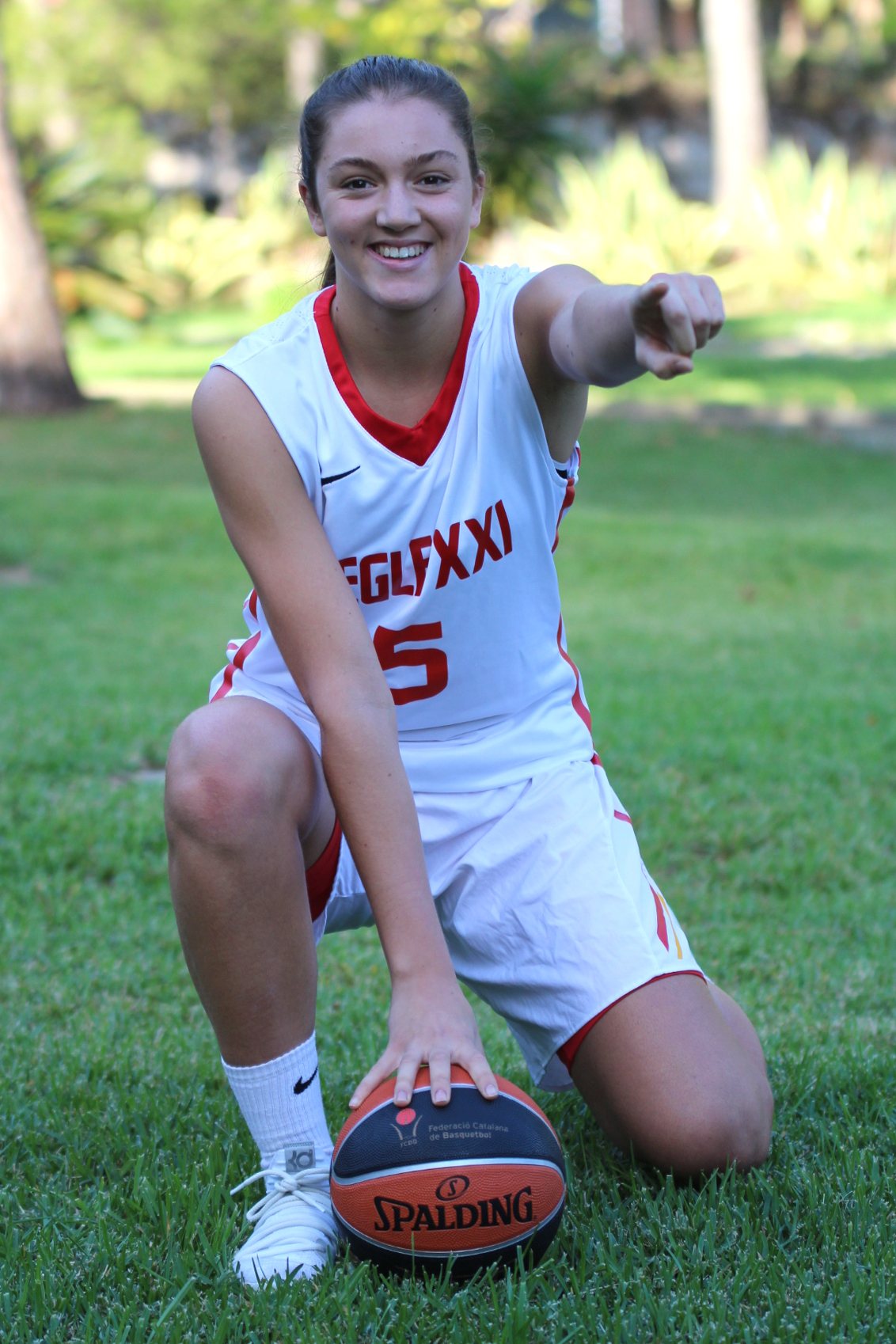
Pueyo in Segle XXI uniform in 2017

Helena Pueyo Melchor (born 13 February 2001) is a Spanish professional basketball player for Basket Zaragoza of the Liga Femenina de Baloncesto. She is also a player for the Spanish women's national team. She played college basketball for the Arizona Wildcats.

== Early life ==
Pueyo was born in Palma on the island of Mallorca, Spain. She has a brother in Spain.

She attended and trained at La Salle Palma. She played in the Spanish National Team as well as Liga Femenina 2 club Segle XXI before coming to the United States to play college basketball.

She has a Bachelor's degree in nutritional science and a Master's degree in public health.

== College career ==
Pueyo was recruited for "her size, shooting ability, the way she sees the floor and her versatility," according to Arizona coach Adia Barnes. At the time, she was considered one of the best European players in her age group.

During her freshman year in the 2019–2020 season, Pueyo played in 29 games and started in one. She average 21.6 minutes of playtime per game. She had the second-most three-pointers on the team with 41 total scored. She had a 38% shot rate from three (41–107) and was the team's fifth-leading scorer averaging 6.7 points per game. She had a career-high eight assists in the Pac-12 Tournament Quarterfinals against Cal, which is also an Arizona Pac-12 Tournament record. Pueyo was named Pac-12 All-Freshman Honorable Mention.

In her sophomore season in 2020–2021, she played in 26 games and was third on the team in steals.

In the 2021–2022 season, she was considered Arizona's top reserve, playing in all 29 games and starting in 4. She averaged 21.5 minutes of playtime per game, with an average of 2.4 assists and 1.7 steals. She was named Pac-12 All Defensive Team Honorable Mention.

During her senior season of 2022–2023, Pueyo was named on the Pac-12 All-Defensive Team as well as on the Naismith Defensive Player of the Year Midseason Watchlist. She played in all 32 season games and started in six. She had an average of 2.3 steals per game, the best on the Arizona team and second-best in Pac-12 that season. She also led the team with 21 blocks and a 2.6 assist-to-turnover rate.

In her last season, 2023–2024, she was named All-Pac-12 Team as well as Pac-12 All-Defensive Team. She is the program record holder for career steals, and fifth in Pac-12 history with 312 total steals. She is also the program record holder for single-season steals with 110, fourth in Pac-12 history. She is the first Pac-12 player since 2018 to have 100+ steals in a single season.

== Professional career ==
She played for Segle XXI in Spain's Liga Femenina 2 in from 2017 to 2019. She averaged 13 points, three assists, and two steals per game. Her scoring rates were 51% from the field, 37% for three-pointers, and 85% from the free throw line.

Pueyo was selected in the second round, as the 22nd overall draft pick of the 2024 WNBA draft by the Connecticut Sun. She is the 12th Spanish player and the 13th Arizona player to be drafted into the WNBA. Coach Stephanie White describes Pueyo as "a player who makes winning plays. Her assist-to-turnover ratio is excellent, and with low usage... she is a player who can move the ball on offense and who can defend on the other site of the court." On 10 May 2024, Pueyo was waived by the Connecticut Sun.

She signed with Basket Zaragoza of the Spanish Liga ACB on 7 May 2024.

== National team career ==
In 2017, Pueyo played in the 2017 U16 European Championships, guiding Spain to the quarterfinals while averaging 11 points, five rebounds, and four assists per game. She averaged 28 minutes of playtime.

In the summer of 2018, she helped lead Spain to a silver medal at the 2018 U18 European Championships, while averaging eight points and four rebounds per game. At the 2018 U17 World Cup, she played 23 minutes per game and average nine points, four rebounds, and over two assists per game, helping Spain reach the quarterfinals.

In 2019, she helped lead Spain to a bronze medal at the 2019 U19 World Cup and a Quarterfinal appearance at the 2019 U18 European Championships. She average 9.4 points, 5.5 rebounds, 2.7 steals, 2.6 assists in the summer of 2019.

== Career statistics ==
Legend
GP	Games played	GS	Games started	MPG	Minutes per game	RPG	Rebounds per game
APG	Assists per game	SPG	Steals per game	BPG	Blocks per game	PPG	Points per game
TO	Turnovers per game	FG%	Field-goal percentage	3P%	3-point field-goal percentage	FT%	Free-throw percentage
**Bold**	Career best	°	League leader

=== College ===
Year	Team	GP	GS	MPG	FG%	3P%	FT%	RPG	APG	SPG	BPG	TO	PPG
2019–20	Arizona	29	1	21.6	39.1	**38.3**	77.3	2.7	1.9	1.4	0.3	1.3	6.7
2020–21	Arizona	26	0	21.5	32.3	34.3	75.0	3.5	1.3	1.5	0.5	0.8	3.7
2021–22	Arizona	29	4	21.5	39.1	36.4	85.7	1.9	2.4	1.7	0.6	0.8	3.4
2022–23	Arizona	32	6	25.1	**50.8**	31.4	85.7	2.9	2.7	2.3	0.7	1.0	5.3
2023–24	Arizona	**34**	**34**	**36.8**	48.0	37.5	81.1	**3.7**	**3.6**	**3.2**	**0.9**	1.5	**9.7**
**Career**		150	45	25.8	43.4	36.2	81.1	3.0	2.4	2.1	0.6	1.1	5.9
Statistics retrieved from Sports-Reference.
