= Khaalia Hillsman =

American basketball player (born 1996)

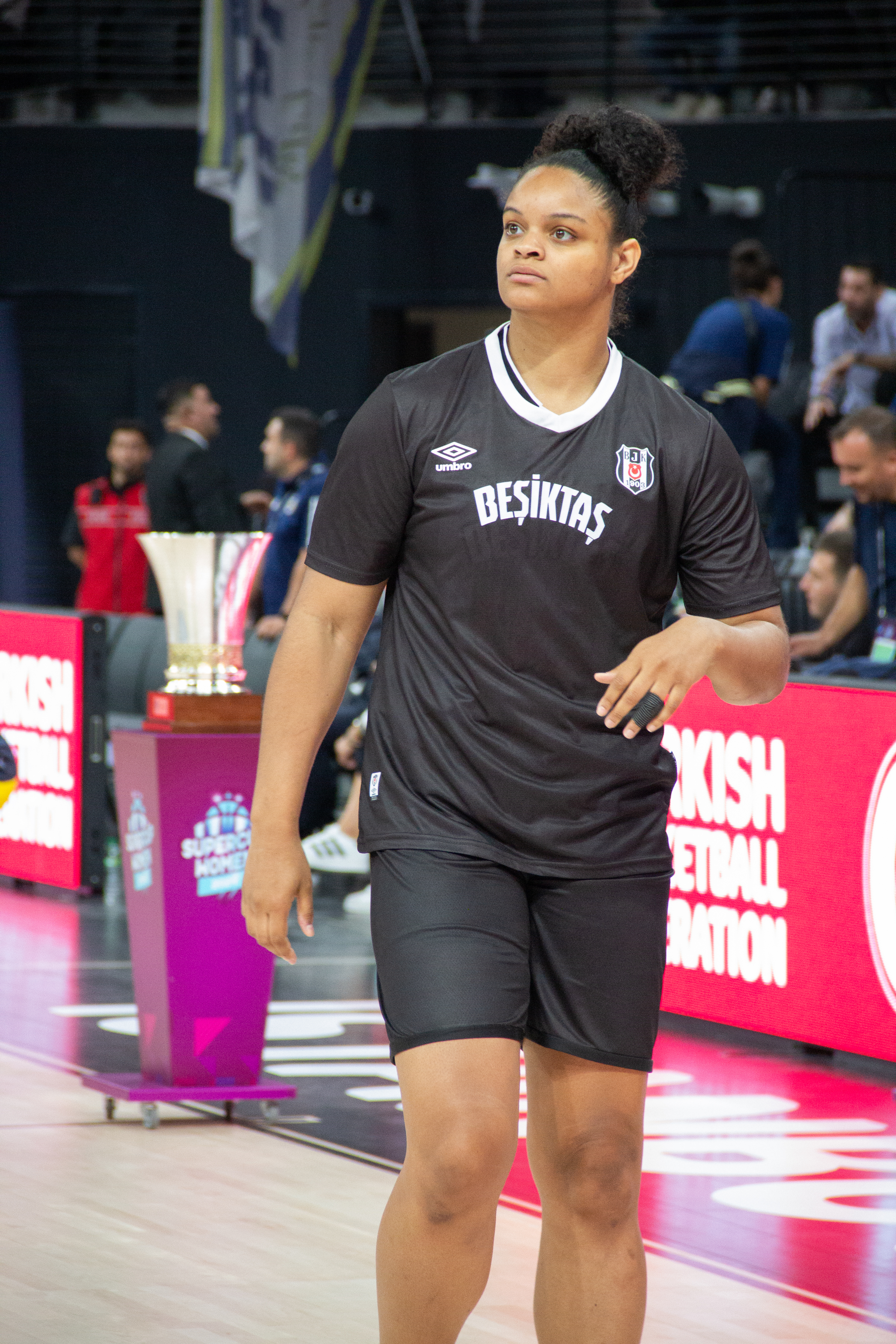

Personal information
- Born: August 1, 1996 (age 30) North Carolina, U.S.
- Listed height: 6 ft 5 in (1.96 m)

Career information
- High school: Whitney M. Young Magnet High School (Chicago, Illinois)
- College: Texas A&M (2014–2018)
- WNBA draft: 2018: undrafted
- Playing career: 2018–present
- Position: Center
- Number: 00

Career history
- 2018-2019: AZS Poznań
- 2019-2020: Maccabi Haifa
- 2020-2021: Maccabi Ramat Gan
- 2021-2022: Dynamo Moscow
- 2022: Fuerza Regia Femenil
- 2022: TFSE-MTK Budapest
- 2022-2023: Antalya 07 Basketbol
- 2023: Chicago Sky
- 2023-2024: İzmit Belediyespor
- 2024-2025: Beşiktaş
- 2025: Crvena zvezda

Career highlights
- 2x All-SEC Second Team (2017, 2018)
- Stats at Basketball Reference

Khaalia Hillsman (born August 1, 1996) is an American-born naturalized Bulgarian professional basketball player who is a free agent. She played college basketball at Texas A&M. Hillsman is the daughter of former NBA player Benoit Benjamin.

== College career ==
Hillsman came out of high school as the 47th overall rated recruit per ESPN HoopGurlz's rankings. Hillsman committed to play for the Texas A&M Aggies, citing that she chose the Aggies because "I love the atmosphere, the team, the coaches, and the campus... also thought it would be a good fit with all the success assistant coach Bob Starkey has had with his post players."

During her four years at A&M, Hillsman finished in the Top 10 all-time in scoring and rebounds. She was named to the All-SEC Second Team twice - 2017 and 2018 - and helped lead the Aggies to the Sweet 16 in 2018.

== College statistics ==
Year	Team	GP	Points	FG%	3P%	FT%	RPG	APG	SPG	BPG	PPG
2014–15	Texas A&M	31	165	.544	.000	.569	5.0	0.2	0.2	0.5	5.3
2015–16	Texas A&M	32	234	.550	.000	.591	5.3	0.2	0.5	1.1	7.3
2016–17	Texas A&M	34	556	.624	.000	.790	8.2	0.9	0.6	1.2	16.4
2017–18	Texas A&M	36	517	.602	.000	.755	7.7	0.5	0.4	1.6	14.4
Career		133	1472	.593	.000	.721	6.6	0.5	0.4	1.1	11.1

== WNBA career ==
Hillsman went undrafted in the 2018 WNBA draft. She signed a training camp contract with the Seattle Storm on April 18, 2018. Hillsman did not make the roster for the Storm, getting cut on May 16, 2018.

Hillsman's next chance in the WNBA came in 2022, as she signed another training camp contract - this time with the Atlanta Dream. Hillsman did not make the Dream roster.

Hillsman signed another training camp contract in 2023 with the Connecticut Sun. Hillsman, once again, did not make the final roster - getting waived on May 3, 2023.

=== Chicago Sky ===
In June 2023, Hillsman signed a Hardship Contract with the Chicago Sky, after they had numerous injuries causing them to fall below 10 available players. Hillsman made her WNBA debut on June 9, 2023, when the Sky faced the Los Angeles Sparks - recording 1 minute of play. Hillsman played in 1 game for the Sky, before being released from the hardship contract on June 17, 2023.

== WNBA career statistics ==
Legend
GP	Games played	GS	Games started	MPG	Minutes per game	RPG	Rebounds per game
APG	Assists per game	SPG	Steals per game	BPG	Blocks per game	PPG	Points per game
TO	Turnovers per game	FG%	Field-goal percentage	3P%	3-point field-goal percentage	FT%	Free-throw percentage
**Bold**	Career best	°	League leader

=== Regular season ===
Year	Team	GP	GS	MPG	FG%	3P%	FT%	RPG	APG	SPG	BPG	TO	PPG
2023	Chicago	1	0	1.0	—	—	—	0.0	0.0	0.0	0.0	0.0	0.0
Career	1 year, 1 team	1	0	1.0	—	—	—	0.0	0.0	0.0	0.0	0.0	0.0
