= 2022–23 Galatasaray S.K. (women's basketball) season =

Turkish basketball team season

Galatasaray Çağdaş Faktoring
2022–23 season
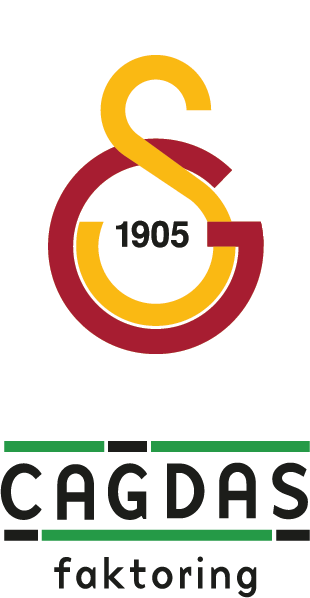
- President: Dursun Özbek
- Head coach: Alper Durur
- Arena: Başakşehir Spor Kompleksi (until 7 January 2023); Ahmet Cömert Sport Hall (from 11 January 2023)
- Women's Basketball Super League: 3rd seed
- Playoffs: Semifinals
- EuroCup Women: Runners-up
- Turkish Women's Basketball Cup: Suspended

The 2022–23 season is Galatasaray's 68th season in the existence of the club. The team plays in the Women's Basketball Super League and in the EuroCup Women.

== Overview ==
=== April ===
- On 27 April 2022, it was announced that Efe Güven, who has been working as Galatasaray Women's Basketball coach since 2018, parted ways.

=== July ===
- On 7 July 2022, it was announced that a one-year agreement was reached with Alper Durur for the position of coaching the Galatasaray Women's Basketball Team.
- In the announcement made on 14 July 2022, Galatasaray in the European cups will take part in the FIBA EuroCup Women in the 2022–23 season.
- It has been reported that the cruciate ligaments of Sude Yılmaz, who was injured in the first quarter of the U20 Europa League semi-final match played between Turkey and Slovenia on 16 July 2022, without being hit while defending, were more likely to rupture.
- Müge Erdem was appointed as the General Manager of Women's Basketball on 21 July 2022.
- In the information given on 22 July 2022, it was announced that Sude Yılmaz, who was injured in the national match and had ruptured the anterior cruciate ligament of the right knee, had a successful operation and closed the season.

=== August ===
- The fixture of the 2022–23 season of the Women's Basketball Super League was determined with the drawing of lots held on 31 August 2022 at Sinan Erdem Dome.

=== September ===
- In the notification made on 19 September 2022, it was announced that Çağdaş Faktoring is the name sponsor of our Galatasaray Women's Basketball Team.
- At the press conference held at Ali Sami Yen Sports Complex on 21 September 2022, a naming sponsorship agreement was signed with Çağdaş Faktoring.

=== February ===
- The Turkish Women's Basketball Super League has been named after the national basketball player Nilay Aydoğan, who died during the 2023 Kahramanmaraş earthquakes starting from the 19th week of the season.

=== June ===
- On 3 June 2023, Galatasaray Women's Basketball Team captain Işıl Alben announced that she had ended her professional basketball career.

== Sponsorship and kit manufacturers ==
- Supplier: Umbro
- Name sponsor: Çağdaş Faktoring
- Main sponsor: Çağdaş Faktoring
- Back sponsor: —
- Sleeve sponsor: —
- Lateral sponsor: GAMI
- Short sponsor: HDI Sigorta, Tunç Holding
- Socks sponsor: —

== Team ==
=== Players ===
Galatasaray roster
Players
Coaches

Pos.	No.	Nat.	Name	Ht.	Wt.	Age
G/F	1	(Lithuania)	Nacickaitė, Kamilė	1.80 m (5 ft 11 in)		36 – 28 December 1989
PF	2	(Turkey)	Tokmak, Simge	1.84 m (6 ft 0 in)		23 – 23 January 2003
PG	4	(Turkey)	Akbaş, Büşra	1.74 m (5 ft 9 in)		31 – 8 March 1995
PG	5	(United States) (Russia)	Prince, Epiphanny	1.75 m (5 ft 9 in)	81 kg (179 lb)	38 – 11 January 1988
PF	6	(Turkey)	Balotu, Miray	1.83 m (6 ft 0 in)		25 – 8 April 2001
PG	7	(Turkey)	Uygül, Merve	1.70 m (5 ft 7 in)		38 – 30 September 1988
SF	8	(Turkey)	Yılmaz, Sude (injured)	1.82 m (6 ft 0 in)		24 – 15 March 2002
G	9	(Turkey)	Bilgiç, Pelin	1.73 m (5 ft 8 in)		32 – 15 July 1994
PG	10	(Turkey)	Alben, Işıl (C)	1.72 m (5 ft 8 in)	60 kg (132 lb)	40 – 22 February 1986
PF	11	(Latvia)	Putniņa, Aija	1.91 m (6 ft 3 in)	82 kg (181 lb)	38 – 15 January 1988
SG	12	(Latvia)	Pulvere, Ieva	1.73 m (5 ft 8 in)	69 kg (152 lb)	36 – 22 July 1990
C	13	(Turkey)	Tanaçan, Devran	1.96 m (6 ft 5 in)	90 kg (198 lb)	39 – 17 November 1986
C	15	(United States) (Turkey)	McCowan, Teaira	2.01 m (6 ft 7 in)	108 kg (238 lb)	30 – 28 September 1996
F	23	(Turkey)	Yıldızhan, Meltem	1.88 m (6 ft 2 in)		27 – 5 August 1999
F/C	30	(United States)	Stevens, Azurá	1.98 m (6 ft 6 in)	82 kg (181 lb)	30 – 1 February 1996
F	72	(Turkey)	Canıtez, Tuğçe	1.91 m (6 ft 3 in)	85 kg (187 lb)	35 – 10 November 1990

Head coach

- (Turkey) Alper Durur

Assistant coach(es)

- (Turkey) Batuhan Atiktürk
- (Turkey) Emre Beşer
- (Turkey) Can Alyüz

Athletic trainer(s)

- (Turkey) Süleyman Görgülü

Legend

- (C) Team captain
- (DC) Dual citizenship
- Injured

- Roster
Updated: 26 March 2023

=== Depth chart ===
Pos.	Starting 5	Bench 1	Bench 2	Inactive
C	Teaira McCowan	Aija Putniņa	Devran Tanaçan
PF	Azurá Stevens	Tuğçe Canıtez	Miray Balotu	Simge Tokmak
SF	Kamilė Nacickaitė	Meltem Yıldızhan		Sude Yılmaz (injured)
SG	Epiphanny Prince	Ieva Pulvere
PG	Işıl Alben	Pelin Bilgiç	Büşra Akbaş	Merve Uygül

=== Squad changes ===
==== In ====
No.	Pos.	Nat.	Name	Age	Moving from		Type	Ends	Transfer fee	Date	Source
10	PG	(Turkey)	Işıl Alben	36	Botaş	(Turkey)	1 years	June 2023	Free	8 July 2022	
15	C	(United States)	Teaira McCowan	25	Ormanspor	(Turkey)	1 years	June 2023	Free	1 August 2022	
30	F/C	(United States)	Azurá Stevens	26	Chicago Sky	(United States)	1 years	June 2023	Free	3 August 2022	
23	PF	(Turkey)	Meltem Yıldızhan	22	Nesibe Aydın	(Turkey)	1 years	June 2023	Loan return	4 August 2022	
11	PF	(Latvia)	Aija Putniņa	34	Botaş	(Turkey)	1 years	June 2023	Free	5 August 2022	
7	PG	(Turkey)	Merve Uygül	32	Nesibe Aydın	(Turkey)	1 years	June 2023	Free	8 August 2022	
13	C	(Turkey)	Devran Tanaçan	35	GISA Lions SV Halle	(Germany)	1 years	June 2023	Free	8 August 2022	
1	G/F	(Lithuania)	Kamilė Nacickaitė	32	Nesibe Aydın	(Turkey)	1 years	June 2023	Free	11 August 2022	
12	SG	(Latvia)	Ieva Pulvere	32	Nesibe Aydın	(Turkey)	1 years	June 2023	Free	12 August 2022	
41	C	(United States)	Alaina Coates	27	Indiana Fever	(United States)	2 months	December 2022	Free	5 October 2022	
72	F	(Turkey)	Tuğçe Canıtez	32	Hatay Büyükşehir Belediyespor	(Turkey)	6 months	June 2023	Free	28 November 2022	
5	PG	(United States)	Epiphanny Prince	34	Hatay Büyükşehir Belediyespor	(Turkey)	6 months	June 2023	Free	31 December 2022	
4	PG	(Turkey)	Büşra Akbaş	27	Hatay Büyükşehir Belediyespor	(Turkey)	3 months	June 2023	Free	28 February 2023	

==== Out ====
No.	Pos.	Nat.	Name	Age	Moving to		Type	Transfer fee	Date	Source
3	SF	(United States)	Kaela Davis	27	Chicago Sky	(United States)	End of contract	Free	6 May 2022	
15	PF	(Serbia)	Tina Krajišnik	31	Chicago Sky	(United States)	End of contract	Free	6 May 2022	
30	PF	(United States)	Shante Evans	30	Basket 25 Bydgoszcz	(Poland)	End of contract	Free	1 June 2022	
12	C	(Latvia)	Anete Šteinberga	32	Tango Bourges Basket	(France)	End of contract	Free	16 June 2022	
23	PG	(Turkey)	Merve Aydın	28	Fenerbahçe Safiport	(Turkey)	End of contract	Free	1 July 2022	
1	PG	(Turkey)	Eda Şahin	22	Hatayspor	(Turkey)	End of contract	Free	10 July 2022	
14	C	(Turkey)	Gizem Başaran	29	Hatayspor	(Turkey)	End of contract	Free	10 July 2022	
17	PG	(Turkey)	Gizem Yavuz	34	Emlak Konut SK	(Turkey)	End of contract	Free	18 July 2022	
7	SG	(Turkey)	Mısra Albayrak	21	Melikgazi Kayseri Basketbol	(Turkey)	End of contract	Free	28 July 2022	
5	SF	(Turkey)	Melis Gülcan	26	Botaş	(Turkey)	End of contract	Free	30 August 2022	
41	C	(United States)	Alaina Coates	27	Free agent		End of contract	Free	1 December 2022	

==== Out on loan ====
No.	Pos.	Nat.	Name	Age	Moving to		Date	Source
14	SF	(Turkey)	Arifecan Vardar	19	Edremit Belediyesi Gürespor	(Turkey)	9 December 2022	
21	PG	(Turkey)	Berna Şahin	19	Edremit Belediyesi Gürespor	(Turkey)	9 December 2022	

=== Staff and management ===
As of 10 August 2022

Name	Job
Müge Erdem	Infrastructure Administrative Coordinator
Melahat Aydın	Administrative Manager
Alper Durur	Head Coach
Batuhan Atiktürk	Assistant Coach
Emre Beşer	Assistant Coach
Can Alyüz	Assistant Coach
Süleyman Görgülü	Conditioner
Pelin Yılmaz	Physiotherapist
Zerrin Hatacıkoğlu	Masseuse
Alaaddin Akkoyun	Material Manager
Özcan Kör	Transportation

== Pre-season and friendlies ==
=== Friendly match ===
10 September 2022 Friendly Match	Galatasaray	75–52	Boğaziçi Basketbol	Istanbul
14:00
	Pts: Bilgiç, Vardar 13	Boxscore		Arena: Florya Metin Oktay Facilities

14 September 2022 Friendly Match	Emlak Konut SK	55–50	Galatasaray	Istanbul
15:00
		Boxscore	Pts: Yıldızhan, Putniņa 15; Rebs: Yıldızhan 11	Arena: Başakşehir Spor Kompleksi

17 September 2022 Friendly Match	Galatasaray	67–58	Bursa Uludağ Basketbol	Istanbul
15:00
	Pts: Alben 19	Boxscore		Arena: Florya Metin Oktay Facilities

28 September 2022 Erciyes Cup 1	Melikgazi Kayseri Basketbol	63–92	Galatasaray	Kayseri, Turkey
18:00
		Boxscore		Arena: Kadir Has Spor Salonu

29 September 2022 Erciyes Cup 2	Galatasaray	80–75	Beşiktaş	Kayseri, Turkey
16:00
		Boxscore		Arena: Kadir Has Spor Salonu

1 October 2022 Erciyes Cup 3	Galatasaray	97–75	Bursa Uludağ Basketbol	Kayseri, Turkey
14:00
		Boxscore		Arena: Kadir Has Spor Salonu

== Competitions ==
=== Overview ===
Competition	First match	Last match	Starting round	Final position	Record							
Competition	First match	Last match	Starting round	Final position	Pld	W	D	L	PF	PA	PD	Win %
Women's Basketball Super League	8 October 2022	20 April 2023	Regular season	Semifinals	31	22	0	9	2,358	2,098	+260	70.97
EuroCup Women	26 October 2022	12 April 2023	Regular season	Runnersup	16	11	0	5	1,161	1,063	+98	68.75
Turkish Women's Basketball Cup	6–7 March 2023	Suspended	Quarterfinals	Suspended	0	0	0	0	0	0	+0	—
Total					47	33	0	14	3,519	3,161	+358	70.21

Last updated: 20 April 2023
Source: Competitions

=== Women's Basketball Super League ===
==== League table ====
Pos	Team	Pld	W	L	GF	GA	GD	Pts	Qualification or relegation
1	ÇBK Mersin Yenişehir Belediyesi	26	24	2	2041	1662	+379	50	Qualification to playoffs
2	Fenerbahçe Alagöz Holding	26	23	3	2308	1629	+679	49	Qualification to playoffs
3	Galatasaray Çağdaş Faktoring	26	20	6	1991	1712	+279	46	Qualification to playoffs
4	BOTAŞ	26	18	8	1915	1673	+242	44	Qualification to playoffs
5	Emlak Konut	26	16	10	1870	1759	+111	42	Qualification to playoffs
6	Nesibe Aydın	26	15	11	1993	1816	+177	41	Qualification to playoffs
7	Beşiktaş	26	12	14	1838	1887	−49	38	Qualification to playoffs
8	Çankaya Üniversitesi	26	9	17	1852	2030	−178	35	Qualification to playoffs
9	Ormanspor	26	9	17	1859	1999	−140	35	
10	Bursa Uludağ Basketbol	26	8	18	1879	2175	−296	34	
11	Melikgazi Kayseri Basketbol	26	7	19	1780	2089	−309	33	
12	Antalya Toroslar Basketbol	26	7	19	1653	2015	−362	33	
13	Rize Belediyesi	26	6	20	1645	1923	−278	32	Relegation to TKBL
14	Tufan Metalurji Hatay Büyükşehir Belediyespor (Note: Hatay Büyükşehir Belediyespor withdrew from the league, following the 2023 Turkey–Syria earthquake, and was not relegated at the end of the season.)	26	8	18	1316	1573	−257	34	

Source: TBF

==== Results summary ====
Overall						Home					Away				
Pld	W	L	PF	PA	PD	W	L	PF	PA	PD	W	L	PF	PA	PD
26	20	6	1991	1712	+279	11	2	995	827	+168	9	4	996	885	+111

Last updated: 30 March 2023.
Source: TBF.org.tr

==== Results by round ====
Round	1	2	3	4	5	6	7	8	9	10	11	12	13	14	15	16	17	18	19	20	21	22	23	24	25	26
Ground	A	A	H	A	H	A	H	A	H	A	H	A	H	H	H	A	H	A	H	A	H	A	H	A	H	A
Result	W	W	W	W	W	W	L	L	W	L	W	W	W	W	W	W	W	W	W	L	L	L	W	W	W	W
Position	2	3	2	2	1	1	2	4	3	5	4	4	3	3	3	3	3	3	3	3	3	3	3	3	3	3

Updated to match(es) played on 30 March 2023. Source: TBF.org.tr
A = Away; H = Home; W = Win; L = Loss

==== Matches ====
Win Loss

Note: All times are TRT (UTC+3) as listed by the Turkish Basketball Federation.

8 October 2022 1	Antalya Toroslar Basketbol	49–78	Galatasaray Çağdaş Faktoring	Antalya, Turkey
13:30	Scoring by quarter: 18–27, 10–17, 9–20, 12–14
Youtube / TBF TV, Galatasaray TV	Pts: Wallace 22; Rebs: Dumlu 10; Asts: Wallace, Cora 2 PIR: Wallace 21	Boxscore; Report	Pts: Bilgiç 20; Rebs: Yıldızhan 8 Asts: Bilgiç, Pulvere 4 PIR: Bilgiç 21	Arena: Kepez Turgut Özal Spor Salonu; Referees: Alper Altuğ Köselerli, Anıl Veziroğlu, Ali Osman Kanık

15 October 2022 2	Çankaya Üniversitesi	62–76	Galatasaray Çağdaş Faktoring	Ankara, Turkey
13:00	Scoring by quarter: 21–15, 22–22, 11–23, 8–16
Youtube / TBF TV, sportstv	Pts: Harris 21; Rebs: Turner 7 Asts: White 7 PIR: Turner 21	Boxscore; Report	Pts: Nacickaitė 31; Rebs: Coates 10; Asts: Bilgiç, Alben 6 PIR: Nacickaitė 33	Arena: Ankara Arena; Referees: Orhan Çağrı Hekimoğlu, Eyyüp Ayhan, Burak Aktaş

22 October 2022 3	Galatasaray Çağdaş Faktoring	72–58	Beşiktaş	Ataköy, Bakırköy, Istanbul, Turkey
14:30	Scoring by quarter: 15–7, 18–11, 21–25, 18–15
Youtube / TBF TV, Galatasaray TV	Pts: Nacickaitė 23; Rebs: Stevens 13; Asts: Alben 11; PIR: Nacickaitė 26	Boxscore; Report	Pts: Bayram 14; Rebs: Bayram, Topuz 5 Asts: Topuz 4 PIR: Bayram 13	Arena: Sinan Erdem Dome; Referees: Özge Şentürk Bayraktar, Seda Esen, Furkan Keseratar

30 October 2022 4	Tufan Metalurji Hatay Büyükşehir Belediyespor	57–78	Galatasaray Çağdaş Faktoring	Hatay, Turkey
14:00	Scoring by quarter: 9–25, 25–14, 9–24, 14–15
Youtube / TBF TV, Galatasaray TV	Pts: Gatling 23; Rebs: Başaran 9 Asts: Prince 5 PIR: Gatling 26	Boxscore; Report	Pts: Nacickaitė 24; Rebs: Stevens 10; Asts: Alben, Bilgiç 6 PIR: Stevens 24	Arena: Antakya Sport Hall; Referees: Zafer Yılmaz, Samet Tekin, Almina Kocabaş

6 November 2022 5	Galatasaray Çağdaş Faktoring	75–70	Rize Belediyesi	Başakşehir, Istanbul, Turkey
15:00	Scoring by quarter: 15–18, 33–18, 12–12, 15–22
Youtube / TBF TV	Pts: Coates 19; Rebs: Coates 15; Asts: Nacickaitė 9 PIR: Coates 33	Boxscore; Report	Pts: Özcan 21; Rebs: Özcan, Sherrill 7 Asts: Özdemir 6 PIR: Özcan 19	Arena: Başakşehir Spor Kompleksi; Referees: Serhat Büker, Dorukhan Kalyoncu, Ali Osman Kanık

13 November 2022 6	Ormanspor	62–69	Galatasaray Çağdaş Faktoring	Ankara, Turkey
15:00	Scoring by quarter: 13–23, 16–16, 18–13, 15–17
Youtube / TBF TV	Pts: Williams 23; Rebs: Williams 10; Asts: Karakaş 7 PIR: Williams 27	Boxscore; Report	Pts: Bilgiç 19; Rebs: Coates 15; Asts: Bilgiç 6 PIR: Bilgiç 24	Arena: M. Sait Zarifoğlu Spor Salonu; Referees: Mehmet Serdar Ünal, Benhür İrcel, Haldun Çoban

19 November 2022 7	Galatasaray Çağdaş Faktoring	54–68	ÇBK Mersin Yenişehir Belediyesi	Başakşehir, Istanbul, Turkey
16:00	Scoring by quarter: 11–17, 14–19, 15–15, 14–17
Youtube / TBF TV	Pts: Putniņa 19; Rebs: Coates 8 Asts: Alben 6 PIR: Putniņa 17	Boxscore; Report	Pts: Bonner 18; Rebs: Jones 14; Asts: Yalçın 5 PIR: Jones 24	Arena: Başakşehir Spor Kompleksi; Referees: Alper Özgök, Uğur Özen, Metehan Alaçam

1 December 2022 8	Fenerbahçe Alagöz Holding	80–72	Galatasaray Çağdaş Faktoring	Istanbul, Turkey
19:00	Scoring by quarter: 28–16, 14–13, 14–15, 24–28
Youtube / TBF TV, sportstv	Pts: McBride 20; Rebs: McBride 7 Asts: Çakır 7 PIR: Meesseman 24	Boxscore; Report	Pts: McCowan 26; Rebs: McCowan 16; Asts: Bilgiç 6 PIR: McCowan 28	Arena: Metro Enerji Sports Hall; Referees: Serhat Büker, Kerem Yılmaz, Furkan Keseratar

4 December 2022 9	Galatasaray Çağdaş Faktoring	55–47	Botaş	Başakşehir, Istanbul, Turkey
15:30	Scoring by quarter: 19–15, 11–16, 12–10, 13–6
Youtube / TBF TV	Pts: Stevens 19; Rebs: Stevens 14; Asts: Bilgiç, Canıtez 5 PIR: Stevens 20	Boxscore; Report	Pts: Macaulay 17; Rebs: Slocum 8 Asts: Uzun 5 PIR: Macaulay 14	Arena: Başakşehir Spor Kompleksi; Referees: Seher Ayşe Nur Yazıcıoğlu, Tolga Akkuşoğlu, Ömer Sarı

10 December 2022 10	Emlak Konut	74–66	Galatasaray Çağdaş Faktoring	Başakşehir, Istanbul, Turkey
16:00	Scoring by quarter: 16–18, 21–18, 25–14, 12–16
Youtube / TBF TV	Pts: Walker 20; Rebs: Fields 6 Asts: Fields 8 PIR: Fields 16	Boxscore; Report	Pts: McCowan 20; Rebs: McCowan 13; Asts: Alben 7 PIR: McCowan 29	Arena: Başakşehir Spor Kompleksi; Referees: Göksun Öz, Turgut Işık, Selena Gamze Öget Çerçi

18 December 2022 11	Galatasaray Çağdaş Faktoring	86–58	Bursa Uludağ Basketbol	Başakşehir, Istanbul, Turkey
15:00	Scoring by quarter: 20–13, 27–17, 25–9, 14–19
Youtube / TBF TV	Pts: Stevens 19; Rebs: Stevens 8 Asts: Alben, Yıldızhan 4 PIR: Stevens 21	Boxscore; Report	Pts: Yıldız 22; Rebs: Kavurmacıoğlu 6 Asts: Darıcıoğlu 6 PIR: Yıldız 16	Arena: Başakşehir Spor Kompleksi; Referees: Yiğit Gönültaş, Burak Durmuş, Sabri Gündüz

25 December 2022 12	Melikgazi Kayseri Basketbol	61–100	Galatasaray Çağdaş Faktoring	Kayseri, Turkey
16:00	Scoring by quarter: 11–27, 17–21, 22–27, 11–25
Youtube / TBF TV	Pts: Landrum 13; Rebs: Šarauskaitė 12; Asts: Sönmez 4 PIR: Šarauskaitė 21	Boxscore; Report	Pts: McCowan 18; Rebs: McCowan 12; Asts: Alben 8 PIR: Stevens 26	Arena: Kadir Has Spor Salonu; Referees: Mehmet Şahin, Halil Erkoç, Safa Halit Çakır

30 December 2022 13	Galatasaray Çağdaş Faktoring	76–57	Nesibe Aydın	Başakşehir, Istanbul, Turkey
19:00	Scoring by quarter: 22–23, 19–6, 25–14, 10–14
Youtube / TBF TV	Pts: Nacickaitė 21; Rebs: McCowan 8 Asts: Alben 7 PIR: Nacickaitė, Stevens 20	Boxscore; Report	Pts: Nelson 21; Rebs: Nelson 9 Asts: Yaya 8 PIR: Nelson 24	Arena: Başakşehir Spor Kompleksi; Referees: Özlem Yalman, Ozan Gönen, Ömer Sarı

7 January 2023 14	Galatasaray Çağdaş Faktoring	79–59	Antalya Toroslar Basketbol	Başakşehir, Istanbul, Turkey
15:30	Scoring by quarter: 17–20, 15–12, 22–18, 25–9
Youtube / TBF TV	Pts: Stevens 20; Rebs: McCowan 12; Asts: Prince 10; PIR: Stevens 27	Boxscore; Report	Pts: Fitzgerald 18; Rebs: Hillsman 12; Asts: Fitzgerald 11; PIR: Fitzgerald 19	Arena: Başakşehir Spor Kompleksi; Referees: Özge Şentürk Bayraktar, Burak Durmuş, Barış Turgut

14 January 2023 15	Galatasaray Çağdaş Faktoring	83–57	Çankaya Üniversitesi	Ataköy, Bakırköy, Istanbul, Turkey
16:00	Scoring by quarter: 26–13, 22–20, 20–12, 15–12
Youtube / TBF TV	Pts: Stevens 27; Rebs: McCowan 8 Asts: Canıtez 7 PIR: Stevens 29	Boxscore; Report	Pts: Egbo 19; Rebs: Egbo 6 Asts: Oral 4 PIR: Egbo 18	Arena: Ahmet Cömert Sport Hall; Referees: Yiğit Gönültaş, Tolga Akkuşoğlu, Selena Gamze Öget Çerçi

21 January 2023 16	Beşiktaş	65–81	Galatasaray Çağdaş Faktoring	Istanbul, Turkey
18:00	Scoring by quarter: 15–19, 16–13, 12–27, 22–22
Youtube / TBF TV	Pts: Evans 25; Rebs: Bayram 8 Asts: Evans 7 PIR: Evans 16	Boxscore; Report	Pts: Stevens 27; Rebs: Stevens, McCowan 14; Asts: Nacickaitė, McCowan 6 PIR: Stevens 34	Arena: BJK Akatlar Arena; Referees: Murat Ciner, Münevver Özemre, Dorukhan Kalyoncu

29 January 2023 17	Galatasaray Çağdaş Faktoring	91–60	Tufan Metalurji Hatay Büyükşehir Belediyespor	Ataköy, Bakırköy, Istanbul, Turkey
16:00	Scoring by quarter: 23–10, 29–12, 26–25, 13–13
Youtube / TBF TV	Pts: Yıldızhan 17; Rebs: Canıtez 13; Asts: three players 6 PIR: Canıtez 25	Boxscore; Report	Pts: Prince 19; Rebs: Başaran 8 Asts: Prince, Slocum 5 PIR: Prince 20	Arena: Ahmet Cömert Sport Hall; Referees: Can Mavisu, Yarkın Keskin, Sabri Gündüz

4 February 2023 18	Rize Belediyesi	69–88	Galatasaray Çağdaş Faktoring	Rize, Turkey
14:00	Scoring by quarter: 27–26, 15–21, 16–25, 11–16
Youtube / TBF TV	Pts: Benson 22; Rebs: Özcan 7 Asts: Özcan 8 PIR: Benson 18	Boxscore; Report	Pts: McCowan 29; Rebs: McCowan 19; Asts: Bilgiç, Alben 5 PIR: McCowan 42	Arena: Rize Yenişehir Spor Salonu; Referees: Aytuğ Ekti, Hakan Gerey, Samet Tekin

3 March 2023 19	Galatasaray Çağdaş Faktoring	92–84	Ormanspor	Ataköy, Bakırköy, Istanbul, Turkey
18:00	Scoring by quarter: 31–23, 14–28, 29–14, 18–19
Youtube / TBF TV, Galatasaray TV	Pts: McCowan 26; Rebs: McCowan 15; Asts: Alben 8 PIR: McCowan 37	Boxscore; Report	Pts: Dubljević 26; Rebs: three players 6 Asts: Thomas 8 PIR: Thomas 31	Arena: Ahmet Cömert Sport Hall; Referees: Özlem Yalman, Burak Durmuş, Ömer Sarı
Note: Originally scheduled to be played on 16 February 2023. Postponed due to the 2023 Turkey–Syria earthquakes.

6 March 2023 20	ÇBK Mersin Yenişehir Belediyesi	75–58	Galatasaray Çağdaş Faktoring	Mersin, Turkey
18:00	Scoring by quarter: 24–16, 23–16, 16–14, 12–12
Youtube / TBF TV	Pts: Gray 17; Rebs: Hollingsworth, Crvendakić 6 Asts: Hayes 6 PIR: Hayes 15	Boxscore; Report	Pts: McCowan 19; Rebs: McCowan 14; Asts: Alben 4 PIR: McCowan 26	Arena: Servet Tazegül Spor Salonu; Referees: Ziya Özorhon, İbrahim Altıntaş, Ali Osman Kanık
Note: Originally scheduled to be played on 19 February 2023. Postponed due to the 2023 Turkey–Syria earthquakes.

9 March 2023 21	Galatasaray Çağdaş Faktoring	62–80	Fenerbahçe Alagöz Holding	Ataköy, Bakırköy, Istanbul, Turkey
18:00	Scoring by quarter: 24–25, 12–15, 15–21, 11–19
Youtube / TBF TV	Pts: Nacickaitė 18; Rebs: McCowan 12; Asts: Bilgiç 6 PIR: McCowan 24	Boxscore; Report	Pts: Onar 22; Rebs: Stewart 10; Asts: Çakır 8 PIR: Onar 26	Arena: Ahmet Cömert Sport Hall; Referees: Fatih Arslanoğlu, Turgut Işık, Alper Gökçebel
Note: Originally scheduled to be played on 25 February 2023. Postponed due to the 2023 Turkey–Syria earthquakes.

11 March 2023 22	Botaş	86–77	Galatasaray Çağdaş Faktoring	Ankara, Turkey
18:00	Scoring by quarter: 18–17, 23–26, 19–16, 26–18
Youtube / TBF TV	Pts: Macaulay 18; Rebs: Uzun 10; Asts: Uzun 14; PIR: Uzun 24	Boxscore; Report	Pts: Putniņa 26; Rebs: McCowan, Yıldızhan 6 Asts: Akbaş 6 PIR: Putniņa 26	Arena: Ankara Spor Salonu; Referees: Alper Özgök, Nihat Çetin, Selena Gamze Öget Çerçi

18 March 2023 23	Galatasaray Çağdaş Faktoring	90–68	Emlak Konut	Ataköy, Bakırköy, Istanbul, Turkey
19:30	Scoring by quarter: 23–18, 22–21, 26–12, 19–17
Youtube / TBF TV, Galatasaray TV	Pts: McCowan 26; Rebs: McCowan 13; Asts: Prince 6 PIR: McCowan 40	Boxscore; Report	Pts: Fields 21; Rebs: Çağlar, Lavender 6 Asts: Çağlar 6 PIR: Fields 17	Arena: Ahmet Cömert Sport Hall; Referees: Ahmet Tatlıcı, Ahmet Murat Arıkanlı, Sezer Bor

26 March 2023 24	Bursa Uludağ Basketbol	83–89	Galatasaray Çağdaş Faktoring	Bursa, Turkey
19:30	Scoring by quarter: 32–22, 18–27, 16–26, 17–14
Youtube / TBF TV	Pts: Carter 38; Rebs: Fluker 14; Asts: Carter 6 PIR: Carter 40	Boxscore; Report	Pts: Stevens 24; Rebs: Yıldızhan 12; Asts: Prince 7 PIR: Prince 33	Arena: Naim Süleymanoğlu Spor Kompleksi; Referees: Aytuğ Ekti, Niyazi Yasin Kahraman, Ömer Sarı

28 March 2023 25	Galatasaray Çağdaş Faktoring	80–61	Melikgazi Kayseri Basketbol	Ataköy, Bakırköy, Istanbul, Turkey
18:00	Scoring by quarter: 28–18, 19–18, 25–10, 8–15
Youtube / TBF TV, Galatasaray TV	Pts: Yıldızhan 15; Rebs: Yıldızhan 12; Asts: Bilgiç 6 PIR: Yıldızhan 23	Boxscore; Report	Pts: Weaver 18; Rebs: three players 6 Asts: Landrum 8 PIR: Landrum 16	Arena: Ahmet Cömert Sport Hall; Referees: Orhan Çağrı Hekimoğlu, Uğur Özen, Burak Aktaş

30 March 2023 26	Nesibe Aydın	62–64	Galatasaray Çağdaş Faktoring	Ankara, Turkey
17:00	Scoring by quarter: 19–9, 15–18, 21–21, 7–16
Youtube / TBF TV, Galatasaray TV	Pts: Thomas 15; Rebs: three players 6 Asts: Yaya 5 PIR: Yaya, Akalan 13	Boxscore; Report	Pts: Putniņa 15; Rebs: Putniņa 12; Asts: Akbaş, Pulvere 3 PIR: Putniņa 17	Arena: TOBB ETÜ Spor Salonu; Referees: Polat Parlak, Yiğit Emre Şimşek, Metin Erol

==== Playoffs ====
===== Quarterfinals =====
Win Loss

Note: All times are TRT (UTC+3) as listed by the Turkish Basketball Federation.

1 April 2023 1	Galatasaray Çağdaş Faktoring	76–69 (Series: 1–0)	Nesibe Aydın	Ataköy, Bakırköy, Istanbul, Turkey
16:00	Scoring by quarter: 17–20, 23–15, 16–17, 20–17
Youtube / TBF TV, sportstv	Pts: Stevens 26; Rebs: McCowan 14; Asts: Stevens 4 PIR: McCowan 23	Boxscore; Report	Pts: Thomas 25; Rebs: Nelson 9 Asts: Thomas 6 PIR: Thomas 25	Arena: Ahmet Cömert Sport Hall; Referees: Can Mavisu, Ahmet Taner İbin, Dorukhan Kalyoncu

7 April 2023 2	Nesibe Aydın	78–69 (Series: 1–1)	Galatasaray Çağdaş Faktoring	Ankara, Turkey
16:00	Scoring by quarter: 29–13, 12–15, 23–21, 14–20
Youtube / TBF TV, sportstv	Pts: Thomas 26; Rebs: Nelson 11; Asts: Thomas, Yaya 5 PIR: Thomas 26	Boxscore; Report	Pts: McCowan 26; Rebs: McCowan 14; Asts: Prince 5 PIR: McCowan 30	Arena: TOBB ETÜ Spor Salonu; Referees: Ali Serkan Emlek, Orkun Yurttaş, Ahmet Kemal Digilli

9 April 2023 3	Galatasaray Çağdaş Faktoring	84–68 (Series: 2–1)	Nesibe Aydın	Ataköy, Bakırköy, Istanbul, Turkey
17:30	Scoring by quarter: 33–14, 22–20, 14–22, 15–12
Youtube / TBF TV	Pts: Prince 24; Rebs: McCowan 19; Asts: Alben, Nacickaitė 6 PIR: McCowan 31	Boxscore; Report	Pts: Nelson 20; Rebs: Nelson 15; Asts: Nelson, Thomas 4 PIR: Nelson 33	Arena: Ahmet Cömert Sport Hall; Referees: Hüseyin Çelik, İbrahim Altıntaş, Münevver Özemre

===== Semifinals =====
Win Loss

Note: All times are TRT (UTC+3) as listed by the Turkish Basketball Federation.

18 April 2023 1	Fenerbahçe Alagöz Holding	84–60 (Series: 1–0)	Galatasaray Çağdaş Faktoring	Istanbul, Turkey
20:00	Scoring by quarter: 22–20, 23–22, 22–10, 17–8
Youtube / TBF TV, sportstv	Pts: McBride 27; Rebs: Meesseman 9 Asts: Meesseman 9 PIR: McBride 34	Boxscore; Report	Pts: McCowan 20; Rebs: McCowan 12; Asts: Prince 6 PIR: McCowan 28	Arena: Metro Enerji Sports Hall; Referees: Mehmet Şahin, Aydın Karaçam, Kerem Yılmaz

20 April 2023 2	Galatasaray Çağdaş Faktoring	78–87 (Series: 0–2)	Fenerbahçe Alagöz Holding	Ataköy, Bakırköy, Istanbul, Turkey
20:00	Scoring by quarter: 18–19, 25–22, 22–22, 13–24
Youtube / TBF TV, sportstv	Pts: McCowan 27; Rebs: McCowan 12; Asts: Yıldızhan 7 PIR: McCowan 31	Boxscore; Report	Pts: Meesseman 26; Rebs: Meesseman 7 Asts: Meesseman, Çakır 8 PIR: Meesseman 32	Arena: Ahmet Cömert Sport Hall; Referees: Emin Moğulkoç, Uğur Özen, Nazlı Çisil Güngör

=== EuroCup Women ===
==== Regular season (Group C) ====
Pos	Team	Pld	W	L	PF	PA	PD	Pts	Qualification	GOR	GAL	PIE	BYS
1	(Poland) InvestInTheWest Enea Gorzów	6	5	1	474	374	+100	11	Play-off Round 1	—	78–71	71–56	103–59
2	(Turkey) Galatasaray Cagdas Factoring	6	4	2	456	392	+64	10	Play-off Round 1	68–66	—	79–55	94–52
3	(Slovakia) Piešťanské Čajky	6	3	3	416	389	+27	9	Play-off Round 1	68–70	71–63	—	81–55
4	(Slovakia) Slavia Banská Bystrica	6	0	6	339	530	−191	6		52–86	70–81	51–85	—

Updated to match(es) played on 14 December 2022. Source: FIBA.com
Legend: Blue = home team win; Red = away team win.
Rules for classification: 1) Points; 2) Head-to-head record; 3) Head-to-head point differential. 4) General point differential 5) Points scored

==== Results summary ====
Overall						Home					Away				
Pld	W	L	PF	PA	PD	W	L	PF	PA	PD	W	L	PF	PA	PD
6	4	2	456	392	+64	3	0	241	173	+68	1	2	215	219	−4

Last updated: December 14, 2022.
Source: FIBA

==== Results by round ====
Round	1	2	3	4	5	6
Ground	H	A	A	A	H	H
Result	W	L	L	W	W	W
Position	1	2	3	3	3	2

Updated to match(es) played on December 16, 2022. Source: FIBA
A = Away; H = Home; W = Win; L = Loss

==== Matches ====
Win Loss

Note: All times are CET (UTC+1) as listed by EuroCup.

26 October 2022 1	Galatasaray Çağdaş Faktoring (Turkey)	94–52	(Slovakia) Slavia Banská Bystrica	Ataköy, Bakırköy, Istanbul, Turkey
19:00	Scoring by quarter: 34–10, 26–12, 20–14, 14–16
Youtube / FIBA TV, Galatasaray TV	Pts: Coates 25; Rebs: Coates 9 Asts: three players 6 PIR: Coates 27	Boxscore; Report	Pts: Allen 16; Rebs: Janstova 6 Asts: Grigerova 3 PIR: Janstova 15	Arena: Sinan Erdem Dome; Referees: Xhelal Mumini (Kosovo), Tomi Panov (North Macedonia), Daniella Torok (Hungary)

3 November 2022 2	InvestInTheWest ENEA Gorzów (Poland)	78–71	(Turkey) Galatasaray Çağdaş Faktoring	Gorzów Wielkopolski, Poland
20:00	Scoring by quarter: 19–23, 22–11, 21–17, 16–20
Youtube / FIBA TV, Galatasaray TV	Pts: Allen 24; Rebs: Smith 13; Asts: Allen 6 PIR: Smith 28	Boxscore; Report	Pts: Stevens 26; Rebs: Bilgiç 6 Asts: Bilgiç 6 PIR: Stevens 21	Arena: Hala of AJP; Referees: Vladyslav Isachenko (Ukraine), Ritvars Helmsteins (Latvia), Oleksandr Dotsenko (Ukraine)

9 November 2022 3	Piešťanské Čajky (Slovakia)	71–63	(Turkey) Galatasaray Çağdaş Faktoring	Piešťany, Slovakia
18:00 (20:00 TRT)	Scoring by quarter: 22–20, 11–15, 13–9, 25–19
Youtube / FIBA TV, Galatasaray TV	Pts: James 27; Rebs: Jurčenková 13; Asts: Mujović 10; PIR: James 23	Boxscore; Report	Pts: Nacickaitė 22; Rebs: Coates 7 Asts: Alben 4 PIR: Coates 13	Arena: Diplomat Arena; Referees: Ivana Ivanovic (Serbia), Viktor Nagy (Hungary), Ivana Radinovic (Montenegro)

16 November 2022 4	Slavia Banská Bystrica (Slovakia)	70–81	(Turkey) Galatasaray Çağdaş Faktoring	Banská Bystrica, Slovakia
19:00 (21:00 TRT)	Scoring by quarter: 19–25, 20–22, 11–23, 20–11
Youtube / FIBA TV, Galatasaray TV	Pts: Allen 17; Rebs: Allen, Janstova 8 Asts: Allen 7 PIR: Janstova, Kaliuzhna 16	Boxscore; Report	Pts: Nacickaitė 27; Rebs: Coates 13; Asts: Bilgiç 6 PIR: Coates 25	Arena: Sport Hall Dukla; Referees: Cecília Tóth (Hungary), Balazs Meszaros (Hungary), Nikola Perlic (Croatia)

7 December 2022 5	Galatasaray Çağdaş Faktoring (Turkey)	68–66	(Poland) InvestInTheWest ENEA Gorzów	Ataköy, Bakırköy, Istanbul, Turkey
19:00	Scoring by quarter: 10–24, 21–12, 23–11, 14–19
Youtube / FIBA TV, Galatasaray TV	Pts: McCowan 33; Rebs: McCowan 14; Asts: Bilgiç 5 PIR: McCowan 38	Boxscore; Report	Pts: Wadoux 16; Rebs: Şenyürek, Keller 6 Asts: Allen 5 PIR: Smith 19	Arena: Sinan Erdem Dome; Referees: Vladimir Jevtovic (Serbia), Petar Pesic (Serbia), Mladen Lucic (Montenegro)

14 December 2022 6	Galatasaray Çağdaş Faktoring (Turkey)	79–55	(Slovakia) Piešťanské Čajky	Başakşehir, Istanbul, Turkey
19:00	Scoring by quarter: 16–14, 15–12, 26–12, 22–17
Youtube / FIBA TV	Pts: Stevens 25; Rebs: Stevens, McCowan 11; Asts: four players 4 PIR: Stevens 29	Boxscore; Report	Pts: Mujović 17; Rebs: Jurčenková 6 Asts: Mujović 4 PIR: Mujović 16	Arena: Başakşehir Spor Kompleksi; Referees: Alija Ferevski (North Macedonia), Nataša Dragojević (Montenegro), Dumitru Stasiev (Moldova)

==== Play-Off Round 1 ====
Win Loss

Note: All times are CET (UTC+1) as listed by EuroCup.

4 January 2023 1	Uni Győr (Hungary)	61–78	(Turkey) Galatasaray Çağdaş Faktoring	Győr, Hungary
18:00 (20:00 TRT)	Scoring by quarter: 20–18, 17–21, 15–21, 9–18
Youtube / FIBA TV	Pts: Ellenberg-Wiley 27; Rebs: Ellenberg-Wiley, Mompremier 7 Asts: Ellenberg-Wiley 5 PIR: Ellenberg-Wiley 23	Boxscore; Report	Pts: Nacickaitė 19; Rebs: McCowan 18; Asts: Nacickaitė, Prince 5 PIR: McCowan 32	Arena: University Hall of Győr; Referees: Goran Sljivic (Austria), Veronika Vavrova (Czech Republic), Veronika Obertova (Slovakia)

11 January 2023 2	Galatasaray Çağdaş Faktoring (Turkey)	64–54 (142–115 agg.)	(Hungary) Uni Győr	Ataköy, Bakırköy, Istanbul, Turkey
20:00	Scoring by quarter: 17–25, 15–7, 12–6, 20–16
Youtube / FIBA TV, Galatasaray TV	Pts: McCowan 16; Rebs: McCowan 11; Asts: Prince 5 PIR: McCowan 21	Boxscore; Report	Pts: Mompremier 14; Rebs: Mompremier 14; Asts: Bach 5 PIR: Mompremier 21	Arena: Ahmet Cömert Sport Hall; Referees: Zoran Mitrovski (North Macedonia), Alakbar Hasanov (Azerbaijan), Andrea Bongiorni (Italy)

==== Round of 16 ====
Win Loss

Note: All times are CET (UTC+1) as listed by EuroCup.

25 January 2023 1	Galatasaray Çağdaş Faktoring (Turkey)	88–75	(France) BLMA	Ataköy, Bakırköy, Istanbul, Turkey
20:00	Scoring by quarter: 26–14, 22–22, 20–22, 20–17
Youtube / FIBA TV, Galatasaray TV	Pts: McCowan 29; Rebs: McCowan, Stevens 12; Asts: Stevens 9 PIR: McCowan, Stevens 33	Boxscore; Report	Pts: Vanloo 18; Rebs: Peters 6 Asts: Vanloo 7 PIR: Peters 20	Arena: Ahmet Cömert Sport Hall; Referees: Radomir Vojinovic (Montenegro), Xhelal Mumini (Kosovo), Milosav Kaludjerovic (Montenegro)

1 February 2023 2	BLMA (France)	57–67 (132–155 agg.)	(Turkey) Galatasaray Çağdaş Faktoring	Lattes, France
20:00 (22:00 TRT)	Scoring by quarter: 16–14, 7–15, 16–21, 18–17
Youtube / FIBA TV	Pts: Linskens 15; Rebs: Linskens 9 Asts: Vanloo 8 PIR: Linskens 20	Boxscore; Report	Pts: McCowan 21; Rebs: McCowan 16; Asts: Prince 6 PIR: McCowan 31	Arena: Palais des Sports; Referees: Alfred Jovovic (Croatia), Ciprian Stoica (Romania), Pavel Fuska (Slovakia)

==== Quarterfinals ====
Win Loss

Note: All times are CET (UTC+1) as listed by EuroCup.

22 February 2023 1	Cadí La Seu (Spain)	61–86	(Turkey) Galatasaray Çağdaş Faktoring	La Seu d'Urgell, Spain
19:00 (21:00 TRT)	Scoring by quarter: 12–19, 19–21, 8–29, 22–17
Youtube / FIBA TV, Galatasaray TV	Pts: Watts 14; Rebs: Watts 6 Asts: Soler 4 PIR: Watts, Raventós 11	Boxscore; Report	Pts: Prince 22; Rebs: McCowan 23; Asts: Alben 6 PIR: Prince, McCowan 28	Arena: Palau d'Esports; Referees: Sonia Teixeira (Portugal), Valerio Grigioni (Italy), Nikola Bejat (Norway)

1 March 2023 2	Galatasaray Çağdaş Faktoring (Turkey)	75–65 (161–126 agg.)	(Spain) Cadí La Seu	Ataköy, Bakırköy, Istanbul, Turkey
20:00	Scoring by quarter: 21–12, 19–15, 15–20, 20–18
Youtube / FIBA TV, Galatasaray TV	Pts: McCowan 20; Rebs: McCowan 16; Asts: Alben 6 PIR: McCowan 26	Boxscore; Report	Pts: Tunstull 14; Rebs: Tunstull 6 Asts: Ramette 3 PIR: Tunstull 18	Arena: Ahmet Cömert Sport Hall; Referees: Zdenko Tomasovic (Slovakia), Ventsislav Velikov (Bulgaria), Josip Jurcevic (Croatia)

==== Semifinals ====
Win Loss

Note: All times are CET (UTC+1) as listed by EuroCup.

16 March 2023 1	Galatasaray Çağdaş Faktoring (Turkey)	74–49	(Italy) Umana Reyer Venezia	Ataköy, Bakırköy, Istanbul, Turkey
20:00	Scoring by quarter: 14–10, 10–15, 21–11, 29–13
Youtube / FIBA TV, Galatasaray TV	Pts: McCowan 21; Rebs: McCowan 16; Asts: Stevens 4 PIR: McCowan 31	Boxscore; Report	Pts: Shepard 20; Rebs: Shepard 7 Asts: Santucci 4 PIR: Shepard 18	Arena: Ahmet Cömert Sport Hall; Referees: Petr Hrusa (Czech Republic), Gintaras Maciulis (Lithuania), Jelena Tomic (Croatia)

23 March 2023 2	Umana Reyer Venezia (Italy)	69–60 (118–134 agg.)	(Turkey) Galatasaray Çağdaş Faktoring	Mestre, Venice, Italy
19:30 (21:30 TRT)	Scoring by quarter: 13–12, 19–11, 18–22, 19–15
Youtube / FIBA TV, Galatasaray TV	Pts: Shepard 15; Rebs: Shepard 9 Asts: Shepard, Villa 4 PIR: Shepard 19	Boxscore; Report	Pts: Stevens 20; Rebs: McCowan 18; Asts: Alben 2 PIR: McCowan 29	Arena: Palasport Giuseppe Taliercio; Referees: Zdenko Tomasovic (Slovakia), Ariadna Chueca Moreno (Spain), Carsten Straube (Germany)

==== Final ====
Win Loss

Note: All times are CET (UTC+1) as listed by EuroCup.

5 April 2023 1	LDLC ASVEL Féminin (France)	95–56	(Turkey) Galatasaray Çağdaş Faktoring	Villeurbanne, Lyon, France
20:00 (21:00 TRT)	Scoring by quarter: 27–19, 23–9, 22–12, 23–16
Youtube / FIBA TV, Galatasaray TV	Pts: Johannès 25; Rebs: Gruda 10; Asts: Williams 5 PIR: Williams 22	Boxscore; Report	Pts: McCowan 12; Rebs: McCowan 12; Asts: Prince, Stevens 4 PIR: McCowan 17	Arena: Astroballe; Referees: Gvidas Gedvilas (Lithuania), Cecília Tóth (Hungary), Marek Kukelcik (Slovakia)

12 April 2023 2	Galatasaray Çağdaş Faktoring (Turkey)	57–85 (113–180 agg.)	(France) LDLC ASVEL Féminin	Ataköy, Bakırköy, Istanbul, Turkey
20:00	Scoring by quarter: 13–23, 14–32, 15–16, 15–14
Youtube / FIBA TV, Galatasaray TV	Pts: McCowan 21; Rebs: McCowan 6 Asts: Yıldızhan 5 PIR: McCowan 21	Boxscore; Report	Pts: Johannès 20; Rebs: Ciak 10; Asts: Johannès 6 PIR: Gruda 21	Arena: Sinan Erdem Dome; Referees: Paulo Marques (Portugal), Viola Gyorgyi (Romania), Beniamino Manuel Attard (Italy)

=== Turkish Women's Basketball Cup ===
==== Quarterfinals ====
Win Loss Postponed

6–7 March 2023 QF	Emlak Konut	Suspended	Galatasaray Çağdaş Faktoring	Başakşehir, Istanbul, Turkey
		Boxscore		Arena: Başakşehir Spor Kompleksi
Note: Originally scheduled to be played on 6–7 March 2023. Postponed due to the 2023 Turkey–Syria earthquakes.
