= Jacki Gemelos =

Greek-American basketball player (born 1988)

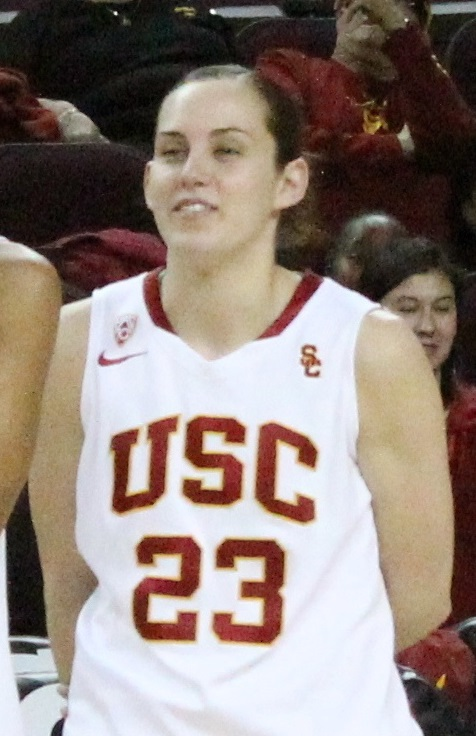
- Gemelos in 2011 with USC.

Personal information
- Born: November 22, 1988 (age 37) Stockton, California, U.S.
- Listed height: 6 ft 0 in (1.83 m)
- Listed weight: 165 lb (75 kg)

Career information
- High school: St. Mary's (Stockton, California)
- College: USC (2009–2012)
- WNBA draft: 2012: 3rd round, 31st overall pick
- Drafted by: Minnesota Lynx
- Playing career: 2013–2021
- Coaching career: 2021–present

Career history

Playing
- 2013–2014: Panathinaikos
- 2014–2015: PF Umbertide
- 2015: Chicago Sky
- 2015–2016: Perfumerias Avenida
- 2016–2019: Saces Mapei Napoli
- 2019–2020: Olympiacos
- 2020: Connecticut Sun
- 2020: Washington Mystics
- 2020–2021: Kayseri Basketbol

Coaching
- 2021: New York Liberty (assistant)

Career highlights
- MaxPreps National Player of the Year (2006); McDonald's All-American (2006)
- Stats at WNBA.com
- Stats at Basketball Reference
Medals
Women's basketball
Representing the United States
World University Games
Gold medal – first place	2011 Shenzhen	Team

Jacqueline Ann Gemelos (Greek: Τζάκι Γέμελου; born November 22, 1988) is an American-Greek former professional basketball player and coach.

== Early life and college career ==
Born and raised in Stockton, California, Jacqueline Ann Gemelos graduated from St. Mary's High School in 2006.

Gemelos was widely regarded as the most recruited player in her high school class, but she suffered five knee injuries during her high school and college career. At USC, Gemelos missed the 2006–07 through 2008–09 seasons due to injuries, before making her collegiate debut on February 4, 2010, at Cal and had eight points, five rebounds, and five assists. She ended the 2009–10 season averaging 7.6 points and 3.6 rebounds.

Gemelos completed her bachelor's degree in sociology at USC in 2010 and master's degree in gerontology in 2012. She played all 37 games (28 starts) of the 2010–11 season and averaged 12.4 points and 4.6 rebounds. In the 2011–12 season, Gemelos started the first nine games before a season-ending injury on December 18, 2011. That season, she averaged 11.0 points and 7.3 rebounds.

== Professional career ==
=== WNBA ===
In the 2012 WNBA draft, the Minnesota Lynx drafted Gemelos in the third round. Gemelos was signed to the team in April 2013 but was released prior to the regular season.

In 2015, Gemelos made her WNBA debut with the Chicago Sky. In 17 games with Chicago, Gemelos averaged 1.1 points, 0.5 rebounds, and 0.4 assists.

On April 11, 2018, Gemelos signed a contract to return to the United States to play in the WNBA with the Las Vegas Aces, but was eventually cut from the final roster.

On June 25, 2020, Gemelos signed a contract to play in the WNBA with the Connecticut Sun. Despite enduring five ACL tears and eight knee surgeries over the last 15 years of her career, Gemelos finally debuted for the Sun on July 28, 2020; five years after her first stint with the Sky. She scored 6 points and 1 rebound in the game.

=== Euroleague ===
Gemelos debuted professionally with Panathinaikos of the Greek Women's Basketball League in the 2013–14 season. She averaged 17.6 points and 6.2 rebounds in 15 games.

In 2014–15, Gemelos played for PF Umbertide of the Italian Serie A1, averaging 14.2 points and 5.8 rebounds.

She returned to Europe for the 2015–16 season with Perfumerias Avenida of the Spanish Liga Femenina de Baloncesto, who went 25–1 for the season. In 25 games, Gemelos averaged 10.2 points and 4.8 rebounds.

On May 23, 2016, Gemelos again signed with a Serie A1 team in Italy, Saces Mapei Napoli.

== International career ==
=== USA Basketball ===
Gemelos played on the team presenting the USA at the 2011 World University Games held in Shenzhen, China. The team won all six games to earn the gold medal. Gemelos was tied for third for assists on the team, with 11 over the course of the tournament. Gemelos averaged 4.8 points per game.

=== Greek national team ===
On 28 January 2018, Gemelos was selected to the Greece women's national basketball team.

== Career statistics ==
=== WNBA ===
Legend
GP	Games played	GS	Games started	MPG	Minutes per game	RPG	Rebounds per game
APG	Assists per game	SPG	Steals per game	BPG	Blocks per game	PPG	Points per game
TO	Turnovers per game	FG%	Field-goal percentage	3P%	3-point field-goal percentage	FT%	Free-throw percentage
**Bold**	Career best	°	League leader

==== Regular season ====
WNBA regular season statistics
Year	Team	GP	GS	MPG	FG%	3P%	FT%	RPG	APG	SPG	BPG	TO	PPG
2012	Did not play (injury)												
2013	Did not play (waived)												
2014	Did not play (waived)												
2015	Chicago	**17**	0	5.0	40.0	30.0	0.0	0.5	0.4	0.3	**0.1**	**0.3**	1.1
2016	Did not play (waived)												
2017	Did not play (did not appear in WNBA)												
2018	Did not play (injury–knee)												
2019	Did not play (did not appear in WNBA)												
2020	Connecticut	6	0	4.8	**50.0**	**50.0**	—	0.3	0.2	0.3	0.0	0.5	1.8
2020	Washington	12	**1**	**16.1**	31.3	20.7	**50.0**	**1.4**	**1.2**	0.3	**0.1**	0.8	**3.2**
**Career**	2 years, 3 teams	35	1	8.8	35.5	26.7	33.3	0.8	0.6	0.3	0.1	0.5	1.9

==== Playoffs ====
WNBA playoff statistics
Year	Team	GP	GS	MPG	FG%	3P%	FT%	RPG	APG	SPG	BPG	TO	PPG
2020	Washington	1	0	11.0	33.3	100.0	0.0	3.0	2.0	0.0	0.0	0.0	3.0
**Career**	1 year, 1 team	1	0	11.0	33.3	100.0	0.0	3.0	2.0	0.0	0.0	0.0	3.0

=== College ===
NCAA Statistics
Year	Team	GP	Points	FG%	3P%	FT%	RPG	APG	SPG	BPG	PPG
2009–10	USC	11	84	.325	.286	**.929**	3.6	1.4	0.8	0.3	7.6
2010–11	USC	**37**	**457**	**.424**	**.423**	.812	4.6	2.6	**1.4**	0.7	**12.4**
2011–12	USC	9	99	.356	.286	.750	**7.3**	**3.4**	1.3	**0.8**	11.0
**Career**		57	640	.399	.384	.823	4.9	2.5	1.3	0.6	11.2

== Personal life ==
Her father Steve Gemelos, of Greek descent, played college basketball at Weber State and San Joaquin Delta, followed by two years of professional basketball in Greece. In 2012, Jacki Gemelos became a dual citizen of the US and Greece. Gemelos owns a line of apparel called "Overcome".
