= Eddie Vaughn =

Coaching career (HC unless noted)
- 1984–1985: Mississippi State (women)
- 1990–1992: Neosho County CC (men)

Head coaching record
- Overall: 43–45 (.489)

Eddie Vaughn is a former women's basketball coach. He served as the head coach of the Mississippi State Bulldogs women's basketball team for the 1984–85 season, compiling a record of 8–19. He had been named interim coach in August 1984 after the sudden resignation of Peggy Collins. After the season, he hoped to be named permanent coach, but the Bulldogs instead hired Brenda Paul.

He later served as head coach of the men's team at Neosho County Community College and as a men's assistant coach at Marshall and Louisiana–Lafayette, along with coaching at several high schools over the years.

== Head coaching record ==
Record table
Season	Team	Overall	Conference	Standing	Postseason
Mississippi State Bulldogs (women) (SEC) (1984–1985)
1984–1985	Mississippi State	8–19	0–9	10th	
Mississippi State (women):		8–19 (.296)	0–9 (.000)		
Neosho County CC (men) (KJCCC) (1990–1992)
1990–1991	Neosho County CC	19–11			
1991–1992	Neosho County CC	16–15			
Neosho County CC (men):		35–26 (.574)			
Total:		43–45 (.489)			
National champion Postseason invitational champion Conference regular season champion Conference regular season and conference tournament champion Division regular season champion Division regular season and conference tournament champion Conference tournament champion
