= Young Harris Mountain Lions =

Intercollegiate sports teams of Young Harris College

- University: Young Harris College
- Conference: Conference Carolinas (primary)
- NCAA: Division II
- Athletic director: Aaron Bessey
- Location: Young Harris, Georgia
- Varsity teams: 21 (9 men's, 11 women's, 1 co-ed)
- Basketball arena: The Harp Recreation and Commencement Center
- Baseball stadium: Zell B. Miller Field
- Softball stadium: YHC Softball Field
- Soccer stadium: YHC Soccer and Lacrosse Field
- Lacrosse stadium: YHC Soccer and Lacrosse Field
- Tennis venue: Bob & Gayle Nichols Tennis Complex
- Nickname: Mountain Lions
- Colors: Purple and white
- Website: yhcathletics.com
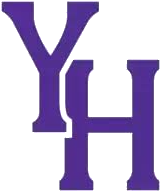

The Young Harris Mountain Lions are the athletic teams that represent Young Harris College, located in Young Harris, Georgia, in intercollegiate sports at the Division II level of the National Collegiate Athletic Association (NCAA), primarily competing in Conference Carolinas beginning in the 2023–24 academic year.

Young Harris competes in twenty intercollegiate varsity sports. Men's sports include baseball, basketball, cross country, golf, lacrosse, soccer, tennis, and track and field; while women's sports include basketball, cross country, golf, lacrosse, soccer, softball, tennis, track and field, and volleyball. The Mountain Lions also sponsor a co-ed spirit cheerleading team.

== History ==
On July 1, 2014, the school completed the transition from the GCAA and the NJCAA to the NCAA at the Division II level. The college originally applied to the NCAA in 2010, but the application was rejected. The school re-applied in 2011 and received acceptance into the three-year process to become a full member. As of the 2011–12 academic year, Young Harris was in the first year of candidacy-membership.

Young Harris later became a member of the PBC, effective July 1, 2012. As part of the transition process into the NCAA, the college began NCAA Division II and Peach Belt Conference schedules for its athletic teams and was immediately eligible for all regular-season championships and other conference awards. During the transition process into the NCAA the college is ineligible for NCAA postseason automatic bids as well as for participation in any PBC Championships which award automatic bids to NCAA Tournaments. As part of the transition to the NCAA, Young Harris reinstated its men's basketball program in 2010, bringing intercollegiate basketball to the college for the first time in 40 years; at the same time, YHC added women's basketball. The college added men's and women's lacrosse teams and a competitive cheerleading team in the 2012–2013 academic year.

Effective June 30, 2023, Young Harris College withdrew from the Peach Belt Conference, resulting in a lawsuit against the school for not providing a notice of withdrawal at least two calendar years in advance as stated in the conference constitution. Young Harris College gave less than a year's notice, resulting in a fee of $240,000. On July 1, 2023, Young Harris College officially joined Conference Carolinas, becoming the 14th member of the NCAA Division II conference.

== Conference affiliations ==
NJCAA

- Georgia Collegiate Athletic Association (2010–2011)

NCAA

- Peach Belt Conference (2012–2023)
- Conference Carolinas (2023–present)

== Varsity teams ==
Young Harris also sponsors a co-ed spirit cheer program.

| Men's sports | Women's sports |
|---|---|
| Baseball | Softball |
| Basketball | Basketball |
| Cross country | Cross country |
| Golf | Golf |
| Lacrosse | Lacrosse |
| Soccer | Soccer |
| Tennis | Tennis |
| Track and field^{1} | Track and field^{1} |
| | Volleyball |
^{1} – includes both indoor and outdoor

== Individual teams ==
=== Baseball ===
Baseball coach Rick Robinson earned his 500th win at Young Harris in April 2009, and had been highly successful in placing players in Division I schools. The Young Harris baseball team has captured eight Georgia Junior College titles and five Region XVII titles since 1999, and advanced to the Junior College World Series 2007. The team has averaged 49 wins per season each year since 2004. The team plays on Zell B. Miller Field.

=== Men's basketball ===
The school fielded a successful men's basketball team in the 1950s and 1960s. However, the program remained dormant until November 13, 2010, when the sport returned after a 40-year absence, led by former Georgia interim head coach Pete Herrmann. After Herrmann's retirement at the end of the 2017–18 season, Jeremy Currier took the helm of the program.

Statistics overview
| Season | Coach | Overall | Conference | Standing | Postseason |
|---|---|---|---|---|---|
Pete Herrmann (Independent) (2010–2012)
| 2010–11 | Pete Herrmann | 5–21 | | Transition to DII | |
| 2011–12 | Pete Herrmann | 22–4 | | Transition to DII | |
Pete Herrmann (Peach Belt Conference) (2012–2018)
| 2012–13 | Pete Herrmann | 17–9 | 12–7 | 2nd (West) | |
| 2013–14 | Pete Herrmann | 17–9 | 11–8 | T–2nd (West) | |
| 2014–15 | Pete Herrmann | 13–14 | 9–10 | T–4th (West) | |
| 2015–16 | Pete Herrmann | 15–14 | 13–6 | 3rd (West) | |
| 2016–17 | Pete Herrmann | 17–11 | 11–8 | T–1st (West) | |
| 2017–18 | Pete Herrmann | 8–20 | 7–15 | T–9th | |
Jeremy Currier (Peach Belt Conference) (2018–2023)
| 2018–19 | Jeremy Currier | 13–16 | 11–11 | T–6th | |
| 2019–20 | Jeremy Currier | 9–19 | 7–13 | 9th | |
| 2020–21 | Jeremy Currier | 5–6 | 5–5 | 7th | |
| 2021–22 | Jeremy Currier | 6–21 | 3–15 | T-9th | |
| 2022–23 | Jeremy Currier | 19–10 | 9–9 | 4th | |
Jeremy Currier (Conference Carolinas) (2023–present)
| 2023–24 | Jeremy Currier | 17–12 | 11–7 | 2nd (Southwest) | |
| Total: | | 173–186 (.482) | | | |
National champion Postseason invitational champion Conference regular season champion Conference regular season and conference tournament champion Division regular season champion Division regular season and conference tournament champion Conference tournament champion

=== Men's soccer ===
The men's soccer team was a regional finalist in 2006 & 2007. In 1998, led by former coach Jim Thomas, the Mountain Lions won the 1998 NJCAA Division I State Soccer Title.

=== Women's basketball ===
Women's basketball began at Young Harris on November 15, 2010, led by former Mississippi State head coach Brenda Paul. Paul was succeeded by Matt Stearsman, who served most of the 2014–15 season as interim head coach before leading the program as full-time head coach until the end of the 2017–18 season. Longtime Division I head coach Jim Davis then served as the Mountain Lions' head coach for the 2018–19 season. Upon Davis' departure, Lindsey Huffman took the helm of the program and has served as head coach since the 2019–20 season, winning Peach Belt Conference coach of the year honors in her first season.

Statistics overview
| Season | Coach | Overall | Conference | Standing | Postseason |
|---|---|---|---|---|---|
Brenda Paul (Independent) (2010–2012)
| 2010–11 | Brenda Paul | 11–13 | | Transition to DII | |
| 2011–12 | Brenda Paul | 23–3 | | Transition to DII | |
Brenda Paul (Peach Belt Conference) (2012–2014)
| 2012–13 | Brenda Paul | 13–13 | 7–12 | 6th (West) | |
| 2013–14 | Brenda Paul | 19–7 | 14–5 | 3rd (West) | |
Brenda Paul/Matt Stearsman (Peach Belt Conference) (2014–2015)
| 2014–15 | Brenda Paul; Matt Stearsman (Interim) | 10–16 | 7–12 | 6th (West) | |
Matt Stearsman (Peach Belt Conference) (2015–2018)
| 2015–16 | Matt Stearsman | 11–15 | 6–13 | 6th (West) | |
| 2016–17 | Matt Stearsman | 9–17 | 5–14 | 6th (West) | |
| 2017–18 | Matt Stearsman | 9–20 | 6–16 | 9th | |
Jim Davis (Peach Belt Conference) (2018–2019)
| 2018–19 | Jim Davis | 6–22 | 4–18 | 12th | |
Lindsey Huffman (Peach Belt Conference) (2019–2023)
| 2019–20 | Lindsey Huffman | 14–15 | 8–12 | T-8th | |
| 2020–21 | Lindsey Huffman | 5–7 | 5–7 | 7th | |
| 2021–22 | Lindsey Huffman | 13–15 | 5–13 | T-8th | |
| 2022–23 | Lindsey Huffman | 15–14 | 9–9 | T-6th | |
Lindsey Huffman (Conference Carolinas) (2023–present)
| 2023–24 | Lindsey Huffman | 16–14 | 11–7 | 3rd (Southwest) | |
| Total: | | 174–191 (.477) | | | |
National champion Postseason invitational champion Conference regular season champion Conference regular season and conference tournament champion Division regular season champion Division regular season and conference tournament champion Conference tournament champion

=== Women's soccer ===
The Young Harris Lady Mountain Lions won the 2006 NJCAA Division I Women's Soccer National Championship, under head coach Kathy Brown. Brown originally served as the assistant coach at Jacksonville State before coming to Young Harris in 1997 and starting the women's soccer program. In just her first season as a head coach, Brown celebrated her first state championship. Coach Brown led the Lady Mountain Lions to a total of eight state titles during her tenure, which lasted through the 2015 season. Christiane Lessa led the program for the 2016 season, followed by longtime Kennesaw State head coach Rob King through 2020. The program is currently led by former Young Harris men's soccer athlete and assistant under Kathy Brown, Avram Allen.

== Notable alumni ==
=== Men's soccer ===
- Kevin Coiffic
- Daniel Fischer
- Carlos Gómez
- Ilija Ilić
- Anuar Kanan
- Macauley King
- Marco Micaletto
- Mikie Rowe
- Khurram Shazad
- Yesin van der Pluijm

=== Women's soccer ===
- Kennya Cordner
- Candace Edwards
- Natisha John
- Ahkeela Mollon

=== Baseball ===
- Nick Markakis
- Charlie Blackmon
- Billy Buckner
