= Jerry Henderson =

American basketball player and coach

Biographical details
- Born: June 22, 1941; Neshoba County, Mississippi
- Died: May 17, 2014 (aged 72)
- Education: Mississippi State University; Mississippi College

Coaching career (HC unless noted)
- 1989–1995: Mississippi State

Head coaching record
- Overall: 62–101 (.380)

Jerry Douglas Henderson (June 22, 1941 – May 17, 2014) was a men's and women's basketball coach. He served as the head coach of the Mississippi State Bulldogs women's basketball team from 1989 through 1995, compiling a career record of 62–101.

Henderson attended Mississippi State University on a basketball scholarship and later served in the Mississippi Air National Guard. He died of cancer in 2014.

Mississippi Coaches Hall of Fame, Neshoba County native and graduate of Jackson Provine, Mississippi State, and Mississippi College who was a 47-year coaching veteran; led Madison Ridgeland High to 1983 state title; guided Warren Central to state championships in 1986, 1987, & 1989; led Mississippi State Lady Bulldogs from 1989-1995; led his prep boys & girls basketball teams to 896 wins and 351 losses plus 90 tournament championships.

== Head coaching record ==
Record table
| Season | Team | Overall | Conference | Standing | Postseason |
|---|---|---|---|---|---|
Mississippi State Bulldogs (SEC) (1989–1995)
| 1989–1990 | Mississippi State | 9–19 | 0–9 | 10th | |
| 1990–1991 | Mississippi State | 7–20 | 0–9 | 10th | |
| 1991–1992 | Mississippi State | 15–13 | 4–7 | T-7th | |
| 1992–1993 | Mississippi State | 14–13 | 3–8 | 11th | |
| 1993–1994 | Mississippi State | 8–18 | 1–10 | 12th | |
| 1994–1995 | Mississippi State | 9–18 | 1–10 | T-10th | |
| Mississippi State: | | 62–101 (.380) | 9–53 (.145) | | |
| Total: | | 62–101 (.380) | | | |
National champion Postseason invitational champion Conference regular season champion Conference regular season and conference tournament champion Division regular season champion Division regular season and conference tournament champion Conference tournament champion
