= Khurram Shazad =

Association football player (born 1990)

Personal information
- Date of birth: 21 October 1990 (age 36)
- Place of birth: Halifax, England
- Position: Attacking midfielder

Team information
- Current team: Silsden

College career
Years	Team	Apps	(Gls)
2011–2014	Young Harris Mountain Lions	76	(32)

Senior career*
Years	Team	Apps	(Gls)
2013	Rocket City United		
2015–2016	WSG Tirol	42	(6)
2018–2019	Eccleshill		
2019–2020	Silsden		
2021	Albion Sports		
2021–	Silsden		
- * Club domestic league appearances and goals

Khurram Shazad (born 21 October 1990) is a footballer who plays as an attacking midfielder for Silsden. Born in England, he was a youth international for Pakistan. Besides England, he has played in the United States and Austria.

== Club career ==
In 2011, Shazad joined the Young Harris Mountain Lions in the United States. In 2013, he signed for American fourth division side Rocket City United. Before the second half of 2014–15, Shazad signed for WSG Tirol in the Austrian second division, where he made 48 appearances and scored 7 goals. On 21 March 2015, he debuted for WSG Tirol during a 1–0 win over FC Bizau. On 28 March 2015, Shazad scored his first goal for WSG Tirol during a 4–1 win over TSV St. Johann. In 2018, he signed for English ninth division club Eccleshill.

== International career ==
Shazad is eligible to represent Pakistan internationally.
