= Libba Birmingham =

American basketball coach

Biographical details
- Education: Mississippi University for Women

Coaching career (HC unless noted)
- 1974–1977: Mississippi State

Head coaching record
- Overall: 29–38 (.433)

Elizabeth Jane "Libba" Birmingham is a former women's basketball coach and administrator. She was the first head coach of the Mississippi State Bulldogs women's basketball team, leading the program from 1974 to 1977, with a career record of 29–38.

Birmingham later became Women's Athletic Director for the school.

== Head coaching record ==
Record table
Season	Team	Overall	Conference	Standing	Postseason
Mississippi State Bulldogs (none) (1974–1977)
1974–1975	Mississippi State	8–13			
1975–1976	Mississippi State	13-12			
1976–1977	Mississippi State	8–13			
Mississippi State:		29–38 (.433)			
Total:		29–38 (.433)			
National champion Postseason invitational champion Conference regular season champion Conference regular season and conference tournament champion Division regular season champion Division regular season and conference tournament champion Conference tournament champion
