= Aija Jurjāne =

Latvian women's basketball player

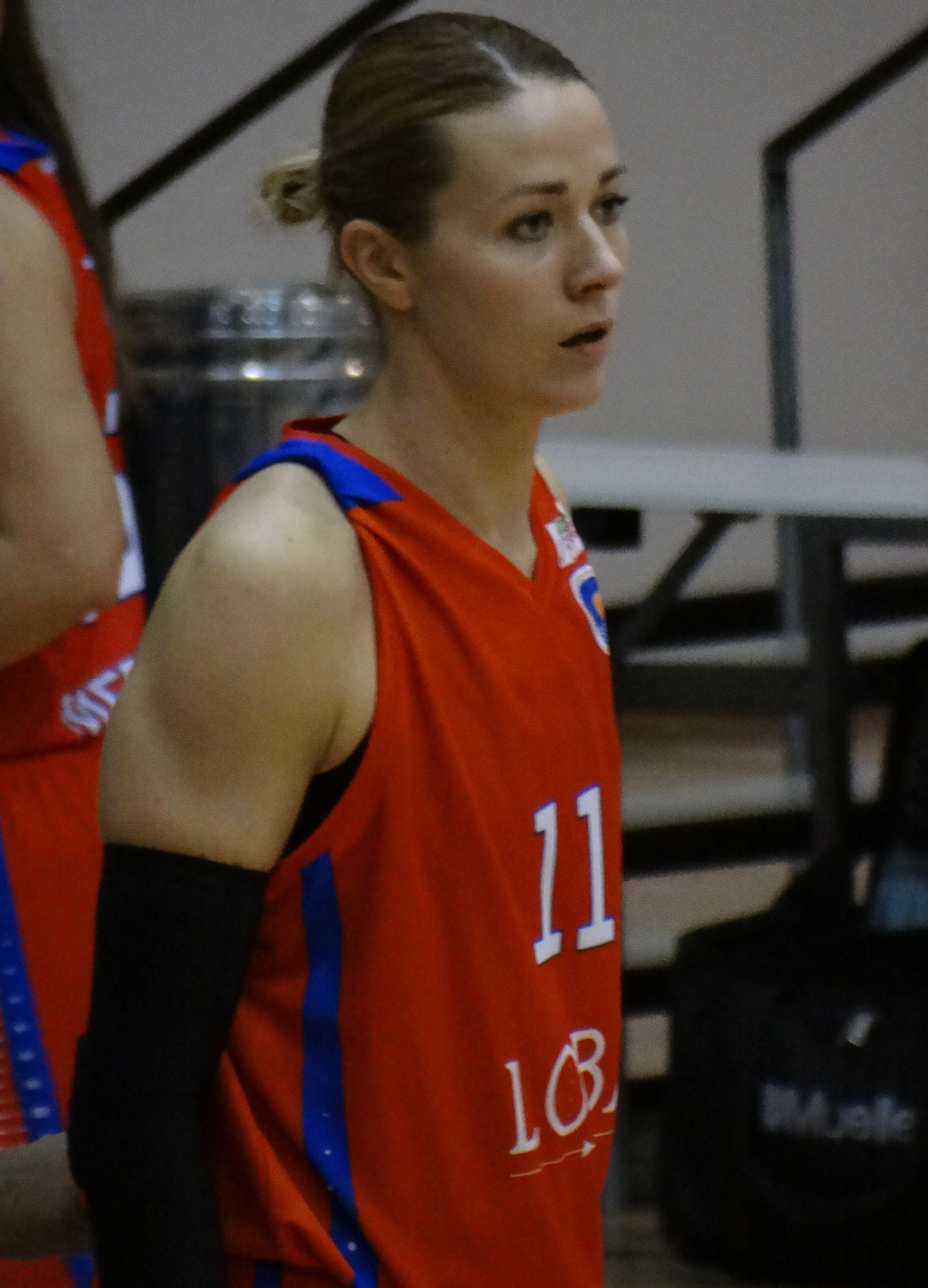

Personal information
- Born: 15 January 1988 (age 38) Riga, Latvian SSR, Soviet Union
- Listed height: 6 ft 3 in (1.91 m)
- Listed weight: 181 lb (82 kg)

Career information
- High school: Regis Jesuit High School (Aurora, Colorado) (2006)
- College: Colorado (2008)
- WNBA draft: 2010: undrafted
- Playing career: 2008–present
- Position: Power forward

Career history
- 2008–2009: Olesa Espanyol
- 2009–2010: USO Mondeville
- 2010–2011: ASPTT Arras
- 2011–2012: PF Umbertide
- 2012–2013: UNB Obenasa
- 2013–2014: PF Umbertide
- 2014: PINKK Pecsi 424
- 2015: San Martino
- 2015–2016: Nantes Rezé Basketball
- 2016–2017: İstanbul Üniversitesi SK
- 2017: Canik Belediyespor
- 2018: Mersin BB
- 2018: CB Avenida
- 2018–2019: Aluinvent DVTK Miskolc
- 2019–2020: Çankaya Üniversitesi
- 2021–2022: Botaş
- 2022–2023: Galatasaray

Aija Jurjāne (née Putniņa; born 15 January 1988) is a Latvian women's basketball player with the Latvia women's national basketball team. She competed with the team at the 2008 Summer Olympics, where she scored 2 points in 3 games.

== Professional career ==
=== Galatasaray ===
On 5 August 2022, she signed with Galatasaray of the Turkish Women's Basketball Super League (TKBL).

As of July 2023, her contract has expired. Galatasaray club said goodbye to the player on 6 July 2023 by publishing a thank you message.
