= Teaira McCowan =

American basketball player (born 1996)

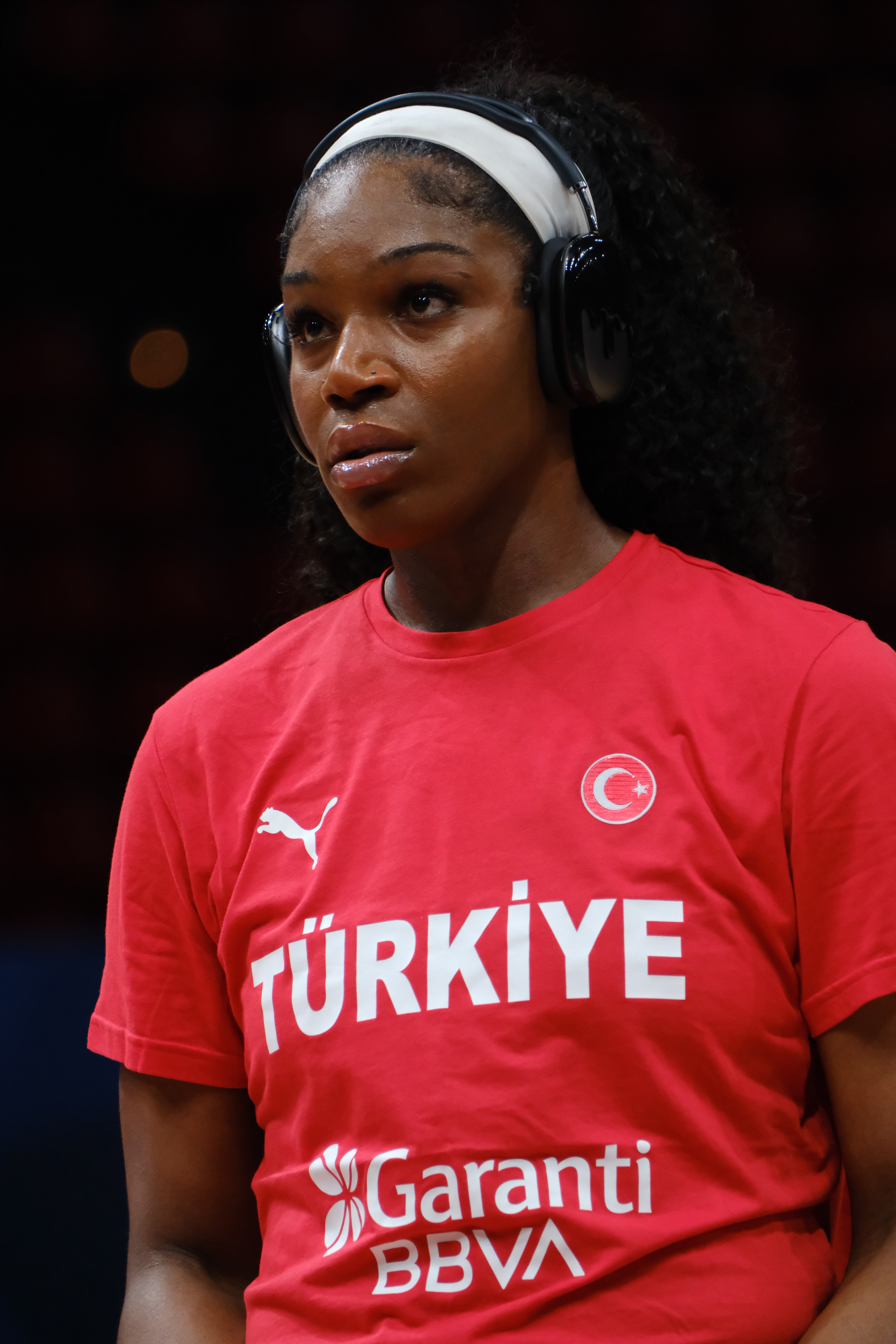
- McCowan with Turkey national team in 2025

Personal information
- Born: September 28, 1996 (age 30) Bryan, Texas, U.S.
- Listed height: 6 ft 7 in (2.01 m)
- Listed weight: 239 lb (108 kg)

Career information
- High school: Brenham (Brenham, Texas)
- College: Mississippi State (2015–2019)
- WNBA draft: 2019: 1st round, 3rd overall pick
- Drafted by: Indiana Fever
- Playing career: 2019–present
- Position: Center

Career history
- 2019–2021: Indiana Fever
- 2019–2020: Beijing Ducks
- 2021–2022: OGM Ormanspor
- 2022–2025: Dallas Wings
- 2022–2023: Galatasaray
- 2023: Beijing Ducks
- 2024: Galatasaray
- 2024–2025: Çukurova Basketbol
- 2025–2026: Fenerbahçe
- 2026: Minnesota Lynx

Career highlights
- WNBA All-Rookie Team (2019); WBCA Defensive Player of the Year (2019); Naismith Defensive Player of the Year (2018); EuroLeague champion (2026); Turkish Super League champion (2026); Turkish Presidential Cup champion (2025); 2× Turkish Cup champion (2025, 2026); 2× WBCA Coaches' All-American (2018, 2019); First-team All-American – AP, USBWA (2019); Third-team All-American – AP (2018); Gillom Trophy (2019); SEC Player of the Year (2019); 2× SEC Defensive Player of the Year (2018, 2019); SEC Tournament MVP (2019); 2× SEC All-Defensive Team (2018, 2019); 2× First-team All-SEC (2018, 2019); SEC Sixth Player of the Year (2017); SEC All-Freshman Team (2016)
- Stats at WNBA.com
- Stats at Basketball Reference
Medals
Women's basketball
Representing the United States
FIBA Under-18 Americas Championship
Gold medal – first place	2014 United States	Team

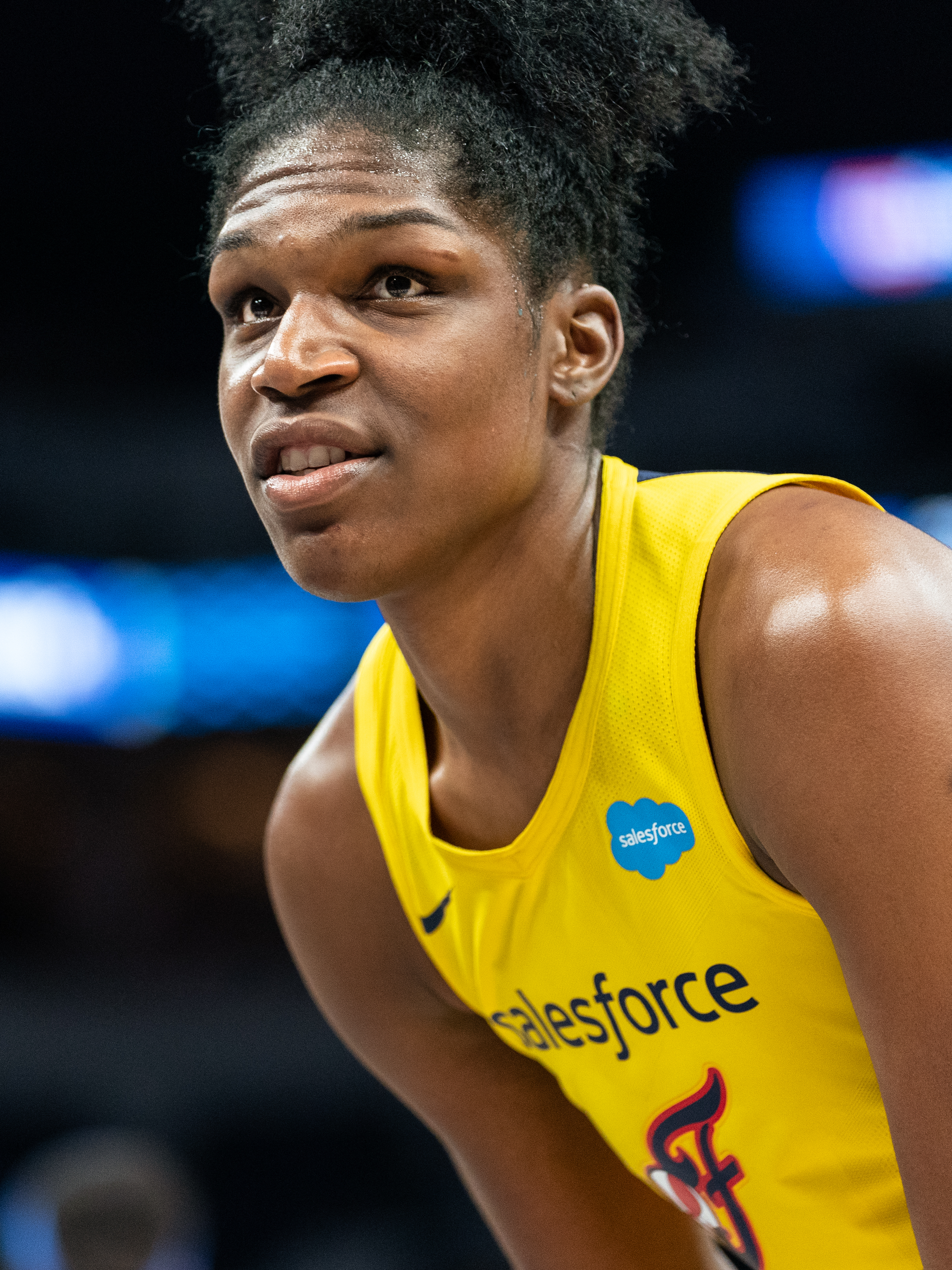
McCowan with Indiana Fever in 2019

Teaira McCowan (Turkish: Teaira Mccovan, born September 28, 1996; first name pronounced /tiːˈɛərə/ tee-AIR-ə) is Turkish-American professional basketball player who most recently played for the Minnesota Lynx of the Women's National Basketball Association (WNBA), and for Fenerbahçe of the EuroLeague Women and Turkish Super League. She played college basketball for the Mississippi State Bulldogs.

== College career ==
Following McCowan's junior season, she was named WBCA All-American, ESPNW First Team All-American and the Associated Press Third Team All-American. McCowan was also the inaugural winner of the Naismith Defensive Player of the Year Award.

On January 10, 2019, McCowan was the projected first overall pick in the 2019 WNBA draft in an ESPN mock draft. However, this particular mock draft included only college seniors and eligible international players. Later that month, ESPN compiled another mock draft, this time including draft-eligible juniors, the most notable of whom was Oregon's Sabrina Ionescu. In this second mock draft, McCowan was projected as third, but with the caveat that "if Ionescu decides to stay and play her senior season at Oregon, the whole first round looks different." This qualification proved relevant as Ionescu announced that she would remain at Oregon for 2019–20.

On January 21, 2019, she was voted as the espnW national player of the week.

== Professional career ==
=== WNBA ===
McCowan was drafted by the Indiana Fever with the third pick of the 2019 WNBA draft. In her first game for the Fever, she hit a buzzer-beating layup to deliver an 81–80 victory. Following the 2019 season in which she averaged 10 points, 9 rebounds and 1.3 blocks per game, McCowan was named to the All-Rookie Team. She was second in the league in rebounding and scored a career-high 24 points in three games.

McCowan played for the Indiana Fever for the 2019 through 2021 seasons and, after a March 2022 trade, the Dallas Wings for the 2022 through 2024 seasons.

On August 3, 2025, she was waived by the Wings.

On May 28, 2026, McCowan signed a rest-of season contract with the Minnesota Lynx. She was waived by the Lynx on June 25, 2026.

=== Overseas ===
On 1 August 2022, she signed with Galatasaray of the Turkish Women's Basketball Super League (TKBL).

On 8 January 2024, it was announced that a contract was signed with Galatasaray again.

On November 6, 2024, McCowan signed a short term deal with Çukurova Basketbol.

On October 18, 2025, McCowan signed a season-long deal with the Turkish powerhouse Fenerbahçe.

== International career ==
In November 2023, McCowan acquired Turkish citizenship and subsequently began playing for the Turkey women's national basketball team.

== Personal life ==
McCowan was born in Bryan, Texas and grew up in Brenham, Texas, where she graduated from Brenham High School. She is the daughter of Tracy Nunn and Dayronn McCowan.

== Career statistics ==
Legend
GP	Games played	GS	Games started	MPG	Minutes per game	RPG	Rebounds per game
APG	Assists per game	SPG	Steals per game	BPG	Blocks per game	PPG	Points per game
TO	Turnovers per game	FG%	Field-goal percentage	3P%	3-point field-goal percentage	FT%	Free-throw percentage
**Bold**	Career best	°	League leader

=== WNBA ===
==== Regular season ====
Stats current through the end of the 2025 season

WNBA regular season statistics
Year	Team	GP	GS	MPG	FG%	3P%	FT%	RPG	APG	SPG	BPG	TO	PPG
2019	Indiana	34	16	22.1	.517	—	.687	9.0	0.2	0.6	1.3	1.3	10.0
2020	Indiana	22	10	21.0	.536	.000	.750	7.3	0.6	0.3	1.0	2.0	10.9
2021	Indiana	32	23	**26.5**	**.537**	—	.644	**9.6**	1.1	0.6	**1.6**	1.7	11.3
2022	Dallas	33	15	18.9	.602	—	.600	7.0	0.8	0.3	0.7	1.7	11.0
2023	Dallas	30	29	26.1	.551	.000	.586	9.1	1.5	0.5	1.2	1.5	**11.9**
2024	Dallas	**39**	**38**	25.3	.570	.250	.718	8.1	**1.6**	**0.9**	0.9	2.0	11.7
2025	Dallas	17	0	12.9	.537	**.500**	**.759**	4.6	0.6	0.3	0.7	**0.9**	5.6
**Career**	7 years, 2 teams	207	131	22.6	.553	.154	.664	8.1	1.0	0.5	1.1	1.6	10.7

==== Playoffs ====
WNBA playoff statistics
Year	Team	GP	GS	MPG	FG%	3P%	FT%	RPG	APG	SPG	BPG	TO	PPG
2022	Dallas	3	1	24.7	.480	—	**.533**	9.3	1.0	0.3	**1.7**	3.3	10.7
2023	Dallas	**5**	**5**	**30.4**	**.622**	—	.522	**12.6**°	**1.6**	**0.8**	1.4	**1.8**	**11.6**
**Career'**	2 years, 1 team	8	6	28.3	.565	—	.565	11.4	1.4	0.6	1.5	2.4	11.3

=== College ===
NCAA statistics
Year	Team	GP	GS	MPG	FG%	3P%	FT%	RPG	APG	SPG	BPG	TO	PPG
2015–16	Mississippi State	35	1	13.7	.495	—	.667	5.6	0.3	0.5	1.3	1.4	6.6
2016–17	Mississippi State	**39**	6	19.7	.569	—	.611	7.1	0.5	0.8	1.5	**1.1**	8.7
2017–18	Mississippi State	**39**	**39**	**30.5**	.601	—	.633	**13.9**	0.5	0.8	2.1	2.0	18.2
2018–19	Mississippi State	36	36	29.9	**.662**	.000	**.758**	13.5	**0.9**	**0.9**	**2.4**	1.5	**18.4**
**Career**		149	82	23.6	.597	.000	.678	10.1	0.5	0.8	1.8	1.5	13.0
