= Meltem Yıldızhan =

Turkish basketball player

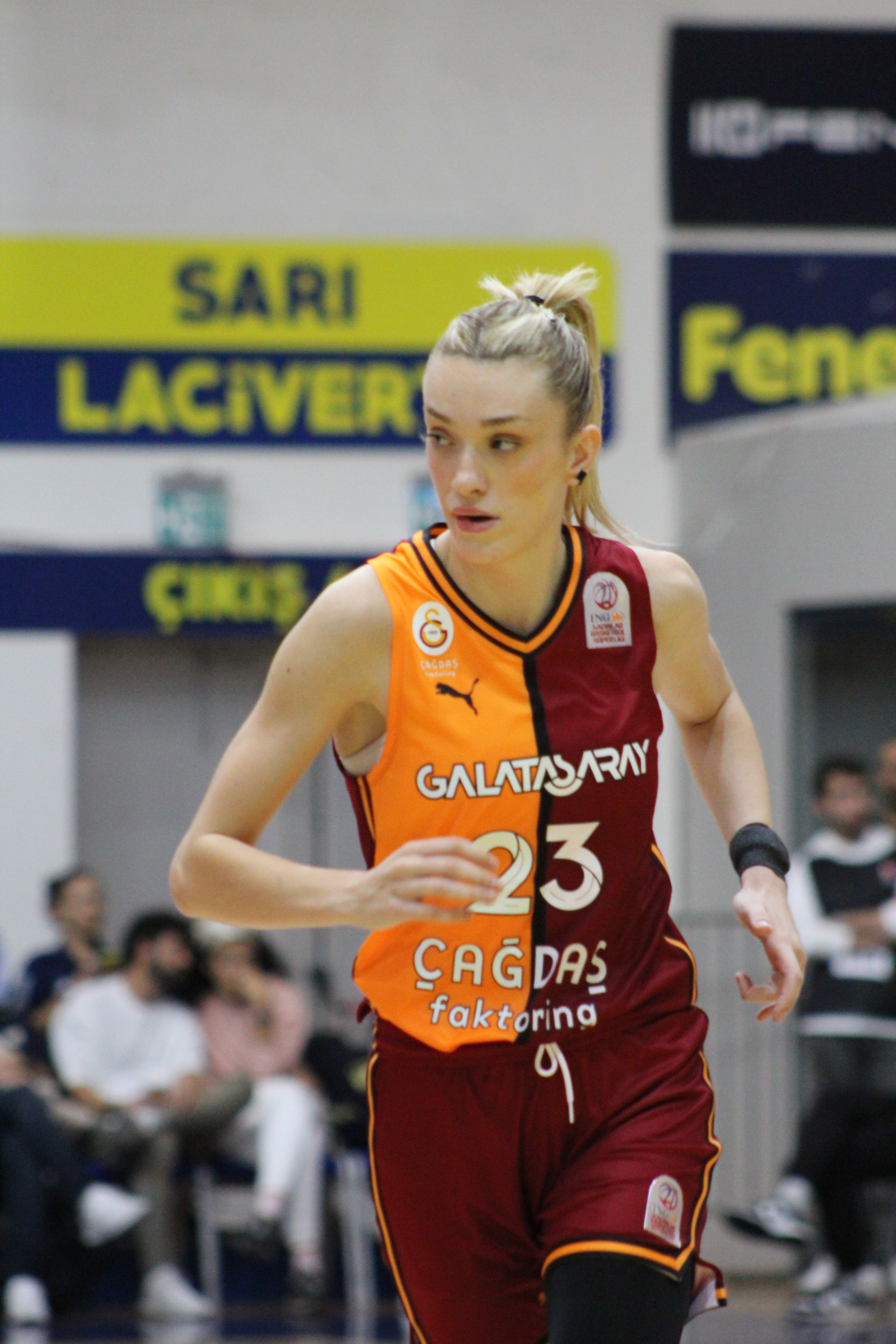

Beşiktaş
- Position: Power forward

Personal information
- Born: 5 August 1999 (age 27) Istanbul, Turkey
- Listed height: 6 ft 2 in (1.88 m)
- Listed weight: 179 lb (81 kg)

Career information
- Playing career: 2015–present

Career history
- 2015–2025: Galatasaray
- 2021–2022: → Nesibe Aydın
- 2025–: Beşiktaş

Meltem Yıldızhan (born 5 August 1999) is a Turkish female basketball player. The 1.88 m (6 ft 2 in) national plays Power forward.

== Career ==
=== Galatasaray ===
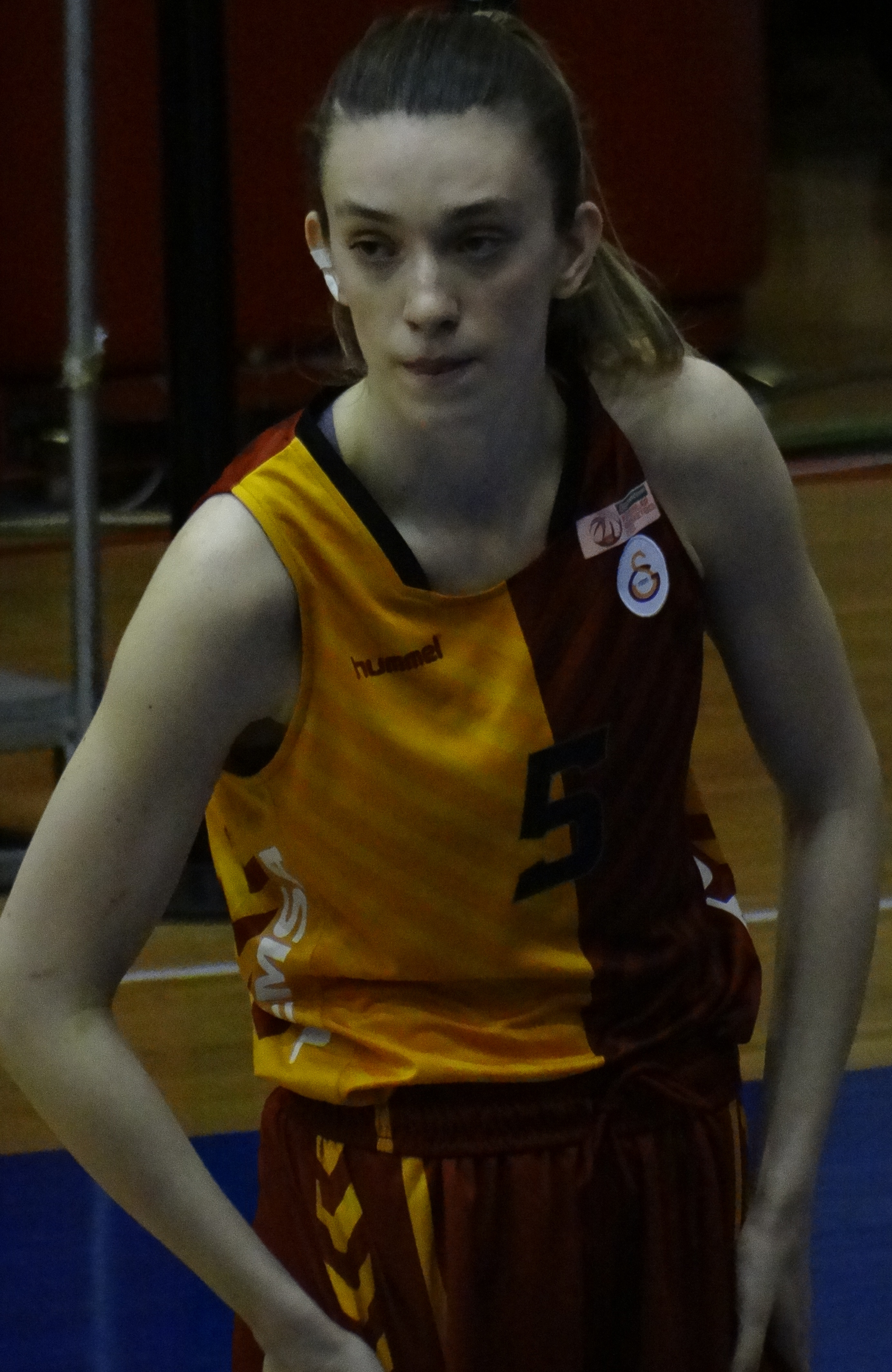
Yıldızhan in 2018

She started her basketball career in Galatasaray infrastructure. At the age of 16, she found herself a place in the Galatasaray Women's Basketball Team.

She signed a new two-year contract with Galatasaray on 25 May 2021.

==== Nesibe Aydın (loan) ====
In a statement made on May 25, 2021, it was announced that she will play in Nesibe Aydın, one of the Turkish Women's Basketball Super League teams, on loan in the 2021–22 season.

==== Return to Galatasaray ====
On 20 July 2023, Yıldızhan and Galatasaray signed a new one-year contract.

She signed another one-year contract with Galatasaray on 24 May 2024.
