= Merve Uygül =

Turkish basketball player

Merve Uygül Bostancı
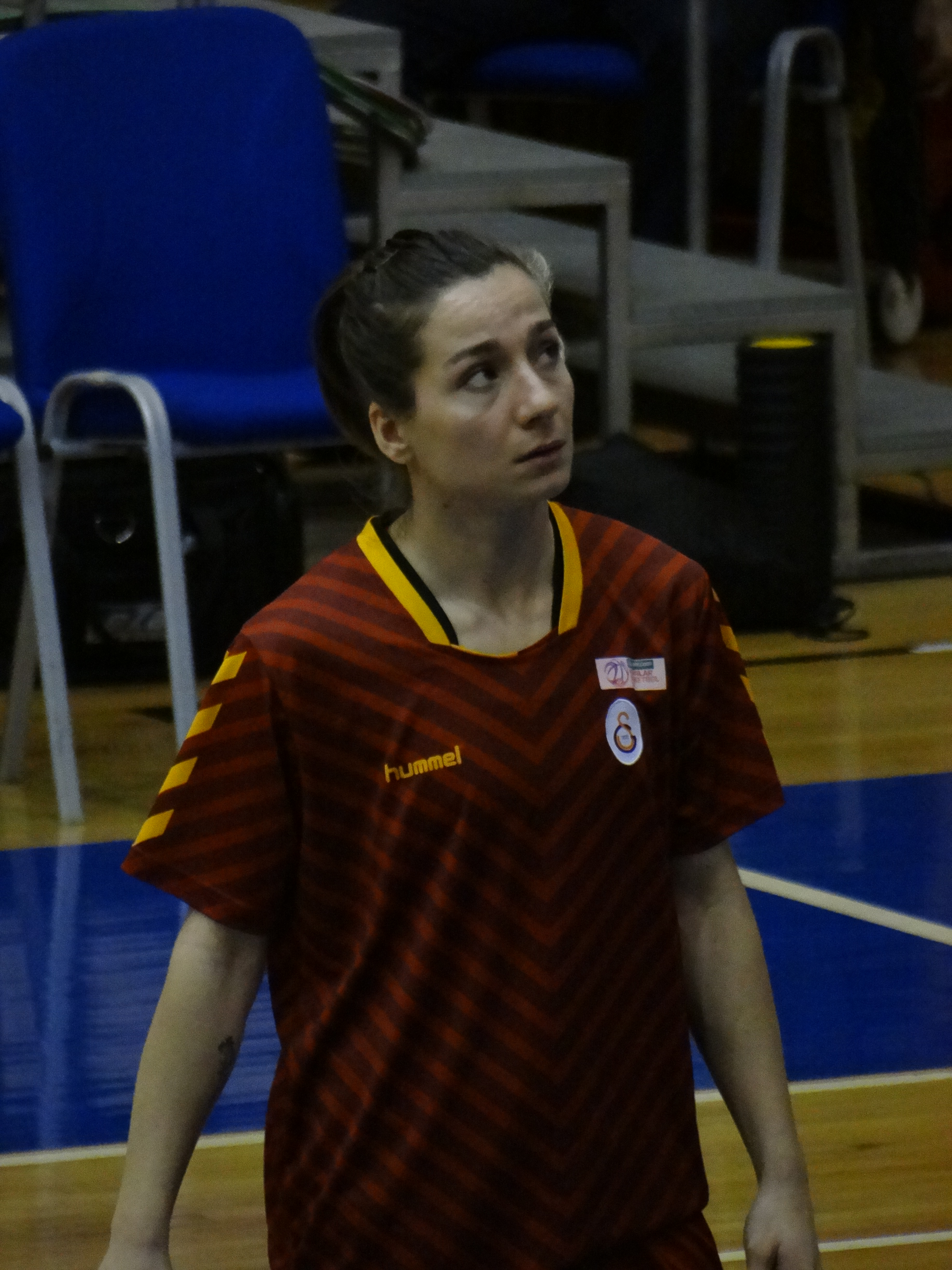

No. 46 – Tarsus Belediyesi
- Position: Point guard
- League: Women's Basketball Super League

Personal information
- Born: 30 September 1988 (age 38) Istanbul, Turkey
- Listed height: 5 ft 7 in (1.70 m)

Career information
- Playing career: 2011–present

Career history
- 2011: İzmir Konak Belediyesi Spor Kulübü
- 2012: Burhaniye Belediyesi
- 2012–2013: Dizdar
- 2013–2014: Çankaya Üniversitesi
- 2014–2015: Mersin Kurtuluş Spor
- 2015–2016: İstanbulgücü
- 2016–2017: Mersin Üniversitesi
- 2017–2018: Galatasaray
- 2018–2019: A Koleji
- 2019–2022: Nesibe Aydın GSK
- 2022–2023: Galatasaray
- 2023–: Tarsus Belediyesi

Merve Uygül (born 30 September 1988) is a Turkish female basketball player. The 1.70 m (5 ft 7 in) national plays Point guard.

== Club career ==
=== Galatasaray ===
On 8 August 2022, she signed with Galatasaray of the Turkish Women's Basketball Super League (TKBL).

Upon the expiry of her contract with Galatasaray, the club released a farewell message on July 6, 2023, thanking her for fighting "with dedication in our yellow and red jersey during our team's journey to the EuroCup final throughout the 2022-23 season.
