= Brenda Paul =

Biographical details
- Education: North Georgia College

Coaching career (HC unless noted)
- 1978–1980: Tennessee Wesleyan
- 1980–1985: Berry
- 1985–1989: Mississippi State
- 1989–1994: Georgia State
- 1994–2008: Elon
- 2009–2014: Young Harris
- 2015–present: Pfeiffer (asst.)

Head coaching record
- Overall: 507–464 (.522)

Brenda Paul is a college women's basketball coach who is currently an assistant for the Pfeiffer Falcons. She has previously been the head coach at six colleges, including Mississippi State and Elon, and has amassed over 500 career wins.

== Head coaching record ==
Record table
Season	Team	Overall	Conference	Standing	Postseason
Tennessee Wesleyan Bulldogs () (1978–1980)
1978–1979	Tennessee Wesleyan	9–13			
1979–1980	Tennessee Wesleyan	19–8			
Tennessee Wesleyan:		28–21 (.571)			
Berry (GAIAW) (1980–1985)
1980–1981	Berry	19–9			NAIA Round of 8
1981–1982	Berry	29–4			NAIA 4th place
1982–1983	Berry	29–4			
1983–1984	Berry	32–5			NAIA 4th place
1984–1985	Berry	30–6			
Berry:		139–28 (.832)			
Mississippi State Bulldogs (SEC) (1985–1989)
1985–1986	Mississippi State	8–20	0–9	10th	
1986–1987	Mississippi State	13–17	2–7	T-8th	
1987–1988	Mississippi State	19–13	2–7	8th	NWIT (1–2)
1988–1989	Mississippi State	12–16	3–6	T-7th	
Mississippi State:		52–66 (.441)	7–29 (.194)		
Georgia State Panthers (NSWAC / Trans American) (1989–1994)
1989–1990	Georgia State	8–18	5–7	T-4th	
1990–1991	Georgia State	7–21	5–7	5th	
1991–1992	Georgia State	14–15	6–6	4th	
1992–1993	Georgia State	12–16	7–5	2nd	
1993–1994	Georgia State	9–18	3–9	T-5th	
Georgia State:		50–88 (.371)	26–34 (.433)		
Elon Phoenix (SAC / Ind. / Big South / Southern) (1994–2008)
1994–1995	Elon	4–23	2–12	T-7th (SAC)	
1995–1996	Elon	17–10	7–7	4th	
1996–1997	Elon	16–11	7–7	6th	
1997–1998	Elon	12–14		Transition to DI	
1998–1999	Elon	4–23		Transition to DI	
1999–2000	Elon	14–15	6–8	5th (Big South)	
2000–2001	Elon	16–14	8–6	T-2nd	
2001–2002	Elon	15–13	10–4	2nd	
2002–2003	Elon	19–10	11–3	2nd	
2003–2004	Elon	17–12	12–8	5th (Southern)	
2004–2005	Elon	4–24	3–17	10th	
2005–2006	Elon	12–16	7–11	T-6th	
2006–2007	Elon	10–20	4–14	10th	
2007–2008	Elon	12–20	6–12	6th	
Elon:		172–225 (.433)	83–109 (.432)		
Young Harris (Ind. / Peach Belt) (2009–2014)
2010–2011	Young Harris	11–13		Transition to DII	
2011–2012	Young Harris	23–3		Transition to DII	
2012–2013	Young Harris	13–13	7–12	T-10th	
2013–2014	Young Harris	19–7	14–5	T-3rd	
Young Harris:		66–36 (.647)	21–17(.553)		
Total:		507–464 (.522)			
National champion Postseason invitational champion Conference regular season champion Conference regular season and conference tournament champion Division regular season champion Division regular season and conference tournament champion Conference tournament champion
