= Mississippi State Bulldogs women's basketball =

Women's college basketball team

| 2026–27 Mississippi State Bulldogs women's basketball team |
- University: Mississippi State University
- First season: 1974-1975
- Head coach: Sam Purcell (4th season)
- Location: Starkville, Mississippi
- Arena: Humphrey Coliseum (capacity: 10,575)
- Conference: SEC
- Nickname: Lady Bulldogs
- Colors: Maroon and white
- All-time record: 744–611 (.549)

NCAA Division I tournament runner-up
- 2017, 2018
Other NCAA Division I tournament results
| Final Four | 2017, 2018 |
| Elite Eight | 2017, 2018, 2019 |
| Sweet Sixteen | 2010, 2016, 2017, 2018, 2019 |
| Appearances | 1999, 2000, 2002, 2003, 2009, 2010, 2015, 2016, 2017, 2018, 2019, 2023, 2025 |

Conference tournament champions
- 2019

Conference regular-season champions
- 2018, 2019

Uniforms
| Home | Away |

The Mississippi State Bulldogs women's basketball program represents Mississippi State University in Starkville, Mississippi, in women's NCAA Division I basketball. The Bulldogs play in the Southeastern Conference. The program is notable for ending the UConn Huskies record 111-game winning streak by beating them 66-64 in overtime in the Final Four of the 2017 NCAA tournament. The buzzer beater shot that put the Bulldogs in front of the Huskies came from the smallest player on the court, the 5-foot-5 inch junior, Morgan William.

== Head coaches ==
| Name | Years | Record |
|---|---|---|
| Libba Birmingham | 1974–1977 | 29–38 |
| Peggy Collins | 1977–1984 | 91–103 |
| Eddie Vaughn | 1984–1985 | 8–19 |
| Brenda Paul | 1985–1989 | 52–56 |
| Jerry Henderson | 1989–1995 | 62–101 |
| Sharon Fanning-Otis | 1995–2012 | 281–232 |
| Vic Schaefer | 2012–2020 | 221–62 |
| Nikki McCray-Penson | 2020–2021 | 10–9 |
| Doug Novak (Interim) | 2021–2022 | 15–14 |
| Sam Purcell | 2022–present | 67–35 |

== Roster ==
2025–26 Mississippi State Bulldogs women's basketball team
Players
Coaches

| Pos. | # | Name | Height | Year | Previous school | Hometown |
|---|---|---|---|---|---|---|
| G | 1 | Destiney McPhaul | 5 ft 9 in (1.75 m) | RS Sr | West Catholic Preparatory HS (Pennsylvania) | Philadelphia, PA (United States) |
| G/F | 5 | Chandler Prater | 5 ft 10 in (1.78 m) | Sr | North Kansas City HS (Missouri) | Kansas City, MO (United States) |
| C | 13 | Rocío Jiménez | 6 ft 7 in (2.01 m) | RS So | Central Pointe Christian Academy | Elías Piña, Dominican Republic |
| F | tbd | Kharyssa Richardson | 6 ft 2 in (1.88 m) | Sr | Ole Miss | Douglasville, GA (United States) |
| G | tbd | Jaylah Lampley | 6 ft 1 in (1.85 m) | Fr | Lawrence Central HS (Indiana) | Indianapolis, IN (United States) |
| F | tbd | Madison Francis | 6 ft 1 in (1.85 m) | Fr | Lancaster Central HS (New York (state)) | Lancaster, NY (United States) |
| F | tbd | Nataliyah Gray | 6 ft 3 in (1.91 m) | Fr | Alief Taylor HS (Texas) | Houston, TX (United States) |

Head coach

- Sam Purcell (Auburn)

Assistant coach(es)

- Fred Castro (Oklahoma)
- Anita Howard (Armstrong State)
- Samantha Williams (Auburn)
- Victoria Vivians (Mississippi State)
- Tony Dukes (Clayton State)

Legend

- (C) Team captain
- (S) Suspended
- (I) Ineligible
- (W) Walk-on
- Injured
- Current redshirt

== Player awards ==
=== National awards ===
==== Players ====
- USBWA Freshman of the Year

LaToya Thomas – 2000

- Senior CLASS Award

LaToya Thomas – 2003

- Frances Pomeroy Naismith Award

Tan White – 2005

- Ann Meyers Drysdale Award

Victoria Vivians – 2018

- Naismith Defensive Player of the Year

Teaira McCowan – 2018

- Elite 90 Award (top GPA among upperclass players at the Final Four)

Jordan Danberry – 2018

==== Coaches ====
- Naismith Award

Vic Schaefer – 2018

- WBCA National Coach of the Year

Vic Schaefer – 2018

=== SEC awards ===
- Player of the Year

LaToya Thomas – 2002, 2003
Teaira McCowan – 2019

- Freshman of the Year

LaToya Thomas – 2000

- Defensive Player of the Year

Armelie Lumanu – 2010
Martha Alwal – 2014
Teaira McCowan – 2018, 2019

- 6th Woman of the Year

Teaira McCowan – 2017

=== Gillom Trophy ===
| Player | Winning year(s) |
|---|---|
| Alexis Rack | 2009, 2010 |
| Martha Alwal | 2013 |
| Victoria Vivians | 2015, 2016, 2017, 2018 |
| Teaira McCowan | 2019 |
| Jessika Carter | 2024 |

=== All-Americans ===
| Player | Position | Playing Years |
|---|---|---|
| LaToya Thomas | Guard | 1999–2003 |
| Tan White | Guard | 2001–2005 |
| Alexis Rack | Guard | 2006–2010 |
| Victoria Vivians | Guard | 2014–2018 |
| Morgan William | Guard | 2014–2018 |
| Teaira McCowan | Center | 2015–2019 |
Source: Mississippi State Media Guide CBS SportsespnW

== Postseason ==
=== NCAAW tournament results ===
The Bulldogs have appeared in the NCAA tournament 13 times. Their combined record is 25–13.

| Year | Seed | Round | Opponent | Result |
|---|---|---|---|---|
| 1999 | #7 | Round of 64 | #10 NC State | L 57-76 |
| 2000 | #3 | Round of 64; Round of 32 | #14 St. Peter's #11 UAB | W 94-60; L 72-78 |
| 2002 | #12 | Round of 64; Round of 32 | #5 Boston College #4 Texas Tech | W 65-59; L 55-77 |
| 2003 | #3 | Round of 64; Round of 32 | #14 Manhattan #6 New Mexico | W 73-47; L 61-73 |
| 2009 | #11 | Round of 64; Round of 32 | #6 Texas #3 Ohio State | W 71-63; L 58-64 |
| 2010 | #7 | Round of 64; Round of 32; Sweet Sixteen | #10 Middle Tennessee #2 Ohio State #3 Florida State | W 68-64; W 87-67; L 71-74 |
| 2015 | #5 | Round of 64; Round of 32 | #12 Tulane #4 Duke | W 57-47; L 56-64 |
| 2016 | #5 | Round of 64; Round of 32; Sweet Sixteen | #12 Chattanooga #4 Michigan State #1 Connecticut | W 60-50; W 74-72; L 38-98 |
| 2017 | #2 | Round of 64; Round of 32; Sweet Sixteen; Elite Eight; Final Four; National Championship | #15 Troy #7 DePaul #3 Washington #1 Baylor #1 Connecticut #1 South Carolina | W 110-69; W 92-71; W 75-64; W 94-85^{OT} W 66-64^{OT} L 55-67 |
| 2018 | #1 | Round of 64; Round of 32; Sweet Sixteen; Elite Eight; Final Four; National Championship | #16 Nicholls State #9 Oklahoma State #4 NC State #3 UCLA #1 Louisville #1 Notre Dame | W 95-50; W 71-56; W 71-57; W 89-73; W 73-63^{OT} L 58-61 |
| 2019 | #1 | Round of 64; Round of 32; Sweet Sixteen; Elite Eight | #16 Southern #9 Clemson #5 Arizona State #3 Oregon | W 103-46; W 85-61; W 76-53; L 84-88 |
| 2023 | #11 | First Four; Round of 64; Round of 32 | #11 Illinois #6 Creighton #3 Notre Dame | W 70-56; W 81-66; L 48–53 |
| 2025 | #9 | Round of 64; Round of 32 | #8 California #1 USC | W 59-46; L 59-96 |

=== WBIT tournament results ===
The Bulldogs have appeared in the WBIT 1 times. Their combined record is 2–1.

| Year | Seed | Round | Opponent | Result |
|---|---|---|---|---|
| 2024 | #2 | First Round; Second Round; Quarterfinals | Georgia Tech #3 TCU at #1 Penn State | W 84–47; W 68–61; L 87–92 |

=== WNIT / NWIT tournament results ===
The Bulldogs have appeared in the WNIT and its predecessor the NWIT 7 times with a combined record of 6-8.

| Year | Tourney | Round | Result |
|---|---|---|---|
| 1988 | NWIT | Third Round | 1-2 |
| 1998 | WNIT | First Round | 0-1 |
| 2001 | WNIT | Third Round | 2-1 |
| 2005 | WNIT | First Round | 0-1 |
| 2007 | WNIT | Third Round | 1-1 |
| 2008 | WNIT | Second Round | 0-1 |
| 2014 | WNIT | Third Round | 2-1 |

== See also ==
Mississippi State Bulldogs women's basketball statistical leaders
