= PF Umbertide =

- Nickname: Fratta, Leonesse
- Leagues: Serie A2
- Founded: 2008; 18 years ago
- History: Basket Club Fratta; 1964-2008; P.F. Umbertide; 2008–present
- Arena: PalaMorandi,
- Capacity: 1,100
- Location: Umbertide, Italy
- Main sponsor: La Bottega del Tartufo
- President: Paolo Betti
- Head coach: Alessandro Contu
- Championships: 1 A2 League
- Website: pfumbertide.it

Pallacanestro Femminile Umbertide, better known as PF Umbertide, is an Italian women's basketball team from the town of Umbertide.

Since 2008 to 2017 the team played in the first League (Serie A1). After the 2017–18 season, the team decided to join the A2 League (Serie A2).

== Club ==
- (Italy) Dott. Paolo Betti - President
- (Italy) Francesca Fondacci - Secretary
- (Italy) Salvatore Fioretto – Logistics
- (Italy) Cristian Marconi – Logistics

=== Staff ===
- (Italy) Alessandro Contu - Head coach
- (Hungary) Katalin Honti - Assistant Coach
- (Italy) Michele Crispoltoni - Assistant Coach
- (Italy) Simone Tosti - Assistant Coach
- (Italy) Gianluca Carboni - Athletic trainer
- (Italy) Andrea Raschi - Physioterapist
- (Italy) Filippo Mariotti- Physioterapist
- (Italy) Lucia Pigliapoco – Physioterapist
- (Italy) Valerio Mencagli – Statistics
- (Italy) Dott. Carlo Tramontana – Doctor

== Supporters ==
PF Umbertide has a group of supporters named Supporters Fratta
