= 2025–26 Galatasaray S.K. (women's basketball) season =

Women's basketball season

Galatasaray Çağdaş Faktoring
2025–26 season
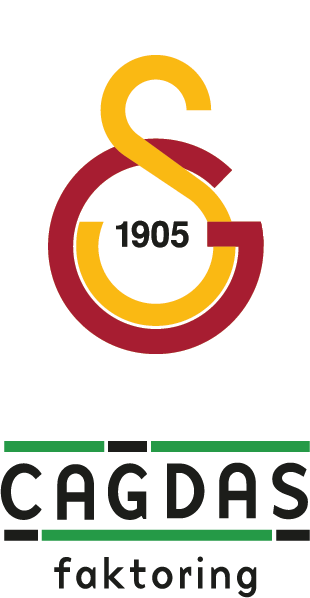
- President: Dursun Özbek
- Head coach: Ekrem Memnun (until 14 November 2025); Hasan Fırat Okul (from 22 November 2025)
- Arena: Sinan Erdem Dome
- Women's Basketball Super League: 2nd seed
- Playoffs: Runners-up
- EuroLeague Women: Runners-up
- Turkish Women's Basketball Cup: Runners-up

The 2025–26 season is Galatasaray's 71st season in the existence of the club. The team plays in the Women's Basketball Super League and in the EuroLeague Women.

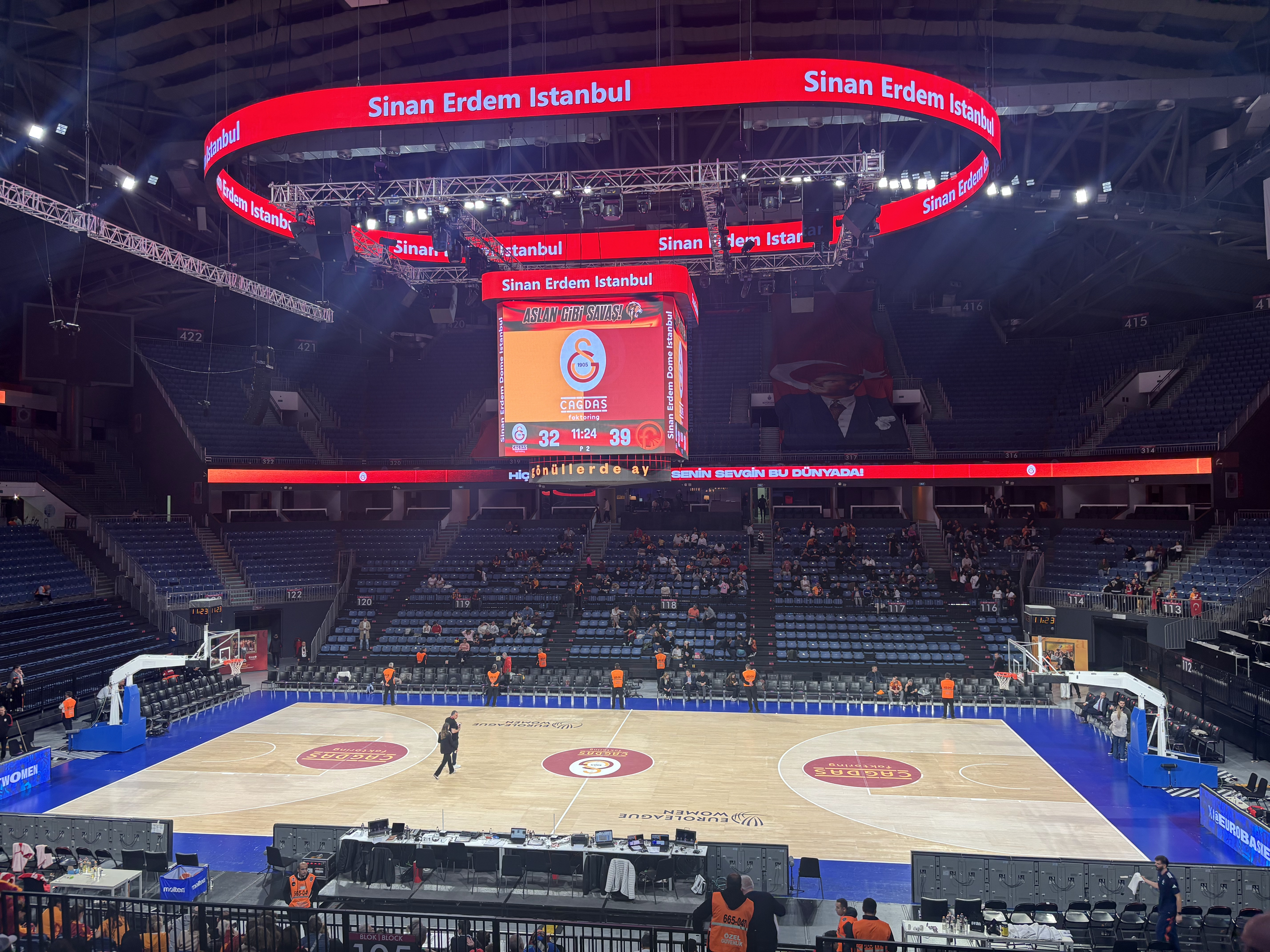
Galatasaray Çağdaş Faktoring - Beretta Famila Schio - 9 October 2025 - EuroLeague Women - Sinan Erdem Dome

== Season overview ==
=== Pre-season ===
On 2 July, Hasan Fırat Okul was appointed as assistant coach for the 2025–26 season.

The EuroLeague Women 2025–26 season draw took place in Munich, Germany, on July 23, 2025. Galatasaray women's basketball team's opponent in the qualifying round, which determined the qualifying and regular season group stages, was Romanian team ACS Sepsi SIC.

On 4 August, Galatasaray started preparations for the new season with training at the Basketball Development Center.

On 19 August, Turkish Women's Basketball Super League 2025–26 Season fixtures have been announced.

=== April ===
On April 18, Dorka Juhász was named the MVP of the 2025–26 EuroLeague Women season. The 26 year-old is the youngest ever recipient of the award and has attained a performance efficiency valuation of 16.8 after shooting 52 percent from the field en-route to 12.8 points per game - along with 8.0 rebounds per outing.

== Players ==
=== Current roster ===
Galatasaray roster
Players
Coaches

Pos.	No.	Nat.	Name	Ht.	Wt.	Age
PG	0	(United States) (Bosnia and Herzegovina)	Smalls, Kamiah (DC)	1.78 m (5 ft 10 in)		28 – 17 April 1998
C	1	(United States) (Nigeria)	Williams, Elizabeth (DC)	1.91 m (6 ft 3 in)	91 kg (201 lb)	33 – 23 June 1993
PG	3	(Slovenia)	Oblak, Teja	1.73 m (5 ft 8 in)		35 – 20 December 1990
SF	5	(Turkey)	Yılmaz, Sude	1.82 m (6 ft 0 in)		24 – 15 March 2002
PG	6	(Turkey)	Fitik, Gökşen	1.75 m (5 ft 9 in)		25 – 11 August 2001
SF	7	(Turkey)	Çidal, Sehernaz	1.83 m (6 ft 0 in)		31 – 18 April 1995
SG	8	(Turkey)	Cora, Ayşe (C)	1.75 m (5 ft 9 in)	69 kg (152 lb)	33 – 3 March 1993
PG	11	(Turkey)	Erdoğan, Derin	1.68 m (5 ft 6 in)		24 – 28 June 2002
PF	12	(Turkey)	Gül, Zeynep Şevval	1.93 m (6 ft 4 in)		25 – 1 January 2001
F	14	(Hungary)	Juhász, Dorka	1.96 m (6 ft 5 in)	91 kg (201 lb)	26 – 18 December 1999
F	17	(Turkey)	Bayram, Elif	1.87 m (6 ft 2 in)		25 – 18 September 2001
PG	21	(Turkey)	Şahin, Berna	1.70 m (5 ft 7 in)		23 – 21 January 2003
G	23	(France)	Johannès, Marine	1.78 m (5 ft 10 in)	61 kg (134 lb)	31 – 21 January 1995
PF	34	(Finland)	Kuier, Awak	1.95 m (6 ft 5 in)		25 – 19 August 2001

Head coach

- (Turkey) Hasan Fırat Okul

Assistant coach(es)

- (Turkey) Murat Tuna
- (Turkey) Onur Berber

Athletic trainer(s)

- (Turkey) Semih Eroğlu
- (Turkey) Serkan Bodur

Physiotherapist(s)

- (Turkey) Mümin Balcıoğulları

Team manager

- (Turkey) Melahat Aydın

Legend

- (C) Team captain
- (DC) Dual citizenship
- Injured

- Roster
Updated: 12 December 2025

=== Depth chart ===
Pos.	Starting 5	Bench 1	Bench 2	Bench 3
C	Elizabeth Williams	Dorka Juhász
PF	Awak Kuier	Elif Bayram	Zeynep Şevval Gül
SF	Marine Johannès	Ayşe Cora	Sehernaz Çidal	Sude Yılmaz
SG	Kamiah Smalls	Derin Erdoğan
PG	Teja Oblak	Gökşen Fitik	Berna Şahin

(colours: Turkish or homegrown players; foreign players)

=== Transactions ===
==== Players In ====
No.	Pos.	Nat.	Name	Age	Moving from		Type	Ends	Transfer fee	Date	Source
34	F	(Finland)	Awak Kuier	23	Reyer Venezia	(Italy)	1 years	June 2026	Free	4 June 2025	
17	PF	(Turkey)	Elif Bayram	23	Beşiktaş BOA	(Turkey)	1 years	June 2026	Free	6 June 2025	
3	PG	(Slovenia)	Teja Oblak	34	ZVVZ USK Praha	(Czech Republic)	1 years	June 2026	Free	9 June 2025	
0	PG	(United States) (Bosnia and Herzegovina)	Kamiah Smalls	27	Reyer Venezia	(Italy)	1 years	June 2026	Free	11 June 2025	
7	SF	(Turkey)	Sehernaz Çidal	30	Emlak Konut	(Turkey)	1 years	June 2026	Free	14 June 2025	
14	F	(Hungary)	Dorka Juhász	25	Famila Basket Schio	(Italy)	1 years	June 2026	Free	16 June 2025	
1	C	(United States) (Nigeria)	Elizabeth Williams	31	Chicago Sky	(United States)	1 years	June 2026	Free	19 June 2025	
12	PF	(Turkey)	Zeynep Şevval Gül	24	OGM Ormanspor	(Turkey)	1 years	June 2026	Free	26 June 2025	
23	G	(France)	Marine Johannès	30	New York Liberty	(United States)	1 years	June 2026	Free	27 June 2025	

==== Players Out ====
No.	Pos.	Nat.	Name	Age	Moving to		Type	Transfer fee	Date	Source
7	PG	(Turkey)	Ayşegül Günay	32	Botaş	(Turkey)	End of contract	Free	6 May 2025	
1	PF	(Turkey)	Selin Rachel Gül	21	Botaş	(Turkey)	End of contract	Free	6 May 2025	
23	F	(Turkey)	Meltem Yıldızhan	25	Beşiktaş BOA	(Turkey)	End of contract	Free	6 May 2025	
13	C	(Turkey) (United States)	Quanitra Hollingsworth	36			End of contract	Free	6 May 2025	
9	C	(South Korea)	Park Ji-su	26	Cheongju KB Stars	(South Korea)	End of contract	Free	28 May 2025	
12	C	(Latvia)	Anete Šteinberga	35	Famila Basket Schio	(Italy)	End of contract	Free	28 May 2025	
24	SF	(Italy)	Cecilia Zandalasini	29	Golden State Valkyries	(United States)	End of contract	Free	28 May 2025	
28	C	(China)	Li Yueru	26	Seattle Storm	(United States)	End of contract	Free	28 May 2025	
35	PG	(Belgium)	Julie Vanloo	32	Golden State Valkyries	(United States)	End of contract	Free	28 May 2025	

==== Contract extension ====
No.	Pos.	Nat.	Name	Age	Cont.	Date	Source
8	SG	(Turkey)	Ayşe Cora	32	1-year	16 May 2025	
5	SF	(Turkey)	Sude Yılmaz	23	1-year	16 May 2025	
6	PG	(Turkey)	Gökşen Fitik	23	1-year	16 May 2025	
11	PG	(Turkey)	Derin Erdoğan	22	1-year	16 May 2025	

== Club ==
=== Technical Staff ===
As of 12 December 2025

Staff member	Position
Işıl Alben	General Coordinator
Melahat Aydın	Administrative Manager
Beril Kefeli	Foreign Relations Officer
Hasan Fırat Okul	Head Coach
Murat Tuna	Assistant Coach
Onur Berber	Assistant Coach
Tolgahan Korkmaz	Doctor
Semih Eroğlu	Conditioner
Serkan Bodur	Conditioner
Zerrin Hatacıkoğlu	Masseuse
Osman Aşbay	Masseur
Mümin Balcıoğulları	Physiotherapist
İbrahim Kalkan	Media and Communications Officer
Alaaddin Akkoyun	Equipment Manager
Özcan Kör	Operation

=== Staff changes ===
Change	Date	Staff member	Staff position	Ref.
Out	14 November 2025	(Turkey) Ekrem Memnun	Head Coach	
Out	15 November 2025	(Turkey) Ege Talay	Assistant Coach	
In	22 November 2025	(Turkey) Hasan Fırat Okul	Head Coach	
In	22 November 2025	(Turkey) Murat Tuna	Assistant Coach	
In	December 2025	(Turkey) Onur Berber	Assistant Coach	

=== Uniform ===
Home	Away	Third

=== Sponsorship and kit manufacturers ===
- Supplier: Puma
- Name sponsor: Çağdaş Faktoring
- Main sponsor: Çağdaş Faktoring
- Back sponsor: TikTak
- Sleeve sponsor: —
- Lateral sponsor: —
- Short sponsor: —
- Socks sponsor: —

== Pre-season and friendlies ==
8 September 2025 Friendly	Galatasaray Çağdaş Faktoring	78–62	Beşiktaş BOA	Ataköy, Istanbul, Turkey
15:30 TRT (UTC+3)
		Boxscore		Arena: Sinan Erdem Dome

10 September 2025 Friendly	Olympiacos	64–78	Galatasaray Çağdaş Faktoring	Attica, Greece
14:00 TRT (UTC+3)
		Boxscore		Arena: Peace and Friendship Stadium

== Competitions ==
=== Overall ===
Competition	Started round	Final position / round	First match	Last match
Women's Basketball Super League	Round 1	2nd	5 October 2025	28 February 2026
Women's Basketball Super League Playoffs	Quarterfinals	Runners-up	6 March 2026	4 April 2026
EuroLeague Women	Qualification round	Runners-up	17 September 2025	19 April 2026
Turkish Women's Basketball Cup	Quarterfinals	Runners-up	7 January 2026	11 January 2026

Updated to match played 20 April 2026
Source: Competitions

=== Overview ===
Competition	Record							
Competition	Pld	W	D	L	PF	PA	PD	Win %
Women's Basketball Super League	20	17	0	3	1,482	1,183	+299	85.00
Women's Basketball Super League Playoffs	7	4	0	3	568	535	+33	57.14
EuroLeague Women	19	15	0	4	1,404	1,188	+216	78.95
Turkish Women's Basketball Cup	3	2	0	1	209	218	−9	66.67
Total	49	38	0	11	3,663	3,124	+539	77.55

Last updated: 20 April 2026
Source: Competitions

=== Women's Basketball Super League ===
==== Regular season ====
Pos	Team	Pld	W	L	PF	PA	PD	Pts	Qualification
1	Fenerbahçe	20	20	0	1778	1261	+517	40	Advance to playoffs
2	Galatasaray	20	17	3	1482	1183	+299	37	Advance to playoffs
3	Emlak Konut SK	20	14	6	1495	1290	+205	34	Advance to playoffs
4	ÇBK Mersin	20	14	6	1578	1343	+235	34	Advance to playoffs
5	Beşiktaş	20	11	9	1485	1446	+39	31	Advance to playoffs
6	Botaş	20	11	9	1532	1448	+84	31	Advance to playoffs
7	Nesibe Aydın	20	11	9	1514	1478	+36	31	Advance to playoffs
8	Kayseri Basketbol	20	6	14	1328	1502	−174	26	Advance to playoffs
9	Ormanspor	20	4	16	1211	1513	−302	24	
10	Çanakkale Belediyespor	20	2	18	1217	1756	−539	22	
11	Kocaeli Women's Basketball (Note: On 28 November 2025, Kocaeli Women's Basketball withdrew from the league.)	20	0	20	0	400	−400	0	Relegation to TKBL

Source: KBSL
Rules for classification: 1) Points; 2) Points difference; 3) Points scored.

==== Results summary ====
Overall						Home					Away				
Pld	W	L	PF	PA	PD	W	L	PF	PA	PD	W	L	PF	PA	PD
20	17	3	1482	1183	+299	9	1	762	582	+180	8	2	720	601	+119

Last updated: 28 February 2026.
Source: TBF.org.tr

==== Results by round ====
Round	1	2	3	4	5	6	7	8	9	10	11	12	13	14	15	16	17	18	19	20	21	22
Ground	H	A	H	A	H	A	H	A	B	A	H	A	H	A	H	A	H	A	H	B	H	A
Result	W	W	W	W	W	L	L	W	B	W	W	W	W	W	W	W	W	L	W	B	W	W
Position	4	2	2	1	1	1	2	2	3	2	2	2	2	2	2	2	2	2	2	2	2	2

Updated to match(es) played on 28 February 2026. Source: TBF.org.tr
A = Away; H = Home; B = Bye; W = Win; L = Loss; C = Canceled

==== Matches ====
5 October 2025 1	Galatasaray Çağdaş Faktoring	80–68	OGM Ormanspor	Ataköy, Istanbul, Turkey
16:00 TRT (UTC+3)	Scoring by quarter: 22–15, 21–19, 20–16, 17–18
	Pts: Smalls, Bayram 16; Rebs: Bayram 11; Asts: Oblak 6 PIR: Bayram 27	Boxscore; Report	Pts: DeShields 19; Rebs: Anigwe 7 Asts: Gezgin, Erat 4 PIR: DeShields 23	Arena: Sinan Erdem Dome; Attendance: 500; Referees: Turgut Işık, Özkan Talo, Enes Duran

12 October 2025 2	Beşiktaş BOA	67–75	Galatasaray Çağdaş Faktoring	Beşiktaş, Istanbul, Turkey
16:00 TRT (UTC+3)	Scoring by quarter: 26–17, 14–24, 9–15, 18–19
	Pts: Okonkwo 17; Rebs: Fasoula 9 Asts: Bilgiç 7 PIR: Bilgiç 19	Boxscore; Report	Pts: Fitik 15; Rebs: Williams 8 Asts: Cora 5 PIR: Williams 21	Arena: BJK Akatlar Arena; Attendance: 1,000; Referees: Umut Özgün Ergün, Furkan Keseratar, Burak Pehlivan

18 October 2025 3	Galatasaray Çağdaş Faktoring	75–52	Melikgazi Kayseri Basketbol	Ataköy, Istanbul, Turkey
17:00 TRT (UTC+3)	Scoring by quarter: 19–18, 22–19, 15–4, 19–11
	Pts: Smalls 12; Rebs: Juhász 10; Asts: six players 3 PIR: Juhász 17	Boxscore; Report	Pts: Collier 13; Rebs: Collier 9 Asts: Dangerfield, Yılmaz 6 PIR: Yılmaz 17	Arena: Sinan Erdem Dome; Attendance: 500; Referees: Aydın Karaçam, Mustafa Candemir Tabak, Furkan Köse

26 October 2025 4	Çimsa ÇBK Mersin	71–75	Galatasaray Çağdaş Faktoring	Yenişehir, Mersin, Turkey
16:00 TRT (UTC+3)	Scoring by quarter: 20–20, 18–15, 19–16, 14–24
	Pts: Geiselsöder 22; Rebs: Hayes, Ural 6 Asts: Hayes, Vanloo 6 PIR: Geiselsöder 22	Boxscore; Report	Pts: Juhász 24; Rebs: Kuier 9 Asts: Oblak 8 PIR: Juhász 19	Arena: Servet Tazegül Arena; Attendance: 1,300; Referees: Turgut Işık, Mesut Öztürk, Ahmet Kemal Digilli

1 November 2025 5	Galatasaray Çağdaş Faktoring	87–76	Nesibe Aydın	Ataköy, Istanbul, Turkey
13:00 TRT (UTC+3)	Scoring by quarter: 25–15, 21–24, 19–20, 22–17
	Pts: Smalls, Kuier 17; Rebs: Williams 8 Asts: Erdoğan 8 PIR: Kuier 21	Boxscore; Report	Pts: Green 22; Rebs: Bone 7 Asts: Green 6 PIR: Green 19	Arena: Sinan Erdem Dome; Attendance: 402; Referees: Fatih Güler, Yiğit Emre Şimşek, Kadir Giray Esen

8 November 2025 6	Emlak Konut	74–68	Galatasaray Çağdaş Faktoring	Başakşehir, Istanbul, Turkey
18:00 TRT (UTC+3)	Scoring by quarter: 22–15, 17–17, 20–20, 15–16
	Pts: Thomas 23; Rebs: Macaulay 15; Asts: Thomas 6 PIR: Thomas, Macaulay 19	Boxscore; Report	Pts: Kuier 19; Rebs: Williams 10; Asts: Oblak, Erdoğan 4 PIR: Williams, Kuier 20	Arena: Başakşehir Spor Kompleksi; Attendance: 200; Referees: Ozan Gönen, Hasan Ok, İsmail Bayram

23 November 2025 7	Galatasaray Çağdaş Faktoring	71–75	Fenerbahçe Opet	Ataköy, Istanbul, Turkey
18:30 TRT (UTC+3)	Scoring by quarter: 15–21, 14–21, 22–15, 20–18
	Pts: Smalls 21; Rebs: Juhász 7 Asts: Oblak 5 PIR: Smalls 28	Boxscore; Report	Pts: Rupert 20; Rebs: Meesseman 8 Asts: Meesseman 6 PIR: Rupert 19	Arena: Sinan Erdem Dome; Attendance: 1,311; Referees: Önder Yılmaz, Berk Kurtulmuş, Burak Erkan

29 November 2025 8	Kocaeli Kadın Basketbol	0–20	Galatasaray Çağdaş Faktoring	İzmit, Kocaeli, Turkey
15:00 TRT (UTC+3)
		Boxscore; Report		Arena: Şehit Polis Recep Topaloğlu Spor Salonu; Referees: İsmail Binbir, Selena Gamze Öget Çerçi, Burak Aktaş

9	Bye

14 December 2025 10	Dardanel Çanakkale Belediyespor	64–96	Galatasaray Çağdaş Faktoring	Çanakkale, Turkey
16:00 TRT (UTC+3)	Scoring by quarter: 16–26, 11–22, 12–19, 25–29
	Pts: Mandıracı 15; Rebs: Tokmak 10; Asts: Gültekin 6 PIR: Mandıracı 20	Boxscore; Report	Pts: Erdoğan 16; Rebs: Williams, Kuier 9 Asts: Johannès 5 PIR: Kuier 25	Arena: Çanakkale Sporcu Gelişim Merkezi; Attendance: 526; Referees: Barış Turgut, Sezer Bor, Rahmi Güner

20 December 2025 11	Galatasaray Çağdaş Faktoring	90–58	Botaş	Ataköy, Istanbul, Turkey
14:00 TRT (UTC+3)	Scoring by quarter: 25–7, 21–21, 23–20, 21–10
	Pts: Kuier 16; Rebs: Kuier 10; Asts: Fitik 6 PIR: Kuier 26	Boxscore; Report	Pts: Poyraz 12; Rebs: Poyraz, Scherf 7 Asts: Bejedi 6 PIR: Poyraz, Dantas 12	Arena: Sinan Erdem Dome; Attendance: 200; Referees: İbrahim Altıntaş, Selena Gamze Öget Çerçi, Buğra Çağatay Savaş

24 December 2025 12	OGM Ormanspor	63–67	Galatasaray Çağdaş Faktoring	Yenimahalle, Ankara, Turkey
14:00 TRT (UTC+3)	Scoring by quarter: 19–18, 20–16, 11–12, 13–21
	Pts: DeShields 19; Rebs: Fraser 8 Asts: Özen 5 PIR: Erat 18	Boxscore; Report	Pts: Juhász 25; Rebs: Juhász 11; Asts: Oblak 5 PIR: Juhász 29	Arena: M. Sait Zarifoğlu Spor Salonu; Attendance: 200; Referees: Yiğit Gönültaş, Oğuzhan Güzel, Süleyman Tepe

27 December 2025 13	Galatasaray Çağdaş Faktoring	84–73	Beşiktaş BOA	Ataköy, Istanbul, Turkey
16:30 TRT (UTC+3)	Scoring by quarter: 20–13, 22–26, 22–12, 20–22
	Pts: Cora 14; Rebs: Kuier 8 Asts: Oblak 5 PIR: Cora 17	Boxscore; Report	Pts: Whitcomb 18; Rebs: Fasoula 6 Asts: Whitcomb 4 PIR: Whitcomb 18	Arena: Sinan Erdem Dome; Attendance: 818; Referees: Berk Kurtulmuş, Metehan Alaçam, Ali Rıza Pinat

30 December 2025 14	Melikgazi Kayseri Basketbol	70–95	Galatasaray Çağdaş Faktoring	Kocasinan, Kayseri, Turkey
17:30 TRT (UTC+3)	Scoring by quarter: 20–27, 20–29, 15–20, 15–19
	Pts: Kunek 19; Rebs: Kunek 8 Asts: Kunek, Arı 4 PIR: Kunek 25	Boxscore; Report	Pts: Kuier 15; Rebs: Smalls 7 Asts: Erdoğan 6 PIR: three players 18	Arena: Kadir Has Spor Salonu; Attendance: 700; Referees: Barış Turgut, Cemil Uygül, Kamil Alok

3 January 2026 15	Galatasaray Çağdaş Faktoring	79–68	Çimsa ÇBK Mersin	Ataköy, Istanbul, Turkey
17:00 TRT (UTC+3)	Scoring by quarter: 18–20, 24–15, 21–14, 16–19
	Pts: Cora 16; Rebs: Bayram 8 Asts: Oblak, Fitik 5 PIR: Kuier 16	Boxscore; Report	Pts: Burke 15; Rebs: Ataş 7 Asts: Vanloo 4 PIR: Ataş 17	Arena: Sinan Erdem Dome; Attendance: 571; Referees: Umut Özgün Ergün, Benhür İrcel, Erdoğan Çelebi

17 January 2026 16	Nesibe Aydın	64–79	Galatasaray Çağdaş Faktoring	Söğütözü, Ankara, Turkey
16:00 TRT (UTC+3)	Scoring by quarter: 24–25, 14–14, 11–15, 15–25
	Pts: Bone 17; Rebs: Davis 11; Asts: Green, Önal 3 PIR: Davis 21	Boxscore; Report	Pts: Kuier 19; Rebs: Kuier 11; Asts: Fitik 6 PIR: Kuier 26	Arena: TOBB Sport Hall; Attendance: 350; Referees: Hüseyin Çamcı, Nihat Çetin, Rahmi Güner

25 January 2026 17	Galatasaray Çağdaş Faktoring	64–60	Emlak Konut	Ataköy, Istanbul, Turkey
15:30 TRT (UTC+3)	Scoring by quarter: 19–17, 10–13, 18–15, 17–15
	Pts: Johannès 17; Rebs: Juhász 10; Asts: Bayram, Erdoğan 3 PIR: Juhász 18	Boxscore; Report	Pts: Thomas 23; Rebs: Macaulay 12; Asts: Thomas 7 PIR: Thomas 22	Arena: Sinan Erdem Dome; Attendance: 550; Referees: Mesut Öztürk, Niyazi Yasin Kahraman, Yasin Alkan

1 February 2026 18	Fenerbahçe Opet	75–70	Galatasaray Çağdaş Faktoring	Ataşehir, Istanbul, Turkey
18:00 TRT (UTC+3)	Scoring by quarter: 23–25, 14–11, 22–18, 16–16
	Pts: Çakır 13; Rebs: McCowan 8 Asts: McBride 8 PIR: McBride 20	Boxscore; Report	Pts: Kuier 28; Rebs: Williams 6 Asts: Erdoğan 8 PIR: Kuier 23	Arena: Metro Enerji Sports Hall; Attendance: 950; Referees: Orkun Yurttaş, Aydın Karaçam, Ali Rıza Pinat

6 February 2026 19	Galatasaray Çağdaş Faktoring	20–0	Kocaeli Kadın Basketbol	Ataköy, Istanbul, Turkey
		Boxscore		Arena: Sinan Erdem Dome

20	Bye

22 February 2026 21	Galatasaray Çağdaş Faktoring	112–52	Dardanel Çanakkale Belediyespor	Zeytinburnu, Istanbul
14:00 TRT (UTC+3)	Scoring by quarter: 29–10, 23–23, 30–11, 30–8
	Pts: Gül 26; Rebs: Bayram 10; Asts: Fitik 6 PIR: Gül 29	Boxscore; Report	Pts: Yalçın 22; Rebs: three players 3 Asts: Tongar 7 PIR: Yalçın 20	Arena: Basketbol Gelişim Merkezi; Attendance: 235; Referees: Ozan Gönen, Ali Küçükerdem, Halil Ata Günal

28 February 2026 22	Botaş	53–75	Galatasaray Çağdaş Faktoring	Altındağ, Ankara, Turkey
13:30 TRT (UTC+3)	Scoring by quarter: 18–15, 17–27, 2–15, 16–18
	Pts: Günay 10; Rebs: Poyraz 12; Asts: Bejedi 5 PIR: Poyraz 12	Boxscore; Report	Pts: Erdoğan 14; Rebs: Bayram 13; Asts: Bayram, Johannès 5 PIR: Bayram 24	Arena: Ankara Arena; Attendance: 300; Referees: Aydın Karaçam, Buğra Çağatay Savaş, Kerem Altıntaş

==== Quarterfinals ====
6 March 2026 1	Galatasaray Çağdaş Faktoring	86–61 (Series: 1–0)	Nesibe Aydın	Ataköy, Istanbul, Turkey
13:00 TRT (UTC+3)	Scoring by quarter: 16–22, 28–14, 23–17, 19–8
	Pts: Smalls 18; Rebs: Bayram 8 Asts: Fitik 7 PIR: Smalls 21	Boxscore; Report	Pts: Green 15; Rebs: three players 5 Asts: Davis 6 PIR: Davis 18	Arena: Sinan Erdem Dome; Attendance: 100; Referees: Ahmet Taner İbin, Nihat Çetin, Erdoğan Çelebi

21 March 2026 2	Nesibe Aydın	75–94 (Series: 0–2)	Galatasaray Çağdaş Faktoring	Söğütözü, Ankara, Turkey
16:30 TRT (UTC+3)	Scoring by quarter: 20–30, 20–19, 20–19, 15–26
	Pts: Green 22; Rebs: Davis 13; Asts: Green 6 PIR: Davis 29	Boxscore; Report	Pts: Williams 21; Rebs: Williams 8 Asts: Cora 10; PIR: Williams 28	Arena: TOBB Sport Hall; Attendance: 200; Referees: Barış Turgut, Melikşah Mercan, Aygün Akgül

==== Semifinals ====
24 March 2026 1	Galatasaray Çağdaş Faktoring	82–74 (Series: 1–0)	Emlak Konut	Ataköy, Istanbul, Turkey
19:00 TRT (UTC+3)	Scoring by quarter: 22–21, 28–19, 18–15, 14–19
	Pts: Kuier 17; Rebs: Williams 9 Asts: Erdoğan 11; PIR: Kuier 22	Boxscore; Report	Pts: Thomas 15; Rebs: Macaulay Ndour-Fall 7 Asts: Thomas 7 PIR: Thomas 18	Arena: Sinan Erdem Dome; Attendance: 553; Referees: Yiğit Gönültaş, İsmail Binbir, Burak Erkan

26 March 2026 2	Emlak Konut	76–85 (Series: 0–2)	Galatasaray Çağdaş Faktoring	Başakşehir, Istanbul, Turkey
17:00 TRT (UTC+3)	Scoring by quarter: 15–21, 10–26, 16–16, 35–22
	Pts: Thomas 38; Rebs: Ndour-Fall 11; Asts: Thomas 4 PIR: Thomas 24	Boxscore; Report	Pts: Kuier 17; Rebs: Bayram 8 Asts: Fitik 5 PIR: Kuier 19	Arena: Başakşehir Spor Kompleksi; Attendance: 180; Referees: Berk Kurtulmuş, Abdullah Koputan, Furkan Keseratar

==== Finals ====
29 March 2026 1	Fenerbahçe Opet	85–70 (Series: 1–0)	Galatasaray Çağdaş Faktoring	Ataşehir, Istanbul, Turkey
16:00 TRT (UTC+3)	Scoring by quarter: 18–17, 21–14, 32–17, 14–22
	Pts: Rupert 19; Rebs: Meesseman 8 Asts: Meesseman 6 PIR: Uzun, Rupert 23	Boxscore; Report	Pts: Johannès 22; Rebs: Kuier 6 Asts: Fitik, Erdoğan 4 PIR: Johannès 16	Arena: Metro Enerji Sports Hall; Attendance: 871; Referees: İbrahim Altıntaş, Ahmet Taner İbin, Ahmet Kemal Digilli

1 April 2026 2	Fenerbahçe Opet	77–75 (Series: 2–0)	Galatasaray Çağdaş Faktoring	Ataşehir, Istanbul, Turkey
19:30 TRT (UTC+3)	Scoring by quarter: 29–17, 14–19, 20–19, 14–20
	Pts: Meesseman 20; Rebs: Meesseman 12; Asts: Allemand 8 PIR: Meesseman 33	Boxscore; Report	Pts: Kuier 18; Rebs: Kuier 5 Asts: Erdoğan 6 PIR: Kuier 24	Arena: Metro Enerji Sports Hall; Attendance: 781; Referees: Aydın Karaçam, Fatih Güler, Samet Biner

4 April 2026 3	Galatasaray Çağdaş Faktoring	76–87 (Series: 0–3)	Fenerbahçe Opet	Ataköy, Istanbul, Turkey
16:00 TRT (UTC+3)	Scoring by quarter: 17–22, 23–23, 13–24, 23–18
	Pts: Johannès 17; Rebs: Juhász 8 Asts: Erdoğan, Johannès 4 PIR: Kuier 19	Boxscore; Report	Pts: Rupert 24; Rebs: Rupert 10; Asts: Allemand 13; PIR: Rupert 29	Arena: Sinan Erdem Dome; Attendance: 1,470; Referees: Orkun Yurttaş, Ozan Gönen, Berk Kurtulmuş

=== EuroLeague Women ===
==== Qualification round ====
Win Loss

17 September 2025 1	ACS Sepsi SIC (Romania)	48–81	(Turkey) Galatasaray Çağdaş Faktoring	Sfântu Gheorghe, Romania
19:00 TRT (UTC+3)	Scoring by quarter: 11–26, 11–16, 13–18, 13–21
Youtube / FIBA TV	Pts: Meresz 13; Rebs: Meresz 7 Asts: Davis 7 PIR: Meresz 19	Boxscore; Report	Pts: Juhász 15; Rebs: Juhász, Kuier 10; Asts: Smalls, Juhász 6 PIR: Juhász 29	Arena: Szabó Kati Sports Hall; Attendance: 1,000; Referees: Branimir Galić (CRO), Nataša Dragojević (MNE), Ioannis Agrafiotis (GRE)

24 September 2025 2	Galatasaray Çağdaş Faktoring (Turkey)	86–46 (167–94 agg.)	(Romania) ACS Sepsi SIC	Zeytinburnu, Istanbul
20:00 TRT (UTC+3)	Scoring by quarter: 19–10, 28–8, 18–11, 21–17
Youtube / FIBA TV	Pts: Kuier 19; Rebs: Juhász 12; Asts: Oblak 7 PIR: Kuier 23	Boxscore; Report	Pts: Gereben 12; Rebs: Gereben 5 Asts: Szabo, Diop 3 PIR: Szabo 13	Arena: Basketball Development Center; Attendance: 600; Referees: Veronika Obertova (SVK), Jelena Tomic (CRO), Hrvoje Cavar (BIH)

==== First round ====
===== Group B =====
Pos	Team	Pld	W	L	PF	PA	PD	Pts	Qualification
1	(Turkish Basketball Federation) Galatasaray Cagdas Faktoring	6	6	0	471	378	+93	12	Second round
2	(Italian Basketball Federation) Beretta Famila Schio	6	4	2	452	415	+37	10	Second round
3	(French Federation of Basketball) Flammes Carolo Basket	6	2	4	419	410	+9	8	Second round
4	(Hungarian Basketball Federation) Sopron Basket	6	0	6	368	507	−139	6	EuroCup Women

Source: EuroLeague Women
Rules for classification: 1) Points; 2) Points difference; 3) Points scored.

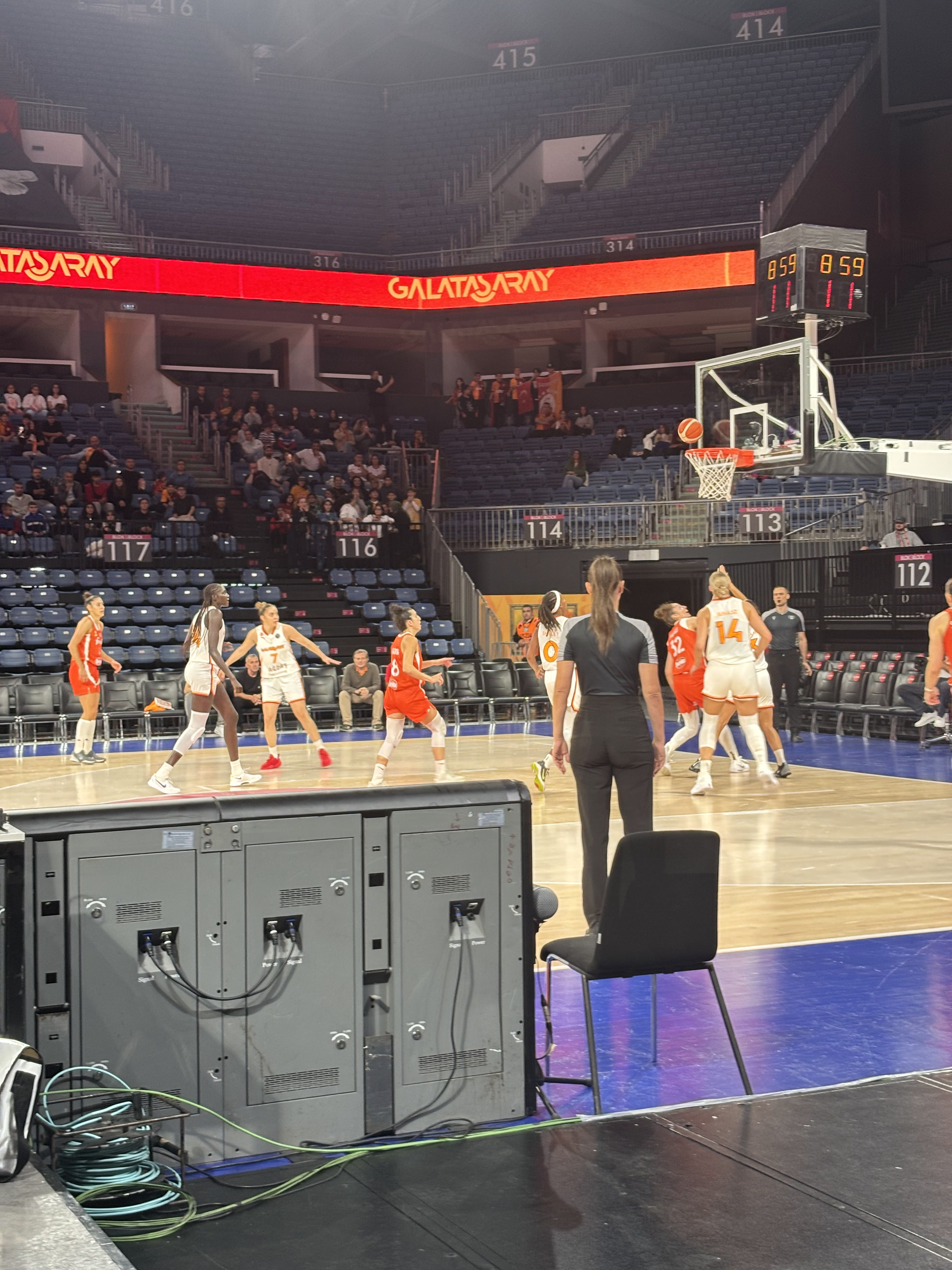
Galatasaray Çağdaş Faktoring - Beretta Famila Schio - 9 October 2025 - EuroLeague Women - Sinan Erdem Dome

==== Results summary ====
Overall						Home					Away				
Pld	W	L	PF	PA	PD	W	L	PF	PA	PD	W	L	PF	PA	PD
6	6	0	471	378	+93	3	0	254	197	+57	3	0	217	181	+36

Last updated: 26 November 2025.
Source: EuroLeague Women

==== Results by round ====
Round	1	2	3	4	5	6
Ground	H	A	A	A	H	H
Result	W	W	W	W	W	W
Position	2	1	1	1	1	1

Updated to match(es) played on 26 November 2025. Source: EuroLeague Women
A = Away; H = Home; W = Win; L = Loss

==== Matches ====
9 October 2025 1	Galatasaray Çağdaş Faktoring (Turkey)	73–70	(Italy) Beretta Famila Schio	Ataköy, Istanbul, Turkey
20:00 TRT (UTC+3)	Scoring by quarter: 17–20, 15–19, 21–16, 20–15
Youtube / FIBA TV	Pts: Smalls 14; Rebs: Juhász 8 Asts: Oblak 5 PIR: Smalls 18	Boxscore; Report	Pts: Conde 17; Rebs: Shepard 7 Asts: Conde 4 PIR: Conde 21	Arena: Sinan Erdem Dome; Attendance: 1,500; Referees: Esperanza Mendoza (ESP), Nataša Dragojević (MNE), Tomasz Wit Langowski (POL)

15 October 2025 2	Flammes Carolo Basket (France)	56–62	(Turkey) Galatasaray Çağdaş Faktoring	Charleville-Mézières, France
20:00 TRT (UTC+3)	Scoring by quarter: 18–21, 13–8, 13–15, 12–18
Youtube / FIBA TV	Pts: Franchelin 12; Rebs: Brochant, Dixon 7 Asts: Franchelin 5 PIR: Franchelin 15	Boxscore; Report	Pts: Oblak 12; Rebs: Williams 8 Asts: Oblak 4 PIR: Williams 17	Arena: Caisse d' Epargne Arena; Attendance: 2,800; Referees: Veronika Obertova (SVK), Iain Macdonald (GBR), Ewa Matuszewska (POL)

22 October 2025 3	Sopron Basket (Hungary)	64–83	(Turkey) Galatasaray Çağdaş Faktoring	Sopron, Hungary
19:00 TRT (UTC+3)	Scoring by quarter: 13–18, 18–17, 18–30, 15–18
Youtube / FIBA TV	Pts: Papp, Brooks 12; Rebs: Papp 6 Asts: Papp 5 PIR: Papp 17	Boxscore; Report	Pts: Juhász 21; Rebs: Juhász 10; Asts: Smalls 10; PIR: Juhász 28	Arena: Aréna Sopron; Attendance: 900; Referees: Nataša Dragojević (MNE), Nermin Hodzic (GER), Esperanza Mendoza (ESP)

29 October 2025 4	Beretta Famila Schio (Italy)	61–72	(Turkey) Galatasaray Çağdaş Faktoring	Schio, Italy
22:00 TRT (UTC+3)	Scoring by quarter: 13–17, 11–13, 17–15, 20–27
Youtube / FIBA TV	Pts: Conde 12; Rebs: Shepard 8 Asts: Conde 6 PIR: Shepard 14	Boxscore; Report	Pts: Smalls, Kuier 17; Rebs: Kuier 8 Asts: Oblak 7 PIR: Kuier 24	Arena: Palazzetto Livio Romare; Attendance: 1,900; Referees: Jelena Tomic (CRO), Ivana Ivanovic (SRB), Diana Lapanovic (SLO)

4 November 2025 5	Galatasaray Çağdaş Faktoring (Turkey)	77–73	(France) Flammes Carolo Basket	Ataköy, Istanbul, Turkey
20:00 TRT (UTC+3)	Scoring by quarter: 21–15, 12–24, 22–16, 22–18
Youtube / FIBA TV	Pts: Smalls 15; Rebs: Juhász, Kuier 8 Asts: Erdoğan 24; PIR: Juhász 17	Boxscore; Report	Pts: Brochant 16; Rebs: Dixon 7 Asts: Brochant, Franchelin 6 PIR: Brochant 18	Arena: Sinan Erdem Dome; Attendance: 1,000; Referees: Sonia Teixeira (POR), Gilbert Hoxha (ALB), Veronika Vavrova (CZE)

26 November 2025 6	Galatasaray Çağdaş Faktoring (Turkey)	104–54	(Hungary) Sopron Basket	Ataköy, Istanbul, Turkey
20:00 TRT (UTC+3)	Scoring by quarter: 31–15, 27–13, 24–11, 22–15
Youtube / FIBA TV	Pts: Juhász 22; Rebs: Kuier 10; Asts: Smalls, Johannès 7 PIR: Bayram 29	Boxscore; Report	Pts: Sitku 15; Rebs: Jevtovic 6 Asts: Papp 6 PIR: Sitku 14	Arena: Sinan Erdem Dome; Attendance: 627; Referees: Esperanza Mendoza (ESP), Igor Esteve Malmierca (AND), Megaklis-Konstantinos Marinakis (GRE)

==== Second round ====
===== Group E =====
Pos	Team	Pld	W	L	PF	PA	PD	Pts	Qualification
1	(Turkish Basketball Federation) Galatasaray Cagdas Faktoring	12	10	2	901	772	+129	22	Semifinal play-in
2	(Spanish Basketball Federation) Spar Girona	12	8	4	941	819	+122	20 (Note: Spar Girona 158–138 ZVVZ USK Praha)	Semifinal play-in
3	(Czech Basketball Federation) ZVVZ USK Praha	12	8	4	934	820	+114	20	Quarterfinal play-in
4	(Italian Basketball Federation) Beretta Famila Schio	12	7	5	932	887	+45	19	Quarterfinal play-in
5	(French Federation of Basketball) Tango Bourges Basket	12	6	6	860	836	+24	18	
6	(French Federation of Basketball) Flammes Carolo Basket	12	3	9	792	912	−120	15	

Source: EuroLeague Women
Rules for classification: 1) Points; 2) Points difference; 3) Points scored.

===== Results summary =====
Overall						Home					Away				
Pld	W	L	PF	PA	PD	W	L	PF	PA	PD	W	L	PF	PA	PD
6	4	2	430	394	+36	2	1	211	190	+21	2	1	219	204	+15

Last updated: 4 February 2026.
Source: EuroLeague Women

===== Results by round =====
Round	7	8	9	10	11	12
Ground	A	H	A	H	A	H
Result	L	W	W	L	W	W
Position	2	2	1	1	1	1

First match(es) will be played on 4 February 2026. Source: EuroLeague Women
A = Away; H = Home; W = Win; L = Loss

===== Matches =====
10 December 2025 7	ZVVZ USK Praha (Czech Republic)	64–55	(Turkey) Galatasaray Çağdaş Faktoring	Prague, Czech Republic
21:00 TRT (UTC+3)	Scoring by quarter: 19–16, 18–17, 16–11, 11–11
Youtube / FIBA TV	Pts: Astier 13; Rebs: Hof 9 Asts: Cazorla, Vukosavljević 4 PIR: Salaün 14	Boxscore; Report	Pts: Erdoğan, Juhász 11; Rebs: Kuier 9 Asts: Oblak 3 PIR: three players 3	Arena: Královka Arena; Attendance: 786; Referees: Silvia Marziali (ITA), Viktor Nagy (HUN), Ewa Matuszewska (POL)

17 December 2025 8	Galatasaray Çağdaş Faktoring (Turkey)	80–62	(France) Tango Bourges Basket	Ataköy, Istanbul, Turkey
20:00 TRT (UTC+3)	Scoring by quarter: 28–12, 16–12, 17–23, 19–15
Youtube / FIBA TV	Pts: Oblak 19; Rebs: Kuier 9 Asts: Smalls, Johannès 6 PIR: Oblak 21	Boxscore; Report	Pts: Pouye 19; Rebs: Djaldi-Tabdi, Diaby 7 Asts: Diaby, Pouye 4 PIR: Pouye 20	Arena: Sinan Erdem Dome; Attendance: 695; Referees: Nataša Dragojević (MNE), Teo Miletic (CRO), Balazs Meszaros (HUN)

14 January 2026 9	Spar Girona (Spain)	68–82	(Turkey) Galatasaray Çağdaş Faktoring	Girona, Spain
21:00 TRT (UTC+3)	Scoring by quarter: 23–21, 17–14, 15–29, 13–18
Youtube / FIBA TV	Pts: Bibby 21; Rebs: Pendande 11; Asts: Holm 4 PIR: Bibby 18	Boxscore; Report	Pts: Juhász 11; Rebs: Juhász 9 Asts: Oblak 6 PIR: Juhász 29	Arena: Pavelló Girona-Fontajau; Attendance: 2,518; Referees: Paulina Karolina Gajdosz (POL), Jelena Tomic (CRO), Sonia Teixeira (POR)

22 January 2026 10	Galatasaray Çağdaş Faktoring (Turkey)	64–71	(Czech Republic) ZVVZ USK Praha	Ataköy, Istanbul, Turkey
20:00 TRT (UTC+3)	Scoring by quarter: 11–23, 20–25, 14–15, 19–8
Youtube / FIBA TV	Pts: Johannès 18; Rebs: Juhász, Kuier 6 Asts: Oblak, Erdoğan 4 PIR: Johannès 17	Boxscore; Report	Pts: Salaün, Astier 16; Rebs: Vukosavljević 8 Asts: Cazorla 7 PIR: Salaün 16	Arena: Sinan Erdem Dome; Attendance: 881; Referees: Stylianos Simeonidis (GRE), Vlad-Theodor Cotrobas-Dascalu (ROU), Sava Cetkovic (MNE)

29 January 2026 11	Tango Bourges Basket (France)	72–82	(Turkey) Galatasaray Çağdaş Faktoring	Bourges, France
22:00 TRT (UTC+3)	Scoring by quarter: 16–22, 12–26, 25–19, 19–15
Youtube / FIBA TV	Pts: Diaby, Pouye 15; Rebs: Diaby 11; Asts: Makani, Naigre 3 PIR: Diaby 22	Boxscore; Report	Pts: Johannès 22; Rebs: Kuier 8 Asts: Smalls 4 PIR: Kuier 28	Arena: Caisse d'Epargne Loire Centre - le Prado; Attendance: 3,362; Referees: Ivor Matejek (CZE), Zdenko Tomasovic (SVK), Viktor Nagy (HUN)

4 February 2026 12	Galatasaray Çağdaş Faktoring (Turkey)	67–57	(Spain) Spar Girona	Ataköy, Istanbul, Turkey
20:00 TRT (UTC+3)	Scoring by quarter: 16–10, 24–13, 20–13, 7–21
Youtube / FIBA TV	Pts: Juhász, Kuier 16; Rebs: Juhász 12; Asts: Oblak 7 PIR: Juhász, Kuier 26	Boxscore; Report	Pts: Jocytė, Bibby 10; Rebs: Holm 7 Asts: Jocytė 6 PIR: Jocytė 13	Arena: Sinan Erdem Dome; Attendance: 200; Referees: Nemanja Ninkovic (SRB), Jelena Tomic (CRO), Rainis Värv (EST)

==== Play-in ====
===== Semifinal =====
19 February 2026 1	Galatasaray Çağdaş Faktoring (Turkey)	81–72(OT) (Series: 1–0)	(France) Basket Landes	Ataköy, Istanbul, Turkey
20:30 TRT (UTC+3)	Scoring by quarter: 14–11, 19–16, 20–7, 13–32, Overtime: 15–6
Youtube / FIBA TV	Pts: Juhász 21; Rebs: Kuier 11; Asts: Johannès 5 PIR: Juhász 25	Boxscore; Report	Pts: Musa, Lacan 21; Rebs: Musa 11; Asts: Pardon, Droguet 4 PIR: Musa, Lacan 23	Arena: Sinan Erdem Dome; Attendance: 1,000; Referees: Peter Praksch (HUN), Nataša Dragojević (MNE), Nemanja Vlahovic (SRB)

25 February 2026 2	Basket Landes (France)	75–70 (Series: 1–1)	(Turkey) Galatasaray Çağdaş Faktoring	Mont-de-Marsan, France
21:30 TRT (UTC+3)	Scoring by quarter: 22–23, 21–10, 23–16, 9–21
Youtube / FIBA TV	Pts: Musa 20; Rebs: Musa 9 Asts: Pardon, Lacan 5 PIR: Musa 30	Boxscore; Report	Pts: Juhász 19; Rebs: Kuier 12; Asts: Oblak 6 PIR: Kuier 20	Arena: Espace François Mitterrand; Attendance: 2,600; Referees: Jelena Tomic (CRO), Ivana Ivanovic (SRB), Hrvoje Cavar (BIH)

3 March 2026 3	Galatasaray Çağdaş Faktoring (Turkey)	67–51 (Series: 2–1)	(France) Basket Landes	Ataköy, Istanbul, Turkey
20:30 TRT (UTC+3)	Scoring by quarter: 18–13, 20–14, 16–8, 13–16
Youtube / FIBA TV	Pts: Kuier 17; Rebs: Smalls 11; Asts: Smalls 5 PIR: Kuier 20	Boxscore; Report	Pts: Musa 15; Rebs: Musa 8 Asts: Pardon 5 PIR: Musa 12	Arena: Sinan Erdem Dome; Attendance: 1,104; Referees: Viola Gyorgyi (NOR), Veronika Obertova (SVK), Alin Faur (ROU)

==== Final Six ====
===== Semifinal =====
17 April 2026	Galatasaray Çağdaş Faktoring (Turkey)	63–56	(Spain) Casademont Zaragoza	Zaragoza, Spain
21:30 TRT (UTC+3)	Scoring by quarter: 24–4, 13–16, 12–14, 14–22
Youtube / FIBA TV	Pts: Johannès 16; Rebs: Kuier 11; Asts: Erdoğan 5 PIR: Williams 20	Boxscore; Report	Pts: Hempe 18; Rebs: Hempe 8 Asts: three players 4 PIR: Hempe 17	Arena: Pabellón Príncipe Felipe; Attendance: 10,828; Referees: Petar Pesic (SRB), Nataša Dragojević (MNE), Juozas Barkauskas (LTU)

===== Final =====
19 April 2026	Galatasaray Çağdaş Faktoring (Turkey)	55–68	(Turkey) Fenerbahçe Opet	Zaragoza, Spain
21:00 TRT (UTC+3)	Scoring by quarter: 16–17, 16–20, 13–14, 10–17
Youtube / FIBA TV	Pts: Williams 15; Rebs: Smalls 9 Asts: Kuier 7 PIR: Williams 20	Boxscore; Report	Pts: Meesseman 20; Rebs: Williams, Allemand 8 Asts: Allemand 10; PIR: Allemand 28	Arena: Pabellón Príncipe Felipe; Attendance: 8,737; Referees: Sonia Teixeira (POR), Petar Pesic (SRB), Juozas Barkauskas (LTU)

=== Turkish Women's Basketball Cup ===
Win Loss

7 January 2026 QF	Beşiktaş Boa	68–77	Galatasaray Çağdaş Faktoring	Beşiktaş, Istanbul, Turkey
20:00 TRT (UTC+3)	Scoring by quarter: 20–17, 21–20, 13–15, 14–25
	Pts: Fasoula 20; Rebs: Fraser 7 Asts: Bilgiç, Whitcomb 5 PIR: Fraser 19	Boxscore; Report	Pts: Cora 18; Rebs: Juhász 7 Asts: Smalls 5 PIR: Williams 23	Arena: BJK Akatlar Arena; Attendance: 171; Referees: Orkun Yurttaş, Ahmet Murat Arıkanlı, Burak Erkan

9 January 2026 SF	Galatasaray Çağdaş Faktoring	66–64	Emlak Konut	Pamukkale, Denizli, Turkey
20:30 TRT (UTC+3)	Scoring by quarter: 20–19, 17–17, 10–9, 19–19
	Pts: Williams 24; Rebs: Williams 17; Asts: Fitik 4 PIR: Williams 36	Boxscore; Report	Pts: Thomas 19; Rebs: Macaulay 9 Asts: Sertoğlu 3 PIR: Macaulay, Sertoğlu 16	Arena: Pamukkale University Arena; Attendance: 1,000; Referees: Berk Kurtulmuş, Samet Biner, Furkan Keseratar

11 January 2026 F	Fenerbahçe Opet	86–66	Galatasaray Çağdaş Faktoring	Pamukkale, Denizli, Turkey
16:00 TRT (UTC+3)	Scoring by quarter: 21–16, 26–19, 16–20, 23–11
	Pts: Meesseman 17; Rebs: Meesseman 9 Asts: Uzun 8 PIR: Meesseman 27	Boxscore; Report	Pts: Williams 15; Rebs: Bayram 7 Asts: Smalls, Fitik 5 PIR: Williams 17	Arena: Pamukkale University Arena; Attendance: 3,000; Referees: Berk Kurtulmuş, Samet Biner, Furkan Keseratar

== Statistics ==
=== Head coaches records ===
Head Coach	Competition	G	W	D	L	PF	PA	PD	Win %
Ekrem Memnun	Women's Basketball Super League	6	5	0	1	460	408	+52	.833
Ekrem Memnun	EuroLeague Women	7	7	0	0	534	418	+116	1.000
Ekrem Memnun	Total	13	12	0	1	994	826	+168	.923
Hasan Fırat Okul	Women's Basketball Super League	14	12	0	2	1022	775	+247	.857
Hasan Fırat Okul	Women's Basketball Super League Playoffs	7	4	0	3	568	535	+33	.571
Hasan Fırat Okul	EuroLeague Women	12	8	0	4	870	770	+100	.667
Hasan Fırat Okul	Turkish Women's Basketball Cup	3	2	0	1	209	218	−9	.667
Hasan Fırat Okul	Total	36	26	0	10	2669	2298	+371	.722

Updated: April 20, 2026

== See also ==
- Commons:Category:2025–26 Galatasaray SK (women's basketball) season
