= 2026–27 Galatasaray S.K. (women's basketball) season =

Women's basketball season

Galatasaray Çağdaş Faktoring
2026–27 season
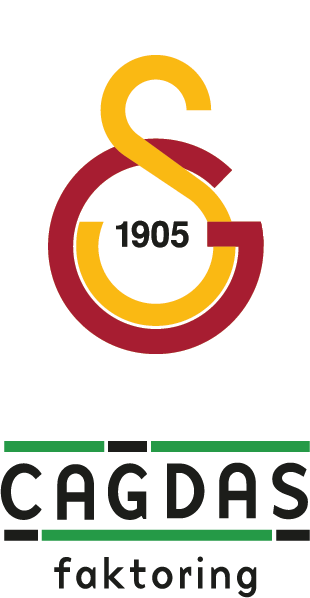
- President: Dursun Özbek
- Head coach: Frédéric Dusart
- Arena: Sinan Erdem Dome
- Women's Basketball Super League: Regular season
- EuroLeague Women: Regular season
- Turkish Women's Basketball Presidential Cup: Preseason
- Turkish Women's Basketball Cup: Preseason

Galatasaray women basketball squad in October 2026 against Nesibe Aydın

The 2026–27 season is Galatasaray's 72st season in the existence of the club. The team plays in the Women's Basketball Super League and in the EuroLeague Women.

== Season overview ==
=== Pre-season ===
On 5 August, Turkish Women's Basketball Super League 2026–27 Season fixtures have been announced.

On 18 August, Galatasaray Women's Basketball Team's new head coach is Frédéric Dusart.

On 21 August, Frédéric Sénécaut has become the new assistant coach of the Galatasaray Women's Basketball Team.

On 21 August, Tuğçe Canbaz, one of the club's former captains, has become the new assistant coach of the Galatasaray Women's Basketball Team.

On 25 August, It was announced that Gökşen Fitik will be the team captain for the 2026–27 season.

== Players ==
=== Current roster ===
Galatasaray roster
Players
Coaches

Pos.	No.	Nat.	Name	Ht.	Wt.	Age
PF	1	(United States)	Howard, Natasha	1.88 m (6 ft 2 in)	78 kg (172 lb)	35 – 2 September 1991
SF	2	(Turkey)	Akalan, Feride	1.85 m (6 ft 1 in)		25 – 14 October 2001
SG	3	(United States) (Bosnia and Herzegovina)	Smalls, Kamiah (DC)	1.78 m (5 ft 10 in)		28 – 17 April 1998
PG	4	(France)	Fauthoux, Marine	1.76 m (5 ft 9 in)		25 – 23 January 2001
PG	5	(United States)	Miles, Olivia	1.78 m (5 ft 10 in)	76 kg (168 lb)	23 – 29 January 2003
PG	6	(Turkey)	Fitik, Gökşen (C)	1.75 m (5 ft 9 in)		25 – 11 August 2001
SF	7	(Turkey)	Sezgin, Aybüke	1.75 m (5 ft 9 in)		19 – 26 June 2007
SF	8	(Turkey)	Yılmaz, Sude	1.82 m (6 ft 0 in)		24 – 15 March 2002
SG	10	(Turkey)	Uzun, Sevgi	1.78 m (5 ft 10 in)	64 kg (141 lb)	28 – 25 November 1997
PG	11	(Turkey)	Erdoğan, Derin	1.68 m (5 ft 6 in)		24 – 28 June 2002
F	13	(France)	Salaün, Janelle	1.88 m (6 ft 2 in)		25 – 5 September 2001
F	14	(Hungary)	Juhász, Dorka	1.96 m (6 ft 5 in)	91 kg (201 lb)	26 – 18 December 1999
G	16	(Turkey)	Bay, Gamze			19 – 26 April 2007
F	17	(Turkey)	Bayram, Elif	1.87 m (6 ft 2 in)		25 – 18 September 2001
SF	18	(Turkey)	Düzcü, Yaren	1.80 m (5 ft 11 in)		19 – 4 March 2007
C	21	(Netherlands)	Hof, Emese	1.91 m (6 ft 3 in)		30 – 29 May 1996
PF	34	(Finland)	Kuier, Awak	1.95 m (6 ft 5 in)		25 – 19 August 2001
PG	54	(Turkey)	Durmuşoğlu, Edanur	1.60 m (5 ft 3 in)		19 – 14 March 2007
SG	77	(United Kingdom)	Winterburn, Holly	1.80 m (5 ft 11 in)		26 – 1 October 2000

Head coach

- (France) Frédéric Dusart

Assistant coach(es)

- (France) Frédéric Sénécaut
- (Turkey) Tuğçe Canbaz
- (Turkey) Batukaan Akkaya

Athletic trainer(s)

- (Turkey) Semih Eroğlu
- (Turkey) Serkan Bodur

Physiotherapist(s)

- (Turkey) Mümin Balcıoğulları
- (Turkey) Sıla Nur Bilgin

Team manager

- (Turkey) Elif Magul

Legend

- (C) Team captain
- (DC) Dual citizenship
- Injured

- Roster
Updated: 20 November 2026

Last updated: 20 November 2026.
Source: Turkish Basketball Federation, FIBA Basketball

=== Depth chart ===
Pos.	Starting 5	Bench 1	Bench 2	Bench 3	Inactive
C	Awak Kuier	Emese Hof
PF	Natasha Howard	Dorka Juhász	Elif Bayram
SF	Janelle Salaün	Feride Akalan	Sude Yılmaz	Yaren Düzcü	Aybüke Sezgin
SG	Sevgi Uzun	Holly Winterburn	Kamiah Smalls		Gamze Bay
PG	Marine Fauthoux	Gökşen Fitik	Derin Erdoğan	Edanur Durmuşoğlu	Olivia Miles

(colours: Turkish or homegrown players; foreign players)

=== Transactions ===
==== Players In ====
No.	Pos.	Nat.	Name	Age	Moving from		Type	Contract	Ends	Transfer fee	Date	Source
10	SG	(Turkey)	Sevgi Uzun	28	Fenerbahçe Opet	(Turkey)	2 years	June 2028	Free	18 July 2026		
13	F	(France)	Janelle Salaün	24	Golden State Valkyries	(United States)	2 years	June 2028	Free	22 July 2026		
2	F	(Turkey)	Feride Akalan	24	ÇBK Mersin	(Turkey)	1 years	June 2027	Free	24 July 2026		
12	G	(United States)	Sydney Taylor	25	Chicago Sky	(United States)	1 years	June 2027	Free	25 July 2026		
21	C	(Netherlands)	Emese Hof	30	Minnesota Lynx	(United States)	1 years	June 2027	Free	27 July 2026		
4	PG	(France)	Marine Fauthoux	25	New York Liberty	(United States)	1 years	June 2027	Free	28 July 2026		
1	PF	(United States)	Natasha Howard	34	Minnesota Lynx	(United States)	1 years	June 2027	Free	29 July 2026		
9	C	(United States)	Olivia Nelson-Ododa	26	Connecticut Sun	(United States)	Short-term	November 2026	Free	19 September 2026		
77	SG	(United Kingdom)	Holly Winterburn	26	Portland Fire	(United States)	1 years	June 2027	Free	17 November 2026		
5	PG	(United States)	Olivia Miles	23	Hive BC	(United States)	Short-term	June 2027	Free	20 November 2026		

==== Players Out ====
No.	Pos.	Nat.	Name	Age	Moving to		Type	Transfer fee	Date	Source
7	SF	(Turkey)	Sehernaz Çidal	31	Free agent		End of contract	Free	5 June 2026	
8	SG	(Turkey)	Ayşe Cora	33	Free agent		End of contract	Free	5 June 2026	
12	PF	(Turkey)	Zeynep Şevval Gül	25	Fenerbahçe Opet	(Turkey)	End of contract	Free	5 June 2026	
21	PG	(Turkey)	Berna Şahin	23	Free agent		End of contract	Free	5 June 2026	
0	PG	(United States) (Bosnia and Herzegovina)	Kamiah Smalls	28	Portland Fire	(United States)	End of contract	Free	28 June 2026	
1	C	(United States) (Nigeria)	Elizabeth Williams	33	Chicago Sky	(United States)	End of contract	Free	28 June 2026	
3	PG	(Slovenia)	Teja Oblak	35	Portland Fire	(United States)	End of contract	Free	28 June 2026	
23	G	(France)	Marine Johannès	31	New York Liberty	(United States)	End of contract	Free	28 June 2026	
12	G	(United States)	Sydney Taylor	25	New York Liberty	(United States)	Contract termination	Free	30 September 2026	
9	C	(United States)	Olivia Nelson-Ododa	26			End of contract	Free	7 November 2026	

==== Contract extension ====
No.	Pos.	Nat.	Name	Age	Cont.	Date	Source
34	PF	(Finland)	Awak Kuier	24	1 year	7 July 2026	
6	PG	(Turkey)	Gökşen Fitik	24	2 year	9 July 2026	
11	PG	(Turkey)	Derin Erdoğan	24	2 year	11 July 2026	
14	F	(Hungary)	Dorka Juhász	26	1 year	13 July 2026	
8	SF	(Turkey)	Sude Yılmaz	24	2 year	14 July 2026	
17	F	(Turkey)	Elif Bayram	24	1 year	18 July 2026	
3	SG	(United States) (Bosnia and Herzegovina)	Kamiah Smalls	28	1 year	20 September 2026	

== Club ==
=== Technical Staff ===
As of 16 October 2026

Staff member	Position
Işıl Alben	General Coordinator
Melahat Aydın	Administrative Manager
Elif Magul	Team Manager
Frédéric Dusart	Head Coach
Frédéric Sénécaut	Assistant Coach
Tuğçe Canbaz	Assistant Coach
Batukaan Akkaya	Assistant Coach
Semih Eroğlu	Conditioner
Serkan Bodur	Conditioner
Tolgahan Korkmaz	Doctor
Mümin Balcıoğulları	Physiotherapist
Sıla Nur Bilgin	Physiotherapist
İbrahim Kalkan	Media and Communications Officer
Zerrin Hatacıkoğlu	Masseuse
Osman Aşbay	Masseur
Alaaddin Akkoyun	Equipment Manager
Özcan Kör	Operation

=== Uniform ===
Home	Away	Third

=== Sponsorship and kit manufacturers ===
- Supplier: Puma
- Name sponsor: Çağdaş Faktoring
- Main sponsor: Çağdaş Faktoring
- Back sponsor: Madeş Mobilya
- Sleeve sponsor: —
- Lateral sponsor: —
- Short sponsor: —
- Socks sponsor: —

== Pre-season and friendlies ==
Friendly	vs.

== Competitions ==
=== Overall ===
Competition	Started round	Final position / round	First match	Last match
Women's Basketball Super League	Round 1		4 October 2026	
EuroLeague Women	Round 1		15 October 2026	
Turkish Women's Basketball Presidential Cup	—		December 2026	
Turkish Women's Basketball Cup	—		2027	

Updated to match played 20 September 2026
Source: Competitions

=== Overview ===
Competition	Record							
Competition	Pld	W	D	L	PF	PA	PD	Win %
Women's Basketball Super League	7	7	0	0	589	450	+139	100.00
EuroLeague Women	4	2	0	2	279	263	+16	50.00
Turkish Women's Basketball Presidential Cup	0	0	0	0	0	0	+0	—
Turkish Women's Basketball Cup	0	0	0	0	0	0	+0	—
Total	11	9	0	2	868	713	+155	81.82

Last updated: 21 November 2026
Source: Competitions

=== Women's Basketball Super League ===
==== Regular season ====
Pos	Team	Pld	W	L	PF	PA	PD	Pts	Qualification
1	Galatasaray Çağdaş Faktoring	6	6	0	487	409	+78	12	Advance to playoffs
2	Botaş	7	5	2	515	474	+41	12	Advance to playoffs
3	Nesibe Aydın	7	5	2	526	511	+15	12	Advance to playoffs
4	Fenerbahçe Tarfin	6	5	1	515	415	+100	11	Advance to playoffs
5	Beşiktaş Boa	6	4	2	436	376	+60	10	Advance to playoffs
6	Çimsa ÇBK Mersin	6	3	3	437	421	+16	9	Advance to playoffs
7	Ormanspor	7	2	5	492	543	−51	9	Advance to playoffs
8	Melikgazi Basketbol	7	2	5	448	499	−51	9	Advance to playoffs
9	Emlak Konut	6	2	4	431	441	−10	8	
10	İstanbul Gençlik SK	6	1	5	400	453	−53	7	
11	Turgutlu Belediyespor	6	0	6	348	493	−145	6	Relegation to TKBL

Updated to match(es) played on 7 November 2026. Source: KBSL
Rules for classification: 1) Points; 2) Points difference; 3) Points scored.

==== Results summary ====
Overall						Home					Away				
Pld	W	L	PF	PA	PD	W	L	PF	PA	PD	W	L	PF	PA	PD
7	7	0	589	450	+139	3	0	245	194	+51	4	0	344	256	+88

Last updated: 21 November 2026.
Source: TBF.org.tr

==== Results by round ====
Round	1	2	3	4	5	6	7	8	9	10	11	12	13	14	15	16	17	18	19	20	21	22
Ground	B	A	H	A	H	A	H	A	H	A	H	B	H	A	H	A	H	A	H	A	H	A
Result	B	W	W	W	W	W	W	W														
Position	11	8	5	5	3	2	1	1														

Updated to match(es) played on 22 November 2026. Source: TBF.org.tr
A = Away; H = Home; B = Bye; W = Win; L = Loss; C = Canceled

==== Matches ====
1	Bye

4 October 2026 2	İstanbul Gençlik Spor	83–84(OT)	Galatasaray Çağdaş Faktoring	Başakşehir, Istanbul, Turkey
14:00 TRT (UTC+3)	Scoring by quarter: 21–20, 21–26, 18–12, 17–19, Overtime: 6–7
	Pts: Stanković 23; Rebs: Tonguç, Collier 8 Asts: Guirantes 9 PIR: Tonguç 27	Boxscore; Report	Pts: Nelson-Ododa 24; Rebs: Bayram 10; Asts: Erdoğan 7 PIR: Bayram 21	Arena: Başakşehir Sports Complex; Attendance: 750; Referees: Hüseyin Çamcı, Halil Ata Günal, Efe Özalkan

11 October 2026 3	Galatasaray Çağdaş Faktoring	85–62	Çimsa ÇBK Mersin	Ataköy, Istanbul, Turkey
14:00 TRT (UTC+3)	Scoring by quarter: 21–27, 15–17, 28–14, 21–4
	Pts: Kuier 19; Rebs: Kuier 9 Asts: Uzun 10; PIR: Kuier 28	Boxscore; Report	Pts: Burke 24; Rebs: Ataş 10; Asts: Ataş 5 PIR: Burke 19	Arena: Sinan Erdem Dome; Attendance: 1,200; Referees: Barış Turgut, Erdoğan Çelebi, Sait Nedim Çelik

18 October 2026 4	Emlak Konut	67–73	Galatasaray Çağdaş Faktoring	Başakşehir, Istanbul, Turkey
14:00 TRT (UTC+3)	Scoring by quarter: 24–18, 15–14, 13–22, 15–19
	Pts: Mavunga 20; Rebs: Allen 10; Asts: Allen 5 PIR: Mavunga 18	Boxscore; Report	Pts: Uzun, Kuier 17; Rebs: Nelson-Ododa 9 Asts: Erdoğan, Kuier 7 PIR: Kuier 22	Arena: Başakşehir Sports Complex; Attendance: 600; Referees: Furkan Keseratar, Metehan Alaçam, Yavuzhan Kürşat Aydın

25 October 2026 5	Galatasaray Çağdaş Faktoring	77–71	Nesibe Aydın	Ataköy, Istanbul, Turkey
14:00 TRT (UTC+3)	Scoring by quarter: 26–19, 17–22, 21–12, 13–18
	Pts: Erdoğan 20; Rebs: Smalls, Nelson-Ododa 6 Asts: Uzun 7 PIR: Erdoğan 18	Boxscore; Report	Pts: four players 12; Rebs: Harmon 11; Asts: Harmon, Ivanova 4 PIR: Harmon, Beers 18	Arena: Sinan Erdem Dome; Attendance: 400; Referees: Münevver Özemre, Kamil Alok, Şükriye Nur Kızıl

1 November 2026 6	Melikgazi Kayseri Basketbol	65–85	Galatasaray Çağdaş Faktoring	Kocasinan, Kayseri, Turkey
16:00 TRT (UTC+3)	Scoring by quarter: 21–20, 11–20, 13–23, 20–22
	Pts: Jones 23; Rebs: Mompremier 11; Asts: Fair 4 PIR: Fair 21	Boxscore; Report	Pts: Fauthoux, Juhász 16; Rebs: Juhász, Bayram 5 Asts: Uzun 5 PIR: Uzun 19	Arena: Kadir Has Spor Salonu; Attendance: 4,500; Referees: Ozan Gönen, Hakan Gerey, Furkan Köse

7 November 2026 7	Galatasaray Çağdaş Faktoring	83–61	Beşiktaş BOA	Ataköy, Istanbul, Turkey
14:00 TRT (UTC+3)	Scoring by quarter: 25–12, 19–23, 20–17, 19–9
	Pts: Uzun 22; Rebs: Juhász 12; Asts: Erdoğan 6 PIR: Kuier 22	Boxscore; Report	Pts: Davis 17; Rebs: Yıldızhan, Badiane 6 Asts: Günay 8 PIR: Davis 20	Arena: Sinan Erdem Dome; Attendance: 800; Referees: Burak Pehlivan, Nagehan Şeyda Kurden Aktaş, Oğuzhan Güzel

21 November 2026 8	Turgutlu Belediyespor	41–102	Galatasaray Çağdaş Faktoring	Turgutlu, Manisa, Turkey
18:00 TRT (UTC+3)	Scoring by quarter: 2–31, 17–27, 5–23, 17–21
	Pts: Dabakoğlu 15; Rebs: Öztosun 6 Asts: Tongar, Zeybek 2 PIR: Dabakoğlu 10	Boxscore; Report	Pts: Salaün 18; Rebs: Bayram 12; Asts: Fitik 8 PIR: Salaün 27	Arena: Yıldırım Beyazıt Sports Hall; Attendance: 700; Referees: Yarkın Keskin, Benhür İrcel, Ada Atlayan

28 November 2026 9	Galatasaray Çağdaş Faktoring	vs.	Fenerbahçe Tarfin	Ataköy, Istanbul, Turkey
19:00 TRT (UTC+3)
		Boxscore		Arena: Sinan Erdem Dome

5 December 2026 10	Botaş	vs.	Galatasaray Çağdaş Faktoring	Altındağ, Ankara, Turkey
14:00 TRT (UTC+3)
		Boxscore		Arena: Ankara Arena

13 December 2026 11	Galatasaray Çağdaş Faktoring	vs.	OGM Ormanspor	Ataköy, Istanbul, Turkey
15:00 TRT (UTC+3)
		Boxscore		Arena: Sinan Erdem Dome

12	Bye

13	Galatasaray Çağdaş Faktoring	vs.	İstanbul Gençlik Spor	Ataköy, Istanbul, Turkey
		Boxscore		Arena: Sinan Erdem Dome

14	Çimsa ÇBK Mersin	vs.	Galatasaray Çağdaş Faktoring	Yenişehir, Mersin, Turkey
		Boxscore		Arena: Servet Tazegül Arena

15	Galatasaray Çağdaş Faktoring	vs.	Emlak Konut	Ataköy, Istanbul, Turkey
		Boxscore		Arena: Sinan Erdem Dome

16	Nesibe Aydın	vs.	Galatasaray Çağdaş Faktoring	Söğütözü, Ankara, Turkey
		Boxscore		Arena: TOBB Sport Hall

17	Galatasaray Çağdaş Faktoring	vs.	Melikgazi Kayseri Basketbol	Ataköy, Istanbul, Turkey
		Boxscore		Arena: Sinan Erdem Dome

18	Beşiktaş BOA	vs.	Galatasaray Çağdaş Faktoring	Beşiktaş, Istanbul, Turkey
		Boxscore		Arena: BJK Akatlar Arena

19	Galatasaray Çağdaş Faktoring	vs.	Turgutlu Belediyespor	Ataköy, Istanbul, Turkey
		Boxscore		Arena: Sinan Erdem Dome

20	Fenerbahçe Tarfin	vs.	Galatasaray Çağdaş Faktoring	Istanbul, Turkey
		Boxscore		Arena: Metro Enerji Sports Hall

21	Galatasaray Çağdaş Faktoring	vs.	Botaş	Ataköy, Istanbul, Turkey
		Boxscore		Arena: Sinan Erdem Dome

22	OGM Ormanspor	vs.	Galatasaray Çağdaş Faktoring	Yenimahalle, Ankara, Turkey
		Boxscore		Arena: M. Sait Zarifoğlu Spor Salonu

=== EuroLeague Women ===
==== First round ====
===== Group B =====
Pos	Team	Pld	W	L	PF	PA	PD	Pts	Qualification
1	(Italian Basketball Federation) Beretta Famila Schio (Q)	4	3	1	302	253	+49	7	Second round
2	(Basketball Federation of Serbia) KKZ Crvena zvezda (Q)	4	3	1	326	277	+49	7	Second round
3	(Turkish Basketball Federation) Galatasaray Çağdaş Faktoring	4	2	2	279	263	+16	6	Second round
4	(Basketball Belgium) Kangoeroes Basket Mechelen	4	0	4	222	336	−114	4	EuroCup Women

Updated to match(es) played on 4 November 2026. Source: EuroLeague Women
Rules for classification: 1) Points; 2) Points difference; 3) Points scored.
(Q) Qualified for the phase indicated

===== Results summary =====
Overall						Home					Away				
Pld	W	L	PF	PA	PD	W	L	PF	PA	PD	W	L	PF	PA	PD
4	2	2	279	263	+16	0	2	134	162	−28	2	0	145	101	+44

Last updated: 4 November 2026.
Source: EuroLeague Women

===== Results by round =====
Round	1	2	3	4	5	6
Ground	H	A	H	A	H	A
Result	L	W	L	W		
Position	3	3	3	3		

Updated to match(es) played on 4 November 2026. Source: EuroLeague Women
A = Away; H = Home; W = Win; L = Loss

===== Matches =====
15 October 2026 1	Galatasaray Çağdaş Faktoring (Turkey)	66–84	(Italy) Beretta Famila Schio	Ataköy, Istanbul, Turkey
20:00 TRT (UTC+3)	Scoring by quarter: 17–23, 18–20, 20–22, 11–19
Youtube / FIBA TV	Pts: Kuier 16; Rebs: Bayram 8 Asts: Kuier 7 PIR: Kuier 15	Boxscore; Report	Pts: Laksa 18; Rebs: Bertsch 6 Asts: Zanardi, Verona 7 PIR: Laksa 18	Arena: Sinan Erdem Dome; Attendance: 121; Referees: Marius Ciulin (ROU), Tomasz Wit Langowski (POL), Paulina Gajdosz (POL)

22 October 2026 2	Kangoeroes Basket Mechelen (Belgium)	50–77	(Turkey) Galatasaray Çağdaş Faktoring	Mechelen, Belgium
21:30 TRT (UTC+3)	Scoring by quarter: 18–19, 5–13, 14–20, 13–25
Youtube / FIBA TV	Pts: Sullivan 15; Rebs: Parham 10; Asts: Nauwelaers 6 PIR: Sullivan 11	Boxscore; Report	Pts: Erdoğan 11; Rebs: five players 5 Asts: four players 4 PIR: Erdoğan 16	Arena: Sport- & Recreatiedomein De Nekker; Attendance: 750; Referees: Lauri Jäämaa (FIN), Pawel Pacek (POL), Marek Kukelcik (SVK)

29 October 2026 3	Galatasaray Çağdaş Faktoring (Turkey)	68–78	(Serbia) KKZ Crvena zvezda	Ataköy, Istanbul, Turkey
20:00 TRT (UTC+3)	Scoring by quarter: 24–19, 14–19, 16–19, 14–21
Youtube / FIBA TV	Pts: Kuier 20; Rebs: Fauthoux 10; Asts: Fauthoux 6 PIR: Kuier 28	Boxscore; Report	Pts: Spanou 21; Rebs: Spanou 10; Asts: Henderson 5 PIR: Spanou 24	Arena: Sinan Erdem Dome; Attendance: 1,314; Referees: Esperanza Mendoza (ESP), Bogna Podkowinska (POL), Amalia Marchiş (ROU)

4 November 2026 4	Beretta Famila Schio (Italy)	51–68	(Turkey) Galatasaray Çağdaş Faktoring	Schio, Italy
22:00 TRT (UTC+3)	Scoring by quarter: 13–24, 9–17, 13–7, 16–20
Youtube / FIBA TV	Pts: Verona, Coulibaly 11; Rebs: Coulibaly 11; Asts: Zanardi 7 PIR: Coulibaly 20	Boxscore; Report	Pts: Smalls 17; Rebs: Juhász 11; Asts: Juhász 3 PIR: Kuier 24	Arena: Palaromare; Attendance: 2,150; Referees: Natasa Dragojevic (MNE), Veronika Obertova (SVK), Goran Grbic (SLO)

25 November 2026 5	Galatasaray Çağdaş Faktoring (Turkey)	vs.	(Belgium) Kangoeroes Basket Mechelen	Ataköy, Istanbul, Turkey
20:00 TRT (UTC+3)
Youtube / FIBA TV		Boxscore		Arena: Sinan Erdem Dome

2 December 2026 6	KKZ Crvena zvezda (Basketball Federation of Serbia)	vs.	(Turkey) Galatasaray Çağdaş Faktoring	Belgrade, Serbia
20:00 TRT (UTC+3)
Youtube / FIBA TV		Boxscore		Arena: Ranko Žeravica Sports Hall

== See also ==
- Commons:Category:2026–27 Galatasaray SK (women's basketball) season
