= 2026 Turkish Women's Basketball Cup =

- Season: 2025–26
- Duration: 6–11 January 2026
- Games played: 7
- Teams: 8
- TV partner: HT Spor

Finals
- Champions: Fenerbahçe (15th title)
- Runners-up: Galatasaray

Awards
- Final MVP: (Belgium) Emma Meesseman

The 2026 Turkish Women's Basketball Cup (Turkish: 2026 Basketbol Kadınlar Türkiye Kupası), also known as Halkbank Kadınlar Türkiye Kupası for sponsorship reasons, was the 32nd edition of Turkey's top-tier level professional women's domestic basketball cup competition. The quarterfinals of tournament were held between 6 and 7 January 2026 in 4 different locations, followed by the semi-finals and the final held from 9 to 11 January 2026 at the Pamukkale University Arena in Denizli, Turkey.

Fenerbahçe won 15 championship in their 21 final appearance, while Galatasaray played a total of 17 Turkish Cup finals and won 11 of them.

== Qualified teams ==
The top eight placed teams after the first half of the top-tier level Women's Basketball Super League 2025–26 season qualified for the tournament. The four highest-placed teams played against the lowest-seeded teams in the quarter-finals. The competition will be played under a single elimination format.

| Pos | Team | Pld | W | L | PF | PA | PD | Pts | Seeding |
|---|---|---|---|---|---|---|---|---|---|
| 1 | Fenerbahçe | 10 | 10 | 0 | 842 | 658 | +184 | 20 | Seeded |
| 2 | Galatasaray | 10 | 8 | 2 | 737 | 605 | +132 | 18 | Seeded |
| 3 | Emlak Konut SK | 10 | 8 | 2 | 737 | 644 | +93 | 18 | Seeded |
| 4 | ÇBK Mersin | 10 | 7 | 3 | 769 | 701 | +68 | 17 | Seeded |
| 5 | Nesibe Aydın | 10 | 6 | 4 | 786 | 757 | +29 | 16 | Unseeded |
| 6 | Botaş | 10 | 5 | 5 | 783 | 756 | +27 | 15 | Unseeded |
| 7 | Beşiktaş | 10 | 5 | 5 | 745 | 722 | +23 | 15 | Unseeded |
| 8 | Kayseri Basketbol | 10 | 3 | 7 | 652 | 697 | −45 | 13 | Unseeded |

Source: KBSL

== Draw ==
The 2026 Turkish Women's Basketball Cup was drawn on 23 December 2025. The seeded teams were paired in the quarterfinals with the non-seeded teams.

== Bracket ==
Quarterfinals; 6–7 January
1 | Fenerbahçe | 109
5 | Nesibe Aydın | 56
6 | Botaş | 78
4 | ÇBK Mersin | 81
7 | Beşiktaş | 68
2 | Galatasaray | 77
8 | Kayseri Basketbol | 86
3 | Emlak Konut SK | 92

Semifinals; 9 January
1 | Fenerbahçe | 84
4 | ÇBK Mersin | 66
2 | Galatasaray | 66
3 | Emlak Konut SK | 64

Final; 11 January
1 | Fenerbahçe | 86
2 | Galatasaray | 66

== Quarterfinals ==
Note: All times are TRT (UTC+3) as listed by Turkish Basketball Federation.

| 6 January 2026 QF | Botaş | 78–81 | ÇBK Mersin | Ankara |
| 17:30 | Scoring by quarter: 22–14, 15–15, 18–23, 23–29 |
| | Pts: Dantas 27; Rebs: Dantas 9 Asts: Bejedi 7 PIR: Dantas 29 | Boxscore | Pts: Vanloo 22; Rebs: Ataş, Burke 11; Asts: Vanloo 6 PIR: Burke 27 | Arena: Ankara Arena; Attendance: 100; Referees: İbrahim Altıntaş, Metehan Alaçam, Caner Bahadır |

| 6 January 2026 QF | Fenerbahçe | 109–56 | Nesibe Aydın | Istanbul |
| 20:00 | Scoring by quarter: 27–17, 24–10, 27–13, 31–16 |
| | Pts: Williams 19; Rebs: Rupert, Avcı 7 Asts: Rupert 7 PIR: Rupert 28 | Boxscore | Pts: Davis 21; Rebs: Davis 7 Asts: three players 3 PIR: Davis 29 | Arena: Metro Enerji Sports Hall; Attendance: 160; Referees: Hüseyin Çamcı, Münevver Özemre, Burak Durmuş |

| 7 January 2026 QF | Kayseri Basketbol | 86–92 | Emlak Konut SK | Kayseri |
| 17:30 | Scoring by quarter: 26–39, 25–20, 16–22, 19–11 |
| | Pts: Dangerfield, Collier 20; Rebs: Dangerfield 10; Asts: Williams 7 PIR: Williams 23 | Boxscore | Pts: Ndour 23; Rebs: Macaulay 10; Asts: Thomas 8 PIR: Ndour 24 | Arena: Kadir Has Spor Salonu; Attendance: 300; Referees: Aydın Karaçam, Nihat Çetin, Niyazi Yasin Kahraman |

| 7 January 2026 QF | Beşiktaş | 68–77 | Galatasaray | Istanbul |
| 20:00 | Scoring by quarter: 20–17, 21–20, 13–15, 14–25 |
| | Pts: Fasoula 20; Rebs: Fraser 7 Asts: Bilgiç, Whitcomb 5 PIR: Fraser 19 | Boxscore | Pts: Cora 18; Rebs: Juhász 7 Asts: Smalls 5 PIR: Williams 23 | Arena: Akatlar Arena; Attendance: 171; Referees: Orkun Yurttaş, Ahmet Murat Arıkanlı, Burkan Erkan |

== Semifinals ==
Note: All times are TRT (UTC+3) as listed by Turkish Basketball Federation.

| 9 January 2026 SF | Fenerbahçe | 84–66 | ÇBK Mersin | Denizli |
| 17:00 | Scoring by quarter: 22–13, 14–28, 25–10, 23–15 |
| | Pts: Uzun 15; Rebs: Rupert 12; Asts: Meesseman 10; PIR: Meesseman 26 | Boxscore | Pts: Burke 17; Rebs: Burke 10; Asts: Juškaitė 4 PIR: Burke 26 | Arena: Pamukkale University Arena; Attendance: 800; Referees: Turgut Işık, Mesut Öztürk, Yarkın Keskin |

| 9 January 2026 SF | Galatasaray | 66–64 | Emlak Konut SK | Denizli |
| 20:30 | Scoring by quarter: 20–19, 17–17, 10–9, 19–19 |
| | Pts: Williams 24; Rebs: Williams 17; Asts: Fitik 4 PIR: Williams 36 | Boxscore | Pts: Thomas 19; Rebs: Macaulay 9 Asts: Sertoğlu 3 PIR: Macaulay, Sertoğlu 16 | Arena: Pamukkale University Arena; Attendance: 1,000; Referees: Berk Kurtulmuş, Samet Biner, Furkan Keseratar |

== Final ==
=== Summary ===
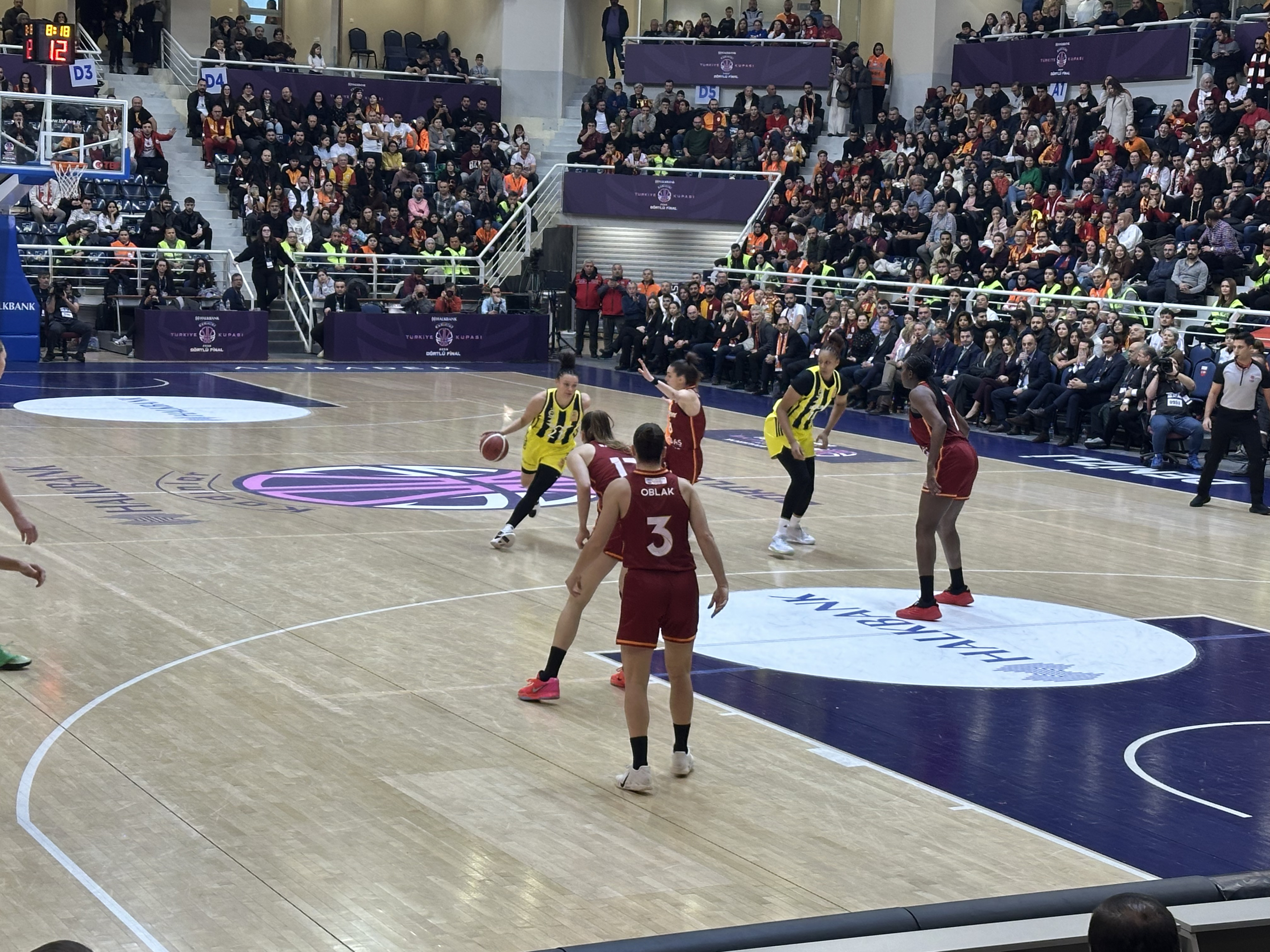
Kayla McBride dribbling the ball during a Fenerbahçe possession

Fenerbahçe Opet and Galatasaray Çağdaş Faktoring faced each other in the final of the 2026 Turkish Women's Basketball Cup at Pamukkale University Arena. The match was officiated by referees Berk Kurtulmuş, Samet Biner and Furkan Keseratar.

Fenerbahçe started the game with an aggressive defensive approach and established early control through the inside scoring of Emma Meesseman and Iliana Rupert, taking an 8–2 lead. Although Galatasaray responded through Teja Oblak and Ayşe Cora, Fenerbahçe maintained the advantage and ended the first quarter ahead 21–16. In the second quarter, Fenerbahçe increased the tempo and extended the lead to double digits, forcing Galatasaray into a timeout. Despite continued efforts by the Galatasaray backcourt, Fenerbahçe went into halftime leading 47–35.

Fenerbahçe opened the second half with a 6–0 run, preserving their control of the game and holding a 56–44 advantage midway through the third quarter. Galatasaray managed to reduce the deficit to single digits late in the quarter, but Fenerbahçe entered the final quarter with a 63–55 lead. The defending side decisively pulled away early in the fourth quarter, using fast-break opportunities and efficient scoring from Julie Allemand, Iliana Rupert and Emma Meesseman to extend the margin to as many as 19 points. Fenerbahçe maintained control in the closing minutes and secured an 86–66 victory to claim the title.

Emma Meesseman led Fenerbahçe with 17 points, 9 rebounds and 5 assists, earning the Most Valuable Player award of the final. For Galatasaray, Elizabeth Williams recorded 15 points, 5 rebounds and 1 assist. The championship trophy was presented to Fenerbahçe captain Alperi Onar and MVP Emma Meesseman by Denizli Metropolitan Municipality Mayor Bülent Nuri Çavuşoğlu and Turkish Basketball Federation officials, while Galatasaray received the runners-up award.

=== Details ===
| 11 January 2026 | Fenerbahçe | 86–66 | Galatasaray | Denizli |
| 16:00 TRT (UTC+3) | Scoring by quarter: 21–16, 26–19, 16–20, 13–11 |
| | Pts: Meesseman 17; Rebs: Meesseman 9 Asts: Uzun 8 PIR: Meesseman 27 | Boxscore | Pts: Williams 15; Rebs: Bayram 7 Asts: Smalls, Fitik 5 PIR: Williams 17 | Arena: Pamukkale University Arena; Attendance: 3,000; Referees: Berk Kurtulmuş, Samet Biner, Furkan Keseratar |

| Starters: | | | Pts | Reb | Ast |
|---|---|---|---|---|---|
| PG | 2 | (Turkey) Sevgi Uzun | 7 | 1 | 8 |
| SG | 4 | (Turkey) Olcay Çakır | 3 | 2 | 2 |
| SF | 21 | (United States) Kayla McBride | 15 | 4 | 6 |
| PF | 11 | (Belgium) Emma Meesseman | 17 | 9 | 5 |
| C | 12 | (France) Iliana Rupert | 16 | 5 | 1 |
| Reserves: | | | | | |
| F | 5 | (France) Gabby Williams | 6 | 1 | 0 |
| PG | 10 | (Turkey) Alperi Onar | 3 | 1 | 0 |
| SF | 13 | (Turkey) Tuana Vural | 0 | 0 | 0 |
| C | 14 | (Turkey) Teaira McCowan | 11 | 4 | 0 |
| PF | 15 | (Turkey) Tilbe Şenyürek | DNP | | |
| PG | 22 | (Belgium) Julie Allemand | 8 | 1 | 4 |
| PF | 33 | (Turkey) Meltem Avcı | 0 | 0 | 0 |
Head coach:
(Spanish Basketball Federation) Miguel Méndez

| Fenerbahçe | Galatasaray |

| Fenerbahçe | Statistics | Galatasaray |
|---|---|---|
| 29/44 (65.9%) | 2-pt field goals | 17/39 (43.6%) |
| 5/16 (31.3%) | 3-pt field goals | 8/20 (40%) |
| 13/18 (72.2%) | Free throws | 8/14 (57.1%) |
| 6 | Offensive rebounds | 11 |
| 24 | Defensive rebounds | 21 |
| 30 | Total rebounds | 32 |
| 26 | Assists | 18 |
| 9 | Turnovers | 16 |
| 10 | Steals | 4 |
| 2 | Blocks | 0 |
| 13 | Fouls | 18 |

2026 Turkish Women's Basketball Cup champions
Fenerbahçe Opet
(15th title)

| Starters: | | | Pts | Reb | Ast |
|---|---|---|---|---|---|
| PG | 3 | (Slovenia) Teja Oblak | 13 | 2 | 3 |
| SG | 8 | (Turkey) Ayşe Cora | 11 | 6 | 1 |
| SF | 0 | (Bosnia and Herzegovina) Kamiah Smalls | 4 | 0 | 5 |
| PF | 17 | (Turkey) Elif Bayram | 2 | 7 | 0 |
| C | 1 | (United States) Elizabeth Williams | 15 | 5 | 1 |
| Reserves: | | | | | |
| SF | 5 | (Turkey) Sude Yılmaz | 0 | 1 | 0 |
| PG | 6 | (Turkey) Gökşen Fitik | 6 | 1 | 5 |
| SF | 7 | (Turkey) Sehernaz Çidal | DNP | | |
| PG | 11 | (Turkey) Derin Erdoğan | 0 | 0 | 1 |
| PF | 12 | (Turkey) Zeynep Şevval Gül | 0 | 0 | 0 |
| F | 14 | (Hungary) Dorka Juhász | 5 | 2 | 0 |
| PF | 34 | (Finland) Awak Kuier | 10 | 6 | 2 |
Head coach:
(Turkish Basketball Federation) Fırat Okul

== See also ==
- 2025–26 Women's Basketball Super League
