= 2026 Turkish Women's Basketball Presidential Cup =

Fenerbahçe	Galatasaray
- Date: 9 December 2026
- Venue: Kamil Ocak Sport Hall, Gaziantep

The 2026 Turkish Women's Basketball Presidential Cup (Turkish: 2026 Kadınlar Basketbol Cumhurbaşkanlığı Kupası) will be the 31st edition of the Turkish Women's Basketball Presidential Cup. The game will be played between Fenerbahçe Tarfin, champions of the 2025–26 Women's Basketball Super League, also winners of the 2026 Turkish Women's Basketball Cup and Galatasaray Çağdaş Faktoring, runners-up of the 2025–26 Women's Basketball Super League and 2026 Turkish Women's Basketball Cup.

== Venue ==
Gaziantep	2026 Turkish Women's Basketball Presidential Cup (Turkey)
Kamil Ocak Sport Hall	2026 Turkish Women's Basketball Presidential Cup (Turkey)
Capacity: 2,500	2026 Turkish Women's Basketball Presidential Cup (Turkey)

== Match details ==
=== Details ===
9 December 2026	Fenerbahçe Tarfin	vs.	Galatasaray Çağdaş Faktoring	Gaziantep
19:00 TRT (UTC+3)
		Boxscore		Arena: Kamil Ocak Sport Hall
