= Morgan Jones =

Morgan Jones may refer to:

- Morgan Jones (actor, born 1879) (1879–1951), American silent film actor and screenwriter
- Morgan Jones (actor, born 1928) (1928–2012), American film and television actor
- Morgan Jones (broadcaster), Welsh television presenter
- Morgan Jones (British politician) (1886–1939), Labour Member of Parliament for Caerphilly, 1921–1939
- Morgan Jones (American politician) (1830–1894), United States Representative from New York, 1865–1867, Democrat
- Morgan Jones (alpine skier) (born 1968), British former alpine skier
- Morgan Jones (railroad builder) (1839–1926), American railroad builder
- Morgan Jones (cricketer) (1829–1905), Welsh cricketer
- Morgan Jones (rugby union) (born 1999), Welsh rugby union player
- Morgan Jones (The Walking Dead), fictional character from The Walking Dead franchise
- Morgan Jones, pseudonym of Dylan Davies, the fraudulent main source on the retracted 60 Minutes report on the Benghazi Attack in 2012
