= Hasan Fırat Okul =

Turkish basketball coach

Fırat Okul

Nesibe Aydın
- Position: Head coach

Personal information
- Born: January 7, 1980 (age 46) Istanbul, Turkey
- Coaching career: 2002–present

Career history

Coaching
- 2015–2017: İstanbul Üniversitesi
- 2017–2018: Fenerbahçe
- 2019–2024: İzmit Belediyespor
- 2023–2025: Turkey (assistant)
- 2024–2025: Danilo's Pizza
- 2025: Galatasaray (assistant)
- 2025–2026: Galatasaray
- 2026–present: Nesibe Aydın

Hasan Fırat Okul (born January 7, 1980) is a Turkish professional basketball coach.

== Career ==
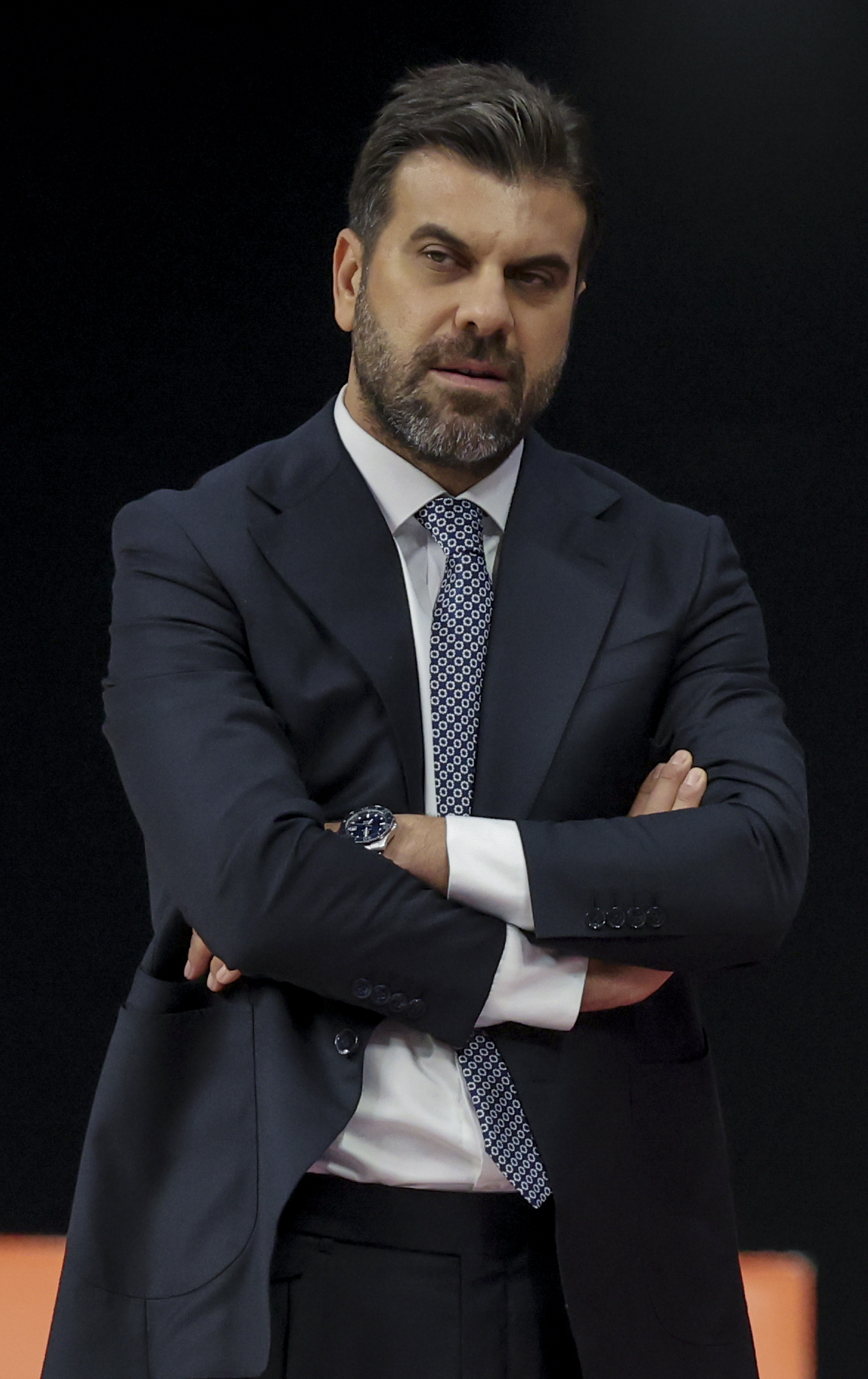
Okul in 2024

=== Fenerbahçe ===
In April 2017, he was appointed as the head coach of Fenerbahçe.

=== Turkey (assistant) ===
He served as the assistant coach of the Turkish women's national basketball team between 2023 and 2025.

=== Danilo's Pizza ===
June 2024, it was announced that he became the head coach of the Danilo's Pizza team.

=== Galatasaray ===
It was announced that he took on the role of Galatasaray assistant coach on July 2, 2025.

On 22 November 2025, Okul became the new head coach of Galatasaray, which parted ways with Ekrem Memnun.

== Personal life ==
He is also married to former basketball player Ayşe İvegin.
