= Gökşen Fitik =

Turkish basketball player

No. 6 – Galatasaray
- Position: Point guard
- League: Turkish Super League; EuroLeague Women

Personal information
- Born: August 11, 2001 (age 25) Seyhan, Adana, Turkey
- Listed height: 5 ft 9 in (1.75 m)

Career information
- Playing career: 2016–present

Career history
- 2016–2017: BOTAŞ
- 2017–2021: Çukurova Basketbol
- 2021–2024: Ormanspor
- 2024–present: Galatasaray
Medals
Women's basketball
Representing Turkey
Islamic Solidarity Games
Bronze medal – third place	2021 Konya	3x3 basketball

Gökşen Fitik (born 11 August 2001) is a Turkish basketball player for Galatasaray and the Turkish national team.

== Career ==
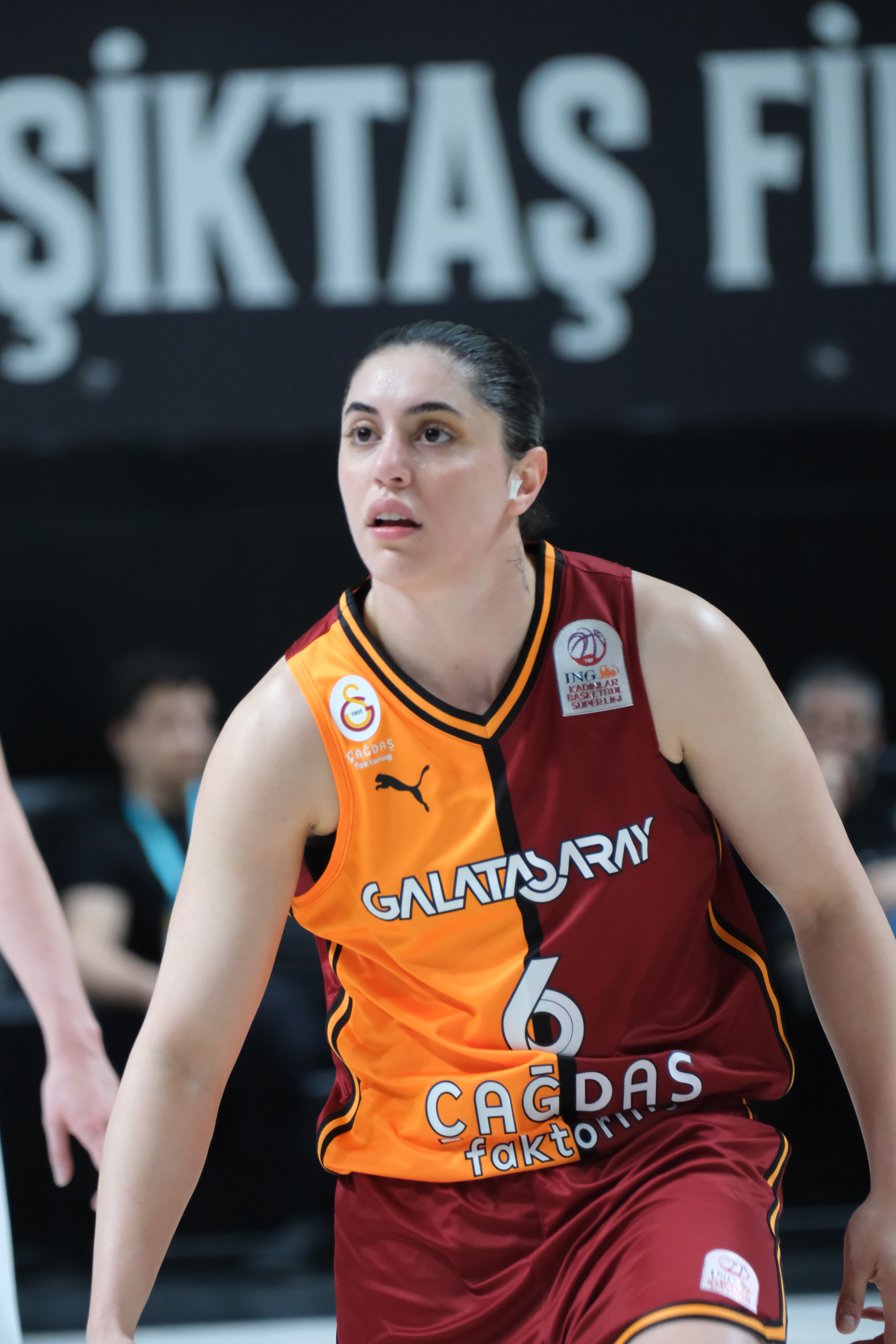
Fitik in 2025

She signed a contract with Ormanspor on 25 June 2021.

On 24 May 2024, it was announced that she signed a 2-year contract with the Galatasaray.

On 16 May 2025, she signed a new contract with Galatasaray, valid until the end of the 2025–26 season.

She signed a new two-year contract with Galatasaray on July 9, 2026.
