= Kamiah Smalls =

American basketball player (born 1998)

No. 3 – Galatasaray
- Position: Shooting guard
- League: Turkish Super League; EuroLeague Women

Personal information
- Born: April 17, 1998 (age 28) Philadelphia, Pennsylvania, U.S.
- Listed height: 5 ft 10 in (1.78 m)
- Listed weight: 161 lb (73 kg)

Career information
- High school: Neumann Goretti (Philadelphia, Pennsylvania)
- College: James Madison (2016–2020)
- WNBA draft: 2020: 3rd round, 28th overall pick
- Drafted by: Indiana Fever
- Playing career: 2020–present

Career history
- 2020: Indiana Fever
- 2020–2021: Empoli
- 2021–2022: AZS Lublino
- 2022: Minnesota Lynx
- 2022–2024: ESB Villeneuve-d'Ascq
- 2024–2025: Reyer Venezia
- 2025–present: Galatasaray
- 2025: Atlanta Dream
- 2026: Portland Fire

Career highlights
- Italian Basketball Super Cup Champion (2025); Ligue Féminine de Basketball Champion (2024); CAA Player of the Year (2020); 3× First-team All-CAA (2018–2020); CAA Rookie of the Year (2017); CAA All-Rookie Team (2017)
- Stats at WNBA.com
- Stats at Basketball Reference

Kamiah Smalls (born April 17, 1998) is an American basketball player who most recently played for the Portland Fire of the WNBA. She was drafted by the Indiana Fever with the 28th overall pick of the 2020 WNBA draft.

== WNBA career ==
=== Indiana Fever ===
Smalls was drafted by the Indiana Fever in the third round (28th overall) of the 2020 WNBA draft. She was cut by the Fever on May 19, 2020, but was brought back to the team after Erica Wheeler was ruled out due to a positive COVID-19 test. In her debut against the Chicago Sky on August 31, 2020, she came off the bench and scored 13 on a perfect 4-for-4 shooting, including 3-for-3 from 3-point range. Smalls became the fourth player in Fever history to score at least 13 points in her debut.

=== Connecticut Sun ===
Smalls signed a training camp deal with the Connecticut Sun on February 1, 2021. She was waived by the Sun on May 12, 2021, after failing to make the final roster.

=== Minnesota Lynx ===
Smalls signed a hardship contract with the Lynx on June 1, 2022. She appeared for Minnesota that day in their game against the Atlanta Dream off the bench. Smalls appeared in 3 games for the Lynx before being released from her hardship contract.

=== Atlanta Dream ===
On August 1, 2025, Smalls signed a 7-Day Contract with the Atlanta Dream.

=== Portland Fire ===
In April 2026, Smalls signed with the Portland Fire.

On May 21, 2026, Smalls was waived by the Portland Fire.

== Overseas career ==
After getting cut by the Fever, Smalls signed with USE Scotti Rosa Empoli of Lega Basket Femminile.

On June 11, 2025, she signed with Galatasaray of the Turkish Women's Basketball Super League (TKBL).

On September 20, 2026, she signed a new one-year contract with Galatasaray.

== Career statistics ==
Legend
GP	Games played	GS	Games started	MPG	Minutes per game	RPG	Rebounds per game
APG	Assists per game	SPG	Steals per game	BPG	Blocks per game	PPG	Points per game
TO	Turnovers per game	FG%	Field-goal percentage	3P%	3-point field-goal percentage	FT%	Free-throw percentage
**Bold**	Career best	°	League leader

=== College ===
Year	Team	GP	GS	MPG	FG%	3P%	FT%	RPG	APG	SPG	BPG	TO	PPG
2016–17	James Madison	33	29	27.5	**.507**	.308	.753	5.5	1.7	1.0	0.2	2.1	9.8
2017–18	James Madison	**34**	**34**	**31.7**	.401	.283	.729	**6.1**	2.6	**1.6**	**0.4**	3.5	15.0
2018–19	James Madison	**34**	33	29.1	.461	**.380**	.827	5.2	2.6	1.6	0.3	3.2	15.6
2019–20	James Madison	29	29	30.5	.471	**.380**	**.874**	5.3	**2.9**	1.4	0.3	**3.7**	**18.6**
**Career**		130	125	29.7	.452	.343	.802	5.5	2.4	1.2	0.3	3.1	14.5

=== WNBA ===
Year	Team	GP	GS	MPG	FG%	3P%	FT%	RPG	APG	SPG	BPG	TO	PPG
2020	Indiana	**7**	**0**	**14.3**	**.450**	**.583**	**1.000**	1.1	**2.0**	0.1	**0.1**	**0.3**	**3.9**
2022	Minnesota	3	0	11.3	.250	.000	.000	**1.7**	**2.0**	**1.3**	0.0	1.3	1.3
2025	Atlanta	3	0	1.0	.000	.000	.000	0.0	0.0	0.0	0.0	0.0	0.0
**Career**	3 years, 3 teams	13	0	10.5	.393	.438	1.000	1.0	1.5	0.4	0.1	0.5	2.4
