= Awak Kuier =

Finnish basketball player (born 2001)

- Kuier with Galatasaray in 2026

No. 34 – Galatasaray
- Position: Forward
- League: Turkish Super League; EuroLeague Women; WNBA

Personal information
- Born: 19 August 2001 (age 25) Cairo, Egypt
- Listed height: 6 ft 6 in (1.98 m)
- Listed weight: 168 lb (76 kg)

Career information
- High school: Mäkelänrinne Upper Secondary School (Helsinki, Finland)
- WNBA draft: 2021: 1st round, 2nd overall pick
- Drafted by: Dallas Wings

Career history
- 2016–2017: Peli-Karhut
- 2017–2020: HBA-Märsky
- 2020–2022: Virtus Eirene Ragusa
- 2021–2023: Dallas Wings
- 2022–2025: Reyer Venezia
- 2025–present: Galatasaray
- 2026–present: Dallas Wings

Career highlights
- Italian League (LBF) champion (2024); Italian League Finals MVP (2024); Italian League Best Foreign Player (2024); FIBA U18 Women's Euro Championship Division B MVP (2019); Naisten Korisliiga Most Improved Player (2019)
- Stats at Basketball Reference

Awak Sabit Bior Kuier (born 19 August 2001) is a Finnish professional basketball player who plays for the Dallas Wings of the Women's National Basketball Association (WNBA) and for Galatasaray in the Turkish Women's Basketball Super League and in the EuroLeague Women. She competes internationally for the Finnish national team. Selected by the Wings with the second overall pick in the 2021 WNBA draft, she was the second Finnish player in the history of the league after Taru Tuukkanen to be drafted, and she became the first Finnish player to play in the WNBA in May 2021.

== Career ==
=== Peli-Karhut (2016–2017) ===
Growing up in the city of Kotka, Kuier was discovered for basketball by a neighbour at age 10, when she stood already 180 cm tall. The man contacted Mikko Kokkola, who was coaching basketball at the local Peli-Karhut, and Kokkola invited her to practice. Kuier joined the club. She was named the U16-league Player of the Season in 2015–16. She debuted in top-tier Naisten Korisliiga with PeKa first team in the 2016–17 season. At the age of 14, a video of her dunking went viral online.

=== HBA-Märsky (2017–2020) ===
In 2017, at the age of 16, she joined the Helsinki Basketball Academy team HBA-Märsky. Kuier played in Naisten Korisliiga with HBA team, and was named the Most Improved Player in the league in 2019. She was also named the league's Player of the Month in January 2020.

=== Virtus Eirene Ragusa (2020–2022) ===
Declining offers from American universities, she signed a professional contract with a Lega Basket Femminile (LBF) team Virtus Eirene Ragusa (Passalacqua Ragusa) in 2020.

=== Dallas Wings (2021–2023) ===
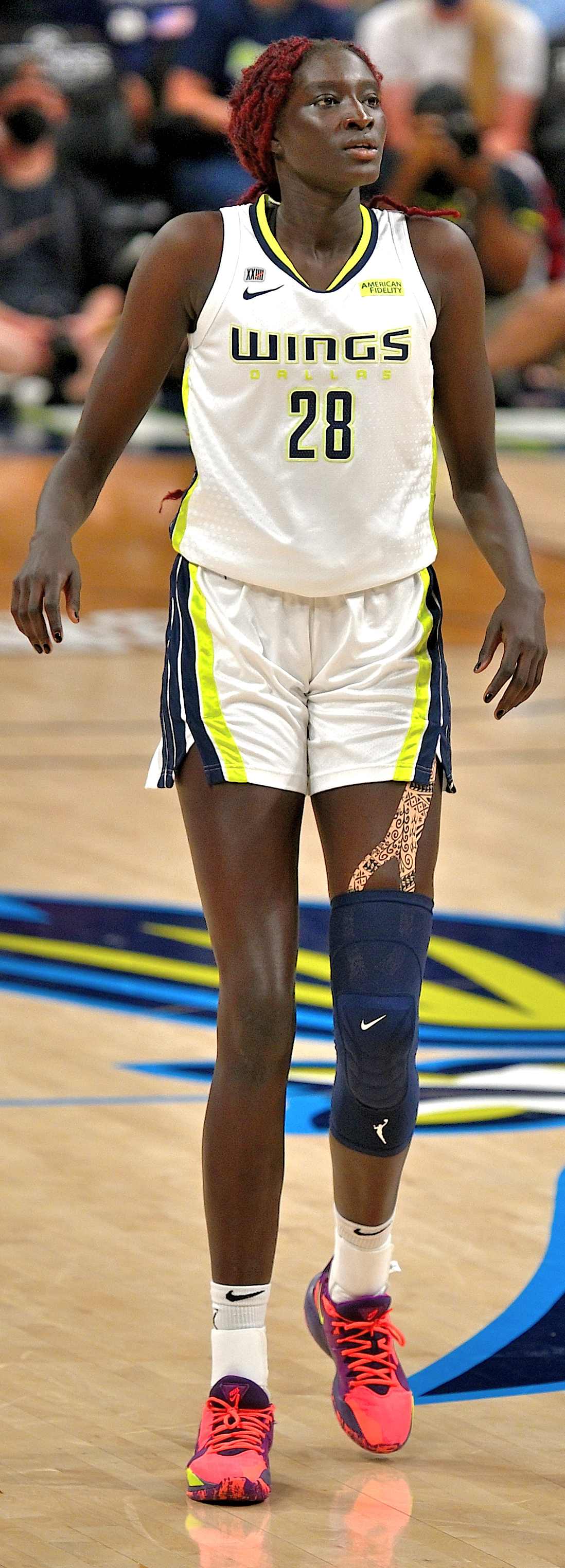
Kuier with the Dallas Wings in 2021.

Selected second overall in the 2021 WNBA draft by the Dallas Wings, she was the first non-American player since Australia's Liz Cambage in 2011 to be selected in the first five picks of the draft. After missing the first few games of the 2021 season, she made her debut for the Wings on 27 May, scoring a point, a rebound, and an assist in seven minutes of game time in a 101–95 loss to the Atlanta Dream. In addition to her speed and resilience, Kuier's features also include an exceptionally large wingspan of about seven feet. On 10 June 2022, in a game against the Seattle Storm, Kuier became the eighth woman in WNBA history to dunk a basketball.

On 22 January 2024, Kuier announced that she would skip the 2024 WNBA season. This is due to overlapping seasons between Italy and the United States, and the strict change in WNBA rules concerning absences related to playing in Europe. Kuier has stated that her dream is to compete in the EuroLeague Women.

In April 2026, Kuier signed a one-year deal with the Wings ahead of the 2026 WNBA season.

=== Reyer Venezia (2022–2025) ===
Since June 2022, Kuier has also played for Italian team Reyer Venezia during winter seasons in Europe, competing in Lega Basket Femminile and EuroCup.

In May 2024, Kuier helped Reyer Venezia to win the Italian championship title. She was also named the Finals MVP with her 24-point performance in the decisive third final match. The team also advanced to the semi-finals of the EuroCup. In July 2024, Kuier extended her contract with Venezia. In September, she was named the Best Foreign Player in the Italian league.

On 10 October 2024, Kuier made her debut in the EuroLeague for Venezia, recording 14 points, six rebounds, three assists and two blocks in an 80–59 win over Hungarian UNI Győr.

=== Galatasaray (2025–) ===
On 4 June 2025, she signed with Galatasaray of the Turkish Women's Basketball Super League (TKBL).

She extended her contract with Galatasaray for one year on 7 July 2026.

== International career ==
She represented Finland at the 2019 U18 B FIBA Women's European Championship tournament, winning the championship and being named tournament MVP. She was then named to the All-Star Five at the 2019 U20 B FIBA Women's European Championship, helping Finland to a second-place finish. Since 2019, she has represented Finland senior national team.

== WNBA career statistics ==
=== Regular season ===
Year	Team	GP	GS	MPG	FG%	3P%	FT%	RPG	APG	SPG	BPG	TO	PPG
2021	Dallas	16	0	8.9	.308	.167	.786	2.4	.6	.3	.8	1.0	2.4
2022	Dallas	33	0	12.6	.395	.190	.613	2.5	.9	.4	.9	.6	2.8
2023	Dallas	37	4	10.8	.396	.087	.778	2.5	.5	.2	.6	.6	2.6
2026	Dallas	41	26	18.6	.508	.390	.714	3.9	1.0	.6	1.8	1.0	6.3
Career	4 years, 1 team	127	30	13.6	.440	.285	.711	3.0	.8	.4	1.1	.8	3.8

=== Postseason ===
Year	Team	GP	GS	MPG	FG%	3P%	FT%	RPG	APG	SPG	BPG	TO	PPG
2021	Dallas	1	0	8.0	.000	—	—	3.0	.0	.0	.0	1.0	.0
2022	Dallas	3	0	5.0	.000	.000	—	1.7	.0	.0	.7	.0	.0
2023	Dallas	5	0	10.4	.643	.286	.000	1.4	.2	.6	.8	.8	4.0
2026	Dallas	3	3	27.3	.467	.143	1.000	4.0	.7	.0	1.3	1.3	5.3
Career	4 years, 1 team	12	3	13.1	.485	.176	.333	2.3	.3	.3	.8	.8	3.0

== Career statistics ==
=== EuroLeague ===
Year	Team	GP	GS	MPG	FG%	3P%	FT%	RPG	APG	SPG	BPG	TO	PPG
2024–25	Umana Reyer Venezia	2		30.1	.522	.273	.333	5.0	2.5	1.5	1.5	2.5	14.0

=== EuroCup ===
Year	Team	GP	GS	MPG	FG%	3P%	FT%	RPG	APG	SPG	BPG	TO	PPG
2022–23	Umana Reyer Venezia	14		27.4	.508	.333	.605	5.1	1.9	1.1	1.5	2.4	12.4
2023–24	Umana Reyer Venezia	12		21.5	.400	.222	.737	4.4	1.7	.8	1.5	1.5	8.7

== Personal life ==
She was born in Cairo, Egypt and is of South Sudanese origin. She moved to Finland as a refugee with her family when she was two years old, first settling in the city of Kotka. Today, her family has settled in the coastal town of Uusikaupunki and she holds dual Finnish and Egyptian citizenship. She speaks Italian, Arabic, Finnish, and English. Kuier has four older brothers and her parents are Jehovah's Witnesses. Kuier and her family are close friends with Federiko Federiko and his family, who share a similar background.
