= Derin Erdoğan =

Turkish basketball player (2002)

No. 11 – Galatasaray
- Position: Point guard
- League: Turkish Super League; EuroLeague Women

Personal information
- Born: 28 June 2002 (age 24) Istanbul, Turkey
- Listed height: 5 ft 6 in (1.68 m)

Career information
- College: Arizona Wildcats (2020–2022); Northeastern Huskies (2022–2024)
- Playing career: 2018–present

Career history
- 2018–2020: Istanbul Üniversitesi
- 2024–present: Galatasaray

Career highlights
- First team All-CAA (2023)
- Stats at WNBA.com
- Stats at Basketball Reference

Derin Erdoğan (born 28 June 2002) is a Turkish female basketball player. The 5 ft 6 in (1.68 m) tall national plays point guard. Currently, she plays for Northeastern Huskies in the U.S. She was part of the Turkey U-16, Turkey U-18 and Turkey U-20 teams before she was admitted to the Turkey team.

== Club career ==
Erdoğan was a member of Istanbul University SC, and Arizona Wildcats. She played in 14 games in the 2020–21 and in 13 games in the 2021–22 season. She appeared in 3 postseason games and was a member of the 2020–21 Final Four champion and national runner-up Arizona Wildcats women's basketball team. After two years at Arizona, she moved in 2022 to Northeastern Huskies, an NCAA Division I women's basketball program in Boston, where she was a starter for 3 seasons.

=== Galatasaray ===
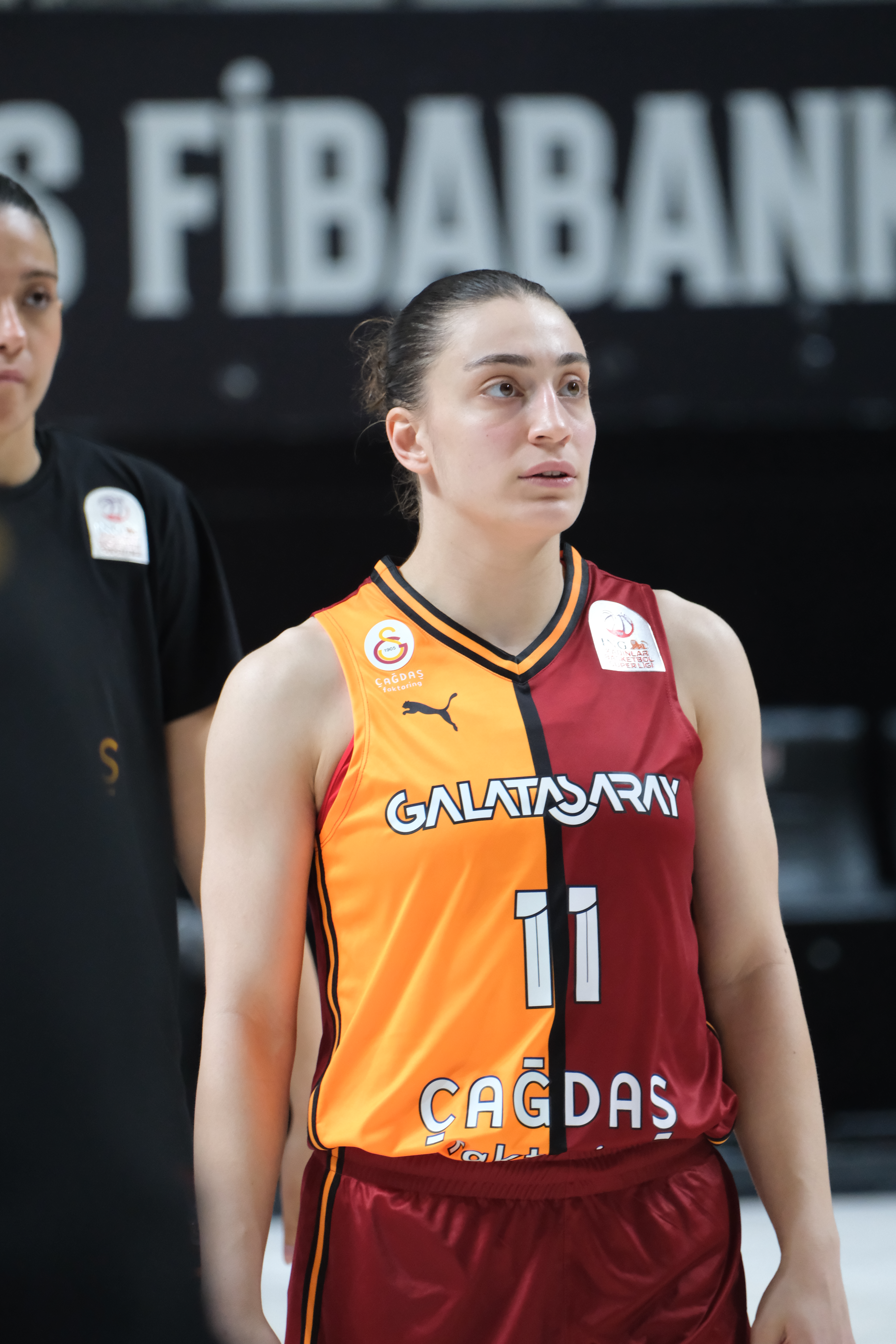
Erdoğan in 2025

On 24 May 2024, it was announced that she signed a 1-year contract with the Galatasaray.

On 16 May 2025, she signed a new contract with Galatasaray, valid until the end of the 2025–26 season.

She signed a new two-year contract with Galatasaray on July 11, 2026.

== International career ==
She was part of the national U-16 team, which won the bronze medal at the 2017 European Youth Summer Olympic Festival in Győr, Hungary. She played also at the 2018 FIBA U16 Women's European Championship.

She was with the Turkey U-18 team at the 2019 FIBA U18 Women's European Championship Division B.

As a member of the Turkey U-20 team, she played in four matches of the 2022 FIBA U20 Women's European Championship Division B.

Erdoğan was admitted to the national team. She played at the EuroBasket Women 2023 qualification.

== Personal life ==
Derin Erdoğan was born to Haydar and Canan Erdoğan in Istanbul, Turkey on 28 June 2002. From 2020 on, she studied two years at University of Arizona before transferring to Northeastern University.

== Honours ==
=== Individual ===
Turkish Girls' U18 Championship

Best Guard (1): 2018–19.

=== Clubs ===
Turkish Girls' U18 Championship

Istanbul University SC
Runners-up: (1) 2018–19.

=== National teams ===
Turkey U-16
Third places: (1) 2017 European Youth Summer Olympic Festival

Turkey U-18.

Third places: (1) 2019 FIBA U18 Women's European Championship Division B.

Turkey U-20
Runners-up: (1) 2022 FIBA U20 Women's European Championship Division B
