= Sehernaz Çidal =

Turkish basketball player (born 1995)

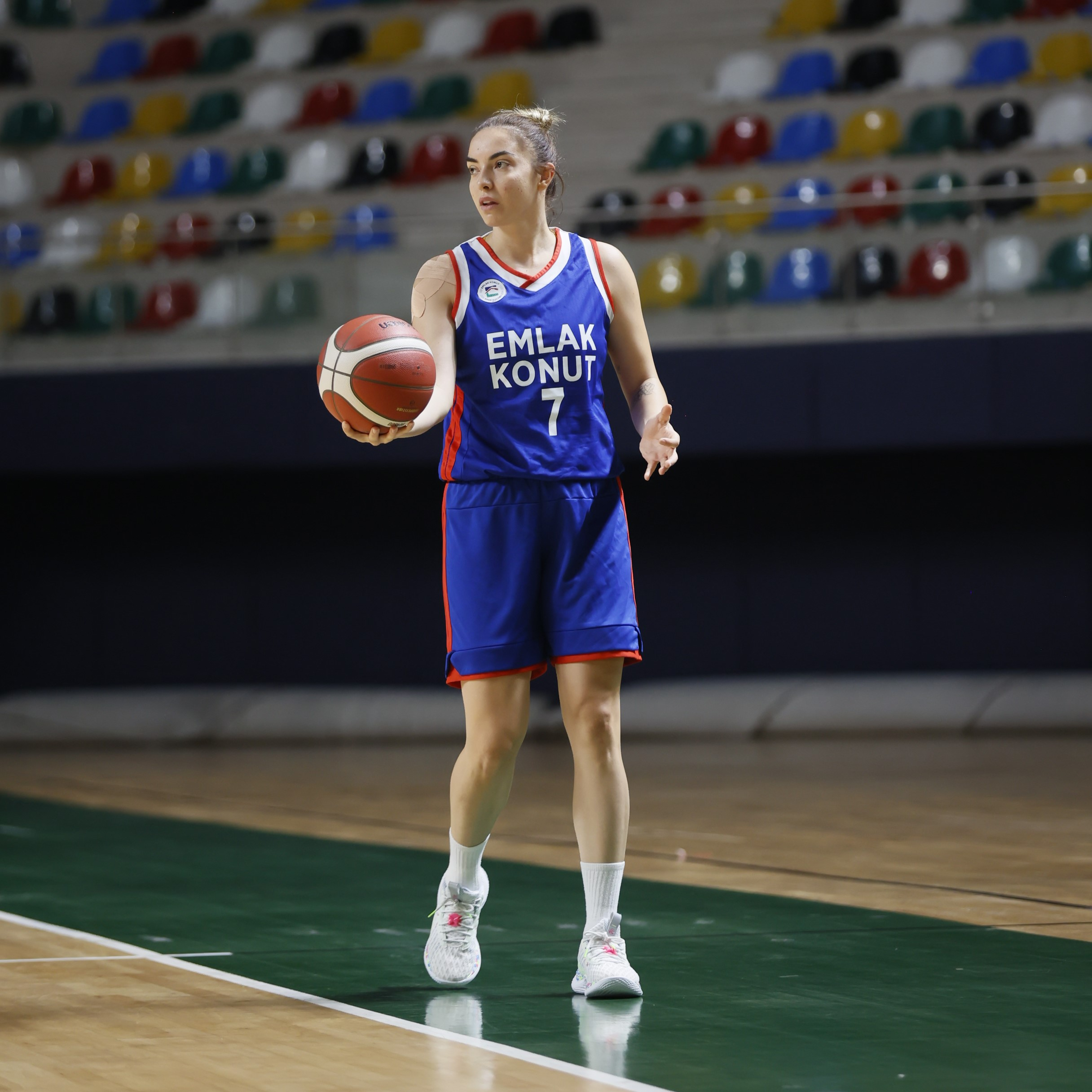

Personal information
- Born: 18 April 1995 (age 31) Adana, Turkey
- Listed height: 1.83 m (6 ft 0 in)

Career information
- Playing career: 2011–present
- Position: Small forward

Career history
- 2011–2016: Botaş SK
- 2014: → İzmir Eda Spor
- 2016–2017: Elazığ İl Özel İdarespor
- 2019–2020: Mardin Büyükşehir Başakspor
- 2020–2023: Botaş SK
- 2023–2025: Emlak Konut
- 2025–2026: Galatasaray

Sehernaz Çidal (born 18 April 1995) is a Turkish female basketball player. The 1.83 m (6 ft 0 in) tall national plays Small forward.

== Club career ==
On 14 June 2025, it was announced that she signed a 1–year contract with the Galatasaray.
