= Elif Bayram =

Turkish basketball player (born 2001)

No. 17 – Galatasaray
- Position: Power forward
- League: Turkish Super League; EuroLeague Women

Personal information
- Born: 18 September 2001 (age 25) Istanbul, Turkey
- Listed height: 1.87 m (6 ft 2 in)

Career information
- Playing career: 2014–present

Career history
- 2016–2025: Beşiktaş JK
- 2025–present: Galatasaray

Elif Bayram (born 18 September 2001) is a Turkish female basketball player. The 1.87 m (6 ft 1 1/2 in) tall player plays power forward.

== Professional career ==
=== Beşiktaş JK ===
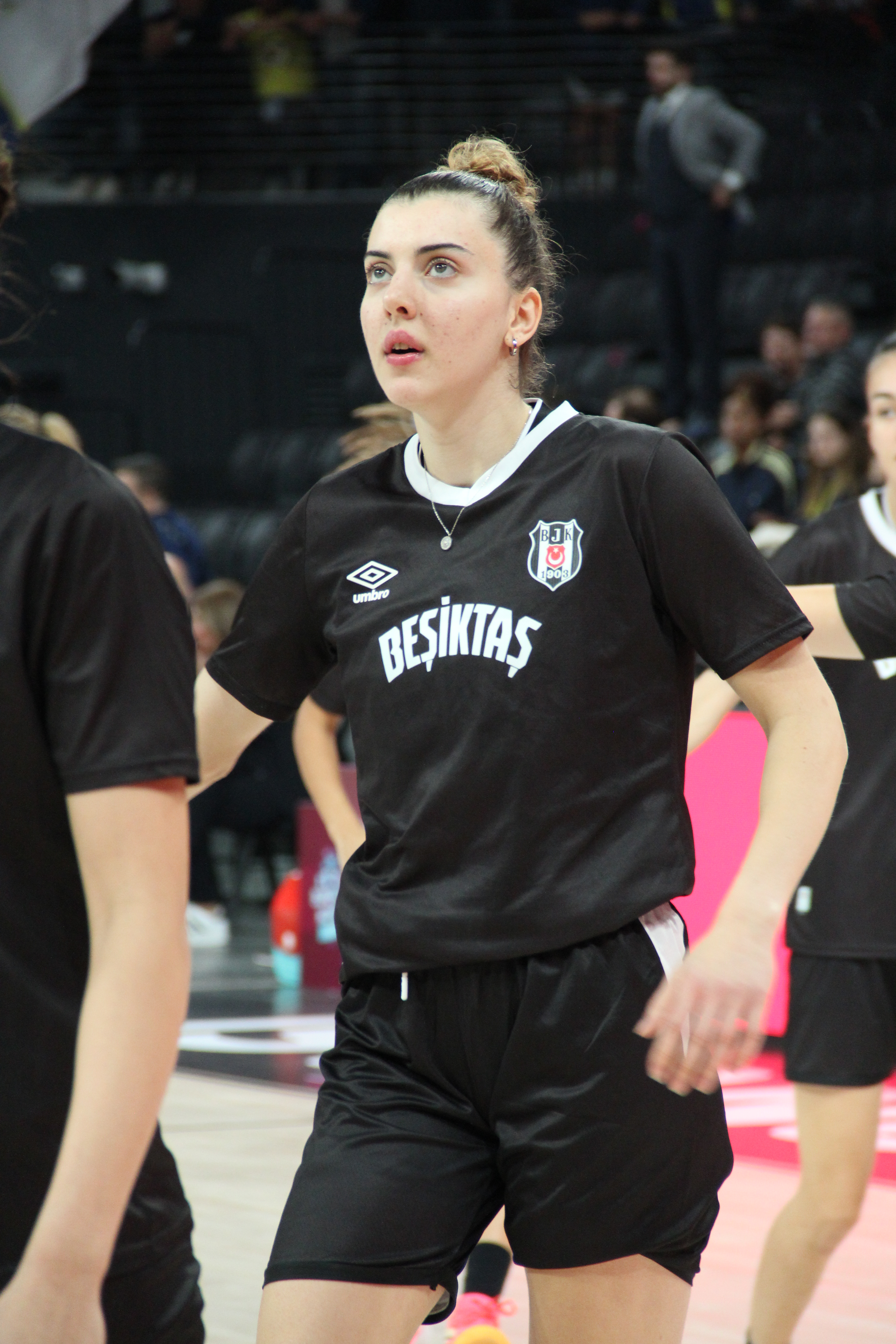
Bayram in 2024

Bayram started her basketball career in the farm team of Beşiktaş JK. In the 2018–19 season, she was promoted to the A team. She participated at the 2023–24 EuroLeague Women. In September 2023, she was honored in the women's category of the "Turkish Young Basketball Stars".

=== Galatasaray ===
On 6 June 2025, it was announced that she signed a 1-year contract with the Galatasaray.

On July 18, 2026, she signed a new one-year contract with Galatasaray.

== National Team career ==
She was part of the Turkey girls' national U-16 team at the 2017 FIBA U16 Women's European Championship.

She was part of the national U-16 team at the 2017 European Youth Summer Olympic Festival in Győr, Hungary that won the bronze medal. Admitted to the Turkey national team, she played at the EuroBasket Women 2023 qualification.
