= Ayşe Cora =

Turkish basketball player

Ayşe Cora Yamaner
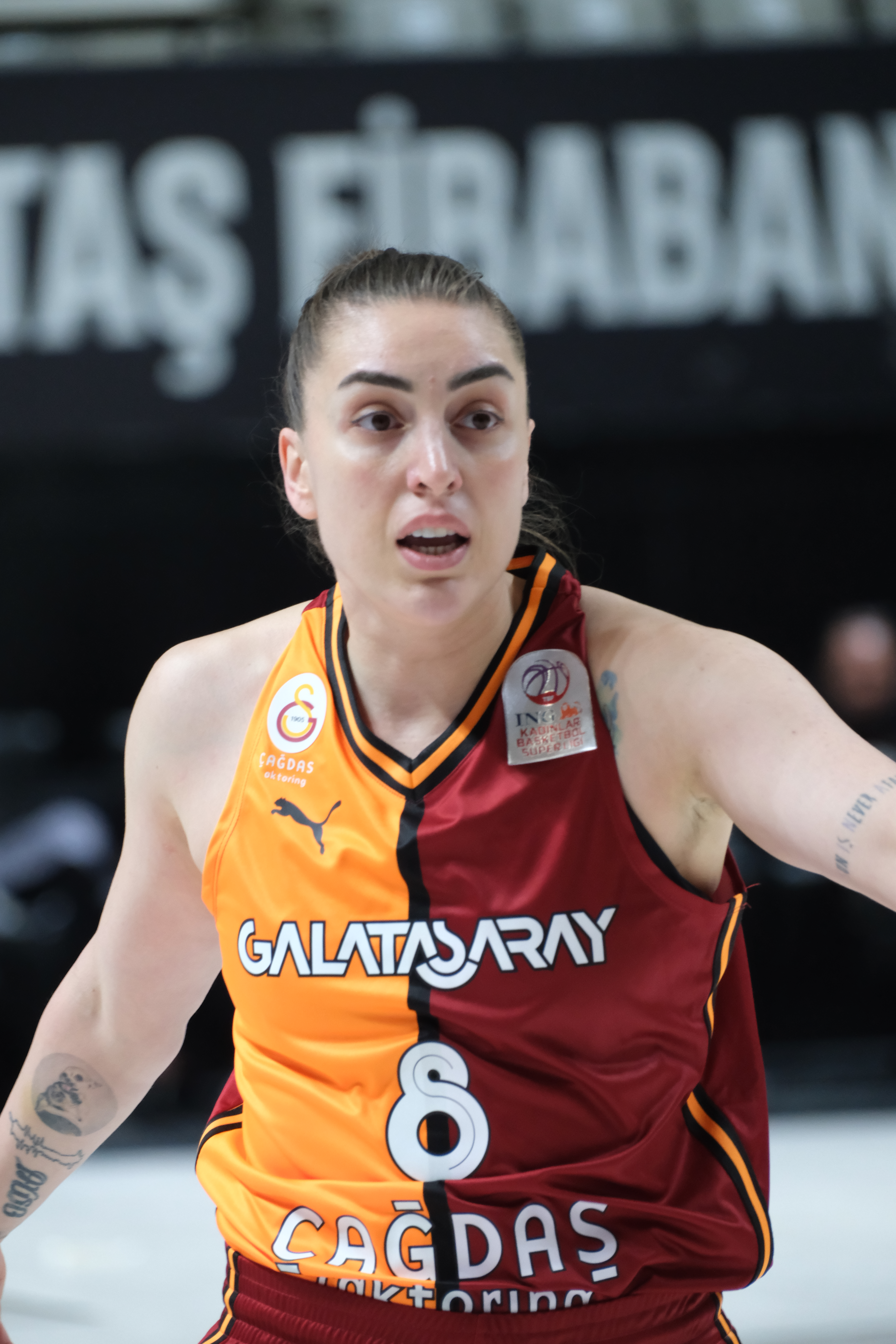

Personal information
- Born: 3 March 1993 (age 33) Istanbul, Turkey
- Listed height: 5 ft 10 in (1.78 m)
- Listed weight: 152 lb (69 kg)

Career information
- Playing career: 2005–present
- Position: Shooting guard

Career history
- 2005–2008: Migrosspor
- 2008–2011: Beşiktaş
- 2011–2014: Galatasaray
- 2014–2015: Edirnespor
- 2015–2016: Beşiktaş
- 2016–2020: Fenerbahçe
- 2020–2022: Botaş SK
- 2022: Hatay Büyükşehir Belediye SK
- 2022–2023: Çankaya Üniversitesi SK
- 2023–2024: İzmit Belediyespor
- 2024–2026: Galatasaray

Career highlights
- EuroLeague champion (2014); 3× Turkish Super League champion (2014, 2018, 2019); 2× Turkish Presidential Cup champion (2011, 2019); 5× Turkish Cup champion (2012, 2013, 2014, 2019, 2020)

Ayşe Cora Yamaner (born 3 March 1993) is a Turkish professional basketball player for Galatasaray.

== Career ==
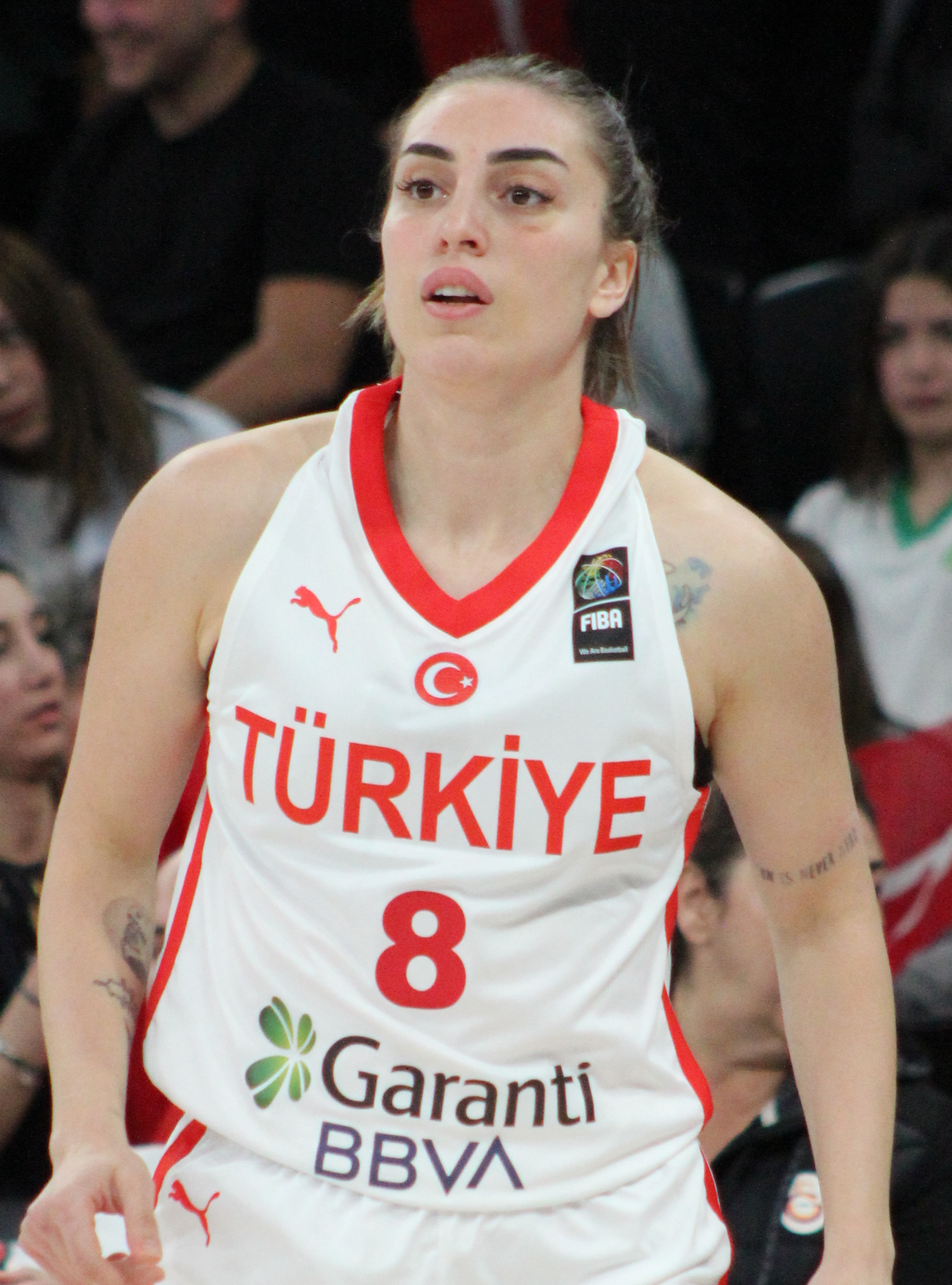
Cora in 2024

On 24 May 2024, it was announced that she signed a 1-year contract with the Galatasaray.

On 16 May 2025, she signed a new contract with Galatasaray, valid until the end of the 2025–26 season.

== Honors ==
=== National ===
- 2012 FIBA Europe Under-20 Championship for Women – Bronze
- 2013 FIBA Europe Under-20 Championship for Women – Bronze

=== Club ===
- 2x Turkish Women's Basketball League champion (2018, 2019)
- 2x Turkish Women's Basketball Cup champion (2019, 2020)
- Turkish Women's Basketball Presidential Cup champion (2019)
