= Galatasaray S.K. women's basketball team rosters =

This article contains past rosters of the Galatasaray S.K. (women's basketball) team.

== 1990 Era ==
=== 1991–92 ===
Roster

- (Turkey) Aycan Yeniley
- (Turkey) Canan Nilgün Bakır
- (United States) Cassandra Crumpton
- (Turkey) Elvan Dal
- (Turkey) Etkin Ünal
- (Turkey) Fitnat Müge Kolday
- (Turkey) Funda Tahmaz
- (Turkey) Hatice Müge Teker
- (United States) Jacqueline, Ann Farmer
- (Turkey) Nurgül Söylemez
- (Turkey) Özlem Özbek
- (Turkey) Pınar Baysan
- (Turkey) Zeynepgül Onay
- Coach: (United States) Betsy Ann Bailey

=== 1992–93 ===
Roster

- (Turkey) Aysun Olgunsoy
- (Turkey) Berrin Handan Özbek
- (Turkey) Canan Nilgün Bakır
- (Turkey) Çelen Kılınç
- (Turkey) Derya Taşçı
- (Turkey) Etkin Ünal
- (Turkey) Funda Tahmaz
- (United States) Marla Joan Maupin
- (Turkey) Özlem Özbek
- (Turkey) Pınar Çapar
- (United States) Sharon Lynn Stewart
- (Turkey) Zeynepgül Onay
- Coach: (United States) Betsy Ann Bailey

=== 1993–94 ===
Roster

- (Turkey) Aysun Olgunsoy
- (Turkey) Berrin Handan Özbek
- (Turkey) Canan Nilgün Bakır
- (United States) Clarissa Davis
- (Turkey) Çelen Kılınç
- (Turkey) Derya Taşçı
- (Turkey) Didem Akın
- (Turkey) Funda Tahmaz
- (Turkey) Gülizar Kalçalar
- (Turkey) Özlem Özbek
- (Turkey) Pınar Baysan
- (Turkey) Senem Yavuz
- (United States) Tari Lynne Phillips
- (Turkey) Zeynepgül Onay
- Coach: (United States) Betsy Ann Bailey

=== 1994–95 ===
Roster

- (Turkey) Aycan Yeniley
- (Turkey) Berrin Handan Özbek
- (Turkey) Canan Nilgün Bakır
- (United States) Clarissa Davis
- (Turkey) Çelen Kılınç
- (Turkey) Derya Taşçı
- (Turkey) Didem Akın
- (Turkey) Gülizar Kolçalar
- (Turkey) İlknur Soyupak
- (United States) Natalie Carmel Crawford
- (Turkey) Pınar Baysan
- (Turkey) Şenay Göksoy
- (Turkey) Zeynepgül Onay
- Coach: (Turkey) Zafer Kalaycıoğlu

=== 1995–96 ===
Roster

- (Turkey) Aycan Yeniley
- (Turkey) Berrin Handan Özbek
- (Turkey) Betül Sunter
- (United States) Clarissa Davis
- (Turkey) Çelen Kılınç
- (United States) Daedra Janel Charles
- (United States) Darla Bain Simpson
- (Turkey) Derya Taşçı
- (Turkey) Didem Akın
- (Turkey) Filiz Yükrük
- (Turkey) Gülizar Kalçalar
- (Turkey) Melisa Çakmak
- (Turkey) Zeynepgül Onay
- Coach: (Turkey) Zafer Kalaycıoğlu

=== 1996–97 ===
Roster

- (Turkey) Arzu Bildirir
- (Turkey) Aycan Yeniley
- (Turkey) Berrin Handan Özbek
- (Turkey) Betül Sunter
- (Turkey) Çelen Kılınç
- (Turkey) Derya Taşçı
- (Turkey) Didem Akın
- (Turkey) Filiz Yükrük
- (Turkey) Gülizar Kalçalar
- (United States) Katrina Felicia McClain
- (Turkey) Nihan Anaz
- (United States) Ruthie Bolton
- (Turkey) Serap Yücesir
- Coach: (Turkey) Ekrem Memnun

=== 1997–98 ===
Roster

- (Turkey) Arzu Bildirir
- (Turkey) Aycan Yeniley
- (Turkey) Berrin Handan Özbek
- (Turkey) Betül Sunter
- (Turkey) Çelen Kılınç
- (Turkey) Derya Taşçı
- (Turkey) Didem Akın
- (Turkey) Filiz Yükrük
- (Turkey) Gülizar Kalçalar
- (United States) Jennifer Gillom
- (United States) Linda Gail Burgess
- (Turkey) Nihan Anaz
- (United States) Sophia Witherspoon
- (Turkey) Zehra Aslı Karakurt
- Coach: (Turkey) Ekrem Memnun

=== 1998–99 ===
Roster

- (United States) Andrea Maria Stinson
- (Turkey) Aycan Yeniley
- (Turkey) Berat Zeynep Korur
- (Turkey) Berrin Handan Özbek
- (Turkey) Çelen Kılınç
- (Turkey) Derya Taşçı
- (Turkey) Gülizar Kalçalar
- (Turkey) Işıl Er
- (Croatia) Korana Longin-Zanze
- (Turkey) Nihan Anaz
- (Lithuania) Reda Aleliūnaitė-Jankovska
- (United States) Wendy Palmer
- Coach: (Turkey) Ekrem Memnun

== 2000 Era ==
=== 2000–01 ===
Roster

- (Turkey) Belgin Aktan
- (Turkey) Betül Sunter
- (Turkey) Çelen Kılınç
- (Turkey) Derya Taşçı
- (Turkey) Gülizar Kalçalar
- (Russia) Irina Routkovskaia
- (Croatia) Kristina Lelas Benković
- (Turkey) Nevriye Yılmaz
- (Turkey) Nihan Anaz
- (Lithuania) Reda Aleliūnaitė-Jankovska
- (United States) Rhonda Toyja Mapp
- (United States) Tamecka Dixon
- (Turkey) Tuğba Taşçı

=== 2003–04 ===
Roster

- (Turkey) Duygu Çarkçı
- (Turkey) Gamze Kandemir
- (Turkey) Gülçin Cantekin
- (Turkey) Hilal Yıldırım
- (Turkey) Mahizer Aytaş
- (Turkey) Nadide Çınar
- (Turkey) Nebahat Ceylan Emre
- (Turkey) Pelin Tunç
- (Turkey) Saynur Tozlu
- (Turkey) Seda Tekindağ
- (Turkey) Tuğba Taşçı
- (Turkey) Tuğçe Canbaz
- Coach: ?

=== 2004–05 ===
Roster

- (Turkey) Begüm Yaylım
- (Turkey) Belgin Onbaşı
- (Turkey) Beril Binoğul
- (United States) Cricket Williams
- (United States) Crystal Givens
- (Turkey) Duygu Çarkçı
- (Turkey) Duygu Kapkın
- (Turkey) Gamze Kandemir
- (Turkey) Gülçin Cantekin
- (Turkey) Hilal Yıldırım
- (United States) Monica Raquel Roberts
- (Turkey) Nebahat Ceylan Emre
- (Turkey) Saynur Tozlu
- (Turkey) Seda Tekindağ
- (Serbia and Montenegro) Snežana Mirkov
- (Turkey) Tuğba Taşçı
- (Turkey) Tuğçe Canbaz
- Coach: (Turkey) Müge Berkalp

=== 2005–06 ===
Roster

- (Turkey) Begüm Yaylım
- (Turkey) Bengü Türk
- (Turkey) Beril Binoğul
- (Turkey) Duygu Kapkın
- (Turkey) Gülçin Cantekin
- (Turkey) Nebahat Ceylan Emre
- (Turkey) Nilüfer Dağ
- (Turkey) Saynur Tozlu
- (Turkey) Seda Tekindağ
- (Turkey) Sevda Esenler
- (Turkey) Tuğçe Canbaz
- (Turkey) Ümmühan Muriç
- Coach: (Turkey) Ayhan Avcı

=== 2006–07 ===
Roster

- (Turkey) Banu Yıllar
- (Turkey) Bengü Türk
- (Turkey) Beril Binoğul
- (United States) Chantelle Anderson
- (United States) Crystal Marie Smith
- (Turkey) Gülçin Cantekin
- (Turkey) Gülizar Sezer
- (United States) Loree Moore
- (United States) Melshika Shanell Bowman
- (Turkey) Nebahat Ceylan Emre
- (Turkey) Nesibe Burcu Atalay
- (Turkey) Nihan Anaz
- (United States) Nikki Teasley
- (Turkey) Pelin Küççük
- (Turkey) Saynur Tozlu
- (Turkey) Seda Tekindağ
- (United States) Tangela Smith
- (United States) Trisha Ranee Hughes Skibbe
- (Turkey) Yasemen Saylar
- Coach: (Turkey) Ayhan Avcı

=== 2007–08 ===
Roster

- (Turkey) Beril Binoğul
- (United States) Chantelle Anderson
- (Turkey) Didem Sarıca
- (Turkey) Esra Şencebe
- (Turkey) Gülşah Akkaya
- (Turkey) Işıl Alben
- (Hungary) Petra Ujhelyi
- (Turkey) Sariye Gökçe
- (Turkey) Saynur Tozlu
- (United States) Sophia Young
- (Turkey) Şebnem Kimyacıoğlu
- (United States) Vickie Johnson
- (Turkey) Yasemen Saylar
- Coach: (Turkey) Cem Akdağ

=== 2008–09 ===
Roster

- (Turkey) Bahar Çağlar
- (Turkey) Beril Binoğul
- (Turkey) Esra Şencebe
- (Turkey) Işıl Alben
- (United States) Kara Braxton
- (United States) Kiesha Brown
- (United States) (Turkey) Korel Engin
- (Turkey) Kübra Siyahdemir
- (Belarus) Marina Kress
- (United States) Seimone Augustus
- (United States) Sophia Young
- (Turkey) Şaziye İvegin-Karslı
- (United States) Taj McWilliams-Franklin
- (Turkey) Tuğba Palazoğlu
- (Turkey) Yasemen Saylar
- (Turkey) Yasemin Horasan
- Coach: (Turkey) Cem Akdağ / Hakan Acer / Okan Çevik

=== 2009–10 ===
Roster

- (Turkey) Bahar Çağlar
- (Turkey) Dilara Kaya
- (Turkey) Esra Şencebe
- (Turkey) Gizem Başaran
- (Turkey) Işıl Alben
- (Czech Republic) Ivana Večeřová
- (United States) Jia Perkins
- (United States) Katie Douglas
- (Turkey) Nilay Yiğit
- (United States) Sophia Young
- (United States) Tamika Catchings
- (Turkey) Tuğba Palazoğlu
- (Turkey) Yasemen Saylar
- (Turkey) Yasemin Horasan
- (Belarus) Yelena Leuchanka
- Coach: (Turkey) Zafer Kalaycıoğlu

== 2010 Era ==
=== 2010–11 ===
Roster

- (Turkey) Bahar Çağlar
- (Turkey) Dilara Kaya
- (United States) (Bulgaria) Doneeka Lewis
- (Lithuania) Gintarė Petronytė
- (Turkey) Gülşah Gümüşay
- (Turkey) Işıl Alben
- (United States) (Turkey) Melisa Can
- (United States) Monique Currie
- (Turkey) Nihan Anaz
- (United States) Seimone Augustus
- (United States) Sylvia Fowles
- (United States) Tamika Catchings
- (Turkey) Tuğba Palazoğlu
- (Turkey) Yasemen Saylar
- Coach: (Turkey) Ceyhun Yıldızoğlu

=== 2011–12 ===
Roster

- (Spain) Alba Torrens
- (Turkey) Ayşe Cora
- (Turkey) Bahar Çağlar
- (United States) Diana Taurasi
- (Lithuania) Eglė Šulčiūtė
- (United States) Epiphanny Prince
- (Turkey) Gülşah Gümüşay
- (Turkey) Işıl Alben
- (Serbia) Ivanka Matić
- (Turkey) İlayda Tokmak
- (United States) (Turkey) Melisa Can
- (Turkey) Sariye Kumral
- (United States) Sylvia Fowles
- (Turkey) Şaziye İvegin-Karslı
- (Portugal) Ticha Penicheiro
- (United States) Tina Charles
- (Turkey) Yasemen Saylar
- Coach: (Turkey) Ceyhun Yıldızoğlu

=== 2012–13 ===
Roster

- (Spain) Alba Torrens
- (Belgium) Ann Wauters
- (Turkey) Ayşe Cora
- (Turkey) Bahar Çağlar
- (Turkey) Gülşah Gümüşay
- (Turkey) Işıl Alben
- (United States) Lindsey Harding
- (United States) Lindsay Whalen
- (Turkey) Nevriye Yılmaz
- (Saint Vincent and the Grenadines) (Spain) Sancho Lyttle
- (United States) Shay Murphy
- (United States) Sylvia Fowles
- (Turkey) Şaziye İvegin
- (Turkey) Şebnem Kimyacıoğlu
- (Turkey) Özge Yavaş
- (Turkey) Yasemen Saylar
- Coach: (Turkey) Ekrem Memnun

=== 2013–14 ===
Roster

- (Spain) Alba Torrens
- (Turkey) Ayşe Cora
- (Turkey) Ayşegül Günay
- (Turkey) Bahar Çağlar
- (Turkey) Işıl Alben
- (Turkey) İnci Güçlü
- (Turkey) Esra Şencebe
- (United States) Kelsey Bone
- (Montenegro) Nataša Popović
- (Turkey) Nevriye Yılmaz
- (Turkey) Özge Yavaş
- (Saint Vincent and the Grenadines) (Spain) Sancho Lyttle
- (Turkey) Seda Deniz
- (United States) Shavonte Zellous
- (Turkey) Şebnem Kimyacıoğlu
- (Ivory Coast) (Spain) Vanessa Blé
- (Turkey) Yasemen Saylar
- Coach: (Turkey) Ekrem Memnun

=== 2014–15 ===
Roster

- (Spain) Alba Torrens
- (Turkey) Ayşe Cora
- (Turkey) Ayşegül Günay
- (Turkey) Bahar Çağlar
- (Turkey) Bahar Öztürk
- (Turkey) Deniz Çolakoğlu
- (Turkey) İnci Güçlü
- (Turkey) İrem Naz Topuz
- (Serbia and Montenegro) Jelena Dubljević
- (United States) Kelsey Bone
- (United States) Kristi Bellock
- (Turkey) Nevriye Yılmaz
- (Spain) Nuria Martínez
- (Spain) Queralt Casas
- (Saint Vincent and the Grenadines) (Spain) Sancho Lyttle
- (Turkey) Şebnem Kimyacıoğlu
- (Turkey) Seda Deniz
- Coach: (Turkey) Ekrem Memnun

=== 2015–16 ===
Roster

- (Belgium) Ann Wauters
- (Turkey) Ayşegül Günay
- (Turkey) Bahar Çağlar
- (Turkey) Cansu Köksal
- (Turkey) Deniz Çolakoğlu
- (Turkey) Elzem Arat
- (Turkey) Işıl Alben
- (Turkey) İnci Güçlü
- (Turkey) İrem Naz Topuz
- (Serbia and Montenegro) Jelena Dubljević
- (United States) Jewell Loyd
- (United States) Lynetta Kizer
- (Turkey) Meltem Yıldızhan
- (United States) Nevriye Yılmaz
- (Spain) Nuria Martínez
- (Czech Republic) Petra Kulichová
- (Turkey) Seda Deniz
- Coach: (Serbia) Marina Maljković

=== 2016–17 ===
Roster

- (United States) Ashley Paris
- (Senegal) Astou Traoré
- (Turkey) Cansu Köksal
- (Turkey) Deniz Çolakoğlu
- (Turkey) Eda Şahin
- (Turkey) Elzem Arat
- (Turkey) Işıl Alben
- (Latvia) Kristīne Vītola
- (Belarus) Maryia Papova
- (Turkey) Meltem Yıldızhan
- (United States) Moriah Jefferson
- (Turkey) Pınar Gezici Demirok
- (Turkey) Seda Deniz
- (Portugal) Sofia Da Silva
- (Turkey) Yağmur Kübra Taşar
- (United States) Yvonne Anderson
- Coach: (Serbia) Marina Maljković

=== 2017–18 ===
Roster

- (United States) (Hungary) Allie Quigley
- (Turkey) Eda Şahin
- (Poland) Ewelina Kobryn
- (Lithuania) Gintarė Petronytė
- (Turkey) Gizem Başaran
- (Turkey) Işıl Alben
- (Turkey) İnci Güçlü
- (Turkey) İrem Naz Topuz
- (Serbia) Jelena Dubljević
- (United States) Kaela Davis
- (Turkey) Merve Uygul
- (Turkey) Meltem Yıldızhan
- (France) Olivia Époupa
- (Turkey) Özge Kavurmacıoğlu
- (Turkey) Tuğba Taşcı
- (Turkey) Yağmur Kübra Taşar
- Coach: (Serbia) Marina Maljković

=== 2018–19 ===
Roster

- (Turkey) Eda Şahin
- (Sweden) (Somalia) Farhiya Abdi
- (Turkey) Işıl Alben
- (Turkey) İnci Güçlü
- (Turkey) Meltem Yıldızhan
- (Turkey) Mısra Albayrak
- (Turkey) Miray Balotu
- (Lithuania) Monika Grigalauskytė
- (United States) Moriah Jefferson
- (Turkey) Sinem Ataş
- (Turkey) Alperi Onar
- (United States) (Nigeria) Victoria Macaulay
- Coach: (Turkey) Efe Güven

=== 2019–20 ===
Roster

- (United States) Bria Hartley
- (Romania) Claudia Monica Cuic
- (Serbia) Dragana Stanković
- (Turkey) Eda Şahin
- (Turkey) Funda Nakkaşoğlu
- (Turkey) Işıl Alben
- (Turkey) İnci Güçlü
- (Turkey) Meltem Yıldızhan
- (Turkey) Mısra Albayrak
- (Turkey) Miray Balotu
- (Turkey) Sinem Ataş
- (Turkey) Sude Yılmaz
- (Turkey) Alperi Onar
- (Turkey) Tilbe Şenyürek
- (United States) Victoria Macaulay
- Coach: (Turkey) Efe Güven

== 2020 Era ==
=== 2020–21 ===
Roster

- (Turkey) Asena Yalçın
- (Turkey) Cansu Köksal
- (Turkey) Eda Şahin
- (Turkey) Melisa Eroğlu
- (Turkey) Meltem Yıldızhan
- (Turkey) Mısra Albayrak
- (Turkey) Miray Balotu
- (Turkey) Pelin Derya Bilgiç
- (Turkey) Sude Yılmaz
- (Turkey) Simge Tokmak
- (United States) Angel McCoughtry
- (United States) Bella Alarie
- (United States) Bria Hartley
- (United States) Courtney Williams
- (United States) Mercedes Russell
- (United States) (Turkey) Quanitra Hollingsworth
- (Latvia) Anete Šteinberga
- (Russia) (United States) Epiphanny Prince
- (Slovakia) Žofia Hruščáková
- Head coach: (Turkey) Efe Güven

=== 2021–22 ===
Roster

- (Turkey) Arifecan Vardar
- (Turkey) Berna Şahin
- (Turkey) Eda Şahin
- (Turkey) Gizem Başaran
- (Turkey) Gizem Yavuz
- (Turkey) Melis Gülcan
- (Turkey) Merve Aydın
- (Turkey) Mısra Albayrak
- (Turkey) Miray Balotu
- (Turkey) Pelin Bilgiç
- (Turkey) Simge Tokmak
- (Turkey) Sude Yılmaz
- (Latvia) Anete Šteinberga
- (United States) Chelsea Dungee
- (United States) Kaela Davis
- (United States) Kelsey Plum
- (United States) Riquna Williams
- (United States) Shante Evans
- (Serbia) Tina Krajišnik
- Head coach: (Turkey) Efe Güven

=== 2022–23 ===
Honors

- (European Union) EuroCup Women Runner-Up

Roster

- (Turkey) Devran Tanaçan
- (Turkey) Işıl Alben (C)
- (Turkey) Meltem Yıldızhan
- (Turkey) Merve Uygül
- (Turkey) Miray Balotu
- (Turkey) Pelin Bilgiç
- (Turkey) Simge Tokmak
- (Turkey) Sude Yılmaz
- (Turkey) Tuğçe Canıtez
- (Lithuania) Kamilė Nacickaitė
- (Latvia) Aija Jurjāne
- (Latvia) Ieva Pulvere
- (United States) Alaina Coates
- (United States) Azurá Stevens
- (United States) (Russia) Epiphanny Prince
- (United States) (Turkey) Teaira McCowan
- Head coach: (Turkey) Alper Durur

=== 2023–24 ===
Roster

- (Turkey) Arifecan Vardar
- (Turkey) Berna Şahin
- (Turkey) Büşra Akbaş
- (Turkey) Harika Eldaş
- (Turkey) İnci Güçlü
- (Turkey) Gizem Yavuz
- (Turkey) Meltem Yıldızhan (C)
- (Turkey) Sude Yılmaz
- (Turkey) Yağmur Kübra Taşar
- (United States) (Turkey) Teaira McCowan
- (United States) (France) Bria Hartley
- (United States) Myisha Hines-Allen
- (United States) NaLyssa Smith
- (United States) Tiffany Mitchell
- (United Kingdom) Mikiah Herbert Harrigan
- (Belgium) Julie Vanloo
- (Belgium) Hind Ben Abdelkader
- Head coach: (Turkey) Alper Durur (until 9 October 2023)
- Head coach: (Serbia) Miloš Pađen (9 October 2023 – 16 February 2024)
- Head coach: (Turkey) Tolga Esenci (from 18 February 2024)

=== 2024–25 ===
Roster

- (Turkey) Arifecan Vardar
- (Turkey) Ayşe Cora (C)
- (Turkey) Ayşegül Günay
- (Turkey) Berna Şahin
- (Turkey) Derin Erdoğan
- (Turkey) Gökşen Fitik
- (Turkey) Meltem Yıldızhan
- (Turkey) Selin Rachel Gül
- (Turkey) Simge Tokmak
- (Turkey) Sude Yılmaz
- (United States) (Azerbaijan) Brianna Ashaki Fraser
- (United States) (Turkey) Quanitra Hollingsworth
- (South Korea) Park Ji-su
- (Latvia) Anete Šteinberga
- (Italy) Cecilia Zandalasini
- (China) Li Yueru
- (Belgium) Julie Vanloo
- Head coach: (Turkey) Ekrem Memnun

=== 2025–26 ===
Honors

- (Turkey) Turkish Women's Basketball Cup Runner-Up

Roster

- (Turkey) Ayşe Cora (C)
- (Turkey) Berna Şahin
- (Turkey) Derin Erdoğan
- (Turkey) Elif Bayram
- (Turkey) Gökşen Fitik
- (Turkey) Sehernaz Çidal
- (Turkey) Sude Yılmaz
- (Turkey) Zeynep Şevval Gül
- (Finland) Awak Kuier
- (Hungary) Dorka Juhász
- (United States) (Nigeria) Elizabeth Williams
- (United States) (Bosnia and Herzegovina) Kamiah Smalls
- (France) Marine Johannès
- (Slovenia) Teja Oblak
- Head coach: (Turkey) Ekrem Memnun (until 14 November 2025)
- Head coach: (Turkey) Hasan Fırat Okul (from 22 November 2025)

== See also ==
- Galatasaray S.K. men's basketball team rosters
- Galatasaray S.K. wheelchair basketball team rosters
