= 2023–24 Galatasaray S.K. (women's basketball) season =

Turkish basketball team season

Galatasaray Çağdaş Faktoring
2023–24 season
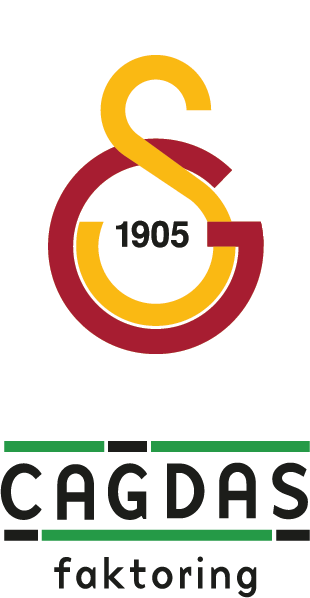
- President: (Turkey) Dursun Özbek
- Head coach: (Turkey) Alper Durur (until 9 October 2023) (Serbia) Miloš Pađen (9 October 2023 – 16 February 2024) (Turkey) Tolga Esenci (from 18 February 2024)
- Arena: Ahmet Cömert Sport Hall
- Women's Basketball Super League: 5th seed
- Playoffs: Semifinals
- EuroCup Women: Quarterfinals
- Turkish Women's Basketball Cup: Quarterfinals

The 2023–24 season is Galatasaray's 69th season in the existence of the club. The team plays in the Women's Basketball Super League and in the EuroCup Women.

== Overview ==
=== July ===
On 17 July, a new 1+1 year contract was signed with Head Coach Alper Durur.

On 18 July, Işıl Alben was appointed as the General Coordinator.

=== August ===
On 1 August, Galatasaray carried out the first training of the 2023–24 season with the participation of the local players.

On 22 August, Galatasaray Çağdaş Faktoring's pre-season preparation program has been announced.

On 23 August, The Fixture of the 2023–24 season in the Women's Basketball Super League has been announced.

=== October ===
On 9 October, It has been announced that the head coach and Alper Durur have parted ways.

On 9 October, Miloš Pađen was appointed as head coach.

=== December ===
The schedule of the matches to be played in the quarter-finals of the Turkish Women's Basketball Cup Cup 2023–24 season was announced on 20 December 2023.

=== February ===
On 16 February 2024, Galatasaray announced that they had parted ways with Head Coach Miloš Pađen by mutual agreement.

In the statement made on 19 February 2024, it was reported that Tolga Esenci, who has been an assistant coach since the beginning of the season, will serve as head coach for the remainder of the season.

== Players ==
=== Current roster ===
Galatasaray roster
Players
Coaches

Pos.	No.	Nat.	Name	Ht.	Wt.	Age
PF	1	(United States)	Smith, NaLyssa	1.93 m (6 ft 4 in)	84 kg (185 lb)	25 – 8 August 2000
SG	3	(Turkey)	Taşar, Yağmur Kübra	1.73 m (5 ft 8 in)		26 – 24 December 1999
PG	4	(Turkey)	Akbaş, Büşra	1.74 m (5 ft 9 in)		31 – 8 March 1995
PG	7	(Turkey)	Şahin, Berna	1.70 m (5 ft 7 in)		23 – 21 January 2003
SF	8	(Turkey)	Yılmaz, Sude	1.82 m (6 ft 0 in)		24 – 15 March 2002
C	11	(Turkey)	Güçlü, İnci	2.05 m (6 ft 9 in)	87 kg (192 lb)	27 – 26 February 1999
SF	14	(Turkey)	Vardar, Arifecan	1.84 m (6 ft 0 in)		23 – 13 January 2003
C	15	(United States) (Turkey)	McCowan, Teaira	2.01 m (6 ft 7 in)	108 kg (238 lb)	29 – 28 September 1996
PG	17	(Turkey)	Yavuz, Gizem (injured)	1.70 m (5 ft 7 in)		38 – 10 March 1988
F	21	(United Kingdom)	Herbert Harrigan, Mikiah	1.88 m (6 ft 2 in)	69 kg (152 lb)	27 – 21 August 1998
F	23	(Turkey)	Yıldızhan, Meltem (C)	1.88 m (6 ft 2 in)	81 kg (179 lb)	26 – 5 August 1999
G	24	(Belgium)	Ben Abdelkader, Hind	1.73 m (5 ft 8 in)	67 kg (148 lb)	30 – 21 July 1995
SF	28	(Turkey)	Eldaş, Harika	1.83 m (6 ft 0 in)	82 kg (181 lb)	35 – 15 May 1990
SG	32	(United States) (France)	Hartley, Bria	1.73 m (5 ft 8 in)	67 kg (148 lb)	33 – 30 September 1992
PG	35	(Belgium)	Vanloo, Julie	1.72 m (5 ft 8 in)		33 – 10 February 1993

Head coach

- (Turkey) Tolga Esenci

Assistant coach(es)

- (Turkey) Selim Aldağ
- (Turkey) Batuhan Akkaya

Athletic trainer(s)

- (Turkey) Serkan Bodur

Legend

- (C) Team captain
- (DC) Dual citizenship
- Injured

- Roster
Updated: 28 February 2024

=== Depth chart ===
Pos.	Starting 5	Bench 1	Bench 2	Bench 3	Inactive
C	Teaira McCowan	İnci Güçlü
PF	NaLyssa Smith	Mikiah Herbert Harrigan
SF	Meltem Yıldızhan	Sude Yılmaz	Harika Eldaş	Arifecan Vardar
SG	Bria Hartley	Hind Ben Abdelkader	Yağmur Kübra Taşar
PG	Julie Vanloo	Büşra Akbaş		Berna Şahin	Gizem Yavuz (injured)

(colours: Turkish or homegrown players; foreign players)

=== Transactions ===
==== Players In ====
No.	Pos.	Nat.	Name	Age	Moving from		Type	Ends	Transfer fee	Date	Source
25	SG	(United States)	Tiffany Mitchell	28	Melbourne Boomers	(Australia)	1 years	June 2024	Free	19 July 2023	
24	G	(Belgium)	Hind Ben Abdelkader	28	ESB Villeneuve-d'Ascq	(France)	1 years	June 2024	Free	21 July 2023	
21	F	(United Kingdom)	Mikiah Herbert Harrigan	24	London Lions	(United Kingdom)	1 years	June 2024	Free	23 July 2023	
28	SF	(Turkey)	Harika Eldaş	33	Emlak Konut Spor Kulübü	(Turkey)	1 years	June 2024	Free	25 July 2023	
3	SG	(Turkey)	Yağmur Kübra Taşar	23	Beşiktaş	(Turkey)	1 years	June 2024	Free	27 July 2023	
17	PG	(Turkey)	Gizem Yavuz	35	Emlak Konut Spor Kulübü	(Turkey)	1 years	June 2024	Free	29 July 2023	
11	C	(Turkey)	İnci Güçlü	24	Beşiktaş	(Turkey)	1 years	June 2024	Free	3 August 2023	
1	PF	(United States)	NaLyssa Smith	23	Indiana Fever	(United States)	1 years	June 2024	Free	30 August 2023	
35	PG	(Belgium)	Julie Vanloo	30	BLMA	(France)	1 years	June 2024	Free	13 September 2023	
2	SF	(United States)	Myisha Hines-Allen	27	Virtus Bologna	(Italy)	1 years	June 2024	Free	25 September 2023	
32	SG	(United States) (France)	Bria Hartley	31	CB Avenida	(Spain)	6 months	June 2024	Free	21 December 2023	
15	C	(United States) (Turkey)	Teaira McCowan	27	Beijing Ducks	(China)	5 months	June 2024	Free	8 January 2024	

==== Players Out ====
No.	Pos.	Nat.	Name	Age	Moving to		Type	Transfer fee	Date	Source
10	PG	(Turkey)	Işıl Alben	37	Retired		End of contract	Free	3 June 2023	
9	SG	(Turkey)	Pelin Bilgiç	28	Nesibe Aydın GSK	(Turkey)	End of contract	Free	13 June 2023	
1	G/F	(Lithuania)	Kamilė Nacickaitė	33	Tango Bourges Basket	(France)	End of contract	Free	13 June 2023	
15	C	(United States) (Turkey)	Teaira McCowan	26	Dallas Wings	(United States)	End of contract	Free	20 June 2023	
5	PG	(United States) (Russia)	Epiphanny Prince	35			End of contract	Free	6 July 2023	
6	PF	(Turkey)	Miray Balotu	22	Bursa Uludağ Basketbol	(Turkey)	End of contract	Free	6 July 2023	
7	PG	(Turkey)	Merve Uygül	34	İlkem Yapı Tarsus Spor	(Turkey)	End of contract	Free	6 July 2023	
11	PF	(Latvia)	Aija Jurjāne	35	Retired		End of contract	Free	6 July 2023	
12	SG	(Latvia)	Ieva Pulvere	32	TTT Riga	(Latvia)	End of contract	Free	6 July 2023	
13	C	(Turkey)	Devran Tanaçan	36	Espérance Sportive Pully	(Switzerland)	End of contract	Free	6 July 2023	
30	F/C	(United States)	Azurá Stevens	27	Los Angeles Sparks	(United States)	End of contract	Free	6 July 2023	
72	F	(Turkey)	Tuğçe Canıtez	32	Retired		End of contract	Free	6 July 2023	
2	PF	(Turkey)	Simge Tokmak	20	Bodrum Basketbol	(Turkey)	Undisclosed	Undisclosed	September 2023	
25	SG	(United States)	Tiffany Mitchell	29	REG	(Rwanda)	Mutual agreement	Free	30 November 2023	
2	SF	(United States)	Myisha Hines-Allen	28			Contract termination	Free	28 February 2024	

==== Contract extension ====
No.	Pos.	Nat.	Name	Age	Cont.	Date	Source
23	F	(Turkey)	Meltem Yıldızhan	23	1	20 July 2023	
4	PG	(Turkey)	Büşra Akbaş	28	1	22 July 2023	

== Club ==
=== Technical Staff ===
As of 19 February 2024

Staff member	Position
Müge Erdem	General Manager
Işıl Alben	General Coordinator
Melahat Aydın	Team Manager
Tolga Esenci	Head Coach
Selim Aldağ	Assistant Coach
Batuhan Akkaya	Assistant Coach
Serkan Bodur	Conditioner
Altuğ Duramaz	Doctor
Pelin Yılmaz	Physiotherapist
Zerrin Hatacıkoğlu	Masseuse
Alaaddin Akkoyun	Material Manager
Özcan Kör	Transportation Manager

=== Staff changes ===
Change	Date	Staff member	Staff position	Ref.
Out	June 2023	(Turkey) Batuhan Atiktürk	Assistant Coach	
Out	July 2023	(Turkey) Süleyman Görgülü	Conditioner	
Out	July 2023	(Turkey) Can Alyüz	Assistant Coach	
Out	July 2023	(Turkey) Emre Beşer	Assistant Coach	
In	July 2023	(Turkey) Serkan Bodur	Conditioner	
In	August 2023	(Turkey) Tolga Esenci	Assistant Coach	
In	August 2023	(Turkey) Batuhan Akkaya	Assistant Coach	
In	August 2023	(Turkey) Selim Aldağ	Assistant Coach	
Out	9 October 2023	(Turkey) Alper Durur	Head Coach	
In	9 October 2023	(Serbia) Miloš Pađen	Head Coach	
Out	16 February 2024	(Serbia) Miloš Pađen	Head Coach	
In	19 February 2024	(Turkey) Tolga Esenci	Head Coach	

=== Uniform ===
Home	Away	Third

=== Sponsorship and kit manufacturers ===
- Supplier: Umbro
- Name sponsor: Çağdaş Faktoring
- Main sponsor: Tunç Holding
- Back sponsor: Çağdaş Faktoring
- Sleeve sponsor: —
- Lateral sponsor: —
- Short sponsor: HDI Sigorta
- Socks sponsor: —

== Pre-season and friendlies ==
=== Friendly match ===
24 August 2023 Friendly Match	Botaş	67–63	Galatasaray Çağdaş Faktoring	Ankara
17:00 TRT (UTC+3)
		Boxscore		Arena: BOTAŞ Spor Yapracık Tesisleri Spor Salonu

26 August 2023 Friendly Match	OGM Ormanspor	Cancelled	Galatasaray Çağdaş Faktoring	Ankara
14:00 TRT (UTC+3)
				Arena: M. Sait Zarifoğlu Spor Salonu

26 August 2023 Friendly Match	Nesibe Aydın	70–63	Galatasaray Çağdaş Faktoring	Ankara
14:00 TRT (UTC+3)
		Boxscore		Arena: TOBB ETÜ Spor Salonu

31 August 2023 Friendly Match	Galatasaray Çağdaş Faktoring	80–82	Mehmet Kavan Yapı İzmit Belediyespor	Istanbul
14:00 TRT (UTC+3)
		Boxscore		Arena: Florya Metin Oktay Facilities

2 September 2023 Friendly Match	Galatasaray Çağdaş Faktoring	60–76	Beşiktaş	Istanbul
14:00 TRT (UTC+3)
		Boxscore		Arena: Florya Metin Oktay Facilities

5 September 2023 Friendly Match	Emlak Konut Spor Kulübü	Cancelled	Galatasaray Çağdaş Faktoring	Istanbul
14:00 TRT (UTC+3)
				Arena: Başakşehir Spor Kompleksi

7 September 2023 Friendly Match	Beşiktaş	Cancelled	Galatasaray Çağdaş Faktoring	Istanbul
15:00 TRT (UTC+3)
				Arena: BJK Akatlar Arena

== Competitions ==
=== Overall ===
Competition	Started round	Final position / round	First match	Last match
Women's Basketball Super League	Round 1	5th	13 September 2023	20 March 2024
Women's Basketball Super League Playoffs	Quarterfinals	Semifinals	23 March 2024	2 April 2024
EuroCup Women	Round 1	Quarterfinals	11 October 2023	29 February 2024
Turkish Women's Basketball Cup	Quarterfinals	Quarterfinals	2 January 2024	2 January 2024

Updated to match played 3 April 2024
Source: Competitions

=== Overview ===
Competition	Record							
Competition	Pld	W	D	L	PF	PA	PD	Win %
Women's Basketball Super League	28	18	0	10	2,407	2,289	+118	64.29
Women's Basketball Super League Playoffs	5	2	0	3	388	426	−38	40.00
EuroCup Women	12	8	1	3	998	887	+111	66.67
Turkish Women's Basketball Cup	1	0	0	1	65	76	−11	0.00
Total	46	28	1	17	3,858	3,678	+180	60.87

Last updated: 3 April 2024
Source: Competitions

=== Women's Basketball Super League ===
==== Regular season ====
Pos	Team	Pld	W	L	GF	GA	GD	Pts	Qualification or relegation
1	Fenerbahçe Alagöz Holding	28	28	0	2621	1856	+765	56	Qualification to playoffs
2	Beşiktaş	28	20	8	2389	2096	+293	48	Qualification to playoffs
3	OGM Ormanspor	28	19	9	2250	2154	+96	47	Qualification to playoffs
4	Mehmet Kavan Yapı İzmit Belediyespor	28	19	9	2326	2167	+159	47	Qualification to playoffs
5	Galatasaray Çağdaş Faktoring	28	18	10	2407	2289	+118	46	Qualification to playoffs
6	ÇBK Mersin (Note: ÇBK Mersin won the ÇBK Mersin – Fenerbahçe Alagöz Holding match played on 13.09.2023, 76-74. However, by the Turkish Basketball Federation, ÇBK Mersin team was declared defeated by default on the grounds that the esame list violated the Basketball Competition Instructions and 1 point was deleted.)	28	17	11	2263	1998	+265	45	Qualification to playoffs
7	Nesibe Aydın	28	15	13	2248	2116	+132	43	Qualification to playoffs
8	Botaş	28	14	14	2122	2109	+13	42	Qualification to playoffs
9	Melikgazi Kayseri Basketbol	28	12	16	2352	2314	+38	40	
10	Emlak Konut Spor Kulübü	28	11	17	2091	2225	−134	39	
11	Antalya Büyükşehir Belediyespor Toroslar Basketbol	28	10	18	2220	2435	−215	38	
12	İlkem Yapı Tarsus Spor	28	9	19	2120	2248	−128	37	
13	Bursa Uludağ Basketbol (Note: In the İlkem Yapı Tarsus Spor match played in the 28th week, he was declared defeated by default and 1 point was deducted on the grounds that he violated the Basketball Competition Instructions.)	28	10	18	2076	2252	−176	38	Relegation to TKBL
14	Çankaya Üniversitesi	28	8	20	2315	2602	−287	36	Relegation to TKBL
15	Hatay Büyükşehir Belediyespor	28	0	28	2023	2962	−939	28	Relegation to TKBL

Source: Turkish Basketball Federation

==== Results summary ====
Overall						Home					Away				
Pld	W	L	PF	PA	PD	W	L	PF	PA	PD	W	L	PF	PA	PD
28	18	10	2407	2289	+118	8	6	1167	1104	+63	10	4	1240	1185	+55

Last updated: 20 March 2024.
Source: TBF.org.tr

==== Results by round ====
Round	1	2	3	4	5	6	7	8	9	10	11	12	13	14	15	16	17	18	19	20	21	22	23	24	25	26	27	28	29	30
Ground	H	A	H	A	H	A	H	A	H	A	H	A	B	A	H	A	H	A	H	A	H	A	H	A	H	A	H	B	H	A
Result	W	L	L	W	L	W	W	W	L	W	W	W	B	W	L	W	L	L	W	W	W	W	W	L	W	L	W	B	L	W
Position	4	10	8	7	9	6	5	3	6	5	5	4	5	5	5	4	6	6	6	6	4	3	3	4	4	3	3	5	5	5

Updated to match(es) played on 20 March 2024. Source: TBF.org.tr
A = Away; H = Home; B = Bye; W = Win; L = Loss

==== Matches ====
Note: All times are TRT (UTC+3) as listed by the Turkish Basketball Federation.

13 September 2023 1	Galatasaray Çağdaş Faktoring	56–46	Emlak Konut Spor Kulübü	Bahçelievler, Istanbul, Turkey
20:00 TRT (UTC+3)	Scoring by quarter: 22–14, 12–7, 12–17, 10–8
TBF TV - YouTube	Pts: Akbaş 12; Rebs: Yıldızhan 13; Asts: Vanloo 5 PIR: Akbaş 16	Boxscore; Report	Pts: Horvat 15; Rebs: Başaran 11; Asts: Sertoğlu, Wiese 3 PIR: Horvat 15	Arena: Şehit Mustafa Özel Spor Kompleksi; Referees: Ali Şakacı, Fatma Öztürk, Kadir Giray Esen

17 September 2023 2	Fenerbahçe Alagöz Holding	84–56	Galatasaray Çağdaş Faktoring	Istanbul, Turkey
14:00 TRT (UTC+3)	Scoring by quarter: 22–13, 16–10, 24–19, 22–14
TBF TV - YouTube	Pts: Meesseman 25; Rebs: Meesseman 13; Asts: Anderson, Onar 6 PIR: Meesseman 34	Boxscore; Report	Pts: Yıldızhan 17; Rebs: Ben Abdelkader 8 Asts: Ben Abdelkader 4 PIR: Yıldızhan 14	Arena: Fenerbahçe Metro Enerji Spor Salonu; Referees: Ali Serkan Emlek, Alper Gökçebel, Seda Esen

24 September 2023 3	Galatasaray Çağdaş Faktoring	61–73	Mehmet Kavan Yapı İzmit Belediyespor	Ataköy, Bakırköy, Istanbul, Turkey
15:30 TRT (UTC+3)	Scoring by quarter: 18–23, 13–21, 5–17, 25–12
TBF TV - YouTube	Pts: Harrigan, Ben Abdelkader 21; Rebs: Harrigan 10; Asts: Vanloo 5 PIR: Harrigan 22	Boxscore; Report	Pts: Nared 18; Rebs: Hillsman 12; Asts: Özışık 7 PIR: Calhoun 24	Arena: Ahmet Cömert Sport Hall; Referees: Orhan Çağrı Hekimoğlu, Hakan Gerey, Metin Erol

30 September 2023 4	Hatay Büyükşehir Belediyespor	74–91	Galatasaray Çağdaş Faktoring	Hatay, Turkey
14:00 TRT (UTC+3)	Scoring by quarter: 26–21, 13–25, 17–19, 18–26
TBF TV - YouTube	Pts: Tolefree 32; Rebs: Davis 13; Asts: Tolefree 5 PIR: Tolefree 23	Boxscore; Report	Pts: Harrigan 31; Rebs: Harrigan 12; Asts: Vanloo 9 PIR: Harrigan 45	Arena: Hatay Merkez Spor Salonu; Referees: Fatih Güler, Almina Kocabaş, Mustafa Çeltiker

7 October 2023 5	Galatasaray Çağdaş Faktoring	88–90(OT)	Botaş	Ataköy, Bakırköy, Istanbul, Turkey
15:00 TRT (UTC+3)	Scoring by quarter: 20–15, 22–25, 22–21, 15–18, Overtime: 9–11
TBF TV - YouTube	Pts: Hines-Allen 24; Rebs: Hines-Allen 16; Asts: Akbaş, Vanloo 8 PIR: Hines-Allen 32	Boxscore; Report	Pts: Holmes 21; Rebs: Holmes 19; Asts: Mandıracı 8 PIR: Holmes 31	Arena: Ahmet Cömert Sport Hall; Referees: Alper Altuğ Köselerli, Metehan Alaçam, Atakan Kaymak

15 October 2023 6	Bursa Uludağ Basketbol	78–103	Galatasaray Çağdaş Faktoring	Bursa, Turkey
14:00 TRT (UTC+3)	Scoring by quarter: 14–24, 27–30, 20–23, 17–26
TBF TV - YouTube	Pts: Baptiste 25; Rebs: Baptiste 12; Asts: Williams 7 PIR: Baptiste 30	Boxscore; Report	Pts: Hines-Allen 22; Rebs: Hines-Allen 14; Asts: Vanloo 8 PIR: Hines-Allen 34	Arena: Tofaş Nilüfer Spor Salonu; Referees: Kaan Büyükçil, Ahmet Murat Arıkanlı, Nagehan Şeyda Kurden Aktaş

22 October 2023 7	Galatasaray Çağdaş Faktoring	80–69	Nesibe Aydın	Ataköy, Bakırköy, Istanbul, Turkey
15:30 TRT (UTC+3)	Scoring by quarter: 25–16, 22–20, 15–18, 18–15
TBF TV - YouTube	Pts: Hines-Allen 26; Rebs: Hines-Allen 14; Asts: Vanloo 13; PIR: Hines-Allen 36	Boxscore; Report	Pts: Cannon 24; Rebs: Cannon 11; Asts: Bilgiç 10; PIR: Cannon 19	Arena: Ahmet Cömert Sport Hall; Referees: Burak Yılmaz, Sertan Kırklar, Nihat Çetin

29 October 2023 8	İlkem Yapı Tarsus Spor	77–100	Galatasaray Çağdaş Faktoring	Mersin, Turkey
14:00 TRT (UTC+3)	Scoring by quarter: 8–25, 26–21, 24–28, 19–26
TBF TV - YouTube	Pts: Cave 32; Rebs: Cave 12; Asts: Uygül 5 PIR: Cave 39	Boxscore; Report	Pts: Ben Abdelkader 24; Rebs: Harrigan 12; Asts: Vanloo 8 PIR: Ben Abdelkader 33	Arena: Servet Tazegül Arena; Referees: Batuhan Söylemezoğlu, Almina Kocabaş, Ramazan Sezer Baran

4 November 2023 9	Galatasaray Çağdaş Faktoring	61–103	Beşiktaş	Ataköy, Bakırköy, Istanbul, Turkey
16:30 TRT (UTC+3)	Scoring by quarter: 17–29, 16–22, 13–27, 15–25
TBF TV - YouTube	Pts: Vanloo 20; Rebs: Harrigan 7 Asts: Vanloo 5 PIR: Vanloo 17	Boxscore; Report	Pts: Evans 29; Rebs: Bayram 17; Asts: Evans 9 PIR: Evans 35	Arena: Ahmet Cömert Sport Hall; Referees: Kerem Baki, Mesut Öztürk, Burak Erkan

16 November 2023 10	Antalya Büyükşehir Belediyespor Toroslar Basketbol	75–87	Galatasaray Çağdaş Faktoring	Antalya, Turkey
14:00 TRT (UTC+3)	Scoring by quarter: 23–19, 20–24, 16–21, 16–23
TBF TV - YouTube	Pts: Henderson 22; Rebs: Kavurmacıoğlu 15; Asts: Henderson 7 PIR: Henderson 17	Boxscore; Report	Pts: Ben Abdelkader 24; Rebs: Smith 16; Asts: Akbaş 7 PIR: Hines-Allen 22	Arena: Antalya Spor Salonu; Referees: Murat Ciner, Ali Osman Kanık, Nagehan Şeyda Kurden Aktaş

19 November 2023 11	Galatasaray Çağdaş Faktoring	89–85	Melikgazi Kayseri Basketbol	Istanbul, Turkey
15:00 TRT (UTC+3)	Scoring by quarter: 19–26, 18–20, 24–16, 28–23
TBF TV - YouTube	Pts: Hines-Allen 30; Rebs: Smith 11; Asts: Vanloo 12; PIR: Hines-Allen 29	Boxscore; Report	Pts: Ellenberg-Wiley 23; Rebs: Holmes 11; Asts: Günay 7 PIR: Günay 26	Arena: Şehit Mustafa Özel Spor Kompleksi; Referees: Seher Ayşe Nur Yazıcıoğlu, Sezer Bor, Mustafa Çeltiker

26 November 2023 12	Çankaya Üniversitesi	78–86	Galatasaray Çağdaş Faktoring	Ankara, Turkey
16:00 TRT (UTC+3)	Scoring by quarter: 10–15, 18–23, 24–20, 26–28
TBF TV - YouTube	Pts: Pierre-Louis 32; Rebs: Yalçınkaya 11; Asts: Walker-Kimbrough, Fontaine 7 PIR: Pierre-Louis 28	Boxscore; Report	Pts: Ben Abdelkader, Vanloo 23; Rebs: Smith 12; Asts: Vanloo 8 PIR: Ben Abdelkader 26	Arena: Ankara Arena; Referees: Zafer Yılmaz, Benhür İrcel, Selena Gamze Öget Çerçi

13	Bye

10 December 2023 14	OGM Ormanspor	89–95	Galatasaray Çağdaş Faktoring	Ankara, Turkey
14:00 TRT (UTC+3)	Scoring by quarter: 18–15, 28–29, 27–24, 16–27
TBF TV - YouTube	Pts: Sutton 25; Rebs: Ural 11; Asts: Fitik 7 PIR: Sutton 25	Boxscore; Report	Pts: Hines-Allen, Harrigan 19; Rebs: Hines-Allen 10; Asts: Vanloo 11; PIR: Hines-Allen 25	Arena: M. Sait Zarifoğlu Spor Salonu; Referees: Hüseyin Çelik, Mustafa Candemir Tabak, Metin Erol

17 December 2023 15	Galatasaray Çağdaş Faktoring	74–83	ÇBK Mersin	Ataköy, Bakırköy, Istanbul, Turkey
17:30 TRT (UTC+3)	Scoring by quarter: 16–24, 17–20, 22–23, 19–16
TBF TV - YouTube	Pts: Hines-Allen 22; Rebs: Hines-Allen 11; Asts: Vanloo 5 PIR: Hines-Allen 21	Boxscore; Report	Pts: Mabrey 27; Rebs: Williams 11; Asts: Iagupova 9 PIR: Mabrey 26	Arena: Ahmet Cömert Sport Hall; Referees: Yener Yılmaz, Cemil Uygül, Barış Burak Durmuş

23 December 2023 16	Emlak Konut Spor Kulübü	85–93	Galatasaray Çağdaş Faktoring	Bahçelievler, Istanbul, Turkey
17:00 TRT (UTC+3)	Scoring by quarter: 20–28, 19–16, 21–26, 25–23
TBF TV - YouTube	Pts: Smith 25; Rebs: Smith 8 Asts: Wiese 7 PIR: Smith 25	Boxscore; Report	Pts: Smith 27; Rebs: Hines-Allen 13; Asts: Vanloo 14; PIR: Hines-Allen 38	Arena: Şehit Mustafa Özel Spor Kompleksi; Referees: Alper Altuğ Köselerli, Ahmet Murat Arıkanlı, Hasan Ok

27 December 2023 17	Galatasaray Çağdaş Faktoring	83–103	Fenerbahçe Alagöz Holding	Ataköy, Bakırköy, Istanbul, Turkey
20:00 TRT (UTC+3)	Scoring by quarter: 16–24, 22–20, 17–31, 28–28
TBF TV - YouTube	Pts: Hines-Allen 23; Rebs: Smith 10; Asts: Hines-Allen 8 PIR: Hines-Allen 26	Boxscore; Report	Pts: McBride 30; Rebs: Howard 11; Asts: Uzun 9 PIR: McBride 34	Arena: Ahmet Cömert Sport Hall; Referees: Kerem Baki, Yücel Çilingir, Fatma Öztürk

30 December 2023 18	Mehmet Kavan Yapı İzmit Belediyespor	93–79	Galatasaray Çağdaş Faktoring	İzmit, Kocaeli, Turkey
16:00 TRT (UTC+3)	Scoring by quarter: 23–24, 24–19, 27–20, 19–16
TBF TV - YouTube	Pts: Cora 28; Rebs: Nared 11; Asts: Nared 7 PIR: Cora 30	Boxscore; Report	Pts: Hartley 22; Rebs: Smith 15; Asts: Vanloo 8 PIR: Smith 23	Arena: Şehit Polis Recep Topaloğlu Spor Salonu; Referees: Murat Ciner, Hüseyin Çamcı, Batuhan Mert Gül

7 January 2024 19	Galatasaray Çağdaş Faktoring	122–56	Hatay Büyükşehir Belediyespor	Ataköy, Bakırköy, Istanbul, Turkey
16:00 TRT (UTC+3)	Scoring by quarter: 33–11, 24–19, 38–12, 27–14
TBF TV - YouTube	Pts: Güçlü 21; Rebs: three players 6 Asts: Akbaş 11; PIR: Güçlü 27	Boxscore; Report	Pts: Taşkın 17; Rebs: Demir 7 Asts: Tutsak, Taşkın 3 PIR: Taşkın, Demir 17	Arena: Ahmet Cömert Sport Hall; Referees: Burak Yılmaz, Sabri Gündüz, Mustafa Gürhan Soysal

14 January 2024 20	Botaş	77–82	Galatasaray Çağdaş Faktoring	Altındağ, Ankara, Turkey
14:00 TRT (UTC+3)	Scoring by quarter: 15–21, 13–21, 26–17, 23–23
TBF TV - YouTube	Pts: Weaver 24; Rebs: Mack 22; Asts: Allen 6 PIR: Mack 28	Boxscore; Report	Pts: Vanloo 22; Rebs: Hines-Allen 21; Asts: Vanloo 13; PIR: Hines-Allen 31	Arena: Ankara Arena; Referees: Mehmet Serdar Ünal, Ramazan Sezer Baran, Sait Nedim Çelik

21 January 2024 21	Galatasaray Çağdaş Faktoring	74–62	Bursa Uludağ Basketbol	Ataköy, Bakırköy, Istanbul, Turkey
15:30 TRT (UTC+3)	Scoring by quarter: 17–18, 15–16, 28–16, 14–12
TBF TV - YouTube	Pts: Smith 21; Rebs: Hines-Allen 11; Asts: Vanloo 11; PIR: Smith 22	Boxscore; Report	Pts: Baptiste 15; Rebs: Poyraz 15; Asts: Williams, Şahin 4 PIR: Poyraz 22	Arena: Ahmet Cömert Sport Hall; Referees: Umut Özgün Ergün, Almina Kocabaş, Sezer Bor

27 January 2024 22	Nesibe Aydın	78–83	Galatasaray Çağdaş Faktoring	Ankara, Turkey
16:00 TRT (UTC+3)	Scoring by quarter: 13–22, 20–16, 19–25, 26–20
TBF TV - YouTube	Pts: Thomas 23; Rebs: Coates 8 Asts: Bilgiç, Thomas 6 PIR: Coates 28	Boxscore; Report	Pts: McCowan 18; Rebs: McCowan 11; Asts: Vanloo, Hines-Allen 6 PIR: McCowan 25	Arena: TOBB ETÜ Spor Salonu; Referees: Duhan Köyiçi, Barış Turgut, Mustafa Çeltiker

2 February 2024 23	Galatasaray Çağdaş Faktoring	90–87	İlkem Yapı Tarsus Spor	Ataköy, Bakırköy, Istanbul, Turkey
14:00 TRT (UTC+3)	Scoring by quarter: 25–28, 26–15, 14–22, 25–22
TBF TV - YouTube	Pts: McCowan 19; Rebs: McCowan 12; Asts: Vanloo 14; PIR: McCowan 29	Boxscore; Report	Pts: Robinson 31; Rebs: Davis 19; Asts: Robinson 9 PIR: Cave 26	Arena: Ahmet Cömert Sport Hall; Referees: Alper Özgök, Barış Burak Durmuş, Gündoğan Ali Balaban

15 February 2024 24	Beşiktaş	104–89	Galatasaray Çağdaş Faktoring	Istanbul, Turkey
20:00 TRT (UTC+3)	Scoring by quarter: 35–26, 31–27, 20–19, 18–17
TBF TV - YouTube	Pts: Yueru 29; Rebs: Bayram, Yueru 9 Asts: Evans, Yueru 6 PIR: Yueru 45	Boxscore; Report	Pts: McCowan 25; Rebs: McCowan 8 Asts: Akbaş, Vanloo 8 PIR: McCowan 31	Arena: BJK Akatlar Arena; Referees: Murat Ciner, Seda Esen, Burak Pehlivan

18 February 2024 25	Galatasaray Çağdaş Faktoring	99–70	Antalya Büyükşehir Belediyespor Toroslar Basketbol	Ataköy, Bakırköy, Istanbul, Turkey
15:00 TRT (UTC+3)	Scoring by quarter: 33–16, 21–12, 24–24, 21–18
TBF TV - YouTube	Pts: Smith 21; Rebs: Smith 15; Asts: Vanloo 14; PIR: Smith 31	Boxscore; Report	Pts: Bone 19; Rebs: Brown 7 Asts: Bone 4 PIR: Brown 16	Arena: Ahmet Cömert Sport Hall; Referees: Mesut Öztürk, Özkan Talo, Çağatay Taşkın

25 February 2024 26	Melikgazi Kayseri Basketbol	105–97	Galatasaray Çağdaş Faktoring	Kayseri, Turkey
16:00 TRT (UTC+3)	Scoring by quarter: 28–21, 30–21, 23–22, 24–33
TBF TV - YouTube	Pts: Hamby, Ellenberg-Wiley 34; Rebs: Hamby 15; Asts: Günay 11; PIR: Hamby 41	Boxscore; Report	Pts: Smith 33; Rebs: Smith 11; Asts: Vanloo 11; PIR: Smith 36	Arena: Kadir Has Spor Salonu; Referees: Ali Şakacı, Haldun Çoban, Sait Nedim Çelik

3 March 2024 27	Galatasaray Çağdaş Faktoring	113–99	Çankaya Üniversitesi	Ataköy, Bakırköy, Istanbul, Turkey
15:00 TRT (UTC+3)	Scoring by quarter: 27–27, 28–28, 28–20, 30–24
TBF TV - YouTube	Pts: Smith 44; Rebs: McCowan 15; Asts: Vanloo 11; PIR: McCowan 51	Boxscore; Report	Pts: McCarty-Williams 30; Rebs: Fontaine, Yalçınkaya 6 Asts: McCarty-Williams 9 PIR: McCarty-Williams 30	Arena: Ahmet Cömert Sport Hall; Referees: Fatih Güler, Sabri Gündüz, Ali Osman Kanık

28	Bye

16 March 2024 29	Galatasaray Çağdaş Faktoring	77–78	OGM Ormanspor	Ataköy, Bakırköy, Istanbul, Turkey
15:00 TRT (UTC+3)	Scoring by quarter: 23–17, 22–27, 13–18, 19–16
TBF TV - YouTube	Pts: McCowan 24; Rebs: McCowan 14; Asts: Vanloo 10; PIR: McCowan 31	Boxscore; Report	Pts: Sutton 23; Rebs: Ural 9 Asts: Sutton 9 PIR: Sutton 24	Arena: Ahmet Cömert Sport Hall; Referees: Ziya Özorhon, Sertan Kırklar, Özkan Çağlayan

20 March 2024 30	ÇBK Mersin	88–99	Galatasaray Çağdaş Faktoring	Mersin, Turkey
18:00 TRT (UTC+3)	Scoring by quarter: 19–22, 28–31, 21–15, 20–31
TBF TV - YouTube	Pts: Ataş 34; Rebs: Ataş 10; Asts: Cornelius 9 PIR: Ataş 26	Boxscore; Report	Pts: McCowan 19; Rebs: Harrigan 10; Asts: Vanloo 19; PIR: Vanloo 34	Arena: Servet Tazegül Arena; Referees: Murat Ciner, Ozan Gönen, Metehan Alaçam

==== Playoffs ====
===== Quarterfinals =====
Win Loss

23 March 2024 1	Mehmet Kavan Yapı İzmit Belediyespor	64–90 (Series: 0–1)	Galatasaray Çağdaş Faktoring	Kocaeli, Turkey
17:30 TRT (UTC+3)	Scoring by quarter: 19–18, 13–29, 19–24, 13–19
TBF TV - YouTube	Pts: Hillsman 26; Rebs: Hillsman, Nared 7 Asts: Cora 6 PIR: Hillsman 26	Boxscore; Report	Pts: Smith 25; Rebs: McCowan 15; Asts: Vanloo 9 PIR: Hartley 26	Arena: Kocaeli Atatürk Spor Salonu; Referees: Fatih Arslanoğlu, Nihat Çetin, Barış Turgut

25 March 2024 2	Galatasaray Çağdaş Faktoring	83–95 (Series: 1–1)	Mehmet Kavan Yapı İzmit Belediyespor	Ataköy, Bakırköy, Istanbul, Turkey
15:00 TRT (UTC+3)	Scoring by quarter: 22–25, 25–17, 18–23, 18–30
TBF TV - YouTube	Pts: Smith 25; Rebs: Yılmaz 7 Asts: three players 5 PIR: Smith 29	Boxscore; Report	Pts: Cora 30; Rebs: Hillsman 8 Asts: Nared 7 PIR: Cora 40	Arena: Ahmet Cömert Sport Hall; Referees: Zafer Yılmaz, Uğur Özen, Yarkın Keskin

27 March 2024 3	Mehmet Kavan Yapı İzmit Belediyespor	75–78 (Series: 1–2)	Galatasaray Çağdaş Faktoring	Kocaeli, Turkey
18:00 TRT (UTC+3)	Scoring by quarter: 15–16, 22–20, 20–26, 18–16
TBF TV - YouTube	Pts: Hillsman 21; Rebs: Hillsman 9 Asts: Cora 9 PIR: Hillsman 27	Boxscore; Report	Pts: Vanloo 20; Rebs: Smith 11; Asts: Hartley 6 PIR: Smith, Vanloo 20	Arena: Kocaeli Atatürk Spor Salonu; Referees: Yener Yılmaz, Aydın Karaçam, Halil Erkoç

===== Semifinals =====
Win Loss

29 March 2024 1	Fenerbahçe Alagöz Holding	83–66 (Series: 1–0)	Galatasaray Çağdaş Faktoring	Istanbul, Turkey
19:00 TRT (UTC+3)	Scoring by quarter: 22–20, 19–18, 20–7, 22–21
TBF TV - YouTube	Pts: Collier 20; Rebs: Collier 14; Asts: Anderson 8 PIR: Collier 29	Boxscore; Report	Pts: Hartley, Vanloo 14; Rebs: Smith 15; Asts: Vanloo 6 PIR: Smith 18	Arena: Fenerbahçe Metro Enerji Spor Salonu; Referees: Ali Serkan Emlek, Turgut Işık, Barış Turgut

2 April 2024 2	Galatasaray Çağdaş Faktoring	71–109 (Series: 0–2)	Fenerbahçe Alagöz Holding	Ataköy, Bakırköy, Istanbul, Turkey
20:30 TRT (UTC+3)	Scoring by quarter: 22–27, 16–18, 15–27, 18–37
TBF TV - YouTube	Pts: Smith 36; Rebs: McCowan 10; Asts: Hartley, Vanloo 5 PIR: Smith 29	Boxscore; Report	Pts: McBride 21; Rebs: Milić, Collier 10; Asts: Uzun 9 PIR: Collier, McBride 27	Arena: Ahmet Cömert Sport Hall; Referees: Orhan Çağrı Hekimoğlu, İbrahim Altıntaş, Nihat Çetin

=== EuroCup Women ===
==== Regular season ====
===== Group C =====
Pos	Team	Pld	W	L	PF	PA	PD	Pts	Qualification	GAL	ANG	KIR	CON
1	(Turkey) Galatasaray Cagdas Factoring	6	6	0	500	408	+92	12	Play-off round 1	—	74–62	102–66	83–77
2	(France) Union Féminine Angers	6	4	2	481	356	+125	10	Play-off round 1	70–71	—	90–52	95–61
3	(Lithuania) Kibirkštis	6	2	4	389	518	−129	8	Possible play-off round 1	57–87	50–96	—	87–78
4	(Romania) CMS Constanța	6	0	6	405	493	−88	6		76–83	48–68	65–77	—

Source: FIBA
Rules for classification: 1) Points; 2) Head-to-head record; 3) Head-to-head point differential. 4) General point differential 5) Points scored

==== Results summary ====
Overall						Home					Away				
Pld	W	L	PF	PA	PD	W	L	PF	PA	PD	W	L	PF	PA	PD
6	6	0	500	408	+92	3	0	259	205	+54	3	0	241	203	+38

Last updated: November 29, 2023.
Source: FIBA

==== Results by round ====
Round	1	2	3	4	5	6
Ground	H	A	A	A	H	H
Result	W	W	W	W	W	W
Position	2	1	1	1	1	1

Updated to match(es) played on November 29, 2023. Source: FIBA
A = Away; H = Home; W = Win; L = Loss

==== Matches ====
Note: All times, from 29 October 2023 to 31 March 2024, are CET (UTC+1); up to 29 October 2023 and from 31 March 2024, are CEST (UTC+2) as listed by EuroCup.

11 October 2023 1	Galatasaray Çağdaş Faktoring (Turkey)	83–77	(Romania) CMS Constanța	Ataköy, Bakırköy, Istanbul, Turkey
20:00 TRT (UTC+3)	Scoring by quarter: 29–27, 11–19, 22–10, 21–21
Youtube / FIBA TV, Galatasaray TV	Pts: Hines-Allen 19; Rebs: Hines-Allen 16; Asts: Vanloo 7 PIR: Hines-Allen 31	Boxscore; Report	Pts: Ghizila 21; Rebs: Živković 12; Asts: Mărginean 8 PIR: Živković 20	Arena: Ahmet Cömert Sport Hall; Referees: Alakbar Hasanov (Azerbaijan), Gilbert Hoxha (Albania), Hrvoje Cavar (Bosnia and Herzegovina)

18 October 2023 2	Union Féminine Angers (France)	70–71	(Turkey) Galatasaray Çağdaş Faktoring	Angers, France
20:00 (21:00 TRT)	Scoring by quarter: 23–27, 19–11, 14–16, 14–17
Youtube / FIBA TV, Galatasaray TV	Pts: Kaba 22; Rebs: Wojta 13; Asts: Monpierre 7 PIR: Wojta 23	Boxscore; Report	Pts: Hines-Allen 29; Rebs: Hines-Allen 11; Asts: Vanloo 8 PIR: Hines-Allen 35	Arena: Salle Jean Bouin; Referees: Armin Mutapcic (Germany), Sandra Sánchez González (Spain), Iyán González Gálvez (Spain)

26 October 2023 3	Kibirkštis (Lithuania)	57–87	(Turkey) Galatasaray Çağdaş Faktoring	Vilnius, Lithuania
19:00	Scoring by quarter: 18–32, 15–20, 13–16, 11–19
Youtube / FIBA TV, Galatasaray TV	Pts: Udodenko 15; Rebs: Udodenko 12; Asts: Donskichyte 6 PIR: Udodenko 17	Boxscore; Report	Pts: Hines-Allen 30; Rebs: Hines-Allen 18; Asts: Hines-Allen 5 PIR: Hines-Allen 44	Arena: Jeep Arena; Referees: Andrada Csender (Romania), Bogna Podkowińska (Poland), Blazo Begenisic (Sweden)

1 November 2023 4	CMS Constanța (Romania)	76–83	(Turkey) Galatasaray Çağdaş Faktoring	Constanța, Romania
20:30 (21:30 TRT)	Scoring by quarter: 23–24, 12–22, 20–16, 21–21
Youtube / FIBA TV, Galatasaray TV	Pts: Koizar 24; Rebs: Higgins 12; Asts: Živković 6 PIR: Higgins 27	Boxscore; Report	Pts: Ben Abdelkader 16; Rebs: Hines-Allen 15; Asts: Vanloo 9 PIR: Hines-Allen 23	Arena: Sala Sporturilor Constanta; Referees: Dénes Tozsér (Hungary), Nemanja Vlahović (Serbia), László Goda (Hungary)

22 November 2023 5	Galatasaray Çağdaş Faktoring (Turkey)	74–62	(France) Union Féminine Angers	Istanbul, Turkey
20:00 TRT (UTC+3)	Scoring by quarter: 20–13, 21–26, 19–8, 14–15
Youtube / FIBA TV, Galatasaray TV	Pts: Smith 22; Rebs: Hines-Allen 10; Asts: Vanloo 9 PIR: Smith 24	Boxscore; Report	Pts: Elenga 17; Rebs: Bailey 9 Asts: Kaba 6 PIR: Bailey 25	Arena: Şehit Mustafa Özel Spor Kompleksi; Referees: Kirile Tvauri (Georgia), Xhelal Mumini (Kosovo), Mateusz Skorek (Poland)

29 November 2023 6	Galatasaray Çağdaş Faktoring (Turkey)	102–66	(Lithuania) Kibirkštis	Ataköy, Bakırköy, Istanbul, Turkey
18:00 TRT (UTC+3)	Scoring by quarter: 26–21, 28–20, 21–7, 27–18
Youtube / FIBA TV, Galatasaray TV	Pts: Smith 26; Rebs: Hines-Allen 13; Asts: Vanloo 10; PIR: Hines-Allen 31	Boxscore; Report	Pts: Udodenko 21; Rebs: Udodenko 7 Asts: Sakeviciute, Donskichyte 5 PIR: Udodenko 20	Arena: Sinan Erdem Dome; Referees: Yasmina Alcaraz (Spain), Nemanja Ninkovic (Serbia), Dumitru Stasiev (Moldova)

==== Play-Off Round 1 ====
Win Loss

14 December 2023 1	MB Zagłębie Sosnowiec (Poland)	90–90	(Turkey) Galatasaray Çağdaş Faktoring	Sosnowiec, Poland
20:00 TRT (UTC+3)	Scoring by quarter: 21–29, 25–14, 23–26, 21–21
Youtube / FIBA TV, Galatasaray TV	Pts: January, Wadoux 19; Rebs: Zempare 10; Asts: January 12; PIR: January 29	Boxscore; Report	Pts: Smith 31; Rebs: Smith 12; Asts: Vanloo 14; PIR: Smith 37	Arena: ArcelorMittal Park; Referees: Gellert Kapitany (Hungary), Petr Blahout (Czechia), László Goda (Hungary)

20 December 2023 2	Galatasaray Çağdaş Faktoring (Turkey)	91–65 (181–155 agg.)	(Poland) MB Zagłębie Sosnowiec	Ataköy, Bakırköy, Istanbul, Turkey
17:00 TRT (UTC+3)	Scoring by quarter: 28–14, 15–12, 24–17, 24–22
Youtube / FIBA TV, Galatasaray TV	Pts: Smith 25; Rebs: Hines-Allen 17; Asts: Vanloo 9 PIR: Hines-Allen 34	Boxscore; Report	Pts: Wadoux 17; Rebs: Dornstauder 11; Asts: January 9 PIR: Dornstauder 19	Arena: Ahmet Cömert Sport Hall; Referees: Stylianos Simeonidis (Greece), Alin Faur (Romania), Sava Cetkovic (Montenegro)

==== Round of 16 ====
Win Loss

11 January 2024 1	AZS AJP Gorzów Wielkopolski (Poland)	73–87	(Turkey) Galatasaray Çağdaş Faktoring	Gorzów Wielkopolski, Poland
21:00 TRT (UTC+3)	Scoring by quarter: 23–19, 11–26, 21–21, 18–21
Youtube / FIBA TV	Pts: Tsineke 16; Rebs: Bibby 14; Asts: Tsineke, Wentzel 5 PIR: Telenga 24	Boxscore; Report	Pts: Hines-Allen 19; Rebs: Smith 20; Asts: Hines-Allen 9 PIR: Hines-Allen 31	Arena: Hala of AJP; Referees: Gintaras Vitkauskas (Lithuania), Andrada Csender (Romania), Aurimas Borusas (Lithuania)

18 January 2024 2	Galatasaray Çağdaş Faktoring (Turkey)	85–91 (172–164 agg.)	(Poland) AZS AJP Gorzów Wielkopolski	Ataköy, Bakırköy, Istanbul, Turkey
20:00 TRT (UTC+3)	Scoring by quarter: 18–26, 23–14, 25–22, 19–29
Youtube / FIBA TV	Pts: Vanloo 25; Rebs: Hines-Allen 9 Asts: Vanloo 12; PIR: Vanloo 32	Boxscore; Report	Pts: Tsineke 22; Rebs: Telenga 22; Asts: Wentzel 9 PIR: Telenga 30	Arena: Ahmet Cömert Sport Hall; Referees: Zdravko Rutesic (Montenegro), Vladimir Zanev (Bulgaria), Ciprian Stoica (Romania)

==== Quarterfinals ====
Win Loss

22 February 2024 1	Spar Girona (Spain)	77–64	(Turkey) Galatasaray Çağdaş Faktoring	Girona, Spain
21:00 TRT (UTC+3)	Scoring by quarter: 21–22, 19–12, 20–15, 17–15
Youtube / FIBA TV	Pts: Ygueravide 15; Rebs: López, Magarity 9 Asts: López, Ygueravide 5 PIR: Ygueravide 21	Boxscore; Report	Pts: Smith 16; Rebs: Smith 12; Asts: Vanloo 6 PIR: Smith 19	Arena: Pavelló Girona-Fontajau; Attendance: 5,197; Referees: Cecília Tóth (Hungary), Nikola Bejat (Norway), Ewa Matuszewska (Poland)

29 February 2024 2	Galatasaray Çağdaş Faktoring (Turkey)	81–83 (145–160 agg.)	(Spain) Spar Girona	Ataköy, Bakırköy, Istanbul, Turkey
20:00 TRT (UTC+3)	Scoring by quarter: 23–20, 15–19, 17–19, 26–25
Youtube / FIBA TV	Pts: McCowan 20; Rebs: Smith 11; Asts: Vanloo 5 PIR: McCowan 23	Boxscore; Report	Pts: Ygueravide 21; Rebs: Ygueravide 8 Asts: Mendy 7 PIR: Mendy 25	Arena: Ahmet Cömert Sport Hall; Referees: Vladimir Jevtovic (Serbia), Nikolaos Tziopanos (Greece), Christian Theis (Germany)

=== Turkish Women's Basketball Cup ===
==== Quarterfinals ====
Win Loss

Note: All times are TRT (UTC+3) as listed by the Turkish Basketball Federation.

2 January 2024 QF	Galatasaray Çağdaş Faktoring	65–76	ÇBK Mersin	Ataköy, Bakırköy, Istanbul, Turkey
18:00 TRT (UTC+3)	Scoring by quarter: 22–19, 15–18, 15–17, 13–22
	Pts: Yıldızhan, Vanloo 16; Rebs: Smith, Hines-Allen 8 Asts: Hines-Allen, Vanloo 6 PIR: Yıldızhan 19	Boxscore; Report	Pts: Williams 30; Rebs: Williams 7 Asts: Mabrey 9 PIR: Williams 36	Arena: Ahmet Cömert Sport Hall; Referees: Ali Serkan Emlek, Turgut Işık, Barış Turgut

== Statistics ==
=== Head coaches records ===
Head Coach	Competition	G	W	D	L	PF	PA	PD	Win %
Alper Durur	Women's Basketball Super League	5	2	0	3	352	367	–15	.400
Alper Durur	Total	5	2	0	3	352	367	–15	.400
Miloš Pađen	Women's Basketball Super League	18	13	0	5	1570	1482	+88	.722
Miloš Pađen	EuroCup Women	10	8	1	1	853	727	+126	.800
Miloš Pađen	Turkish Women's Basketball Cup	1	0	0	1	65	76	–11	.000
Miloš Pađen	Total	29	21	1	7	2488	2285	+203	.724
Tolga Esenci	Women's Basketball Super League	10	5	0	5	873	866	+7	.500
Tolga Esenci	EuroCup Women	2	0	0	2	145	160	–15	.000
Tolga Esenci	Total	12	5	0	7	1018	1026	–8	.417

Updated: April 3, 2024
