= Benkovic =

Benkovic, Benkovič, Benković is a surname. Notable people with the surname include:

- Federiko Benković (1667–1753) also known as Federico Bencovich; Croatian-Italian late Baroque painter
- Filip Benković (born 1997), Croatian football player
- Kristina Lelas Benković (born 1974), Croatian female basketball player
- Rok Benkovič (born 1986), Slovenian ski jumper
- Stephen J. Benkovic (born 1938), American biochemist
