= Rheda =

Rheda may refer to:

- Rheda (mythology), the Latinized form of the name of an Anglo-Saxon goddess
- Rheda, Germany, a town in North Rhine-Westphalia, Germany
- Reda, Poland, a town in Pomeranian Voivodeship, Poland

== See also ==
- Reda (disambiguation)
