= Reda =

Reda may refer to:

- Reda (surname), list of people with the surname
- Reda (given name), list of people with the given name
- Reda, Poland, a town in Poland
- Reda (river), a river in Poland
- Reda railway station, a railway station in Reda, Poland
- Reza (name), can be spelled Reda
- Reda (fabric mill)
