= Reda (given name) =

Reda is a unisex given name. Notable people with the name are as follows:

== Given name ==
=== Male ===
- Reda Aadel (born 1990), Moroccan cyclist
- Reda Abdel Aal (born 1965), Egyptian football player and coach
- Réda Abdenouz (born 1968), Algerian athlete
- Reda Acimi (born 1969), Algerian football player
- Reda Agourram (born 1990), Moroccan born-Canadian football player
- Reda El Amrani (born 1988), Moroccan tennis player
- Rédah Atassi (born 1991), Moroccan footballer
- Reda El Azab (born 1986), Egyptian football player
- Réda Babouche (born 1979), Algerian football player
- Reda El-Batoty (born 1963), Egyptian weightlifter
- Reda Belahyane (born 2004), French-Moroccan footballer
- Reda Bellahcene (born 1993), French football player
- Reda Benbaziz (born 1993), Algerian boxer
- Reda Benchaa (born 2002), French-Algerian footballer
- Reda Benchehima (born 1978), Algerian fence
- Reda Bennani (born 2007), Moroccan tennis player
- Réda Benzine (born 1971), Algerian athlete
- Reda Boultam (born 1998), Dutch football player
- Réda Dalil (1978–2024), Moroccan journalist and writer
- Reda Benhadj Djillali (born 1978), Algerian football player
- Reda Doumaz (born 1956), Algerian musical artist
- Reda Elazouar (born 1999), British actor
- Reda Ereyahi (born 1972), Moroccan football player
- Reda Haikal (born 1990), Egyptian volleyball player
- Reda Hajhouj (born 1994), Moroccan football player
- Réda Halaïmia (born 1996), Algerian footballer
- Reda Hegazy (born 1959), Egyptian politician
- Reda Helal, Egyptian journalist
- Reda Jaadi (born 1995), Belgium-born Moroccan football player
- Réda Johnson (born 1988), French football player
- Reda Kateb (born 1977), French actor
- Reda Khadra (born 2001), German football player
- Reda Kharchouch (born 1995), Dutch football player
- Reda Laalaoui (born 2005), Moroccan football player
- Reda Majji (born 2001), Moroccan footballer
- Reda R. Mankbadi, Egyptian-American university dean
- Reda Mansour (born 1965), Israeli historian and diplomat
- Reda Mahmoud Hafez Mohamed (1952–2013), Egyptian Air Force officer
- Reda bin Mohammed Saeed Obeid (1936–2026), Saudi academic and civil servant
- Reda Oudgou, French kickboxer
- Réda Rabeï (born 1994), French footballer
- Reda Rhalimi (born 1982), Moroccan basketball player
- Réda Sayah (born 1989), Algerian football player
- Reda Seireg (born 1949), Egyptian major general
- Reda Seyam (born 1959/60), German-Egyptian militant
- Reda Shehata (born 1981), Egyptian football player
- Reda Slim (born 1999), Moroccan football player
- Reda Taliani (born 1980), Algerian raï singer and musician
- Reda Al Tawarghi (born 1979), Libyan football player
- Reda Wardi (born 1995), French rugby union player
- Reda El-Weshi (born 1985), Egyptian football player
- Reda Yadi (born 1963), Algerian swimmer
- Reda Zeguili (born 1963), Algerian handball coach

=== Female ===
- Reda Gaudiamo (born 1962), Indonesian author and musician
- Reda Aleliūnaitė-Jankovska (born 1973), Lithuanian basketball player
- Reda Ribinskaitė (born 1966), Lithuanian rower

== Middle name ==
- Ahmed Reda Madouni (born 1980), Algerian football player
- Ahmed Reda Tagnaouti (born 1996), Moroccan football player

== Stage name ==
- Reda Caire, stage name of the Egyptian-born French opera singer Joseph Gandhour (1908–1963)

== Fictional characters ==
- Reda Hashem, one of the Homeland characters
