= Mısra Albayrak =

Turkish basketball player

Kayseri Basketbol
- Position: Shooting guard
- League: Turkish Super League

Personal information
- Born: 10 October 2000 (age 26) Turkey
- Listed height: 5 ft 9 in (1.75 m)

Career history
- 2018–2022: Galatasaray
- 2022–: Melikgazi Kayseri Basketbol

Mısra Albayrak (born 10 October 2000) is a Turkish female basketball player. The 1.75 m (5 ft 9 in) national plays Shooting guard.

== Career ==
=== Galatasaray ===
She was trained in Galatasaray girls' basketball academy. He signed a contract with the A team in the 2018-19 season. On 28 July 2022, she announced that she said goodbye to the Galatasaray club with the post she made on her social media account.
