= Dilara Kaya =

Turkish basketball player

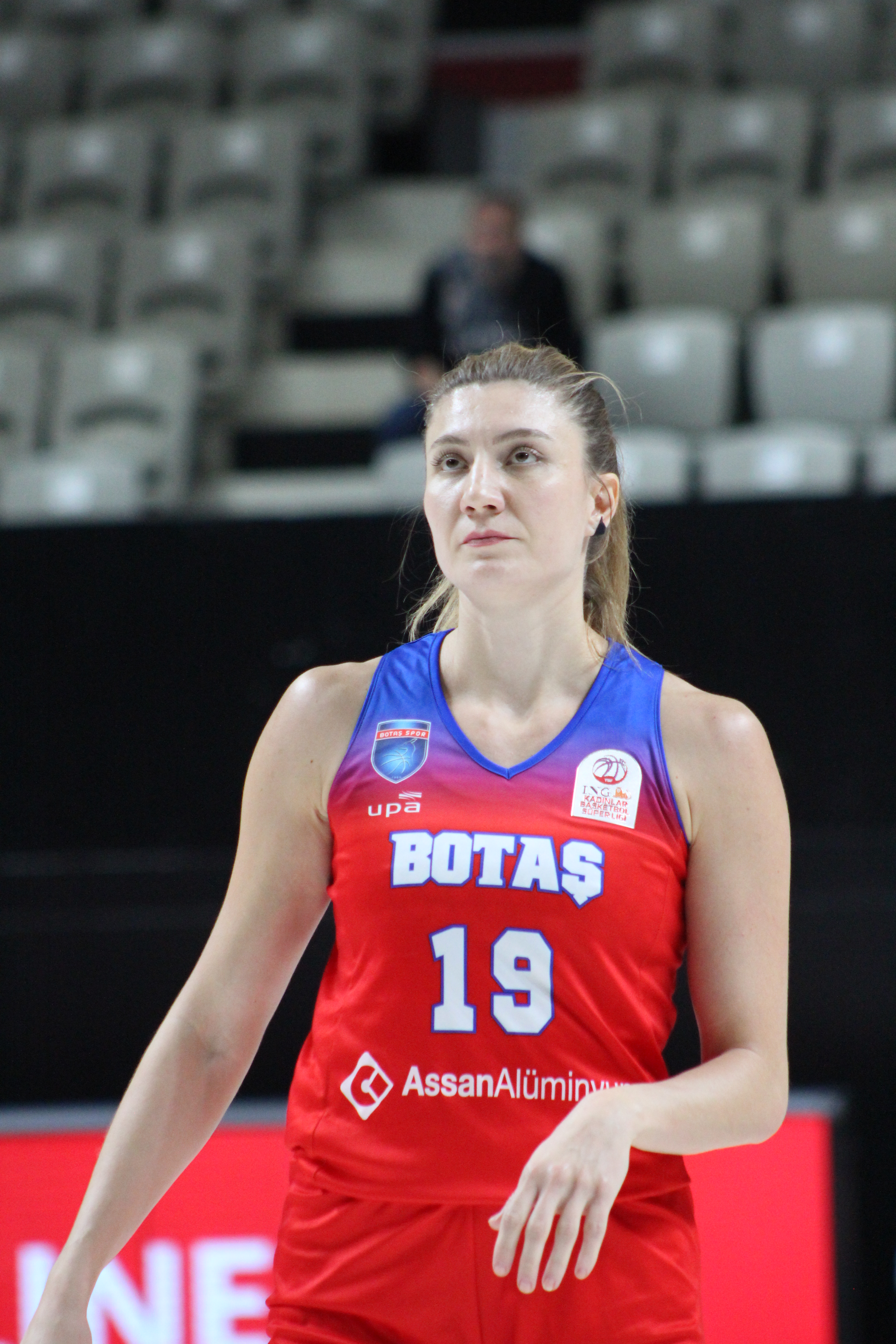

Galatasaray Medical Park
- Position: Power forward
- League: Turkish Women's Basketball League

Personal information
- Born: November 7, 1991 (age 35) Fatih, Istanbul, Turkey
- Listed height: 6 ft 1 in (1.85 m)

Career information
- Playing career: 2009–present

Career history
- 2007–present: Galatasaray

Dilara Kaya (born 7 November 1991) is a Turkish professional basketball player of Galatasaray Medical Park.

== Honors ==
- Turkish Women's Basketball League
  - Runners-up (1): 2009–10
- Turkish Cup
  - Winners (1): 2009–10
- FIBA SuperCup
  - Runners-up (1): 2009

== See also ==
- Turkish women in sports
