= Galatasaray S.K. wheelchair basketball team rosters =

This page contains past rosters of the Galatasaray S.K. (wheelchair basketball) team.

== 2000 Era ==
=== 2005–06 ===
Roster

- (Turkey) Ahmet Mencik
- (Turkey) Ali Asker Turan
- (Turkey) Aytaç Ercan
- (Turkey) Can Polat Çolak
- (Turkey) Eyüp Atırcıoğlu
- (Turkey) Ferit Gümüş
- (Turkey) Selim Demirdağ
- (Turkey) Selim Sayak
- (Turkey) Şuayip Kablan
- (Turkey) Umut Akbay
- (Turkey) Umut Ünar
- (Turkey) Volkan Aydeniz
- Head coach: (Turkey) Remzi Sedat İncesu

=== 2006–07 ===
Titles

- (Turkey) Turkish Wheelchair Basketball Super League

Roster

- (Turkey) Ahmet Mencik
- (Turkey) Ali Asker Turan
- (Turkey) Eyüp Atırcıoğlu
- (Turkey) Ferit Gümüş
- (Turkey) Özgür Gürbulak
- (Czech Republic) Petr Tucek
- (Turkey) Selim Demirdağ
- (Turkey) Selim Sayak
- (Turkey) Serdar Antaç
- (Turkey) Şuayip Kablan
- (Turkey) Uğur Savluk
- (Turkey) Volkan Aydeniz
- Head coach: (Turkey) Remzi Sedat İncesu

=== 2007–08 ===
Titles

- (Turkey) Turkish Wheelchair Basketball Super League

Roster

- (Turkey) Abdülgazi Kahraman
- (Turkey) Ahmet Mencik
- (Turkey) Ali Asker Turan
- (Turkey) Eyüp Atırcıoğlu
- (Turkey) Ferit Gümüş
- (Iraq) (Sweden) Hussein Haidari
- (Turkey) İsmail Ar
- (Australia) Justin Eveson
- (Turkey) Özgür Gürbulak
- (Czech Republic) Petr Tucek
- (Turkey) Selim Demirdağ
- (Turkey) Selim Sayak
- (Turkey) Serdar Antaç
- (Turkey) Seyran Orman Kurt
- Head coach: (Turkey) Remzi Sedat İncesu

=== 2008–09 ===
Titles

- (Turkey) Turkish Wheelchair Basketball Super League

Roster

- (Turkey) Ferit Gümüş
- (Turkey) Fikri Gündoğdu
- (Iraq) (Sweden) Hussein Haidari
- (Turkey) İsmail Ar
- (Australia) Justin Eveson
- (United States) Matt Scott
- (Czech Republic) Petr Tucek
- (Turkey) Selim Demirdağ
- (Turkey) Selim Sayak
- (Turkey) Serdar Antaç
- (Turkey) Seyran Orman Kurt
- (Turkey) Şuayip Kablan
- (Australia) Troy Sachs
- Head coach: (Turkey) Remzi Sedat İncesu

=== 2009–10 ===
Titles

- (Turkey) Turkish Wheelchair Basketball Super League

Roster

- (Israel) Dotan Meishar
- (Turkey) Ferit Gümüş
- (Turkey) Fikri Gündoğdu
- (Iraq) (Sweden) Hussein Haidari
- (Turkey) İsmail Ar
- (Australia) Justin Eveson
- (United States) Matt Scott
- (Turkey) Murat Yazıcı
- (Czech Republic) Petr Tucek
- (Turkey) Ramazan Kahraman
- (Turkey) Selim Sayak
- (Turkey) Seyran Orman Kurt
- Head coach: (Turkey) Remzi Sedat İncesu

== 2010 Era ==
=== 2010–11 ===
Titles

- (Turkey) Turkish Wheelchair Basketball Super League

Roster

- (Turkey) Fikri Gündoğdu
- (Turkey) İsmail Ar
- (United States) Jaime Luis Mazzi
- (Poland) Mateusz Filipski
- (United States) Matt Scott
- (Turkey) Murat Yazıcı
- (Turkey) Ömer Gürkan
- (Turkey) Özgür Gürbulak
- (Czech Republic) Petr Tucek
- (Turkey) Ramazan Kahraman
- (Turkey) Seyran Orman Kurt
- (Turkey) Volkan Aydeniz
- Head coach: (Turkey) Remzi Sedat İncesu

=== 2011–12 ===
Titles

- (Turkey) Turkish Wheelchair Basketball Super League

Roster

- (Turkey) Ali Asker Turan
- (Turkey) Ferit Gümüş
- (Turkey) Fikri Gündoğdu
- (Turkey) İsmail Ar
- (Poland) Mateusz Filipski
- (United States) Matt Scott
- (Turkey) Murat Yazıcı
- (Turkey) Özgür Gürbulak
- (Poland) Piotr Luszynski
- (Turkey) Seda Kınalı
- (Turkey) Serdar Antaç
- (Turkey) Seyran Orman Kurt
- (Australia) Tristan Knowles
- (Turkey) Umut Ünar
- Head coach: (Turkey) Remzi Sedat İncesu

=== 2012–13 ===
Titles

- (Turkey) Turkish Wheelchair Basketball Super League

Roster

- (Turkey) Bestami Boz
- (Turkey) Ferit Gümüş
- (Turkey) Fikri Gündoğdu
- (Turkey) İsmail Ar
- (Poland) Mateusz Filipski
- (United States) Matt Scott
- (Turkey) Murat Yazıcı
- (Turkey) Mustafa Korkmaz
- (Turkey) Özgür Gürbulak
- (Poland) Piotr Luszynski
- (Turkey) Serdar Sağlam
- (Turkey) Seyran Orman Kurt
- (Algeria) (France) Sofyane Mehiaoui
- (Australia) Tristan Knowles
- (Turkey) Umut Ünar
- Head coach: (Turkey) Remzi Sedat İncesu

=== 2013–14 ===
Titles

- (Turkey) Turkish Wheelchair Basketball Super League

Roster

- (Turkey) Bestami Boz
- (Turkey) Cem Gezinci
- (Turkey) Ferit Gümüş
- (Turkey) Fikri Gündoğdu
- (Turkey) İsmail Ar
- (Poland) Mateusz Filipski
- (United States) Matt Scott
- (Turkey) Murat Yazıcı
- (Poland) Piotr Luszynski
- (Colombia) Rodney Hawkins
- (Turkey) Seda Kınalı
- (Turkey) Seyran Orman Kurt
- (Algeria) (France) Sofyane Mehiaoui
- (Turkey) Özgür Gürbulak
- Head coach: (Turkey) Remzi Sedat İncesu

=== 2014–15 ===
Titles

- (Turkey) Turkish Wheelchair Basketball Super League

Roster

- (Spain) Alejandro Zarzuela
- (Turkey) Bestami Boz
- (Turkey) Cem Gezinci
- (Turkey) Ferit Gümüş
- (Turkey) Fikri Gündoğdu
- (Turkey) İsmail Ar
- (Poland) Mateusz Filipski
- (United States) Matt Scott
- (Turkey) Murat Yazıcı
- (Poland) Piotr Luszynski
- (Colombia) Rodney Hawkins
- (Turkey) Seyran Orman Kurt
- (Turkey) Seda Kınalı
- (Turkey) Özgür Gürbulak
- Head coach: (Turkey) Remzi Sedat İncesu

=== 2015–16 ===
Roster

- (Turkey) Fikri Gündoğdu
- (Turkey) İsmail Ar
- (Turkey) Seda Kınalı
- (Poland) (Turkey) Piotr Luszynski (Mehmet Türk)
- (Poland) (Turkey) Mateusz Filipski (Mete Sarı)
- Head coach: (Turkey) Remzi Sedat İncesu

=== 2016–17 ===
Roster

- (Turkey) Aytaç Ercan
- (Turkey) Akın Celal
- (Turkey) Bülent Yılmaz
- (Turkey) Enes Bulut
- (Turkey) Fikri Gündoğdu
- (Turkey) Halil İbrahim Bağlı
- (Turkey) İsmail Ar
- (Turkey) Mustafa Muhittinoğlu
- (Turkey) Mustafa Korkmaz
- (Turkey) Maşide Cesur
- (Germany) Robin Poggenwisch
- (Turkey) Seda Kınalı
- Head coach: (Turkey) Remzi Sedat İncesu

=== 2017–18 ===
Titles

- (Turkey) Turkish Wheelchair Basketball Super League

Roster

- (Turkey) Bulut Kodal
- (Turkey) Fikri Gündoğdu
- (Turkey) Gökhan Coşkun
- (Turkey) İsmail Ar
- (Poland) Krsztof Bandura
- (Turkey) Maşide Cesur
- (Poland) (Turkey) Mateusz Filipski (Mete Sarı)
- (Turkey) Mustafa Korkmaz
- (Poland) (Turkey) Piotr Luszynski (Mehmet Türk)
- (Colombia) Rodney Hawkins
- (Turkey) Seda Kınalı
- (Turkey) Özgür Gürbulak
- Head coach: (Turkey) Remzi Sedat İncesu

=== 2018–19 ===
Roster

- (Turkey) Bulut Kodal
- (Turkey) Fikri Gündoğdu
- (Turkey) Gökhan Coşkun
- (Turkey) İsmail Ar
- (Turkey) Maşide Cesur
- (Iran) Mehdi Ghorbani
- (Turkey) Özgür Gürbulak
- (Turkey) Seda Kınalı
- Head coach: (Turkey) Remzi Sedat İncesu

=== 2019–20 ===
Roster

- (Turkey) Bulut Kodal
- (Turkey) Fikri Gündoğdu
- (Turkey) Gökhan Coşkun
- (Turkey) İsmail Ar
- (Turkey) Maşide Cesur
- (Iran) Mehdi Ghorbani
- (Poland) (Turkey) Piotr Luszynski (Mehmet Türk)
- (Turkey) Seda Kınalı
- (Turkey) Özgür Gürbulak
- Head coach: (Turkey) Remzi Sedat İncesu

== 2020 Era ==
=== 2020–21 ===
Roster

- (Turkey) Bulut Kodal
- (Turkey) Enes Bulut
- (Turkey) Fikri Gündoğdu
- (Turkey) Gökhan Coşkun
- (Turkey) İsmail Ar
- (Turkey) Murat Arslanoğlu
- (Turkey) Maşide Cesur
- (Turkey) Seda Kınalı
- (Turkey) Özgür Gürbulak
- Head coach: (Turkey) Remzi Sedat İncesu

=== 2021–22 ===
Roster

- (Turkey) Buğra Ergun
- (Turkey) Bülent Yılmaz
- (Turkey) Deniz Acar
- (Turkey) Enes Bulut
- (Turkey) Fikri Gündoğdu
- (Turkey) Hüseyin Avni Dalman
- (Turkey) Maşide Cesur
- (Turkey) Mustafa Muhittinoğlu
- (Turkey) Mücahit Günaydın
- (Turkey) Uğur Toprak
- Head coach: (Turkey) Remzi Sedat İncesu

=== 2022–23 ===
Roster

- (Turkey) Başar Koç
- (Turkey) Buğra Ergun
- (Turkey) Cem Gezinci
- (Turkey) Enes Bulut
- (Turkey) Fikri Gündoğdu
- (Turkey) Hüseyin Avni Dalman
- (Turkey) Maşide Cesur
- (Turkey) Mücahit Günaydın
- (Turkey) Özgür Gürbulak
- (Poland) (Turkey) Piotr Luszynski (Mehmet Türk)
- (Turkey) Serhat Özbudak
- Head coach: (Turkey) Remzi Sedat İncesu

=== 2023–24 ===
Roster

- (Turkey) Buğra Ergün
- (Turkey) Cem Gezginci
- (Turkey) Enes Bulut
- (Turkey) Ferit Gümüş
- (Turkey) Hüseyin Avni Dalman
- (Turkey) İlhan Tuncay
- (Turkey) İsmail Ar
- (Iran) Mahdi Abbasishotoryeh
- (Iran) Mohammad Hassan Sayari
- (Iran) Morteza Abedi
- (Turkey) Mücahit Günaydın
- Head coach: (Turkey) Remzi Sedat İncesu

=== 2024–25 ===
Titles

- (Turkey) Turkish Wheelchair Basketball Super League
- EuroCup 1

Roster

- (Turkey) Buğra Ergün
- (Turkey) Ebru Akıcı
- (Turkey) Enes Bulut
- (Turkey) Ferit Gümüş
- (United Kingdom) Harrison David Brown
- (Turkey) İsmail Ar
- (United Kingdom) Lee Shane Manning
- (Poland) (Turkey) Mateusz Filipski (Mete Sarı)
- (Iran) Mahdi Abbasishotoryeh
- (Turkey) Mücahit Günaydın
- (Turkey) Selvihan Uzun
- Head coach: (Turkey) Remzi Sedat İncesu / (Turkey) Fikri Gündoğdu

=== 2025–26 ===
Roster

- (Turkey) Arda Albayrak
- (Turkey) Buğra Ergün
- (Turkey) Burak Ayğan
- (Turkey) Deniz Acar
- (Turkey) Ebru Akıcı
- (Turkey) Enes Bulut
- (Turkey) Ferit Gümüş
- (Turkey) İsmail Ar
- (Turkey) Kemal Kaan Şafak
- (United Kingdom) Lee Shane Manning
- (Iran) Mahdi Abbasishotoryeh
- (Poland) (Turkey) Mateusz Filipski (Mete Sarı)
- (Turkey) Selvihan Uzun
- Head coach: (Turkey) Fikri Gündoğdu
