= Reda (surname) =

Reda is a surname. Notable people with the surname include:

- Felix Reda, German politician and Member of the European Parliament for the Pirate Party (2014–2019)
- Francesco Reda, Italian cyclist
- Getachew Reda, Ethiopian politician
- Gino Reda, Canadian sports journalist
- Giovanni Reda, an American photographer and skateboarding filmmaker
- Jacques Réda, contemporary French poet
- Mahmoud Reda, Egyptian choreographer and dancer
- Marco Reda, Canadian soccer player
- Orfeo Reda (1932–2025), Italian painter and artist
- Robin Reda, French politician
- Shereen Reda, Egyptian actress
