= Tuğba Taşçı =

Turkish basketball player

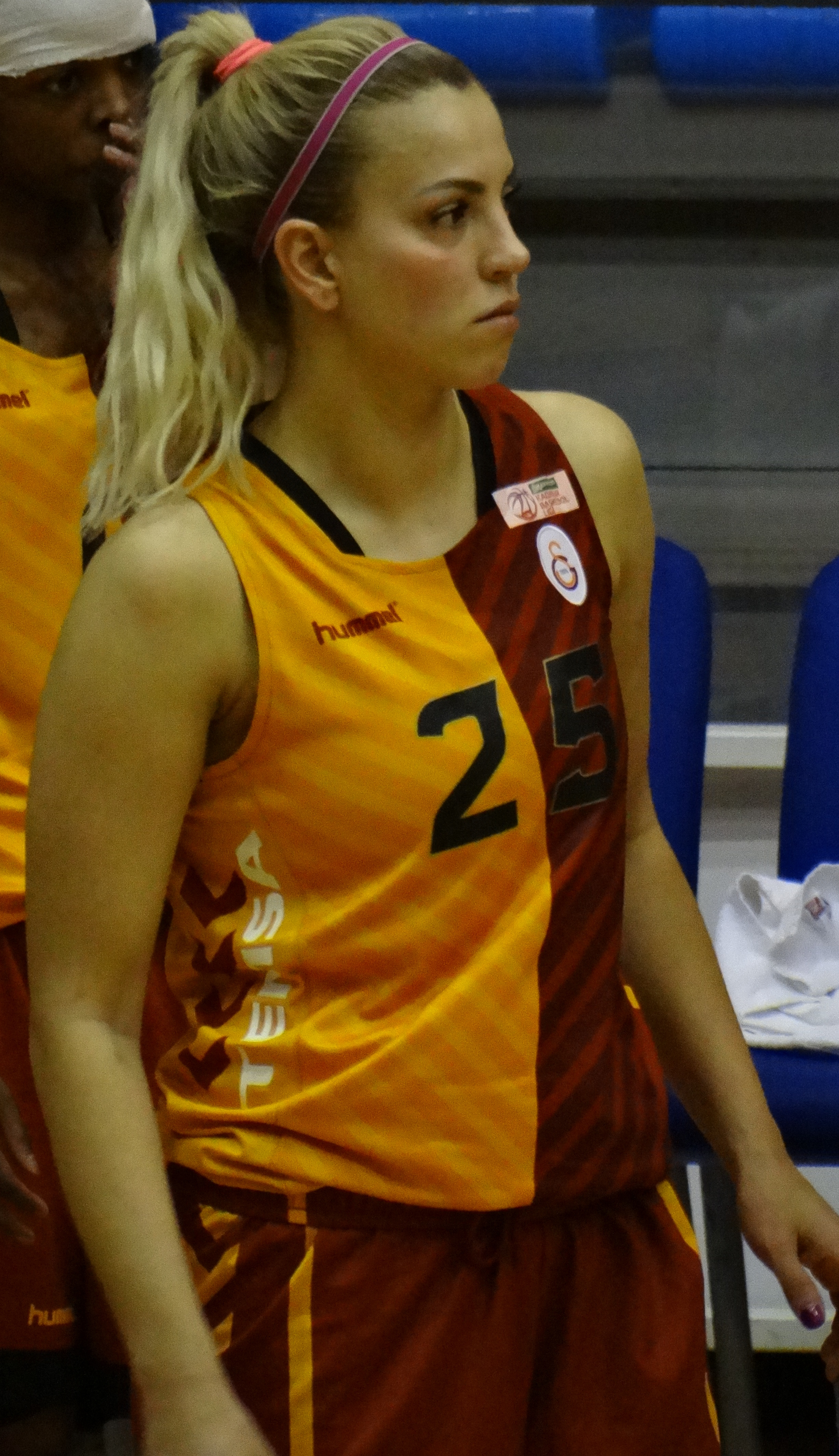

Personal information
- Born: 19 August 1984 (age 42) Istanbul, Turkey
- Listed height: 5 ft 10 in (1.78 m)

Career information
- Playing career: 2000–present
- Position: Shooting guard

Career history
- 2000–2005: Galatasaray
- 2005–2006: Ceyhan Belediyesi
- 2006–2007: Migros
- 2007–2008: Ceyhan Belediyesi
- 2008–2012: Beşiktaş Cola Turka
- 2012–2013: Kayseri Kaski
- 2013–2015: Beşiktaş Cola Turka
- 2015–2016: Mersin Metropolitan Municipality
- 2016–2017: Canik Belediyespor
- 2017–: Galatasaray

Tuğba Taşçı (born 19 August 1984) is a Turkish professional basketball player, formally of Kayseri Kaski. The 1.78 m (5 ft 10 in) Tuğba plays shooting guard.

== See also ==
- Turkish women in sports
