= Esra Şencebe =

Turkish basketball player

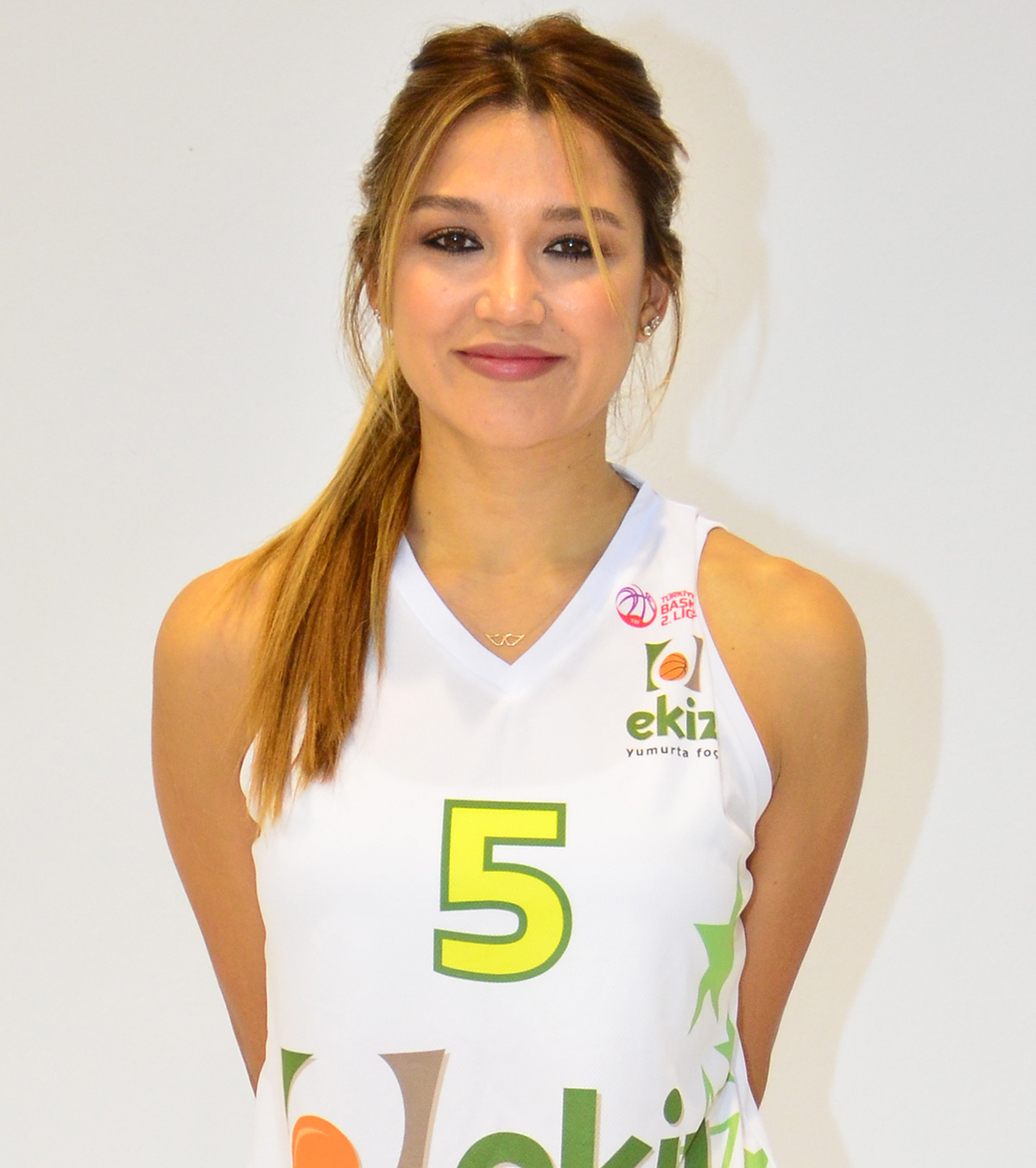

Personal information
- Born: December 21, 1981 (age 44) Malatya, Turkey
- Listed height: 5 ft 7 in (1.70 m)
- Listed weight: 137 lb (62 kg)

Career information
- Playing career: 1999–2018
- Position: Shooting guard

Career history
- 1999–2000: Erdemir Ereğli
- 2000–2001: İÜSK
- 2001–2002: Galatasaray
- 2002–2003: Erdemir Ereğli
- 2003–2006: Fenerbahçe
- 2006–2007: TED Kayseri Koleji
- 2007–2010: Galatasaray
- 2010–2012: Beşiktaş Cola Turka
- 2012–2013: Fenerbahçe
- 2013–2014: Galatasaray
- 2015–2016: Ekiz Yumurta Foça Basketbol
- 2016–2017: Bornova Becker Spor
- 2017–2018: Kırçiçeği Bodrum Basketbol

Esra Şencebe (born 21 December 1981) is a Turkish former professional basketball player.

== Honors ==
- Turkish Women's Basketball League
  - Winners (3): 2003-04, 2005–06, 2012–13
  - Runners-up (3): 2004-05, 2007–08, 2009–10
- Turkish Cup
  - Winners (4): 2003-04, 2004–05, 2005–06, 2009–10
- Turkish Presidents Cup
  - Winners (3): 2003-04, 2004–05, 2007–08
  - Runners-up (1): 2005-06
- EuroCup Women
  - Winners (1): 2008-09
- FIBA SuperCup
  - Runners-up (1): 2009
