= Nihan Anaz =

Turkish basketball player

Personal information
- Born: April 29, 1979 (age 47) Ankara, Turkey
- Listed height: 5 ft 9 in (1.75 m)

Career information
- College: UC Berkeley, California (2002–2004); Weatherford College (2001–2002); South Carolina (2000–2001)
- Playing career: 2004–2017
- Position: Shooting guard

Career history
- 1996–1999: Galatasaray
- 2004–2006: Beşiktaş Cola Turka
- 2006–2007: Tarsus Belediyesi
- 2007: Galatasaray
- 2007–2008: Migros
- 2008: Çankaya Üniversitesi
- 2008–2009: Samsun Basketbol
- 2009–2010: Panküp Kayseri Şekerspor
- 2010–2011: Galatasaray
- 2011–2012: Beşiktaş
- 2012–2013: Canik Samsun
- 2013–2014: Osmaniye
- 2014–2015: BGD
- 2015–2017: Bodrum Basketbol

Career highlights
- All Pac-10 (2004)

Nihan Anaz (born 29 April 1979) is a Turkish former professional basketball player.

== South Carolina and California statistics ==
Legend
GP	Games played	GS	Games started	MPG	Minutes per game
FG%	Field goal percentage	3P%	3-point field goal percentage	FT%	Free throw percentage
RPG	Rebounds per game	APG	Assists per game	SPG	Steals per game
BPG	Blocks per game	PPG	Points per game	**Bold**	Career high

Year	Team	GP	Points	FG%	3P%	FT%	RPG	APG	SPG	BPG	PPG
2000-01	South Carolina	28	256	42.1%	31.6%	67.6%	2.1	2.4	0.6	0.0	9.1
2001-02	Weathherford	Stats not found									
2002-03	California	24	243	33.4%	18.4%	**72.3%**	2.5	**2.4**	1.5	0.0	10.1
2003-04	California	**29**	**408**	**45.6%**	**31.1%**	68.8%	**3.8**	2.3	**1.8**	**0.1**	**14.1**
Career		81	907	40.6%	81.0%	115.7%	50.5	2.4	1.3	0.1	11.2

== Honors ==
- **Turkish Women's Basketball League**
  - Winners (1): 2004-05

== See also ==
- Turkish women in sports
