= Yasemen Saylar =

Turkish basketball player

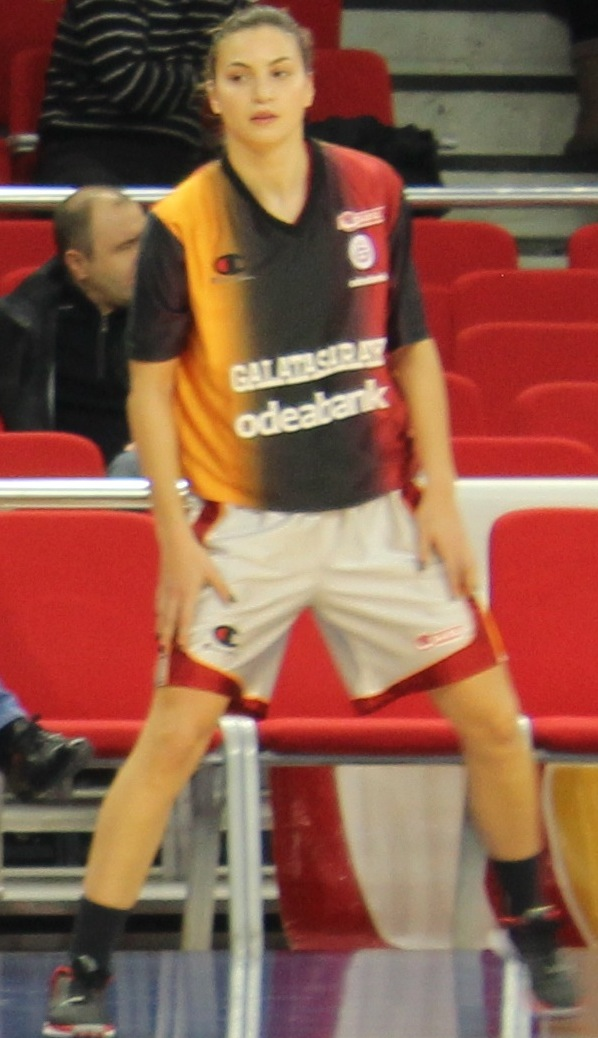

Personal information
- Born: September 7, 1990 (age 36) Istanbul, Turkey
- Listed height: 5 ft 10 in (1.78 m)
- Listed weight: 137 lb (62 kg)

Career information
- Playing career: 2006–2016
- Position: Point guard

Career history
- 2001–2006: Galatasaray Youth Team
- 2006–2014: Galatasaray
- 2014–2015: Hatay Büyükşehir Belediye Spor Kulübü
- 2015–2016: Basketbolu Geliştirenler Derneği Spor Klubü

Yasemen Saylar (born 7 September 1990) is a Turkish former professional basketball player.

== Honors ==
- Turkish Women's Basketball League
  - Runners-up (2): 2007-08, 2009–10
- Turkish Cup
  - Winners (1): 2009-10
- Turkish Presidents Cup
  - Winners (1): 2007-08
- EuroCup Women
  - Winners (1): 2008-09
- FIBA SuperCup
  - Runners-up (1): 2009
