= Miray Balotu =

Turkish basketball player

Bursa Uludağ Basketbol
- Position: Power forward
- League: Women's Basketball Super League

Personal information
- Born: 8 April 2001 (age 25) Istanbul, Turkey
- Listed height: 6 ft 0 in (1.83 m)

Career history
- 2010–2017: Galatasaray (youth)
- 2017–2023: Galatasaray
- 2021–2022: → Nilüfer Basketbol Sevenler İstanbul
- 2023–: Bursa Uludağ Basketbol

Miray Balotu (born 8 April 2001) is a Turkish basketball player. The 1.83 m (6 ft 0 in) national plays Power forward.

== Career ==
=== Galatasaray ===
She was trained in Galatasaray girls' basketball academy. He signed a contract with the A team in the 2017–18 season.

As of July 2023, his contract has expired. Galatasaray club said goodbye to the player on July 6, 2023, by publishing a thank you message.
