= Kristina Lelas Benković =

Croatian basketball player

Personal information
- Born: 15 April 1974 (age 52) Zagreb, SFR Yugoslavia
- Listed height: 1.96 m (6 ft 5 in)

Career information
- Playing career: –2008
- Position: Center

Career history
- 2000–2001: Galatasaray S.K.
- 2007–2008: Olesa Espanyol

Kristina Lelas, married Benković, (born 15 April 1974 in Zagreb, SFR Yugoslavia) is a former Croatian female basketball player.
