= İnci Güçlü =

Turkish basketball player

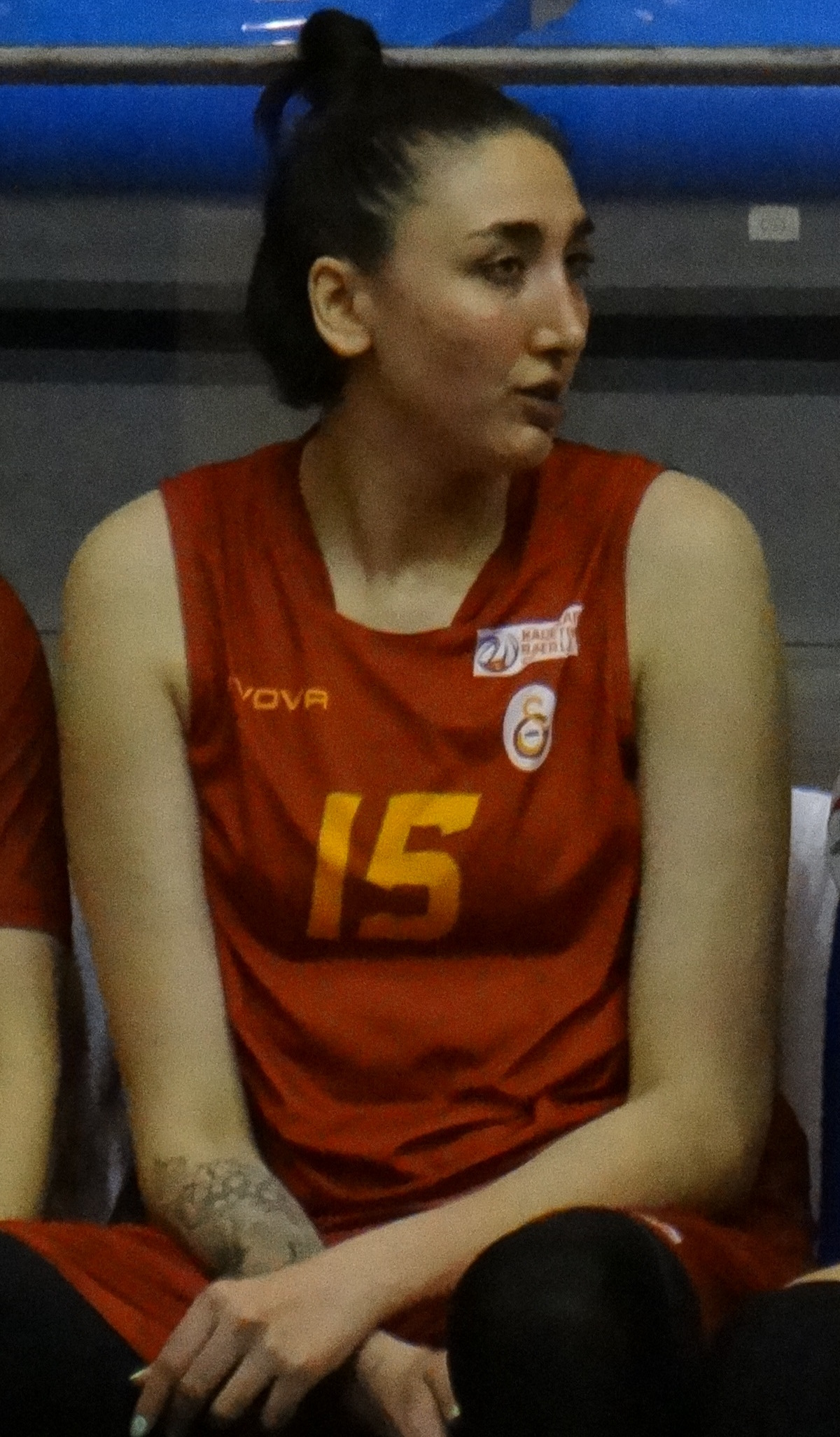

Emlak Konut Spor Kulübü
- Position: Center
- League: Turkish Super League

Personal information
- Born: 26 February 1999 (age 27) Adana, Turkey
- Listed height: 6 ft 9 in (2.06 m)
- Listed weight: 192 lb (87 kg)

Career information
- Playing career: 2010–present

Career history
- 2010–2013: Botaş SK
- 2013–2020: Galatasaray
- 2020: Barcelona
- 2020–2021: İzmit Belediyespor
- 2021: Botaş SK
- 2021–2022: Çankaya Üniversitesi
- 2022–2023: Beşiktaş
- 2023–2024: Galatasaray
- 2024–: Emlak Konut Spor Kulübü

İnci Güçlü (born 26 February 1999) is a Turkish female basketball player. The 2.05 m (6 ft 8 1/2 in) national plays Center.

== Club career ==
=== Barcelona (2020) ===
On 30 May 2020, she signed a 2-year contract with the Spanish team Barcelona.

=== Beşiktaş (2022–2023) ===
On 5 August 2022, she signed a 1-year contract with Beşiktaş.

=== Galatasaray (2023–2024) ===
She returned to her old team by signing a contract with Galatasaray on 3 August 2023.

Galatasaray bid her farewell on May 15, 2024 by releasing a thank you message for her "efforts and dedication" in the yellow and red jersey as her contract came to an end at the conclusion of the season.
