= Eda Şahin =

Turkish basketball player

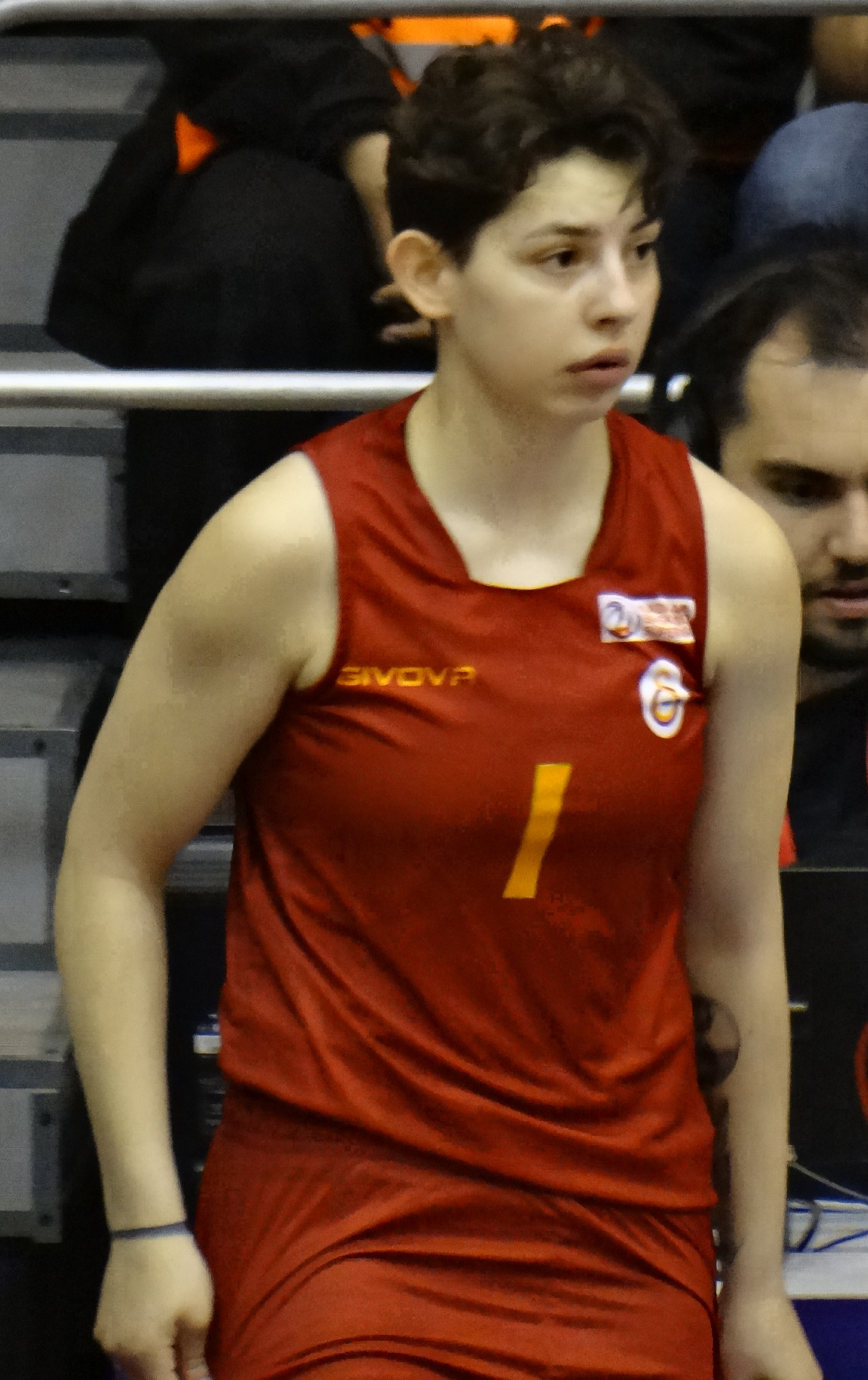

Hatayspor
- Position: Point guard
- League: Turkish Super League

Personal information
- Born: 26 August 1999 (age 27) Istanbul, Turkey
- Listed height: 5 ft 7 in (1.70 m)

Career history
- 2016–2022: Galatasaray
- 2022–: Hatayspor

Eda Şahin (born 26 August 1999) is a Turkish female basketball player. The 1.70 m (5 ft 7 in) national plays Point guard.

== Career ==
She was trained in Galatasaray girls' basketball academy. He signed a contract with the A team in the 2016-17 season.
