= Sude Yılmaz =

Turkish basketball player

No. 8 – Galatasaray
- Position: Small forward
- League: Women's Basketball Super League; EuroLeague Women

Personal information
- Born: 15 March 2002 (age 24) Istanbul, Turkey
- Listed height: 6 ft 0 in (1.83 m)

Career information
- Playing career: 2015–present

Career history
- 2015–present: Galatasaray

Sude Yılmaz (born 15 March 2002) is a Turkish basketball player for Galatasaray and the Turkish national team.

== Career ==
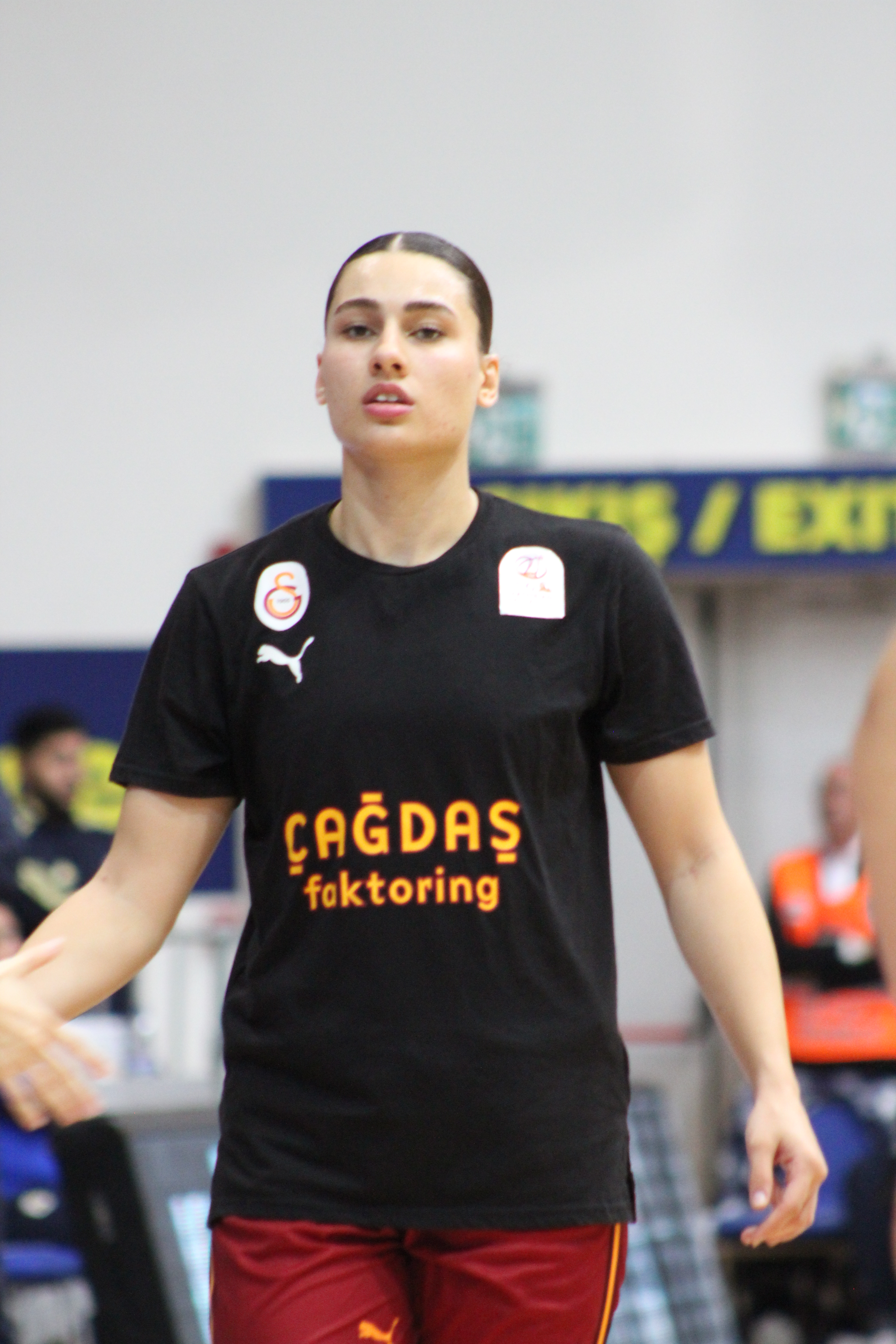
Yılmaz in 2024

On 16 May 2025, she signed a new contract with Galatasaray, valid until the end of the 2025–26 season.

She signed a new two-year contract with Galatasaray on July 14, 2026.
