= Reda Aleliūnaitė-Jankovska =

Soviet and Lithuanian basketball player (born 1973)

Personal information
- Born: 24 January 1973 (age 53) Kaunas, Lithuanian SSR, Soviet Union
- Listed height: 1.90 m (6 ft 3 in)
- Position: Center

Career history
- 1989-1995: Laisvė Kaunas
- 1995-1997: Quay AZS Poznań
- 1997-1998: Good Angels Košice
- 1998-1999: Galatasaray S.K.
- 1999-2000: Libertas Trogylos Basket
- 2000-2001: Galatasaray S.K.
- 2001-2002: CJM Bourges Basket
- 2002-2009: AZS Poznań

Reda Aleliūnaitė-Jankovska (born 24 January 1973) is a former Soviet and Lithuanian female professional basketball player.
