= Miloš Pađen =

Serbian professional basketball coach (born 1981)

Crvena zvezda
- Position: Assistant coach
- League: Basketball League of Serbia; EuroLeague Women

Personal information
- Born: January 31, 1981 (age 45) SFR Yugoslavia
- Coaching career: 2002–present

Career history

Coaching
- 2002–2009: KK Radnički Ratkovo (Assistant Coach)
- 2009–2013: ŽKK Partizan Galenika (Assistant Coach)
- 2013–2014: ŽKK Radivoj Korać (Assistant Coach)
- 2014–2016: Lyon Basket (Assistant Coach)
- 2015–2021: Serbia (Assistant Coach)
- 2016–2018: Galatasaray (Assistant Coach)
- 2018–2020: Shanghai Swordfish (Assistant Coach)
- 2020–2023: Shanghai Swordfish
- 2023–2024: Galatasaray
- 2024–2025: Sichuan Yuanda Meile
- 2026–present: Crvena zvezda (Assistant Coach)
Medals
Women's basketball
Head coach for Serbia
Olympic Games
Bronze medal – third place	2016 Rio de Janeiro	Team
EuroBasket Women
Gold medal – first place	2021 France/Spain
Gold medal – first place	2015 Hungary/Romania
Bronze medal – third place	2019 Latvia/Serbia

Miloš Pađen (Serbian Cyrillic: Милош Пађен; born January 31, 1981) is a Serbian professional basketball coach. He currently serves as an assistant coach for Crvena zvezda.

== Club career ==
On 9 October 2023, he has signed with Galatasaray of the Turkish Super League.

In the statement made by Galatasaray on 16 February 2024, it was announced that they parted ways with Pađen.

== Career achievements ==
=== Club competitions ===
As an assistant coach:

- EuroCup champion: 1 (with Galatasaray: 2017–18)

=== National team competitions ===
As an assistant coach:

- 2016 Summer Olympics: Bronze
- EuroBasket Women 2015: Gold
- EuroBasket Women 2021: Gold
- EuroBasket Women 2019: Bronze
