= Yağmur Önal =

Turkish basketball player

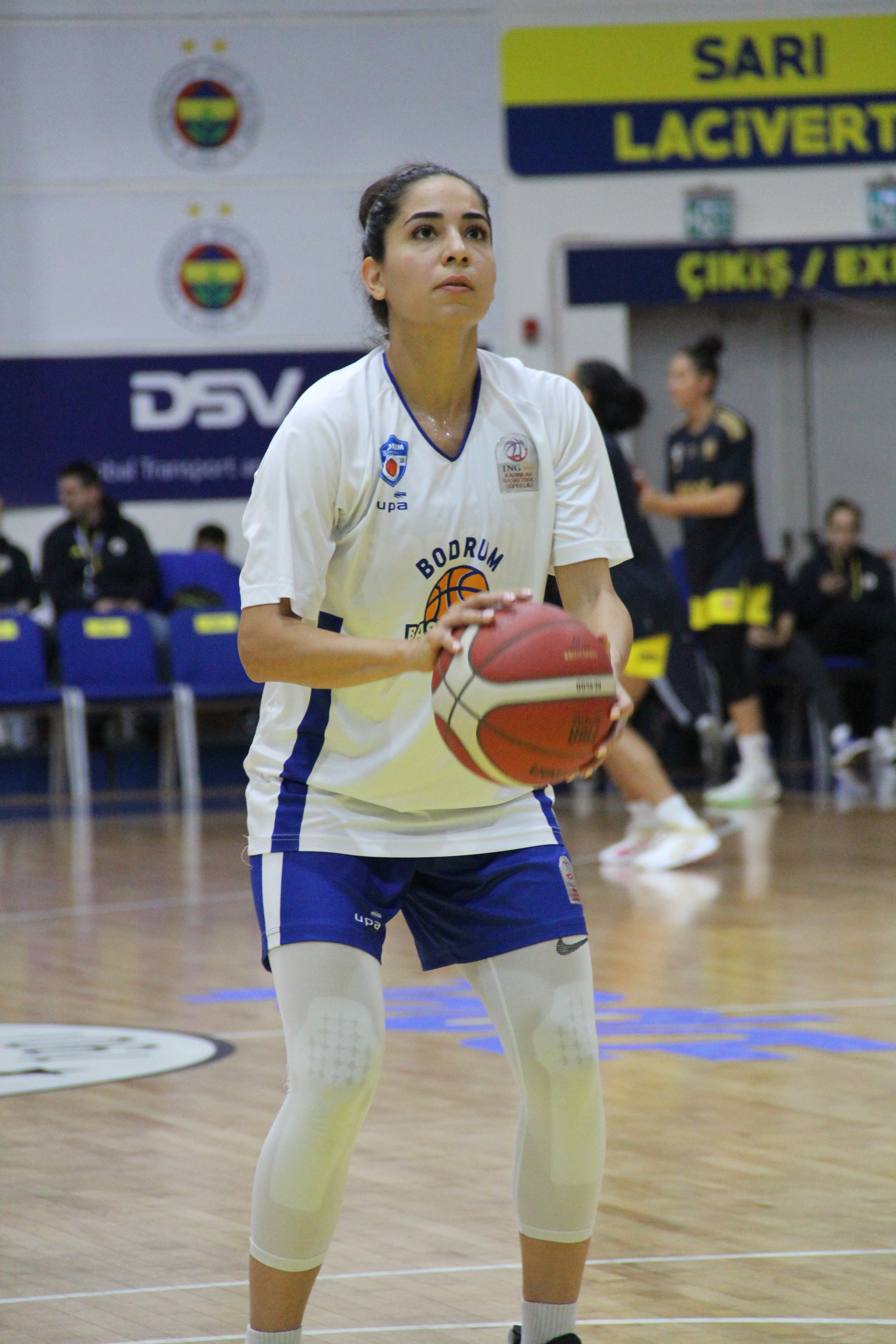
- Taşar in 2024

Bodrum Basketbol Spor Kulübü
- Position: Shooting guard
- League: Turkish Super League

Personal information
- Born: 24 December 1999 (age 26) Gaziosmanpaşa, Istanbul, Turkey
- Listed height: 5 ft 8 in (1.73 m)

Career information
- Playing career: 2016–present

Career history
- 2016–2018: Galatasaray
- 2018–2019: İstanbulgücü
- 2019–2020: Sakarya Yükseliş
- 2020–2021: Urla Belediyesi
- 2021–2022: Mersin Büyükşehir Belediyespor
- 2022–2023: Beşiktaş JK
- 2023–2024: Galatasaray
- 2024–: Bodrum Basketbol Spor Kulübü

Yağmur Önal (née Yağmur Kübra Taşar; born 24 December 1999) is a Turkish basketball player who plays shooting guard.

== Career ==
Önal signed a one-year contract with Beşiktaş on 7 August 2022.

On 27 July 2023, she signed with Galatasaray of the Turkish Women's Basketball Super League (TKBL).

She left the club at the conclusion of the 2024 season, with Galatasaray releasing a farewell message on May 15, 2024, thanking her for her "efforts and dedication" in the yellow and red jersey.
