= Harika Eldaş =

Turkish basketball player (born 1990)

Harika Gözde Eldaş
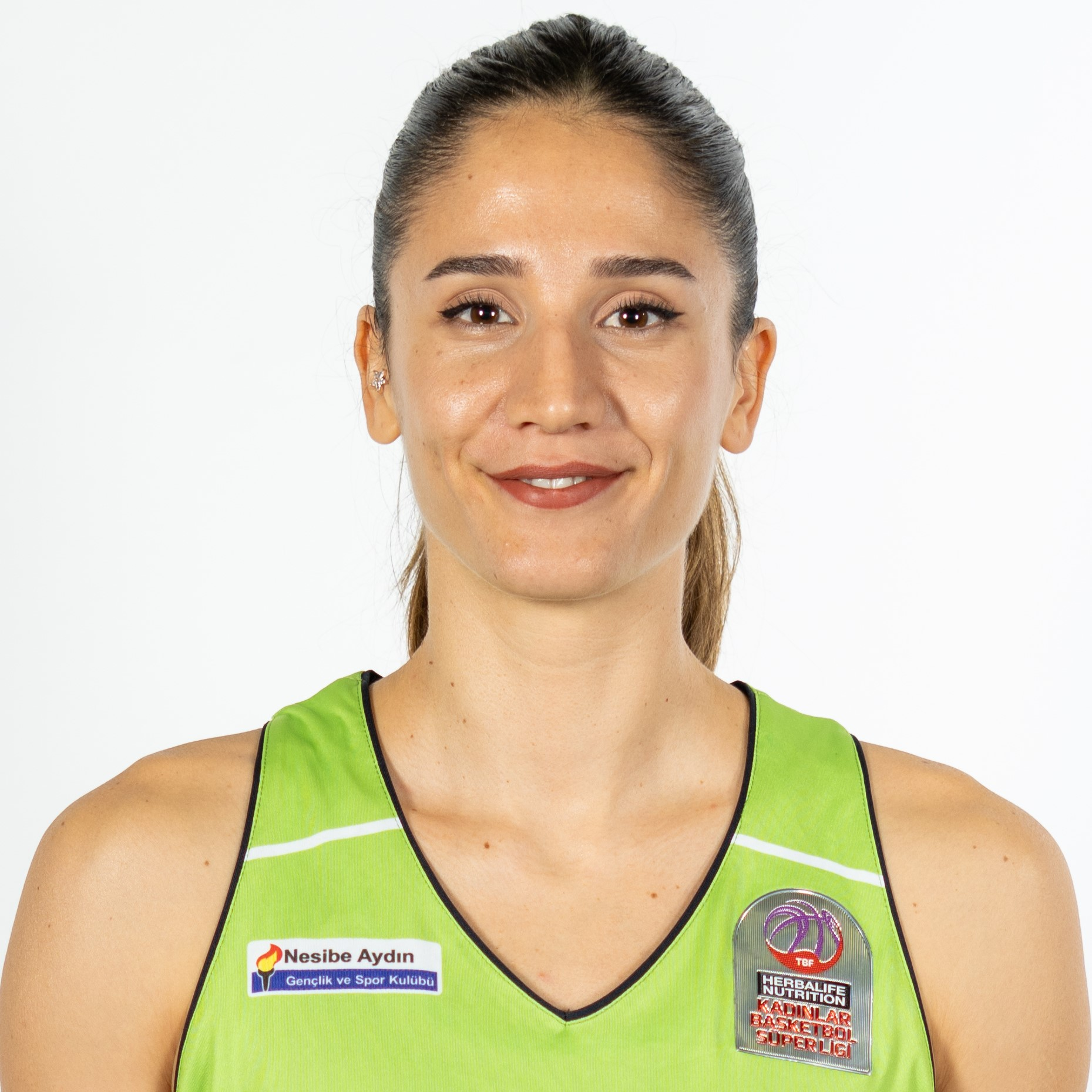
- Portrait

Free agent
- Position: Small forward

Personal information
- Born: 15 May 1990 (age 36) İskenderun, Hatay, Turkey
- Listed height: 6 ft 0 in (1.83 m)
- Listed weight: 181 lb (82 kg)

Career information
- Playing career: 2007–present

Career history
- 2007–2009: Beşiktaş JK
- 2009–2010: Güre Belediyespor
- 2010–2014: TED Ankara Kolejliler
- 2012: → Canik Belediyespor
- 2012–2013: → Antalya Koleji
- 2014–2015: Canik Belediyespor
- 2015–2016: Mersin Basketbol
- 2016: Osmaniye GSK
- 2017: OGM Ormanspor
- 2017–2018: Bodrum Basketbol SK
- 2018–2019: Çankaya Üniversitesi
- 2019: Bursa Büyükşehir Belediyespor
- 2019–2022: Nesibe Aydın GSK
- 2022–2023: Emlak Konut SK
- 2023–2024: Galatasaray

Harika Eldaş (born 15 May 1990) is a Turkish female basketball player. The 1.83 m (6 ft 0 in) national plays Small forward.

== Club career ==
=== Galatasaray ===
On 25 July 2023, she signed with Galatasaray of the Turkish Women's Basketball Super League (TKBL).

Galatasaray bid her farewell on May 15, 2024 in a thank you message for her "efforts and dedication" in the yellow and red jersey as her contract came to an end at the conclusion of the season.
