= 2022–23 Fenerbahçe S.K. (women's basketball) season =

69th season

Fenerbahçe Alagöz Holding
2022–23 season
- President: Ali Koç
- Head coach: Marina Maljković
- Arena: Metro Enerji Sports Hall
- Basketball Super League: 2nd seed
- Playoffs: Winners
- EuroLeague Women: Winners
- Turkish Basketball Cup: Cancelled
- Presidential Cup: Runners-up

The 2022–23 season was Fenerbahçe's 69th season in the existence of the club. The team played in the Basketball Super League, Turkish Basketball Cup and EuroLeague Women.

== Club ==
=== Board of directors ===
Position	Staff
Chairman	(Turkey) Ali Koç
Deputy Chairman	(Turkey) Erol Bilecik
General Secretary	(Turkey) Burak Çağlan Kızılhan
Board Member	(Turkey) Mehmet Dereli
Board Member	(Turkey) Fethi Pekin
Board Member	(Turkey) Acar Sertaç Komsuoğlu
Board Member	(Turkey) Simla Türker Bayazıt
Board Member	(Turkey) Hüseyin Arslan
Board Member	(Turkey) Esin Güral Argat
Board Member	(Turkey) Ahmet Ketenci
Board Member	(Turkey) Mustafa Kemal Danabaş
Board Member	(Turkey) Selma Altay Rodopman
Board Member	(Turkey) Ömer Okan
Board Member	(Turkey) Selahattin Baki
Board Member	(Turkey) Bekir İrdem

Last updated: 14 April 2023
Source: Fenerbahce.org

=== Staff ===
Position	Staff
General Manager	(Turkey) Arzu Özyiğit
Administrative Manager	(Turkey) Derin Yener
Head Coach	(Serbia) Marina Maljković
Assistant Coach	(Serbia) Ljubica Drljača
Assistant Coach	(Turkey) Alper Koç
Assistant Coach	(Turkey) Can Nazlı
Strength and Conditioning Coach	(Turkey) Serhat Türkoğlu
Physiotherapist	(Turkey) Yüsra Baysak
Physiotherapist	(Turkey) Efe Özgümüş
Masseur	(Turkey) İbrahim Koç
Equipment Manager	(Turkey) Latifşah Sarıca

Last updated: 14 September 2022
Source: Fenerbahce.org

== Players ==
=== Squad information ===
Fenerbahçe Alagöz Holding roster
Players
Coaches

Pos.	No.	Nat.	Name	Ht.	Wt.	Age
F	0	(Germany)	Sabally, Satou	1.93 m (6 ft 4 in)	70 kg (154 lb)	25 – 25 April 1998
PF	1	(Turkey)	İstanbulluoğlu, Elif	1.91 m (6 ft 3 in)		18 – 4 April 2005
PF	2	(Turkey)	Gül, Selin Rachel	1.88 m (6 ft 2 in)		19 – 21 December 2003
G/F	3	(Turkey)	Kurtulmuş, Manolya	1.75 m (5 ft 9 in)	60 kg (132 lb)	25 – 1 January 1998
PG	4	(Turkey)	Çakır, Olcay (C)	1.82 m (6 ft 0 in)	60 kg (132 lb)	29 – 13 July 1993
PG	5	(Turkey)	Adıcan, Doğa	1.80 m (5 ft 11 in)	70 kg (154 lb)	22 – 15 February 2001
PF	6	(United States)	Howard, Natasha	1.93 m (6 ft 4 in)	75 kg (165 lb)	31 – 2 September 1991
F	8	(Serbia)	Đorđević, Mina	1.86 m (6 ft 1 in)	73 kg (161 lb)	24 – 23 February 1999
SG	9	(Turkey)	Saçalır, İdil	1.81 m (5 ft 11 in)	64 kg (141 lb)	21 – 4 January 2002
G	10	(Turkey)	Onar, Alperi	1.7 m (5 ft 7 in)	57 kg (126 lb)	27 – 2 January 1996
C	11	(Belgium)	Meesseman, Emma	1.93 m (6 ft 4 in)	87 kg (192 lb)	29 – 13 May 1993
F	14	(Serbia)	Raca, Ivana	1.88 m (6 ft 2 in)		23 – 10 September 1999
G	21	(United States)	McBride, Kayla	1.80 m (5 ft 11 in)	79 kg (174 lb)	30 – 25 June 1992
PG	22	(United States)	Vandersloot, Courtney	1.73 m (5 ft 8 in)	66 kg (146 lb)	34 – 8 February 1989
G/F	23	(Ukraine)	Iagupova, Alina	1.85 m (6 ft 1 in)	75 kg (165 lb)	31 – 9 February 1992
F	30	(United States)	Stewart, Breanna	1.93 m (6 ft 4 in)	77 kg (170 lb)	28 – 27 August 1994
G	36	(Turkey)	Aydın, Merve	1.75 m (5 ft 9 in)	58 kg (128 lb)	29 – 10 March 1994
C	41	(Turkey)	Stokes, Kiah	1.91 m (6 ft 3 in)	87 kg (192 lb)	30 – 30 March 1993

Head coach

- (Serbia) Marina Maljković

Assistant coach(es)

- (Serbia) Ljubica Drljača
- (Turkey) Alper Koç
- (Turkey) Can Nazlı

Team manager

- (Turkey) Arzu Özyiğit

Legend

- (C) Team captain
- (DC) Dual citizenship
- Injured

- Roster

=== Depth chart ===
Pos.	Starting 5	Bench 1	Bench 2	Inactive
C	Emma Meesseman	Kiah Stokes	Natasha Howard
PF	Breanna Stewart	Satou Sabally	Mina Đorđević	Elif İstanbulluoğlu
SF	Alina Iagupova	Manolya Kurtulmuş	Ivana Raca
SG	Kayla McBride	Alperi Onar	Merve Aydın	İdil Saçalır
PG	Courtney Vandersloot	Olcay Çakır	Doğa Adıcan

=== Transactions ===
==== In ====
No.	Pos.	Nat.	Name	Age	Moving from		Date	Source
8	F	(Serbia)	Mina Đorđević	23	Budućnost Podgorica	(Montenegro)	1 July 2022	
36	G	(Turkey)	Merve Aydın	28	Galatasaray	(Turkey)	1 July 2022	
31	PG	(France)	Olivia Époupa	28	BLMA	(France)	1 July 2022	
11	C	(Belgium)	Emma Meesseman	29	Chicago Sky	(United States)	1 July 2022	
30	F	(United States)	Breanna Stewart	27	UMMC Ekaterinburg	(Russia)	1 July 2022	
6	PF	(United States)	Natasha Howard	31	Dynamo Kursk	(Russia)	3 October 2022	
14	F	(Serbia)	Ivana Raca	23	Geas Basket	(Italy)	21 October 2022	
22	PG	(United States)	Courtney Vandersloot	33	UMMC Ekaterinburg	(Russia)	30 January 2023	
15	C	(Turkey)	Gizem Başaran	30	Hatayspor	(Turkey)	3 March 2023	

==== Out ====
No.	Pos.	Nat.	Name	Age	Moving to		Date	Source
1	C	(Sweden)	Amanda Zahui B.	28	Washington Mystics	(United States)	30 June 2022	
11	F/C	(United States)	Elizabeth Williams	29	Washington Mystics	(United States)	30 June 2022	
12	PF	(Turkey)	Tuğçe Canıtez	31	Hatayspor	(Turkey)	30 June 2022	
32	SG	(United States)	Bria Hartley	29	Perfumerías Avenida	(Spain)	30 June 2022	
6	PF	(United States)	Natasha Howard	31	Dynamo Kursk	(Russia)	30 November 2022	
31	PG	(France)	Olivia Époupa	28	Sopron Basket	(Hungary)	24 January 2023	

== Pre-season and friendlies ==
=== Friendly matches ===
22 September 2022 Friendly	Fenerbahçe Holding (Turkish Basketball Federation)	76–61	(Turkish Basketball Federation) Hatayspor	Istanbul
	Scoring by quarter: 20–18, 18–19, 22–16, 16–8
		Boxscore		Arena: Metro Enerji Sports Hall

23 September 2022 Friendly	Fenerbahçe Holding (Turkish Basketball Federation)	77–52	(Turkish Basketball Federation) Beşiktaş	Istanbul
	Scoring by quarter: 15–13, 24–11, 18–20, 20–8
				Arena: Metro Enerji Sports Hall

24 September 2022 Friendly	Fenerbahçe Alagöz Holding (Turkish Basketball Federation)	77–58	(Turkish Basketball Federation) Emlak Konut	Istanbul
	Scoring by quarter: 24–15, 11–21, 25–9, 17–13
		Boxscore		Arena: Metro Enerji Sports Hall

== Overview ==
Competition	First match	Last match	Starting round	Final position	Record							
Competition	First match	Last match	Starting round	Final position	Pld	W	D	L	PF	PA	PD	Win %
Basketball Super League	9 October 2022	25 April 2023	Round 1	Winners	33	30	0	3	2,888	2,101	+787	90.91
EuroLeague Women	26 October 2022	16 April 2023	Round 1	Winners	18	16	0	2	1,549	1,257	+292	88.89
Presidential Cup	28 December 2022		Final	Runnersup	1	0	0	1	78	84	−6	0.00
Total					52	46	0	6	4,515	3,442	+1073	88.46

Source: Competitions

== Competitions ==
=== Presidential Cup ===
28 December 2022	Fenerbahçe Alagöz Holding	78–84	ÇBK Mersin Yenişehir Belediyesi	Ankara
19:00 TRT (UTC+3)	Scoring by quarter: 23–18, 19–21, 14–19, 22–26
	Pts: McBride 26; Rebs: Stokes 9 Asts: Meesseman 7 PIR: McBride 26	Boxscore	Pts: Gray 19; Rebs: Hollingsworth 12; Asts: Gray 9 PIR: Gray 24	Arena: Ankara Arena; Referees: Mehmet Karabilecen, Nazlı Çisil Güngör, Münevver Özemre

=== Basketball Super League ===
==== League table ====
Pos	Team	Pld	W	L	GF	GA	GD	Pts	Qualification or relegation
1	ÇBK Mersin Yenişehir Belediyesi	26	24	2	2041	1662	+379	50	Qualification to playoffs
2	Fenerbahçe Alagöz Holding	26	23	3	2308	1629	+679	49	Qualification to playoffs
3	Galatasaray Çağdaş Faktoring	26	20	6	1991	1712	+279	46	Qualification to playoffs
4	BOTAŞ	26	18	8	1915	1673	+242	44	Qualification to playoffs
5	Emlak Konut	26	16	10	1870	1759	+111	42	Qualification to playoffs
6	Nesibe Aydın	26	15	11	1993	1816	+177	41	Qualification to playoffs
7	Beşiktaş	26	12	14	1838	1887	−49	38	Qualification to playoffs
8	Çankaya Üniversitesi	26	9	17	1852	2030	−178	35	Qualification to playoffs
9	Ormanspor	26	9	17	1859	1999	−140	35	
10	Bursa Uludağ Basketbol	26	8	18	1879	2175	−296	34	
11	Melikgazi Kayseri Basketbol	26	7	19	1780	2089	−309	33	
12	Antalya Toroslar Basketbol	26	7	19	1653	2015	−362	33	
13	Rize Belediyesi	26	6	20	1645	1923	−278	32	Relegation to TKBL
14	Tufan Metalurji Hatay BB (Note: Hatay Büyükşehir Belediyespor withdrew from the league, following the 2023 Turkey–Syria earthquake, and was not relegated at the end of the season.)	26	8	18	1316	1573	−257	34	

Source: TBF

==== Results summary ====
Overall						Home					Away				
Pld	W	L	PF	PA	PD	W	L	PF	PA	PD	W	L	PF	PA	PD
26	23	3	2298	1627	+671	13	0	1100	752	+348	10	3	1198	875	+323

Source: TBF.org.tr

==== Matches ====
Note: All times are TRT (UTC+3) as listed by Turkish Basketball Federation.

9 October 2022 1	Fenerbahçe Alagöz Holding	71–63(OT)	ÇBK Mersin Yenişehir Belediyesi	Istanbul
16:00	Scoring by quarter: 15–28, 19–12, 14–12, 12–8, Overtime: 11–3
	Pts: Onar 17; Rebs: Howard 6 Asts: Iagupova 5 PIR: Onar 16	Boxscore	Pts: Fitik 17; Rebs: Fagbenle 11; Asts: Hayes 5 PIR: Fitik 18	Arena: Metro Enerji Sports Hall; Referees: Ali Serkan Emlek, Uğur Özen, Duhan Köyiçi

15 October 2022 2	Fenerbahçe Alagöz Holding	83–45	Antalya Toroslar BK	Istanbul
16:00	Scoring by quarter: 18–11, 26–8, 19–17, 20–9
	Pts: Howard 22; Rebs: Gül 8 Asts: Iagupova 7 PIR: Howard 25	Boxscore	Pts: Wallace 16; Rebs: Boybeyi 14; Asts: Fitzgerald 4 PIR: Boybeyi 19	Arena: Metro Enerji Sports Hall; Referees: Ahmet Tatlıcı, Dorukhan Kalyoncu, Safa Halit Çakır

23 October 2022 3	BOTAŞ	71–65	Fenerbahçe Alagöz Holding	Ankara
17:00	Scoring by quarter: 18–12, 18–12, 16–20, 19–21
	Pts: Uzun 18; Rebs: Gülcan 7 Asts: Uzun 7 PIR: Uzun 27	Boxscore	Pts: Howard 16; Rebs: four players 6 Asts: Onar 4 PIR: Howard, McBride 12	Arena: Ankara Arena; Referees: Yiğit Gönültaş, Alper Gökçebel, Metin Erol

29 October 2022 4	Fenerbahçe Alagöz Holding	87–83	Emlak Konut	Istanbul
14:00	Scoring by quarter: 30–15, 19–21, 20–27, 18–20
	Pts: McBride 24; Rebs: Stokes, Iagupova 8 Asts: McBride 7 PIR: Stokes 23	Boxscore	Pts: Fields 32; Rebs: Lavender 14; Asts: Lavender 6 PIR: Lavender 32	Arena: Metro Enerji Sports Hall; Referees: Ziya Özorhon, Eyyüp Ayhan, Fatma Öztürk

6 November 2022 5	Bursa Uludağ BK	62–98	Fenerbahçe Alagöz Holding	Bursa
14:00	Scoring by quarter: 16–33, 17–33, 19–21, 10–11
	Pts: Cannon 20; Rebs: Cannon 8 Asts: Cannon, Davis 4 PIR: Cannon 27	Boxscore	Pts: McBride 26; Rebs: Howard 11; Asts: Époupa 9 PIR: McBride 36	Arena: Tofaş Nilüfer Spor Salonu; Referees: Tolga Edis, Münevver Özemre, Ömer Sarı

12 November 2022 6	Fenerbahçe Alagöz Holding	97–53	Melikgazi Kayseri Basketbol	Istanbul
14:00	Scoring by quarter: 26–12, 25–17, 24–21, 22–3
	Pts: McBride 27; Rebs: Howard 10; Asts: Çakır 10; PIR: Howard 27	Boxscore	Pts: Weaver 22; Rebs: Hayes 13; Asts: Albayrak, Sönmez 4 PIR: Hayes 17	Arena: Metro Enerji Sports Hall; Referees: Semih Vural, Dorukhan Kalyoncu, Hakan Gerey

19 November 2022 7	Nesibe Aydın	77–75	Fenerbahçe Alagöz Holding	Ankara
13:00	Scoring by quarter: 29–21, 20–15, 17–18, 11–21
	Pts: Thomas 24; Rebs: Güner 10; Asts: Thomas 4 PIR: Akalan 22	Boxscore	Pts: McBride 28; Rebs: Meesseman 12; Asts: Çakır 7 PIR: McBride 31	Arena: TOBB Sport Hall; Referees: Musa Kazım Çetin, Sertan Kırklar, Sabri Gündüz

1 December 2022 8	Fenerbahçe Alagöz Holding	80–72	Galatasaray	Istanbul
19:00	Scoring by quarter: 28–16, 14–13, 14–15, 24–28
	Pts: McBride 20; Rebs: McBride 7 Asts: Çakır 7 PIR: Meesseman 24	Boxscore	Pts: McCowan 26; Rebs: McCowan 16; Asts: Bilgiç 6 PIR: McCowan 28	Arena: Metro Enerji Sports Hall; Referees: Serhat Büker, Kerem Yılmaz, Furkan Keseratar

4 December 2022 9	Çankaya Üniversitesi	61–87	Fenerbahçe Alagöz Holding	Ankara
14:00	Scoring by quarter: 21–24, 16–21, 13–20, 11–22
	Pts: Harris 18; Rebs: Egbo, Yalçınkaya 8 Asts: Harris 8 PIR: Harris 21	Boxscore	Pts: Meesseman 26; Rebs: Meesseman 13; Asts: Meesseman, Iagupova 5 PIR: Meesseman 43	Arena: Ankara Arena; Referees: Kerem Baki, Anıl Veziroğlu, Sezer Bor

10 December 2022 10	Fenerbahçe Alagöz Holding	92–57	Beşiktaş	Istanbul
14:00	Scoring by quarter: 19–16, 25–12, 23–20, 25–9
	Pts: Howard 22; Rebs: Howard 8 Asts: Çakır 12; PIR: Çakır 33	Boxscore	Pts: Evans 22; Rebs: Billings 11; Asts: Evans 5 PIR: Billings 17	Arena: Metro Enerji Sports Hall; Referees: Sinem Tetik Albayrak, Eyyüp Ayhan, Metehan Alaçam

17 December 2022 11	Tufan Metalurji Hatay BB	75–110	Fenerbahçe Alagöz Holding	Hatay
13:00	Scoring by quarter: 24–15, 6–35, 21–28, 24–32
	Pts: E. Prince 24; Rebs: A. Prince 10; Asts: A. Prince 5 PIR: E. Prince 20	Boxscore	Pts: McBride 20; Rebs: Howard 12; Asts: Onar 8 PIR: Howard, McBride 22	Arena: Hatay Merkez Spor Salonu; Referees: İsmail Binbir, Ahmet Murat Arıkanlı, Ali Osman Kanık

24 December 2022 12	Fenerbahçe Alagöz Holding	98–50	Rize Belediyespor	Istanbul
14:00	Scoring by quarter: 31–14, 28–13, 20–11, 19–12
	Pts: McBride 24; Rebs: Meesseman, Stokes 9 Asts: Iagupova 8 PIR: Meesseman 31	Boxscore	Pts: Benson 23; Rebs: Benson 8 Asts: Topçu 4 PIR: Benson 22	Arena: Metro Enerji Sports Hall; Referees: Göksun Öz, Yarkın Keskin, Metin Erol

30 December 2022 13	Ormanspor	72–100	Fenerbahçe Alagöz Holding	Ankara
14:00	Scoring by quarter: 6–24, 32–22, 21–35, 13–19
	Pts: Gray 30; Rebs: Gray 8 Asts: Karakaş 8 PIR: Gray 23	Boxscore	Pts: McBride 25; Rebs: McBride, Stokes 8 Asts: Iagupova 7 PIR: McBride 28	Arena: M. Sait Zarifoğlu Spor Salonu; Referees: Polat Parlak, Nihat Çetin, Umut Memiş

7 January 2023 14	ÇBK Mersin Yenişehir Belediyesi	77–68	Fenerbahçe Alagöz Holding	Mersin
16:00	Scoring by quarter: 20–18, 21–23, 16–14, 20–13
	Pts: Gray 20; Rebs: Hollingsworth 15; Asts: Gray 7 PIR: Hayes 24	Boxscore	Pts: Stewart 22; Rebs: Stewart, Meesseman 7 Asts: Çakır 10; PIR: Çakır 20	Arena: Servet Tazegül Arena; Referees: Murat Ciner, Orkun Yurttaş, Halil Erkoç

13 January 2023 15	Antalya Toroslar BK	69–106	Fenerbahçe Alagöz Holding	Antalya
14:30	Scoring by quarter: 23–33, 16–36, 15–23, 15–14
	Pts: Fitzgerald 24; Rebs: Hillsman 13; Asts: Fitzgerald 4 PIR: Fitzgerald 25	Boxscore	Pts: Sabally 31; Rebs: Sabally 7 Asts: Çakır 7 PIR: Sabally 40	Arena: Turgut Özal Spor Salonu; Referees: Ali Şakacı, Hakan Gerey, Almina Kocabaş

21 January 2023 16	Fenerbahçe Alagöz Holding	88–64	BOTAŞ	Istanbul
14:00	Scoring by quarter: 28–14, 26–19, 22–13, 12–18
	Pts: McBride 23; Rebs: Stewart 10; Asts: Çakır 8 PIR: Stewart 35	Boxscore	Pts: Angelyn 20; Rebs: Angelyn 11; Asts: Uzun, Doyle 5 PIR: Angelyn 29	Arena: Metro Enerji Sports Hall; Referees: Seher Ayşe Nur Yazıcıoğlu, Burak Durmuş, Ramazan Sezer Baran

28 January 2023 17	Emlak Konut	69–99	Fenerbahçe Alagöz Holding	Istanbul
15:00	Scoring by quarter: 13–26, 23–27, 13–32, 20–14
	Pts: Fields 14; Rebs: Lavender 7 Asts: Lavender 4 PIR: Fields 15	Boxscore	Pts: Stewart 28; Rebs: Stewart 9 Asts: Iagupova 14; PIR: Iagupova 36	Arena: Başakşehir Spor Kompleksi; Referees: Özlem Yalman, Benhür İrcel, Metehan Alaçam

3 February 2023 18	Fenerbahçe Alagöz Holding	101–74	Bursa Uludağ BK	Istanbul
13:00	Scoring by quarter: 24–20, 27–19, 25–19, 25–16
	Pts: Iagupova 29; Rebs: Iagupova 9 Asts: Iagupova 10; PIR: Iagupova 48	Boxscore	Pts: Carter 24; Rebs: Fluker 14; Asts: Carter 8 PIR: Fluker 25	Arena: Metro Enerji Sports Hall; Referees: Sinem Tetik Akbayrak, Eyyüp Ayhan, Umut Memiş

4 March 2023 19	Melikgazi Kayseri Basketbol	56–110	Fenerbahçe Alagöz Holding	Kayseri
16:00	Scoring by quarter: 11–31, 17–25, 11–23, 17–31
	Pts: Landrum 13; Rebs: Yalçın 5 Asts: Sönmez 4 PIR: Weaver 11	Boxscore	Pts: Sabally 28; Rebs: Iagupova 7 Asts: Onar 5 PIR: Sabally 28	Arena: Kadir Has Spor Salonu; Referees: Umut Özgün Ergün, Mehmet Burak Anlatıcı, Almina Kocabaş

6 March 2023 20	Fenerbahçe Alagöz Holding	82–81	Nesibe Aydın	Istanbul
14:00	Scoring by quarter: 27–22, 23–21, 21–25, 11–13
	Pts: Sabally 27; Rebs: Stewart 9 Asts: Iagupova 6 PIR: Sabally 25	Boxscore	Pts: Güner 18; Rebs: Nelson, Özen 6 Asts: Thomas 6 PIR: Güner 16	Arena: Metro Enerji Sports Hall; Referees: Kaan Büyükçil, Dorukhan Kalyoncu, Metehan Alaçam

9 March 2023 21	Galatasaray	62–80	Fenerbahçe Alagöz Holding	Istanbul
18:00	Scoring by quarter: 24–25, 12–15, 15–21, 11–19
	Pts: Nacickaite 18; Rebs: McCowan 12; Asts: Bilgiç 6 PIR: McCowan 24	Boxscore	Pts: Onar 22; Rebs: Stewart 10; Asts: Çakır 8 PIR: Onar 26	Arena: Ahmet Cömert Spor Salonu; Referees: Fatih Arslanoğlu, Turgut Işık, Alper Gökçebel

20 March 2023 22	Beşiktaş	72–90	Fenerbahçe Alagöz Holding	Istanbul
19:00	Scoring by quarter: 23–23, 20–22, 9–24, 20–21
	Pts: Evans 28; Rebs: Bayram 14; Asts: Evans 7 PIR: Bayram 27	Boxscore	Pts: Sabally 28; Rebs: Sabally 13; Asts: Vandersloot 12; PIR: Vandersloot 38	Arena: Akatlar Arena; Referees: Semih Vural, Uğur Akyıldız, Fatma Öztürk

22 March 2023 23	Fenerbahçe Alagöz Holding	105–44	Çankaya Üniversitesi	Istanbul
14:00	Scoring by quarter: 28–9, 34–7, 26–8, 17–20
	Pts: Kurtulmuş 16; Rebs: İstanbulluoğlu 12; Asts: Iagupova 8 PIR: Kurtulmuş 18	Boxscore	Pts: Oral 15; Rebs: Yalçınkaya 10; Asts: White, Türk 2 PIR: Oral 14	Arena: Metro Enerji Sports Hall; Referees: Çağlar Özkan, Cemil Uygül, Mehmet Burak Anlatıcı

24 March 2023 24	Fenerbahçe Alagöz Holding	20–0	Tufan Metalurji Hatay BB	Istanbul
		Boxscore		Arena: Metro Enerji Sports Hall

28 March 2023 25	Rize Belediyespor	54–110	Fenerbahçe Alagöz Holding	Rize
14:00	Scoring by quarter: 6–31, 19–22, 15–35, 14–22
	Pts: Brown 16; Rebs: Marie 11; Asts: Morgan 4 PIR: Brown 13	Boxscore	Pts: Stewart 22; Rebs: Stokes 14; Asts: Aydın, Vandersloot 5 PIR: Stewart 30	Arena: Rize Sports Hall; Referees: Alper Özgök, Nihat Çetin, Almina Kocabaş

30 March 2023 26	Fenerbahçe Alagöz Holding	106–66	Ormanspor	Istanbul
17:00	Scoring by quarter: 23–18, 28–18, 30–17, 25–13
	Pts: Meesseman 28; Rebs: Meesseman 12; Asts: Iagupova 8 PIR: Meesseman 43	Boxscore	Pts: Gray 25; Rebs: Özelçi 7 Asts: Erat 8 PIR: Gray 24	Arena: Metro Enerji Sports Hall; Referees: Mehmet Serdar Ünal, Münevver Özemre, Sabri Gündüz

==== Quarterfinals ====
1 April 2023 1	Fenerbahçe Alagöz Holding	90–70	Beşiktaş	Istanbul
13:00	Scoring by quarter: 27–14, 13–14, 25–20, 25–22
	Pts: McBride 25; Rebs: Stokes 17; Asts: Vandersloot 14; PIR: McBride 29	Boxscore	Pts: Evans 24; Rebs: Bayram 13; Asts: Evans 12; PIR: Evans 20	Arena: Metro Enerji Sports Hall; Referees: Polat Parlak, Yücel Çilingir, Seda Esen

3 April 2023 2	Beşiktaş	64–79	Fenerbahçe Alagöz Holding	Istanbul
19:00	Scoring by quarter: 16–16, 25–20, 15–21, 8–22
	Pts: Evans 27; Rebs: Bayram 12; Asts: Uzunoğlu 4 PIR: Billings 19	Boxscore	Pts: Stewart 26; Rebs: Stokes 15; Asts: Vandersloot 9 PIR: Stewart 24	Arena: Akatlar Arena; Referees: Özlem Yalman, Abdullah Koputan, Sezer Bor

==== Semifinals ====
18 April 2023 1	Fenerbahçe Alagöz Holding	84–60	Galatasaray	Istanbul
20:00	Scoring by quarter: 22–20, 23–22, 22–10, 17–8
	Pts: McBride 27; Rebs: Meesseman 9 Asts: Meesseman 9 PIR: McBride 34	Boxscore	Pts: McCowan 20; Rebs: McCowan 12; Asts: Prince 6 PIR: McCowan 28	Arena: Metro Enerji Sports Hall; Referees: Mehmet Şahin, Aydın Karaçam, Kerem Yılmaz

20 April 2023 2	Galatasaray	78–87	Fenerbahçe Alagöz Holding	Istanbul
20:00	Scoring by quarter: 18–19, 25–22, 22–22, 13–24
	Pts: McCowan 27; Rebs: McCowan 12; Asts: Yıldızhan 7 PIR: McCowan 31	Boxscore	Pts: Meesseman 26; Rebs: Meesseman 7 Asts: Meesseman, Çakır 8 PIR: Meesseman 32	Arena: Ahmet Cömert Spor Salonu; Referees: Emin Moğulkoç, Uğur Özen, Nazlı Çisil Güngör

==== Finals ====
22 April 2023 1	ÇBK Mersin Yenişehir Belediyesi	68–75	Fenerbahçe Alagöz Holding	Mersin
19:00	Scoring by quarter: 21–20, 16–21, 19–19, 12–15
	Pts: Gray 25; Rebs: Williams 11; Asts: Gray 5 PIR: Gray 22	Boxscore	Pts: Meesseman 19; Rebs: Stewart 13; Asts: McBride, Çakır 5 PIR: Stewart 21	Arena: Servet Tazegül Arena; Referees: Can Mavisu, Ziya Özorhon, Tolga Akkuşoğlu

23 April 2023 2	ÇBK Mersin Yenişehir Belediyesi	76–83	Fenerbahçe Alagöz Holding	Mersin
18:00	Scoring by quarter: 22–23, 19–19, 11–23, 24–18
	Pts: Gray 15; Rebs: Williams, Fitik 5 Asts: Gray 9 PIR: Williams 19	Boxscore	Pts: Stewart 26; Rebs: Meesseman 10; Asts: Çakır 6 PIR: Stewart 29	Arena: Servet Tazegül Arena; Referees: Kerem Baki, Alper Altuğ Köselerli, Orkun Yurttaş

25 April 2023 3	Fenerbahçe Alagöz Holding	82–56	ÇBK Mersin Yenişehir Belediyesi	Istanbul
19:00	Scoring by quarter: 24–19, 20–10, 17–17, 21–10
	Pts: Sabally 23; Rebs: Stewart 18; Asts: three players 6 PIR: Meesseman 33	Boxscore	Pts: Williams 16; Rebs: Williams 7 Asts: Yalçın, Yavaş 5 PIR: Williams 21	Arena: Metro Enerji Sports Hall; Referees: Aytuğ Ekti, Mehmet Karabilecen, Turgut Işık

=== EuroLeague Women ===
==== Regular season ====
===== Group A =====
Pos	Team	Pld	W	L	PF	PA	PD	Pts	Qualification
1	(Turkey) Fenerbahçe	14	12	2	1209	1003	+206	26	Advance to quarterfinals
2	(Czech Republic) ZVVZ USK Praha	14	10	4	1119	935	+184	24	Advance to quarterfinals
3	(Spain) Valencia Basket	14	9	5	998	972	+26	23	Advance to quarterfinals
4	(France) Tango Bourges Basket	14	8	6	996	969	+27	22	Advance to quarterfinals
5	(Poland) BC Polkowice	14	8	6	1030	1039	−9	22	
6	(Italy) Virtus Segafredo Bologna	14	5	9	1031	1036	−5	19	
7	(Hungary) KSC Szekszárd	14	3	11	947	1170	−223	17	
8	(Greece) Olympiacos	14	1	13	915	1121	−206	15	

Source: FIBA
Rules for classification: 1) Points; 2) Points difference; 3) Points scored.

===== Results summary =====
Overall						Home					Away				
Pld	W	L	PF	PA	PD	W	L	PF	PA	PD	W	L	PF	PA	PD
14	12	2	1209	1003	+206	7	0	650	491	+159	5	2	559	512	+47

Source: EuroLeague Women

==== Matches ====
26 October 2022 1	BC Polkowice (Polish Basketball Federation)	73–46	(Turkish Basketball Federation) Fenerbahçe Alagöz Holding	Polkowice
19:00 CEST (UTC+2)	Scoring by quarter: 17–17, 20–11, 16–10, 20–8
	Pts: Mavunga 23; Rebs: Mavunga 21; Asts: Gajda 7 PIR: Mavunga 37	Boxscore	Pts: Howard 15; Rebs: Stokes 12; Asts: Époupa 5 PIR: Stokes 21	Arena: City Sports Hall Polkowice; Attendance: 666; Referees: Cecília Montgomery-Tóth, Amalia Marchiş, Veronika Vávrová

2 November 2022 2	KSC Szekszárd (Hungarian Basketball Federation)	103–101(OT)	(Turkish Basketball Federation) Fenerbahçe Alagöz Holding	Szekszárd
18:00 CET (UTC+1)	Scoring by quarter: 21–24, 24–23, 23–17, 19–23, Overtime: 16–14
	Pts: Goree 30; Rebs: Hebard 12; Asts: Studer 9 PIR: Goree 32	Boxscore	Pts: Howard, McBride 28; Rebs: Howard 10; Asts: Époupa 9 PIR: Howard 32	Arena: Szekszard Varosi Sportcsarnok; Attendance: 1,000; Referees: Amal Dahra, Yasmina Alcaraz, Suzana Vujičić

9 November 2022 3	Fenerbahçe Alagöz Holding (Turkish Basketball Federation)	95–89	(Hellenic Basketball Federation) Olympiacos	Istanbul
19:00 TRT (UTC+3)	Scoring by quarter: 26–17, 29–19, 24–24, 16–29
	Pts: Howard 23; Rebs: Stokes 8 Asts: Çakır, Époupa 6 PIR: Howard 25	Boxscore	Pts: Gustafson 30; Rebs: Gustafson 10; Asts: Ayuso 11; PIR: Gustafson 38	Arena: Metro Enerji Sports Hall; Attendance: 429; Referees: Zoran Mitrovski, Gellert Kapitany, Nemanja Ninković

15 November 2022 4	Virtus Segafredo Bologna (Italian Basketball Federation)	67–85	(Turkish Basketball Federation) Fenerbahçe Alagöz Holding	Bologna
20:30 CET (UTC+1)	Scoring by quarter: 15–20, 17–17, 17–24, 18–24
	Pts: Zandalasini 18; Rebs: Rupert 10; Asts: Zandalasini 6 PIR: Rupert 24	Boxscore	Pts: Meesseman 20; Rebs: Meesseman, Stokes 7 Asts: Çakır 8 PIR: Meesseman 28	Arena: PalaDozza; Attendance: 568; Referees: Esperanza Mendoza, Ewa Matuszewska, Amalia Marchiş

7 December 2022 5	Fenerbahçe Alagöz Holding (Turkish Basketball Federation)	82–72(OT)	(Czech Basketball Federation) ZVVZ USK Praha	Istanbul
19:00 TRT (UTC+3)	Scoring by quarter: 18–23, 24–21, 9–11, 18–14, Overtime: 13–3
	Pts: Iagupova 25; Rebs: Howard 8 Asts: Meesseman, Époupa 6 PIR: Iagupova 26	Boxscore	Pts: Jones 23; Rebs: Thomas 13; Asts: Oblak 6 PIR: Jones 31	Arena: Metro Enerji Sports Hall; Attendance: 538; Referees: Jelena Tomić, Ciprian Stoica, Alexandra Ioana-Stan

14 December 2022 6	Valencia Basket (Spanish Basketball Federation)	66–72	(Turkish Basketball Federation) Fenerbahçe Alagöz Holding	Valencia
20:00 CET (UTC+1)	Scoring by quarter: 24–24, 8–15, 15–15, 19–18
	Pts: Carrera 17; Rebs: Carrera 6 Asts: Ouvina 6 PIR: Carrera 19	Boxscore	Pts: McBride 20; Rebs: Stokes 12; Asts: McBride 6 PIR: Çakır 17	Arena: Pavelló Municipal Font de Sant Lluís; Attendance: 2,059; Referees: Andrada Csender, Vladimir Jevtović, Carsten Straube

21 December 2022 7	Fenerbahçe Alagöz Holding (Turkish Basketball Federation)	83–64	(French Federation of Basketball) Tango Bourges Basket	Istanbul
19:00 TRT (UTC+3)	Scoring by quarter: 26–17, 21–8, 14–21, 22–18
	Pts: Howard 19; Rebs: Stokes 12; Asts: Onar 5 PIR: Meesseman, Iagupova 20	Boxscore	Pts: Anderson 20; Rebs: Alexander 5 Asts: Michel 7 PIR: Alexander 17	Arena: Metro Enerji Sports Hall; Attendance: 475; Referees: Nikola Perlić, Nataša Dragojević, Nir Meirson

4 January 2023 8	Fenerbahçe Alagöz Holding (Turkish Basketball Federation)	111–61	(Polish Basketball Federation) BC Polkowice	Istanbul
19:00 TRT (UTC+3)	Scoring by quarter: 31–20, 32–15, 22–10, 26–16
	Pts: Meesseman 25; Rebs: Meesseman 7 Asts: Iagupova 8 PIR: Meesseman 31	Boxscore	Pts: Friskovec 16; Rebs: Wheeler 6 Asts: Wheeler 9 PIR: Friskovec 15	Arena: Metro Enerji Sports Hall; Attendance: 485; Referees: Ariadna Chueca, Alexandra Ioana-Stan, Nemanja Ninković

11 January 2023 9	Fenerbahçe Alagöz Holding (Turkish Basketball Federation)	91–71	(Hungarian Basketball Federation) KSC Szekszárd	Istanbul
9:00 TRT (UTC+3)	Scoring by quarter: 21–18, 26–22, 24–14, 20–17
	Pts: Stewart 30; Rebs: Stewart 17; Asts: Çakır 7 PIR: Stewart 41	Boxscore	Pts: Wallace 19; Rebs: Hebard 10; Asts: Studer 6 PIR: Vivians 20	Arena: Metro Enerji Sports Hall; Attendance: 349; Referees: Gintaras Vitkauskas, Tomi Panov, Hrvoje Čavar

18 January 2023 10	Olympiacos (Hellenic Basketball Federation)	58–92	(Turkish Basketball Federation) Fenerbahçe Alagöz Holding	Piraeus
17:30 EET (UTC+2)	Scoring by quarter: 15–25, 10–26, 15–18, 18–23
	Pts: Gustafson 17; Rebs: Gustafson 8 Asts: Ayuso 4 PIR: Gustafson 19	Boxscore	Pts: Stewart 22; Rebs: Meesseman, Sabally 9 Asts: McBride 8 PIR: Stewart 31	Arena: Peace and Friendship Stadium; Attendance: 150; Referees: Viola Györgyi, Josip Jurčević, Amal Dahra

25 January 2023 11	Fenerbahçe Alagöz Holding (Turkish Basketball Federation)	95–73	(Italian Basketball Federation) Virtus Segafredo Bologna	Istanbul
19:00 TRT (UTC+3)	Scoring by quarter: 22–19, 24–13, 21–24, 28–17
	Pts: Meesseman 22; Rebs: Stewart 10; Asts: McBride 7 PIR: Meesseman 31	Boxscore	Pts: Laksa 29; Rebs: Rupert 8 Asts: Zandalasini, Del Pero 4 PIR: Laksa 23	Arena: Metro Enerji Sports Hall; Attendance: 797; Referees: Ofer Manheim, Nataša Dragojević, Nir Meirson

31 January 2023 12	ZVVZ USK Praha (Czech Basketball Federation)	66–73	(Turkish Basketball Federation) Fenerbahçe Alagöz Holding	Prague
19:00 CET (UTC+1)	Scoring by quarter: 21–16, 17–17, 9–19, 19–21
	Pts: Ayayi 23; Rebs: Ayayi 10; Asts: Oblak 8 PIR: Ayayi 24	Boxscore	Pts: Stewart 18; Rebs: McBride, Sabally 6 Asts: Sabally 6 PIR: Sabally 22	Arena: Královka Arena; Attendance: 1,089; Referees: Blaž Zupančič, Vladimir Jevtović, Tijmen Last

22 February 2023 13	Fenerbahçe Alagöz Holding (Turkish Basketball Federation)	93–61	(Spanish Basketball Federation) Valencia Basket	Istanbul
19:00 TRT (UTC+3)	Scoring by quarter: 21–8, 22–13, 23–23, 27–17
	Pts: Sabally 20; Rebs: Sabally 7 Asts: Vandersloot 12; PIR: Vandersloot 24	Boxscore	Pts: Salvadores 19; Rebs: Ouvina 8 Asts: five players 2 PIR: Ouvina, Salvadores 11	Arena: Metro Enerji Sports Hall; Attendance: 590; Referees: Jelena Tomić, Haris Bijedic, Mihkel Männiste

1 March 2023 14	Tango Bourges Basket (French Federation of Basketball)	79–90	(Turkish Basketball Federation) Fenerbahçe Alagöz Holding	Bourges
20:00 CET (UTC+1)	Scoring by quarter: 29–21, 14–25, 12–21, 24–23
	Pts: Alexander 24; Rebs: Alexander 13; Asts: Anderson, Guapo 6 PIR: Alexander 34	Boxscore	Pts: Stewart 18; Rebs: Stewart 11; Asts: Meesseman 7 PIR: Meesseman 26	Arena: Palais des Sports du Prado; Attendance: 4,539; Referees: Viola Györgyi, Gvidas Gedvilas, Gatis Salins

==== Quarterfinal ====
14 March 2023 1	Fenerbahçe Alagöz Holding (Turkish Basketball Federation)	82–62	(Hungarian Basketball Federation) Sopron Basket	Istanbul
19:00 TRT (UTC+3)	Scoring by quarter: 22–19, 18–16, 22–23, 20–4
	Pts: Stewart 20; Rebs: Stewart 10; Asts: Vandersloot 8 PIR: Stewart 24	Boxscore	Pts: Magbegor 17; Rebs: Brooks 8 Asts: Magbegor 5 PIR: Magbegor 21	Arena: Metro Enerji Sports Hall; Attendance: 737; Referees: Petr Hrusa, Jelena Tomić, Stylianos Simeonidis

17 March 2023 2	Sopron Basket (Hungarian Basketball Federation)	62–82	(Turkish Basketball Federation) Fenerbahçe Alagöz Holding	Sopron
18:00 CET (UTC+1)	Scoring by quarter: 19-32, 19-17, 10-16, 14-17
	Pts: Brooks 21; Rebs: Kunek 7 Asts: Turner 7 PIR: Turner 18	Boxscore	Pts: Stewart 25; Rebs: Iagupova, Meesseman 7 Asts: Iagupova 9 PIR: Stewart, Meesseman 26	Arena: Aréna Sopron; Attendance: 1,000; Referees: Gvidas Gedvilas, Goran Sljivic, Petar Pešić

==== Final Four ====
===== Semifinal =====
14 April 2023	Fenerbahçe Alagöz Holding (Turkish Basketball Federation)	77–70	(Italian Basketball Federation) Beretta Famila Schio	Prague
15:00 CEST (UTC+2)	Scoring by quarter: 16–21, 20–19, 25–14, 16–16
	Pts: Stewart 24; Rebs: Stewart 11; Asts: Vandersloot 11; PIR: Stewart 29	Boxscore	Pts: Keys 19; Rebs: Howard 9 Asts: three players 4 PIR: Keys 21	Arena: Královka Arena; Attendance: 2,154; Referees: Viola Györgyi, Gatis Salins,Martin Vulić

===== Final =====
16 April 2023	Fenerbahçe Alagöz Holding (Turkish Basketball Federation)	99–60	(Turkish Basketball Federation) ÇBK Mersin Yenişehir Bld.	Prague
20:00 CEST (UTC+2)	Scoring by quarter: 29–17, 28–7, 20–20, 22–16
	Pts: Stewart 35; Rebs: Meesseman 7 Asts: Vandersloot, McBride 5 PIR: Stewart 36	Boxscore	Pts: four players 10; Rebs: Crvendakić 7 Asts: Gray 6 PIR: Crvendakić 15	Arena: Královka Arena; Attendance: 2,500; Referees: Andris Aunkrogers, Viola Györgyi, Gatis Salins
