= 2023–24 Fenerbahçe S.K. (women's basketball) season =

70th season

Fenerbahçe Alagöz Holding
2023–24 season
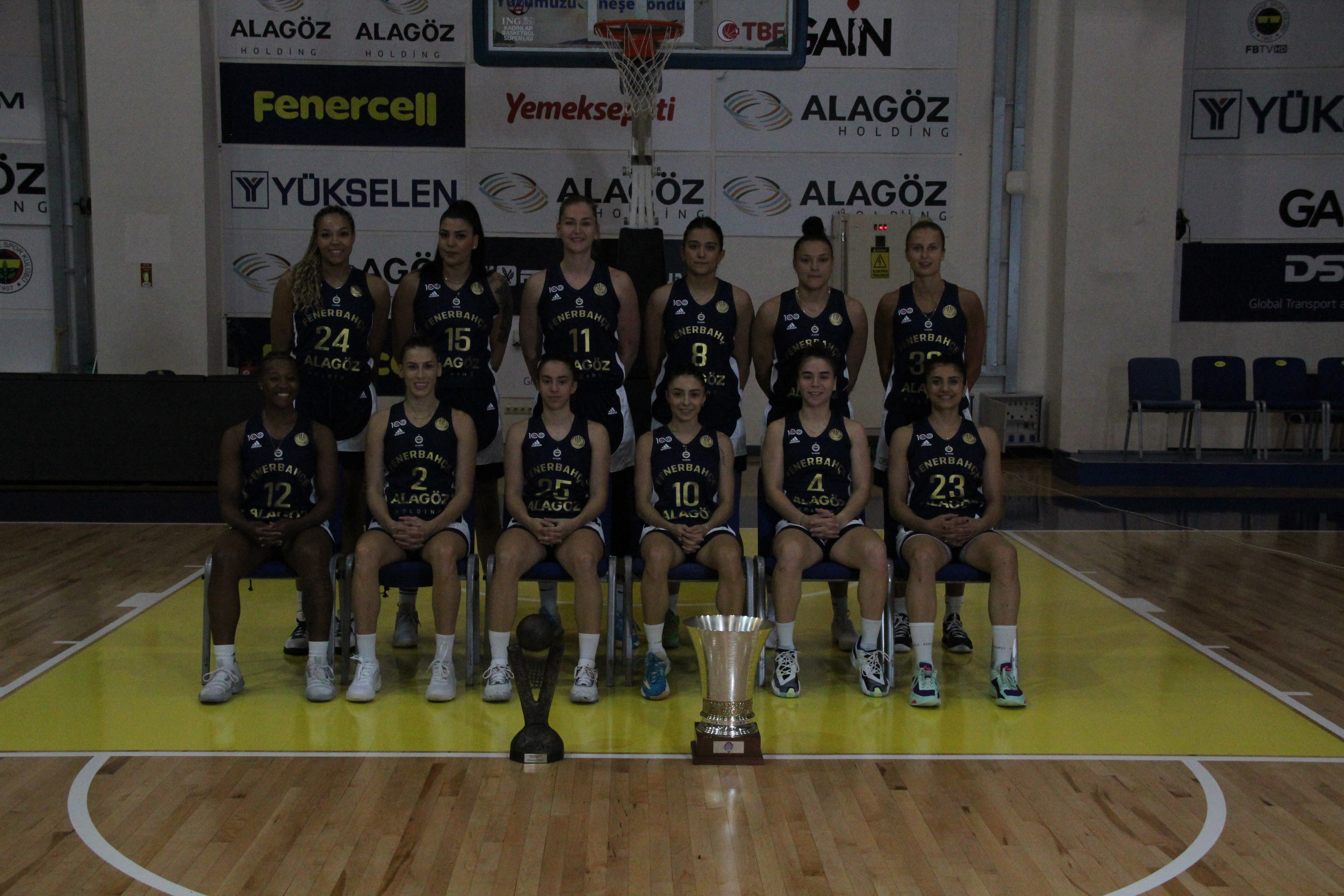
- President: Ali Koç
- Head coach: Valérie Garnier
- Arena: Metro Enerji Sports Hall
- Basketball Super League: 1st seed
- Playoffs: Winners
- EuroLeague Women: Winners
- Turkish Basketball Cup: Winners
- FIBA Europe SuperCup: Winners

The 2023–24 season was Fenerbahçe's 70th season in the existence of the club. The team played in the Basketball Super League, Turkish Basketball Cup and EuroLeague Women.

Fenerbahçe completed the season by winning all competitions in which they participated, achieving a four-for-four record.

== Club ==
=== Board of directors ===
Position	Staff
Chairman	(Turkey) Ali Koç
Deputy Chairman	(Turkey) Erol Bilecik
General Secretary	(Turkey) Burak Çağlan Kızılhan
Board Member	(Turkey) Mehmet Dereli
Board Member	(Turkey) Fethi Pekin
Board Member	(Turkey) Acar Sertaç Komsuoğlu
Board Member	(Turkey) Simla Türker Bayazıt
Board Member	(Turkey) Hüseyin Arslan
Board Member	(Turkey) Esin Güral Argat
Board Member	(Turkey) Ahmet Ketenci
Board Member	(Turkey) Mustafa Kemal Danabaş
Board Member	(Turkey) Selma Altay Rodopman
Board Member	(Turkey) Ömer Okan
Board Member	(Turkey) Selahattin Baki
Board Member	(Turkey) Bekir İrdem

Last updated: 14 April 2023
Source: Fenerbahce.org

=== Staff ===
Position	Staff
General Manager	(Turkey) Nalan Ramazanoğlu
Administrative Manager	(Turkey) Derin Yener
Head Coach	(France) Valérie Garnier
Assistant Coach	(France) Camille Aubert
Assistant Coach	(Turkey) Semih Akdemir
Assistant Coach	(Turkey) Ömer Buharalı
Doctor	(Turkey) Ahmet Kulduk
Strength and Conditioning Coach	(Turkey) Serhat Türkoğlu
Physiotherapist	(Turkey) Ebru Kaplan
Physiotherapist	(Turkey) Efe Özgümüş
Masseur	(Turkey) İbrahim Koç

Last updated: 29 May 2024
Source: Fenerbahce.org

== Players ==
=== Squad information ===
Fenerbahçe Alagöz Holding roster
Players
Coaches

Pos.	No.	Nat.	Name	Ht.	Wt.	Age
PF	1	(Turkey)	Akarpa, Sudenur	1.84 m (6 ft 0 in)		19 – 30 June 2004
SG	2	(Turkey)	Uzun, Sevgi	1.75 m (5 ft 9 in)		26 – 25 November 1997
PG	4	(Turkey)	Özen, Duygu	1.68 m (5 ft 6 in)		23 – 20 March 2001
SG	5	(Turkey)	Adıcan, Doğa	1.80 m (5 ft 11 in)	70 kg (154 lb)	23 – 15 February 2001
PF	6	(United States)	Howard, Natasha	1.88 m (6 ft 2 in)	75 kg (165 lb)	32 – 2 September 1991
PF	8	(Turkey)	Gül, Selin Rachel	1.88 m (6 ft 2 in)		20 – 21 December 2003
F	9	(Turkey)	Saçalır, İdil	1.81 m (5 ft 11 in)	64 kg (141 lb)	22 – 4 January 2002
PG	10	(Turkey)	Onar, Alperi (C)	1.7 m (5 ft 7 in)	57 kg (126 lb)	28 – 2 January 1996
C	11	(Belgium)	Meesseman, Emma	1.93 m (6 ft 4 in)	87 kg (192 lb)	30 – 13 May 1993
PG	12	(Serbia)	Anderson, Yvonne	1.75 m (5 ft 9 in)		34 – 8 March 1990
C	13	(Serbia)	Milić, Nikolina	1.91 m (6 ft 3 in)	82 kg (181 lb)	30 – 12 April 1994
PF	15	(Turkey)	Şenyürek, Tilbe	1.88 m (6 ft 2 in)	86 kg (190 lb)	28 – 26 April 1995
SG	21	(United States)	McBride, Kayla	1.80 m (5 ft 11 in)	79 kg (174 lb)	31 – 25 June 1992
C	22	(France)	Badiane, Marième	1.91 m (6 ft 3 in)		29 – 24 November 1994
PG	23	(Turkey)	Aydın, Merve	1.75 m (5 ft 9 in)	58 kg (128 lb)	30 – 10 March 1994
PF	24	(United States)	Collier, Napheesa	1.85 m (6 ft 1 in)	81 kg (179 lb)	27 – 23 September 1996
PG	25	(Montenegro)	Leković, Marija	1.70 m (5 ft 7 in)		20 – 21 July 2003
PG	30	(Turkey)	Yılmaz, Ayşe	1.71 m (5 ft 7 in)		20 – 13 August 2003
F	33	(Latvia)	Laksa, Kitija	1.85 m (6 ft 1 in)	70 kg (154 lb)	27 – 21 May 1996
C	41	(United States)	Stokes, Kiah	1.91 m (6 ft 3 in)	87 kg (192 lb)	31 – 30 March 1993

Head coach

- (France) Valérie Garnier

Assistant coach(es)

- (France) Camille Aubert
- (Turkey) Ömer Buharalı
- (Turkey) Semih Akdemir

Team manager

- (Turkey) Nalan Ramazanoğlu

Legend

- (C) Team captain
- (DC) Dual citizenship
- Injured

- Roster
Updated: 22 February 2024

=== Depth chart ===
Pos.	Starting 5	Bench 1	Bench 2	Bench 3
C	Emma Meesseman	Nikolina Milić	Marième Badiane	Kiah Stokes
PF	Natasha Howard	Napheesa Collier	Tilbe Şenyürek	Selin Rachel Gül
SF	Kitija Laksa	İdil Saçalır
SG	Kayla McBride	Sevgi Uzun	Doğa Adıcan
PG	Yvonne Anderson	Alperi Onar	Marija Leković	Merve Aydın

=== Transactions ===
==== In ====
No.	Pos.	Nat.	Name	Age	Moving from		Ends	Date	Source
2	PG	(Turkey)	Sevgi Uzun	25	BOTAŞ	(Turkey)	June 2024	26 July 2023	
15	PF	(Turkey)	Tilbe Şenyürek	28	AZS AJP Gorzów Wielkopolski	(Poland)	June 2025	26 July 2023	
12	PG	(United States)	Yvonne Anderson	33	Tango Bourges Basket	(France)	June 2024	26 July 2023	
13	C	(Serbia)	Nikolina Milić	29	Flammes Carolo Basket	(France)	June 2024	26 July 2023	
6	PF	(United States)	Natasha Howard	31	Dynamo Kursk	(Russia)	June 2024	26 July 2023	
25	PG	(Montenegro)	Marija Leković	19	Budućnost Podgorica	(Montenegro)	June 2026	26 July 2023	
33	SF	(Latvia)	Kitija Laksa	26	TTT Rīga	(Latvia)	June 2024	15 August 2023	
20	PF	(United States)	Napheesa Collier	27	Minnesota Lynx	(United States)	June 2024	23 September 2023	
22	C	(France)	Marième Badiane	29	Lattes-Montpellier	(France)	June 2024	17 February 2024	

==== Out ====
No.	Pos.	Nat.	Name	Age	Moving to		Date	Source
41	C	(United States)	Kiah Stokes	30	Las Vegas Aces	(United States)	May 2023	
4	PG	(Turkey)	Olcay Çakır	29	Perfumerías Avenida	(Spain)	11 May 2023	
3	SF	(Turkey)	Manolya Kurtulmuş	25	BOTAŞ	(Turkey)	24 July 2023	
15	C	(Turkey)	Gizem Başaran	30	Beşiktaş	(Turkey)	24 July 2023	
8	PF	(Serbia)	Mina Đorđević	24	Hapoel Rishon Le-Zion	(Israel)	24 July 2023	
14	PF	(Serbia)	Ivana Raca	23	Dinamo Sassari	(Italy)	24 July 2023	
23	SF	(Ukraine)	Alina Iagupova	31	ÇBK Mersin	(Turkey)	24 July 2023	
22	PG	(United States)	Courtney Vandersloot	34	New York Liberty	(United States)	24 July 2023	
0	F	(Germany)	Satou Sabally	25	Shandong Six Stars	(China)	7 October 2023	

== Pre-season and friendlies ==
=== Friendly matches ===
29 August 2023 Friendly	Fenerbahçe Alagöz Holding (Turkish Basketball Federation)	90–52	(Turkish Basketball Federation) Zonguldakspor Basket 67	Istanbul
		Boxscore		Arena: Metro Enerji Sports Hall

4 September 2023 Friendly	Fenerbahçe Alagöz Holding (Turkish Basketball Federation)	86–42	(Turkish Basketball Federation) Emlak Konut	Istanbul
				Arena: Metro Enerji Sports Hall

5 September 2023 Friendly	Fenerbahçe Alagöz Holding (Turkish Basketball Federation)	87–71	(Turkish Basketball Federation) Beşiktaş	Istanbul
				Arena: Metro Enerji Sports Hall

8 September 2023 Friendly	İzmit Belediyespor (Turkish Basketball Federation)	50–78	(Turkish Basketball Federation) Fenerbahçe Alagöz Holding	İzmit
		Boxscore		Arena: Şehit Polis Recep Topaloğlu Spor Salonu

== Overview ==
Competition	First match	Last match	Starting round	Final position	Record							
Competition	First match	Last match	Starting round	Final position	Pld	W	D	L	PF	PA	PD	Win %
Basketball Super League	13 September 2023	17 April 2024	Round 1	Winners	35	35	0	0	3,255	2,318	+937	100.00
EuroLeague Women	4 October 2023	14 April 2024	Round 1	Winners	20	18	0	2	1,564	1,220	+344	90.00
Turkish Cup	2 January 2024	5 January 2024	Quarterfinal	Winners	3	3	0	0	268	219	+49	100.00
FIBA Europe SuperCup	28 September 2023		Final	Winners	1	1	0	0	109	52	+57	100.00
Total					59	57	0	2	5,196	3,809	+1387	96.61

Source: Competitions

== Competitions ==
=== FIBA SuperCup ===
28 September 2023	LDLC ASVEL Féminin (France)	52–109	(Turkey) Fenerbahçe	Lyon
20:00 CEST (UTC+2)	Scoring by quarter: 16–26, 12–25, 10–33, 14–25
	Pts: Chartereau, Ciak 14; Rebs: Camara, Ciak 4 Asts: Fauthoux, Risacher 3 PIR: Ciak 14	Boxscore	Pts: Collier 20; Rebs: Meesseman 13; Asts: Collier, Uzun 5 PIR: Collier 28	Arena: Astroballe; Attendance: 1,006; Referees: Cecília Montgomery-Tóth, Esperanza Mendoza Holgado, Suzana Vujičić

=== Basketball Super League ===
==== League table ====
Pos	Team	Pld	W	L	GF	GA	GD	Pts	Qualification or relegation
1	Fenerbahçe Alagöz Holding	28	28	0	2621	1856	+765	56	Qualification to playoffs
2	Beşiktaş Boa	28	20	8	2389	2096	+293	48	Qualification to playoffs
3	OGM Ormanspor	28	19	9	2250	2154	+96	47	Qualification to playoffs
4	Mehmet Kavan Yapı İzmit Belediyespor	28	19	9	2326	2167	+159	47	Qualification to playoffs
5	Galatasaray Çağdaş Faktoring	28	18	10	2407	2289	+118	46	Qualification to playoffs
6	ÇBK Mersin	28	17	11	2263	1998	+265	45	Qualification to playoffs
7	Nesibe Aydın	28	15	13	2248	2116	+132	43	Qualification to playoffs
8	BOTAŞ	28	14	14	2122	2109	+13	42	Qualification to playoffs
9	Melikgazi Kayseri Basketbol	28	12	16	2352	2314	+38	40	
10	Emlak Konut	28	11	17	2091	2225	−134	39	
11	Antalya Toroslar Basketbol	28	10	18	2220	2435	−215	38	
12	İlkem Yapı Tarsus Spor	28	9	19	2120	2248	−128	37	
13	Bursa Uludağ Basketbol	28	10	18	2076	2252	−176	38	
14	Çankaya Üniversitesi	28	8	20	2315	2602	−287	36	
15	Hatay BB	28	0	28	2023	2962	−939	28	

Source: TBF

==== Results summary ====
Overall						Home					Away				
Pld	W	L	PF	PA	PD	W	L	PF	PA	PD	W	L	PF	PA	PD
28	28	0	2621	1856	+765	14	0	1343	996	+347	14	0	1278	860	+418

Source: TBF.org.tr

==== Results by round ====
Round	1	2	3	4	5	6	7	8	9	10	11	12	13	14	15	16	17	18	19	20	21	22	23	24	25	26	27	28
Ground	A	H	H	A	H	A	H	A	H	A	H	A	H	H	H	A	A	H	A	H	A	H	A	H	A	H	A	H
Result	W	W	W	W	W	W	W	W	W	W	W	W	W	W	W	W	W	W	W	W	W	W	W	W	W	W	W	W
Position	1	1	1	1	1	1	1	1	1	1	1	1	1	1	1	1	1	1	1	1	1	1	1	1	1	1	1	1

Source: TBF.org.tr
A = Away; H = Home; B = Bye; W = Win; L = Loss

==== Matches ====
Note: All times are TRT (UTC+3) as listed by Turkish Basketball Federation.

13 September 2023 1	ÇBK Mersin	0–20	Fenerbahçe Alagöz Holding	Mersin
18:30
		Boxscore		Arena: Servet Tazegül Arena; Referees: Kerem Baki, Orkun Yurttaş, Münevver Özemre
Note: Fenerbahçe were defeated 76–74 by ÇBK Mersin in the game played on 13 September 2023. However, following the match, Fenerbahçe lodged an appeal with the Turkish Basketball Federation, arguing that the Mersin side had violated Article 78.1 of the Turkish Basketball Federation "Regulations on Contracted Basketball Leagues" due to the absence of an under-22 player on the team sheet. Subsequently, at its meeting of 18 September 2023, the TBF Disciplinary Board ruled that, owing to the breach of the relevant provision, ÇBK Mersin would be handed a 20–0 forfeit loss.

17 September 2023 2	Fenerbahçe Alagöz Holding	84–56	Galatasaray	Istanbul
14:00	Scoring by quarter: 22–13, 16–10, 24–19, 22–14
	Pts: Meesseman 25; Rebs: Meesseman 13; Asts: Anderson, Onar 6 PIR: Meesseman 34	Boxscore	Pts: Yıldızhan 17; Rebs: Abdelkader 8 Asts: Abdelkader 4 PIR: Yıldızhan 14	Arena: Metro Enerji Sports Hall; Referees: Ali Serkan Emlek, Alper Gökçebel, Seda Esen

22 September 2023 3	Fenerbahçe Alagöz Holding	98–52	Emlak Konut	Istanbul
18:00	Scoring by quarter: 24–13, 33–12, 22–15, 19–12
	Pts: Meesseman 27; Rebs: Meesseman 9 Asts: Meesseman 7 PIR: Meesseman 43	Boxscore	Pts: Wiese, Başaran 14; Rebs: Başaran 13; Asts: Uca 5 PIR: Başaran 22	Arena: Metro Enerji Sports Hall; Referees: Yener Yılmaz, Furkan Keseratar, Ömer Sarı

1 October 2023 4	İzmit Belediyespor	70–75	Fenerbahçe Alagöz Holding	İzmit
15:30	Scoring by quarter: 24–20, 17–12, 16–20, 13–23
	Pts: Hillsman 22; Rebs: Hillsman, Nared 11; Asts: Özışık 7 PIR: Hillsman 28	Boxscore	Pts: Milić 18; Rebs: Milić 11; Asts: three players 3 PIR: Milić 23	Arena: Şehit Polis Recep Topaloğlu Spor Salonu; Referees: Yiğit Gönültaş, Metehan Alaçam, Mustafa Gürhan Soysal

6 October 2023 5	Fenerbahçe Alagöz Holding	114–48	Hatay Büyükşehir Belediyespor	Istanbul
18:00	Scoring by quarter: 28–20, 32–11, 22–8, 32–9
	Pts: Şenyürek 16; Rebs: Şenyürek 15; Asts: Meesseman 7 PIR: Şenyürek 28	Boxscore	Pts: Tolefree 17; Rebs: Tolefree 6 Asts: Pardee 3 PIR: Tolefree 20	Arena: Metro Enerji Sports Hall; Referees: Polat Parlak, Özkan Talo, Ali Osman Kanık

14 October 2023 6	BOTAŞ	61–93	Fenerbahçe Alagöz Holding	Ankara
17:00	Scoring by quarter: 14–25, 18–17, 12–33, 17–18
	Pts: Weaver 21; Rebs: Reimer 10; Asts: Reimer, Ünal 4 PIR: Weaver 21	Boxscore	Pts: McBride 25; Rebs: Meesseman 12; Asts: Anderson 7 PIR: McBride 34	Arena: Ankara Arena; Referees: Orhan Çağrı Hekimoğlu, Burak Aktaş, Gündoğan Ali Balaban

22 October 2023 7	Fenerbahçe Alagöz Holding	101–65	Bursa Uludağ BK	Istanbul
14:00	Scoring by quarter: 34–16, 23–20, 25–10, 19–19
	Pts: Howard 27; Rebs: Milić 17; Asts: Onar 15; PIR: Milić 38	Boxscore	Pts: Williams 17; Rebs: Poyraz 8 Asts: Şahin, Coulibaly 3 PIR: Poyraz 15	Arena: Metro Enerji Sports Hall; Referees: Tolga Edis, Sezer Bor, Hakan Gerey

28 October 2023 8	Nesibe Aydın	72–94	Fenerbahçe Alagöz Holding	Ankara
16:00	Scoring by quarter: 21–27, 18–21, 14–31, 19–15
	Pts: Thomas 16; Rebs: Cannon 13; Asts: Thomas 7 PIR: Cannon 23	Boxscore	Pts: McBride 22; Rebs: Howard 8 Asts: Uzun 7 PIR: Anderson 20	Arena: TOBB Sport Hall; Referees: Can Mavisu, Münevver Özemre, Ali Osman Kanık

3 November 2023 9	Fenerbahçe Alagöz Holding	100–79	Tarsus Belediyesi	Istanbul
17:00	Scoring by quarter: 35–16, 24–20, 23–28, 18–15
	Pts: Milić 22; Rebs: Milić, Şenyürek 8 Asts: Anderson 9 PIR: Milić 29	Boxscore	Pts: Cave 33; Rebs: Cave 12; Asts: Robinson, Bul 5 PIR: Cave 40	Arena: Metro Enerji Sports Hall; Referees: Seher Ayşe Nur Yazıcıoğlu, Mustafa Candemir Tabak, Mustafa Gürhan Soysal

16 November 2023 10	Beşiktaş	62–80	Fenerbahçe Alagöz Holding	Istanbul
19:00	Scoring by quarter: 20–21, 14–29, 21–15, 7–15
	Pts: Nogić 27; Rebs: Bayram 13; Asts: Nogić, Bayram 3 PIR: Li 23	Boxscore	Pts: Anderson 22; Rebs: Howard 11; Asts: Onar 6 PIR: Anderson 34	Arena: Akatlar Arena; Referees: Özlem Yalman, Seda Esen, Uğur Yüksel

19 November 2023 11	Fenerbahçe Alagöz Holding	105–81	Antalya Toroslar BK	Istanbul
16:30	Scoring by quarter: 33–11, 20–20, 28–25, 24–25
	Pts: McBride 24; Rebs: Uzun 6 Asts: Uzun 10; PIR: Meesseman 29	Boxscore	Pts: Henderson 22; Rebs: Kavurmacıoğlu 10; Asts: Kavurmacıoğlu 5 PIR: Henderson 26	Arena: Metro Enerji Sports Hall; Referees: Alper Altuğ Köselerli, Metehan Alaçam, Gündoğan Ali Balaban

25 November 2023 12	Melikgazi Kayseri	68–84	Fenerbahçe Alagöz Holding	Kayseri
16:00	Scoring by quarter: 23–27, 17–22, 19–19, 9–16
	Pts: Richardson, Ellenberg 18; Rebs: Richardson 8 Asts: Ellenberg 4 PIR: Richardson 23	Boxscore	Pts: Howard 20; Rebs: Howard 9 Asts: Onar 7 PIR: Howard 27	Arena: Kadir Has Spor Salonu; Referees: Mehmet Serdar Ünal, Safa Halit Çakır, Batuhan Mert Gül

2 December 2023 13	Fenerbahçe Alagöz Holding	111–79	Çankaya Üniversitesi	Istanbul
14:00	Scoring by quarter: 35–28, 25–16, 31–22, 20–13
	Pts: Howard 25; Rebs: Meesseman 10; Asts: Onar 11; PIR: Meesseman 33	Boxscore	Pts: Pierre-Louis 32; Rebs: Yalçınkaya 9 Asts: Walker, Pierre-Louis 6 PIR: Pierre-Louis 30	Arena: Metro Enerji Sports Hall; Referees: Erhan Gürsel, Ramazan Sezer Baran, Kadir Giray Esen

16 December 2023 14	Fenerbahçe Alagöz Holding	88–62	OGM Ormanspor	Istanbul
14.10	Scoring by quarter: 24–18, 20–17, 28–10, 16–17
	Pts: McBride 23; Rebs: Meesseman 10; Asts: three players 5 PIR: Meesseman 26	Boxscore	Pts: Onyenwere 19; Rebs: Onyenwere 9 Asts: Onyenwere 8 PIR: Onyenwere 15	Arena: Metro Enerji Sports Hall; Referees: Ali Şakacı, Aydın Karaçam, Ali Osman Kanık

23 December 2023 15	Fenerbahçe Alagöz Holding	76–54	ÇBK Mersin	Istanbul
15:00	Scoring by quarter: 18–15, 18–11, 19–15, 21–13
	Pts: Howard 21; Rebs: Howard 12; Asts: three players 5 PIR: Howard 30	Boxscore	Pts: Mabrey 25; Rebs: Williams 6 Asts: Mabrey 3 PIR: Mabrey 25	Arena: Metro Enerji Sports Hall; Referees: Zafer Yılmaz, Önder Yılmaz, Mustafa Çeltiker

27 December 2023 16	Galatasaray	83–103	Fenerbahçe Alagöz Holding	Istanbul
20:00	Scoring by quarter: 16–24, 22–20, 17–31, 28–28
	Pts: Hines-Allen 23; Rebs: Smith 10; Asts: Hines-Allen 8 PIR: Hines-Allen 26	Boxscore	Pts: McBride 30; Rebs: Howard 11; Asts: Uzun 9 PIR: McBride 34	Arena: Ahmet Cömert Spor Salonu; Referees: Kerem Baki, Yücel Çilingir, Fatma Öztürk

30 December 2023 17	Emlak Konut	58–96	Fenerbahçe Alagöz Holding	Istanbul
14:00	Scoring by quarter: 12–32, 21–22, 13–20, 12–22
	Pts: Smith 21; Rebs: Smith 9 Asts: Çidal 5 PIR: Smith 22	Boxscore	Pts: Meesseman 24; Rebs: Şenyürek 8 Asts: Meesseman 8 PIR: Meesseman 38	Arena: Şehit Mustafa Özel Spor Kompleksi; Referees: Hüseyin Çelik, Metehan Alaçam, Nagehan Şeyda Kurden Aktaş

8 January 2024 18	Fenerbahçe Alagöz Holding	98–91	İzmit Belediyespor	Istanbul
15:00	Scoring by quarter: 27–24, 20–26, 30–24, 21–17
	Pts: McBride 26; Rebs: Howard 9 Asts: McBride, Onar 8 PIR: McBride 32	Boxscore	Pts: Nared 29; Rebs: Hillsman 13; Asts: Nared 9 PIR: Hillsman 35	Arena: Metro Enerji Sports Hall; Referees: Orhan Çağrı Hekimoğlu, Sezer Bor, Almina Kocabaş

14 January 2024 19	Hatay Büyükşehir Belediyespor	67–126	Fenerbahçe Alagöz Holding	Hatay
15:30	Scoring by quarter: 12–34, 14–36, 22–26, 19–30
	Pts: Canlıel 23; Rebs: Kutlu, Işık 4 Asts: Canlıel, Işık 5 PIR: Canlıel 20	Boxscore	Pts: Şenyürek 30; Rebs: Şenyürek 18; Asts: Uzun 12; PIR: Şenyürek 46	Arena: Hatay Merkez Spor Salonu; Referees: Batuhan Söylemezoğlu, Benhür İrcel, Mustafa Çeltiker

21 January 2024 20	Fenerbahçe Alagöz Holding	84–82	BOTAŞ	Istanbul
15:00	Scoring by quarter: 20–18, 23–24, 21–12, 20–28
	Pts: Meesseman 22; Rebs: Howard 7 Asts: Anderson 9 PIR: Meesseman 31	Boxscore	Pts: Allen 28; Rebs: Mack 14; Asts: Allen 10; PIR: Allen 29	Arena: Metro Enerji Sports Hall; Referees: Yiğit Gönültaş, Mustafa Candemir Tabak, Sami İrek

27 January 2024 21	Bursa Uludağ BK	77–108	Fenerbahçe Alagöz Holding	Bursa
14:00	Scoring by quarter: 10–31, 27–24, 18–22, 22–31
	Pts: Wallace, Baptiste 20; Rebs: Poyraz 10; Asts: Coulibaly 5 PIR: Coulibaly, Fluker 21	Boxscore	Pts: Collier 24; Rebs: Collier 8 Asts: McBride 9 PIR: Collier 33	Arena: Naim Süleymanoğlu Spor Kompleksi; Referees: Ali Şakacı, Ahmet Murat Arıkanlı, Fatih Erdoğan

2 February 2024 22	Fenerbahçe Alagöz Holding	87–69	Nesibe Aydın	Istanbul
14:00	Scoring by quarter: 21–19, 20–22, 28–15, 18–13
	Pts: Howard 20; Rebs: Howard 11; Asts: McBride 7 PIR: Howard 27	Boxscore	Pts: Cannon 25; Rebs: Cannon 9 Asts: Thomas 8 PIR: Cannon 26	Arena: Metro Enerji Sports Hall; Referees: Murat Ciner, Cemil Uygül, Sezer Bor

15 February 2024 23	Tarsus Belediyesi	54–100	Fenerbahçe Alagöz Holding	Mersin
15:00	Scoring by quarter: 17–29, 16–27, 13–23, 8–21
	Pts: Cave 16; Rebs: Cave 10; Asts: Robinson 7 PIR: Cave 19	Boxscore	Pts: Collier 23; Rebs: Howard 15; Asts: Onar 10; PIR: Howard 30	Arena: Servet Tazegül Arena; Referees: Yener Yılmaz, Sabri Gündüz, Sait Nedim Çelik

18 February 2024 24	Fenerbahçe Alagöz Holding	100–91	Beşiktaş	Istanbul
15:00	Scoring by quarter: 26–29, 29–24, 21–15, 24–23
	Pts: Collier 31; Rebs: Collier 10; Asts: Onar 6 PIR: Collier 38	Boxscore	Pts: Evans 35; Rebs: Li 14; Asts: Evans 7 PIR: Bayram 28	Arena: Metro Enerji Sports Hall; Referees: Alper Gökçebel, Benhür İrcel, Furkan Keseratar

24 February 2024 25	Antalya Toroslar BK	62–85	Fenerbahçe Alagöz Holding	Antalya
15:00	Scoring by quarter: 14–35, 16–17, 16–19, 16–14
	Pts: Brown 15; Rebs: Brown 11; Asts: Henderson 5 PIR: Henderson 14	Boxscore	Pts: Howard 20; Rebs: Howard 17; Asts: Anderson 5 PIR: Howard 22	Arena: Turgut Özal Spor Salonu; Referees: Musa Kazım Çetin, Mustafa Candemir Tabak, Atakan Kaymak

2 March 2024 26	Fenerbahçe Alagöz Holding	97–87	Melikgazi Kayseri	Istanbul
15:00	Scoring by quarter: 31–19, 21–18, 22–24, 23–26
	Pts: McBride 24; Rebs: Collier 10; Asts: Uzun 12; PIR: Collier 27	Boxscore	Pts: Hamby 32; Rebs: Hamby 13; Asts: Günay 7 PIR: Hamby 39	Arena: Metro Enerji Sports Hall; Referees: Tolga Akkuşoğlu, Burak Aktaş, Çağatay Taşkın

9 March 2024 27	Çankaya Üniversitesi	57–117	Fenerbahçe Alagöz Holding	Ankara
14:30	Scoring by quarter: 20–32, 11–32, 15–24, 11–29
	Pts: Walker 18; Rebs: Walker 8 Asts: McCarty 6 PIR: Walker 21	Boxscore	Pts: Howard 29; Rebs: Badiane 14; Asts: Anderson 9 PIR: Howard 40	Arena: Ankara Arena; Referees: Burak Yılmaz, Metin Erol, Umut Memiş

20 March 2024 28	OGM Ormanspor	69–97	Fenerbahçe Alagöz Holding	Ankara
15:00	Scoring by quarter: 16–21, 19–27, 21–27, 13–22
	Pts: Fıtık 19; Rebs: Katanić 8 Asts: Sutton 7 PIR: Sutton 16	Boxscore	Pts: Collier 21; Rebs: Collier 14; Asts: Meesseman 8 PIR: Collier 37	Referees: Ali Serkan Emlek, Ömer Sarı, Burak Durmuş

==== Quarterfinals ====
23 March 2024 1	Fenerbahçe Alagöz Holding	89–56 (Series: 1–0)	BOTAŞ	Istanbul
15:00	Scoring by quarter: 22–17, 28–21, 20–8, 19–10
	Pts: Collier 20; Rebs: Howard 11; Asts: Anderson 8 PIR: Howard 27	Boxscore	Pts: Mack 16; Rebs: Mack, Reimer 9 Asts: Allen 7 PIR: Mack 24	Arena: Metro Enerji Sports Hall; Referees: Kerem Yılmaz, Benhür İrcel, Mustafa Çeltiker

25 March 2024 2	BOTAŞ	73–89 (Series: 0–2)	Fenerbahçe Alagöz Holding	Ankara
17:30	Scoring by quarter: 25–25, 9–21, 17–21, 22–22
	Pts: Weaver 22; Rebs: Mack 15; Asts: Allen 9 PIR: Allen 30	Boxscore	Pts: Collier 22; Rebs: Milić 10; Asts: Uzun 13; PIR: Collier 34	Arena: Ankara Arena; Referees: Can Mavisu, Yiğit Emre Şimşek, Metehan Alaçam

==== Semifinals ====
29 March 2024 1	Fenerbahçe Alagöz Holding	83–66 (Series: 1–0)	Galatasaray	Istanbul
19:00	Scoring by quarter: 22–20, 19–18, 20–7, 22–21
	Pts: Collier 20; Rebs: Collier 14; Asts: Anderson 8 PIR: Collier 29	Boxscore	Pts: Vanloo, Hartley 14; Rebs: Smith 15; Asts: Vanloo 6 PIR: Smith 18	Arena: Metro Enerji Sports Hall; Referees: Ali Serkan Emlek, Turgut Işık, Barış Turgut

2 April 2024 2	Galatasaray	71–109 (Series: 0–2)	Fenerbahçe Alagöz Holding	Istanbul
20:30	Scoring by quarter: 22–27, 16–18, 15–27, 18–37
	Pts: Smith 36; Rebs: McCowan 10; Asts: Vanloo, Hartley 5 PIR: Smith 29	Boxscore	Pts: McBride 21; Rebs: Collier, Milić 10; Asts: Uzun 9 PIR: Collier, McBride 27	Arena: Ahmet Cömert Spor Salonu; Referees: Orhan Çağrı Hekimoğlu, İbrahim Altıntaş, Nihat Çetin

==== Finals ====
5 April 2024 1	Fenerbahçe Alagöz Holding	99–76 (Series: 1–0)	ÇBK Mersin	Istanbul
19:00	Scoring by quarter: 24–15, 28–32, 28–16, 19–13
	Pts: Meesseman 21; Rebs: Howard 7 Asts: McBride 10; PIR: Meesseman 27	Boxscore	Pts: Copper 19; Rebs: Copper 6 Asts: Mabrey 8 PIR: Williams 25	Arena: Metro Enerji Sports Hall; Referees: Can Mavisu, Alper Altuğ Köselerli, Halil Erkoç

7 April 2024 2	Fenerbahçe Alagöz Holding	85–64 (Series: 2–0)	ÇBK Mersin	Istanbul
15:00	Scoring by quarter: 24–18, 11–16, 28–12, 22–18
	Pts: McBride, Howard 22; Rebs: Meesseman 17; Asts: Anderson 8 PIR: Howard, Meesseman 26	Boxscore	Pts: Williams 21; Rebs: Williams 8 Asts: Mabrey 4 PIR: Williams 24	Arena: Metro Enerji Sports Hall; Referees: Mehmet Şahin, Murat Ciner, Önder Yılmaz

17 April 2024 3	ÇBK Mersin	56–80 (Series: 0–3)	Fenerbahçe Alagöz Holding	Mersin
19:30	Scoring by quarter: 17–21, 13–17, 12–24, 14–18
	Pts: Copper 22; Rebs: Williams 13; Asts: Mabrey 6 PIR: Copper 17	Boxscore	Pts: Howard 18; Rebs: Collier 16; Asts: Meesseman 7 PIR: Howard 28	Arena: Servet Tazegül Arena; Referees: Ali Serkan Emlek, Semih Vural, Orkun Yurttaş

=== EuroLeague Women ===
==== Regular season ====
===== Group A =====
Pos	Team	Pld	W	L	PF	PA	PD	Pts	Qualification
1	(Turkey) Fenerbahçe Alagoz Holding	14	12	2	1198	909	+289	26	Advance to quarter-finals
2	(Hungary) DVTK HUN-Therm	14	9	5	927	916	+11	23 (Note: DVTK HUN-Therm 3–1, Casademont Zaragoza 2–2, Beretta Famila Schio 1–3)	Advance to quarter-finals
3	(Spain) Casademont Zaragoza	14	9	5	943	875	+68	23	Advance to quarter-finals
4	(Italy) Beretta Famila Schio	14	9	5	996	951	+45	23	Advance to quarter-finals
5	(Spain) Valencia Basket	14	8	6	991	937	+54	22	
6	(France) LDLC ASVEL Féminin	14	5	9	1021	1079	−58	19	
7	(Romania) ACS Sepsi SIC	14	2	12	923	1108	−185	16 (Note: ACS Sepsi SIC 153–134 AZS UMCS Lublin)	
8	(Poland) AZS UMCS Lublin	14	2	12	806	1030	−224	16	

Source: FIBA
Rules for classification: 1) Points; 2) Points difference; 3) Points scored.

===== Results summary =====
Overall						Home					Away				
Pld	W	L	PF	PA	PD	W	L	PF	PA	PD	W	L	PF	PA	PD
14	12	2	1198	909	+289	7	0	640	447	+193	5	2	558	462	+96

Source: EuroLeague Women

===== Matches =====
4 October 2023 1	Fenerbahçe Alagöz Holding (Turkish Basketball Federation)	96–66	(Spanish Basketball Federation) Valencia Basket	Istanbul
19:00 TRT (UTC+3)	Scoring by quarter: 25–19, 28–14, 21–18, 22–15
	Pts: Collier 17; Rebs: Collier, McBride 6 Asts: Onar 7 PIR: McBride 25	Boxscore	Pts: Fingall 14; Rebs: Guelich 9 Asts: Fingall, Romero 5 PIR: Fingall 19	Arena: Metro Enerji Sports Hall; Attendance: 550; Referees: Amal Dahra, Alexandra Ioana-Stan, Ivana Radinović

11 October 2023 2	Fenerbahçe Alagöz Holding (Turkish Basketball Federation)	106–57	(French Federation of Basketball) LDLC ASVEL Féminin	Istanbul
19:00 TRT (UTC+3)	Scoring by quarter: 31–9, 18–27, 27–14, 30–7
	Pts: Collier 23; Rebs: Collier 8 Asts: three players 5 PIR: Collier 34	Boxscore	Pts: Fauthoux 15; Rebs: Chartereau 5 Asts: Allemand, Miyem 4 PIR: Chartereau 20	Arena: Metro Enerji Sports Hall; Attendance: 500; Referees: Jan Baloun, Kirile Tvauri, Veronika Obertova

18 October 2023 3	Casademont Zaragoza (Spanish Basketball Federation)	71–74	(Turkish Basketball Federation) Fenerbahçe Alagöz Holding	Zaragoza
20:00 CEST (UTC+2)	Scoring by quarter: 19–30, 16–12, 27–15, 9–17
	Pts: Fiebich 16; Rebs: Fiebich 5 Asts: Atkinson 4 PIR: Fiebich 26	Boxscore	Pts: McBride 26; Rebs: Onar, Milić 5 Asts: McBride, Anderson 4 PIR: McBride 29	Arena: Pabellón Príncipe Felipe; Attendance: 3,800; Referees: Nemanja Ninković, Veronika Vávrová, Martin van Hoye

25 October 2023 4	Fenerbahçe Alagöz Holding (Turkish Basketball Federation)	90–64	(Italian Basketball Federation) Beretta Famila Schio	Istanbul
19:00 TRT (UTC+3)	Scoring by quarter: 29–13, 21–21, 19–18, 21–12
	Pts: Meesseman 24; Rebs: Meesseman 9 Asts: Anderson 8 PIR: Meesseman 33	Boxscore	Pts: Guirantes, Parks 12; Rebs: Juhász 9 Asts: Sottana 3 PIR: Guirantes 13	Arena: Metro Enerji Sports Hall; Attendance: 800; Referees: Ariadna Chueca, Viktor Nagy, Branimir Galić

31 October 2023 5	AZS UMCS Lublin (Polish Basketball Federation)	50–85	(Turkish Basketball Federation) Fenerbahçe Alagöz Holding	Lublin
20:00 CET (UTC+1)	Scoring by quarter: 15–15, 11–27, 13–23, 11–20
	Pts: Heal 20; Rebs: Gustavsson 12; Asts: Heal 4 PIR: Heal 21	Boxscore	Pts: Howard, Şenyürek 14; Rebs: Howard 11; Asts: four players 4 PIR: Howard 21	Arena: Hala Mosir; Attendance: 900; Referees: Gintaras Mačiulis, Valerio Grigioni, Petr Hrusa

22 November 2023 6	Fenerbahçe Alagöz Holding (Turkish Basketball Federation)	110–63	(Romanian Basketball Federation) ACS Sepsi SIC	Istanbul
19:00 TRT (UTC+3)	Scoring by quarter: 34–13, 25–11, 31–22, 20–17
	Pts: Milić, McBride 24; Rebs: Meesseman 10; Asts: Uzun 11; PIR: Meesseman 36	Boxscore	Pts: Hristova 18; Rebs: Hristova 5 Asts: Green 7 PIR: Janković 15	Arena: Metro Enerji Sports Hall; Attendance: 450; Referees: Marion Ortis, Ilias Karpanos, Bogna Podkowińska

29 November 2023 7	DVTK HUN-Therm (Hungarian Basketball Federation)	64–81	(Turkish Basketball Federation) Fenerbahçe Alagöz Holding	Miskolc
18:00 CET (UTC+1)	Scoring by quarter: 20–18, 17–29, 16–19, 11–15
	Pts: Aho 17; Rebs: Charles 11; Asts: Lelik 6 PIR: Aho 17	Boxscore	Pts: Howard 22; Rebs: McBride 12; Asts: Meesseman 7 PIR: Howard, Meesseman 26	Arena: DVTK Arena; Attendance: 2,700; Referees: Ariadna Chueca, Veronika Obertova, Jelena Tomić

5 December 2023 8	Valencia Basket (Spanish Basketball Federation)	64–88	(Turkish Basketball Federation) Fenerbahçe Alagöz Holding	Valencia
19:15 CET (UTC+1)	Scoring by quarter: 10–25, 16–22, 23–22, 15–19
	Pts: Fingall 12; Rebs: Casas 7 Asts: Ouvina 5 PIR: Fingall 17	Boxscore	Pts: Meesseman 25; Rebs: Anderson 7 Asts: three players 5 PIR: Meesseman 25	Arena: Pabellón Fuente de San Luis; Attendance: 3,400; Referees: Viola Györgyi, Alexandre Deman, Franko Gracin

12 December 2023 9	LDLC ASVEL Féminin (French Federation of Basketball)	89–81	(Turkish Basketball Federation) Fenerbahçe Alagöz Holding	Villeurbanne
20:00 CET (UTC+1)	Scoring by quarter: 21–25, 24–20, 22–21, 22–15
	Pts: Williams, Chartereau 19; Rebs: Williams 7 Asts: three players 5 PIR: Chartereau 24	Boxscore	Pts: Howard 24; Rebs: Howard 15; Asts: three players 7 PIR: Howard 28	Arena: Astroballe; Attendance: 2,200; Referees: Esperanza Mendoza, Aurimas Borusas, Ewa Matuszewska

20 December 2023 10	Fenerbahçe Alagöz Holding (Turkish Basketball Federation)	71–65	(Spanish Basketball Federation) Casademont Zaragoza	Istanbul
18:00 TRT (UTC+3)	Scoring by quarter: 28–17, 16–13, 14–17, 13–18
	Pts: McBride 23; Rebs: McBride 7 Asts: Uzun 7 PIR: McBride 27	Boxscore	Pts: Fiebich, Atkinson 13; Rebs: Ortiz 6 Asts: Atkinson 6 PIR: Atkinson 22	Arena: Metro Enerji Sports Hall; Attendance: 550; Referees: Ciprian Stoica, Paulina Karolina Gajdosz, Silvia Marziali

11 January 2024 11	Beretta Famila Schio (Italian Basketball Federation)	75–67	(Turkish Basketball Federation) Fenerbahçe Alagöz Holding	Schio
20:00 CET (UTC+1)	Scoring by quarter: 15–17, 11–15, 29–17, 20–18
	Pts: Guirantes 21; Rebs: Keys 9 Asts: Guirantes 5 PIR: Guirantes 20	Boxscore	Pts: Meesseman 18; Rebs: Milić 7 Asts: McBride 5 PIR: Anderson 21	Arena: Palazzetto Livio Romare; Attendance: 1,800; Referees: Josip Jurčević, Blaž Zupančič, Franko Gracin

17 January 2024 12	Fenerbahçe Alagöz Holding (Turkish Basketball Federation)	72–61	(Polish Basketball Federation) AZS UMCS Lublin	Istanbul
19:00 TRT (UTC+3)	Scoring by quarter: 15–18, 26–14, 16–14, 15–15
	Pts: Meesseman 16; Rebs: Meesseman, Howard 11; Asts: Uzun 6 PIR: Meesseman 33	Boxscore	Pts: Goss 16; Rebs: Gustavsson 13; Asts: Owczarzak 8 PIR: Gustavsson 16	Arena: Metro Enerji Sports Hall; Attendance: 450; Referees: Alexandra Ioana-Stan, Veronika Vávrová, Laure Coanus

24 January 2024 13	ACS Sepsi SIC (Romanian Basketball Federation)	49–82	(Turkish Basketball Federation) Fenerbahçe Alagöz Holding	Sfântu Gheorghe
19:00 EET (UTC+2)	Scoring by quarter: 12–20, 15–18, 13–25, 9–19
	Pts: Hristova 16; Rebs: Nyström 9 Asts: Nyström, Green 5 PIR: Green 13	Boxscore	Pts: Collier 21; Rebs: Collier 8 Asts: McBride 5 PIR: Collier 23	Arena: Sepsi Arena; Attendance: 1,800; Referees: Esperanza Mendoza, Amal Dahra, Sandra González Sánchez

30 January 2024 14	Fenerbahçe Alagöz Holding (Turkish Basketball Federation)	95–71	(Hungarian Basketball Federation) DVTK HUN-Therm	Istanbul
19:00 TRT (UTC+3)	Scoring by quarter: 35–16, 20–11, 15–14, 25–30
	Pts: Meesseman 25; Rebs: Meesseman 11; Asts: four players 5 PIR: Meesseman 39	Boxscore	Pts: Lelik 19; Rebs: three players 4 Asts: Kanyasi 5 PIR: Lelik 24	Arena: Metro Enerji Sports Hall; Attendance: 1,200; Referees: Yasmina Alcaraz, Blaz Zupancic, Mihkel Männiste

===== Quarterfinal =====
21 February 2024 1	Fenerbahçe Alagöz Holding (Turkish Basketball Federation)	98–91 (Series: 1–0)	(Spanish Basketball Federation) Perfumerías Avenida	Istanbul
19:00 TRT (UTC+3)	Scoring by quarter: 30–24, 23–20, 24–20, 21–27
	Pts: McBride 27; Rebs: Collier 9 Asts: McBride 8 PIR: McBride 30	Boxscore	Pts: Prince 22; Rebs: Carter 6 Asts: Carter 6 PIR: Vilaro 22	Arena: Metro Enerji Sports Hall; Attendance: 950; Referees: Nikola Perlić, Veronika Obertova, Paulina Karolina Gajdosz

28 February 2024 2	Perfumerías Avenida (Spanish Basketball Federation)	67–73 (Series: 0–2)	(Turkish Basketball Federation) Fenerbahçe Alagöz Holding	Salamanca
20:30 CET (UTC+1)	Scoring by quarter: 19–15, 17–15, 6–22, 25–21
	Pts: Rodríguez, Carter 14; Rebs: Koné 7 Asts: Carter, Çakır 4 PIR: Kone 15	Boxscore	Pts: Anderson 15; Rebs: Milić 10; Asts: Uzun 7 PIR: Milić 24	Arena: Pabellón Municipal Wurzburg; Attendance: 3,000; Referees: Łukasz Jankowski, Edgard Ceccarelli, Alessandro Perciavalle

==== Final Four ====
===== Semifinal =====
12 April 2024	Fenerbahçe Alagöz Holding (Turkish Basketball Federation)	89–80	(Turkish Basketball Federation) ÇBK Mersin	Mersin
19:00 TRT (UTC+3)	Scoring by quarter: 27–20, 21–22, 18–20, 23–18
	Pts: McBride 25; Rebs: Milić 11; Asts: Meesseman, Anderson 6 PIR: McBride 33	Boxscore	Pts: Mavunga 20; Rebs: Mavunga 8 Asts: Mabrey 8 PIR: Epoupa 23	Arena: Servet Tazegül Arena; Attendance: 6,000; Referees: Ariadna Chueca, Paulo Marques, Gvidas Gedvilas

===== Final =====
14 April 2024	Fenerbahçe Alagöz Holding (Turkish Basketball Federation)	106–73	(French Federation of Basketball) Villeneuve d'Ascq LM	Mersin
19:00 TRT (UTC+3)	Scoring by quarter: 28–27, 30–18, 19–16, 29–12
	Pts: Collier 33; Rebs: Collier 8 Asts: Anderson 13; PIR: Collier 36	Boxscore	Pts: Zellous, Burke 17; Rebs: Salaün 9 Asts: Lisova 5 PIR: Salaün 18	Arena: Servet Tazegül Arena; Attendance: 6,000; Referees: Ariadna Chueca, Viola Györgyi, Gvidas Gedvilas

=== Turkish Basketball Cup ===
2 January 2024 QF	Fenerbahçe Alagöz Holding	96–57	Nesibe Aydın	Istanbul
13:00 TRT (UTC+3)	Scoring by quarter: 24–12, 22–19, 32–12, 18–14
	Pts: Howard 23; Rebs: Howard, Meesseman 9 Asts: Onar 8 PIR: Howard 27	Boxscore	Pts: Cannon 16; Rebs: Cannon 10; Asts: Thomas 8 PIR: Cannon 17	Arena: Metro Enerji Sports Hall; Referees: Murat Ciner, Aydın Karaçam, Kadir Giray Esen

4 January 2024 SF	Fenerbahçe Alagöz Holding	93–86	OGM Ormanspor	Balıkesir
17:00 TRT (UTC+3)	Scoring by quarter: 26–24, 24–15, 20–19, 23–28
	Pts: Meesseman 22; Rebs: Howard 9 Asts: McBride 6 PIR: Meesseman 27	Boxscore	Pts: Dantas 33; Rebs: three players 6 Asts: Fıtık, Sutton 7 PIR: Dantas 25	Arena: Şehit Turgut Solak Spor Salonu; Referees: Alper Özgök, Münevver Özemre, Uğur Akyıldız

5 January 2024 F	Fenerbahçe Alagöz Holding	79–76(OT)	ÇBK Mersin	Balıkesir
19:00 TRT (UTC+3)	Scoring by quarter: 19–15, 18–13, 19–22, 15–21, Overtime: 8–5
	Pts: McBride 17; Rebs: Howard 14; Asts: McBride, Anderson 6 PIR: McBride 21	Boxscore	Pts: Mabrey 23; Rebs: Williams 15; Asts: Mabrey 9 PIR: Williams 28	Arena: Şehit Turgut Solak Spor Salonu; Referees: Fatih Arslanoğlu, Halil Erkoç, Alper Gökçebel
