= İdil Saçalır =

Turkish basketball player (born 2002)

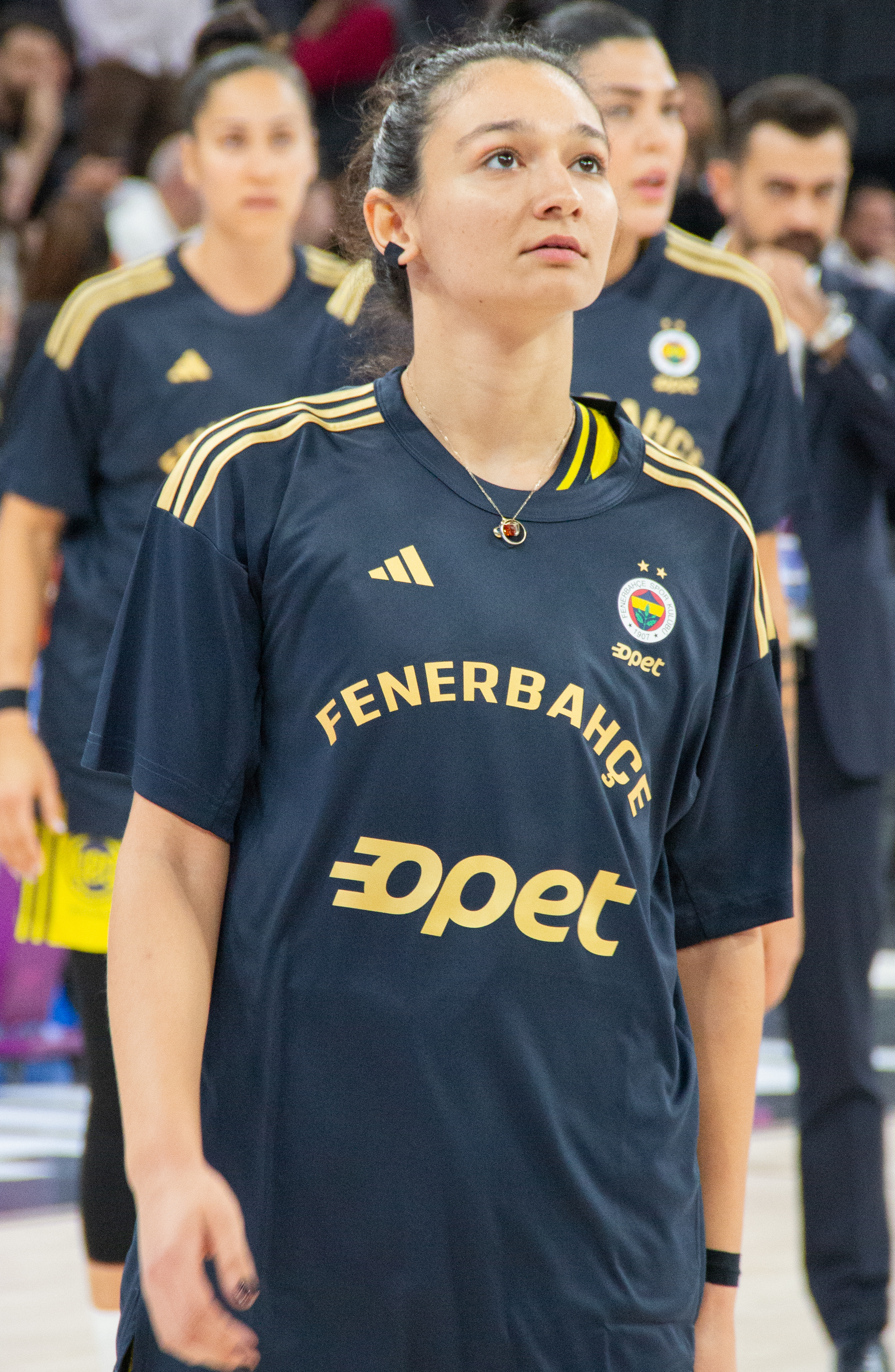

No. 7 – Beşiktaş
- Position: Small forward
- League: Turkish Super League

Personal information
- Born: 4 January 2002 (age 24) Istanbul, Turkey
- Listed height: 5 ft 11 in (1.80 m)
- Listed weight: 141 lb (64 kg)

Career history
- 2019–2022: Fenerbahçe Gelişim
- 2022–present: Fenerbahçe
- 2025–present: → Beşiktaş

Career highlights
- 2× EuroLeague champion (2023, 2024); 2× FIBA Europe SuperCup Women champion (2023, 2024); 3× Turkish Super League champion (2023, 2024, 2025); 2× Turkish Presidential Cup champion (2024, 2025); Turkish Cup champion (2024)

İdil Saçalır (born 4 January 2002) is a Turkish professional basketball player who plays as small forward position for Beşiktaş of the Turkish Super League on loan from Fenerbahçe.

== Professional career ==
Saçalı made her professional debut on 22 April 2022, playing in the first game of the quarterfinal series against Çankaya Üniversitesi. Beginning with the 2022–23 season, she became part of Fenerbahçe, competing in both domestic and continental competitions.

During her time with Fenerbahçe, Saçalı was part of the squad that won the EuroLeague Women title twice in a row in 2022–23 and 2024–25. In the 2023–24 season, Fenerbahçe defeated Villeneuve-d'Ascq 106–73 in the final to retain the title. Saçalı was also part of the Fenerbahçe squad that won the FIBA Europe SuperCup Women twice. Fenerbahçe won the 2023 SuperCup, defeating LDLC ASVEL Féminin 109–52, and successfully defended the title in 2024 with a 79–63 victory over Beşiktaş in the final.

On 5 December 2025, she joined Beşiktaş on loan from Fenerbahçe. On 19 June 2026, she extended her contract.

== Honours ==
- EuroLeague Women
  - Championship (2) 2022-23, 2023-24
- FIBA Europe SuperCup Women:
  - Championship (2) 2023, 2024
- Women's Basketball Super League of Turkey
  - Championship (3) 2022-23, 2023-24, 2024-25
- Turkish Cup
  - Championship (1) 2024
- Turkish Basketball Presidential Cup
  - Championship (2) 2024, 2025
