= Merve Aydın (basketball) =

Turkish basketball player

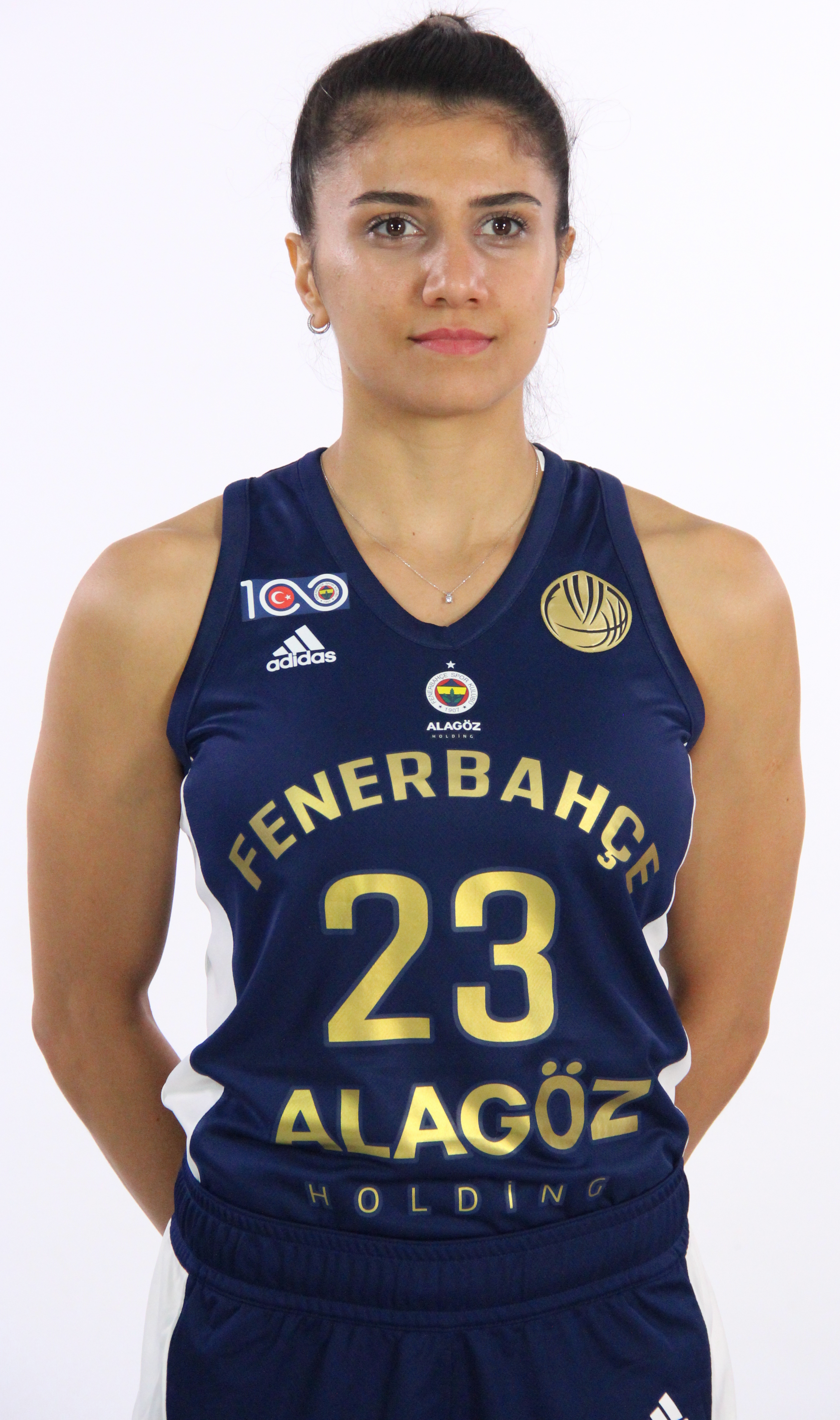

Personal information
- Born: 10 March 1994 (age 32) Mersin, Turkey
- Listed height: 5 ft 9 in (1.75 m)
- Listed weight: 128 lb (58 kg)

Career information
- Playing career: 2008–2024
- Position: Point guard

Career history
- 2008–2011: Mersin Büyükşehir Belediyespor
- 2011–2012: İstanbul Üniversitesi
- 2012–2014: Mersin Büyükşehir Belediyespor
- 2014–2015: İstanbul Üniversitesi
- 2015–2016: Yakın Doğu Üniversitesi
- 2016–2017: Girne Üniversitesi
- 2017–2019: Hatay Büyükşehir Belediyespor
- 2019–2020: Nantes Rezé Basket
- 2020: Club Baloncesto Al-Qázeres
- 2021–2022: Galatasaray
- 2022–2024: Fenerbahçe

Career highlights
- 2× EuroLeague champion (2023, 2024); FIBA Europe SuperCup Women winner (2023); Triple Crown (2024); 2× Turkish League champion (2022–23, 2023–24); Turkish Cup winner (2024)

Merve Aydın Özbek (born 10 March 1994) is a Turkish former professional basketball player. She contributed to the Survivor Turkey in 2021. She married Yunus Özbek (Turkish Airlines).

== Career ==
She began with basketball playing at the age of ten. Despite her height disadvantage, she became a successful player. In the 2008–09 season, at the age of fourteen, Merve Aydın was admitted to the senior team of Mersin B.B. SK becoming the youngest ever player in the Turkish Women's Basketball League. In the 2012–13 season, she was transferred back to Mersin B.B. after playing in the İstanbul Üniversitesi SK for some time.

Despite her injuries she returned to play in high-level competition.She played Eurocup semi-final with Hatay Büyükşehir Belediyesi (women's basketball) and played for them in 2017 until 2019. She transferred to the French first division (basketball) team Nantes Rezé Basket. For the following season she played for Spanish first division team Al-Qazeres. She played for half a season there and then joined to the Turkish show Survivor.

Aydın was a member of the national team at the 2011 FIBA Europe Under-18 Championship for Women, which ranked 7th. She won the bronze medal in 2012 and 2013 at FIBA Europe Under-20 Championship for Women with the national team.

== Honors ==
=== Individual ===
- 2011 Turkey Women's All-Star Talent
- 2023 Euroleague Women Champion
- 2023 Turkish League Champion
- 2023 Super Cup Champion
- 2024 Euroleague Women Champion
- 2024 Turkish Cup Champion

https://www.tbf.org.tr/haber/merve-aydin-oyunculuk-kariyerini-noktaladi-2024-04-18

=== National ===
FIBA Europe Under-20 Championship for Women

- 2012 – (bronze)
- 2013 – (bronze)

== See also ==
- Turkish women in sports
