= Natasha Howard =

American basketball player (born 1991)

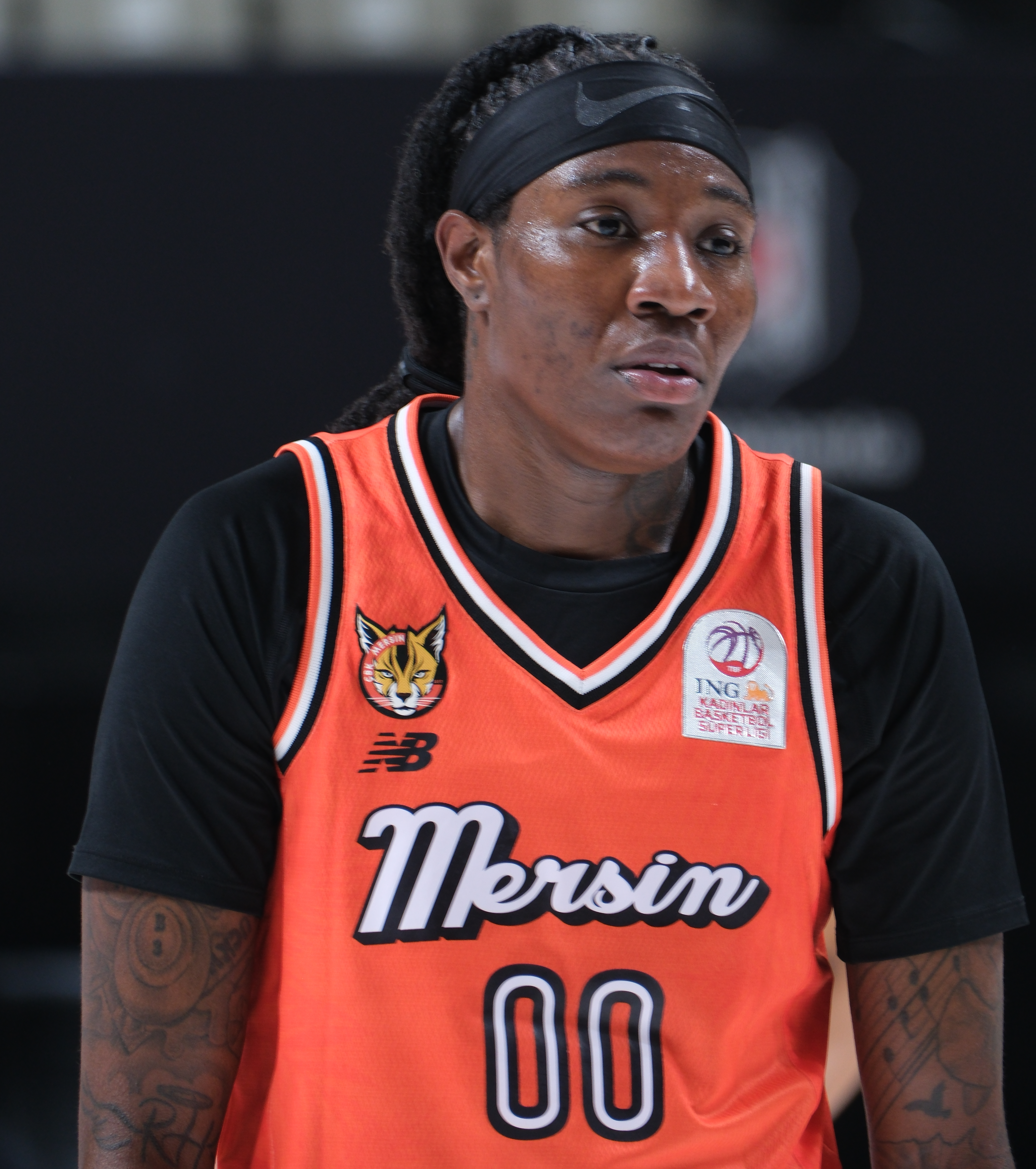
- Howard with Çukurova Basketbol in 2025

No. 1 – Minnesota Lynx
- Position: Power forward
- League: WNBA

Personal information
- Born: September 2, 1991 (age 35) Toledo, Ohio, U.S.
- Listed height: 6 ft 2 in (1.88 m)
- Listed weight: 171 lb (78 kg)

Career information
- High school: Waite (Toledo, Ohio)
- College: Florida State (2010–2014)
- WNBA draft: 2014: 1st round, 5th overall pick
- Drafted by: Indiana Fever
- Playing career: 2014–present

Career history
- 2014–2015: Indiana Fever
- 2014–2015: Elitzur Ramla
- 2015–2016: Yakin Dogu
- 2016–2017: Minnesota Lynx
- 2016–2017: Samsung Life Blue Minx
- 2018–2020: Seattle Storm
- 2018–2019: Xinjiang Magic Deer
- 2020–2021: Reyer Venezia
- 2021–2022: New York Liberty
- 2021–2022: Dynamo Kursk
- 2022–2024: Fenerbahce
- 2023–2024: Dallas Wings
- 2024–2025: Çukurova Basketbol
- 2025: Indiana Fever
- 2026–present: Minnesota Lynx
- 2026–present: Galatasaray

Career highlights
- 3× WNBA champion (2017, 2018, 2020); 3× WNBA All-Star (2019, 2022, 2026); WNBA Defensive Player of the Year (2019); All-WNBA First Team (2019); 2× WNBA All-Defensive First Team (2018, 2019); WNBA Most Improved Player (2018); WNBA Commissioner's Cup champion (2025); WNBA Commissioner's Cup MVP (2025); 2× EuroLeague champion (2023, 2024); FIBA Europe SuperCup Women winner (2023); Triple Crown (2024); 2× Turkish League champion (2022–23, 2023–24); Turkish Cup winner (2024); 2× First-team All-ACC (2013, 2014); 2× ACC All-Defensive Team (2012, 2014); ACC All-Freshman Team (2011); McDonald's All-American Game Co-MVP (2010); Ohio Ms. Basketball (2010)
- Stats at WNBA.com
- Stats at Basketball Reference

Natasha Howard (born September 2, 1991) is an American professional basketball player for the Minnesota Lynx of the Women's National Basketball Association (WNBA). Howard was the 2019 WNBA Defensive Player of the Year. She was drafted in 2014 by the Fever. Born in Toledo, Ohio, she played college basketball for Florida State University, where she finished sixth in the NCAA for field goal percentage.

== Early life ==
Howard started playing basketball at the age of ten, when her uncle offered her two dollars in return for dribbling a basketball.

In elementary school, she played on an all-boys basketball team, as a girls team wasn’t available.

=== High school ===
Howard attended Waite High School in Toledo, Ohio. In her freshman season (2006–2007), the Waite High School Indians won their third consecutive Toledo City League championship.

The Toledo Blade named Howard as Girls Player of the Year in both 2008 and 2010.

In her senior year, Howard led the Indians to the OHSAA D I state championship, where they lost 49-47 against Canton McKinley.

In 2010, Howard was selected for the McDonald’s All-American Game and the WBCA High School All-America game. She was also named Ohio’s 2010 Associated Press Ms. Basketball. Howard was ranked second overall, behind Chiney Ogwumike, in the SportsCenter NEXT 100 list of the top-ranked high school girls’ basketball prospects for the class of 2010.

=== College ===
Howard started all 32 games her freshman season at Florida State University (FSU). In her first year as a Seminole, she averaged 10.6 points and 6.6 rebounds per game. Howard was selected for the 2011 ACC All-Freshman Team. As a junior, Howard averaged 12.7 points and 7.5 rebounds.

In Howard’s senior season, she improved to average 20.5 points and 9.3 rebounds per game. By the end of her college basketball career, Howard had set an FSU program record of 41 double-doubles and 1,047 rebounds. With 1,811 points in her college career, Howard became the second all-time scorer in program history.

== Professional career ==
=== WNBA ===
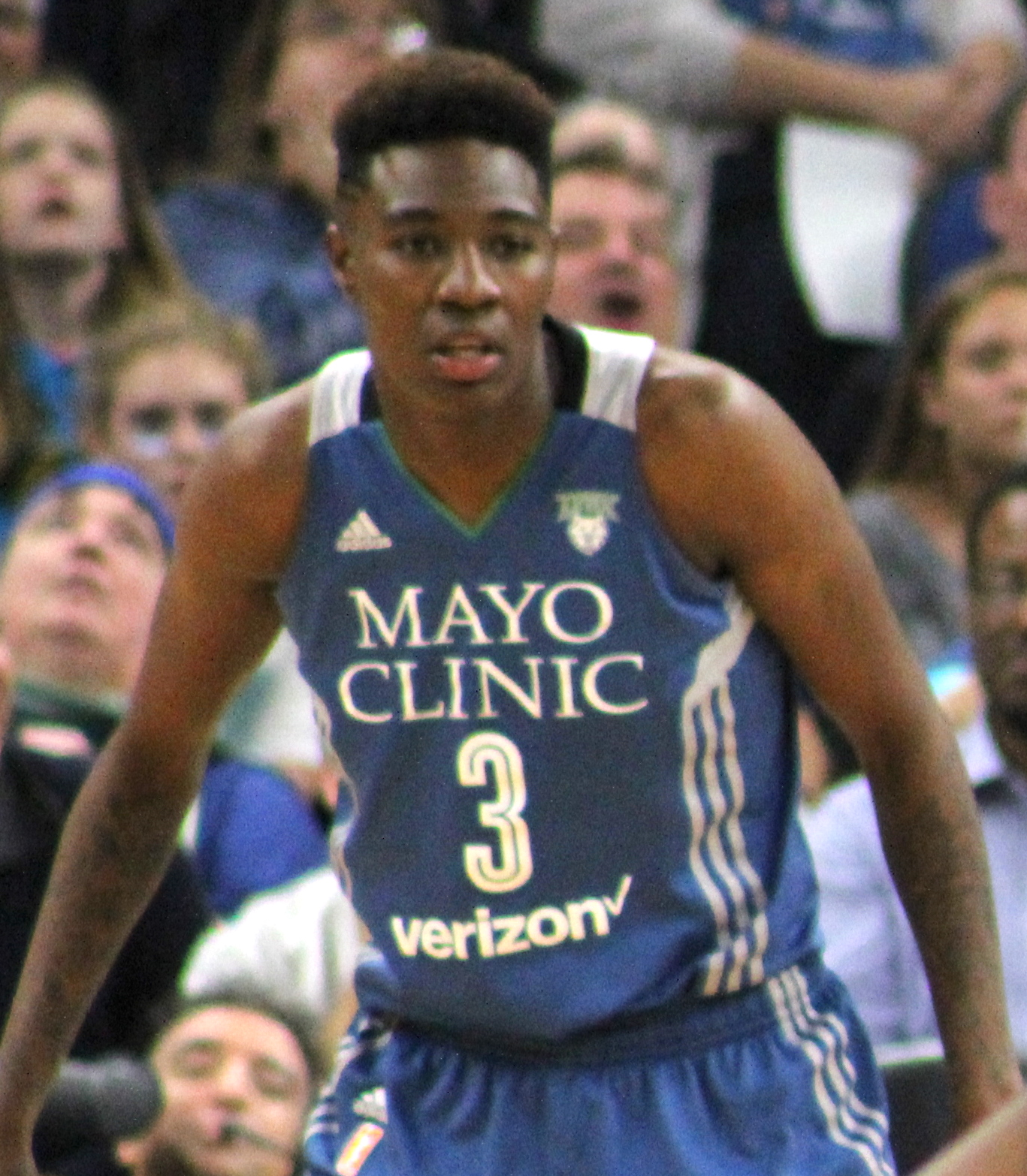
Howard in 2016

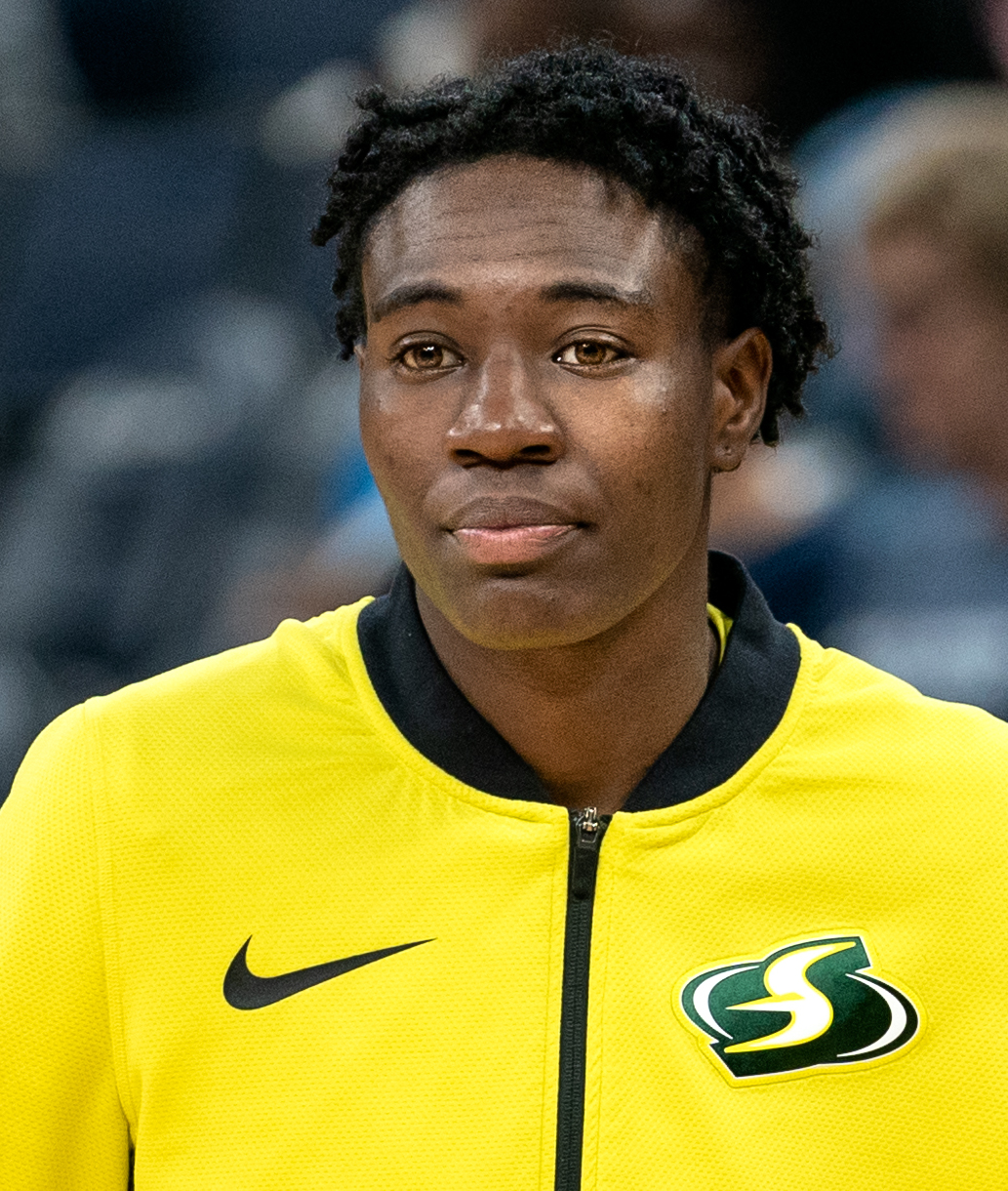
Howard in 2019

Howard was selected 5th overall by the Indiana Fever in the 2014 WNBA draft. Howard started off the 2014 season hot scoring 16 points and 21 points in her first two games as a professional. The 21 point performance was a career high in points. Howard averaged 7.0 points and 3.1 rebounds per game in her rookie season in Indiana.

During her second season with Indiana, Howard regressed in both points and rebounding, averaging 4.2 points and 2.6 rebounds. The only times that Howard scored in double figures were an August 4 loss to the Chicago Sky, when she scored 13 points, and on a September 1 win against the Connecticut Sun, when she scored 10 points. During her second season, the Fever reached the WNBA Finals, where they faced off against the Minnesota Lynx. The Fever ultimately lost the series 3–2, but Howard didn't miss a single shot throughout the entire Finals, going 8 for 8 from the floor in five games and 3 for 3 free throws.

On February 2, 2016, the Fever traded Howard to the Minnesota Lynx in a sign-and-trade deal to acquire Devereaux Peters.

During her first season with the Lynx, Howard was part of the post rotation that included Sylvia Fowles, Rebekkah Brunson, and Janel McCarville. She became a key contributor off the bench for the Lynx the entire season. In her first game against Indiana since the trade, Howard scored 11 points, on 5–5 shooting, and grabbed 3 rebounds. She matched her career high of 21 points in a July 2 win against the San Antonio Stars. Howard, once again, reached the WNBA Finals for a 2nd consecutive season, although the Lynx fell to the Los Angeles Sparks 3 games to 2.

In her second season with the Lynx, Howard continued with her bench role, contributing with her scoring and rebounding, helping the Lynx back to championship contention. The Lynx returned to the Finals, making it Howard's third appearance in the finals. This time, in a finals rematch against the Sparks, the Lynx won 3 games to 2, earning Howard her first championship.

On February 7, 2018, Howard was traded to the Seattle Storm in exchange for a second round pick in the 2018 WNBA draft. In the 2018 season, Howard would be the starting power forward for the Storm. She would have the best season of her career in Seattle as she averaged career-highs in scoring, blocks, rebounds, assists and steals. Howard would also be named to the WNBA All-Defensive First Team and was second in the league in blocks. The Storm finished with a league-best 26–8 record. They would receive a double-bye to the semi-finals. In the semi-finals series, the Storm would defeat the Phoenix Mercury in five games advancing to the Finals, making this Howard's fourth consecutive finals appearance. In the Finals, the Storm would defeat the Washington Mystics in a three-game sweep. In Game 3, Howard scored a new career-high 29 points along with 14 rebounds.

In 2019, Howard would have a breakout season. She would be voted into the 2019 WNBA All-Star Game, making it her first all-star appearance. On July 17, 2019, Howard scored a new career-high 33 points in a 90–79 victory over the Minnesota Lynx. Howard would finish the season average a new career-high in scoring, rebounds, assists and steals. She was made a WNBA All-Star and named to the WNBA All-Defensive First Team for the second time while also winning the WNBA Defensive Player of the Year Award. The Storm finished as the number 6 seed with an 18–16 record. The Storm, however, could not defend their title in the playoffs as they were eliminated in the second-round elimination game by the Los Angeles Sparks.

In 2020, the season was delayed and shortened to 22 games in a bubble at IMG Academy due to the COVID-19 pandemic. Howard played all 22 games, the Storm had a fully active roster with everyone healthy and available as they finished the season 18–4 with the number 2 seed, receiving a double-bye to the semi-finals. In the playoff semi-finals they defeated the Minnesota Lynx in a three-game sweep, going back to the Finals for the second time in three years. In the Finals, the Storm swept the Las Vegas Aces to win the series, earning Howard her third WNBA championship.

In 2021, Howard was acquired by the New York Liberty in a three-team trade deal.

In January 2023, Howard was traded to the Dallas Wings in a three-team deal.

Howard signed a one-year $214,666 contract with the Indiana Fever as a free agent on February 2, 2025. Bringing Howard back to Indiana was one of the priorities for the Fever's front office, which had been completely restructured after the 2024 season.

Howard left the Indiana Fever to return to the Minnesota Lynx in free agency, signing a two-year, $1.4 million contract in April 2026. Her departure was primarily driven by roster fit issues, salary cap constraints, and a full-circle career opportunity. She was named the Western Conference Player of the Week for June 22-28, 2026. She was named a starter for Team Coop at the All-Star game on July 25, 2026. Howard, along with rookie Olivia Miles, has been key for the Minnesota Lynx in the 2026 season while Napheesa Collier was out recovering from injury, enabling them to be the top-ranked team without their star player.

=== Overseas ===
Before her first WNBA season, Howard played in Israeli League for Elitzur Ramla in the 2014–15 off-season.

On July 29, 2026, she signed a contract with the Turkish giant Galatasaray.

== Career statistics ==
Legend
| GP | Games played | GS | Games started | MPG | Minutes per game | RPG | Rebounds per game |
| APG | Assists per game | SPG | Steals per game | BPG | Blocks per game | PPG | Points per game |
| TO | Turnovers per game | FG% | Field-goal percentage | 3P% | 3-point field-goal percentage | FT% | Free-throw percentage |
| **Bold** | Career best | ° | League leader |

| † | Denotes seasons in which Howard won a WNBA championship |

=== WNBA ===
==== Regular season ====
WNBA regular season statistics
| Year | Team | GP | GS | MPG | FG% | 3P% | FT% | RPG | APG | SPG | BPG | TO | PPG |
|---|---|---|---|---|---|---|---|---|---|---|---|---|---|
| 2014 | Indiana | 34 | 15 | 17.0 | .443 | .000 | .594 | 3.1 | .6 | .8 | .6 | 1.5 | 7.0 |
| 2015 | Indiana | 30 | 2 | 11.4 | .379 | .000 | .721 | 2.6 | .4 | .4 | .4 | .9 | 4.2 |
| 2016 | Minnesota | 34 | 1 | 14.6 | .574 | .200 | .677 | 3.6 | .8 | .7 | .7 | 1.1 | 6.7 |
| 2017^{†} | Minnesota | 34 | 0 | 11.7 | .484 | .214 | .733 | 2.4 | .7 | .5 | .6 | **.7** | 4.3 |
| 2018^{†} | Seattle | 34 | 33 | 25.6 | .547 | .327 | .798 | 6.4 | 1.0 | 1.2 | **1.9** | 1.8 | 13.2 |
| 2019 | Seattle | 34 | 34 | 31.3 | .439 | .308 | .810 | **8.2** | 2.1 | **2.2** | 1.7 | 2.9 | **18.1** |
| 2020^{†} | Seattle | 22 | 22 | 21.0 | .530 | **.350** | .778 | 7.1 | 1.0 | 1.7 | .6 | 2.1 | 9.5 |
| 2021 | New York | 13 | 13 | 27.5 | .494 | .333 | .774 | 7.2 | 1.7 | 1.3 | .5 | 3.8 | 16.2 |
| 2022 | New York | 35 | 35 | 29.9 | .482 | .326 | .715 | 7.3 | 2.3 | 1.3 | 1.0 | 3.2 | 15.1 |
| 2023 | Dallas | 39 | 39 | **33.1** | .458 | .299 | **.815** | 8.0 | 2.6 | 1.3 | 1.2 | 2.8 | 16.5 |
| 2024 | Dallas | 27 | 26 | 30.6 | .456 | .200 | .718 | 6.7 | 2.9 | 1.3 | .8 | 3.1 | 17.6 |
| 2025 | Indiana | **44** | **44** | 24.1 | .552 | .182 | .712 | 6.6 | 1.5 | 1.2 | .6 | 1.9 | 11.4 |
| 2026 | Minnesota | **44**° | **44**° | 28.4 | **.598** | .189 | .720 | 7.6 | **3.3** | 1.6 | 1.0 | 2.5 | 14.8 |
| **Career** | 13 years, 5 teams | 424 | 308 | 23.7 | .496 | .287 | .742 | 5.9 | 1.7 | 1.2 | .9 | 2.1 | 11.8 |
| **Career** | All-Star | 3 | 2 | 20.4 | .444 | .400 | — | 4.0 | .7 | .3 | .0 | 1.0 | 10.0 |

==== Playoffs ====
WNBA playoff statistics
| Year | Team | GP | GS | MPG | FG% | 3P% | FT% | RPG | APG | SPG | BPG | TO | PPG |
|---|---|---|---|---|---|---|---|---|---|---|---|---|---|
| 2014 | Indiana | 4 | 0 | 3.7 | .167 | — | **1.000** | 1.0 | .0 | .0 | .0 | **.5** | 1.0 |
| 2015 | Indiana | **9** | 0 | 7.1 | **.917** | — | **1.000** | .6 | .3 | .3 | .1 | **.5** | 2.8 |
| 2016 | Minnesota | 8 | 0 | 13.0 | .700 | — | .429 | 2.6 | .6 | .8 | .1 | .7 | 5.6 |
| 2017^{†} | Minnesota | 7 | 0 | 5.6 | .200 | .000 | .800 | .9 | .0 | .2 | .0 | **.5** | 1.1 |
| 2018^{†} | Seattle | 8 | **8** | 31.5 | .573 | **.500** | .850 | 8.3 | 1.5 | 1.0 | 1.3 | 2.2 | 15.8 |
| 2019 | Seattle | 2 | 2 | 28.8 | .400 | .429 | .750 | 9.0 | **4.0** | **2.0** | **1.5** | 2.0 | 11.0 |
| 2020^{†} | Seattle | 6 | 6 | 23.0 | .548 | **.500** | .772 | 5.2 | 1.5 | 1.2 | .8 | 1.5 | 9.5 |
| 2021 | New York | 1 | 1 | 31.0 | .438 | **.500** | — | **10.0** | 2.0 | 1.0 | 1.0 | 3.0 | **16.0** |
| 2022 | New York | 3 | 3 | 27.7 | .442 | .100 | **1.000** | 6.7 | 1.0 | .7 | .0 | 2.0 | 14.7 |
| 2023 | Dallas | 5 | 5 | **34.2** | .634 | .350 | .833 | 8.4 | 2.2 | 1.6 | 1.4 | 3.4 | 12.0 |
| 2025 | Indiana | 8 | **8** | 24.4 | .484 | .000 | .813 | 6.3 | 2.0 | .6 | .1 | 2.1 | 9.4 |
| 2026 | Minnesota | 2 | 2 | 17.0 | .500 | — | .500 | 3.5 | 1.5 | .0 | 1.0 | 1.5 | 5.0 |
| **Career** | 12 years, 5 teams | 63 | 35 | 18.8 | .498 | .333 | .783 | 4.5 | 1.1 | .7 | .5 | 1.5 | 7.8 |

=== College ===
NCAA statistics
| Year | Team | GP | GS | MPG | FG% | 3P% | FT% | RPG | APG | SPG | BPG | TO | PPG |
|---|---|---|---|---|---|---|---|---|---|---|---|---|---|
| 2010–11 | Florida State | 32 | 32 | 25.5 | .460 | **.368** | .549 | 6.6 | .8 | 1.1 | .7 | 3.1 | 10.6 |
| 2011–12 | Florida State | 31 | 31 | 30.2 | .487 | .190 | .615 | 9.1 | **1.4** | 1.5 | 1.3 | 3.1 | 12.2 |
| 2012–13 | Florida State | **33** | 31 | 26.8 | .486 | .000 | .612 | 7.5 | .7 | 1.8 | 1.5 | **2.4** | 12.7 |
| 2013–14 | Florida State | **33** | **33** | **31.2** | **.594** | — | **.650** | **9.3** | .5 | **2.1** | **2.3** | 2.7 | **20.5** |
| **Career** | | 129 | 127 | 28.4 | .516 | .313 | .617 | 8.1 | .9 | 1.6 | 1.4 | 2.8 | 14.0 |

== Personal life ==
Howard’s mother is Latasha Howard. She has three siblings: two sisters and a brother.

In a 2019 interview, Howard shared that she has been out since her sophomore year of high school.

Howard married Jacqueline "Jackyy" Howard in Tampa, Florida, on March 10, 2017. On July 13, 2019, Howard’s then-wife, Jacqueline, accused Howard of domestic violence through a series of videos and screenshots of text messages posted on Twitter. Shortly afterwards, both the WNBA and Seattle Storm announced investigations into the allegations.

On July 16, 2019, Howard released a statement through her attorney, denying the allegations and sharing that she had filed for divorce. In court documents, Howard alleged that Jacqueline stabbed her in 2016, while Howard was playing in South Korea. Howard also accused Jacqueline of transferring $588,888 from a joint account to an account in Jacqueline’s name. Howard was granted a restraining order preventing Jacqueline from accessing the funds. Howard continued to play, starting all 34 games for the Seattle Storm in the 2019 WNBA season.

In 2024, Howard married Jac’Eil Duckworth Howard. Their wedding was shown in season 11, episode 21 of Basketball Wives.

In February 2026, the Toledo City Council recognized Howard’s achievements on and off the court as part of Black History Month celebrations.

Howard's memoir, The Vision Through My Lens: My Life in Basketball and Beyond, was released on September 15, 2026.

== See also ==
- List of WNBA career blocks leaders
- List of WNBA career scoring leaders
- List of WNBA season turnovers leaders
