= 2024–25 Galatasaray S.K. (women's basketball) season =

Turkish basketball team season

Galatasaray Çağdaş Faktoring
2024–25 season
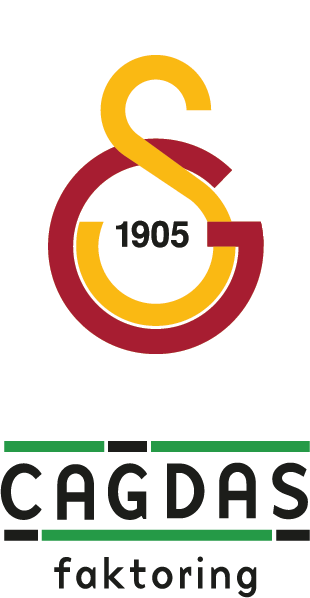
- President: (Turkey) Dursun Özbek
- Head coach: (Turkey) Ekrem Memnun
- Arena: Sinan Erdem Dome
- Women's Basketball Super League: 3rd seed
- Playoffs: Semifinals
- EuroCup Women: Round of 16
- Turkish Women's Basketball Cup: Quarterfinals

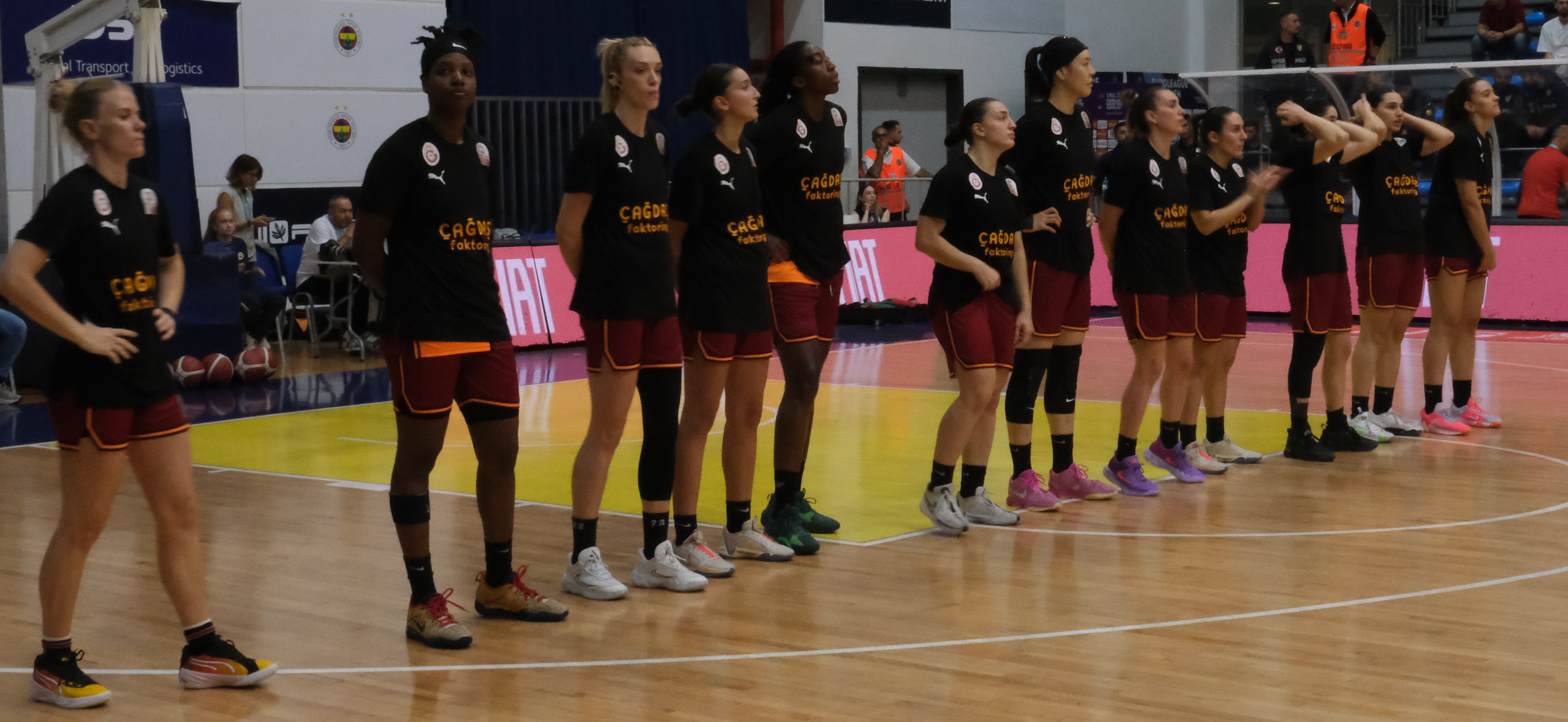
Galatasaray Çağdaş Faktoring roster in October 2024

The 2024–25 season is Galatasaray's 70th season in the existence of the club. The team plays in the Women's Basketball Super League and in the EuroCup Women.

== Season overview ==
=== Pre-season ===
On 22 March, Ekrem Memnun was appointed as the head coach. The official contract covering the 2024–25 and 2025–26 seasons was signed at the ceremony with the participation of President Dursun Özbek.

On 1 August, Galatasaray started preparations for the new season.

On 21 August, Turkish Women's Basketball Super League 2024–25 Season fixtures have been announced.

On 6 September, Galatasaray Çağdaş Faktoring camp program has been announced.

== Players ==
=== Current roster ===
Galatasaray roster
Players
Coaches

Pos.	No.	Nat.	Name	Ht.	Wt.	Age
PF	1	(Turkey)	Gül, Selin Rachel	1.89 m (6 ft 2 in)		22 – 21 December 2003
PF	2	(Turkey)	Tokmak, Simge	1.86 m (6 ft 1 in)		23 – 23 January 2003
SF	3	(Turkey)	Yılmaz, Sude	1.82 m (6 ft 0 in)		24 – 15 March 2002
PG	6	(Turkey)	Fitik, Gökşen	1.75 m (5 ft 9 in)		25 – 11 August 2001
PG	7	(Turkey)	Günay, Ayşegül	1.73 m (5 ft 8 in)		34 – 26 October 1992
SG	8	(Turkey)	Cora, Ayşe (C)	1.75 m (5 ft 9 in)	69 kg (152 lb)	33 – 3 March 1993
C	9	(South Korea)	Ji-su, Park	1.93 m (6 ft 4 in)	93 kg (205 lb)	27 – 6 December 1998
PG	11	(Turkey)	Erdoğan, Derin	1.68 m (5 ft 6 in)		24 – 28 June 2002
C	12	(Latvia)	Šteinberga, Anete	1.91 m (6 ft 3 in)	80 kg (176 lb)	36 – 29 January 1990
C	13	(United States) (Turkey)	Hollingsworth, Quanitra	1.98 m (6 ft 6 in)	91 kg (201 lb)	37 – 15 November 1988
SF	14	(Turkey)	Vardar, Arifecan	1.84 m (6 ft 0 in)		23 – 13 January 2003
PG	21	(Turkey)	Şahin, Berna	1.70 m (5 ft 7 in)		23 – 21 January 2003
F	23	(Turkey)	Yıldızhan, Meltem	1.88 m (6 ft 2 in)	81 kg (179 lb)	27 – 5 August 1999
SF	24	(Italy)	Zandalasini, Cecilia	1.88 m (6 ft 2 in)	82 kg (181 lb)	30 – 16 March 1996
C	28	(China)	Yueru, Li	2.01 m (6 ft 7 in)		27 – 28 March 1999
F	34	(United States) (Azerbaijan)	Fraser, Brianna Ashaki	1.90 m (6 ft 3 in)		29 – 22 May 1997
PG	35	(Belgium)	Vanloo, Julie	1.72 m (5 ft 8 in)		33 – 10 February 1993

Head coach

- (Turkey) Ekrem Memnun

Assistant coach(es)

- (Turkey) Selim Aldağ
- (Turkey) Ege Talay

Athletic trainer(s)

- (Turkey) Semih Eroğlu
- (Turkey) Serkan Bodur

Legend

- (C) Team captain
- (DC) Dual citizenship
- Injured

- Roster
Updated: 2 December 2024

=== Depth chart ===
Pos.	Starting 5	Bench 1	Bench 2	Bench 3
C	Li Yueru	Park Ji-su	Quanitra Hollingsworth
PF	Anete Šteinberga	Meltem Yıldızhan	Selin Rachel Gül	Simge Tokmak
SF	Brianna Ashaki Fraser	Cecilia Zandalasini	Sude Yılmaz	Arifecan Vardar
SG	Gökşen Fitik	Ayşe Cora
PG	Julie Vanloo	Derin Erdoğan	Ayşegül Günay	Berna Şahin

(colours: Turkish or homegrown players; foreign players)

=== Transactions ===
==== Players In ====
No.	Pos.	Nat.	Name	Age	Moving from		Type	Ends	Transfer fee	Date	Source
8	SG	(Turkey)	Ayşe Cora	31	İzmit Belediyespor	(Turkey)	1 years	June 2025	Free	24 May 2024	
6	PG	(Turkey)	Gökşen Fitik	22	OGM Ormanspor	(Turkey)	2 years	June 2026	Free	24 May 2024	
11	PG	(Turkey)	Derin Erdoğan	21	Northeastern Huskies	(United States)	1 years	June 2025	Free	24 May 2024	
34	F	(United States) (Azerbaijan)	Brianna Ashaki Fraser	27	KGHM BC Polkowice	(Poland)	1 years	June 2025	Free	19 July 2024	
9	C	(South Korea)	Park Ji-su	25	Cheongju KB Stars	(South Korea)	1 years	June 2025	Free	20 July 2024	
13	C	(United States) (Turkey)	Quanitra Hollingsworth	35	ÇBK Mersin	(Turkey)	1 years	June 2025	Free	23 July 2024	
24	SF	(Italy)	Cecilia Zandalasini	28	Virtus Bologna	(Italy)	1 years	June 2025	Free	24 July 2024	
7	PG	(Turkey)	Ayşegül Günay	31	Kayseri Basketbol	(Turkey)	1 years	June 2025	Free	26 July 2024	
1	PF	(Turkey)	Selin Rachel Gül	20	Fenerbahçe	(Turkey)	1 years	June 2025	Free	27 July 2024	
28	C	(China)	Li Yueru	25	Bodrum Basketbol Spor Kulübü	(Turkey)	6 months	June 2025	Undisclosed	21 November 2024	
12	C	(Latvia)	Anete Šteinberga	34	Tango Bourges Basket	(France)	6 months	June 2025	Undisclosed	2 December 2024	

==== Players Out ====
No.	Pos.	Nat.	Name	Age	Moving to		Type	Transfer fee	Date	Source
1	PF	(United States)	NaLyssa Smith	23	Indiana Fever	(United States)	End of contract	Free	May 2024	
15	C	(United States) (Turkey)	Teaira McCowan	27	Dallas Wings	(United States)	End of contract	Free	May 2024	
21	F	(United Kingdom)	Mikiah Herbert Harrigan	25	Phoenix Mercury	(United States)	End of contract	Free	May 2024	
24	G	(Belgium)	Hind Ben Abdelkader	28			End of contract	Free	May 2024	
32	SG	(United States) (France)	Bria Hartley	31			End of contract	Free	May 2024	
3	SG	(Turkey)	Yağmur Kübra Taşar	24	Bodrum Basketbol Spor Kulübü	(Turkey)	End of contract	Free	15 May 2024	
4	PG	(Turkey)	Büşra Akbaş	29	Botaş	(Turkey)	End of contract	Free	15 May 2024	
11	C	(Turkey)	İnci Güçlü	25	Emlak Konut SK	(Turkey)	End of contract	Free	15 May 2024	
17	PG	(Turkey)	Gizem Yavuz	36	Retired		End of contract	Free	15 May 2024	
28	SF	(Turkey)	Harika Eldaş	34			End of contract	Free	15 May 2024	

==== Contract extension ====
No.	Pos.	Nat.	Name	Age	Cont.	Date	Source
23	F	(Turkey)	Meltem Yıldızhan	24	1	24 May 2024	
35	PG	(Belgium)	Julie Vanloo	31	1	21 July 2024	
8	SF	(Turkey)	Sude Yılmaz	22	1	23 July 2024	

== Club ==
=== Technical Staff ===
As of 9 August 2024

Staff member	Position
Ekrem Memnun	Head Coach
Işıl Alben	General Coordinator
Melahat Aydın	Team Manager
Beril Kefeli	Event Manager
Selim Aldağ	Assistant Coach
Ege Talay	Assistant Coach
Semih Eroğlu	Conditioner
Serkan Bodur	Conditioner
Zerrin Hatacıkoğlu	Masseuse
Osman Aşbay	Masseur
Pelin Yılmaz	Physiotherapist
Alaaddin Akkoyun	Material Manager
İpek Birol	Media Communications Manager
Özcan Kör	Transportation Manager

=== Uniform ===
Home	Away	Third

=== Sponsorship and kit manufacturers ===
- Supplier: Puma
- Name sponsor: Çağdaş Faktoring
- Main sponsor: Çağdaş Faktoring
- Back sponsor: Başak Traktör
- Sleeve sponsor: —
- Lateral sponsor: —
- Short sponsor: —
- Socks sponsor: —

== Pre-season and friendlies ==
10 September 2024 Friendly	Galatasaray Çağdaş Faktoring (Turkish Basketball Federation)	71–59	(Basketball Federation of Serbia) Crvena zvezda	Kranjska Gora, Slovenia
13:00 TRT (UTC+3)
		Boxscore

13 September 2024 Friendly	Galatasaray Çağdaş Faktoring (Turkish Basketball Federation)	84–30	(Basketball Federation of Slovenia) Triglav Kranj	Kranjska Gora, Slovenia
19:00 TRT (UTC+3)
		Boxscore

18 September 2024 Erciyes Cup	Galatasaray Çağdaş Faktoring (Turkish Basketball Federation)	72–78	(Turkish Basketball Federation) Danilos Pizza	Kayseri, Turkey
16:00 TRT (UTC+3)
		Boxscore; Report		Arena: Kadir Has Spor Salonu; Referees: Mehmet Şahin, Umut Özgün Ergün, Kemal Vural

19 September 2024 Erciyes Cup	Emlak Konut (Turkish Basketball Federation)	74–56	(Turkish Basketball Federation) Galatasaray Çağdaş Faktoring	Kayseri, Turkey
16:00 TRT (UTC+3)
		Boxscore; Report		Arena: Kadir Has Spor Salonu; Referees: Batuhan Söylemezoğlu, Umut Özgün Ergün, Kemal Vural

21 September 2024 Erciyes Cup	Melikgazi Kayseri Basketbol (Turkish Basketball Federation)	51–72	(Turkish Basketball Federation) Galatasaray Çağdaş Faktoring	Kayseri, Turkey
18:30 TRT (UTC+3)
		Boxscore		Arena: Kadir Has Spor Salonu

== Competitions ==
=== Overall ===
Competition	Started round	Final position / round	First match	Last match
Women's Basketball Super League	Round 1	3rd	28 September 2024	15 March 2025
Women's Basketball Super League Playoffs	Quarterfinals	Semifinals	27 March 2025	4 April 2025
EuroCup Women	Round 1	Round of 16	9 October 2024	18 March 2025
Turkish Women's Basketball Cup	Quarterfinals	Quarterfinals	19 March 2025	19 March 2025

Updated to match played 4 April 2025
Source: Competitions

=== Overview ===
Competition	Record							
Competition	Pld	W	D	L	PF	PA	PD	Win %
Women's Basketball Super League	22	17	0	5	1,706	1,437	+269	77.27
Women's Basketball Super League Playoffs	4	2	0	2	310	291	+19	50.00
EuroCup Women	10	8	0	2	824	669	+155	80.00
Turkish Women's Basketball Cup	1	0	0	1	67	81	−14	0.00
Total	37	27	0	10	2,907	2,478	+429	72.97

Last updated: 4 April 2025
Source: Competitions

=== Women's Basketball Super League ===
==== Regular season ====
Pos	Team	Pld	W	L	PF	PA	PD	Pts	Qualification
1	Fenerbahçe	22	18	4	1873	1458	+415	40	Play Offs
2	ÇBK Mersin	22	17	5	1772	1506	+266	39 (Note: ÇBK Mersin 129–128 Galatasaray)	Play Offs
3	Galatasaray	22	17	5	1706	1447	+259	39	Play Offs
4	Emlak Konut	22	15	7	1705	1577	+128	37	Play Offs
5	Beşiktaş	22	11	11	1676	1602	+74	33	Play Offs
6	Botaş	22	10	12	1602	1632	−30	32 (Note: Botaş 2–0 Nesibe Aydın)	Play Offs
7	Nesibe Aydın	22	10	12	1730	1795	−65	32	Play Offs
8	Kayseri Basketbol	22	9	13	1688	1675	+13	31 (Note: Kayseri Basketbol 157–146 Ormanspor)	Play Offs
9	Ormanspor	22	9	13	1632	1657	−25	31	
10	Danilos Pizza	22	7	15	1664	1798	−134	29	
11	Tarsus Belediyesi	22	6	16	1716	1921	−205	28	Relegation to TKBL
12	Bodrum Basketbol	22	3	19	1315	2011	−696	25	Relegation to TKBL

Source: KBSL
Rules for classification: 1) Points; 2) Points difference; 3) Points scored.

==== Results summary ====
Overall						Home					Away				
Pld	W	L	PF	PA	PD	W	L	PF	PA	PD	W	L	PF	PA	PD
22	17	5	1706	1437	+269	8	3	855	686	+169	9	2	851	751	+100

Last updated: 16 March 2025.
Source: TBF.org.tr

==== Results by round ====
Round	1	2	3	4	5	6	7	8	9	10	11	12	13	14	15	16	17	18	19	20	21	22	23	24	25	26
Ground	A	H	A	H	A	B	A	H	A	H	A	H	A	H	A	H	A	H	B	H	A	H	A	H	A	H
Result	W	W	L	W	W	B	W	W	W	W	W	C	L	W	W	L	W	W	B	L	W	L	W	W	C	W
Position	3	2	3	2	1	2	2	2	1	1	1	2	2	2	2	2	2	2	3	3	3	3	3	2	3	3

Updated to match(es) played on 16 March 2025. Source: TBF.org.tr
A = Away; H = Home; B = Bye; W = Win; L = Loss; C = Canceled

==== Matches ====
28 September 2024 1	İlkem Yapı Tarsus Spor	57–77	Galatasaray Çağdaş Faktoring	Mersin, Turkey
14:00 TRT (UTC+3)	Scoring by quarter: 15–21, 8–21, 19–18, 15–17
TBF TV - YouTube	Pts: Hurt 18; Rebs: Alleyne 16; Asts: Heal 5 PIR: Hurt 21	Boxscore; Report	Pts: Fraser 19; Rebs: Ji-su 13; Asts: Vanloo 11; PIR: Ji-su 27	Arena: Servet Tazegül Arena; Referees: Hüseyin Çelik, Çağatay Taşkın, Oğuzhan Güzel

6 October 2024 2	Galatasaray Çağdaş Faktoring	68–54	OGM Ormanspor	Ataköy, Istanbul, Turkey
18:00 TRT (UTC+3)	Scoring by quarter: 15–11, 19–18, 16–10, 18–15
TBF TV - YouTube	Pts: Fraser 17; Rebs: Ji-su 13; Asts: Vanloo 5 PIR: Ji-su 20	Boxscore; Report	Pts: Aokuso 14; Rebs: Sutton 10; Asts: Sutton 4 PIR: Sutton 11	Arena: Sinan Erdem Dome; Referees: Burak Yılmaz, Hakan Gerey, Melikşah Mercan

13 October 2024 3	Fenerbahçe Opet	82–73	Galatasaray Çağdaş Faktoring	Istanbul, Turkey
19:00 TRT (UTC+3)	Scoring by quarter: 16–18, 26–20, 20–13, 20–22
TBF TV - YouTube	Pts: Meesseman 22; Rebs: Meesseman 8 Asts: Williams, Allemand 7 PIR: Meesseman 28	Boxscore; Report	Pts: Fraser 26; Rebs: Fraser 6 Asts: Vanloo 6 PIR: Fraser 23	Arena: Fenerbahçe Metro Enerji Spor Salonu; Referees: Ali Şakacı, Barış Turgut, Seda Esen

20 October 2024 4	Galatasaray Çağdaş Faktoring	81–58	Melikgazi Kayseri Basketbol	Ataköy, Istanbul, Turkey
13:00 TRT (UTC+3)	Scoring by quarter: 20–18, 20–17, 18–16, 23–7
TBF TV - YouTube	Pts: Fitik, Hollingsworth 12; Rebs: Yıldızhan 12; Asts: Vanloo 6 PIR: Yıldızhan 20	Boxscore; Report	Pts: Fall 24; Rebs: Fall 24; Asts: Williams 5 PIR: Fall 44	Arena: Sinan Erdem Dome; Referees: Mesut Öztürk, Metehan Alaçam, Mustafa Gürhan Soysal

27 October 2024 5	Bodrum Basketbol Spor Kulübü	60–78	Galatasaray Çağdaş Faktoring	Muğla, Turkey
16:00 TRT (UTC+3)	Scoring by quarter: 18–20, 14–25, 17–12, 11–21
TBF TV - YouTube	Pts: Yueru 17; Rebs: Krajišnik 12; Asts: Bilgiç 9 PIR: Bilgiç 19	Boxscore; Report	Pts: Fraser 21; Rebs: Fraser 7 Asts: Vanloo 9 PIR: Vanloo 19	Arena: Bodrum Spor Salonu; Attendance: 500; Referees: Özlem Yalman, Atakan Kaymak, Nagehan Şeyda Kurden Aktaş

6	Bye

14 November 2024 7	ÇBK Mersin	69–71	Galatasaray Çağdaş Faktoring	Yenişehir, Mersin, Turkey
18:30 TRT (UTC+3)	Scoring by quarter: 24–17, 18–15, 14–17, 12–22
TBF TV - YouTube	Pts: Howard 25; Rebs: Rupert 12; Asts: Fauthoux 10; PIR: Rupert 23	Boxscore; Report	Pts: Fraser 17; Rebs: Hollingsworth 11; Asts: Vanloo 12; PIR: Hollingsworth 20	Arena: Servet Tazegül Arena; Referees: Hüseyin Çelik, Yiğit Emre Şimşek, Barış Burak Durmuş

17 November 2024 8	Galatasaray Çağdaş Faktoring	84–78(OT)	Nesibe Aydın	Ataköy, Istanbul, Turkey
18:00 TRT (UTC+3)	Scoring by quarter: 15–15, 14–17, 20–19, 17–15, Overtime: 18–12
TBF TV - YouTube	Pts: Ji-su, Fraser 20; Rebs: Vanloo 11; Asts: Vanloo 12; PIR: Vanloo 25	Boxscore; Report	Pts: Wallace 26; Rebs: Nared 12; Asts: Wheeler 5 PIR: three players 22	Arena: Sinan Erdem Dome; Referees: Polat Parlak, Sertan Kırklar, Ömer Sarı

25 November 2024 9	Beşiktaş	71–74	Galatasaray Çağdaş Faktoring	Beşiktaş, Istanbul, Turkey
18:00 TRT (UTC+3)	Scoring by quarter: 17–14, 24–17, 20–25, 10–18
TBF TV - YouTube	Pts: Fagbenle 18; Rebs: Krajišnik 9 Asts: Bayram 5 PIR: Fagbenle 26	Boxscore; Report	Pts: Fraser 23; Rebs: Yueru, Fraser 9 Asts: Vanloo 5 PIR: Fraser 22	Arena: BJK Akatlar Arena; Referees: Fatih Arslanoğlu, Yiğit Gönültaş, Batuhan Mert Gül

1 December 2024 10	Galatasaray Çağdaş Faktoring	90–73	Danilo's Pizza	Ataköy, Istanbul, Turkey
16:00 TRT (UTC+3)	Scoring by quarter: 29–20, 17–25, 24–9, 20–19
TBF TV - YouTube	Pts: Fraser 23; Rebs: Vanloo 9 Asts: Vanloo 14; PIR: Vanloo 32	Boxscore; Report	Pts: Páleníková 17; Rebs: Walker 12; Asts: Henderson 5 PIR: Páleníková 19	Arena: Sinan Erdem Dome; Attendance: 100; Referees: Zafer Yılmaz, Ali Osman Kanık, Gündoğan Ali Balaban

7 December 2024 11	Botaş	67–73	Galatasaray Çağdaş Faktoring	Altındağ, Ankara, Turkey
16:30 TRT (UTC+3)	Scoring by quarter: 19–17, 17–19, 14–21, 17–16
TBF TV - YouTube	Pts: Dantas 17; Rebs: Cave 8 Asts: Akbaş, Allen 5 PIR: Cave 19	Boxscore; Report	Pts: Vanloo 15; Rebs: Fraser 6 Asts: Vanloo 6 PIR: Vanloo 19	Arena: Ankara Arena; Referees: Kerem Baki, Ahmet Taner İbin, Mustafa Çeltiker

December 2024 12	Galatasaray Çağdaş Faktoring	Cancelled	Zonguldak Spor Basket 67
Note: Zonguldak Spor Basket 67 team announced that it withdrew from the league.

21 December 2024 13	Emlak Konut	60–58	Galatasaray Çağdaş Faktoring	Başakşehir, Istanbul, Turkey
14:00 TRT (UTC+3)	Scoring by quarter: 9–18, 15–16, 13–12, 23–12
TBF TV - YouTube	Pts: Thomas 19; Rebs: Parks 13; Asts: Parks 4 PIR: Parks 15	Boxscore; Report	Pts: Fraser 13; Rebs: Yueru 10; Asts: Vanloo 9 PIR: Fitik, Yueru 16	Arena: Başakşehir Spor Kompleksi; Referees: Ahmet Tatlıcı, Batuhan Mert Gül, Sami İrek

26 December 2024 14	Galatasaray Çağdaş Faktoring	92–68	İlkem Yapı Tarsus Spor	Ataköy, Istanbul, Turkey
20:00 TRT (UTC+3)	Scoring by quarter: 28–16, 15–12, 25–19, 24–21
TBF TV - YouTube	Pts: Yueru 22; Rebs: Yueru 7 Asts: Fraser 8 PIR: Yueru 26	Boxscore; Report	Pts: Sheppard 19; Rebs: Alleyne 11; Asts: Sheppard 7 PIR: Alleyne 24	Arena: Sinan Erdem Dome; Referees: Tolga Edis, Yarkın Keskin, Süleyman Tepe

29 December 2024 15	OGM Ormanspor	58–80	Galatasaray Çağdaş Faktoring	Yenimahalle, Ankara, Turkey
18:00 TRT (UTC+3)	Scoring by quarter: 13–26, 12–16, 14–19, 19–19
TBF TV - YouTube	Pts: Kurtulmuş 17; Rebs: Kurtulmuş 9 Asts: Kurtulmuş, Berger 5 PIR: Kurtulmuş, Aokuso 17	Boxscore; Report	Pts: Vanloo 21; Rebs: Fraser 14; Asts: Vanloo 10; PIR: Vanloo 31	Arena: M. Sait Zarifoğlu Spor Salonu; Referees: Alper Altuğ Köselerli, Burak Durmuş, Oğuzhan Güzel

4 January 2025 16	Galatasaray Çağdaş Faktoring	61–65	Fenerbahçe Opet	Ataköy, Istanbul, Turkey
18:00 TRT (UTC+3)	Scoring by quarter: 22–14, 14–23, 19–11, 6–17
TBF TV - YouTube	Pts: Vanloo 15; Rebs: three players 8 Asts: Vanloo 7 PIR: Vanloo 18	Boxscore; Report	Pts: Charles 24; Rebs: Charles, Meesseman 7 Asts: Charles 7 PIR: Charles 33	Arena: Sinan Erdem Dome; Referees: Kerem Baki, Turgut Işık, Mehmet Burak Anlatıcı

12 January 2025 17	Melikgazi Kayseri Basketbol	91–92	Galatasaray Çağdaş Faktoring	Kocasinan, Kayseri, Turkey
14:00 TRT (UTC+3)	Scoring by quarter: 25–22, 17–16, 19–31, 30–23
TBF TV - YouTube	Pts: Dangerfield 25; Rebs: Fall 8 Asts: Dangerfield 8 PIR: Dangerfield 34	Boxscore; Report	Pts: Vanloo 28; Rebs: Yueru 6 Asts: Vanloo 10; PIR: Vanloo 35	Arena: Kadir Has Spor Salonu; Referees: Tolga Akkuşoğlu, Cemil Uygül, Almina Kocabaş

18 January 2025 18	Galatasaray Çağdaş Faktoring	100–27	Bodrum Basketbol Spor Kulübü	Ataköy, Istanbul, Turkey
14:00 TRT (UTC+3)	Scoring by quarter: 25–6, 23–9, 31–10, 21–2
TBF TV - YouTube	Pts: Cora 17; Rebs: Yueru 10; Asts: Vanloo 6 PIR: Šteinberga 24	Boxscore; Report	Pts: Tekin, Tüzün 7 Rebs: three players 5 Asts: Jones, Tekin 2 PIR: Tüzün 4	Arena: Sinan Erdem Dome; Referees: Ziya Özorhon, Burak Aktaş, Fatih Kurt

19	Bye

1 February 2025 20	Galatasaray Çağdaş Faktoring	57–60	ÇBK Mersin	Ataköy, Istanbul, Turkey
18:00 TRT (UTC+3)	Scoring by quarter: 13–16, 15–20, 14–8, 15–16
TBF TV - YouTube	Pts: Fraser 18; Rebs: Zandalasini 9 Asts: Vanloo 8 PIR: Fraser 17	Boxscore; Report	Pts: Anderson 22; Rebs: Araujo, Rupert 7 Asts: Bilgiç 5 PIR: Rupert 10	Arena: Sinan Erdem Dome; Referees: Kaan Büyükçil, Turgut Işık, Yiğit Gönültaş

13 February 2025 21	Nesibe Aydın	73–97	Galatasaray Çağdaş Faktoring	Ankara, Turkey
16:00 TRT (UTC+3)	Scoring by quarter: 25–15, 11–32, 18–31, 19–19
TBF TV - YouTube	Pts: Wallace 27; Rebs: Wallace 9 Asts: Wheeler 10; PIR: Wallace 32	Boxscore; Report	Pts: Günay 21; Rebs: Günay, Ji-su 7 Asts: Vanloo 9 PIR: Günay 26	Arena: TOBB ETÜ Spor Salonu; Referees: Aydın Karaçam, Ramazan Sezer Baran, Hüseyin Çamcı

16 February 2025 22	Galatasaray Çağdaş Faktoring	74–80	Beşiktaş	Zeytinburnu, Istanbul, Turkey
18:00 TRT (UTC+3)	Scoring by quarter: 20–30, 20–17, 21–16, 13–17
TBF TV - YouTube	Pts: Vanloo 17; Rebs: Šteinberga 15; Asts: Erdoğan, Vanloo 5 PIR: Šteinberga 21	Boxscore; Report	Pts: Evans 23; Rebs: Bayram 21; Asts: Winterburn 7 PIR: Evans 23	Arena: Basketbol Gelişim Merkezi; Referees: Yener Yılmaz, Münevver Özemre, Barış Turgut

23 February 2025 23	Danilo's Pizza	63–78	Galatasaray Çağdaş Faktoring	İzmit, Turkey
16:00 TRT (UTC+3)	Scoring by quarter: 17–20, 21–17, 17–25, 8–16
TBF TV - YouTube	Pts: Mompremier 19; Rebs: Henderson 6 Asts: Henderson 6 PIR: Henderson 22	Boxscore; Report	Pts: Yueru 18; Rebs: Šteinberga 12; Asts: Vanloo 8 PIR: Yueru 26	Arena: Şehit Polis Recep Topaloğlu Sports Hall; Referees: Seher Ayşe Nur Yazıcıoğlu, Göksun Öz, Erdoğan Çelebi

1 March 2025 24	Galatasaray Çağdaş Faktoring	80–67	Botaş	Ataköy, Istanbul, Turkey
16:00 TRT (UTC+3)	Scoring by quarter: 21–19, 20–18, 18–21, 21–9
TBF TV - YouTube	Pts: Yueru 19; Rebs: Yueru 9 Asts: Vanloo 9 PIR: Yueru 27	Boxscore; Report	Pts: Duman 23; Rebs: Cuic 8 Asts: Allen 5 PIR: Duman 23	Arena: Sinan Erdem Dome; Referees: Murat Ciner, Önder Yılmaz, Batuhan Mert Gül

March 2025 25	Zonguldak Spor Basket 67	Cancelled	Galatasaray Çağdaş Faktoring
Note: Zonguldak Spor Basket 67 team announced that it withdrew from the league.

15 March 2025 26	Galatasaray Çağdaş Faktoring	68–56	Emlak Konut	Ataköy, Istanbul, Turkey
15:00 TRT (UTC+3)	Scoring by quarter: 17–22, 12–14, 19–14, 20–6
TBF TV - YouTube	Pts: Yueru 23; Rebs: Yueru 11; Asts: Vanloo 8 PIR: Yueru 29	Boxscore; Report	Pts: Ndour-Fall 20; Rebs: Ndour-Fall 9 Asts: Thomas, Çidal 5 PIR: Ndour-Fall 22	Arena: Sinan Erdem Dome; Referees: Mehmet Şahin, Orkun Yurttaş, Nihat Çetin

==== Playoffs ====
===== Quarterfinals =====
Win Loss

27 March 2025 1	Galatasaray Çağdaş Faktoring	87–64 (Series: 1–0)	Botaş	Ataköy, Istanbul, Turkey
15:30 TRT (UTC+3)	Scoring by quarter: 26–13, 20–19, 20–14, 21–18
TBF TV - YouTube	Pts: Šteinberga 16; Rebs: Šteinberga, Yueru 12; Asts: Vanloo 10; PIR: Šteinberga 26	Boxscore; Report	Pts: Allen 16; Rebs: Cave 7 Asts: Allen 3 PIR: Cave 18	Arena: Sinan Erdem Dome; Referees: Özlem Yalman, Ahmet Kemal Digilli, Özkan Talo

29 March 2025 2	Botaş	70–84 (Series: 0–2)	Galatasaray Çağdaş Faktoring	Altındağ, Ankara, Turkey
16:30 TRT (UTC+3)	Scoring by quarter: 18–25, 16–20, 16–20, 20–19
TBF TV - YouTube	Pts: Allen 23; Rebs: Cuic, Cave 6 Asts: three players 3 PIR: Allen 17	Boxscore; Report	Pts: Cora 17; Rebs: Yueru 15; Asts: Vanloo 11; PIR: Yueru 28	Arena: Ankara Arena; Referees: Yener Yılmaz, Nihat Çetin, Erdoğan Çelebi

===== Semifinals =====
Win Loss

2 April 2025 1	ÇBK Mersin	83–78 (Series: 1–0)	Galatasaray Çağdaş Faktoring	Yenişehir, Mersin, Turkey
18:00 TRT (UTC+3)	Scoring by quarter: 20–17, 22–17, 19–19, 22–25
TBF TV - YouTube	Pts: Johannès 29; Rebs: Johannès 8 Asts: Rupert 10; PIR: Johannès 30	Boxscore; Report	Pts: Vanloo 15; Rebs: Šteinberga 10; Asts: Vanloo 7 PIR: Vanloo 18	Arena: Servet Tazegül Arena; Referees: Mehmet Şahin, Önder Yılmaz, Nagehan Şeyda Kurden Aktaş

4 April 2025 2	Galatasaray Çağdaş Faktoring	61–74 (Series: 0–2)	ÇBK Mersin	Ataköy, Istanbul, Turkey
18:30 TRT (UTC+3)	Scoring by quarter: 18–17, 11–17, 20–27, 12–13
TBF TV - YouTube	Pts: Vanloo 10; Rebs: Šteinberga 7 Asts: Vanloo 7 PIR: Vanloo 14	Boxscore; Report	Pts: Carleton 25; Rebs: McCowan 8 Asts: Anderson 7 PIR: Carleton 29	Arena: Sinan Erdem Dome; Referees: Can Mavisu, Orkun Yurttaş, Münevver Özemre

=== EuroCup Women ===
==== Regular season ====
===== Group J =====
Pos	Team	Pld	W	L	PF	PA	PD	Pts	Qualification	GAL	FER	BRN	SPO
1	(Turkey) Galatasaray Cagdas Faktoring	6	5	1	514	363	+151	11 (Note: Galatasaray Cagdas Faktoring 152–139 Baxi Ferrol)	Play-off Round 1	—	69–73	110–62	84–52
2	(Spain) Baxi Ferrol	6	5	1	455	353	+102	11	Play-off Round 1	66–83	—	79–59	82–45
3	(Czech Republic) KP TANY Brno	6	2	4	375	466	−91	8		66–92	59–73	—	56–49
4	(Portugal) Sportiva/AzorisHotels	6	0	6	291	453	−162	6		44–76	38–82	63–73	—

Source: FIBA
Legend: Blue = home team win; Red = away team win.
Rules for classification: 1) Points; 2) Head-to-head record; 3) Head-to-head point differential. 4) General point differential 5) Points scored

==== Results summary ====
Overall						Home					Away				
Pld	W	L	PF	PA	PD	W	L	PF	PA	PD	W	L	PF	PA	PD
6	5	1	514	363	+151	2	1	263	187	+76	3	0	251	176	+75

Last updated: November 27, 2024.
Source: FIBA

==== Results by round ====
Round	1	2	3	4	5	6
Ground	A	H	A	H	A	H
Result	W	W	W	L	W	W
Position	1	1	1	1	1	1

Updated to match(es) played on November 29, 2024. Source: FIBA
A = Away; H = Home; W = Win; L = Loss

==== Matches ====
9 October 2024 1	BAXI Ferrol (Spain)	66–83	(Turkey) Galatasaray Çağdaş Faktoring	Ferrol, Spain
21:00 TRT (UTC+3)	Scoring by quarter: 26–17, 9–21, 22–13, 9–32
Youtube / FIBA TV	Pts: Collins, Ricart 15; Rebs: Ricart, Millán 6 Asts: Mataix 7 PIR: three players 11	Boxscore; Report	Pts: Fraser 21; Rebs: Ji-su 11; Asts: Erdoğan 6 PIR: Fraser 26	Arena: Polideportivo A Malata; Attendance: 1,473; Referees: Pierre Landy (FRA), Kenny Jeanmonod (SUI), Andžej Urbanovič (LTU)

16 October 2024 2	Galatasaray Çağdaş Faktoring (Turkey)	84–52	(Portugal) Sportiva/AzorisHotels	Zeytinburnu, Istanbul, Turkey
20:00 TRT (UTC+3)	Scoring by quarter: 28–11, 16–13, 16–20, 24–8
Youtube / FIBA TV	Pts: Fitik 23; Rebs: Hollingsworth 9 Asts: Vanloo 8 PIR: Fitik 28	Boxscore; Report	Pts: Scott 17; Rebs: Ada 10; Asts: Serralheiro 4 PIR: Ada 14	Arena: Basketball Development Centre; Attendance: 1,500; Referees: Haris Bijedic (BIH), Edison Gjoni (ALB), Balazs Meszaros (HUN)

23 October 2024 3	KP TANY Brno (Czech Republic)	66–92	(Turkey) Galatasaray Çağdaş Faktoring	Brno, Czech Republic
18:00 TRT (UTC+3)	Scoring by quarter: 27–24, 14–26, 10–26, 15–16
Youtube / FIBA TV	Pts: Kopecká 23; Rebs: Kopecká 9 Asts: Malíková 4 PIR: Kopecká 27	Boxscore; Report	Pts: Fraser 23; Rebs: Fraser 8 Asts: Vanloo 8 PIR: Fraser 29	Arena: Sportovní hala Vodova; Attendance: 1,000; Referees: Amalia Marchis (ROU), Nemanja Vlahovic (SRB), Diana Lapanovic (SLO)

30 October 2024 4	Galatasaray Çağdaş Faktoring (Turkey)	69–73	(Spain) BAXI Ferrol	Zeytinburnu, Istanbul, Turkey
20:00 TRT (UTC+3)	Scoring by quarter: 14–23, 16–16, 20–15, 19–19
Youtube / FIBA TV	Pts: Fraser 13; Rebs: Fraser 10; Asts: Vanloo 8 PIR: Fraser 21	Boxscore; Report	Pts: Millán 24; Rebs: Morro 7 Asts: Melia 6 PIR: Millán 21	Arena: Basketball Development Centre; Attendance: 2,203; Referees: Alin Faur (ROU), Xhelal Mumini (KOS), Primoz Pipan (SLO)

22 November 2024 5	Sportiva/AzorisHotels (Portugal)	44–76	(Turkey) Galatasaray Çağdaş Faktoring	Ponta Delgada, Portugal
00:30 TRT (UTC+3)	Scoring by quarter: 16–28, 4–14, 11–17, 13–17
Youtube / FIBA TV	Pts: Lewis 19; Rebs: Soares 11; Asts: Serralheiro 3 PIR: Lewis 18	Boxscore; Report	Pts: Ji-su 16; Rebs: Ji-su 8 Asts: Vanloo 4 PIR: Ji-su 24	Arena: Pavilhão Sidónio Serpa; Attendance: 400; Referees: Andžej Urbanovič (LTU), Rafiks Misirovs (LAT), Martin van Hoye (BEL)

27 November 2024 6	Galatasaray Çağdaş Faktoring (Turkey)	110–62	(Czech Republic) KP TANY Brno	Ataköy, Istanbul, Turkey
20:00 TRT (UTC+3)	Scoring by quarter: 28–18, 30–22, 27–9, 25–13
Youtube / FIBA TV	Pts: Fraser 22; Rebs: Zandalasini, Yueru 9 Asts: Vanloo 8 PIR: Yueru 25	Boxscore; Report	Pts: Galíčková 15; Rebs: Šotolová 4 Asts: four players 3 PIR: Galíčková 15	Arena: Sinan Erdem Dome; Attendance: 1,500; Referees: Ilias Karpanos (GRE), Alija Ferevski (MKD), Megaklis - Konstantinos Marinakis (GRE)

==== Play-Off Round 1 ====
Win Loss

11 December 2024 1	ŽKK Crvena zvezda (Serbia)	72–95	(Turkey) Galatasaray Çağdaş Faktoring	Belgrade, Serbia
19:00 TRT (UTC+3)	Scoring by quarter: 21–29, 10–25, 21–20, 20–21
Youtube / FIBA TV	Pts: Katanić 19; Rebs: Potter 5 Asts: I.Katanić, A.Katanić 4 PIR: A.Katanić 23	Boxscore; Report	Pts: Vanloo 23; Rebs: Šteinberga, Hollingsworth 7 Asts: Vanloo 9 PIR: Vanloo 28	Arena: Železnik Hall; Attendance: 100; Referees: Ciprian Stoica (ROU), Peter Zenis (SVK), Viktor Nagy (HUN)

18 December 2024 2	Galatasaray Çağdaş Faktoring (Turkey)	82–75 (177–147 agg.)	(Serbia) ŽKK Crvena zvezda	Ataköy, Istanbul, Turkey
20:00 TRT (UTC+3)	Scoring by quarter: 23–16, 22–21, 17–27, 20–11
Youtube / FIBA TV	Pts: Yueru 24; Rebs: Yueru 11; Asts: Vanloo 9 PIR: Yueru 28	Boxscore; Report	Pts: Radić 20; Rebs: Potter 8 Asts: Katanić 7 PIR: Williams 22	Arena: Sinan Erdem Dome; Attendance: 2,150; Referees: Ritvars Helmsteins (LAT), Alin Faur (ROU), Emmouil Tsolakos (GRE)

==== Round of 16 ====
Win Loss

9 January 2025 1	Galatasaray Çağdaş Faktoring (Turkey)	77–72	(France) LDLC ASVEL Féminin	Ataköy, Istanbul, Turkey
20:00 TRT (UTC+3)	Scoring by quarter: 18–25, 16–14, 18–21, 25–12
Youtube / FIBA TV	Pts: Fraser 16; Rebs: Fraser 8 Asts: Vanloo 9 PIR: Fraser 19	Boxscore; Report; Report	Pts: Harris 23; Rebs: Quevedo 7 Asts: Quevedo 4 PIR: Harris 23	Arena: Sinan Erdem Dome; Attendance: 500; Referees: Nemanja Ninkovic (SRB), Suzana Vujicic (MNE), Alessandro Perciavalle (ITA)

15 January 2025 2	LDLC ASVEL Féminin (France)	87–56 (159–133 agg.)	(Turkey) Galatasaray Çağdaş Faktoring	Lyon, France
22:00 TRT (UTC+3)	Scoring by quarter: 18–13, 14–18, 20–9, 35–16
Youtube / FIBA TV	Pts: Jocytė, Malonga 18; Rebs: Quevedo, Malonga 14; Asts: Harris, Pasa 5 PIR: Harris 24	Boxscore; Report; Report	Pts: Šteinberga 15; Rebs: Yueru 5 Asts: Vanloo 5 PIR: Zandalasini 11	Arena: Palais des Sports de Gerland; Attendance: 750; Referees: Ciprian Stoica (ROU), David Tomasson (ISL), Henri Hilke (FIN)

=== Turkish Women's Basketball Cup ===
==== Quarterfinals ====
Win Loss

19 March 2025 QF	Beşiktaş Boa	81–67	Galatasaray Çağdaş Faktoring	Beşiktaş, Istanbul, Turkey
18:00 TRT (UTC+3)	Scoring by quarter: 17–16, 24–17, 20–14, 20–20
	Pts: Fagbenle 27; Rebs: Bayram 8 Asts: Peterson 8 PIR: Fagbenle 28	Boxscore; Report	Pts: Vanloo 19; Rebs: Yueru 9 Asts: Vanloo 3 PIR: Erdoğan, Vanloo 11	Arena: BJK Akatlar Arena; Referees: Ali Serkan Emlek, Umut Özgün Ergün, Seda Esen

== See also ==
- Commons:Category:2024–25 Galatasaray SK (women's basketball) season
