= 2024–25 Fenerbahçe S.K. (women's basketball) season =

71st season

Fenerbahçe Opet
2024–25 season
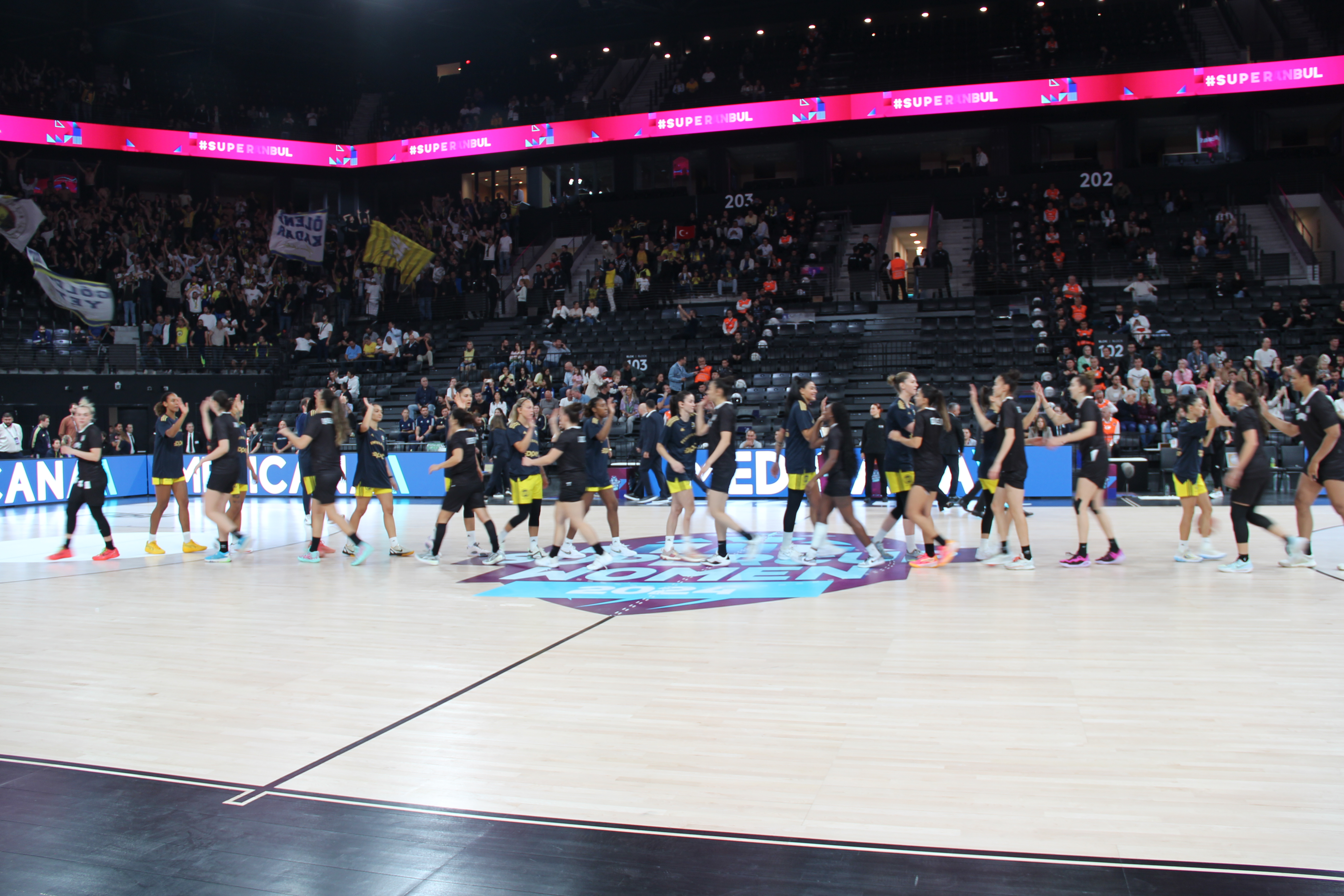
- President: Ali Koç
- Head coach: Valérie Garnier (until 15 April); Miguel Méndez (from 15 April)
- Arena: Metro Enerji Sports Hall
- Basketball Super League: 1st seed
- Playoffs: Winners
- EuroLeague Women: Third place
- Presidential Cup: Winners
- Turkish Basketball Cup: Semifinal
- FIBA Europe SuperCup: Winners

The 2024–25 season was Fenerbahçe's 71st season in the existence of the club. The team played in the Basketball Super League, Turkish Basketball Cup and EuroLeague Women.

== Club ==
=== Staff ===
Position	Staff
General Manager	(Turkey) Arzu Özyiğit
Administrative Manager	(Turkey) Derin Yener
Head Coach	(Spain) Miguel Méndez
Assistant Coach	(France) Camille Aubert
Assistant Coach	(Turkey) Semih Akdemir
Assistant Operations Support Specialist	(Turkey) Enis Bayrak
Assistant Operations Support Specialist	(Turkey) Oğulcan Türkmen
Communications and Media Officer	(Turkey) Gökhan Deniz
Ticketing Manager	(Turkey) Evren Gençoğlu
Ticketing Officer	(Turkey) Kaan Can Değerli
Strength and Conditioning Coach	(Turkey) Enis Baş
Doctor	(Turkey) Mehmet Yalçınozan
Physiotherapist	(Turkey) Ertan Yorgun
Physiotherapist	(Turkey) Efe Özgümüş
Masseur	(Turkey) İbrahim Koç
Equipment Manager	(Turkey) Latifşah Sarıca

Last updated: 20 May 2025
Source: Fenerbahce.org

== Players ==
=== Squad information ===
Fenerbahçe Opet roster
Players
Coaches

Pos.	No.	Nat.	Name	Ht.	Wt.	Age
PF	1	(Turkey)	Akarpa, Sudenur	1.84 m (6 ft 0 in)		20 – 30 June 2004
SG	2	(Turkey)	Uzun, Sevgi	1.75 m (5 ft 9 in)	64 kg (141 lb)	27 – 25 November 1997
PG	4	(Turkey)	Çakır, Olcay	1.80 m (5 ft 11 in)	60 kg (132 lb)	31 – 13 July 1993
F	5	(United States) (France)	Williams, Gabby (DC)	1.80 m (5 ft 11 in)	78 kg (172 lb)	28 – 9 September 1996
F	9	(Turkey)	Saçalır, İdil	1.81 m (5 ft 11 in)	64 kg (141 lb)	23 – 4 January 2002
PG	10	(Turkey)	Onar, Alperi (C)	1.70 m (5 ft 7 in)	57 kg (126 lb)	29 – 2 January 1996
PF	11	(Belgium)	Meesseman, Emma	1.93 m (6 ft 4 in)	87 kg (192 lb)	31 – 13 May 1993
C	13	(Serbia)	Milić, Nikolina	1.91 m (6 ft 3 in)	82 kg (181 lb)	31 – 12 April 1994
PF	15	(Turkey)	Şenyürek, Tilbe	1.88 m (6 ft 2 in)	86 kg (190 lb)	29 – 26 April 1995
C	18	(Germany)	Sabally, Nyara	1.96 m (6 ft 5 in)	93 kg (205 lb)	25 – 26 February 2000
SG	21	(United States)	McBride, Kayla	1.80 m (5 ft 11 in)	81 kg (179 lb)	32 – 25 June 1992
PG	22	(Belgium)	Allemand, Julie	1.73 m (5 ft 8 in)	67 kg (148 lb)	28 – 7 July 1996
C	25	(France)	Badiane, Marième	1.91 m (6 ft 3 in)	83 kg (183 lb)	30 – 24 November 1994
PG	30	(Turkey)	Yılmaz, Ayşe	1.71 m (5 ft 7 in)		21 – 13 August 2003
C	31	(United States)	Charles, Tina	1.96 m (6 ft 5 in)	90 kg (198 lb)	36 – 5 December 1988

Head coach

- (Spain) Miguel Méndez

Assistant coach(es)

- (France) Camille Aubert
- (Turkey) Ömer Buharalı
- (Turkey) Semih Akdemir

Team manager

- (Turkey) Arzu Özyiğit

Legend

- (C) Team captain
- (DC) Dual citizenship
- Injured

- Roster
Updated: 15 April 2025

=== Depth chart ===
Pos.	Starting 5	Bench 1	Bench 2	Bench 3
C	Tina Charles	Nyara Sabally	Marième Badiane	Nikolina Milić
PF	Emma Meesseman	Tilbe Şenyürek	Sudenur Akarpa
SF	Gabby Williams	İdil Saçalır
SG	Kayla McBride	Sevgi Uzun	Ayşe Yılmaz
PG	Julie Allemand	Alperi Onar	Olcay Çakır

=== Transactions ===
==== In ====
No.	Pos.	Nat.	Name	Age	Moving from		Ends	Date	Source
4	PG	(Turkey)	Olcay Çakır	31	CB Avenida	(Spain)	June 2025	26 July 2024	
31	C	(United States)	Tina Charles	35	Atlanta Dream	(United States)	June 2025	26 July 2024	
22	PG	(Belgium)	Julie Allemand	28	ASVEL Féminin	(France)	June 2026	26 July 2024	
5	F	(France)	Gabby Williams	27	ASVEL Féminin	(France)	June 2026	26 July 2024	
3	SG	(United States)	Ariel Atkins	28	Washington Mystics	(United States)	June 2026	4 August 2024	
18	C	(Germany)	Nyara Sabally	24	New York Liberty	(United States)	June 2025	20 December 2024	
21	SG	(United States)	Kayla McBride	32	Laces BC	(United States)	June 2025	14 February 2025	

==== Out ====
No.	Pos.	Nat.	Name	Age	Moving to		Date	Source
4	PG	(Turkey)	Duygu Özen	23	OGM Ormanspor	(Turkey)	1 July 2024	
8	PF	(Turkey)	Selin Rachel Gül	20	Galatasaray	(Turkey)	1 July 2024	
33	SF	(Latvia)	Kitija Laksa	28	PF Schio	(Italy)	3 July 2024	
12	PG	(United States)	Yvonne Anderson	34	ÇBK Mersin	(Turkey)	3 July 2024	
6	PF	(United States)	Natasha Howard	32	ÇBK Mersin	(Turkey)	5 July 2024	
23	PF	(Turkey)	Merve Aydın	30	Retired		5 July 2024	
21	SG	(United States)	Kayla McBride	32	Minnesota Lynx	(United States)	4 August 2024	
20	PF	(United States)	Napheesa Collier	27	Minnesota Lynx	(United States)	Undisclosed	
8	PG	(Montenegro)	Marija Leković	21	Valencia Basket	(Spain)	12 February 2025	
3	SG	(United States)	Ariel Atkins	28	Chicago Sky	(United States)	19 February 2025	

== Pre-season and friendlies ==
=== Friendly matches ===
7 September 2024 Friendly	Fenerbahçe Opet (Turkish Basketball Federation)	67–68	(Turkish Basketball Federation) Emlak Konut	Istanbul
	Scoring by quarter: 15–16, 11–26, 20–17, 21–9
		Boxscore		Arena: Metro Enerji Sports Hall

11 September 2024 Orman Cup	OGM Ormanspor (Turkish Basketball Federation)	67–68	(Turkish Basketball Federation) Fenerbahçe Opet	Ankara
	Scoring by quarter: 29–14, 14–19, 20–23, 6–19
		Boxscore		Arena: M. Sait Zarifoğlu Spor Salonu

12 September 2024 Orman Cup	İlkem Yapı Tarsus Spor (Turkish Basketball Federation)	94–81	(Turkish Basketball Federation) Fenerbahçe Opet	Ankara
	Scoring by quarter: 19–15, 18–22, 32–29, 25–15
		Boxscore		Arena: M. Sait Zarifoğlu Spor Salonu

14 September 2024 Orman Cup	Fenerbahçe Opet (Turkish Basketball Federation)	84–51	(Turkish Basketball Federation) Melikgazi Kayseri	Ankara
	Scoring by quarter: 25–15, 13–15, 22–12, 24–19
		Boxscore		Arena: M. Sait Zarifoğlu Spor Salonu

20 September 2024 Friendly	Fenerbahçe Opet (Turkish Basketball Federation)	107–62	(Turkish Basketball Federation) OGM Ormanspor	Istanbul
	Scoring by quarter: 17–12, 31–18, 23–19, 36–13
		Boxscore		Arena: Metro Enerji Sports Hall

== Overview ==
Competition	First match	Last match	Starting round	Final position	Record							
Competition	First match	Last match	Starting round	Final position	Pld	W	D	L	PF	PA	PD	Win %
Basketball Super League	28 September 2024	20 April 2025	Round 1	Winners	29	25	0	4	2,478	1,905	+573	86.21
EuroLeague Women	9 October 2024	13 April 2025	Round 1	Third place	16	15	0	1	1,133	938	+195	93.75
Turkish Cup	18 March 2025	21 March 2025	Quarterfinal	Semifinal	2	1	0	1	154	135	+19	50.00
Presidential Cup	4 December 2024		Final	Winners	1	1	0	0	65	64	+1	100.00
FIBA Europe SuperCup	3 October 2024		Final	Winners	1	1	0	0	79	63	+16	100.00
Total					49	43	0	6	3,909	3,105	+804	87.76

Source: Competitions

== Competitions ==
=== Presidential Cup ===
4 December 2024	Fenerbahçe Opet	65–64	Çimsa ÇBK Mersin	Ankara
19:00 TRT (UTC+3)	Scoring by quarter: 22–21, 18–11, 11–10, 14–22
	Pts: Meesseman 20; Rebs: Meesseman 9 Asts: Meesseman 7 PIR: Meesseman 33	Boxscore	Pts: Howard 21; Rebs: Howard, McCowan 10; Asts: Fauthoux 6 PIR: McCowan 16	Arena: Ankara Arena; Referees: Ali Serkan Emlek, Yücel Çilingir, Orkun Yurttaş

=== FIBA SuperCup ===
3 October 2024	Fenerbahçe (Turkey)	79–63	(Turkey) Beşiktaş	Istanbul
19:00 TRT (UTC+3)	Scoring by quarter: 16–16, 17–21, 22–14, 24–12
	Pts: Uzun 15; Rebs: Williams 7 Asts: Williams 5 PIR: Meesseman 19	Boxscore	Pts: Hillsman 20; Rebs: Hillsman 11; Asts: Mühl 9 PIR: Hillsman 28	Arena: Basketball Development Center; Referees: Yasmina Alcaraz Moreno, Amel Dahra, Veronika Obertova

=== Basketball Super League ===
==== League table ====
Pos	Team	Pld	W	L	PF	PA	PD	Pts	Qualification
1	Fenerbahçe	22	18	4	1873	1458	+415	40	Play Offs
2	ÇBK Mersin	22	17	5	1772	1506	+266	39 (Note: ÇBK Mersin 129–128 Galatasaray)	Play Offs
3	Galatasaray	22	17	5	1706	1447	+259	39	Play Offs
4	Emlak Konut	22	15	7	1705	1577	+128	37	Play Offs
5	Beşiktaş	22	11	11	1676	1602	+74	33	Play Offs
6	Botaş	22	10	12	1602	1632	−30	32 (Note: Botaş 2–0 Nesibe Aydın)	Play Offs
7	Nesibe Aydın	22	10	12	1730	1795	−65	32	Play Offs
8	Kayseri Basketbol	22	9	13	1688	1675	+13	31 (Note: Kayseri Basketbol 157–146 Ormanspor)	Play Offs
9	Ormanspor	22	9	13	1632	1657	−25	31	
10	Danilos Pizza	22	7	15	1664	1798	−134	29	
11	Tarsus Belediyesi	22	6	16	1716	1921	−205	28	Relegation to TKBL
12	Bodrum Basketbol	22	3	19	1315	2011	−696	25	Relegation to TKBL

Source: KBSL
Rules for classification: 1) Points; 2) Points difference; 3) Points scored.

==== Results summary ====
Overall						Home					Away				
Pld	W	L	PF	PA	PD	W	L	PF	PA	PD	W	L	PF	PA	PD
22	18	4	1873	1458	+415	10	1	966	750	+216	8	3	907	708	+199

Source: TBF.org.tr

==== Results by round ====
Round	1	2	3	4	5	6	7	8	9	10	11	12	13	14	15	16	17	18	19	20	21	22	23	24
Ground	H	A	H	A	H	H	A	H	H	A	H	A	A	H	A	H	A	A	H	A	A	H	A	H
Result	W	B	W	W	W	W	W	W	W	W	W	W	W	B	W	W	L	L	L	W	L	W	W	W
Position	1	7	4	3	2	1	1	1	3	1	2	1	1	1	1	1	1	1	1	1	3	3	2	1

Source: TBF.org.tr
A = Away; H = Home; B = Bye; W = Win; L = Loss

==== Matches ====
Note: All times are TRT (UTC+3) as listed by Turkish Basketball Federation.

28 Eylül 2024 1	Fenerbahçe Opet	81–56	Botaş	Istanbul
15.00	Scoring by quarter: 17–19, 21–17, 11–10, 32–10
	Pts: Meesseman 18; Rebs: Badiane 9 Asts: Uzun 9 PIR: Meesseman 29	Boxscore	Pts: Cave 25; Rebs: Cave 10; Asts: Ünal 4 PIR: Cave 29	Arena: Metro Enerji Sports Hall; Referees: Murat Ciner, Ramazan Sezer Baran, Gündoğan Ali Balaban

5 October 2024 2	Zonguldakspor Basket 67	vs.	Fenerbahçe Opet	Zonguldak
15:00
		Boxscore		Arena: Site Spor Salonu; Referees: Kerem Yılmaz, Sami İrek, Fatih Kurt

13 October 2024 3	Fenerbahçe Opet	82–73	Galatasaray	Istanbul
19.00	Scoring by quarter: 16–18, 26–20, 20–13, 20–22
	Pts: Meesseman 22; Rebs: Meesseman, Williams 8 Asts: Allemand, Williams 7 PIR: Meesseman 28	Boxscore	Pts: Fraser 26; Rebs: Fraser 6 Asts: Vanloo, Cora 2 PIR: Fraser 23	Arena: Metro Enerji Sports Hall; Referees: Ali Şakacı, Barış Turgut, Seda Esen

19 October 2024 4	Tarsus Belediyesi	71–100	Fenerbahçe Opet	Mersin
19:00	Scoring by quarter: 13–33, 19–25, 22–19, 17–23
	Pts: Alleyne 26; Rebs: Alleyne 12; Asts: Alleyne, Sheppard 5 PIR: Alleyne 34	Boxscore	Pts: Williams, Saçalır 20; Rebs: Badiane 6 Asts: Uzun 7 PIR: Williams 32	Arena: Servet Tazegül Arena; Referees: Halil Erkoç, Haldun Çoban, Buğra Çağatay Savaş

26 October 2024 5	Fenerbahçe Opet	87–67	OGM Ormanspor	Istanbul
15.00	Scoring by quarter: 28–15, 21–21, 25–13, 13–18
	Pts: Milić 21; Rebs: Milić, Çakır 6 Asts: Çakır 4 PIR: Allemand 22	Rapor	Pts: Sutton 17; Rebs: Gül 6 Asts: Sutton 8 PIR: Sutton 15	Arena: Metro Enerji Sports Hall; Referees: Emin Moğulkoç, Mustafa Çeltiker, Burak Aktaş

1 November 2024 6	Fenerbahçe Opet	80–66	Emlak Konut	Istanbul
14.00	Scoring by quarter: 23–17, 16–21, 14–12, 27–16
	Pts: Charles 22; Rebs: Charles 9 Asts: Uzun 7 PIR: Charles 28	Rapor	Pts: Ndour 17; Rebs: Macaulay 9 Asts: Thomas 5 PIR: Ndour, Macaulay 18	Arena: Metro Enerji Sports Hall; Referees: Seher Ayşe Nur Yazıcıoğlu, Ali Rıza Pinat, Melikşah Mercan

14 November 2024 7	Melikgazi Kayseri	57–89	Fenerbahçe Opet	Kayseri
17.30	Scoring by quarter: 12–19, 17–17, 11–23, 17–30
	Pts: Avcı 18; Rebs: Fall 10; Asts: Erat 14; PIR: Fall 23	Boxscore	Pts: Milić 28; Rebs: Milić 16; Asts: Onar 16; PIR: Milić 48	Arena: Kadir Has Spor Salonu; Referees: Alper Özgök, Sezer Bor, Süleyman Tepe

17 November 2024 8	Fenerbahçe Opet	100–60	Bodrum Basketbol	Istanbul
15.00	Scoring by quarter: 29–15, 28–16, 21–18, 22–11
	Pts: Meesseman 20; Rebs: Meesseman 9 Asts: Çakır 8 PIR: Meesseman 35	Boxscore	Pts: Taşar 20; Rebs: Tüzün 14; Asts: Bilgiç 6 PIR: Tüzün 21	Arena: Metro Enerji Sports Hall; Referees: Kerem Yılmaz, Almina Kocabaş, Gündoğan Ali Balaban

30 November 2024 9	Fenerbahçe Opet	82–69	ÇBK Mersin	Istanbul
16.00	Scoring by quarter: 26–24, 22–14, 17–12, 11–10
	Pts: Williams 23; Rebs: Williams, Meesseman 9 Asts: Uzun, Allemand 5 PIR: Williams 27	Boxscore	Pts: Anderson 19; Rebs: Howard 7 Asts: four players 3 PIR: Anderson 22	Arena: Metro Enerji Sports Hall; Referees: Uğur Akyıldız, Yiğit Gönültaş, Hüseyin Çamcı

7 December 2024 10	Nesibe Aydın	67–92	Fenerbahçe Opet	Ankara
15.00	Scoring by quarter: 15–18, 17–21, 12–23, 23–30
	Pts: Wallace 14; Rebs: Scherf 7 Asts: Wheeler 10; PIR: Wheeler 15	Boxscore	Pts: Williams 16; Rebs: Milić 14; Asts: Williams 6 PIR: Milić 27	Arena: TOBB Sport Hall; Referees: Murat Ciner, Sertan Kırklar, Hakkı Ünver

15 December 2024 11	Fenerbahçe Opet	83–77	Beşiktaş	Istanbul
14:30	Scoring by quarter: 23–23, 18–18, 19–12, 23–24
	Pts: Williams 24; Rebs: Williams 7 Asts: Meesseman 6 PIR: Williams 35	Boxscore	Pts: Fagbenle 28; Rebs: Fagbenle 11; Asts: Bayram 6 PIR: Fagbenle 37	Arena: Metro Enerji Sports Hall; Referees: Mehmet Şahin, Ozan Gönen, Burak Pehlivan

21 December 2024 12	Danilos Pizza	70–87	Fenerbahçe Opet	Kocaeli
16:00	Scoring by quarter: 15–23, 22–18, 17–21, 16–25
	Pts: Walker 17; Rebs: Walker 10; Asts: Henderson 9 PIR: Henderson 18	Boxscore	Pts: Badiane 21; Rebs: Badiane 13; Asts: Allemand 6 PIR: Badiane 34	Arena: Şehit Polis Recep Topaloğlu Spor Salonu; Referees: Polat Parlak, Burak Durmuş, Mustafa Gürhan Soysal

24 December 2024 13	Botaş	65–81	Fenerbahçe Opet	Ankara
18:00	Scoring by quarter: 12–18, 13–19, 21–26, 19–18
	Pts: Allen 18; Rebs: Dantas, Cave 9 Asts: Allen 5 PIR: Allen 21	Boxscore	Pts: Şenyürek 18; Rebs: Charles 7 Asts: Uzun 6 PIR: Atkins 23	Arena: Ankara Arena; Referees: Alper Gökçebel, Atakan Kaymak, Sait Nedim Çelik

14	Fenerbahçe Opet	vs.	Zonguldakspor Basket 67	Istanbul
				Arena: Metro Enerji Sports Hall

4 January 2025 15	Galatasaray	61–65	Fenerbahçe Opet	Istanbul
18:00	Scoring by quarter: 22–14, 14–23, 19–11, 6–17
	Pts: Vanloo 15; Rebs: three players 8 Asts: Vanloo 7 PIR: Vanloo 18	Boxscore	Pts: Charles 24; Rebs: Charles, Meesseman 7 Asts: Charles 7 PIR: Charles 33	Arena: Sinan Erdem Dome; Referees: Kerem Baki, Turgut Işık, Mehmet Burak Anlatıcı

11 January 2025 16	Fenerbahçe Opet	108–66	Tarsus Belediyesi	Istanbul
15:00	Scoring by quarter: 27–18, 30–14, 25–16, 26–18
	Pts: Meesseman 26; Rebs: Sabally 9 Asts: Allemand 8 PIR: Meesseman 34	Boxscore	Pts: Sheppard 17; Rebs: Alleyne 13; Asts: Alleyne 5 PIR: Alleyne 27	Arena: Metro Enerji Sports Hall; Referees: Mesut Öztürk, Ramazan Sezer Baran, Kadir Giray Esen

18 January 2025 17	OGM Ormanspor	72–59	Fenerbahçe Opet	Ankara
14:00	Scoring by quarter: 15–17, 17–14, 24–19, 16–9
	Pts: Kurtulmuş 19; Rebs: Berger 8 Asts: Berger 5 PIR: Aokuso 20	Boxscore	Pts: Milić 13; Rebs: Çakır, Badiane 6 Asts: Uzun, Onar 5 PIR: Badiane 17	Arena: M. Sait Zarifoğlu Spor Salonu; Referees: Musa Kazım Çetin, Sezer Bor, Sami İrek

25 January 2025 18	Emlak Konut	73–70	Fenerbahçe Opet	Istanbul
15:00	Scoring by quarter: 17–22, 14–13, 15–15, 27–20
	Pts: Ndour 21; Rebs: Thomas 8 Asts: Thomas 8 PIR: Parks 27	Boxscore	Pts: Meesseman 16; Rebs: Meesseman 9 Asts: Meesseman 9 PIR: Meesseman 32	Arena: Başakşehir Spor Kompleksi; Referees: Ahmet Tatlıcı, Fatih Güler, Özkan Talo

31 January 2025 19	Fenerbahçe Opet	67–75	Melikgazi Kayseri	Istanbul
15:00	Scoring by quarter: 16–13, 13–26, 17–17, 21–19
	Pts: Şenyürek 21; Rebs: Milić 8 Asts: Uzun 10; PIR: Şenyürek 29	Boxscore	Pts: Dangerfield, Powers 29; Rebs: Powers 13; Asts: three players 3 PIR: Powers 33	Arena: Metro Enerji Sports Hall; Referees: Özge Şentürk Bayraktar, Benhür İncel, Erdoğan Çelebi

12 February 2025 20	Bodrum Basketbol	37–107	Fenerbahçe Opet	Muğla
17:00	Scoring by quarter: 12–32, 13–24, 4–21, 8–30
	Pts: Güler 10; Rebs: Tüzün 9 Asts: Güler 5 PIR: Tüzün 10	Boxscore	Pts: Badiane 30; Rebs: Milić 14; Asts: Çakır 9 PIR: Badiane 45	Arena: Bodrum Spor Salonu; Referees: Yiğit Gönültaş, Ahmet Murat Arıkanlı, Burak Aktaş

22 February 2025 21	ÇBK Mersin	72–66	Fenerbahçe Opet	Mersin
16:00	Scoring by quarter: 24–13, 17–19, 17–10, 14–24
	Pts: Howard 17; Rebs: Howard 12; Asts: Carleton 7 PIR: Howard 26	Boxscore	Pts: Williams 27; Rebs: Badiane 9 Asts: Allemand 5 PIR: Williams 30	Arena: Servet Tazegül Arena; Referees: Murat Ciner, Aydın Karaçam, Fatih Güler

1 March 2025 22	Fenerbahçe Opet	98–67	Nesibe Aydın	Istanbul
17:00	Scoring by quarter: 31–22, 23–12, 22–17, 22–16
	Pts: Williams 30; Rebs: Meesseman 12; Asts: Allemand, Uzun 7 PIR: Williams 33	Boxscore	Pts: Nared 18; Rebs: Scherf 9 Asts: Wheeler 7 PIR: Scherf 20	Arena: Metro Enerji Sports Hall; Referees: Mesut Öztürk, Niyazi Yasin Kahraman, Metehan Alaçam

9 March 2025 23	Beşiktaş	63–91	Fenerbahçe Opet	Istanbul
14:00	Scoring by quarter: 18–19, 15–22, 13–27, 17–23
	Pts: Peterson 15; Rebs: Bayram, Başaran 8 Asts: Lazić, Peterson 6 PIR: Bayram, Başaran 16	Boxscore	Pts: Williams 25; Rebs: Meesseman 10; Asts: Meesseman 9 PIR: Meesseman 31	Arena: Akatlar Arena; Referees: Kerem Baki, Yücel Çilingir, Erdoğan Çelebi

14 March 2025 24	Fenerbahçe Opet	98–74	Danilos Pizza	Istanbul
15:00	Scoring by quarter: 19–28, 23–25, 31–12, 25–9
	Pts: Williams 27; Rebs: Sabally 9 Asts: Allemand 8 PIR: Sabally 31	Boxscore	Pts: Cooke 18; Rebs: Mompremier 12; Asts: Henderson 10; PIR: Mompremier 20	Arena: Metro Enerji Sports Hall; Referees: Mehmet Serdal Ünal, Yarkın Keskin, Kadir Giray Esen

==== Quarterfinals ====
26 March 2025 1	Fenerbahçe Opet	98–74 (Series: 1–0)	Melikgazi Kayseri	Istanbul
14:00	Scoring by quarter: 22–16, 15–22, 36–10, 25–26
	Pts: McBride 21; Rebs: Sabally 12; Asts: Meesseman 9 PIR: Meesseman, Sabally 27	Boxscore	Pts: Dangerfield 19; Rebs: Fall 13; Asts: Powers 5 PIR: Fall 30	Arena: Metro Enerji Sports Hall; Referees: Duhan Köyiçi, İsmail Binbir, Samet Biner

28 March 2025 2	Melikgazi Kayseri	56–98 (Series: 0–2)	Fenerbahçe Opet	Kayseri
15:00	Scoring by quarter: 17–25, 15–34, 12–21, 12–18
	Pts: Dangerfield 18; Rebs: Avcı 9 Asts: three players 3 PIR: Avcı 17	Boxscore	Pts: four players 14; Rebs: Meesseman 6 Asts: Meesseman 8 PIR: Meesseman 27	Arena: Kadir Has Spor Salonu; Referees: Tolga Edis, Ahmet Taner İbin, Batuhan Mert Gül

==== Semifinals ====
1 April 2025 1	Fenerbahçe Opet	91–42 (Series: 1–0)	Beşiktaş	Istanbul
18:00	Scoring by quarter: 27–14, 29–7, 19–12, 16–9
	Pts: McBride 21; Rebs: Sabally 10; Asts: Onar 6 PIR: McBride 24	Boxscore	Pts: Fagbenle 19; Rebs: Fagbenle 10; Asts: Özışık 6 PIR: Fagbenle 15	Arena: Metro Enerji Sports Hall; Referees: Ali Serkan Emlek, Umut Özgün Ergün, Melikşah Mercan

3 April 2025 2	Beşiktaş	73–77 (Series: 0–2)	Fenerbahçe Opet	Istanbul
16:00	Scoring by quarter: 14–21, 21–15, 20–21, 18–20
	Pts: Krajišnik 19; Rebs: Krajišnik 9 Asts: Lazić 7 PIR: Krajišnik 26	Boxscore	Pts: McBride 22; Rebs: Charles 14; Asts: McBride 6 PIR: Charles 26	Arena: Akatlar Arena; Referees: Yener Yılmaz, Aydın Karaçam, Ahmet Kemal Digilli

==== Finals ====
16 April 2025 1	Fenerbahçe Opet	77–70 (Series: 1–0)	ÇBK Mersin	Istanbul
19:00	Scoring by quarter: 21–20, 25–17, 14–15, 17–18
	Pts: Meesseman 30; Rebs: Meesseman, Şenyürek 9 Asts: Onar 7 PIR: Meesseman 40	Boxscore	Pts: Howard 16; Rebs: McCowan 11; Asts: Anderson 7 PIR: McCowan 18	Arena: Metro Enerji Sports Hall; Referees: Emin Moğulkoç, Seher Ayşe Nur Yazıcıoğlu, Yarkın Keskin

18 April 2025 2	Fenerbahçe Opet	85–54 (Series: 2–0)	ÇBK Mersin	Istanbul
19:00	Scoring by quarter: 22–21, 23–15, 26–9, 14–9
	Pts: Meesseman 22; Rebs: Meesseman 13; Asts: Meesseman 8 PIR: Meesseman 39	Boxscore	Pts: Howard 19; Rebs: Howard, McCowan 5 Asts: Johannès 4 PIR: Howard 16	Arena: Metro Enerji Sports Hall; Referees: Can Mavisu, Kerem Yılmaz, Ozan Gönen

20 April 2025 3	ÇBK Mersin	78–79 (Series: 0–3)	Fenerbahçe Opet	Mersin
18:00	Scoring by quarter: 22–22, 24–23, 15–17, 17–17
	Pts: Rupert 22; Rebs: McCowan 11; Asts: Fauthoux 13; PIR: Rupert, McCowan 22	Boxscore	Pts: McBride 19; Rebs: Sabally 9 Asts: Williams 10; PIR: Williams 25	Arena: Servet Tazegül Arena; Referees: Hüseyin Çelik, Kaan Büyükçıl, Umut Özgün Ergün

=== EuroLeague Women ===
==== First round ====
===== Group C =====
Pos	Team	Pld	W	L	PF	PA	PD	Pts	Qualification
1	(Turkey) Fenerbahçe Opet	6	6	0	520	409	+111	12	Second round
2	(Spain) Casademont Zaragoza	6	4	2	418	412	+6	10	Second round
3	(Poland) KGHM BC Polkowice	6	1	5	458	491	−33	7 (Note: KGHM BC Polkowice 173–163 ESB Villeneuve-d'Ascq)	Second round
4	(France) ESB Villeneuve-d'Ascq	6	1	5	402	486	−84	7	EuroCup Women

Source: FIBA
Rules for classification: 1) Points; 2) Points difference; 3) Points scored.

===== Results summary =====
Overall						Home					Away				
Pld	W	L	PF	PA	PD	W	L	PF	PA	PD	W	L	PF	PA	PD
6	6	0	520	409	+111	3	0	269	200	+69	3	0	251	209	+42

Source: EuroLeague Women

===== Results by round =====
Round	1	2	3	4	5	6
Ground	A	H	A	H	A	H
Result	W	W	W	W	W	W
Position	1	1	1	1	1	1

Source: EuroLeague Women
A = Away; H = Home; W = Win; L = Loss

===== Matches =====
9 October 2024 1	ESB Villeneuve-d'Ascq (France)	52–81	(Turkish Basketball Federation) Fenerbahçe Opet	Villeneuve-d'Ascq
20:00 CEST (UTC+2)	Scoring by quarter: 19–25, 6–24, 17–13, 10–19
	Pts: Leite 14; Rebs: Bone 12; Asts: Leite 6 PIR: Gueye 14	Boxscore	Pts: Meesseman 20; Rebs: Badiane 11; Asts: Allemand 10; PIR: Meesseman 26	Arena: Le Palacium; Attendance: 2,200; Referees: Jan Baloun, Martin van Hoye, Domen Krajnc

16 October 2024 2	Fenerbahçe Opet (Turkish Basketball Federation)	84–64	(Spain) Casademont Zaragoza	Istanbul
19:00 TRT (UTC+3)	Scoring by quarter: 23–9, 25–23, 23–23, 13–9
	Pts: Meesseman 22; Rebs: Meesseman 7 Asts: Williams 6 PIR: Meesseman 33	Boxscore	Pts: Pueyo 16; Rebs: Gatling 9 Asts: Ortiz 9 PIR: Gatling 17	Arena: Metro Enerji Sports Hall; Attendance: 925; Referees: Silvia Marziali, Stylianos Simeonidis, Mladen Lucic

23 October 2024 3	KGHM BC Polkowice (Poland)	88–90	(Turkish Basketball Federation) Fenerbahçe Opet	Polkowice
19:00 CEST (UTC+2)	Scoring by quarter: 20–14, 27–23, 18–26, 23–27
	Pts: Cannon 28; Rebs: Cannon 10; Asts: Peterson 8 PIR: Cannon 33	Boxscore	Pts: Meesseman 22; Rebs: Williams 7 Asts: Uzun 7 PIR: Meesseman 25	Arena: City Sports Hall Polkowice; Attendance: 550; Referees: Veronika Obertova, Nataša Dragojević, Veronika Vavrova
Note: On 4 January 2025, FIBA Europe announced that KGHM BC Polkowice had withdrawn from the competition due to financial reasons, and that all of their regular season games were voided.

29 October 2024 4	Fenerbahçe Opet (Turkish Basketball Federation)	95–75	(France) ESB Villeneuve-d'Ascq	Istanbul
19:00 TRT (UTC+3)	Scoring by quarter: 21–16, 26–23, 22–19, 26–17
	Pts: Meesseman 23; Rebs: Charles 6 Asts: Allemand 7 PIR: Meesseman 30	Boxscore	Pts: Peters 21; Rebs: Zellous 8 Asts: Paget 6 PIR: Zellous 17	Arena: Metro Enerji Sports Hall; Attendance: 950; Referees: Marius Ciulin, Radomir Vojinovic, Ritvars Helmšteins

20 November 2024 5	Casademont Zaragoza (Spain)	69–80	(Turkish Basketball Federation) Fenerbahçe Opet	Zaragoza
20:00 CET (UTC+1)	Scoring by quarter: 11–26, 11–10, 25–23, 22–21
	Pts: Pueyo 15; Rebs: Hermosa 9 Asts: Ortiz 6 PIR: Hermosa 18	Boxscore	Pts: Atkins 16; Rebs: Allemand 6 Asts: Allemand 8 PIR: Allemand 20	Arena: Pabellón Príncipe Felipe; Attendance: 4,658; Referees: Paulina Karolina Gajdosz, Petr Hrůša, Tom de Lange

27 November 2024 6	Fenerbahçe Opet (Turkish Basketball Federation)	90–61	(Poland) KGHM BC Polkowice	Istanbul
19:00 TRT (UTC+3)	Scoring by quarter: 23–17, 31–14, 27–15, 9–15
	Pts: Meesseman 13; Rebs: Badiane 9 Asts: Meesseman 9 PIR: Meesseman 28	Boxscore	Pts: Cannon 23; Rebs: Cannon 7 Asts: Gajda 9 PIR: Cannon 20	Arena: Metro Enerji Sports Hall; Attendance: 2,500; Referees: Kirile Tvauri, László Goda, Tomi Panov
Note: On 4 January 2025, FIBA Europe announced that KGHM BC Polkowice had withdrawn from the competition due to financial reasons, and that all of their regular season games were voided.

==== Second round ====
===== Group F =====
Pos	Team	Pld	W	L	PF	PA	PD	Pts	Qualification
1	(Turkey) Fenerbahçe Opet	10	10	0	823	649	+174	20	Semifinal play in
2	(Spain) Valencia Basket	10	7	3	753	732	+21	17	Semifinal play in
3	(Czech Republic) ZVVZ USK Praha	10	5	5	740	719	+21	15 (Note: ZVVZ USK Praha 140–139 Casademont Zaragoza)	Quarterfinal play in
4	(Spain) Casademont Zaragoza	10	5	5	663	680	−17	15	Quarterfinal play in
5	(Italy) Umana Reyer Venezia	10	3	7	692	736	−44	13	
6	(Poland) KGHM BC Polkowice (Note: On 4 January 2025, KGHM BC Polkowice withdrew from the competition due to financial reasons. All games involving KGHM BC Polkowice will be annulled and not count for the rankings.)	8	1	7	559	639	−80	9	Withdrew

Source: FIBA
Rules for classification: 1) Points; 2) Points difference; 3) Points scored.

===== Results summary =====
Overall						Home					Away				
Pld	W	L	PF	PA	PD	W	L	PF	PA	PD	W	L	PF	PA	PD
6	6	0	483	389	+94	3	0	253	193	+60	3	0	230	196	+34

Source: EuroLeague Women

===== Results by round =====
Round	7	8	9	10	11	12
Ground	H	A	H	A	H	A
Result	W	W	W	W	W	W
Position	1	1	1	1	1	1

Source: EuroLeague Women
A = Away; H = Home; W = Win; L = Loss

===== Matches =====
12 December 2024 7	Fenerbahçe Opet (Turkish Basketball Federation)	75–71	(Czech Republic) ZVVZ USK Praha	Istanbul
18:30 TRT (UTC+3)
	Pts: Charles 18; Rebs: Meesseman 9 Asts: Allemand 6 PIR: Williams 19	Boxscore	Pts: Jones 19; Rebs: Ayayi 12; Asts: Conde 8 PIR: Jones 23	Arena: Metro Enerji Sports Hall; Attendance: 600; Referees: Cecília Montgomery-Tóth, Viola Györgyi, Yasmina Alcaraz

18 December 2024 8	Umana Reyer Venezia (Italy)	71–79	(Turkish Basketball Federation) Fenerbahçe Opet	Venice
19:30 CET (UTC+1)	Scoring by quarter: 13–20, 16–20, 25–16, 17–20
	Pts: Kuier 24; Rebs: Kuier 12; Asts: three players 3 PIR: Kuier 30	Boxscore	Pts: Meesseman 21; Rebs: Meesseman 8 Asts: Meesseman 5 PIR: Williams 30	Arena: Palasport Taliercio; Attendance: 837; Referees: Lukasz Jankowski, Ivana Ivanovic, Elvis Binders-Coders

8 January 2025 9	Fenerbahçe Opet (Turkish Basketball Federation)	92–56	(Spain) Valencia Basket	Istanbul
19:00 TRT (UTC+3)	Scoring by quarter: 22–18, 22–8, 24–11, 24–19
	Pts: Williams 14; Rebs: Meesseman, Sabally 4 Asts: Williams, Meesseman 6 PIR: Williams 24	Boxscore	Pts: Mavunga 16; Rebs: Alexander 9 Asts: Turner 6 PIR: Fingall 11	Arena: Metro Enerji Sports Hall; Attendance: 1,000; Referees: Silvia Marziali, Jelena Tomic, Nataša Dragojević

15 January 2025 10	ZVVZ USK Praha (Czech Republic)	54–63	(Turkish Basketball Federation) Fenerbahçe Opet	Prague
19:00 CET (UTC+1)	Scoring by quarter: 18–12, 16–23, 11–15, 9–13
	Pts: Jones 12; Rebs: Jones 12; Asts: Cazorla, Ayayi 4 PIR: Jones 18	Boxscore	Pts: Meesseman 19; Rebs: Meesseman 9 Asts: Allemand 5 PIR: Meesseman 19	Arena: Královka Arena; Attendance: 1,219; Referees: Cecília Montgomery-Tóth, Viola Györgyi, Paulina Karolina Gajdosz

22 January 2025 11	Fenerbahçe Opet (Turkish Basketball Federation)	86–66	(Italy) Umana Reyer Venezia	Istanbul
19:00 TRT (UTC+3)	Scoring by quarter: 22–25, 25–8, 23–20, 16–13
	Pts: Meesseman 22; Rebs: Charles 10; Asts: Meesseman 9 PIR: Meesseman 31	Boxscore	Pts: Smalls, Kuier 15; Rebs: Kuier 8 Asts: Kuier 3 PIR: Smalls 14	Arena: Metro Enerji Sports Hall; Attendance: 650; Referees: Jelena Tomic, Veronika Obertová, Ewa Matuszewska

28 January 2025 12	Valencia Basket (Spain)	71–88	(Turkish Basketball Federation) Fenerbahçe Opet	Valencia
19:15 CET (UTC+1)	Scoring by quarter: 14–29, 17–30, 17–14, 23–15
	Pts: Flórez 17; Rebs: Alexander 7 Asts: Flórez 5 PIR: Fiebich 15	Boxscore	Pts: Williams 18; Rebs: Williams 7 Asts: Allemand 9 PIR: Allemand 28	Arena: Font de Sant Lluís; Attendance: 2,504; Referees: Cecília Montgomery-Tóth, Paulina Karolina Gajdosz, Silvia Marziali

==== Play-in ====
===== Semifinal =====
19 February 2025 1	Beretta Familia Schio (Italian Basketball Federation)	80–86	(Turkey) Fenerbahçe Opet	Schio
19:15 CET (UTC+1)	Scoring by quarter: 17–24, 13–20, 19–14, 31–28
	Pts: Sottana 24; Rebs: Juhász 7 Asts: Verona, Dojkić 5 PIR: Sottana 23	Boxscore	Pts: Meesseman 29; Rebs: Meesseman 7 Asts: Uzun 7 PIR: Meesseman 31	Arena: Palazzetto Livio Romare; Attendance: 2,400; Referees: Branimir Galić, Ewa Matuszewska, Alin Faur

26 February 2025 2	Fenerbahçe Opet (Turkey)	64–60 (150–140 agg.)	(Italian Basketball Federation) Beretta Familia Schio	Istanbul
19:00 TRT (UTC+3)	Scoring by quarter: 24–17, 18–9, 8–14, 14–20
	Pts: Meesseman 19; Rebs: Meesseman 10; Asts: Allemand 7 PIR: Meesseman 29	Boxscore	Pts: Laksa 25; Rebs: Juhász 10; Asts: Verona 6 PIR: Laksa 27	Arena: Metro Enerji Sports Hall; Attendance: 980; Referees: Paulina Karolina Gajdosz, Josip Jurcevic, Blaž Zupančič

==== Final Six ====
===== Semifinal =====
11 April 2025	Fenerbahçe Opet (Turkish Basketball Federation)	71–91	(Czech Republic) ZVVZ USK Praha	Zaragoza
17:30 CEST (UTC+2)	Scoring by quarter: 25–27, 12–19, 13–22, 21–23
	Pts: Williams 20; Rebs: Meesseman, Sabally 4 Asts: Allemand 7 PIR: Sabally, Allemand 19	Boxscore	Pts: Magbegor, Jones 16; Rebs: Magbegor 16; Asts: Oblak 8 PIR: Magbegor 29	Arena: Pabellón Príncipe Felipe; Attendance: 3,082; Referees: Ariadna Chueca, Paulina Karolina Gajdosz, Péter Praksch

===== Third place game =====
13 April 2025	Valencia Basket (Spain)	49–59	(Turkish Basketball Federation) Fenerbahçe Opet	Zaragoza
17:00 CEST (UTC+2)	Scoring by quarter: 12–8, 13–21, 18–13, 16–17
	Pts: Fiebich 15; Rebs: Mavunga 9 Asts: Turner, Fiebich 3 PIR: Turner 14	Boxscore	Pts: Meesseman 16; Rebs: Meesseman 10; Asts: Williams; PIR: Meesseman 26	Arena: Pabellón Príncipe Felipe; Attendance: 3,217; Referees: Ventsislav Velikov, Veronika Obertová, Péter Praksch

=== Turkish Basketball Cup ===
18 March 2025 QF	Nesibe Aydın	57–97	Fenerbahçe Opet	Ankara
15:00 TRT (UTC+3)	Scoring by quarter: 15–23, 14–28, 11–23, 17–23
	Pts: Nared 14; Rebs: Scherf 10; Asts: Uygül 4 PIR: Scherf 12	Boxscore	Pts: Meesseman 17; Rebs: Meesseman 9 Asts: Williams, Uzun 8 PIR: Meesseman 28	Arena: TOBB Sport Hall; Referees: Zafer Yılmaz, Orkun Yurttaş, Nagehan Şeyda Kurden Aktaş

21 March 2025 SF	Fenerbahçe Opet	57–78	ÇBK Mersin	Edirne
17:00 TRT (UTC+3)	Scoring by quarter: 13–20, 18–23, 8–21, 18–14
	Pts: Williams 27; Rebs: Williams, Charles 7 Asts: Meesseman 6 PIR: Williams 28	Boxscore	Pts: McCowan 21; Rebs: McCowan, Anderson 10; Asts: Anderson 7 PIR: McCowan 26	Arena: Edirne Yeni Kapalı Spor Salonu; Referees: Kerem Baki, Turgut Işık, Hüseyin Çamcı

== Statistics ==
Legend
GP	Games played	GS	Games started	MPG	Minutes per game
FG%	Field-goal percentage	3FG%	3-point field-goal percentage	FT%	Free-throw percentage
RPG	Rebounds per game	APG	Assists per game	SPG	Steals per game
BPG	Blocks per game	PPG	Points per game	PIR	PIR per game

Player	Left during season

=== Basketball Super League ===
Player	GP	GS	MPG	2FG%	3FG%	FT%	RPG	APG	SPG	BPG	PPG	PIR
Sudenur Akarpa	12	0	2:33	.500	.143	1.000	0.6	0	0.2	0.1	0.8	0.8
Julie Allemand	18	18	28:31	.652	.426	.933	3.6	5.2	1.4	0.1	8.4	14.4
Marième Badiane	12	12	28:59	.614	.371	.833	7.5	2.7	0.8	0.6	14.3	18.7
Selen Baş	10	0	4:24	.625	.222	1.000	0.4	0.4	0.5	0.1	1.8	2.2
Olcay Çakır	28	2	19:41	.507	.442	.735	2.1	3.1	1.1	0.1	5.5	8.0
Tina Charles	10	10	28:18	.484	.500	.929	5.9	3.1	0.8	0.4	13.1	16.2
İrem Erdik	6	0	4:21	.400	1.000	.750	0.7	0.7	0.2	0	1.7	2.2
Ece Erginay	7	0	3:56	.500	.500	.500	0.6	0.7	0.3	0	1.3	1.9
Kayla McBride	7	7	31:01	.515	.478	.867	4.0	3.4	1.3	0	16.1	17.7
Emma Meesseman	19	19	29:43	.691	.143	.900	7.4	5.7	1.8	0.6	16.6	26.7
Nikolina Milić	11	9	23:27	.562	.286	.833	7.6	1.5	1.1	0.4	13.6	16.7
Alperi Onar	20	10	20:46	.633	.435	.880	0.9	3.1	0.7	0	7.9	8.6
Nyara Sabally	8	8	23:15	.493	.286	.846	8.6	2.1	1.0	0.6	13.4	18.4
İdil Saçalır	13	0	10:50	.611	.368	.727	1.1	0.6	0.2	0.1	3.9	4.0
Tilbe Şenyürek	29	0	18:17	.524	.357	.767	4.2	1.4	0.4	0.1	7.9	9.5
Zeynep Töremiş	1	0	5:35	.667	.000	—	2.0	0	0	0	4.0	2.0
Sevgi Uzun	28	19	24:54	.500	.346	.783	2.2	4.3	1.5	0.3	8.8	10.9
Tuana Vural	2	0	5:35	.500	.500	—	2.0	0.5	0.5	0	3.5	5.0
Gabby Williams	22	22	30:19	.630	.282	.739	5.6	3.7	2.6	0.8	15.7	20.7
Ayşe Yılmaz	13	1	5:32	.214	.500	—	0.2	0.4	0.2	0	1.4	0.9
Ariel Atkins	8	8	26:09	.640	.118	.714	4.1	2.6	1.8	0.1	10	12.6
TOTAL	—			.579	.364	.814	34.3	26.1	10.0	2.4	85.5	112.9

Source: Basketbol Süper Ligi

=== EuroLeague Women ===
Player	GP	GS	MPG	2FG%	3FG%	FT%	RPG	APG	SPG	BPG	PPG	PIR
Julie Allemand	14	14	28.2	.889	.361	.875	2.3	6.3	1.6	0	7.9	15.1
Marième Badiane	14	7	14.4	.333	.307	.846	3.3	1.2	1.5	0.8	4.4	6.1
Olcay Çakır	11	0	11.2	.385	.400	.818	0.8	0.9	0.9	0	2.8	2.8
Tina Charles	14	4	18.2	.519	.357	.792	3.8	1.1	1.0	0.4	10.1	10.1
Marija Leković	4	0	2.2	1.000	—	—	0.5	0	0.3	0	0.5	1.0
Kayla McBride	2	2	32.3	.750	.800	.750	2.5	3.0	0	0	11.5	9.5
Emma Meesseman	14	14	30.0	.682	.306	.685	6.6	4.5	2.0	0.7	16.9	23.0
Nikolina Milić	10	0	9.3	.500	.000	1.000	2.5	0.6	0.8	0.3	2.7	4.0
Alperi Onar	8	0	16.1	.609	.308	.556	1.0	2.1	0.9	0	5.6	5.6
Nyara Sabally	6	3	21.7	.545	.000	.667	4.8	2.0	1.8	0.5	9.7	12.2
İdil Saçalır	1	0	10.7	1.000	1.000	.000	0	0	1.0	0	7.0	6.0
Tilbe Şenyürek	4	0	3.9	—	.250	—	1.3	0	0.3	0	0.5	1.3
Sevgi Uzun	14	8	23.8	.474	.306	.714	1.6	3.4	1.3	0.1	6.9	8.1
Gabby Williams	14	14	31.3	.585	.325	.789	5.4	3.9	1.5	0.5	13.8	19.2
Ayşe Yılmaz	1	0	0.3	—	—	—	0	0	0	0	0	0
Ariel Atkins	10	4	18.2	.500	.397	.444	2.0	1.0	1.0	0	6.6	5.6
TOTAL	—			.561	.333	.775	33.4	24.7	11.9	2.1	78.8	101.3

Source: EuroLeague Women
