= Destanni Henderson =

American basketball player (born 1999)

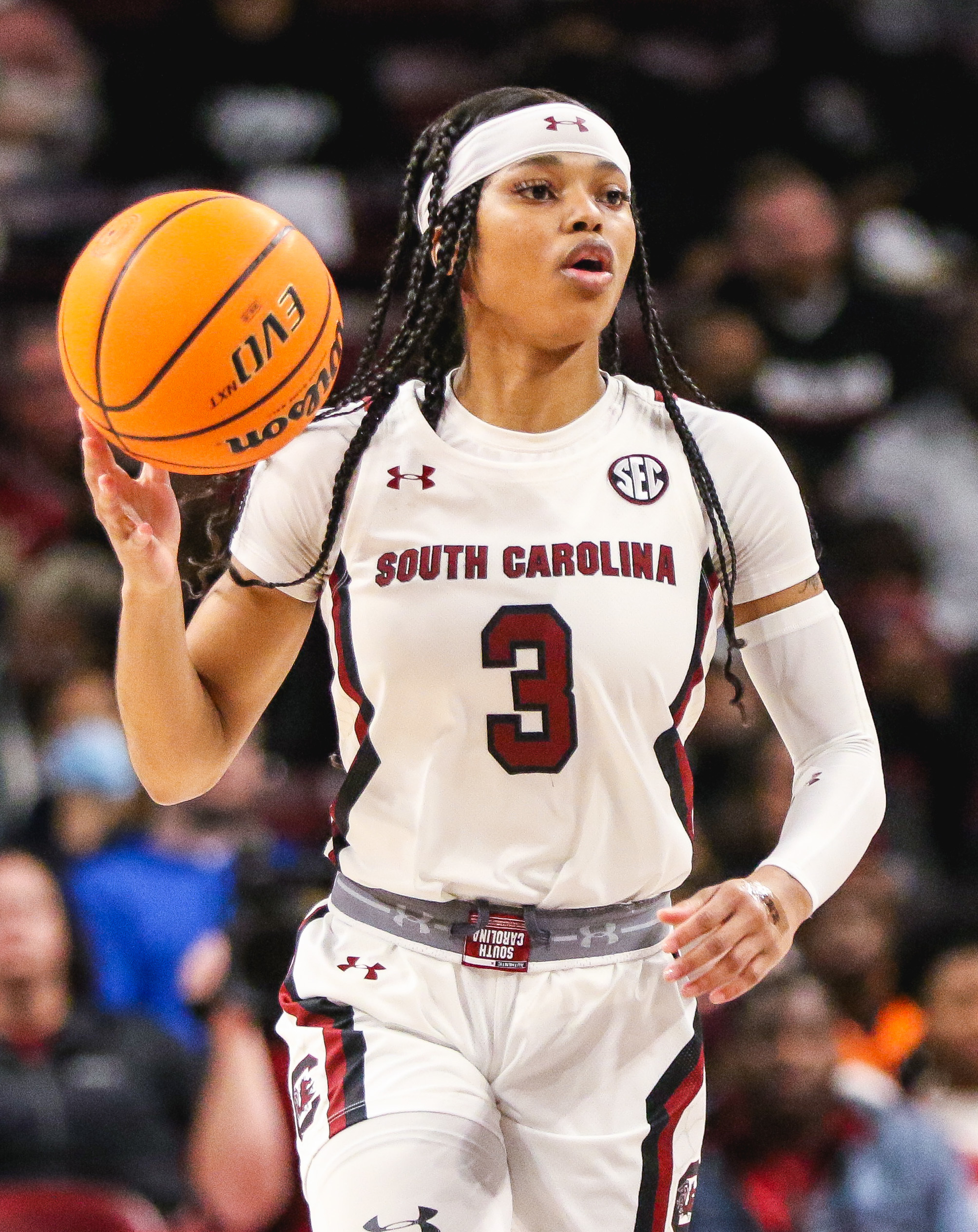
- Henderson with South Carolina in 2021

No. 33 – Crvena zvezda
- Position: Point guard
- League: Basketball League of Serbia; EuroLeague Women

Personal information
- Born: February 2, 1999 (age 27) Fort Myers, Florida, U.S.
- Listed height: 5 ft 7 in (1.70 m)
- Listed weight: 140 lb (64 kg)

Career information
- High school: Fort Myers (Fort Myers, Florida)
- College: South Carolina (2018–2022)
- WNBA draft: 2022: 2nd round, 20th overall pick
- Drafted by: Indiana Fever
- Playing career: 2022–present

Career history
- 2022: Indiana Fever
- 2023: Los Angeles Sparks
- 2023: Phoenix Mercury
- 2023–2024: Antalya BSB Toroslar BC
- 2024: Atlanta Dream
- 2024–2025: Danilo's Pizza
- 2025–2026: Nika Syktyvkar
- 2026–present: Crvena zvezda

Career highlights
- NCAA champion (2022); Third-team All-American – USBWA (2022); First-team All-SEC (2022); SEC All-Freshman Team (2019); McDonald's All-American (2018); Florida Miss Basketball (2018)
- Stats at Basketball Reference
Medals
Women's basketball
Representing the United States
FIBA AmeriCup
Gold medal – first place	2021 Puerto Rico	Team
FIBA Under-17 World Cup
Bronze medal – third place	2016 Spain	Team

Destanni Mone Henderson (born February 2, 1999) is an American professional basketball player for Crvena zvezda of the Basketball League of Serbia. She previously played for the Indiana Fever, Los Angeles Sparks, Phoenix Mercury, and Atlanta Dream in the Women's National Basketball Association (WNBA). Henderson played college basketball for the South Carolina Gamecocks, helping her team win the national championship and earning first-team All-Southeastern Conference honors as a senior. At Fort Myers Senior High School, she won three straight state titles, was a McDonald's All-American selection and was rated as the number one point guard in her class by ESPN. Henderson competes for the United States national team and won a gold medal at the 2021 FIBA AmeriCup.

== Early life ==
Henderson was born on February 2, 1999, in Fort Myers, Florida, to Joyel James and Derrick Henderson. She first picked up a basketball at age four, but did not play seriously until the age of 11. Henderson grew up playing against boys and male relatives, and later through the YMCA. She competed for Florida Future, a Fort Myers-based Amateur Athletic Union program, from fifth grade. Henderson played for Fort Myers Senior High School in Fort Myers. In her freshman season, she was named to the Class 7A All-State Second Team. As a sophomore, Henderson averaged 15.3 points, 4.3 assists, 3.5 rebounds and three steals per game, and led her team to its first Class 6A state championship. She earned Class 6A All-State First Team honors and was selected as The News-Press All-Area Player of the Year.

In her junior season, Henderson averaged 17.7 points, 4.3 assists and four rebounds per game, and helped Fort Myers win the Class 7A state title. She repeated as The News-Press All-Area Player of the Year and was named Class 7A Player of the Year. As a senior, Henderson won the Class 7A state tournament to capture a third consecutive state championship. She finished the season averaging 15.2 points, 6.1 assists, 5.3 rebounds and 3.3 steals per game. Henderson was selected to play in the McDonald's All-American Game and Jordan Brand Classic. She was named Florida Miss Basketball, Florida Gatorade Player of the Year and Class 7A Player of the Year. The News-Press recognized her as its Female Athlete of the Year and Basketball Player of the Year. In 2020, she was awarded The News-Press Player of the Decade by the newspaper's writers and editors.

Henderson was considered a five-star recruit and the number one point guard in the 2018 class by ESPN. On January 15, 2017, she committed to playing college basketball for South Carolina over scholarship offers from Notre Dame, Tennessee, Ohio State, NC State and Florida State. Henderson had received an offer from South Carolina in eighth grade, and was drawn there by head coach Dawn Staley. She became the program's highest-ranked recruit since A'ja Wilson in 2014.

== College career ==
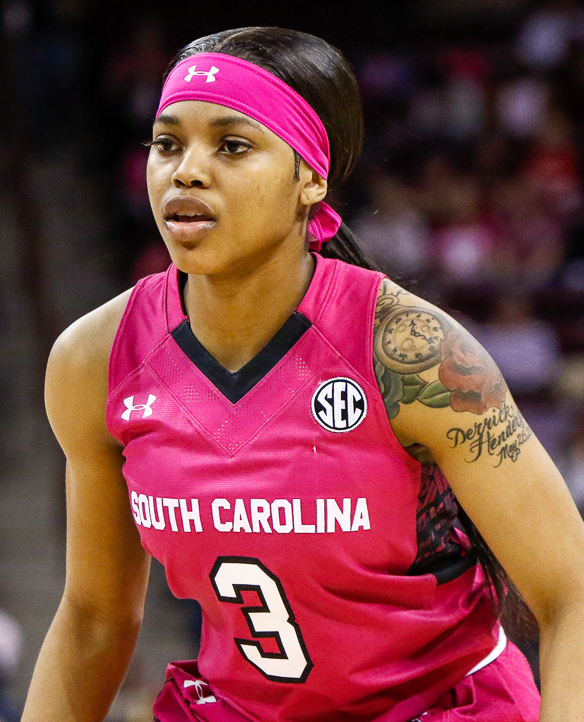
Henderson with South Carolina in 2019

On November 11, 2018, Henderson made her debut for South Carolina, scoring 13 points in a 94–38 win against Alabama State. On February 3, 2019, she recorded a season-high 19 points, four rebounds and two assists in an 87–79 win over Arkansas. As a freshman, Henderson averaged 5.5 points and 1.3 assists per game, and was selected to the Southeastern Conference (SEC) All-Freshman Team. On March 7, 2020, she recorded a sophomore season-high 21 points in a 90–64 victory over Arkansas at the SEC tournament semifinals. Henderson helped her team win the SEC Tournament and earned all-tournament honors. She averaged 8.5 points and 2.8 assists per game as a sophomore.

With the graduation of Tyasha Harris, Henderson became a regular starter for South Carolina during her junior season. On November 29, she scored 23 points, all of which came in the second half, in a 79–72 victory over Gonzaga at the Crossover Classic. She was named most valuable player of the tournament. On January 18, 2021, Henderson registered the first double-double of her career, with 14 points and 10 assists in a 104–82 win against Arkansas. On March 7, she recorded 18 points and nine rebounds in a 67–62 victory over Georgia at the SEC tournament final, and was named to the all-tournament team. Henderson helped her team reach the Final Four of the 2021 NCAA Division I Tournament. As a junior, she averaged 12.2 points, 5.1 assists and 4.7 rebounds per game. On November 29, Henderson suffered a left leg injury against North Carolina A&T. After being sidelined for three weeks, she returned on December 21, and posted 17 points, seven assists and a career-high seven steals in a 65–61 win over second-ranked Stanford. She led South Carolina back from an 18-point deficit, making it the largest comeback in program history. In her regular season finale on February 27, 2022, Henderson scored 23 points in a 71–57 win against Ole Miss. Henderson helped South Carolina win the national championship. In the title game, she recorded a career-high 26 points, four assists and three steals in a 64–49 win over UConn. Henderson was the primary defender on Paige Bueckers, who was held to 14 points. She was named to the Final Four all-tournament team. As a senior, Henderson averaged 11.5 points, 3.9 assists and 3.1 rebounds per game. She made the First Team All-SEC and received Third Team All-American honors from the United States Basketball Writers Association.

== Professional career ==
=== WNBA ===
==== Indiana Fever (2022–2023) ====
On April 11, 2022, Henderson was drafted in the second round, 20th overall, by the Indiana Fever in the 2022 WNBA draft.

On May 16, 2023, Henderson was waived.

==== Los Angeles Sparks (2023) ====
On June 16, 2023, Henderson signed a Hardship Contract with the Los Angeles Sparks. Henderson played for the Sparks until the All-Star break, when she was released from her hardship contract on July 16, 2023. Henderson's hardship contract came to end when the Sparks activated the injured Layshia Clarendon.

==== Phoenix Mercury (2023) ====
Henderson signed a 7-Day Contract with the Phoenix Mercury on August 7, 2023. She signed a 2nd 7-Day Contract to remain with the Mercury on August 14, 2023. Following the conclusion of her 2nd 7-Day Contract, Henderson was not signed back to the Mercury.

==== Atlanta Dream (2024) ====
On April 28, 2024, Henderson signed a training camp contract with the Atlanta Dream. She played in two preseason games, but did not make the final roster and was waived on May 10, 2024. On July 5, 2024, she signed a 7-day hardship contract with the Dream. She signed one more 7-day hardship contract a week later, but was ultimately waived upon its expiration.

=== Overseas ===
==== Antalya BSB Toroslar BC (2023–2024) ====
In June 2023, Henderson signed with Turkish Women's Basketball Super League (KBSL) and EuroCup team Antalya BSB Toroslar BC.

==== Danilo's Pizza (2024–2025) ====
Henderson signed with Danilo's Pizza of the Turkish Super League for the 2024–2025 season.

== National team career ==
Henderson was named to the United States team for the 2016 FIBA Under-17 World Championship for Women in Spain. On June 27, 2016, she recorded 15 points, seven rebounds and seven assists in a 79–62 win against Brazil at the Round of 16. In seven games, Henderson averaged 7.1 points, five assists and 4.4 rebounds per game, helping her team win the bronze medal. She joined the senior national team at the 2021 FIBA AmeriCup in Puerto Rico. Henderson averaged 5.5 points and 3.7 assists per game, and won a gold medal.

== Career statistics ==
Legend
GP	Games played	GS	Games started	MPG	Minutes per game	RPG	Rebounds per game
APG	Assists per game	SPG	Steals per game	BPG	Blocks per game	PPG	Points per game
TO	Turnovers per game	FG%	Field-goal percentage	3P%	3-point field-goal percentage	FT%	Free-throw percentage
**Bold**	Career best	°	League leader

*	Denotes season(s) in which Henderson won an NCAA Championship

=== EuroCup ===
EuroCup statistics
Year	Team	GP	MPG	PPG	PTS	RPG	APG	FGM-FGA	FG%	3PM-3PA	3P%	FTM-FTA	FT%
2023–24	Antalya BSB Toroslar BC	4	34.7	20.5	82	5	4.8	7.5-16.8	44.8	0.8-6	29.2	3.8-4.8	78.9

=== WNBA ===
==== Regular season ====
Stats current through end of 2024 season

WNBA regular season statistics
Year	Team	GP	GS	MPG	FG%	3P%	FT%	RPG	APG	SPG	BPG	TO	PPG
2022	Indiana	**36**	5	16.4	**.401**	**.366**	.719	1.6	**2.5**	**0.8**	0.1	1.7	**5.3**
2023	Los Angeles	10	1	16.9	.362	.105	.737	0.8	**2.5**	0.7	0.1	1.3	5.0
2023	Phoenix	5	0	6.2	.200	.200	**1.000**	0.8	0.4	0.0	0.0	**0.2**	1.4
2024	Atlanta	6	0	**17.5**	.345	.100	.429	**2.0**	**2.5**	0.3	**0.2**	1.7	4.0
**Career**	3 years, 4 teams	57	6	15.7	.380	.286	.700	1.4	2.3	0.6	0.1	1.5	4.8

=== College ===
NCAA statistics
Year	Team	GP	GS	MPG	FG%	3P%	FT%	RPG	APG	SPG	BPG	TO	PPG
2018–19	South Carolina	31	9	15.7	.369	.372	.706	1.6	1.3	0.5	0.1	**1.3**	5.5
2019–20	South Carolina	33	0	23.5	.416	.323	.651	2.9	2.8	1.2	0.1	1.9	8.5
2020–21	South Carolina	31	31	**34.0**	**.430**	**.414**	**.764**	**4.7**	**5.1**	1.3	**0.2**	2.8	**12.2**
2021–22*	South Carolina	**34**	**34**	31.0	.403	.399	.721	3.1	3.9	**1.4**	00.1	2.1	11.5
**Career**		129	74	26.1	40.9	37.9	71.3	3.1	3.3	1.1	0.1	2.0	9.5

== Personal life ==
Henderson's nickname, "Boss," was passed down from her mother, whose grandfather called her "Boss Hog," in reference to the character from The Dukes of Hazzard. Her coach with the Florida Future, Jamie Outten, nicknamed her "Lil Boss" when she joined the team as a fifth-grader, and the nickname was changed to "Boss" as she grew older.

Henderson majored in criminology and criminal justice at the University of South Carolina. She made the SEC Academic Honor Roll for five semesters during her first three years at South Carolina.
