= Jasmine Walker =

American basketball player (born 1998)

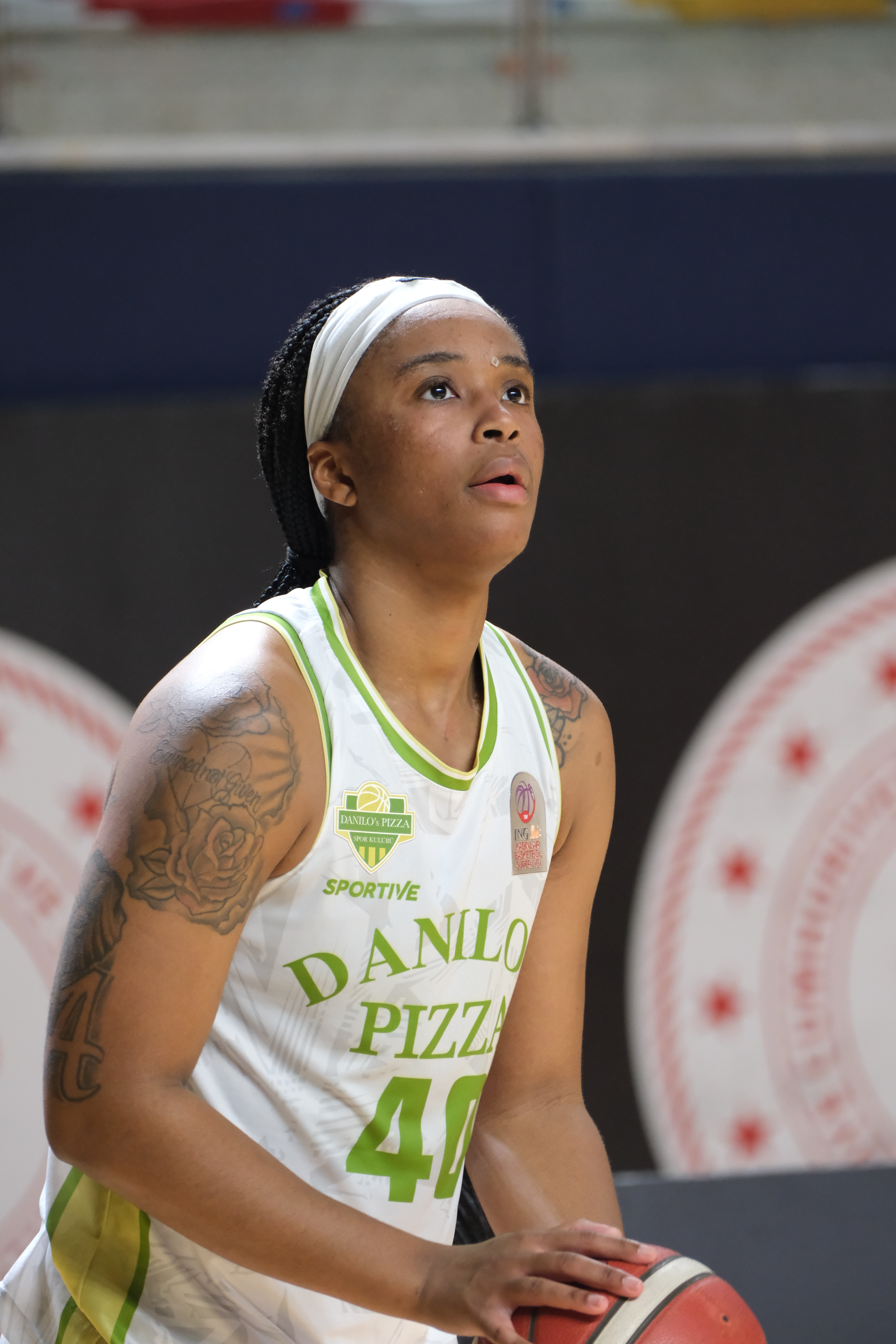

No. 40 – Jacksonville Waves
- Position: Power forward
- League: UpShot League

Personal information
- Born: February 2, 1998 (age 28) Montgomery, Alabama, U.S.
- Listed height: 6 ft 3 in (1.91 m)

Career information
- High school: Jefferson Davis (Montgomery, Alabama)
- College: Florida State (2016); Alabama (2016–2021)
- WNBA draft: 2021: 1st round, 7th overall pick
- Drafted by: Los Angeles Sparks
- Playing career: 2021–present

Career history
- 2021–2022: Los Angeles Sparks
- 2023–2024: Panathlitikos Sykeon
- 2026–present: Jacksonville Waves

Career highlights
- First-team All-SEC (2021); Alabama Miss Basketball (2016)
- Stats at Basketball Reference

Jasmine Walker (born February 3, 1998) is an American professional basketball player who plays for the Jacksonville Waves of the UpShot League, an American women's developmental league. She previously played for the College side Alabama Crimson Tide women's basketball.

== High school career ==
Walker attended Jefferson Davis High School where in her senior year in 2015–16, she averaged 19.3 ppg. and 7.9 rpg. to help her school to a 25–6 record and the 7A state title. She scored 18 points in the state championship win against McGill-Toolen High School. She was named the 2016 Gatorade State Player of the Year, the 2016 USA Today Alabama Player of the Year and was also part of the 2016 All-Alabama first team.

== College career ==
Walker started her college career at the Florida State Seminoles women's basketball team in 2016, where she played just five games and had a season high of 14 points in a game against Winthrop Eagles women's basketball team. She moved to Alabama Crimson Tide women's basketball team. In her Senior Season, she averaged 19.1 points and 9.4 rebounds in 27 games in her senior season. She shot 39.8% from the 3-point line.

=== Florida State and Alabama statistics ===
Ratios
Year	Team	GP	FG%	3P%	FT%	RBG	APG	BPG	SPG	PPG
2016-17	Florida State	5	47.8%	25.0%	-	1.40	0.40	-	0.20	4.60
2017-18	Alabama	24	37.9%	26.4%	85.2%	4.21	0.58	0.04	0.63	5.71
2018-19	Alabama	31	41.3%	35.5%	69.4%	7.55	1.07	0.13	0.97	12.42
2019-20	Alabama	30	39.6%	37.9%	72.0%	7.13	1.13	0.60	0.97	11.93
2020-21	Alabama	27	43.7%	39.8%	83.5%	9.44	1.48	0.85	0.67	19.11
Career		117	41.4%	36.8%	76.1%	6.93	1.05	0.39	0.79	12.13

Totals
Year	Team	GP	FG	FGA	3P	3PA	FT	FTA	REB	A	BK	ST	PTS
2016-17	Florida State	5	11	23	1	4	0	2	7	2	0	1	23
2017-18	Alabama	24	50	132	14	53	23	27	101	14	1	15	137
2018-19	Alabama	31	143	346	49	138	50	72	234	33	4	30	385
2019-20	Alabama	30	129	326	64	169	36	50	214	34	18	29	358
2020-21	Alabama	27	186	426	78	196	66	79	255	40	23	18	516
Career		117	519	1253	206	560	175	230	811	123	46	93	1419

== Professional career ==
=== WNBA ===
On April 15, 2021, the Los Angeles Sparks selected Walker as the 7th pick in the 2021 WNBA draft.

Walker was traded to the Connecticut Sun in January 2023. On February 16, she was released by the Sun.

On February 24, Walker signed a training camp contract with the Seattle Storm. She was waived on May 17.

== Overseas ==
Walker continued her professional career overseas, including a stint in Turkey, where she played for Danilo's Pizza SK. She also competed in other international leagues as she pursued expanded playing opportunities following her WNBA career.

== UpShot League ==
In April 2026, the UpShot League, an American professional women's basketball league, announced that Walker would play for them. On April 26, it was announced via Instagram that Walker was a member of the Jacksonville Waves.

== WNBA Career Stats ==
Legend
GP	Games played	GS	Games started	MPG	Minutes per game	RPG	Rebounds per game
APG	Assists per game	SPG	Steals per game	BPG	Blocks per game	PPG	Points per game
TO	Turnovers per game	FG%	Field-goal percentage	3P%	3-point field-goal percentage	FT%	Free-throw percentage
**Bold**	Career best	°	League leader

=== Regular season ===
Year	Team	GP	GS	MPG	FG%	3P%	FT%	RPG	APG	SPG	BPG	TO	PPG
2021	Los Angeles	2	0	**10.0**	.000	.000	.000	0.5	**1.0**	**1.0**	**0.5**	0.5	0.0
2022	Los Angeles	**32**	**1**	8.8	**.250**	**.200**	**1.000**	**1.5**	0.2	0.2	0.1	0.5	**1.6**
Career	2 years, 1 team	34	0	108.90	.235	.185	.600	1.4	0.2	0.2	0.1	0.5	1.5
