= Danilo's Pizza SK =

Danilo's Pizza Spor Kulübü
- Leagues: Turkish Super League
- Founded: 2024; 1 year ago
- Arena: Şehit Polis Recep Topaloğlu
- Location: İzmit, Turkey
- President: (Turkey) Zafer Bahadır Saraç
- Head coach: (Turkey) Fırat Okul

Danilo's Pizza Spor Kulübü is a Turkish women's basketball club based in İzmit, Turkey. The club was founded in 2024 and currently competing in the Women's Basketball Super League.
